= List of The Goodies episodes =

TV episodes

The Goodies is a British television comedy series shown in the 1970s and early 1980s, starring Tim Brooke-Taylor, Graeme Garden and Bill Oddie. The series, which combines surreal sketches and situation comedy, was broadcast by the BBC, initially on BBC2 but soon repeated on BBC1, from 1970 until 1980. The final seven-episode series was made by LWT and shown on ITV in 1981–1982.

During the course of the programme, 76 episodes of The Goodies aired, including two specials over nine series.

Since the deaths of Tim Brooke-Taylor on 12 April 2020 and Bill Oddie on 25 July 2026, Graeme Garden is the only surviving member of the trio.

== Series overview ==
Series	Episodes	Originally released			Average viewers (millions)
Series	Episodes	First released	Last released	Network	Average viewers (millions)
1	7	8 November 1970	20 December 1970	BBC2	1.6
2	13	1 October 1971	14 January 1972	BBC2	2.3
Specials	2	9 April 1972	24 September 1972	BBC2	3.6
3	7	4 February 1973	12 July 1973	BBC2	2.7
4	7	1 December 1973	12 January 1974	BBC2	2.5
5	14	10 February 1975	21 December 1975	BBC2	8.8
6	7	21 September 1976	2 November 1976	BBC2	7.9
7	6	1 November 1977	22 December 1977	BBC2	6.2
8	6	14 January 1980	18 February 1980	BBC2	TBA
9	7	27 December 1981	13 February 1982	ITV	TBA

== Episodes ==
=== Series 1 (1970) ===
No. overall	No. in series	Title	Original release date
1	1	"Tower of London" "Beefeaters"	8 November 1970
2	2	"Snooze"	15 November 1970
3	3	"Give Police a Chance" "Love the Police" / "Police Public Image" / "Police Brutality"	22 November 1970
4	4	"Caught in the Act" "The Playgirl Club" / "Compromising Photos"	29 November 1970
5	5	"The Greenies" "Army Games"	6 December 1970
6	6	"Cecily" "Servants" / "Haunted House"	13 December 1970
7	7	"Radio Goodies" "Pirate Radio Station" / "Pirate Radio Goodies"	20 December 1970

=== Series 2 (1971–72) ===
No. overall	No. in series	Title	Original release date
8	1	"Scotland" "The Loch Ness Monster"	1 October 1971
9	2	"Commonwealth Games" "Sporting Goodies" / "Goodies of Sport"	8 October 1971
10	3	"Pollution" "The Ministry of Pollution"	15 October 1971
11	4	"The Lost Tribe" "The Lost Tribe of the Orinoco" / "Safari with Hazel Nuts"	22 October 1971
12	5	"The Music Lovers" "The Music Master" / "The Stolen Musicians"	29 October 1971
13	6	"Culture for the Masses" "Art for Art's Sake" / "For Art's Sake" / "Antiques" / "Art Restoration"	5 November 1971
14	7	"Kitten Kong"	12 November 1971
15	8	"Come Dancing" "Wicked Waltzing" / "Dancing"	19 November 1971
16	9	"Farm Fresh Food" "Health Farm" / "Uncle Tom's Farm"	10 December 1971
17	10	"Women's Lib" "Sexual Liberation" / "Free to Live"	17 December 1971
18	11	"Gender Education" "Sex and Violence"	31 December 1971
19	12	"Charity Bounce" "London to Brighton"	7 January 1972
20	13	"The Baddies" "The Nicest Person in the World" / "Double Trouble" / "Bad Copies"	14 January 1972

=== Specials (1972) ===
No. overall	No. special	Title	Original release date
21	1	"Kitten Kong: Montreux '72 Edition"	9 April 1972
22	2	"'A Collection of Goodies' – Special Tax Edition"	24 September 1972

=== Series 3 (1973) ===
No. overall	No. in series	Title	Original release date
23	1	"The New Office" "Monster Machines" / "Moving Day"	4 February 1973
24	2	"Hunting Pink" "Where There's a Will..." / "A Hunting We Will Go" / "Tally-Ho"	11 February 1973
25	3	"Winter Olympics"	18 February 1973
26	4	"That Old Black Magic" "Black Magic" / "Which Witch is Which?"	25 February 1973
27	5	"For Those in Peril on the Sea" "The Lost Island of Munga" / "A High-Sea Adventure"	4 March 1973
28	6	"Way Outward Bound" "Outward Bounds" / "Baby Army"	11 March 1973
29	7	"Superstar" "Rock Star"	12 July 1973

=== Series 4 (1973–74) ===
No. overall	No. in series	Title	Original release date
30	1	"Camelot"	1 December 1973
31	2	"Invasion of the Moon Creatures" "Big Bunny" / "On the Moon with Big Bunny"	8 December 1973
32	3	"Hospital for Hire" "The National Health Service" / "Doctors"	15 December 1973
33	4	"The Goodies and the Beanstalk"	24 December 1973
34	5	"The Stone Age" "Archaeologists" / "Tyrannosaurus Rex" / "Pot-Holing" / "Let's go Pot-Holing" / "Dinosaur"	29 December 1973
35	6	"Goodies in the Nick" "The Great Goodies Bank Robbery" / "Bank Robbery"	5 January 1974
36	7	"The Race"	12 January 1974

=== Series 5 (1975) ===
No. overall	No. in series	Title	Original release date
37	1	"The Movies" "The British Film Industry" / "The Black & White, Western, Epic Movie" / "BBC" / "The Choices of Film Creation"	10 February 1975
38	2	"Clown Virus"	17 February 1975
39	3	"Chubbie Chumps" "Radio 2" / "The Beauty Contest" / "Housewives" / "Radio Contest" / "Miss Housewife"	24 February 1975
40	4	"Wacky Wales" "Welsh Rugby"	3 March 1975
41	5	"Frankenfido"	10 March 1975
42	6	"Scatty Safari" "The Existence of Rolf Harris" / "Pied Piper Goodies versus the Rolf Harris Plague"	17 March 1975
43	7	"Kung Fu Kapers" "Ecky-Thump"	24 March 1975
44	8	"Lighthouse Keeping Loonies" "The Lighthouse Men" / "A Little Light Housekeeping" / "Lighthouse Loonies"	31 March 1975
45	9	"Rome Antics"	7 April 1975
46	10	"Fleet Street Goodies" "Cunning Stunts" / "The 'Goodies Clarion' Newspaper"	14 April 1975
47	11	"South Africa" "Apartheight" / "A South African Adventure"	21 April 1975
48	12	"Bunfight at the O.K. Tea Rooms" "Cream Cave" / "Cream Rush Fever"	28 April 1975
49	13	"The End" "Encased in Concrete" / "Concrete on the Outside" / "Entombed"	5 May 1975
50	14	"The Goodies Rule – O.K.?"	21 December 1975

=== Series 6 (1976) ===
No. overall	No. in series	Title	Original release date
51	1	"Lips, or Almighty Cod" "Cod"	21 September 1976
52	2	"Hype Pressure" "The Rock and Roll Revival"	28 September 1976
53	3	"Daylight Robbery on the Orient Express"	5 October 1976
54	4	"Black and White Beauty"	12 October 1976
55	5	"It Might as Well Be String"	19 October 1976
56	6	"2001 & A Bit" "The Future of the Goodies"	26 October 1976
57	7	"The Goodies – Almost Live" "The Goodies in Concert"	2 November 1976

=== Series 7 (1977) ===
No. overall	No. in series	Title	Original release date
58	1	"Alternative Roots" "The Goodies Find Their Roots" / "Hoots, Toots and Froots"	1 November 1977
59	2	"Dodonuts"	8 November 1977
60	3	"Scoutrageous" "Scouting Adventures" / "Boy Scouts"	22 November 1977
61	4	"Punky Business" "Punkerella" / "Rock Goodies"	29 November 1977
62	5	"Royal Command" "Royal Command Performance"	6 December 1977
63	6	"Earthanasia" "The End of the World Show" / "The End of the World"	22 December 1977

=== Series 8 (1980) ===
No. overall	No. in series	Title	Original release date
64	1	"Goodies and Politics" "Politics" / "Timita"	14 January 1980
65	2	"Saturday Night Grease" "Discotheque"	21 January 1980
66	3	"A Kick in the Arts" "Summer Olympics"	28 January 1980
67	4	"U-Friend or UFO?" "Close Encounters"	4 February 1980
68	5	"Animals" "Animal Liberation" / "Animal Lib" / "Watership Down"	11 February 1980
69	6	"War Babies" "World War 2"	18 February 1980

=== Series 9 (1981–82) ===
No. overall	No. in series	Title	Original release date
70	1	"Snow White 2" "Pantomime" / "Snow White and the Seven Dwarfs"	27 December 1981
71	2	"Robot" "Automation"	9 January 1982
72	3	"Football Crazy"	16 January 1982
73	4	"Big Foot" "Bigfoot" / "In Search of Bigfoot" / "Arthur C. Clarke" / "In Search of Arthur C. Clarke"	23 January 1982
74	5	"Change of Life" "Bill's 75th Birthday"	30 January 1982
75	6	"Holiday" "Holidays" / "The Holiday" / "Holiday in Dunsquabbling"	6 February 1982
76	7	"Animals Are People Too" "Pets" / "Tim's Society for the Prevention of Cruelty to People"	13 February 1982

== The Goodies episodes in DVD format ==
=== DVD and pre-recorded VHS releases of episodes ===
==== Series One ====
No.	Prod.	Episode titles	DVD releases	VHS pre-recorded releases	Original TV broadcast dates
101	11/5/0/2521	Tower of London	DVD	VHS	8 November 1970
102	11/5/0/2524	Snooze	DVD	-	15 November 1970
103	11/5/0/2523	Give Police a Chance	DVD	-	22 November 1970
104	11/5/0/2522	Caught in the Act	DVD	-	29 November 1970
105	11/5/0/2526	The Greenies	DVD	-	6 December 1970
106	11/5/0/2525	Cecily	DVD	-	13 December 1970
107	11/5/0/2527	Radio Goodies	DVD	-	20 December 1970

==== Series Two ====
BBC title "The Goodies B"

No.	Prod.	Episode titles	DVD releases	VHS pre-recorded releases	Original TV broadcast dates
201	11/5/1/2151	Scotland	DVD	-	1 October 1971
202	11/5/1/2152	Commonwealth Games	DVD	-	8 October 1971
203	11/5/1/2154	Pollution	DVD	-	15 October 1971
204	11/5/1/2153	The Lost Tribe	DVD	-	22 October 1971
205	11/5/1/2155	The Music Lovers	DVD	-	29 October 1971
206	11/5/1/2156	Culture for the Masses	DVD	-	5 November 1971
207	11/5/1/2157	Kitten Kong	-	-	12 November 1971
208	11/5/1/2158	Come Dancing	DVD	-	19 November 1971
209	11/5/1/2159	Farm Fresh Food	DVD	-	10 December 1971
210	11/5/1/2160	Women's Lib	DVD	-	17 December 1971
211	11/5/1/2161	Gender Education	DVD	VHS	31 December 1971
212	11/5/1/2162	Charity Bounce	DVD	-	7 January 1972
213	11/5/1/2163	The Baddies	DVD	-	14 January 1972
214	Special	Kitten Kong ('72 Montreux)	DVD	VHS	9 April 1972
215	Special	A Collection of Goodies (Special Tax Edition)	DVD	-	24 September 1972

==== Series Three ====
BBC title "The Goodies Series Three A"

No.	Prod.	Episode titles	DVD releases	VHS pre-recorded releases	Original TV broadcast dates
301	11/5/2/2271	The New Office	DVD	-	3 February 1973
302	11/5/2/2272	Hunting Pink	DVD	-	10 February 1973
303	11/5/2/2273	Winter Olympics	DVD	-	17 February 1973
304	11/5/2/2274	That Old Black Magic	DVD	-	24 February 1973
305	11/5/2/2275	For Those in Peril on the Sea	DVD	-	3 March 1973
306	11/5/2/2276	Way Outward Bound	DVD	-	10 March 1973
307	11/5/2/2277	Superstar	DVD	-	12 July 1973

==== Series Four ====
BBC title "The Goodies Series Three B"

No.	Prod.	Episode titles	DVD releases	VHS pre-recorded releases	Original TV broadcast dates
401	11/5/2/2280	Camelot	DVD	-	1 December 1973
402	11/5/2/2281	Invasion of the Moon Creatures	DVD	-	8 December 1973
403	11/5/2/2278	Hospital for Hire	DVD	-	15 December 1973
404	Special	The Goodies and the Beanstalk	DVD	VHS	22 December 1973
405	11/5/2/2283	The Stone Age	DVD	-	29 December 1973
406	11/5/2/2282	Goodies in the Nick	DVD	-	5 January 1974
407	11/5/2/2279	The Race	DVD	-	12 January 1974

==== Series Five ====
BBC title "The Goodies 1974 / The Goodies Autumn 1974 (last six episodes)"

No.	Prod.	Episode titles	DVD releases	VHS pre-recorded releases	Original TV broadcast dates
501	11/5/4/2042	The Movies	DVD	-	10 February 1975
502	11/5/4/2041	Clown Virus	DVD	-	17 February 1975
503	11/5/4/2044	Chubbie Chumps	DVD	-	24 February 1975
504	11/5/4/2045	Wacky Wales	DVD	-	3 March 1975
505	11/5/4/2046	Frankenfido	DVD	-	10 March 1975
506	11/5/4/2049	Scatty Safari	DVD	VHS	17 March 1975
507	11/5/4/2048	Kung Fu Kapers	DVD	VHS	24 March 1975
508	11/5/4/2047	Lighthouse Keeping Loonies	DVD	VHS	31 March 1975
509	11/5/4/2050	Rome Antics	DVD	-	7 April 1975
510	11/5/4/2051	Fleet Street Goodies	DVD	-	14 April 1975
511	11/5/4/2043	South Africa	DVD	-	21 April 1975
512	11/5/4/2052	Bunfight at the O.K. Tea Rooms	DVD	VHS	28 April 1975
513	11/5/4/2053	The End	DVD	VHS	5 May 1975
514	Special	Goodies Rule – O.K.?	DVD	-	21 December 1975

==== Series Six ====
BBC title "The Goodies: Series Five / Series V"

No.	Prod.	Episode titles	DVD releases	VHS pre-recorded releases	Original TV broadcast dates
601	11/5/6/2001	Lips, or Almighty Cod	DVD	-	21 September 1976
602	11/5/6/2002	Hype Pressure	DVD	-	28 September 1976
603	11/5/6/2005	Daylight Robbery on the Orient Express	DVD	-	5 October 1976
604	11/5/6/2006	Black and White Beauty	DVD	-	12 October 1976
605	11/5/6/2003	It Might as Well Be String	DVD	-	19 October 1976
606	11/5/6/2004	2001 & A Bit	DVD	-	26 October 1976
607	11/5/6/2007	The Goodies Almost Live	DVD	-	2 November 1976

==== Series Seven ====
BBC title "The Goodies: Autumn 1977"

No.	Prod.	Episode titles	DVD releases	VHS pre-recorded releases	Original TV broadcast dates
701	01157/2001	Alternative Roots	DVD	-	1 November 1977
702	01157/2002	Dodonuts	DVD	-	8 November 1977
703	01157/2004	Scoutrageous	DVD	VHS	22 November 1977
704	01157/2005	Punky Business	DVD	-	29 November 1977
705	01157/2003	Royal Command	DVD	-	6 December 1977
706	01157/2006	Earthanasia	DVD	VHS	22 December 1977

==== Series Eight ====
No.	Prod.	Episode titles	DVD releases	VHS pre-recorded releases	Original TV broadcast dates
801	1158/9671	Goodies and Politics	DVD	-	14 January 1980
802	1158/9672	Saturday Night Grease	DVD	VHS	21 January 1980
803	1158/9673	A Kick in the Arts	DVD	-	28 January 1980
804	1158/9674	U-Friend or UFO?	DVD	-	4 February 1980
805	1158/9675	Animals	DVD	-	11 February 1980
806	1158/9676	War Babies	DVD	-	18 February 1980

==== Series Nine ====
No.	Prod.	Episode titles	DVD releases	VHS pre-recorded releases	Original TV broadcast dates
901	90329	Snow White 2	DVD	-	27 December 1981
902	90327	Robot	DVD	VHS	9 January 1982
903	90325	Football Crazy	DVD	VHS	16 January 1982
904	90328	Big Foot	DVD	VHS	23 January 1982
905	90326	Change of Life	DVD	VHS	30 January 1982
906	90330	Holiday	DVD	-	6 February 1982
907	90331	Animals Are People Too	DVD	-	13 February 1982

== Video and DVD releases ==
=== 1980s ===
"The Goodies (1982)" — Thorn EMI Video

Football Crazy
Robot
Big Foot
Change of Life

"The Goodies and the Beanstalk (1983)" — BBC Enterprises Limited

The Goodies and the Beanstalk

"The Goodies (1986)" — Thorn EMI Video

Football Crazy
Change of Life

=== 1990s ===
"Look out! It's ... The Goodies: Kitten Kong (1994)" — BBC Enterprises Limited

Kitten Kong (72' Montreux)
Scatty Safari
Scoutrageous

"Look out! It's ... The Goodies: The Goodies and the Beanstalk (1994)" — BBC Enterprises Limited

The Goodies and the Beanstalk
The End
Bunfight at the O.K. Tea Rooms

=== 2000s ===
"The Goodies ...At Last (2003)" — Network DVD

Tower of London
Gender Education
Kitten Kong (72' Montreux)
The Goodies and the Beanstalk
Kung Fu Kapers
Lighthouse Keeping Loonies
Earthanasia
Saturday Night Grease

"The Goodies ...At Last a Second Helping (2005)" — Network DVD

Radio Goodies
Come Dancing
The Movies
South Africa
Bunfight at the O.K. Tea Rooms
The End
Scoutrageous
Punky Business

"The Goodies: The Complete LWT Series (2007)" — Network DVD

Snow White 2
Robot
Football Crazy
Big Foot
Change of Life
Holiday
Animals

=== 2010s ===
"The Goodies ...At Last - Back for More, Again (2010)" — Network DVD

Cecily
The Music Lovers
The New Office
The Goodies Rule - O.K.?
Camelot
It Might as Well Be String
2001 & A Bit
Royal Command

"The Goodies: The Complete BBC Collection (2018)" — Network DVD

Contains all 69 episodes of the BBC series.

"The Goodies: The Complete Collection (2019)" — Network DVD

Contains all 76 episodes of the series, plus extras from The Complete BBC Collection and The Complete LWT Series.

== See also ==
- The Goodies discography
- The Goodies videography — the Goodies on DVD and VHS

== Sources ==
- The Complete Goodies — Robert Ross, B T Batsford, London, 2000
- The Goodies Rule OK — Robert Ross, Carlton Books Ltd, Sydney, 2006
- From Fringe to Flying Circus — Celebrating a Unique Generation of Comedy 1960–1980 — Roger Wilmut, Eyre Methuen Ltd, 1980
- The Goodies Episode Summaries — Brett Allender
- The Goodies — Fact File — Matthew K. Sharp
