= Hype Pressure =

- The Goodies episode
- Episode no.: Series 6 Episode 2
- Original air date: 28 September 1976

Guest appearances
- McDonald Hobley; Mary Malcolm; Corbet Woodall as himself (the Newsreader); Jake Anthony; Richard Pescud

Episode chronology
← Previous "Lips, or Almighty Cod"	Next → "Daylight Robbery on the Orient Express"

"Hype Pressure" is an episode of the award-winning British comedy television series The Goodies. The episode is also known as "The Rock and Roll Revival". It was written by The Goodies, with songs and music by Bill Oddie.

== Plot ==
Tim is the presenter and producer of "New Faeces", a TV talent show. Having run out of awful acts to humiliate, he overhears Bill and Graeme in the Goodies' office trying to write a new single and ending up trying to perform like folk singers. He invites the pair onto the show, but their dreadful performance actually goes down well with the audience and the judges (including the hard to please Tony Bitch), leaving a furious Tim out of a job and his show cancelled.

However, Tim then hits on the idea of the 1950s/rock and roll revival. When Bill points out that that's already been done, he brings back the rock and roll revival and the country is plunged into a ridiculous obsession with everything 1950s, to the point that even the TV has turned into a 1950s version of it. Worse yet, Tim has turned into a sock-selling conman and a TV director, and the boys have been called for two years in the army as National Service has been reinstated.

The next day, Tim fools Graeme and Bill into thinking that his revivalist stuff has gone stale and invites them to appear on another of his hideous shows, Superficial with Tim as a flamboyant, white-haired director who begins cue-ing every sort of thing while Bill and Graeme perform as a hippie duo, including the return of World War II.

After Tim, Graeme and Bill "cues" in various foes, Kitten Kong and the Giant Dougal make brief cameo appearances, as do the special effects team working the strings, Bill and Graeme cue a "Party Political Broadcast" starring Margaret Thatcher, which beats Tim into submission.

== Cultural references ==
1950s nostalgia was an important trend in 1970s-era UK, featured in films like American Graffiti and That'll Be The Day and the TV series Happy Days. This would go on until the 1980s with Grease, Animal House and the TV programme Hi-De-Hi among others.

- Tony Hatch
- Supersonic
- World War II
- New Faces
- Stars On Sunday
- Six-Five Special
- Oh Boy
- Little Richard
- Simon and Garfunkel

== Notes ==
- During the opening sequence, there is a swipe at Tony Blackburn, a long-running Goodies target of ridicule, in the shape of Graeme's book Play Guitar My Way and Other Jokes by Tony Blackburn.
- During the 1950s revival scenes, Bill's complaint that "they've taken off Porridge and Fawlty Towers" (both popular BBC sitcoms of the day) gets a boo from the studio audience. Similarly, the mention of Muffin the Mule, a well-loved marionette from the early days of the BBC, gets a cheer of recognition.
- Tim's reinvention as a 'black marketeer' is a parody of the George Cole character "Flash Harry" from the long-running St Trinian's series of British comedy films.
- The cowboy footage during the end sequence is gleaned from They Died with Their Boots On.
- After a wait of 33 years, this episode premiered on the Australian Broadcasting Corporation's ABC2 on 13 December 2010, although at a post-watershed time.
