= Change of Life (The Goodies) =

- The Goodies episode
- Episode no.: Series 9 Episode 5
- Original air date: 30 January 1982

Guest appearance
- David Rappaport as the (voice) of the Robot

Episode chronology
← Previous "Big Foot"	Next → "Holiday"

"Change of Life" is an episode of the British comedy television series The Goodies.

This episode is also known as "Bill's 75th Birthday".

This episode was made by LWT for ITV.

Written by Graeme Garden and Bill Oddie, with songs and music by Bill Oddie.

== Plot ==
It is Bill's 40th birthday, and Tim and Graeme intend to celebrate it in grand style. An angry Bill, annoyed that he's getting older, arrives at the office and screams at his fellow Goodies to stop reminding him of his birthday. After Tim and Graeme ignore him and present him with a card and a cake (with no fewer than 75 candles), Bill flies into a rage, and accidentally ends up dumping the cake onto himself. A miserable Bill cheers up a little bit after catching a glimpse of his out-of-shape body in front of the mirror, and Graeme (assuming his doctor alter-ego "Dr Grayboots") offers to give Bill a makeover.

Tim models the wildly over-the-top new looks available for Bill to choose, and after Bill decides on Graeme's Barbara Cartland look-alike option, he's told he will have to settle with what he's given. Graeme then decides that they all could use a makeover and enters their details into the computer, which also organises dates for the trio for the night.

The Goodies hit the town to show off their new looks. Tim is sporting a curly blonde wig, beauty spot and false teeth. Graeme is given curly mop hair, a hairy chest and Groucho Marx-style glasses, nose and moustache. Bill sports a bouffant hairdo, platform shoes and ridiculous false chin. The Goodies wait to meet up with their dates, and soon discover that the computer organised three elderly ladies to be their companions for the night. The Goodies are led on a night of fun by the ladies - firstly to a pub, then a screening of The Texas Chain Saw Massacre, then a disco. The weary Goodies eventually stagger from the disco, only to see the old ladies leave them and head off with a group of motorcyclists.

The trio decide to close down their business due to old age, and Graeme stands on the office balcony threatening to commit suicide. Tim and Bill demand he make a last will and testament before he goes, and with all of his possessions given away, Graeme jumps. Tim is horrified and runs over to the ledge. As he's leaning over the ledge lamenting on "that little face stone dead looking up at me", Graeme emerges, revealing that he only jumped a couple of feet, and right onto Tim's dead tortoise Gilbert.

Stating that it was just a test run, Graeme reveals his elaborate "doomsday machine", a Heath Robinson-style execution machine, replete with a giant blade, a 200,000 volt trap, spears, a shotgun and tripwire, a noose and a 1-ton weight, designed to end it all. Graeme blindfolds himself and prepares to end it all, but as he's about to enter the machine, the telephone rings, but the call is for the Goodies' resident Robot.

The Robot states that the Goodies is under new management and he's taken over. He accepts the job on offer, which makes the Goodies realise that they still want to carry on. The Robot states that they are not what they used to be, and Graeme says they can prove it by undertaking the "Goodies Standard Test", designed to see if they are still capable of carrying on as Goodies. The Robot will take over if they fail, but must do the test as well.

Arriving at the testing centre, the Goodies and the Robot must jump hurdles and then change into their trademark Goodies costumes. Their first task is to make a patriotic speech, Tim does nothing but faint. The Robot fires off fireworks from the top of his head and plays a recording of Land of Hope and Glory, winning the task.

The next task is to make a hit record. The Goodies are fruitless as they try to think of a hit record but the machine tells them "No conferring" and the Robot wins by doing his version of Funky Gibbon. The "Giant Kitten" from the Kitten Kong episode makes an appearance and chases after the Goodies, but as they are chased by the cat, the wires and crew members pulling it along are revealed, with the Goodies computer admonishing the lads for revealing how the special effects were achieved.

The next task is Ecky Thump from the Kung Fu Kapers episode, Tim and Graeme prove no challenge for the Robot. Bill decides to blow up his black pudding to ridiculous size, but it soon explodes all over him, meaning the Goodies lose another task. The Goodies then flee the Golden Goose from The Goodies and the Beanstalk episode. The Goose drops a golden egg bomb, and the computer tells the crew to bring in the Goodies stunt dummies and to get the real Goodies out of the shot. The egg bomb hits the ground and blows the dummies into the air. Trademark jump cuts see the Goodies' dummy selves being replaced by their real selves, but the effect is ruined when Bill appears on the opposite side of the screen to his dummy. The computer orders "get the dummy out" and Bill promptly walks off screen. A crew member brings him back, with the computer saying "No, the other dummy!". The Goose appears again, and it's revealed the phony goose is attached to a crane and being driven along. The Robot blows up the goose, and then the Goodies are attacked by a cardboard cutout Nicholas Parsons. Making their escape on their trademark trandem bike, the Robot blows up Parsons. The Goodies crash their bike into a brick wall and a group of autograph hunters descend upon the Robot.

The final scores are revealed. The Robot scored 53 points. Tim scored 24 points, Graeme scored 28. Bill scored just two, but their combined tally of 54 is enough to beat the Robot. Conceding defeat, the Robot gives the job he received to his rivals. It is then revealed the job is a BBC vacancy looking for "Three Goodies". Suddenly a job taken notice is placed over the job advert and the Goodies notice a trandem bike go past with their replacements - a trio of robots who have become the newest incarnations of the Goodies.

== Cultural references ==
- The "Glasgow Messiah Fu Manchu" look, briefly modelled by Tim, is a reference to Billy Connolly.
- Tim's other impersonations include Denis Healey and Barbara Cartland, as well as a 'cuddly toy' in reference to The Generation Game.
- The grannies drag the Goodies to the cinema to see The Texas Chain Saw Massacre, a film refused a British certificate by the BBFC until 1999, but which was widely released to cinemas anyway after local town and city councils (including the Greater London Council) awarded it an X-certificate (the equivalent to today's 18 certificate).
- The 'Goodies Standard Test' references several other episodes of The Goodies, including Kitten Kong, The Goodies and the Beanstalk, Kung Fu Kapers and The Goodies – Almost Live.
- The final shot was originally intended to have been the Not the Nine O'Clock News team cycling into the BBC headquarters on a four-seater bike.

== DVD and VHS releases ==
This episode has been released on both DVD and VHS.
