= The End (The Goodies) =

- The Goodies episode
- Episode no.: Series 5 Episode 13
- Original air date: 5 May 1975

Guest appearances
- Corbet Woodall as himself (the Newsreader); Sheila Steafel as the Queen (voice)

Episode chronology
← Previous "Bunfight at the O.K. Tea Rooms"	Next → "The Goodies Rule – O.K.?"

"The End" is an episode of the British comedy television series The Goodies.

This episode is also known as "Encased in Concrete" and "Concrete on the Outside" and as "Entombed".

Written by The Goodies, with songs and music by Bill Oddie.

== Plot ==
The Goodies's office accidentally gets completely covered in a solid block of concrete at Kew Gardens, ironically as part of an architectural design of careless loony Graeme who's working for the property magnate Harry Highrise's redevelopment scheme which are nothing but worthless multitude of grey multi-storey skyscrapers and offices with no doors, windows and rooms. The Main Works Department agree to save them, but only after completing a series of highways across Britain (drawn on the map as a game of noughts and crosses). Gradually over a year later the moment of release passes with no rescuers (or royals) in sight, and all the Goodies' utility services are discontinued, including the telephone (they cannot go out to pay the bills). Then, later, the Goodies find out from a BBC News bulletin that when the nation is in the grip of poverty, the government suspended work on the needless Brighton to Birkenhead freeway (and hence the trio's subsequent release) indefinitely, the BBC cuts back their services by 100%, and the ending of television broadcasts means that the Goodies are cut off entirely from the outside world. Tim then asks "Who thinks we should panic now?" All three raise their hands, and proceed to panic, with much screeching and Tim crying "I'm a teapot!" repeatedly, with the attendant teapot pose.

Tempers become short and Bill (arguing with Tim) says: "In this society, every single one of us is gonna clean the shoes." Tim retorts: "You sniviling little commie." Bill retaliates with the comment: "You elitist, fascist pig." Tim, feeling insulted, says: "Well I never." Graeme then enters the conversation, saying: "This is good, political discussion, a healthy thing." Bill denies this, saying: "This isn't political discussion, we're just shouting at one another", to which Graeme replies: "Same thing."

When they are almost out of food, Tim and Graeme decide that Bill should 'provide' for them. Bill, who is totally unaware of the plans against him, comes up with a solution of cooking and eating the furniture. This means that he is not eaten and his life is saved.

The years pass, and the Goodies grow old, and they begin suffering from hallucinations, which is noticeable when Tim and Graeme are in conversation with each other, reliving their past. Tim comments: "Goodness! I've almost forgotten what an umbrella looks like." Graeme then makes the comment: "You know, I've almost forgotten what a woman looks like." Tim reminisces: "Women, yes – and umbrellas. Hey!" Graeme agrees, saying: "Many's the evening you'd dance the night away with an attractive young umbrella." Tim continues: "And, if it rained on your way home, you'd pop up your woman." Graeme then comments: "They'd keep you dry all night!" and Tim says: "I used to have a big black woman with a cane handle ...."

Later they 'get' religion, Graeme becomes a monk, Tim becomes Jewish, and Bill becomes a Black Muslim. While Tim and Graeme show their ages, Bill never seems to change – he seems to be forever young.

A rescue team finally arrives to rescue the Goodies – space suited Goodies from the future, but all that's left in the office is the skeletons of Graeme and Tim and the recently deceased corpse of Bill (who still hasn't aged). Just as they are about to leave, there is a cave-in, trapping the new Goodies where they experience similar difficulties. Immediately, the 'Future Tim' panics and assumes the pose of a teapot spout and handle, and comments: "I'm a teapot!"

== Cultural references ==
- Muhammad Ali
- Star Trek
- Harry Triguboff a real life property developer of Meriton known as "high-rise Harry" possibly the name of the fictitious millionaire Greame was working with earlier in the beginning of the episode

== Notes ==
- The office is decorated with posters of David Essex and David Cassidy, both of whom grow beards as the episode progresses.
- Tim's and Graeme's elderly selves are based on Teddy and Freddy, professorial characters from the duo's Broaden Your Mind series (and revived on the 2007 UK stage tour, The Goodies Still Rule OK).
- Bill remarks that "under this lot (his beard and moustache) I look a bit like Liza Minnelli". Bill would later shave-off his beard for Earthanasia.
- This episode is an example of a bottle episode; it was set completely in the Goodies' office, because the show's budget had run out.

== DVD and VHS releases ==
This episode has been released on both DVD and VHS.
