= Cunning Stunts =

Cunning Stunts is a Spoonerism. It may refer to:

- Cunning Stunts (Caravan album), 1975
- Cunning Stunts (Cows album), 1992
- Cunning Stunts (video), a 1998 concert video by Metallica
- Cunning Stunts (Goodies episode)
- Cunning Stunts (1970s feminist theatre company)
- Cunning Stunts, a 2017 downloadable update for Grand Theft Auto Online
