= That Old Black Magic (disambiguation) =

"That Old Black Magic" is a 1942 popular song.

That Old Black Magic may also refer to:

- That Old Black Magic (album), a 1965 album by Keely Smith
- "That Old Black Magic" (Charmed), an episode of Charmed
- "That Old Black Magic" (The Fairly OddParents), an episode of The Fairly OddParents
- "That Old Black Magic" (Farscape), an episode of Farscape
- "That Old Black Magic" (The Goodies), an episode of The Goodies
- "That Old Black Magic" (Sea of Souls), an episode of Sea of Souls
