= Football Crazy (disambiguation) =

Football Crazy is a song about football first written in the 1880s, later recorded by Scots folk duo Robin Hall and Jimmie Macgregor.

Football Crazy may also refer to

- "Football Crazy (The Goodies)", an episode of the Goodies.
- L'arbitro (1974 film), an Italian film also released under the English title of Football Crazy.
- "Football Crazy", an episode of Taggart.
- Nokia Football Crazy, a sports programme on Asian Fox Sports broadcast between 2005 and 2011.
