= The Dam Busters March =

Theme to the 1955 British war film The Dam Busters

The Dam Busters March is the theme for the 1955 British war film The Dam Busters. The musical composition, by Eric Coates, has become synonymous with both the film and the real Operation Chastise. The Dam Busters March remains a very popular accompaniment to flypasts in the UK.

== Origins ==
Coates's son, Austin Coates, recounted in a BBC radio interview that the march was not written for The Dam Busters. His father had been carrying out an exercise in composing a march that emulated the musical forms of Edward Elgar, such as in the Pomp and Circumstance Marches. A few days after completing the composition Coates was contacted by the film's producers. Coates had a profound dislike of writing film music and turned down the producers' numerous requests. Not until they told him that this was "a film of national importance" did he agree. On hearing more about the film, he came to the conclusion that the piece he had just finished would be a perfect overture. The march was performed for the film by the Associated British Studio Orchestra.

The film's musical score was completed by Leighton Lucas.

== Other usage ==
The Central Band of the Royal Air Force released a single of the march (HMV B10877) which reached 18 in the UK record charts on 21 October 1955.

The march is now the musical setting for the hymn "God is our strength and refuge", based on Psalm 46.

By the time the sheet music for the march was published in 1955, Carlene Mair had added the following lyrics:

Proudly, with high endeavour,
We, who are young forever,
Won the freedom of the skies.
We shall never die!
We who have made our story
Part of our Empire's [later: 'country's'] glory
Know our hearts will still live on
While Britons fly!

Fans of Lincoln City sing the song, with their arms outstretched imitating aircraft, after their team scores. It is also regularly played by Scottish football club Rangers F.C. post match.

The march was featured in the 1973 Christmas special of The Goodies television series, "The Goodies and the Beanstalk" and the 2nd episode of Series 7 "Dodonuts" as well the 6th episode "Holiday" of the 9th and final series.

Progressive rock band Jethro Tull concluded their concerts in the late 1970s and early 1980s with a rock rendition of the theme. It can be heard on their live 1978 album, Bursting Out.

In Chile, the orchestral version of this march was used for 40 years as a theme song for the radio news show "El Correo de Minería", in Radio Minería.

The march, with a lyric written for the occasion, was used as a theme song for the Norwegian YMCA Scouts national scout camp in Mandal, Norway in mid 1990.

In the early 1990s, Land Rover featured "The Dam Busters March" in a television advertisement for the Land Rover Defender.

In 1990, Carlsberg Group parodied the 1955 film including "The Dam Busters March" in a television advertisement for Carling Black Label beer. In 1994, the March and the idea of the bouncing bomb (this time a rolled-up towel towards a sunbed) were used in another Carlsberg advertisement.

A slightly re-arranged orchestral version is used in Danny Boyle's short film Happy and Glorious, made for London's 2012 Summer Olympics opening ceremony.

The song is featured on the high score screen of the Dragon 32 game Tea Time.
