= Royal Command =

- The Goodies episode
- Episode no.: Series 7 Episode 5
- Original air date: 6 December 1977

Guest appearances
- Ricky Newby; Terry Denton; Ernie Goodyear; Sheila Steafel as the voice of the Queen

Episode chronology
← Previous "Punky Business"	Next → "Earthanasia"

"Royal Command" is an episode of the British comedy television series The Goodies.

This episode is also known as "Royal Command Performance".

Written by Graeme Garden and Bill Oddie with songs and music by Bill Oddie.

== Plot ==
The Goodies are in charge of the Royal Command Performance, and the Royal family arrives for the occasion. Unfortunately Tim has not realised that the Royal family always went to sleep in boredom during the performances; Bill and Graeme are horrified to find them asleep and prod them awake. The result of actually seeing the performances makes them demand another show. Tim comments: "I'd be happy to be an OBE — best of all, an Earl and an OBE." Graeme, looking at Tim, comments: "You'd be an earlobe!"

The second show is presented to the crowned heads of the world. The acts, which include Rolf Harris and Brotherhood of Man, prove so unpopular that the Royals take control of the entertainment industry, introducing new series such as "Ponyrama with Dobbin Day"; as it turns cruel and violent, it turns the royalists into a pack of wild animals lashing out for blood, which shocks Tim in to shame.

When the Royal family are later injured from "Horse Riding on Ice" and bandaged in a hospital bought up by loony Graeme after the show flopped, so The Goodies take their place so that the Royal Family will not be missed by the public. Despite Tim's forceful attempt to get Bill and Greame to act regally, In order to make suitably refined and regal family entertainment rather than doing the undignified gallivanting antics like "Tumbling around with Horses on Ice", He almost has taken the role very seriously as well taking the royal command as an opportunity to put things right, as he clearly point out rightfully that the Royal Family appear to have "flipped their lids and screwed up their public image". A remount of the Coronation is announced as a tourist grab, which the real Queen accepts, due to having missed it the first time (She was assuming that the Chancellor of the Excheque meant rerun of Queen's actual 1953 coronation on TV). The Goodies move into Buckingham Palace, with Tim pretending to be the Queen, Bill pretending to be Prince Charles, Graeme pretending to be Princess Anne, and a store mannequin is brought in to be the Duke of Edinburgh — and they make an appearance on the balcony where they wave to cheering onlookers. The Royal family, who are watching everything on television from their hospital beds, are pleased with what is happening, until they realise The Goodies intend to re-enact the Coronation, in Westminster Abbey, with the genuine Archbishop of Canterbury, so that Tim will be crowned as the Queen and the Goodies will be the new "Royal Family".

The Queen, Duke, Prince Charles and Princess Anne leave their hospital beds to defend their rights as the Royal family and to get rid of the imposters — and a rush for the Coronation Crown ensues. Eventually, The Goodies are the new rulers, while the former Royals get their own comedy series on BBC 2

== Cultural references ==
- Royal Variety Performance
- The British Royal Family

== DVD and VHS releases ==
This episode has been released on DVD.
