= Oscar James =

Trinidadian actor (born 1942)

- Born: 25 July 1942 (age 84); Trinidad, West Indies
- Occupation: Actor
- Notable work: Tony Carpenter in EastEnders (1985–1987)

Oscar James (born 25 July 1942) is a Trinidadian actor who is based in the United Kingdom. He has had a long and varied career, but is best known for appearing on British television, in particular the BBC soap opera EastEnders, in which he was one of the original 23 cast members as Tony Carpenter, a role he played for over two years. He also made an appearance in the 2005 film Charlie and the Chocolate Factory as the shopkeeper.

== Early life ==
Oscar James was born on 25 July 1942 in Trinidad, and had a poor upbringing. He came to the United Kingdom in the 1950s. He initially worked as a taxi driver, a dish-washer and also a gymnast, but he always had aspirations to be an entertainer and followed his dream by becoming an actor.

== Career ==
Roles for black actors were sparse during James' early career, but he persevered to become the fourth black actor to join the Royal Shakespeare Company and the first black actor to play Macbeth.

In 1972, he co-founded with fellow actor Alton Kumalo the first black British theatre company, Temba (the name derived from the Zulu word for "hope"), initially to produce new black writing from Britain and South Africa. Temba staged the first British production of Athol Fugard's play Sizwe Bansi is Dead.

James had early roles in television programmes such as Softly, Softly (1966);Love Thy Neighbour (1975); Quiller (1975); Till Death Us Do Part (1975); The Goodies (the 1975 episode "South Africa", in which he played Enoch Powell); Gangsters (1976); Angels (1976); The Professionals; Out (1978); Minder (1979); Shoestring (1980); Tales of the Unexpected (1981), and The Gentle Touch (1984).

He was the first black actor to appear in the ITV soap opera Emmerdale Farm in 1978 as Antony Moeketsi, an African teacher who taught Seth Armstrong to read. However, he is best known for his role as Tony Carpenter one of the original cast members, appearing in the series from its debut in 1985 until 1987 in the BBC television soap opera EastEnders.

Other TV credits include: Minder in the Series 1 episode "Come in T-64, Your Time Is Ticking Away" (1979), Casualty (1996), Lovejoy (1994), London's Burning (2002), Doctors (2002; 2005), The Bill (2006), Crocodile Shoes II (2006), The Line of Beauty (2006), Holby City (2006), Dream Team (2002), Afterlife (2005), and the television drama Angel Cake (2006). He has also appeared in several films, including the 1977 film Black Joy, where he played loan shark Jomo, and the 2005, where he played the shopkeeper in whose shop Charlie Bucket finds the final Golden Ticket in the Tim Burton adaptation of Charlie and the Chocolate Factory.

In 2004, James played Herbert in Oxford Road: the Story, a radio play in which he worked alongside Doña Croll, an actress with whom he had previously worked in Kwame Kwei-Armah's play Elmina's Kitchen at the National Theatre. This was adapted into a BBC Four televised film in 2005, in which James also starred in Elmina's Kitchen.

== Personal life ==
James resides in north London.

== Partial filmography ==
- A Matter of Choice (1963) – Dancing man at club (uncredited)
- Man in the Middle (1964) – Court Martial stenographer (uncredited)
- Never Mention Murder (1965) – Hospital Orderly (uncredited)
- Naked Evil (1966) – Dupree
- Carry On Up the Jungle (1970) – Nosha Warrior (uncredited)
- The Breaking of Bumbo (1970) – Second Student
- All the Right Noises (1971) – Guard
- Gumshoe (1971) – Azinge
- Peter Pan (1976) – Pirate
- Pressure (1976) – Colin
- Black Joy (1977) – Jomo
- Jaguar Lives! (1979) – Collins
- Gloo Joo (1979) - Meadowlark
- Student Bodies (1981) – Football Coach
- Last Night at the Alamo (1983) – Dub
- Water (1985) – Miguel
- Three Kinds of Heat (1987) – Unle Joe
- Hardware (1990) – Chief
- My Kingdom (2001) – Desmond
- If Only (2004) – Superintendent
- Charlie and the Chocolate Factory (2005) – Shopkeeper
- Shoot the Messenger (2006) – Rodney Pascale
- Oh Happy Day (2007) – Storekeeper
- Deadmeat (2007) – Detective Peters
