= Goodies and Politics =

- The Goodies episode
- Episode no.: Series 8 Episode 1
- Original air date: 14 January 1980

Guest appearances
- David Dimbleby as David Dimbumblum; Corbet Woodall as himself (the Newsreader); Jo Kendall as the voice of the Queen; Nicholas McArdle; Rosemary Faith; Penny Irving; Maria Eldridge; Joan Blackham

Episode chronology
← Previous "Earthanasia"	Next → "Saturday Night Grease"

"Goodies and Politics" is the first episode of the eighth series of the British television comedy series The Goodies. The 64th episode of the show overall, it was first broadcast at 8.10pm on BBC2.

This episode is also known as "Politics" and "Timita".

Written by Graeme Garden and Bill Oddie, with songs and music by Bill Oddie.

== Plot ==
The British prime minister has discovered a loophole in tax laws and retired to the Bahamas. Her government and the opposition members of parliament give themselves a massive pay rise and join her, leaving Britain without a government. The Queen telephones the Goodies and requests their assistance in finding a new leader for the country. In a parody of Evita, Tim and Bill stand for election - Tim as "Timita" (who attempts to make a nicer Britain) and Bill as "Che" (who attempts to start a revolutionary Britain). However, the election is tied at one vote each, as the televised campaign period was so exciting and entertaining that no one bothered to vote, apart from the two candidates. Timita and Che reluctantly form a coalition government, which ends up involved in absurd game show antics (devised by Graeme) and chaotic resuits of the poor political actions of Tim and Bill. The episode ends with the news that Margaret Thatcher will return to Britain.

== Cultural references ==
- Margaret Thatcher
- Evita
- Eva Perón
- Che Guevara
- It's a Knockout
- Song: "Don't Cry for Me Argentina" - Tim sings to his two female helpers: "Don't cry for me, Marge and Tina."
- Stuart Hall
