= The Goodies and the Beanstalk =

- The Goodies episode
- Episode no.: Series 4 Episode 4
- Original air date: 24 December 1973

Guest appearances
- Alfie Bass as Giant; Eddie Waring as himself (sports commentator); John Cleese as Genie; Corbet Woodall as himself (the Newsreader); Robert Bridges; Marcelle Samett as Girl in the bath; Toni Harris as Policewoman; Helli Louise as Girl with the puppies; Marty Swift as the dancing policeman; Arthur Ellis

Episode chronology
← Previous "Hospital for Hire"	Next → "The Stone Age"

"The Goodies and the Beanstalk" is a special episode of the British comedy television series The Goodies. Written by The Goodies, with songs and music by Bill Oddie.

== Plot ==
Homeless and penniless, the Goodies have no food and are sleeping on park benches. Graeme and Tim decide to sell their trandem, but Bill is devastated. Bill takes the trandem, which he has named "Buttercup", to the market the next morning, but all he receives is a tin of baked beans because the trandem is roundly ridiculed by the crowd of bike bidders.

Tim empties the contents of the tin onto Bill's head, but Graeme decides to plant one of the beans — 'just in case'. To the Goodies' surprise, a giant-sized beanstalk shoots up behind them. The beanstalk crosses the English channel and continues to grow along the ground until it reaches the foot of Mount Everest. Bill borrows a flute from a snakecharmer — with the beanstalk then climbing up the side of the mountain and disappearing into some clouds at the top.

Tim notices an ad in a newspaper for competitors for It's a Knockout — part of the competition being to climb the beanstalk. With nothing to lose, the Goodies decide to represent Britain. Other countries being represented include Germany and Italy, whose contestants meet a gruesome end.

At the top of the beanstalk, a castle can be seen in the distance. Gaining entry into the castle, the Goodies discover a room with several gold eggs. When they leave the room with as many gold eggs as they can carry, they find themselves in a very large room with a very high ceiling, a giant-size coffee mug and an enormous recipe book, with a recipe for "Shepherd's Pie" (beginning with the instruction 'first peel two shepherds'). Then, hearing the words "Fe, Fo, Fi, Fum", Bill comments that it must be the Giant. The Goodies try to hide, with Bill climbing into the giant's mug.

The 'giant', who turns out to be surprisingly small in size, promises the Goodies that they will be paid in gold eggs (created using a formula he had developed when he was a zookeeper), if they remain in the castle and work for him. However, the 'giant' is very demanding and all the Goodies want to go home again. Imitating the Marx Brothers (with Graeme as "Groucho", Tim as "Harpo", and Bill as "Chico") and singing "Who Wants To Be a Millionaire?", they pretend that riches do not interest them. Then, while the 'giant' is asleep, they collect their sacks of gold eggs and leave the castle — causing the birds to protest loudly at the theft. Waking from his sleep, the 'giant' orders his birds to go after the Goodies and chaos ensues as the birds take their revenge.

When they are at last able to return to the base of Mount Everest, the Goodies discover that the magic bean tin has one more surprise for them.

== Cast ==
- Tim Brooke-Taylor - himself
- Graeme Garden - himself
- Bill Oddie - himself
- Alfie Bass - the "giant"
- Eddie Waring - himself
- John Cleese - the genie
- Corbet Woodall - the newsreader

== Songs and music ==
- Music — for the song "Climb Ev'ry Mountain" (from the movie The Sound of Music)
- Song — "Who Wants to be a Millionaire?" (from the movie High Society)
- Music — "Dambusters March" (from the film The Dam Busters)
- Music — from the ballet Coppélia

== DVD and VHS releases ==
This episode has been released on both DVD and VHS.

The Goodies and the Beanstalk was first released by BBC Video in 1983, on VHS BBCV 4008 and Betamax BBCB 4008, running time 44 minutes, and again in 1994 (BBCV 5370) with two other Goodies episodes - The End and Bunfight at the O.K. Tea Rooms, a budget release of this VHS followed in 1996 (BBCV 5830). Also released in Australia by ABC video B00100.

A restored version was released on The Goodies ... At Last from Network Video on 28 April 2003 (VHS 7951171/DVD 7952171), this also featured a selectable laughter free audio track and a feature on the digital restoration of the episode. Released in Australia as The Goodies - 8 Delicious Episodes on 1 September 2003 and The Goodies - The Tasty Box in 2005 and again in The Goodies - The Tasty Tin by ABC DVD.

The episode was included in The Complete BBC Collection DVD released in 2018.
