= Saturday Night Grease =

- The Goodies episode
- Episode no.: Series 8 Episode 2
- Original air date: 21 January 1980

Guest appearances
- Maria Eldridge; Chris Eymand; Spencer Shires; Okon Jones; Sandy Strallen; Mark White; David Machin

Episode chronology
| ← Previous "Goodies and Politics" | Next → "A Kick in the Arts" |

"Saturday Night Grease" is the second episode of the eighth series of the British television comedy series The Goodies. The 65th episode of the show overall, it was first broadcast at 8.10pm on 21 January 1980 on BBC2.

This episode is also known as "Discotheque".. It was written by Graeme Garden and Bill Oddie.

== Plot ==
Tim has developed a crush on Olivia Newton-John, whose portrait has replaced that of Queen Elizabeth II on his wall. His obsession prompts him to emulate the mannerisms, hairstyle and fashions exhibited by Newton-John's Grease co-star, John Travolta, in Saturday Night Fever, although he admits to not having seen the latter film because of its X-rating. Tim visits a disco but is promptly ejected. He returns home and confides in Graeme and Bill that he is visiting discos in the hope of finding a date.

Graeme and Bill offer to accompany Tim to a disco. Bill wears a tail-coat with ridiculously long tails and tap shoes with actual taps on them. Graeme wears a pink ballet dress, parodying the pink ladies of Grease. When Tim confesses his inability to dance, Graeme teaches him the Disco Heave, part of which involves miming vomiting induced by hearing a Max Bygraves record. But, once the teachings done Graeme was utterly revolted by the prospect of "snogging when the impatient Tim gets carried away with his smutting behaviour and hot-headedly decides to go out dancing by himself (using his "smoky urban charm" for some "choreographed canoodling, heavy petting and I'm gonna do it my way!").

However at the disco, mixed dancing is forbidden. Tim is arrested for touching a girl when he got carried away in attempting to dance with her like a gentleman (Because he's more used to social dancing). Bill sets up his own disco, called "Disco Billius", which is so exclusive that even celebrities are denied entry due to Bill's ridiculous rules. Graeme visits Bill to seek help to bail Tim out of prison. But Bill is more interested in organising his gimmick and the idea of a mixed dancing competition to be televised by the BBC, which will provide prize money of £5,000. Graeme surmises that no one will be willing to perform mixed dancing in front of the cameras, so Bill's competition will be declared null and void and the prize money will therefore go to him as organiser. Graeme bails Tim out of prison 'on account', and they enter the 'Panorama Disco Dancing Championships' hosted by Robin Yad (a spoof of Robin Day or obviously truly him in disguise). With Graeme dressed as Newton-John's Sandy Olsson and Tim as Travolta's Danny Zuko from Grease, they perform You're The One That I Want. At the end of their winning performance, Bill removes Graeme's Sandy wig, revealing him to be a man. Bill tries to claim the money by default, while Tim delivers an impassioned speech in defense of mixed dancing, which prompts all present to dance together to the Tennessee Waltz. The police intervene to stop the mixed dancing and then give chase to the three Goodies. Ensuing chase sequences spoof the Hustle, West Side Story, the Village People's In the Navy, The Wizard of Oz, an Indian rain dance, Singin' in the Rain and the Hawaiian hula, culminating a choreographed brawl that spoofs the orchestrated ultra-violence of A Clockwork Orange.

== Cultural references ==
- Grease
- Saturday Night Fever
- Bee Gees – Tim imitates Barry Gibb's falsetto from the Night Fever & Stayin' Alive songs when his tight trousers are zipped up.
- John Travolta
- Olivia Newton-John
- Network
- The Village People
- Robin Day – spoofed as Robin Yad
- Top Hat – dance sequence
- Singin' in the Rain – dance sequence with umbrellas
- The Wizard of Oz – dance sequence, with the music of the song Follow the Yellow Brick Road
- West Side Story – dance sequence
- A Clockwork Orange - brawl sequence
- Fred Astaire and Ginger Rogers – name of cafe
- The Hustle (song) – classic 1970s disco instrumental
- Bianca Jagger – cardboard posters for Bill's disco club and his ridiclulous rules of allowing people in

== Notes ==
This was the first episode of The Goodies that 'Clean-Up TV' campaigner Mary Whitehouse complained about - even though the trio had made many attempts to annoy her after she called them "wholesome entertainment" in 1970 (the episode "Gender Education" parodied Whitehouse). She complained, "Tim Brooke-Taylor was seen undressing to mock John Travolta in an exceedingly tight pair of underpants”. Her complaint was against the opening scene, in which Tim's underpants had a distinctive carrot motif on the front." She described The Goodies as "too sexually orientated".

The episode was filmed in early 1979, when disco music was at its height, and movies like Saturday Night Fever and Grease were box-office hits.

== DVD and VHS releases ==
This episode has been released on both DVD and VHS.
