= Clown Virus =

- The Goodies episode
- Episode no.: Series 5 Episode 2
- Original air date: 17 February 1975

Guest appearances
- John Bluthal as Major Charles M. Cheeseburger; Peter Dyneley as General Of the Pentagon; Corbet Woodall as himself (the Newsreader); Ramsay Williams as The Plantation Owner

Episode chronology
← Previous "The Movies"	Next → "Chubbie Chumps"

"Clown Virus" is an episode of the British comedy television series The Goodies.

Written by The Goodies, with songs and music by Bill Oddie.

== Plot ==
When the United States Army asks the Goodies to get rid of a large container, with the words Tomato soup on its side, they take it out to sea in an attempt to ditch it — but without success. They then take the container to their office, where they open it and find a strange-looking mixture inside.

In an effort to make the mixture look more like Tomato soup, and more palatable, Tim pours red paint into the mixture in their soup bowls, and the trio attempt to eat the mixture. The 'soup' tastes horrible and makes them feel ill. The Goodies sell the remainder of the mixture to Thirtes (who intend to serve the mixture as soup at Motorway service areas), and to service stations (which intend to use the mixture as petrol).

Back at the Goodies' domain, something strange is taking effect — Tim's nose has turned red. Bill comments that he had never noticed that Tim had a small red nose before. Tim states that he does not have a 'small red nose', to which Graeme replies: "No, you don't have a small red nose - you have a BIG red nose!". Tim is turning into a clown — closely followed by Bill and Graeme also turning into clowns.

The Goodies discover that people, everywhere, are turning into clowns, and come to the conclusion that the 'soup' was not soup after all, but something else. Arriving back at the base the Goodies find a sheet confirming the 'soup' was in fact a prototype liquidised nerve gas that caused people and certain objects to take form and behave in a clownish manner.

The Goodies confront Major Cheeseburger about what is happening, and he exclaims: "Well, I'll be horn-swoggled!" to which Graeme comments: "Your personal life is no concern of ours." The trio ask Major how to get themselves back to normal, but he there is no way to undo the effects. After the confrontation with the Major, who claims he was "just obeying orders", a screen appears showing the Major's superior in the Pentagon, who then reveals the nerve gas was a key factor in their planned invasion of the United Kingdom and making it part of the US.

A small US platoon of troops land on a beach with little expectation of resistance. To their surprise, the Goodies, still in clown form, overwhelm them in various clown methods. Despite getting blown up, blasted and pied, the US troops are about to launch their final attack when out from nowhere, a US plantation owner comes out from nowhere and orders the troops to get back to his farm. The Goodies watch silently as the farmer whips the troops back to America, knowing Britain is saved.
