= Lighthouse Keeping Loonies =

- The Goodies episode
- Episode no.: Series 5 Episode 8
- Original air date: 31 March 1975

Guest appearances
- Corbet Woodall as himself (the Newsreader); Patrick Moore as himself (the Astronomer)

Episode chronology
← Previous "Kung Fu Kapers"	Next → "Rome Antics"

"Lighthouse Keeping Loonies" is an episode of the British comedy television series The Goodies.

This episode is also known as "The Lighthouse Men" and as "A Little Lighthouse Keeping" and also as "Lighthouse Loonies".

Written by The Goodies, with songs and music by Bill Oddie.

== Plot ==
The Goodies are taken to a lighthouse for five years since Graeme signed them up for it, although he then confesses that he mistakenly thought the advert said 'a little light housekeeping' when he misread it.

The lighthouse they are taken to is the mysterious sinister "Jollyrock Lighthouse", where lighthouse keepers have been disappearing. The Goodies enter the lighthouse via a zip-line, with Bill coming last in a large pair of underpants. Tim immediately proclaims himself 'Number 1', with Bill and Graeme as 'Number 2's'. Tim orders Graeme to light the lamp which, after some complaining, he does. Graeme tries to read a book by the lamp, creating interesting artistic animal shadow shapes on cliffs as he tries to follow it around.

Meanwhile, Tim was fishing from inside the lighthouse with lack of success fixing up supper as frustrated Bill objects to everything in the lighthouse being round while he's pacing in circles. Even the cards and chessboard are round oddly enough. After Tim serves him a round lemon meringue pie, Tim tries to convince Bill that it's square, but Bill is not buying his lies and chases him around the table, eventually splattering him with it. Bill felt better for taking his frustration on Tim who's feels worse and blames on Bill. Graeme comes back down with his clothes in tatters, having been ravaged by moths. Bill then finds a book of sea shanties, in which they discover a song about the Jollyrock, which they commence to sing, in the hopes that it will lift their spirits. Unfortunately, it has the opposite effect, as they discover when they begin singing, as the song graphically tells of the terrors of the Jollyrock like Tim catching Mumps.

Tim is then forcibly quarantined in the lamp room. Bill and Graeme are enjoying themselves playing cards while Tim is up in the lamp room bellowing about being locked up there on his own. When Bill and Graeme listen to the radio for a forecast warning, they go to tend the lamp as Tim crashes in, bellowing "I SAID CAN YOU HEAR ME?!". Bill asks what's the matter and Tim explains that the lamp has gone out. Graeme inspects the problem as Tim and Bill try to fix the lamp. They find out that it wasn't busted, but "just ran out of oil, that's all". The Goodies couldn't get some fuel because Bill had thrown the great big barrel of oil away by mistake, when he using to cook fish 'n' chips with it the other day thinking it was cooking oil, And Graeme complained how horrible and greasy the food was, (after an initial complaint, he acknowledges "As long as you've got a good excuse!") — even Tim's baby oil is not enough to run a 10 million candlepower lamp, so Bill wears a candle on his head to go round in circles, while Tim and Graeme try to find some way and something to warn the ships. Tim comes up with the bright idea to warn the ships by launching a rocket, but he foolishly lights-up the rocket inside the lighthouse instead of outside. Graeme bellows "AHH!! NOT IN HERE, YOU FOOL!!!", and panics as he and Tim desperately try to get rid of the rocket by throwing it out of the door, but the storm is too strong, so they go through the window. Tim holds the rocket but doesn't let go of it, and he and the rocket zoom out of the air and Tim is dumped back on the glass roof of the lamp room.

Graeme gets out the foghorn, but when he tries to stop it by unplugging it and smashing it, it continues to work. Tim finds the offending part, but when Graeme desperately swallows it to quiet it down, he becomes the foghorn. He leans out of the window to warn the ships, but the foghorn stops and all he can do is quack. After he has a drink, this too stops. There is a very heavy fog, and several famous ships are coming near the lighthouse, such as the QE2 and the Britannia. As the Britannia passes, a white glove (presumably the Queen's) waves through the window and another hand (presumably the Duke of Edinburgh's) makes a rude gesture at Tim.

Graeme sends Bill to dig under the lighthouse to find more fuel for the lamp. He then finds coal, but they can't light it since they have no matches and the lighter has no petrol. Eventually, Bill finds oil, but Tim gets squirted with it. Once the lighter is full of oil, Tim goes to have a bath, whilst Graeme and Bill celebrate their find. Bill goes down to check the pressure, but he can't see, so he asks Graeme to drop the lighter though the opening to light his candle. They both suddenly realize, too late, that having lit a candle is very dangerous amongst the oil that Bill has found. All of a sudden there is a terrific roar, and the lighthouse takes off at enormous speed.

Bill and Graeme decide to try to halt the lighthouse's upward flight and return to Earth, by running around the outside of the lighthouse to overbalance it. The lighthouse's position then changes from vertical to horizontal flight, prompting the following conclusions from various onlookers:

A news broadcast is shown about the missing lighthouse, with Photofit pictures of the Queen and Prince Philip. Other items on the news broadcast included the following:

- a UFO 'sighting' of the lighthouse, where an inhabitant of the craft (Tim in the bath) is described as 'holding a rubber duck and wearing a hat of frilly pink plastic'. The chairman of the They've Already Landed society claims that this is the standard uniform of the Venusian space fleet.
- Religious groups are regarding this sighting as a second coming.
- Lastly, a new comet has been discovered, to the great excitement of astronomer Patrick Moore.

After a while, the lighthouse slows down enough to go into orbit around the Earth and lands on Nelson's Column (complete with pigeon), causing Tim's mumps to pass on to the other two, including Nelson's statue and curing Tim in the process — and, with no lighthouse to guide it, an ocean liner can be seen sailing along one of London's streets.

== Music and song ==
- The music which is used for the carousel in the musical, and film, Carousel.
- "The Song of The Jollyrock Lighthouse" - written by Bill Oddie
- "A Walk In The Black Forest" - by Horst Jankowski.

== DVD and VHS releases ==
This episode has been released on both DVD and VHS.
