= Dee Robson =

British costume designer

Dee Robson is a former costume designer for the BBC. Robson was born in Liverpool. She studied art at the Southport School of Fine Arts, Lancashire, and design for theatre at the Wimbledon College of Art. She is now based in London. The inspiration for her monster and costume designs comes from many sources, such as Russian ballet and Memento mori statues. Robson worked under the fashion designer Mary Quant. She has worked for some of Britain's leading theatres:

- The London Ballet company
- The Oxford Playhouse
- Liverpool Playhouse
- Pitlochry Festival Theatre
- Yvonne Arnaud Theatre
- Welsh Theatre Company

== List of TV work ==
- Moonbase 3 (1973)
- The Goodies:
  - "The Goodies Rule – O.K.?" (1975)
- Blake's 7:
  - "Powerplay" (1980)
  - "Aftermath" (1980)
- The Hitchhiker's Guide to the Galaxy (1981)
- Blackadder:
  - Unaired pilot (1982)
- Doctor Who:
  - "Arc of Infinity" (1983)
  - "Terminus" (1983)
- No Place Like Home
- Grange Hill
- EastEnders
