= The Movies (The Goodies) =

- The Goodies episode
- Episode no.: Series 5 Episode 1
- Original air date: 10 February 1975

Guest appearances
- Ernie Goodyear as Buster Keaton / Keystone Kop / Cameraman; Melita Clarke as Delilah

Episode chronology
← Previous "The Race"	Next → "Clown Virus"

"The Movies" is an episode of the British comedy television series The Goodies.

This episode is also known as "The British Film Industry" and "The Black & White, Western, Epic Movie" as well as "BBC" and "The Choices of Film Creation".

As with other episodes in the series, this episode was written by members of The Goodies, with songs and music by Bill Oddie.

== Award ==
The Goodies won the Silver Rose in 1975 for this episode at the Festival Rose d'Or, held in Montreux, Switzerland.

== Plot ==
After complaining about the decline of the British film industry, the trio purchase Pinetree Studios (for £25) in the hope of making some good films. They then fire all the directors, whom they consider to be making films which are either "very boring or extremely pretentious in many cases both" and decide to make a film themselves.

Their attempt to remake Macbeth with less violence and more family interest is a complete failure, and leads to the three Goodies falling out with each other and attempting to make their own films, separately. Tim wants to make a Biblical epic — while Graeme wants to make a violent Western, and Bill wants to make a silent black and white comedy (believing that to do this he has to paint everything monochrome, and not talk). Bill comments: "Buster Keaton must have spent three weeks painting the whole town black and white. And then a ruddy great building falls on him, and he doesn't make a sound."

Arguing over which type of film should be made, Graeme comments to Tim: "At least I can act which is more than I can say for some people present." Feeling hurt, Tim asks: "And what's that supposed to mean?" to which Graeme replies: "Well lets face it darling, you're no Glenda Jackson are you?"

Later, they start filming in an overcrowded studio outside, but wherever Tim, Bill and the other casts and film crews go, they keep running into Graeme's film set which is bigger than the others, as well as running into each other's sets. Bill joins up with his favourite legendary comedians Charlie Chaplin, Buster Keaton and Laurel and Hardy. Then the battle of the Goodies begins when Tim's film crew bump into Graeme's film crew and all three extras fight alongside the Goodies. But the fight doesn't go well as the Goodies get hurt by their own extras. So they flee around the studios arguing and running about in the theatre. When the Goodies reunite, on stage, they are still arguing - until the huge word "The End" appears to drag the Goodies up in the air as they call for help.

== Cultural references ==
- Elstree Studios and Pinewood Studios
- Silent films
- Western movies
- Samson and Delilah
- Epic films
- Keystone Cops
- Buster Keaton
- Charlie Chaplin
- Laurel and Hardy
- The Sound of Music
- Macbeth
- Mae West
- Frankenstein's Monster
- Death In Venice

== Notes ==
- This is the first episode where Tim wears his iconic Union Jack waistcoat. This look would remain his staple signature costume throughout the series until its cancellation.
- The Spanish town seen in the episode was a standing exterior set at Pinewood Studios. It can also be seen in the film Carry On Abroad.
- Among the directors sacked by Tim are Franco Zeffirelli, Stanley Kubrick, Ken Russell, Sam Peckinpah, Federico Fellini and Andy Warhol.
- Bill Oddie has compared the middle sequence in which the Goodies view a rough edit of their film-making efforts to "funny movies you make with your family on Boxing Day".

== DVD and VHS releases ==
This episode has been released on DVD.
