= That Old Black Magic (The Goodies) =

- The Goodies episode
- Episode no.: Series 3 Episode 4
- Directed by: Bob Spiers
- Original air date: 25 February 1973

Guest appearance
- Patricia Hayes as Hazel the Witch

Episode chronology
← Previous "Winter Olympics"	Next → "For Those in Peril on the Sea"

"That Old Black Magic" (also known as "Black Magic" and "Which Witch is Which?") is an episode of the British comedy television series The Goodies. Written by The Goodies, with songs and music by Bill Oddie with Patricia Hayes as guest star.

== Plot ==
A witch named Hazel comes to the Goodies office, commenting that one of them has the power and that she wants to hold a séance with them so that she can conjure up spirits of humans instead of spirits of animals (which have been her only success). The Goodies think that she is a lunatic — but they decide to hold the séance she has requested, and to play tricks on her. During the séance with Hazel, Graeme unexpectedly becomes possessed by an evil force.

Graeme starts a coven, and Tim and Bill become worried about their public image, because Graeme is continuing to wear his "Goodies T-shirt". Looking around the coven area, Tim and Bill notice a sign with the words "Virgins wanted". Later, wanting to stop Graeme, they arrive, pretending to be the sacrificial virgins that Graeme has advertised for, and wearing long white dresses and long blonde wigs (Graeme complains about their appearance but decides to let them in anyway). Graeme, who has now changed his clothes, does some magic tricks, and is about to carry out the sacrifice of the two "virgins", and summons up the devil (who appears to be a parody of David Frost). However Hazel arrives, compels the devil to leave, and casts a spell over him, and the evil spirit leaves Graeme's body — only to be replaced by that of a spirit of a very lively and active gibbon, which Tim and Bill find difficult to capture.

When Graeme is eventually captured, Hazel is able to get the gibbon spirit to leave his body and he returns to normal. Then, tearing the pages from her book of spells, Hazel states that she will never use magic again, but her words are short-lived. Tim and Bill had also become unexpectedly possessed — by the spirits of a chicken and a dog.
