= A Kick in the Arts =

- The Goodies episode
- Episode no.: Series 8 Episode 3
- Original air date: 28 January 1980

Guest appearances
- Ballard Berkeley as Chairman of the British Olympic Committee; Roland MacLeod; Norman Mitchell as Boxing Announcer; Guy Deghy; Cud Child; Barry Cryer; Tony Gubba; Marie Sutherland

Episode chronology
← Previous "Saturday Night Grease"	Next → "U-Friend or UFO?"

"A Kick in the Arts" is the third episode of the eighth series of the British television comedy series The Goodies. The 66th episode of the show overall, it was first broadcast at 8.10pm on 28 January 1980 on BBC2.

This episode is also known as "Summer Olympics".

Written by Graeme Garden and Bill Oddie with songs and music by Bill Oddie.

== Plot ==
Britain's athletes are impoverished and starving. Tim tries to help, but after losing money and his clothes to gambling hustlers Bill and Graeme, ends up becoming an athlete too. To survive, the athletes turn to crime, and Tim steals the Queen's tiara as she greets spectators. Tim and the other athletes are eventually imprisoned for their crimes.

Meanwhile, Graeme poses as Australian sports entrepreneur "Kerry Thwacker" and imports athletes from all around the world to make up his own Olympics team — with the intention of giving the team to Tim.

Because all of the athletes have disappeared, and not knowing what Graeme and Bill are up to, Tim augments the composition of the Summer Olympics with poetry and literature to improve Britain's chances of victory. Under the changed rules, athletic prowess is no longer enough to guarantee Olympic victory and actors become the new champions.

== Cultural references ==
- A vast list of English arts and academic persons were 'participants' as part of the UK team, including:

J. B. Priestley, Rita Hunter, A J P Taylor, John Betjeman, Francis Bacon, David Hockney, Laurence Olivier

- Summer Olympics
- Kerry Packer — an Australian media tycoon who was personally responsible for the foundation of World Series Cricket — spoofed as Kerry Thwacker
