= Robin Day =

British broadcaster (1923–2000)

Sir Robin Day
- Born: 24 October 1923; London, England
- Died: 6 August 2000 (aged 76); London, England
- Resting place: Church of St Candida and Holy Cross, Whitchurch Canonicorum, Dorset
- Education: Brentwood School, Essex; The Crypt School; Bembridge School; St Edmund Hall, Oxford
- Known for: Broadcast journalism
- Political party: Liberal (1959)
- Spouse: Katherine Ainslie (m. 1965; div. 1986)
- Children: 2
- Military career
- Allegiance: United Kingdom
- Branch: British Army
- Service years: 1943–1947
- Rank: Lieutenant
- Units: Royal Artillery
- Conflicts: Second World War

Sir Robin Day (24 October 1923 – 6 August 2000) was an English political journalist and television and radio broadcaster.

Day's obituary in The Guardian by Dick Taverne stated that he was "the most outstanding television journalist of his generation. He transformed the television interview, changed the relationship between politicians and television, and strove to assert balance and rationality into the medium's treatment of current affairs".

== Early life ==
Robin Day was born on 24 October 1923 in Hampstead Garden Suburb, London, the youngest of four children of William Day (c. 1885 – c. 1948), a Post Office telephone engineer who became a GPO administrative manager, and his wife Florence. He received his early formal education at Brentwood School from 1934 to 1938, briefly attended the Crypt School, Gloucester, and later Bembridge School on the Isle of Wight.

During World War II, he received a commission into the British Army's Royal Artillery, with which he served from 1943. He was deployed to East Africa and saw little action. He was discharged from the British Army in 1947 with the rank of Lieutenant, and went up to St Edmund Hall, Oxford, to read law. While at university, he was elected president of the Oxford Union debating society, and also took part in a debating tour of the United States of America, run by the English-Speaking Union.

He was called to the Bar at Middle Temple in 1952, but practised law only briefly.

== Journalistic career ==
Day spent almost his entire working life in journalism. He rose to prominence on the new Independent Television News (ITN) from 1955. According to Dick Taverne, Day first came to notice by interviewing Sir Kenneth Clark, then chairman of the regulator Independent Television Authority (ITA). The ITA had proposed to cut ITN's broadcasting hours and finances. Day's direct, non-deferential approach was then entirely new. He was the first British journalist to interview Egypt's President Nasser following the Suez Crisis.

In 1958, Day interviewed Prime Minister Harold Macmillan, in what the Daily Express called "the most vigorous cross-examination a prime minister has been subjected to in public". The interview turned Day into a television personality and was probably the first time that British television became a serious part of the political process. He was on the staff of ITN for four years, resigning to stand at the 1959 general election as a Liberal Party candidate for Hereford but was not elected. Following a brief period at the News Chronicle, he moved to the BBC.

He was a regular fixture on all BBC general election night programmes from the 1960s until 1987. On television, he presented Panorama and chaired Question Time (1979–89).

In the early 1970s, Day worked on BBC Radio, where he proved an innovator with It's Your Line (1970–76). This was a national phone-in programme that enabled ordinary people, for the first time, to put questions directly to the prime minister and other politicians (it later spawned Election Call). He also presented The World at One from 1979 to 1987. In the 1981 New Year Honours, he was knighted for his services to broadcasting.

He became known in British broadcasting as "the Grand Inquisitor" for his abrasive interviewing of politicians, a style out of keeping with the British media's habitual deference to authority in the early days of his career.

In October 1982, during a Newsnight interview with the Conservative Secretary of State for Defence, John Nott, pursuing cuts in defence expenditure, in particular Royal Navy, Day posed the question: "Why should the public on this issue believe you, a transient, here today and, if I may say so, gone tomorrow politician rather than a senior officer of many years' experience?" Nott, who had announced that he was to retire at the next general election, removed his own microphone and walked off the set. Nott's autobiography in 2003 was called Here Today Gone Tomorrow: Recollections of an Errant Politician in reference to the incident.

After leaving Question Time, Day moved to the new satellite service BSB, where he presented the weekly political discussion programme Now Sir Robin. When BSB merged with Sky Television, the programme continued to be broadcast on Sky News for a while. During the 1992 general election campaign, he returned to the BBC to host roundtable discussions with senior politicians on BBC Breakfast News and he also conducted long-form interviews with all three main party leaders for ITV as part of the Thames Television programme This Week. On the night of the 1992 general election itself, Day resumed his role as interviewer, this time on ITN's general election night coverage, broadcast on ITV.

During the mid-1990s, he regularly contributed to the lunchtime Channel 4 political programme Around the House and presented Central Lobby for Central, the ITV franchise in the Midlands. That show was sometimes aired at the same time as his old programme Question Time was being broadcast by the BBC.

For 25 years, he campaigned tirelessly, and eventually successfully, for the televising of Parliament – not in the interests of television, but of Parliament itself. He claimed that he was the first to present the detailed arguments in favour, in a Hansard Society paper in 1963.

Monty Python's Flying Circus often referred to Day – for example, in the "Eddie Baby" sketch, in which John Cleese turns to the camera and states: "Robin Day's got a hedgehog called Frank." In another sketch, Eric Idle said that he was able to return his "Robin Day tie" to Harrods. Day was also spoofed (as "Robin Yad") on The Goodies' episode "Saturday Night Grease". Day appeared as himself on an installment of the Morecambe and Wise show, in which he berates Ernie Wise in character. Then Eric Morecambe, acting as a TV presenter, says: "Sadly, we've come to the end of today's 'Friendly Discussion with Robin Day'."

Day was also frequently lampooned by the satirical TV programme Spitting Image. In this, he would frequently be shown interviewing then-prime minister Margaret Thatcher, who would always give answers somewhat unrelated to the question. The breathing difficulties that affected him later in life were represented: "My name is Robin (deep breath) Day."

His last regular TV work was Robin Day's Book Talk, which aired in the early days of BBC News 24 in around 1998. The programme featured interviews and discussions about books, broadly around a political theme. On occasions, it took the form of a one-on-one interview, while on other occasions it consisted of a panel discussion.

== Autobiographies ==
Day's two autobiographies were entitled Day by Day (1975) and Grand Inquisitor (1989).

== Death ==
Day died from heart complications, aged 76, on the evening of 6 August 2000, at the Wellington Hospital in London.

A funeral service was held at the chapel of Mortlake Crematorium, where his body was cremated. His ashes were buried in a grave near the south door of the Church of St Candida and Holy Cross, at Whitchurch Canonicorum in the county of Dorset. The grave's memorial stone bears the words: "In loving memory of Sir Robin Day – The Grand Inquisitor".

== Personal life ==
In 1965, Day married Katherine Ainslie, an Australian law don at St Anne's College, Oxford; the couple had two sons. The marriage was dissolved in 1986. Day's elder son suffered multiple skull fractures in a childhood fall, and never fully recovered.

In the 1980s, Day had a coronary bypass, and he suffered from breathing problems that were often evident when he was on the air. He had always fought against a tendency to put on weight. As an undergraduate, he had weighed 17 st 0 lb (108 kg; 238 lb), and he later claimed that, during the course of his life, he had succeeded in losing more weight than anyone else.

The broadcaster Joan Bakewell recalled that, while Day was professional when in the office, he was disrespectful towards female newsreaders: "Socially he was a menace. There was no subtlety in his manner: at office parties he would attack head on. 'Do the men you interview fancy you? Do they stare at your legs? Do they stare at your breasts? Do you sleep with many of them?' ... Whenever he loomed in sight, I made myself scarce."

== Publications ==
- Television: A Personal Report (1961)
- Day by Day: A Dose of My Own Hemlock (1975) (autobiography)
- The Media and Political Violence, by Richard Clutterbuck (1983; Day wrote the foreword)
- The Grand Inquisitor (1989) (autobiography)
- ... But with Respect (1993) (interview transcripts)
- Speaking for Myself (1999) (collection of speeches)

== In popular culture ==
Day is portrayed by Bertie Carvel in the episode "Marionettes" in season 2 of the Netflix series The Crown.

He was parodied in The Goodies episode "Saturday Night Grease" in 1980.

He was also parodied on the satirical puppet sketch show Spitting Image with a smug rictus grin and preposterously large bow tie.

He was referenced in Monty Python's Flying Circus in the "It's the Arts" sketch, where according to John Cleese, Day "had a hedgehog called Frank". The version of the sketch in the 1971 film adaption And Now for Something Completely Different changed Day to President Nixon.

Media offices
Preceded by David Jessel	Main presenter of The World at One; 1979–1987	Succeeded by James Naughtie
New programme	Regular Host of Question Time; 1979–1989	Succeeded by Peter Sissons
