= Big Foot (The Goodies) =

- The Goodies episode
- Episode no.: Series 9 Episode 4
- Original air date: 23 January 1982

Guest appearance
- Charlie Stafford as the Spider Man

Episode chronology
← Previous "Football Crazy"	Next → "Change of Life"

"Big Foot" is an episode of the British comedy television series The Goodies.

The episode is also known as "Bigfoot", "In Search of Bigfoot", "Arthur C. Clarke" and "In Search of Arthur C. Clarke".

This episode was made by LWT for ITV, and was written by Graeme Garden and Bill Oddie, with songs and music by Bill Oddie.

== Plot ==
Tim and Bill watch "Part 97" of their favourite show The Mysterious World Of Arthur C. Clarke. A voiceover then informs them that the show has been cancelled due to the non-existence of Arthur C. Clarke himself. Graeme is seen in the background hiding his disguise wig & glasses and nearly letting slip to the others that he is in fact Arthur C. Clarke, fired by LWT when his identity was discovered.

The gullible Tim and Bill embark on a trip to the North American Rockies in a quest to find their TV idol and discovered the same thing especially when notice Greame's wig slip out in the raw footage, after failing to distract his clueless friends and escaping his sham, Greame finally admitting the truth to Tim and Bill that he was just bringing a little excitement into people's lives by playing the character, dressing up like Bigfoot in a skin and throwing dishes in the air, making them think they sew flying saucers, "He can't help it if he accidentally made a couple of million quid on the side". Just before they're about to exposed Greame, The trio fearfully discover large footprints surrounding their cabin that they believe belong to the mysterious Bigfoot. However at night, Bill and Graeme later discover that the footprints were made by a sleepwalking Tim, earlier his dodgy foot swelling into an enormous size after walking and running around the steep hill sidings in the Rockies while wearing tight hiking boots and limping back and forth as he goes off chasing yetis and Arthur C. Clarke. Tim has becomes the laughing stock of the Rockies and flees into hiding with his enormous foolish-looking foot. Over time, Tim turns into a wild man, and becomes proud of his huge foot. Meanwhile Bill and Graeme hunt down the supposed Bigfoot, chasing Tim around from flat ground to the steep hill sidings until their own feet grow huge, and causing the wild Tim to laugh hysterically back at them.

== Cultural references ==
- Arthur C. Clarke
- Stonehenge
- Loch Ness Monster
- Bigfoot
- Yeti
- UFO
- Patterson–Gimlin film
- The Life and Times of Grizzly Adams
- Plesiosaur

== DVD and VHS releases ==
This episode has been released on both DVD and VHS.
