= Punky Business =

- The Goodies episode
- Episode no.: Series 7 Episode 4
- Directed by: Bob Spiers
- Original air date: 29 November 1977

Guest appearances
- Jane Asher as Caroline Kook; Frank Thornton as the Master of Ceremonies; Michael Barratt as himself; Patrick Moore as himself; Ronnie Brody; Roland MacLeod; Vicki Michelle as the Nurse; Selina Ingram; James Muir; Norman Bacon; Barney Carroll; Eddie Davis; Ernie Goodyear as a Policeman

Episode chronology
← Previous "Scoutrageous"	Next → "Royal Command"

"Punky Business" is an episode of the British comedy television series The Goodies. This episode is also known as "Punkerella" and as "Rock Goodies". Written by Graeme Garden and Bill Oddie with songs and music by Bill Oddie.

== Plot ==
The Goodies have become a rock band called "The Little Laddies", and sing 'Shiny Shoes' and 'on the road', where they are booed and ignored by the general public. However, they are picked up off the middle of the road by policemen, who put them to work. Soon tiring of performing for the police, the Goodies discover that and punk is the latest fad while the things that Tim bought up for the group's image like cleanies, good manners and ordinaries are out of date. Bill and Graeme decide to go punk — but Tim prefers to keep his neat and tidy image, including his shiny shoes.

A Punk news announcer says, "Right here's the *bleep* news. In the festival of Light Rally, Lord Longford made a *bleep* statement of the moral decline of this *honk honk* country. In support of this, Mary *honk* Whitehouse called for less *cuckoo* and *bleep*. What a pair of *pop*. Mr Tim Brooke *cuckoo* today stated a protest on behalf of the League of Shiny Shoe Wearers."

A punk interviewer ('Bill Grumpy') interviews Tim about his niceness, saying: "Mr Brooke-Taylor, let's face it, you are nice." to which Tim replied: "Yes." The punk interviewer then asked: "Would you be nice, here, now?" to which Tim replied: "Yes, I would." Surprised, the Punk interviewer asked: "You mean it honestly wouldn't bother you to be nice in front of millions of people?" to which Tim replied: "No." The punk interviewer then said: "Well, go ahead then." "Well," said Tim, "it's very, very, very kind of you to have invited me on the programme." The punk interviewer then said with heavy sarcasm: "Oh, very clever!" Tim said enthusiastically: "And I'd like to come on again, please." The punk interviewer, losing patience, says: "You sick little *bleep*!" and attacks Tim.

Tim takes the beautiful Caroline Kook out to dinner, but he can't understand what has happened to the restaurant — at lunchtime, that day, it had been an ordinary restaurant — now, at dinnertime, it had changed into a punk restaurant called "Trattoria Punk". He is so disgusted at what is offered on the restaurant's menu that he can't even say the names out loud (except for ratatouille, which the restaurateur (Graeme) says is off because they've run out of rats). Tim and Caroline finally chooses spaghetti, thinking that this would not be as bad as the rest. However Graeme makes the meal a messy and memorable one for Tim — memorable, that is, for all the wrong reasons.

Tim complains to Caroline Kook about the change to the restaurant, but she starts lecturing him about punk and her job. Caroline has been served with dignity by Graeme, instead of the rough-handed treatment with food which Graeme has meted out to Tim — so she lacks sympathy for what had happened to Tim. Caroline Kook mentions to Tim that there is to be a Trendsetters Ball. Graeme, who is listening to what she says, looks interested in what he is hearing.

People attending the ball try to outdo each other in punkiness, including Bill (who sings a punk song). Tim wants to go to the ball, but he is told that he looks too nice. Upset, Tim sweeps the Goodies office with a broom and asks a mouse for his opinion. The mouse's response upsets Tim even more and he loses his temper, saying, "You think I'm the ugliest person in the world? Cheeky, bloody mouse!"

Graeme arrives and turns Tim into Punkerella by operating on him. When Tim awakens, following the operation, he can't see where the change has been made — until Graeme tells Tim that he has taken Tim's leg off — following which Tim immediately falls over. Graeme warns Tim that the clip on his leg is not secure and should not be trusted to hold past midnight, so his leg might fall off. Graeme then puts a pumpkin, with rats and lizards hanging from it, over Tim's head, and Tim attends the ball.

In his disguise, Tim is an instant success. When he quickly leaves at midnight, during the ball, his amputated leg falls off and Tim leaves it behind on the stairs. And so the hunt is on to find the pumpkin-headed weirdo with one leg — with Caroline Kook vowing to marry him when he is found.

After a lengthy search, and after many imposters who deliberately sawed their legs off, the Coroner arrives at the Goodies place. Graeme is about to reveal the owner of the leg in Tim's favour when Bill bursts in dressed as a one-legged pirate who claims the leg is his. After a pathetic attempt to get the leg on him (and his Parrot), Bill grudgingly calls in Tim to try the leg on. To Bill's amazement, as he had no knowledge Tim's leg was missing, it fits.

As promised, Tim wins the hand of Caroline Kook (the left hand and arm to be exact). Graeme wins the top half and the right hand whilst the lower half goes to Bill. And so the Little Laddies live happily ever after.

== Cultural references ==
- Punk subculture
- Cinderella
- Caroline Coon — a British artist and journalist who became involved with the punk scene.
- Rock Follies — a TV show about a fictional female rock band called the "Little Ladies", which the Goodies parody by calling themselves the "Little Laddies"
- Bill Grundy — the television presenter who goaded the Sex Pistols into swearing on television in the early evening, effectively ending his tenure with the show and, subsequently, ending the show itself.

== DVD and VHS releases ==
This episode has been released on DVD.
