= Animals (The Goodies) =

- The Goodies episode
- Episode no.: Series 8 Episode 5
- Original air date: 11 February 1980

Guest appearances
- Mel Smith as Reginald Bowes and Cat; Patrick Moore as himself; Ronnie Storm; Ernie Goodyear

Episode chronology
← Previous "U-Friend or UFO?"	Next → "War Babies"

"Animals" is an episode of the British comedy television series The Goodies. This episode is also known as "Animal Liberation" and "Animal Lib" and also "Watership Down".

It was written by Graeme Garden and Bill Oddie with songs and music by Bill Oddie.

== Plot ==
Tim has been collecting various animals to take part in showbiz. However, his agency is not a commercial success due to his feeble kindness and pathetic ways of training animals; even Bill is crazed with hunger for meat. He has not eaten anything while feeding the animals, as Tim neglected him by forcing Bill to do all the work for him. Graeme arrives to collect lions for the circus, but Tim has no big cats or bears for cruel taming. Tim attempts to prove that kindness is the best method to train animals with (after Graeme has also sneered "You couldn't teach a cow to eat grass!") from a tap dancing dog to a small budgie riding on a big bicycle in the office, which does not impress Greame; then he tries to get everyone's attention on the street with a dog and a street organ, but they take no notice of them. Greame rightfully points out to Tim that his "soppy approach to training animals is simply not a commercial proposition." So, Tim gives up trying to get the animals into the act, but he discovers that Bill and Graeme came up other ideas and put the animals to work in energy-saving domestic duties. Tim is horrified at what they have done, so he decides to support an "Animal Discrimination Act": Animals are granted equal rights with humans and it is now illegal for humans to exploit animals.

This includes a ban on eating animals, which enrages carnivorous Bill, who decides to "speak out" for vegetables in the "Rabid Frost Programme", where he ends up eating the leader of the Animal Revolutionary Party and making animals angry for seeing the true meaning of human nature. In the end, the humans have to disguise themselves as rabbits to escape from the fury of the animals.

== Cultural references ==
- David Attenborough
- David Bellamy
- David Frost
- Reginald Bosanquet
- News at Ten
- Not the Nine O'Clock News
- Watership Down
