= Snow White 2 =

- The Goodies episode
- Episode no.: Series 9 Episode 1
- Original air date: 27 December 1981

Guest appearances
- David Rappaport as the Chief Dwarf; Richard Briers as the Narrator; Annette Lyons as Snow White; Syd Wright as the Xylophone Player

Episode chronology
← Previous "War Babies"	Next → "Robot"

"Snow White 2" is a special episode of the British comedy television series The Goodies.

This episode is also known as "Pantomime" and "Snow White and the Seven Dwarfs".

This episode was made by LWT for ITV.

Written by Graeme Garden and Bill Oddie, with songs and music by Bill Oddie and Dave McRae.

== Plot ==
Just when you thought it was safe to go back to the pantomime ....

The Goodies live next door to Snow White and the Seven Dwarfs.

When Snow White runs away with a handsome prince, she arranges for the dwarfs to be garden gnomes. When only four of the seven dwarfs are left, they advertise for three other dwarfs to join them. Tim, Graeme and Bill pretend to be dwarfs and join, but they are unable to go through the front door of the dwarf's home without bumping their heads. Tim and Graeme then confess to Chief Dwarf that they are not dwarfs — while Bill comments: "I nearly am!" The Goodies are forced to leave the group because they are too tall.

The Goodies, who are then out of work, leave home. They get hopelessly lost in a forest and are kidnapped by some ladies. Taken to a large palace, they have to wait on the princes and princesses (including Snow White, Cinderella and Sleeping Beauty), following which they are thrown on the scrapheap with Buttons, the ugly sisters and other pantomime characters played by men. The Goodies rebel against their position and are able to win out against the odds.

== Cultural references ==
- Pantomimes
- Snow White and the Seven Dwarfs
- Cinderella
- Sleeping Beauty
- "Jaws"
- "Jaws 2"
- "Star Wars"

== Guest stars ==
The Seven Dwarfs

- David Rappaport
- Kenny Baker - R2D2 in Star Wars
- Peter Burroughs
- George Claydon
- Mike Cottrel
- Malcolm Dixon
- Mike Edmonds
- Tony Friel
- John Ghavan
- Rusty Goffe
- Gerald Stadden

Princesses / Princes

- Jacki Barron
- Caroline Dillon
- Jane Faith
- Carol Forbes
- Jackie Hall
- Nola Haynes
- Chrissie Kendall
- Chrissie Monk
- Wanda Rokicki
- Jane Winchester

== DVD and VHS releases ==
This episode has been released on DVD.
