= U-Friend or UFO? =

- The Goodies episode
- Episode no.: Series 8 Episode 4
- Original air date: 4 February 1980

Guest appearances
- Patrick Moore as himself the Astronomer; Roger Brierley as the Park Attendant; Marcelle Sammett; Ernie Goodyear; Richard Smith; R2-D2 (Kenny Baker) (uncredited) as ("EB-GB")

Episode chronology
← Previous "A Kick in the Arts"	Next → "Animals"

"U-Friend or UFO?" is an episode of the British comedy television series The Goodies.

This episode is also known as "Close Encounters".

Written by Graeme Garden and Bill Oddie , with songs and music by Bill Oddie.

== Plot ==
The Goodies open a restaurant called "Knutters Knoll Knite Spot", on the top of Knutters Knoll. To help with the housework, including washing up, Graeme has built a robot he calls EB-GB (Electronic Brain of Great Britain). Graeme asks: "EB-GB, how do you speak to aliens?" to which EB-GB replies in a Dalek voice: "Exterminate!"

Away from the restaurant, Bill is watching when musicians suddenly and unexpectedly disappear during performances. Graeme tries to determine a common link between the series of recent disappearances, even writing up all the information that he has about the missing persons on the blackboard. Graeme has no idea what could be the common link, and it takes Bill to point out that all the missing persons are trombone players.

In contemplation of this fact, Bill plays the trombone in the park to see if he can find the answer to the riddle and also get taken, but nothing happens to him. Bill rushes back to the restaurant when he sees a weird noisy light approaching, but the weird light turns out to be Graeme who is out doing some UFO spotting with an electronic gadget box. Graeme explains his UFO spotter gadget box to Tim, and they do not notice when Bill and his trombone are kidnapped — Bill is later sent back with a mangled trombone and the word "REJECT" stamped on his forehead.

Later, Graeme becomes aware that there is a moving blip on the television screen, which seems to be attuned to his every thought. Graeme sets about devising an ingenious plot, which includes some "Supermen" and a "Supernun", to get rid of the rapidly approaching spacecraft before it can reach Earth.

Later, when things are beginning to improve, Graeme's device comes back to haunt him — and everyone else. Graeme comments: "That was a five megaton Nun, son ...... I didn't know the Nun was loaded. Boom! Boom!"

== Cultural references ==
- Close Encounters of the Third Kind
- Star Wars — (R2-D2 as "EB-GB")
- Doctor Who — (EB-GB's comment "Exterminate!")
- Monty Python's Flying Circus — ("Liberty Bell March")
- The Music Man — ("Seventy-Six Trombones")
- Superman
- The Flying Nun
- ‘’Basil Brush’’
- ‘’Coronation Street’’
