= The Goodies Rule – O.K.? =

- The Goodies episode
- Episode no.: Series 5 Episode 14
- Directed by: Jim Franklin
- Original air date: 21 December 1975

Guest appearances
- Michael Barratt as himself (the Interviewer); Tony Blackburn as himself; Sue Lawley as herself; Patrick Moore as himself; Eddie Waring as himself; Terry Wogan as himself; Corbet Woodall as himself (the Newsreader); Norman Mitchell as the Town Crier; Ronald Russell; Roland MacLeod as Robert McKenzie; Barry Cryer voice only; Sheila Steafel as the Queen (voice); Jim Styles; Kenny Everett as Candidate (uncredited)

Episode chronology
← Previous "The End"	Next → "Lips, or Almighty Cod"

"The Goodies Rule – O.K.?" is a special episode of the British comedy television series The Goodies.

As always, it was written by the Goodies, with songs and music by Bill Oddie. The costume designer for this episode was Dee Robson.

== Plot ==
It is the early '60s and the Goodies are trying to make it big as pop stars. However, at every turn, their ideas are ripped off by acts who then go on to be much more successful than the Cricklewood trio—the Beatles, the Supremes and the Bachelors. Now in the mid-'70s the Goodies are despondent and living on Skid Row, they decide to get their own back by stealing the most famous characteristics of some of the most successful artists around—Elton John's glasses, the Bay City Rollers' trousers, Donny Osmond's teeth, etc.

They are so successful, the top 10 is packed wall to wall with Goodies singles. The trio play Wembley Stadium, although to avoid crowd trouble, the audience is made up entirely of police. Having saved the pop business single-handedly, the Goodies are awarded OBEs at a spectacularly waterlogged royal garden party. To distract the nation from the appalling state of the economy, the Goodies are employed to cheer up the nation and they oblige with an irritating song and dance craze called "The Bounce", which then causes everything in the country, from people to machinery, to start bouncing.

With the nation in chaos, a general election is called (featuring comedian Kenny Everett in a cameo as one of the candidates), but is won by a party advocating no enjoyment whatsoever, populated by shop window dummies. With entertainment now illegal, the Goodies become Robin Hood-style outlaws, travelling the nation giving impromptu variety shows and hanging out in "jokeeasies" where they plot to overthrow the government. However, it is not that easy—the entertainers have been banned for so long that they cannot remember their old routines. Finally, the Goodies manage to oust the dummies and the entertainers take power—but with their memories gone, Bill suggests another option—a puppet government.

Taking this literally, popular puppets Sooty and Sweep are now the Prime Minister and the Home Secretary, and the Houses of Parliament are now full of screeching hand puppets. With their government at risk from these stuffed pretenders, the Goodies sneak into the Prime Minister's residence, Chequers, to remonstrate with the puppets. However they are immediately attacked and pursued by various giant versions of famous puppets from television in the '50s, '60s and '70s. They are threatened by a 6-foot-tall (1.8 m) Andy Pandy, Teddy and Looby Loo; Tim eats up a hybrid of Oscar the Grouch, Ernie, and the Cookie Monster (from American TV series, Sesame Street); he and Graeme are challenged to a sword fight by Bill and Ben, the Flower Pot Men; and Bill is roughly beaten up by The Wombles (a sly nod to the chart rivalry between the Goodies and Mike Batt's Wombles singles).

Having vanquished their foes, the Goodies relax...but charging up behind them is a 20-foot-long (6.1 m) Dougal, the dog from The Magic Roundabout. As Graeme tries to ride the mighty "beast" and Tim is run over by the thing, Bill grapples with an enormous Zebedee, from the same programme. The trio guide Dougal and Zebedee back to the country house, where they comprehensively destroy the building and the puppet government.

Having hidden down a handy manhole, the Goodies return following this coup to their woodland retreat and look on as the Conservative, Labour and Liberal parties agree to form a coalition government. All seems well until the camera pulls back and reveals that Margaret Thatcher, Harold Wilson and Jeremy Thorpe are actually puppets being worked by...the Goodies. They smirk knowingly.

However, the last laugh is on the trio—and we see Bill, Graeme and Tim being worked by strings held by director Jim Franklin.

== Cultural references ==
Celebrities and famous people	Politics, shows and events	Puppets
The Beatles	Pathe Newsreel	Hector, Kiki the frog, and Zsazsa the cat from 1960s puppet series, Hector's House (Hector was the first puppet to attack the Goodies)
The Supremes	Top of the Pops	Sooty and Sweep, Soo the Panda and Kipper the Cat from The Sooty Show (ITV aired it in 1975, which at the time was made by Thames Television.)
The Bachelors	It Ain't Half Hot Mum	Dougal and Zebedee from The Magic Roundabout
Cliff Richard	The Untouchables spoofed as "The Unmentionables"	Bill and Ben, Little Weed from Flower Pot Men
Cilla Black	Saint Valentine's Day massacre	Punch and Judy
Pete Murray	Speakeasys spoofed as Joke-easys	Paddington Bear (prior to the BBC series)
Yehudi Menuhin	Prohibition	Pussycat Willum from Small Time, made by now-defunct Associated Redifussion for ITV
Andrés Segovia	Keep Britain Tidy spoofed as 'Keep Britain Gloomy'	Basil Brush
Duane Eddy	Witchfinder General; Matthew Hopkins spoofed as 'The Mirthfinders'	Rupert Bear and Bill Badger
Ravi Shanker	Nationwide	'The Furry White Woofumpuss' from Vision On
Joe "Mr Piano" Henderson	Election Special and Robert McKenzie	Ernie, Oscar the Grouch, and Cookie Monster from the American series Sesame Street (hybrid seen in bin, attacking Tim)
Elton John	Come Dancing	Pinky and Perky two puppet pigs from the 1960s, who sound the alarm
The Rubettes	Conservative Party	Andy Pandy, Teddy and Looby Loo from the 1950s/60s television series Andy Pandy
Alvin Stardust	Labour Party	Big Ears from The Adventures of Noddy, a 1955 ITV television series
Bay City Rollers	Liberal Party	Clangers (a Clanger is seen speaking in the Houses of Parliament)
Donny Osmond	Prime Minister	The Wombles
Lynsey De Paul	Chancellor of the Exchequer	
Telly Savalas	Kojak	
Gary Glitter	Town crier	
Roy Wood	Wizzard	
Max Wall	Frank Spencer from Some Mothers Do 'Ave 'Em	
Michael Barratt	Robin Hood	
Patrick Moore	Music to Midnight, a BBC Radio 2 late-night music show from 1972	
Terry Wogan		
Eddie Waring		
Tommy Cooper		
Ken Dodd		
Tony Blackburn		
Rolf Harris		
Alan Whicker		
Eric Morecambe and Ernie Wise		
Jimmy Savile		
Val Doonican		
Harry Secombe		
Jeremy Thorpe		
John Peel spoofed as "Sir John Peel of the Funky Gibbon Party"		
Harold Wilson		
Margaret Thatcher		
Sue Lawley		

== Notes ==
- The segment with the 20-foot-long (6.1 m) Dougal, from The Magic Roundabout, was filmed at Parnham House, Dorset, the filming location of Chequers.
- This is the last regular episode to have specially written songs by Oddie. The following BBC episodes onwards would use incidental music for filmed sequences. The concept would not return until series 9 when the cast joined ITV Television.

== DVD and VHS releases ==
This episode has been released on DVD.
