= Bunfight at the O.K. Tea Rooms =

- The Goodies episode
- Episode no.: Series 5 Episode 12
- Original air date: 28 April 1975

Episode chronology
← Previous "South Africa"	Next → "The End"

"Bunfight at the O.K. Tea Rooms" is an episode of the British comedy television series The Goodies.

This episode is also known as "Cream Cave" and as "Cream Rush Fever".

Written by The Goodies, with songs and music by Bill Oddie.

== Plot ==
The Goodies head west (to Cornwall) to search for gold because they were broke. Surprisingly it was all due to Graeme who has squandered their money on all sorts of camping and mining equipment including a stubborn mule that will not move. One morning, Graeme arriving from the dig, comments: "You'll never guess what I've just found in an old tin mine." Tim asks: "Gold?!" to which Graeme replies: "No, old tins ... and this!" Tim, curious, asks: "What?" and Graeme answers: "Gold ore!" Tim asks: "Ore?", to which Graeme replies: "Or something else!" In which it came to their surprise that the ore rock turned out to be made of pure Cornish cream.

Graeme takes things easy, while getting Tim and Bill to do all the work. When Bill complains, saying: "Now listen, we've been doing all the hard work, and you've just been sitting around all day!" Graeme says soothingly: "Lads, lads... somebody has to sit around all day."

The Goodies strike cream in an old mine – and Graeme files the claim for the cream in his own name, forsaking the other two, who are about to leave Cornwall broke and dejected. But Tim and Bill's then strike Strawberry Jam and Scones and got surprisingly lucky. When Graeme finds out, he offers them a poker game at his pub called OK Tea Rooms, winner-takes-all, using pieces of toast rather than cards, and stakes taking the form of biscuits and later layered cakes (it is revealed that Graeme is cheating – he is using a toaster to pop slices of toast up into his hand).

Things reach a climax in a western-style shoot-out, but with tomato sauce rather than guns – and "The Ballad of the OK Tea Rooms" can then be heard: "For if you double-cross a friend, you'll get squirted in the end".

== Cultural references ==
- Cornwall
- Gold Rush
- Revisionist Western
- Gunfight at the O.K. Corral
- Sam Peckinpah films (the final shootout using Ketchup squirters for blood)

== DVD and VHS releases ==
This episode has been released on both DVD and VHS.
