= Robot (The Goodies) =

- The Goodies episode
- Episode no.: Series 9 Episode 2
- Original air date: 9 January 1982

Guest appearance
- David Rappaport as the voice of the Robot

Episode chronology
← Previous "Snow White 2"	Next → "Football Crazy"

"Robot" is an episode of the British comedy television series The Goodies.

This episode is also known as "Automation".

This episode was made by LWT for ITV.

Written by Graeme Garden and Bill Oddie, with songs and music by Bill Oddie.

== Plot ==
Tim and Graeme are studying a readout of their end of year profits and expenses, and deduce that they must fire Bill in order to keep the business running at a profit. Graeme suggests that they introduce automation now that Bill is gone, while Bill announces that he's going to picket. Unfortunately, the lettering on his picket sign, which reads "Support your striking mate!" starts to run after it starts raining, leading the sign to now read "up yours mate!", which causes Bill to get knocked out by an offended passerby.

Back at the Goodies office, Bill is packing up his things, while Tim nervously paces around the living room. Bill says it must be because of the guilt they are feeling for firing him, but Tim explains that they are expecting a little visitor and will soon be hearing the patter of tiny feet. Suddenly, they hear the sound of a baby crying and Graeme bursts in and announces that they are now the proud parents of a baby robot. Bill is aghast at being replaced with such a thing, but Graeme explains that when it grows up it will be able to do everything that he does. Convinced that Tim and Graeme has lost their minds, Bill exits.

Later that night, reluctant Tim and frustrated Graeme are woken up by the wailing of the robot. They get into an argument over who should get up to look after it and decide that they need an Au pair to look after the robot. The next morning, a group of attractive would-be Au pairs arrive at the house, and a randy Tim is suddenly excited about the prospect of getting some hired help. However, one final applicant arrives - a still bearded Bill, in a pink sweater, mini-skirt, blonde wig and with an outrageously large bust, wanders in and introduces himself as Helga from Sweden. Tim is disgusted by "Helga", but Graeme insists they hire her, citing a well-known rule of life about never to hire a pretty Au pair as it always causes trouble. Tim and Graeme explain to "Helga" what is expected of "her" and suggest "she" take the robot out for a walk.

"Helga" immediately tries to do away with the defenceless robot while out on their walk - using a variety of methods to dispose of it. None of these work and the robot turns the tables on his carer and eventually gets "Helga" encased in a concrete block. Fed up, "Helga" dumps the robot at the steps of a homeless shelter and runs away.

Later, Tim spanks "Helga" as punishment for losing the robot when they go on walks. Graeme enters and tells off "Helga". Tim and Graeme demand an explanation from "Helga" as to why the robot keeps going missing 25 times in the last two weeks. Bill, who's now dropped the accent and speaks in his normal voice, comments that the robot is growing up and they can't rule his life. A nostalgic Graeme goes to his computer to play their home movies featuring his baby robot. These movies include such moments of Graeme shoving dozens of ice creams into the mouth of the robot and "Helga" subsequently being vomited on by the robot. The film ends with secret video that Graeme recorded of "Helga" dumping the robot at the shelter.

Graeme then proudly announces that "Helga's" efforts to get rid of the robot were useless, as it is always programmed to come home. Bill inquires where the robot is now, and Graeme admits that he has no idea. Tim and Graeme then get into a debate over the gender of their cybernetic offspring when their "son" rather a daughter bursts in (now much larger than the last time he appeared) accompanied by a pink female robot (which Graeme refers to as a "tin trollop). Tim demands that the robot get up to his room immediately, to which the robot replies "You said it, baldy". The sounds of them engaging in hanky panky are heard as Graeme and Tim lament over where they went wrong as parents.

Helga chides the duo for having "got rid of that nice furry little bloke Bill"; for the robot who's "suppose to work here" and is "ruining your life … and your ceiling!" (as he bangs and clunks around upstairs with his girlfriend), even spoil him and farm him out to a nervous little Swedish kid like Helga while the two never put any real time into their son and wonder why he turned into a hooligan, And so Graeme's bid to put a stop to the robot's antics with "a jolly good talking-to!" with Helga's suggestion of setting up a good example. The robot comes back down and Tim feebly tries to lay down the law. The robot treats Tim's dressing down with contempt, his interest only raising when Graeme walks in dressed up in kitchen utensils and cooking pans pretending to be a robot, in order to set up a good example for his son. But this backfires when the robot becomes amorous with Graeme due to his fambot like appearance and advances on him. Tim admits that their son is beyond saving, saying he's only interested in sex and playing loud music. Tim then makes an offhand comment about how "next thing you know, he'll probably grow long hair and a beard", and almost instantly, a beard and Oddie-esque long hair appears on the robot. Graeme is aghast, declaring that they've turned the robot into Bill and talk about how much they loathed him. "Helga" wanders in and jumps to Bill's defence - saying he thought Bill was a fine human being. "Obviously you didn't know him" Graeme responds. Bill replies "Know him? ... I am him!", taking off his Helga wig. Tim and Graeme then realise they want him back, saying they don't need a robot. The robot then warns them to be careful, to which Bill launches into an agitated rant about how robots are taking over. He mentions C-3PO, K-9, R2-D2, Twiki and Metal Mickey as he launches into an impassioned speech about the greatness of the human race. Graeme is worried about agitating the robot, and sure enough, he responds by storming out of the Goodies' apartment, leading his "comrades" - i.e. the kitchen appliances (oven, fridge) out of the home in protest. Tim vainly asks them to "Come back", but they leave.

To the strains of Bill's song "Come Back", the Goodies set off in pursuit of their whitegoods and the robot, with the help of a giant magnet. Eventually, it's left to Tim to defeat the angry appliances, and after being cornered and advanced upon by the robot and his allies, he uses the giant magnet to lift himself up to a lightpost, thereby causing the robot and the appliances to crash into each other and explode.

Tim then returns to the Goodies' home saying that the robot has learnt his lesson, to which a barely recognisable, severely damaged robot appears and says "Sorry, mummy". Graeme says that he doesn't need the robot anymore, as Bill is doing all of the housework now. Tim follows Graeme into the kitchen, where he sees Bill sitting at the table. With robotic movements, Bill puts his hand into a bowl of mixture and mixes it at high speed. Tim says that there is only one of him - to which Graeme responds that he's mass-produced Bill. He then leads Tim into the living room, where a room full of "Bill clones" are performing a variety of household chores (e.g. one acts as a TV set, another acts as an oven, another is doing the washing).

== Notes ==
Bill Oddie refers to Metal Mickey, a robot which originally appeared on the children's television show Saturday Banana hosted by Oddie.

== DVD and VHS releases ==
This episode has been released on both DVD and VHS.
