= Scoutrageous =

- The Goodies episode
- Episode no.: Series 7 Episode 3
- Directed by: Bob Spiers
- Original air date: 22 November 1977

Guest appearances
- Frank Windsor as Scoutfinder General; Michael Barratt; Iris Jones; Peggy Mason; Pat Montrose; Norman Bacon; Ernie Goodyear; James Muir

Episode chronology
← Previous "Dodonuts"	Next → "Punky Business"

"Scoutrageous" is an episode of the British comedy television series The Goodies.

This episode is also known as "Scouting Adventures" and "Boy Scouts".

Written by Graeme Garden and Bill Oddie and music by Bill Oddie.

== Plot ==
Graeme and Bill are curious — Tim has been acting in a suspicious manner as he goes out every Thursday for sixteen years. They decide to follow Tim, and find that he is a scout, with the name "Brown Owl". Bill and Graeme are jealous of him, especially the badges he and his fellow scouts earned — they want to be scouts, too. So Tim allows them to join — however, their behaviour is so bad because of their merely boyish planks and making custom badges that they are quickly drummed out of the Scouts by Tim.

On the outer, Graeme and Bill become bad masked scouts (the "Lone Scout, plus One"), who create havoc with their own special brand of 'Bob A Job', where they demand money, or they will do a job (they demand £500 from Tim, and then £1000 from other people). They also cause problems for people as they work towards getting their 'Wig-spotters Badge' and 'World Domination Badge'. Graeme comments to Bill that there are only three people who had ever received the "World Domination Badge" — Alexander the Great, Julius Caesar and David Frost (although Graeme says Frost had actually pinched his badge). The actions of Bill and Graeme result in the Scouts becoming an illegal organisation, and Tim and the other scouts are forced to hide their scouting membership from the Scoutfinder General.

The Scoutfinder General decides to trick Tim into revealing that he is a scout, by saying: "Dyb, Dyb, Dyb" with Tim then joining in with: "Dob, D-shhhhhhhhhh!" The Scoutfinder General asked sharply: "WHAT WAS THAT?!" to which Tim replied nervously: "N-nothing."

Accusingly, the Scoutfinder General said: "You said dob!" to which Tim replied, speaking very quickly: "only one though, one dob, not three dobs." Tim continues to deny that he is a scout, so the Scoutfinder General drums his fingers on his desk, and Tim and his scout group cannot help themselves — they burst into a scouting song ("On The Crest Of A Wave"). The Scoutfinder General looks smug and triumphant at his success, and Tim and his scout group are then convicted of being scouts.

Deprived of the scouts, Tim joins the Salvation Army (in which he is the only man — appearing as both a Sergeant and Field Marshal). Tim battles the mysterious masked bad scouts with the help of his all-women troops from the Salvation Army, as well as the all-women troops from the Salvation Navy and the all-women troops from the Salvation Air force. They eventually cornered and surrounded the masked criminals, But, The Lone Scout ditch one last attempt to avoid getting arrested by using his home-made atom bomb to take them all with the bad masked scouts. However, the bomb meekly fizzles out, So the duo had no choice but to surrender to Tim and remove their disguises. Tim is rather shocked when he sees that it is his fellow Goodies hiding underneath the masks and big hats, Graeme starts to nod to indicate his guilt. However Bill (with a charming mixture of defiance and innocence) utters "No!" and Tim naively believes him and drives away with his troops (merrily singing "Come and join us …") before he eventually realises that he has been a bit too charitable.

== Cultural references ==
The character "Scout Finder General" is loosely based on the "Kessler" character from the BBC drama series The Secret Army.

- Scout Movement
- McCarthyism and witch hunts in general
- Salvation Army
- Gang Show (when Tim and his Scout group sing "On The Crest of A Wave")
- Alexander the Great
- Julius Caesar
- David Frost

== DVD and VHS releases ==
This episode has been released on both DVD and VHS.
