= Kitten Kong =

- The Goodies episode
- Episode no.: Series 2 Episode 7
- Directed by: Jim Franklin
- Original air date: 12 November 1971

Guest appearances
- Michael Aspel as himself; Corbet Woodall as himself; Milton Reid as Bodyguard

Episode chronology
← Previous "Culture for the Masses"	Next → "Come Dancing"

"Kitten Kong" is an episode of the British comedy television series The Goodies, written by The Goodies, with songs and music by Bill Oddie.

== Plot ==
Bill is cooking when Graeme and Tim return from chess championships. Graeme and Tim are hungry and want their dinner — however, there is only soggy lettuce and potato peel to eat because Bill has fed their normal food (and wine) to "Bunter", a guinea pig, with dessert to follow.

When Bill explains to Tim and Graeme that he is being paid £30 to look after the guinea pig, the thought of being able to get some extra money leads to the Goodies setting up the office as the "Goodies Animal Clinic" for "loony animals". Graeme sends Tim and Bill out to collect them from their owners. The Goodies' animal "patients" include a gigantic-sized snake, a gold fish, a hen (which escapes from the basket en route to the office), a large dog, a bushbaby, a tortoise, a mongoose, a vampire bat, two singing dogs, and a tiny fluffy white kitten called "Twinkle".

Graeme's specially formulated growth mixture, which he feeds to the kitten, causes Twinkle to grow to super-size proportions, which horrifies Tim. Graeme keeps Twinkle inside to stop him from wandering, but Bill foolishly decides to puts Twinkle out for the night. Graeme says desperately, "Come on. We've got to find him and catch him before he eats someone he shouldn't." Tim suggests, "You mean something he shouldn't?", to which Graeme replies, "I know what I mean!"

The following two days, Twinkle destroys St Paul's Cathedral and the Post Office Tower, as well as squashing Michael Aspel with his huge paw, and frightening various people and dogs.

Graeme makes an antidote to counteract the disastrous effect of his growth mixture and reduce Twinkle back to the normal size of a cat, but the Goodies have to disguise themselves as giant mice to use themselves as bait, and become airborne on their trandem, to be able to get close enough to Twinkle for the antidote to be successful — following which their "hot-air trandem balloon" is carried away by a Concorde airliner.

Twinkle returns to normal size, and all seems well. However, the Goodies then discover that there is yet another unexpected and unforeseen consequence resulting from Graeme's growth mixture — they now have a bunch of king-size mice problem on their hands.

== Award ==
A special episode, which was based on this episode, was called "Kitten Kong: Montreux '72 Edition", and was first broadcast in 1972. It won the Silver Rose at the 1972 Rose d'Or Festival, held in Montreux, Switzerland. In the first episode of the next season, The New Office, Tim Brooke-Taylor is seen painting the trophy gold.

== Nomination ==
"Kitten Kong" was the first Goodies episode to be nominated for a BAFTA award for Best Light Entertainment Programme.

== Cultural references ==
- King Kong
- Annie Get Your Gun (with the song "Anything You Can Do")
- Tom and Jerry

== Notes ==
Although Concorde had its first flight in 1969, it did not go into service until 1976.

The original 25 minute episode is thought to no longer exist, making it the only Goodies episode which is officially lost; however, the expanded and more elaborate version for the 1972 Montreux festival is said to have only minor differences from its 1971 prototype. One difference is the ending; in the original the giant mice are represented by stock footage of real mice inserted into the footage using chroma-key (CSO). In the Montreux version, giant model mouse heads are seen crashing through polystyrene walls.

Graeme Garden makes a reference to the episode during "Earthanasia" while talking about animal science.

The image of the kitten climbing the Post Office Tower (shown above) became a signature image for The Goodies. It was included in the title sequence of all their subsequent series made by the BBC.

== DVD and VHS releases ==
The "Kitten Kong (Montreux special)" episode has been released on both DVD and VHS.
