= Animals Are People Too =

- The Goodies episode
- Episode no.: Series 9 Episode 7
- Original air date: 13 February 1982

Guest appearances
- Sadie Eddon; Sue Crossland; Ken Barker; Stuart Fell

Episode chronology
← Previous "Holiday"	Next → —

"Animals Are People Too" is the last episode of the British comedy television series The Goodies. This episode, which was made by LWT for ITV, was written by Graeme Garden and Bill Oddie, with songs and music by Bill Oddie. It marked the last regular on-screen appearance of Tim Brooke-Taylor, Graeme Garden and Bill Oddie.

== Plot ==
Tim has bought a dog from Graeme, but the dog does not obey Tim's orders. In the end, Tim returns the dog to Graeme, who then sells him a 'new model dog' (Bill).

== Cultural references ==
- Barbara Woodhouse
- ITN News at Ten

== Home media ==
This episode has been released on DVD.
