= Rome Antics =

- The Goodies episode
- Episode no.: Series 5 Episode 9
- Original air date: 7 April 1975

Guest appearances
- Roy Kinnear as Roman Emperor; Oliver Gilbert as Attila the Hun

Episode chronology
← Previous "Lighthouse Keeping Loonies"	Next → "Fleet Street Goodies"

"Rome Antics" is a 1975 episode of the British comedy television series The Goodies.

It was written by The Goodies, with songs and music by Bill Oddie.

== Plot ==
In Queen Boadicea's Britain, the Ancient Goodies wear animal skins and Graeme's spectacle frames are made from wooden twigs. They live in a small, dark, one-room stone house. Graeme creates a hole with a club to allow more light.

The Romans are gradually taking over Britain. Tim says that the Romans' woad is better quality than the British woad is. Graeme and Bill are appalled.

The Goodies hide from a Roman “ambassador”, actually a messenger sent by the Emperor. The Emperor summons the Goodies to Rome. The Goodies come to a crossroad where their path diverges into three, each marked with a signpost labelled “Rome”. Unable to agree on one path, each Goodie takes a different path but all three arrive at the destination simultaneously.

The Emperor tells the Goodies that he wants them to provide entertainment for the masses. The Emperor’s concept of entertainment entirely consists of market gardening exhibitions, which have proved unpopular. The Goodies provide an evening of elaborate and silly entertainment at the arena, but the po-faced Romans are not amused. The Emperor speaks to the audience from a balcony, but the subjects throw fruit and vegetables at him.

The Emperor was disappointed with their efforts, especially since they didn't have the Christians, Gladiators and Lions in the Coliseum due to the fact that the Christians "got fed up throw in to the Lions and got much better as fruitgrowers, thanks to the Emperor" However, they also ate Lions "because they're sick of the sight of fruit." while the Gladiators got eaten by the lions "who were hungry because there were no Christians." So The Trio had to replace the Lions with sheep. The Emperor later complains about his life. Tim says that he would like to be Emperor, so the Emperor abdicates the role to Tim. Tim creates vacation areas all over Rome and invites people from all over the known world. Graeme arranges the entertainment.

The army of the Barbarians, Goths and Visigoths and Vandals have received the Goodies' invitations and leave a wake of destruction on their way to Rome. They are all led by Attila the Hun, thanks to Graeme's foolish mistake.

The Goodies planned entertainment at the Colosseum entails a ring tossing exhibition during which they accidentally create the Olympic Rings logo. When the Vandals arrive, the Goodies flee the area. Tim leads the escape with a lit torch that sets fire to laundry hanging from clotheslines, causing the Great Fire of Rome. Tim finds a violin in a glass case labelled "Break glass in case of fire". He removes the violin and plays it, while Rome burns in the background.

== Cultural references ==
- Attila the Hun — who was the most powerful of the kings of Huns
- Nero
- Colosseum
- Olympic rings
- Olympic torch
- Venus de Milo
- European Economic Community (EEC)
- 1970s Energy Crisis
