= Scatty Safari =

- The Goodies episode
- Episode no.: Series 5 Episode 6
- Original air date: 17 March 1975

Guest appearances
- Tony Blackburn as himself; Sheila Steafel as the Queen (voice); David Willmott as Rolf Harris; Rusty Goffe as Little Rolf Harris (uncredited)

Episode chronology
| ← Previous "Frankenfido" | Next → "Kung Fu Kapers" |

"Scatty Safari" is an episode of the British comedy television series The Goodies. It was written by The Goodies, with songs and music by Bill Oddie.

This episode is also known as "The Existence of Rolf Harris" and "Pied Piper Goodies versus the Rolf Harris Plague".

== Plot ==
When they lose their main attraction, Tony Blackburn, the Goodies have to come up with another star attraction to replace him in "The Goodies *Star* Safari Park". After considering and rejecting other big-time show names, they eventually decide on Rolf Harris, with Bill, reading the "Observers Book of Stars", "Rolf Harris — number of legs, variable" (a reference to Harris' song Jake the Peg). According to the book, Rolf Harris is an all-round entertainer whose natural habitat is Australia.

The Goodies' arrival in Australia is marked by photos of the Sydney Opera House and the Sydney Harbour Bridge — also seen are a kangaroo, koalas and kookaburras. The Goodies go into the "Pom's Outfitters" shop and reappear with cork hats — Bill's hat still has the bottles attached to the corks. Noticing headlines in a newspaper stating that Rolf Harris had been seen in the Outback, the Goodies go there in search of their quarry (to the strains of "Waltzing Matilda").

When they get Rolf Harris back to their safari park in England, he is unhappy. Graeme comments that there used to be thousands of Rolf Harrises all over Australia, but that there were probably only a half dozen left now – "it was the beards they were after". However, there was another Rolf Harris in captivity, in the Moscow Zoo, which Graeme had arranged to have delivered to the safari park in the hope that they would breed — and, a year later, in the "Rolfus Harriscus" enclosure, a baby Rolf Harris can be seen. All goes well until the Rolf Harrises escape from the safari park. The Goodies are upset at losing their latest star attractions, and are also very worried — Rolf Harrises used to be all over Australia, and they were prolific breeders.

Another year has passed, and England is overrun by millions of Rolf Harrises who proceed to make life uncomfortable for other people by their actions — including frightening small babies in their prams, taking over television broadcasts and completely dominating some sports teams. The Rolf Harrises also constantly splash paint everywhere (even onto people) and sing "Tie Me Kangaroo Down, Sport", accompanied by wobbleboards. They can lay Ostrich eggs and show one laying an egg inside a gentleman's bowler hat, and then slamming the hat down on the gentleman's head, then slapping the top and crushing the egg, then lifting the hat and splashing him with yolk over his face and suit, and then slamming the hat back down on his yolked head.

An anonymous Queen makes a proclamation — whosoever could rid England of the Rolf Harrises could marry her eldest son (Prince Charles), or receive a thousand OBEs. The Goodies dress like the Pied Piper of Hamelin, and play didgeridoos. It works and soon all of the Rolf Harrises follow the Goodies to the other side, Associated Television, where they are shut in, forever, never to be seen again ... except for one; as in the original children's tale, one "crippled boy" could not keep up with the other children and avoided their fate, here represented by Rolf Harris' popular children's character Jake the Peg, who has three legs.

== Cultural references ==
- Rolf Harris
- Tony Blackburn — (who appeared as himself in the episode). He was seen running for freedom to the theme from Black Beauty.
- Steptoe and Son
- Tommy Cooper
- Frank Ifield
- Morecambe and Wise
- The Pied Piper of Hamelin
- Monty Python's Flying Circus — with the appearance of four Gumbies
- The Black and White Minstrel Show
- Prince Charles, who was a well-known fan of both "The Goodies" and "The Goon Show".
- Max Bygraves
- Colditz
- Mary Poppins
- David Frost
- Michael Parkinson
- Liberace
- Brian Rix
- Danny La Rue

== Notes ==
- One of the plot elements refers to the introduction of non-native fauna, particularly rabbits, into Australia by British settlers and the disastrous effect this has had on the Australian environment.
- The version of this episode on the 1994 BBC Video release has been trimmed to remove shots of Dick Emery and Marty Feldman, a sequence featuring an unseen Little Jimmy Osmond singing 'Long Haired Lover From Liverpool' (which could not be cleared for commercial release), and to remove the ATV logo from the penultimate sequence, replacing it with a generic ITV logo – though Bill's references to Lew Grade in the episode are retained intact.
- Contrary to the impression gained by some people who saw the episode, Rolf Harris did not actually appear in the broadcast. However, he commented that he would have offered to be in this episode himself, if he had known about it beforehand.

== DVD and VHS releases ==
This episode has been released on VHS. However, it was not released on DVD in Region 2 until 2018, when the entire BBC series got a boxset release. The VHS edition, which includes two additional episodes, was reissued on Region 1 DVD in 2007.
