= Black and White Beauty =

- The Goodies episode
- Episode no.: Series 6 Episode 4
- Original air date: 12 October 1976

Guest appearance
- Karin MacCarthy

Episode chronology
← Previous "Daylight Robbery on the Orient Express"	Next → "It Might as Well Be String"

"Black and White Beauty" is an episode of the British comedy television series The Goodies.

Written by Graeme Garden and Bill Oddie with songs and music by Bill Oddie.

== Plot ==
Graeme is running a home for old pets, where he treats them with extreme cruelty. It soon becomes clear the animals are dead and have been frozen to keep them looking alive for their wealthy owners. Tim and Bill are appalled by Graeme's dishonesty until he offers them a share of the money. A black and white pantomime horse named Kenneth is delivered with a letter promising the life savings of two pensioners, on the condition the horse is trained and wins the Grand National. Tim renames the horse 'Black and White Beauty'.

Bill takes over a farm, while Tim and Graeme start training Black and White Beauty as a racehorse. Bill times Black and White Beauty during training and wants the horse for himself. During a strong wind, the horse is blown over a fence onto Bill's property. Bill claims ownership of the horse and treats it with horrifying cruelty: flogging it, machine-gunning it and reversing a tractor over it. Tim and Graeme, disguised as gypsies, try to steal the horse back, but when Bill almost catches them, they are forced to hide inside Black and White Beauty.

Bill rides Black and White Beauty (with Graeme and Tim in the horse suit) in the Grand National (competing against other pantomime horses). They are neck and neck with another horse near the finish, leading to a photo finish, where the two horses stop to pose for photos, allowing another horse to win the race. Having squandered the trio's money on a bet that Beauty would win the race, Bill forces Tim and Graeme (still inside the horse suit) to earn money by pulling a cart.

== Cultural references ==
- Black Beauty
- Steptoe and Son
- steeplechase
