= South Africa (The Goodies) =

- The Goodies episode
- Episode no.: Series 5 Episode 11
- Original air date: 21 April 1975

Guest appearances
- Philip Madoc as Tourist Agent / Customs Officer; Skip Martin as the New President of South Africa; Oscar James as Enoch Powell; Albert Wilkinson as Prime Minister

Episode chronology
← Previous "Fleet Street Goodies"	Next → "Bunfight at the O.K. Tea Rooms"

"South Africa" is an episode of the British comedy television series The Goodies.

This episode is also known as "Apartheight" and as "A South African Adventure".

Written by The Goodies, with songs and music by Bill Oddie.

== Plot ==
The Goodies are hired by a maniacally racist South African tourist agent to make an advertisement encouraging Britons to come to South Africa. While the campaign is successful, the tourist agent is unhappy with what they have done, since they showed black people in South Africa having a good time. Tim points out that South Africa has many black people, but the tourist agent retorts that they are not having a good time. The enraged agent forces the Goodies to emigrate to South Africa.

The influx of tourist boats the Goodies' advertisement brings allows the African population an opportunity to escape the country, leading to apartheid segregation disintegrating. To keep the economy going, apartheid is replaced by apartheight (apart-height), where tall people would dominate South African society. Bill, alongside the South African jockeys, turn out to be too short, and are now treated as the second class citizens of South Africa, and are put under curfew. Bill is also forced to work for Tim and Graeme, who both take full advantage of Bill's newly disadvantaged position and treat him like a slave. Bill takes charge of the situation, and he and the jockeys rebel and eventually win out against their 'masters'.

The Goodies return to the UK, where a group of black people approach them as though they were porters and hand them their bags to carry. They spot Queen Elizabeth II’s limousine where the hand of a black woman waves at them. Finally, they witness a television broadcast of a black man identified as Enoch Powell calling to “keep Britain black”. Realizing that the country had fallen into a reverse-apartheid system, the Goodies shrug at this and begin putting on blackface.

== Cultural references ==
- The Black and White Minstrel Show
- Song of the South

== DVD and VHS releases ==
This episode has been released on DVD.

== Bibliography ==
- "The Complete Goodies" — Robert Ross, B T Batsford, London, 2000
- "The Goodies Rule OK" — Robert Ross, Carlton Books Ltd, Sydney, 2006
- "From Fringe to Flying Circus — 'Celebrating a Unique Generation of Comedy 1960-1980'" — Roger Wilmut, Eyre Methuen Ltd, 1980
- "The Goodies Episode Summaries" — Brett Allender
- "The Goodies — Fact File" — Matthew K. Sharp
- "TV Heaven" — Jim Sangster & Paul Condon, HarperCollinsPublishers, London, 2005
