= Daylight Robbery on the Orient Express =

- The Goodies episode
- Episode no.: Series 6 Episode 3
- Original air date: 5 October 1976

Guest appearance
- Erik Chitty

Episode chronology
← Previous "Hype Pressure"	Next → "Black and White Beauty"

"Daylight Robbery on the Orient Express" is the third episode of the sixth series of the British television comedy series The Goodies. The 53rd episode of the show overall, it was first broadcast at 9 pm on BBC2.

It was written by Graeme Garden and Bill Oddie with songs and music by Bill Oddie.

== Plot ==
The Goodies have started a bogus holiday service, which is engaged by a Detectives Club for its annual outing. The Goodies arrange a mystery train tour aboard the Orient Express but have no intention of taking the train anywhere. The train is boarded by members of the club dressed as famous detectives. At the station, Bill creates the illusion the train is moving by running along the platform with various props, such as a cow, a tree and deer antlers. Inside the train, Graeme narrates the 'journey', while Tim wears female attire to represent each country the train is supposedly going through. A goat supplies extra verisimilitude.

Tim and Bill are getting tired and fed-up with Greame's loony deception of fooling the detectives and attempting to leave this racket for good.

However, The real mystery starts when the train starts moving and the detectives begin to disappear. Graeme sniffs a bottle labelled 'Arsenic' and says: "Aha! The characteristic smell of bitter almonds!" Bill asks: "Isn't that cyanide?" to which Graeme replies: "Precisely. This arsenic has been poisoned!"

More detectives disappear or die, prompting Bill to reference the original version of the rhyme from Agatha Christie's novel And Then There Were None: "Ten little <ahem>s, sitting down to dine, someone cut their cufflinks off, now, there's only nine." He later resumes, commenting: "Nine little <ahem>s, sitting there in state, someone lit the touchpaper, now, there's only eight."

The train keeps moving, not always on the railway. It transpires a group of badly behaved mimes, originally disguised as the Goodies, have hijacked the train as part of an attempt to win the legendary "Gold Bore" at the French "Le Boring" competition.

Using wheelchairs, the Goodies and the remaining detectives chase the mimes. The mimes are about to escape on a boat when the goat, also on wheels, butts one of them off a pier and into the boat, which sinks along with them.

== Cultural references ==
- "Murder on the Orient Express".
- Marcel Marceau — the Goodies, who are all excellent mimes, and who also do all of the dangerous stunts, themselves, look exactly like Marcel Marceau during the "Le Boring" segment.
- Ironside
- Hercule Poirot
- Miss Marple
- Ellery Queen
- John Shaft
- Kojak
- Sherlock Holmes & Doctor Watson.
- "And Then There Were None".
- Lord Peter Wimsey. The theme music from his 1972 BBC series was used in the episode as well.
