= Holiday (The Goodies) =

- The Goodies episode
- Episode no.: Series 9 Episode 6
- Original air date: 6 February 1982

Episode chronology
← Previous "Change of Life"	Next → "Animals Are People Too"

"Holiday" is an episode of the British comedy television series The Goodies.

This episode is also known as "Holidays" and as "The Holiday" and as "Holiday in Dunsquabbling".

This episode was made by LWT for ITV.

Written by Graeme Garden and Bill Oddie, with songs and music by Bill Oddie.

== Plot ==
Tim is fed up with being ignored by the overworked and short-tempered Bill and Graeme, and suggests a three-week holiday for them in a ramshackle, poorly designed, leaky cottage at country seaside called Dunsquabblin. After battling dismal weather, boredom, indoor birdwatching and failed attempts at relaxation, the team decide to stage a musical evening just like in the good old days.

== Cultural references ==
- Bill impersonates Animal from The Muppet Show during his assault on the pots-and-pans drumkit.
- The episode ends with a parody of The Good Old Days, a long-running BBC variety series, which degenerates into an Oi! shoutalong, complete with a destructive finale reminiscent of The Who.

== Notes ==
- Graeme makes references to Space Invaders, an early and extremely popular arcade game and plays with an oversized prop Rubik's Cube in one scene.
- On the DVD audio commentary, Bill Oddie notes that the card game played in this episode, 'Spat', bears some resemblance to Mornington Crescent from Brooke-Taylor and Garden's radio series I'm Sorry I Haven't A Clue.

== DVD and VHS releases ==
This episode has been released on DVD.
