= Earthanasia =

- The Goodies episode
- Episode no.: Series 7 Episode 6
- Original air date: 22 December 1977

Guest appearance
- Jon Glover

Episode chronology
← Previous "Royal Command"	Next → "Goodies and Politics"

"Earthanasia" is an episode of the British comedy television series The Goodies. It was written by Graeme Garden and Bill Oddie.

This episode is also known as "The End of the World Show" and "The End of the World".

== Plot ==
It is very late on Christmas Eve and Bill and Graeme are preparing for Christmas. Bill has bought himself a skateboard, while Graeme has bought a skateboard destruction kit (a gun, a hammer and a bomb with a detonator). A carol service on the radio is interrupted by an announcement that the world is going to end at midnight, because the United Nations has decided that this is the best route forward, with the ever-worsening problems of racism, over-population, inflation and pollution. Bill decides to enjoy the last 27-and-a-half minutes in an orgy of self-indulgence. Meanwhile, Graeme thinks about his accomplishments: Giant Kittens, Monster Cods and Eddie Waring impressions.

Tim arrives wearing a placard stating "The End of the World is Nigh", little realising how accurate the words actually are, and the placard also stating: "Meanwhile, eat at Tim's hot chestnut stall" and "Tim's nuts are nicest" (the word "is" is on a drawer, which holds the chestnuts).

Bill, telling Tim that there is going to be no Christmas Day, "On the other hand as you well know, tomorrow never comes. And do you know why?!" Tim comments: "No." Bill then says: "Because my dewy-eyed Timbalina, TOMORROW WE'LL ALL BE DEAD! DEAD! DEAD! D, E, D, D! DEAD! HAVE YOU GOT THAT?!?!"

As Tim starts to panic, Graeme makes plans to celebrate Christmas at 11:56 PM. The trio also decided to pass the time by contemplate their sins (or lack of, in Tim's case, as he feebly confessed to his friends such as forgetting to put the Christmas turkey in the oven, "tuck his shirt inside his underpants" and made "a bubble in the bath between his knees", as much to Bill and Graeme's disgust in Tim's pathetic excuses.) then tries to strangle him in a sinful fit of anger since he is too soppy to commit a deadly sin. Later on Graeme uses his psychotherapy to make Tim a new person by pare away the externals, namely Tim's Union Jack waistcoat, to find the underlying reason for Tim's problems. It is revealed that it was covering what he calls an "A-string", in which he then explains is "a G-string that's a bit higher up". Graeme decides to try to remove Tim's inhibitions, which centre on his belly button. Bill's attempts to help only make it worse by touching Tim's belly button and dressing up his mother.

After destroying Tim's belief that the Muppets are real, Graeme says: "it works! I've released his inhibitions through anger and violence. My work is at an end, I can die a happy man." Tim comes screaming into the room carrying the oven before smashing it into Graeme. Tim then runs off again as Graeme picks himself up, saying: "You shouldn't've hit me with that! You've ruined the cake!"

Then the television reports that with six minutes left until the end of the world, revellers are gathering at Covent Garden, Harrods is having a closing-down sale, and the British royal family has fled Earth for a new life on Saturn. Graeme tries to book a taxi to join the revellers, but it turns out to be too far away.

The Goodies share their feelings, worst embarrassments and mutual recriminations with the others, leading to complete personality overhauls for both Tim (who changes clothes completely) and Bill (who shaves his beard off, puts a suit on and takes his pet off his head, purely so that Tim can see him for who he truly is). Tim comes back into the room, showing off his belly button. Shocked, Bill says: "Cover up your nakedness!" to which Tim replies: "This isn't nakedness. This is my... BELLY BUTTON!!" Bill, now even more shocked, says: "Wash your mouth out."

Tim and Bill look anxiously at the clock as it reaches midnight, but nothing happens. There is a surprising final revelation from Graeme, who says that the world would not end at midnight due to his putting the clock forward - but only by half a minute. The world then explodes (an explosion sound is played with the white background, followed by a BBC1 station ID with the mirror globe spinning until it blows up).

== Cultural references ==
- The Muppet Show
- "The Stripper"

== DVD and VHS releases ==
This episode has been released on both DVD and VHS.
