= Football Crazy (The Goodies) =

- The Goodies episode
- Episode no.: Series 9 Episode 3
- Original air date: 16 January 1982

Guest appearances
- Wayne Sleep as himself; John Cross; Alan Forrester; Kim Gavin; Trevor Willis; Fred Dinenage as himself; Kenneth Wolstenholme as himself

Episode chronology
← Previous "Robot"	Next → "Big Foot"

"Football Crazy" is an episode of the British comedy television series The Goodies.

This episode was made by LWT for ITV.

Written by Graeme Garden and Bill Oddie, with songs and music by Bill Oddie.

== Plot ==
Football fans have become increasingly violent, and Bill, who is the worst offender, is arrested for disruptive behaviour by Tim (who has become a police officer). It is not Bill's first offence at the football and he proudly stands by while listing his previous misdemeanours as a spectator.

Tim naively believes that the players are also to blame for the violence by the length of their shorts, and their provocative on-field behaviour after scoring goals.

To cut down on the violence, it is decided that the shorts should be longer, and that only one fan be allowed to watch each game as a spectator in attendance — with a large number of police to keep the fan in check. Bill is the fan who is chosen to attend, and being the only fan, he becomes increasingly violent, bored and frustrated during the match because he has nobody to fight with.

Later, as a last resort against football violence, the sport is no longer played. However, although football no longer exists due to Tim's soppy attempt to control hooliganism and lack of knowleage of football, But the violence remains, and it finds a new outlet as more technical Greame conducts a mini-football field experiment with mice who merely "go eek and wash their whiskers, He proved gullible Tim that football has nothing to do with violence, Because hooliganism is inborn or in other words naturally (as displayed by his "purebred inborn hooligan hamster" who wildly heaves a paper streamer out of its box). But sceptical Tim dismissed Greame's theory, and claims that if this was true, there should be "thousands of mindless zombies banned from all the football grounds roaming the streets in search of alternative stimulation".

Tim decides to attend the ballet at Covent Garden. While walking to the theatre, he is worried about the number of violent-looking young men, dressed as sports fans, who are heading in the same direction. Tim is looking forward to seeing the ballet — but he is not impressed to discover that the violent-looking men are also members of the audience.

As the ballet starts, so, too, do the spectators, who are cheering or booing the dancers on the stage and Tim becomes a hooligan himself. Football spectator violence had become ballet spectator violence — and violent competition between football teams had now transferred to violent competition between the ballerinas and the male ballet dancers. The Goodies get caught up with what is happening on stage — Tim becomes a 'trainer', and both Graeme and Bill take part in the dance 'competition', where, dressed as ballerinas with football socks, they dance in opposition to the male ballet dancers. They dance against Aston Villa with their own team being Bill, Graeme, Kevin Keegan, Pelé, Johan Cruyff and Tim as manager.

== Cultural references ==
Classical music was subject to heckling during premieres, often degenerating into riots. The premiere of The Rite of Spring became particularly infamous for this.

== Notes ==
This was also the final episode to be filmed, as evidenced by Bill Oddie's shorter haircut and slightly longer

== DVD and VHS releases ==
This episode has been released on both DVD and VHS.
