= Kung Fu Kapers =

- The Goodies episode
- Episode no.: Series 5 Episode 7
- Original air date: 24 March 1975

Guest appearances
- Michael Barratt; Richard Pescud; William F. Sully

Episode chronology
← Previous "Scatty Safari"	Next → "Lighthouse Keeping Loonies"

"Kung Fu Kapers" (sometimes stylised as "Kung Fu Kapers!") is an episode of the British comedy television series The Goodies. It caused a viewer to die from laughing on the day the episode aired.

This episode is also known as "Ecky Thump". It was written by The Goodies, with songs and music by Bill Oddie.

In January 2020, "Kung Fu Kapers" was announced as the fans' favourite episode of The Goodies, during the celebration of the show's 50th anniversary at Bristol's Slapstick Festival.

== Plot ==
Tim and Graeme are attempting to learn kung fu in the Goodies' office, but Bill is extremely disparaging of their techniques and shows them that he knows some rather impressive martial arts skills of his own. Under pressure from the other two, Bill reveals himself as a master of the secret Lancashire martial art known as "Ecky Thump"—which mostly revolves around hitting unsuspecting people with black puddings while wearing flat caps and braces.

With great reluctance, Bill agrees to demonstrate this "ancient Lancastrian art" in a series of bouts against Tim and Graeme (who pose as various martial arts experts who are "foreign members of their families"). Bill wins against every "expert" merely by hitting them over the head with the black pudding, except the Scots one who is knocked out by a wayward boomerang. Tim ends up with all four limbs in plaster, in a "kung fu"-style stance, so he will be "ready" if Bill comes back. Graeme points out that Tim can not actually move. Bill has meanwhile opened a profitable Ecky Thump school, and subsequently stars in a series of martial arts flicks, such as Ecky-Thump Meets Mary Poppins and Enter With Drag On (parodying Enter the Dragon).

Bill then comes in and invites Tim and Graeme to join his 'cult', though the others refuse, and later go to Rochdale to stop him. Whilst there, they encounter a 'Lancastrian tea ceremony' being done by members of the cult, and find that Bill has changed his name to 'High Priest Ee Ba Goom' ('ee by gum' being a stereotypically Northern English expression) and has written a little red book. He then announces a plan to march on Parliament, claiming that the Night of Long Knives will be severely dwarfed by the 'Day of Black Puddings'.

The night before Bill and his Ecky Thump "army" are to go on the march to attack with their black puddings, Graeme adds a "remote control device" to the black pudding mixture – leading to unexpectedly wayward black puddings for a bewildered Bill and his equally bemused Ecky Thump followers. The devices send the pudding haywire, triggering chaos among the Ecky Thump cult and their march to Parliament. With the march in disarray, Tim attempts taking on Bill in revenge for putting him in plaster, only for Bill take him down by spraying him with tea. Graeme makes his move but Bill sends him crashing into a fence.

Bill tries to relieve himself with some tea but Tim and Graeme re-emerge, forcing him to make his escape downhill on the tea trolley. Tim and Graeme catch up with him and they struggle on the moving trolley. The speeding trolley takes them over a cliff edge where the Goodies dramatically fall to their deaths or possibly fatal injuries. A brief voice-over (from Tim) states:

We would like to point out that Ecky Thump is the ancient Lancastrian art of self-defence. If practised by the untrained, it could be dangerous.

== Background ==
At the time the episode was made, kung fu was a craze which was sweeping the UK with films such as Enter the Dragon, the television series Kung Fu, the song "Kung Fu Fighting", many martial arts schools appearing in gyms, and even a fragrance for men called 'Hai-Karate'.

== Viewer death ==
The episode is infamous for it leading to a man laughing to death. Fifty-year-old Alex Mitchell could not stop laughing for a continuous 25-minute period—almost the entire length of the show—and suffered a fatal heart attack as a result of the strain placed on his heart. Mitchell's widow later sent the Goodies a letter thanking them for making his final moments so pleasant.

In May 2012, Mitchell's granddaughter, Lisa Corke, suffered a heart attack at the age of 23. She was diagnosed with long QT syndrome, and the doctors caring for her believe it is likely that Mitchell suffered from the same hereditary condition.

== DVD and VHS releases ==
This episode has been released on both DVD and VHS.
