= Fleet Street Goodies =

- The Goodies episode
- Episode no.: Series 5 Episode 10
- Original air date: 14 April 1975

Guest appearances
- Tessa Wyatt as Mildred Makepeace; Roland MacLeod as Sir Joshua Makepeace; Karin MacCarthy as Katie Pimple

Episode chronology
| ← Previous "Rome Antics" | Next → "South Africa" |

"Fleet Street Goodies" (also known as "Cunning Stunts" and "The 'Goodies Clarion' Newspaper") is an episode of the British comedy television series The Goodies. Written by The Goodies, with songs and music by Bill Oddie.

== Plot ==
At the Goodies office, which is being used for their newspaper Clarion & Globe, Bill is sighing sloppily over the framed photo of a very pretty girl, instead of concentrating on his job as a 'roving reporter'. When he is sent out on the street as a reporter, he returns to the office saying that nothing had happened that was newsworthy (this was in spite of a number of very unusual happenings taking place during Bill's walk). Then Bill remembers one item of interest, and Tim and Graeme look at him expecting a front-page scoop for their newspaper — but Bill's important item of news is that his "hat blew off".

There is a comment that the father of the pretty girl, Mildred Makepeace, is willing to allow his daughter to marry the man who could make him laugh (he had not been able to laugh for years). Trying to get Bill to concentrate on the work he was supposed to be doing for the newspaper, Graeme and Tim arrange for Bill's romance to progress, by giving him a few lessons in what to do to make Mildred's father laugh again so that Bill could marry Mildred. However, the plan fails because one of the suggestions comes a bit too close to home for Mildred's father's liking, and the furious Mr. Makepeace refuses to sanction a wedding between his daughter and Bill.

Bill arrives back at the office, moping, and not being able to concentrate on his work. Tim and Graeme decide to fire him and get another reporter to take his place. Their 'going away' present to Bill does nothing to cheer him up — nor does the misspelling of his name on the gift.

Bill tells Mr. Makepeace the tragic tale of how Tim and Graeme have been treating him. Bill's sad tale of woe has an unusual effect on Mr. Makepeace and he bursts out laughing. Bill attempts to claim Mildred's hand in marriage, but Mr. Makepeace tells him that it is too late: Mildred has left him because he was such a miserable character, and therefore he cannot offer her hand in marriage anymore.

During the time that Tim and Graeme are searching for a replacement for Bill, Tim receives an application for the job by telephone. The applicant is obviously Prince Charles. Tim hangs up the phone and Graeme asks: "Who was that?" to which Tim replies: "I'm not sure, but I think it was Bluebottle." Also, during this time, the doorbell rings and Graeme opens the door. The strains of the Liberty Bell March come through the open door and Graeme tells them: "Push off! We don't want your type here!" Graeme slams the door shut, saying: "Bloody Band of the Coldstream Guards!"

The replacement reporter who turns up to take Bill's place at the Clarion & Globe is none other than Bill's lost love, Mildred Makepeace, who no longer seems interested in him. Mildred's beauty pleases Tim and Graeme, but it also masks some hidden depths which neither Tim nor Graeme appreciate in a workplace colleague. They decide to get Bill back as the newspaper's reporter, but Mildred had already taken over the business and does not allow Tim and Graeme to have time off and tells them if they're leaving the office, they'll never coming back. The two ignored Mildred's snobbiness and are shocked about what Bill have written in his letter.

Bill attempts to commit suicide by signing up to take part in the Eurovision Raving Loony Contest as the British competitor. The "Eurovision Raving Loony Contest" is a contest in which the competitors attempt to harm, maim, and preferably, kill, themselves in the most spectacular way possible (points awarded on spectacle and success of attempt). Bill takes on all the most dangerous feats he can think of.

Tim and Graeme sign on to take part in the Eurovision Raving Loony Contest, as competitors for the rest of the world, so that they can guard Bill from harm. However, while Bill remains unhurt throughout his adventures, Tim and Graeme pay the penalty for their altruism and good intentions by suffering in their quest to save Bill.

== Cultural references ==
- Monty Python's Flying Circus - Liberty Bell March
- Eurovision Competitions, such as the Eurovision Song Contest.
- Katie Boyle, who was a presenter with the BBC at the time that the episode aired. She occasionally presented the Eurovision Song Contest on the BBC.
- Prince Charles, who was a well-known fan of both The Goodies and The Goon Show.
