= Corbet Woodall =

English BBC newsreader (1929–1982)

Corbet Stafford Woodall (6 April 1929 – 19 May 1982) was an English newsreader for the BBC.

== Career ==
Born in Hampshire, he was educated as an Oppidan scholar at Eton College where he also excelled at sports. He worked in the 1950s for the New Zealand Broadcasting Corporation, before returning to Britain where he initially worked as a stage manager on outside broadcasts. He then became an announcer on the Home Service, moving to work on television in 1963. He became part of the team of regular BBC newsreaders, the others being Robert Dougall, Michael Aspel and Richard Baker. After leaving national BBC Television in 1967, he presented Look East, and, as a freelance broadcaster, contributed to the Today programme. He also chaired editions of Any Questions? and Any Answers?.

Woodall appeared in many television series, and also in some films, in which he invariably acted as either a television newsreader, or as an announcer. On television, Woodall appeared in several episodes of The Goodies, as well as Steptoe and Son, A Fine Romance and Whatever Happened to the Likely Lads?, among others. Increasingly disabled by rheumatoid arthritis from the late 1960s, Woodall's frequent appearances on The Goodies (1970–1981) would have been more frequent, but according to author Robert Ross in his book The Goodies Rule OK his contract was often marked "Artist ill". In an interview with Ross, Tim Brooke-Taylor praised Woodall's professionalism in wake of his debilitating illness. "He wasn't a well man at all, but (on camera) he rose from the dead and delivered every time."

Towards the end of his life, Woodall became a committed supporter of the Arthritis and Rheumatism Council (now Arthritis Research UK) and by appearing in a Christmas television appeal for the charity in 1981, raised the sum of £72,000; at that time a record for an appeal of that kind. Woodall recounted his struggle with the illness in his autobiography Disjointed Life, which he hoped would help medical professionals to understand the mental and emotional aspects of the condition.

== Filmography ==
Year	Title	Role	Notes
1974	Don't Just Lie There, Say Something!	Newsreader	
1978	Carry On Emmannuelle	I.T.N. Newscaster	
1979	The World Is Full of Married Men	TV Announcer	
