= List of BBC Radio 4 programmes =

Programming broadcast on the British talk radio station

This is a list of current and former programmes broadcast on BBC Radio 4.

When it came into existence – on 30 September 1967 – Radio 4 inherited a great many continuing programme series which had been initiated prior to that date by its predecessor, the BBC Home Service (1939–1967), and in some cases even by stations which had preceded the Home Service. Such inherited programmes are included in the list.

The years indicated in brackets after programme titles refer to the dates, where known, of each programme's first, subsequent, and final broadcasts – and, in cases where Radio 4 programmes began their run on stations other than the Home Service, the names of those originating stations are also shown.

Note that many of Radio 4's past comedy and drama productions have been, and continue to be repeatedly rerun on Radio 4, as well as on the digital radio channel BBC Radio 4 Extra (previously BBC Radio 7).

== News and current affairs ==
- The Africans (2007)
- Americana (2009–11)
- Analysis (1970–)
- Any Answers? (1955–)
- Any Questions? (1948–)
- Asian Diasporas (2007–)
- The Bottom Line (2006–)
- The Briefing Room
- Broadcasting House (1998–)
- Checkpoint (1973–85) (became Face The Facts)
- The Commission
- The Copysnatchers
- Crossing Continents (2002–)
- Does He Take Sugar? (1977–98)
- Face the Facts (1984–2015)
- Farming Today (1964-)
- Farming Today This Week
- File on 4 (1975–)
- From Our Own Correspondent (1955–)
- In Business (1975–)
- In Search of the British Work Ethic (2010)
- In Touch (1961–)
- Inside Money
- iPM (2007–?)
- Law in Action
- Letter from America (1946–2004)
- Midnight News
- Money Box (1977–)
- More or Less
- Nice Work (2002–05)
- Newshour (From September 2026–)
- The Pariah Profession
- PM (1970–)
- A Point of View (2005–2025)
- The Politics of Hunger
- Profile
- Seven Days
- Six O'Clock News
- Sport on Four (1977–98)
- Straw Poll
- Straw Poll Talk Back
- Taking Issue
- Taking a Stand
- Talking Politics
- Today (1957–)
- Today in Parliament (1945–)
- United Nations or Not?
- Week in Westminster
- The Westminster Hour
- With Us or Against Us
- The World at One (1965–)
- The World This Weekend
- The World Tonight (1970–2026)
- Yesterday in Parliament (1947 Light Programme; 1957–)

== Drama ==
- 15 Minute Drama
- A Touch of Mistletoe
- The Archers
- Cashcows
- Children of the Stones
- Classic Serial
- Dr, Finlay's Casebook
- Drama
- The Friday Play
- The Lovecraft Investigations
- Neverwhere
- Paul Temple
- Saturday Night Theatre (1943–96)
- The Stone Tape
- Talk to Sleep, 4-part comedy-drama by John Dryden
- Tracks
- Tumanbay

== Arts ==
- The Afternoon Reading
- Back Row
- Book at Bedtime (1949–57 Light Programme; 1962–)
- Book of the Week
- Bookclub
- Bookshelf (created by Frank Delaney in 1978)
- The Film Programme
- Front Row
- A Good Read
- Kaleidoscope (1973–98)
- Loose Ends (1985–)
- The Heard
- Moving Pictures
- Open Book
- Poetry Please
- Radio Lives, (1990–96) profiles of radio personalities
- Radio Roots, profiles of radio personalities
- The Saturday Play
- Saturday Review
- Soul Music
- White Nights
- With Great Pleasure

== Quizzes ==
- Counterpoint (1986–)
- Brain of Britain
- Masterteam, general knowledge quiz (2001–2006)
- Prompt!, theatre quiz (1986–1988)
- Round Britain Quiz
- The 3rd Degree
- Wildbrain, natural history quiz (1997–2002)
- X Marks the Spot (1998–2006)

== Comedy ==
=== Panel games ===
- Armando Iannucci's Charm Offensive (2005–08), satirical quiz
- Does the Team Think? (1957–67 Light Programme; 1968, 1970–73 Radio 2; 1970–71, 1974–76 Radio 4; 2007–09 Radio 2), parody of Any Questions?
- Foul Play, writers are asked to solve a murder mystery written by host Simon Brett
- Heresy (2003–), the presenter and a panel of guests commit "heresy" by challenging people's most deeply held opinions on a subject
- I Guess That's Why They Call It The News (2009), satirical news-based quiz
- I'm Sorry I Haven't a Clue (1972–), nonsensical word and musical games played by comedians
- Inspiration, quiz about inventions presented by Chris Stuart
- It's Your Round (2011), game in which each contestant suggests a game to play for one round
- Just a Minute (1967–), parlour game involving speaking without hesitation, deviation, or repetition
- King Stupid, earlier version of panel game The 99p Challenge
- Many a Slip (1964–79), contestants must spot mistakes in texts and music
- The Motion Show
- My Music (1967–93), musical games
- My Word! (1956–90), word games played by comedy writers and journalists
- The News Quiz (1977–), satirical quiz on week's news
- The 99p Challenge (1998–2004), silly games and tasks
- The Personality Test (2006–07), a guest host asks questions about his or herself
- Petticoat Line (1965–1976), all female discussion
- Puzzle Panel (1998–2005), puzzles
- Quote... Unquote (1976–), quiz about quotations
- So Wrong It's Right (2010–12), Charlie Brooker asks his guests to invent or nominate really awful things
- The Unbelievable Truth (2007–), game in which contestants deliver a mostly untrue speech and panelists must identify true statements
- We've Been Here Before, historically oriented panel show with Clive Anderson
- Whispers (2003–05), quiz about celebrity rumours and gossip
- Who Goes There, biographical quiz
- Whose Line is it Anyway? (1988), improvisational comedy game
- The Write Stuff (1998–2014), questions about literature and writing parodies of a specific author
- Wing it (2024– ), an improv panel show

=== Sitcoms ===
- Absolute Power (2000–4), public relations company satire
- Acropolis Now (2000–2), the fictional adventures of historical figures in ancient Greece
- After Henry (1985–89), about three generations of women living together following a bereavement
- Alison and Maud (2002–04), sitcom about sisters running a bed and breakfast
- All Gas and Gaiters (1966–71), church farce starring Derek Nimmo
- All the Young Dudes (2001–02), comedy-drama written by and starring Jim Sweeney
- As Time Goes By (1997–99), radio adaptation of BBC TV sitcom (1992–2005) about a rekindled romance
- At Home with the Snails (2001–02), somewhat surreal family sitcom about the dysfunctional family of a man who is obsessed with snails
- The Attractive Young Rabbi (1999–2002), gentle comedy about the clash of attitudes between a young female Reform Rabbi and an older, more traditional male Orthodox Rabbi
- Ballylenon (1994-9 and 2009–10), sitcom set in a 1950s County Donegal village
- Beta Female
- The Big Business Lark (1969), sitcom set in the boardroom of a national plastics business
- The Big Town All Stars (1998–2001), sitcom about an up-and-coming a cappella group
- The Bigger Issues (2002–03), set in the world of fringe theatre
- Bleak Expectations (2007–2012), Dickensian parody
- Brian Gulliver's Travels (2011–12), a satirical modern pastiche of Gulliver's Travels
- The Brothers (2004–07), sitcom about two brothers who give up their careers to design websites
- Brothers in Law (1970–2), legal comedy with Richard Briers, based on the TV series
- The Cabaret of Dr Caligari, macabre comedy
- Cabin Pressure, comedy about a very small airline with one plane
- The Castle, medieval parody
- Chambers, legal sitcom, later moving to TV
- Clare in the Community, about a social worker
- Count Arthur Strong, adventures of elderly comedian prone to malapropism
- Dad's Army (1973–75), about the Home Guard during World War II
- Deep Trouble, nuclear submarine comedy
- Delve Special, investigative journalism parody
- The Department, satirical comedy about a mysterious organisation
- Do Nothing till You Hear from Me, about a trumpet player
- Double Income, No Kids Yet, about a childless couple surrounded by families
- Double Science, about school science teachers
- Ed Reardon's Week, a struggling and aging writer
- Elephants to Catch Eels, historical sitcom about Cornish smugglers
- ElvenQuest, fantasy parody
- The Embassy Lark, diplomatic comedy
- Fags, Mags and Bags (2007–), set in a newsagent/general store
- The Fall Of The Mausoleum Club (1988), macabre comedy starring Jim Broadbent
- Fallen Arches (1988–89)
- Four Joneses and a Jenkins, family comedy-drama set in rural Wales
- Flatshare by Beth O'Leary
- Flying the Flag (1987–92), Cold War diplomatic satire
- Flywheel, Shyster and Flywheel (on Radio 4 1990–2, originally made for NBC Blue Network), law firm satire featuring the Marx Brothers
- Giles Wemmbley Hogg Goes Off, adventures of a posh idiot travelling the world
- Gloomsbury, a parody on the Bloomsbury Set
- Hinge and Bracket, musical comedy from female impersonators:
  - At Home with Hinge and Bracket (1990)
  - The Enchanting World of Hinge and Bracket (1977–1979)
  - The Random Jottings of Hinge and Bracket (1982–1989)
- The Hitchhiker's Guide to the Galaxy (1978, 1980, 2004–5), science fiction comedy by Douglas Adams
- Hordes of the Things, parody of The Lord of the Rings
- The House of the Spirit Levels, parody of business and northern family sagas
- Hut 33 (2007–09), set among code-breakers at Bletchley Park
- I Think I've Got a Problem, musical comedy with Bob Monkhouse and Suggs
- In the..., black comedies based on Mark Tavener's writing
  - In the Red
  - In the Balance
  - In the Chair
  - In the End
- King Street Junior, junior school
- Knowing Me, Knowing You (1992–93), parody celebrity chatshow with Steve Coogan's incompetent presenter character
- Ladies of Letters, sitcom with Patricia Routledge and Prunella Scales playing elderly correspondents
- Legal, Decent, Honest and Truthful, advertising satire starring Martin Jarvis
- Lenin of the Rovers
- Linda Smith's A Brief History of Timewasting
- The Little Big Woman Show, sitcom about a wannabe singer working as a temp
- Little Blighty on the Down (1988–92), satirical village comedy
- A Little Night Exposure (1978)
- Living with the Enemy, former left-wing comedian and right-wing politician forced into house-share
- The Long Dark Tea-Time of the Soul, Douglas Adams adaptation
- Man of Soup, sitcom set in post-Soviet eastern Europe
- The Masterson Inheritance, improvised historical comedy parodying costume drama
- McKay the New (1989–91), sitcom
- The Men from the Ministry (1962–77), civil service farce
- Millport, set in main town of Great Cumbrae, island in River Clyde
- Milton Jones, pun-driven stories:
  - Another Case of Milton Jones
  - The House of Milton Jones
  - The Very World of Milton Jones
- Mr and Mrs Smith, marriage guidance sitcom by British comedian Will Smith
- Mr Blue Sky show about an optimistic family man by Andrew Collins
- More Mr Mulliner, from PG Wodehouse's stories
- The Motorway Men (1972), sitcom about labourers building motorways
- Nebulous, post-apocalyptic
- The Next Programme Follows Almost Immediately, 1970s show set in a comedy factory starring David Jason
- The Nick Revell Show, absurdist sitcom about a writer and his talking geraniums
- Night Class, Johnny Vegas sitcom about a pottery teacher
- No Commitments, about three sisters
- Not Today, Thank You, absurdist comedy about broadcasting
- Old Dog and the Partridge, pub sitcom
- Old Harry's Game, Andy Hamilton comedy about Satan
- Our Brave Boys, set in British Ministry of Defence
- Parsley Sidings, set in a quiet railway station
- Party, about young people founding a new political party
- The Quanderhorn Xperimentations (2018), a science fiction spoof by Rob Grant and Andrew Marshall
- The Rapid Eye Movement, sitcom about a writer with tiny actors living in his head
- Reluctant Persuaders, London's worst advertising agency. Written by Edward Rowett. Stars Nigel Havers, Josie Lawrence, Mathew Baynton, Rasmus Hardiker, Olivia Nixon and Kieran Hodgson
- Rent, house share comedy
- Revolting People, set in North America in the run-up to the American Revolutionary War
- Rigor Mortis, in hospital pathology department
- Ring Around the Bath, domestic sitcom
- Robin and Wendy's Wet Weekends
- Romantic Friction, sitcom about a romance writer
- Ronan the Amphibian (2003), about a financial adviser turned into an amphibian by aliens
- Rudy's Rare Records, set in a reggae record store starring Lenny Henry
- Scenes from Provincial Life, adaptation of William Cooper's novel
- Sean Lock:
  - Sean Lock, 15 Storeys High, sitcom
  - Sean Lock's 15 Minutes Of Misery, sitcom
- Seymour the Fractal Cat, science fiction
- Share and Share Alike, sitcom about two brothers who must learn to live peacefully with each other
- The Six Mothers-in-law of Henry VIII (2003), an unreliable history of Tudor times created and written by Barry Grossman
- The Shuttleworths, comedy about domestic life of character John Shuttleworth
- Smelling of Roses, Prunella Scales as an event manager
- Snap, divorce sitcom by Paul Mendelson
- The Sofa of Time, fantasy comedy
- Something or Other, dark comedy by Alex Bartlette and Grant Cathro
- Stanley Baxter and Friends, series of 4 sitcoms
- Stockport, so Good they Named it Once, comedy drama
- Think the Unthinkable (2001–05), about management consultants
- Three Men Went to Mow (2002–03), gardening sitcom
- Tim Merryman's Days of Clover (2003), business sitcom
- Time For Mrs Milliner, Jane Asher hat-making sitcom
- To the Manor Born
- Toad Squad, episode of Hopes and Desires re-broadcast as a one-off
- Truly, Madly, Bletchley, sitcom about public access radio
- Two Doors Down, sitcom set in suburban Glasgow
- Unnatural Acts, sitcom about a married couple
- Up the Garden Path, family comedy from Sue Limb's novel
- Tomorrow, Today!, science fiction parody
- Vongole, campus comedy with Bill Nighy
- Weak at the Top, business and management satire
- Whatever Happened to the Likely Lads? (1975), adaptation of TV series about two working-class men
- Creighton Wheeler, a Zelig-like figure in two series:
  - Wheeler's Fortune
  - Wheeler's Wonder
- A Whole 'Nother Story, sitcom
- Wild Things, garden centre sitcom
- Winston in Love, Peter Tinniswood sitcom
- The Wordsmiths at Gorsemere, romantic poetry spoof by Sue Limb from her book
- World of Pub, pub sitcom
- Yes Minister, adaptation of satire about politician and civil service
- You'll Have Had Your Tea (2002–07), silly Scottish comedy using Barry Cryer and Graeme Garden's long-running characters

=== Sketch shows ===
- And Now in Colour, sketch show
- Armstrong and Miller
- The Atkinson People, spoof profiles
- Auntie's Secret Box (1996)
- Beachcomber, by the Way, surreal comedy
- Bearded Ladies
- The Big Booth, sketch show with Boothby Graffoe and others
- Bigipedia, high-concept sketch show set within a fictional wikipedia-like website
- The Burkiss Way
- The Cheese Shop
- Chewin' the Fat
- The Children's Hour, spoof children's show reports
- Cliché (1981)
- Concrete Cow (2002–03)
- The Consultants (2003–05)
- The Curried Goat Show, sketch show
- Dan and Nick: The Wildebeest Years
- Dead Ringers
- Dial M for Pizza
- Don't Start
- Down the Line
- Five Squeezy Pieces, largely female sketch show
- Forty Nights in the Wildebeest sketch show, follow up to Dan and Nick: The Wildebeest Years
- Goodness Gracious Me
- The Grumbleweeds Radio Show (1979–88 Radio 2; ? –91)
- The Harpoon
- Harry Hill's Fruit Corner
- Hearing with Hegley, sketch show with poet John Hegley
- The Hudson and Pepperdine Show
- The In Crowd, sketch show from Manchester including Robin Ince
- In One Ear, sketch show
- Injury Time (1980–82), Oxbridge performers in revue sketches
- The Jason Explanation, sketch show with David Jason
- John Finnemore's Souvenir Programme (2011 to present)
- Laura Solon: Talking and Not Talking
- The League Against Tedium, Simon Munnery
- On the Town With the League of Gentlemen (1997)
- Lines From My Grandfather's Forehead (1971–72)
- Lionel Nimrod's Inexplicable World, parodic show exploring a different topic each week
- Listen Against, parodying British radio
- Listen to Les, Les Dawson
- Little Britain
- A Look Back at the Nineties, satirical sketches
- Marriott's Monologues, monologues by comic writer Marriott Edgar
- The Mel and Sue Thing
- The Michael Bentine Show
- The Boosh
- The Miles and Millner Show, music and sketches
- The Milligan Papers
- Milligna (or Your Favourite Spike), Spike Milligan sketch show
- The Million Pound Radio Show
- The Museum of Everything
- Naked Radio
- The Now Show (1998–2024)
- The Omar Khayyam Show, Spike Milligan comedy
- On the Hour (1991–92)
- The Pin, winner of 'Best Comedy' at 2016 BBC Radio Awards
- Radio Active (1980–7)
- Radio9
- The Reduced Shakespeare Radio Show, Shakespeare parody
- Round The Horne
- Saturday Night Fry (1988)
- Six Geese a Laying, Zoe Lyons
- The Six Mothers in Law of Henry VIII, parodic history documentary
- The Skewer
- The Skivers, sketches
- The Small World of Dominic Holland, standup and sketches
- Son of Cliché (1983–84)
- Struck Off and Die, medical themed sketches and vox pops
- The Sunday Format
- A Swift Laugh, Griff Rhys Jones selects great comedy moments
- That Mitchell and Webb Sound
- This Is Craig Brown, satirical sketches
- Time of the Week
- Two Thousand Years of Radio, comedy with Claire Downes and Stuart Lane
- Week Ending (1970–98)

=== Individual comedy plays ===
- The 15 Minute Musical (2004–)
- Kenneth William's Playhouse (1975)
- Trapped, series of comedy dramas about trapped people, by Mark and Daniel Maier

=== Stand-up, cabaret, and variety ===
- Alexei Sayle's Imaginary Sandwich Bar
- Boothby Graffoe In No Particular Order
- The Cabaret Upstairs, introduced by Clive Anderson
- Four at the Store, stand-up
- Four in a Field, stand-up from Glastonbury Festival and Latitude Festival
- The Frankie Howerd (Variety) Show
- Henry Normal's Encyclopedia Poetica, spoof guide to poetry with readings from comic poets
- Ken Dodd's Palace of Laughter, from his touring show
- The Ken Dodd Show
- King Cutler, Phyllis King and Ivor Cutler performing songs, poems, and stories
- Mark Watson Makes the World Substantially Better
- Mark Steel's in Town, performed in venues around (and outside) the UK
- Ross Noble Goes Global (2002–04)
- Ross Noble On...
- A Set and a Song, comedy and music
- Sounding Off with McGough, performances by poet Roger McGough
- Stand Up 2
- Stand Up America
- Stand Up Great Britain
- Stand Ups and Strumpets

=== Talks ===
- Chris Addison:
  - The Ape That Got Lucky
  - Chris Addison's Civilisation (2006)
- Fanshawe Gets to the Bottom of
- Frank Muir Goes Into, comedian takes a humorous look at different topics
- Guy Browning's Small Talk, humorous life coaching advice
- Rainer Hersch:
  - All Classical Music Explained
  - Rainer Hersch's 20th Century Retrospective
  - It's a Fair Cop
- Jeremy Hardy Speaks to the Nation
- Life, Death and Sex with Mike and Sue
- Mark Steel:
  - The Mark Steel Lectures (1999–2002)
  - The Mark Steel Revolution (1998)
  - The Mark Steel Solution (1992 Radio 5; 1994–96)
- Mitch Benn's Crimes Against Music
- People Like Us (1995–97)
- The Problem with Adam Bloom with Adam Bloom
- Round Ireland with a Fridge, by Tony Hawks, later a film
- Where Did It All Go Wrong?, monologues from Simon Munnery
- Will Smith Presents the Tao of Bergerac

=== Documentaries ===
- Absent Friends, documentary about off-screen comedy characters by Alan Stafford
- The Borscht Belt, documentary by David Prest
- Cartoons, Lampoons, and Buffoons (1998)
- Comedy Album Heroes, Greg Proops presents show about classic comedy albums
- Double Trouble, documentary about famous comedy double acts
- Fred Housego's Unknowns, documentary about lesser-known comedians
- How Tickled Am I, profiles of comedians and comic actors by Mark Radcliffe
- Palace of Laughter (2002–03), Geoffrey Wheeler visits old music halls
- Radio Anarchists, profile of American 1960s pranksters Coyle and Sharpe
- Radio Fun, series on comics presented by Bob Monkhouse
- Should We Be Laughing?, documentary about disability in comedy
- Six Characters in Search of an Answer, profiling well-known comedy characters
- There'll Never be Another, documentary on comedy with Graeme Garden
- Turns of the Century, comedy documentary

== Science, technology and medicine ==
- All in the Mind (2003–)
- Another Five Numbers
- Brief History of the End of Everything
- Britain's X-Files
- Case Notes
- A Cell for All Seasons
- Changing Places
- Check Up
- Climate Wars
- The Columbia Astronauts
- Connect
- Costing the Earth
- Dial a Scientist — (~1976) (see Brian J. Ford (scientist))
- Emotional Rollercoaster
- Five Numbers
- Frontiers
- The Good, the Bad and the Ugly
- Home Planet
- The Infinite Monkey Cage
- The Life Scientific
- Land Lines
- Leading Edge
- Life as an Adult
- Life as a Teenager
- Life in Middle Age
- Lifeblood
- Living with Pain
- Living World
- Material World
- Medicine Now
- Mind Changers
- The Mozart Effect
- Nature
- Nature's Magic
- The New X-Files
- One Man's Medicine
- Patient Progress: Strokes
- Rainforests of the Deep
- Red Planet
- Reith Lectures
- Science Now (1974–1975+ (?)) (see Brian J. Ford)
- Scientists in a Shoebox
- Seeds of Trouble
- Small Dog on Mars
- Stars in Their Eyes
- Swan Migration
- Tales of Cats and Comets
- Think About It
- Tweet of the Day (2013-)
- A Twist to Life
- Unearthing Mysteries
- Walk Out to Winter
- What Remains to Be Discovered?
- Whatever you think
- Where are you taking us?
- Wild Europe
- Wild Underground
- World on the Move
- Wrestling with Words

== Religion and ethics ==
- Bells on Sunday
- Beyond Belief
- Bigots and Believers
- The Choice
- Church Going
- The Daily Service (1925 Daventry 5XX; 1929 National Programme; 1939–)
- Devout Sceptics
- Four Noble Truths
- A Higher Place (2002)
- In the Footsteps of Moses
- Lent Talks
- The Long Search (1977)
- Missionaries
- The Moral Maze (1990–)
- Prayer for the Day
- The Real Patron Saints
- Something Understood (1995–)
- Sounding the Divine
- Sunday
- Sunday Worship
- Ten to Eight (1965–70)
- Thought for the Day (1970–)
- Words from the Cross

== History ==
- A History of the World in 100 Objects (2010–)
- The Norman Way (2004)
- Apprentice
- Back to Beeching
- The Child Migrants
- City of the Sharp Nosed Fish
- Creme de la Crime, documentary about famous crimes with Steve Punt and Hugh Dennis
- The Dark Origins of Britain
- The Decade of Self-doubt
- Document
- Falkland Families
- For What It's Worth
- Great Lives
- Heroes and Villains
- A History of Human Folly
- In Our Time (1998–)
- Lend Me Your Ears
- The Long View
- Making History
- Mapping the Town
- Memory Like Shells Bursting
- Reconciling Histories
- The Reunion
- The Roman Way
- The Routes of English
- The Secret Museum
- Soldier, Sailor
- Spies R US: the history of the CIA
- The Telemark Heroes
- This Sceptred Isle (1995–)
- The Three Voyages of Captain Cook
- Tiger Tales
- Voices of the Powerless
- What If..?
- Why Did We Do That?

== Factual and Documentaries ==
- Archive on 4
- Between Ourselves
- Breakaway (1979–98)
- Cartoon Clichés
- Chetham's School of Music
- Community Caring
- Cutting a Dash
- A Dance through Time
- Darcus and Dickens
- Deep Blue
- Desert Island Discs (1942–), long-running show in which a guest picks their favourite records
- A Different World
- Down Your Way
- Excess Baggage
- Feedback: Radio series
- File on 4, documentary reports
- The Food Programme
- Four Corners
- Four Thought
- Herbs: Pure and Simple
- Home This Afternoon (1964–70)
- The House I Grew Up In
- Gardeners' Question Time (1947–), long-running horticultural advice from a panel of experts
- Go 4 It
- Going Places
- Great Lives
- Home Truths (1998–2006)
- In Living Memory
- In Our Time (2002–)
- In Touch
- An Indian in Bloomsbury
- Is It On?
- It's My Story: Physician, Heal Thyself
- Last Word
- The Learning Curve
- Let's Pretend
- Lights Out (2018 - 2023)
- Lives in a Landscape
- The Message
- Nothing to Do But Drink
- On the Ropes
- On Your Farm
- Open Country
- Painted Fabrics
- Poisoned Angel: the Story of Alma Rosé
- Public Records, Private Lives
- Questions, Questions
- Reel Histories
- The Reunion
- Short Cuts
- Soundtrack
- Subterranean Stories
- Thinking Allowed
- This Sceptred Isle (1995–1996, 1999, 2001, 2005–2006)
- Traveller's Tree
- Travels with my Anti-Semitism (1999), David Cohen
- Veg Talk
- Weekend Woman's Hour
- Winnie the Pooh Lost and Found
- Wireless Nights
- Woman's Hour (1946 Light Programme; 1973–), magazine program aimed at women
- Word of Mouth
- A World in Your Ear
- You and Yours (1970–)

== Conversations ==
- Chain Reaction, light-hearted interviews with each guest becoming the following week's host
- Genius, members of the public present ideas to make the world better
- In Conversation With, interviews, mainly with comedians
- Loose Ends (1986–)
- Midweek
- Never the Same Again (1986–95)
- Off The Page
- Ramblings (19 April 1998-) a walking chat show presented primarily by Clare Balding with the first series (April 1998-September 1999) being presented by Jeremy Jessel alongside other guest presenters in future series.
- Room 101, in which celebrities pick their most-hated things
- Start the Week
- Stop The Week (1974–1992)
- That Reminds Me, reminiscences from celebrities
- Where Are You Taking Us? (1973?)-1974? (also see Brian J. Ford (presenter))

== Miscellaneous ==
- After Eden
- After Happy Ever
- Listen with Mother (1950 Light Programme; 1973–82)
- Pick of the Week
- Radio 4 Appeal
- UK Theme (1973–2006)
- Saturday Live
- Shipping Forecast (1925 Daventry 5XX; 1929–39 National Programme; 1945 Light Programme; 1967 Radio 2; 1978–)
- Test Match Special (1956 Third Programme; 1967 Radio 3; 1994–)
- Weather Forecast (1922 London 2LO; 1925 Daventry 5XX; 1929–39 National Programme; 1945–)
