= African =

African may refer to anything from or pertaining to the continent of Africa.

African or Africans may refer to:

== Music ==
- The Africans (band)
- "African", a song from the 1977 album Equal Rights by Peter Tosh

== People ==
- African ethnicity, someone from the continent of Africa

== Writings ==
- The African (essay), a story by French author J. M. G. Le Clézio
- The African (Conton novel), a novel by William Farquhar Conton
- The African (Courlander novel), a novel by Harold Courlander

== Other uses ==
- The Africans (radio program)
- African Grant (born 1965), American former football player

== See also ==
- Africana (disambiguation)
- Africanus (disambiguation)
