= Asian Diasporas =

BBC radio programme

- Genre: Documentary
- Running time: 35-40 minutes
- Country of origin: United Kingdom
- Language(s): English
- Home station: BBC Radio 4
- Hosted by: Jatinder Verma
- Produced by: Allison Puranik
- Edited by: Maria Balinska
- Original release: 2007
- Website: BBC World Service Edition

Asian Diasporas is an intermittently-broadcast forty-minute BBC Radio 4 documentary programme about Asian communities around the world, first transmitted in 2007 with so far three episodes.

The programme has been introduced by Jatinder Verma, "himself a child of the diaspora", who was born in Dar es Salaam and grew up in Kenya and was the first Asian theatre director to direct a play at Britain's National Theatre.

Asian Diasporas broadcast history to date has consisted of Family, which looked at Japanese people in Latin America and elsewhere; Business, which examined Korean family business in the US; and Politics, which focused on Chinese dissident activists in the US and in Europe. All three themes were interwoven into each episode.

The series was produced by Allison Puranik and edited by Maria Balinska.

== Use in academia ==
Parts of the audio of the series have been used to teach English as a second language to students at The Hong Kong University.

The series was also featured as a primary source by James Hevia in a course about immigration at the University of North Carolina.

== See also ==
- List of BBC Radio 4 programmes
- The Africans
- Americana
- Woman's Hour
