= Why Worry =

Why Worry may refer to:

== Film and TV ==
- Why Worry?, a 1923 Harold Lloyd film

== Music ==
- Why Worry, a 1986 album by Nana Mouskouri

=== Songs ===
- "Why Worry?" (Clannad song), a 1991 single
- "Why Worry Blues" by Jack Prentice (words) and Bud Shepard, George Webb and Vic Sell (music) for the silent film Why Worry?
- "Why Worry", a 1951 song with words by John Sexton and music by Ralph Edwards, recorded by Billy Cotton Band
- "Why Worry", a 1952 song by the Andrews Sisters
- "Why Worry", a 1952 single by Eddie "Piano" Miller
- "Why Worry", a 1967 song by Aaron Neville Davis, Diamond
- "Why Worry", a 1973 single by the Africans
- "Why Worry", a 1977 single by Israel Vibration
- "Why Worry", a 1985 song by Dire Straits from the album Brothers in Arms
- "Why Worry", a song by Johnny Maddox And the Rhythmasters
- "Why Worry", a 2002 song by the All-American Rejects from the album The All-American Rejects
- "Why Worry", a 2020 song by Isaiah Rashad
