= List of Blackburn Rovers supporters =

A list of notable and famous Blackburn Rovers supporters.

- Gareth Ainsworth, former footballer and manager
- Gary Aspden, fashion designer
- Faris Badwan, musician, vocalist in The Horrors
- Bill Beaumont, former rugby union player
- Jim Bowen, former actor, presenter, and comedian
- Bradley Brooks, darts player
- Adam Catterall, presenter
- Ronnie Clayton, former footballer for Blackburn Rovers
- John Charles, artist
- Lewis Costello, comedian
- Nick Dougherty, former golfer
- Bryan Douglas, former footballer for Blackburn Rovers
- David Dunn, former footballer for Blackburn Rovers
- Mickey Ellison, boxer
- Tim Farron, Liberal Democrat MP for Westmorland and Lonsdale since 2005 and Leader of the Liberal Democrats from 2015 to 2017
- Frank Fielding, former footballer for Blackburn Rovers
- Carl Fogarty, former motorcycle racer
- Simon Garner, former footballer for Blackburn Rovers
- Wayne Hemingway, fashion designer
- Alfie Holden, social media influencer
- Tez Ilyas, stand-up comedian
- Mark Jeffers, boxer
- Phil Jones, former footballer for Blackburn Rovers
- Matty Litherland, footballer for Blackburn Rovers
- Graham Liver, radio presenter
- Liam Livingstone, cricketer
- Lee Mack, actor, presenter, and comedian
- Connor Mahoney, former footballer for Blackburn Rovers
- Nicky McCallan, musician, songwriter
- Scott Michaels, businessman
- Shawn Michaels, professional wrestler
- AJ Odudu, presenter
- Steve Pemberton, actor and comedian, known for being a member of The League of Gentlemen from 1999 to 2002 and playing Mick Garvey in Benidorm from 2007 to 2015
- Anthony Pilkington, former footballer for Blackburn Rovers
- Steven Pinder, actor
- Matt Smith, actor, known for playing the Eleventh Doctor in Doctor Who from 2010 to 2013 and Daemon Targaryen in House of the Dragon since 2022
- Jack Straw, Labour MP for Blackburn from 1979 to 2015
- Dennis Taylor, former snooker player
- Harold Varner III, golfer
- Jack Walker, former businessman, who owned Blackburn Rovers from 1991 to 2000
- Adam Wharton, footballer for Crystal Palace since signing from Blackburn Rovers in February 2024
- Scott Wharton, footballer for Blackburn Rovers
- Shane Williams, former rugby union player
