= The Mark Steel Solution =

British radio show

- Country of origin: United Kingdom
- Language(s): English
- Home station: BBC Radio 4
- Hosted by: Mark Steel
- Starring: Pete Sinclair; Maria McErlane; Kim Wall
- Written by: Mark Steel; Pete Sinclair
- Produced by: Phil Clark
- Original release: 9 October 1992

The Mark Steel Solution is a series of scripted radio lectures by Mark Steel made for broadcast on BBC Radio. The show began in 1992. Each episode presents persuasive, yet witty, arguments for a seemingly bizarre solution to a contemporary social problem by highlighting the flaws in the present system. The show's original slogan was "Give me thirty minutes and I’ll convince you of anything!"

The first series was broadcast on BBC Radio 5, before three series were broadcast on BBC Radio 4. As of 2024, old episodes are broadcast on Radio 4 Extra. Many of the arguments are illustrated by miniature sketches, featuring Mark Steel, Pete Sinclair, Maria McErlane, and Kim Wall. It was produced by Phil Clark, and was written by Mark Steel and Pete Sinclair.

== Episode list (incomplete) ==
Series 1, 1992 (BBC Radio 5)

- S01 E01 - The Royal Family - "The Royal Family should be chosen by weekly lottery" (9 October 1992)
- S01 E02 - The Family - "Nobody should be allowed to live in the same family for more than a year" (16 October 1992)
- S01 E03 - Judges - "Criminals should be recruited as high courts judges" (23 October 1992)
- S01 E04 - School - "Nobody should go to school until they're 35" (30 October 1992)
- S01 E05 - England - "Anyone born in England should be deported" (6 November 1992)
- S01 E06 - The Economy - "All government economic policy should be decided by sport" (13 November 1992)

Series 2, 1994 (BBC Radio 4)

- S02 E01 - Unemployment - "Having a job should be illegal" (15 July 1994)
- S02 E02 - Transport - "Transport should only be paid for by people who don't use it" (22 July 1994)
- S02 E03 - Housing - "Everyone in Britain should be rehoused at random" (29 July 1994)
- S02 E04 - The Royal Family - "The Royal Family should be chosen by weekly lottery" (paraphrasing S01 E01) (presumably 5 August 1994)

Series 3, 1995 (BBC Radio 4)

- S03 E01 - Sexuality - "Everyone should have to be gay for two years"
- S03 E02 - Charity - "Anybody who gives to charity should be jailed"
- S03 E03 - Crime - "Criminals should decide their own punishment" (Uses some sketches from S01 E03)
- S03 E04 - Immigration - "Anyone born in England should be deported" (paraphrasing S01 E05)

Series 4, August and September 1996 (BBC Radio 4)

- S04 E01 - Religion - "People should have to change their religion every Monday"
- S04 E02 - Media - "Anyone in charge of the media should be sacked after thirty minutes"
- S04 E03 - Education - "Nobody should go to school until they are 36" (paraphrasing S01 E04)
- S04 E04 - Life - "Pessimists should be persecuted by law"

== See also ==
- The Mark Steel Lectures
- The Mark Steel Revolution
- Mark Steel's in Town
