= Do Nothing 'Til You Hear from Me (radio programme) =

- Genre: Sitcom
- Running time: 30 minutes
- Country of origin: United Kingdom
- Language: English
- Home station: BBC Radio 4
- Starring: Ram John Holder; Don Warrington; Sam Kelly; George Layton; Yvonne Brewster; Caroline Lee Johnson; Marcus Powell
- Created by: Marcus Powell
- Written by: Marcus Powell; John Byrne
- Produced by: Carol Smith
- Recording studio: The Drill Hall, London
- Original release: September 30, 2003 – July 15, 2005
- No. of series: 2
- No. of episodes: 10
- Website: www.bbc.co.uk/programmes/b01rqm37

Do Nothing 'Til You Hear From Me was BBC Radio 4 sitcom originally broadcast in 2003 and 2005 in two series, written Marcus Powell and John Byrne. The series took Powell's cantankerous Jamaican stand-up comedian Roy Diamond and transformed him into an equally cantankerous trombone player, Roy Walcott, played by Ram John Holder (series 1) and Don Warrington (series 2). The supporting cast included Sam Kelly, George Layton, Yvonne Brewster, Caroline Lee Johnson and Powell himself playing Roy's long-suffering son-in-law Victor.

Guest stars included Gerald Harper, Melvyn Hayes and Gemma Craven. The show was recorded at London's Drill Hall complete with live trombonist. It was produced by Carol Smith.

== Episodes ==
=== Series 1 (2003) ===
No.	Title	Original release date
1	"Body and Soul"	30 September 2003
2	"Let's Face the Music"	7 October 2003
3	"The Folks Who Live on the Hill"	14 October 2003
4	"Round Midnight"	21 October 2003
5	"I Could Write a Book"	28 October 2003
6	"She's Funny That Way"	4 November 2003

=== Series 2 (2005) ===
No.	Title	Original release date
1	"Lulu's Back in Town"	24 June 2005
2	"I Get Along Without You Very Well"	1 July 2005
3	"Swingin' Down the Lane"	8 July 2005
4	"Thanks for the Memory"	15 July 2005
