= Mark Steel's in Town =

Radio comedy show

- Image from the downloadable version of the first series of Mark Steel's in Town.
- Genre: Stand-up comedy
- Running time: 30 minutes
- Country of origin: United Kingdom
- Language: English
- Home station: BBC Radio 4
- Starring: Mark Steel
- Written by: Mark Steel; Pete Sinclair
- Produced by: Julia McKenzie (Series 1–2); Sam Bryant (Series 3–4); Ed Morrish (Series 5); Carl Cooper (Series 6–present)
- Original release: 18 March 2009 – present
- No. of series: 13 + 1 special
- No. of episodes: 73
- Opening theme: "Eat My Goal" by Collapsed Lung (Series 1–3) "Rock This Town" by Stray Cats (Series 4–)

Mark Steel's in Town is a stand-up comedy show on BBC Radio 4, co-written and performed by Mark Steel. The series, which was first broadcast on 18 March 2009, is recorded in various towns and cities in the United Kingdom and occasionally elsewhere. Each episode is tailored to the town in which it is recorded, and the show is performed in front of a local audience.

The programme received positive reviews from critics because of Steel's observations of the locals, and because the series took place in multiple locations, compared to the majority of stand-up shows on radio and television, which are normally recorded in a single location. In 2010, Mark Steel's in Town won a Silver Award for "Best Comedy" in the Sony Radio Academy Awards, and two years later won the Gold Award in the same category. Also in 2010, the show won the Writers' Guild of Great Britain Award for "Best Radio Comedy / Light Entertainment". The series was voted "Best Radio Entertainment Show" in the Comedy.co.uk Awards held by the British Comedy Guide in 2012 and 2015.

== Format ==
Steel in Kirkwall, Orkney, standing under a warning sign telling road users to look out for otters.

Before each episode, Steel researches the history of the place in which he is going to perform. His research interests include local notable people, landmarks, customs and humorous anecdotes. The majority of the research sometimes took place close to the actual recording date. For example, Steel carried out almost no research for his episode in Walsall until ten days before the recording. In Merthyr Tydfil he spent three days in the town, where he carried out research and met locals. He then performs a tailor-made show about the town in front of a local audience. The style of the programme is similar to other shows starring Steel, such as The Mark Steel Lectures, in which Steel presented a humorous lecture about a famous person in history.

== Production ==
Due to the small budget, there were certain places the show could not be recorded during the first series. For example, no episodes in the first series were recorded in Scotland. Steel said in an interview:

"One of the restrictions we've got is that the budget for radio we've got going is so unbelievably, comically tiny, that we couldn't go to Scotland because the fare is too much. It is like some student fanzine. "Mum, can I borrow some money because I want to go to Scotland."

"So, I'm hoping, if we do another series, because I'd love to go to the Shetlands. I'd be really excited at going to the Shetlands. Because it is just like a fascinating place to be at the moment. Or even one of these sort of weird places in Cornwall. But that was too far as well."

The second series did feature two episodes recorded in Scotland: one in Dumfries, on the Scottish border, and one in Kirkwall, Orkney.

Other than Steel, Pete Sinclair was the only other writer, providing additional material. Julia McKenzie produced the first two series, while Sam Bryant produced series 3 and 4. Ed Morrish produced Series 5; Carl Cooper produced series 6 to 9. Also working on the show were studio manager Jerry Peal and production co-ordinators Sarah Sharpe, Trudi Stephens, Hayley Sterling and Beverly Tagg.

== Reception ==
The majority of the reaction towards Mark Steel's in Town has been positive. In May 2010, the programme was given the Silver Award for "Best Comedy" in the Sony Radio Academy Awards. In May 2012, it won the Gold Award in the same category. In November 2010 it won the Writers' Guild of Great Britain Award for "Best Radio Comedy / Light Entertainment". In January 2013, it won the "Best Radio Entertainment Show" award in the 2012 Comedy.co.uk Awards held by the British Comedy Guide. It won the same award in 2015.

Chris Campling in The Times wrote a review of a show recorded in Skipton: "A tough gig? More like shooting fish in a barrel, to judge from the reception he received from the honest burghers of Skipton, North Yorkshire. From the moment he remarked on the fact that the hall in which he was performing was used as a cattle market during the day and was hosed out before the show – and got a roar of approving laughter – Steel must have known that he could do no wrong."

"This programme is stand-up comedy at its very best. Stand-up on radio is immensely challenging – and often unsuccessful – but this programme is intelligent and rich in content, well paced and, moreover, funny. Although it is clear that a lot of preparation went into making this programme, the result is fluent, natural and exciting. It was also generous to its audience and to its location – and very much in tune with the sound and appeal of the network."

— The Sony Radio Academy Awards

Campling and other critics have commented that one of the main features of the show is the ability of the locals to laugh at themselves and their eccentricities. Campling wrote of the Skipton show: "The ability to laugh at itself is one of this country's finest attributes, but the Skipton mob were only too happy to celebrate their insularity." Elisabeth Mahoney of The Guardian, who reviewed the Dartford episode, said: "Going to a place and insulting it takes guts and careful strategies. Steel made use of the fact that he is from nearby Swanley, both to signal that he knows the area but also that – whatever he was about to say about Dartford – it was better than his hometown." Another journalist, reviewing the Penzance episode in the North Devon Journal commented: "Why do we like programmes that laugh at us? Because, I hope, we laugh at ourselves. We're not ignorant of our stereotypes. West Cornwall? Aaarrrrr!"

Miranda Sawyer in The Observer also praised the show saying it was, "A simple idea, kindly and wittily executed by another unfashionably humane Englishman. Thank Gaia they still exist."

Hilda Swinney, the Portland correspondent for the Dorset Echo, said that at the recording on the Isle of Portland: "The audience, mostly Portlanders, were appreciative and very responsive to his humour and his views on 'their special island'. They left him in no doubt that a return of Mark Steel's in Town would be very welcome."

Stuart Morris, a historian who helped to provide research for Steel for the Portland show, commented: "I was amazed that he should have absorbed so much of the island's history in the short period of time that he had. He joked about the Portland winds, saying that in comparison, islanders wouldn't even have bothered to take out their kites in the face of Hurricane Katrina. He made a few remarks about Portland/Weymouth rivalry and our Weymouth friends present laughed as much as the rest of us."

Ian Wolf from the British Comedy Guide commented that: "The fact that the series moved from town to town was very impressive – as it meant Steel had to write a unique half-hour routine for each venue (compare this to most stand-ups, who only have to come up with about an hour of strong material a year!)."

== Episodes ==
Locations visited in Mark Steel's in Town (not shown: Gibraltar, Malta, Paris)

=== Series 1 ===
No. in series	Title	Original release date
1–1	"Skipton"	18 March 2009
Recorded at the Mart Theatre, which also acts as a livestock auction hall, Steel visits Skipton, North Yorkshire, in which he talks about the local canals, cattle and Skipton Castle.
1–2	"Boston"	25 March 2009
Recorded at the Blackfriars Arts Centre, Steel visits Boston, Lincolnshire, and discusses the town's love of Brussels sprouts, its links with Puritanism and the story of the Boston Stump.
1–3	"Lewes"	1 April 2009
Recorded at the All Saints Centre, Steel visits Lewes, East Sussex, and chats about its bonfires, its history of pub fights and the local stroppiness.
1–4	"Walsall"	8 April 2009
Recorded at the local town hall, Steel visits Walsall, West Midlands, and brings up the subject of the local anarchists who were framed by the police, a concrete statue of a hippo and how Walsall has nothing whatsoever to do with Birmingham.
1–5	"Merthyr Tydfil"	15 April 2009
Recorded at the Myfanwy Theatre, Steel visits Merthyr Tydfil, South Wales, and looks at the Merthyr Rising, the boxers and the Welsh roots of Donny Osmond.
1–6	"Portland"	22 April 2009
Recorded at the Portland Spa Hotel and Conference Centre, Steel visits the Isle of Portland, Dorset, and chats about the history of Portland stone, its military history, and the local hatred of a certain fluffy animal beginning with "R".

=== Series 2 ===
No. in series	Title	Original release date
2–1	"Dartford"	7 April 2010
Recorded at The Mick Jagger Centre, Steel performs in Dartford in his home county of Kent, discussing the Peasants' Revolt, gypsy tart, and what one resident calls the "Road To Hell".
2–2	"Wilmslow"	14 April 2010
Recorded at the Green Room Theatre, Steel performs in Wilmslow, Cheshire, where he talks about footballers' mansions, 3D eyelashes and the rhyming Wizard of Alderley Edge.
2–3	"Dumfries"	21 April 2010
Recorded at the Theatre Royal, Steel performs in Dumfries, on the Scottish border, where Steel looks at the town's hatred of seagulls and love of Robert Burns.
2–4	"Penzance"	28 April 2010
Recorded at the Acorn Arts Centre, Steel performs in Penzance, Cornwall, where he looks at the town's remoteness and pasties, as well as the Newlyn fish riots and an unusual civil war concerning a ferry terminal.
2–5	"Gateshead"	5 May 2010
Recorded at the Old Town Hall, Steel performs in Gateshead, Tyne and Wear, in which he talks about the local art, a famous car park, and how the town is definitely not Newcastle.
2–6	"Kirkwall"	12 May 2010
Recorded at The Pickaquoy Centre, Steel performs in Kirkwall, the capital of Orkney, where he talks about a violent ball game, Thorfinn The Skullsplitter and why the weather makes it pointless being a hairdresser on the archipelago.

=== Series 3 ===
No. in series	Title	Original release date
3–1	"Berwick-Upon-Tweed"	6 December 2011
Recorded at The Maltings Theatre & Cinema in Berwick-Upon-Tweed, Northumberland, Steel talks about the town's war with Russia, its Scottish rivalries and local slang.
3–2	"Holyhead"	13 December 2011
Recorded at the Canolfan Ucheldre Centre in Holyhead, Anglesey, Steel talks about ferries, foot nibbling and Kate and Wills.
3–3	"Basingstoke"	20 December 2011
Recorded at The Haymarket in Basingstoke, Hampshire, where he talks about prehistoric roundabouts and a rather unusual world record set in a shopping centre.
3–4	"Douglas (Isle of Man)"	27 December 2011
Recorded at the Villa Marina & Gaiety Theatre in Douglas, Isle of Man, where he talks about space travel, fairy bridges and the mystery of Gef the Talking Mongoose.
3–5	"Bungay"	3 January 2012
Recorded at The Fisher Centre in Bungay, Suffolk, where he talks about non-existent castles, haunted pubs and chicken roundabouts.
3–6	"Wigan"	10 January 2012
Recorded at The Orwell in Wigan, Greater Manchester, where he talks about entering pie eating competitions, living under floorboards, and the radicalism of George Formby.
Edinburgh Fringe Special
3–7	"Leith"	21 August 2012
Recorded at the BBC's venue at Potterow, Edinburgh, Steel devotes to an episode to the city's district of Leith, where he talks about port workers, pub fights and a hatred of trams.

=== Series 4 ===
No. in series	Title	Original release date
4–1	"Whitehaven"	28 November 2012
Recorded at the Rosehill Theatre in Whitehaven, Cumbria.
4–2	"Tobermory"	5 December 2012
Recorded at the Mull Theatre in Tobermory, the Isle of Mull, the Inner Hebrides.
4–3	"Handsworth"	12 December 2012
Recorded at the Drum Centre, Handsworth, Birmingham.
4–4	"Ottery St Mary"	19 December 2012
Recorded at King's School, Ottery St Mary, Devon.
4–5	"Corby"	26 December 2012
Recorded at The Corby Cube, Corby, Northamptonshire.
4–6	"Chipping Norton"	2 January 2013
Recorded at The Theatre, Chipping Norton, Oxfordshire.

=== Series 5 ===
No. in series	Title	Original release date
5–1	"Glastonbury"	8 January 2014
Steel visits Glastonbury to talk about the legend of King Arthur, visits the only two chain shops on the High Street, and makes a crucial mistake involving cider.
5–2	"Derry"	15 January 2014
Steel's problems start with deciding which name to actually use, and reflects on the town being named the City of Culture.
5–3	"St Davids"	22 January 2014
Steel is in the smallest city in Britain, where the locals are sometimes very rude but sometimes almost too friendly.
5–4	"Southall"	29 January 2014
Steel visits the part of London also known as "Little India", visiting and eating at the local Sikh temple, and meets an astrologer with a terrible cold.
5–5	"Birkenhead"	5 February 2014
Steel talks about Tranmere Rovers, the band Half Man Half Biscuit, and visits a pub which is inside a barbers.
5–6	"Huddersfield"	12 February 2014
Steel comes to the town which is the historical home of rugby league, the Luddites and Last of the Summer Wine.

=== Series 6 ===
No. in series	Title	Original release date
6–1	"Fleetwood"	19 May 2015
Steel performs from the Marine Hall in Fleetwood, Lancashire.
6–2	"Melton Mowbray"	26 May 2015
Steel performs from the Melton Theatre in Melton Mowbray, Leicestershire.
6–3	"Shrewsbury"	2 June 2015
Steel performs from the Theatre Severn in Shrewsbury, Shropshire.
6–4	"Barnard Castle"	9 June 2015
Steel performs from The Witham in Barnard Castle, County Durham.
6–5	"Paisley"	16 June 2015
Steel performs from Spires Drama Studios in Paisley, Renfrewshire.
6–6	"Saint Anne"	23 June 2015
Steel performs from The Island Hall in Saint Anne, capital of Alderney in the Channel Islands.

=== Series 7 ===
No. in series	Title	Original release date
7–1	"Stockport"	7 September 2016
Steel performs at the Garrick Theatre in Stockport, Greater Manchester.
7–2	"Colchester"	14 September 2016
Steel performs in Colchester, Essex, the first town in Britain - then Boudicca burnt it to the ground.
7–3	"Hebden Bridge"	21 September 2016
Steel performs at the Trades Club in Hebden Bridge, West Yorkshire.
7–4	"Kingston-on-Thames"	28 September 2016
Steel performs in the Royal Borough of Kingston Upon Thames, south-west London.
7–5	"Lynton"	5 October 2016
Steel performs in Lynton, Devon.
7–6	"Gibraltar"	12 October 2016
Steel performs in St. Michael's Cave inside the Rock of Gibraltar.

=== Series 8 ===
No. in series	Title	Original release date
8–1	"Bedford"	5 December 2017
8–2	"Matlock Bath"	12 December 2017
8–3	"Inverness"	19 December 2017
8–4	"Portishead, Somerset"	26 December 2017
8–5	"Kingston upon Hull"	2 January 2018
8–6	"Ventnor"	9 January 2018

=== Series 9 ===
No. in series	Title	Original release date
9–1	"Hastings"	17 January 2019
Steel visits Hastings in East Sussex and performs for the locals.
9–2	"Kings Lynn"	24 January 2019
Steel visits the Norfolk town of King's Lynn and performs a bespoke comedy show for the local residents.
9–3	"Carlisle"	31 January 2019
Steel visits Carlisle in Cumbria and performs a bespoke comedy show for the local residents.
9–4	"Aberystwyth"	7 February 2019
Steel visits Aberystwyth in Ceredigion, Wales, and performs a bespoke comedy show for the local residents.
9–5	"The Forest of Dean"	14 February 2019
Steel visits the Forest of Dean and performs a bespoke comedy show for the local residents at the historic Speech House located between Coleford and Cinderford.
9–6	"Malta"	21 February 2019
Steel visits Malta and performs a bespoke comedy show for the local residents.

=== Series 10 ===
No. in series	Title	Original release date
10–1	"Brighton"	12 November 2020
10–2	"Stratford-upon-Avon"	19 November 2020
10–3	"Online"	26 November 2020

=== Series 11 ===
No. in series	Title	Original release date
11–1	"Blyth"	1 December 2021
11–2	"Walthamstow"	8 December 2021
11–3	"Whitby"	15 December 2021

=== Series 12 ===
No. in series	Title	Original release date
12–1	"Nottingham"	22 August 2022
12–2	"Tring"	29 August 2022
12–3	"The Isles of Scilly"	5 September 2022
12–4	"Salisbury"	12 September 2022
12–5	"Newport"	21 September 2022
12–6	"Paris"	26 September 2022
This episode was also broadcast in French.

=== Series 13 ===
No. in series	Title	Original release date
13–1	"Margate"	24 June 2024
13–2	"Malvern"	1 July 2024
13–3	"East Grinstead"	8 July 2024
13–4	"Stoke-on-Trent"	15 July 2024
13–5	"Nether Edge, Sheffield"	22 July 2024
13–6	"Coleraine"	29 July 2024

=== Series 14 ===
No. in series	Title	Original release date
14–1	"Oakham"	7 October 2025
14–2	"Wrexham"	14 October 2025
14–3	"Lewisham"	21 October 2025
14–4	"Cambridge"	28 October 2025
14–5	"Lerwick (Shetland part 1)"	4 November 2025
14–6	"Unst (Shetland part 2)"	11 November 2025

== Merchandise ==
The first series of Mark Steel's in Town was released for download on 1 March 2010. The series has yet to be released on CD. However, all 11 series can be streamed free on the BBC Sounds website.

A book accompanying the series was published by Fourth Estate on 27 October 2011.

== See also ==
- The Mark Steel Solution
- The Mark Steel Revolution
