= Mark Steel =

English comedian (born 1960)

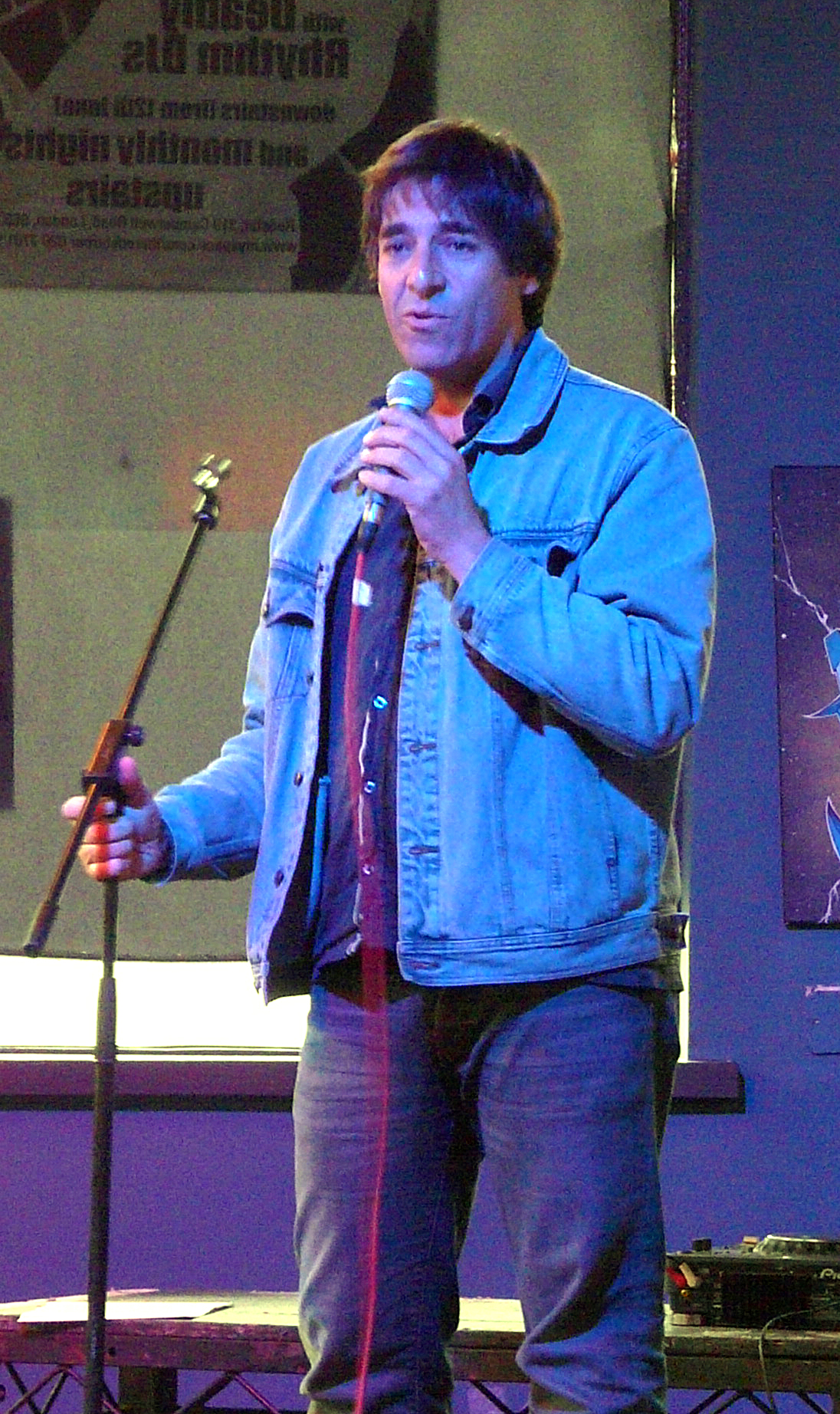
- Steel in 2008
- Born: 4 July 1960 (age 66); Swanley, Kent, England
- Notable work: The Mark Steel Lectures; The Mark Steel Revolution; The Mark Steel Solution; Mark Steel's in Town
- Children: 2, including Elliot

Comedy career
- Years active: 1983–present
- Medium: Radio, stand-up, television
- Website: marksteelinfo.com

Mark Steel (born 4 July 1960) is an English author, broadcaster, stand-up comedian and newspaper columnist. He has made many appearances on radio and television shows as a guest panellist, and has written regular columns in The Guardian, The Independent and Daily Mirror. He presents The Mark Steel Lectures, The Mark Steel Solution, Mark Steel's in Town and the podcast What the Fuck Is Going On?

== Early life ==
Steel was born in Swanley, Kent. He was adopted 10 days after he was born. His adoptive father worked in insurance and his mother was a housewife who supplemented the family's income through factory work and working as a lollipop lady. He had a close relationship with his adoptive parents. Steel told The Guardian':

I knew I was adopted, strangely, before I knew where babies came from. I didn't feel different or special, and I don't ever remember giving the slightest damn about it. I knew because my very lovely auntie Gwen would tell the story of how she got talking to a blonde girl, Frances, who had moved into a flat in the same house in London. She was 19. She was in a bit of a state because she was pregnant. Her parents didn't know and she'd run away from home. It was 1959, so this wasn't easy to deal with. So my auntie Gwen said to her, 'Well, I've got a solution. Have the baby and give it to my brother.' So this girl had me in 1960 and I was handed over to Doreen and Ernie.

He grew up in Swanley, Kent, and claims he was expelled from school for attending a cricket course without permission: "I thought, fantastic! The punishment for not coming in is that I'm not allowed to come in." He traced his biological mother later in life but she said that she did not want to know him, and died soon after. He learned that she was from a Scottish working-class family with an active involvement in left-wing politics; she had married an Italian and lived in Rimini. She had met his biological father Joe Dwek at a party in London.

Dwek was an Egyptian Sephardic Jew whose family left Egypt after Gamal Abdel Nasser became president in the 1950s. Dwek had subsequently become a multi-millionaire trader on Wall Street as well as a professional backgammon player who won tournaments in the US and Europe, and represented the UK against the US in 1973 and 1974. After writing and emailing, Steel met Dwek only once, in a London restaurant sometime around 2006. In 2015, Steel told The Guardian:

Members of the royal family used to visit Dwek's house in London and he hung out with millionaires, like John Aspinall and James Goldsmith, at the Clermont Club ... Just last night I discovered that five years ago he bought a house for $12m. […] He said he remembered Frances vividly but it [Steel getting in touch by email] was all a bit of a shock because he had made all the arrangements to have me dispensed with. But she took the money and didn't go through with it, bless her.

In the late 1970s his adoptive father suffered a mental breakdown and was placed into care at Stone House Hospital. Steel says that his first encounter with social injustice was when he saw how mentally ill patients were being treated in that hospital. The shabby conditions reinforced Steel's political beliefs.

Steel documented his early life, adoption and quest to find his birth parents in an audio book for Audible Productions Who Do I Think I Am? – which was released in December 2021.

== Career ==
Steel had various early jobs including a stint as a milkman. He became bored with answering how he started in comedy and took to saying the first thing that came into his head. He worked the comedy circuit for several years, and acknowledges Alexei Sayle as an influence. In 1992 Steel presented the satirical radio show The Mark Steel Solution on BBC Radio 5, consisting of half-hour monologues offering solutions to social problems. It ran to four series. A comic autobiography, It's Not a Runner Bean, was published in 1996 which led to a column in The Guardian between 1996 and 1999. In 2000 he started writing the Thursday Opinion Column for The Independent.

He has appeared frequently on Have I Got News For You, Room 101, Mock the Week, the Graham Norton Show, and has made several appearances on Question Time. Mark Steel's in Town has won a Sony Award, Writers' Guild Award, Chortle Awards and British Comedy Guide Awards. In 2014 he won the British Press Award for Broadsheet Columnist for his column in The Independent.

He has written and performed several radio and television series for the BBC, and written several books including his autobiography Reasons to Be Cheerful, Vive la Révolution – an account of the French Revolution – and It's Not a Runner Bean.

In 2015 he toured a show, Who Do I Think I Am, about his adoption and tracing his biological parents. It was broadcast as a show on BBC Radio 4.

In 2017, Steel was back on stage with his show Every Little Thing's Gonna Be Alright.

== Personal life ==
Steel has two children from a relationship that ended in 2006: a son, Elliot Steel, who is also a stand-up comedian, and a daughter. He was then married to Natasha Steel until 2016. He was in a relationship with fellow comedian Shaparak Khorsandi and described their relationship as "always entwined".

In October 2023, Steel said that he was undergoing surgery after a diagnosis of throat cancer. In May 2024 he spoke of his "immense relief" after being given the all-clear from doctors, praising the staff at University College London Hospital.

During the South Africa series in 2008 he was interviewed by Jonathan Agnew on Test Match Special about his love of cricket.

In December 2024, Steel was the castaway for BBC Radio 4's Desert Island Discs. His musical choices included "Janie Jones" by The Clash, "My Boy Lollipop" by Millie Small and "Killing in the Name" by Rage Against the Machine. He also chose the Nick Cave song "Into My Arms" and dedicated it to Khorsandi. His favourite track was "Love Me or Leave Me" by Nina Simone.

== Politics ==
During the premiership of Margaret Thatcher, when he was in his 20s, Steel vented his objections to what he perceived as society's injustices via political protests, punk rock, and poetry.

Viewing the Soviet Union as a state capitalist system rather than truly socialist, Steel joined the Socialist Workers Party (SWP). He was present in Southall in 1979 during the riot in which Blair Peach was killed.

In 2000, Steel took part in the London Assembly elections on behalf of the London Socialist Alliance (part of the Socialist Alliance) in the Croydon and Sutton constituency; he received 1,823 votes (1.5% of the vote).

At the 2010 UK General Election Steel co-hosted a fundraiser entitled "Laugh! I nearly voted" with Joe Lycett, Lewis Costello and Matt Green in support of left-wing candidates at the Dancehouse theatre in Manchester. Proceeds went to the respective campaigns of Gayle O'Donovan of the Green Party of England and Wales in Manchester Central, David Joseph Henry, the Trade Unionist and Socialist Coalition candidate for Salford and Eccles and Kay Philips of the Respect Party in Blackley and Broughton.

In February 2013, Steel was among those who supported the People's Assembly in a letter published in The Guardian. He spoke at a press conference to launch the People's Assembly Against Austerity on 26 March 2013, and at regional public meetings in the lead up to a national meeting at Westminster Central Hall on 22 June 2013. He also gave a speech at the People's Assembly Conference in Westminster.

Prior to the 2015 UK general election, he endorsed the parliamentary candidacy of the Green Party's Caroline Lucas.

== Radio and television ==
=== Radio ===
- The Mark Steel Solution (1992, 1994–1996) BBC Radio 5, BBC Radio 4.
- The Mark Steel Revolution (1998) BBC Radio 4, (2007).
- The Mark Steel Lectures (1999–2002) BBC Radio 4, (2007)
- Dedicated Troublemaker (2004) BBC Radio 4
- Mark Steel's in Town (2009–present) BBC Radio 4
- What the Fuck is Going On? (2021–present) Acast
- The People vs McDonald's (2025) BBC Radio 4 Shadow World

He has also contributed to or appeared on the following shows:

- The Good Human Guide BBC Radio 2(1985). Contributing writer.
- Extra Time BBC Radio 5. Presenter. Sports programme.
- Late Edition BBC Radio 4 (1995). Regular panellist on this satirical talk show.
- The News Quiz BBC Radio 4 several occasions from the late 1990s onwards. Guest panellist.
- Loose Ends BBC Radio 4. Interviewee.
- Midweek BBC Radio 4. Interviewee.
- Excess Baggage BBC Radio 4. Interviewee.
- Test Match Special BBC Radio 4. Lunchtime interviewee, 1 August 2008 – England vs South Africa, 3rd test, Edgbaston.
- I've Never Seen Star Wars BBC Radio 4 (2008). Interviewee
- Heresy BBC Radio 4, Guest Panelist (2009)
- Unite BBC Radio 4, cowriter and actor

=== Television ===
- The Mark Steel Lectures BBC Four (2003, 2004, 2006). Writer and Presenter. Television version of his radio programme of the same title. Produced in association with The Open University.

He also appeared in the following shows:

- Red Dwarf BBC Two (1989). Playing 'Ski-man' in episode "Timeslides" (non-speaking part).
- Loose Talk (1994). Guest.
- The Late Jonathan Ross (1996). Guest.
- Does China Exist? (1997).
- If I Ruled the World BBC Two (1998). Guest panellist.
- Lamarr's Attacks BBC Two (2000). Guest.
- Never Mind the Buzzcocks BBC Two (2000–2001). Guest panellist.
- Have I Got News for You BBC One (2001–2020). Guest panellist.
- Question Time BBC One (2003, 2005, 2012, 2013). Guest panellist.
- QI BBC Two, BBC Four (2004–2006, 2022). Guest panellist.
- Mock the Week, [BBC Two (2005–2006). Guest panellist.
- Room 101 BBC Two, (2006). Guest.
- The Detectives, (1993–1997). Constable Pike.

== Bibliography ==
- Printed
  - The Leopard in my House: One Man’s Adventures in Cancerland (2025) ISBN 978-1529941029 The Authour's experience of being diagnosed with cancer.
  - Mark Steel's in Town (2011) ISBN 978-0007412426 Based on award-winning BBC Radio 4 series, a celebration of the quirks of small-town life in a country of increasingly homogenised high streets.
  - What's Going On? The Meanderings of a Comic Mind in Confusion (2008) ISBN 1-84737-281-3 Autobiography charting changes to his own personal life and the politics of the left.
  - Vive La Revolution (2003) ISBN 0-7432-0805-6, (2004) ISBN 0-7432-0806-4 History of the French Revolution.
  - Reasons to Be Cheerful (2001) ISBN 0-7432-0803-X, (2002) ISBN 0-7432-0804-8 Autobiography concentrating on political activism.
  - It's Not a Runner Bean (1996) ISBN 1-899344-12-8, (2004) ISBN 1-904316-43-3 Autobiography concentrating on his comedy career.
- Audiobooks
  - Reasons to Be Cheerful: From Punk to New Labour Through the Eyes of a Dedicated Troublemaker (2001) cassette ISBN 0-7435-0062-8
  - Who do I think I am? – Audible Productions (2021)

== See also ==
- List of newspaper columnists
