= Elliot Steel =

British stand-up comedian and comedy writer

- Born: August 16, 1996 (age 29)
- Parent: Mark Steel

Comedy career
- Years active: c. 2011-present
- Medium: Stand-up
- Website: Elliot on Instagram

Elliot Steel is a British stand-up comedian and comedy writer.

== Biography ==
Steel started performing stand-up at age 16 and performed at Latitude and Reading Festivals in 2013. Steel has performed several stand-up comedy shows at the Edinburgh Fringe since 2015. He has also performed sets at the Comedy Store in London, Hot Water Comedy Club, Top Secret Comedy Club and others. He has appeared on Comedy Central's Roast Battle and voiced Ashley on BBC Radio 4's programme Unite with his father, Mark Steel. He co-wrote Unite with Ivo Graham, Mark Steel and Barry Castagnola. Steel has appeared on BBC Radio 1’s Comedy Lounge and BBC Radio 4.

He is the son of comedian Mark Steel.
