= Asian diaspora =

Diaspora of people with Asian heritage

Map of Asia

The Asian diaspora is the diasporic group of Asian people who live outside of the continent. There are several prominent groups within the Asian diaspora.

Asian diasporas have been noted for having an increasingly transnational relationship with their ancestral homelands, especially culturally through the use of digital media.

== History ==
Asians have a long history of migrating internally within Asia. Overland trading routes such as the Silk Road, and maritime routes through the Indo-Pacific enabled ancient exchanges. Since the late 19th century, Asian migration has greatly increased because of the impacts of colonialism and globalisation, which enabled new types of migration; for example, European empires' global reach and consolidation paved the way for the Indian indenture system. Increasing border enforcement by modern nation-states has stymied traditional migration flows, however.

== Central Asian diaspora ==
The Central Asian diaspora of the modern era is shaped to a significant extent by the expansion of and displacement caused by the Soviet Union.

== East Asian diaspora ==
Young people have started migrating from East Asia in much larger numbers since the 1990s.

=== Chinese diaspora ===
An Overseas Chinese person is a person of Chinese ancestry or is a person of full or partial Chinese origin who traces his or her ancestry back to the Greater China but are living and working outside of Greater China (mainland China, Hong Kong, Macau, and Taiwan). This term generally applies to both people of Chinese ancestry and citizens abroad.

As of 2011, there were over 40.3 million overseas Chinese. As of 2023, there were 10.5 million people living outside mainland China who were born in mainland China, corresponding to 0.7 percent of China's population. Overall, China has a low percent of its population living overseas.

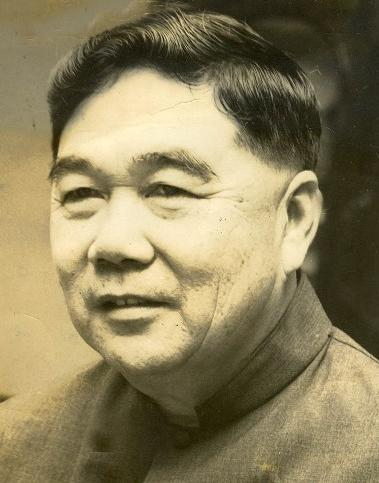
Guyana President Arthur Chung was the first ethnic Chinese President of Guyana.

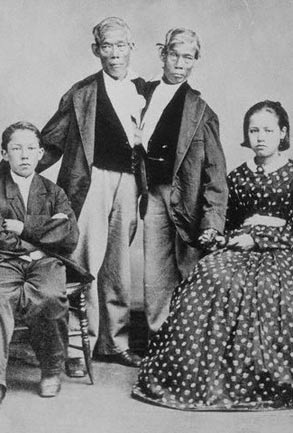
The Bunker brothers are Chinese origin conjoined twins

==== History ====
The Chinese people have a long history of migration to overseas territories, as far back as the 10th century. One of the migrations dates back to the Ming dynasty when Zheng He (1371–1435), a Chinese man of Iranian ancestry, became the envoy of the Ming empire. He sent people – many of them Cantonese and Hokkien – to explore and trade in the South China Sea and in the Indian Ocean. It was during this time that the Malacca Strait and Malacca Sultanate developed as a maritime hub in the newly established Maritime Silk Road.

=== Early emigration ===
In the mid-1800s, outbound migration from China increased as a result of the European colonial powers opening up treaty ports. The British colonization of Hong Kong further created the opportunity for Chinese labor to be exported to plantations and mines.

During the era of European colonialism, many overseas Chinese were coolie laborers. Chinese capitalists overseas often functioned as economic and political intermediaries between colonial rulers and colonial populations.

The area of Taishan, Guangdong Province was the source for many of economic migrants. In the provinces of Fujian and Guangdong in China, there was a surge in emigration as a result of the poverty and village ruin.

San Francisco and California was an early American destination in the mid-1800s because of the California Gold Rush. Many settled in San Francisco forming one of the earliest Chinatowns. For the countries in North America and Australia saw great numbers of Chinese gold diggers finding gold in the gold mining and railway construction. Widespread famine in Guangdong impelled many Cantonese to work in these countries to improve the living conditions of their relatives.

From 1853 until the end of the 19th century, about 18,000 Chinese were brought as indentured workers to the British West Indies, mainly to British Guiana (now Guyana), Trinidad and Jamaica. Their descendants today are found among the current populations of these countries, but also among the migrant communities with Anglo-Caribbean origins residing mainly in the United Kingdom, the United States and Canada.

Some overseas Chinese were sold to South America during the Punti–Hakka Clan Wars (1855–1867) in the Pearl River Delta in Guangdong.

Research conducted in 2008 by German researchers who wanted to show the correlation between economic development and height, used a small dataset of 159 male labourers from Guangdong who were sent to the Dutch colony of Suriname to illustrate their point. They stated that the Chinese labourers were between 161 to 164 cm in height for males. Their study did not account for factors other than economic conditions and acknowledge the limitations of such a small sample.

The Lanfang Republic in West Kalimantan was established by overseas Chinese.

In 1909, the Qing dynasty established the first Nationality Law of China. It granted Chinese citizenship to anyone born to a Chinese parent. It permitted dual citizenship.

=== Republic of China (1912–1949) ===
In the first half of the 20th Century, war and revolution accelerated the pace of migration out of China. The Kuomintang and the Communist Party competed for political support from overseas Chinese.

The military conflicts and economic mayhem under the Beiyang and Nationalist rule pushed increasing numbers of people to migrate, mostly through the coastal regions via the ports of Fujian, Guangdong, Hainan and Shanghai. These migrations are considered to be among the largest in China's history. Many nationals of the Republic of China fled and settled down overseas mainly between 1911 and 1949 before the Nationalist government led by Kuomintang lost the mainland to Communist revolutionaries and relocated. Most of the nationalist and neutral refugees fled mainland China to North America while others fled to Southeast Asia (Singapore, Brunei, Thailand, Malaysia, Indonesia and Philippines).

=== After World War II ===
Those who fled during 1912–1949 and settled down in Singapore and Malaysia automatically gained citizenship in 1957 and 1963 as these countries gained independence. Kuomintang members who settled in Malaysia and Singapore played a major role in the establishment of the Malaysian Chinese Association and their meeting hall at Sun Yat Sen Villa. There was evidence that some intended to reclaim mainland China from the CCP by funding the Kuomintang.

After their defeat in the Chinese Civil War, parts of the Nationalist army retreated south and crossed the border into Burma as the People's Liberation Army entered Yunnan. The United States supported these Nationalist forces because the United States hoped they would harass the People's Republic of China from the southwest, thereby diverting Chinese resources from the Korean War. The Burmese government protested and international pressure increased. Beginning in 1953, several rounds of withdrawals of the Nationalist forces and their families were carried out. In 1960, joint military action by China and Burma expelled the remaining Nationalist forces from Burma, although some went on to settle in the Burma–Thailand borderlands.

During the 1950s and 1960s, the ROC tended to seek the support of overseas Chinese communities through branches of the Kuomintang based on Sun Yat-sen's use of expatriate Chinese communities to raise money for his revolution. During this period, the People's Republic of China tended to view overseas Chinese with suspicion as possible capitalist infiltrators and tended to value relationships with Southeast Asian nations as more important than gaining support of overseas Chinese, and in the Bandung declaration explicitly stated that overseas Chinese owed primary loyalty to their home nation.From the mid-20th century onward, emigration has been directed primarily to Western countries such as the United States, Australia, Canada, Brazil, The United Kingdom, New Zealand, Argentina and the nations of Western Europe; as well as to Peru, Panama, and to a lesser extent to Mexico. Many of these emigrants who entered Western countries were themselves overseas Chinese, particularly from the 1950s to the 1980s, a period during which the PRC placed severe restrictions on the movement of its citizens.

Due to the political dynamics of the Cold War, there was relatively little migration from the People's Republic of China to southeast Asia from the 1950s until the mid-1970s.Statistics show that between 1949 and 1978, Qingtian, a county in Zhejiang known for its large diasporan communities abroad, only permitted 752 people to go abroad throughout this entire period.In 1984, Britain agreed to transfer the sovereignty of Hong Kong to the PRC; this triggered another wave of migration to the United Kingdom (mainly England), Australia, Canada, US, South America, Europe and other parts of the world. The 1989 Tiananmen Square protests and massacre further accelerated the migration. The wave calmed after Hong Kong's transfer of sovereignty in 1997. In addition, many citizens of Hong Kong hold citizenships or have current visas in other countries so if the need arises, they can leave Hong Kong at short notice.

In recent years, the People's Republic of China has built increasingly stronger ties with African nations. In 2014, author Howard French estimated that over one million Chinese have moved in the past 20 years to Africa.

Multiple Chinatowns in Manhattan, Queens, and Brooklyn are thriving as traditionally urban enclaves, as large-scale Chinese immigration continues into New York. The New York metropolitan area contains the largest ethnic Chinese population outside of Asia, comprising an estimated 893,697 uniracial individuals as of 2017. An estimated 15,000 to 30,000 Chinese live in Austria.

More recent Chinese presences have developed in Europe, where they number well over 1 million, and in Russia, they number over 200,000, concentrated in the Russian Far East. Russia's main Pacific port and naval base of Vladivostok, once closed to foreigners and belonged to China until the late 19th century, as of 2010 bristles with Chinese markets, restaurants and trade houses. A growing Chinese community in Germany consists of around 76,000 people as of 2010.

=== Japanese diaspora ===

The Japanese diaspora and its individual members, known as Nikkei (Japanese: 日系, IPA: [ɲikkeː]) or as Nikkeijin (Japanese: 日系人, IPA: [ɲikkeꜜːʑiɴ]), comprise the Japanese emigrants from Japan (and their descendants) residing in a country outside Japan. Emigration from Japan was recorded as early as the 15th century to the Philippines, but did not become a mass phenomenon until the Meiji period (1868–1912), when Japanese emigrated to the Philippines and to the Americas. There was significant emigration to the territories of the Empire of Japan during the period of Japanese colonial expansion (1875–1945); however, most of these emigrants repatriated to Japan after the 1945 surrender of Japan ended World War II in Asia.

According to the Association of Nikkei and Japanese Abroad, about 4 million Nikkei live in their adopted countries. The largest of these foreign communities are in Brazil, the United States, the Philippines, China, Canada, and Peru. Descendants of emigrants from the Meiji period still maintain recognizable communities in those countries, forming separate ethnic groups from Japanese people in Japan. The largest of these foreign communities are in the Brazilian states of São Paulo and Paraná. There are also significant cohesive Japanese communities in the Philippines, Peru and in the American state of Hawaii. Nevertheless, most emigrant Japanese are largely assimilated outside of Japan.

As of 2024, the Japanese Ministry of Foreign Affairs reported the five countries with the highest number of Japanese expatriates as the United States (413,380), Australia (104,141), China (97,538), Canada (77,294), and Thailand (70,421).

=== Korean diaspora ===

The Korean diaspora consists of around 7.3 million people, descendants of emigrants from the Korean Peninsula across various waves of migration. Around 86% of overseas Koreans live in six countries: the United States, China, Japan, Canada, Vietnam and Uzbekistan. Other countries with greater than 0.5% Korean minorities include Brazil, Russia, Kazakhstan, Vietnam, the Philippines, and Indonesia. All of these figures include both permanent and temporary migrants. Outside of Continental and East Asia, there are sizeable Korean communities that have formed in Germany, the United Kingdom, France, the United States, Canada, Australia, and New Zealand.

== South Asian diaspora ==

The South Asian diaspora is the group of people whose ancestral origins lie in South Asia, but who live outside the region. With more than 44 million people within the cultural diaspora, it is one of the largest in the world. The term encompasses all whose ancestral and cultural origins lie in the modern nations of India, Pakistan, Bangladesh, Nepal, Sri Lanka, Bhutan, the Maldives and Nepal, with Afghanistan often included. The diaspora is considered a distinct ethnic group by many nations’ censuses, with it having the largest number of immigrants in the world.

=== Ancient era ===
Some South Asians lived in other parts of the world for trade purposes. During the Roman Empire, a few South Asians came to Europe. Additionally, there is evidence of contact between the ancient Greeks and South Asian civilisations, with some even having been suggested to have adopted a form of Greco-Buddhism.

As for the Roman Empire, many civilisations such as the Chera, Gupta, Kushan and Pandya empires are documented to have interacted and proceeded in commercial trade with the West, particularly through the Silk Road in the north, as written by Pliny the Elder, Ptolemy and Strabo.

=== Colonial era ===
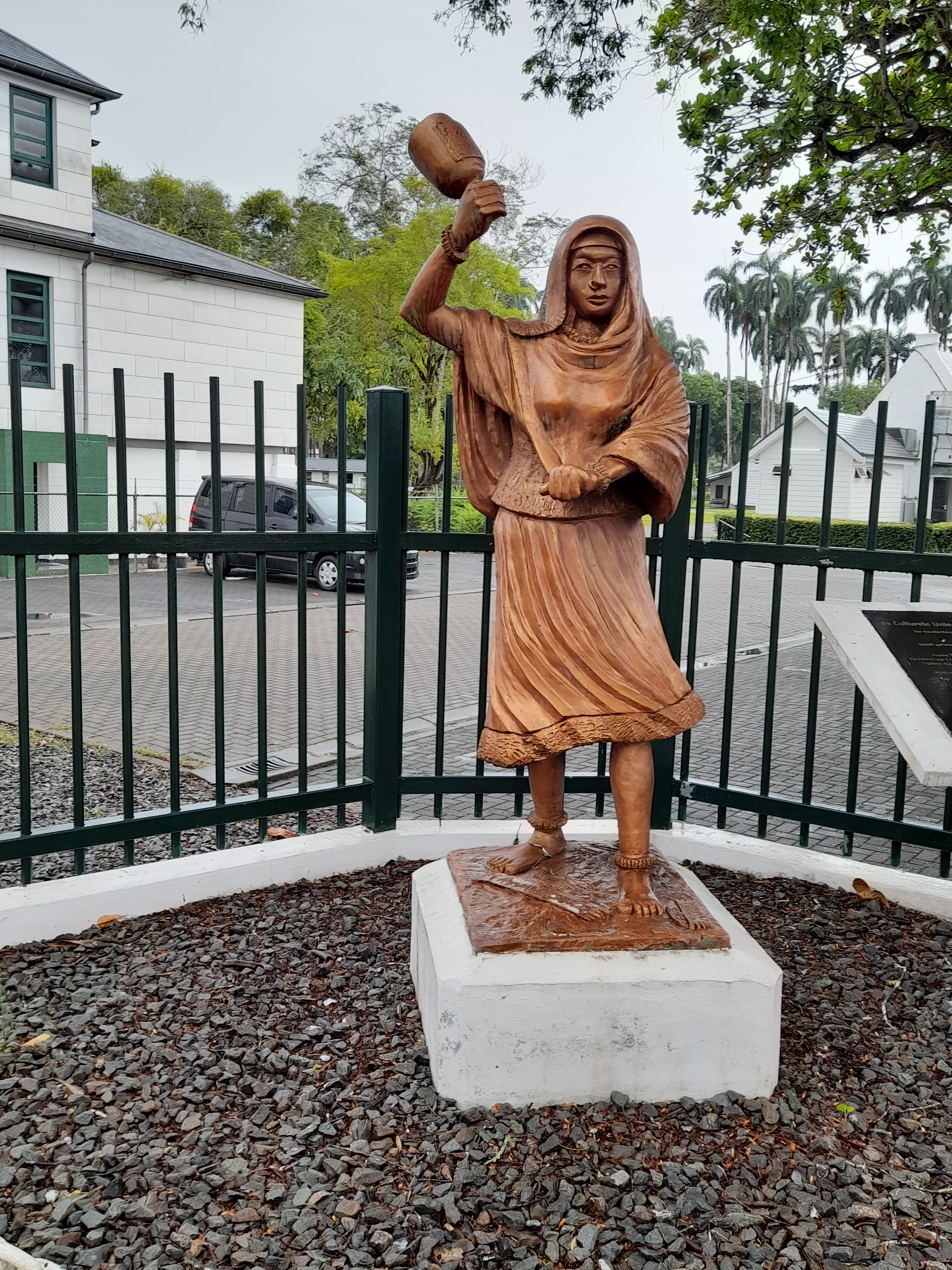
A statue commemorating Janey Tetary, an Indian indentured servant who died in an 1884 uprising in Suriname

During the colonial era, over 1 million South Asians were taken to other parts of the world as indentured servants, to places such as Fiji, Guyana, and parts of the Caribbean. These immigrants formed the first large-scale South Asian diaspora community, forming unique dialects such as Fiji Hindustani and Caribbean Hindustani, with members of the diaspora rising to nationally significant roles. South Asians also were brought to parts of Southeast Asia as part of the British Empire.

Diaspora members played a significant role in opposing the British Raj as part of the Ghadar Movement, with many supporters of the movement fleeing the British Raj in favour of other nations, such as in North America, to continue Indian independence activism and the Ghadar Movement. At many times, these immigrants were returned to the British Raj, where they were often tried and imprisoned.

Some South Asians, mainly from Punjab, migrated to the West Coast in the United States, and mixed with the local Mexican community, whilst others moved to Canada, establishing a prominent South Asian diaspora in North America.

=== Contemporary era ===
South Asians have emigrated in record numbers since the end of the colonial era in the middle of the 20th century. Many South Asians migrated to the United Kingdom and participated in its post-war economic recovery. Some South Asians went to the Middle East for labour opportunities, though some were mistreated in a racist manner and exploited. After the Immigration and Nationality Act of 1965 that allowed nonwhite immigration was passed, Indian-Americans became the richest ethnic group in the United States, and comprise over 10% of the labour force in computing-related fields (see also: Deportation of Indian nationals under Donald Trump). Additionally, the group has in the contemporary era led to the creation of a unique Desi culture amongst members of the diaspora, with the creation of Little South Asias across the world, along with the election of diaspora members to important political and business roles.

Because South Asians had already dispersed across the world during the colonial era, a noted aspect of the diaspora is that it has produced several secondary diasporas - some of its members' families transited through several countries over generations to reach a final destination (e.g. a person's ancestors may have come from India to Africa, and then a few generations later from Africa to New Zealand).

== Southeast Asian diaspora ==
There has been Southeast Asian migration to France since the French Indochina period. Since 1975, there has been a mass resettlement of refugees from Laos, Cambodia, and Vietnam, primarily in France and the United States.

=== Malaysian diaspora ===
Map of the Malaysian Diaspora in the world

The Malaysian diaspora consists of Malaysian citizens who emigrated from Malaysia, or individuals with ancestral connections to its predecessor states, the Federation of Malaya, the Malayan Union or British Malaya, along with their descendants residing in foreign countries. The population is estimated at approximately 1.86 to 2.49 million, comprising both the descendants of early migrants and more recent emigrants from modern-day Malaysia. The largest of these overseas communities are located in Singapore, Australia, Brunei, and the United Kingdom.

Emigration from Malaysia is a complex demographic phenomenon existing for decades and having a number of reasons, with institutional racism being one of the major factors. The process is the reverse of the immigration to Malaysia. Malaysia does not keep track of emigration, and counts of Malaysians abroad are thus only available courtesy of statistics kept by the destination countries. As of 2025, according to the United Nations Department of Economic and Social Affairs, the population of the Malaysian diaspora stands at 2,486,673.

=== Filipino diaspora ===
Map of the Filipino diaspora in the world

An overseas Filipino (Filipino: Pilipino sa ibayong-dagat) is a person of full or partial Filipino origin who trace their ancestry back to the Philippines but are living and working outside of the country. This term generally applies to both people of Filipino ancestry and citizens abroad. As of 2019, there were over 15 million Filipinos overseas.

=== Thai diaspora ===
Overseas Thai or Thai diaspora (Thai: คนไทยพลัดถิ่น, คนไทยในต่างแดน) number approximately 1.1 million persons worldwide. They can be roughly divided into two groups:

A "non-resident Thai" is a citizen of Thailand who holds a Thai passport and has temporarily emigrated to another country for employment, residence, education or any other purpose. The Bank of Thailand estimates that, as of 2016, 1,120,837 Thais worked overseas.

=== Vietnamese diaspora ===
Map of the countries with a significant Vietnamese population

The Vietnamese diaspora refers to people of Vietnamese descent who live outside Vietnam.

The global overseas Vietnamese population is estimated at 5 to 6 million people. The largest communities are in the United States, with over 2.3 million Vietnamese Americans, alongside populations in France, Australia, and Germany. Smaller communities are found in Southeast Asia, particularly in Cambodia.

== West Asian diaspora ==
=== Arab diaspora ===

Arab diaspora (Arabic: الشتات العربي, romanized: ash-shatāt al-ʿarabī) refers to the dispersion of Arabs who live outside of the Arab world. It can refer to descendants of the Arab emigrants who, voluntarily or forcibly, migrated from their native lands to non-Arab countries, primarily in the Americas, Europe, Southeast Asia, and West Africa.

Immigrants from Arab countries, such as Lebanon, Syria and Palestine, also form significant diasporas in other Arab states – see Palestinian refugees and refugees of the Syrian civil war.

=== Iranian diaspora ===
Map of the Iranian people around the world, as of 2021

The Iranian diaspora (collectively known as Iranian expats or expatriates) is the global population of Iranian citizens or people of Iranian descent living outside Iran.

While Iranian migration has occurred historically, a significant wave of Iranians fled Iran after the 1979 Islamic Revolution due to political persecution under the new government. This trend has continued and intensified in the 2020s due to economic instability and political unrest.

In 2021, the Ministry of Foreign Affairs of Iran published statistics showing that 4,037,258 Iranians were living abroad. This figure includes people of Iranian ancestry in the United Arab Emirates, Kuwait, Israel, Turkey, and Bahrain whose families may have left Iran decades prior to the 1979 revolution, as well as those with partial ancestry. In December 2025, United Nations data indicated that there were 1.6 million Iranian asylum seekers worldwide, though most Iranians abroad are not asylum seekers.

Over one million people of Iranian descent live in the United States, with significant populations (between 100,000 and 500,000) in Australia, Canada, Germany, Israel, Sweden, Turkey, and the United Kingdom. In early 2026, the Iranian diaspora began holding rallies around the world in support of the 2025–2026 Iranian protests.

=== Jewish diaspora ===
Map of the Jewish diaspora. Israel ≥ 1,000,000 ≥ 100,000 ≥ 10,000 ≥ 1,000

The Jewish diaspora (Hebrew: גוֹלָה gōlā), alternatively the dispersion (תְּפוּצָה təfūṣā) or the exile (גָּלוּת gālūṯ; Yiddish: גלות gōləs), (Note: Other Ashkenazic- or Yiddish-based variants include galus, goles and golus. A Hebrew-based variant spelling is galuth.) consists of Jews who reside outside of the Land of Israel. Historically, it refers to the expansive scattering of the Israelites out of their homeland in the Southern Levant and their subsequent settlement in other parts of the world, which gave rise to the various Jewish communities.

In the Hebrew Bible, the term gālūṯ (lit. 'exile') denotes the fate of the Twelve Tribes of Israel over the course of two major exilic events in ancient Israel and Judah: the Assyrian captivity, which occurred after the Kingdom of Israel was conquered by the Neo-Assyrian Empire in the 8th century BCE; and the Babylonian captivity, which occurred after the Kingdom of Judah was conquered by the Neo-Babylonian Empire in the 6th century BCE. While those who were taken from Israel dispersed as the Ten Lost Tribes, those who were taken from Judah—consisting of the Tribe of Judah and the Tribe of Benjamin—became known by the identity "Jew" (יְהוּדִי Yehūdī, lit. 'of Judah') and were repatriated following the Persian conquest of Babylonia.

A Jewish diaspora population existed for many centuries before the Roman siege of Jerusalem in 70 CE. In the preceding Second Temple period, it existed as a consequence of various factors, including the creation of political and war refugees, enslavement, deportation, overpopulation, indebtedness, military employment, and opportunities in business, commerce, and agriculture. Prior to the mid-1st century CE, in addition to Judea, Syria, and Babylonia, large Jewish communities existed in the Roman provinces of Egypt, Crete and Cyrenaica, and in Rome itself. In 6 CE, most of the Southern Levant was organized as the Roman province of Judaea, where a large uprising led to the First Jewish–Roman War, which destroyed the Second Temple and most of Jerusalem. The Jewish defeat to the Roman army and the accompanying elimination of the symbolic centre of Jewish identity (the Temple in Jerusalem) marked the end of Second Temple Judaism, motivating many Jews to formulate a new self-definition and adjust their existence to the prospect of an indefinite period of displacement. Nevertheless, intermittent warfare between Jewish nationalists and the Roman Empire continued for several decades. In 129/130 CE, the Roman emperor Hadrian ordered the construction of Aelia Capitolina over the ruins of Jerusalem, sparking the Bar Kokhba revolt in 132 CE. Led by Simon bar Kokhba, this uprising endured for four years, but was ultimately unsuccessful and became the last of the Jewish–Roman wars; Jews were massacred or displaced across the province, banned from Jerusalem and its surrounding areas, and forbidden to practice Judaism, leading to a significant rise in the Jewish diaspora.

=== Turkish diaspora ===
Map of the Turkish people around the world

The Turkish diaspora (Turkish: Türk diasporası or Türk gurbetçiler) refers to ethnic Turkish people who have migrated from, or are the descendants of migrants from, the Republic of Turkey, Northern Cyprus or other modern nation-states that were once part of the former Ottoman Empire. Therefore, the Turkish diaspora is not only formed by people with roots from mainland Anatolia and Eastern Thrace (i.e. the modern Turkish borders); rather, it is also formed of Turkish communities which have also left traditional areas of Turkish settlements in the Balkans (such as Bulgaria, Greece, North Macedonia, Romania, etc.), the island of Cyprus, the region of Meskhetia in Georgia, and the Arab world (such as Algeria, Iraq, Lebanon).

In particular, most mainland Turkish migration has been to Western and Northern Europe. Meanwhile, almost all the Turkish minorities in former Ottoman lands have a large diaspora in Turkey, many having migrated as muhacirs (refugees); furthermore, the Cretan Turks have migrated throughout the Levant; Cypriot Turks have a significant diaspora in the English-speaking countries (especially the UK and Australia); the Meskhetian Turks have a large diaspora in Central Asia; and Algerian Turks and Tunisian Turks have mostly settled in France. Since Bulgarian Turks and Romanian Turks gained EU citizenship in 2007, their diasporas in Western Europe significantly increased once restrictions on movement came to a halt in 2012.

== See also ==
- Asian people
- Diaspora#Asian diasporas
- Asian Diasporas (documentary)
- South-South migration
