= White Nights (radio) =

White Nights is a British radio documentary series, broadcast on BBC Radio 4 between 31 July and 4 August 2006.

The show is described as a "series of reflections on what happens on a summer night between wakefulness and sleep."

On each show, a famous person describes what happens to them during a summer night. Also, the show includes poetry, music and discussions on religious and other matters. People appearing include:

- Tamsin Greig, actress, star of Green Wing.
- Bobby Friction, disc jockey and critic.
- Lavinia Greenlaw, poet.
- Simon Elmes, radio producer.
- David Blunkett, former Labour home secretary.
