= Up the Garden Path (radio and TV series) =

Novel, radio series, and TV sitcom

- Genre: Sitcom
- Written by: Sue Limb
- Directed by: David Askey
- Starring: Imelda Staunton; Mike Grady; Tessa Peake-Jones; Tom Mannion; Nicholas Le Prevost; Susan Kyd; René Zagger; David Robb; Neil McCaul; Adrienne O'Sullivan; Siobhan Hayes
- Country of origin: United Kingdom
- Original language: English
- No. of series: 3 (radio); 3 (television)
- No. of episodes: 20 (radio); 18 (television)

Production
- Producer: Humphrey Barclay
- Running time: 25 mins
- Production companies: Humphrey Barclay Productions; Granada Television

Original release
- Network: BBC Radio 4
- Release: 7 November 1987 – 22 December 1993
- Network: ITV
- Release: 2 May 1990 – 1 July 1993

Up the Garden Path is a 1984 novel by Sue Limb, which was adapted into a radio series by BBC Radio 4, and later into a television sitcom by Granada TV for ITV. Both the radio and television series comprised three seasons, with the radio series originally broadcast in 1987, 1988, and 1993, and the television seasons broadcast in 1990, 1991, and 1993.

The television series has been repeated on the United Kingdom digital channel ITV3. The radio series is regularly repeated on BBC Radio 4 Extra.

== Cast ==
- Isabelle 'Izzy' Comyn (Imelda Staunton)
- Dick Barnes (Mike Grady)
- Maria Shadwell (Tessa Peake-Jones, television; Marty Cruickshank, radio)
- Gwyn Jenkins (Tom Mannion, television; Sion Probert and Dafydd Hywel, radio)
- Michael Tristram (Nicholas Le Prevost)
- Louise Tristram (Susan Kyd, television; Phyllida Nash, radio)
- Roger 'Razors' Razebrook (René Zagger)
- Charles Armstrong (David Robb) appeared in Series 2
- Bill Bailey (Neil McCaul) appeared in Series 2, 3
- Linda (Adrienne O'Sullivan) appeared in Series 3
- 5C pupil (Siobhan Hayes) appeared in Series 2, 3
- Vincent (Kevin Treasure) appeared in Series 2, 3

== Episodes ==
=== Radio ===
Series 1 (1987)

The first series was broadcast Saturdays at 11.00 pm

- Episode 1: "New Year, Old Problems" (7 November 1987)
- Episode 2: "Tangled Webs" (14 November 1987)
- Episode 3: "Punch Ups and Put Downs" (21 November 1987)
- Episode 4: "Into the Lion's Den" (28 November 1987)
- Episode 5: "The Menage" (5 December 1987)
- Episode 6: "Over and Out" (12 December 1987)

Series 2 (1988)

The second series was broadcast Saturdays at 11.00 pm

- Episode 1: "Arrivals and Departures" (15 October 1988)
- Episode 2: "Hot Water" (22 October 1988)
- Episode 3: "A Soft-Hearted Little Thing" (29 October 1988)
- Episode 4: "The View from the Bridge" (5 November 1988)
- Episode 5: "On the Side of the Angels" (12 November 1988)
- Episode 6: "You Shall Go to the Ball" (19 November 1988)
- Episode 7: "The More the Merrier" (26 November 1988)
- Episode 8: "Love's Labours" (3 December 1988)

Series 3 (1993)

The third series was broadcast Wednesdays at 12.25 am

- Episode 1: "New Men" (17 November 1993)
- Episode 2: "Gooseberries and Fools" (24 November 1993)
- Episode 3: "Over-Drawn, Over-Sexed and Over-Optimistic" (1 December 1993)
- Episode 4: "Talking It on the Chin" (8 December 1993)
- Episode 5: "Up the Stick and Sick as a Parrot" (15 December 1993)
- Episode 6: "A Dick in Shining Armour" (22 December 1993)

=== Television ===
Series	Episodes	Originally released	
Series	Episodes	First released	Last released
1	6	2 May 1990	6 June 1990
2	6	29 May 1991	3 July 1991
3	6	27 May 1993	1 July 1993

Series 1 (1990)

No. overall	No. in series	Title	Directed by	Written by	Original release date
1	1	"Episode 1"	David Askey	Sue Limb	2 May 1990
2	2	"Episode 2"	David Askey	Sue Limb	9 May 1990
3	3	"Episode 3"	David Askey	Sue Limb	16 May 1990
4	4	"Episode 4"	David Askey	Sue Limb	23 May 1990
5	5	"Episode 5"	David Askey	Sue Limb	30 May 1990
6	6	"Episode 6"	David Askey	Sue Limb	6 June 1990

Series 2 (1991)

No. overall	No. in series	Title	Directed by	Written by	Original release date
7	1	"Episode 1"	David Askey	Sue Limb	29 May 1991
8	2	"Episode 2"	David Askey	Sue Limb	5 June 1991
9	3	"Episode 3"	David Askey	Sue Limb	12 June 1991
10	4	"Episode 4"	David Askey	Sue Limb	19 June 1991
11	5	"Episode 5"	David Askey	Sue Limb	26 June 1991
12	6	"Episode 6"	David Askey	Sue Limb	3 July 1991

Series 3 (1993)

No. overall	No. in series	Title	Directed by	Written by	Original release date
13	1	"Episode 1"	David Askey	Sue Limb	27 May 1993
14	2	"Episode 2"	David Askey	Sue Limb	3 June 1993
15	3	"Episode 3"	David Askey	Sue Limb	10 June 1993
16	4	"Episode 4"	David Askey	Sue Limb	17 June 1993
17	5	"Episode 5"	David Askey	Sue Limb	24 June 1993
18	6	"Episode 6"	David Askey	Sue Limb	1 July 1993

== Reception ==
Critical reception was mixed. Writing in the Daily Mirror, television editor Tony Pratt called the first series 'one of the best [sitcoms] ITV has produced for ages. It's lively, adult and funny'.

However, The Guardian felt 'sorry for Imelda Staunton...who deserves a better script' with Hugh Hebert labelling the series 'dire' and referring to the character of Izzy as a 'caricature witless teacher who was God's promo for Baker MacGregor Re-Education Inc.'
