= Radio Lives =

- Genre: biographic
- Running time: 40 mins
- Language(s): English
- Home station: BBC Radio 4
- Original release: 23 August 1990 – 5 December 1996
- No. of series: 7
- No. of episodes: 41

Radio Lives was a long running BBC Radio 4 biographical series consisting of portraits of great radio figures. Running over seven series from 1990–96, each episode featured a personality who was influential either on the air or behind the scenes, and was presented by someone with a keen interest in their subject. The programmes demonstrated a striking range of subjects as varied as Edward R. Murrow (the voice of Britain for an American radio audience at the height of the London blitz) to Kenneth Williams, and William Hardcastle (inaugural presenter of The World at One) to Nancy Spain (socialite). Presenters have included Patricia Routledge, Charles Kennedy, Mark Lawson and Humphrey Carpenter.

== Programmes ==
=== Series 1, 19 July – 23 August 1990 ===
Subject	Presenter	Producer
C. E. M. Joad	June Knox-Mawer	Julian Hale
Gracie Fields	Patricia Routledge	Elizabeth Burke
J. B. S. Haldane	Professor John Durant	Mark Savage
Stephen Potter	Mark Lawson	Hamish Mykura
Gilbert Harding	Brian Masters	Nigel Acheson
A. P. Herbert	Charles Kennedy	Fiona Couper

=== Series 2, 23 May – 20 June 1991 ===
Subject	Presenter	Producer
Derek McCulloch	Trevor Hill	Simon Elmes
Isobel Barnett	June Knox-Mawer	Mark Savage
Tommy Handley	Phil Smith	Julian Hale
J. B. Priestley	Ronald Eyre	Penny Lawrence
William Hardcastle	Christopher Cook	Fiona McLean

=== Series 3, 6 August – 10 September 1992 ===
Subject	Presenter	Producer
Mary Stocks	Anne Karpf	Julian Hale
Jimmy Clitheroe	Phil Smith	Simon Elmes
Edgar Lustgarten	Jonathan Goodman	Matt Thompson
Audrey Russell	Roisin McAuley	Fran Acheson
Edward R Murrow	Christopher Cook	Fiona McLean
A. G. Street	Sean Street	

=== Series 4, 27 May – 1 July 1993 ===
Subject	Presenter	Producer
Sir Hugh Greene	Alasdair Milne	Julian Hale
Jimmy Edwards	Nigel Farrell	Ronni Davis
René Cutforth	Peter White	Nigel Acheson
Nancy Spain	Natalie Wheen	Matt Thompson
Marghanita Laski	David Wheeler	Louise Purslow
Louis MacNeice	Humphrey Carpenter	Fiona McLean

=== Series 5, 9 June – 14 July 1994 ===
Subject	Presenter	Producer
Kenneth Williams	Russell Davies	Simon Elmes
Hermione Gingold		Matt Thompson
Chester Wilmot	Philip Knightly	Julian Hale
Leslie Welch	Jon Stock	Ann-Marie Evans
Peter Eckersley	Derek Robinson	Bella Bannerman
R. D. Smith	Humphrey Carpenter	Fiona McLean

=== Series 6, 29 June – 3 August 1995 ===
Subject	Presenter	Producer(s)
Gerald Priestland	Robert Fox	Simon Elmes
Frankie Howerd	Dylan Winter	Matt Thompson
Kenny Everett	Robert Sandall	Chris Paling
Eamonn Andrews	Peter White	Nigel Acheson and Kim Normanton
Charles Parker	Laurie Taylor	Sally Flatman
Jack de Manio	Nick Baker	Cathy Drysdale

=== Series 7, 31 October – 5 December 1996 ===
Subject	Presenter	Producer
Jon Pertwee	Nick Baker	Peter Hoare
Brian Redhead	Michael Bywater	Bob Carter
Liberace		Matt Thompson
Freya Stark	Peggy Reynolds	Sarah Bowen
Russell Harty	Richard Coles	Fiona Couper
A. J. Ayer	Laurie Taylor	Julian Hale
