= Alison and Maud =

British radio programme

- Running time: 25 minutes
- Country of origin: United Kingdom
- Language: English
- Home station: BBC Radio 4
- Hosted by: Denise Coffey; Miriam Margolyes
- Written by: Sue Limb
- Original release: December 2002 – April 2004
- No. of series: 2
- No. of episodes: 12

Alison and Maud is a radio programme written by Sue Limb which aired in two series from December 2002 to April 2004. There were twelve 25 minute episodes in total and it was originally broadcast on BBC Radio 4 and has subsequently been repeated on BBC Radio 7 and BBC Radio 4 Extra. It stars Denise Coffey and Miriam Margolyes together with other cast members of Limb's previous Radio 4 comedy series The Wordsmiths at Gorsemere.
