= Boothby Graffoe (comedian) =

British musician and comedian

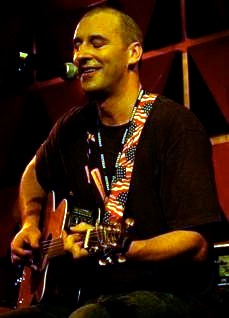
Graffoe performing live on Barenaked Ladies' Ships & Dip III cruise, in 2008

Boothby Graffoe (born James Martyn Rogers, 1961) is an English comedian, singer, songwriter and playwright. He is particularly known for his surreal sense of humour and work with the Canadian band Barenaked Ladies.

== Early life ==
Rogers was born in 1961 in Hull, England. For the latter part of his schooling, he attended Queen Elizabeth's Grammar School, Horncastle. At the age of 18, he worked as a lifeguard at a Butlins resort. He named his alter ego after an English village while driving back from a gig in the late 1980s.

== Stand-up comedy ==
Graffoe often incorporates guitar playing into his stage act, through his oddball (and usually slightly twisted) songs, including such titles as "Planet Dog", "Woof" and his album's title track, "Wot Italian" (sometimes referred to as "Umbrella Head Boy"). Some of his song titles are still more surreal, in that they do not reflect the subject matter, such as "Giraffes Don't Play Harmonicas, So It Can't Be a Giraffe" and "The Consequences of Living in a Container". He is currently accompanied by the violinist Nick Pynn, having previously toured with acoustic guitarist Antonio Forcione.

On a tour of Scotland in 2007, Graffoe announced his intention to retire from stand-up comedy and concentrate on writing for Omid Djalili. He subsequently toured as a warm-up act for Djalili and Barenaked Ladies, but has recently announced a new tour and album (Songs for Dogs' Funerals). He is a regular performer at the annual Edinburgh Festival Fringe.

Graffoe has won several awards, including the 2002 Adelaide Fringe Award for Excellence, and the Time Out Comedy Award. He has been nominated for British comedy's Perrier Award.

== Radio ==
Graffoe started his radio career in 1988 on BBC Radio Lincolnshire, when he presented a two-hour programme (Boothby Graffoe Live) on Friday evenings until late 1990.

He appeared regularly on BBC Radio 4's Loose Ends with Ned Sherrin.

He made the following comedy and music series for Radio 4:

- The Big Booth Radio 4 (2000–01)
- Boothby Graffoe In No Particular Order Radio 4 (2003–05)

== Television ==
In 2003, Graffoe appeared on NBC's Late Night with Conan O'Brien. In 2013 he appeared as one of a number of acts in The Alternative Comedy Experience performing at The Stand in Edinburgh and also being interviewed backstage by the curator of the show Stewart Lee.

== Music ==
In 2004 Graffoe released his first album of songs with Antonio Forcione, Wot Italian?. A second disc followed in 2006, a live recording of a show in Brighton billed as Boothby Graffoe & the Following People.

Graffoe has acted as support for Canadian band Barenaked Ladies on its "Last Summer on Earth" 2013 tour and on four of Barenaked Ladies' UK tours: first in 2004 for the Barenaked for the Holidays tour, then in 2007 on the Barenaked Ladies Are Me tour, again in 2010 on the band's All In Good Time tour and finally on the band's Detour de Force tour in 2022. Boothby mostly performs solo, with various members of the band joining him to play bass (Jim Creeggan), keyboard (Kevin Hearn) and drums (guitarist Ed Robertson) for some of the songs.

In January 2008, Graffoe joined the line-up for Barenaked Ladies' cruise Ships and Dip, where he performed solo and with members from BNL and other bands on board. He returned for two further Ships and Dip cruises in 2009 and 2011.

Boothby's third album, Songs For Dogs, Funerals..... was released in February 2011, featuring studio recordings of three tracks from Boothby Graffoe & The Following People together with a selection of all-new tracks. Musicians appearing on the album included Nick Pynn, Theseus Gerard and Dean Friedman.

His fourth album, Bang! Is This Your Vehicle, Sir? was released on 27 February 2012. The album features guest appearances from Nick Pynn, Kevin Hearn, Omid Djalili, and members of Canadian band Thin Buckle.

A fifth album, Nomad, was released in March 2013, following a campaign on Kickstarter.

In summer 2013, he was the support act on Barenaked Ladies' 'Last Summer On Earth Tour,' along with Guster and Ben Folds Five.

During 2020, he began a series of online performances via the Zoom platform, with guests such as Robyn Hitchcock and Tim Vine.

== Stage plays written by Boothby Graffoe ==
- The Condition of the Virgin, 2001
- One Night Stand: God and Adam, 2002
- Hitler Sells Tickets, 2004

All three plays were subsequently adapted for BBC Radio.

== Books ==
- Sit-Down Comedy (contributor to anthology, ed Malcolm Hardee & John Fleming) Ebury Press/Random House, 2003. ISBN 0-09-188924-3; ISBN 978-0-09-188924-1

== DVDs ==
- Boothby Graffoe and the Following People – May 2009
- The Boothby Graffoe Mish Mash – March 2013
