= Nick Revell =

British comedian

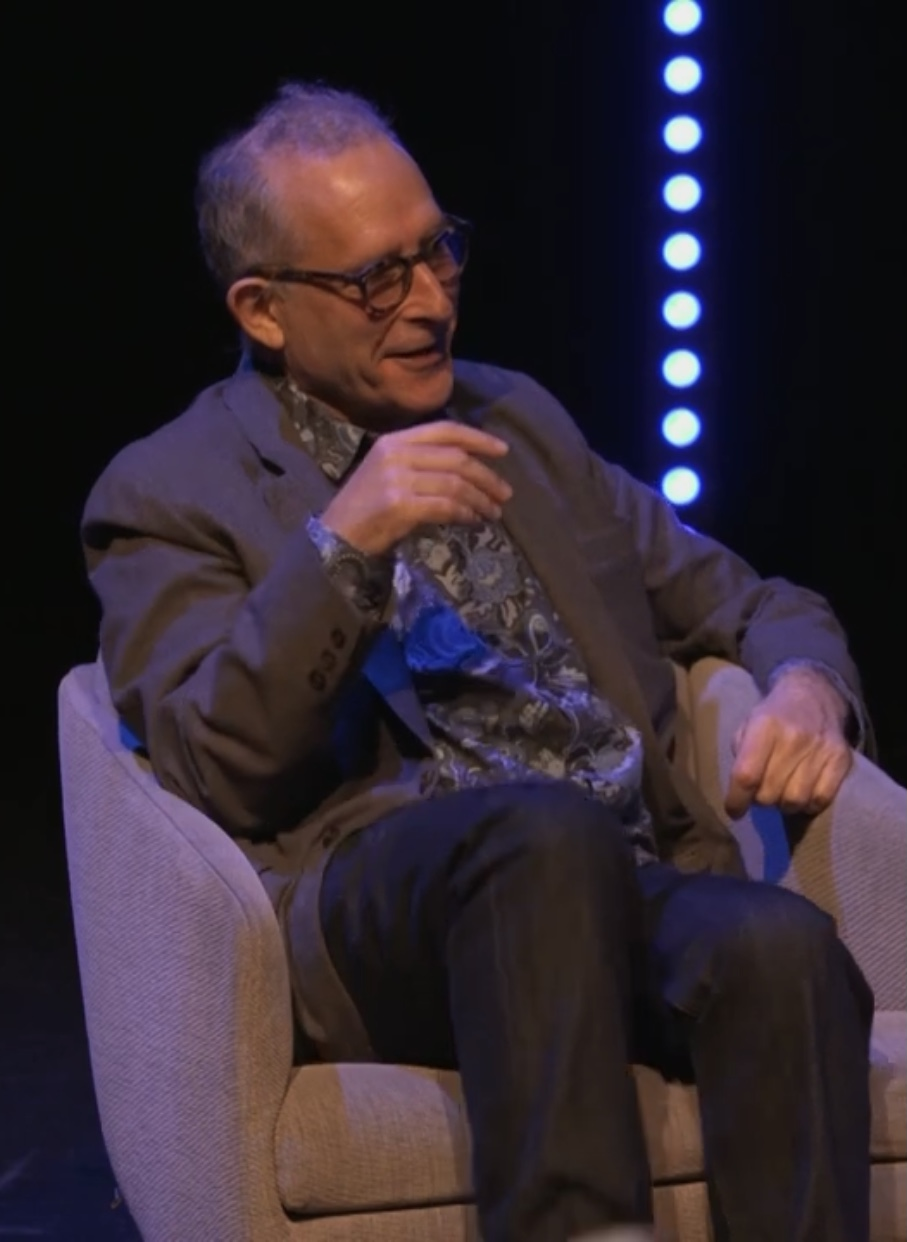
- Revell at the British Library in 2022
- Born: John Revell
- Education: Lincoln College, Oxford
- Occupations: Comedian writer
- Years active: 1980–present
- Website: nickrevell.com

Nick Revell is a British comedian and writer for radio and television. Born John Revell, he studied at Lincoln College, Oxford.

Revell started performing stand-up in 1980 at Comedy Store, where he later became a regular MC, between 1982 and 1992. According to his website, he then gave up being a stand-up comedian and started writing for radio and television until 2002.

At the Edinburgh Festival Fringe in 1987 he was nominated for the Perrier Award and won The Blackheath Award for Excellence.

He has written comedy radio shows including The Million Pound Radio Show (which he co-wrote and co-presented with Andy Hamilton), The Sunday Format, The House of the Spirit Levels (also published as a novel) and two series of The Nick Revell Show, and in 2018 BrokenDreamCatcher. He has written material for other comedians such as Jasper Carrott and Dave Allen. Television shows he has contributed to include Not the Nine O'Clock News, Naked Video, Three of a Kind and Drop the Dead Donkey.

He has written two novels, House of the Spirit Levels (1998) and Night of the Toxic Ostrich (2000).

He has appeared in radio shows such as Old Harry's Game (written by and starring Andy Hamilton), The Million-Pound Radio Show (1985-1992) and The Nick Revell Show (1992-1993).

During the 2005 UK general election campaign he presented a three-part comedy series about election-related news of the day. He co-wrote and co-starred in a 2006 Radio 4 sitcom, Living with the Enemy, with former Conservative MP Gyles Brandreth. Revell played alternative comedian turned alternative therapist Nick Reynolds, with Brandreth as Conservative MP turned media personality Gyles Brandon.

His most recent radio show is BrokenDreamCatcher (BBC R4 and BBC Sounds), which had series in 2018, 2020 and 2023.

== Bibliography ==
Novels

- House of the Spirit Levels (1998)
- Night of the Toxic Ostrich (2000)
