= Sue Limb =

British writer and broadcaster (born 1946)

Margaret Susan Limb (born 1946) is a British writer and broadcaster.

== Biography ==
Limb was born in Hitchin, Hertfordshire. Her family moved to Cheltenham where her father worked at GCHQ. Educated at Pate's Grammar School in Cheltenham, she studied Elizabethan lyric poetry at Newnham College, Cambridge and then trained in education.

While her first published book was a biography of the Antarctic explorer Captain Lawrence Oates co-authored with Patrick Cordingley, later works have been predominantly novels – many of them for young adults – and comedies for radio and television, often with a literary or historical setting. Limb's debut novel Up the Garden Path was adapted as a BBC Radio 4 sitcom, and subsequently broadcast on television on ITV.

For Radio 4, she has written a number of comedy series (which pay unusual attention to music and sound effects): The Wordsmiths at Gorsemere (a pastiche of the poet William Wordsworth and his circle at Grasmere, two series), The Sit Crom (set in the English Civil War), Four Joneses and a Jenkins (a reference to Four Weddings and a Funeral); Alison and Maud; and most recently Gloomsbury, "a rhapsody about bohemians", about members of the Bloomsbury Group and starring Miriam Margolyes and Alison Steadman.

Other works include Growing Pains (a documentary about ageing), Hilaire Belloc, Cities (six programmes of literary anthology). and the introduction to her Newnham contemporary Valerie Grosvenor Myer's biography of Harriette Wilson.

Under the name Dulcie Domum, Limb wrote Bad Housekeeping, a humorous weekly column in The Guardian's Weekend section between 1988 and 2001. Collections of the columns, a feminist novelist's diaries of a rural idyll gone wrong, were published in book form. The books, reissued by Solidus Press in 2002, are listed below.

In 1988, as Dulcie Domum, she coined the term "bonkbuster", which is a play on "blockbuster" and the verb "to bonk", which is British slang for "to have sexual intercourse". In 2002 the Oxford English Dictionary recognized this portmanteau, defining it as "a type of popular novel characterized by frequent explicit sexual encounters between the characters." Limb commented on the honour, "It's an unexpected event. People keep telling me I've made my place in history, so I can die happily now."

== Personal life ==
Limb was briefly married in 1970, being the first of the five wives of the historian, Professor Roy Porter. She was married to Jan Vriend, a Dutch classical musician, from 1985 to 1989.

She lives on a remote organic farm near Nailsworth in Gloucestershire.

In the 1989 European Parliament election she was the Green Party candidate for the Cotswolds constituency.

== Works ==
- Captain Oates, Soldier and Explorer (with Patrick Cordingley), Batsford, 1982, ISBN 0-7134-2693-4
- Up the Garden Path, Transworld, 1984, ISBN 0-370-30595-7
- Love Forty, Transworld, 1986, ISBN 0-552-12865-1
- The Wordsmiths at Gorsemere, Bantam, 1987, ISBN 0-593-01296-8
- Chicken Mission, Orchard, 1988, ISBN 1-86039-081-1
- Tree Trouble, Orchard, 1988, ISBN 1-85213-096-2
- Love's Labours, Transworld, 1989, ISBN 0-7278-5253-1
- Me Jane, Orchard, 1989, ISBN 1-86039-084-6
- Big Trouble, Orchard, 1990, ISBN 1-85213-097-0
- Dulcie Domum's Bad Housekeeping, Fourth Estate (reissued by Solidus Press 2002), 1990, ISBN 1-872180-27-2
- Sheep's Eyes and Hogwash, Heinemann, 1992, ISBN 0-434-42446-3
- More Bad Housekeeping, Fourth Estate (reissued by Solidus Press 2002), 1992, ISBN 1-85702-151-7
- Come Back, Grandma, Red Fox, 1993, ISBN 0-09-921951-4
- Dulcie Dishes the Dirt, Fourth Estate (reissued by Solidus Press 2002), 1994, ISBN 1-85702-236-X
- Passion Fruit, Heinemann, 1995, ISBN 0-434-00278-X
- Enlightenment, Heinemann, 1997, ISBN 0-434-00280-1
- Dulcie Goes Native, Severn House (reissued by Solidus Press 2002), 1998, ISBN 0-9543377-9-4
- Big and Little, Orchard, 1999, ISBN 1-85213-073-3
- You At The Back Stop Laughing, Beaver Books, 1999, ISBN 0-09-942670-6
- China Lee (reissued as You're Amazing, Mr Jupiter), Orchard, 2004, ISBN 978-1-84362-614-5
- Girl, 15, Charming But Insane, Bloomsbury, 2004, ISBN 0-7475-7185-6
- Girl (Nearly) 16: Absolute Torture, Bloomsbury, 2005, ISBN 0-7475-7562-2
- Girl 16: Pants on Fire, Bloomsbury, 2006, ISBN 0-7475-8216-5
- Ruby Rogers is a Waste of Space, Bloomsbury, 2006, ISBN 0-7475-8321-8
- Ruby Rogers: Yeah Whatever..., Bloomsbury, 2006, ISBN 978-0-7475-8322-6
- Girl, 15, Flirting for England, Bloomsbury, 2007, ISBN 978-0-7475-8477-3
- Zoe and Chloe: On the Prowl, Bloomsbury, 2007, ISBN 978-0-7475-8272-4
- Ruby Rogers is a Walking Legend, Bloomsbury, 2007, ISBN 978-0-7475-8323-3
- Girl, 16, Five-Star Fiasco, Bloomsbury, 2010
- Chocolate SOS, Bloomsbury, 2012
