= Gloomsbury =

British radio series

Gloomsbury is a BBC Radio 4 comedy sitcom which gently parodied the lives, loves and works of the Bloomsbury Group. It was written by Sue Limb and five series were produced, in 2012, 2014, 2015, 2017 and 2018.

== Cast ==
The character names were punning parodies of prominent members of the Bloomsbury Group and other characters of the day:

- Miriam Margolyes as Vera Sackcloth-Vest (Vita Sackville-West), creator of the garden at Sizzlinghurst Castle (Sissinghurst Castle Garden).
- Jonathan Coy as her husband, Henry Mickleton (Harold Nicolson).
- Alison Steadman as Ginny Fox (Virginia Woolf) and as Mrs Gosling, Vera's housekeeper, also Lady Utterline Immoral of Arsington (Lady Ottoline Morrell of Garsington Manor).
- Nigel Planer as Lionel Fox (Leonard Woolf) and Gosling, Vera's gardener (in series 1, 3, 4 and 5 – both played by Roger Lloyd-Pack in series 2), also Lytton Scratchy (Lytton Strachey) and (series 5) Winston Churchill (name unaltered). In series 3, episode 5, Planer portrayed The Prince of Wales (the future King Edward VIII) using an impression of Prince Charles.
- John Sessions as D. H. Lollipop (D. H. Lawrence), author of Lady Hattersley's Plover; also T. S. Jellitot (T. S. Eliot) and (in series 4) Llewd George (David Lloyd George) and W. B. Yikes (W. B. Yeats), and in (series 5) Robert Bletchley (Robert Benchley), George Gurnard Shaw (George Bernard Shaw), Ernest Hammingway (Ernest Hemingway), Gertrude Klein (Gertrude Stein) and James Voyce (James Joyce).
- Morwenna Banks as the "muse" Venus Traduces (Violet Trefusis). In series 3, episode 5, Banks portrayed Mrs Freda Cuddly-Broad (Freda Dudley Ward, mistress of the (then) Prince of Wales, later Edward VIII). In series 4 and 5 she is Hilda Matthewson (Hilda Matheson) and in series 5 also Frieda Lollipop (Frieda Lawrence), Dorothy Barker (Dorothy Parker), Barrington (Dora Carrington), Charlotte (Charlotte Payne-Townshend, Shaw's wife), Gwen Staubyn (Henry's/Harold's sister, married name Gwendolen St Aubyn) and Nancy Astor (name unaltered).

Each episode covered the various personal shenanigans and literary endeavours of the group, influenced by contemporary mores and events.

== Theme music ==
The theme for all episodes was "You're Driving Me Crazy", written in 1930, which could be considered rather late in the history of the Bloomsbury Group, and performed by The Temperance Seven.

== Production ==
The series was written by Sue Limb and produced by Little Brother Productions for the BBC.
