= Dan and Nick: The Wildebeest Years =

- Other names: Forty Nights in the Wildebeest
- Running time: 30 minutes
- Home station: BBC Radio 4
- Original release: 1998 – 2000
- No. of series: 2
- No. of episodes: 7

Dan and Nick: The Wildebeest Years is a BBC Radio 4 comedy series originally broadcast in seven episodes in 1998. The Dan and Nick of the title are Dan Freedman and Nick Romero, who often appeared together on Loose Ends.

A follow-up series of a further six episodes was made, this time called Forty Nights in the Wildebeest. Both series have been re-broadcast on BBC 7 during 2006 and 2007.

The characteristic feature of Freedman and Romero's style is the heavy use of puns. Indeed, the frequency of puns incorporated into these programmes has rarely been matched since I'm Sorry, I'll Read That Again but has been surpassed by the many radio and stage shows written by and starring Milton Jones.

== Themes ==
The show consisted of short sketches and songs performed in a cabaret style. Freedman and Romero had a supporting band, 'The Gents', who would accompany them on musical sections. Typical sketches typically lampooned films, music, and other popular culture. The "Britishness" of the show was reflected in the interest in subjects such as the royal family, and Radio 4, the station on which it was broadcast, with a fascination for characters such as Brian Perkins.

The programme owed much to earlier radio comedy shows such as Round the Horne, I'm Sorry I Haven't a Clue, and The Navy Lark. Later shows such as Dead Ringers could also be said to have been influenced by it. Some recurring jokes were:

- Incy Wincy Quincy, a spider pathologist, obviously lifted from TV-show Quincy, M.E.;
- Tossed in Space, a satire of Lost in Space about trapped salad items in space;
- censorship gags, for example, reading football scores while bleeping out any innocuous sounding words, including from the middle of words;
- The Annals of History and The Century's Passage, a humorous and satirical look back through historic events;
- Robin Would, a gay and camp version of Robin Hood with guest Richard Coles playing the lead, whose catchphrase was "What would you have me do? Live a lie?";
- The Big Fact Hunt (always pronounced very carefully), another excuse to introduce as many one liners as possible on a particular theme.

== Forty Nights in the Wildebeest ==
Forty Nights in the Wildebeest was the name of a follow-up series of six programmes, first broadcast on BBC Radio 4 in the year 2000. It followed a similar format to The Wildebeest Years: a quick-fire mixture of pun-laden short sketches and musical numbers.

The second show in the series was recorded at the Edinburgh Festival. Sketches included Hong Feng Shui and a musical number by Right Said Freud

A running gag in the series was a Radio 4 -style announcer saying:

"And now, the radio foreplay. <pause> I'm sorry, I'll read that again. <pause> And now, the Radio 4 play."
