= Palace of Laughter =

BBC Radio 4 comedy

Palace of Laughter is a radio comedy aired by the BBC on Radio 4 from 2002 to 2006.

A series of programmes hosted by Geoffrey Wheeler that visited old music halls principally in the British Isles, it focused on those that are particularly grand in their style of building. The programmes have been played again on Fridays in 2006 on BBC 7. During their run, they can be heard at the BBC 7 Listen Again page.

In 2004 Wheeler visited the Folies Bergère to broadcast an episode from Paris, which was named as The Guardian "pick of the day".

== List of shows ==
1. First Series (2002)
  1. London Windmill
  2. Glasgow Pavilion Theatre
  3. Manchester Playhouse
  4. Grand Blackpool
  5. Alhambra Leicester Square
  6. Belfast Grand Opera House
2. Second Series (2003)
  1. 22 July 2003 - Sunderland Empire
  2. 29 July 2003 - Royal Hippodrome, Eastbourne
  3. 5 August 2003 - Gaiety Theatre, Dublin
  4. 12 August 2003 - The Alhambra, Bradford
  5. 19 August 2003 - The Grand, Swansea
  6. 26 August 2003 - Gaiety Theatre, Ayr
3. Paris (2004)
  1. Folies Bergère
4. Stateside (2006)
  1. Vaudeville
  2. Memphis
  3. Boston & Minneapolis
