= Boothby Graffoe In No Particular Order =

British comedy radio programme

- Genre: Comedy radio
- Running time: 30 minutes
- Country of origin: United Kingdom
- Language: English
- Home station: BBC Radio 4
- Starring: Boothby Graffoe; Stephen Frost; Debra Stephenson
- Original release: March 2004 – August 2005
- No. of episodes: 12

Boothby Graffoe In No Particular Order is a comedy radio programme that aired from March 2004 to August 2005. There were 12 half-hour episodes and it was broadcast on BBC Radio 4. It starred Boothby Graffoe, Stephen Frost, and Debra Stephenson.
