= The House of the Spirit Levels =

The House of the Spirit Levels is a six-part radio comedy series written by, and starring, Nick Revell. It was a surrealist satire on big business and Northern family sagas with Revell playing the long-lost son of the Hardstaffe family who gets caught up in their business machinations. It was told in flashback from South America and did not end happily.

It is occasionally rebroadcast on the digital channel BBC Radio 4 Extra.

It was adapted into a novel by Revell, published in 1998, which was praised by The Times as "bizarre but more-ish" with Revell's "jokes mostly funny and his characters engaging".
