= John Byrne (columnist) =

Irish writer, cartoonist, performer, and broadcaster

John Byrne, sometimes known as John M. Byrne (born in Dublin, Ireland) is a writer, author, cartoonist, performer, and broadcaster.

== Early career ==
Byrne started his career as a communications officer for UNICEF in Malawi. After returning to England in 1989 he started a "live cartoons" show, a combination of stand-up comedy, art class and audience participation and performed at festivals, school libraries and corporate events.

== Biography ==
Byrne's cartoons have featured regularly in a wide range of newspapers and magazines. He has also worked for Christian Herald, Private Eye, the BBC's in-house magazine Ariel, Voluntary Sector magazine, Young Performers magazine, and as a careers advisor and agony uncle for The Stage newspaper.

== Broadcasting ==
Byrne's broadcasting and writing credits include TV and radio work for BBC TV, BBC World Service, Nickelodeon, ITV, Channel Five, Virgin Radio and 'script doctoring' roles for several shows and musicals.

== Selected bibliography ==
- Writing Comedy (3rd Edition)
- A Singer’s Guide to Getting Work (with Julie Payne)
- The Little Book of Cool at School
- Drawing Cartoons that Sell
- A Dancer’s Guide to Getting Work (with Jenny Belingy)
- The Bullybuster’s Joke Book
