= Living with the Enemy (radio programme) =

BBC Radio 4 sitcom written by and starring Nick Revell and Gyles Brandreth

- Genre: Situation comedy
- Running time: 30 minutes
- Country of origin: United Kingdom
- Language(s): English
- Home station: BBC Radio 4
- Starring: Gyles Brandreth, Nick Revell, Gugu Mbatha-Raw
- Created by: Gyles Brandreth, Nick Revell
- Written by: Gyles Brandreth, Nick Revell
- Produced by: Ed Morrish
- Original release: 14 November – 19 December 2006
- No. of series: 1
- No. of episodes: 6

Living with the Enemy is a BBC Radio 4 sitcom written by and starring Nick Revell and Gyles Brandreth. It made its debut on 14 November 2006.

Revell appears as Nick Reynolds, a former 1980s left-wing comedian, now alternative medicine practitioner. Brandreth appears as a former Conservative Party Minister turned minor television celebrity. The two are forced into sharing a flat in Hammersmith, London, after Nick accidentally floods Gyles's flat on the floor below. Gugu Mbatha-Raw plays Gyles's god-daughter, Sophie, who is the third lead character, and is the spoilt daughter of a corrupt African politician.

Revell is also a stand-up comedian in real life, whilst Brandreth was a Conservative MP between 1992 and 1997, when he served as a government whip in John Major's government. The inspiration for the series came about when the pair met by chance at the Edinburgh Festival and, despite being political opposites, found they got on surprisingly well, and thought this could be the basis for an 'Odd Couple' sitcom.
