= Never the Same Again (radio series) =

- Genre: human interest
- Running time: 30 mins
- Language(s): English
- Home station: BBC Radio 4
- Hosted by: Jenni Mills
- Produced by: Sarah Rowlands
- Original release: 16 March 1986 – 23 February 1995
- No. of series: 7
- No. of episodes: 28

Never the Same Again was a human interest radio series that ran for nine years on BBC Radio 4. As the evocative title suggests, presenter Jenni Mills talked with families about how they have resolved crises. Examples ranged from the rare (a family whose young daughter was abducted) to the commonplace (a couple adjusting to an elderly parent coming to live with them). Participants included well-known individuals (Marianne Wiggins, the wife of Salman Rushdie on living in hiding), as well as people outside of the public eye.

Throughout the material was deeply personal and moving. In some episodes participants talked about topics which at the time had been taboo. For example, having a gay son – an episode broadcast eight years before the emblematic Mum I’ve got Something to Tell You.

== Programmes ==
=== Series 1, 16 March – 13 April 1986 ===
1. ‘I'm sorry ma 'am, it is your boy...’ In 1983, 12-year-old Craig was killed in a road accident.
2. ‘It's like having another baby in the house...’ Valerie's mother-in-law lives with the family. She's 81 and mentally confused.
3. He thinks we're trying to poison him. Jim was 21 when his family discovered he was a schizophrenic.
4. If only all marriages were as happy as their relationship is. Ten years ago, Kate realised her eldest son was gay.

=== Series 2, 3–24 January 1988 ===
1. ‘The policeman came to the door and said: “Does your husband drive a white car?”’ In 1981 Paul was involved in a very serious car accident: he was in a coma for three months and afterwards did not know Janet, his wife.
2. ‘I was the third generation to work the farm, my son was about to take over, then the whole job went wrong.’ Eighteen months ago Anthony had to give up the family farm because of financial problems. He now runs a ferry boat in Northumberland.
3. ‘The very first I knew was early one morning the police came hammering on the front door.’ In 1979 Sue's husband, Steve, was arrested for receiving stolen property. He was sentenced to five years.
4. ‘Our relationship developed very slowly – we knew to keep our distance.’ Raj and Alison met in 1982, but there were difficulties to be overcome within both families before they married.

=== Series 3, 20 September – 11 October 1989 ===
1. Seven years ago, Liz and Fordyce Maxwell's 11-year-old daughter Susan disappeared.
2. When Sue Smith was 17, she was diagnosed as having a spinal tumour.
3. Elizabeth was doing A-levels, with a university place ahead, when she found she was pregnant.
4. On 22 August 1985, Damien, Debbie and two friends boarded a flight for Corfu at Manchester airport. The plane never got off the runway; fire and smoke spread through the passenger cabin. Damien and Debbie got out – their friends didn't.

=== Series 4, 7–28 February 1991 ===
1. ‘This bizarre event exploded in the middle of our love-making.’ Two years ago writer Marianne Wiggins was forced into hiding with her husband Salman Rushdie. They moved 56 times in the first five months – then Marianne emerged alone. She talks about her need to live a life of her own.
2. Mike and Margaret have been married for 30 years. Last summer Margaret discovered that for the past six years Mike had been having an affair with her best friend.
3. ‘Virtually anybody who walked through the door would have a baby, a bottle and a nappy thrown at them and be told to get on with it.’ Six years ago Jill gave birth to triplets.
4. ‘At first my friends said “Oh you poor baby” – but after a couple of days they just didn't want to know.’ Dorothy was raped when she was 19. She and her mother talk about their relationship since.

=== Series 5, 9–30 January 1992 ===
1. In 1965, 18-year-old Pat found she was pregnant. Her boyfriend James was still at school, and her parents forced her to have the baby adopted. Pat and James eventually married and had another daughter - but they never told her that she had an older sister.
2. In April 1989, Brian Moore, a young black man, was shopping with some friends in Norwich. They were attacked by a gang of white lads and tried to defend themselves – Brian ended up in prison serving a two-year sentence.
3. Ian and Judith bought a small business. Within a few months it had failed. The building society started court proceedings to repossess their home – but Ian didn't tell his wife.
4. Helen and John had been foster parents for six years when they were told that a child had been sexually abused while in their care. The alleged attacker was John's own father.

=== Series 6, 13 May – 9 June 1993 ===
1. Lawrence and Julie were members of the golf club and played bridge. But one night someone brought cannabis to the card table.
2. Ann was trying to be the perfect army wife, then one evening the Lieutenant-Colonel put down his paper and announced he was leaving her and their three sons.
3. Debbie was the Physiotherapist allocated to Mike after the car smash which broke his neck – but her feelings for him went beyond the Professional.
4. Eight years ago, Claire discovered she was HIV Positive. But how was she to break the news to her Parents and her four children?

=== Series 7, 2–23 February 1995 ===
1. During the miners' strike, one traumatic day cast a lasting shadow over Ernie's career as a policeman.
2. When Marika met Ann again, 17 years after they had last seen each other in the convent they had planned to enter as nuns, she knew her life had changed for ever. But where did that leave her husband Nick and their two children?
3. In January 1993 Greg Holliday failed to return from work. His wife and two children waited nearly four months for him to come home.
4. When Margaret and Richard decided to adopt two-year-old Patrick they had no idea how it would change their lives.
