= Lewis Costello =

English comedian, writer, and actor

- Born: Lewis Blaize Costello; 7 February 1993 (age 33); Blackburn, Lancashire, England

Comedy career
- Years active: 2008 – present
- Medium: Stand-up

Lewis Costello (born 7 February 1993), is an English comedian, writer, and actor.

His style involves storytelling and discussing popular culture. Stuart Holmes of CityLife commented; "Running through a mixture of laddish humour, original observations, and particularly clever deconstruction of Biblical events... He has both the confidence and material to go far in a competitive industry, and is certainly a talent to watch out for in the near future."

In 2010, Costello was an additional material writer of Russell Howard's Good News, a very popular weekly topical comedy series broadcast on BBC3, from 2009 to 2015.

After performing shows in New York, Costello brought the Diamond Comedy Club to Sir Charles Napier, in his hometown of Blackburn. The first show was on 12 March 2017, and included such performers as Archie Kelly (from Phoenix Nights), Daliso Chaponda, Christopher Cantrill, and Harry McLafferty. "Lewis said that the Napier was the perfect venue for the comedy club, having recently re-opened as a community-run pub and venue."

Filmed in an empty theatre, during the Coronavirus pandemic, Costello made an independent short film call Isolated, which appears on YouTube.
