= The Africans (band) =

- Genres: Reggae

The Africans were a Jamaican reggae group of the 1970s, who recorded on the Federal Records and Belmont labels.

== Discography ==
- "Cock Mouth Kill Cock" / Joe Higgs B: "The World Upside Down" - Roosevelt 1971
- "Sleeping in the Rain" / B: "Version" - Federal 1973
- "Why Worry" / B: "Why Worry Version" - Federal 1973
- "Sweet Mary Lou" / B: "Gratitude" - Federal 1973
- "Get Wey De Duck Get" / B: "Quack! Quack!" - Federal 1975
- "Tribulation" / Sky Nation B: "Trial Dub" - High Note Jamaica 1975
- "Gathering" / B: "Version" - Wild Flower Jamaica 1975
- "King of the Congo" / B: "Congo Dub" - High Note Jamaica 1976
- "Cool in Down" / B: "Cool in Version" - High Note 1977
- "Earth Runnings" / B: "Version" - Star Light City Jamaica 1979
- "Kong Pow" / Joe Gibbs and the Professionals B: "Maroon Rock" - Belmont Jamaica 1979
- "Over in Zion" / B: "Version" - Starlight City Jamaica 1979
- "Life in the Ghetto" / B: Ghetto Version - African Records 1980
- "Final Blow" / B: "Final Blow Pt. 2" - Nura Jamaica
