= The Africans (radio program) =

2007 BBC radio program

The Africans is a series of five fifteen-minute programmes broadcast on BBC Radio 4 during 2007, introduced by Nigerian journalist Ken Wiwa, whose father Ken Saro-Wiwa was executed by the Nigerian military government in 1995. The series attempted to give a more positive or different view of Africa than the commonly held pessimistic one, by interviewing "ordinary people doing extraordinary things" in different parts of the continent. The series was produced by Caroline Pare.

The programme interviewed Africans living in Kenya, Ghana, Benin, Nigeria and South Africa and focused on the everyday lives of people working for social change, democratisation and progress in their own local communities.

The series bore a resemblance to Radio 4's Crossing Continents and followed a similar format.
