= The New Goodies LP =

Studio album by The Goodies
- Released: November 1975
- Recorded: June 1975 - July 1975
- Genres: Pop, rock, novelty
- Label: Bradley's
- Producer: Miki Antony

The Goodies chronology
The World of the Goodies	The New Goodies LP	Nothing to Do with Us

The New Goodies LP was the second LP record released by The Goodies. All songs were written by Bill Oddie, except "Wild Thing", which was written by Chip Taylor with adaptation by Oddie. "Baby Samba", "Rock With a Policeman" and "Nappy Love" had previously been written by Oddie for use in I'm Sorry, I'll Read That Again. It was recorded in June and July 1975 at Olympic Studios (although the album cover says it was "recorded almost live at the Cricklewood Rainbow") and produced by Miki Antony. As with their first album, the music was performed mainly by session musicians. Arrangements were by Dave MacRae, with the exception of "Please Let Us Play", "Cricklewood", "Good Ole Country Music", "Baby Samba" and "Nappy Love", which were arranged by Tom Parker.

It was their most successful album, spending 11 weeks on the UK Albums Chart and peaking at #25.

"Goodies Theme", "Funky Gibbon" and "Nappy Love" had been released as singles prior to the album. "Custard Pie" was released as a single in 1976.

"Wild Thing" was used in "The Goodies Rule – O.K.?", broadcast a month after the album was released. Some of the songs on the album were featured on "The Goodies – Almost Live" the following year.

== Track listing ==
Side one
No.	Title	Length
1.	"Goodies Theme" (from the sixth to eighth season title sequences and the beginning of The Goodies Rule - O.K.?. title)	1:59
2.	"Please Let Us Play"	2:55
3.	"Custard Pie"	3:25
4.	"Cricklewood"	2:56
5.	"Good Ole Country Music"	3:47
6.	"Baby Samba"	4:23
7.	"Rock With a Policeman"	3:09

Side two
No.	Title	Length
1.	"The Cricklewood Shakedown"	4:33
2.	"Nappy Love"	3:39
3.	"I'm a Teapot"	3:12
4.	"Working The Line" (From "Bunfight at the O.K. Tea Rooms")	3:19
5.	"Funky Gibbon"	3:25
6.	"Wild Thing"	3:57

== Personnel ==
- Tim Brooke-Taylor – vocals
- Graeme Garden – vocals, banjo
- Bill Oddie – vocals, percussion
- Jackie Sullivan – backing vocals
- Joy Yates – backing vocals
- Sue Lynch – backing vocals
- Alan Parker – guitar
- Bernie Holland – guitar
- Joe Moretti – guitar
- Gordon Huntley – pedal steel guitar
- Brian Odges – bass guitar
- Tony Campo – bass guitar
- Dave MacRae – keyboard
- Tom Parker – keyboard
- Bob Bertles – saxophone
- Chris Hughes – saxophone
- Tony Fisher – trumpet
- Derek Watkins – trumpet
- Geoff Wright – trombone
- Tony Carr – percussion, drums
- Clem Cattini – drums
- Barry Morgan – drums
- Billy Rantim – drums

== See also ==
- The Goodies discography
