= The Goodies Sing Songs From The Goodies =

The Goodies Sing Songs From the Goodies

Studio album by The Goodies
- Released: January 1974 (as The Goodies Sing Songs From the Goodies); May 1975 (as The World of the Goodies)
- Recorded: Mid–late 1973; 28–30 September 1971 ("Sunny Morning"); 17–18 April 1973 ("Taking You Back")
- Studio: Audio International, London; Theater Projects Sound, London; Television Music Studio (Studio H), Lime Grove, BBC ("Sunny Morning" and "Taking You Back")
- Genre: Pop, Rock, Novelty
- Label: Decca
- Producer: Miki Antony

The Goodies chronology
The Goodies Sing Songs From the Goodies (1973)	The New Goodies LP (1975)

The World of the Goodies
- 1975 reissue in Decca's The World of.. series

Singles from The Goodies Sing Songs From the Goodies
- 1. "All Things Bright and Beautiful" B: "Winter Sportsman" Released: 5 October 1973

Singles from The World of the Goodies
- 1. "Stuff That Gibbon" B: "Goodies Theme" Released: 25 April 1975

The Goodies Sing Songs From the Goodies was the 1974 debut LP record released by The Goodies. It was initially issued in January 1974 as The Goodies Sing Songs From the Goodies (Decca catalogue number SKL 5175), and was then later reissued in May 1975, retitled as The World of the Goodies with a different cover picture (Decca catalogue number SPA 416), as part of Decca's extensive World Of... series.

The album consisted mainly of re-recordings of songs that Bill Oddie had originally composed as incidental music for the TV series. It was produced by Miki Antony "despite interference from Bill Oddie". All songs were written by Oddie, with the exception of "Sparrow Song" (written by Graeme Garden) and "All Things Bright and Beautiful". The music was performed mainly by session musicians.

"Taking You Back" was arranged by Mike Gibbs, the musical director for The Goodies, and was taken directly from the soundtrack from the episode "Camelot" rather than being re-recorded.

Originally, Oddie intended to include a version of "Land of Hope and Glory" (from the episode "The Stolen Musicians") but ran into licensing problems with the song. "All Things Bright and Beautiful", a rock arrangement by Oddie and Andrew Jackman of the well-known hymn, was included instead.

== Track listing ==
Side one
No.	Title	Length
1.	"All Things Bright and Beautiful"	3:00
2.	"Ride My Pony" (From "Hunting Pink")	3:45
3.	"Stuff That Gibbon" (From "That Old Black Magic")	2:33
4.	"Mummy I Don't Like My Meat" (From "Superstar")	3:01
5.	"Show Me the Way" (From "Snooze")	4:43

Side two
No.	Title	Length
1.	"Goodies Theme" (From the third and fourth season title sequences)	3:20
2.	"Sparrow Song" (From "Superstar")	0:44
3.	"Taking You Back" (From "Camelot")	4:00
4.	"Sunny Morning" (Recorded originally for Series 2, Episodes 9-13 but unused)	3:25
5.	"Winter Sportsman" (From "Winter Olympics")	2:42
6.	"Spacehopper" (From "Charity Bounce")	5:01

== Personnel ==
- Tim Brooke-Taylor – vocals
- Graeme Garden – vocals
- Bill Oddie – vocals, percussion, penny whistle
- Gary Boyle – lead guitar (on "Taking You Back")
- Mike Morgan – lead guitar
- Eric Ford – rhythm guitar
- Brian Cole – steel guitar
- Les Hurdle – bass guitar
- Chris Spedding – bass guitar (on "Taking You Back")
- Andrew Jackman – keyboard
- John Mitchell – keyboard (on "Sunny Morning")
- Dave MacRae – keyboard
- Pete Zorn – alto saxophone
- Don Harper – violin
- Tony Carr – percussion
- John Marshall – drums (on "Taking You Back")
- Clem Cattini – drums

== See also ==
- The Goodies discography
