= Nothing to Do with Us =

Studio album by The Goodies
- Released: November 1976
- Genre: Pop, Rock, Blues, Novelty
- Label: Island Records
- Producer: Dave MacRae, Bill Oddie

The Goodies chronology
The New Goodies LP	Nothing to Do with Us	Beastly Record

Professional ratings
Review scores
Source	Rating
Sounds	4/5 stars

Nothing to Do with Us was the third LP record released by The Goodies. All songs were written by Bill Oddie. As with their previous albums, the music was performed mainly by session musicians. For this album, The Goodies were signed to Island Records which had worldwide distribution rights except for the United States.

"She Wouldn't Understand" was recorded at Morgan Studios. Other rhythm tracks were recorded at Roundhouse and all other tracks recorded at Basing Street Studios.

"Cactus In My Y-fronts" had originally been written for I'm Sorry, I'll Read That Again and used in "The Goodies – Almost Live". "Elizabeth Rules UK" was released as a single.

== Track listing ==
Side one
No.	Title	Length
1.	"The Policeman's Opera" (A major Work in four parts-with a few bits inbetween); Overture-"Pig's Lament..."; Dreadcop's Comin'; Third Bit; Photofit Love; Aria-"She Does Not Exist"; Rhapsody In Blue; Finale)	11:36
2.	"Cactus In My Y-fronts"	2:59
3.	"Elizabeth Rules-U.K."	5:53

Side two
No.	Title	Length
1.	"Blowing Off"	3:26
2.	"I Wish I Could Get High"	4:06
3.	"Synthesizer Man"	4:08
4.	"She Wouldn't Understand"	5:40
5.	"I Wish I Had Something To Say"	3:24

== Personnel ==
- Tim Brooke-Taylor – vocals
- Graeme Garden – vocals
- Bill Oddie – vocals, percussion, arranger, conductor
- Jackie Sullivan – backing vocals
- Joy Yates – backing vocals
- Tony Burrows – backing vocals
- Charlie Dore – backing vocals
- Stevie Lang – backing vocals
- Chas Mills – backing vocals
- Russell Stone – backing vocals
- Ray Flacke – guitar
- Bernie Holland – guitar
- Alan Parker – guitar
- Chris Rae – guitar
- Billy Kristian – bass guitar, artificial flatulence
- Brian Odges – bass guitar
- Dave MacRae – keyboards, percussion
- Ron Aspery – saxophone
- Geoff Daley – saxophone
- John Huckridge – trumpet
- Paul Kosh – trumpet
- Henry Lowther – trumpet
- Derek Watkins – trumpet
- Chris Pyne – trombone
- Geoff Wright – trombone
- Graham Preskett – violin
- Tony Carr – drums
- The David Katz Strings

== See also ==
- The Goodies discography
