= Nappy Love =

Single by The Goodies

from the album The New Goodies LP
- A-side: "Nappy Love"
- B-side: "Wild Thing"
- Released: 12 September 1975
- Genre: Pop, Novelty
- Length: 3:39
- Label: Bradley's Records
- Songwriter(s): Bill Oddie
- Producer(s): Miki Antony

The Goodies singles chronology
| "Black Pudding Bertha" | "Nappy Love" | "Make a Daft Noise for Christmas" |

Nappy Love is a song by Bill Oddie and recorded by The Goodies. It was arranged by Tom Parker and released as a single in September 1975. The B-side was a version of "Wild Thing", arranged by Dave MacRae.

Oddie originally wrote the song in 1973 for use in the radio series I'm Sorry, I'll Read That Again, where it was performed in the episode broadcast on 9 December of that year.

It entered the UK Singles Chart on 27 September 1975 at #37, remaining in the chart for 6 weeks and peaking at #21.

The Goodies performed the song live in The Goodies – Almost Live.
