= The Goodies discography =

- Studio albums: 4
- Extended plays: 1
- Compilation albums: 5
- Singles: 12

This is a listing of official albums and singles released by the British comedy trio The Goodies, composed of Tim Brooke-Taylor (1940-2020), Graeme Garden (b.1943) and Bill Oddie (1941-2026).

== Studio albums ==
Year	Title	Format	Peak chart position
1974	The Goodies Sing Songs From The Goodies, (reissued as The World of the Goodies)	LP	—
1975	The World of the Goodies (reissue of The Goodies Sing Songs From The Goodies)	LP	—
1975	The New Goodies LP	LP	25 (UK)
1976	Nothing To Do With Us	LP	—
1978	Beastly Record	LP	—

== Compilation albums ==
Year	Title	Format	Peak chart position
1976	The Goodies Greatest	LP	—
1976	The Best of the Goodies	LP	—
1981	The Goodies Greatest Hits	LP	—
1987	Yum Yum! The Very Best of the Goodies	CD	—
2000	Funky Gibbon – The Best of the Goodies	CD	—

== EPs ==
Year	Title	Peak chart position
1978	A Man's Best Friend Is His Duck / Taking My Oyster For Walkies / Rastashanty	—

== Singles ==
Year	Title	Format	Peak chart position	
Year	Title	Format	UK	US
1973	"All Things Bright and Beautiful"	7"	—	—
1973	"Goodies Theme"	7"	—	—
1974	"The Inbetweenies"	7"	7	—
1974	"Father Christmas Do Not Touch Me"	7"	—	—
1975	"Goodies Theme" (reissue)	7"	—	—
1975	"The Funky Gibbon"	7"	4	79
1975	"Black Pudding Bertha (The Queen of Northern Soul)"	7"	19	—
1975	"Nappy Love"	7"	21	—
1975	"Make a Daft Noise for Christmas"	7"	20	—
1976	"Bounce"	7"	—	—
1976	"Custard Pie"	7"	—	—
1976	"Elizabeth Rules UK"	7"	—	—
1978	"M*I*C*K*E*Y M*O*U*S*E"	7"	—	—

== See also ==
- The Goodies
- The Goodies (TV series)
- The Goodies videography — the Goodies on DVD and VHS
- List of The Goodies episodes
