= It Might as Well Be String =

- The Goodies episode
- Episode no.: Series 6 Episode 5
- Original air date: 19 October 1976

Guest appearances
- Raymond Baxter as himself (television presenter for Tomorrow's World); Marcelle Samett as Girl in the String advertisement; Valerie Leon as Karate girl

Episode chronology
← Previous "Black and White Beauty"	Next → "2001 & A Bit"

"It Might as Well Be String" is an episode of the British comedy television series The Goodies.

Written by Graeme Garden and Bill Oddie with songs and music by Bill Oddie.

== Plot ==
The Goodies have become Advertising Men and Graeme reads from a blackboard with the letters 'A', 'B', 'C' and 'D' written on it, and showing what is written about each letter — from 'D' to 'A'):

- D is for 'Dumb' — (housewives – bless them)
- C is for 'Clever'
- B is for 'Brilliant'
- A is for 'Advertising men'

Tim ('TBT') tells the others: "From today 'BO', 'GG' — save time — call you 'BOGG'."

When Bill & Graeme take charge of the ad campaigns, Tim is horrified at the lies they tell about the products they advertise, in mainly cruel and offensive ads made to threaten and bully housewives and their families. He wants them to advertise truth, because he is of the opinion that honesty is the miracle ingredient, but Bill and Graeme disagree with Tim's opinion. After sales figures plummet following truth in ads, The Goodies come up with other product options. Tim suggests that String is a pure, wholesome product, and Bill and Graeme agree to exploit it.

Later, Tim watches his favourite television programme Tomorrow's World, and is again horrified — this time because string is a failure as a product. He then discovers that some mysterious men are making a lot of money by keeping a stockpile of string, so that the world is dependent on them. Eventually, Tim learns that Graeme and Bill are the men behind the scheme. Tim is furious and intends to put Graeme's and Bill's string empire out of business. However, along the way he runs into many obstacles — including Bill and Graeme, themselves.

== Song written by Bill Oddie ==
- "Everybody Loves String" — sung by Bill, Tim and Graeme

== Cultural references ==
- Tomorrow's World
- Mr. Kipling's "exceedingly good" cakes
- Manikin cigars
- Condor pipe tobacco: "That string moment"
- 1970s Milk Tray
- Hai Karate after shave (the original star of these ads, Valerie Leon, is in this episode of The Goodies)
- Captain Birdseye fish fingers
- Minced Morsels dog food ads, with Clement Freud
- the inevitable Heinz Baked Beans boy adverts (seen in previous series of The Goodies)
- During the climax, Bill Oddie starts running in slow motion and performs a giant leap down from a tree to hand Tim Brooke Taylor a bomb in a shoebox. This was an overt nod to the bionic action of the Lee Majors series The Six Million Dollar Man, which was hugely popular at the time.

== DVD and VHS releases ==
This episode has been released on DVD.
