= If I Ruled the World (game show) =

- Genre: Gameshow comedy
- Created by: Richard Osman
- Presented by: Clive Anderson
- Starring: Graeme Garden; Jeremy Hardy
- Theme music composer: Dave Hewson
- Country of origin: United Kingdom
- Original language: English
- No. of series: 2
- No. of episodes: 14

Production
- Production company: Hat Trick Productions

Original release
- Network: BBC Two
- Release: 27 February 1998 – 29 March 1999

Related
- Parlamentet

If I Ruled the World is a television show aired in the United Kingdom in 1998 and 1999. It was a comedy panel game show, similar to Have I Got News for You but focused on parodying the behaviour of politicians. Rounds included answering questions without using the words 'Yes' or 'No', and finding reasons to disagree with policies proposed by the other team, no matter how sensible. The winning team was chosen each week by a vote of the studio audience. The show was named after the 1960s theatre song "If I Ruled the World".

The show was presented by Clive Anderson. Team captains Graeme Garden and Jeremy Hardy were the Blue and Red Party Leaders, with Anderson quipping that there was no more of an official political difference between these two teams than existed between Britain's major parties of the time. "I was supposed to be a Labour politician, and Graeme was supposed to be a Tory, but we didn't have to stay completely in character if we wanted to sort of shamelessly do gags," recounts Hardy, who affected the far more absurdly right-wing of the two characters, an extremely wealthy aristocrat disdainful toward the voters and infrequently heard to advocate a coup.

Repeat guests included Rebecca Front, Andy Hamilton, Tony Hawks, Fred MacAulay and Pauline McLynn, with Hawks deputizing for Jeremy during his one absence. Other guests included frequent Hardy collaborators Mark Steel, Gordon Kennedy and Linda Smith, and also journalists John Sergeant and Janet Street-Porter. Maureen Lipman was advertised to appear in the fourth episode although McLynn appeared in her stead. The series was produced by Anne Marie Thorogood and Richard Osman for Hat Trick Productions.

== Rounds ==
Several rounds were played throughout the programme's run:

- Soapbox, usually played as the first round, where the panellists voice their opinions on a pre-selected matter of topical interest.
- It's A Stickup, where the teams are shown their campaign posters and are asked to explain them. The posters would be of a rather dubious nature.
- The Yes/No Round, where Clive tested the panellist's abilities to avoid answering political questions with a straight answer, i.e. without saying the words "Yes" or "No" at any point. If at any point they said either of those words a buzzer would sound and that person would be eliminated from the round. Graeme loved to fool the buzzer by starting sentences with "Yes..terday" or "No..body...".
- It's Really Very Simple, where Clive receives leaked documents on each of the party leaders, who then have to justify their actions.
- The Pager Round, where Clive interviewed Graeme and Jeremy on a certain topic. However, during the interviews, both Graeme and Jeremy were given messages via their pagers from their "spin doctors" who monitored the interviews, and had to adapt to the instructions given. The pager message appeared at the bottom of the screen. For example, in one episode Jeremy was asked about teacher's pay, but received messages telling him to make up a statistic, attack Graeme's record (which Jeremy decided to take literally and attacked The Goodies' "Funky Gibbon"), draw on his Irish roots before denying what he'd just said, compare himself to Jesus and finish with a joke, while Graeme was quizzed on genetically modified foods, while he received edicts to smile, provoke Clive, use an extended metaphor (for which Graeme referred to Eric Cantona's infamous "sardines" statement), mention Margaret Thatcher and Carol Vorderman in quick succession before ending with a quote from Casablanca.
- Speech, which is played by only one panellist, who is given a speech by Clive to recite to the audience. However, the speech text is something very strange such as football chants or lyrics from a song.
- I Like To Keep In Touch, where Clive asked Jeremy and Graeme a series of questions over a period of 90 seconds each on different subjects.
- State Of The Nation, where the audience were polled on a series of questions and each panellist was asked what the most popular answer was. Upon revealing the answer, Clive would reveal the rest of the top three and some of the more ridiculous answers given by the audience. This round replaced Soapbox as the first round in the second series.
- Hidden Agenda, where an audience member asked the panel a question, and Graeme and Jeremy had to respond to the question, but each had a hidden agenda (presented to them in an envelope by Clive). For example, an audience member asked how space travel would be affected following the finding of water on the Moon. Graeme had to answer while pushing the hidden agenda of the Countryside Alliance and Jeremy with the agenda of the musicals of Sir Andrew Lloyd Webber.
- Reshuffle, where the teams are confronted with numbered squares, each one hiding a celebrity, and have to justify their additions to their respective Cabinets. For example, Jeremy's team had to justify the additions of Reggie Kray and Robbie Williams, while Graeme's team had to justify the additions of Jeremy Clarkson and Adolf Hitler.
- Time for Questions, loosely based on Question Time, where the teams fielded questions from the studio audience on various subjects. One episode included a question from an audience member asking the teams if "the big white cat" which appeared in The Goodies was proof that genetically modified foods had existed for decades, to which Graeme responded that it "proved that gullible members of the public have been around for decades."
- I Couldn't Disagree More, where either Graeme or Jeremy had to disagree with any policies the other party threw at them, however reasonable they may sound. A famous example was when Tim Brooke-Taylor appeared as a guest and he proposed "that it was high time The Goodies episodes were repeated. Graeme was obliged by the rules of the game to refute this statement, and replied "I couldn't disagree more, it was time to repeat them on television ten, fifteen years ago." This was followed by uproarious applause from the studio audience.
- Desperate Vote Grabbing, which was always the last round, where the panellists would buzz in to give out last-minute policies to sway the audience before the division bell and the final vote.

== Discontinuation ==
The decision to discontinue the show was that of BBC2 controller Jane Root, who (based on interviews with Garden and Hardy) "allegedly accepted it was a great show, but [felt it] didn't fit ... the direction BBC2 should be headed," and is also widely credited with the decision that Garden's most well-known programme, The Goodies, "would never be repeated on the BBC."

== Episode list ==
Fourteen episodes of the series were broadcast in all, airing weekly from 27 February to 3 April 1998 and from 8 February to 29 March 1999.

The coloured backgrounds denote the result of each of the shows:

– indicates Graeme's team won.
– indicates Jeremy's team won.

=== Series 1 ===
Episode	First broadcast	Graeme's guest	Jeremy's guest	Votes (%)
1x01	27 February 1998	Maria McErlane	Tony Hawks	75–25
1x02	6 March 1998	Fred MacAulay	Rebecca Front	56–44
1x03	13 March 1998	Greg Proops	Tim Brooke-Taylor	52–48
1x04	20 March 1998	Gordon Kennedy	Pauline McLynn	57–43
1x05	27 March 1998	Andy Hamilton	Richard Wilson	45–55
1x06	3 April 1998	Mark Steel	Doon Mackichan	71–29

=== Series 2 ===
Episode	First broadcast	Graeme's guest	Jeremy's guest	Votes (%)
2x01	8 February 1999	Tony Hawks	Rebecca Front	65–35
2x02	15 February 1999	Griff Rhys Jones	Will Self	51–49
2x03	22 February 1999	John Thomson	Linda Smith	51–49
2x04	1 March 1999	Pauline McLynn	Hugh Dennis	60–40
2x05	8 March 1999	Janet Street-Porter	Tony Hawks	78–22
2x06	15 March 1999	Fred MacAulay	Rebecca Front	51–49
2x07	22 March 1999	Sue Perkins	Tony Hawks, (Note: Hawks replaced Jeremy Hardy as team captain for this episode.) Hugh Dennis	51–49
2x08	29 March 1999	Andy Hamilton	John Sergeant (Note: Radio Times lists these as the two guests, although it does not specify team assignments, and gives erroneous guest listings for several other episodes.)	54-46

== International editions ==
- Parlamentet, the long running Swedish version of the game show
- Parlamentet, same concept as the Swedish version, run for one season in Denmark at TV3 in 2003
- Løvebakken (lit. "The Lion Hill", named for a nickname of the Norwegian parliament), the Norwegian version, hosted by comedian Øystein Bache
