= Dodonuts =

- The Goodies episode
- Episode no.: Series 7 Episode 2
- Original air date: 8 November 1977

Guest appearances
- Percy Edwards as the voice of the Dodo; Barney Carroll as a hunter; Rocky Newby as a hunter; Eddie Davis as a hunter; Ernie Goodyear as a hunter; Bill Gosling as the Club Butler; Jimmy Mac; James Muir

Episode chronology
← Previous "Alternative Roots"	Next → "Scoutrageous"

"Dodonuts" is an episode of the British comedy television series The Goodies.

Written by Graeme Garden and Bill Oddie and music by Bill Oddie.

== Plot ==
Bill is upset when he discovers that Tim and Graeme have become over-obsessive and loony hunters. Tim and Graeme belong to the Endangered Species Club. They are especially interested in hunting endangered species and non-endangered species like farm animals, urban animals, local animals and domestic animals because the small numbers make them hard to find. On the other hand, Tim and Graeme consider that common species animals and birds are too abundant and therefore far too easy to hunt.

Later, Graeme finds a dodo (the last one in existence) in a pet shop, and brings it home to Bill, who then has to keep the bird safe from the other two. Tim asks Graeme about the price of the dodo: "Was it going cheap?" "No," said Graeme, "it was going ERRRRKKKK!!!"

When Bill teaches the dodo how to fly (for the dodo's own protection), the method of flight is rather unusual for a bird.
