= 2001 & A Bit =

- The Goodies episode
- Episode no.: Series 6 Episode 6
- Original air date: 26 October 1976

Guest appearance
- Oliver Gilbert as Jimmy Hill

Episode chronology
← Previous "It Might as Well Be String"	Next → "The Goodies – Almost Live"

"2001 & A Bit" is an episode of the British comedy television series The Goodies.

This episode is also known as "The Future of the Goodies", with the Goodies playing both their elderly selves, and versions of each other.

Written by Graeme Garden and Bill Oddie , with music by Bill Oddie.

== Prologue and profiles ==
The Goodies have gone their separate ways.

After all three Goodies had separate encounters with the same model, she gave birth to triplets. Tim, showing a photo of the triplets to his son, comments that, because they were not sure who was the father of the babies, the Goodies each took one — then, glancing at his son, Tim comments: "... sometimes I think we might have made a mistake......".

The Goodies' sons are:

- Bill Brooke-Taylor — played by Bill Oddie

Tim's son Bill resembles Bill Oddie, but he is similar in nature to Tim Brooke-Taylor.
Bill Brooke-Taylor wears similar conservative clothes to Tim, including wearing a Union Jack waistcoat.
Bill Brooke-Taylor also makes patriotic speeches to the music of "Land of Hope and Glory"

(Tim comments that his son, Bill, is a credit to the Brooke-Taylors – a right little crawler).

- Graeme Oddie — played by Graeme Garden

Bill's son Graeme resembles Graeme Garden, but he acts very much like Bill Oddie.
Graeme Oddie, who is an eccentric and violent sportsman, wears sports clothes.

- Tim Garden — played by Tim Brooke-Taylor

Graeme's son Tim resembles Tim Brooke-Taylor, but his interests are similar to those of Graeme Garden.
Tim Garden is vague and thoughtful, and has an interest in science, and wears clothes similar to Graeme Garden.

== Plot ==
It is a more permissive era, and life has become dull and boring for the world at large. Since everything is now permitted, nothing is exciting, and even the popular violent spectator sport of "rollerball" is treated as passé. Jimmy Hill, who is now a very old man with a long beard, greets sports on his programme with the same level of boredom as the rest of the population.

The New Goodies, led by Bill Brooke-Taylor, want to add some excitement to the lives of the people, and to get them excited about something again. In the attempt to add more excitement to 'rollerball', Graeme Oddie (a leading competitor of violent sports), and some of his equally violent friends, modify the game to 'rolleregg', a combination of an egg and spoon race and 'rollerball'. Graeme Oddie is the leading competitor for 'rolleregg'.

Bill Brooke-Taylor wants to resurrect the ancient game of Cricket, with the idea that something, which is truly boring, might be enough of a novelty to be interesting to the population. He asks his father, Tim, about the MCC. Tim decides to take his son to the retirement home for old cricketers the "MCC Sanctuary'", where Bill and Graeme are now residing in their old age. To travel to the retirement home, both Tim and his son, Bill, wear automatic motorised shoes.

At Lord's Cricket Ground, Tim Garden finds a tiny urn full of ashes in a cupboard. Assuming that the urn was full of dust, Tim Garden empties the ashes onto the floor. Then, he finds a discarded cricket box, and, assuming that it is a hat of some sort, he places it on his head. Tim Garden also puts the stumps and cricket bat to a new and novel use.

With help from the former members of the MCC, cricket is revived, and the commentators for the match are Bill Brooke-Taylor, Tim Garden, and a robot. However, people who go to a cricket match to find out what it is like, become quickly bored — they have been reared on far more violent games. Bill and Tim then receive a message from Graeme, who has found out about the cricket match and intends to do something. The ‘roller egg’ team comes onto the pitch to play against the MCC and for the first time, the crowd becomes excited, so the Goodies have succeeded.

After being continually struck on the body with cricket balls bowled by the cricket players, the humiliated "rolleregg" players decide to use an enormous robot to bat from, but they are still defeated by the MCC members. After a final searing victory against Graeme Oddie by the aging Tim and Bill, the MCC members inherit the Earth and retain "the Ashes" — and the MCC members are still marching on – somewhere.

== Poem ==
Bill Brooke-Taylor:

There's a deathly hush at Lord's tonight,
The pitch lies covered in weeds,
Willow and leather crack no more together,
But that's what the country needs.
We'll show them all with bat and ball,
In spite of our lumbago,
We're not caught out by Frog or Kraut,
Nor greasy Wop nor Dago.
If you're one who plays for five long days,
Trying desperately to draw,
If you stop each ball like a concrete wall,
'Till they let out a mighty snore,
If you can run a gallant one
Between 10 AM and tea,
But above all, if you can bore 'em stiff,
You're the pride of the MCC!

== Song ==
"The MCC Song" was first used in a 1970 episode of I'm Sorry, I'll Read That Again.

== Cultural references ==
- Jimmy Hill — who was a genuine commentator for BBC's Match of the Day.
- Rollerball
- Egg and spoon race
- Cricket
- The Ashes
- MCC
- Tim holds up copies of the Beano and the Dandy, popular children's comics of the era (and still going strong), with their mastheads changed to read 'Porno' and 'Randy', in keeping with the permissive times.

== DVD and VHS releases ==
This episode has been released on DVD.
