= The Goodies – Almost Live =

- The Goodies episode
- Episode no.: Series 6 Episode 7
- Directed by: Jim Franklin
- Original air date: 2 November 1976

Guest appearances
- Musical director: Dave MacRae; Musicians: Ron Aspery; Simon Burns; Paul Keogh; Richie Hitchcock; Chris Mercer; Barry Morgan; Brian Odges; Alan Parker; Graham Prestcott; Chris Rae; Backing vocals: Jacquie Sullivan; Joy Yates

Episode chronology
← Previous "2001 & A Bit"	Next → "Alternative Roots"

"The Goodies – Almost Live" is an episode of the British comedy television series The Goodies.

This episode, which takes the form of a pop concert, is also known as "The Goodies in Concert".

The Goodies also appear as "Pan's Grannies".

Songs and music by Bill Oddie.

== Songs ==
The songs, featured in the show (in chronological order), are:

Song title	Announced / Introduced by	Sung by (Goodies' singers mentioned only)	Notes
The Goodies Theme	Graeme	Bill (accompanied by Tim and Graeme)	Series 6 to 8 theme.
Please Let Us Play	—	Tim, Bill and Graeme	From The New Goodies LP.
Good Ole Country Music	—	Graeme as a 'Cowboy' (Dog and Chicken sounds: courtesy of Bill)	From The New Goodies LP and later released on the B-side of Bounce.
Cactus in my Y-Fronts	Graeme	Tim as the 'Midnight Cowperson' (accompanied by Bill and Graeme)	Originally written for I'm Sorry, I'll Read That Again and included on Nothing to Do with Us.
Poor Old Soul and Funky Chicken	—	Bill, Graeme and Tim	
Funky Gibbon	—	Bill, Graeme and Tim	Released as a single in 1975 and included on The New Goodies LP.
Sick Man Blues	Graeme	Bill and Tim (Graeme hands out paper bags to audience)	Originally written for I'm Sorry, I'll Read That Again.
The Inbetweenies	—	Bill (accompanied by Tim and Graeme)	Released as a single in 1974.
Black Pudding Bertha	—	Bill (accompanied by Tim and Graeme)	Released as a single the previous year.
Nappy Love	—	Bill (accompanied by Tim and Graeme — and their hand puppets)	Originally written for I'm Sorry, I'll Read That Again. Released as a single in 1975 and included on The New Goodies LP.
Bounce	Tim	Bill (accompanied by Tim and Graeme)	From "The Goodies Rule – O.K.?" and released as a single earlier in 1976.
The Last Chance Dance	—	Bill (Tim demonstrates the song with a girl)	Released on the B-side of Make a Daft Noise for Christmas in 1975.
Wild Thing	—	Bill (accompanied by Tim and Graeme)	Released on the B-side of Nappy Love, included on The New Goodies LP and used in "The Goodies Rule – O.K.?".
The Goodies Theme	—	Bill (accompanied by Tim and Graeme)	
