= Bananaman (TV series) =

British animated television series (1983–1988)

- Title card
- Genre: Superhero; Comedy
- Written by: Bernie Kay
- Directed by: Terry Ward
- Starring: Tim Brooke-Taylor; Graeme Garden; Bill Oddie; Jill Shilling
- Composer: Dave Cooke
- Country of origin: United Kingdom
- Original language: English
- No. of series: 3
- No. of episodes: 40

Production
- Producer: Trevor Bond
- Cinematography: Stephen Williams
- Editor: Morgan Daniels Limited
- Running time: 5 minutes
- Production companies: Beano Productions; 101 Productions

Original release
- Network: BBC 1
- Release: 3 October 1983 – 15 June 1988

Bananaman is a British animated comedy series which ran from 3 October 1983 to 15 June 1988. It was based on the comic strip character Bananaman from the DC Thomson comic Nutty, and directed and produced by Terry Ward and Trevor Bond at 101 Productions. The show ran for 40 five-minute episodes, each of which featured the voices of The Goodies (Tim Brooke-Taylor, Graeme Garden and Bill Oddie) and Jill Shilling. The soundtrack was composed by Dave Cooke.

Parts of the character Eric Wimp were changed for the series: he was now called Eric Twinge, had a distinctive banana-shaped hairstyle rather than being bald (like he was in the first few years in the comic), and had a love interest (only when transformed) in the form of Fiona, a newsreader, based on Selina Scott.

"This is 29 Acacia Road. And this is Eric, the schoolboy who leads an amazing double life. For when Eric eats a banana, an amazing transformation occurs. Eric is Bananaman, ever alert for the call to action!"

— opening narration

When Danger Mouse first aired on Nickelodeon in America, Bananaman was shown after it to round out the show to a half hour.

== Cast ==
- Tim Brooke-Taylor as Eric, King Zorg of the Nerks, Eddie the Gent, Auntie, Appleman, Narrator and additional voices
- Graeme Garden as Bananaman, General Blight, Maurice of The Heavy Mob and additional voices
- Bill Oddie as Crow, Chief O'Reilly, Doctor Gloom, the Weatherman and additional voices
- Jill Shilling as Fiona, Mother Nerk, Samantha and additional voices

== Series guide ==
- Series 1: 3 October – 11 November 1983 – 12 episodes
- Series 2: 4 October – 19 December 1984 – 13 episodes
- Series 3: 7 January – 15 April 1986 – 15 episodes

"Memory Lane" episode from series 2 was not broadcast until June 1988 but was made alongside series 2.

== Episodes ==
=== Series 1 (1983) ===
No. overall	Series no.	Title	Original air date
1	1	"Bananaman Meets Dr. Gloom"	3 October 1983
2	2	"The Big Breakout"	7 October 1983
3	3	"Ice Station Zero"	10 October 1983
4	4	"The Alien Planet"	14 October 1983
5	5	"The Kidnap Caper"	17 October 1983
6	6	"House on Hangman's Hill"	20 October 1983
7	7	"Destination Danger"	24 October 1983
8	8	"Wall of Death"	27 October 1983
9	9	"Jaws of Steel"	31 October 1983
10	10	"Banana Kid"	4 November 1983
11	11	"Auntie's Back in Town"	7 November 1983
12	12	"Tunnel of Terror"	11 November 1983

=== Series 2 (1984) ===
No. overall	Series no.	Title	Original air date
13	1	"Mystery at the Old Mine"	4 October 1984
14	2	"Lost Tribe of the Tapiocas"	11 October 1984
15	3	"Trouble at the Mill"	18 October 1984
16	4	"The Web of Evil"	25 October 1984
17	5	"The Mummy's Curse"	1 November 1984
18	6	"The Night Patrol"	8 November 1984
19	7	"Fog of Fear"	15 November 1984
20	8	"A Tank Full of Trouble"	22 November 1984
21	9	"Double Trouble"	29 November 1984
22	10	"The Last Banana"	5 December 1984
23	11	"Intergalactic Olympics"	12 December 1984
24	12	"Memory Lane"	15 June 1988
25	13	"The Final Orbit"	19 December 1984

=== Series 3 (1986) ===
No. overall	Series no.	Title	Original air date
26	1	"Disaster at Devil's Cove"	7 January 1986
27	2	"Night of the Nerks"	14 January 1986
28	3	"The Snowman Cometh"	21 January 1986
29	4	"Pirate TV Station"	28 January 1986
30	5	"Battle of the Bridge"	4 February 1986
31	6	"Harbour of Lost Ships"	11 February 1986
32	7	"Visibility Zero"	18 February 1986
33	8	"Battle of the Century"	25 February 1986
34	9	"The Perils of Ping Pong"	4 March 1986
35	10	"The Great Air Race"	11 March 1986
36	11	"Cavern of the Lost"	18 March 1986
37	12	"Clown Capers"	25 March 1986
38	13	"Banana Junction"	1 April 1986
39	14	"The Crown Jewel Caper"	8 April 1986
40	15	"Operation Total"	15 April 1986
