= Percy Edwards =

British voice actor and ornithologist (1908–1996)

Percy Edwards MBE
- Edwards on Morecambe and Wise
- Born: 1 June 1908; Ipswich, Suffolk, England
- Died: 7 June 1996 (aged 88); Hintlesham, Suffolk, England
- Occupations: Animal impersonator; entertainer; ornithologist

Percy Edwards MBE (1 June 1908 – 7 June 1996) was an English animal impersonator, entertainer and ornithologist.

== Biography ==
When he was a child, bird impressions were often done with the assistance of hands on the mouth, however he was able to do them without. During the Second World War, Edwards worked at Ransomes, Sims & Jefferies in Ipswich.

Edwards became a household name after playing Psyche the dog in the radio series A Life of Bliss, which he reprised for its television adaptation. He was appointed Member of the Order of the British Empire (MBE) in 1993 for services to ornithology and entertainment. In 2009, Sir David Attenborough presented a special BBC radio panel game, The Percy Edwards Showdown, dedicated to Edwards's life and career. He is buried in the churchyard of St Mary's, Polstead, Suffolk.

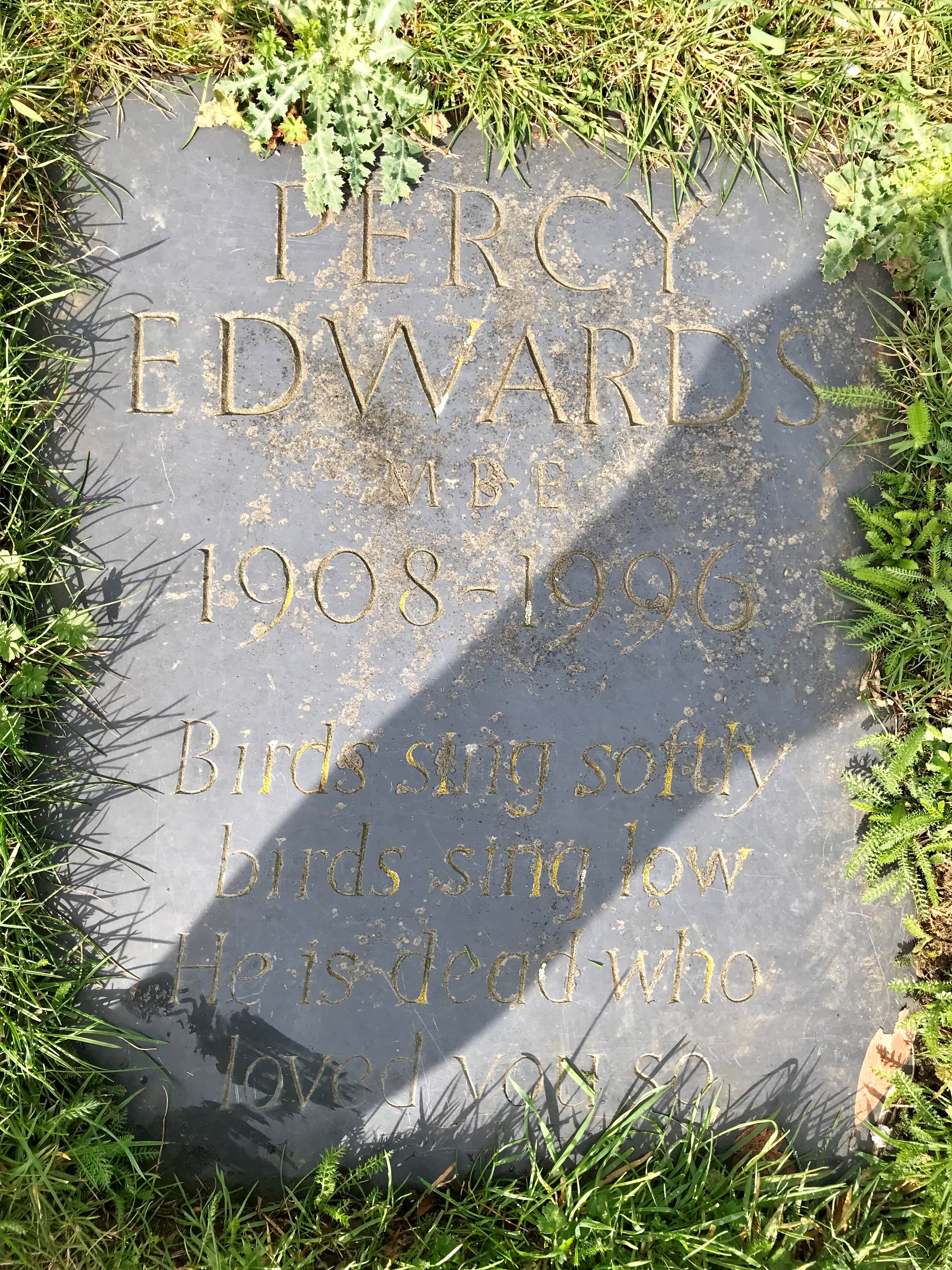
The grave of Percy Edwards in the churchyard of St Mary, Polstead, Suffolk

== Filmography ==
Year	Title	Role	Notes
1960-1961	A Life of Bliss	Psyche the Dog	10 episodes
1965	Pet Pals	Animal Sounds	6 episodes
1966	Hugh and I	Voices	Episode “Hold That Tiger”
1971	The Rise and Rise of Michael Rimmer	Bird impersonator	Film
1971	On the Buses	Bird Impressions	Episode “The Kids’ Outing”
1972	His Lordship Entertains	Voices	Episode 4 “The Safari Park”
1973	The Morecambe and Wise Show	Jungle Sounds	1 episode
1976	Wodehouse Playhouse	Bird Imitations	Episode “The Nodder”
1976	The End of the Pier Show	Various	Episode “The 9.36 to Didcot”
1976	The Good Life	Animal Noises	Episode “The Happy Event”
1977	The Goodies	The Dodo	Episode “Dodonuts”
1979	Alien	Alien Voices	Film, uncredited
1981	Hi-de-Hi!	Bubbles	Episode 7 “No Dogs Allowed”
1981	The Ark Stories	Animal Sounds	11 episodes
1981	The Island of Adventure	Kiki	Film
1982	The Plague Dogs	Animal Vocalisations	Film
1982	The Dark Crystal	Fizzgig	Film
1983	Fair Ground!	Captain Cutlass	9 episodes
1983	Androcles and the Lion	The Lion's Voice	TV movie
1984-1985	Hilary	Arthur	4 episodes
1985	In the Shadow of Kilimanjaro	Baboon Voices	Film
1986	Sorry!	The Duck	Episode “My Family and Other Monsters”
1986	Labyrinth	Ambrosius	Film
1988	Bad Boyes	Joey the Budgie	Episode “The Holiday”

== Bibliography ==
- Call Me at Dawn (1948)
- The Birdman's Pocket Book (1954)
- The Road I Travelled (1979)
- Country Book (1981)
- Song Birds (1986)
