= Alternative Roots =

- The Goodies episode
- Episode no.: Series 7 Episode 1
- Original air date: 1 November 1977

Guest appearances
- Bryan Pringle as Tourmaster; Charlie Stewart; Stuart Fell; Max Faulkner; John Melainey; Brian Rogers; Kenneth Warwick; The Fred Tomlinson Singers

Episode chronology
← Previous "The Goodies – Almost Live"	Next → "Dodonuts"

"Alternative Roots" is an episode of the British comedy television series The Goodies.

This episode is also known as "The Goodies Find Their Roots" and "Hoots, Toots and Froots".

Written by Graeme Garden and Bill Oddie and music by Bill Oddie.

== Prologue ==
During the episode, the Goodies also appear as their ancestors:

- Tim Brooke-Taylor also appears as 'Kounty Kutie'
- Graeme Garden also appears as 'Keltic Kilty'
- Bill Oddie also appears as 'Kinda Kinky'

== Plot ==
The Goodies tell of the time when their ancestors were young men, and how their ancestors met for the first time.

Graeme's family were Highlanders who lived in bleak conditions in Scotland, where initiation of the young men of the village included being dunked in porridge and catching a wild haggis. Bill's West Country family sold fruit. Tim, whose ancestors were also English, concludes that they were noble, because the family had its own coat of arms; Bill reinterprets the coat of arms and shows Tim that his ancestors were in fact sheep stealers. None of the Goodies ancestors knew each other at this time.

Then, a bus went around the United Kingdom, taking up all of the young men of the villages — first of all Graeme's ancestor 'Keltic Kilty' was rounded up, with all of the other young men from his village — then Bill's ancestor 'Kinda Kinky' was rounded up, with all of the other young men from his village — and, finally, Tim's ancestor 'Kounty Kutie' was rounded up, with all the other young men in the same sheep 'trade'.

All of the young men who had been captured were then put up for auction as entertainers, and eventually everyone had been bought — apart from 'Kounty Kutie', 'Keltic Kilty' and 'Kinda Kinky', who were forced to work together as entertainers, including on "The Black and White Minstrel Show". They rebel against being Minstrels, leading to hijinks as they are chased around the BBC. The network is so impressed they give the trio their own series.

== Cultural references ==
- Roots
- The Black and White Minstrel Show
