= Beastly Record =

Studio album by The Goodies
- Released: 1978
- Genre: Comedy
- Label: EMI
- Producers: Miki Antony, Bill Oddie

The Goodies chronology
Nothing to Do with Us (1976)	Beastly Record (1978)

Beastly Record is the fourth and final studio album released by comedy trio The Goodies (Tim Brooke-Taylor, Graeme Garden and Bill Oddie) on the EMI records label in 1978. It featured the "gentleman musicians of Le Hot Club de Cricklewood, the Cricklewood Rhythm Boys & The Finchley Funketeers with the Hendon Horns, all under the direction of Dave MacRae".

== Track listing ==
All songs written by Bill Oddie. Timings are actual timings taken from an original LP.

Side 1

1. "Melody Farm" - 2:30
2. "Taking My Oyster for Walkies" - 3:23
3. "Spring Spring Spring" - 2:40
4. "Terrapins" - 2:31
5. "A Man's Best Friend is His Duck" - 2:32
6. "Spank That Hamster" - 2:52

Side 2

1. "Rastashanty" - 2:47
2. "Ironing My Goldfish" - 2:24
3. "Funky Farm" - 2:27
4. "There’s a Walrus in My Soup" 3:39
5. "Why Doesn’t an Elephant go Tweet Tweet" - 2:01
6. "I Am a Carnivore" - 3:16
7. "Elephant Joke Song" - 3:54

== Production ==
- Producer: Miki Antony and Bill Oddie
- Recorded at: CBS Studios (London)
- Recording engineer: Steve Levine
- 2nd engineer: Graham Dickson
- All rrangements by: Dave MacRae
