= Ripping Yarns =

British television series (1976–1979)

- Title card
- Created by: Michael Palin; Terry Jones
- Starring: Michael Palin
- Country of origin: United Kingdom
- No. of series: 2
- No. of episodes: 9

Production
- Running time: ~30 min
- Production company: BBC

Original release
- Network: BBC Two
- Release: 7 January 1976 – 24 October 1979

Ripping Yarns is a British television adventure comedy anthology series. It was written by Michael Palin and Terry Jones of Monty Python fame and transmitted on BBC Two. Following an initial pilot episode in January 1976, it ran for two series — five episodes in September and October 1977 and three episodes in October 1979. Each episode had a different setting and characters, looking at a different aspect of British culture and parodying pre-World War II literature aimed at schoolboys. In the title, "ripping" is a chiefly British slang colloquialism for "exciting" or "thrilling", with "yarn" used in the sense of a story.

== Pilot episode ==
In 1975, the BBC commissioned a pilot episode from Palin and Jones, which was envisaged to be a light entertainment comedy piece. The result was Tomkinson's Schooldays (a title loosely inspired by Tom Brown's Schooldays and suggested by BBC director Terry Hughes). Palin and Jones both wrote and starred in multiple roles. Once the series was picked up, Jones did not appear in any further episodes, following a decision by James Gilbert that it should be a “Michael Palin series”.

== Episodes ==
The nine episodes and their original airdates are:

=== First series ===
1. "Tomkinson's Schooldays" – pilot – 7 January 1976
2. "The Testing of Eric Olthwaite" – 27 September 1977
3. "Escape from Stalag Luft 112B" – 4 October 1977
4. "Murder at Moorstones Manor" – 11 October 1977
5. "Across the Andes by Frog" – 18 October 1977
6. "The Curse of the Claw" – 25 October 1977

=== Second series ===
1. "Whinfrey's Last Case" – 10 October 1979
2. "Golden Gordon" – 17 October 1979
3. "Roger of the Raj" – 24 October 1979

== Production details ==
Tomkinson's Schooldays was shot on videotape in front of a studio audience, with filmed exterior scenes. The remaining episodes were all shot on film, and were originally shown with laugh tracks (recorded by showing each completed film to an audience), but with a couple of exceptions these have been omitted from repeats.

In 2014, the series was repeated on BBC Four, commencing with Tomkinson's Schooldays on 3 April. This broadcast included a laugh track. The first episode was preceded by a documentary, Alexander Armstrong's Real Ripping Yarns, which examined the assumptions and outlook of the original boys' magazines of which Ripping Yarns were a parody. Both Palin and Jones contributed to the programme.

The theme tune for the series was Fanfare from the ‘Facade Suite No. 2', by Sir William Walton, played by the City of Birmingham Orchestra, conducted by Louis Frémaux.

=== Directors ===
Terry Hughes, who had directed The Two Ronnies and would later direct The Golden Girls and 3rd Rock from the Sun, directed early episodes of Ripping Yarns. Jim Franklin, known for The Goodies, directed other episodes and two episodes in the second series were directed by Alan J. W. Bell, known for The Hitchhiker's Guide to the Galaxy and Last of the Summer Wine. Bell used Michael Radford, who later became noted for the films Nineteen Eighty-Four, White Mischief and Il Postino, as cinematographer.

=== Cast ===
Each episode featured several guest character actors including Ian Ogilvy, Kenneth Colley, Isabel Dean, Liz Smith, Roy Kinnear, Frank Middlemass, Iain Cuthbertson, John Le Mesurier, Jan Francis, Denholm Elliott, Gwen Taylor, Harold Innocent, Richard Vernon, Gwen Watford, Barbara New, Gerald Sim, Gilly Flower, Joan Sanderson, Roger Sloman and David Griffin. John Cleese makes a cameo appearance in the episode "Golden Gordon".

== Reception ==
The series was nominated for a BAFTA award in 1978 for 'Best Film Cameraman' (Peter Hall) and won in 1980 for 'Best Light Entertainment Programme/Series'.

In a review for the Guardian, Phelim O'Neill praised the show for its superior production values, stating it was "charming, insightful and very, very silly."

== Books ==
The Complete Ripping Yarns by Michael Palin (right) and Terry Jones (1999)

The scripts were published in book form, with sepia-tinted stills, as Ripping Yarns (1978; ISBN 0-413-46250-1) and More Ripping Yarns (1980; ISBN 0-413-47530-1) and later collected in an omnibus volume, The Complete Ripping Yarns (1999; ISBN 0-413-77360-4).

Across the Andes by Frog originally appeared in Bert Fegg's Nasty Book for Boys and Girls, co-authored by Palin and Jones.

== Home media ==
The series was released on three VHS tapes in the UK in the 1990s. Two of these compilations were reissued by Revelation Films on Region 0 (worldwide) DVD in 2000, though the six episodes included were not remastered.

The fully restored series was released in October 2004 as The Complete Ripping Yarns. This two-disc Region 2 DVD set included commentaries on all nine episodes by Palin and Jones and a deleted scene (without soundtrack) from Murder at Moorstones Manor. All of the episodes, except Tomkinson's Schooldays and Murder at Moorstones Manor, have optional laugh-free soundtracks.

The DVD set also includes the only surviving (and rather poor quality) recording of Palin and Jones's comic BBC play Secrets from 1973, as well as a documentary by Michael Palin entitled Comic Roots in which he goes back to visit his home town. Not linked in the menu are scans of the first drafts of the scripts for six episodes (Tomkinson's Schooldays, The Testing of Eric Olthwaite, Murder at Moorstone Manor, Across the Andes by Frog, The Curse of the Claw and Whinfrey's Last Case), type-written with Palin's handwritten comments and changes in the margin. There is an informative booklet enclosed. This set was also released in Region 1 with all of the above included, apart from Secrets. A further box set, fully remastered, including the directors commentary, was released in 2004.

The DVD was re-released in March 2012. To publicise the event, Network hosted a "Hopathon" to recreate the "Tomkinson's School Days" episode. The intention was to break a Guinness World Record, but not enough people took part.
