= A Collection of Goodies (Special Tax Edition) =

- The Goodies episode
- Episode no.: Episode special
- Directed by: Jim Franklin
- Original air date: 24 September 1972

Episode chronology
← Previous "The Baddies"	Next → "The New Office"

"A Collection of Goodies (Special Tax Edition)" is an episode of the British comedy television series The Goodies. The episode was written by The Goodies, with songs and music by Bill Oddie.

== Plot ==
The Goodies attempt to save money by inventing claims on a Tax Evasion Form. The episode then sees Graeme's computer recalling the claims from the form. Once the claim has gone through, the Goodies perform to make money, but make nothing and then discover that they have been in the queue to the local unemployment office.

== Notes ==
The special used new linking material to accompany a compilation of footage from five of The Goodies segments from Engelbert with The Young Generation from early 1972.

== DVD and VHS releases ==
Extracts of the episode including the gymnasium sketch surfaced DVD special features by the BBC. To date, this is the only episode to have never aired on free-to-air TV in Australia, and remains reasonably rare. The episode was released on DVD for the first time in full along with all the other Goodies episodes in 2018.
