= War Babies (The Goodies) =

- The Goodies episode
- Episode no.: Series 8 Episode 6
- Original air date: 18 February 1980

Guest appearances
- Geoffrey Palmer as the School Headmaster; Andrew Ray; Sharon Miller; Ernie Goodyear

Episode chronology
← Previous "Animals"	Next → "Snow White 2"

"War Babies" is an episode of the British comedy television series The Goodies.

It was the last episode to be produced and transmitted by BBC Television.

This episode is also known as "World War 2".

Written by Graeme Garden and Bill Oddie with songs and music by Bill Oddie.

== Plot ==
It is the Second World War, and Tim, Bill and Graeme are only two years old. However, they are much bigger in size than the usual two-year-old children — even bigger than the four-year-old, six-year-old, and eight-year-old children who are attending the same school for gifted children as they are.

Graeme and Bill are dressed in school uniforms and are both very intelligent two-year-old children. Tim, however, arrives at the school in a pram wearing a bib and bonnet, so it would appear that his inclusion in a school for gifted children is a mistake — or too soon. There is some implication that Tim's rich parents have paid vast sums of money so that he can attend the school, despite his average intelligence of a baby.

When a live bomb crashes into the room that Tim, Bill and Graeme are in, they are given the task to disarm it. Graeme and Bill set about disarming the bomb, but find the going difficult when Tim tries to put square objects into round holes and round objects into square holes, and tries banging the objects in, in his frustration to do so. However, Bill and Graeme are successful in what they are doing and the bomb is disarmed.

Then they are given their next assignment — they are to enter Germany and bring a cigar back for Winston Churchill. It is thought that, as children, they might find it easier to enter and leave Germany than an adult would. Tim, Bill and Graeme parachute into Germany, and Graeme and Bill successfully land. However, Bill misses catching Tim, who is all broken up as a result. Graeme puts all of Tim's 'spare parts' into a pram, and then asks Bill for Tim's head (which is still in its bonnet) — however, Bill accidentally brings back a cabbage, much to Graeme's disgust. After further searching, Tim's head is found and Graeme then 'operates' on him — giving Tim a clock for a heart, and a toy voicebox and a wind-up key to make Tim move, thereby turning Tim into the "Six Million Dollar Baby".

Back in England following their successful trip to Germany, the two-year-old Goodies are asked to impersonate Winston Churchill in public (as the "real" Churchill looks like Adolf Hitler). Tim is given the job of acting the part, but the Goodies run into unexpected problems.

== Cultural references ==
- World War II
- Winston Churchill
- Adolf Hitler
- The Six Million Dollar Man
- Dad's Army
