= Astronauts (TV series) =

1981 British television series

- Genre: Sitcom
- Written by: Graeme Garden; Bill Oddie
- Starring: Christopher Godwin; Carmen du Sautoy; Barrie Rutter; Bruce Boa
- Country of origin: United Kingdom
- Original language: English
- No. of series: 2
- No. of episodes: 13

Production
- Running time: 30 minutes
- Production companies: ATV (1981); Central Independent Television (1983)

Original release
- Network: ITV
- Release: 26 October 1981 – 23 August 1983

Astronauts is a British television sitcom that aired on ITV from 26 October 1981 to 23 August 1983. It was written by Graeme Garden and Bill Oddie, two of The Goodies. Dick Clement and Ian La Frenais, who wrote Porridge, were script editors. It was produced by WitzEnd for ATV, which became Central midway through the production run. Channel 4 repeated a selection of eight of the episodes in 1986.

== Plot ==
The three primary characters are sent into outer space to occupy a space station for six months. They take with them a dog, a collection of white mice and some insects. The dog, Bimbo, had previously appeared in The Goodies. The astronauts' names are Malcolm Mattocks, Gentian Foster and David Ackroyd, whilst the astronauts' contact at Mission Control is Beadle, an American. The humour was primarily based on the claustrophobic conditions of the two-room "sky lab" and the consequent tensions.

== Cast ==
- Christopher Godwin as Commander Malcolm Mattocks
- Carmen du Sautoy as Dr. Gentian Foster
- Barrie Rutter as Technical Officer David Ackroyd
- Bruce Boa as Beadle

== Episodes ==
=== Series 1 (1981) ===
1. Episode One (26 October 1981) – It's the dawning of a new era. US Air Force Colonel Lloyd Beadle unveils his British space travellers for the press, whose imaginations go into overdrive when they learn that one of the crew is a woman. But Beadle has another ace up his sleeve: Bimbo, a mongrel dog.
2. Episode Two (2 November 1981) – In their orbiting space station, the crew members are trying to acclimatise themselves while rapidly discovering each other's foibles. Sleep eludes them, and they realise that privacy is a thing of the past...
3. Episode Three (9 November 1981) – Gentian's in charge of the Life Science Projects, and David's doing Earth Observation, Astronomy, Crystallography and Communications — leaving Malcolm doing the dusting. And not terribly well. It takes a major crisis before the Mission Commander finally comes into his own.
4. Episode Four (16 November 1981) – Earthly problems invade the space station and Gentian Foster believes she knows why: Ackroyd's being beastly because he doesn't fancy her, and Mattocks is being patronising because he does.
5. Episode Five (23 November 1981) – After five weeks of constant surveillance, relations between the crew and Ground Control are strained. So when Beadle disappears for lunch, the astronauts decide to get even.
6. Episode Six (30 November 1981) – Fifty days in space should be newsworthy, but the media has already lost interest. Beadle promises to remedy the situation. Ackroyd, however, is more interested in the potent product of his lab experiment involving yeast, fruit flies and a copious quantity of blackcurrant juice...
7. Episode Seven (7 December 1981) – Nine weeks into the mission: depression is rampant. The food is boring. The routine is boring. Then, catastrophe! A wiring fault plunges the station into darkness. With Mattocks and Ackroyd out of action, Foster must rely on Bimbo to save her.

=== Series 2 (1983) ===
1. "One in Four Goes" (19 July 1983) – Gentian finds herself talking to the machinery while Ackroyd quite happily holds conversations with himself. Mattocks is concerned about both of them and discusses it with the only person he can trust — Bimbo.
2. "Why Are We Here?" (26 July 1983) – Ackroyd denounces the whole mission as a big publicity stunt. Mattocks, meanwhile, has been caught out acting furtively and sending scrambled messages. Gentian and Ackroyd want to know what's happening but it's top secret...
3. "Absence Makes the Heart" (2 August 1983) – Mattocks is pining for his wife but he gets no sympathy from the other two, who are determined to see that he lives up to his domestic responsibilities while he's at the space station. Beadle has a hot date.
4. "We Are Not Alone" (9 August 1983) – Ackroyd is concerned that he is now maintaining some of the systems beyond their level of tolerance — emergency repairs are now the norm. During one of the blackouts Gentian sees a bright object outside her lab window.
5. "One Week to Go" (16 August 1983) – One week to go and the crew breaks the record for the longest spaceflight in history. Beadle is ecstatic but Mattocks is behaving more strangely than normal, questioning things at a cosmic level — much to the annoyance of the other two.
6. "Going Home" (23 August 1983) – After six months, the mission is completed and it's time to go home. Mattocks' recent epiphany still annoys the other two, and concern over re-entry has caused group insomnia. Ackroyd doesn't want to go home.

== DVD release ==
The complete series of Astronauts was released on 9 July 2012.

== American version ==
On 11 August 1982, CBS aired a pilot for an American adaptation called The Astronauts, but no series developed. It starred Granville Van Dusen as Mattocks (renamed Roger Canfield), Brianne Leary as Foster (renamed Jennifer Tate), Bruce Davison as Ackroyd and McLean Stevenson as Beadle (renamed Michael C. Booker).
