= Dave MacRae =

New Zealand keyboardist (born 1940)

- Born: David Scott MacRae; 2 April 1940 (age 86); Auckland, New Zealand
- Genres: Jazz, jazz-rock
- Years active: 1960s–present
- Website: joyyates-davemacrae.com

David Scott MacRae (born 2 April 1940, Auckland, New Zealand) is a New Zealand keyboardist, noted for his contributions in jazz and jazz rock, and his collaborations with musicians from the Canterbury scene.

== Life and career ==
MacRae studied at the New South Wales Conservatorium of Music and then worked in Australia in the 1960s as an arranger for Festival Records. He moved to the United States in 1969, playing with experimental groups in Los Angeles before joining Buddy Rich's ensemble in 1970. He relocated to London in 1971, working that year with jazz musicians Clark Terry, Chet Baker, Jon Hendricks and Gil Evans.

From 1972 to 1980 he was the musical director for The Goodies, arranging and producing the music for seasons 3 to 8 of the television series of the same name, and arranging and performing on their five studio albums. MacRae's wife Joy Yates was a backing vocalist on several of the songs, with both appearing on camera in The Goodies – Almost Live. He worked closely with Bill Oddie on the music and together they wrote their most successful song, "The Funky Gibbon", which peaked at number 4 on the UK Singles Chart in 1975.

In 1971, he was briefly with a group called Caparius before he joined Matching Mole, where he remained until 1972. In March 1973, he recorded for the Labyrinth album with Ian Carr's group Nucleus. Concurrently he played in Elton Dean's band, Just Us. He played in WMWM and Giles Farnaby's Dream Band in 1973 and did session work for Back Door in 1974, but left Nucleus around this time to concentrate on his own project called Pacific Eardrum, which he led with his wife Joy Yates until 1979. He continued working with Canterbury musicians such as Robert Wyatt, Mike Gibbs, and Richard Sinclair through the 1970s.

In the 1980s, MacRae worked briefly with False Alarm, a band led by Allan Holdsworth, which eventually became I.O.U. with the addition of vocalist Paul Williams; and then played in a reconstituted version of Soft Machine in 1984. During the 15 years he spent in the U.K., MacRae also worked with Ronnie Scott, Clifford Jordan, Annie Ross, Cliff Richard, and Scott Walker, and as musical director to The Goodies television show from series six/1976.

He returned to Australia later in 1984, and played in the Sydney area with Bernie McGann and Ronnie Scott.

He is the father of singer Jade MacRae.

== Other sources ==
- Roger T. Dean, "Dave MacRae". Grove Jazz online.
