= The Long Hot Satsuma =

British radio comedy programme

- Genre: Radio comedy
- Country of origin: United Kingdom
- Language: English
- Home station: BBC Radio
- Starring: Graeme Garden; Barry Cryer; Alison Steadman; Paul B. Davies; Julia Hills
- Produced by: Dirk Maggs
- Original release: 25 May – 13 July 1989
- No. of episodes: 8

The Long Hot Satsuma is a radio comedy sketch show from 1989 featuring Graeme Garden, Barry Cryer, Alison Steadman, Paul B. Davies and Julia Hills. The show was produced by Dirk Maggs.

Some episodes were repeated on BBC Radio 7 now BBC Radio 4 Extra in 2008, 2010, 2011, and 2012.

== Episode list ==
- Episode 1 - First broadcast on 25 May 1989
- Episode 2 - First broadcast on 1 June 1989
- Episode 3 - First broadcast on 8 June 1989
- Episode 4 - First broadcast on 15 June 1989
- Episode 5 - First broadcast on 22 June 1989
- Episode 6 - First broadcast on 29 June 1989
- Episode 7 - First broadcast on 6 July 1989
- Episode 8 - First broadcast on 13 July 1989
