= New London Chorale =

The New London Chorale was a British choir founded in 1979, released recordings under the direction of Tom Parker. The Chorale collaborated with solo singers, including Vicki Brown, Madeline Bell, Gordon Neville Janet Mooney and Katie Kissoon.

== Discography ==
=== Albums ===
- The Young Messiah (1979) - Vicki Brown, Madeline Bell, Steve Jerome, George
- The Young Matthew Passion (1986) - Vicki Brown, Madeline Bell, Gordon Neville, Steve Jerome
- The Young Wolfgang Amadeus Mozart (1986) - Vicki Brown, Madeline Bell, Gordon Neville
- The Young Christmas (1987) - Wild Gaynor, Gordon Neville
- The Young Verdi (1988) - Vicki Brown, Madeline Bell, Gordon Neville
- The Christmas Album (1989) - Vicki Brown, Gordon Neville, Shezwea Powell
- The Young Beethoven (1990) - Vicki Brown, Juliet Roberts, Gordon Neville
- The Young Puccini (1991) - Gordon Neville, Amy Vanmeenen, Marilyn David, Tony Jackson
- The Young Schubert (1991) - Marilyn David, Amy Vanmeenen, Lance Ellington, Gordon Neville
- The Young Tchaikovsky (1993) - Marilyn David, Amy Vanmeenen, Lance Ellington, Gordon Neville
- Christmas with the New London Chorale (1994) - Marilyn David, Amy Vanmeenen, Lance Ellington, Gordon Neville
- The Young Handel (1995) - Marilyn David, Amy Vanmeenen, Lance Ellington, Gordon Neville
- Young Forever (1996)
- Sing in with the New London Chorale (1996) - Marilyn David, Amy Vanmeenen, Lance Ellington, Gordon Neville
- The New Amadeus Mozart (1997) - Amy Vanmeenen, Janet Mooney, Lance Ellington, Gordon Neville
- It's for you (1999) - Amy Vanmeenen, Janet Mooney, Lance Ellington, Gordon Neville
- The Young Mendelssohn (2004) - Amy Vanmeenen, Jackie Rawe, Lance Ellington, Gordon Neville
- Viva Verdi (2012) - Janet Mooney, Lance Ellington, Gordon Neville

== Tom Parker, Other projects ==
- Joy - Apollo 100 (1972)
- Plaid Pops Orchestra (1976), with Tommy Scott
- European Sound Project (1990)
- The Ten Commandments (1990) Amy Vanmeenen, Anita Meyer, Rob de Nijs, Edward Reekers
- Christmas - Berdien Stenberg (1986)
- Pirouette - Berdien Stenberg (1987)
- The Brand Burgers - Berdien Stenberg and Jaap van Zweden (1995)
