= Joy (Apollo 100 song) =

1972 instrumental Pop hit record by Apollo 100

Single by Apollo 100

from the album Joy
- B-side: "Exercise in A Minor"
- Released: December 1971
- Recorded: 1971
- Genre: Progressive pop, baroque pop
- Length: 2:48
- Label: Mega
- Songwriter: Bach

Apollo 100 singles chronology
"Joy" (1971)	"Mendelssohn's 4th (Second Movement)" (1972)

"Joy" is a 1971 instrumental pop hit record by Apollo 100. It is a contemporary rendition of a 1723 composition by Johann Sebastian Bach entitled "Jesu, Joy of Man's Desiring", shortened to simply "Joy".

It reached number 6 on the U.S. Billboard Hot 100 in January 1972 and number 2 on the Adult Contemporary chart. In Canada, "Joy" reached number 24. It is ranked as the 71st biggest U.S. hit of 1972.

== Chart history ==
=== Weekly charts ===
Chart (1971–1972)	Peak position
Australia (Kent Music Report)	3
Canada RPM Top Singles	24
New Zealand (Listener)	20
South Africa (Springbok)	18
U.S. Billboard Hot 100	6
U.S. Billboard Easy Listening	2
U.S. Cash Box Top 100	6

=== Year-end charts ===
Chart (1972)	Rank
Australia	33
U.S. Billboard Hot 100	71

== Other versions ==
The Ventures released a version of "Joy" in 1972. It reached number 109 on the U.S. Billboard pop chart.
