= Kris Ife =

Kris John Ife
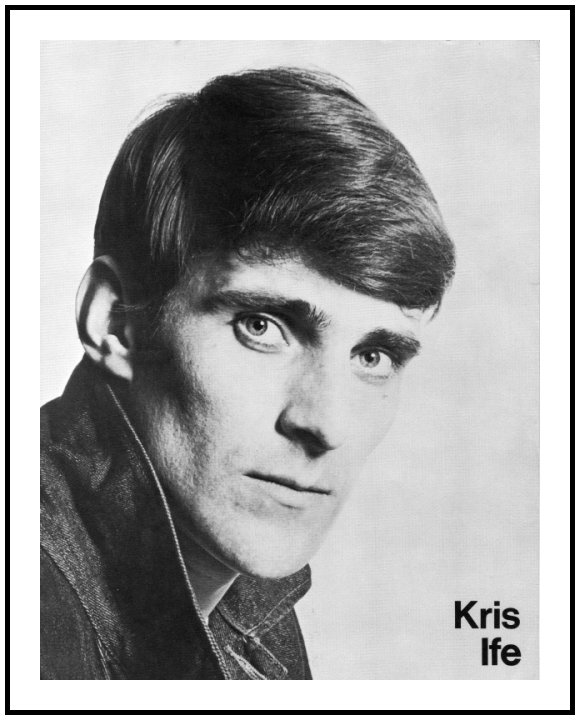

Background information
- Also known as: Judd
- Born: 16 June 1946
- Origin: Aylesbury, Buckinghamshire, England
- Died: 8 November 2013 (aged 67)
- Genres: Pop
- Instrument(s): Vocals, guitar
- Years active: 1964–2013
- Website: Official website Kris Ife on Myspace

Kris John Ife (16 June 1946 – 8 November 2013) was an English singer and songwriter, who enjoyed modest success in Britain in the 1960s and 1970s. He recorded a version of "Hush", later covered by Deep Purple.

== Career ==
Born in Aylesbury, Buckinghamshire, England, Ife's father was based at RAF Halton near Wendover. Ife moved to London and attended St Clement Danes School in Acton, and it was whilst at school that he formed a skiffle group called the Gravediggers.

After leaving school he started a group called the Vikings with John Howell and Ray Hailey. The Vikings recorded "Space Walk", produced by Curly Clayton which was not released under their name, but turned up some years later under the name of "Gemini" and with a different producer listed, although the recording was the same.

In 1964, the Vikings manager, John Smith, amalgamated them with The Quiet Five, taking their lead vocalist Patrick Dane and bassist Richard Barnes, along with the name. Dane left some time later, before the Quiet Five had recorded anything. Despite their name there were six members, John Howell (organ/vocals), Kris Ife (guitar/vocals), Richard Barnes (bass guitar/vocals), Roger McKew (lead guitar), Ray Hailey (drums) and John "Satch" Goswell (saxophone). During their time together the Quiet Five released a handful of singles and managed to get into the Top 50 of the UK Singles Chart in 1965 with a song written by Ife, "When the Morning Sun Dries the Dew", and again in 1966 with a cover of the Simon & Garfunkel song "Homeward Bound".

The Quiet Five played at Windsor Castle at a party for Prince Charles' 18th birthday in December 1966, and subsequently they played on the 'Society Circuit', including the Royal Hunt Ball and the Venice Film Festival.

Kris Ife – 1965 Gene Pitney tour

Ife left The Quiet Five in 1967 for a solo career, and it was at this time that he recorded a cover of Joe South's "Hush". The version inspired Deep Purple's 1968 hit cover of the same song.

Ife was asked to sing a track "Imagination" for the British record producer Mark Wirtz, and wrote songs with J. Vincent Edwards and Miki Antony. Ife formed a session band which developed into the Matchmakers, to record material for Wirtz. Wirtz also recorded and produced the Judd album, Snarling Mumma Lion, which was co-written by Ife. Ife also recorded with J. Vincent Edwards under the name Jackson & Jones.

Most of Ife's recordings were released as Hush – Definitive Collection 1967–1973, on RPM Records. The Quiet Five recordings are on the CD, When the Morning Sun Dries the Dew, also on RPM Records.

In October 2008, he went to Philadelphia, United States, and recorded a CD of skiffle songs with J. Vincent Edwards and Wayne S. Newton, under the name of The Beaver Street Hat Band. The resultant album, 'Beaver Street', was available through a website.

Ife traced the family-tree back to the 16th century, discovering that Ife was an old Suffolk word for a yew tree.

Ife died of a heart attack in November 2013, at the age of 67.
