= The Inbetweenies =

Single by The Goodies
- A-side: "The Inbetweenies"
- B-side: "The Goodies"
- Released: 18 October 1974
- Genre: Pop, novelty
- Length: 3:16
- Label: Bradley's Records
- Songwriter(s): Bill Oddie
- Producer(s): Miki Antony

The Goodies singles chronology
"Goodies Theme"	"The Inbetweenies"	"Father Christmas Do Not Touch Me"

"The Inbetweenies" is a song by Bill Oddie and recorded by The Goodies. It was released as a single in October 1974 with "Father Christmas Do Not Touch Me" on the B-side.

It entered the UK Singles Chart on 7 December 1974 at #41. It remained in the chart for 9 weeks, peaking at #7.

In November 1974, the sides were reversed for the Christmas season with "Father Christmas Do Not Touch Me" released as a single with "The Inbetweenies" on the B-side. This technically made it a double A-side.

The song peaked at number 87 in Australia in 1975.
