= Miki Antony =

British musical artist (born 1947)

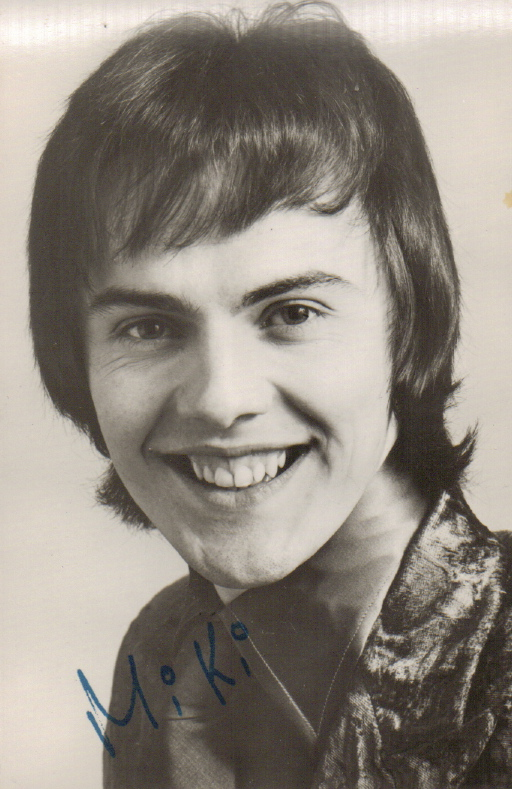
- 1971 autographed publicity photograph

Background information
- Born: Michael Antony Derrick; 24 January 1947 (age 79); Newmarket, Suffolk, England
- Occupations: Performer, composer, producer
- Instrument: Piano
- Years active: 1969–1985
- Labels: Bell, RCA
- Website: www.mikiantony.biz

Miki Antony (born Michael Antony Derrick, 24 January 1947) is a British singer, composer, record producer and property developer.

== Life and career ==
Derrick, J. Vincent Edwards and Kris Ife began writing songs under the collective pseudonym Miki Antony, including "I Remember Natalie" recorded in 1968 by Bob Monkhouse (and arranged and co-produced by Mark Wirtz). Derrick then changed his name by deed poll to Miki Antony, and began writing and performing in his own right.

His career in the music industry lasted approximately from 1969 to 1985. During that time he had several hit records, as a singer, writer, and record producer, both in United Kingdom and abroad. As a singer he had a UK top 30 hit with "If It Wasn't for the Reason that I Love You" (1973), and a follow-up with "Another Without You Day"; both were Greenaway/Cook songs and record productions. He wrote, produced, and sang several other minor hits both here and abroad including "Jack-a-Dandy" which was a number one in South Africa and Australia. His only LP was City of the Angels recorded in Los Angeles for EMI in 1978, which is a collection of all his best songs, many of which were covered by other artists. He also won the 1981 Castlebar Song Contest and came second both in the South American (Chile) and the Greek (XV1Olympiad).

As a writer, his songs have been recorded by MWD, The 5th Dimension, Vince Hill, Pat McGlynn, The Nolans, The Congregation - (million seller in US), Bob Monkhouse, The Goodies, Russ Abbot, Demis Roussos, Hot Gossip and Mary Mason. His disco library music was featured in all The Benny Hill Show, The Avengersand the Sweeney TV series. He composed with Dave Jordan the theme songs for two television series; Here Comes Mumfie and a Bunch of Fives starring Lesley Manville. Antony wrote the Dentyne chewing gum jingle that was featured in UK cinemas for 10 years. To date over 400 different songs of his have been recorded.

Antony's hit records were mainly record productions and included seven with the Goodies - including "Funky Gibbon" and "The Inbetweenies". Two platinum selling LPs in Japan with Pat McGlynn (Bay City Rollers) both went to number one - 16 songs were written by Antony.

His other credits include "Angel of the Morning" for Mary Mason (UK top 30 hit) and one other top 50 "Love Crusader" by Hot Gossip, which featured Sarah Brightman as lead singer. "I Remember Natalie" was top 20 in Germany for Vince Hill.

After leaving the music industry, he had a successful career as a property developer converting NHS hospitals into apartments and houses until he retired in 2001 to work from home in Windsor, and spend more time with his family. He continues to write songs and in 2010 "If You Never Have the Chance" got to the final of the UK Songwriting Contest.

== Discography ==
- Atlantic Shuffle feat. Barry Blue
- Bo Berry feat. Dave Rowberry
- Bop at the Hop feat. Dave Rowberry
- Bouncing feat. Barry Blue
- Buckingham Palace
- C'mon Eddie feat. Barry Blue / Dave Rowberry
- Coco de mer feat. Tom Parker
- Costa del Soul feat. Barry Blue
- Dance, Dance, Dance feat. Barry Blue
- Dawn Motown feat. Barry Blue
- Dirty Rat feat. Tom Parker
- Disco Partners
- Disco Stepping
- Dominique's Blues feat. Tom Parker
- Domino feat. Barry Blue / Dave Rowberry
- Electric Blitz feat. Tom Parker
- French Rock feat. Tom Parker
- Funky Feeling
- Funky Moog feat. Barry Blue
- Get It While It's Going feat. Tom Parker
- Guitar Freeway feat. Tom Parker
- Guitar Twang feat. Barry Blue / Dave Rowberry
- Itchy Funk
- Jazz Man's Jig feat. Tom Parker
- Let's Rock Tonight feat. Barry Blue / Dave Rowberry
- Little Lucy feat. Barry Blue / Dave Rowberry
- Miki's Swing feat. Barry Blue / Dave Rowberry
- Moving Traffic feat. Tom Parker
- Musical Seasons feat. Tom Parker
- The Mysteries of Mars feat. Tom Parker
- Northern Soul
- Oh Twister feat. Dave Rowberry
- Peggy Blue feat. Barry Blue / Dave Rowberry
- Portugalia feat. Tom Parker
- Rock and Shout feat. Dave Rowberry
- Sail With the Sound feat. Tom Parker
- Silverstone feat. Tom Parker
- Soul Stomp feat. Barry Blue
- Tension in the City feat. Tom Parker
- Two Light Years Away feat. Tom Parker
- Unlimited Love feat. Barry Blue
- We Made It Last Summertime
