= Broaden Your Mind =

British TV comedy series (1968–1969)

- Created by: Tim Brooke-Taylor; Graeme Garden
- Starring: Tim Brooke-Taylor; Graeme Garden; Bill Oddie
- Country of origin: United Kingdom
- No. of episodes: 13

Production
- Producer: Sydney Lotterby
- Running time: 30 minutes

Original release
- Network: BBC2
- Release: 28 October 1968 – 29 December 1969

Broaden Your Mind is a British television comedy series, broadcast on BBC2 and starring Tim Brooke-Taylor and Graeme Garden, joined by Bill Oddie for the second series. Guest cast members included Michael Palin, Terry Jones, Jo Kendall, Roland MacLeod and Nicholas McArdle. It was one of BBC2's earliest programmes to be completely broadcast in colour, which had been introduced by the channel a year earlier.

Directed by Jim Franklin, the series was a precursor to the television comedy series The Goodies (of which early titles under consideration included "Narrow Your Mind").

Writers for the series included Tim Brooke-Taylor, Graeme Garden, Bill Oddie, Michael Palin, Terry Jones, John Cleese, Graham Chapman, Eric Idle, Terry Gilliam, Roland MacLeod, Marty Feldman, Barry Cryer, Barry Took, Jim Franklin, Simon Brett and Chris Stuart-Clark.

Broaden Your Mind was subtitled 'an encyclopaedia of the air' and consisted largely of short sketches. All of the programmes were wiped by the BBC after their first broadcast in 1968, and only a handful of brief filmed sequences survive, including the Peelers sketch, Turgonitis, "Ordinary Royal Family", Coughs and Sneezes, The Longbow and Wasps in Winter. All these sketches except Wasps in Winter were from the fifth episode of the second series, and were included, digitally restored, on Network DVD's 2003 release The Goodies at Last. The Wasps in Winter sketch was from the fourth episode of the first series. All of the programmes, however, survive as off-air audio recordings made by a fan at the time of original transmission.

== Main cast ==
- Tim Brooke-Taylor – Various Characters
- Graeme Garden – Various Characters
- Jo Kendall – Various Characters
- Nicholas McArdle – Various Characters
- Bill Oddie – Various Characters
- Roland MacLeod – Various Characters
- Sue Williams – Various Characters
- Gillian Parsons – Various Characters
- Jan Gummer – Various Characters
- Terry Jones – Various Characters
- Michael Palin – Various Characters
- Colin Bean – Various Characters
