= Jim Franklin (director) =

British television director and producer

- Born: c.1935
- Occupations: Television director, producer
- Years active: 1960s–1980s
- Known for: The Goodies'', Broaden Your Mind and Ripping Yarns

Jim Franklin (born c.1935) is a British television director and producer.

He has directed many British television comedy programmes, including The Goodies, Broaden Your Mind and Ripping Yarns.

== Filmography ==
Year	Title	Role	Notes
1966	The Frost Report	Director	Satirical sketch show with David Frost
1969	Broaden Your Mind	Director	Early comedy with Tim Brooke-Taylor and Graeme Garden
1970–1980	The Goodies	Director / Producer	Cult comedy series with surreal humor
1976–1979	Ripping Yarns	Director	Parody series by Michael Palin and Terry Jones
