= Twice a Fortnight =

- Starring: Graeme Garden; Terry Jones; Jonathan Lynn; Bill Oddie; Michael Palin; Tony Buffery
- Country of origin: United Kingdom
- Original language: English
- No. of episodes: 10

Production
- Executive producer: Tony Palmer
- Running time: 30 minutes

Original release
- Network: BBC1
- Release: 21 October – 23 December 1967

Twice a Fortnight is a 1967 British sketch comedy television series with Terry Jones, Michael Palin, Graeme Garden, Bill Oddie, Jonathan Lynn and Tony Buffery.

Graeme Garden suggested to the director, Tony Palmer, that Michael Palin and Terry Jones be included in the cast and writers of the show. All episodes are now lost as a result of the BBC wiping the tapes.

== Legacy ==
Graeme Garden appears briefly as Max Von Sydow in the trailer for Monty Python and the Holy Grail, in reused footage from Twice a Fortnight.
