= The Funky Gibbon =

Single by The Goodies

from the album The New Goodies LP
- A-side: "The Funky Gibbon"
- B-side: "Sick-Man Blues"
- Released: February 1975
- Genre: Pop, novelty
- Length: 3:25
- Label: Bradley's Records
- Songwriter: Bill Oddie
- Producer: Miki Antony

The Goodies singles chronology
"The Goodies Theme" (1975)	"The Funky Gibbon" (1975)	"Black Pudding Bertha" (1975)

"The Funky Gibbon" is a novelty song by Bill Oddie and recorded by The Goodies. It was arranged by Tom Parker ("with interference from Bill Oddie") with the musical backing provided by members of the R&B band Gonzalez and released as a single in February 1975. The B-side was "Sick-Man Blues", which had been written by Oddie for use in the radio series I'm Sorry, I'll Read That Again.

It was the most successful single for The Goodies. It entered the UK Singles Chart on 15 March 1975 at no. 37, remaining in the chart for 10 weeks and peaking at no. 4. It also received considerable airplay in the United States on The Dr. Demento radio show and reached no. 79 on the Billboard Hot 100 in late 1975.

The Funky Gibbon was released with multiple alternative codas at the end of the song including "Tie a Yellow Gibbon Round the Ole Oak Tree" plus "And for Me Some Scarlet Gibbons, Scarlet Gibbons for My Hair" which were randomly heard on the double grooved single; as well as "He Promised to Buy Me a Bunch of Blue Gibbons to Tie Up My Bonny Brown ...".

The Goodies performed the song live numerous times, including on Top of the Pops on 20 March 1975 and in The Goodies – Almost Live in 1976.

The b-side, "Sick-Man Blues", parodied the recent hit "Up in a Puff of Smoke" by former Pickettywitch singer Polly Brown.

"The Funky Gibbon" was re-released in November 2010 to raise funds for the International Primate Protection League's "Save the Gibbon" appeal.

== Charts ==
Chart (1975)	Peak position
UK (Official Charts Company)	4
