= Bradley's Records =

UK record label

- Parent company: ATV Music
- Founded: 1973; 52 years ago
- Defunct: 1977; 48 years ago
- Genre: Pop, rock, novelty
- Country of origin: United Kingdom

Bradley's Records was a UK record label in the mid-1970s. It was founded by ATV Music publishers in 1973 and run by Derek Johns. The label was active for four years with moderate success, but was discontinued in early 1977.

Three acts were chosen to launch the label in February 1973: Prog-rock band Kala (an offshoot of Quintessence), Paul Brett and Hunter Muskett.

Lack of commercial success caused a re-think and in late 1973 all three original acts departed (Kala were dropped after they refused to change their musical direction and wear glitter and make-up). Stuart Slater, who by now had replaced Johns, began to concentrate on releasing singles by pop artists; a policy that was to provide a number of chart hits.

Among its roster of artists were television comedy trio The Goodies and Stephanie de Sykes (Slater's partner) who both had top 20 hits in the UK. Other hits released by the label included Sweet Dreams' "Honey, Honey" - a top 10 hit in 1974.

Other acts signed by Bradley's Records included:

- Tarney-Spencer Band
- Claude Francois
