= Apollo 100 =

British musical group

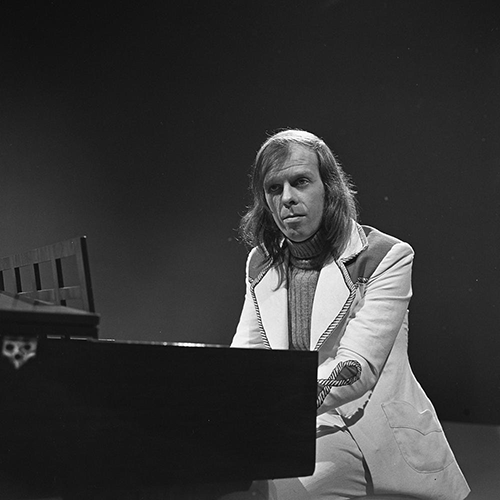
- Bandleader Tom Parker in 1972 on AVRO's TopPop.

Background information
- Genres: Instrumental rock, progressive pop, baroque pop
- Years active: 1971–1973
- Past members: Tom Parker; Clem Cattini; Vic Flick; Zed Jenkins; Jim Lawless; Brian Odgers

Apollo 100 were a British instrumental group that had a U.S. Billboard Hot 100 top 10 hit with the Bach–inspired single "Joy" in 1972.

== History ==
Apollo 100 was founded by arranger and multi-instrumentalist Tom Parker, who was known for his arrangements from the Young Blood catalogue, such as the Top 20 American hit "Chirpy Chirpy Cheep Cheep" and a number of Don Fardon's recordings. Parker had played keyboards, clarinet, saxophone, trumpet, trombone and a number of other instruments from an early age, and entered the music industry as a session musician by the 1960s. In the intervening time, he associated with a number of groups, including The Mark Leeman 5, Jimmy James and the Vagabonds and Eric Burdon with the New Animals.

Parker formed Apollo 100 in the latter part of 1971 with fellow session musicians drummer Clem Cattini, guitarist Vic Flick, guitarist Zed Jenkins, percussionist Jim Lawless, and bassist Brian Odgers. In December 1971, they released their first single, "Joy", an electrified arrangement by Clive Scott of Bach's "Jesu, Joy of Man's Desiring". The single rose to number 6 on the Billboard Hot 100 in the U.S. None of their subsequent efforts was as successful, and they broke up in 1973.

Parker went on to form the New London Chorale.

== Soundtrack appearances ==
"Joy" has been featured on the soundtracks of the films Boogie Nights, One Day in September and The 40-Year-Old Virgin, as well as the television series The Man Who Fell to Earth. While not featured on the Battle of the Sexes soundtrack, the song is heard during a scene in the film and is cited in the end credits.

== Charting discography ==
=== Studio albums ===
List of albums, with selected chart positions
Title	Album details	Peak chart positions	
Title	Album details	AUS	US
Joy	Released: March 1972; Label: Mega M31-1010	-	47
Master Pieces	Released: April 1973; Label: Mega M51-5005	62	-

=== Compilation albums ===
List of albums, with selected chart positions
Title	Album details	Peak chart positions
Title	Album details	AUS
Reach for the Sky	Released: 1979; Label: Endeavour Records (END-002)	37

=== Singles ===
List of singles, with selected chart positions
Year	Title	Peak chart positions			
Year	Title	AUS	CAN	RSA	US 100
1971	"Joy"	3	24	18	6
1972	"Mendelssohn's 4th (Second Movement)"	-	-	-	94
