= The Goodies (TV series) =

British TV comedy series (1970–1982)

- Created by: Tim Brooke-Taylor; Graeme Garden; Bill Oddie
- Starring: Tim Brooke-Taylor; Graeme Garden; Bill Oddie
- Country of origin: United Kingdom
- Original language: English
- No. of series: 9
- No. of episodes: 76 (list of episodes)

Production
- Running time: 30–50 minutes
- Production companies: BBC; LWT (series 9)

Original release
- Network: BBC 2
- Release: 8 November 1970 – 18 February 1980
- Network: ITV
- Release: 27 December 1981 – 13 February 1982

The Goodies is a British television comedy series that aired in the 1970s and early 1980s. The series, which combines surreal sketches and sitcoms, was broadcast by the BBC, initially on BBC2 but soon repeated on BBC1, from 1970 to 1980. One seven-episode series was made for ITV company LWT and shown in 1981–82.

The show was co-written by and starred Tim Brooke-Taylor, Graeme Garden and Bill Oddie (together known as "The Goodies"). Bill Oddie also wrote the music and songs for the series, while "The Goodies Theme" was co-written by Oddie and Michael Gibbs. Directors/producers of the series were John Howard Davies, Jim Franklin and Bob Spiers.

An early title which was considered for the series was Narrow Your Mind (following on from Broaden Your Mind) and prior to that the working title was Super Chaps Three.

== Premise ==
The series' basic structure revolved around the trio, always short of money, offering themselves for hire – with the tagline "We Do Anything, Anytime, Anywhere" – to perform all sorts of ridiculous but generally benevolent tasks. Under this loose pretext, the show explored all sorts of off-the-wall scenarios for comedic potential. Many episodes parodied current events, such as an episode where the entire black population of South Africa emigrates to Great Britain to escape apartheid. This means that the white South Africans no longer have anyone to exploit and oppress; hence, they introduce a new system called "apart-height", where short people (Bill and a number of jockeys) are discriminated against.

Other storylines were more abstractly philosophical, such as an episode in which the trio spend Christmas Eve together waiting for the Earth to be blown up by prior arrangement of the world's governments. The Christmas Eve episode, titled "Earthanasia", was one of the two episodes which took place entirely in one room. The other, "The End", occurred when Graeme accidentally had their office encased in an enormous block of concrete. These episodes were made when the entire location budget for the series had been spent, forcing the trio to come up with a script shot entirely on the set that relied entirely on character interaction, a format known in the industry as a bottle episode.

== Episodes ==
The Goodies made 76 episodes (including specials).

=== Missing programmes ===
"Kitten Kong" (episode seven from series two) is the only episode of The Goodies that is officially missing from the BBC archives: the original video tape was wiped for reuse by the BBC in the 1970s. An expanded, more elaborate version of the original transmitted episode called Kitten Kong: Montreux '72 Edition does exist. It was made specially for the 1972 Montreux Golden Rose Festival; it has some minor differences from the version broadcast by the BBC in 1971.

Several other episodes that were originally screened in colour are also missing, but exist as black and white telerecordings made for overseas sales. "Come Dancing" was thought to exist only in this form until a videotape copy with weak colour was discovered. The colour was enhanced for DVD release in 2005.

== Production ==
The show featured extensive use of slapstick, often performed using speeded-up photography and clever, though low-budget, visual effects, such as when they built a railway station together and awoke the next morning to discover that some construction equipment outside (steam shovel, bulldozer, backhoe) had come to life and were lumbering, growling, and battling like dinosaurs. One episode featured them setting up a fake railway crossing as part of the plot, only to have an actual train pass through at high speed. This stunt was revealed to consist of a lorry with an image of a railway engine attached to its side passing behind them, combined with separate footage of an express train. They also used film editing to realize the "portable hole" device seen in cartoons, where a black circle placed on the ground becomes a hole that characters can disappear into or appear out of, followed by the hole being picked up and carried away.

Other episodes featured parodies of contemporary pop music composed by Oddie, some of which went on to substantial commercial success in the British charts, among them the hit single "Funky Gibbon" as well as character-based comedy. Some early episodes were interrupted by spoofs of contemporary TV commercials.

The group also acknowledges their debt to the usage of music in silent movies. In "The Movies" episode, they buy an old movie studio, and attempt to make their own epic film, Macbeth Meets Truffaut The Wonder Dog. After several 'takes', they argue and each begins to make his own movie in a different style (Tim makes an epic movie, Graeme makes a western and Bill makes a black-and-white silent movie). The episode finished with an extended silent movie segment, in which each movie comically interferes with the others.

== Characters ==
The characters' personae are based on stereotypes: Garden, a bright but bizarre "mad scientist"; Brooke-Taylor, a conservative, vain, sexually repressed, upper-class royalist coward; and Oddie, a scruffy, occasionally violent, left-leaning rebel from Lancashire. The characters played up to their stereotypes, debunking them but were not necessarily based on the actor playing the character, even though the actors played characters with their own names, and had some minor characteristics in common. In reality, Garden is a medical doctor, Brooke-Taylor was a lawyer who was not at all conservative ("But I had the double-barrelled name so I was always going to play the Tory") and Oddie was a pacifist, ornithologist and active environmentalist.

=== Dual Goodies roles ===
Episodes in which the Goodies appeared in other roles, including appearing as doubles of themselves – while also appearing in their usual roles of Tim, Bill and Graeme – included the following:

- "The Baddies" – Tim, Bill and Graeme also play robot duplicates of themselves
- Frankenfido – Bill appears as his own puppy son at the end
- "Daylight Robbery on the Orient Express" – Tim, Bill and Graeme also play mime duplicates of themselves
- "2001 & A Bit" – Tim, Bill and Graeme also play their own sons
  – (Bill as Bill Brooke-Taylor, Tim as Tim Garden and Graeme as Graeme Oddie)
- "Alternative Roots" – Graeme, Bill and Tim also play their own ancestors
  – (Graeme as his ancestor Keltic Kilty, Bill as his ancestor Kinda Kinky and Tim as his ancestor Kounty Kutie)
- "The End" – Tim, Bill and Graeme also play Goodies from the future
- "A Collection of Goodies (Special Tax Edition) & The Goodies – Almost Live" – the Goodies also appear as "Pan's Grannies"
- "Hunting Pink" – Tim also appears as his 'Great-uncle Butcher'
- "Kung Fu Kapers" – both Tim and Graeme dress up as their fictional relatives to try to fool Bill

=== Alternative Goodies roles ===
In two episodes The Goodies appear in alternative historic events as themselves:

- "Rome Antics", in which Tim, Bill and Graeme appeared as ancient Goodies (the episode takes place during the time of the Roman Empire).
- "War Babies", in which Tim, Bill and Graeme appeared as two-year-old Goodies (the episode takes place during the time of the Second World War).

=== Tim's uncles ===
Tim's uncles are featured in the following episodes:

- "Camelot" – Uncle Arthur King (aka "King, Arthur")
- "Farm Fresh Food" – Uncle Tom (played by John Le Mesurier)
- "Hunting Pink" – Great Uncle Butcher (played by Tim)

=== Monty Python spoofs and imitations ===
The Goodies was a consistently very popular show in the UK throughout its run in the 1970s. Because it seemed to appeal particularly to younger viewers, some critics dismissed it as a "children's programme" and juvenile in comparison to the other contemporary UK "alternative" comedy hit, Monty Python's Flying Circus. While this comparison irritated them, Oddie, Garden and Brooke-Taylor were old university friends of the Monty Python cast; they had worked together on several projects, including the Cambridge University Footlights Club revues, the radio show I'm Sorry, I'll Read That Again, and television shows such as Broaden Your Mind, Twice a Fortnight, and a number of the Amnesty International benefit shows.

At Last the 1948 Show was another show with multiple connections to the Pythons; it included the "Four Yorkshiremen" sketch, co-written and performed by Brooke-Taylor with John Cleese, Graham Chapman and Marty Feldman. Brooke-Taylor also co-wrote and appeared in How to Irritate People (with John Cleese, Graham Chapman and Michael Palin, among others). Brooke-Taylor also appeared in the Amnesty International benefit show The Secret Policeman's Other Ball, where he appeared with John Cleese and Graham Chapman in the skit "Cha, Cha, Cha", and also in John Cleese's skit "Top of the Form". Graeme Garden appears briefly as Max Von Sydow in the trailer for Monty Python and the Holy Grail, in reused footage from Twice a Fortnight.

Tim Brooke-Taylor and Bill Oddie were also responsible for introducing Eric Idle to the Footlights Club.

Goodies episodes in which Monty Python's Flying Circus was either parodied or alluded to included the following:

- "The Goodies and the Beanstalk" – At the end of this episode, John Cleese portrays a genie in the guise of a Monty Python character and uses the Python catchphrase, "And now for something completely different." When spotted and told to "Push off!" by Tim, he shouts dismissively, "Kids' programme!", before vanishing.
- "Invasion of the Moon Creatures" – the opening credits of Monty Python's Flying Circus can be seen when Graeme switches on the television. Graeme immediately switches off the television in disgust because he has missed what he wanted to see (Moira Anderson).
- "Fleet Street Goodies" – in which the Liberty Bell March (the theme for Monty Python's Flying Circus) can be heard.
- "Scatty Safari" – in which four Gumbies are featured.
- "The Goodies Rule – O.K.?" – in which two Gumbies, whom they address as John and Eric, are seen on Skid Row.
- "U-Friend or UFO?" – Bill plays the Liberty Bell March on the trombone with the aliens.
- "2001 & A Bit"- While the Goodies are reminiscing, Graeme mentions The Ministry of Silly Walks.

On a related note, the use of coconut shells to simulate horses, as seen in Monty Python and the Holy Grail (1975), is often attributed to Michael Palin, although the same device was used two years earlier in the episode "Hunting Pink".

== Awards and nominations ==
A special episode, which was based on the original 1971 Goodies' "Kitten Kong" episode, was called "Kitten Kong: Montreux '72 Edition", and was first broadcast in 1972. The Goodies won the Silver Rose in 1972 for this special episode at the Festival Rose d'Or, held in Montreux, Switzerland. In the first episode of the next series, "The New Office", Tim Brooke-Taylor can be seen painting the trophy gold.

The Goodies also won the Silver Rose in 1975 at the Festival Rose d'Or for their episode "The Movies".

The Goodies were twice nominated for Best Light Entertainment Programme at the BAFTA Awards in 1972 and 1976.

== See also ==
- The Goodies
- List of The Goodies episodes
- The Goodies discography – CD and LP releases
- The Goodies videography – DVD and VHS releases
