= I'm Sorry, I'll Read That Again =

BBC radio comedy series

- Genre: Sketch comedy
- Running time: 30 minutes
- Country of origin: United Kingdom
- Language: English
- Home station: BBC Home Service (series 1); BBC Light Programme (series 2–5); BBC Radio 2 (series 6–9)
- Syndicates: BBC Radio 4 Extra
- Starring: Tim Brooke-Taylor; John Cleese; Graeme Garden; David Hatch; Jo Kendall; Bill Oddie
- Original release: 3 April 1964 – 23 December 1973
- No. of episodes: 104 (excluding Cambridge Circus)

I'm Sorry, I'll Read That Again (often abbreviated as ISIRTA) is a BBC radio comedy programme that was developed from the 1964 Cambridge University Footlights revue, Cambridge Circus, as a scripted sketch show. It had a devoted youth following, with the live tapings enjoying very lively audiences, particularly when familiar themes and characters were repeated, a tradition that continued into the spinoff show I'm Sorry I Haven't a Clue.

The show ran for nine series and was first broadcast on 3 April 1964, a pilot programme having been broadcast on 30 December 1963 under the title "Cambridge Circus", on the BBC Home Service (renamed BBC Radio 4 in September 1967). Series 1 comprised three episodes. Subsequent series were broadcast on the BBC Light Programme (renamed BBC Radio 2 in September 1967). Series 2 (1965) had nine episodes, series 3 (1966) and series 6 to 8 (1968–1970) each had thirteen episodes, while series 4 (1966–67) and 5 (1967) both had fourteen episodes. After a three-year hiatus, the ninth and final series was transmitted in November and December 1973, with eight episodes. An hour-long 25th anniversary show was broadcast in 1989, comically introduced as "full frontal radio".

The title of the show derives from a phrase commonly used by BBC announcers in the age of live radio, following an on-air flub: "I'm sorry, I'll read that again." Basing the show's title on the phrase used to recover from a mistake set the tone for the series as an irreverent and loosely produced comedy show.

I'm Sorry I Haven't a Clue, an unscripted comedy panel game which is a spin-off from ISIRTA, was first produced in 1972 (invented by ISIRTA regular Graeme Garden, who was anxious to develop a comedy format that did not involve a script deadline each week).

== Cast ==
- Tim Brooke-Taylor (later one of the three members of The Goodies). He wrote humorous books on subjects including cricket and golf. He was a member of the cast of the television comedy series At Last the 1948 Show with John Cleese, Graham Chapman and Marty Feldman, and later appeared in Feldman's television comedy series Marty. He acted in many other television sitcoms, and appeared in the 1970s BBC radio sketch show Hello, Cheeky! with John Junkin and Barry Cryer, later translated to ITV. He also appeared in the 1971 film Willy Wonka & the Chocolate Factory in the uncredited role of the computer scientist. Brooke-Taylor died in April 2020, aged 79.
- John Cleese often assumed the name "John Otto Cleese" for the show. Cleese (later part of Monty Python and star of Fawlty Towers) formed his own production company Video Arts in the 1970s to make business training films, which contained much Python-esque/Basil Fawlty-style humour. He also made films including A Fish Called Wanda and Fierce Creatures. On the 25th anniversary ISIRTA show, he performed his silly walk and sang "The Ferret Song". He appeared in At Last the 1948 Show in 1967 with Tim Brooke-Taylor, Graham Chapman and Marty Feldman, and was co-writer with Graham Chapman of several episodes of the Doctor in the House television comedy series. In later series, Cleese was often absent, due to his appearances in Monty Python; in the sleeve notes to the BBC's re-issues of the shows on cassette, his absences were explained as "[having] ranting commitments elsewhere".
- Graeme Garden (also one of the three members of The Goodies). A medical doctor, Garden was cowriter with Bill Oddie of several episodes of the medical comedy Doctor in the House on ITV (appearing in the episode Doctor on the Box as a television presenter). He also appeared as Commander Forrest in the Yes Minister television episode The Death List. He was a member of I'm Sorry, I'll Read That Again from the start. At the same time he was studying medicine in London. Because he did a midwifery medical course in Plymouth, he was unable to be a member of the cast of ISIRTA during the third series, owing to the distance between London and Plymouth, which made commuting to record the shows impossible. However, Garden kept sending scripts for the radio show by mail and rejoined the cast upon his return to his medical studies in London.
- David Hatch (who was appointed to executive positions within the BBC, including Controller of BBC Radio 4), as was common in BBC radio at that time, served both as the show's announcer and as a cast member (similar to Douglas Smith's role in Round the Horne; Hatch, however, did give his roles some characterisation, in contrast to Smith's totally deadpan style). Hatch's announcements were frequently lampooned or interrupted by other cast members. In the 25th Anniversary special Hatch invited the audience to join them again in 25 years’ time. Ironically by 2014 Hatch, who had died in 2007, was the only cast member to have died.
- Jo Kendall (a radio actress in many straight dramas subsequently; also appeared in the radio comedy series The Burkiss Way). She also guest starred (as the voice of The Queen) in The Goodies 1980 episode "Goodies and Politics". Kendall died in January 2022.
- Bill Oddie (also one of the three members of The Goodies). He wrote many books and was an important spokesman on wildlife and ecological issues from the 1980s. Oddie wrote and performed a daft but well-crafted song in the middle of most ISIRTA programmes. He was cowriter (with Graeme Garden) of several episodes of the Doctor in the House television comedy series. He died in 2026 aged 85.
- Humphrey Barclay was the producer of ISIRTA until 1968; from April that year the task was shared by David Hatch and Peter Titherage. In 1973 production was shared by David Hatch with John Cassels (for six episodes) and with Bob Oliver Rogers (for two episodes).
- Music for the links and songs was provided by Dave Lee and his band. In keeping with the tradition of the Goons the band featured at the end of each show after the (brief) sign-off song. However, unlike the Goons there was no regular second spot during the show. Furthermore, rather than a live performance of a jazz standard, the tune at the end was a recording of them playing an up-tempo jazz piano trio number, composed by Lee specifically to act as a signature tune for the show.

== Influence ==
As well as giving rise to The Goodies team, ISIRTA shows the roots of the Monty Python team very clearly, with Cleese, Chapman and Eric Idle all regular script contributors. The show's creator Humphrey Barclay went on to create the TV show Do Not Adjust Your Set, featuring the rest of the Python team, as well as Idle.

ISIRTA's roots can be traced back to classic radio comedies like It's That Man Again and The Goon Show. As with Round the Horne, the cast's adventures would sometimes be episodic with cliff-hanger endings each week as with "The Curse of the Flying Wombat" (3rd series), and "Professor Prune And The Electric Time Trousers" (7th series). Christmas specials normally included a spoof of a traditional pantomime (or several combined). They had few qualms about the use of puns – old, strained or inventive – and included some jokes and catchphrases now considered politically incorrect. Garden's impressions of the rugby league commentator Eddie Waring and the Scottish TV presenter Fyfe Robertson, Oddie's frequent parodies of the game-show host Hughie Green, and Cleese's occasional but manic impressions of Patrick Moore (astronomer and broadcaster) also featured.

As the only woman on the show, Jo Kendall voiced all the female characters (with the exception of Brooke-Taylor's oversexed harridan, Lady Constance de Coverlet) and occasionally extended into having conversations with herself in different voices. (In one episode of the serial "The Curse of the Flying Wombat", not only did Kendall play two characters in the same scene but so did Tim Brooke-Taylor, resulting in a four way conversation between the two actors). Kendall also wrote some of her own material.

The show ended with an unchanging sign-off song, which Bill Oddie performed as "Angus Prune" and was referred to by the announcer as "The Angus Prune Tune". Spoof dramas were billed as Prune Playhouse and many parodies of commercial radio were badged as Radio Prune.

== Repeats and spinoffs ==
Several cast members appeared in the radio comedy panel game I'm Sorry I Haven't a Clue, a spinoff from ISIRTA that has outlived it by decades. Graeme Garden and Tim Brooke-Taylor continued as regulars on the show.

All series of ISIRTA have been rebroadcast on BBC Radio 4 Extra (available on digital television, DAB digital radio and the web), though some episodes (series 5 episodes 9 & 12, series 8 episode 2, and series 9 episodes 5 & 6) were not transmitted due to potentially offensive content. Infrequently, Australian listeners found ISIRTA in the 5.30am vintage comedy timeslot on ABC Radio National (available on the web to overseas listeners). It is not certain of the reasons due to its being pulled off-air, as this slot has now since been replaced with a business program.

The official story of ISIRTA was published in The Clue Bible by Jem Roberts, in 2009.

In 2015, plans were announced for a live "Best Of" homage show, using material by Garden and Oddie reworked by Barnaby Eaton-Jones, Jem Roberts and Dirk Maggs and performed by Hannah Boydell, David Clarke, Barnaby Eaton-Jones, William KV Browne and Ben Perkins. The show was a sell-out success at The Bacon Theatre, Cheltenham in February 2016 and a tour was licensed by Graeme Garden and Bill Oddie to the same company, the Offstage Theatre Group. In February 2017, it was announced that the British tour would take place later in the year, with guest appearances by Garden, Oddie, Taylor and Jo Kendall. In 2019 four new episodes with the slightly modified title "I'm Sorry I'll Read That Again... Again" were recorded and broadcast on Radio 4 Extra with some original cast including Tim Brooke Taylor, together with newer performers such as Barnaby Eaton-Jones.

== Prune Plays ==
Writers and cast in order of appearance:

Robin Hood
Written by Graeme Garden and John Cleese
Story narration – sung by David Hatch
'Curtain' – Tim Brooke-Taylor
Maid Marion – Jo Kendall
Friar Tuck – Bill Oddie
Robin Hood – Tim Brooke-Taylor
Alan 'a Gabriel – Graeme Garden
Will Scarlet – David Hatch
Little John – John Cleese
Sir Angus of the Prune – John Cleese
Grimbling (the Bailiff) – Bill Oddie
Sheriff of Nottingham – Graeme Garden
Master of Ceremonies for the 'Archery Competition' – John Cleese
Deputy Sheriff – Graeme Garden

The Curse of the Flying Wombat
Written by Graeme Garden and Bill Oddie
'King Lear' – John Cleese
Tim Brown-Windsor – Tim Brooke-Taylor
Mr. Hatch – David Hatch
Lady Fiona Rabbit-Vacuum (Jim-Lad) – Jo Kendall
Captain Cleese – John Cleese
'Lookout' – Bill Oddie
Casey O'Sullivan – Bill Oddie
Masher Wilkins – John Cleese
Maisie Robinson (the International Temptress) – Jo Kendall
Grimbling (Butler to Tim's Aunt) – Bill Oddie
Lady Constance de Coverlet – Tim Brooke-Taylor
"Hurricane" Flossie (Lady Constance's identical twin sister) – Tim Brooke-Taylor
Slave-girl trader – Bill Oddie
Colonel Clutch-Featheringhaugh – David Hatch
Nosebone (the Great White Hunter) – Bill Oddie
Wong (the Supply-keeper) – Tim Brooke-Taylor
Wong Tu (his brother) – John Cleese
'Armand' – Bill Oddie

== Commercial releases ==
A vinyl compilation album of sketches was released on the Parlophone label in 1967, and later reissued on a double cassette by EMI in 1993 alongside the London recording of Cambridge Circus. Another compilation was released by BBC Records in 1978, reissued on CD in 2011 as part of the Vintage Beeb range.

Four volumes of compilation cassettes were released by the BBC Radio Collection between 1989 and 1997 containing complete episodes. These were re-released on CD in 2007 alongside a fifth volume.

A tie-in book of sketches was published by Javelin in 1985, illustrated by Graeme Garden.
