= Graeme Garden =

Scottish comedian and actor (born 1943)

Graeme Garden OBE
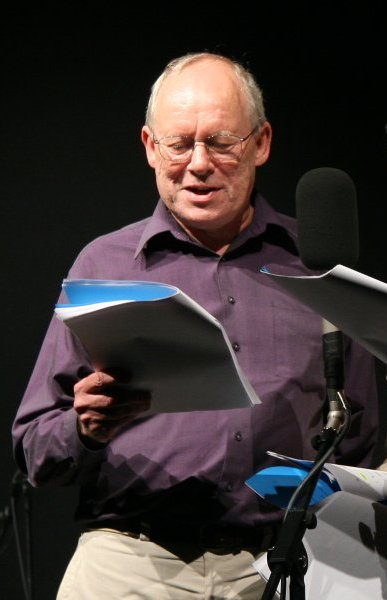
- Garden during a recording of You'll Have Had Your Tea in 2006
- Born: David Graeme Garden; 18 February 1943 (age 83); Aberdeen, Scotland
- Education: Emmanuel College, Cambridge
- Notable work: I'm Sorry, I'll Read That Again (1965–1973); Twice a Fortnight (1967); Broaden Your Mind (1968–1969); The Goodies (1970–1982); I'm Sorry I Haven't a Clue (1972–)
- Spouses: Mary Grice; Emma Garden
- Children: 3

Comedy career
- Years active: 1964–present
- Medium: Stand-up; radio; stage; television

David Graeme Garden (born 18 February 1943) is a Scottish comedian, actor, author, artist and television presenter. He is best known as a member of The Goodies and a regular panellist on I'm Sorry I Haven't a Clue. He is the only surviving member of The Goodies following the deaths of Tim Brooke-Taylor in 2020 and Bill Oddie in 2026.

== Early life and education ==
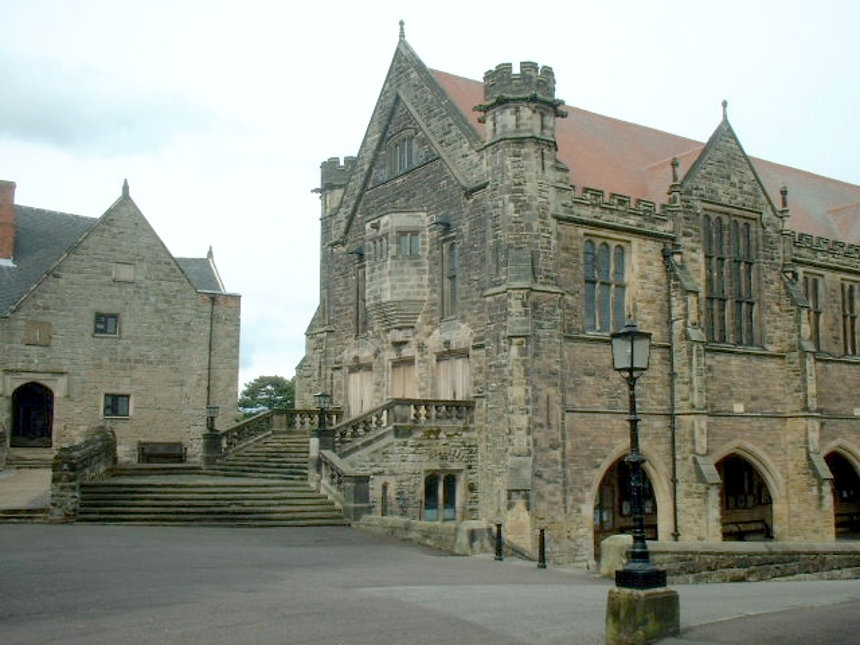
Garden was educated at Repton School in Derbyshire.

Garden was born on 18 February 1943 in Aberdeen, Scotland, and raised in Preston, Lancashire, England, the only son (with a daughter) of Robert Symon Garden (1910–1982), an eminent orthopaedic surgeon who created the Garden classification of hip fractures, and his wife Janet Ann (née McHardy). R. S. Garden's parents, John and Elizabeth, farmed at Macduff, Banff and Buchan, Aberdeenshire. Garden was educated at Repton School and studied medicine at Emmanuel College, Cambridge, where he joined the Cambridge University Footlights Dramatic Club. He served as its president in 1964, at the same time performing in the 1964 Footlights revue, Stuff What Dreams Are Made Of, at the Edinburgh Festival Fringe.

Garden qualified in medicine but has never practised. Asked how he justified making jokes rather than saving lives, he answered:

I don't think I would have done it as well. It's an interesting question – whether you've contributed more to the vast store of human enjoyment by doing comedy or by being a doctor, but the answer for me is that I don't think I would have been as successful or as happy being a doctor.

== Career ==
=== Radio ===
Garden was co-writer and performer in the BBC radio comedy sketch show I'm Sorry, I'll Read That Again in the late 1960s. Garden was studying medicine during the first few series of the show, this commitment making cast membership difficult for him during the third series as he was following a midwifery course in Plymouth. However, he continued sending in scripts for the radio show by mail, and he rejoined the cast upon his return to his medical studies in London. On several occasions, his medical qualifications are lampooned in the show; in the 25th Anniversary Show, David Hatch asks him if he is still a writer. Garden: "Here's something I wrote this morning". Hatch: "It's a prescription". "Yes," says Garden, "but it's a funny one..."

Garden was a permanent panellist for almost fifty years on the long-running BBC Radio improvisation show I'm Sorry I Haven't a Clue (ISIHAC), in a cast which included Tim Brooke-Taylor. He also starred in and co-wrote, with Barry Cryer, You'll Have Had Your Tea, a direct spin-off of ISIHAC, and has contributed to several books from the series, including guides to the game Mornington Crescent.

Garden wrote for and appeared Iin, alongside Barry Cryer and Alison Steadman, the 1989 BBC radio comedy sketch show The Long Hot Satsuma. Garden had a role in Paul B. Davies's 2000 radio play Spy Nozy and the Poets. In 2001 and 2002, Garden wrote for and appeared in the BBC radio comedy sketch show The Right Time, along with Eleanor Bron, Paula Wilcox, Clive Swift, Roger Blake and Neil Innes. He was also script editor for The Hudson and Pepperdine Show.

Garden is chair of the spoof radio game show Beat the Kids. He has also appeared on the UK version of the improvisation television series Whose Line Is It Anyway?, which has a similar format. He was a co-writer of the BBC Radio 4 comedy Giles Wemmbley-Hogg Goes Off and, in 2006, Garden co-devised and appeared on the BBC Radio 4 comedy quiz show The Unbelievable Truth. He also appeared in the BBC Radio 4 comedy series One, created by David Quantick.

In 2003, Garden wrote the Radio 4 sitcom About a Dog, based on an original idea by Debbie Barham, with a second series in 2007.

Garden has appeared in several of Big Finish's Doctor Who audio dramas. In Bang-Bang-a-Boom! he plays Professor Fassbinder, a parody of Victor Bergman in Space: 1999. In Max Warp he plays TV presenter Geoffrey Vantage, parodying Top Gear presenter Jeremy Clarkson. He plays Abbot Thelonious (an alias of the Meddling Monk) in the Eighth Doctor audio play The Book of Kells in 2010, and subsequently returns as a recurring antagonist to the Eighth Doctor as the Monk (a role previously played on television by Peter Butterworth).

=== Television ===
Garden's best known television work is freeform sitcom The Goodies, which he wrote and performed along with Tim Brooke-Taylor and Bill Oddie from 1970 to 1982. The three appeared in the Amnesty International show A Poke in the Eye (With a Sharp Stick) (during which they sang their hit song "Funky Gibbon"). Garden and Bill Oddie co-wrote many episodes of the television sitcom Doctor in the House, including most of the episodes of the first series and all of those of the second second, as well as co-writing episodes of the subsequent Doctor at Large and Doctor in Charge series. Garden was co-writer and performer in the sketch shows Twice a Fortnight, with Bill Oddie, Terry Jones, Michael Palin and Jonathan Lynn, and Broaden Your Mind with Tim Brooke-Taylor.

Garden and Oddie wrote, but did not perform in, a thirteen-episode science fiction sitcom called Astronauts for Central which was shown on ITV from 1981 to 1983. The show was set in an international space station in the near future.

For the 1983 children's animated television comedy series Bananaman Garden was the voices of the title character, General Blight, and Maurice of the Heavy Mob; the series also featured the rest of the Goodies team. Later, Garden wrote for the sitcom Surgical Spirit (1994). He has also presented three series of the BBC's health magazine Bodymatters.

Garden appeared in the political sitcom Yes Minister episode The Death List, playing Commander Forrest of Special Branch. He also appeared as a television presenter in the Doctor in the House episode "Doctor on the Box".

Garden was a regular team captain on the political satire game show If I Ruled the World. Brooke-Taylor appeared as a guest in one episode and during the game "I Couldn't Disagree More" he proposed that it was high time The Goodies episodes were repeated. Garden was obliged by the rules of the game to refute this statement, and replied, "I couldn't disagree more... it was time to repeat them ten, fifteen years ago."

In 2004, Garden and Brooke-Taylor were co-presenters of Channel 4's daytime game show Beat the Nation, in which they indulged in usual game show "banter", but took the quiz itself seriously. It was notable for its use of a "laugh track" instead of a studio audience. Garden has hosted the quiz game Tell the Truth and presented a series of history programmes, A Sense of the Past for Yorkshire Television.

Garden writes and directs for the corporate video company Video Arts, known for its training films starring John Cleese.

=== Stage appearances ===
Garden has a successful stage career, and has acted in several National Theatre productions, as well as London's West End. He has also acted in several BBC Radio 4 comedy drama series, and television dramas including Peak Practice and Holby City. Garden appeared with Tim Brooke-Taylor in the theatre production The Unvarnished Truth.

He wrote several pantomimes for The Theatre Chipping Norton during the 1980s.

In 1986 he appeared in a production of An Inspector Calls by J. B. Priestley at the Royal Exchange, Manchester.

Garden wrote a play called The Pocket Orchestra which ran in London in 2006. In August 2006, Garden and Brooke-Taylor joined up to perform at the Edinburgh Fringe in a show which looked back with some nostalgia to their work with the Goodies and in light entertainment.

== Personal life ==
Garden lives in Oxfordshire with his wife Emma, with whom he has a son, Tom. Garden also has a daughter, Sally, and a son, John, from his previous marriage to Mary Elizabeth Wheatley Grice. His son John "JJ" Garden is the occasional keyboard player for the music group Scissor Sisters, and shares songwriting credit on the song "The Other Side" from their 2006 album Ta-Dah.

In 2002, Garden suffered an episode of the condition known as Bell's palsy, where the muscles on one side of the face become paralysed. He was able to continue his work commitments and eventually made a full recovery after some months.

Garden accepted an Officer of the Order of the British Empire (OBE) in the 2011 Birthday Honours for services to light entertainment alongside his comedy partner Tim Brooke-Taylor.

Garden is a patron of the disability charity ENRYCH – formerly Ryder-Cheshire Volunteers. The charity works to enable adults with a physical disability to enjoy culture, leisure, learning and sporting opportunities through partnership with a volunteer.

== Bibliography ==
An incomplete list includes:

- The Best Medicine: Graeme Garden's Book of Medical Humour compiled and illustrated by Graeme Garden, published by Robson Books Ltd., London (1984), ISBN 0-86051-295-9
- The Skylighters
- The Seventh Man
- Graeme Garden's Compendium of Very Silly Games
- Stovold's Mornington Crescent Almanac

Co-written with the other members of The Goodies:

- The Goodies File
- The Goodies Book of Criminal Records
- The Making of The Goodies Disaster Movie

Poetry:

- "The man who invented time travel". Andromeda Spaceways Inflight Magazine. 45: 101. 2010.
