= The Goodies =

Trio of British comedians known for the TV series of the same name

- Left to right: Bill Oddie, Tim Brooke-Taylor, Graeme Garden in a screenshot from the title sequence of the BBC television series
- Past Members: Tim Brooke-Taylor, Graeme Garden, Bill Oddie
- Genre: Sketch comedy, surreal humour
- Media: Television, theatre, audio recordings
- Years active: 1970–1982; 2005–2006
- Status: Inactive
- Notable works: The Goodies (1970–1982); The Goodies – stage shows (2005–2006)
- Other works (starring all three Goodies): I'm Sorry, I'll Read That Again (1964–1973) (25th anniversary special 1989); Broaden Your Mind (1968–1969)
- Fan club website: The Official Goodies Rule – OK!

The Goodies were a trio of British comedians: Tim Brooke-Taylor (1940–2020), Graeme Garden (born 1943) and Bill Oddie (1941–2026). The trio created, wrote for and performed in their eponymous television comedy show from 1970 until 1982, combining sketches and situation comedy.

== Beginnings ==
The three met each other while undergraduates at the University of Cambridge, where Brooke-Taylor (Pembroke) was a law student, Garden (Emmanuel) was studying medicine and Oddie (Pembroke) was reading English. Their contemporaries included Graham Chapman, John Cleese and Eric Idle, who later became members of Monty Python, and with whom they became close friends. Brooke-Taylor and Cleese studied together and swapped lecture notes, for they were both law students, but at different colleges within the university. All three future Goodies became members of the Cambridge University Footlights Club, with Brooke-Taylor becoming president in 1963, and Garden succeeding him as president in 1964.

In 1965, Eric Idle succeeded Garden as Footlights Club president. Idle had initially become aware of the Footlights when he auditioned for a "Smoking Concert" at Pembroke College in front of Brooke-Taylor and Oddie.

== Career before The Goodies ==
Brooke-Taylor, Garden and Oddie were cast members of the 1960s BBC radio comedy show I'm Sorry, I'll Read That Again, which also featured John Cleese, David Hatch and Jo Kendall, and lasted until 1973. I'm Sorry, I'll Read That Again resulted from the 1963 Cambridge University Footlights Club revue A Clump of Plinths. After having its title changed to Cambridge Circus, the revue went on to play in the West End in London, England, followed by a tour of New Zealand, then on Broadway in New York City, including an appearance on the Ed Sullivan Show.

They also took part in various TV shows with other people, including Brooke-Taylor in At Last the 1948 Show (with Cleese, Chapman and Marty Feldman). Brooke-Taylor also took part in Marty (with Marty Feldman, John Junkin and Roland MacLeod). In 1968 Brooke-Taylor appeared with Cleese, Michael Palin and Graham Chapman in How to Irritate People. Garden and Oddie took part in Twice a Fortnight (with Michael Palin, Terry Jones and Jonathan Lynn), before Brooke-Taylor, Garden, and Oddie worked on the late-1960s TV show Broaden Your Mind, of which only about ten minutes survives.

== The Goodies television series ==
The original BBC television series ran from November 1970 to February 1980 on BBC 2, with 67 half-hour episodes and two forty-five-minute Christmas specials. The series was created by Tim Brooke-Taylor, Graeme Garden and Bill Oddie, and originally co-written by all three. Oddie provided the music for the show. Later episodes were co-written by Garden and Oddie.

It was one of the first shows in the UK to use chroma key and one of the first to use stop-motion techniques in a live action format. Other effects include hand editing for repeated movement, mainly used to make animals "talk" or "sing", and play speed effects as used in the episode "Kitten Kong". In the series, the threesome travelled on, and frequently fell off, a three-seater bicycle known to them as a 'trandem'.

In September 1978, the trio appeared in character in an episode of the BBC1 television game show Star Turn Challenge, presented by Bernard Cribbins, in which teams of celebrities competed in acting games. Their opponents were three members of the cast of The Liver Birds, Nerys Hughes, Elizabeth Estensen and Michael Angelis. They also presented the Christmas 1976 edition of Disney Time from the toy department of Selfridges store in London, broadcast on BBC1 on Boxing Day at 5.50 pm.

The Goodies never had a formal contract with the BBC, and when the BBC Light Entertainment budget for 1980 was exhausted by the production of The Hitchhiker's Guide to the Galaxy TV series, the Goodies signed a contract with London Weekend Television (LWT) for ITV. However, after one half-hour Christmas special ("Snow White 2") in 1981, and a six-part series in early 1982, the series was cancelled. In later interviews the cast suggest the reasons were mainly economic, and that a typical Goodies sketch was more expensive than it appeared.

=== Awards and nominations ===
"The Goodies" won the Silver Rose at the Festival Rose d'Or, held in Montreux, Switzerland, in 1972 for a special episode, based on the original 1971 Goodies' "Kitten Kong" episode, titled "Kitten Kong: Montreux '72 Edition". In the first episode of the next series, "The New Office", Tim Brooke-Taylor can be seen painting the trophy gold.

"The Goodies" was nominated for a BAFTA for Best Light Entertainment Programme in 1972, losing to The Benny Hill Show.

"The Goodies" won the Silver Rose in 1975 at the Festival Rose d'Or for their episode "The Movies".

"The Goodies" was nominated for a BAFTA for Best Light Entertainment Programme in 1976, losing to The Two Ronnies.

=== International releases and repeats of the TV series ===
==== Britain ====
The Goodies' style of humour earned it a reputation as a "children's" programme

Unlike many long-running BBC comedy series, The Goodies has not enjoyed extensive repeats on terrestrial television in the UK. In 1986, BBC2 broadcast the episode "Kitten Kong" during a week of programmes screened under the banner "TV-50", when the BBC celebrated 50 years of broadcasting. In the late 1980s the pan-European satellite-channel Super Channel broadcast a couple of episodes, and the short-lived Comedy Channel broadcast some of the later Goodies episodes in the early 1990s. Later UK Gold screened many of the earlier episodes, often with commercial timing cuts. The same episodes subsequently aired on UK Arena, also cut. When UK Arena became UK Drama, later UKTV Drama, The Goodies was dropped along with its other comedy and documentary shows.

The cast finally took matters into their own hands and arranged with Network Video for the release of a digitally remastered 'best of' selection entitled The Goodies ... At Last on VHS and Region 0 DVD in April 2003. A second volume, The Goodies ... At Last a Second Helping was released on Region 2 in February 2005. Series 9 (including the Xmas special) was released on Region 2 as The Goodies – The Complete LWT Series in March 2007. A fourth volume The Goodies ... At Last Back for More, Again was released on region 2 in 2010 and a DVD box set containing all four volumes was released to celebrate 40 years of The Goodies.

In 2004, an episode of the BBC documentary series Comedy Connections was devoted to the Goodies. During Christmas that year, Channel 5 repeated the classic 1973 episode "The Goodies and the Beanstalk". Christmas 2005 saw a 90-minute Goodies special, a documentary about the series, Return of the Goodies, broadcast on BBC Two.

Early in 2006, a single episode ("Winter Olympics") was broadcast on BBC Two. In February 2007, the 1982 LWT series was repeated on pay-TV channel Paramount 2.

In December 2010, BBC Two showed selected late-night repeats of the BBC series, which ran nightly from 23 to 30 December. This apparent gesture followed years of campaigning by The Goodies that the shows had not been repeated like other BBC shows such as Dad's Army, Only Fools and Horses and Some Mothers Do 'Ave 'Em. The episodes shown were: "Bunfight at the O.K. Tea Rooms" / "Earthanasia" / "The Goodies and the Beanstalk" / "Kitten Kong" / "Lighthouse Keeping Loonies" / "Saturday Night Grease" / "The Baddies" (a.k.a. "Double Trouble") and "The Stone Age".

"Scoutrageous", "Kung Fu Kapers" and "Scotland" (a.k.a. "Loch Ness Monster") were originally billed as episodes 1, 2 and 7 of the repeat run. The episodes garnered good ratings given their time slot, and the first six episodes were taken from the BBC's own master tapes, rather than the digital remasters, the rights to which are currently owned by Network Video. "The Baddies" and "The Stone Age" have never been digitally remastered.

In June 2014, during a 1970s weekend, BBC Two repeated the Montreux '72 Edition of "Kitten Kong" once again. This has been the only episode to be repeated twice, and no full series have been repeated since.

In September 2018, Network released a box set titled The Goodies: The Complete BBC Collection. This set contains every single episode from 1970-1980, excepting the lost, original version of "Kitten Kong", and, as a bonus feature, a one-hour edit of the show "An Audience with the Goodies", hosted by Stewart Lee and filmed live at Leicester Square in June 2018.

In late September 2022 the TV channel 'That's TV' (numbered 183 on SKY TV listings and 65 on Freeview) started showing the BBC episodes, one episode every day. Some episodes are being aired in poor quality and/or black & White as the tapes were sadly wiped for reuse by the BBC in the 1970s.

Although there is a message before each episode stating; 'This programme reflects the standards, language and attitudes of its time. Some viewers may find this content offensive', it seems that not all episodes are being aired - noticeably the 'Kitten Kong', 'Special Tax Edition' & 'The Goodies Rule – O.K.?' specials, but also series 2 episodes 'Pollution', 'The Lost Tribe', 'Come Dancing', 'Gender Education, 'Charity Bounce' & 'The Baddies', series 3 episode 'Superstar', series 4 episodes 'The Goodies and the Beanstalk' & 'The Race', series 5 episodes 'Scatty Safari' & 'South Africa' were not aired, with no notice or reason given.

==== Australia ====
In Australia, the series has had continued popularity. It was especially popular when it was repeated through the 1970s and 1980s by the ABC. As the show was typically broadcast in the 25-minute 6:00 pm children's timeslot, portions often had to be cut. The 1981-82 LWT series was played once on the Seven Network in the early 1980s. The ABC screened the BBC episodes again in the early 1990s, but skipped several stories due to either inappropriate material for a children's timeslot, or a lack of colour prints at the time. The BBC episodes were heavily edited to allow time for commercials when repeated on Network Ten in the 1990s. They were shown on the pay television channel UK.TV during the late 1990s and early 2000s, where they were screened in full. ABC2 ran re-runs of the series, beginning in 2010.

Three of the Goodies DVDs are available in Australia under different titles to the UK releases: The Goodies: 8 Delicious Episodes, The Goodies: A Tasty Second Helping and The Goodies: The Final Episodes, respectively. The Goodies' DVDs are also available in a boxed set with a commemorative booklet (The Goodies: The Tasty Box). This collection contains the same 16 episodes as the original two DVD releases but with additional material such as commentaries on several episodes and the original scripts of some episodes in PDF format.

Picture quality has been greatly improved using digital restoration techniques and the episode "Come Dancing", which was originally thought to only have survived as a black-and-white film recording, is presented in colour from a 625-line low-band broadcast standard PAL VT recording, made for training purposes, which has had the low-level colour boosted. The original Australian DVD release, The Goodies – A Tasty Second Helping (2 disc set), and The Goodies – A Second Helping: 4 tasty serves (1 Disc), featured the b/w telerecording of this episode.

==== Canada ====
In Canada, the series was shown in on the CBC national broadcast network in the late 1970s and early 1980s, in the traditional "after school" time slot, later a Friday night 10 pm slot, and occasionally in a midnight slot. Several episodes were shown on the CTV Television Network. In the mid-1970s it was shown on TVOntario on Saturday evenings, repeated on Thursday evenings, until it was replaced by Doctor Who in 1976.

==== Germany ====
In Germany in 1972, German TV screened the 13-part variety show Engelbert and the Young Generation, a co-production between the BBC and German station ZDF in which The Goodies appeared in short 3-to-4-minute film sequences. The first six of these sequences were culled from the first and second series of The Goodies: "Pets" (from "Kitten Kong"), "Pop Festival" (from "The Music Lovers"), "Keep Fit" (from "Commonwealth Games"), "Post Office" (from "Radio Goodies"), "Sleepwalking" (from "Snooze") and "Factory Farm" (from "Fresh Farm Foods").

There were seven new film sequences, "Good Deed Day", "The Gym", "The Country Code", "Street Entertainers", "Plum Pudding", "Bodyguards" and "Pan's Grannies". These featured intro sequences with host Engelbert Humperdinck visiting the Goodies at their office. The shows were dubbed into German, and because the Goodies part of the shows was more visual than dialogue-based, it translated very well.

Five of these new films were also cut together, with a new story involving The Goodies filling out their "Tax Evasion" form, as a special 25-minute Goodies compilation episode, "A Collection of Goodies", first broadcast on BBC1 at 8.15 pm on 24 September 1972, and produced by Jim Franklin. "The Country Code" and "Bodyguards" were not used.

==== New Zealand ====
In New Zealand, the series was originally shown in full by the NZBC (later TV One) during the 1970s and 1980s. Since then, it has been re-run on SKY Network Television's Comedy Central.

==== Spain ====
In Spain, a couple of episodes of The Goodies were shown as part of a season of television-award-winning programmes (the Goodies were Montreux Festival winners) on TVE 2 entitled Festival TV in 1981.

==== United States ====
In the US, the series was shown widely in syndication during the late 1970s and early 1980s, but has been little seen since. It was shown also on PBS stations, sometimes in tandem with Monty Python's Flying Circus.

== Books ==
=== Goodies books, written by the Goodies ===
In their heyday The Goodies also produced successful books:

- The Goodies File – Tim Brooke-Taylor, Graeme Garden and Bill Oddie, Sphere Books Ltd., London 1975. (This book was reprinted eight times between 1976 and 1981)
- The Goodies Book of Criminal Records – Tim Brooke-Taylor, Graeme Garden and Bill Oddie, Sphere Books Ltd., London 1975
- The Making of The Goodies Disaster Movie – Tim Brooke-Taylor, Graeme Garden and Bill Oddie, Weidenfeld & Nicolson Ltd., London 1977. (First Sphere Books Ltd., London edition 1978)

=== Books about the Goodies, written by other people ===
- The Complete Goodies – Robert Ross, B T Batsford, London, 2000
- The Goodies Rule OK – Robert Ross, Carlton Books Ltd, Sydney, 2006
- The Clue Bible: The Fully Authorised History of ISIHAC – Jem Roberts, Preface Publishing 2009
- The Goodies Superchaps Three – Andrew Pixley, 2011
- The Goodies Episode Summaries – Brett Allender
- The Goodies – Fact File – Matthew K. Sharp
- The Goodies, the name of a chapter (pages 162−179) within the book From Fringe to Flying Circus – Celebrating a Unique Generation of Comedy 1960–1980 – Roger Wilmut, Eyre Methuen Ltd, 1980

== Goodies songs ==
"All Things Bright and Beautiful" was released as a single credited to The Goodies in 1973, although it had been recorded in 1966 when they were part of I'm Sorry, I'll Read That Again.

The first true Goodies album, The Goodies Sing Songs From The Goodies, was released in 1973 and reissued as The World of the Goodies in 1974. "The Goodies Theme" was released as a single in 1973.

They had a string of successful chart singles penned by Bill Oddie. In 1974–75, they chalked up five hit singles in twelve months: "The Inbetweenies", "Black Pudding Bertha", "Nappy Love" and "The Funky Gibbon" (all performed during the episode "The Goodies – Almost Live"), and "Make a Daft Noise for Christmas".

"The Funky Gibbon" was their biggest hit, reached number 4 in the UK Singles Chart. The Goodies made an appearance on Top of the Pops with the song. They also performed it during the Amnesty International show A Poke in the Eye (with a Sharp Stick). "The Funky Gibbon" became a favourite in the United States on Dr. Demento's radio shows and reached number 79 on the Billboard Hot 100 in 1975.

The New Goodies LP, which featured most of the hit singles, reached number 25 on the UK Albums Chart in 1975.

=== Goodies Theme ===
Three variations of the Goodies Theme were used on the opening titles for the 1970–1982 television series. Apart from the original Goodies Theme, used from 1970 to 1972 and released as a single, two other variations surfaced, one, with a contemporary feel from 1973–1974, sung by Bill and then the third and final theme for the rest of the series from 1975 onwards, again sung by Bill. This variation lasted for the rest of the TV series and also surfaced on later Goodies LPs and, eventually, singles.

== Other collaborations ==
Tim Brooke-Taylor was a writer/performer on the television comedy series At Last the 1948 Show (which also included John Cleese, Graham Chapman and Marty Feldman in the cast), in which Eric Idle and Bill Oddie guest-starred in some of the episodes. The famous "Four Yorkshiremen" sketch was co-written by the four writers/performers of the series – Tim Brooke-Taylor, John Cleese, Graham Chapman and Marty Feldman.

Tim Brooke-Taylor was a cast member of the television comedy series Marty with Marty Feldman and John Junkin – a compilation of the two series of Marty has been released on a DVD with the title of It's Marty.

Brooke-Taylor was also a cast member of John Cleese's special How to Irritate People.

Along with John Junkin and Barry Cryer, Brooke-Taylor was a regular cast member of the long-running Radio 2 comedy sketch show Hello, Cheeky!, which ran from 1973 to 1979. The series also transferred to Yorkshire Television for two series in 1975 and 1976.

Tim Brooke-Taylor also appeared on BBC's hospital comedy TLC, as well as the sitcoms You Must Be The Husband (with Diane Keen and Sheila Steafel), and Me and My Girl (with Richard O'Sullivan and Joan Sanderson). He also played in a televised pro-celebrity golf match opposite Bruce Forsyth.

Graeme Garden and Bill Oddie were writers/performers on the television comedy series Twice a Fortnight (which also included Terry Jones, Michael Palin and Jonathan Lynn in the cast).

Tim Brooke-Taylor and Graeme Garden were writers/performers on the television comedy series Broaden Your Mind, with Bill Oddie joining them for the second series.

The three writers and performers also collaborated on the 1983 animated children's programme Bananaman, where they played various voice roles.

Bill Oddie has occasionally appeared on the BBC Radio 4 panel game I'm Sorry I Haven't a Clue, on which Garden and Brooke-Taylor are regular panellists.

Graeme Garden and Bill Oddie worked on the television comedy Doctor in the House: they co-wrote most of the first series and all of the second. Garden also appeared as a television interviewer in the series, in the episode titled "On the Box".

Between 1981 and 1983 Garden and Oddie wrote, but did not perform in, a science fiction sitcom called Astronauts for Central and ITV. The show was set in a British space station in the near future.

Garden was a regular team captain on the political satire game show If I Ruled the World. Brooke-Taylor appeared as a guest in one episode, and during the game "I Couldn't Disagree More" he proposed that it was high time The Goodies episodes were repeated. Garden was obliged by the rules of the game to refute this statement, and replied "I couldn't disagree more...it was time to repeat them ten, fifteen years ago." This was followed by uproarious applause from the studio audience.

In 2004, Garden and Brooke-Taylor were co-presenters of Channel 4's daytime game show Beat the Nation, in which they indulged in usual game show "banter", but took the quiz itself seriously. Oddie hosts a very successful series of nature programmes for the BBC.

== Goodies reunion shows ==
=== 2005 Australian reunion shows ===
The trio reunited in Australia for The Goodies (Still A) Live on Stage as part of Sydney's Big Laugh Comedy Festival in March 2005. The show toured the country, visiting Melbourne, Brisbane and Canberra and selling out most of the 13 performances.

A further Australian tour by the Goodies, sans Bill, took place during November and December 2005.

=== "Return of the Goodies" (2005) ===
On 30 December, BBC2 broadcast a feature-length special, featuring some new material by Brooke-Taylor, Garden and Oddie, linking clips from the original television series and interview footage.

=== 2006 and 2007 UK reunion shows ===
Tim Brooke-Taylor and Graeme Garden took their Goodies Live show to the 2006 Edinburgh Fringe festival. The show was similar to the second leg of the Goodies Australian tour, with Bill Oddie participating via video, due to his many filming commitments. The show was performed at the Paramount Comedy Festival in Brighton in October 2006.

Brooke-Taylor and Garden performed the show at 22 further UK venues in 2007.

=== 2009 World's Funniest Island and Riverside ===
Tim Brooke-Taylor and Graeme Garden appeared at Sydney's Riverside Theatre (Parramatta) on 15 October 2009 and the World's Funniest Island comedy festival on Cockatoo Island, Sydney Harbour on 17–18 October 2009. The show was hosted by Andrew Hansen of Australian comedy team The Chaser.

=== 2010 The One Show ===
On 4 November 2010, The Goodies were reunited when the BBC1 magazine and chat show The One Show brought them back together.

=== 2013: An Oldie but a Goodie ===
IN June 2013, Bill Oddie toured Australia to present a series of one-man shows, An Oldie but a Goodie. The tour took in Brisbane, Sydney, Melbourne, Adelaide and Perth. A video with the three Goodies was shown during the shows.

On 19 June 2013, Oddie made personal appearances on The Project and the Adam Hills Tonight television shows in conjunction with the tour.

=== 2019: The Big Ben Theory ===
The final time that The Goodies collaborated on a commercially available project was a single, hour-long audiobook created for Audible UK, entitled The Big Ben Theory. Scripted by Gareth Gwynn and John-Luke Roberts, along with Graeme Garden and Bill Oddie, and recorded in front of a highly appreciative live audience, the cast comprised Tim, Bill (an indisposed Graeme was replaced at the last minute by the project's originator and producer, Barnaby Eaton-Jones), Joanna Lumley, Philip Pope, Jon Culshaw and Kate Harbour, with direction from Dirk Maggs.

Graeme Garden's own description reads ‘As Parliament falls apart and sinister dictators threaten the world, Tim, Graeme and Bill must save the day. They defeated Kitten Kong! They stuffed the Funky Gibbon! They invented Ecky Thump! Can they save Parliament as well? 52% say yes. 48% say no. But you just can't rely on statistics, can you?!’ The audiobook, released by Audible in October 2019, was intended to be the pilot for a forthcoming series of new episodes to be written and recorded in 2020. The project ended with Tim Brooke-Taylor’s death from complications from COVID-19 on 12 April that year in Cookham, Berkshire, aged 79.

In January 2022, a series of novellas based on the planned Audible episodes was set to be published by Chinbeard Books, commencing with "Avengers Dissemble", adapted by producer and writer Barnaby Eaton Jones, with a foreword by Joanna Lumley, and based on material co-devised with the Goodies. The first book is dedicated to Tim Brooke-Taylor, two years since his death from COVID-19 complications and published with the backing of Tim's family and the two remaining Goodies: Graeme Garden and Bill Oddie, with a percentage of the royalties going to the charity Tim was President of for over 25 years – Thames Valley Adventure Playground.

== Cultural influence ==
The Mighty Boosh was started when Julian Barratt asked Noel Fielding if he wanted to make a modern-day Goodies.

The official Goodies fan club's (Goodies Rule-OK!) newsletter is called the Clarion & Globe. It was named after the newspaper in The Goodies' episode "Fleet Street Goodies", a.k.a. "Cunning Stunts".

In the 1970s, Cor!! comic, released by Fleetway publications, had a Goodies comics strip. When the comic later merged with Buster, the Goodies did not move across, although the TV show was still running.

Australian rock band Spiderbait released a 1993 album and EP which contained a rocked-up fast cover version of the Goodies song "Run".

Australian theatre company Shaolin Punk produced a short play titled "A Record or an OBE", written by Melbourne comedian and actor Ben McKenzie, and featuring Tim and Graeme as characters. Set in 1975, the two remaining Goodies struggle to carry on after Bill leaves the group to pursue a music career. The play premiered in the 2007 Melbourne Fringe Festival, where it was highly commended in the Comedy category. Later seasons were also performed for the Adelaide Fringe and Melbourne International Comedy Festival in 2008.

U.S. rock band The White Stripes named their 6th album Icky Thump in reference to The Goodies sketch "The Battle of Ecky Thump". The name was changed from "Ecky Thump" to "Icky Thump" to make the title more palatable to an American teenage audience.

== Honours ==
All three Goodies were awarded OBEs. Bill Oddie received his OBE in 2003 for wildlife conservation, while Tim Brooke-Taylor and Graeme Garden received their OBEs in 2011 for services to light entertainment. The show often mocked OBEs: in particular, a running joke was that Tim desperately wanted to receive one.

== Awards ==
All three Goodies have been regular attendees at Slapstick Festival in Bristol, and in 2011 they were awarded the Aardman Slapstick Visual Comedy Legend Award at the festival for the significant contributions to the field of visual comedy they have made during their careers.

== Viewer incidents ==
On 24 March 1975, Alex Mitchell, a 50-year-old bricklayer from King's Lynn, literally died laughing while watching an episode of The Goodies. According to his wife, who was a witness, Mitchell was unable to stop laughing whilst watching a sketch in the episode "Kung Fu Kapers" in which Tim Brooke-Taylor, dressed as a kilted Scotsman, used a set of bagpipes to defend himself from a black pudding-wielding Bill Oddie (master of the ancient Lancastrian martial art "Ecky-Thump") in a demonstration of the Scottish martial art of "Hoots-Toot-ochaye". After twenty-five minutes of continuous laughter, Mitchell finally slumped on the settee and died from heart failure. His widow later sent the Goodies a letter thanking them for making Mitchell's final moments so pleasant. In 2012, Mitchell's granddaughter was diagnosed with Long QT Syndrome after suffering cardiac arrest. Because this condition is genetic, it is believed that Mitchell's heart failure was triggered by an undiagnosed case of LQTS.

On 1 November 1977, Seema Bakewell, a 32-year-old housewife from Leicester, went into labour whilst laughing at a sketch in the Goodies episode "Alternative Roots". She refused to leave home for the hospital until the episode had finished. Thirty years later, she visited the 2007 UK reunion tour with "her baby, Ayesha, and the baby's husband" and recounted the story to Graeme Garden.

== See also ==
- List of The Goodies episodes
- The Goodies discography
- The Goodies videography
