= List of UK radio programmes =

0-9

This is an incomplete list.

== 0-9 ==
- 15 Minute Drama
- 15 Minute Musical
- 15 Storeys High
- 1834
- 1966 and All That
- 2000 Years of Radio
- 20th Century Vampire
- 3 for All
- 606
- The 7th Dimension
- The 99p Challenge

== A ==
- Absolute Power
- Acropolis Now
- Across the Universe
- Adam and Joe
- The Adventures of John and Tony
- After Henry
- Afternoon Theatre
- The Alan Davies Show
- Aliens in the Mind
- All Change
- All Gas and Gaiters
- And This is Them
- Another Digance Indulgence
- Any Answers?
- Any Questions?
- The Archers
- Arrested Development
- Arthur Smith's Balham Bash
- As Time Goes By
- At Home with the Hardys
- The Attractive Young Rabbi
- Audio Diaries
- Awayday

== B ==
- Babblewick Hall
- BBC OS
- BBC World Theatre
- Ballylenon
- Balti Kings
- Bandwagon
- Bangers and Mash
- Barrymore Plus Four
- Bearded Ladies
- Bernie Clifton's Comedy Shop
- Between the Ears
- Beyond the Back of Beyond
- Beyond the Pole
- Beyond Our Ken
- The Big Booth
- The Big Fun Show
- Big Jim and the Figaro Club
- The Big Top 40 Show
- The Big Town All Stars
- The Bigger Issues
- Blake's 7
- Book at Bedtime
- Bookcases
- Booked!
- Brain of Britain
- The Brains Trust
- Brian Appleton's History of Rock 'n' Roll
- Brian Gulliver's Travels
- Bristow
- Broadcasting House
- The Boosh (radio series)

== C ==
- Cabaret on 4
- The Cabaret Upstairs
- Cabin Pressure
- Caesar the Geezer
- Caribbean Voices
- A Case for Dr. Morelle
- Central 822
- Chambers
- The Change
- Children's Favourites
- Children's Hour
- Children's Hour with Armstrong and Miller
- The Circle
- Clare in the Community
- Cliffhanger
- The Clitheroe Kid
- Comedy Album Heroes
- Coming Alive
- Composer of the Week
- Concrete Cow
- The Consultants
- Count Arthur Strong's Radio Show
- Counterpoint
- Cousin Bazilio
- The Craig Charles Funk and Soul Show
- Crème de la Crime
- The Cumberland Sausage Show
- Curlew in Autumn

== D ==
- Dad's Army
- Dan and Nick: The Wildebeest Years
- Dead Man Talking
- Dead Ringers
- Dedicated Troublemaker
- Delve Special
- The Department
- Desert Island Discs
- Dick Barton, Special Agent
- Digital Planet
- Do Go On
- Dr Finlay's Casebook
- Doctor in the House
- Doctor at Large
- Doctor Thorne
- Doctor Who
- Does the Team Think?
- Double Bill
- Down the Line
- Down Your Way

== E ==
- Earthsearch
- Ectoplasm
- Elastic Planet
- Elephants to Catch Eels
- ElvenQuest
- The Embassy Lark
- Erratically Charged
- Europe Today
- Exes

== F ==
- Fab TV
- Face the Facts
- Faithful Departed
- The Fall of the Mausoleum Club
- Family Favourites
- Fanshawe Gets to the Bottom of...
- Farming Today
- Fat Chance
- Feedback
- Fellah's Hour with The Cheese Shop
- File on 4
- Fist of Fun
- Five Squeezy Pieces
- Flight of the Conchords
- Flying the Flag
- The Food Programme
- Foothill Fables
- The Forum
- The Foundation Trilogy
- Four Joneses and a Jenkins
- Frank Muir Goes Into...
- Frankie Howerd's Forum
- Friday Night is Music Night
- From Our Own Correspondent
- From the Bookshelf/Shelf
- Front Row

== G ==
- GALAXY
- Gardeners' Question Time
- The Ghost at Number Ten
- Girlies
- A Good Read
- The Good Human Guide
- The Goon Show
- Graham Norton's News Lasso
- Grassblade Jungle
- Grease Monkeys
- The Griff Rhys Jones Show
- The Grumbleweeds Radio Show
- Guilty Party

== H ==
- Hancock's Half Hour
- HARDTalk
- The Hare Lane Diaries
- Harvey and the Wallbangers
- Haunted
- Heated Rollers
- Hello, Cheeky!
- Hirsty's Daily Dose
- The Hislop Vote
- A History of the World in 100 Objects
- hit40uk
- Hitchhiker's Guide to the Future
- The Hitchhiker's Guide to the Galaxy
- Hoax!
- The Hobbit
- Home Truths
- Host Planet Earth
- House of Unspeakable Secrets
- How Things Began
- Huddwinks
- The Hudson and Pepperdine Show
- The Human Zoo

== I ==
- I'm Glad You Asked Me That
- I'm Sorry I Haven't A Clue
- I'm Sorry, I'll Read That Again
- The Impressionists
- In Conversation
- The In Crowd
- In One Ear
- In the End
- Injury Time
- Inman and Friends
- Inner Voices
- Inspector West at Bay
- The Iron Road
- It'll Never Last...
- It's That Man Again
- It's Your Round

== J ==
- Jamaica Inn
- Jammin'
- Jeremy Hardy Speaks to the Nation
- John Shuttleworth's Open Mind
- Just Juliette
- Just a Minute
- Just Perfick Shoes

== K ==
- Kaleidoscope
- The Ken Dodd Show
- Ken Dodd's Palace of Laughter
- King of Bath
- King of the Road
- King Street Junior
- King Stupid
- Knowing Me Knowing You with Alan Partridge

== L ==
- Last Word
- Late
- Late Junction
- Lee and Herring
- Legal, Decent, Honest and Truthful
- Lent Talks
- Letter from America
- A Life of Bliss
- Life, Death and Sex with Mike and Sue
- Life with Dexter
- Life With The Lyons
- Like They've Never Been Gone
- Linda Smith's A Brief History of Timewasting
- Lines From My Grandfather's Forehead
- Lionel Nimrod's Inexplicable World
- Listen with Mother
- The Little Big Woman Radio Show
- Little Britain
- Living with Betty
- The Living World
- A Look Back at the Nineties
- Loose Ends
- Lord Peter Wimsey
- Losers
- Love 40: New Balls Please
- Lucky Heather

== M ==
- MacFlintock's Palace
- Mammon
- Many a Slip
- Man of Soup
- The Mark Steel Lectures
- The Mark Steel Solution
- Mars Project
- The Mausoleum Club
- The Men from the Ministry
- Midweek
- Midweek Theatre
- The Milligan Papers
- The Million Pound Radio Show
- Millport
- Mitch Benn's Crimes Against Music
- The Mitch Benn Music Show
- Molesworth
- Money Box
- Moon Over Morocco
- The Moral Maze
- The Motorway Men
- The Museum of Everything
- My Muse
- Music While You Work
- My Uncle Freddie
- My Word!
- The Metal Hall

== N ==
- The Nallon Tapes
- The Name's the Game
- Nature
- The Navy Lark
- The Network Chart Show
- The Newly Discovered Casebook of Sherlock Holmes
- Newsbeat
- Newsday
- Newshour
- Newsjack
- The News Huddlines
- The News Quiz
- Nicholas Nickleby
- Nightcap
- Night Waves
- The Nimmo Twins
- Nineteen Ninety-Four
- Nineteen Ninety-Eight
- No Commitments
- Not in Front of the Children
- Nothing's Gonna Change My World
- The Now Show

== O ==
- Old Harry's Game
- Omar Khayyam
- On the Hour
- On the Job
- On the Town with The League of Gentlemen
- One
- One Lump or Two?
- Oobo Joobu
- Open Book
- Opera on 3
- Orbit One Zero
- Orbiter X
- The O'Show
- Outlook
- Overland Patrol

== P ==
- The Party Party
- The Patrick and Maureen Maybe Music Experience
- Paul Temple
- People Like Us
- Peter Dickson Presents Nightcap
- Pick of the Pops
- PM
- Poetry Please
- Pop Go the Beatles
- The Press Gang
- The Price of Fear
- Probe
- Pull the Other One!
- Puzzle Panel

== Q ==
- Quando, Quando, Quando
- The Quatermass Memoirs
- Quote... Unquote

== R ==
- RadioTalk from The Radio Academy
- Radio Active
- Radio Newsreel
- Radio Shuttleworth
- The Random Jottings of Hinge and Bracket
- Ray's a Laugh
- The Remains of Foley and McColl
- Revolting People
- The Right Time
- Ringo's Yellow Submarine
- Rolling Home
- Round Britain Quiz
- Round the Horne
- The Routes of English
- Routemasters
- Rumpole of the Bailey
- The Russ Abbot Show

== S ==
- Saturday Club
- Saturday Live
- Saturday Night Fry
- Saturday Night Theatre
- Saturday Review
- Science in Action
- Sean Lock: 15 Storeys High
- Sexton Blake
- Shipping Forecast
- Sloe Coaches
- The Small World of Dominic Holland
- Smelling of Roses
- The Sofa of Time
- Some of Our Pilots are Missing
- Son of Cliché
- Sorry About Last Night
- Sounding Brass
- Special Courier
- Sport on Four
- Sports Report
- Sportsworld
- Stand Up to Screen
- Start the Week
- Steptoe and Son
- Steven Appleby's Normal Life
- Stockport... So Good They Named It Once
- Stop Messing About
- Stop the Week
- The Strand
- Streetsounds
- Stumped
- The Sunday Play
- Sunny Side Up

== T ==
- Take It From Here
- Take Me to Your Reader
- Tales from the Backbench
- Tales from the Mausoleum Club
- Test Match Special
- Thanks a Lot, Milton Jones!
- That Mocking Bird
- That Reminds Me
- Think the Unthinkable
- This Is Craig Brown
- This Sceptred Isle: The 20th Century
- This Sceptred Isle: The Dynasties
- Tickling the Ivories
- Today
- Top of the Form
- Trivia Test Match
- The Truck
- True Stories from Britain
- Two Doors Down
- Two Priests and a Nun Go into a Pub...

== U ==
- UK Music Week
- UK Radio
- The Unbelievable Truth
- Underneath the Arches
- Unnatural Acts
- Up to the Hour

== V ==
- Variety Bandbox
- Variety Playhouse
- The Very World of Milton Jones
- Voyage

== W ==
- Waggoners' Walk
- Waiting Gate
- The Way It Is
- Weak at the Top
- Week Ending
- Week in Westminster
- The Weekend Starts Here
- Westminster Hour
- Westway
- What the Papers Say
- Whatever Happened to ...?
- White Nights
- Whose Line Is It Anyway?
- Wild Justice
- Wise on the Wireless
- Woman's Hour
- Word of Mouth
- The Wordsmiths of Gorsemere
- Workers' Playtime
- The World as We Know It
- The World at One
- The World This Weekend
- The World Today
- The World Tonight
- World Have Your Say
- World of Pub
- World Update
- The Write Stuff

== X ==
- X Marks the Spot

== Y ==
- Yes Sir, I Can Boogie
- You Start, I'll Join In
- You and Yours
- Young Pioneers

== See also ==
- List of Canadian radio programs
- List of US radio programs
