= Hamish and Dougal =

Radio characters

Hamish and Dougal You'll Have Had Your Tea
- Genre: Situation comedy
- Running time: 15 minutes
- Country of origin: United Kingdom
- Language(s): English
- Home station: BBC Radio 4
- Starring: Barry Cryer; Graeme Garden; Alison Steadman; Jeremy Hardy
- Created by: Barry Cryer; Graeme Garden
- Written by: Barry Cryer; Graeme Garden
- Produced by: Jon Naismith
- Original release: 24 December 2002 – 25 January 2007
- No. of series: 3
- No. of episodes: 18
- Audio format: Stereophonic sound
- Opening theme: Horn Concerto No. 4 by Wolfgang Amadeus Mozart, arranged and played as a Scottish Jig.
- Website: BBC website

Hamish and Dougal are two characters from the long-running BBC Radio 4 radio comedy panel game I'm Sorry I Haven't a Clue, played by Barry Cryer and Graeme Garden, who later went on to have their own Radio 4 series, You'll Have Had Your Tea: The Doings of Hamish and Dougal. The series is occasionally broadcast on the BBC's repeat station, Radio 4 Extra.

== History ==
The fictional characters Hamish and Dougal originated in one of the rounds of I'm Sorry I Haven't a Clue called Sound Charades. In this round the title of a book or film has to be conveyed from one team to the other by means of a story; the result of the story is usually a pun on the title in question. The panellists Cryer and Garden often tell their story as Hamish and Dougal, who are two elderly Scottish gentlemen. One of the characters was originally called Angus. The duo continued with the characters, according to Garden "mainly because (fellow panellist) Tim Brooke-Taylor hated them". Garden refers to a cousin Hamish during an episode of the Goodies in 1975. A prototype Hamish and Dougal first appeared in a 1979 Christmas Special of 'Clue', doing 'Wee Freak Ings Of Orient Are', with John Junkin standing in for Barry Cryer. However, the characters didn't appear fully formed until the 1995 Christmas Special, when the duo gave the clue for 'The Queen's Peach'. Hamish and Dougal then became the focus of a spin-off show called You'll Have Had Your Tea: The Doings of Hamish and Dougal, abbreviated to Hamish and Dougal on the packaging of the official CD releases.

The spin-off show was named in reference to the fact that the characters' sketches on I'm Sorry I Haven't a Clue began with a variant of the line "You'll have had your tea then, Hamish". This refers to an idiom used in Edinburgh, where a visitor who has dropped in at "tea" (a colloquial term for an evening meal) is informed that the host does not intend to feed them. The stereotype of Scottish people being careful with their money is regularly played on in the series.

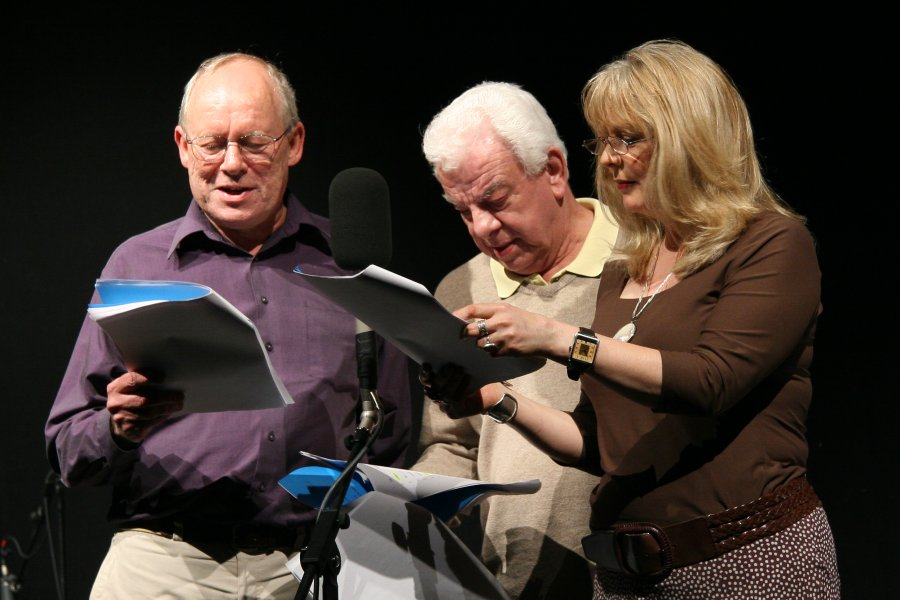
Garden, Cryer and Steadman during a recording of the programme in 2006.

Episodes were 15 minutes long and were extensions of the one-minute sketches. The series featured two other actors: regular I'm Sorry I Haven't a Clue panelist Jeremy Hardy, and Alison Steadman. Steadman played Mrs Naughtie the housekeeper, while Hardy played the local laird. The announcer was BBC newsreader Brian Perkins. The music for the series was arranged by Graeme's son Jon Garden and performed by a four-piece ceilidh band. The programmes were produced by Jon Naismith. Other actors have also featured in guest appearances, such as the 2004 Hogmanay special which featured guest appearances from I'm Sorry I Haven't a Clue chairman Humphrey Lyttelton, as the Laird's butler Lyttelton, Today programme presenter Jim Naughtie (as Mrs Naughtie's long-lost son), Sandi Toksvig (as Sandi Wedge, a very tall golf champion) and Tim Brooke-Taylor and Colin Sell (as themselves).

The show relied heavily on sexual innuendo, and Scottish stereotypes. Long-running jokes from the parent series were frequently referred to, such as the quality of Hardy's singing voice, which is occasionally excruciatingly demonstrated in the series, it is thought that Hardy's character The Laird's favorite band is Atomic Kitten having sung "Eternal Flame" In Series 1 Episode 1 - The Musical Evening and "The Tide Is High" in Series 1 Episode 4 - The Shooting Party.

Fictitious place-names used within the series include Ben Kingsley, Loch Krankie, and Glen Close.

A book of the complete scripts from all three series plus the Hogmanay and Burns Night specials was published in hardback by Preface Publishing on 28 August 2008 entitled The Doings of Hamish and Dougal: You'll Have Had Your Tea?. The book also includes comedy cooking recipes created by Garden and poems.

== Critical reception ==
The series has been described as "reality-based comedy at its finest" by The Times, and as "basically The Beano with added smut" by The Independent. Gavin Docherty of the Daily Express said, after reading the book of scripts, "I laughed so hard my head nearly fell off".

The Scotsman gave the series a negative review, with Robert McNeil describing the series as one with "ridiculous Scottish voices" and "quasi-racist routines". Cryer denied that the show is anti-Scottish saying the series was "an affectionate laugh at all things Scottish. Graeme is half Scottish. I am borderline, having been born in Cumbria" (although reference sources generally state that he came from Yorkshire). Garden stated that in the series they were sending up the stereotypes of Scots rather than Scots themselves.

== Episode list ==
Series	Episode	Title	First broadcast
1	1	The Musical Evening	24 December 2002
1	2	The Murder Mystery	25 December 2002
1	3	Romance in the Glen	26 December 2002
1	4	The Shooting Party	27 December 2002
2	1	The Vampire of the Glen	25 February 2004
2	2	Fame Idol	3 March 2004
2	3	The Fitness Club	10 March 2004
2	4	The Poison Pen Letters	17 March 2004
2	5	The Monster in the Loch	24 March 2004
2	6	Trapped!	31 March 2004
Special	1	Hogmanay special	31 December 2004
3	1	Gambling Fever	24 August 2006
3	2	There's Something about Mrs Naughtie	31 August 2006
3	3	The Subsidence Adventure	7 September 2006
3	4	Inverurie Jones and the Thimble of Doom	14 September 2006
3	5	Look Who's Stalking	21 September 2006
3	6	Porridge Votes	28 September 2006
Special	2	Burns Night special	25 January 2007
