= Douglas Adams's Guide to The Hitchhiker's Guide to the Galaxy =

Douglas Adams's Guide to The Hitch-Hiker's Guide to the Galaxy
- Box cover of Douglas Adams's Guide to The Hitch-Hiker's Guide to the Galaxy
- Author: Douglas Adams and Debbie Barham
- Language: English
- Series: The Hitchhiker's Guide to the Galaxy documentary
- Genre: Comedy, Science fiction
- Publisher: BBC
- Publication date: 1998
- Publication place: United Kingdom
- Media type: Audio cassette (two tapes)
- ISBN: 0-563-55236-0
- OCLC: 60404787

Douglas Adams's Guide to The Hitch-Hiker's Guide to the Galaxy is a BBC Radio production sold as an audio book on two cassette tapes (later, two CDs). The programme was partially broadcast by BBC Radio 4 as a 40-minute feature titled The Guide to 20 Years' Hitch-Hiking on 5 March 1998, marking the 20th anniversary of the first radio programme in the Hitchhiker's Guide to the Galaxy series.

== Tape one ==
The first tape runs 55 minutes and is narrated by Peter Jones, who narrated the original radio series. It features comments by many of the people involved, telling how the series was created and how it developed. The participants are Douglas Adams, Simon Brett (producer of the first programme), Simon Jones (Arthur Dent), Geoffrey McGivern (Ford Prefect), Paddy Kingsland (sound effects and audio mixing), Stephen Moore (Marvin), Geoffrey Perkins (producer of the first two radio series, except for the first programme) and Nick Webb (Pan Books).

These comments are intermixed with some clips from the radio programmes, including some highlights such as the destruction of the earth and Marvin telling everyone how depressed he is.

The programme was written by Debbie Barham.

== Tape two ==
The second tape runs 50 minutes and consists of Douglas Adams being interviewed by Iain Johnstone. Many topics are touched upon, often with surprising connections between them.

Some of the topics discussed by Douglas Adams are: University of Cambridge and Footlights, Monty Python, Graham Chapman, Star Wars, Tolstoy's Resurrection, Last Chance to See, the Nordic god Thor, is Arthur Dent really Douglas Adams, Simon Jones, light switches, Richard Dawkins, atheism, Procol Harum, Doom Watch, X-Files, Sherlock Holmes, Arthur C. Clarke, The Digital Village, John Cleese's influence in selecting "42", the Hubble Constant, and his daughter Polly.

== Availability ==
The product is no longer available at BBC Shop, but can usually be found on Internet auction sites and used book sites and Internet book stores that sell used books via "partners". It is available as a bonus on the CD boxset of the first two series: Hitchhiker's Guide To The Galaxy: Collector's Edition ISBN 978-0-563-47702-0.
