= Laurie Rowley =

Laurie Rowley may refer to:

- Laurie Rowley (writer) (1941–2009), English comedy writer
- Laurie Rowley (tennis) (born 1955), American tennis player
