= Sounding brass =

Sounding Brass or sounding brass can refer to:

- Sounding Brass (radio show), a pioneer phone-in programme on BBC Radio 2 in which a live brass band played listeners' requests
- Sounding Brass (TV series), a 1980 ITV comedy series about a brass band
- Sounding Brass, a song about status and its symbols by Flanders and Swann
- Sounding brass, one of the various translations (another being loud gong for example) of 1 Corinthians 13:1. Some believe this to refer to a kind of Roman-era audio amplifier, remains of which have been found in amphitheatres.
