= Jon Naismith =

British radio producer (born 1965)

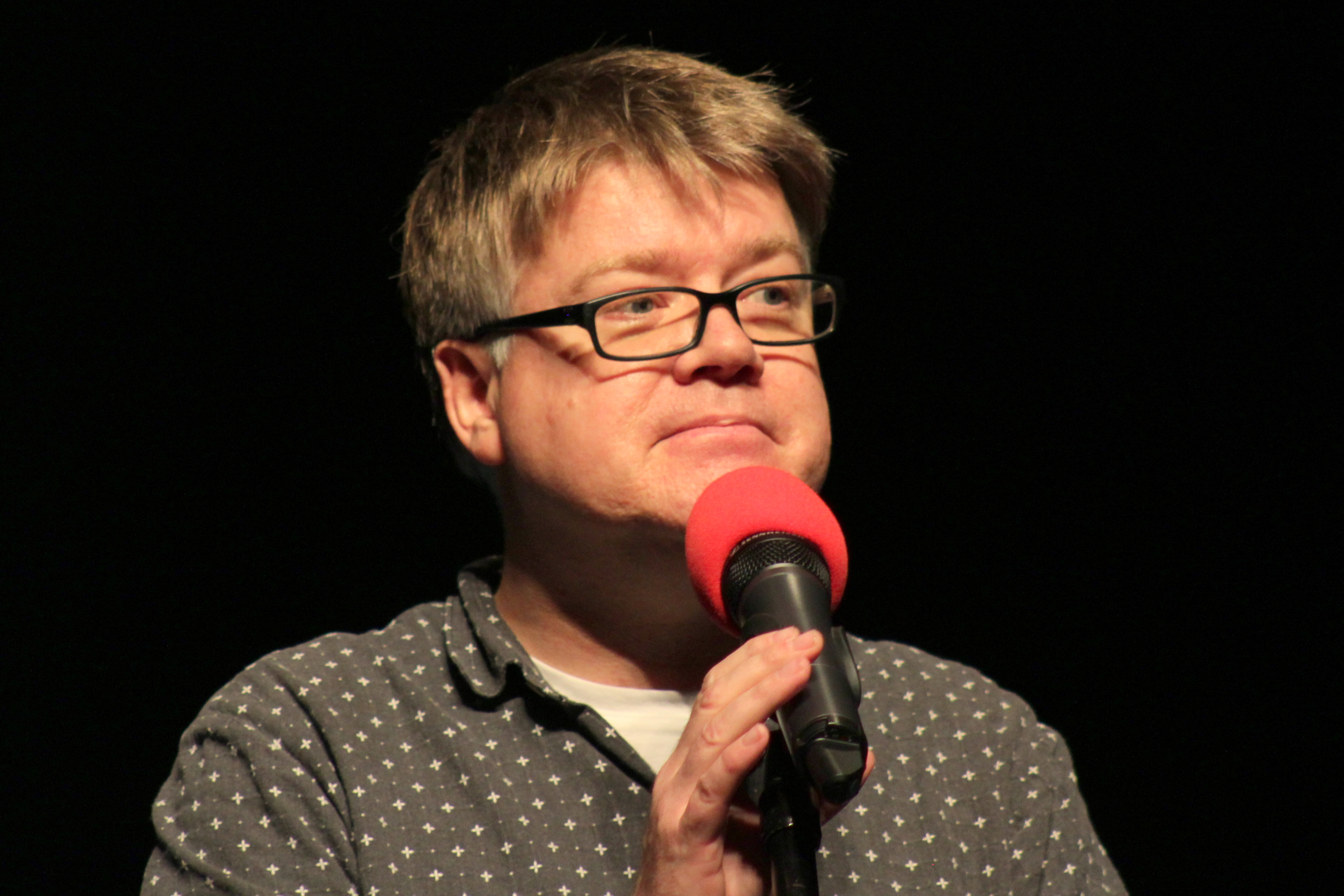
- Naismith in 2014
- Born: Jonathan W D Naismith; 1965 (age 60–61); Westminster, England
- Occupation: Producer
- Years active: 1991–present

Jon Naismith (born 1965) is a producer mainly known for his work on BBC Radio, primarily comedy, including You'll Have Had Your Tea, The Unbelievable Truth and About a Dog.

Since 1991 he has been the producer of I'm Sorry I Haven't a Clue.

== Early life ==
Jon Naismith attended Horris Hill School in Hampshire from 1973 to 1978.

Naismith was a member of Footlights at the University of Cambridge and Junior Treasurer from 1987–1988. He co-wrote and starred in the 1988 revue Sheep Go Bare alongside Mel Giedroyc, Simon Munnery, Tom Hollander, Dan Gooch and Sarah Dudman.

== Work ==
Naismith has been producer of the long-running radio panel show I'm Sorry I Haven't a Clue since 1991. The episodes are recorded before a live theatre audience, with two programmes being recorded at each performance and Naismith traditionally performs the duties of "warmup artist". This usually involves testing sound recording levels by means of a "patronising audience participation exercise" and a joke. Naismith also provides the voiceovers for the show, such as when the host talks about something appearing on the "laser display board" (actually Naismith displaying a large card to the audience), he is "the mystery voice for listeners at home".

== Books ==
- The Little Book of Mornington Crescent. 2000. ISBN 978-0-7528-1864-1
- with Graeme Garden and Barry Cryer: Hamish and Dougal: You'll Have Had Your Tea?. 2005. ISBN 978-0-00-721051-0
- Uxbridge English Dictionary (I'm Sorry I Haven't a Clue). 2005. ISBN 978-0-00-720337-6
