= About a Dog =

- Genre: Comedy
- Running time: 30 min
- Country of origin: United Kingdom
- Language: English language
- Home station: BBC Radio 4
- Starring: Alan Davies
- Created by: Debbie Barham
- Written by: Graeme Garden
- Produced by: Jon Naismith
- Original release: 6 October 2004 – 14 August 2007
- No. of series: 2
- No. of episodes: 9

About a Dog is Debbie Barham's last comedy proposal before she died in 2003. The programme stars Alan Davies, playing a dog, Jack, with his owner, Sarah, played by Kate Ashfield in the first series and Claire Goose in the second, in a sitcom told through the eyes of a canine.

Developed by Above the Title Productions and subsequently scripted by Graeme Garden from Barham's notes, this comedy explores the unique relationship between dogs and their owners and asks if your 'best friend' has some essential 'doggy wisdom' to offer you.

The programmes were produced by Jon Naismith. Garden wrote a second series of the show that was broadcast in 2007.

== Episode list ==
Series 1

- Episode 1: 'Let Sleeping Dogs Lie' (6 October 2004)
- Episode 2: 'We Was Robbed!' (13 October 2004)
- Episode 3: 'Love, Probably' (20 October 2004)

Series 2

- Episode 1: 'A Munch in the Country' (10 July 2007)
- Episode 2: 'A Tail of Love' (17 July 2007)
- Episode 3: 'Mistress and Commander' (24 July 2007)
- Episode 4: 'Bitchcraft' (31 July 2007)
- Episode 5: 'Every Dog Has His Day' (7 August 2007)
- Episode 6: 'Collars and Cuffs' (14 August 2007)
