= Leila Sansour =

Palestinian film director

- ليلى صنصور
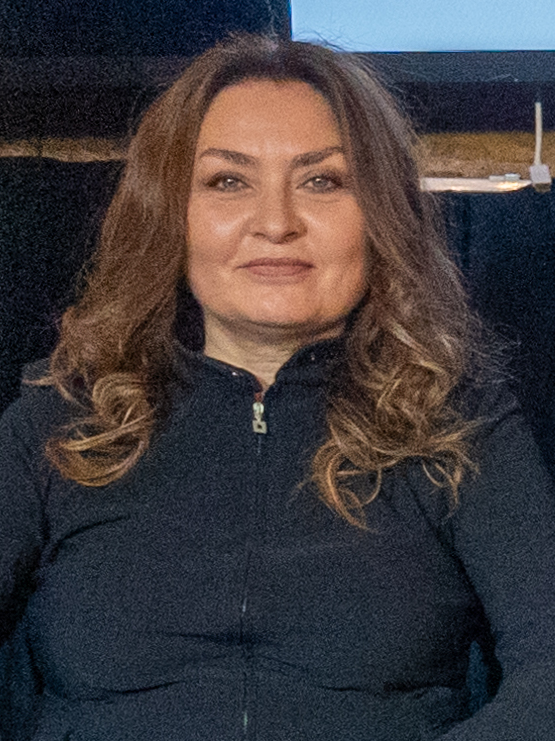
- Sansour at the 2024 Chiswick Book Festival
- Born: 16 February 1966 (age 59); Moscow, Russian SFSR, Soviet Union
- Education: Sorbonne University, Moscow State University, University of Warwick
- Occupation(s): Film director, film producer
- Years active: 2003–present
- Known for: Founder, CEO of Open Bethlehem
- Spouse: Nicholas Blincoe
- Website: www.openbethlehem.org

Leila Sansour (Arabic: ليلى صنصور; Russian: Лейла Сансур), is a Russian-born Palestinian film director and film producer. She is the founder and chief executive officer of Open Bethlehem, a non-governmental foundation established to promote and protect the life and heritage of the city of Bethlehem. Sansour developed the Bethlehem Passport in partnership with the city council and governor of Bethlehem. Pope Benedict XVI became the first recipient of the Bethlehem passport when he accepted the citizenship of Bethlehem from Palestinian president Mahmoud Abbas in December 2005.

== Early life and education ==
Leila Sansour was born in Moscow on 16 February 1966, to a Palestinian father and a Russian mother. Sansour is from an old Palestinian Roman Catholic family. Her father Anton was teaching mathematics at Moscow State University. Sansour and her family moved to Bethlehem in 1972. Her father became one of the founders of the Bethlehem University, previously a Catholic seminary.

Sansour studied at the Sorbonne, Moscow State University and the University of Warwick.

== Career ==
Sansour is a film director who produced the film Jeremy Hardy vs. the Israeli Army [2003], following the British comedian Jeremy Hardy and his travails during the siege of Bethlehem in 2002. She began her film work in television and produced the series Cultural Portraits for Al Jazeera, featuring profiles of prominent Arabs who had made a significant world contribution in the arts, science or politics.

Her most recent work is the film and awareness campaign Open Bethlehem. The film screened in festivals in the U.K., and toured Canada in September 2016, screening in Montreal, Vancouver, Toronto, and Edmonton. Open Bethlehem is an international campaign that works to promote global engagement with Bethlehem as a real and contemporary city in the Middle East. It does so by supporting the distribution of communication tools about Bethlehem to boost international interest and awareness and by promoting visits to Bethlehem through established and specialized tour operators. The campaign also works to develop a network of passionate ambassadors for the city through the Bethlehem Passport Program.

== Personal life ==
Sansour married the English writer Nicholas Blincoe, having met while studying at Warwick. The couple reside in London.
