= Jack and Jeremy's Real Lives =

- Starring: Jack Dee; Jeremy Hardy
- No. of episodes: 6

Production
- Running time: 35 mins

Original release
- Network: Channel 4
- Release: 31 May – 6 July 1996

Jack and Jeremy's Real Lives is a 1996 comedy show for Channel 4, written by and starring Jack Dee and Jeremy Hardy.

The series was a collection of mockumentaries similar to their previous collaboration, Jack and Jeremy's Police 4. Each episode focused on the pair playing bizarre characters from a particular profession. The series was shot on film and featured no laugh track. The pilot featured Sacha Baron Cohen being electrocuted.

After three episodes it was moved to air after midnight due to low ratings.

== Episodes and summaries ==
=== Aristocrats ===
A day in the life of aristocratic brothers has them solving a murder, attending a black magic ritual and visiting some poor people.

=== Writers ===
Struggling, troubled writers believe they've received their big break when Radio 3 ask them to do a poetry reading.

=== Paranormal Researchers ===
The pair search for evidence of ghosts in Barbara Castle, Dorset.

=== Restaurateurs ===
A fly-on-the-wall account of the working lives of Antoine-Antoine and Vincenzo Jean-Claude Arkwright, who run a top celebrity restaurant, Gliterati's

=== Consumer Watchdogs ===
The pair investigate fake newsagents, pension advice and pursue the manager of ageing boyband X-Citing.

=== Hospital Entrepreneurs ===
The pair attempt to run a profit-making hospital.
