= Kit Hollerbach =

American comedian

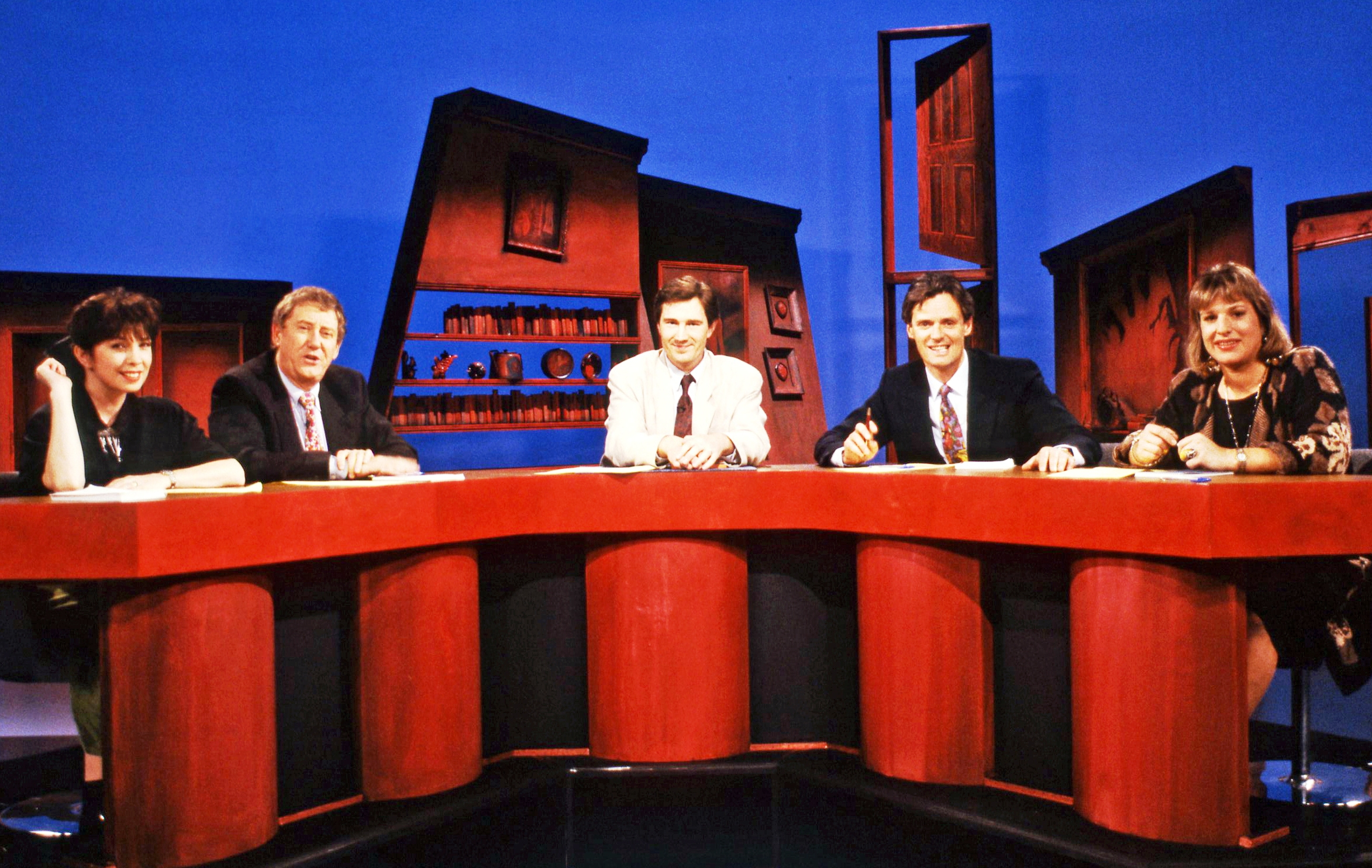
Don't Quote Me, from the left, Kit Hollerbach, Austin Mitchell, Chairman Geoffrey Perkins, Simon Williams, and Carol Thatcher, Channel 4 1990

Kathleen Ann Hollerbach is an American stand-up comedian and actress. She was born in Sacramento, California.

In 1985, Hollerbach was a founding member of The Comedy Store Players. In the 1989 Tim Burton film Batman Hollerbach played Becky Narita, the TV news anchor poisoned on air by The Joker using poisoned makeup products.

Hollerbach co-wrote and performed in the BBC radio sitcoms Unnatural Acts and At Home with the Hardys.

== Personal life ==
Hollerbach was married to British comedian Jeremy Hardy from 1986 until 2006. They adopted a daughter in 1990. She became a teacher in 1996.
