= Jeremy Hardy Speaks to the Nation =

- Genre: Stand Up Comedy
- Running time: 30 minutes
- Country of origin: United Kingdom
- Language: English
- Home station: BBC Radio 4
- Starring: Jeremy Hardy; Gordon Kennedy; Debbie Isitt
- Produced by: David Tyler
- Original release: 30 September 1993 – 8 October 2014
- No. of series: 10
- No. of episodes: 48 + 1 special
- Website: BBC Website

Jeremy Hardy Speaks to the Nation is a BBC Radio 4 series of comedy lectures hosted by Jeremy Hardy, first broadcast in September 1993. The tenth and final series aired in 2014.

The lectures were on topics like "How to have a baby", "How to be truly loved", and often included Hardy's personal views on current affairs.

There were a series of sketches and mock interviews carried out with his two guests. Gordon Kennedy and Debbie Isitt were the two main guests, while other guests included Meera Syal, Rebecca Front, Alison Steadman, Stephen Frost, Miranda Richardson and Harriet Walter.

After Hardy's death on 1 February 2019, a final miniseries of two episodes entitled in past tense, When Jeremy Hardy Spoke To The Nation, aired on 16 & 23 May 2019 on Radio 4, with Sandi Toksvig narrating and David Tyler producing a retrospective of Hardy's life through clips of the series, some previously unheard to the public, along with other programmes Hardy participated in.

== Episode guide ==
Series	Episode	Title	First broadcast	Guests
1	1	How to Stay Alive for as Long as You Possibly Can	30 Sep 1993	Debbie Isitt, Stephen Frost
1	2	How to Be Truly Free	7 Oct 1993	Debbie Isitt, Stephen Frost
1	3	How to Earn Your Place in Heaven	14 Oct 1993	Debbie Isitt, Stephen Frost
1	4	How to Be an Adult	21 Oct 1993	Debbie Isitt, Stephen Frost
1	5	How to Have Sex	28 Oct 1993	Debbie Isitt, Stephen Frost
1	6	How to Know Your Place	4 Nov 1993	Debbie Isitt, Stephen Frost
2	1	How to Be a Popular Figure Around Town	6 Oct 1994	Debbie Isitt, Gordon Kennedy
2	2	How to Have a Baby	13 Oct 1994	Debbie Isitt, Gordon Kennedy
2	3	How to Be a Leader of Men	20 Oct 1994	Debbie Isitt, Gordon Kennedy
2	4	How to Be a Father (1)	27 Oct 1994	Debbie Isitt, Gordon Kennedy, Ben Keaton
2	5	How to Be a Father (2)	3 Nov 1994	Debbie Isitt, Gordon Kennedy
2	6	How to Meet the Challenge of the 21st Century	10 Nov 1994	Debbie Isitt, Gordon Kennedy
3	1	How to Be a Man	6 Feb 1997	Debbie Isitt, Gordon Kennedy
3	2	How to Bear Up Under the Strain	13 Feb 1997	Meera Syal, Gordon Kennedy
3	3	How to Make Your Presence Felt	20 Feb 1997	Meera Syal, Gordon Kennedy
3	4	How to Improve Your Mind	27 Feb 1997	Meera Syal, Gordon Kennedy
3	5	How to Keep Abreast of Developments	6 Mar 1997	Debbie Isitt, Gordon Kennedy
3	6	How to Be Happy	13 Mar 1997	Caroline Leddy, Gordon Kennedy
4	1	How to Fight Fire with Fire	6 Sep 2001	Debbie Isitt, Gordon Kennedy
4	2	How to Live	20 Sep 2001	Debbie Isitt, Gordon Kennedy
4	3	How to Work	27 Sep 2001	Debbie Isitt, Gordon Kennedy
4	4	How to See Through Others' Eyes	4 Oct 2001	Debbie Isitt, Gordon Kennedy
4	5	How to Hand the World on to the Next Generation	11 Oct 2001	Debbie Isitt, Gordon Kennedy
4	6	When Jeremy Hardy Spoke to the Nation	18 Oct 2001	Graeme Garden, Debbie Isitt
5	1	How to Be Yourself	8 Jan 2003	Debbie Isitt, Gordon Kennedy
5	2	How to Belong	15 Jan 2003	Debbie Isitt, Gordon Kennedy
5	3	How to Maximise Your Leisure	22 Jan 2003	Debbie Isitt, Gordon Kennedy
5	4	How to Be Young	29 Jan 2003	Debbie Isitt, Gordon Kennedy
6	1	How to Be Afraid	9 Sep 2004	Rebecca Front, Gordon Kennedy
6	2	How to Argue Your Position	16 Sep 2004	Gordon Kennedy, Alison Steadman
6	3	How to Choose	23 Sep 2004	Gordon Kennedy, Pauline McLynn
6	4	How to Live Life to the Full	30 Sep 2004	Juliet Stevenson, Gordon Kennedy
Special	-	Jeremy Hardy's New Year Cavalcade	31 Dec 2004	Jack Dee, Armando Iannucci, John Oliver
7	1	How to Feel	3 Apr 2007	Gordon Kennedy, Miranda Richardson
7	2	How to Believe	10 Apr 2007	Alison Steadman, Ewan Bailey
7	3	How to Die	17 Apr 2007	Pauline McLynn, Paul B Davies
7	4	How to Look	24 Apr 2007	Juliet Stevenson, Paul B Davies
8	1	How to Grow Up	30 Jun 2010	Gordon Kennedy, Rebecca Front
8	2	How To Confront The Vexed Issue Of British Identity Without Getting In The Most Fearful Bate About The Whole Thing	7 Jul 2010	Gordon Kennedy, Shappi Khorsandi
8	3	How to Have Faith	14 Jul 2010	Paul B Davies, Pauline McLynn
8	4	How to Communicate Without Showing Off	21 Jul 2010	Paul B Davies, Morwenna Banks
9	1	How to Exercise Power	28 Feb 2013	Gordon Kennedy, Katy Brand
9	2	How To Be a Woman in the 21st Century	7 Mar 2013	Gordon Kennedy, Sara Pascoe
9	3	How To Be a Man in the 21st Century	14 Mar 2013	Paul Bassett Davies, Sue Perkins
9	4	How to Speak	21 Mar 2013	Pauline McLynn, Paul B Davies
10	1	How to Eat Food	17 Sept 2014	Paul Bassett Davies, Vicki Pepperdine
10	2	How to Define Oneself in Terms of Regional, Cultural and Geopolitical Identity Without Tears	24 Sept 2014	Susan Murray, Moray Hunter
10	3	How to Be a Good Citizen	01 Oct 2014	Gordon Kennedy and Carla Mendonça
10	4	How To Be Better Theologically, Socially, Nationally and in Terms of One's Own Personal Development, Responsibility and Interaction with the Fellow Humans with Whom we Share this Fragile Planet, and Ting	08 Oct 2014	Paul Bassett Davies and Carla Mendonça

== Audio Books ==
Jeremy Hardy Speaks to the Nation currently has four audio books on sale.

- How To Be Happy and other shows - Released on 19 July 2004.
- How To Be Young and other shows - Released on 19 July 2004.
- How To Be Afraid and other shows - Released on 15 November 2004.
- How To Live and other shows - Released on 15 November 2004.

In addition the first series was adapted as a book, ISBN 0-413-69250-7, published by Methuen in 1993.

== Awards ==
The show was nominated in 2004 for the Sony Comedy award.
