= Dan Antopolski =

British comic, actor and writer

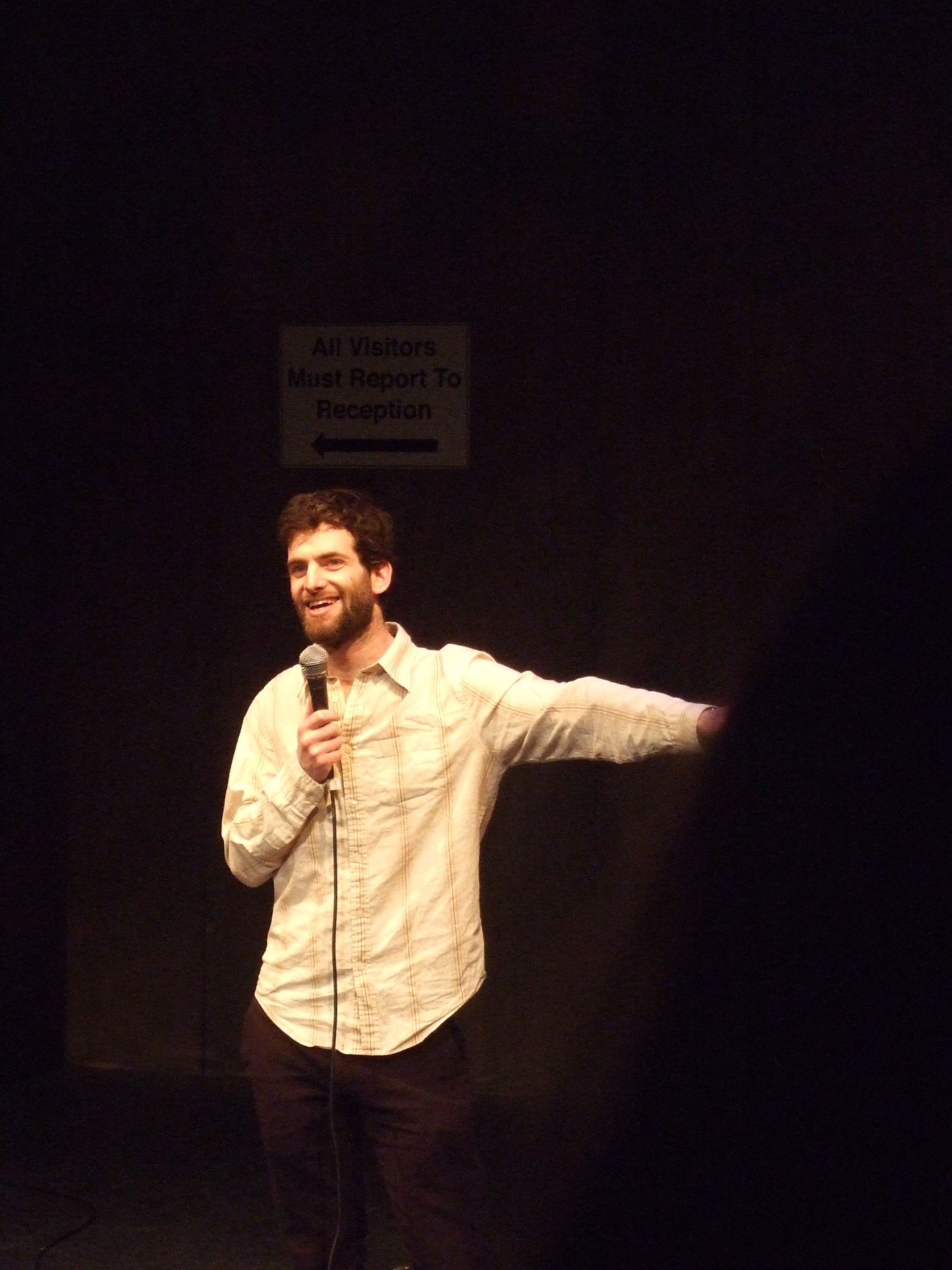
- Dan Antopolski, 2008
- Born: 22 August 1972 (age 54)

Comedy career
- Genres: Observational comedy, Alternative comedy
- Website: http://www.danantopolski.com

Dan Antopolski (born 22 August 1972) is a British comic, actor and writer. He has appeared in various television programs and radio shows, and is best known to younger audiences for hosting the UK game show The Dare Devil. In 1998 Antopolski won the BBC New Comedy Award and in 2009 he won the Dave Award for Best Joke at the 2009 Edinburgh Festival Fringe. He has appeared at international comedy festivals in Montreal, Melbourne and New York. Antopolski has been a regular performer at the Edinburgh Festival Fringe, had minor roles in films and appeared in a number of panel shows.

== Style ==
Antopolski's comedy style has been described as surreal and ironic. He was described in a 2008 review as "a natural heir to Bill Bailey".

== Awards ==
In 1998 Antopolski won the BBC New Comedy Award and in 2009 won Joke Of The Year at the 2009 Edinburgh Festival Fringe. The joke, "Hedgehogs – why can't they just share the hedge?", went viral and Antopolski's agents had to issue a cease and desist order to a T-shirt company reproducing the joke. He was nominated for the "Perrier Best Newcomer Award" at the Edinburgh Festival in 2000 and shared a nomination for "Best Show" with Lee Mack and Catherine Tate in the same year. In 2001 his Antopolski 2000 performance was also nominated for "Best Show".

== Performances ==
=== Live shows ===
- Return of the Dan Antopolski, Edinburgh Festival, 2017.
- Jiggle It – Jigsaw, Edinburgh Festival, 2013. Sketch show with Tom Craine and Nat Luurtsema
- Gettin' Jiggy – Jigsaw, Edinburgh Festival, 2012. Sketch show with Tom Craine and Nat Luurtsema
- Jigsaw, Edinburgh Festival, 2011. Sketch show with Tom Craine and Nat Luurtsema
- Turn of the Century, Edinburgh Festival, 2010.
- Silent But Deadly, Edinburgh Festival, 2009.
- Dan Antopolski's Penetrating Gaze, Edinburgh Festival, 2008.
- A Whim Away, Edinburgh Festival, 2004.
- The Dinks 2: Mouthbreathin', Edinburgh Festival, 2004. Stand-Up with Craig Campbell and Tony Law.
- The Dinks, Edinburgh Festival, 2003. Stand-Up with Craig Campbell and Tony Law.
- The Presence, Edinburgh Festival, 2002.
- Antopolski 2000, Edinburgh Festival, 2001.
- Lee Mack's New Bits, Edinburgh Festival, 2000. Sketch show with Lee Mack and Catherine Tate.
- Second Coming, Edinburgh Festival, 2000.
- Lee Mack's Bits, Edinburgh Festival, 1999. Sketch show with Lee Mack and Catherine Tate.

=== Television ===
- Good Omens (2019) (John Device)
- The Dog Ate My Homework (CBBC) (2014; 2016)
- The Dare Devil (CBBC) (2013–15)
- Hacker Time (as Dr Side-Parting) (CBBC) (2013)
- Live at the Electric (as Jigsaw) (BBC) (2012)
- Moonmonkeys (BBC3 Special also featuring Karl Theobald) (2007)
- Hyperdrive 'Jeffers' in two seasons of the BBC2 science fiction comedy 2006–2007
- The Stand-Up Show (BBC) (3 series)
- Time Gentlemen Please (Sky)
- Live Floor Show (BBC) (2 series)
- The World Comedy Tour (Comedy Central/Paramount/Channel 9) (2002)
- Edinburgh and Beyond (Paramount) (2004)
- Head Farm (Channel 4 Pilot, also featuring Johnny Vegas, The Mighty Boosh, Garth Marenghi) (2002)

=== Radio ===
- Jigsaw (12 episodes Series 1 and 2) (Radio 4) (2014)
- Sketchorama (as Jigsaw) (Radio 4)
- One (Series 1 – 3) (Radio 4) (2006–2010)
- This Is My Mark (Radio 4) (2009)
- Out to Lunch (Radio 2) (28 episodes 2006 – 2008)
- Peacefully in Their Sleeps (Radio 4) (with Howard Read) (2007)
- The Dan Antopolski Radio Show (Radio 2) (Half-hour special broadcast 14 June 2007)
- Moonmonkeys (Resonance FM) (6 part weekly series with Karl Theobald) (2007)
- Exterminating Angels (Radio 4) (4 episodes, co-starring with Karl Theobald) (2006)
- The Milk Run (Radio 1) regular contributor and starred in The Dinks special edition (2005)
- Four at the Store (Radio 4) (2003)

=== Film ===
- Paddington 2 (2017) (St. Pauls Guard)
- It's All Gone Pete Tong (2004) (Eric Banning)
- Big Girl, Little Girl (2004) (Olly)
