= Ray Steadman-Allen =

British composer

Lieutenant Colonel (Dr.) Ray Steadman-Allen OF

Personal details
- Born: 18 September 1922
- Died: 15 December 2014 (aged 92)

Lieutenant Colonel (Dr) Ray Steadman-Allen (18 September 1922 – 15 December 2014) was a British composer of choral and brass band music for the Salvation Army and for band competition.

He was born in the Salvation Army 'Mother's Hospital', Clapton, while his Salvation Army Officer parents were living in the Horfield area of Bristol. When they were appointed to London in 1937, he obtained a job at International Headquarters as office boy to General Evangeline Booth, daughter of The Salvation Army's founder.

In 1942, he enlisted in the Royal Navy. He was examined for a music diploma by Sir Granville Bantock who invited him to apply for a job in music after the war. In the event, Bantock died, and Ray Steadman-Allen joined the Music Editorial Department of The Salvation Army. Following a short post-war period as a trombonist with The International Staff Band, he developed his conducting skills and became Bandmaster of the Tottenham Citadel Band.

He became a Salvation Army officer in 1949, in the Harrow Corps., and in 1951 he married Joyce Foster, who had become a Salvation Army officer from the Hastings Citadel in 1949.

Much of his music was ahead of its time, to the point that it was sometimes considered unacceptable to the listener. Lord of the Sea created a furore. His creativity was given totally to God and was instrumental in guiding Salvation Army music into uncharted territory, particularly when the International Music Editorial Department was under his leadership between 1967 and 1980.

Ray Steadman-Allen regularly took part as Bandmaster in the popular radio programme Sounding Brass which was presented by Gloria Hunniford and Owen Spencer-Thomas on Radio 2 and Radio London in the 1970s. He wrote a book called Colour and Texture in the Brass Band Score which was published by The Salvation Army. First published in 1980, this volume has been reprinted due to continued demand from composers, arrangers, and university music departments alike.

Besides well over 200 brass band works published by The Salvation Army, Ray Steadman-Allen wrote numerous choral works with a large number of compositions and arrangements in manuscript form, often completed for recordings or special concert presentations.

As well as completing his Doctorate in Music, Ray Steadman-Allen held several honorary fellowships, was the President of the National College of Music, Vice President of the National Association of Brass Band Conductors and patron of the London Musicological Research Society.

Steadman-Allen also encouraged new compositional talent, particularly brass band composers.

In his later years, Ray Steadman-Allen became affectionately known as 'RSA'.

In 2003, the Royal School of Church Music awarded him its ARSCM (Associate of the RSCM). In 2005, The Salvation Army admitted RSA to its highest honour, the Order of the Founder.

In 2012, a suite of articles about his life and works was published by Shield Books under the title of 'History, Harmony and Humanity'.

Ray Steadman-Allen died on 15 December 2014 at the age of 92.
