= One (radio series) =

Radio comedy series created by David Quantick

- Genre: Comedy
- Running time: 15 minutes
- Country of origin: United Kingdom
- Language(s): English
- Home station: BBC Radio 4
- Created by: David Quantick
- Written by: David Quantick, Kevin Cecil, Dan Maier and others
- Produced by: Jon Naismith
- Original release: 2006 – 2010
- No. of series: 3
- No. of episodes: 18
- Audio format: Stereophonic sound
- Opening theme: One is the Loneliest Number by Harry Nilsson

One is a radio comedy series created by David Quantick. It was broadcast on BBC Radio 4 and BBC Radio 4 Extra. Each episode lasts 15 minutes and consists of a series of vignettes, each of which features only a single voice.

== Subjects ==
The style and subject matter of the vignettes is varied, but some themes recur.

- Unusual messages recorded on answering machines.
- Readings of notes found in a guest book at a vacation home, featuring bizarre complaints.
- Audio guides to museums that have obscure or bizarre exhibits.
- Parodies of commentaries in the style of well-known personalities, sometimes read by the personalities themselves, such as Jeremy Clarkson reading "Top Dog", or bird expert Bill Oddie describing, in the style of a nature documentary, a typical encounter between Wile E. Coyote and the Road Runner.
- Recitations of ideas such as personal crises, bad moods, T-shirt slogans etc., in the style of the Shipping Forecast. For example:

"And now with the time approaching 5 pm,
It's time for the mid-life crisis forecast...
Forties; restless: three or four.
Marriage: stale; becoming suffocating.
Sportscar, jeans and t-shirt; westerly, five.
Waitress; blonde; 19 or 20.
Converse all stars; haircut; earring; children;
becoming embarrassed.
Tail between legs; atmosphere frosty;
Spare room: five or six."

== Performers ==
Performers include Graeme Garden, Dan Antopolski, Simon Greenall, Lizzie Roper, and Deborah Norton. Those appearing as themselves include Jeremy Clarkson and Bill Oddie.
