= Big Girl, Little Girl =

- Written by: Amelia Hann
- Directed by: Amelia Hann
- Starring: Dan Antopolski; Lorna Fitzgerald; Melanie Gutteridge; Donna McCabe; Molly McMorrow; Robert Reina
- Theme music composer: Ewan Pearson
- Country of origin: United Kingdom
- Original language: English

Production
- Producers: Christine Hartland, Natalie Richmond Elvy, Amelia Hann
- Cinematography: Nemone Mercer
- Editor: Simon Barker
- Running time: 9 minutes
- Production company: Loose Cannon Productions
- Budget: Self funding

Original release
- Release: 2004

Big Girl, Little Girl is a 2004 British short film directed by Amelia Hann.

== Synopsis ==
The film revolves around the seven-year-old character called Lucy, who is in love with her uncle. Lucy tries to compete with his girlfriend in order to gain his affection.

== Cast ==
- Molly McMorrow as Lucy.
- Dan Antopolski as Uncle Olly.
- Melanie Gutteridge as Clare.
- Robert Reina as Eric.
- Donna McCabe as Anne.
- Lorna Fitzgerald as Katie.

== Reception ==
The film was received by the public without much criticism.

== Awards ==
Big Girl, Little Girl was nominated for two awards, one of which it has one. It won 'Best Director' in the Strasbourg Film Festival (II) in 2004, but failed to win 'Best Short Film' in the San Francisco Short Film Festival in the same year.
