= Paul B. Davies =

British actor and writer

Paul Bassett Davies, also known as Paul Bassett, (Note: Both names are listed at IMDb. The Grass Roots movie biography for Paul makes it clear that they are one and the same.) is a British actor and writer.

== Career ==
Davies' writing credits include Spitting Image; Alas Smith and Jones; Rory Bremner; Jasper Carrot; Brogue Male; KYTV; Hello Mum; Up Your News; News Huddlines and At Home with the Hardys (with Jeremy Hardy).
