= Colin Sell =

British pianist (born 1948)

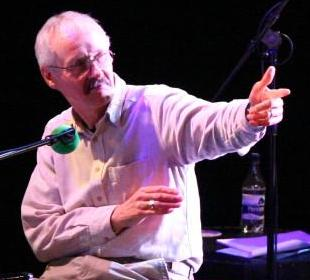
- Sell playing piano for the I'm Sorry I Haven't a Clue Christmas Special 2007 at the Lyric Theatre, Shaftesbury Avenue
- Born: 1 December 1948 (age 77); Purley, Surrey, England
- Occupation: Pianist
- Known for: Whose Line Is It Anyway? I'm Sorry I Haven't a Clue

Colin Sell (born 1 December 1948) is a British pianist who has appeared on the radio panel games Whose Line Is It Anyway? and I'm Sorry I Haven't a Clue. He has become famous mostly for his long service on the latter show, where he is frequently the butt of the host's jokes about the supposedly poor quality of his playing.

== Personal life ==
Colin Sell was born in Purley, Surrey and grew up in Croydon, attending Trinity School. He gained a Bachelor of Arts degree in Spanish and Latin American Studies from the University of Bristol in 1971.

== Career ==
Sell wrote music for the University of Bristol's revues in the early 1970s, leading to performances at the Edinburgh Festival Fringe, where Simon Brett saw Sell perform and offered him the pianist position on I'm Sorry I Haven't a Clue. He also appeared with the Yvonne Arnaud Theatre TIE company in the early 1970s, which also included two other well-known names, Elizabeth Estensen and Clive Hornby, both long-standing members of the Emmerdale cast.

He took on the role of Head of Music at Rose Bruford College, Sidcup, Kent, in 1990, and was instrumental in the creation of the BA (Hons) Actor-Musician course there.

He became Head of Music at East 15 Acting School, Essex, in 1998, and remained on staff until at least April 2015. He occasionally provides live musical accompaniment for The Comedy Store Players, a comedy improvisation group based in The Comedy Store in London.

He appeared in an episode of Foyle's War as a pianist and composed the score for the 1984 BBC Television Shakespeare production of Shakespeare's The Life and Death of King John.

He has accompanied Barry Cryer and Willie Rushton in their stage show Two Old Farts in the Night. After the interval he played (and sang) a solo: "We are the Boys in the Band". In 2013 he appeared with Barry Cryer in Richmond, Yorkshire, as part of the Swaledale Festival, performing jazz and blues and songs of his own composition.

He has arranged and directed music for radio plays such as Born to be Wilde: An Ideal Husband in 2018.
