= Melanie Gutteridge =

English actress

Melanie Gutteridge is an English actress, best known for playing PC Emma Keane in The Bill. She made two appearances in Not Going Out playing Amy.

== Biography ==
Gutteridge was born in Waltham Forest, Essex, and studied at the Webber Douglas Academy of Dramatic Art from 1994 to 1997. She is married to actor Rufus Wright, who guest starred in a 2008 episode of The Bill.

== Career ==
=== Filmography ===
Television
Year	Title	Role	Notes
1998	The New Adventures of Robin Hood	Bathsheba Flanagan	Episode: "The Haunted Castle"
1998	Picking Up the Pieces	Charlotte	Episode: #1.6
1999	Casualty	Clare Pickering	Episode: "The Hardest Word"
1999	Warriors	Lawyer	Mini-series; episode 2
2000	The Vice	Donna	Episodes: "Walking on Water: Parts 1 & 2"
2000	Arabian Nights	Fair Face	Mini-series; 2 episodes
2000	Dalziel and Pascoe	Susie	Episode: "Cunning Old Fox"
2000	Dark Realm	Cara Miller	Episode: "She's the One"
2001	Dr. Terrible's House of Horrible	Elizabeth Tyburn	Episode: "Frenzy of Tongs"
2002	Manchild	Sonja	Episode: "Art"
2002–2003	Rockface	Caroline Morrison	14 episodes (series 1 & 2)
2003	15 Storeys High	Lindsay / Karen	Episode: "The Model"
2004	The Bill	Annette Flemming	Episode: "Nemesis" (series 20)
2006	Doctors	Molly	Episode: "Bright Spark"
2006–2008	The Bill	PC Emma Keane	96 episodes (series 22–24)
2008	Doctors	Caroline Martindale	Episode: "Holding Back"
2009, 2014	Not Going Out	Amy	2 episodes: "Amy" and "Wedding"
2010	Coronation Street	Ms. Waller	6 episodes, May–June 2010
2010	Doctors	Laura Inman	Episode: "Echoes"
2012	Casualty	Becky Dawkins	Episode: "Sixteen Candles"
2013	Doctors	Sophie Aldbrook	Episode: "Charged", appeared on 14 November 2013
2015	Holby City	Victoria Blaine	Episode: "The Beat Goes On", appeared on 3 February 2015
2016	People Just Do Nothing	Lisa	Episode: "Dubplate"
2017	EastEnders	Liz James	1 episode, appeared on 15 May 2017
2017	The Watchers in the Woods	Kate Carstairs	Television film
2018	Shakespeare & Hathaway: Private Investigators	Veronica Vinten	Episode: "O Brave New World", appeared on 26 February 2018
2018	Doctors	Ruby Ashbury	2 episodes: "The Agitator" and "Immunity"
2019	London Kills	Helen Holt	Episode: "Stag Night"
2020	The Salisbury Poisonings	Claire Sturgess	Mini-series; 2 episodes
2021	Doctors	Rachel Coleman	Episode: "Day of Reckoning", appeared on 29 April 2021
2021	Goldie's Oldies	Sherri	16 episodes
2022	Murder in Provence	Béatrice de Keppel Valois	Episode: #1.2
2022	The Undeclared War	Chrissie	2 episodes
2023	Platform 7	School Principal	3 episodes
2024	Casualty	Emma Bower	Episode: "Man's Best Friend"
2024	The Fall: Skydive Murder Plot	Maddy Hennah	Documentary series
2025	Professor T.	Tilly Walsh	Episode: "The Inspection"
Films
Year	Title	Role	Notes
1999	G:MT – Greenwich Mean Time	Lucy	
2000	LoveRoy	Wife	Short film
2001	Amazons and Gladiators	Briana	This film borrowed plot elements from "Conan the Barbarian"
2001	Large	Sophie	
2002	Long Time Dead	Annie	
2004	Big Girl, Little Girl	Girlfriend	Short film. Character's name was given as "Clare" in dialogue
2008	Bloodline	Laura Turner	Short film
2012	Dog Boy	Trevor's Mother	Short film
2014	The Guvnors	Angie	
2021	What the Eye Don't See	Anna Charlton	Short film

=== Theatre ===
Gutteridge's appearances include in the original productions of the Alan Ayckbourn plays Drowning on Dry Land and Private Fears in Public Places in 2004–2005.
