= Jeremy Hardy vs. the Israeli Army =

- Directed by: Leila Sansour
- Release date: 2003
- Running time: 75 minutes
- Language: English

Jeremy Hardy vs. the Israeli Army is a 2003 feature documentary directed by Leila Sansour and starring comedian Jeremy Hardy. It follows the International Solidarity Movement and their activities in Palestine.

== Reviews ==
- Bradshaw, Peter (18 July 2003). "Jeremy Hardy vs the Israeli Army". The Guardian.
- NB (2003). "Jeremy Hardy versus the Israeli Army". Time Out London.
- Murphy, Maureen Clare (27 May 2003). "Documentary review: 'Jeremy Hardy vs. the Israeli Army'". The Electronic Intifada.
- Tookey, Chris (2003). "Jeremy Hardy Vs The Israeli Army". movie-film-review.com.
