= Unnatural Acts (radio series) =

Unnatural Acts is a BBC radio comedy series written by, and starring, Jeremy Hardy and Kit Hollerbach (who, at the time, were married) as "The Hardys" with Paul B Davies and Caroline Leddy as "Paul and Caroline". Two series were made in 1987 and 1988, with the third renamed At Home with the Hardys and broadcast in 1990. Further script input was from Pete Sinclair. The show was played as a straight sitcom but with considerable surreal elements. Much humour was had from Hollerbach's exaggeratedly American reactions to English life.

The title of the third series may have been a play on the 1950s BBC radio series Life with the Lyons, which also starred a real married couple as themselves.

It was produced and directed by David Tyler.
