= You Start, I'll Join In =

Radio program

You Start, I'll Join In is a British radio sitcom that was first broadcast on BBC Radio 2 from September to October 1987. It was written by David Bond and Paul Hawksbee, and produced by Pete Atkin.

The series starred George Layton as Mac and Vas Blackwood as Trevor, a drummer and a pianist in a two-man band. The series followed their wacky adventures. It ran for six episodes of approximately 30 minutes each. The series is currently lost from the BBC Archives.
