= And This is Them =

Radio program

And This is Them is a short-lived radio program that aired from November 1999 until December 1999. There were seven half-hour episodes and it was broadcast on BBC Radio 2. It starred Sean Hughes.

== Notes and references ==
Lavalie, John. "And This is Them." EpGuides. 21 Jul 2005. 29 Jul 2005 <https://web.archive.org/web/20070814195327/http://www.epguides.com/AndThisisThem/%3E.
