= Debbie Barham =

English comedy writer (1976–2003)

Deborah Ann Barham (20 November 1976 – 20 April 2003) was an English comedy writer who died at the age of 26 of heart failure brought on as a result of anorexia. As well as writing for TV and radio, Barham wrote columns for newspapers and magazines.

== Life ==
Barham was born 20 November 1976 in Sheffield, England. She was educated at Sheffield High School and was a bright student, but left school early as she was unhappy there.

She began her professional writing career at the age of 15, moved to London at the age of 16, and was working as a BBC contract writer at the age of 17. In 1995, Barham developed anorexia nervosa.

Her early work was submitted under the name D. A. Barham, out of concern that a teenage girl would not be accepted in a world traditionally dominated by Oxbridge-educated men.

During her eleven-year career she wrote for comedians including Clive Anderson, Rory Bremner, Angus Deayton, Bob Monkhouse and Graham Norton, and for BBC programmes including The News Huddlines, The News Quiz, Loose Ends and Week Ending. She also wrote the eight-part radio sitcom The Elephant Man, which starred Peter Serafinowicz and was broadcast on BBC Radio 2 in 1996. Though little known by the general public, she was greatly respected in the profession, and had a reputation for mental quickness, her writing being not only of high quality but also fast and prolific, even during her illness. She wrote a column for Computeractive magazine for the few years prior to her death.

The radio show About a Dog was based on her last comedy proposal.

== Bibliography ==
- Peter Barham & Alan Hurndall (2006) The Invisible Girl: A Father's Moving Story of the Daughter He Lost Harper Element ISBN 0-00-720542-2
