= Sounding Brass (radio show) =

Sounding Brass is a phone-in programme presented by Gloria Hunniford on BBC Radio 2. Listeners were invited to choose a Christmas carol or hymn while a Salvation Army band, which included the famous Chalk Farm Band, played their requests live in the studio.

The brass bands had a vast repertoire and could typically play a hymn tune within forty seconds of the request being made. A guest hymnologist was available to explain the origins of the music and provide background on the composition of the lyrics. Among the regular Bandmasters who appeared was Ray Steadman-Allen, the famous Salvation Army band composer. The programme was devised and first presented by Owen Spencer-Thomas on BBC Radio London in 1977. It ran until the mid-1990s.

Its sister programme, Sounding Brass Strikes Again, which featured brass bands from across London, was broadcast on BBC Radio London starting on 2 August 1978.

== See also ==
- List of UK radio programmes
