= I'm Sorry I Haven't a Clue =

BBC radio comedy panel show (since 1972)

- The show's panel (including guest panellist Jeremy Hardy, top middle) with host Jack Dee (bottom row, left) in 2010.
- Genre: Comedy panel game
- Running time: 30 minutes
- Country of origin: United Kingdom
- Language: English
- Home station: BBC Radio 4
- Syndicates: BBC Radio 4 Extra
- Hosted by: Barry Cryer (1972 only); Humphrey Lyttelton (1972–2007); Jack Dee (2009–present)
- Starring: Tim Brooke-Taylor (1972–2020); Barry Cryer (1972–2022); Graeme Garden; Willie Rushton (1974–1996); Colin Sell; Tony Hawks (2023–present); Various guests (see list)
- Created by: The I'm Sorry, I'll Read That Again team
- Produced by: Various (see list)
- Recording studio: Various
- Original release: 11 April 1972
- No. of series: 84
- Audio format: Stereo
- Opening theme: "The Schickel Shamble" by Ron Goodwin
- Website: www.bbc.co.uk/programmes/b006qnwb

I'm Sorry I Haven't a Clue is a BBC radio comedy panel game. Billed as "the antidote to panel games", it consists of two teams of two comedians being given "silly things to do" by the host. The show was launched in April 1972 as a parody of radio and TV panel games, and has been broadcast since on BBC Radio 4 and the BBC World Service, with repeats aired on BBC Radio 4 Extra and, in the 1980s and 1990s, on BBC Radio 2. The 50th series was broadcast in November and December 2007.

After a period of split chairmanship in the first series, Humphrey Lyttelton ("Humph") served in this role from the programme's inception until his hospitalisation and subsequent death in 2008, which led to the cancellation of the 2008 series. The show recommenced on 15 June 2009 with Lyttelton replaced by three hosts: Stephen Fry, Jack Dee and Rob Brydon. Dee went on to host all episodes of the 52nd series later that year, and continues in that role. The chairman's script was for a long time written by Iain Pattinson, who worked on the show from 1992 until his death in 2021.

== History ==
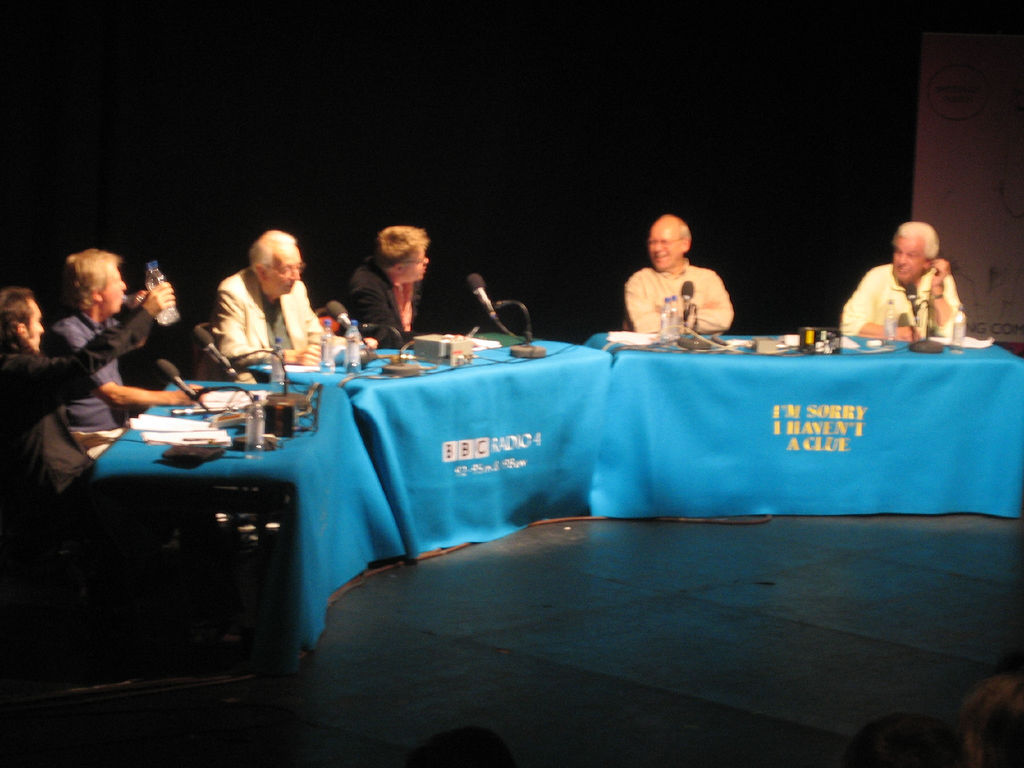
(L-R) Ross Noble, Tim Brooke-Taylor, Humphrey Lyttelton, producer Jon Naismith, Graeme Garden and Barry Cryer during a 2005 recording. Naismith is sitting in the chair reserved for "Samantha".

I'm Sorry I Haven't a Clue developed from the long-running radio sketch show I'm Sorry, I'll Read That Again, the writers of which were John Cleese, Jo Kendall, David Hatch, The Goodies trio Bill Oddie, Tim Brooke-Taylor and especially Graeme Garden who suggested the idea of an unscripted show which, it was decided, would take the form of a parody panel game. A panel game with no competition was not itself a new idea: the BBC had a history of successful quiz shows designed to allow witty celebrities to entertain where winning was not important. Examples include Ignorance Is Bliss, Just a Minute, My Word! and My Music on the radio and Call My Bluff on television.

The pilot episode (at that time titled I'm Sorry, They're At It Again) opened with Graeme Garden and Jo Kendall singing the words of "Three Blind Mice" to the tune of "Ol' Man River" followed by Bill Oddie and Tim Brooke-Taylor performing the lyrics of "Sing a Song of Sixpence" to the melody of "These Foolish Things". Dave Lee, who was bandleader on I'm Sorry, I'll Read That Again, was at the piano and a number of rounds were introduced by a short phrase of music. Other rounds included "Dialogue Read in a Specific Accent" and "Songs Sung as Animals". In 1974 Bill Oddie was replaced by Willie Rushton, with Barry Cryer replacing Jo Kendall as Graeme Garden's teammate, and Humphrey Lyttelton as chairman, and the personnel remained constant from this point until Rushton's death in 1996, although occasional guest panellists appeared in the 1980s and early 1990s (see below). Since then the panel has featured a variety of guest comedians.

As of 2003, the show had over two million listeners on Radio 4 and its recording sessions typically filling 1,500-seat theatres within a week of being advertised. At least one recording for the spring 2006 series filled all its seats within three hours of the free tickets being made available, and the London recording of the autumn series in that year sold out in ten minutes. Although there are twelve Clue shows broadcast per year these are the result of just six recording sessions, with two programmes being recorded back-to-back. The show was recently voted the second funniest radio programme ever, after The Goon Show. It has a large following among professional comedians such as Armando Iannucci, who turned down opportunities to work on it as he preferred to remain a listener.

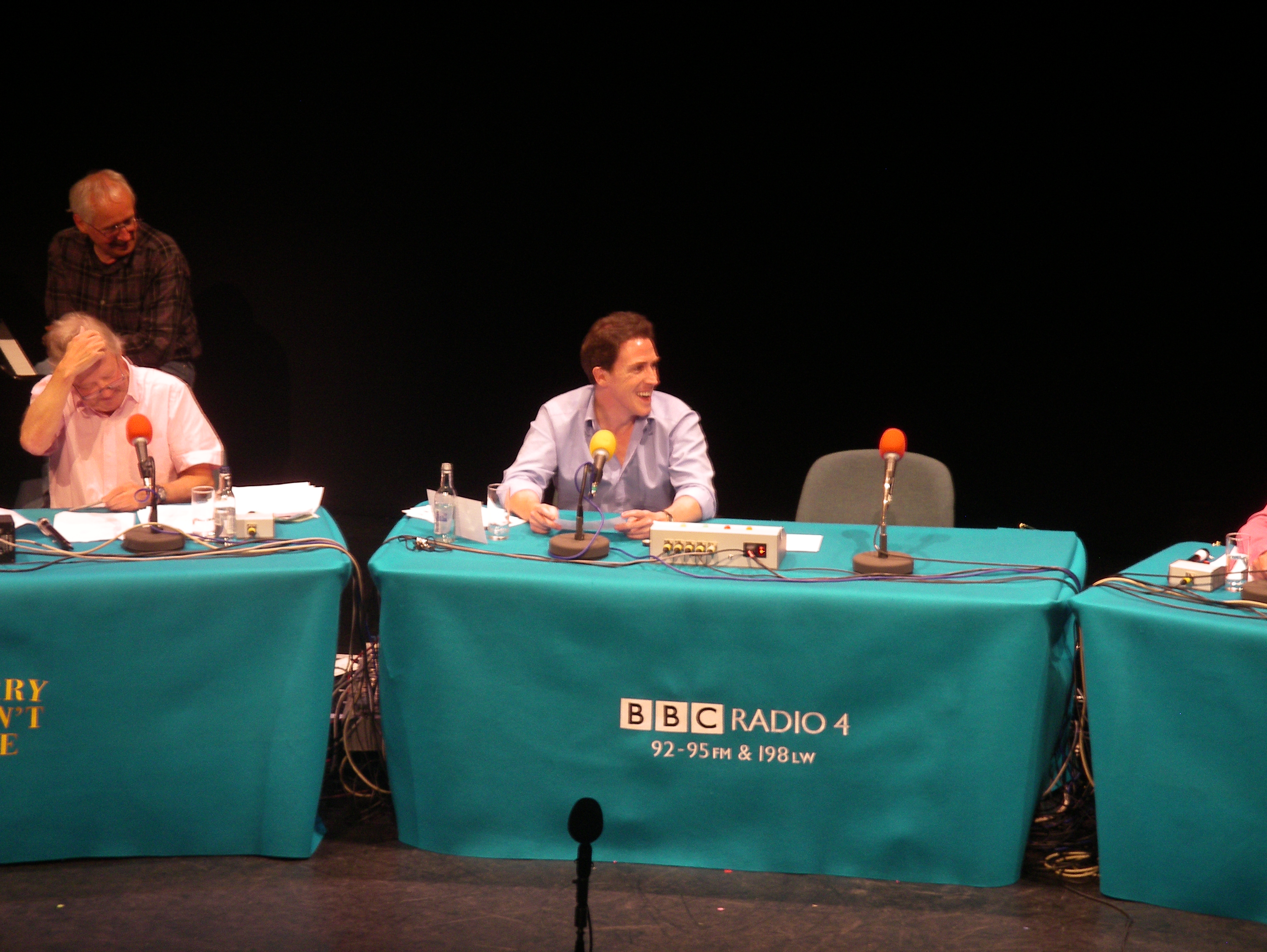
Rob Brydon (centre) chairs the Newcastle recording of I'm Sorry I Haven't a Clue. Also pictured are Tim Brooke-Taylor (low left) and Colin Sell (top left). The chair next to Brydon with the microphone is 'used' by "Samantha"

The official, authorised history of the show and ISIRTA, The Clue Bible by Jem Roberts, was published by Preface Publishing in October 2009.

== Participants ==
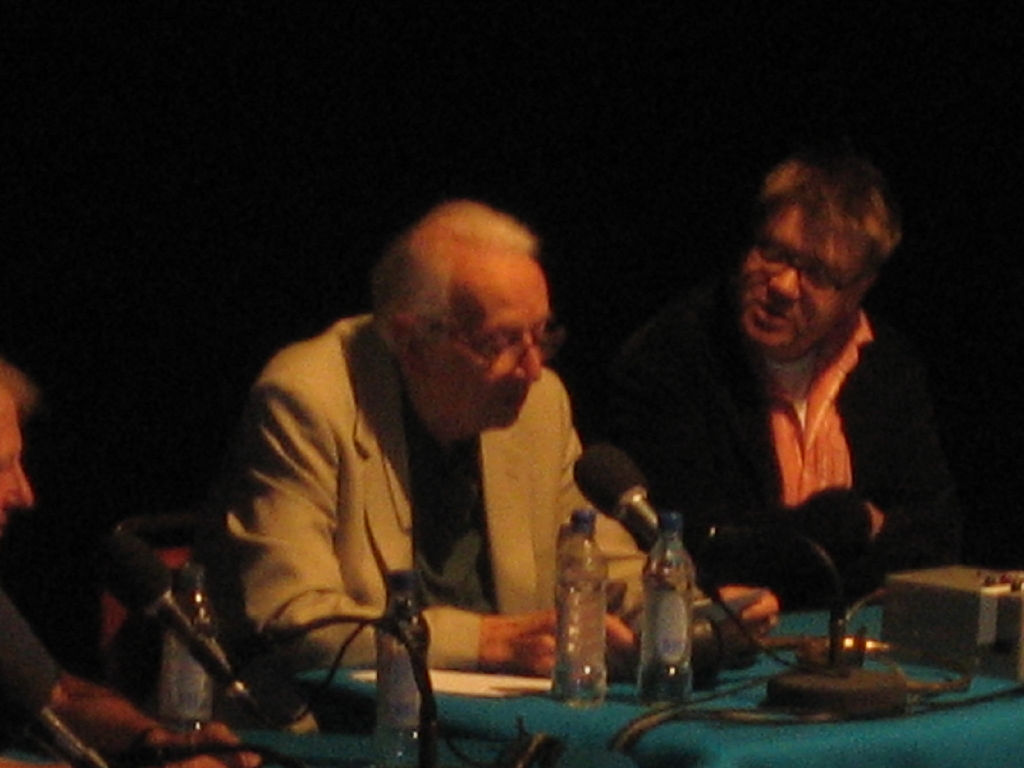
Humphrey Lyttelton and producer Jon Naismith during a 2005 recording of I'm Sorry I Haven't a Clue at the Edinburgh Fringe.

=== Chairman ===
Humphrey Lyttelton, primarily known as a jazz trumpeter and bandleader, and known as Humph to his friends, was invited to be chairman because of the role played by improvisation in both comedy and jazz music. In the first series Lyttelton shared the role of chairman with Barry Cryer but he made it his own (especially once Cryer replaced Cleese as a regular panellist) and continued as chairman until his death on 25 April 2008. He read the script introducing the programme and segments in an utterly deadpan manner. He claimed the secret was just to read what was in front of him without understanding why it was funny. He adopted the grumpy persona of someone who would really rather be somewhere else, which he attributed to worrying that, surrounded by four professional comedians, he would have nothing worthwhile to chip in. He did occasionally depart from the script, however, often bringing the house down with an ad-lib. He was credited by the regular panellists as being the chief reason for the show's longevity.

On 18 April 2008, the producer of I'm Sorry I Haven't A Clue, Jon Naismith, announced that, owing to hospitalisation to repair an aortic aneurysm, Humphrey Lyttelton would be unable to record the scheduled shows and that they would have to be postponed. The final show of the 2008 Best of tour on 22 April would be presented by Rob Brydon. Following Lyttelton's death there was speculation that the series might be cancelled because replacing him would be extremely difficult if not impossible. In a eulogy in The Guardian, Barry Cryer did not allude to the future of the programme but said that there's "got to be an agonising reappraisal" and that Lyttelton was the "very hub of the show". Cryer, Tim Brooke-Taylor and Graeme Garden all ruled themselves out as hosts: Cryer did not think the programme would work if a panellist became chairman and it "would need somebody of stature to be parachuted in". Jeremy Hardy also ruled himself out, saying "Humph had big shoes to fill and I wouldn't do it."

In the Clue mailout for September 2008, Naismith stated: "Despite the rumours, we've made no decisions about possible replacements for Humph, and are unlikely to make any decisions this year at least. Certainly I don't envisage us selecting anyone on a permanent basis for several series." It was announced that the show would continue recording beginning in 2009. The first new shows would be hosted by rotating guest presenters (similarly to the format of Have I Got News for You) before a permanent replacement host was decided. In the Clue mailout for February 2009, Naismith announced that Stephen Fry, Jack Dee and Rob Brydon would host two shows each, to be recorded in April, May and June 2009 respectively. The programme returned on 15 June 2009, chaired by Fry with the usual panellists and special guest Victoria Wood. Every series since then has been chaired by Dee.

=== Panellists ===
The regular panellists for much of the show's early history were:

- Graeme Garden was a member of the I'm Sorry, I'll Read That Again team from which the programme grew and has been a panellist since the first episode. Lyttelton described him as very dry, biding his time before stepping in with a perfect punchline. Garden was absent from January 2016 for the whole of series 65, 66 and 67. On 12 October 2017, Garden announced that he would be rejoining the team, but has only appeared infrequently since. His last appearance on the show was in December 2022. Following the death of Barry Cryer, Garden is the last surviving original panellist.
- Barry Cryer hosted six episodes in the show's first series before moving to a permanent seat on the panel. He was credited by then-chairman Lyttelton as being the show's "bricks and mortar", providing quick-fire one-liners in any situation. There is a running joke in the programme that he is a dirty old man with a drink problem. He died aged 86 in January 2022. His final appearance on the show was in December 2021.
- Tim Brooke-Taylor was also part of the I'm Sorry, I'll Read That Again team and was also with the show from the start until his Covid-related death in April 2020. He was very popular with the crowd and adopted a vulnerable persona. Garden and Brooke-Taylor had previously worked together on television in The Goodies alongside Bill Oddie, and Brooke-Taylor in particular would occasionally drop references to that show into some of the games, eliciting cheers from the audience. His final appearance on the show was in December 2020.
- Willie Rushton was one of the regular panel members from 1974 until his death in 1996. The other panellists have fond memories of his off-the-wall sense of humour and quick-fire puns. Since Rushton's death his seat has become a permanent guest spot, which was often filled by the late Jeremy Hardy when on non-broadcast tours. Guests have also appeared when one of the regulars was unavailable. His final appearance on the show was in December 1996.

In addition to the above, the below have also been frequent panellists on the show and have been regulars on the ISIHAC tours:

- Jeremy Hardy was a frequently panellist on the show after Willie Rushton's death, as well as being a regular panellist on the ISIHAC tours from 2007 to 2017. His final appearance on the show was in July 2018.
- Tony Hawks has appeared in every series for the last 10 years, and to date the most frequent guest on the show, and in more recent years often appearing in more than the customary guests 2 episodes a series (a semi-regular panellist), as well as being a regular panellist on the ISIHAC tours since 2017.
- Miles Jupp has frequently appeared in the series in recent years and is the only other individual to appear in more than the customary guests 2 episodes a series (a semi-regular panellist), as well as being a regular panellist on the ISIHAC tours since 2020.
- Pippa Evans has appeared in most of the series over the last 10 years, as well being a regular panellist on ISIHAC tours since 2022.
- Rory Bremner has appeared in most of the series over the last 10 years, as well being a regular panellist on ISIHAC tours since 2022.
- Joe Lycett started as a panelist in Series 84 episode 5, which originally aired in December 2025, and is a current regular panelist.

Since series 75 (post lockdown recordings), the show has used a wider variety of panellists with fewer regulars. In addition to the above the most frequent guests have been Marcus Brigstocke, Rachel Parris, Henning Wehn, Milton Jones, Fred MacAulay, Andy Hamilton, Lucy Porter and Vicki Pepperdine.

=== Producers ===
The show has had a number of producers over the years:

- David Hatch (produced only the pilot episode in 1972)
- John Cassels (1972–74)
- Simon Brett (1975–77)
- Geoffrey Perkins (1978–81)
- Paul Mayhew-Archer (1982–86)
- Paul Spencer (1987–89)
- Jon Magnusson (1990–91)
- Jon Naismith (1991–present)

=== Musical accompaniment ===
Early episodes featured Dave Lee, who provided piano accompaniment on I'm Sorry, I'll Read That Again. However, Colin Sell now usually fills this role. He is often the butt of jokes about his musical ability, to which he is unable to respond as he has no microphone. For example: "When music experts hear Colin's compositions, they say he could have been another Berlin, Porter or anybody else employed by the German State Railway." Guest pianists, including Neil Innes, Denis King and Matthew Scott, have been called in when Sell has been unable to attend (or the ISIHAC team have "won the coin toss" as Lyttelton once said on the show). Lyttelton's band also appeared on a couple of Christmas specials.

On one occasion when Innes was guesting, Lyttelton outlined the musician's career, concluding that this "has brought him to where he is today: standing in for Colin Sell." In another appearance, Innes sang along to his own composition "I'm the Urban Spaceman" during a round of "Pick Up Song".

The theme music is called "The Schickel Shamble", by Ron Goodwin, and is from the film Monte Carlo or Bust! It was chosen by David Hatch.

=== Scorers ===
Since 18 May 1985 (in the episode in which Kenny Everett made his debut), the show has included a fictional and completely silent scorer "whose job is eased by the fact no points are actually awarded". Usually this is "the lovely Samantha", who sits on the Chairman's left hand. There is a seat with a microphone next to the Chairman which is "used" by Samantha. During the introductory music, Humphrey Lyttelton would stand up and "help" Samantha into her seat. In practice, the seat and microphone were only used by the producer to welcome the audience, to introduce the participants and to give any other information to the audience such as the expected date of broadcasting, and to supervise re-recordings of fluffs made in the programme.

Lyttelton would describe Samantha's social activities, usually in an apology received from the unseen character who had been detained, often with a "gentleman friend". His comments included sexual innuendo and double entendres, such as "Samantha likes nothing better than a little potter in the woodshed in the morning", though many were far more daring and explicit. This has continued under Jack Dee's chairmanship.

During early episodes of Samantha's appearance on the show, it was not completely clear that she was a fictional character, garnering complaints about the sexist and humiliating treatment she received. Producer Jon Naismith recalled "when we [Naismith and Iain Pattinson] took over the show we used to get quite a few letters accusing us of sexist references to Samantha" (the character was named after the page 3 topless model Samantha Fox). Samantha's inabilities as score-keeper often form the basis for humour; in a programme from 1997, Humph said: "It's just occurred to me that Samantha hasn't given us the score... since 1981."

Samantha has sometimes been replaced by a Swedish stand-in, Sven, or occasionally another substitute, Monica. When Margaret Thatcher left office in 1990 Lyttelton introduced a scorer named Margaret. In an episode in November 1991 both Samantha and Sven were present but occupied with each other and unable to award points.

The programme's scoring is completely non-existent. Most of the show is scripted, but in rounds such as "Sound charades", where one team of panellists have to guess the charade of the other team, the answer may be obvious (usually a pun) but the opposing team are not told the answer. In recording, it has taken them many minutes to come up with the correct answer, most of which has to be edited out before broadcast.

In rounds in which the panel must not see what the audience sees, there is the "advanced laser display-board" (in reality, a sign with the answer written on, held by Jon Naismith). These boards are sometimes described in more elaborate terms and as "so generously funded by our hosts". The names and phrases on them are conveyed to "listeners at home" by the "mystery voice", alluding to the 1960s radio programme Twenty Questions.

=== Correspondence ===
A regular feature on the programme, preceding the game Mornington Crescent, is a fictional letters section which begins with the chairman's comments ("I notice from the sheer weight of this week's postbag, we've received a little over no letters" and "I see from the number of letters raining down on us this week that the Scrabble factory has exploded again"). The invariably single letter each week is from "A Mrs Trellis of North Wales" (one of the many prompts for a cheer from the audience), whose incoherent letters usually mistake the chairman for another Radio 4 presenter or media personality. "Dear Libby" (she writes), "why oh why ... very nearly spells YOYO", or "Dear Mr Titchmarsh, never let them tell you that size isn't important. My aunt told me that, but then all my new wallpaper fell off."

== Format ==
=== Introduction ===
The chairman introduces the show by introducing the place where they are recording from and giving factoids about the location which lead to a punchline, usually at the location's expense. The teams are then introduced in a deprecating manner that portrays them as has-beens, followed by the scorer for the evening who is either Samantha or Sven.

=== Games ===
Many games are played on I'm Sorry I Haven't a Clue, some frequently and dozens less often. A few have been played only once, either because the joke works only once or because they were not particularly successful. Popular games include "One Song to the Tune of Another", "Mornington Crescent", "Sound Charades", "Late Arrivals", "Double Feature", "Cheddar Gorge" and "Uxbridge English Dictionary". "One Song to the Tune of Another" is always introduced using a complex analogy, despite its self-explanatory title, often ending with a joke at the expense of Colin Sell.

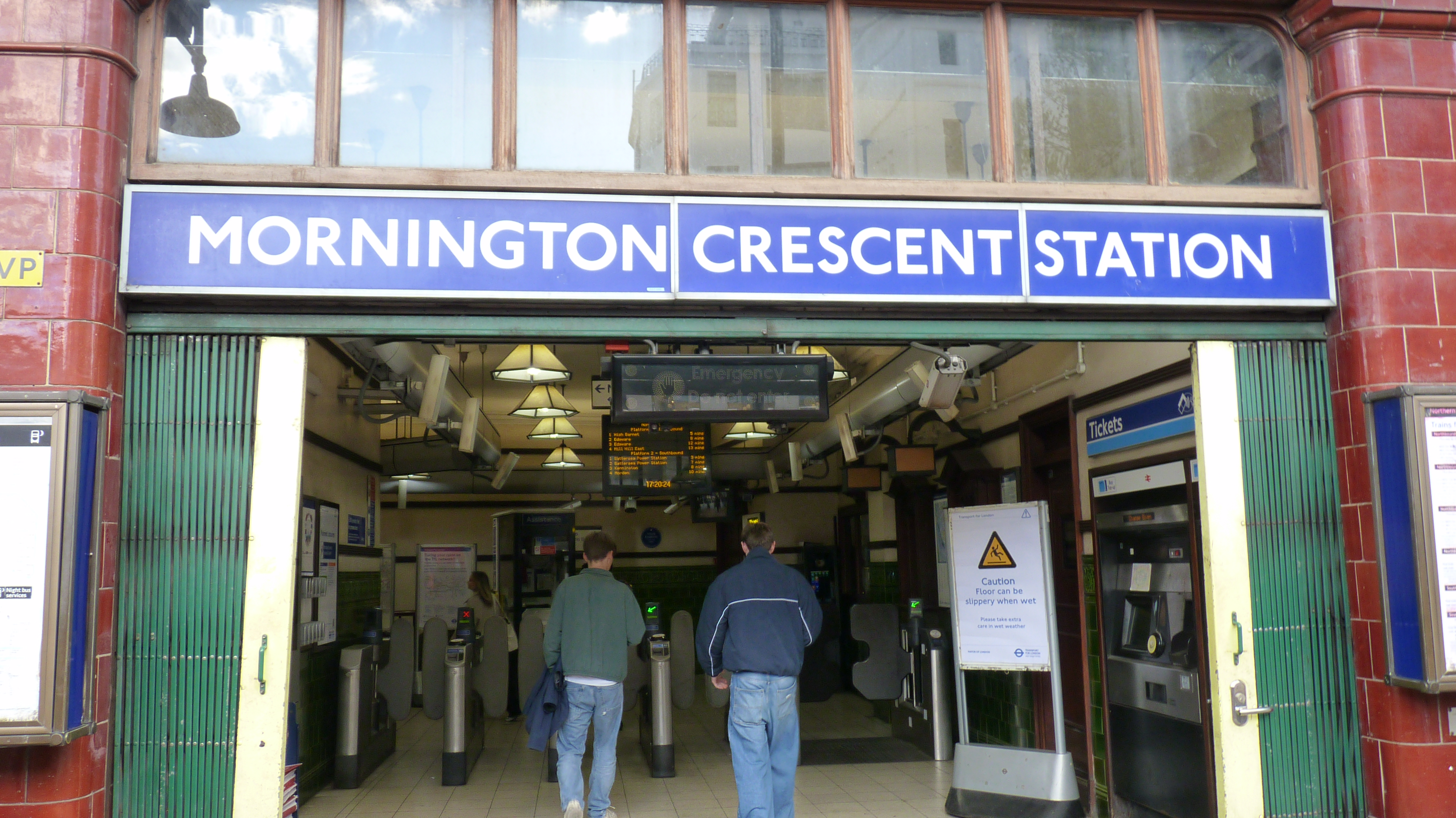

Most episodes follow a format, and the same games are played in sequence in most series. The first, third and fifth episodes of a series (recorded first of two shows in each location) usually includes "One Song to the Tune of Another" as the second round, and the alternate episodes feature "Pick-up Song" in the same slot. "Uxbridge English Dictionary" usually begins the second recording session, and the same session will usually include "Mornington Crescent". "Sound Charades" is typically featured in the odd-numbered episodes. This pattern is more consistent in later episodes.

The panellists play as individuals or as two teams. "Celebrity What's My Line?" completely destroyed the intent of the original — for players to guess the occupation of a third party by asking yes/no questions. The I'm Sorry I Haven't a Clue version once employed the famous actress (and fan of the show) Dame Judi Dench in this role and the renowned television gardener Alan Titchmarsh. Each began by performing a mime illustrating their occupation, giving a cryptic clue to the panel (appearing to a radio listener as a short silence punctuated by exclamations from the panel and laughter from the studio audience), before fielding apparently serious questions from the teams (e.g. "Is that your own hair?" or "Do you kill people for money?"), who pretended not to know who they were.

Musical games often involve incongruities such as singing "One Song to the Tune of Another" or playing a song using only a swanee whistle and a kazoo. In "Just a Minim" – a parody of Radio 4's Just a Minute – panellists must sing a specified song avoiding repetition, deviation, or hesitation: the chosen songs often have extremely repetitive lyrics.

Humour is derived from wordplay such as puns or mockery of styles of speech. For example, in a round based on suggesting television programmes from biblical times, suggestions included They Think It's All Jehovah, I Love Lucifer and The Exodus Files.

In "Uxbridge English Dictionary", panellists contribute humorous redefinitions of words; such as "Puny: the Roman Catholic equivalent of tennis elbow". More puns are found in the "Arrivals at the Ball" section, of the form "Mr and Mrs X and their son (or daughter)...." the child's name forming a pun, preferably laboured and feeble. This grew out of the "drama" section of later shows in the I'm Sorry, I'll Read That Again series; for example, at the Criminals' Ball, "Mr and Mrs Knee, and their Swedish son, Lars Knee".

According to Tim Brooke-Taylor, twenty per cent of the show is ad-libbed. According to Willie Rushton, it is more like fifty per cent, but he didn't think that a bad thing.

=== Time, destiny, fate and eternity ===
The show draws to a close with the chairman imparting some final words of wisdom intended to evoke time, destiny, fate and eternity, undercut with silliness. For example: "...And so, as the hunter of time blasts the moose of eternity, and the dairy counter worker of fate sighs and grabs her mop..." Lyttelton's final sign-off on the show, shortly before his death in April 2008, was:

And so as the loose-bowelled pigeon of time swoops low over the unsuspecting tourist of destiny, and the flatulent skunk of fate wanders into the air-conditioning system of eternity, I notice it's the end of the show.

— Humphrey Lyttelton, I'm Sorry I Haven't a Clue, broadcast 17 December 2007

== Humour ==
Most of the humour is detached from the real world. Steve Punt cites it as one of his favourite radio shows because "there's no points being made or targets being attacked." Contemporary references occasionally made by participants are usually asides. The show does occasionally comment on the outside world, though from an innocent perspective. The game "Complete George Bush Quotes" was once played, in which the teams had to supply endings for phrases that George Bush had begun (see Bushism), the teams complaining that they couldn't be any funnier than the original; similar rounds with guessing or completing quotes of other well-known public figures and personalities have also been played.

The regular panellists are represented by the chairman to be unfunny, struggling comedians who have been doing the same act for many years. The supposed personalities of the panellists as demonstrated by the chairman, fictitious but drawn from their public personas, is also a recurring theme. Barry Cryer was often represented as a tight-fisted alcoholic who could not wait to get to the pub (but who never bought a round of drinks), while Tim Brooke-Taylor was often represented as willing to take any small performance job in his quiet career and always campaigning for repeats of The Goodies (something which Brooke-Taylor himself played upon in many rounds). Humphrey Lyttelton often delivered mock comments of how boring and low quality the show was and, particularly in his later years on the show, preferring to doze off rather than listen to the rounds. Pianist Colin Sell, meanwhile, is often the butt of jokes regarding his supposedly terrible musical skills (despite in reality being an accomplished musician).

According to Willie Rushton, "The show gets quite filthy at times, but the audience love it." After fifty years on the air, one of the most important aspects of the show is its huge stock of running gags which, if not always funny in themselves, can elicit huge anticipatory laughter from the studio audience. The mere mention of Lionel Blair often brought roars of laughter in anticipation of an outrageous double-entendre based on his supposed homosexuality (he was not gay). Similarly, particular mention of points scorer Samantha or her male replacement Sven (neither of whom actually exists) will typically bring laughter in anticipation of a sexual double-entendre.

In the "Film Club" round, any reference by Graeme Garden to Bring Me the Head of Alfredo Garcia is sure to cause a similar response. The game "Wobbling Bunnies" was introduced several times by Humph, often with eager anticipation by the panel and audience, but time pressures always meant the game was never actually played. Graeme Garden and Barry Cryer frequently played the characters of two Scots, Hamish and Dougal, whose skits usually began with the phrase "You'll have had your tea?", as a stereotypical Scots miser when receiving a guest never offers any food or drink. The characters were developed into their own Radio 4 show, Hamish and Dougal, which also featured Jeremy Hardy. Another long-running gag involves one of the panellists putting forward a challenge of "hesitation" when another panellist leaves a long pause in the middle of speaking, a reference to another long-running Radio 4 panel show, Just a Minute. (Likewise, occasionally on Just a Minute, a panellist will make a challenge of "Mornington Crescent".) Chairman Humphrey Lyttelton frequently poked fun at Just a Minute and its chairman Nicholas Parsons. Lyttelton's successor, Jack Dee, continued with and expanded upon this, mimicking Parsons while he was still alive by constantly emphasising the long experience of some panellists, and the fact that the programme can be heard all over the world.

== Awards ==
The programme has won the Gold Sony Radio Comedy Award three times:

- 1995: featuring Humphrey Lyttelton, Barry Cryer, Graeme Garden, Tim Brooke-Taylor and Willie Rushton
- 2002: featuring the usual cast and Jeremy Hardy.
- 2004: I'm Sorry I Haven't A Christmas Carol, featuring the usual cast with Stephen Fry, Andy Hamilton, Jeremy Hardy, Tony Hawks, Sandi Toksvig and Linda Smith.

Other awards:

- 1995: Best Radio Comedy, British Comedy Award
- 1997: Radio Programme of the Year, British Press Guild
- 1997: Radio Programme of the Year, Voice of the Viewer and Listener
- 2003: Radio Programme of the Year, Voice of the Viewer and Listener
- 2003: Radio Programme of the Year, Television and Radio Industries Club
- 2003: Best Comedy, Spoken Word Award
- 2005: Radio Programme of the Year, Television and Radio Industries Club

In 2020 the programme was voted the greatest radio comedy of all time by a panel convened by Radio Times.

== BBC Audiobook releases ==
- Volume 1 (ISBN 0-563-53679-9)
- Volume 2 (ISBN 0-563-52969-5)
- Volume 3 (ISBN 0-563-52970-9)
- Volume 4 (ISBN 0-563-49462-X)
- Volume 5 (ISBN 0-563-49463-8)
- Volume 6 (ISBN 0-563-49464-6)
- Volume 7 (ISBN 0-563-53684-5)
- Volume 8 (ISBN 0-563-49542-1)
- Volume 9 (ISBN 0-563-50435-8)
- Volume 10 (ISBN 1-405-67773-2)
- Volume 11 (ISBN 1-405-68837-8)
- Volume 12 (ISBN 1-408-42719-2)
- Volume 13 (ISBN 1-408-42729-X)
- Volume 14 (ISBN 1-408-42730-3)
- Volume 15 (ISBN 1-471-33107-5)
- Volume 16 (ISBN 1-787-53005-1)
- Volume 17 (ISBN 1-787-53015-9)
- Volume 18 (ISBN 1-787-53392-1)
- Collection 1 (ISBN 0-563-52850-8) [Vols 1–3]
- Collection 2 (ISBN 0-563-49484-0) [Vols 4–6]
- Collection 3 (ISBN 0-563-51042-0) [Vols 7–9]
- Collection 4 (ISBN 1-4084-7046-2) [Vols 10–12]
- Anniversary Special (ISBN 0-563-52853-2) [Collection of Three programmes: "30th Anniversary Special", "Sorry I Haven't A Desert Island", and the first episode broadcast (11 April 1972)]
- I'm Sorry I Haven't A Christmas Clue (ISBN 0-563-52532-0)
- Live 1 (ISBN 1-846-07053-8)
- Live 2 (ISBN 1-405-68836-X)
- In Search of Mornington Crescent (ISBN 1-846-07195-X)
- I'm Sorry I Haven't A Clue: Humph in Wonderland (ISBN 1-408-42600-5)
- Specials (ISBN 1-471-31199-6) [Collection of several compilation CDs: "Christmas Carol", "Humph in Wonderland", "Anniversary Special", "In Search of Mornington Crescent", and the 2002 30th Anniversary Edition]

== WTBS recordings ==
Episodes of I'm Sorry I Haven't a Clue were included in the package of programmes held in 20 underground radio stations of the BBC's Wartime Broadcasting Service (WTBS), designed to provide public information and morale-boosting broadcasts for 100 days after a nuclear attack.
