= Iain Pattinson =

British scriptwriter (1953–2021)

Iain Pattinson

Iain Pattinson (2 January 1953 – 14 February 2021) was a British scriptwriter. His work included writing the chairman's script for the long-running BBC Radio 4 panel game I'm Sorry I Haven't a Clue, delivered by the programme's veteran chairman Humphrey Lyttelton from 1992 until Lyttelton's death in 2008. Pattinson continued to write the scripts for subsequent chairmen, including Jack Dee, for a further 11 years.

== Early life and education ==
Pattinson was born in Sidcup. He attended Chislehurst and Sidcup Grammar School, leaving before his A levels.

His father Geoffrey (1924–2018) worked in shipping; a D-Day veteran who served in the 9th Parachute Battalion, Geoffrey's portrait was painted by Jonathan Yeo for the Royal Collection in 2015.

== Career ==
After leaving school, Pattinson worked at Shell, eventually becoming a marketing executive at the company before leaving to take up comedy scriptwriting.

=== Scripts ===
Pattinson's scripts are well known for their use of double entendre, often centred around the supposed sexual proclivities of the chairman's fictitious assistant, Samantha: "Samantha is off to see a chef gentleman friend who is renowned for his fine-quality offal dishes. While she's very keen on his kidneys in red wine and his oxtail in beer, Samantha says it's difficult to beat his famous tongue in cider." They also played on whatever location the show was being recorded, such as "By the 1890s, Wimbledon was well established as a commuter town with regular horse buses running to the city. However, when the electric tramline arrived in 1907, the horses went to London on that instead." Dee said Pattinson's "unique brilliance was his ability to combine the absurd with the plausible."

Pattinson was also a writer on many other well-known TV and radio light entertainment programmes, including Week Ending, The News Quiz, Would I Lie to You? and Bring Me the Head of Light Entertainment, as well as the author of several books.

He died of leukaemia, survived by his mother Audrey and his sister Edwina.
