= UK Music Week =

UK Music Week was a nationwide music vote held in the UK, which compiled a list of the top 40 greatest musicians of all time.

Many commercial radio stations took part in the week-long event from 24 April to 1 May 2006, consisting of special programming and a results show, which was broadcast on the last day of the week and counted down the chosen artists from number 40 to number 1.

Public voting was conducted online on the UK Music Week website, and also by texting nominations to a dedicated number.

== 2006 results ==
The following artists were selected from the votes in 2006.

1. Will Young
2. Robbie Williams
3. Paul McCartney
4. Spice Girls
5. Coldplay
6. Sugababes
7. Take That
8. Gorillaz
9. Oasis
10. Beverley Knight
11. Pink Floyd
12. Arctic Monkeys
13. Simply Red
14. Jamiroquai
15. George Michael
16. Kaiser Chiefs
17. James Blunt
18. Girls Aloud
19. Keane
20. Sir Elton John
21. Queen
22. Lemar
23. McFly
24. Eurythmics
25. Basement Jaxx
26. David Gray
27. KT Tunstall
28. David Bowie
29. Franz Ferdinand
30. Craig David
31. Stereophonics
32. Duran Duran
33. Texas
34. The Beatles
35. Snow Patrol
36. Richard Ashcroft
37. Charlotte Church
38. Sting
39. Blue
40. All Saints

=== 2007 results ===
UK Music Week was held again in 2007, following much the same routine as in 2006.

1. Will Young
2. Jamiroquai
3. Wet Wet Wet
4. Take That
5. Queen
6. Simply Red
7. The Beatles
8. Robbie Williams
9. Stereophonics
10. George Michael
11. Elton John
12. T. Rex
13. Gareth Gates
14. Journey South
15. David Bowie
16. The Cure
17. Duran Duran
18. G4
19. Snow Patrol
20. Annie Lennox
21. Rod Stewart
22. Oasis
23. Paul Weller
24. Amy Winehouse
25. John Lennon
26. Phil Collins
27. Melanie C
28. Rolling Stones
29. Ub40
30. Elo
31. Coldplay
32. Beautiful South
33. Kaiser Chiefs
34. Madness
35. Bee Gees
36. James Blunt
37. Fleetwood Mac
38. Eurythmics
39. Lily Allen
40. James Morrison

The event has not been held since 2007.

== See also ==
- UK Top 40
- British Music
