= The News Huddlines =

- Genre: Sketch show
- Running time: 30 mins
- Country of origin: United Kingdom
- Language: English
- Home station: BBC Radio 2
- Hosted by: Roy Hudd
- Starring: June Whitfield; Chris Emmett; Janet Brown; Alison Steadman
- Announcer: Richard Clegg
- Produced by: Dirk Maggs; John Lloyd
- Original release: 1975 – 2001
- No. of series: 51

The News Huddlines is a BBC Radio 2 topical comedy sketch show starring Roy Hudd that ran for fifty-one series from 1975 until 2001. Each episode lasted for half an hour and consisted of topical sketches, songs and one-liners.

== Performers ==
The regular cast consisted of comedy performers Roy Hudd, June Whitfield, and Chris Emmett. The announcer was Richard Clegg, and the music was directed and performed by Peter Moss and The Huddliners, taking over from The Nic Rowley Quintet.

Hudd and Emmett were with the show since its inception and Whitfield joined the show in 1984, taking over from Alison Steadman, who in turn had replaced original cast member Janet Brown. Actress Nichola McAuliffe also appeared in this role.

For the recording on 29 October 1975, Roy Hudd was stuck abroad and could not make the recording so Ray Alan was asked at very short notice to present the show.

The show became British radio’s longest-running audience comedy in 1994 and became the second longest-running overall behind Week Ending, which ended in 1998.

== Writers ==
Many and varied writers added to the success of the show over the years. A feature of the show was its aim to let the public send in gags which they used and gave credit to those authors at the end of the show. It was hoped that this policy would help develop inexperienced writers. Major contributors included:

- Andy Hamilton
- Terry Ravenscroft
- Laurie Rowley
- David Renwick
- Marc Blakewill
- Terence Dackombe
- Paul Kerensa
- Terry Newman
- Ryan Gough
- Mark Griffiths
- Ged Parsons
- Clive Coleman
- Alan Stafford
- Richard Quick
- Jeremy Browne
- Iain Pattinson
- Sarah J Price
- D. A. Barham
- Julian Dutton
- Malcolm Needs
- Tony Hare
- Peter Hickey
- Colin Gilbert
- Nick R. Thomas
- Paul Plumb
- Gerry Goddin
- David Semple
- Simon W. Golding
- Robert Mills

== History ==
The News Huddlines was established in 1975 as Radio 2’s answer to the BBC Radio 4 current affairs sketch show Week Ending, albeit with a distinctive style, much of it involving the stage persona of lead performer Hudd.

On 8 October 1993 the show provided the Grand Final on The Generation Game with Hudd, Whitfield and Emmett all appearing. The episode was repeated on BBC 4 on 30 July 2022 as part of a series of programmes exploring Saturday night television programming.

Huddlines ended in 2001 with a Christmas special show. In January 2002, Hudd accepted the role of Archie Shuttleworth in the long-running ITV soap opera Coronation Street, and felt he could not continue in both capacities. A special reunion episode starring original cast members Chris Emmett, Nichola McAuliffe, Alison Steadman and Richard Clegg together with Jon Culshaw was recorded in front of an audience in the Sondheim Theatre in London's West End on 14th May 2023 and has since been released on CD.

== Broadcasts ==
As of November 2018, The News Huddlines has started to be repeated on BBC Radio 4 Extra, and can also be found on internet radio stations, including ROK British Comedy Channel, (under the ambiguous title "Roy Hudd shows").

== Content and style ==
The material of Huddlines was in a traditional British comedy style, usually aimed at an older audience, with every gag ending on a recognisable punchline.

Each show is loosely based around a series of ‘news items’ — usually convenient pegs on which to hang one-liners of greater or lesser topicality — and sketches about events in the week’s news.

The sketches are usually about public figures, many of whom reappear regularly and have distinctively exaggerated or fanciful characterisations. For instance, the ex-prime minister’s wife Norma Major, as voiced by Whitfield, seemed to bear an uncanny resemblance to Eth, her character in The Glums, a widely remembered segment in the 1950s series Take It From Here. Certain members of the royal family (a Huddlines staple) are likewise not copied from life, such as The Queen Mother, who was portrayed with a Cockney accent.

== See also ==
- Roy Hudd
- June Whitfield
- Radio comedy
- Week Ending
- BBC Radio 2
