= At Home with the Hardys =

- Running time: c. 30 minutes
- Home station: BBC Radio 4
- Starring: Jeremy Hardy; Kit Hollerbach; Paul B. Davies
- Directed by: David Tyler (series 3)
- Produced by: David Tyler (series 3)
- Original release: March 1987 – June 1990
- No. of episodes: 18

At Home with the Hardys was a radio programme that aired from March 1987 to June 1990.

There were 18 half-hour episodes and it was broadcast on BBC Radio 4. It starred Jeremy Hardy, Kit Hollerbach and Paul B. Davies.

Series 3 was produced and directed by David Tyler.
