= Laurie Rowley (writer) =

British writer

Laurence Peter Rowley, better known as Laurie Rowley (30 July 1941 – 16 August 2009) was an English comedy writer. He is most famous as a sketch writer, working on shows such as The Two Ronnies and Not the Nine O'Clock News, for which he wrote the "Darts" sketch, which satirised the heavy drinking habits of darts players at the time.

== Biography ==
Born in Leeds, West Riding of Yorkshire, Rowley was educated at the St Augustine's Catholic School as a child. After leaving school he had jobs as a shower fitter, a manager of a 10-pin bowling alley, a magician, a bingo caller and a shopkeeper. He turned to comedy in the 1970s, first by winning caption competitions in the satirical magazine Punch. He later attempted to become a cartoonist but was not successful. Rowley then became a comedy writer, first sending in sketches to the BBC Radio 2 comedy series The News Huddlines in 1976, and later to the BBC television sketch series The Two Ronnies.

Rowley later went on to write for another BBC sketch series, Not the Nine O'Clock News. Amongst the sketches he wrote were the "Darts" sketch, which is a satirical sketch mocking darts players of the period who were regularly seen drinking alcoholic beverages heavily on television. The sketch affected the game itself, because it caused it fall in popularity, with people believing it to be a game for drunks. As a result, professional darts organisations put in rules banning the drinking of alcohol during a match.

Rowley then went on to write sketches for other shows and people, including Alas Smith and Jones, Hale and Pace, Scotch and Wry, Spitting Image, Naked Video, A Kick Up the Eighties and Clive Anderson Talks Back. He also wrote longer pieces, including an Airplane!-like drama for Channel 5 called Hospital! in 1997, a follow-up in 2001 called Hotel!, and a sitcom starring Joanna Lumley called Dr Willoughby in 1999.

His work won Rowley several awards. In 1987 he won a Sony Radio Academy Award for his series of plays entitled Huddwinks. He also won the Rose d'Or in 1989 for his work on Hale and Pace.

At the time of his death, Rowley was working on a semi-serious book about the history of ancient Egypt, a radio play and speeches. He died of a heart attack whilst getting ready for a meal. Rowley was married to Joyce Arnold, but they later divorced. He had a son, Les and a daughter, Johanne. He has 5 grandchildren, Madeleine, Stephanie, Aoife, George and Dan.
