= Balti Kings =

British radio programme

- Running time: 30 minutes
- Country of origin: United Kingdom
- Language(s): English
- Home station: BBC Radio 4
- Starring: Anil Desai; Anthony Zaki; Kriss Dosanjh; Shiv Grewal
- Original release: January 2001 – February 2001
- No. of episodes: 6

Balti Kings was a short-lived radio programme that aired from January to February 2001. There were six half-hour episodes and it was broadcast on BBC Radio 4. It starred Anil Desai, Anthony Zaki, Kriss Dosanjh, and Shiv Grewal.
