= Ringo's Yellow Submarine =

American radio show

Ringo's Yellow Submarine was a 60-minute weekly radio show hosted by Ringo Starr, airing on the ABC Radio Network, starting from June 4, 1983, with the last show airing on November 26, 1983. The first 25 shows featured different songs, either from the Beatles days or solo days, with occasional stories from Ringo himself about one of the songs or about being a Beatle, with the 26th and final show being a call-in show.

ABC distributed the show again in the summer of 1984.
