= Barry Cryer =

British writer, comedian and actor (1935–2022)

Barry Cryer OBE
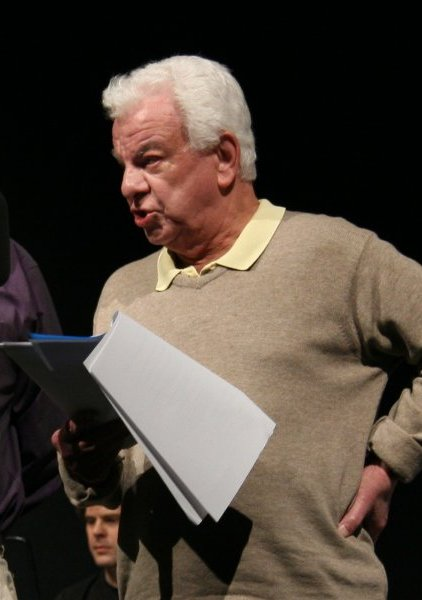
- Cryer in 2006
- Born: Barry Charles Cryer; 23 March 1935; Leeds, West Riding of Yorkshire, England
- Died: 25 January 2022 (aged 86); Harrow, London, England
- Notable work: I'm Sorry I Haven't a Clue (1972–2022)
- Spouse: Theresa Donovan (m. 1962)
- Children: 4, including Bob
- Barry Cryer's voice Recorded January 2011 from the BBC Radio 4 programme Great Lives

Barry Charles Cryer (23 March 1935 – 25 January 2022) was an English writer, comedian, and actor. As well as performing on stage, radio and television, Cryer wrote for many performers including Dave Allen, Stanley Baxter, Jack Benny, Rory Bremner, George Burns, Jasper Carrott, Tommy Cooper, Ronnie Corbett, Les Dawson, Dick Emery, Kenny Everett, Bruce Forsyth, David Frost, Bob Hope, Frankie Howerd, Richard Pryor, Spike Milligan, Mike Yarwood, The Two Ronnies and Morecambe and Wise.

== Early life ==
Barry Charles Cryer was born on 23 March 1935 in Leeds, West Riding of Yorkshire, England, to Carl Cryer, a Jewish accountant, who died when Barry was five, and his wife, Jean (née Yerker). He grew up in the Harehills area of east Leeds.

After an education at Leeds Grammar School, he began studying English literature at the University of Leeds. He later described himself as a university dropout: "I was supposed to be studying English Literature at Leeds, but I was in the bar and chasing girls and my first-year results showed it. So I'm 'BA Eng. Lit. failed' of Leeds."

== Career ==
Cryer was a writer for Leeds-based Proscenium Players, the first Jewish amateur stage group, which was founded in 1948. After appearing in the university revue, Cryer was offered a week's work at the Leeds City Varieties theatre, home of The Good Old Days, which became the longest-running television entertainment show in the world. Cryer left university after learning his first-year results and travelled to London. After impressing impresario Vivian Van Damm, Cryer began as the bottom billing act at the Windmill Theatre in London, a theatre which showed comedy acts in between nude tableau shows. Cryer suffered severely from eczema and was hospitalised 12 times in eight years. He was released from his contract by Van Damm and concluded that a performing career was not a wholly sustainable income choice because of his skin condition, so he chose to focus on writing.

Cryer joined the cast of Expresso Bongo (1957) with Susan Hampshire, Millicent Martin and Paul Scofield, during which he recorded the song "The Purple People Eater", best known in the version by Sheb Wooley. For contractual reasons, Wooley's version was never released in Scandinavia, Cryer's was, and reached number one in Finland. Cryer's first writing credits were four sketches for The Jimmy Logan Show, co-written with Douglas Camfield. Cryer became head writer with an occasional stage role for Danny La Rue's London nightclub, where he was spotted by David Frost. This led to a writing role on the variety special A Degree of Frost, which led to Cryer joining the writing team, which also included John Cleese, Graham Chapman and Marty Feldman, on The Frost Report from 1966–67. Frost used Cryer on a number of subsequent shows, which established Cryer as a comedy writer in the 1970s. Cryer is seen serving the wine in the original performance of the Four Yorkshiremen sketch on At Last the 1948 Show, first broadcast in 1967. He enjoyed a prolific partnership with Chapman, in pre-Monty Python days. They wrote about 50 television shows together, including Doctor in the House (ITV, 1969–70), and several for Ronnie Corbett: No – That's Me Over Here! (ITV, 1968–70), Now Look Here (BBC, 1971–73) and The Prince of Denmark (BBC, 1974). With other writers he contributed to The Ronnie Corbett Show (BBC, 1987) and Ronnie Corbett in Bed (BBC, 1971), and was also part of The Two Ronnies (1971–87) team.

Cryer always preferred to write in partnership, so that should he dry up he was never left to deliver material. His regular partner during the 1970s was John Junkin, and with Junkin performing as Eric Morecambe and Cryer most often the role of Ernie Wise, the pair wrote some of The Morecambe and Wise Show in its BBC period (the 1972 and 1976 Christmas shows) when regular writer Eddie Braben was unavailable. Cryer still enjoyed performing, appearing with Tim Brooke-Taylor and Junkin in the BBC radio series Hello, Cheeky!, in which the three performers bounced jokes off each other. He also appeared in the comedy television series The Steam Video Company and provided the voice of the judge in the 1975 animated comedy musical Dick Deadeye, or Duty Done. He hosted the ITV comedy panel game Jokers Wild (1969–74) and had a role in All You Need Is Cash, a 1978 spoof documentary about the Beatles parody band the Rutles, as well as a cameo as a police inspector in Kenny Everett's 1984 horror spoof Bloodbath at the House of Death.

With new comedians coming forward who wrote their own material, and age progressing and still wanting to perform, Cryer refocused his career to include more performance, touring with Willie Rushton in Two Old Farts in the Night and, after Rushton's death, That Reminds Me. After a brief early stint as chairman, Cryer was one of the panellists on the BBC radio comedy programme I'm Sorry I Haven't a Clue, which began in 1972. He also wrote and starred in You'll Have Had Your Tea with Graeme Garden.

He wrote an autobiography, You Won't Believe This But..., as well as a book of miscellaneous anecdotes, Pigs Can Fly. In 2005 he toured the UK with Barry Cryer: The First Farewell Tour, and in 2008 he toured with Colin Sell in Barry Cryer: Still Alive. He remained a popular after-dinner speaker.

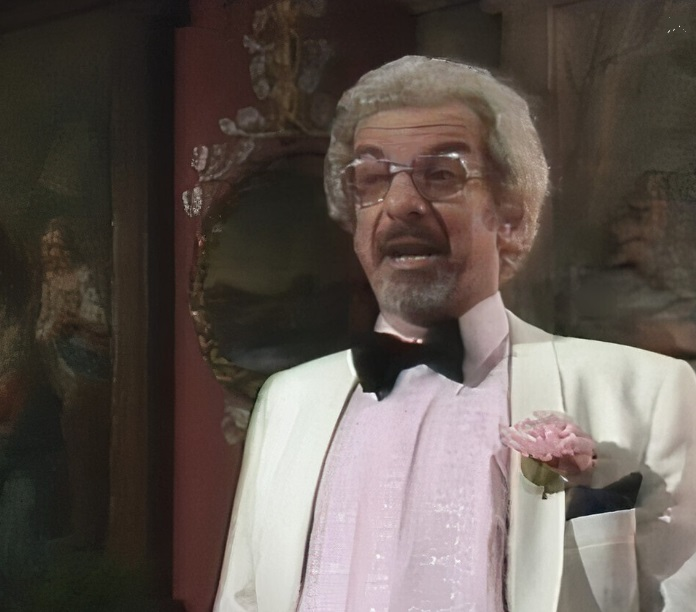
Cryer performing in The Green Tie on the Little Yellow Dog, 1983

He performed comic monologues and songs on The Green Tie on the Little Yellow Dog, which was recorded in 1982, and broadcast by Channel 4 in 1983.

In 1987 Cryer was the guest for Michael Parkinson on BBC Radio 4's Desert Island Discs where his musical choices included "Bad Penny Blues" by Humphrey Lyttelton and His Band, "The Girl Can't Help It" by Little Richard and "I Get Along Without You Very Well" by Carly Simon. He was the subject of This Is Your Life in June 1995 when he was surprised by Michael Aspel at Thames Television's Teddington Studios.

His clip show Comedy Legends with Barry Cryer, a programme paying tribute to a number of comedians such as Tommy Cooper, Frankie Howerd and Bob Hope with "comedy experts" Tony Hawks, Steve Punt and critic Stephen Armstrong giving their opinions on the stars, began airing on Sky Arts in 2018.

In 2021 Cryer was honoured with a Lifetime Achievement Award by the British Music Hall Society.

== Personal life and death ==
Cryer married Theresa Donovan, a singer and dancer known as Terry, in 1962. Interviewed by Country Life in 2021 Cryer attributed his success to his wife. In his early days as a stand-up comedian, he had been badly afflicted by eczema. After encountering Theresa in a nightclub in Piccadilly, his health improved; "I was only in hospital once more after meeting her." They had four children, including Bob, who is also an actor. They also had seven grandchildren and, at the time of Cryer's death, one great-grandchild.

He was appointed Officer of the Order of the British Empire in the 2001 Birthday Honours for services to comedy drama. In July 2013 Leeds Metropolitan University made him an honorary Doctor of Arts. In July 2017 he received an honorary Doctorate of Letters from the University of Leeds. He was a member of the entertainment charity the Grand Order of Water Rats. In the 1980s he was a supporter of the Social Democratic Party.

Cryer died from pneumonia and COVID-19 at Northwick Park Hospital in Harrow, on 25 January 2022, aged 86. He died one day before the Stand Up for Jeremy Hardy memorial event at the Eventim Apollo Hammersmith. A memorial event was held at the Moon and Sixpence pub in Hatch End, where Cryer was a regular customer, to raise funds for Macmillan Nurses and the Royal Variety Charity. At the event, a memorial mural of Cryer was unveiled by his widow, containing photos of Cryer and some of his famous jokes.

== Books ==
- You Won't Believe This But...: An Autobiography of Sorts (1996), ISBN 1-85227-682-7 (repackaged as The Chronicles of Hernia (2009), ISBN 978-0-7535-2215-8)
- Pigs Can Fly (2003), ISBN 0-7528-5991-9
- Butterfly Brain (2009), ISBN 0-297-85910-2 (also a West End show)
- Barry Cryer Comedy Scrapbook (with Philip Porter) (2009), ISBN 1-907085-04-1
- Mrs Hudson's Diaries: A View from the Landing at 221B (with Bob Cryer) (2012), The Robson Press, ISBN 1849543909
