= Nature writing =

Nonfiction or fiction prose or poetry about the natural environment, literary genre

Nature writing is nonfiction or fiction prose about the natural environment. It often draws heavily from scientific information and facts while also incorporating philosophical reflection upon various aspects of nature. Works are frequently written in the first person and include personal observations.

Nature writing encompasses a wide variety of works, ranging from those that place primary emphasis on natural history (such as field guides) to those focusing on philosophical interpretation. It includes poetry, essays of solitude or escape, as well as travel and adventure writing.

Modern-day nature writing traces its roots to works of natural history that initially gained popularity in the second half of the 18th century, and continued to do so throughout the 19th century. An important early figure in nature writing was the parson-naturalist Gilbert White (1720–1793), a pioneering English naturalist and ornithologist. He is best known for writing Natural History and Antiquities of Selborne (1789).

William Bartram (1739–1823) was another significant American pioneer naturalist who became a respected figure in literary and scientific communities after his first work was published in 1791.

== Early history ==
The tradition of clerical naturalists can be traced back to the monastic writings of the Middle Ages, although under modern-day definitions, these writings about animals and plants cannot be correctly classified as natural history. Notable early parson-naturalists were William Turner (1508–1568), John Ray (1627–1705) and William Derham (1657–1735).

Gilbert White was an English ecologist, who expressed encouragement towards an increased respect for nature. He said of the earthworm: "Earthworms, though in appearance a small and despicable link in the chain of nature, yet, if lost, would make a lamentable chasm. [...] worms seem to be the great promoters of vegetation, which would proceed but lamely without them." Along with naturalist William Markwick, White collected records of the dates of emergence of more than 400 plant and animal species in Hampshire and Sussex between 1768 and 1793. Their findings were summarized in The Natural History and Antiquities of Selborne, in which they recorded the earliest and latest dates for each event over a 25-year period. The data recorded by White and Markwick are among the earliest examples of modern phenology.

American botanist, natural historian, and explorer William Bartram traveled extensively in the Americas throughout the late 1700s, observing the native flora and fauna; His work, now known as Bartram's Travels, was published in 1791. Ephraim George Squier and Edwin Hamilton Davis, in their book, Ancient Monuments of the Mississippi Valley, name Bartram as "the first naturalist who penetrated the dense tropical forests of Florida."

Another early illustrated work of nature writing was A History of British Birds by Thomas Bewick, published in two volumes. Volume 1, "Land Birds", appeared in 1797. Volume 2, "Water Birds", appeared in 1804. The book was considered to be the first "field guide" for non-specialists. Bewick provided an accurate illustration of each species, listed the common and scientific name(s) and cited the naming authorities. Each bird is described with its distribution and behavior, often with extensive quotations from external sources or correspondents. Critics noted Bewick's skill as a naturalist as well as an engraver.

Throughout the 19th century, works of nature writing included those of American ornithologist John James Audubon (1785–1851), Charles Darwin (1809–1882) and Alfred Russel Wallace (1823–1913). Additional authors who published modern works include English author Richard Jefferies (1848-1887), American authors Susan Fenimore Cooper(1813–1894) and Henry David Thoreau (1817–1862). Other significant writers in the genre include Ralph Waldo Emerson(1803–1882), John Burroughs (1837–1931) and John Muir (1838–1914).

== 20th century to date ==
The second half of the 20th century saw a significant increase in nature writing in fiction and non-fiction in Britain. One of the earliest of these works was John Moore (1907–1967), a best-selling pioneer conservationist. Writing from the 1930s to 1960s, he was described by Sir Compton Mackenzie as the most talented writer about the countryside of his generation. Moore's contemporaries included Henry Williamson (1895–1977), best known for Tarka the Otter, whose imaginative prose won him the Hawthornden Prize in 1928. Other 20th century writers included American authors Edward Abbey (1927–1989), Aldo Leopold (1887–1948) and Indian author M. Krishnan (1912–1996).

After World War II, other writers emerged including English teacher and naturalist Margaret Hutchinson (1904–1997), who strongly advocated for raising children as naturalists from an early age. American author Rachel Carson (1907–1964) is known for Silent Spring, published in 1962. Carson heralded a new and pointed style of nature writing that carried stronger warnings of environmental loss as pesticide use in industrial agriculture became an increasing concern after World War II.

Relevant contemporary nature writers in Britain include Richard Mabey, Roger Deakin, Mark Cocker, and Oliver Rackham. Rackham's books included Ancient Woodland (1980) and The History of the Countryside (1986). Richard Mabey has been involved with radio and television programmes on nature, and his book Nature Cure, describes his experiences and recovery from depression in the context of man's relationship with landscape and nature. He has also edited and introduced editions of Richard Jefferies, Gilbert White, Flora Thompson and Peter Matthiessen. Mark Cocker has written extensively for British newspapers and magazines and his books include Birds Britannica (with Richard Mabey) (2005). and Crow Country (2007). He frequently writes about modern responses to the wild, whether found in landscape, human societies or in other species. Roger Deakin was an English writer, documentary-maker and environmentalist. In 1999, Deakin's acclaimed book Waterlog was published. Inspired in part by the short story The Swimmer by John Cheever, it describes his experiences of 'wild swimming' in Britain's rivers and lakes and advocates open access to the countryside and waterways. Deakin's book Wildwood appeared posthumously in 2007. It describes a series of journeys across the globe that Deakin made to meet people whose lives are intimately connected to trees and wood.

German contributions to nature writing include Peter Wohlleben's book The Hidden Life of Trees: What They Feel, How They Communicate. Published in 2015, it was translated from German into English and subsequently became a New York Times Bestseller. In 2017, the German book publishing company Matthes & Seitz Berlin began to grant the German Award for Nature Writing, an annual literary award for German writers who fulfill criteria within nature writing as a literary genre. It comes with a prize of 10,000 euros and an additional artist in residency grant of six weeks at the International Academy for Nature Conservation of Germany in Vilm. In 2018, the British Council offered education bursaries and workshop opportunities to six young German authors deemed to be dedicated to nature writing.

American poet Mary Oliver found inspiration for her work in nature and had a lifelong habit of solitary walks in the wild. Her poetry is characterized by wonderment at the natural environment.

== See also ==
- Ecofiction
- List of environmental books
- Nature
- Natural history
- Outdoor literature
