= Ornithological Dictionary =

Book by George Montagu

Ornithological Dictionary, or Alphabetical Synopsis of British Birds
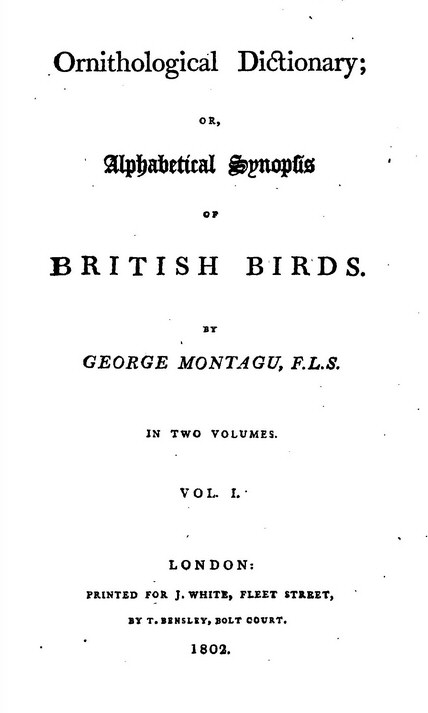
- Title page of first edition
- Author: George Montagu
- Subject: Ornithology
- Genre: Natural history
- Publisher: J. White
- Publication date: 1802
- Publication place: Great Britain
- Pages: 717 (two volumes)

The Ornithological Dictionary; or Alphabetical Synopsis of British Birds was written by the English naturalist and army officer George Montagu, and first published by J. White of Fleet Street, London in 1802.

It was one of the texts, along with Thomas Bewick's contemporaneous A History of British Birds (2 volumes, 1797 and 1804) that made ornithology popular in Britain, and, with the 1676 Ornithologia libri tres of Francis Willughby and John Ray, helped to make it the object of serious study. The book includes a description of the cirl bunting, discovered by Montagu in 1800 near his home in Kingsbridge, Devon.

The first edition was admired by biologists including Charles Darwin and David Lack.

A second edition, extensively revised by James Rennie in 1831, was panned by scientific critics.

== Context ==
The Ornithological Dictionary is George Montagu's best-known work, and the one that established his reputation as a pioneer of British ornithology. He compiled the book at his home Knowle House, near Kingsbridge in Devon. It was published soon after the first volume of Thomas Bewick's illustrated handbook, A History of British Birds, which appeared in 1797. It does not describe what is now called Montagu's harrier, which he separated from the hen harrier in 1803, after the publication of the book.

== Outline ==
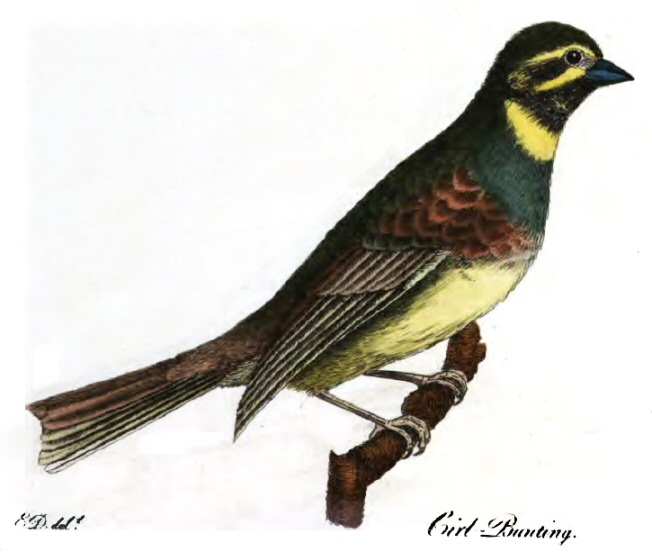
Frontispiece of 1802 edition of the Ornithological Dictionary, showing a cirl bunting. Montagu discovered the species near his home in Devon.

=== Introduction ===
George Montagu's introduction, "in hopes of advancing knowledge of the subject", mentions Thomas Pennant as being "diffuse on the subject" of ornithology, as well as Dr. Latham's General Synopsis of Birds and his Index Ornithologicus. He then introduces the anatomy of birds, separating those with a cartilaginous stomach or gizzard, and those with a membranous stomach; those that incubate their young, and the cuckoo that does not; with remarks on instincts such as carrying shell fragments away from the nest, birdsong, and feet adapted for different purposes, such as climbing or swimming. Montagu states that the "sheets have been entirely drawn from our own observations, and compiled from the notes of twenty years search and attention ... in most parts of this kingdom", mentioning woods, mountains and "barren waste", rivers and lakes.

=== Body ===
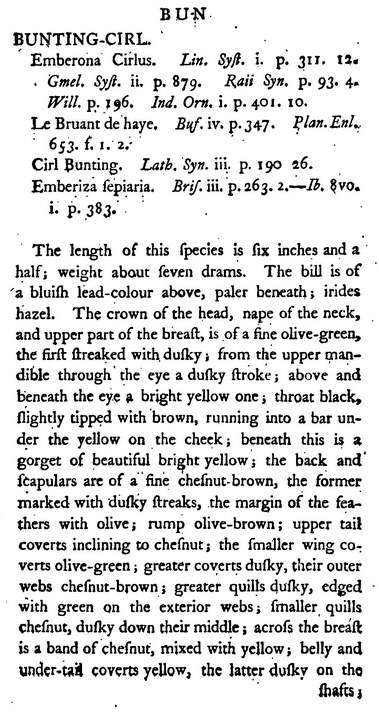
The start of the Ornithological Dictionary's article on the cirl bunting

The entire body of the book is arranged as a dictionary from Aberdevine ('Vide Siskin'.) on page 58 (the pages are however not numbered in the original (Note: Since the pages are unnumbered, the citations here use the numbering of the PDF version of the first edition at Archive.org.)) to Yelper ('Vide Avoset'.) on page 687. Since the book does not have a continuous narrative to summarise, the account here will use one species as a running example to illustrate the book's approach. The cirl bunting is chosen because it was discovered by Montagu and is associated in Britain with his home town of Kingsbridge, Devon. He also chose the species for the colour frontispiece of the book. (Note: Birds Britannica observes that in "a curious symmetry" the cirl bunting appears to have first colonised Britain near Montagu's home in Kingsbridge, Devon, most likely not long before he described it. It expanded from there across southern England in the nineteenth century. It retreated from the 1930s onwards, so that by 1989 the population survived mainly near Kingsbridge. Since then, conservation efforts have increased the population more than fivefold, but it remains almost wholly in Devon.)

The entry for the cirl bunting states that it was discovered by Montagu "in the winter of 1800" near his home in Kingsbridge, Devon. He records that the species is indigenous to Devon and "confined to the southern parts of that county contiguous to the coast", as it remains in the twentyfirst century.

Species are listed by the English form of the generic name, thus BUNTING-CIRL. Each genus thus named is listed, as

BUNTING. A genus of birds, the characters of which are, Bill strong and conic, the sides of each mandible bending inwards; a hard knob in the roof of the upper mandible.

==== Entry structure ====
The entry for each species varies in length from half a page, as for BUNTING-GREEN-HEADED (which is dismissed as "no other than an accidental variety of the female Yellow Bunting") to three pages (as for BUNTING-CIRL). The cirl bunting entry begins by citing the known authorities on the species, with the names they used for it:

BUNTING-CIRL.

Emberona Cirlus. Lin. Syst. i. p. 311. 12. ...

Le Bruant de haye. Buf. iv. p. 347. ...

Cirl Bunting. Lath. Syn. iii. p. 190 26.

Emberiza sepiaria. Bris. iii. p. 263. ...

The rest of the entry is written in continuous prose, starting with a physical description giving length, weight, and a detailed account of plumage with differences between the sexes (more than a page in the cirl bunting's case). Montagu then describes the species' distribution, nesting (nest structure, number of eggs, nesting period), differences from similar species, and other observations.

=== Appendices ===
The appendix lists two additional species of sandpiper (the little and the yellow-legged).

There follows 'A List of British Birds, systematically arranged into Ordines, Genera and Species', divided as in Thomas Bewick's A History of British Birds into Land Birds and Water Birds.

Montagu then provides an "Explanation of some Technical Terms used in Ornithology by Linnaeus and others, and in this Work". Terms range from the Cere, "the naked skin that covers the base of the bill in the Hawk kind" to "Pes compedes", "When the legs are placed so far behind as to be rendered almost useless in walking, as in the Grebes and Divers".

This is followed by a "Catalogue of the Principal Authors referred to in this Work". The authors range from Eleazar Albin to Francis Willughby.

== Editions ==
The first edition appeared in 1802. It had page numbers in the introduction (to page xlii (42 pages) but not in the main text (655 pages). It was printed in two volumes for J. White of Fleet Street, London by T. Bensley of Bolt Court, London.

A Supplement to the Ornithological dictionary, or, Synopsis of British birds was published in Exeter by S. Woolmer in 1813.

The second edition appeared in 1831, described as being "By Colonel G. Montagu, F.L.S." but "with a plan of study, and many new articles and original observations". It was fully numbered and ran to lx (60 pages of introductory matter) + 592 pages. The text was revised by the Scottish naturalist James Rennie, Montagu having died in 1815. Rennie was not an ornithologist; he had earlier published books such as Insect Architecture and Insect Transformations. The second edition was published by Hurst, Chance, and Co, of St Paul's, London. Rennie states that he has "made very considerable alterations in the arrangement". He criticises Montagu's grouping of all species of a genus together, as with "Duck-Eider, Duck-King" as "an unnecessary awkwardness, attended with no apparent advantage", and instead lists them as written. He also criticises the use of "greater" and "lesser" to distinguish two similar species, as of whitethroats, choosing to call the lesser whitethroat by "the continental name, Babillard."

== Reception ==
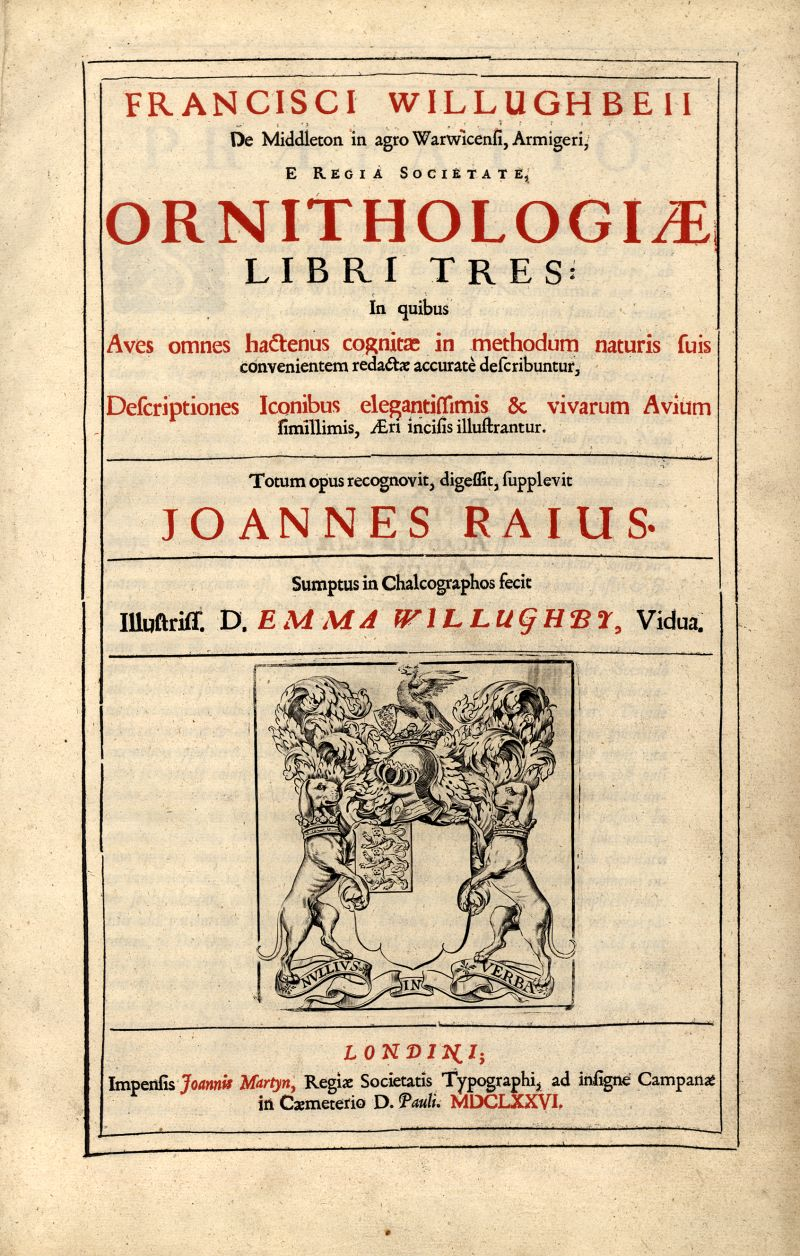
Montagu's book was considered the first major advance in British ornithology since Francis Willughby and John Ray's 1676 Ornithologia libri tres.

=== Contemporary: first edition ===
The 1829 Magazine of Natural History commented that "Montagu's Ornithological Dictionary and Bewick's Birds .. have rendered [the] department of natural history popular throughout the land [of Britain]". The botanist John Templeton is recorded in the Dictionary of National Biography to have made marginal notes in his copy of Montagu.

=== Contemporary: second edition ===
In 1831, "J. D." wrote to The Magazine of Natural History, and Journal of Zoology, Botany, Mineralogy, Geology, and Meteorology about James Rennie's second edition "to point out a few of its faults". He argued that the "Plan of study" which Rennie had added to the book was impractical, imagining the reader to have a shelf of books instead, probably, of just the one. Next, "J. D." attacked Rennie's "use of system", declaring himself disappointed, especially by Rennie's "abuse" of zoologists who were systematic. He then asks rhetorically whether anyone can identify a bird using the second edition, answering his own question with "that he can do so, no one will, I think, have the hardihood to advance" and hence that "The book, viewed in this light, appears to be a complete failure." "J. D." then gives a series of quotations to illustrate Rennie's erroneous additions, with the words "we leave the work to its merits".

Also in 1831, the ornithologist William Swainson wrote a hostile review of Rennie's edition for the Philosophical Magazine, commenting that

we were struck with the extreme assumption and arrogance of the whole style of treating his subject, which is here displayed by the author [Rennie]; with the bitterness and contempt of his vituperation of the naturalists whose views he condemns, disingenuously mingled with praise, which on his own showing must be undeserved; and with the perverse ignorance from which alone such misrepresentations as he makes on all the subjects which he touches, could have arisen.

Swainson further condemns Rennie's objections to the short-lived Quinarian system of classification, which Swainson supported. The book received similar treatment at the hands of the Eclectic and Congregational Review.

The book had some very careful readers; the ornithologist Alfred Newton noticed that Rennie had used an identical paragraph to describe two birds, the beam bird (now called the spotted flycatcher) and the pied flycatcher, though their descriptions were separated by 300 pages.

=== Later commentaries ===
Charles Darwin quoted from Montagu's account of the role of birdsong in his 1871 Selection in Relation to Sex, commenting that "Few more careful observers ever lived".

W. H. Mullens, in a 1908 issue of British Birds, argued that despite the contributions of Thomas Pennant, of Gilbert White's Natural History of Selborne (1789), and Thomas Bewick's fine wood engravings in A History of British Birds (1797–1804), ornithology had not made much progress since the seventeenth century. Instead,

it was not until the genius of George Montagu produced in 1802 the 'Ornithological Dictionary' that the work which had been begun by Willughby and Ray [with their Ornithologia libri tres], was properly continued.

The ornithologist and ethologist David Lack, writing in 1944, praises the book as "a necessary corrective to the ornate and often inaccurate works of the late eighteenth century", adding that Montagu's views on pair formation in songbirds, and the role of birdsong "are remarkably up-to-date." Lack mentions Montagu's observations of a male bird's decline in song once it had found a mate, and Montagu's experiments showing that full song returned when a male common redstart's mate was removed. Lack further wrote that

Montagu's correct interpretation of one of the most important functions of bird song did not acquire general recognition until ... over a hundred years later.

Stephen Moss evaluates Montagu's contribution as "of vital importance" to the growth of birdwatching, writing in 2005 that

To the modern birder, possessed of the latest field guide with its many hundreds of species, together with full-colour plates and distribution maps, Montagu's achievements may seem a mere footnote in ornithological history. But without him, and his Ornithological Dictionary, there is no doubt that the task of identifying and classifying Britain's breeding birds would have taken much longer.

Moss observes that Montagu cleared up many "misapprehensions and errors", enabling later ornithologists especially William MacGillivray and William Yarrell to write their "seminal avifaunas" early in the Victorian era.

Mark Cocker and Richard Mabey in their Birds Britannica note that Montagu took the association of the distribution and lifestyle of the stone curlew and the great bustard to mean that they were closely related. Montagu indeed names the stone curlew the "Thick-kneed Bustard".

== Sources ==
=== Primary ===
- Montagu, George (1802). Ornithological Dictionary; or Alphabetical Synopsis of British Birds, London: J. White.
- Montagu, George (1813). Supplement to the Ornithological Dictionary, Or Synopsis of British Birds. S. Woolmer, Exeter. p. 1.
- Montagu, George; Rennie, James. (1831). Ornithological Dictionary; or Alphabetical Synopsis of British Birds. Second Edition. London: Hurst, Chance, and Co.

=== Secondary ===
- Cocker, Mark; Mabey, Richard (2005). Birds Britannica. Chatto & Windus. ISBN 978-0-7011-6907-7.
- Mearns, Barbara; Mearns, Richard (1988). Biographies for Birdwatchers. Academic Press. ISBN 978-0-12-487422-0.
- Moss, Stephen (2005) [2004]. A Bird in the Bush: A Social History of Birdwatching. Aurum. ISBN 978-1-84513-085-5.
