= Birds Britannia =

Television series

- Genre: Natural history
- Created by: BBC
- Narrated by: Bill Paterson
- Country of origin: United Kingdom
- Original language: English
- No. of series: 1
- No. of episodes: 4

Production
- Executive producer: Neil Nightingale
- Producer: Stephen Moss
- Production location: United Kingdom
- Running time: 60 minutes

Original release
- Network: BBC Four
- Release: 3 November – 24 November 2010

Birds Britannia is a BBC four-part television series about the birds of the United Kingdom, first shown from 7 to 28 November 2010 on BBC Four. It was produced by Stephen Moss.

Each of the four, sixty-minute episodes concentrates on one kind of bird: garden birds, waterbirds, seabirds and birds of the countryside.

The series has no presenter, and is narrated by the Scottish actor Bill Paterson, with filmed interviews with a wide range of experts and bird enthusiasts, including David Attenborough, Mark Cocker, Jeremy Mynott, Tim Birkhead, Jane Fearnley-Whittingstall, Christopher Frayling, Kate Humble, Rob Lambert, Desmond Morris, David Lindo, Helen Macdonald, Andrew Motion, Tony Soper, and Bill Oddie.

In April 2011, a book of the same title by Stephen Moss was published by Collins (ISBN 978-0007413447).

== See also ==
- Birds Britannica, a book by Cocker and Richard Mabey
- List of Britannia documentaries
