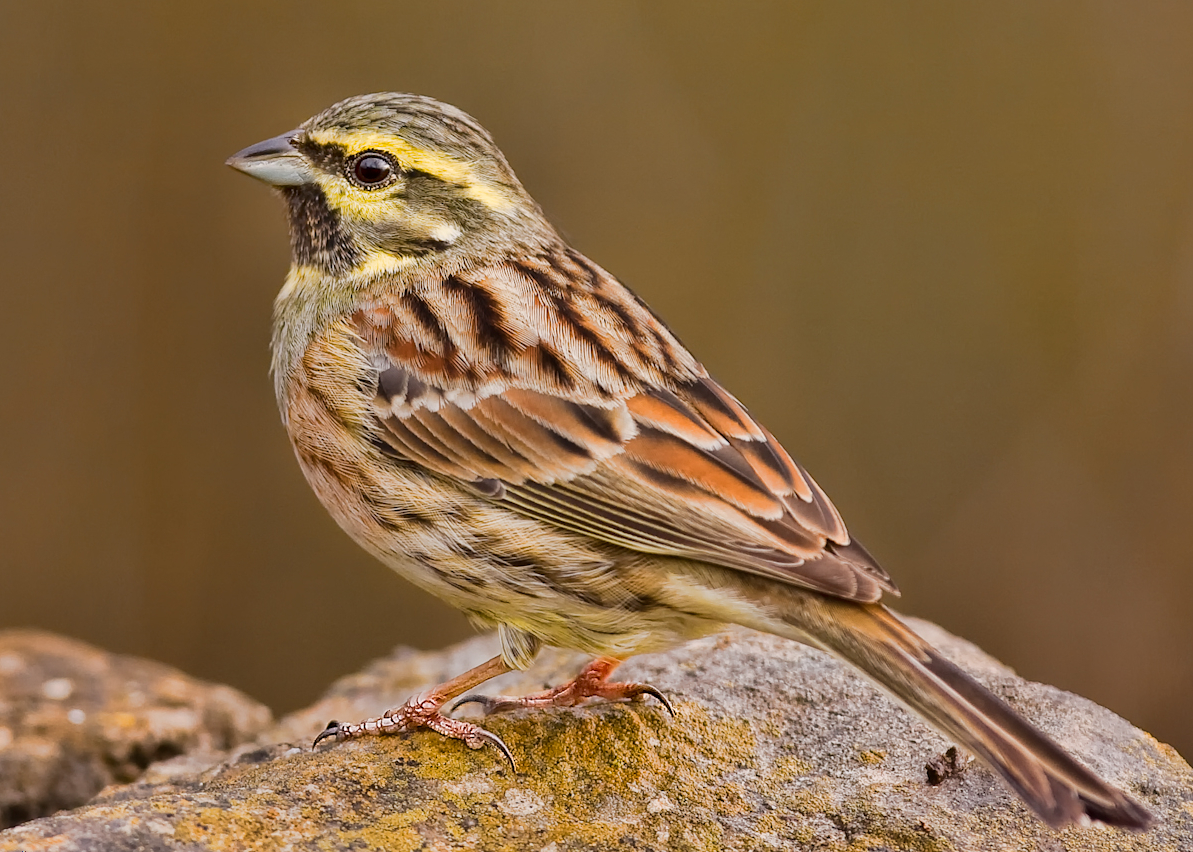
- Male
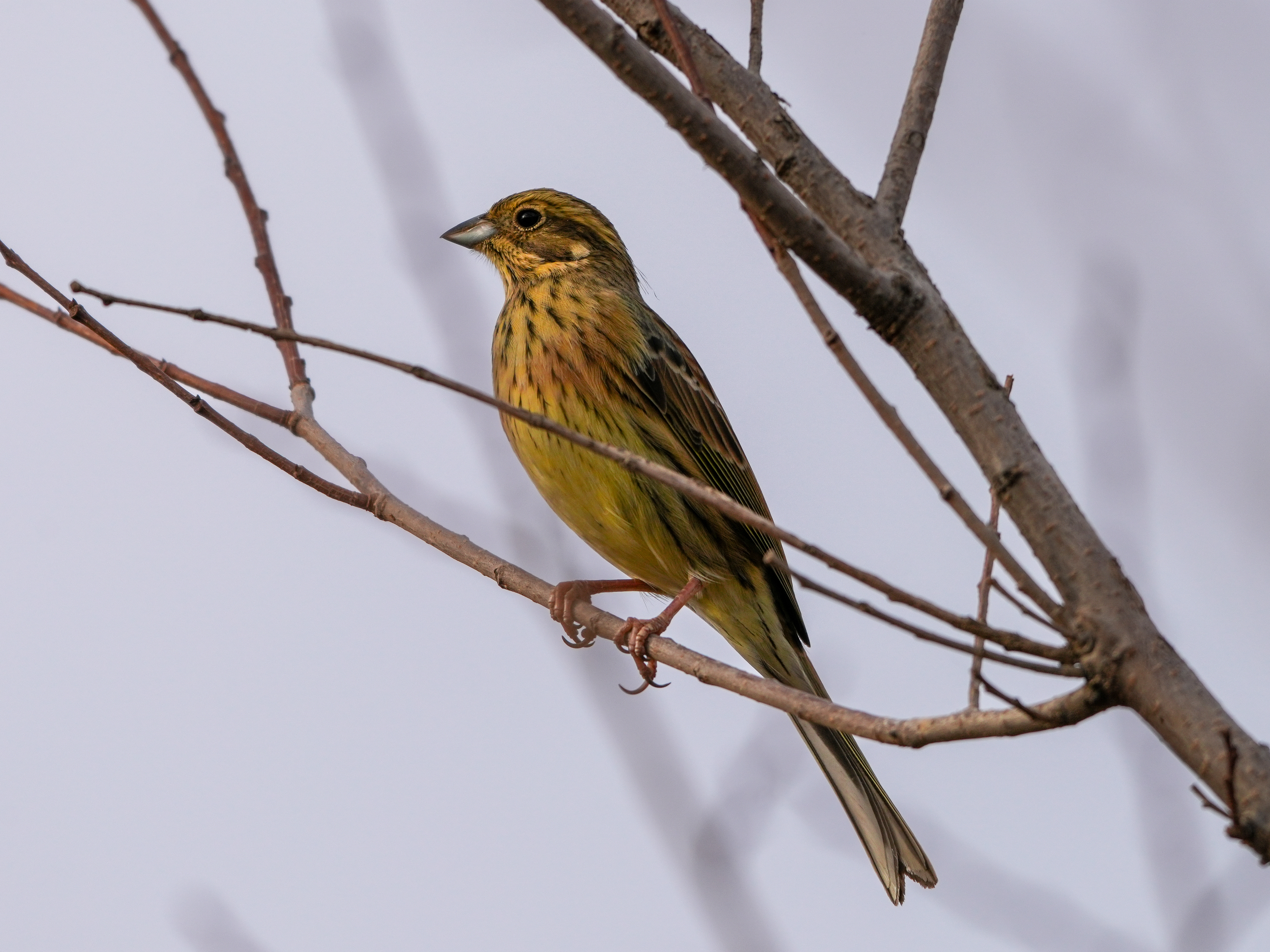
- Female Song recorded in Devon, England

Conservation status
- Least Concern (IUCN 3.1)

Scientific classification
- Kingdom: Animalia
- Phylum: Chordata
- Class: Aves
- Order: Passeriformes
- Family: Emberizidae
- Genus: Emberiza
- Species: E. cirlus

Binomial name
- Emberiza cirlus Linnaeus, 1766
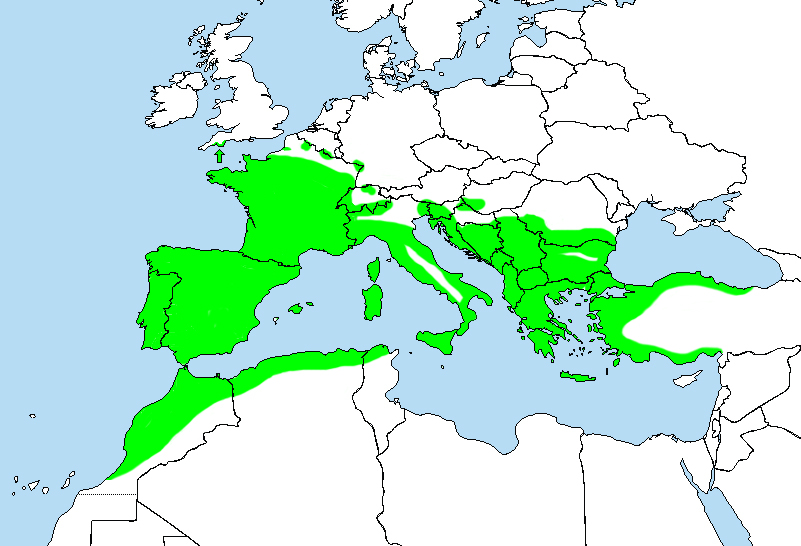
- Geographic distribution shown in green

= Cirl bunting =

Species of bird

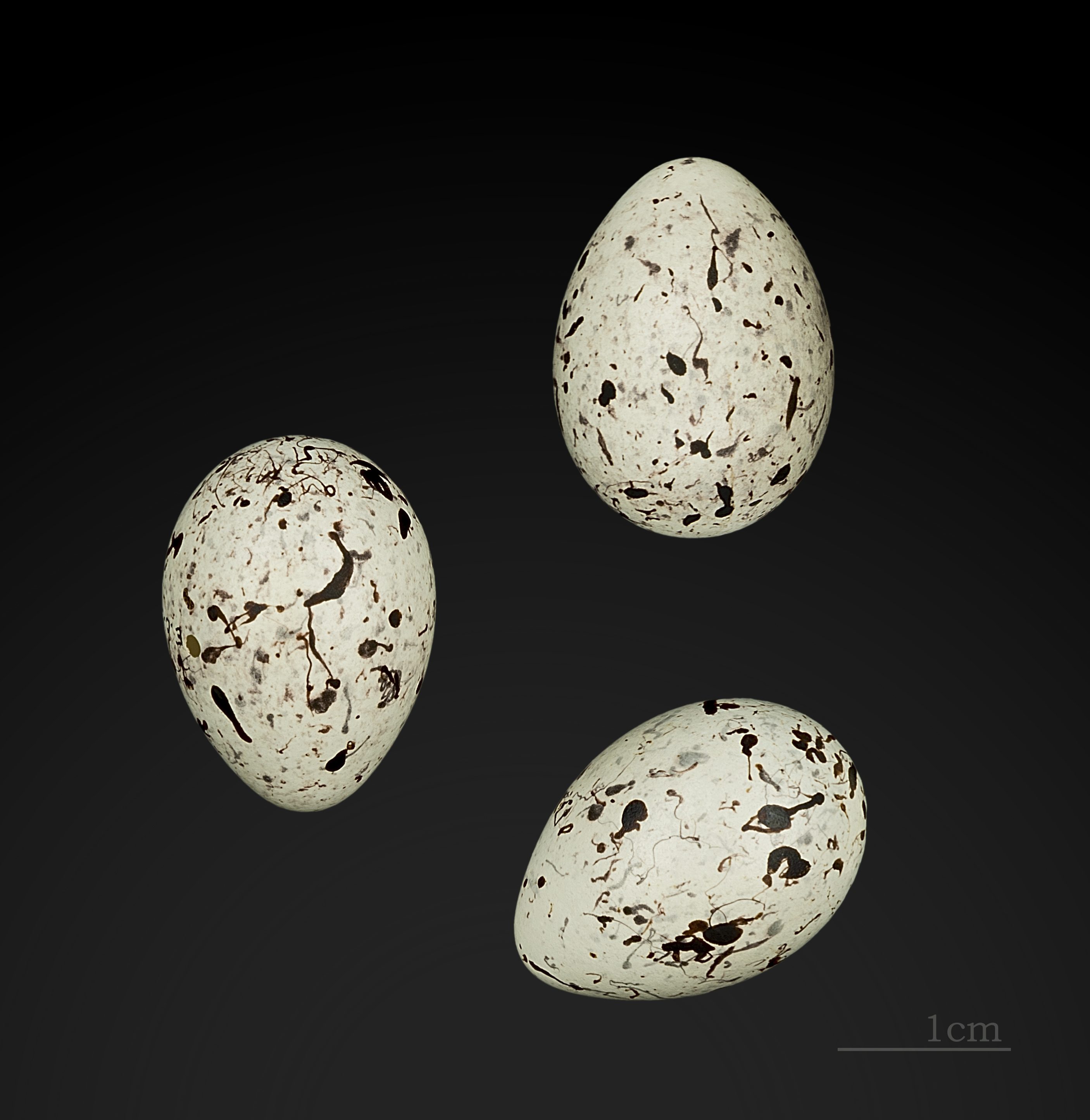
Emberiza cirlus - MHNT

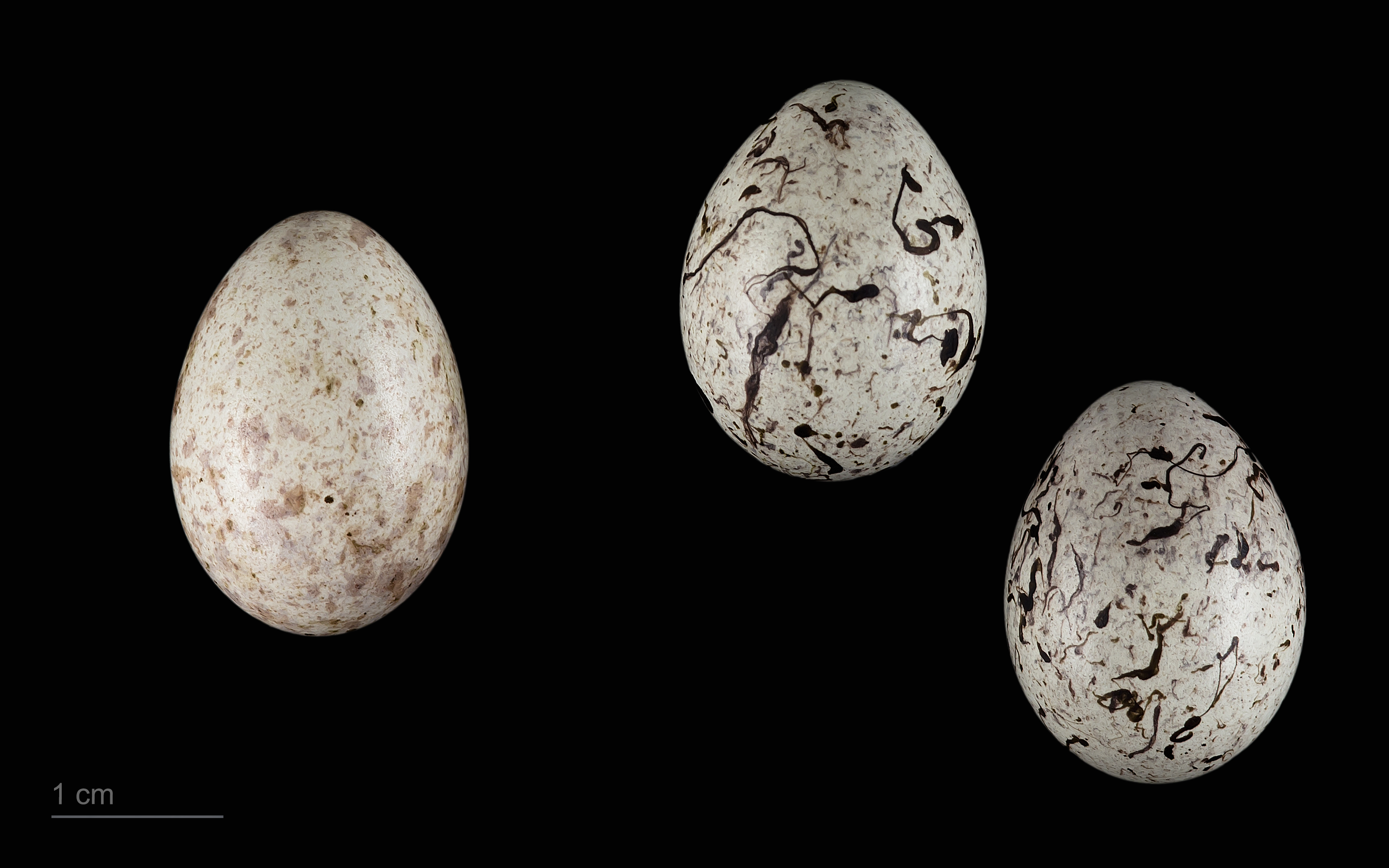
Cuculus canorus canorus in a spawn of Emberiza cirlus - MHNT

The cirl bunting (/ˈsɜːrl/ SURL) (Emberiza cirlus) is a passerine bird in the bunting family Emberizidae, a group now separated by most modern authors from the finches, Fringillidae.

It breeds across southern Europe, on the Mediterranean islands and in north Africa. It is a resident of these warmer areas, and does not migrate in winter. It is common in all sorts of open areas with some scrub or trees, but has a preference for sunny slopes. In the 19th century it was introduced to New Zealand and the persistent population remains in the South Island.

Changes in agricultural practice have affected this species very adversely at the northern fringes of its range, and in England, where it once occurred over much of the south of the country, it is now restricted to south Devon. The cirl bunting is the mascot on the signs for the village of Stokeinteignhead in Devon.

== Taxonomy ==
The cirl bunting was formally described by the Swedish naturalist Carl Linnaeus in 1766 in the twelfth edition of his Systema Naturae under its current binomial name Emberiza cirlus. The genus name Emberiza is from Old German Embritz, a bunting. The specific cirlus is from a local Italian name cirlo, for a type of bunting, from zirlare, "to chirp". The English cirl is derived from cirlus, "probably from zirlare, to whistle as a thrush". The species is monotypic: no subspecies are recognised.

== Description ==
The cirl bunting is like a small yellowhammer (Emberiza citrinella), and is around 15.5 cm (6.1 in) in length with a wing-span 22–25.5 cm (8.7–10.0 in). It has a thick seed-eater's bill. The male has a bright yellow head, with a black crown, eyestripe and throat, and a greenish breast band across its otherwise yellow underparts, and a heavily streaked brown back. The female is much more like the yellowhammer, but has a streaked grey-brown rump and chestnut shoulders.

The monotonous song of the male is a rattling trill, like the Arctic warbler or the terminal rattle of the lesser whitethroat.

== Distribution and habitat ==
The ideal farmland habitat is a mixture of grass and arable fields, divided by thick hedgerows with pockets of dense scrub. They can tolerate a certain degree of urbanisation, and are found in green spaces in towns and cities, even Rome.

They are sedentary in nature and will often travel only 250 metres (820 ft) from their nests to forage in summer, and up to 2 kilometres (1.2 mi) in winter to find stubble.

== Behavior and ecology ==
=== Breeding ===
Cirl buntings first breed when they are one year of age. The nest is at low level, within dense cover such as that provided by thick hedgerows and scrub. The ideal scrub is said to be blackthorn, hawthorn, bramble and gorse. The breeding season runs from April until mid-September, usually having two broods but occasionally three. Two to five eggs are laid, which show the hair-like markings characteristic of buntings. They are incubated only by the female and hatch 12–13 days after the last egg is laid. The young are cared for and fed by both parents. They nestlings fledge after 11–13 days but continue to be fed by their parents for a further two or three weeks.

=== Food and feeding ===
In the summer their natural food consists of invertebrates for example grasshoppers and crickets to feed their chicks. In the winter they feed on small seeds from over-wintered stubbles, fallow land, set-aside, and the over-winter feeding of stock with grain or hay. They tend to feed in flocks during the winter.

== English population ==
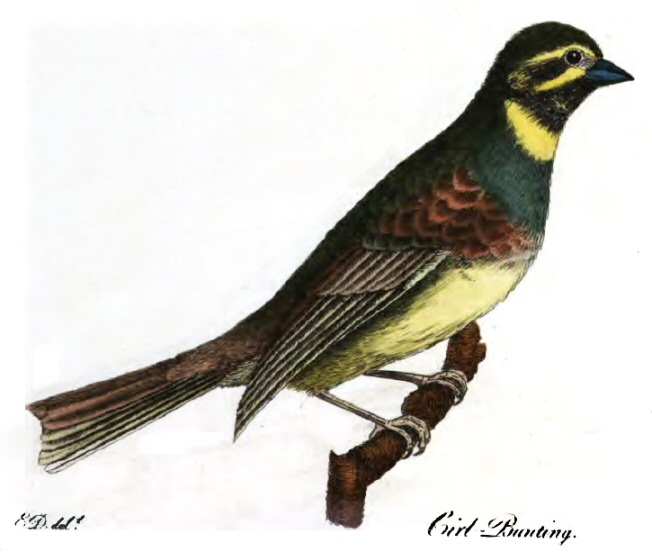
Frontispiece of the Ornithological Dictionary, 1802, showing a male cirl bunting. George Montagu discovered the species near his home in Kingsbridge, Devon, still its British stronghold.

=== History ===
A very small cirl bunting population exists in South Devon in England, near the small town of Kingsbridge where the pioneering ornithologist George Montagu discovered the species, as he recorded in his book, the Ornithological Dictionary, 1802. The species appears to have first colonised Britain near Kingsbridge, most likely not long before Montagu described it. It expanded from there across southern England in the nineteenth century. It retreated from the 1930s onwards, so that by 1989 the population again survived mainly near Kingsbridge. Since then, conservation efforts have increased the population more than fivefold, but it remains almost wholly in Devon.

=== Conservation ===
Through its Countryside Stewardship Scheme and environmental stewardship, Natural England has various options to conserve the species:

- Allow stubbles to overwinter. Leave crops such as spring barley stubble untreated (no fertiliser, pesticide, or cultivation) until the end of the following March. This allows the cirl bunting to feed over the winter on the spilt grain and seeds of broad-leaved arable weeds like fat hen, chickweed, and annual meadow grass Poa annua, which grow in the meantime. The loss of this old farming practice led to the species' decline.
- Maintain semi-improved or rough grassland and field margins, particularly tussocky grasses such as cock's-foot. These provide an overwintering habitat for insects, which in turn provides food for the cirl bunting and their chicks.
- Sow barley-based wild bird seed mix crop. This crop has an open structure, allowing birds to forage.
- Delay spraying insecticides to provide invertebrate food for as long as possible.
- Leave hedgerows untrimmed for periods of time. This provides breeding areas and food.

A partnership between Natural England and the RSPB runs the "Cirl Bunting Project", part of a larger project called "Action for Birds". Through the efforts of conservation organisations and landowners, the cirl bunting population has increased from 118 pairs in 1989 to 700 pairs in 2003. However, their range has not expanded.

== Sources ==
- Cramp, Stanley; Perrins, C.M., eds. (1994). "Emberiza cirlus Cirl Bunting". Handbook of the Birds of Europe the Middle East and North Africa. The Birds of the Western Palearctic. Vol. IX: Buntings and New World Warblers. Oxford: Oxford University Press. pp. 170–182. ISBN 978-0-19-854843-0.
