= A History of British Birds =

Natural history book by Thomas Bewick

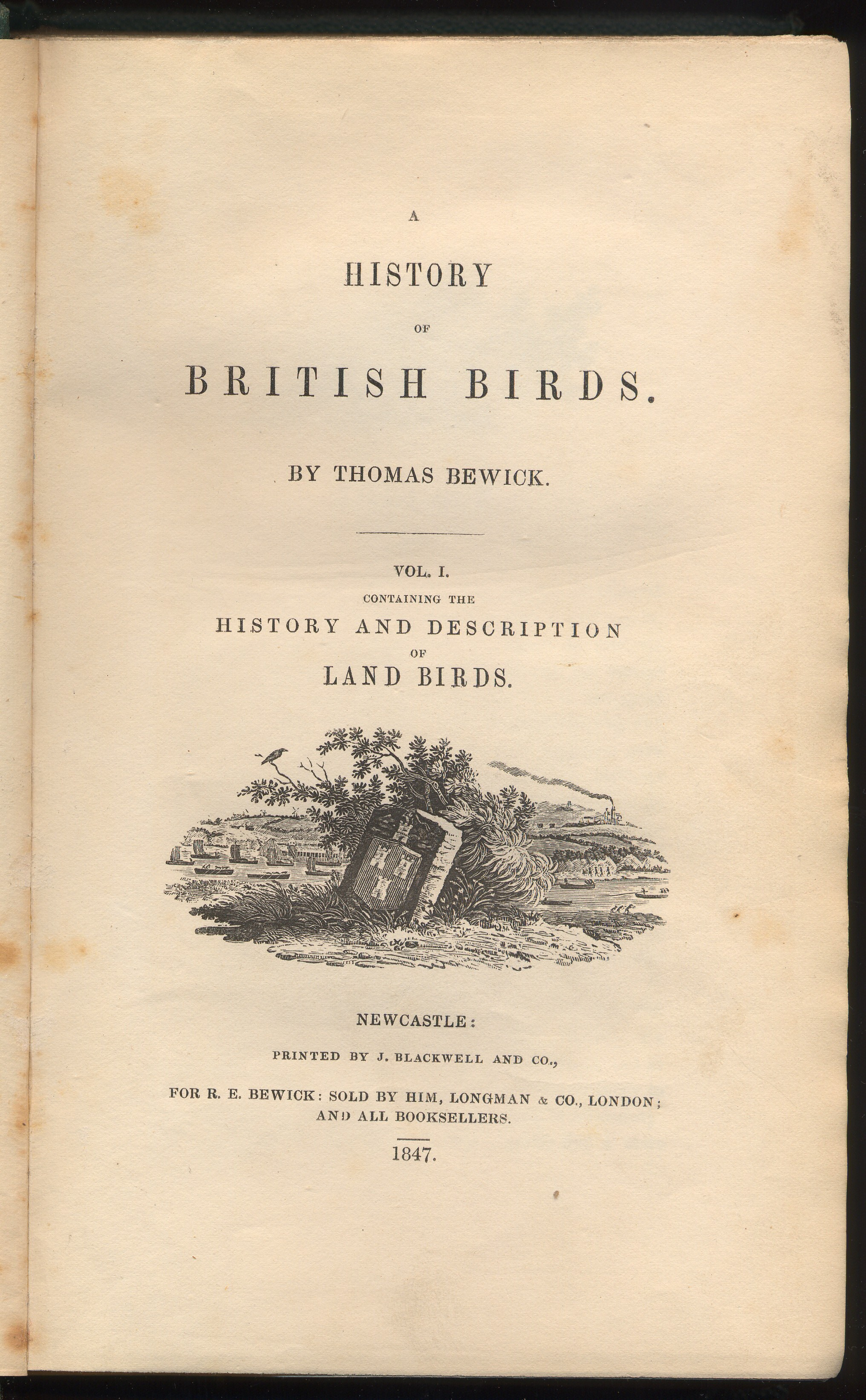
- Title-page of 1847 edition
- Author: Thomas Bewick
- Illustrator: Thomas Bewick and workshop
- Subject: Birds
- Genre: Natural history
- Published: 1797–1804 (Bewick, Longman)
- Publication place: England

A History of British Birds is a natural history book by Thomas Bewick, published in two volumes. Volume 1, Land Birds, appeared in 1797. Volume 2, Water Birds, appeared in 1804. A supplement was published in 1821. The text in Land Birds was written by Ralph Beilby, while Bewick took over the text for the second volume. The book is admired mainly for the beauty and clarity of Bewick's wood-engravings, which are widely considered his finest work, and among the finest in that medium.

British Birds has been compared to works of poetry and literature. It plays a recurring role in Charlotte Brontë's novel Jane Eyre. William Wordsworth praised Bewick in the first lines of his poem "The Two Thieves": "Oh now that the genius of Bewick were mine, And the skill which he learned on the banks of the Tyne."

The book was effectively the first "field guide" for non-specialists. Bewick provides an accurate illustration of each species, from life if possible, or from skins. The common and scientific name(s) are listed, citing the naming authorities. The bird is described, with its distribution and behaviour, often with extensive quotations from printed sources or correspondents. Those who provided skins or information are acknowledged. The species are grouped into families such as "Of the Falcon", using the limited and conflicting scientific sources of the time. The families of land birds are further grouped into birds of prey, omnivorous birds, insectivorous birds, and granivorous birds, while the families of water birds are simply listed, with related families side by side.

Each species entry begins on a new page; any spaces at the ends of entries are filled with tail-pieces, small, often humorous woodcuts of country life. British Birds remains in print, and has attracted the attention of authors such as Jenny Uglow. Critics note Bewick's skill as a naturalist as well as an engraver.

== Background ==
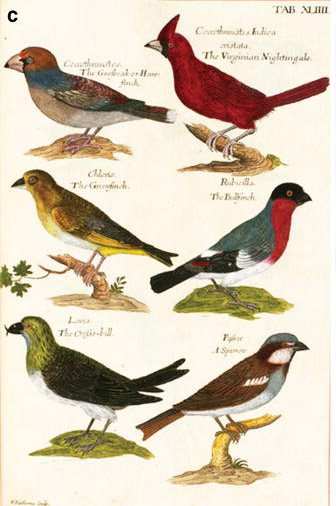
Plate XLIII from Samuel Pepys's hand-coloured copy of Francis Willughby's 1678 Ornithology

Early scientific works on birds, such as those of Conrad Gessner, Ulisse Aldrovandi and Pierre Belon, relied for much of their content on the authority of the Ancient Greek philosopher Aristotle and the teachings of the church, and included much extraneous material relating to the species, such as proverbs, references in history and literature, or its use as an emblem. The arrangement of the species was by alphabetical order in Gessner's Historia animalium, and by arbitrary criteria in most other early works. In the late 16th and early 17th centuries, Francis Bacon had advocated the advancement of knowledge through observation and experiment, and the English Royal Society and its members such as John Ray, John Wilkins and Francis Willughby sought to put the empirical method into practice, including travelling widely to collect specimens and information.

The first modern ornithology, intended to describe all the then-known birds worldwide, was produced by Ray and Willughby and published in Latin as Ornithologiae Libri Tres (Three Books of Ornithology) in 1676, and in English, as The Ornithology of Francis Willughby of Middleton, in 1678. Its innovative features were an effective classification system based on anatomical features, including the bird's beak, feet and overall size, and a dichotomous key, which helped readers to identify birds by guiding them to the page describing that group. The authors also placed an asterisk against species of which they had no first-hand knowledge, and were therefore unable to verify. The commercial success of the Ornithology is unknown, but it was historically significant, influencing writers including René Réaumur, Mathurin Jacques Brisson, Georges Cuvier and Carl Linnaeus in compiling their own works.

George Edwards was a leading British naturalist and illustrator in the 17th century. He was the librarian to the Royal College of Physicians with access to their collection of 8,000 books, and he used these, together with stuffed and live animals, to produce illustrated publications. His four-volume A Natural History of Uncommon Birds (1743–1751) and its three supplements covered more than 600 natural history topics, and his publications enabled Linnaeus to name 350 bird species, including many type specimens. When he was researching published sources for his bird project, Bewick relied particularly on Edwards' book and the multi-volume Histoire Naturelle of the French naturalist Georges-Louis Leclerc, Comte de Buffon.

== Thomas Bewick ==
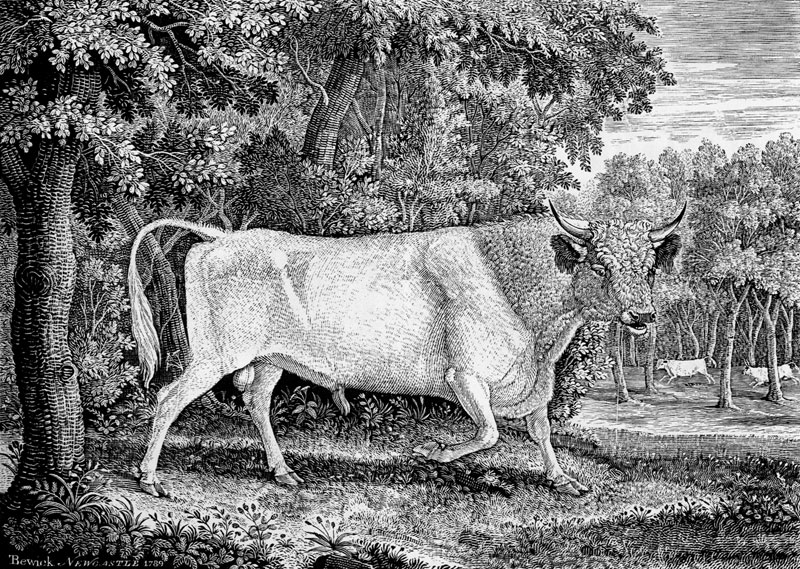
Bewick engraved a wide variety of subjects, such as this depiction of a Chillingham Bull, executed for Marmaduke Tunstall in 1789.

Thomas Bewick was born at Cherryburn, a house in the parish of Mickley, Northumberland, and he was apprenticed at the age of 14 to Ralph Beilby, an engraver in Newcastle upon Tyne, and learnt how to engrave on wood and metal.

The business prospered, becoming Newcastle's leading engraving service with an enviable reputation for high-quality work and good service. Now partners, Bielby and Bewick published their History of Quadrupeds in 1790, and its success encouraged them to consider producing a new book on British birds. In preparation for this major work, Bewick spent several years engraving the necessary wood blocks.

Bewick became well known for his engravings, including the woodcuts for Oliver Goldsmith's Traveller and The Deserted Village, for Thomas Parnell's Hermit, and for William Somervile's Chase. Perhaps the best known of his prints is The Chillingham Bull, executed on an exceptionally large woodblock for Marmaduke Tunstall, a Yorkshire landowner. Bewick also produced and illustrated several editions of Aesop's Fables throughout his creative life. His success meant that Bewick had at least 30 pupils who worked for him and Beilby as apprentices, the first of whom was his younger brother John.

Bewick died at his home on 8 November 1828. He was buried in Ovingham churchyard, beside his late wife Isabella, who had died two years earlier on 1 February 1826, and not far from his parents and his brother John.

== Approach ==
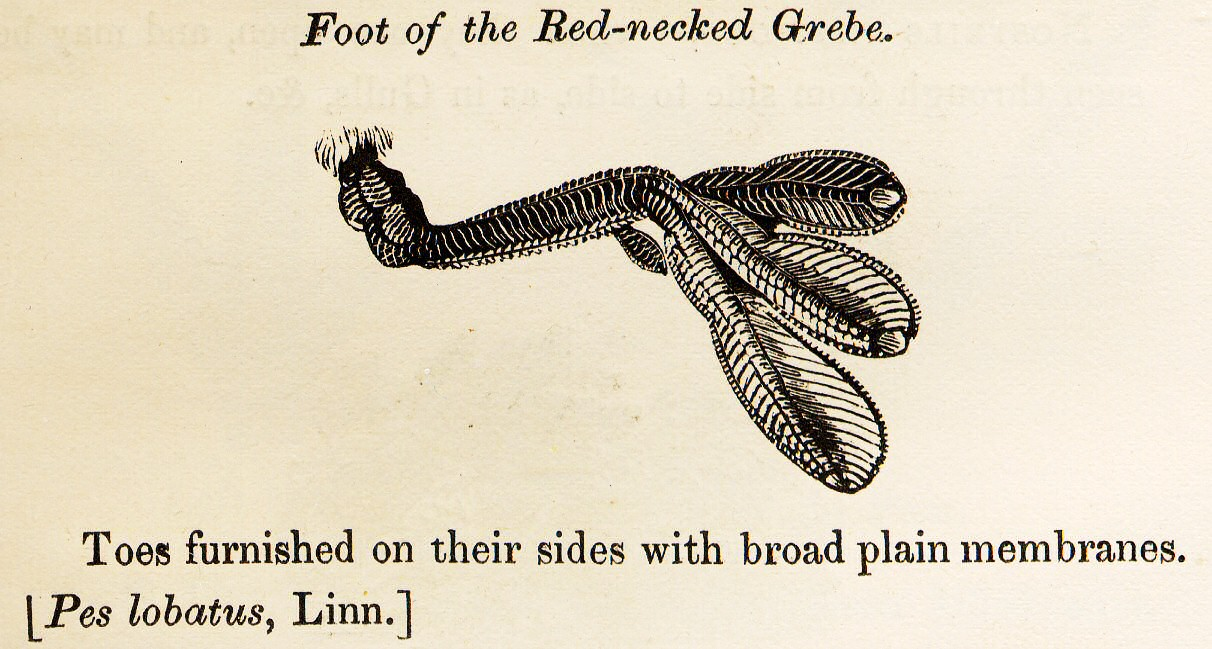
"Foot of the Red-necked Grebe"

The preface to A History of British Birds states that "while one of the editors [Bewick] of this work was engaged in preparing the cuts, which are faithfully drawn from Nature, and engraved upon wood, the compilation of the descriptions .. (of the Land Birds) was undertaken by the other [Beilby], subject, however, to the corrections of his friend, whose habits had led him to a more intimate acquaintance with this branch of Natural History", and goes on to mention that the compilation of text was the "production of those hours which could be spared from a laborious employment", namely the long hours of work engraving the minutely detailed wood printing blocks. (Note: Bewick had a "strained" relationship with Beilby, who was first his tutor, then from 1777 his business partner. They produced A General History of Quadrupeds together in 1790, but after Land Birds in 1797 and "a period of dissatisfaction" they separated.) What the preface does not say is the reason for this statement about the "editors", which was an angry stand-off between Bewick and Beilby. Beilby's original intention was to have an introduction which merely thanked Bewick for his "assistance", and a title-page naming Beilby as the sole author. Bewick's friend (and his wife's godfather) Thomas Hornby heard of this, and informed Bewick. An informal trade panel met to judge the matter, and the preface as printed was the result; Beilby's name did not appear on the title-page.

Each species of bird is presented in a few pages (generally between two and four; occasionally, as with the mallard or "Common Wild Duck", a few more). The first item is a woodcut print of the bird, always either perched or standing on the ground, even in the case of water birds – such as the smew – that (as winter visitors) do not nest in Britain, and consequently are rarely seen away from water there. Bewick then presents the name, with variations, and the Latin and French equivalents. For example, "The Musk Duck" is also named on the line below as "Cairo, Guinea, or Indian Duck", and the next line "(Anas moschata, Linn.—Le Canard Musque, Buff.)" provides the scholarly references to the giving of the Latin binomial by Linnaeus (Linn) and a French description by Buffon (Buff).

The text begins by stating the size of the bird. Bewick then describes the bird, typically in one paragraph, naming any notable features such as the colour of the eyes ("irides"), the bill, the legs, and plumage on each part of the body. Next, the origin and distribution of the species are discussed, with notes or quotations from authorities such as John Ray, Gilbert White and Buffon.

Bewick then mentions any other facts of interest about the bird; in the case of the musk duck, this concerns its "musky smell, which arises from the liquor secreted in the glands on the rump". If the bird hybridizes with other species, this is described, along with whether the hybrids are fertile ("productive").

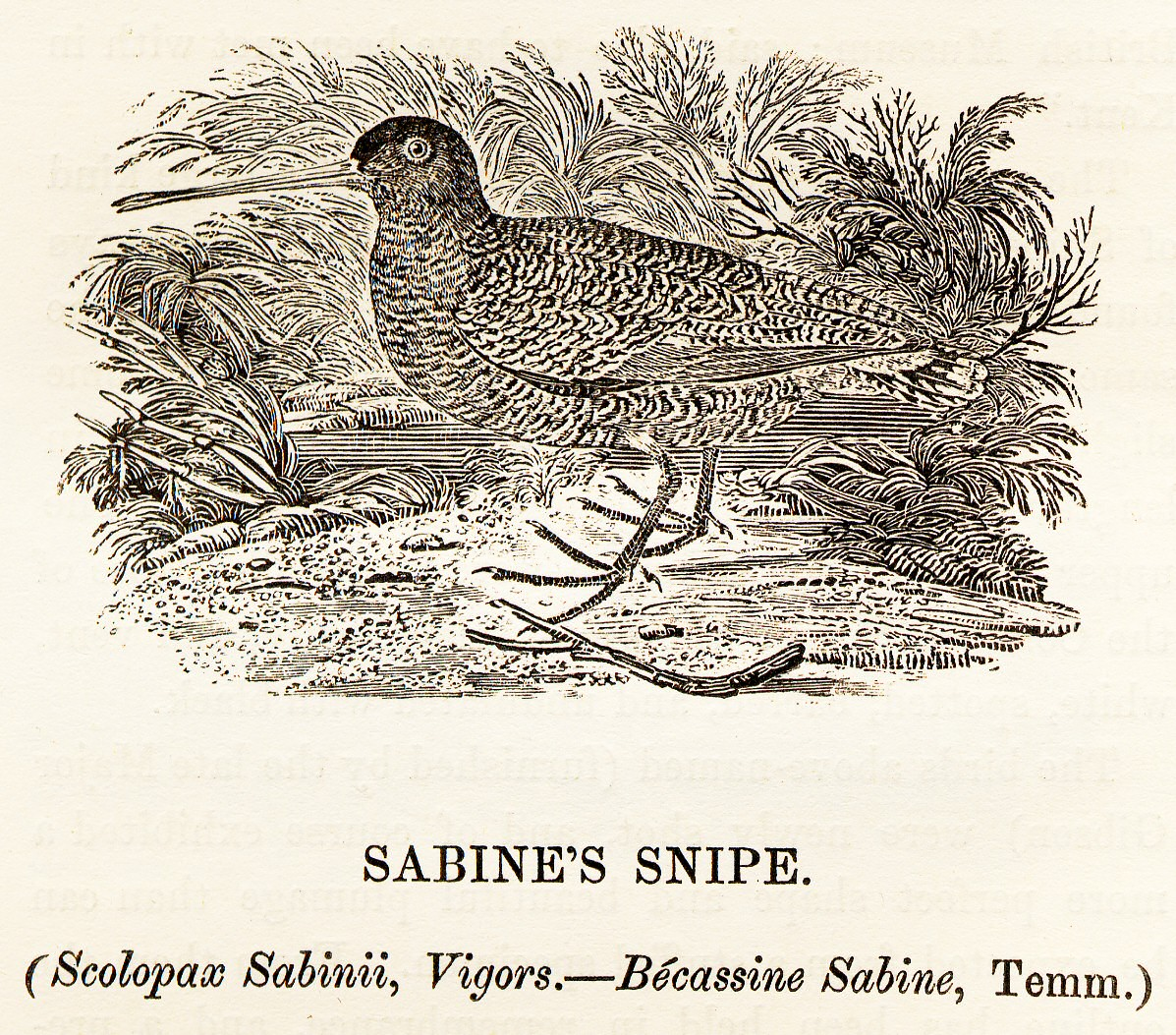
"Sabine's Snipe", added to later editions, was described by Vigors in 1825.

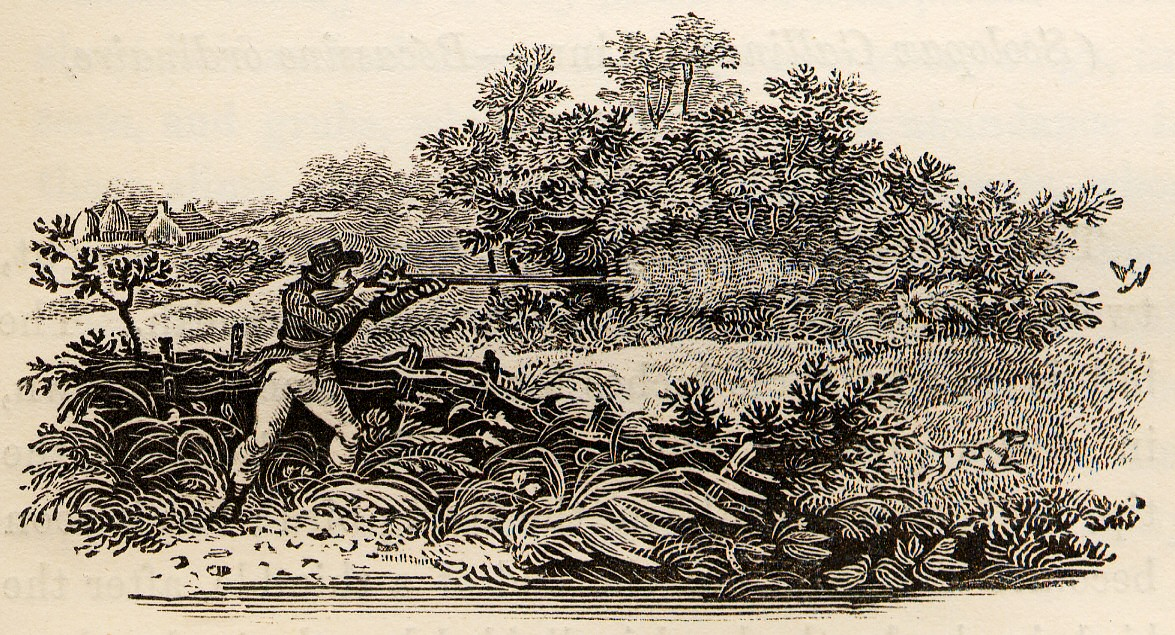
One of Bewick's uncaptioned tail-pieces, miniature woodcuts showing country life. Here, shooting from a hide, at end of "Sabine's Snipe"

Finally, Bewick acknowledges anyone who had helped him. The musk duck is stated to have been drawn from a "living specimen" which was however "excepting the head, entirely white", unlike the "general appearance" shown in the woodcut; the bird "was lent to this work by William Losh, Esq., of Point Pleasant, near Newcastle". Losh, one of Bewick's many collaborators, was a wealthy partner in Losh, Wilson and Bell, manufacturers of chemicals and iron. Many of the birds, especially the rarer species, were necessarily illustrated from skins rather than from life. For example, for the Sabine's snipe, "The author was favoured by N. A. Vigors, Esq., [who had described the supposed species] with a preserved specimen, from which the above figure is taken." (Note: The "Sabine's snipe" species described by Vigors was treated as a common snipe by Barrett-Hamilton in 1895 and by Meinertzhagen in 1926, but was thought to be probably a Wilson's snipe in 1945. The skin that Bewick worked from was presumably Vigors' type specimen; it was much darker than a typical common snipe.) In A Memoir (posthumously published in 1862), Bewick states that he intended to "stick to nature as closely as I could", but admits that he had "in several cases" to rely on the stuffed "preserved skins" of his neighbour Richard Routledge Wingate.

The grouping of species gave Bewick difficulty, as the scientific sources of the time did not agree on how to arrange the species in families, or on a sequence or grouping of those families. Bewick, for example, uses family groups like "Of the Falcon", in which he includes buzzards and sparrowhawks as well as what are now called falcons. The families of land birds are further grouped into birds of prey, omnivorous birds, insectivorous birds, and granivorous birds, while the families of water birds are simply listed, with what seemed to be related families, such as "Of the Anas" (ducks) and "Of the Mergus" (sawbill ducks), side by side.

Each account is closed with a miniature woodcut known from its position in the text as a tail-piece. These small artworks depict aspects of country life, often with humorous subjects, but all with Bewick's eye for detail, style, and precision. Some add to the illustration of the bird in question, as for example the heron, where the tail-piece shows one heron catching an eel, and another flying away. The tail-piece for Sabine's snipe, a gamebird, shows a hunter firing, and a small bird falling to the ground. There is no exclusion of human life from the images: one tail-piece depicts a works complete with smoking chimney beside a river. (Note: Bewick made dozens of woodcuts for coal certificates for collieries near Newcastle, in what is now Tyne and Wear. These depict buildings such as the Custom House with its smoking chimneys, and one woodcut is boldly headed 'NEWCASTLE'.)

== Outline ==
=== Land birds ===
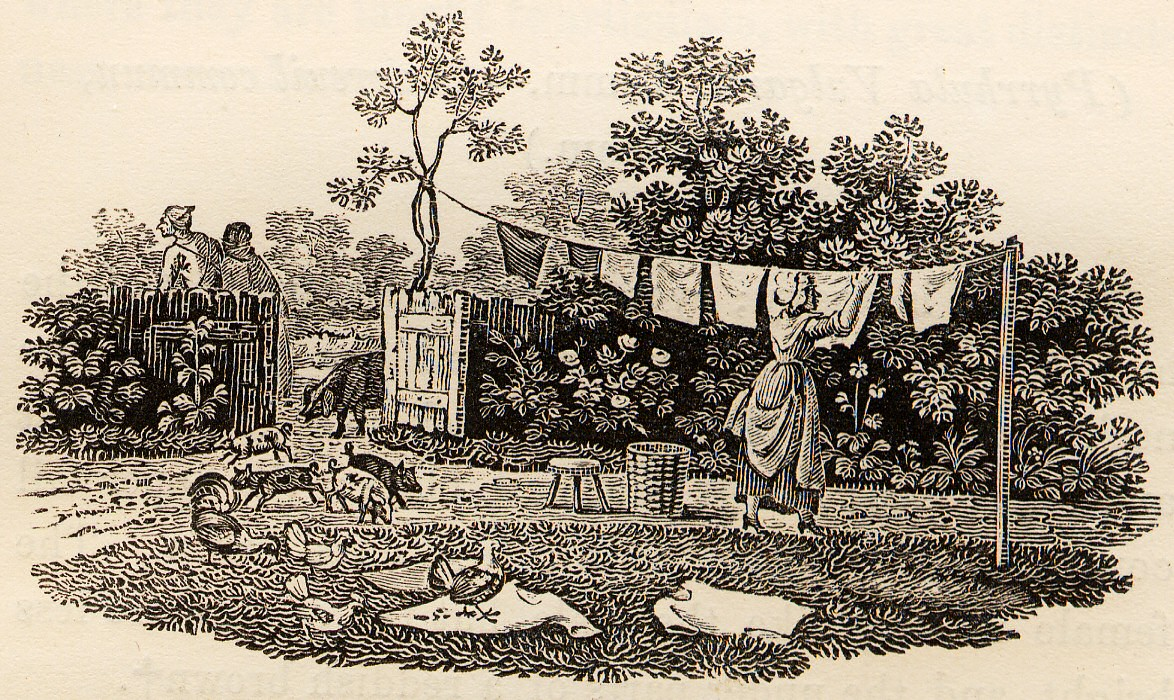
Hanging washing with pigs and chickens: an uncaptioned tail-piece in Volume 1: Land Birds. Like many others, this has a humorous touch, with a bird leaving muddy footprints on a newly laundered shirt.

The first volume "containing the History and Description of Land Birds" begins with a preface, an introduction, and a list of technical terms illustrated with Bewick's woodcuts. The introduction begins:

In no part of the animal creation are the wisdom, the goodness, and the bounty of Providence displayed in a more lively manner than in the structure, formation, and various endowments of the feathered tribes.

The birds are divided into granivorous (grain eating) and carnivorous groups, which are explained in some detail. The speed, senses, flight, migration, pairing behaviour and feeding of birds are then discussed, with observations from Spallanzani and Gilbert White, whose Natural History and Antiquities of Selborne was published in 1789. The pleasure of watching birds is mentioned:

To the practical ornithologist there arises a considerable gratification in being able to ascertain the distinguishing characters of birds as they appear at a distance, whether at rest, or during their flight; for not only every genus has something peculiar to itself, but each species has its own appropriate marks, by which a judicious observer may discriminate almost with certainty.

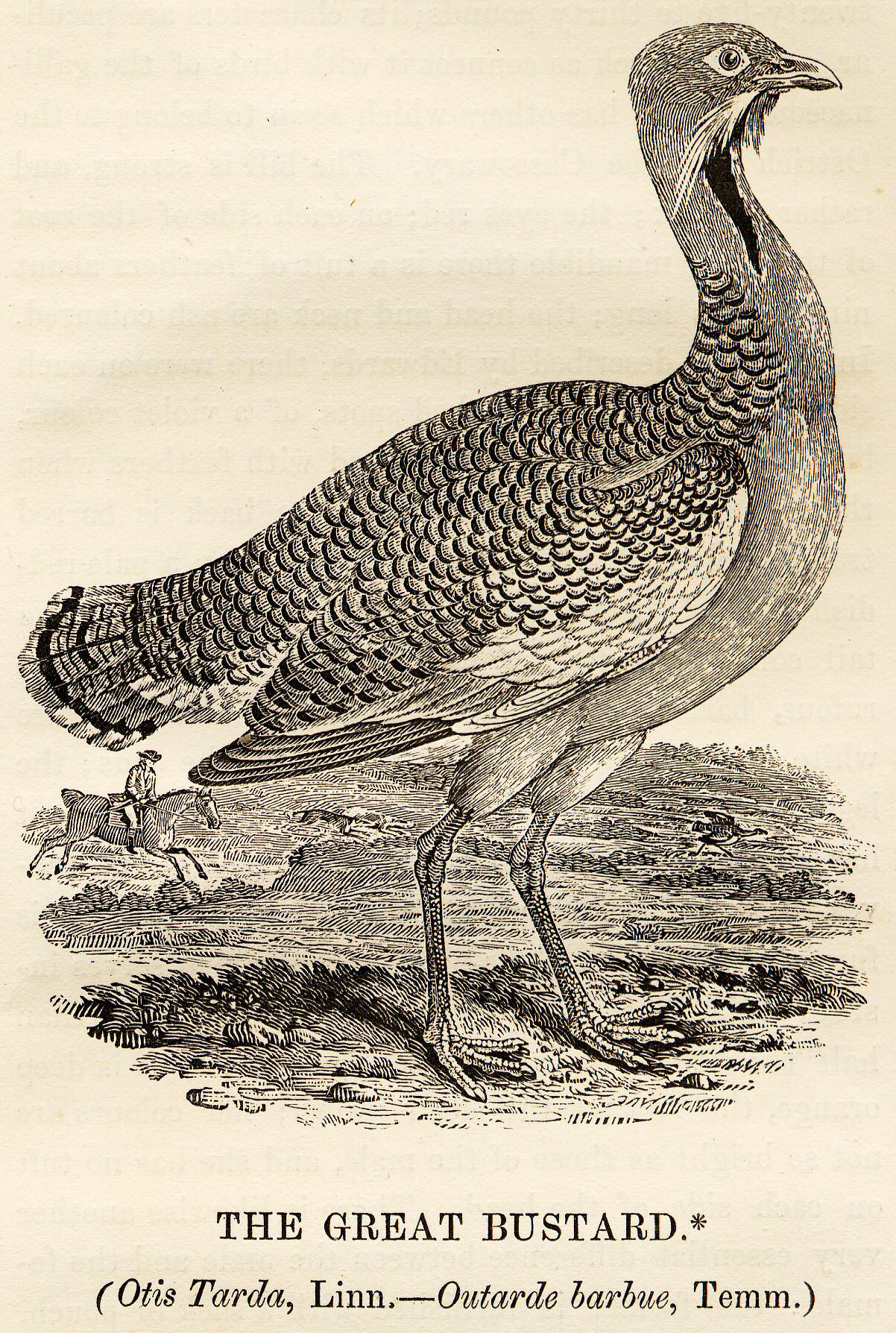
Woodcut of "The Great Bustard". A horseman and pair of greyhounds gallop after another bustard in the background.

Bewick also mentions conservation, in the context of the probable local extinction of a valuable resource:

"Both this and the Great Bustard are excellent eating, and would well repay the trouble of domestication; indeed, it seems surprising, that we should suffer these fine birds to be in danger of total extinction, (Note: Bewick's prediction was correct. The great bustard became extinct in Britain in the 1830s.) although, if properly cultivated, they might afford as excellent a repast as our own domestic poultry, or even as the Turkey, for which we are indebted to distant countries."

The 1847 edition, revised with additional woodcuts and descriptions, is organized as follows, with the species grouped into families such as the shrikes:

- Birds of Prey
  - Of the Falcon [includes buzzard, sparrowhawk]
  - Of the Owl
- Omnivorous Birds
- Insectivorous Birds
  - Of the Shrike
  - Of the Flycatchers
  - Of the Warblers
  - Of the Wagtail
- Granivorous Birds
  - Of the Lark
  - Of the Titmouse
  - Of the Bunting
  - Of the Finch
  - Of the Woodpecker
  - Of the Swallow
  - Of the Gallinaceous kind [gamebirds]
  - Of the Grouse
  - Of the Bustard

=== Water birds ===
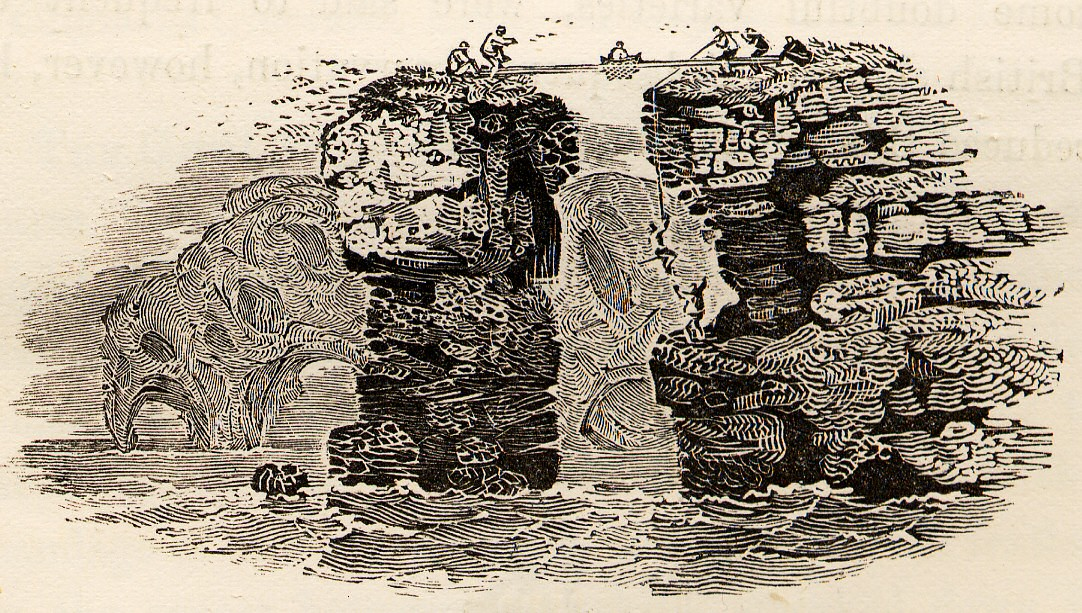
Bird's eggs from sea-cliffs: uncaptioned tail-piece in Volume 2: Water Birds. Bewick has chosen a seabird theme, but humans are closely involved, and the birds are a useful resource.

The second volume "containing the History and Description of Water Birds" begins with its own preface, and its own introduction. Bewick discusses the question of where many seabirds go to breed, revisits the subject of migration, and concludes with reflections on "an all-wise Providence" as shown in Nature.

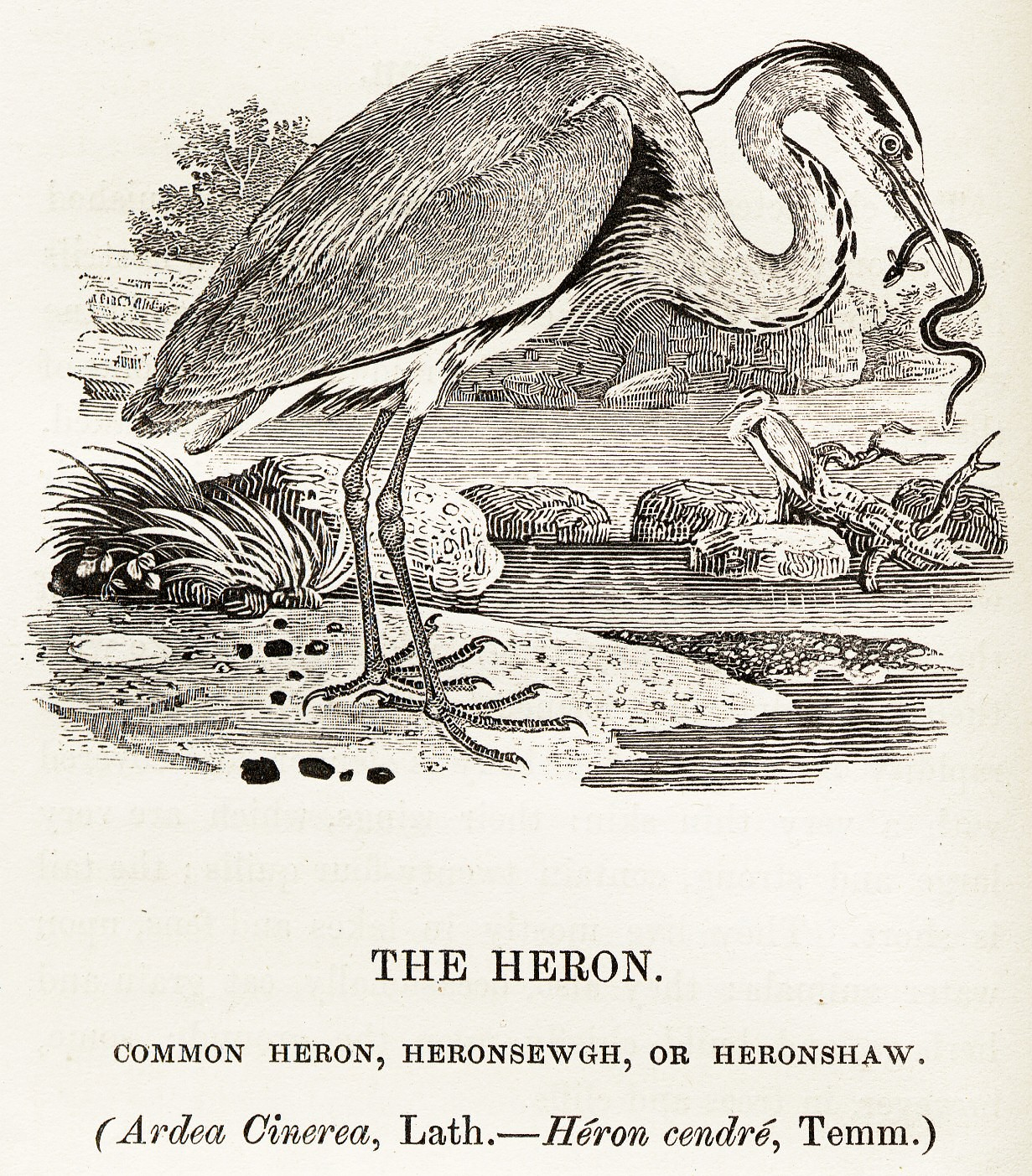
"The Heron. Common Heron, Heronsewgh, or Heronshaw. (Ardea cinerea, Lath.—Héron cendré, Temm.)" woodcut

The 1847 edition is organized as follows: (Note: Some of the species in the book appear without any section heading.)

- Of the Oyster Catcher
- Of the Plover
- Of the Heron
- Of the Avoset [one species]
- Of the Spoonbill [one species]
- Of the Ibis [one species]
- Of the Curlew
- Of the Sandpiper
- Of the Godwit
- Of the Snipe
- Of the Rail
- Of the Gallinule
- Of the Coot
- Of the Phalarope
- Of the Grebes
- Of the Terns
- Of the Gull
- Of the Predatory Gulls [the skuas]
- Of the Petrel
- Of the Anas [ducks, geese and swans]
- Of the Mergus [sawbill ducks]
- Of the Cormorant
- Of the Gannet [one species]
- Of the Divers
- Of the Guillemot
- Of the Auk

Foreign Birds

The 'foreign birds' are not grouped but just listed directly as species, from Bearded Vulture to Mino. Fifteen birds are included, with no description, and despite their placement in the table of contents, they appear at the front of the volume as an 'Appendix'.

== Reception ==
Bewick's Birds was an immediate best-seller. When Land Birds appeared, the whole print sold out by the middle of 1798; 1000 copies of the demy size (8 3/4 in × 5 5/8 in, 220 mm × 140 mm), 850 of the royal octavo (10 in × 6 1/4 in, 250 mm × 160 mm), and 24 of the grand imperial (22 in × 30 in, 560 mm × 760 mm).

=== Contemporary ===
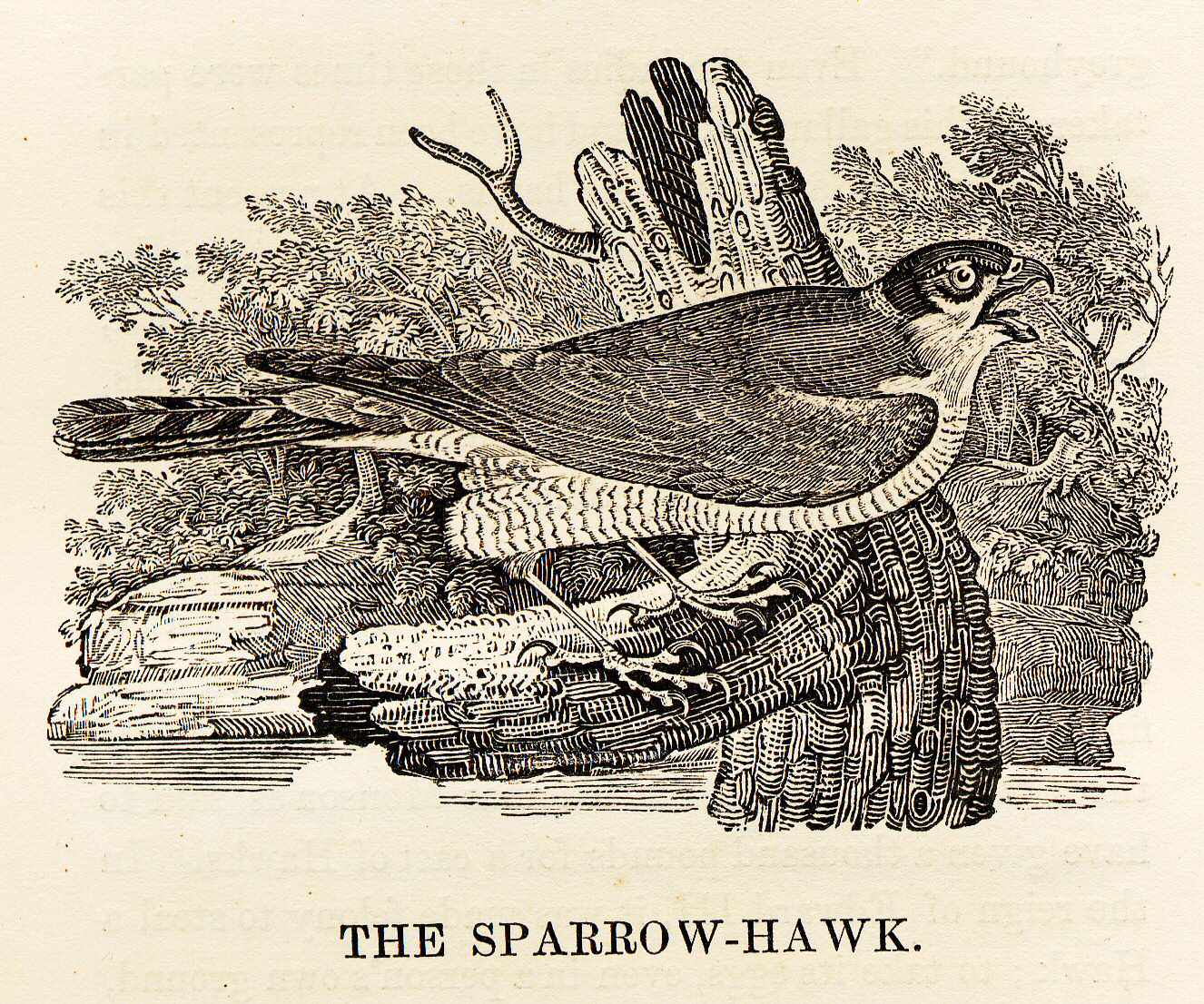
"The Sparrow-Hawk" shows textures Bewick achieved with engraving tools on the end-grain of hard boxwood.

In 1805, the British Critic wrote that it was "superfluous to expatiate much on the merits of a work" that everyone liked because of "the aptness of its descriptions, the accuracy of its figures, the spirit of its wood engravings, and the ingenious variety of its vignettes."

The 1829 Magazine of Natural History commented that "Montagu's Ornithological Dictionary and Bewick's Birds .. have rendered [the] department of natural history popular throughout the land".

Ibis, reviewing the Memoir of Thomas Bewick, written by himself in 1862, compares the effect of Bewick and Gilbert White, writing "It was the pages of Gilbert White and the woodcuts of Bewick which first beguiled the English schoolboy to the observation of our feathered friends", and "how few of our living naturalists but must gratefully acknowledge their early debt to White's 'History' and to the life-like woodcuts of Bewick!" The reviewer judges that "Probably we shall not wrong the cultivated annalist of Selborne by giving the first place to Bewick." However, comparing them as people, "Bewick has not the slightest claim to rank with Gilbert White as a naturalist. White was what Bewick never was, a man of science; but, if no naturalist, Bewick was a lover of nature, a careful observer, and a faithful copier of her ever-varying forms. In this, and in this alone, lies his charm."

The 1911 Encyclopædia Britannica's entry on Thomas Bewick describes "the British Birds" as "his great achievement, that with which his name is inseparably associated", observing that "Bewick, from his intimate knowledge of the habits of animals acquired during his constant excursions into the country, was thoroughly qualified to do justice to this great task."

=== Modern ===
John Brewer, writing in the London Review of Books, says that for his Birds, "Bewick had acquired national renown as the artist who most truthfully depicted the flora and fauna of the British countryside." He adds that "Bewick's achievement was both technical and aesthetic." In his view, Bewick "reconciled nature, science and art. His engravings of British birds, which represent his work at its finest, are almost all rendered with the precision of the ornithologist: but they also portray the animals in their natural habitat – the grouse shelters in his covert, the green woodpecker perches on a gnarled branch, waders strut by streams ..." He observes that "Most of the best engravings include a figure, incident or building which draws the viewer's eye beyond and behind the animal profile in the foreground. Thus the ploughboy in the distant field pulls our gaze past the yellow wagtail ..."

British Birds, reviewing a "lavishly illustrated" British Library book on Bewick, writes that "No ornithologist will ever regard Thomas Bewick, known primarily for The History of British Birds (1797–1804), as a naturalist of the same standing as contemporaries such as Edward Donovan, John Latham and James Bolton", noting however that Bewick helped to define "a certain English Romantic sensibility". More directly, the review notes that "Bewick was aware that his role was to offer a modest guide to birds that the common man not only could afford but would also want to possess." Bewick was not "a scientist, but he was a perfectionist". The book's text was written by "failed author" Ralph Beilby, but the text is "almost extraneous" given Bewick's masterpiece.

The Tate Gallery writes that Bewick's " best illustrations ... are in his natural history books. The History of British Birds (2 vols, Newcastle upon Tyne, 1797–1804) reveals Bewick's gifts as a naturalist as well as an engraver (the artist was responsible for the text as well as the illustrations in the second volume)." The article notes that the book makes "extensive use of narrative tailpieces: vignettes in which manifold aspects of north-country life are expressed with affection, humour and a genuine love of nature. In later years these miniature scenes came to be more highly regarded than the figures they accompany."

Dissenting from the general tone of praise for Bewick, Jacob Kainen cites claims that "many of the best tailpieces in the History of British birds were drawn by Robert Johnson", and that "the greater number of those contained in the second volume were engraved by Clennell. Granted that the outlook and the engraving style were Bewick's, and that these were notable contributions, the fact that the results were so close to his own points more to an effective method of illustration than to the outpourings of genius." Kainen argues that while competent, Bewick "was no Holbein, no Botticelli—it is absurd to think of him in such terms—but he did develop a fresh method of handling wood engraving."

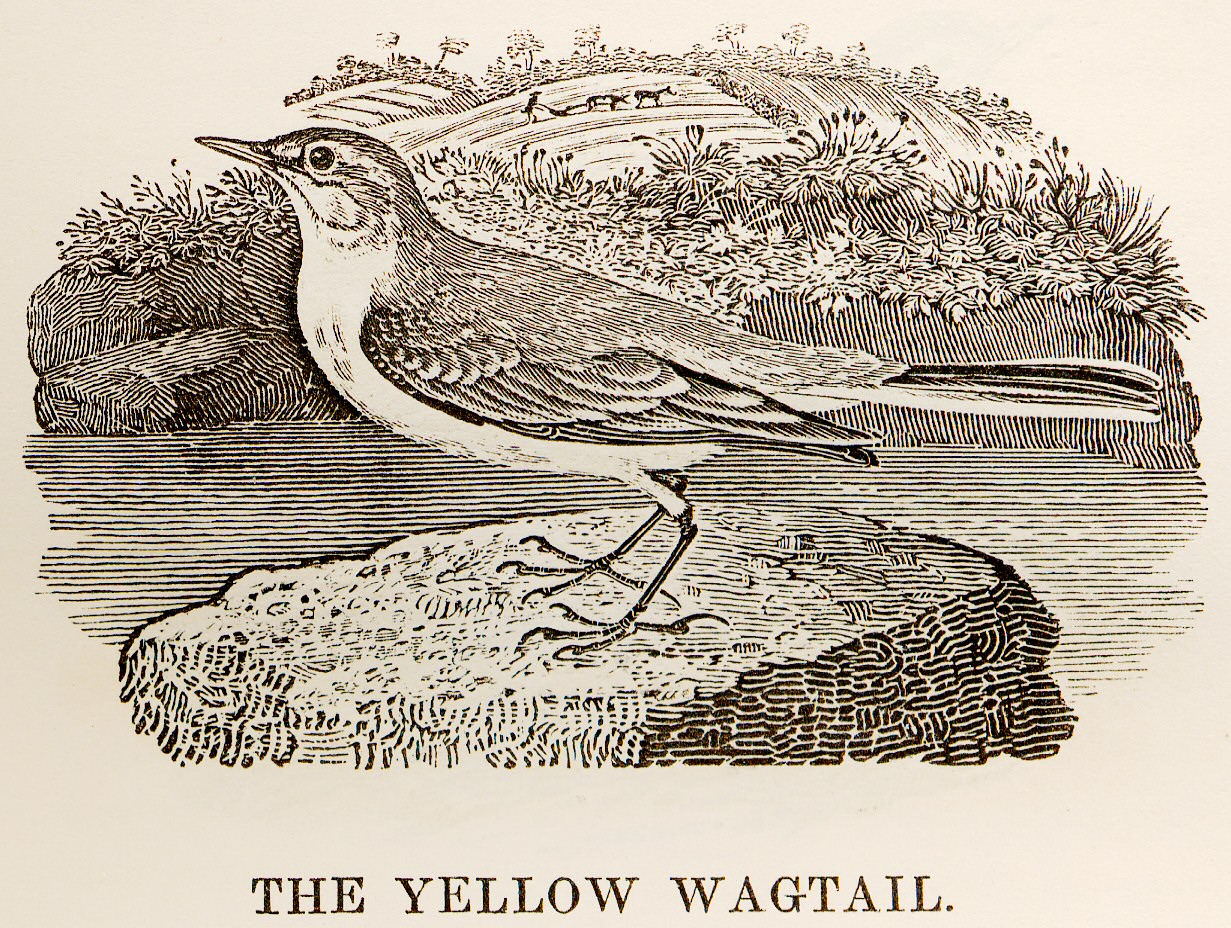
Bewick's woodcut of "The Yellow Wagtail" shows the bird in its habitat by fresh water, with a detailed illustration including figures in the background.

The Linnean Society writes that the History "shows that he was also an excellent naturalist, a meticulous observer of birds and animals in their habitats."

The University of Maryland writes that "The Birds is specific to those species indigenous to Britain and is incredibly accurate due to Bewick's personal knowledge of the habits of birds in the wild acquired during his frequent bird-watching expeditions." It adds that "Bewick's woodcarvings are considered a pinnacle example of the medium."

Jenny Uglow, writing in The Guardian, notes that "An added delight was the way he filled the blank spaces with 'tail-pieces', tiny, witty, vivid scenes of ordinary life." She describes the importance of Birds in Jane Eyre, and ends "He worked with precision and insight, in a way that we associate with poets such as Clare and Wordsworth, Gerard Manley Hopkins and Elizabeth Bishop. To Bewick, nature was the source of joy, challenge and perpetual consolation. In his woodcuts of birds and animals as well as his brilliant tail-pieces, we can still feel this today." However, in her biography of Bewick, she adds that "The country might be beautiful but it also stank: in his vignettes men relieve themselves in hedges and ruins, a woman holds her nose as she walks between the cowpats, and a farmyard privy shows that men are as filthy as the pigs they despise."

Hilary Spurling, reviewing Uglow's biography of Bewick in The Observer, writes that when Birds appeared, people all over Britain "became his pupils". Spurling cites Charles Kingsley's story of his father's hunting friends from the New Forest mocking him for buying "a book 'about dicky-birds", until, astonished, they saw the book and discovered "things they had known all their lives and never even noticed".

== In culture ==
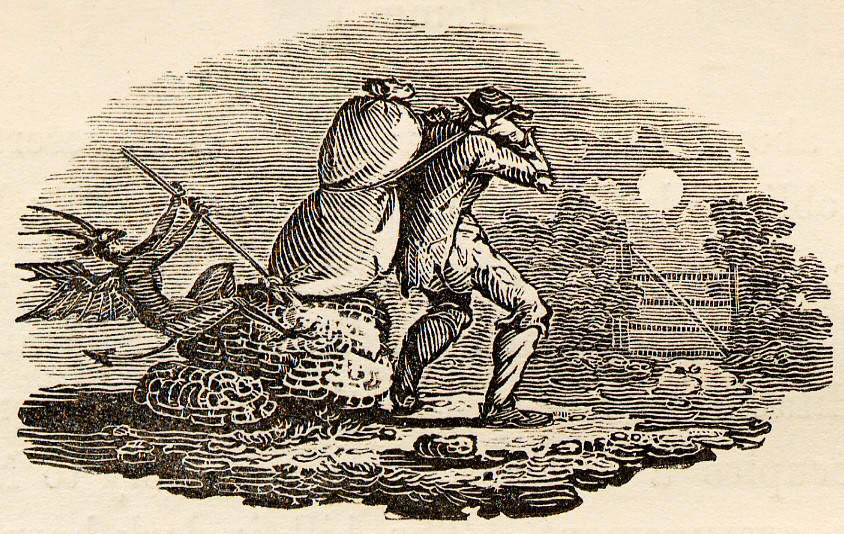
Uncaptioned tail-piece mentioned in Charlotte Brontë's Jane Eyre, Chapter 1: "The fiend pinning down the thief's pack behind him, I passed over quickly: it was an object of terror."

The History is repeatedly mentioned in Charlotte Brontë's 1847 novel Jane Eyre. John Reed throws the History of British Birds at Jane when she is ten; Jane uses the book as a place to which to escape, away from the painful Reed household; and Jane also bases her artwork on Bewick's illustrations. Jane and Mr Rochester use bird names for each other, including linnet, dove, skylark, eagle, and falcon. Brontë has Jane Eyre explain and quote Bewick:

I returned to my book--Bewick's History of British Birds: the letterpress thereof I cared little for, generally speaking; and yet there were certain introductory pages that, child as I was, I could not pass quite as a blank. They were those which treat of the haunts of sea-fowl; of 'the solitary rocks and promontories' by them only inhabited; of the coast of Norway, studded with isles from its southern extremity, the Lindeness, or Naze, to the North Cape--

Where the Northern Ocean, in vast whirls,
Boils round the naked, melancholy isles
Of farthest Thule; and the Atlantic surge
Pours in among the stormy Hebrides. (Note: This passage from Jane Eyre is quoting from Bewick's Introduction to Volume 2, Water Birds, which in turn is quoting a poem by James Thomson.)

In M. R. James' short story, Casting the Runes, a Bewick print is also referenced, described as "a moonlit road and a man walking along it, followed by an awful demon creature."

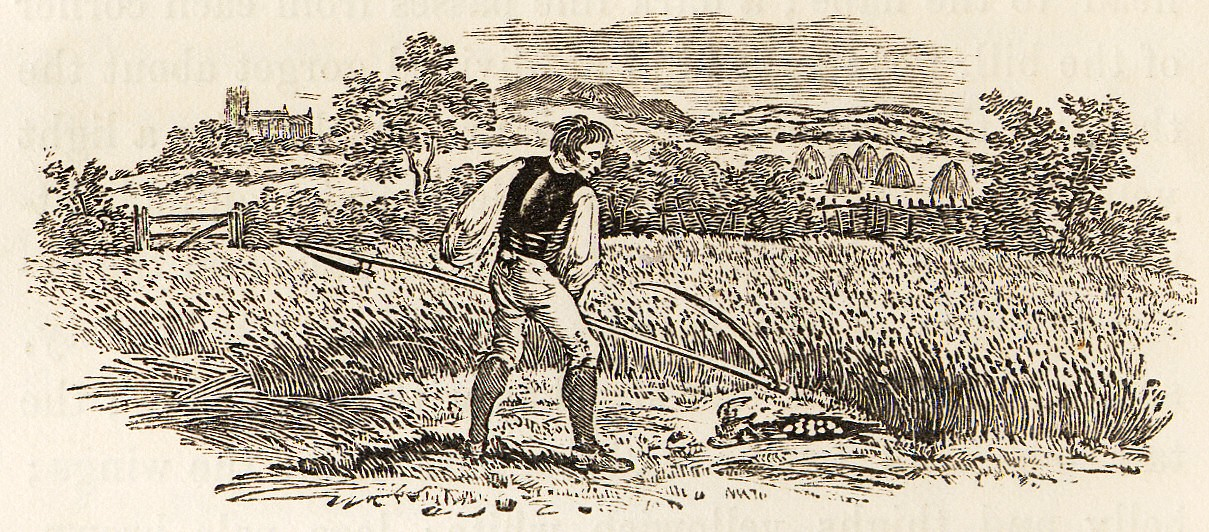
Uncaptioned tail-piece woodcut for the partridge, showing a reaper finding he has just killed a bird sitting on its nest; the image inspired a scene in Peter Hall's 1974 film Akenfield.

The English romantic poet William Wordsworth began his 1800 poem The Two Thieves; or, the Last Stage of Avarice with the lines

Oh now that the genius of Bewick were mine
And the skill which he learned on the banks of the Tyne.
Then the Muses might deal with me just as they chose,
For I'd take my last leave both of verse and of prose.

Peter Hall's 1974 film Akenfield (from the 1969 book by Ronald Blythe) contains a scene where the grandfather as a young man is reaping a cornfield. He weeps when he accidentally crushes a bird's egg, an image derived from Bewick's tail-piece woodcut for the partridge. The woodcut shows a reaper with a scythe, a dead bird and its nest of a dozen eggs on the ground under the scythe, which has just lifted. George Ewart Evans used the image on the title-page of his 1956 book about Blaxhall (near Charsfield, on which 'Akenfield' is probably partly based).

== Legacy ==
Bewick's reputation as a wood engraver was at its height in the nineteenth century, with the critic John Ruskin writing that the way Bewick had engraved the feathers of his birds was "the most masterly thing ever done in woodcutting".

The advent of mechanical printing techniques from the 1860s led to something of a decline in his importance, but his fame, already nationwide across Britain for his Birds, grew during the nineteenth century. In 1830, William Yarrell named Bewick's swan in his honour, and Bewick's son Robert engraved the bird for later editions of British Birds.

Bewick had met the American naturalist and bird painter John James Audubon in 1827, and had given him a copy of his Quadrupeds for his children. The American returned the compliment by naming a newly-discovered US bird species as Bewick's wren in honour of his friend.

The way in which Bewick had organised the text and illustrations in his Birds takes the form of, and sets a precedent for, modern field guides. Indeed, the French naturalist François Holandre (1753–1830) assembled a field guide using Bewick's woodcuts as early as 1800.

== Tail-pieces ==
A selection of tail-pieces from the book, where they have no captions.

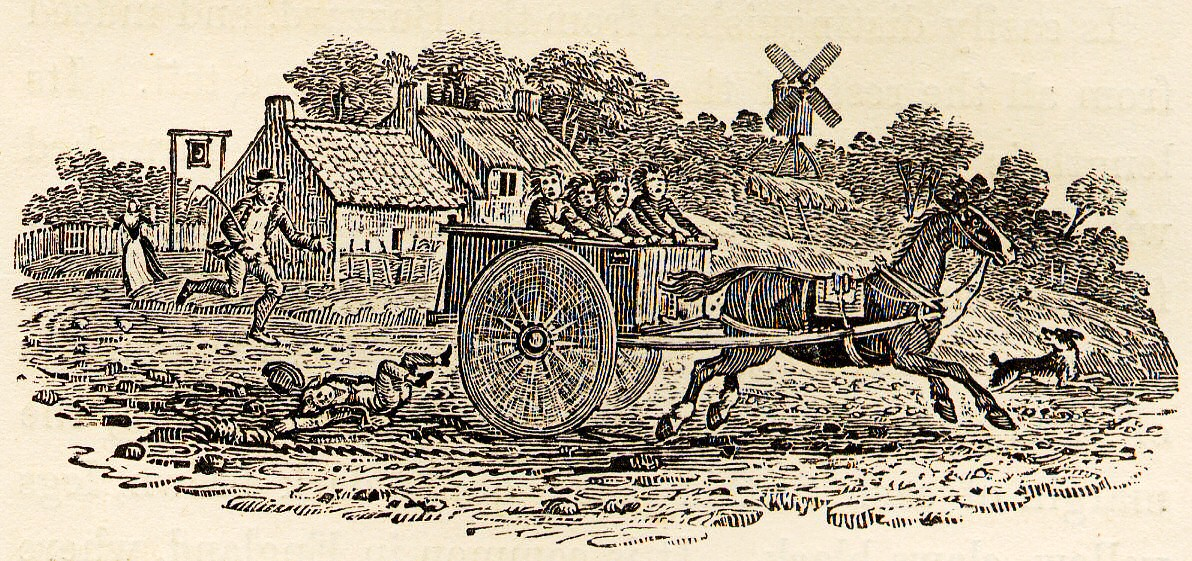
Children in runaway cart

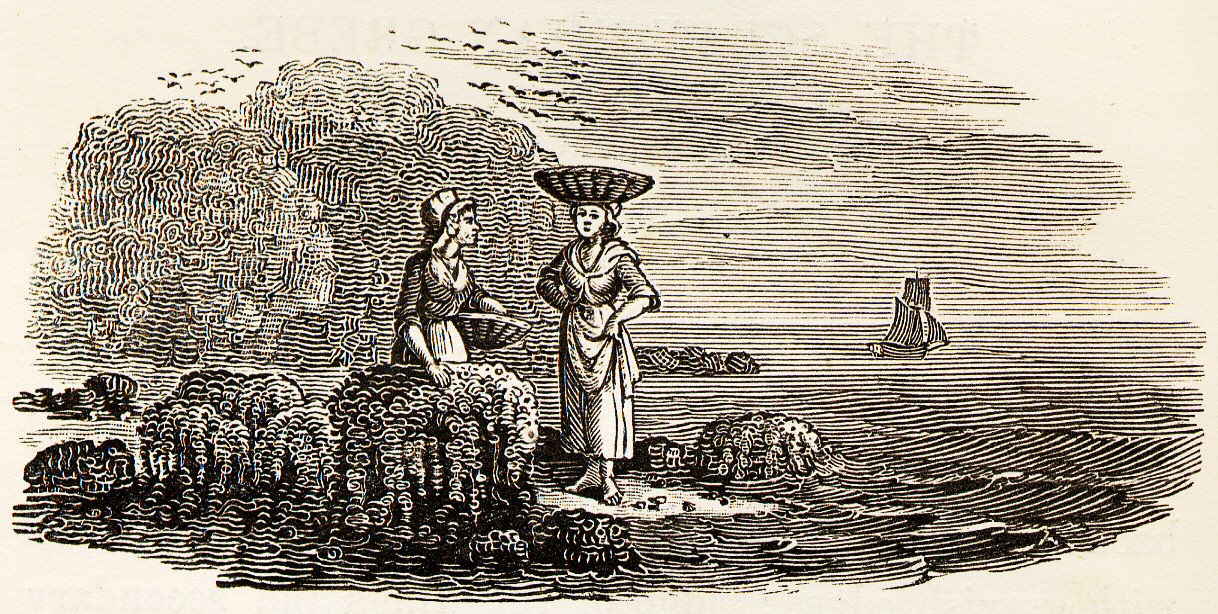
Women collecting shellfish

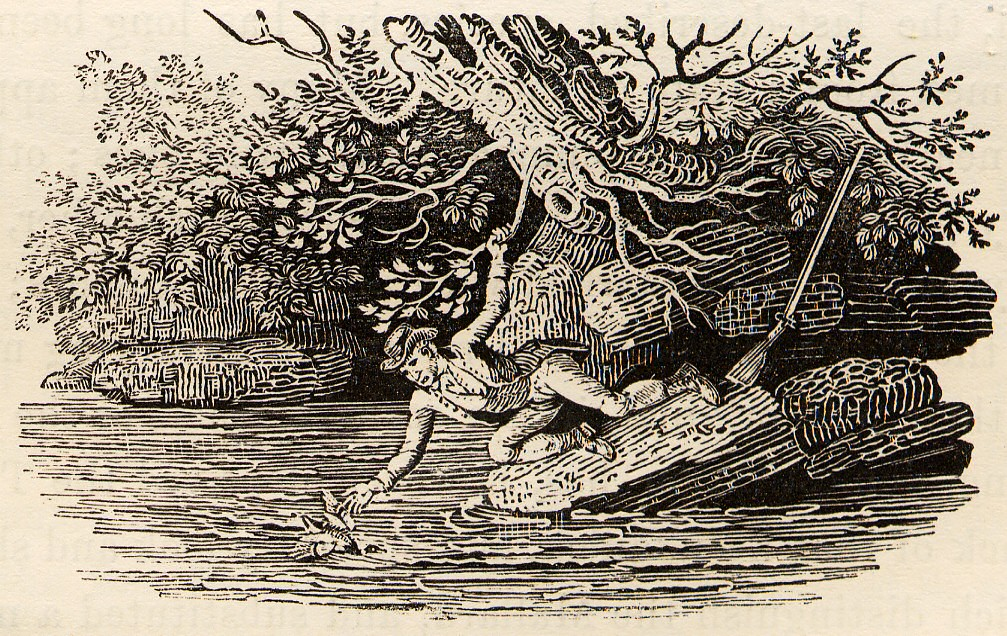
Hunter precariously retrieving duck from river

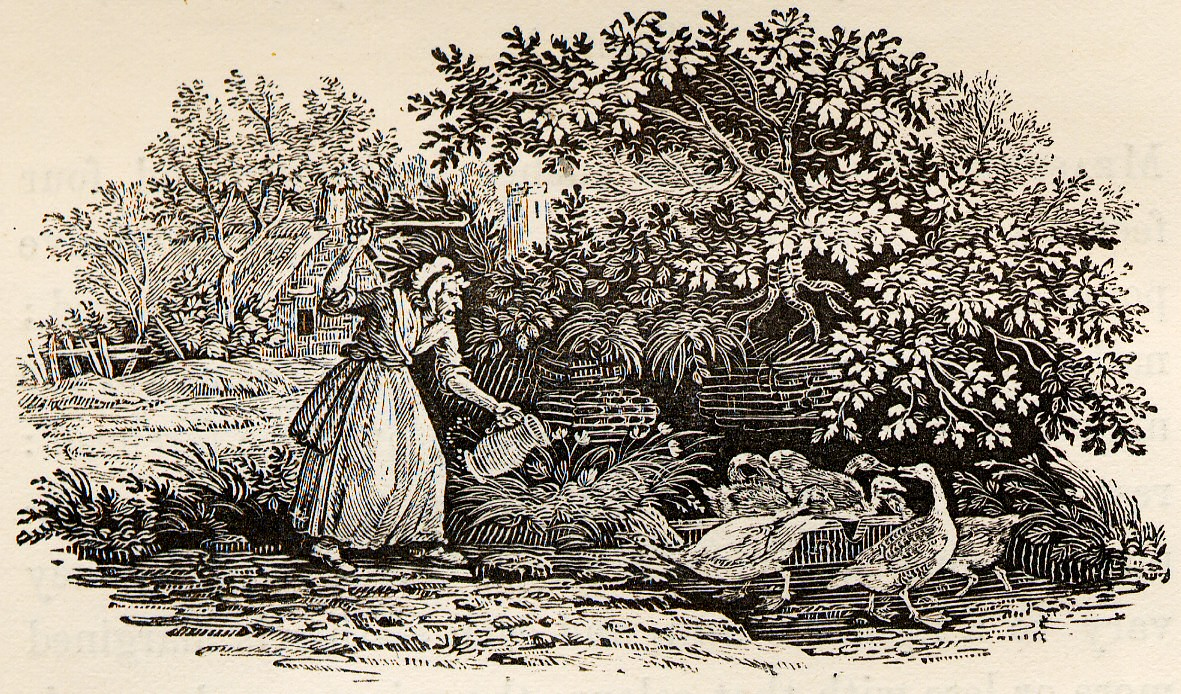
Old woman with ducks

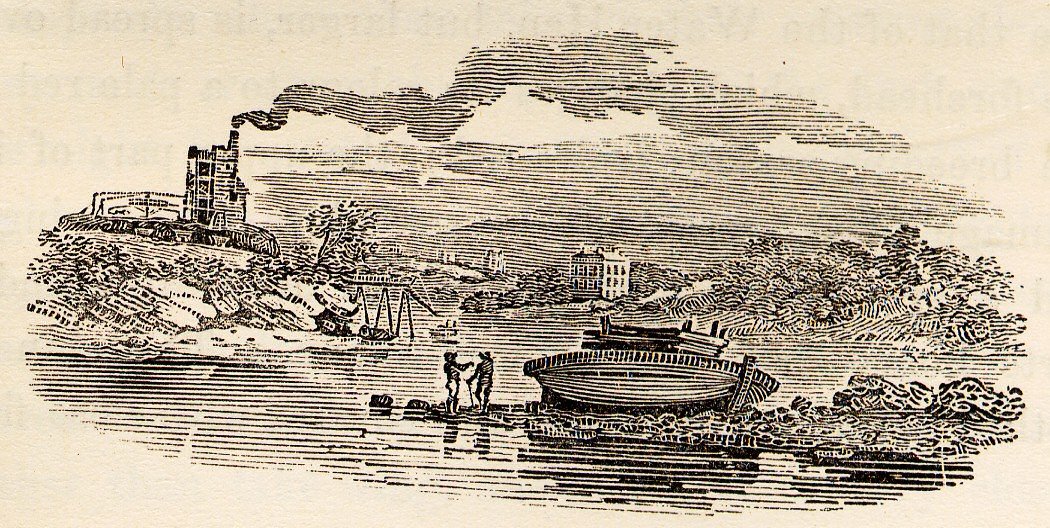
Industry on a riverside, perhaps the Tyne near Newcastle

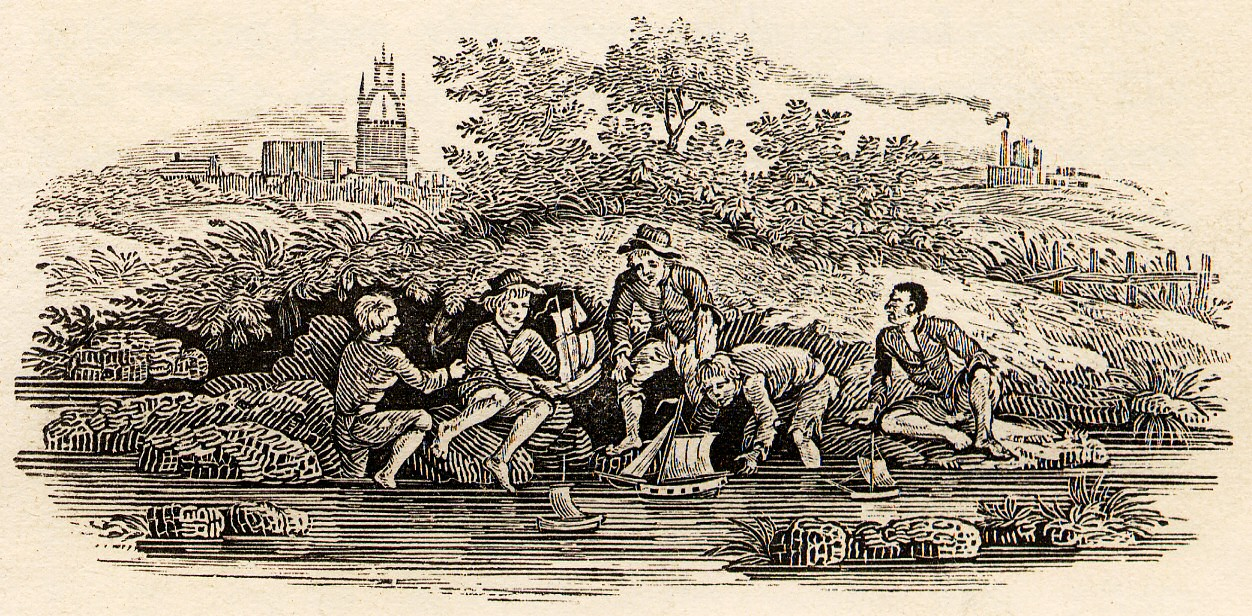
Toy boats in river

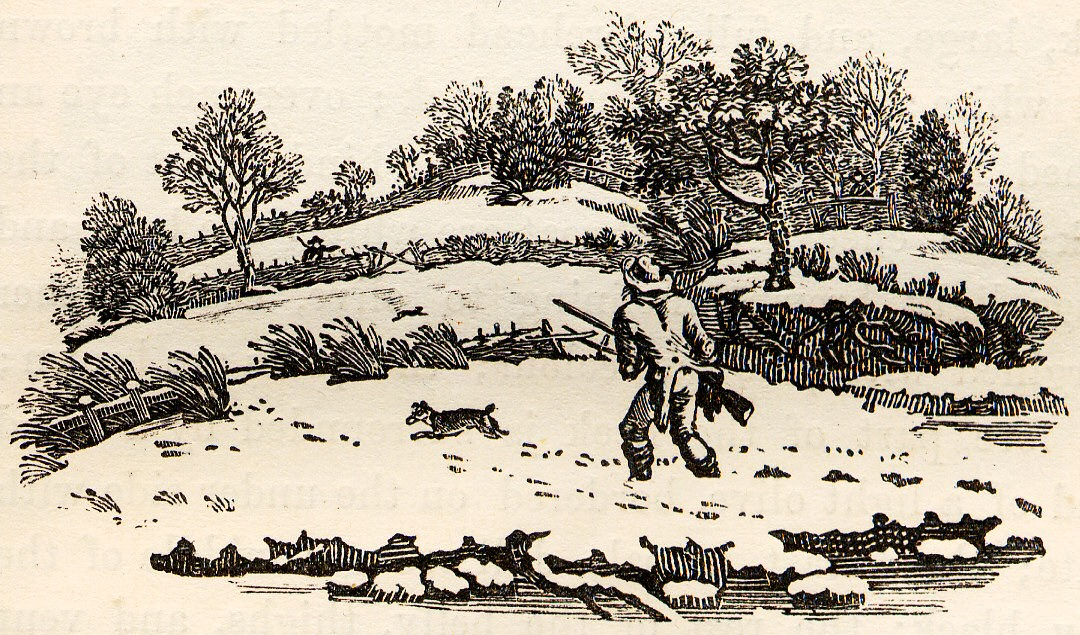
Hunter in the snow (Note: Jenny Uglow states that the boy is Bewick himself; the hunter Joe Liddell has wrapped the stock of his gun to keep the lock from freezing.)

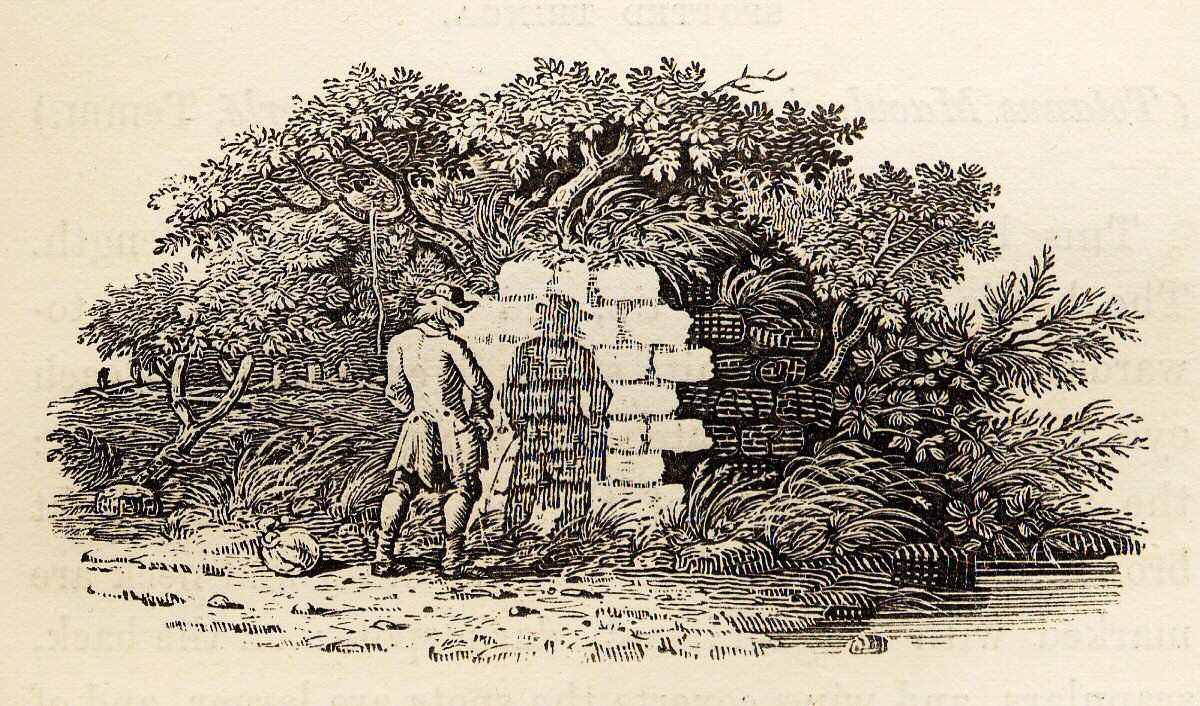
That pisseth against a wall

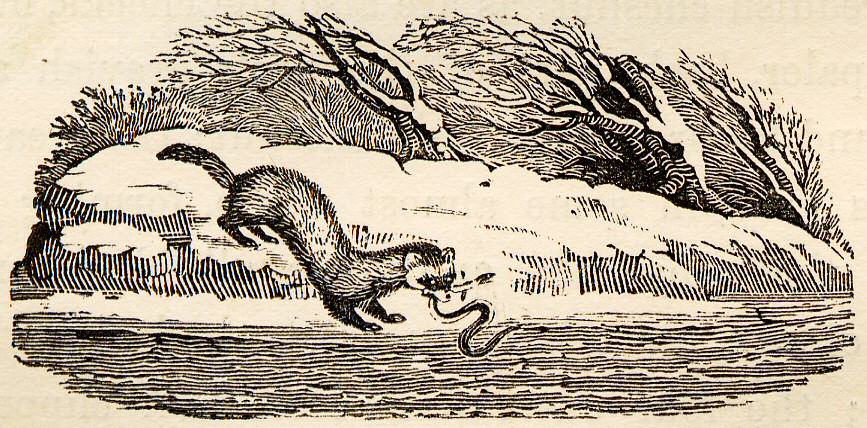
Polecat catching eel in winter

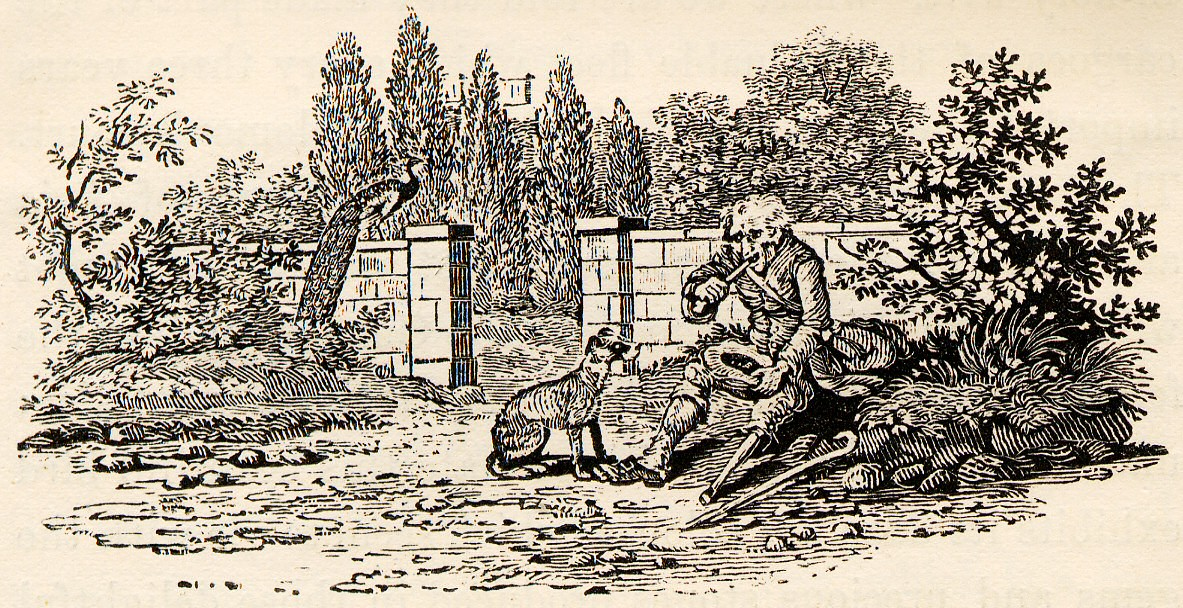
Pegleg and peacock

== Principal editions ==
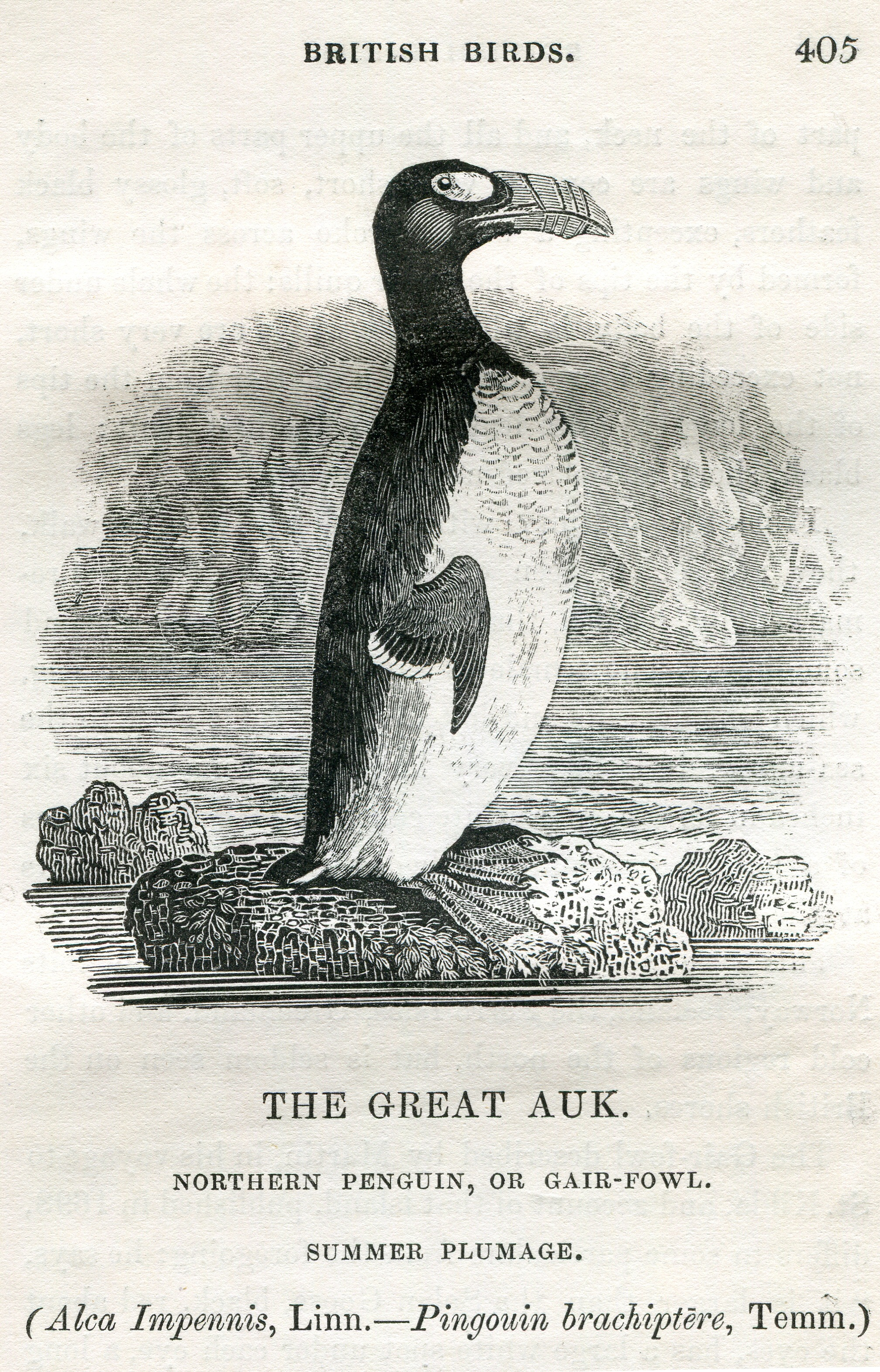
The "Great Auk, Northern Penguin, or Gair-Fowl". Bewick records that the species was "not numerous any where"; it became extinct some decades later.

Volume 1 first appeared in 1797, and was reprinted several times in 1797, then again in 1798 and 1800. Volume 1 was priced 13s. in boards. Volume 2 first appeared in 1804 (price 11. 4s. in boards). The first imprint was "Newcastle : Printed by Sol. Hodgson, for Beilby & Bewick; London: Sold by them, and G.C. and J. Robinson, 1797–1804." The book was reprinted in 1805, 1809, 1816, and 1817.

In 1821 a new edition appeared with supplements to both volumes and additional figures, with the imprint "Printed by Edward Walker, Pilgrim-Street, for T. Bewick: sold by him, and E. Charnley, Newcastle; and Longman and co., London, 1821." The book was reprinted in many subsequent versions with a 6th edition in 1826, another in 1832, an 8th edition in 1847, and a royal octavo 'Memorial Edition' in 1885.

- A History of British Birds. First Edition.

--- Bewick, Thomas; Beilby, Ralph (1797). Volume 1, Land Birds.
--- Bewick, Thomas (1804). Volume 2, Water Birds.

=== Selected modern versions ===
- Bewick's British Birds (2010), Arcturus. (hardback) ISBN 978-1-84837-647-2
- Bewick, Thomas; Aesop; Bewick, Jane (2012). Memorial Edition Of Thomas Bewick's Works: A History Of British Birds. (reproduced in original format) Ulan Press.

== Bibliography ==
- Bewick, Thomas (1797–1804). A History of British Birds. Newcastle: Beilby and Bewick.

Volume 1: Containing the History and Description of Land Birds
Volume 2: Containing the History and Description of Water Birds

- Birkhead, Tim (2011). The Wisdom of Birds: An Illustrated History of Ornithology. London: Bloomsbury. ISBN 978-0-7475-9822-0.
- Birkhead, Tim (2018). The Wonderful Mr Willughby: The First True Ornithologist. London: Bloomsbury. ISBN 978-1-4088-7848-4.
- Birkhead, Tim; Smith, Paul J.; Doherty, Meghan; Charmantier, Isabelle (2016). "Willughby's Ornithology". In Birkhead, Tim (ed.). Virtuoso by Nature: The Scientific Worlds of Francis Willughby FRS (1635–1672). Leiden: Brill. pp. 268–304. ISBN 978-90-04-28531-6.
- Charmantier, Isabelle; Johnston, Dorothy; Smith, Paul J. (2016). "The legacies of Francis Willughby". In Birkhead, Tim (ed.). Virtuoso by Nature: The Scientific Worlds of Francis Willughby FRS (1635–1672). Leiden: Brill. pp. 360–385. ISBN 978-90-04-28531-6.
- Dixon, Hugh (2010). Faulkner, Tom E.; Berry, Helen; Gregory, Jeremy (eds.). Thomas Bewick and the North-Eastern Landscape. Northern Landscapes: Representations and Realities of North-East England. Boydell & Brewer. pp. 261–278. ISBN 9781843835417.
- Johanson, Zerina; Barrett, Paul M.; Richter, Martha; Smith, Mike (2016). Arthur Smith Woodward: His Life and Influence on Modern Vertebrate Palaeontology. Geological Society of London, Special Publications. Vol. 430. London: Geological Society of London. ISBN 978-1-86239-741-5.
- Kusukawa, Sachiko (2016). "Historia Piscium (1686) and its sources". In Birkhead, Tim (ed.). Virtuoso by Nature: The Scientific Worlds of Francis Willughby FRS (1635–1672). Leiden: Brill. pp. 305–334. ISBN 978-90-04-28531-6.
- Uglow, Jenny (2006). Nature's Engraver: A Life of Thomas Bewick. Faber and Faber.
