= George Montagu (naturalist) =

British military officer and ornithologist (175?–1815)

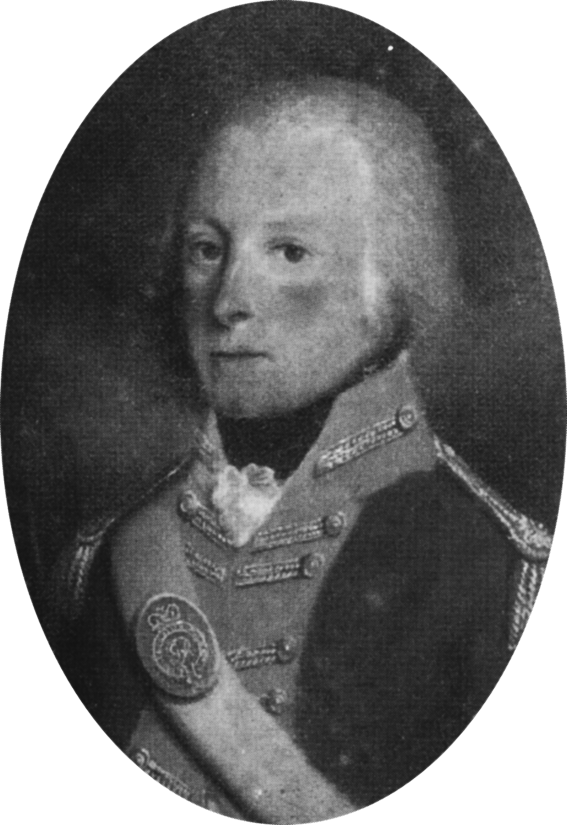
- Born: 1753; Lackham House, Chippenham, Wiltshire
- Died: 20 June 1815 (aged 61–62); Kingsbridge, Devon
- Known for: Ornithological Dictionary; Montagu's harrier
- Spouse: Ann Courtenay
- Scientific career
- Fields: Ornithology
- Author abbrev. (zoology): Montagu

George Montagu (1753 – 20 June 1815) was a British military officer and ornithologist. He is known for his pioneering Ornithological Dictionary of 1802, which for the first time accurately defined the status of Britain's birds. He is remembered today for species such as Montagu's harrier, named after him.

== Life and work ==
George Montagu was born to James Montagu (1713–1790), who was great-great-grandson of Lord James Montagu (d. 1665), who was a younger son of Henry Montagu, 1st Earl of Manchester.

Montagu is best known for his Ornithological Dictionary (1802) and his contributions to early knowledge of British birds. He showed that many previously accepted species were invalid, either because they were birds in summer or winter plumage or males and females of the same species. His study of harriers resulted in the discovery that Montagu's harrier was breeding in southern England. He was also involved in the first British records of cirl bunting, whose breeding range in England is around his home in Devon, as well as of western cattle egret, little gull and gull-billed tern, and the discovery and description of the roseate tern.

He was born at the family home of Lackham House in Wiltshire, some three miles south of Chippenham in the northwest of that county, and baptised at St Cyriac's Church, Lacock on 9 July 1753. In 1770 he joined the army as an ensign in the 15th Regiment of Foot. He resigned his commission as a captain in 1777, but eventually rose to the rank of Lieutenant-Colonel in the Wiltshire Militia. In August 1773 he married Ann Courtenay, niece of John Stuart, 3rd Earl of Bute, and they settled at Alderton House in Wiltshire. In 1798 Montagu left his wife and moved to Prospect House, near Kingsbridge in Devon. It was here that he wrote his two-volume Ornithological Dictionary; or Alphabetical Synopsis of British Birds. He subsequently entered a relationship with Elizabeth Dorville (daughter of Georg Wolff), who worked with him illustrating several of his scientific articles; they went on to have four children together.

Montagu had an interest in marine and freshwater natural history, and in 1803 published his Testacea Britannica, a History of British Marine, Land and Freshwater Shells. This described 470 species of molluscs, 100 of which were new to the British list, and many of which would later be classified as foraminifera. He supplied some new species of crustacean to William Elford Leach at the British Museum, and recorded some species of fish for the first time in English waters, as well as discovering new species including Montagu's blenny and Montagu's snapper (Lutjanidae). He also described the lesser horseshoe bat for the first time. Montagu's ray, Montagu's sucker and Montagu's sea snail are also named after him.

He died of tetanus after stepping on a nail at Knowle House, Kingsbridge, and was buried at Kingsbridge Parish Church. Montagu's collection of birds was bought by the British Museum, about 200 of which are now housed at the Tring Museum. His annotated copies of the Dictionary and Testacea were bequeathed to the Linnean Society. Montagu's shell collection is held by the Royal Albert Memorial Museum in Exeter and the Natural History Museum in London.

== Works ==
- Ornithological Dictionary; or Alphabetical Synopsis of British Birds, J. White, 1802.
- Supplement to the Ornithological Dictionary, or, Synopsis of British birds, S. Woolmer, 1813.

== Sources ==
- Mearns, Barbara; Mearns, Richard (1988). Biographies for Birdwatchers. Academic Press. ISBN 0-12-487422-3
- Moss, Stephen (2005). A Bird in the Bush: A Social History of Birdwatching. Aurum. ISBN 1-84513-085-5 (First published 2004)
