= Richard Mabey =

British writer and broadcaster

- Born: Richard Thomas Mabey; 20 February 1941 (age 85)
- Education: Rothesay School; Berkhamsted Preparatory School; Berkhamsted School
- Alma mater: St Catherine's College, University of Oxford
- Occupations: Writer and broadcaster
- Awards: Whitbread Biography of the Year, 1986; British Book Awards' Illustrated Book of the Year, 1996; Botanical Society of the British Isles' President's Award, 1996; East Anglian Book Award, 2011; Two Leverhulme Fellowships; Honorary doctorates from St Andrews, Essex University and the University of East Anglia

Richard Thomas Mabey (born 20 February 1941) is a writer and broadcaster, chiefly on the relations between nature and culture.

== Education ==
Mabey was educated at three independent schools, all in Berkhamsted, Hertfordshire. The first was at Rothesay School, followed by Berkhamsted Preparatory School and then Berkhamsted School. He then went to St Catherine's College at the University of Oxford where he read Philosophy, Politics and Economics.

== Life and work ==
After Oxford, Mabey worked as a lecturer in Social Studies in Further Education at Dacorum College, Hemel Hempstead, then as a senior editor at Penguin Books. He became a full-time writer in 1974. He spent most of his life among the beechwoods of the Chilterns. He now lives in the Waveney Valley in Norfolk, with his partner Polly Lavender, and retreats to a boat on the Norfolk Broads.

He appeared in a 1975 episode of the BBC Television series The World About Us, "In Deepest Britain", with John Gooders and other naturalists, giving an unscripted narration of the wildlife observed during a country walk. He wrote and presented later episodes of the series, including "The Unofficial Countryside" (1975), "The Flowering of Britain" (1980) and "A Prospect of Kew", about Kew Gardens (1981). "The Unofficial Countryside" and "The Flowering of Britain" were based on his books of the same names. He also wrote and narrated the 1996 BBC television series Postcards from the Country, for whose eight, 40-minute episodes he was series producer, as well as being the producer-director on four. "White Rock, Black Water" (1985) was a specially written episode of the series The Natural World, about the limestone country of the Yorkshire Dales, and a Channel 4 eight-part series – Back to the Roots – explored the role of plants in Britain's contemporary culture. In the 1990s he often appeared on the BBC's Country File.

Between 1982 and 1986 he sat on the UK government's advisory body, the Nature Conservancy Council. Mabey writes regularly for The Guardian, the New Statesman, The Times and Granta. A selection of these writings was compiled as the book Country Matters. He has written a personal column in BBC Wildlife magazine since 1984, and a selection of these columns has been published as A Brush with Nature.

Between 2000 and 2002 Mabey suffered from depression, and his book Nature Cure, describing his experiences and recovery in the context of man's relationship with landscape and nature, was short-listed for three major literary awards: the Whitbread Biography of the Year, the Royal Society of Literature's Ondaatje Prize for evoking the spirit of place and the J. R. Ackerley Prize for Autobiography.

He has edited and introduced editions of Richard Jefferies, Gilbert White, Flora Thompson and Peter Matthiessen. His contributions to BBC Radio include "The Scientist and the Romantic", a series of five essays on his lifelong relationship with science and the natural environment broadcast in The Essay on Radio 3 in 2009, and Changing Climates, on our everyday experience of living with the weather, in 2013. Mabey was the first president of the London Wildlife Trust and later a vice-president; Mabey's Meadow, named for him by the London Wildlife Trust, was one of his favourite haunts, and is described in his book The Unofficial Countryside (1974). It provides the only access to Frays Island in the River Colne.

== Awards and distinctions ==
Mabey has been awarded two Leverhulme Fellowships, and honorary doctorates by St Andrews, Essex and East Anglia for his contributions to nature writing. He was awarded a Civil List Pension in 2008 for services to literature. He was elected a Fellow of the Royal Society of Literature in 2011. He is a trustee of the arts and conservation charity Common Ground, vice-president of the Open Spaces Society, patron of the John Clare Society and president of the Waveney and Blythe Arts.

His life of Gilbert White won the 1986 Whitbread Biography of the Year. His Flora Britannica won the British Book Awards' Illustrated Book of the Year and the Botanical Society of the British Isles' President's Award, and was runner-up for the BP Natural World Book Prize.

He was a guest on the BBC Radio 4 programme Desert Island Discs in 1997.

== Portraits ==
The National Portrait Gallery has a 1984 bromide print of Richard Mabey by Mark Gerson. Mabey sat for sculptor Jon Edgar in Norfolk during 2007, as part of the Environment Triptych (2008) along with Mary Midgley and James Lovelock.

== Works ==
- —— (1972). Food for Free. Collins.
- —— (1973). The Unofficial Countryside. Collins. ISBN 978-0002118552.
- —— (1974). Pollution Handbook. Penguin.
- —— (1977). Plants with a Purpose. Collins.
- —— (1978). The Roadside Wildlife Book. Sphere. ISBN 978-0722157114.
- —— (1980). The Common Ground: A Place for Nature in Britain's Future?. Hutchinson. ISBN 978-0091391706.
- —— (1983). Back to the Roots. Arena. ISBN 978-0099314509. (with Francesca Greenoak)
- —— (1983). In a Green Shade. Hutchinson.
- —— (1985). The Frampton Flora. Century. ISBN 978-0712608596.
- —— (1986). Gilbert White. Ebury. 2007 edition. University of Virginia Press.
- —— (1988). The Flowering of Kew. Ebury. ISBN 978-0712611343.
- —— (1988). The New Age Herbalist. Prentice Hall. (with Michael McIntyre)
- —— (1990). The Flowers of May. Collins & Brown. ISBN 978-1855850309.
- —— (1990). Home Country. Ebury. ISBN 978-0712637206.
- —— (1991). A Nature Journal. Chatto & Windus. ISBN 978-0701135072. (with illustrations by Clare Roberts)
- —— (1993). The Wildwood, The: In Search of Britain's Ancient Forests. Arum. ISBN 978-1854102423. - photography by Gareth Lovett Jones
- —— (1993). Whistling in the Dark: In Pursuit of the Nightingale. Sinclair-Stevenson. ISBN 978-1856191760.
- —— (1994). Landlocked: In Pursuit of the Wild. Sinclair-Stevenson. ISBN 978-1856194327.
- —— (1996). Flora Britannica. Chatto & Windus. ISBN 978-1856193771.
- —— (1996). The Flora of Hampshire. Harley Books. (co-author)
- —— (1999). Country Matters: Selected Writings.
- —— (2005). Nature Cure. Chatto & Windus. ISBN 978-0701176013.
- —— (2006). Fencing Paradise: The Uses And Abuses of Plants. Eden Project. ISBN 978-1903919323.
- —— (2008). The Full English Cassoulet: Making Do in the Kitchen. Chatto & Windus. ISBN 978-0701182533.
- —— (2007). Beechcombings: The Narratives of Trees. Chatto & Windus. ISBN 978-1856197335.
- —— (2010). A Brush with Nature.
- —— (2010). Weeds: The Story of Outlaw Plants. Profile. ISBN 978-1846680762.
- —— (2010). The Barley Bird: Notes on the Suffolk Nightingale. Profile.
- —— (2011). The Perfumier and the Stinkhorn. Profile. ISBN 978-1846684074.
- —— (2013). Turned Out Nice Again: On Living With the Weather. Profile. ISBN 978-1781250525.
- —— (2013). The Ash and the Beech: The Drama of Woodland Change. Vintage. ISBN 978-0099587231.
- —— (2016). The Cabaret of Plants: Forty Thousand Years of Plant Life and the Human Imagination. W. W. Norton & Company. ISBN 978-0393239973.
- —— (2019). Turning The Boat For Home - A Life Writing About Nature. Penguin Random House. ISBN 978-0701181086.

=== Contributions ===
- Hill, Thomas (1988). The Gardener's Labyrinth - The First English Gardening Book. Oxford Paperbacks. ISBN 978-0192825803. (Editor)
- Cocker, Mark (2005). Birds Britannica. Chatto & Windus. ISBN 978-0701169077. (Editor)
- Marren, Peter (2010). Bugs Britannica. Chatto & Windus. ISBN 978-0701181802. (Editor)
- Jackson, Kurt (2012). A New Genre of Landscape Painting. Lund Humphries. ISBN 978-1848221024.
- Class (ed.), 1968
- The Natural History of Selborne (ed.), Penguin, 1977
- In Search of Food (with David Mabey)
- Cold Comforts, 1983
- Second Nature (ed.), 1984
- NHS Everyman (ed.), 1993
- Landscape with Figures: an anthology of Richard Jefferies (ed.), 1986-9
- The Oxford Book of Nature Writing, 1995
- The Yorkshire Dales (with landscape photographer Graham Nobles)
- The Garden of Weeds, 2010

=== Introductions and forewords ===
- The Snow Leopard, Peter Matthiessen, Viking Press, 1978, ISBN 009977111X
- Ashby, Eric (1989). The Secret Life of the New Forest. Chatto & Windus. ISBN 0701134046.
- The Tree: A Celebration of Our Living Skyline, edited by Peter Wood, David & Charles, 1993, ISBN 0-7153-9481-9
- Nonis, U; Paul Sterry (1993). Mushrooms & toadstools of Britain and Europe. David & Charles. ISBN 9780715301555.
- An Exaltation of Skylarks, compiled by Stewart Beer, SMH Books, (1995), ISBN 0-9512619-7-5
- Lark Rise to Candleford (2009 edition)
- Wilkinson, David (2013). Keeping the Barbarians at Bay: The Last Years of Kenneth Allsop, Green Pioneer. Signal. ISBN 978-1908493842.

=== Educational and children's books ===
- Pop Process (Hutchinson 1969)
- Behind the Scene
- Food
- Children in Primary School
- Street Flowers. Viking. 1976.
- Oak And Company (Kestrel Books, 1983) ISBN 0722651023

=== Films ===
- Postcards from the Country, BBC, 1996
- Richard Mabey's 2011 "Botanical Busk" tour (of the London canals, commissioned by the Floating Cinema)

=== Radio ===
- The Essay: "The Scientist and the Romantic", BBC Radio 3 (5 episodes, 2009)
- Mabey in the Wild, BBC Radio 4 (2 series, 2011-)
- The Essay: "Changing Climates", BBC Radio 3 (5 episodes, 2013)
