= Birds Britannica =

- Author: Mark Cocker; Richard Mabey
- Genre: Ornithology
- Publisher: Chatto & Windus
- Publication date: 1 September 2005
- Publication place: United Kingdom
- Pages: 484
- ISBN: 0-7011-6907-9
- Preceded by: Flora Britannica
- Followed by: Bugs Britannica

Birds Britannica is a book by Mark Cocker and Richard Mabey, about the birds of the United Kingdom, and a sister volume to Mabey's 1996 Flora Britannica, about British plants. It was published in 2005 by Chatto & Windus.

According to the project's official website:

It covers cultural links; social history; birds as food; ecology; the lore and language of birds; myths, art, literature and music; anecdotes, birdsong and rare facts; modern developments; migration, the seasons and our sense of place.

Over 1,000 members of the public provided details of their observations and experiences, during the book's eight-year research period. Mabey's contribution was limited by his depression, leading to Cocker having a leading role, doing the bulk of the work and this more prominent credit.

== Reviews ==
The Guardian described the book as "a glorious encyclopedia" and Cocker as "British bird life's perfect encyclopedist". The Times said "The entries for every species are a fascinating distillation of expert knowledge, personal account, reminiscence, literary reference and folk belief".

== See also ==
- Birds Britannia – a 2010 television series on the same subject.
