= Kids Can Say No! =

1985 British short educational film

- Opening title card
- Directed by: Jessica Skippon
- Written by: Anita Bennett
- Produced by: Jessica Skippon
- Starring: Rolf Harris
- Cinematography: Deb Ditchburn
- Music by: Peter Alsop
- Production company: Rolf Harris Video
- Distributed by: Skippon Video
- Release date: October 1985 (United Kingdom)
- Running time: 20 minutes
- Country: United Kingdom
- Language: English

Kids Can Say No! is a 1985 British short educational film produced and directed by Jessica Skippon and written by Anita Bennett. It is intended to teach children between ages five and eight how to avoid situations where they might be sexually abused, how to escape such situations, and how to get help if they are abused. In the film, Australian celebrity Rolf Harris (who was later convicted of such crimes) is in a park with a group of four children and tells them about proper and improper physical intimacy, which he calls "yes" and "no" feelings. The film has four role-playing scenes in which children encounter paedophiles, with Harris and the children discussing each scene.

Harris said that he came up with the idea for the film on a 1982 Canadian tour when he saw Vancouver's Green Thumb Theatre production of Feeling Yes, Feeling No, a play about child sexual abuse. Kids Can Say No!, released in October 1985 on VHS in the United Kingdom, was the first British children's film about sexual abuse and was purchased by police forces, educational institutions, and libraries across Europe. Upon the film's release, The Times obtained opinions from four sexual-abuse experts, who unanimously opposed using Kids Can Say No! or any other film to teach children about the subject; among other objections, experts cited the necessary vagueness of the terminology in the film as well as concerns about inspiring false accusations. The Australian Broadcasting Corporation received a positive response to its 1988 broadcast of Kids Can Say No! and therefore broadcast it a second time that year. Harris and Skippon collaborated on the 1986 sequel Beyond the Scare, which advises teachers about what to do if a child discloses abuse. Showings of Kids Can Say No! eventually decreased as VHS became less popular in favour of DVD in the late 1990s and early to mid-2000s.

Kids Can Say No! resurfaced in 2014, when Harris was prosecuted for twelve counts of indecently assaulting young girls. The prosecutors found Kids Can Say No! on YouTube and wanted to show it at trial to illustrate its unintentional irony, but the film was not admitted as evidence. Harris was found guilty of all counts. During the trial, it was learned that, while Harris was filming Kids Can Say No!, he was in the midst sexually abusing his daughter Bindi's best friend and, by its release, he had committed nine of the twelve assaults. According to Richard Guilliatt and Jacquelin Magnay in an article in The Australian, Harris's campaign against paedophilia in Kids Can Say No! can "be seen in retrospect as either monumental self-delusion or a sign of deep, self-lacerating guilt".

== Contents ==
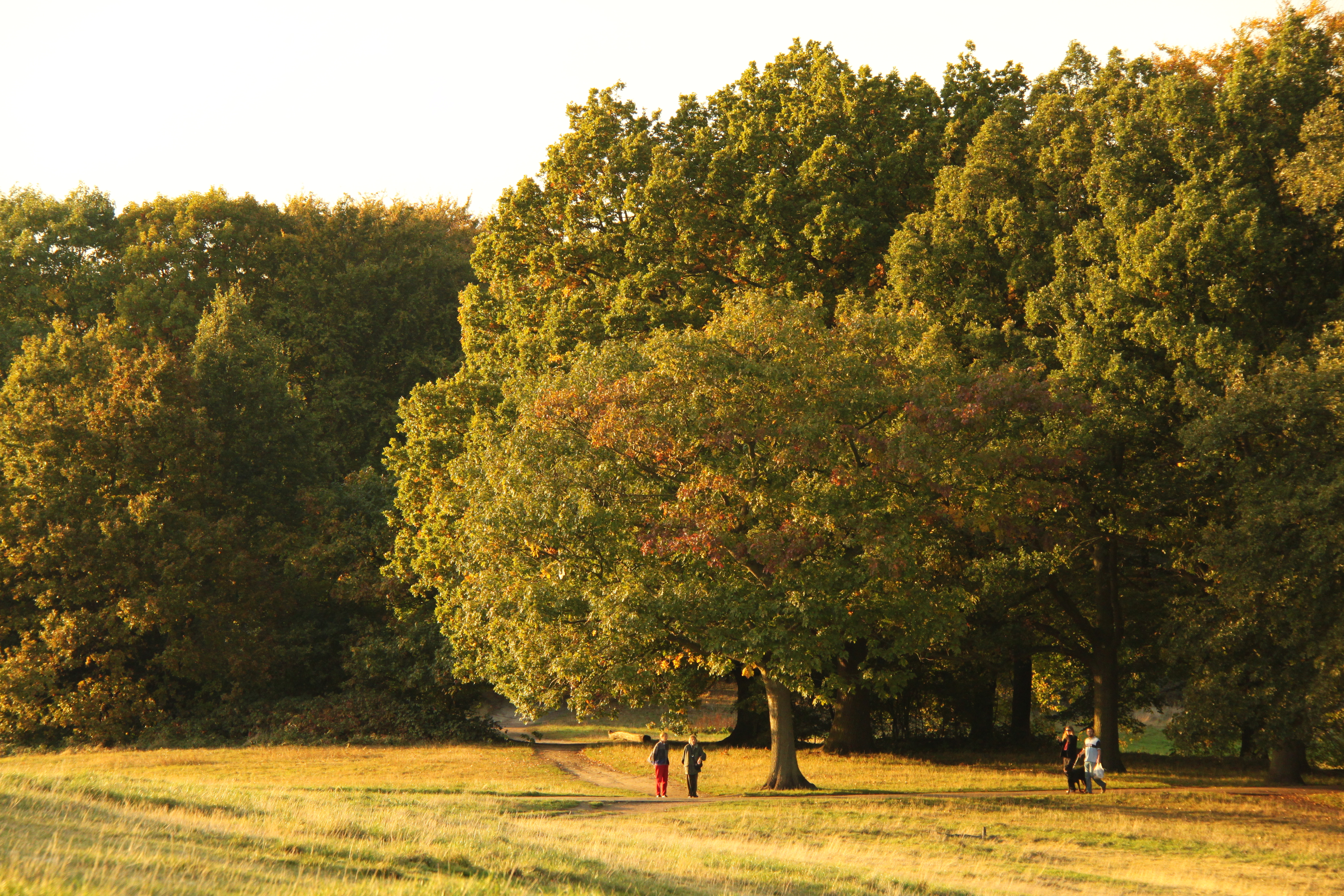
In Kids Can Say No!, Rolf Harris sits with four children under a tree in Hampstead Heath (pictured) and warns them about paedophiles.

In Kids Can Say No!, Australian celebrity Rolf Harris appears with four children between the ages of seven and eight and warns them about paedophiles. The film begins with its theme song, "My Body", which has the chorus "My body's nobody's body but mine. You run your own body. Let me run mine." During the song, children ride a seesaw, skip rope and cycle. Harris sits under a tree in a park with the children—two girls and two boys—and tells them about proper and improper physical intimacy, which he calls "yes" and "no" feelings; a parent's hug is given as an example of a "yes" feeling. In vox populi segments, children give other examples of "yes" and "no" feelings; one child says that being tickled by his father is a "yes" feeling, and another says that being squeezed hard is a "no" feeling. Harris leads the children in a chant of "Go away!" as an exercise in how to respond to "no" feelings. He teaches the children about stranger danger, and that adults they know can also be a threat.

The film includes four role-playing scenes. In the first, a man tells a girl that he will buy her a toy if she goes home with him. In the second, eight-year-old Natasha goes to her friend's house and finds that only her friend's father is home; after he intentionally spills water on her clothes, he tells her to take them off. The film cuts to Harris, who says, "She should look him straight in the eye and tell him to stop, go away". In the third scene, a group of older boys try to lure young children into their "special club"; they lead one young boy to a secluded, wooded area and try to convince him to remove his clothes. In the last role-playing scene, Sophie's father offers her a secret bubble bath; afterwards, he tells her not to tell anyone because he would go to jail and it would be her fault.

Harris draws a stick figure in the film and says that children who find it difficult to explain where they have been touched can draw a picture and point out the place.

During and after each of the role-playing scenes, Harris and the children discuss the situation and what the child should do. Harris tells the children not to be afraid to tell someone if they have been improperly touched, saying, "Some people don't act right with kids, and they need help. You can't protect them from trouble that they themselves have caused, and it's better to say something so that you and the family can get the help you need. You know nothing gets better by keeping quiet about it." Harris says that, if it is difficult to explain where they have been touched, they can draw a picture or point to the place on a doll. The film ends with "My Body" sung by a group of people including Harris, two police officers, and some children.

== Production ==
Kids Can Say No! is a twenty-minute British short educational film intended to teach children about sexual abuse. Harris said he was naive about the subject and was motivated to make the film by a female teacher who told him that, when she spoke to her students about abuse, a traumatised girl ran out of the room; the girl later disclosed that she was being abused by a family member. According to Harris, he came up with the idea for the film on a 1982 Canadian tour when he saw Vancouver's Green Thumb Theatre production of Feeling Yes, Feeling No, a play about child sexual abuse. He was also inspired by a similar Australian production and a Swedish film about two children befriended by a large man on a farm. In an interview, Harris said that, when he saw the Swedish film, he thought the man was going to abuse the children, but that his expectations were incorrect and that "the film was completely innocent; I was not".

Harris, then host of Rolf's Cartoon Time, approached the National Society for the Prevention of Cruelty to Children (NSPCC) and the Tavistock Clinic with his idea about making a film on child sexual abuse. Both organisations were receptive. Harris had previous connections with the NSPCC, having appeared in films in 1963 and 1973 promoting the NSPCC League of Pity, and a NSPCC official suggested that he use child actors in Kids Can Say No! Harris approached director Jessica Skippon, with whom he had made a film about water safety, and said that he wanted to make Kids Can Say No! to protect children. Harris later said that production was hampered by colleagues opposing the idea that children should be told about sexual abuse.

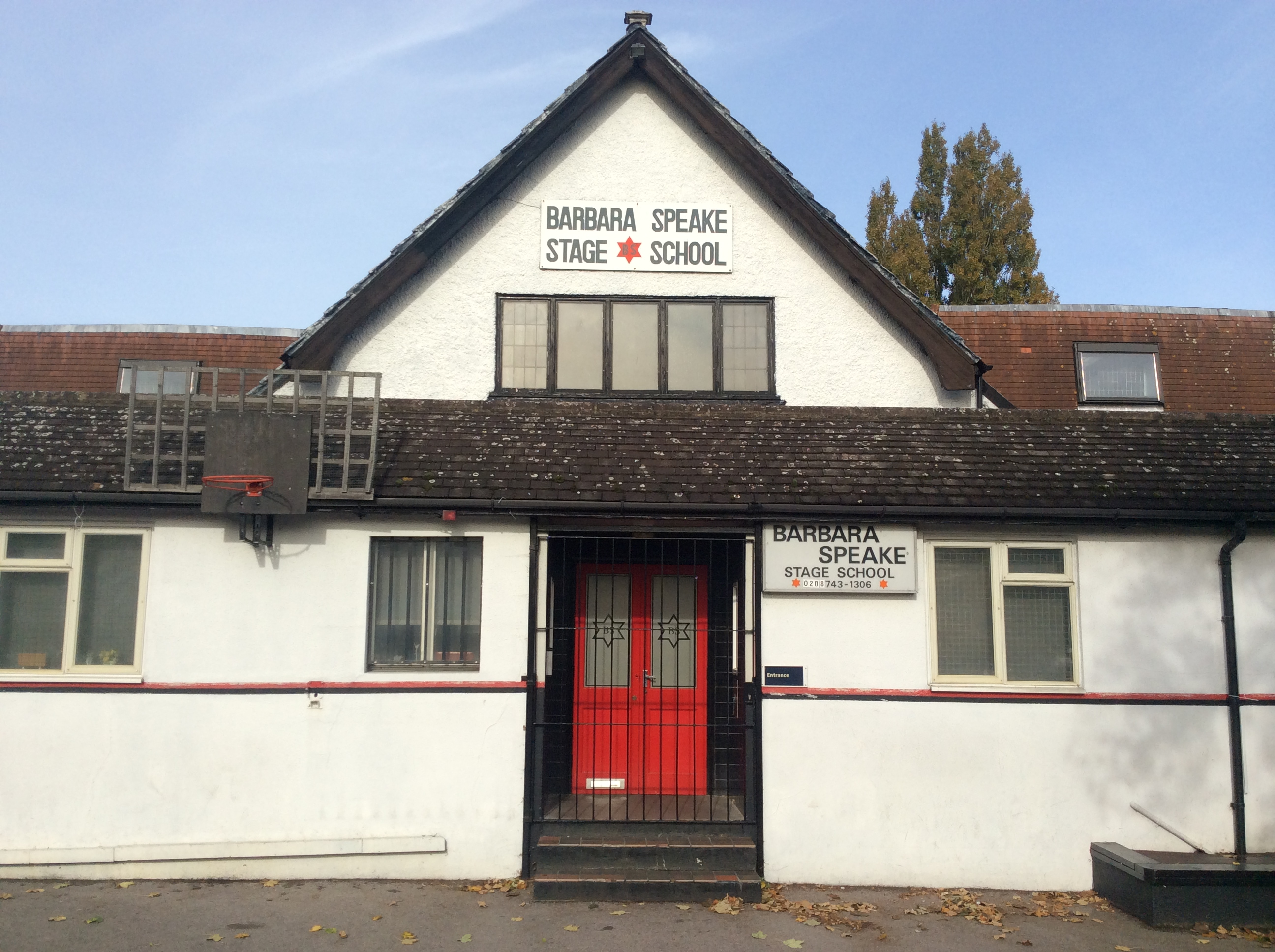
The child actors who appear in Kids Can Say No! were students at the Barbara Speake Stage School.

Kids Can Say No! was made in London with input from Carolyn Okell Jones, an expert on child abuse, and was filmed on Hampstead Heath in 1985. The child actors were students at the Barbara Speake Stage School. Skippon directed and produced the film. Funding was difficult because neither the Department of Health and Social Security nor the Home Office considered the film under their jurisdiction, and each office referred Skippon to the other. Childwatch donated £15,000 and technical facilities were provided by Barclays Bank Video. American children's songwriter Peter Alsop wrote the song. American Anita Bennett wrote the script, which was reviewed and approved by a NSPCC committee. Kids Can Say No! was the second film from Rolf Harris Video, an educational video production company Harris founded in 1980. In an interview, he said that his role of talking with children about sexual abuse in the film was a natural one because "my track record has made me a believable person. I have never betrayed the kids' trust".

Kids Can Say No! was the first British children's film about sexual abuse. The film is intended to teach children between ages five and eight how to avoid situations where they might be abused, how to get out of such situations, and how to get help if they are abused. Skippon later said that, although the people working on the film tried to keep it from being frightening to children, the task was difficult. She said that the film was not intended for home viewing and that only well-informed adults trained in the subject should present it to children.

In April 1986, Harris met with Western Australia Police officials and members of several state-government departments in Mount Hawthorn to propose another film for children about how to handle sexual predators. Despite Harris' offer to work for free, the officials declined and instead developed a broader campaign on the subject without Harris.

== Release ==
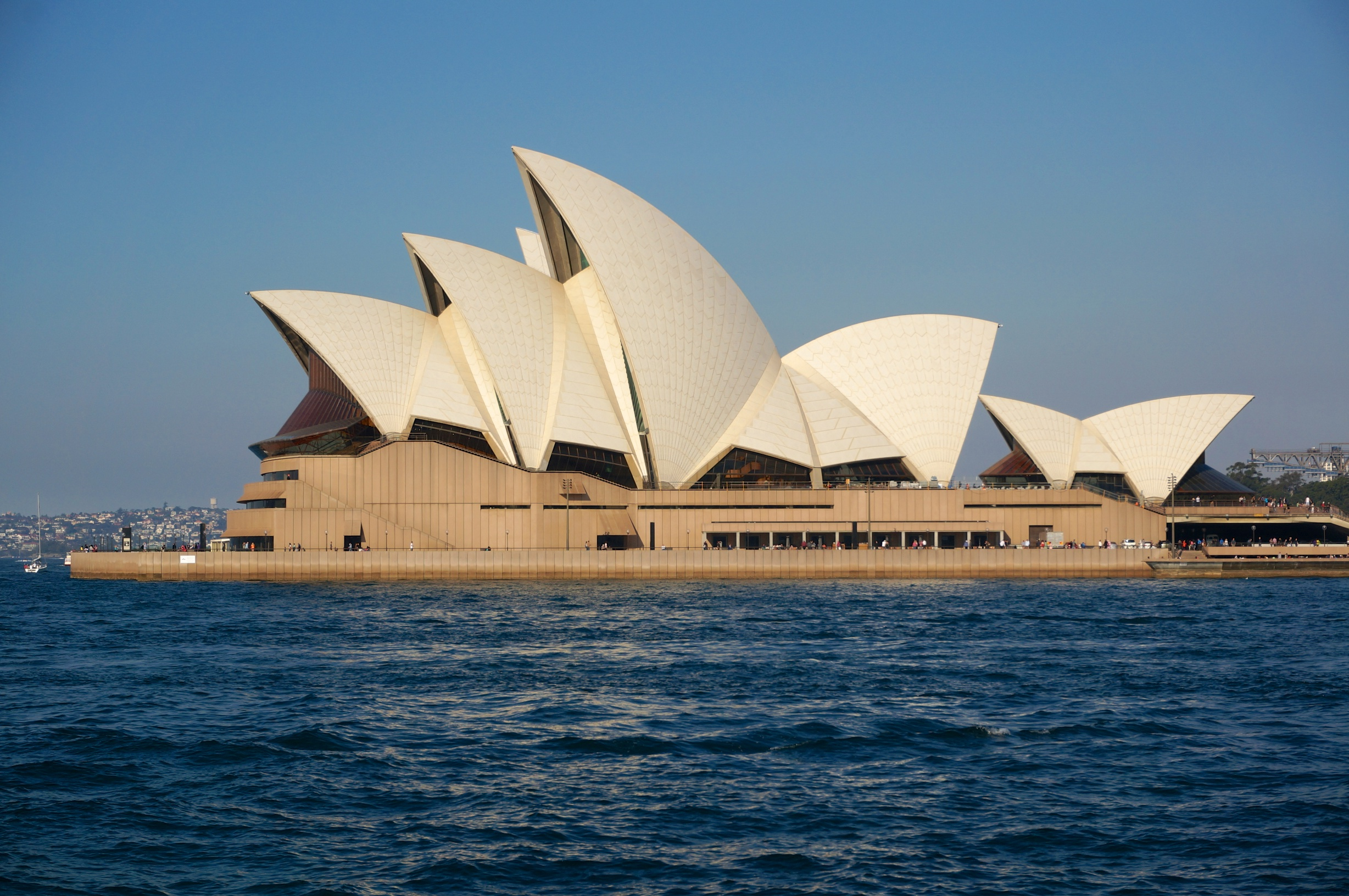
Child-abuse expert Carolyn Okell Jones presented Kids Can Say No! at the Sydney Opera House (pictured) in 1986 as part of the sixth International Congress on Child Abuse and Neglect.

Kids Can Say No! was released in the United Kingdom in October 1985 on VHS with notes for teachers and two relevant books, and was distributed by Skippon Video, Skippon's UK-based company. Although several other short children's educational films about sexual abuse were on the market in the UK including several also released that year, Kids Can Say No! was the only British film; the others were made in Australia, Canada and the United States.

In August 1986, Jones presented the film at the Sydney Opera House in Australia as part of the sixth International Congress on Child Abuse and Neglect, the largest conference in the world on child abuse. The 56-year-old Harris, who was chosen to be master of ceremonies for the three-day conference's opening event because of his celebrity and involvement with the film, told the audience that paedophilia was finally "coming out from under its veil of secrecy".

Copies of Kids Can Say No! were purchased by police forces, educational institutions, and libraries across Europe. The VHS tapes circulated widely in schools and rape crisis centres in Australia; although showings began to decrease as VHS became less popular, the film was a significant teaching tool. The Australian Broadcasting Corporation received a positive response to its 1988 broadcast of Kids Can Say No! and therefore broadcast it a second time that year.

=== Sequel ===
After the release of Kids Can Say No!, many teachers who showed the film to their students reported receiving disclosures of abuse. Because many of the teachers said they were unsure of how to deal with the disclosures, Harris and Skippon collaborated on the 1986 sequel Beyond the Scare. Kids Can Say No! encourages children to report abuse they experience and Beyond the Scare advises teachers about what to do if a child makes such a disclosure.

Beyond the Scare, filmed in a North London school, consists of role-playing scenes with actual teachers. The film instructs teachers to listen to the child, to discuss the incident with the child's parents and to contact the appropriate authorities. The Tavistock Clinic helped with the film's production, and an expert from the organisation appears on-camera to promote child protection projects in schools. Although Harris appears in Beyond the Scare, his role is less prominent than in Kids Can Say No! and his activism against child abuse ended soon afterwards.

== Harris' trial ==
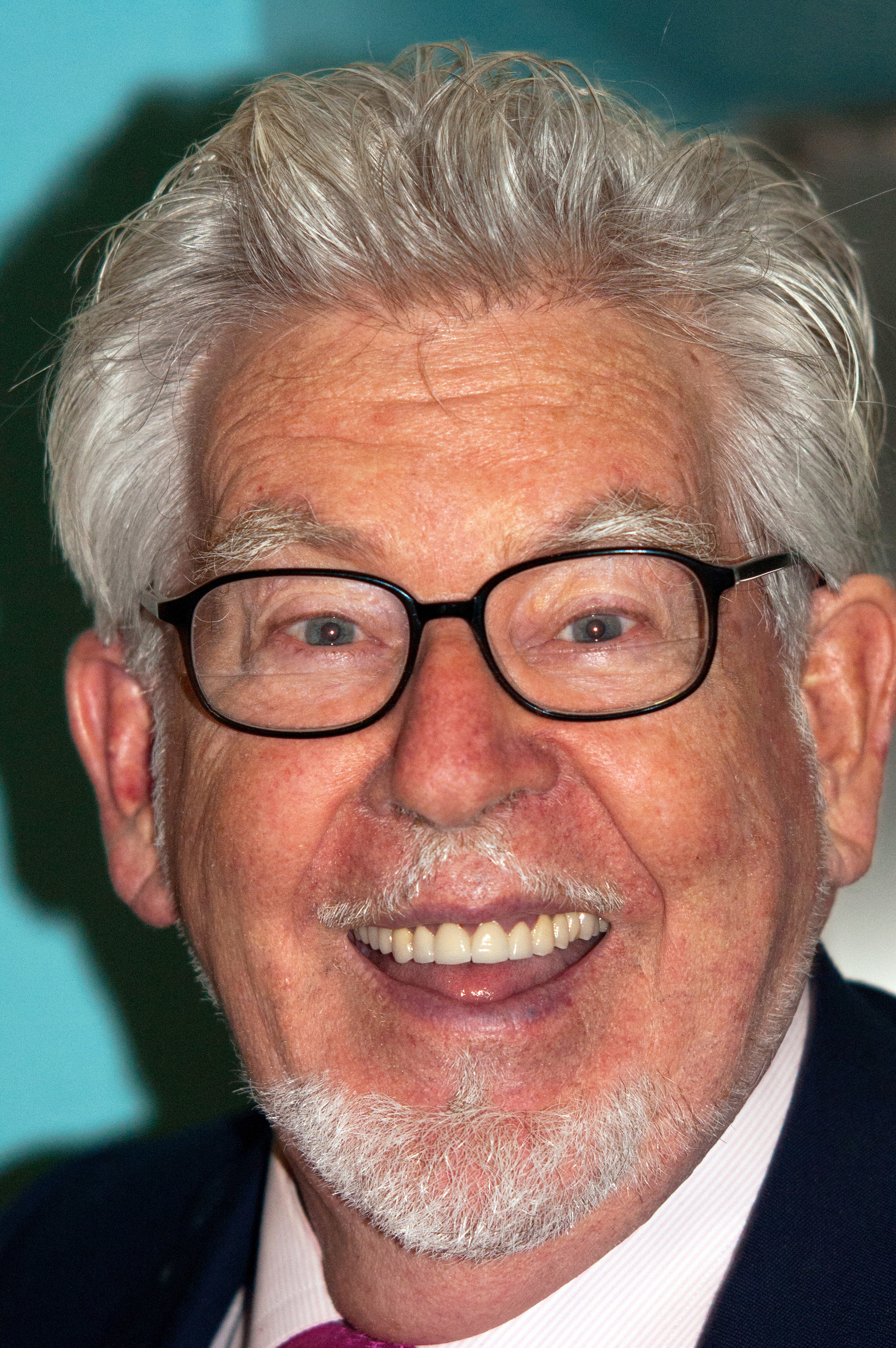
In 2014, Harris was convicted of twelve counts of indecent assault against four young girls, having committed nine counts before the 1985 release of Kids Can Say No!

Kids Can Say No! resurfaced in 2014 when Harris, then 83 years old, was prosecuted for twelve counts of indecent assault between 1968 and 1986 against four young girls; the youngest was seven years old. The prosecutors found Kids Can Say No! on YouTube and wanted to show it at trial for its unintentional irony, but the film was ruled irrelevant to the case and not admitted as evidence.

After the trial began, Jessica Skippon issued a legal warning to media outlets not to use the film without written permission. The director wrote to The Independent that no complaints were made against Harris during the making of the film. In an article about the allegations against Harris, The Sunday Telegraph noted that Kids Can Say No! was commissioned by the NSPCC; an NSPCC spokesperson responded, "The film was made independently by Rolf Harris and a film company nearly 30 years ago ... We did not commission it, fund it, make it or distribute it".

Southwark Crown Court found Harris guilty of all twelve counts of indecent assault. During the trial, it was discovered that, while making Kids Can Say No!, Harris was sexually abusing his daughter Bindi's best friend; the relationship began when the victim was 13 years old and lasted for 15 years. Harris had committed nine of the twelve counts by the film's release, including the assault of fifteen-year-old Tonya Lee in London three months before the release. The first complainant was about the age of the children in Kids Can Say No!, although the conviction related to this count was quashed in 2017. The last assault of which Harris was convicted occurred several weeks after his meeting with officials in Western Australia to propose another film about child sexual abuse. A former child actor from the Barbara Speake Stage School who appeared in Kids Can Say No! said that Harris' behavior with older girls at the school made Harris' eventual arrest unsurprising.

== Reception ==
Reviews of Kids Can Say No! have generally been negative, with initial reviews doubting the benefit of showing the film to children and later reviews focusing on Harris' hypocrisy. In a 1985 Times review, Caroline Moorehead writes that the film's avoidance of an explicit discussion of sexual abuse was both a requirement and the film's greatest weakness. According to Moorehead, an explicit discussion might have terrified children and prevented parents from consenting to their children's viewing of the film; however, its oblique approach prevents children from understanding the issue. She calls the film's theme song "catchy, one of those irritating snatches of music that is hard to forget".

The Times obtained opinions from four sexual-abuse experts, who unanimously opposed using Kids Can Say No! or any other film to teach children about the subject. Northampton social worker Helen Kenward said that she would not show the film to children. Psychiatrist Brendan McCarthy called it simplistic. According to teacher Clare Rankin, children under five would not understand the film. Physician Paula Drummond was concerned that it might inspire children to falsely accuse adults they disliked, although McCarthy said that children were unlikely to make false abuse accusations. McCarthy was especially critical of the film, calling it "no clearer to a child than the Gorbachev-Reagan talks". Moorehead summarised the experts' comments as suggesting that Kids Can Say No! is "muddling, evasive and pussy-footed, best not for children at all, but as ... aids for parents and professional workers to alert them to paedophilia and incest".

In a 1988 Sydney Morning Herald review, Judith Whelan writes that Harris is more serious in the film than he was when performing "Jake the Peg". According to Whelan, the film "would best be seen by children in a group, with an adult (teacher or parent) nearby who could encourage discussion after the show or answer children's questions during it".

When Kids Can Say No! resurfaced in 2014, Peter Walker wrote in The Guardian that the film "illustrates with grim eloquence, in retrospect, the prosecution notion that [Harris] was a man of two distinct sides: the avuncular and trustworthy public figure, and lurking behind, the groper and abuser". Walker notes that the scene in which a man assaults his child's friend mirrors what Harris did to his daughter's best friend, and that the closing sequence has "an accidental resonance that would only emerge more than 25 years later" because of the two police officers behind Harris.

According to Richard Guilliatt and Jacquelin Magnay in an article in The Australian, Harris' campaign against paedophilia in Kids Can Say No! can "be seen in retrospect as either monumental self-delusion or a sign of deep, self-lacerating guilt". NSPCC chief executive officer Peter Wanless appeared on Good Morning Britain saying that Harris' appearance in the film was hypocritical.
