= Manitoba Theatre for Young People =

- The MTYP
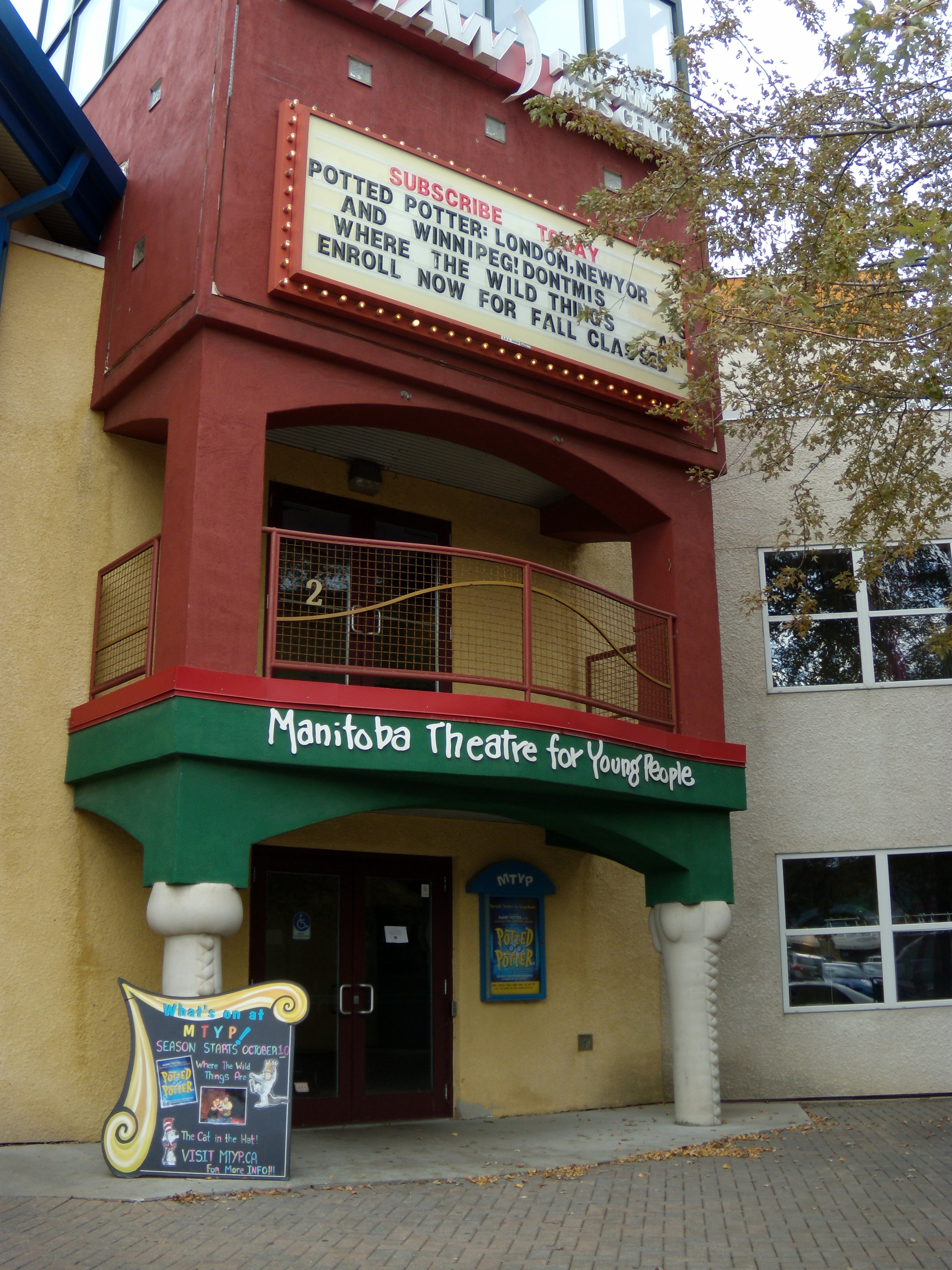
- Interactive map of Manitoba Theatre for Young People
- Address: 2 Forks Market Road; Winnipeg, Manitoba; R3C 4X1
- Coordinates: 49°53′17.3″N 97°7′59.08″W
- Capacity: 315
- Type: Theatre

Construction
- Opened: 1999
- Years active: 1982–present

Website
- mtyp.ca

Manitoba Theatre for Young People (MTYP) is a theatre for children and young adults in The Forks area of Winnipeg, Manitoba, Canada. As of 2012, MTYP's annual attendance regularly exceeds 100,000.

Within the theatre complex are two performance venues: a 315-seat Main Stage and a smaller hall. The smaller hall does not have theatre seating and is used primarily as a rehearsal hall and multi-purpose room. The building also features four classroom studios, production and wardrobe shops, a greenroom, two full dressing rooms, a box office, and lobby. The theatre is 5,270 square feet in size with a 1,344 square feet stage area. The black-box style theatre seats up to 315 and is reconfigurable.

Manitoba Theatre for Young People is one of only two TYA (Theatre for Young Audiences) institutions in Canada with a permanent residence, and is the only one that offers a full season of plays for teens.

== History ==
The theatre was founded in 1965 as Actors' Showcase, and incorporated in 1977. In 1982, Leslee Silverman became the Artistic Director, and MTYP became a professional theatre devoted to young people.

For many years, the theatre operated out of the Gas Station Theatre in the Osborne Village area of the city.

In 1999 the MTYP moved to the Canwest Performing Arts Centre (now the Shaw Performing Arts Center), a 28,000 square feet (2,600 m^{2}) facility in The Forks, built to house the theatre and its school.

Derek Aasland served as Artistic Director from 2012 to 2014 plus 2015 programming during the theatre's dramatic financial turn around, "leading the theatre away from a financial cliff to a $137,000 surplus for the 2012-13 season.". Artistic Director Leaving MTYP In Good Shape (Wpg Fee Press).

Pablo Felices-Luna has been the Artistic Director since 2014.

=== First season (1982/83) ===
- The Little Beast
- Plum Pudding
- You're a Good Man, Charlie Brown
- School Yard Games
- Crying to Laugh
- Magic & the Supernatural in Shakespeare
- Special Project: Feeling Yes, Feeling No: A Child Sexual Abuse Prevention Program

== Programs ==
The Manitoba Theatre for Young People presents a full season of theatre for young audiences via both public and school shows, as well as two productions per year that tour both the city of Winnipeg and the province of Manitoba.

MTYP's Theatre School offers fall, winter, and spring sessions, as well as spring break and summer camps, including classes for children as young as three-years-old. The theatre school serves over 1,600 children and teens. MTYP's Theatre School provides training for absolute beginners through to pre-professionals, including annual productions performed by teen students in its Young Company and Shakespeare Company, along with various extracurricular performances. The theatre's drama outreach program presents performance workshops at the theatre and in schools province wide.

MTYP offers free acting, performing, and film training classes to Winnipeg's Indigenous youth between the ages of 12 and 18. It is run by theatre artist Ian Ross and runs as an independent division of MTYP. The program sees more than 500 students and is the largest of its kind in Canada. Cultural Connections for Youth (CCAY) supplies more than half of the funding for MTYP's Aboriginal Arts Program.

== Finances ==
As of 2012, the operating budget for the MTYP is $2.2 million. Fundraising accounts for 20% of revenue, government grants for 30%, and earned revenue for 50%. Earned revenue consists of theatre tuition, ticket sales, and facility rentals.

The current facility cost $5.6 million to build. Although $4 million was raised in a capital campaign, the remainder wasn't completed and as of 2012, the theatre has $182,000 in mortgage payments annually, as there is $1.2 million remaining debt that the theatre owes for the facility.

Between 2006 and 2011, MTYP's then finance and administration manager Kathleen Owen-Hunt embezzled over $90,000 from the theatre. MTYP sued Owen-Hunt and expected to recoup a portion of the money.

== Awards ==
The theatre and its artistic director Leslee Silverman have been awarded the following honours:

- In 1991, Silverman was awarded the 125th Commemorative Medal as part of Canada’s 125th Anniversary celebrations.
- It was the first English theatre to win the Canadian Institute of the Arts for Young Audiences Award in 1992.
- MTYP's 1994 production of Comet in Moominland was nominated for the Chalmers Award.
- MTYP's 1998 production of Old Friends received the Chalmers Award.
- In 2001, Silverman received the YWCA Woman of Distinction Award in the Arts and Culture category for "her significant contribution to the well-being our community."
- In 2003 Silverman received the first Arts Award of Distinction from the Manitoba Arts Council.
- In 2004, Silverman was named an honorary member of the Association for Canadian Theatre Research (ACTR).
- In 2007, MTYP's production of Comet in Moominland was invited to open the season at New York's New Victory Theater.
- In 2007, MTYP's production of Comet in Moominland won a Dora Mavor Moore Award for Outstanding Production in the Theatre for Young Audiences category.
- In 2010, MTYP received the Human Rights Commitment Award for "the achievement of promoting human rights and social transformation for almost 30 years."
- In 2011 Silverman was awarded the Governor General's Performing Arts Award for Lifetime Achievement.

== Alumni ==
Notable former students of MTYP's theatre school include Adam Beach and Nia Vardalos.
