= Wurtele =

Wurtele or Würtele is the surname of the following people:

- Heather Wurtele (born 1979), Canadian triathlete
- Jonathan Würtele (1792–1853), Canadian merchant and political figure
- Jonathan Saxton Campbell Würtele (1828–1904), Canadian lawyer, judge and political figure, son of Jonathan
- Peter Würtele (b. 1959), German motorcycle speedway rider
- Rhona and Rhoda Wurtele (born 1922), identical twins and Canadian alpine skiers
- Sandy K. Wurtele (?) American psychologist specializing in the prevention of childhood sexual abuse
