= Rolf on Art =

- Starring: Rolf Harris
- Country of origin: United Kingdom
- Original language: English
- No. of series: 5
- No. of episodes: 28

Production
- Running time: 30 minutes

Original release
- Network: BBC
- Release: 18 November 2001 – 30 December 2007

Rolf on Art was a British art television series made by the BBC. It was hosted by Rolf Harris, the Australian television presenter. The series began in 2001, and the most recent episode was made in 2007. It was followed by Harris's other art programme, Star Portraits with Rolf Harris, which was released after the success of Rolf on Art.

Each episode revolved around Harris looking at a various notable artist from history, and both investigating their life as well as imitating their style of art.

== Rolf Harris's style ==
Unlike many other art presenters, Harris did not just look and talk about an artist's work: he created works in their own style. This was a key part of the shows' success. For each episode, he usually painted two pictures in their style, normally in the same place where they created their works. Some episodes were big events, which were held in a public place, such as Trafalgar Square in London. Harris presented these but many other people (both celebrities and the general public) were enlisted to paint.

== Episodes ==
=== Series One – The Impressionists ===
In the first series, from 2001, Harris looked at the Impressionists, a group he has a great affinity for:

1. Claude Monet
2. Edgar Degas
3. Vincent van Gogh
4. Paul Gauguin

=== Series Two – The Post-Impressionists ===
In the second series, he looked at several artists who worked around and after the time of the Impressionists, but were not Impressionists.

1. Henri Rousseau – the French painter of 2D Jungle scenes
2. Henri de Toulouse-Lautrec – the French painter of the Moulin Rouge
3. Gustav Klimt – the artist who worked in gold leaf
4. Auguste Rodin – the famous sculptor

=== Series Three – 20th-century Masters ===
1. L. S. Lowry – the British painter famous for his stick men style
2. Salvador Dalí – the most famous Surrealist
3. Pablo Picasso – the famous Cubist
4. Paul Cézanne – the French Post-Impressionist
5. Marc Chagall – the painter of love scenes
6. Andy Warhol – the famous Pop artist

=== Series Four – Old Masters ===
1. The Big Event ~ John Constable
2. Rembrandt van Rijn
3. Sandro Botticelli
4. J. M. W. Turner
5. Bruegel

=== The Christmas Special ===
In this special, Harris looked at Christmas card making. The card he produced was mass-produced and sold for charity that year.

=== The Africa Special ===
Harris went on a tour of Africa, looking at different styles on African art, including rock art, Makonde wood carving and Benin Bronzes. It was released to coincide with the Live 8 festival in 2005 and the series of programmes on the BBC about Africa.

=== Series Five – Old Masters ===
1. The Big Event ~ Leonardo da Vinci
2. Thomas Gainsborough
3. Vermeer
4. Goya
5. The Big Event ~ Hans Holbein

=== The Queen, by Rolf ===
This special, broadcast on BBC One on 1 January 2006, showed the creation of Harris's 80th birthday portrait painting of Queen Elizabeth II. It was highly publicised because the Queen had never been seen on such a programme before. In it, Harris goes to Buckingham Palace where he meets the Queen and paints her in an impressionist style. It is debatable whether it was a part of the Rolf on Art series, because it does not contain the title sequence or Rolf on Art in the title. However, it was advertised as a Rolf on Art special.

=== Rolf on Lowry ===
A one-off special, aired on 4 March 2007, where Harris followed in the footsteps of the painter L. S. Lowry. This is different from the season three episode on Lowry.

=== Rolf on Beatrix Potter ===
A one-off special, aired on 30 December 2007. Harris looked at the work of illustrator Beatrix Potter.

=== Rolf on Welsh Art ===
This series was commissioned by and only shown on BBC One Wales. It aired from 16 February to 9 March 2011. It took the same format as the original series, with each episode focusing on a different Welsh artist. The episode on Shani Rhys James was the first profile of a living artist, meaning as part of the programme Harris was able to meet the artist herself.

1. Sir Kyffin Williams
2. Josef Herman
3. Shani Rhys James
4. Graham Sutherland

The second series began airing on 12 October 2012 but has since ended following Harris's 2013 arrest on charges of indecent assault making indecent images of a child.

1. Gren Jones
2. Augustus John
3. Evan Walters
4. Brenda Chamberlain

== Book ==
A Rolf on Art book was released for the first series. It contained sections on how he worked, as well as a section on each of the artists he looked at in the series. An updated version was released for the second series.
