= Dirt Eaters =

Dirt Eaters may refer to:

- The Dirt Eaters (EP), an EP by His Name Is Alive
- A novel in The Longlight Legacy by Dennis Foon
