= George Frederick Harris (painter) =

Welsh artist (1856–1924)

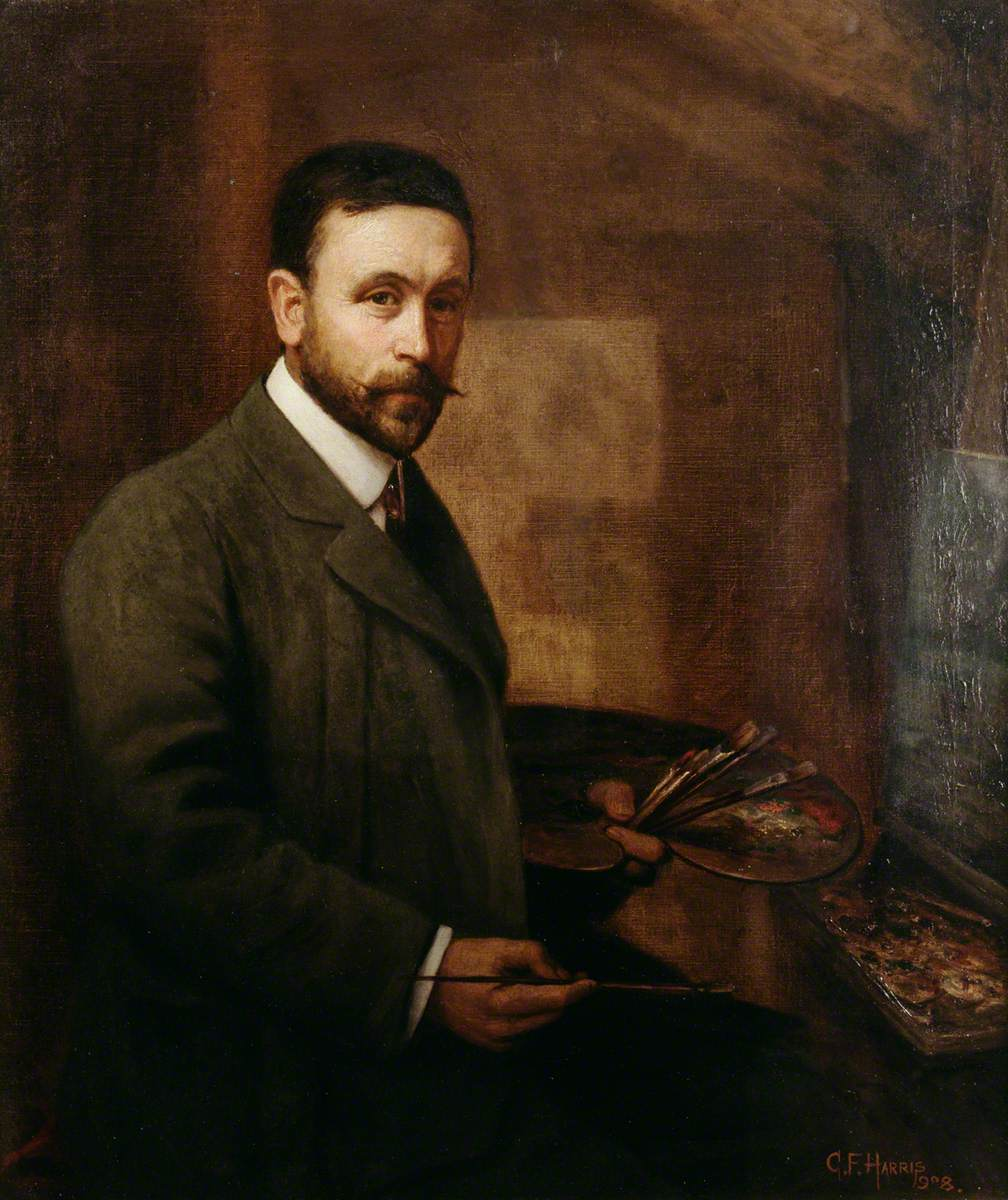
- Self Portrait of Harris, 1908
- Born: 30 October 1856; Birmingham, Warwickshire, UK
- Died: 14 June 1924 (aged 67); Sydney, Australia
- Known for: Painting, drawing
- Spouses: Jemima Reid Bowmen (m. 1882; div. 1901) Rosetta Elizabeth Lucas (m. 1901)
- Relatives: Pixie O'Harris (daughter), Rolf Harris (grandson)

George Frederick Harris (30 October 1856 – 14 June 1924) was a Welsh portrait and landscape painter. He was born in Birmingham, West Midlands, UK. Harris lived in Merthyr Tydfil, Wales for most of his life, before emigrating to Australia in 1920. He died in Sydney, Australia of myocarditis and pneumonia.

== Family ==
Harris married Jemima Reid Bowmen in Chelmsford, Essex, UK in August 1882. They had two children Claude Harris and Ethel Harris. After Harris divorced Jemima, he married Rosetta Elizabeth Lucas in 1901 and had nine children. Among George's notable descendants are his daughter Pixie O'Harris, a children's book author and illustrator, and his grandson Rolf Harris, who was an entertainer, musician and painter.

== Life ==
Harris was a chairman and secretary of the South Wales Art Society, Cardiff, Wales, and had a business of portrait and photography in Merthyr Tydfil, Wales before emigrating to Australia in 1920.

Harris was a Freemason and was the Founding Master of Fforest Lodge No. 2606 in Treharris at its consecration in 1896.

== Collections ==
The Cyfarthfa Castle Museum & Art Gallery, Merthyr Tydfil holds a collection of portraits by George Frederick Harris.

Two of G. F. Harris's paintings, dated 1893 and 1896, were auctioned by Bonhams auctioneers in 2005. There are over 40 paintings attributed to Harris now held by public bodies or in public art collections.
