= Feeling Yes, Feeling No =

- The three main characters in the film series
- Directed by: Moira Simpson
- Written by: Dennis Foon; Wendy Van Reisen; Fran Gebhard
- Produced by: Moira Simpson
- Production company: National Film Board of Canada
- Distributed by: National Film Board of Canada
- Release date: 1984
- Country: Canada
- Languages: English and French

Feeling Yes, Feeling No (French: Mon corps, c'est mon corps) is a film series produced and distributed by the National Film Board of Canada to teach children between the ages of six and twelve to avoid being sexually assaulted by people they trust, family members, and strangers. The films consist of recordings of a play that began development in 1980 in Vancouver, British Columbia, by Green Thumb Theatre. Dennis Foon, Wendy Van Reisen, and Fran Gebhard finished writing the play in 1982. Initially performed in workshops with children, the play was very successful. The filmed version of the play consists of four films directed by Moira Simpson and released in 1984 along with accompanying printed matter intended to be used together as a sexual assault prevention program. The program is six hours long and explains the difference between good and bad physical intimacy. The series uses the terms 'yes' feelings and 'no' feelings and focuses on role-playing. The program was first implemented in primary schools in British Columbia and later spread to other Canadian provinces. In a 1991 study, 286 children in grades three and four went through the program and another 113 children were used as a control group. The study found that the children who went through the program had greater knowledge about sexual assault than the control children, and that the children who went through the program were slightly better than the control children at distinguishing between safe and unsafe situations.

== Bibliography ==
- Bedard-Bidwell, Betty (2001). Hand in Hand II: An Art/Play Therapist's Treasure Chest. General Store Publishing House. ISBN 978-1894263399.
- De Chesnay, Mary (2005). Caring for the Vulnerable: Perspectives in Nursing Theory, Practice, and Research. Jones & Bartlett Learning. ISBN 978-0763747640.
- Evans, Gary (1991). In the National Interest: A Chronicle of the National Film Board of Canada from 1949 to 1989. University of Toronto Press. ISBN 978-0802068330.
- Harris, Frann (1997). Martensville: Truth Or Justice?. Dundurn Press. ISBN 978-1550022971.
- Holmberg, Arthur; Carlos Solorzano (2014). World Encyclopedia of Contemporary Theatre. Vol. 2. Routledge. ISBN 978-1136118364.
- Lerner, Loren Ruth (1997). Canadian Film and Video. University of Toronto Press. ISBN 978-0802029881.
- MacDougall, Jyl (1993). Violence in the Schools: Programs and Policies for Prevention. Canadian Education Association. ISBN 978-0920315620.
- McCalpin, Deborah J.; Joy W. Hunter (1988). Health Media Review Index, 1984-86: A Guide to Reviews and Descriptions of Commercially Available Nonprint Material for the Medical, Mental, Allied Health, Human Service, and Related Counseling Professions. Rowman & Littlefield. ISBN 978-0810821729.
- Selman, Jan; Jane Heather (2015). Theatre, Teens, Sex Ed: Are We There Yet?. University of Alberta Press. ISBN 978-1772120349.
- Wurtele, Sandy K.; Cindy L. Miller-Perrin (1993). Preventing Child Sexual Abuse: Sharing the Responsibility. University of Nebraska Press. ISBN 978-0803297500.
