= Her Majesty Queen Elizabeth II – An 80th Birthday Portrait =

2005 painting by Rolf Harris

- Artist: Rolf Harris
- Year: 2005
- Type: Painting
- Medium: Oil on canvas
- Subject: Elizabeth II
- Condition: Unknown
- Owner: Unknown

Her Majesty Queen Elizabeth II – An 80th Birthday Portrait is a 2005 oil painting of Queen Elizabeth II by Rolf Harris, commissioned by the BBC for the Queen's 80th birthday. It was unveiled at the Queen's Gallery in Buckingham Palace and publicly displayed there from 2005 to 2006. A BBC television special about its creation, The Queen, by Rolf, was broadcast on BBC One on 1 January 2006. The painting was voted the second-most-favoured portrait of the Queen by the British public, but it was critically derided.

Rolf Harris was a popular entertainer on British TV, and was the presenter of Rolf on Art, a BBC series on artists. He took two months to complete the portrait: two sittings were held at Buckingham Palace in the summer of 2005, filmed by the BBC; the rest of the painting was completed at Harris' own art studio. The portrait, measuring 100 centimetres (39 in) × 50 centimetres (20 in), is of the Queen wearing a turquoise dress and is painted in oil. After he completed the portrait, Harris' reputation as an artist and the value of his works increased, and he was appointed a Commander of the Most Excellent Order of the British Empire (CBE). The award was annulled following his conviction for indecent assault and sexual offences. The ownership and current location of the portrait is unknown.

== Background ==
The painting was commissioned by the BBC, and subsequently unveiled at the Queen's Gallery in Buckingham Palace and publicly displayed there from 20 December 2005 to 11 June 2006. A BBC television special about its creation, The Queen, by Rolf, was broadcast on BBC One on 1 January 2006.

Harris had been a popular entertainer and artist for several decades in Britain at the time the portrait was commissioned, and was the presenter of Rolf on Art, a series of television programmes on notable artists of the past. Harris subsequently said of the Queen that she was "an incredible lady and it was a real pleasure to paint her. The portrait I've created aims to capture the Queen's warm and friendly personality, rather than being a very formal portrait focusing more on her official status." Harris explained to The Daily Telegraph the following year: "I was as nervous as anything. I was in a panic".

After he completed the portrait, his reputation as an artist (and the value of his works) increased. He was appointed a Commander of the Most Excellent Order of the British Empire (CBE) in 2006. Then, in 2013, he was arrested as part of Operation Yewtree, a police investigation into child sexual abuse by media celebrities, and was convicted for indecent assault and imprisoned for five years and nine months in June 2014. His art work was largely withdrawn from sale, and the CBE was cancelled and annulled.

== Painting ==
The portrait in oil of the Queen wearing a turquoise dress, measuring 100 centimetres (39 in) × 50 centimetres (20 in), took two months to complete. Two sittings were held at Buckingham Palace in the summer of 2005; Harris subsequently completed the painting at his own art studio. The two sittings were filmed by the BBC. Prior to painting the portrait, Harris said that he wanted to "get the real person rather than the state image" and intended that it would be "representational of the way the Queen looks and her obvious charm and friendly quality, rather than the very formal". Harris aimed to create an "impressionistic" as opposed to a "photographic" portrait of the Queen.

== Critical reception ==
The portrait was voted the second-most-favoured portrait of the Queen by the British public. It has been critically derided, being described by Harry Wallop in The Telegraph as depicting the Queen as a "gurning granny". Clive Aslet, writing for the same publication, described the painting as representing a "nadir" of portraiture of the Queen, saying it showed her "grinning like the monkey on top of a barrel organ". Jonathan Jones of The Guardian said, "The press conference was a sickening display of fawning over Harris and his fatuous painting, and something in me snapped. I asked him if he seriously believed that his portrait was a good work of art [...] Seeing him unveil his royal portrait felt like attending some grotesquely bland cultural rite conducted by a dystopian version of Britain in which the BBC and monarchy united to promote the inanities of Rolf Art."

== Ownership and location ==
The location and ownership of the painting are at present unknown.

The National Portrait Gallery later refused Harris's offer of the portrait. In 2012, the painting was displayed at the Walker Art Gallery in Liverpool as part of an exhibition of Harris's work. It was described by the Walker Gallery as having been part of Harris's private collection; the gallery later said that they had returned the portrait to Whitewall Galleries with whom Harris had a commercial relationship.

Following Harris's arrest and 2014 conviction for indecent assault and sexual offences, BBC News' online magazine discussed the location and ownership of the painting. It revealed that the painting was not part of the Royal Collection, having only been loaned to the Queen's Gallery for display; it was also not part of the BBC's art collection and Whitewall Galleries did not respond to requests for a comment on the portrait's ownership. The public relations company Bell Pottinger, who acted for Harris during his trial, were unable to say if Harris possessed the painting. The article reported that it was "likely to have been returned to Harris".
