= Rolf's Cartoon Club =

British children's television series (1989–1993)

- Genre: Animated television series
- Country of origin: United Kingdom
- Original language: English
- No. of seasons: 6
- No. of episodes: 151

Production
- Running time: 22 minutes

Original release
- Network: ITV (CITV)
- Release: 6 April 1989 – 28 October 1993

Rolf's Cartoon Club is a British television show presented by Rolf Harris, first broadcast on CITV between 6 April 1989 and 28 October 1993.

The show had some similarities to Harris' earlier BBC programme, Rolf's Cartoon Time, in that it saw him introducing cartoons and drawing pictures of characters from them. The cartoons shown were mostly those of Warner Bros., but included animations from Raymond Briggs and John Lasseter. Harris also explored animation techniques and gave viewers tips for making their own cartoons at home.

Rolf's Cartoon Club was, as well as being a television programme, also an actual club that viewers could join. Members received a club badge featuring the "Rolfaroo" character, as well as regular newsletters featuring information on the television programme. Lasseter was club member number one.

For much of Cartoon Club, Harris was seated in the "Cartoon Cockpit", a studio with an easel and various art and animation equipment. Part of each programme, however, was given over to the workshop, where Harris would assist a group of club members in making their own animation.

In later series, celebrity guests appeared on the programme to discuss their favourite cartoons with Harris.

Harris had been brought to ITV by Victor Glynn, then at Portman Entertainment and the programme was created by Peter Murphy, the then Head of Children's Programmes at HTV in Bristol.

== Series ==
- Series 1: 21 x 25' – 6 April 1989 – 31 August 1989
- Christmas Special – 22 December 1989
- Series 2: 22 x 25' – 3 January 1990 – 30 May 1990
- Series 3: 24 x 25' – 5 September 1990 – 27 February 1991
- Series 4: 14 x 25' – 5 September 1991 – 18 December 1991
- Series 5: 14 x 25' – 10 September 1992 – 17 December 1992
- Series 6: 11 x 25' – 9 September 1993 – 28 October 1993

(Source : ITV Network)
