= Maureen Kenny =

American psychologist

Maureen C. Kenny
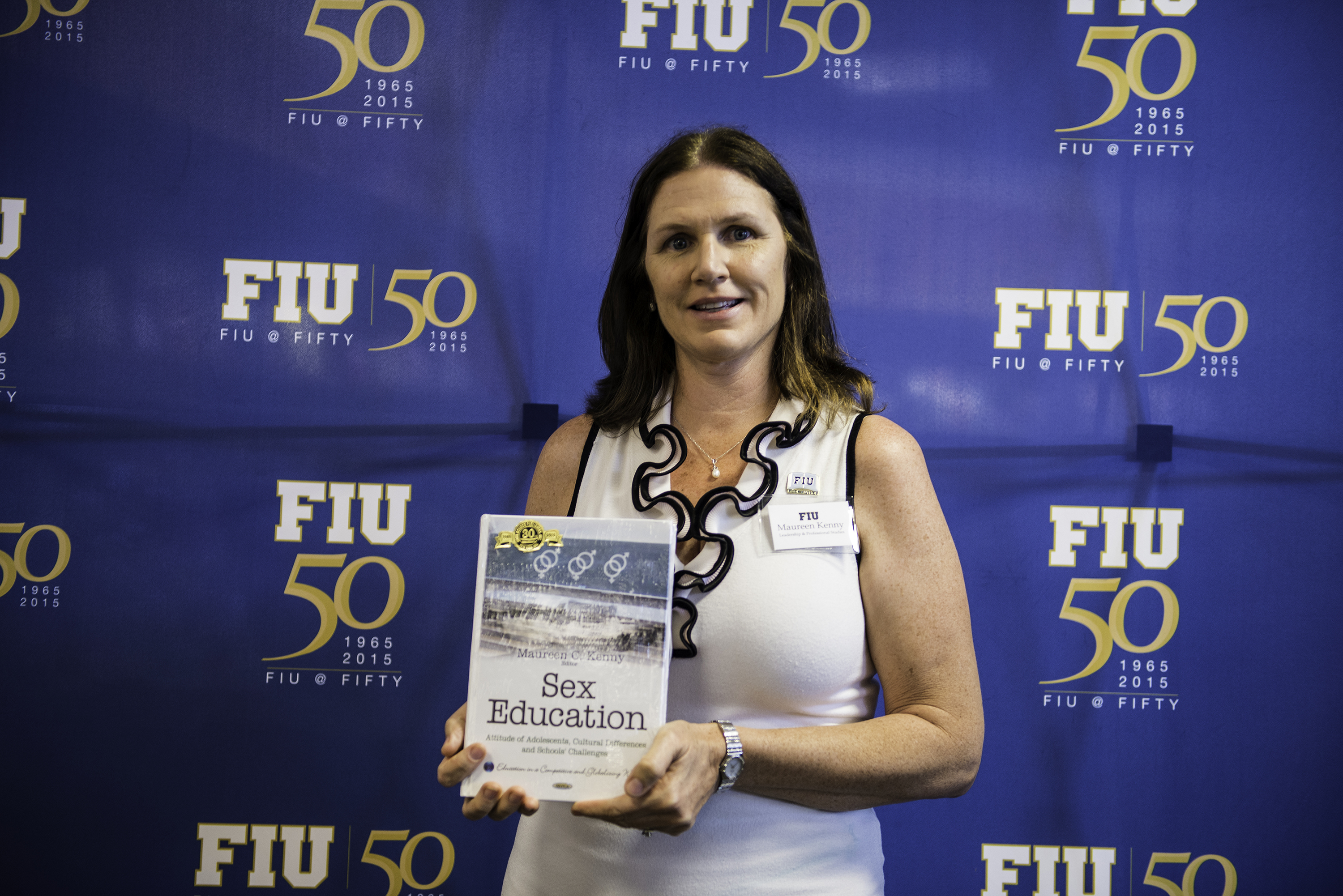
- Born: December 24, 1967 (age 58)
- Spouse: Charles B. Winick (m. 1994)

Academic background
- Education: BA, Psychology, 1989, Rutgers College; MS, Psychology, PhD, Clinical Psychology, 1994, Nova Southeastern University
- Thesis: Anxiety in physically and sexually abused children: maternal and self report (1994)

Academic work
- Institutions: Florida International University

Maureen Christina Kenny Winick (born December 24, 1967) is an American psychologist. She is a Full Professor in the Department of Psychology at Florida International University. Kenny's work has focused on examining mandatory reporters, such as teachers, compliance with their ethical and legal obligation to report suspected child maltreatment.

== Early life and education ==
Kenny was born in New York City, New York on December 24, 1967, to parents Mary and Bernard Kenny. She attended Rutgers College for her bachelor's degree and Nova Southeastern University for her graduate degrees. Her thesis was titled Anxiety in physically and sexually abused children: maternal and self report. After graduating from Nova Southeastern University, Kenny married Charles B. Winick.

== Career ==
Kenny's work has focused on examining mandatory reporters, such as teachers, compliance with their ethical and legal obligation to report suspected child maltreatment. Her work examines possible deterrents to reporting child abuse, teachers’ knowledge of signs and symptoms of abuse, and if there are any ethnic differences to reporting. Her work in this area, particularly among teachers, has highlighted the need for training and education in this area throughout a professional's career. Kenny's continued focus on this subject compared physicians and teachers and their reasons for not reporting abuse, despite being mandated, reporters. Her research in this area concluded that although physicians had more preservice training in child abuse compared to teachers, both physicians and teachers lacked knowledge about signs and symptoms of child abuse and many were under the impression that they only had to report the suspicion and not make the final determination of abuse. Her research has extended to early childhood educators, who she has found are unsure of the legal requirements of reporting child abuse but had adequate knowledge of the signs and symptoms of abuse. Kenny's work also noted the importance of continued training for providers and the need for administrative support to increase mandated reporting.

Kenny has evaluated the consequences of commercial sexual assault and found that early interventions and preventions are critical as these girls have experienced multiple traumas in their lives and display behavioral and emotional difficulties. Her research has described the group approach used by Kristi House’ Project GOLD—Girls Owning Their Lives and Dreams. The program was developed with the intention that group therapy empowers survivors to find their strengths in a nonjudgmental healing environment as they recover from their traumatic experiences.

In addition to her focus on child abuse, Kenny has provided comments on the impact of environmental traumas, including hurricanes. In 2017, Florida was struck by a category four hurricane, Irma, and Kenny noted the spike in anxiety in the community, as well as the comradery in the community banding together to help one another in the face of this storm. Kenny addressed client reactions to the hurricane, stating the difficult memories and traumas the hurricane triggered for longtime residents of South Florida. In 2018, Kenny reflected on the damage left behind when Hurricane Irma hit the summer before and spoke of the empathy that she believes has been cultivated by South Floridians as a result of this disaster.

Kenny has worked alongside Sandy K. Wurtele to recommend broad approaches to protecting children from abuse in youth-serving organizations, including screening, establishing protection policies and procedures, training, along with monitoring and supervision. In 2016, at Florida International University's annual Faculty Convocation, Kenny was awarded the Faculty Award for Excellence in Service recognizing her commitment for service, demonstration of distinguished leadership, and mentorship at the university. In 2020, Kenny was the recipient of the inaugural Child and Family Citizen Psychologist Award from the American Psychological Association for her research on child abuse.

== Selected publications ==
- Kenny, M. (2015). Sex Education: Attitude of Adolescents, Cultural Differences and Schools' Challenges.
- Moursand, J. & Kenny, M. (2002). The Process of Counseling and Psychotherapy (4th ed).
- Schulze, R. & Kenny, M. (2023). Basic Counseling Skills for Higher Education Professionals: Identifying and Addressing Mental Health Concerns.NASPA
