= Pixie O'Harris =

Australian artist and writer (1903–1991)

Pixie O'Harris MBE
- Born: Rhona Olive Harris; 15 October 1903; Cardiff, Wales, United Kingdom
- Died: 17 November 1991 (aged 88); Sydney, Australia
- Occupations: Author, artist, illustrator, broadcaster
- Spouse: Bruce Pratt (m. 1928)
- Writing career
- Pen name: Pixie O'Harris

Pixie O'Harris MBE (born Rhona Olive Harris; 15 October 1903 – 17 November 1991), earlier known as Pixie O. Harris, was a Welsh-born Australian artist, newspaper, magazine and book illustrator, author, broadcaster, caricaturist and cartoonist, designer of book plates, sheet music covers and stationery, and children's hospital ward fairy-style mural painter. She became patron to Sydney's Royal Alexandra Hospital for Children in 1977.

== Early life ==
Rhona Olive Harris was the daughter of George Frederick Harris, chairman of the Royal Art Society Cardiff, Wales, and Rosetta Elizabeth Harris (née Lucas). She was the fifth of nine children. Rhona was the aunt of Rolf Harris. Her brother was Cromwell Harris, who immigrated from Cardiff, Wales to Perth, Western Australia. Cromwell was the father of Rolf Harris.

She was educated at Sully village school and Allensbank Girls School in Cardiff. At age 14 she was a member of the South West Art Society. The Harris family migrated to Australia in 1920 and settled in Perth. They moved to Sydney in 1921.

Disliking her given name Rhona, and having been dubbed "the Welsh pixie" on the boat over to Australia, she became known as "Pixie".

She originally produced her professional work under the name "Pixie O. Harris"; however, following a printer's error at the Sydney Morning Herald, which printed her name as "Pixie O'Harris", she permanently used that pseudonym.

During the 1950s she completed a series of murals and paintings for the children's wards of several hospitals with her brother Olaf. Some of these were later rediscovered, restored and put on display in 2020.

== Marriage ==
On 16 July 1928 she married Bruce Pratt, the son of eminent scholar and important Congregational minister, Frederick Vicary Pratt (1870–1932) and Agnes Elizabeth Pratt (born 1872), née Waddell. He was also the editor of the Australian Encyclopaedia, and a younger brother of the artist Douglas Pratt. The couple had three daughters.

== Honours ==
In 1953 Pixie O'Harris was awarded the Queen's Coronation Medal. In 1976 she was made a Member of the Order of the British Empire (MBE). The following year she was awarded the Queen's Silver Jubilee Medal.

== Works ==
=== Written by Pixie O'Harris ===
- 1983, Was It Yesterday? The Autobiography of Pixie O'Harris, Rigby, Australia.
- 1986, Our Small Safe World: Recollections of a Welsh Childhood, Boobook Publications, Sydney, NSW.

=== Poetry (or lyrics) by Pixie O'Harris ===
- 1944, Where the Waterfall Leaps in the Gully, (music by Dorothy R. Mathlin), D. Davis & Co., Sydney, NSW.
- 1945, Pixie O'Harris Songs for Children, (music by Dorothy R. Mathlin), D. Davis & Co., Sydney, NSW.
- 1945, Where the Winding Wollondilly Flows, (music by Dorothy R. Mathlin), D. Davis & Co., Sydney, NSW.
- 1957, The Town of Flowers, Arthur H. Stockwell, Devon, UK.
- 1972, The Hunter: a Two-Part Song, (music by Colin J. Jenkins), Allans Music, Melbourne, VIC.

=== Written and illustrated by Pixie O'Harris ===
- 1923, The O.K. Fairy Book: New Rhymes and Pictures for Kiddies Only, Weston Co., Sydney, NSW.
- 1935, Pearl Pinkie and Sea Greenie: the Story of Two Little Rock-Sprites, Angus & Robertson, Sydney, NSW.
- 1940, The Pixie O'Harris Story Book, Angus & Robertson, Sydney, NSW.
- 1941, The Babes in the Wood, Cinderella, Little Red Riding Hood (3 Vols.), New Century Press, Sydney, NSW.
- 1941, The Fortunes of Poppy Treloar, Angus & Robertson, Sydney, NSW.
- 1942, Marmaduke the Possum, Angus and Robertson, Sydney, NSW.
- 1943, Goolara: Daughter of the Billabong, Currawong, Sydney, NSW.
- 1943, Rondel the Fair, Currawong, Sydney, NSW.
- 1943, The Story of Our Baby, New Century Press, Sydney, NSW.
- 1944, Rocks of Han: a Fairy Story, Currawong, Sydney, NSW.
- 1944, Poppy and the Gems, Currawong, Sydney, NSW.
- 1945, Pixie O'Harris Songs for Children, Davis, Sydney, NSW.
- 1945, The Fairy Who Wouldn't Fly, Marchant & Co., Sydney, NSW.
- 1946, Princess of China, Currawong Publishing, Sydney, NSW.
- 1947, Poppy Faces the World, Angus & Robertson, Sydney, NSW.
- 1950, Pixie O'Harris Gift Book, Dymock's, Sydney, NSW.
- 1953, Marmaduke and Margaret, Angus & Robertson, Sydney, NSW.
- 1977, Marmaduke the Possum in the Cave of the Gnomes, Angus & Robertson, Sydney, NSW.
- 1977, Birthday Book, Angus and Robertson, Sydney, NSW.
- 1978, The Teddy Bear's Picnic, Golden Press, Sydney, NSW.
- 1978, The Bunny Who Lost his Tail and The Giant's Eiderdown, Golden Press, Sydney, NSW.
- 1979, The Kangaroo Who Couldn't Hop and the Cloud Wallaby, Golden Press Sydney, NSW.
- 1980, The Pixie O'Harris Treasury of Animal Verse, Golden Press, Sydney, NSW.
- 1980, Trailing Echoes, (publisher not known), Sydney, NSW.
- 1981, The Pixie O'Harris Nursery Rhyme Book, David Ell, Sydney, NSW.
- 1982, The Little Grey Mouse and her Friends, Golden Press, Sydney, NSW.
- 1985, A Cavalcade of Cats, Methuen, Sydney, NSW.
- 1985, Loveleaves the Koala, Methuen, Sydney, NSW.
- 1988, Loveleaves Returns to the Bush, Dent, Australia.

=== Works illustrated by Pixie O'Harris ===
- Bedford, Ruth, 1934, Hundreds and Thousands, Dymock's, Sydney, NSW.
- Boughton, Joy, 1981, This Roundabout, J. Boughton, Vaucluse, NSW (Illustrated by Pixie O'Harris & Joseph H. Arman).
- Carroll, Lewis, 1990, Alice's Adventures in Wonderland, (125th Birthday Edition), Carroll Foundation, Melbourne, VIC.
- Cope, Gwen, 1936, Fairy Verse for Little Folk, Angus & Robertson, Sydney, NSW.
- Cope, Gwen, 1937, Under the Joy of the Sky, and Other Verses, Angus & Robertson, Sydney, NSW.
- Davison, Frank Dalby, 1936, Children of the Dark People: an Australian Story for Young Folk, Angus & Robertson, Sydney, NSW.
- Grahame, Kenneth, 1983, The Wind in the Willows, Rigby Ltd, Adelaide, SA.
- Griffiths, Lexie, 1945, Between Ourselves, Angus & Robertson, Sydney, NSW.
- Hemphill, Rosemary, 1959, Fragrance and Flavour: the Growing and Use of Herbs, Angus & Robertson, Sydney, NSW.
- Higgins, Kathleen, 1938, Betty in Bushland, Angus & Robertson, Sydney, NSW.
- Lister, Gladys, 1938, Little Round Garden, Angus & Robertson, Sydney, NSW.
- Lister, Gladys, 1939, Little Round House, Angus & Robertson, Sydney, NSW.
- Lister, Gladys, 1946, The House that Beckons, New Century Press, Sydney, NSW.
- Liston, Maud Renner, 1982, Cinderella's Party: A Fairy Story, Rigby Ltd, Adelaide, SA.
- Littlejohn, Agnes. 1924, The Lost Emerald and Other Stories, Edwards Dunlop, Sydney, NSW.
- Merrick, Frances, 1975, The Children's Bar Reading Book, Mrs. Frances Merrick, Roseville, NSW.
- Park, Margaret Robertson, 1940, The Secret Joy: Poems, Jackson & O'Sullivan, Brisbane, QLD.
- Pender, Lydia, 1958, Marbles in My Pocket, Writers' Press, Sydney, NSW.
- Randell, Beverley, 1969, The Baby, Kea Press, Wellington, NZ.
- Rice, Esmée, 1948, The Secret Family, Angus & Robertson, Sydney, NSW.
- Rothenberger, L. (ed.), 1968, More Star Spangled Cooking: With The American Women's Club of the American Society, Sydney, Australia, American Society, Sydney, NSW.
- Sabine, Jo, 1941, The Pillow Pat Poems, J.Sabine, Grafton, NSW.
- Tombs, John, 1945, Apple Cottage, and the Lost Key, Offset Printing Company, Sydney, NSW.
- She also illustrated stories and articles appearing in the School Magazine published by the NSW Department of Education. The issues of February, April and July 1947 contain examples.

== Memorial ==
=== APA Pixie O’Harris Award ===
Is awarded for "Distinguished and Dedicated Service to the Development and Reputation of Australian Children’s Books".
