= Rolf Harris =

Australian entertainer (1930–2023)

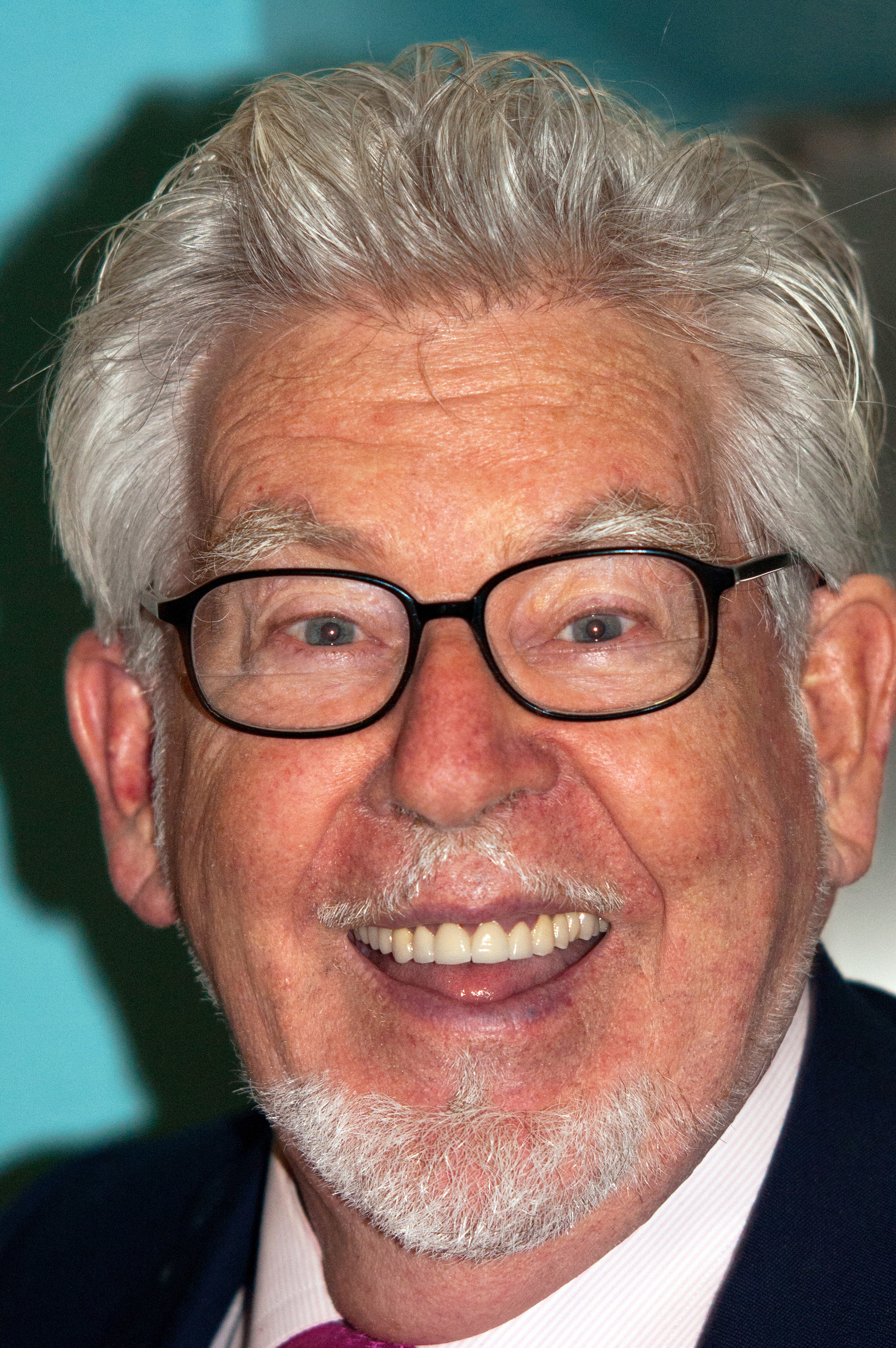
- Harris in 2010
- Born: 30 March 1930; Bassendean, Western Australia, Australia
- Died: 10 May 2023 (aged 93); Bray, Berkshire, England
- Education: University of Western Australia (BA); Claremont Teachers' College
- Occupations: Entertainer; musician; composer; television personality; painter; actor; presenter
- Years active: 1953–2014
- Criminal charges: Indecent assault
- Criminal penalty: 5 years, 9 months' imprisonment
- Spouse: Alwen Hughes (m. 1958)
- Children: 1
- Relatives: Pixie O'Harris (aunt); George Frederick Harris (grandfather)

Rolf Harris (30 March 1930 – 10 May 2023) was an Australian musician, television personality, painter, and actor. He used a variety of instruments in his performances, notably the didgeridoo and the Stylophone, and is credited with the invention of the wobble board. He was convicted in England in 2014 of the sexual assault of four underage girls.

Harris began his entertainment career in 1953, releasing several songs, including "Tie Me Kangaroo Down, Sport" (a Top 10 hit in Australia, the UK and the United States), "Sun Arise", "Jake the Peg" and "Two Little Boys", which reached number 1 in the UK. From the 1960s, Harris was a successful television personality in the UK, later presenting shows such as Rolf's Cartoon Club and Animal Hospital. In 1985, he hosted the short educational film Kids Can Say No!, which warned children between ages five and eight how to avoid situations where they might be sexually abused, how to escape such situations and how to get help if they are abused. In 2005, he painted an official portrait of Queen Elizabeth II.

After the Jimmy Savile sexual abuse scandal, Harris was arrested as part of the Operation Yewtree police investigation regarding historical allegations of sexual offences in 2013. Harris denied any wrongdoing and was placed on trial in 2014. In July 2014, Harris was sentenced to five years and nine months in prison after being convicted on twelve counts of indecent assault on four female victims, who were between the ages of eight and nineteen at the time that the offences took place between the 1960s and 1980s. Following his conviction, he was stripped of many of his honours and re-runs of his television programmes were pulled from syndication.

Harris was released on licence in 2017 after serving nearly three years at HM Prison Stafford. The conviction involving an eight-year-old girl in Portsmouth was overturned as unsafe in 2017. He applied for permission to appeal against his convictions concerning the three other girls, but this was refused.

== Early life ==
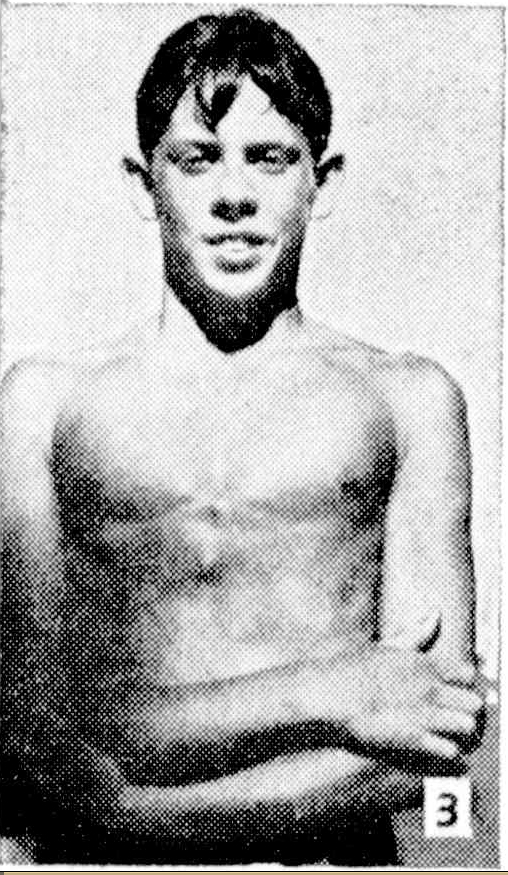
At 14 he swam the fastest time, swimming from scratch, in the "Swim through Bassendean" handicap race, 27 January 1945.

Harris was born on 30 March 1930 in Bassendean, a suburb of Perth, Western Australia, to Agnes Margaret (née Robbins) and Cromwell ("Crom") Harris, who had both emigrated from Cardiff, Wales. He was named after Rolf Boldrewood, the pseudonym of an Australian writer whom his mother admired. After his later fame, Harris was often referred to within Australia as "the boy from Bassendean". As a child, he owned a dog called Buster Fleabags, about whom he later wrote a book (for the UK Quick Reads Initiative).

Harris attended Bassendean Primary School and Perth Modern School in Subiaco, later gaining a Bachelor of Arts from the University of Western Australia and a Diploma of Education from Claremont Teachers' College. When he was 16, and still a student at Perth Modern School, his self-portrait in oils was one of the 80 works (out of 200 submitted) accepted to be hung in the Art Gallery of New South Wales as an entry in the 1947 Archibald Prize. He painted a portrait of the then Lieutenant Governor of Western Australia, Sir James Mitchell, for the 1948 Archibald Prize. He won the 1949 Claude Hotchin prize for oil colours with his landscape "On a May Morning, Guildford".

As an adolescent and young adult, Harris was a champion swimmer. In 1946, he was the Australian Junior 110 yards (100 metres) Backstroke Champion. He was also the Western Australian state champion over a variety of distances and strokes during the period from 1948 to 1952.

== Career in television, music, and art ==
=== 1950s ===
Harris moved to England in 1952 and became an art student at City and Guilds of London Art School in South London, aged 22. He went on to illustrate Paper Magic, Harbin's first book on origami, in 1956. In 1954, Harris was a regular on BBC Television programme Whirligig, which featured a character called "Willoughby", who sprang to life on a drawing board, but was erased at the end of each episode.

By this stage, Harris had drifted away from art school as a slightly disillusioned student. He then met his longtime hero, Australian impressionist painter Hayward Veal (1913–1968), who became his mentor, teaching him the rudiments of impressionism and showing him how it could help with his portrait painting. At the time that he was working with Veal, Harris was also entertaining with his piano accordion every Thursday night at a club called the Down Under, frequented by Australians and New Zealanders. At the Down Under venue, Harris honed his entertainment skills over several years, eventually writing what later became his theme song, "Tie Me Kangaroo Down, Sport".

Although Harris chiefly appeared on the BBC, he was also on the British ITV network, and when commercial television started in 1955, he was the only entertainer to work with both the BBC and ITV. He performed on the BBC with his own creation, Willoughby, a specially made board on which he drew Willoughby (voiced and operated by Peter Hawkins). The character would then come to life to engage in a comedic dialogue with Harris as he drew cartoons of Willoughby's antics. On Associated Rediffusion's Small Time, Harris invented a character called Oliver Polip the Octopus, which he drew on the back of his hand and animated. Harris then illustrated the character's adventures with cartoons on huge sheets of card.

Harris returned to Perth in Australia when television was introduced there in 1959 after he was headhunted. He subsequently produced and starred in five episodes of a half-hour weekly children's show, as well as his own weekly evening variety show. From 1959, he worked on TVW-7's first locally produced show, Spotlight, and during this time he recorded "Tie Me Kangaroo Down, Sport" on a single microphone placed above him in the television studio.

The song was sent to EMI in Sydney, and was released shortly afterwards as a record, becoming both his first recording and his first number one single. The song was successful in the UK. Harris offered four local backing musicians to split 10% of the royalties from the song, but they decided to take a recording fee of £7 each (equivalent to A$233 in 2022), because they did not think the song would be successful. The novelty song was originally titled "Kangalypso" and featured the distinctive sound of the "wobble board".

The fourth verse – "Let me abos go loose, Lou/Let me abos go loose/They're of no further use, Lou/So let me abos go loose" – became increasingly controversial, because of the use of what later became regarded as a racial slur, and was removed in later versions of the song. In 2006, four decades after the song's release, Harris expressed his regret about the original lyric.

=== 1960s–1980s ===
At the end of 1960, he toured Australia sponsored by Dulux paints and singing his hit song while doing huge paintings on stage with Dulux emulsion paint. While painting on stage, one of his catchphrases was, "Can you tell what it is yet?" After Harris and his wife returned to England, they visited Perth to meet family and for tours of Australia, where he spent around four months travelling with his band.

After returning to the UK in 1962, he was introduced to George Martin, who re-recorded all of his songs the following year, including a remake of "Tie Me Kangaroo Down, Sport" which became a huge hit in the US, and "Sun Arise", an Aboriginal-inspired song Harris had written with Perth naturalist Harry Butler. The song reached number two in the UK charts. Harris met and worked with the Beatles after they started recording with Martin, and he compèred their 16-night season of Christmas shows at London's Finsbury Park Astoria Theatre (later the Rainbow Theatre) in 1963. Harris sang "Tie Me Kangaroo Down, Sport", with the Beatles singing backing vocals, for the first edition of the From Us to You BBC radio show in December 1963. Harris changed the original lyrics to create a version that was specially written for the Beatles.

Harris was the presenter of Hi There and Hey Presto it's Rolf in 1964. By the time The Rolf Harris Show was broadcast in 1967, lasting until 1974, on BBC1, he had gained a high profile on British television. He was the commentator for the United Kingdom in the 1967 Eurovision Song Contest.

In March 1967, David Blanasi, an Aboriginal Australian virtuoso player and maker of the didgeridoo, travelled to London with Harris, appearing live on The Rolf Harris Show on Saturday 1 April for the first time. Blanasi taught Harris how to play the didgeridoo while on tour with him, which began an ongoing professional association.

Harris created one of his best-known characters in the 1960s, Jake the Peg, but his biggest success in terms of record sales was in 1969, with his rendering of the American Civil War song "Two Little Boys", originally written in 1902. Harris later discovered a personal poignancy to the song, as the story bears such a resemblance to the World War I experiences of his father Crom, and Crom's beloved younger brother Carl, who died aged 19 after being wounded in battle in France two weeks before the Armistice of November 1918. "Two Little Boys" was the Christmas Number One song in the UK charts for six weeks in 1969. It sold over one million copies and was awarded a gold disc.

Throughout the 1970s and early 1980s, his BBC TV programmes remained a light-entertainment staple, with the last show, Rolf on Saturday OK?, broadcast on Saturday evenings. On many of his television appearances, Harris painted pictures on large boards in an apparently slapdash manner, with the odd nonsense song thrown in, asking "Can you tell what is it yet?" as he painted. Only at the end of the song would a fully formed picture emerge, sometimes only after the board was turned through 90 or 180 degrees. Such appearances led to several television series based on his artistic ability, such as Rolf's Cartoon Time, broadcast on BBC One from 1979 to 1989, and Rolf's Cartoon Club, on CITV between 1989 and 1993.

In the early 1980s, he starred in his own weekly Australian television series, The Rolf Harris Show, produced by the ABC Television. The series featured numerous guests, including regulars such as Jane Scali. During the show, Harris would also paint Australian bush scenes.

Harris was the subject of episodes of This Is Your Life in 1971 and 1995. In 1973, Harris performed the first concert in the Concert Hall of the newly completed Sydney Opera House. In 1974, he released the single "Papillon" on EMI. He played the didgeridoo on two albums by English pop singer Kate Bush, entitled The Dreaming (1982) and Aerial (2005); he also contributed vocals to the songs "An Architect's Dream" and "The Painter's Link" on Aerial. Harris' contributions were later replaced as part of the official 2018 remaster and reissue campaign for Bush's'back catalog. Rolf Harris's spoken-word and singing parts from the tracks "An Architect's Dream" and "The Painter's Link" on the A Sky of Honey suite were removed and we re-recorded and performed by her son, Albert "Bertie" McIntosh

In 1985, Harris presented a twenty-minute child abuse prevention video called Kids Can Say No!

=== Later career ===
In the late 1980s, Harris was touring in Australia and was asked to sing his own version of Led Zeppelin's "Stairway to Heaven" for the television programme The Money or the Gun performing with his own small group; a version was released as a single in the UK in February 1993. This cover version reached number seven in the charts, which led to his appearance at the Glastonbury Festival in 1993. Harris appeared at six subsequent Glastonbury festivals—1998, 2000, 2002, 2009, 2010 and 2013—and a wobble board Harris used to perform "Stairway to Heaven" on Top of the Pops is an exhibit at the National Museum of Australia. In 2000, Harris, along with Steve Lima, released a dance track called "Fine Day", which entered the "top 30" in the UK charts at that time. A "Killie-themed" version of the song was scheduled for release in March 2007, to coincide with the Scottish football club Kilmarnock's appearance in the Scottish League Cup final after the song was adopted by the club's fans in 2003. One of the adapted lyrics referred to a hypothetical situation, in which Kilmarnock could be losing the match 5–0, and the club coincidentally lost 5–1. Harris performed "Tie Me Kangaroo Down, Sport" in 2000 with the Australian children's group the Wiggles; he was subsequently digitally removed from DVD releases after his conviction.

From 1994 to 2003, Harris was the host of the reality television programme Animal Hospital, a chronicle of a British veterinary practice. During his time hosting the series, he adopted an abandoned English Bull Terrier from the practice named "Dolly". Harris presented 19 series of Animal Hospital for BBC One and the show won the Most Popular Factual Entertainment Show award at the National TV Awards on five occasions. Harris eventually announced that it was "time to move on" at the completion of the series, which broke "the hearts of thousands of fans across the country", according to the Radio Times.

In 2001 and 2004, Harris presented Rolf on Art, a television series that highlighted the work of a selection of his favourite artists, including van Gogh, Degas, Monet and Gauguin. In November and December 2002, under the direction of Charles Saumarez Smith, London's National Gallery exhibited a collection of Harris's art.

On 26 September 2004, Harris oversaw a project to recreate John Constable's The Hay Wain painting on a large scale, with 150 people each contributing a small section. On live BBC television, each individual canvas was assembled into the full picture as part of the episode Rolf on Art: The Big Event. Also in 2004, as a part of the Rolf on Art series, Harris travelled to Lapland to design and paint a Christmas card for the "Children in Need" charity organisation.

Harris presented three series of the BBC art programme Star Portraits with Rolf Harris, with the first and second series airing in 2004 and 2005, respectively. Following the first series, a touring exhibition—featuring portraits of Cilla Black, Michael Parkinson and Adrian Edmondson—was organised with County Hall Gallery. In 2001, Harris had said he always imagined he would eventually become a portrait painter as his paternal grandfather, George Frederick Harris, had been.

Harris was commissioned to paint a portrait of Queen Elizabeth II for her 80th birthday. The painting was conducted at Buckingham Palace and was unveiled there by Harris on 19 December 2005. The painting also became the subject of a special episode of Rolf on Art. Harris explained to The Daily Telegraph the following year: "I was as nervous as anything. I was in a panic". The portrait was later voted as the second-most-favoured portrait of the Queen by the British public.

In September 2006, the Royal Australian Mint launched the first of the new 2007 Silver Kangaroo Collector's Coin series and Harris was commissioned to design the first coin of the series. In January 2007, a one-hour documentary titled A Lifetime in Paint, about Harris's work as an artist—from his early years in Australia to the present day—was screened on BBC One.

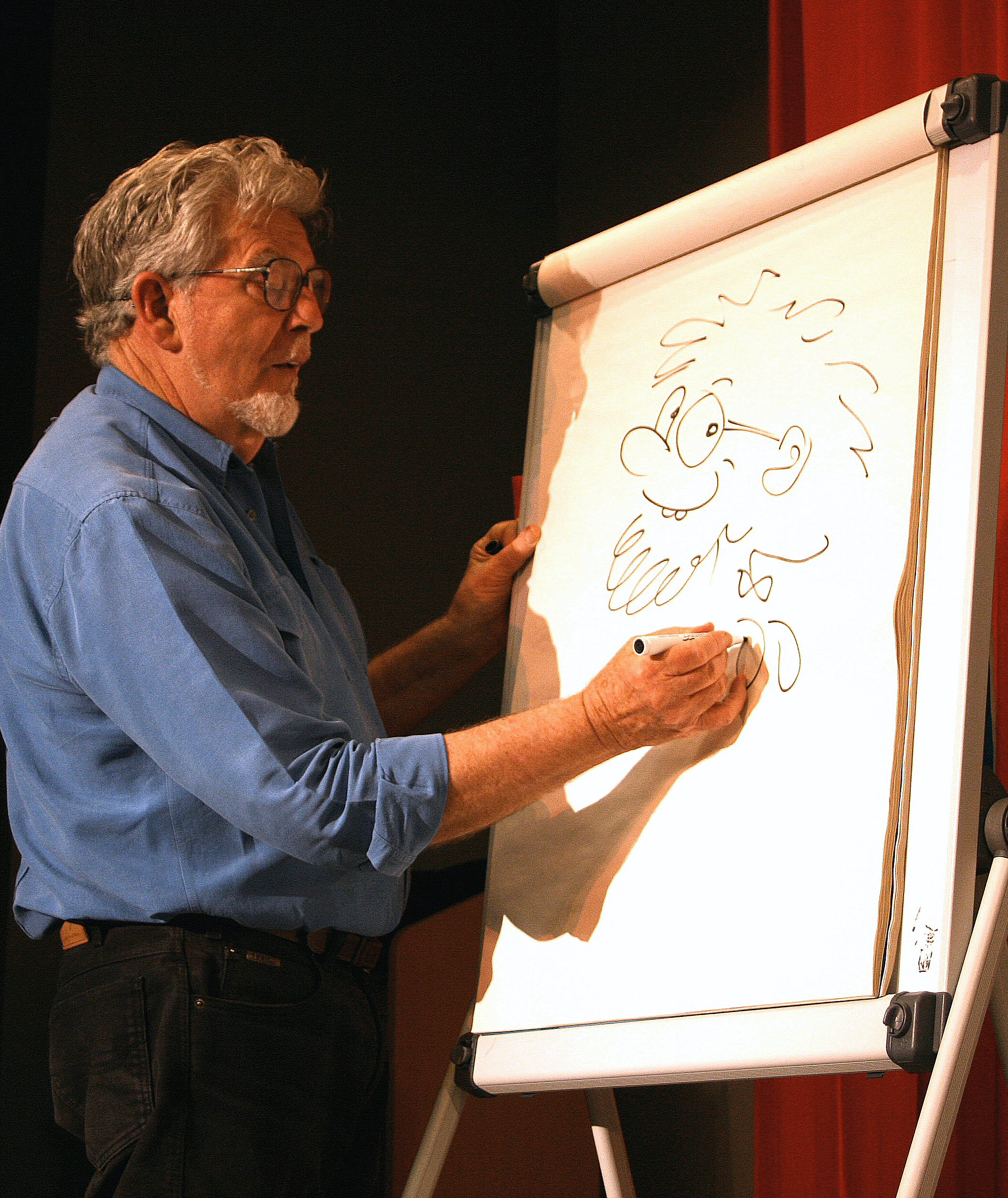
Harris sketches a "Rolfaroo" self-portrait in 2008

In 2007, Harris participated in the BBC Wales programme Coming Home, in which he discussed his Welsh family history. In December 2007, a new DVD, titled Rolf Live!, was released through his website, while Rolf on Art: Beatrix Potter was screened on BBC One during the same month. Harris appeared with a wobble board in a Churchill Insurance advertisement in 2009, and hosted the satirical quiz show Have I Got News for You in May 2009. Harris was narrator of the 2010 Australian documentary series Penguin Island, a six-part natural history documentary about the life of the little penguin. From September 2010 to October 2010, he took part in Jamie's Dream School, teaching art to a class of 20 students, followed by an appearance as himself on the Christmas special of My Family, which aired on 24 December 2010.

Harris performed on the Pyramid Stage at the Glastonbury Festival on 25 June 2010, during the festival's 40th birthday, followed by an appearance at the Bestival Festival on the Isle of Wight in September 2010. On 5 August 2011, Harris played at Wickham Festival in Wickham, Hampshire, and also appeared on the Wiggles' 2011 DVD release Ukulele Baby, singing and performing the song "Good Ship Fabulous Flea" with his wobble board. In 2011, Harris made a guest appearance on BBC One's The Magicians, hosted by Lenny Henry. On 5 November 2011, Harris appeared in an episode of Piers Morgan's Life Stories, in which he wept as he spoke about a period in which he felt his "life was over": "I didn't know what to do with myself. I didn't know what to think. I now know what people mean when they say, 'I've got clinical depression.' I'd never felt so low. There's no way to come out of the blackness. I felt out of control". Harris also stated that he regrets missing so much of his daughter's childhood.

In December 2011, Harris's portrait of Bonnie Tyler was valued at an estimated £50,000 on BBC's The Antiques Roadshow. From 19 May to 12 August 2012, a major retrospective of Harris's paintings, titled "Rolf Harris: Can You Tell What It Is Yet?", was exhibited at the Walker Art Gallery in Liverpool. The opening day yielded the busiest Saturday on record, with visitor figures peaking at 3,632.

On 2 May 2012, Harris appeared on The One Show, in which he described his artistic style as being "impressionistic". On 4 June 2012, he performed at the Queen's Diamond Jubilee Concert outside Buckingham Palace.

In October 2012, Harris started presenting a series on Channel 5, based at Liverpool University's Veterinary School, called Rolf's Animal Clinic. At the time of his arrest by British police on suspicion of sexual offences, the show was broadcasting a repeat run and was consequently ceased without any details of its future. In 2013, Channel 5 replaced Harris with former BBC host Ben Fogle and recommissioned the show under the title 'Ben Fogle's Animal Clinic'.

=== Musical recordings and experimentation ===
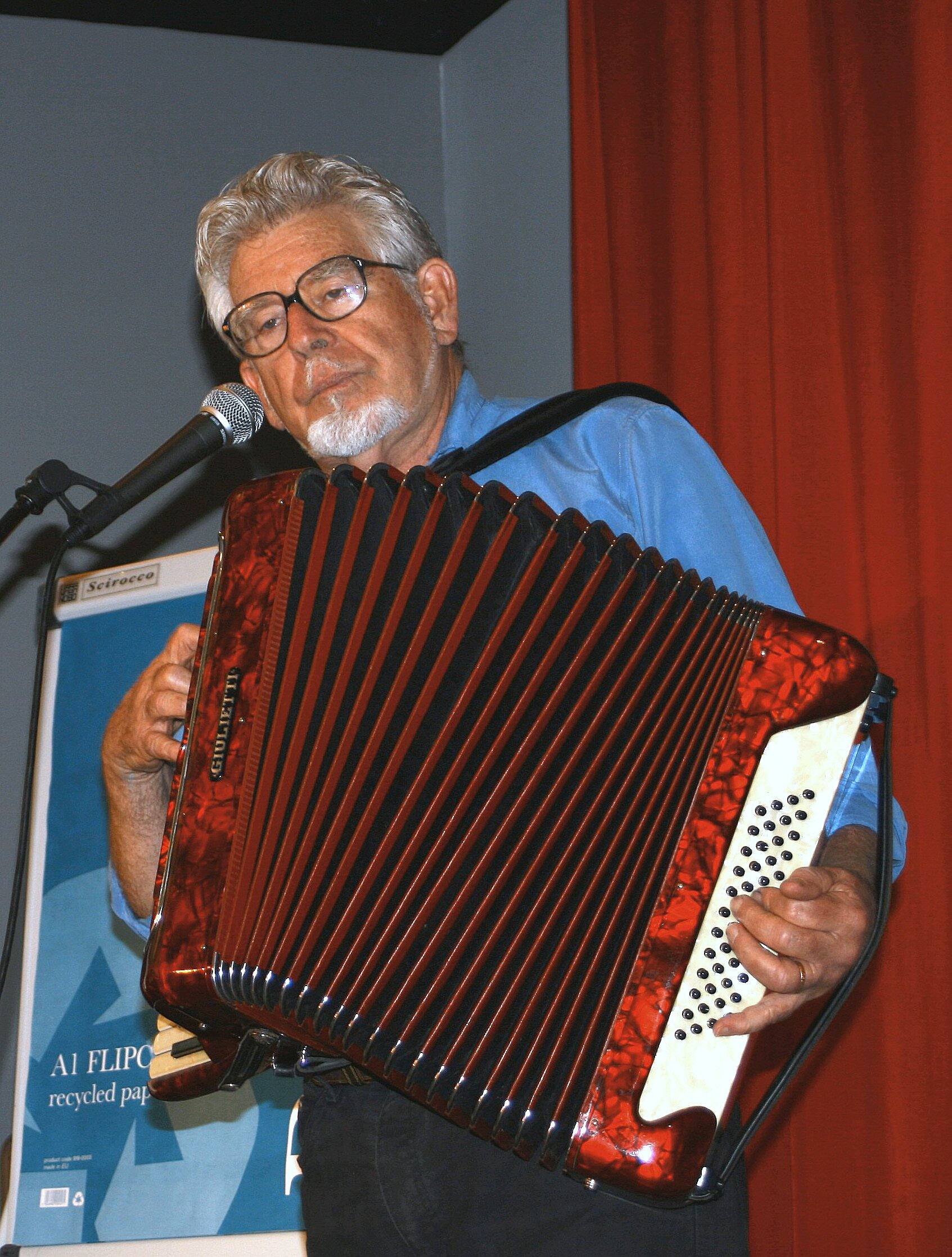
Harris playing the accordion in 2008

Harris released 30 studio albums, two live albums and 48 singles. In 1960, his single "Tie Me Kangaroo Down, Sport" reached number 1 in Australia, and in 1969 "Two Little Boys" reached number 1 on both the Irish and UK charts. His 1992 Rolf Rules OK? album was nominated for the ARIA Music Award for Best Comedy Release.

Harris is credited with inventing a simple homemade instrument called the wobble board. As well as his beatboxing, similar to eefing, Harris went on to use an array of unusual instruments in his music, including the didgeridoo (the sound of which was imitated on "Sun Arise" by four double basses), the Jew's harp and later, the Stylophone (for which he also lent his name and likeness for advertising).

His version of Led Zeppelin's "Stairway to Heaven", featuring didgeridoo and wobble board, reached the UK top ten in 1993. Harris also recorded a version of Queen's "Bohemian Rhapsody" and performed the Divinyls' "I Touch Myself", accompanied only by his wobble board, for "Denton's Musical Challenge" on Triple M Sydney's Andrew Denton Breakfast Show (the recording was released on the first Musical Challenge compilation album in 2000). Harris also recorded an Australian Christmas song called "Six White Boomers", about a joey kangaroo trying to find his mother during the Christmas period. The song describes how Santa Claus used six large male kangaroos ("boomers"), instead of reindeer. In October 2008, Harris announced he would re-record his popular 1969 song "Two Little Boys", backed by North Wales' Froncysyllte Male Voice Choir, to mark the 90th anniversary of the end of World War I. Proceeds from the release were donated to the Poppy Appeal. Harris was inspired to make the recording after participating in My Family at War, a short series of programmes that aired during the BBC's "Remembrance" season, broadcast in November 2008. He discovered that the experiences of his father and uncle during the Great War mirrored the lyrics of the song.

== Sexual offences ==
In March 2013, Harris was one of twelve people arrested in England during Operation Yewtree, for questioning regarding historical allegations of sexual offences. The allegations were not linked to the sexual misconduct revelations surrounding Jimmy Savile, who died in 2011, and Harris denied any wrongdoing. He was bailed without charge, did not comment publicly on the allegations, and was understood to have denied them strongly. When returning to the stage in May 2013 for the first time since his arrest, he thanked the audience for their support.

=== Charges ===
In August 2013, Harris was once again arrested by Operation Yewtree officers and charged with nine counts of indecent assault dating to the 1980s, involving two girls between 14 and 16 years old, and four counts alleging production of indecent child images in 2012. The Crown Prosecution Service's Alison Saunders explained to the media:

Having completed our review, we have concluded there is sufficient evidence and it is in the public interest for Mr Harris to be charged ... The decision has been taken in accordance with the code for crown prosecutors and the Director of Public Prosecutions's interim guidelines on prosecuting cases of child sexual abuse. We have determined that there is sufficient evidence for a realistic prospect of conviction and that a prosecution is in the public interest.

Harris appeared at Westminster Magistrates' Court on 23 September 2013, charged with nine counts of indecent assault and four counts of making indecent images of children. His lawyer indicated that Harris would plead not guilty and he was subsequently bailed. In December 2013, the Crown Prosecution Service confirmed that Harris was facing three further counts of sexual assault. The CPS said that the new charges were of alleged assault against females aged nineteen in 1984, aged seven or eight in 1968 or 1969, and aged fourteen in 1975. At a further hearing at Southwark Crown Court on 14 January 2014, Harris pleaded not guilty to all of the charges.

The four counts of making indecent images were related to the Protection of Children Act 1978, which interprets viewing images on a computer as making images. The charges were brought after detectives examined Harris's computer and found 33 images of possibly underage models among thousands of adult pornographic images. Harris never entered a plea on the charges, as his lawyers argued successfully that the charges should be severed from the 12 sexual assault charges and tried separately. In the aftermath of Harris's conviction, it was reported that his legal team had obtained the identity documents of the models involved, confirming they were adults over 18. The websites Harris had visited, according to the Internet Watch Foundation, are not known for illegal images of children. The prosecution informed the court that they would not be proceeding with the indecent images charges.

=== Trial ===
The trial of Harris began on 6 May 2014 at Southwark Crown Court. Seven of the twelve charges involved allegations of a sexual relationship between Harris and one of his daughter's friends, six of the charges related to when she was between the ages of 13 and 15, and one when she was 19. Harris denied that he had entered into a sexual relationship with the girl until she was 18. During the trial, a letter Harris had written to the girl's father in 1997 after the end of the relationship was shown in court, saying: "I fondly imagined that everything that had taken place had progressed from a feeling of love and friendship—there was no rape, no physical forcing, brutality or beating that took place."

Three charges related to the assault of a 15-year-old Australian girl visiting the UK in 1986. One charge was that he sexually assaulted an eight-year-old girl who asked for his autograph at a community centre in Hampshire in 1968 or 1969. When questioned by police about this allegation, Harris replied, "I would simply never touch a child inappropriately." Harris was also accused of groping the bottom of a 14-year-old girl at a celebrity It's a Knockout event in Cambridge in 1975. He denied that he had visited Cambridge until four years before the trial, but television archive material was produced in court showing that he had taken part in an episode of the ITV show Star Games, which had been filmed in Cambridge in 1978. Harris denied that he had told a deliberate lie and said that his failure to remember the show was "a lapse of memory." Additional witnesses who claimed to have been assaulted in Malta, New Zealand, and Australia were called to testify against Harris, although these charges could not be pursued in the British courts.

=== Conviction and imprisonment ===
After several delays in the trial, in which the judge's summarising took three days, the jury retired to consider its verdict on 19 June 2014. On 30 June, Harris was found guilty of all 12 counts of indecent assault.

At Southwark Crown Court on 4 July 2014, Mr Justice Sweeney sentenced Harris to a total of five years and nine months in prison. When passing sentence, the judge said to Harris: "You have shown no remorse for your crimes at all. Your reputation now lies in ruins, you have been stripped of your honours but you have no one to blame but yourself." Some sentences were expected to run consecutively, and Harris was expected to serve half his sentence in prison. He was told to pay prosecution costs, though not compensation to the victims. The sentence was referred to the Attorney General Dominic Grieve after complaints that it was too lenient. On 30 July 2014, the new Attorney General, Jeremy Wright, announced that he would not be referring the sentence to the Court of Appeal for review "as he did not think they would find it to be unduly lenient and increase it. The sentencing judge was bound by the maximum sentence in force at the time of the offending."

On 1 August 2014, the Judicial Office said that Harris had applied to appeal against his conviction and that his lawyers had lodged papers at the Court of Appeal. In October 2014, Harris was refused permission to appeal, and could apply again before three judges. Harris did not lodge an appeal within the required 28 days, or ask for an extension.

Following his conviction, it was reported in July 2014, October 2014 and February 2015 that he was being investigated by police over other alleged sexual offences.

On 14 June 2015, The Mail on Sunday published a letter, claimed to have been written by Harris in prison and sent to one of his friends. It contained song lyrics that were highly abusive towards his female accusers. Harris was accused by Liz Dux, lawyer for the women who gave evidence, of victim blaming. In response to the lyrics, one of the victims said, "What he did was damage young women's self-worth, their confidence and for some of those women, he affected them deeply for the rest of their lives." The publication of the letter led Dux to question whether Harris should get parole:

It should certainly affect the way he's treated when he applies for early release – he hasn't understood the severity of his crimes. This letter was clearly written by a man who has contempt for his victims and is utterly unrepentant. Far from being reformed by his time in prison, it seems to have fed his perverse sense of indignation and his arrogance is undiminished. If it is the case that a parole board can't take this into account it is totally wrong. Harris has caused those he abused great harm, and by writing this letter, he continues to cause them harm.

In 2014, Vanessa Feltz alleged that Harris sexually assaulted her while she interviewed him live on the bed during an edition of Channel 4 morning programme The Big Breakfast, and Linda Nolan alleged that he groped her in 1975, when she was 15, when the Nolan Sisters were his support act in South Africa.

Harris served his sentence initially at HM Prison Bullingdon, then HM Prison Stafford, which is specifically for men convicted of sex offences. He was released on 19 May 2017, after serving three years of his sentence.

=== Further charges ===
On 12 February 2016, the Crown Prosecution Service announced that Harris would face seven further indecent assault charges. The offences allegedly occurred between 1971 and 2004 and involved seven complainants who were aged between 12 and 27 at the time. Harris pleaded not guilty to all of the charges via videolink at Westminster Magistrates' Court on 17 March and was told to appear at Southwark Crown Court on 14 April. On 14 April, he pleaded not guilty to six charges of indecent assault and one charge of sexual assault.

Harris's trial began on 9 January 2017, with him appearing and watching by videolink from Stafford Prison. Harris did not have to attend in person because of his age and poor health. The prosecution started its case on 11 January; the allegations involved unwanted groping. Unlike at the previous trial, Harris did not give any evidence. His defence said that the jury in the first trial "got it wrong" and that the ensuing media frenzy "made him vulnerable to people making accusations against him". On 8 February, Harris was acquitted of three charges. Judge Alistair McCreath discharged the jury from deliberating on the further four counts of which he was accused.

The prosecution team asked for one week to decide if it would apply for a retrial. On 15 February, it was announced he would face a retrial for three offences, and he faced an additional new charge (to which he pleaded not guilty). His retrial began on 15 May. On 30 May, the jury were unable to reach verdicts, and the prosecution announced that they would not pursue another retrial.

=== Overturning of one conviction ===
On 16 November 2017, Harris's conviction on the charge that he had indecently assaulted an eight-year-old girl at a community centre in Portsmouth in 1969 was overturned on the grounds that it was unsafe. The Court of Appeal dismissed applications to challenge the other eleven convictions from the 2014 trial.

=== Documentary ===
A documentary, Rolf Harris: Hiding in Plain Sight, featuring interviews with Harris's victims, police investigators and colleagues premiered on ITVX on 18 May 2023. The two 60-minute episodes were made by Optomen.

== Personal life, illness and death ==
On 1 March 1958, in Little Venice, London, Harris married Alwen Hughes, a Welsh sculptor and jeweller, while they were both art students. In 1964, he and his wife had a daughter, Bindi.

In September 2016, it was reported that Harris, who had been serving his prison sentence at the time, had been hospitalised with suspected sepsis.

In October 2022, it was reported that Harris was suffering neck cancer, was mostly unable to speak, and was being fed via a tube. He also required 24-hour care. Harris died at his home in Bray, Berkshire, on 10 May 2023, aged 93. His death was not publicly announced until 23 May, when it was confirmed to the press by the Royal Borough of Windsor and Maidenhead register office. His death certificate gave the cause of death as neck cancer and "frailty of old age". Harris was cremated.

On 15 August 2024, his widow Alwen Hughes died aged 92.

== Honours ==
Harris received multiple awards and honours, but following his conviction many of these were rescinded. Harris was appointed a Member of the Order of the British Empire (MBE) in 1968; he was advanced to Officer (OBE) in 1977, then to Commander (CBE) in 2006, but these honours were revoked in March 2015.

In 1986, Harris planted a Cathormion umbellatum tree at Kununurra's celebrity tree park. The plaque recording the planting was stolen in July 2014, a week before the local council voted to keep it. The council, however, felt that ongoing vandalism at the park made it unlikely that the plaque would be replaced.

In 1989, he was appointed a Member of the Order of Australia (AM), and was advanced to Officer (AO) in the Queen's 2012 Birthday Honours. These appointments were rescinded in February 2015.

In 2001, he was awarded the Centenary Medal "for service to entertainment, charity and the community". On 30 July 2014, the board of the National Trust of Australia (New South Wales) voted to remove Harris from the list of those honoured as "Australian National Living Treasures" and to withdraw the award. Harris had been among the original 100 Australians selected for the Medal in 1997.

Harris received two honorary doctorates: from the University of East London in 2007 and Liverpool Hope University in 2010. Both were rescinded following his indecent assault conviction.

In 2008, Harris was inducted into the ARIA Hall of Fame. He was joined onstage by the Seekers to perform "Tie Me Kangaroo Down, Sport" and his "Jake the Peg" routine. After his conviction, the Australian Recording Industry Association removed him from the ARIA Hall of Fame.

The same year, to coincide with the release of Art: The Definitive Visual Guide, publishers Dorling Kindersley conducted the "What the British really think about art today" survey and placed Harris above notable English artist Damien Hirst.

In 2011, Harris was awarded the title of "Best Selling Published Artist" by the Fine Art Trade Guild. He was made a Fellow of BAFTA the following year, but following his conviction, the academy announced that his fellowship would be annulled. In July 2014, Froncysyllte Male Voice Choir announced that Harris's honorary vice-presidency had been annulled.

=== ARIA Music Awards ===
The ARIA Music Awards is an annual awards ceremony held by the Australian Recording Industry Association. They commenced in 1987.

| Year | Nominee / work | Award | Result | Ref. |
|---|---|---|---|---|
| 1994 | Rolf Rules OK | Best Comedy Release | Nominated | |
| 2008 | Rolf Harris | ARIA Hall of Fame | Revoked | |

== Books ==
- Harris, Rolf (2002). Can You Tell what it is Yet?. Corgi. ISBN 978-055-21484-43.

== Filmography ==
| Year | Title | Role | Notes | Ref. |
|---|---|---|---|---|
| 1955 | You Lucky People | Private Proudfoot | Film | |
| 1956 | Jim Whittington and His Sealion | The Demon King | TV film | |
| 1958–59 | The Vise | | TV series | |
| 1959 | Hancock's Half Hour | Unnamed characters | TV series | |
| 1959 | Web of Suspicion | Ben | Film | |
| 1959 | Crash Drive | Bart | Film | |
| 1960 | The Man from Interpol | Grady | TV series | |
| 1963 | To Tell the Truth | Contestant | TV series | |
| 1968 | Christmas Night with the Stars | Contributor | TV series | |
| 1974–75 | The Sooty Show | Himself | TV series: 2 episodes | |
| 1979 | The Little Convict | Grandpa | Film | |
| 1979–1989 | Rolf Harris Cartoon Time | Himself | TV series | |
| 1985 | Highway | Contributor | TV series | |
| 1985 | Kids Can Say No! | Himself | Short film | |
| 1989–1993 | Rolf's Cartoon Club | Himself | TV series | |
| 1994–2004 | Animal Hospital | Himself | TV series | |
| 1998 | Goodnight Sweetheart | Himself | TV series | |
| 2001 | Fetch the Vet | Ralph Morris | TV series | |
| 2004–07 | Star Portraits with Rolf Harris | Himself | TV series | |
| 2011 | Olive the Ostrich | Narrator | TV series | |
| 2011 | The Fruit Cases | Captain Straw | TV series | |
| 2012 | Run for Your Wife | Busker | Film | |
