= Green Thumb Theatre =

Canadian theatre company

- Formation: 1975
- Type: Theatre group
- Purpose: Theatre for Young Audiences
- Location: Vancouver, British Columbia, Canada
- Artistic director: Anita Rochon
- Notable members: Patrick McDonald, Dennis Foon, Ivan Habel, Nadine Carew, Peter Zednyk

Green Thumb Theatre (also known as The Green Thumb Players Society and simply as Green Thumb) is a Canadian children's theatre company based in Vancouver, British Columbia. It was founded in 1975 by playwrights Dennis Foon and Jane Howard Baker. In addition to writing plays produced by the theatre, Foon served as artistic director from 1976 until 1988.

The company is known for developing original Canadian plays that explore contemporary issues faced by young people. Their work has been produced by 200 theatre companies worldwide and translated into "Chinese, French, Spanish, German, Danish, Hebrew and Japanese." The company has also taken their own productions on tours.

== Vision ==
The pair wanted to develop original works for young audiences that would treat difficult contemporary issues. The company has become known worldwide not only for its works but for its own touring productions. Its plays have been translated into numerous languages, including "Chinese, French, Spanish, German, Danish, Hebrew and Japanese." Some 200 theatre companies have produced Green Thumb's plays.

Foon and Baker co-wrote New Canadian Kid (1981), which became the company's signature play. It is about a young immigrant boy who struggles with culture shock and bullying after settling in Canada with his family. It won a British Theatre Award for Best Children's Play in 1985. The play has been produced worldwide for close to 40 years.

Green Thumb operates in a former school house located in East Vancouver. In 1980, Green Thumb produced Feeling Yes, Feeling No, as part of a sexual abuse prevention program.

Green Thumb performed the premiere of Colin Thomas's play One Thousand Cranes (1983). Morris Panych has written several plays for the company that have also toured internationally.

Patrick McDonald is the second artistic director of Green Thumb, serving in that position from 1988 to 2020. The company's production of Celestial Being received the 2015 Jessie Richardson Theatre Award for outstanding production for young audiences. Also that year, Green Thumb performed George F. Walker's Moss Park.

Rachel Aberle was the third artistic director of Green Thumb, serving in the role from January 2021 to December 2023.

== Bibliography ==
- Chambers, Colin (2006). The Continuum Companion to Twentieth Century Theatre. A & C Black. ISBN 1847146120.
- Fairhead, Wayne (2002). Anthony Jackson (ed.). "Establishment or Alternative?: Two Canadian Models". Learning Through Theatre: New Perspectives on Theatre in Education (2 ed.). Routledge: 151–164. ISBN 1134884621.
- New, William H. (2002). Encyclopedia of Literature in Canada. University of Toronto Press. ISBN 0802007619.
- Ross, Mary; Ron Cameron (2013). Behind the Scenes: A Canadian Scene Book. Vol. 1. Dundurn Press. ISBN 1459727495.
- Saxton, Nadine; Katherine Cornell (1998). Toronto Dance Theatre 1968-1998: Stages in a Journey. Captus Press. ISBN 1895712211.
- Selman, Jan; Jane Heather (2015). Theatre, Teens, Sex Ed: Are We There Yet?. University of Alberta Press. ISBN 1772120340.
- Vancouver and Victoria. Ulysses Travel Guides. 2003. ISBN 2894645171.
