= Jake the Peg =

Single by Rolf Harris
- Released: 22 May 1965
- Length: 3:40

"Jake the Peg" is a comedic song about a fictional three-legged man, performed by Rolf Harris and released as a single in 1965.

The song was adapted in 1965 from a version performed by Frank Roosen (a Dutch performer from Vancouver, Canada). The original Dutch party skit was "(Ik ben) van der Steen".

In a 2004 poll by Virgin Radio, Harris' version was voted the fourth-best Australian single of all time.

== Live performances ==
Harris would perform the song with the aid of a theatrical prop leg. June Whitfield reports, in her autobiography And June Whitfield, that she used to watch Harris's performance of the number on stage from the wings, as she waited to follow him, and could not tell during the performance which of his three legs was the false one.

Harris wore a long coat that came down to the knees, and apparently had three identical legs. He would walk around the stage putting his middle foot forward, and then his two side feet, and at times would also stand on his middle leg and stick both outer legs out. While he was moving around the stage he sang the song, which told of his life with three legs.

== Cover versions ==
"Jake the Peg" had been a childhood favourite of comedian Adam Hills, because he was born with only one foot, and Hills performed the song with his prosthetic leg as a child. Hills performed a parody of the song on The Last Leg television show following Harris's conviction for sexual offences.
