= Rolf Harris Cartoon Time =

British children's television series (1979–1989)

- Genre: Animated television series
- Country of origin: United Kingdom
- Original language: English

Production
- Running time: 22 minutes

Original release
- Release: 11 September 1979 – 28 August 1989

Rolf Harris Cartoon Time is a British children's television show presented by Rolf Harris, broadcast on BBC1 between 1979 and 1989.

The show features animations from various contributors. The series ran until August 1989, when it merged with Rolf's Cartoon Club on rival CITV, which premiered four months earlier, whilst the show was nearing its tenth anniversary. That series ran until 1993.
