= Dennis Foon =

Canadian playwright, producer, screenwriter and novelist

- Born: November 18, 1951 (age 75); Detroit, Michigan, U.S.
- Education: University of Michigan
- Occupations: Playwright, producer, screenwriter and novelist
- Years active: 1976–present
- Spouse(s): Jane Howard Baker (1975–1984); Elizabeth Dancoes (1984–present)
- Children: Rebecca Foon, Aliayta-Foon-Dancoes
- Website: dennisfoon.com

Dennis Foon (born 18 November 1951) is a Canadian playwright, producer, screenwriter and novelist.

He was co-founder and artistic director for 12 years of Green Thumb Theatre in Vancouver, British Columbia. There he wrote and produced a body of plays that continue to be produced internationally in numerous languages. He has received the British Theatre Award, two Chalmers awards, the Jesse Richardson Career Achievement Award, a Governor General's nomination for Skin, and the International Arts for Young Audiences Award for these. In 2007, he was made a lifetime member of the Playwrights Guild of Canada for “his outstanding contribution to Canadian Playwriting and Theatre.”

Foon's screenplays have continued his exploration into the psyche of youth: Little Criminals (1995), produced as a CBC movie about an 11-year-old gang leader, won multiple national and international awards; Life, Above All (2011), is a feature that received a ten-minute standing ovation at Cannes; it was shortlisted for a 2011 best foreign language Oscar. He has won a Gemini Award, two Writers Guild of Canada Awards, two Leos, and numerous other international awards for his screenplays.

Foon was born and raised in Detroit, Michigan, and graduated from the University of Michigan. He has worked and resided in Vancouver, Canada since 1973, and has Canadian citizenship.

== Early life and education ==
Foon was born into a Ukrainian-Jewish family in Detroit, Michigan, where he was raised. He attended local schools and the University of Michigan, where he studied fiction. In 1972 he won the Hopwood Award for fiction there. He moved to Vancouver, British Columbia, and has resided in Canada since 1973.

== Theatre ==
During his early years (1975–1978) in theatre, Foon wrote experimental plays, drawing from common children's genres, such as myth, folktales, and indigenous legends. He and Jane Howard Baker were co-founders in 1975 of Green Thumb Theatre, a children's theater based in East Vancouver. He served from 1976 to 1988 as artistic director of the theater, in addition to writing several plays exploring the reality of contemporary children's lives.

In 1978, Foon realized there were few dramatic works that explored contemporary children's lives and reflected their real concerns. He began to write, produce and direct new plays that investigated children's worlds and focused on the concerns of young audiences. As the drama critic Sarah Gibson-Bray states in “The Mirror Game: Reflections of Young Canadians in Dennis Foon’s Child Advocacy Drama”, “Foon’s most significant contribution to the arts in Canada has been as a pioneer playwright who has helped to forge a new, realistic, issue-oriented, dramatic and theatrical genre christened ‘child advocacy theatre.’”

Some of Foon’s most influential works include New Canadian Kid (1981) about a young immigrant (“not only a children’s classic, but a Canadian one as well”, Canadian Theatre Encyclopedia), Skin (1984), Invisible Kids (1985), Liars (1986), and Mirror Game (1988) while with Green Thumb. He later wrote Seesaw (1993), War (1994), Chasing the Money (2000), and Kindness (2008). In these plays, Foon draws from his research, including interviews with hundreds of young subjects, social workers, teachers, and police officers. His works have been enthusiastically received in Canada and around the world. The plays portray with compelling credibility and theatricality the perilous world of children who endure systemic racism, school bullying, the trauma of divorce, and dysfunctional families.

In 1988, Foon left Green Thumb to pursue freelance writing and directing projects. He served as dramaturge and director of Joan MacLeod’s play, Amigo’s Blue Guitar, which won the Governor General’s Award; Rigtig Dansk Dreng at Taastrup Teater, Denmark; and a production of his own Invisible Kids for the Unicorn Theatre, London, England. An internationally produced playwright, he has won the British Theatre Award and been nominated for a Governor General’s award.

== Screenwriting ==
Foon wrote the screenplay Life Above All, winner of the Prix Francois Chalais at Cannes and shortlisted for an Oscar for Best Foreign Language Film.

He wrote the screenplay for Indian Horse (2017), adapted from a 2012 novel of the same name by Richard Wagamese (Ojibwe). His A Shine of Rainbows (starring Aidan Quinn and Connie Nielsen) premiered at TIFF and played at over 30 international film festivals, winning 11 awards.

He co-wrote Mina Shum’s feature Long Life (starring Sandra Oh, which premiered at TIFF and Sundance). Foon has received the Gemini Award, two WGC Awards, four Leos, and the Robert Wagner Award for his screenplays, including Little Criminals, International Emmy Nominee White Lies, Torso (Gemini, Best Movie), The Terry Fox Story, and On The Farm.

He has also written more than 60 hours of episodic television, including Cracked, Cold Squad, and 2030 CE (a series he created for YTV). He was nominated for a Daytime Emmy for Maggie’s Secret. Sawah, winner of the CinemaEuropa Prize, is now on Netflix in 46 countries.

In 2022, Sea to Sky Entertainment and Grinding Halt Films announced that Foon and Jules Arita Koostachin were writing the screenplay for a film adaptation of Wagamese's 2009 novel Ragged Company.

== Books ==
In the 2000s, wanting to delve still deeper into the psyche of youth, he began to write novels, publishing Double or Nothing, Skud (winner of the Sheila A. Egoff Book Award), and the trilogy, The Longlight Legacy. The latter has been published in Dutch, German, French, and Russian, and is described as “... a significant work of speculative fiction ... that should be included in any serious collection of such books.” —Resource Links, 02/07 “a remarkably imaginative future time that still manages to be rooted in our own world ... a powerful story...” Quill & Quire, 12/06

== Awards ==
- Leo Award, Best Screenplay "On the Farm" (2016)
- Leo Award, Best Screenplay "Life Above All" (2011)
- Leo Award, Best Screenplay (with Vic Sarin & Catherine Spears) "A Shine of Rainbows" (2010)
- AATE Distinguished Play Award "Kindness" (2009)
- Lifetime Membership, Playwrights Guild of Canada (2007) for his "outstanding contribution to Canadian Playwriting and Theatre"
- Red Maple Honor Book The Dirt Eaters (2004)
- Sheila A. Egoff Award (BC Book Prize) Skud (2004)
- Writers Guild of Canada: Top Ten Award Torso (2003)
- Robert Wagner Award, best screenplay, White Lies Columbus Int'l TV Festival (1998)
- Career Achievement Award, Vancouver Professional Theatre Alliance (1998)
- Gemini Award, best writing in a Dramatic Program Little Criminals (1997)
- Writers Guild of Canada, Top Ten Award Little Criminals (1997)
- Leo Award (British Columbia Film Award), for best screenplay, Little Criminals (1996)
- Chalmers Award for The Short Tree (1995)
- Scott Newman Award for Maggie's Secret (1990)
- AYA (International Arts for Young Audiences) Award (1989)
- Chalmers Award for Skin (1987)
- British Theatre Award for Invisible Kids (1986)
- Jessie Awards: director of four plays receiving "Best Production for Young Audiences" at the Vancouver Theatre Awards. One Thousand Cranes (1984); Not So Dumb (1985); Skin (1986); Night Light (1987)
- CBC Literary Award for The Short Tree and the Bird That Could Not Sing (1985)
- Writers Digest Award (1973)
- Hopwood Award, Fiction. University of Michigan (1972)

== Plays ==
- Isolation (2020)
- Scar Tissue (2012)
- The Dead Line (2011)
- RICK, The Rick Hansen Story (2010)
- My Acid Trip (2008)
- Chasing the Money (2008)
- Kindness (2007)
- Sunspots (1995)
- War (1994)
- The Short Tree and the Bird That Could Not Sing (1994)
- Seesaw (1993)
- Mirror Game (1988)
- Zaydok Game (1987)
- Bedtimes and Bullies (1987)
- Liars (1986)
- Afternoon Tea (1986)
- Invisible Kids (1985)
- Skin (1984)
- Children's Eyes (1983)
- Hindsight (1983)
- Feeling Yes, Feeling No (1982)
- Trummi Kaput (1982)
- New Canadian Kid (1981)
- The Hunchback of Notre Dame (1981)
- The Windigo (1979)
- Raft Baby (1978)
- Heracles (1978)

== Books ==
- The Longlight Legacy
  - The Keeper's Shadow (2006)
  - Freewalker (2004)
  - The Dirt Eaters (2003)
- Skud (2003)
- Double or Nothing (2000)
- Am I the Only One? A Child's Book on Sexual Abuse (1987)
- The Short Tree and the Bird that Could Not Sing (1986)

== Films ==
- Sawah (2019)
- Indian Horse (2017)
- On the Farm (2016)
- Life, Above All (2010)
- A Shine of Rainbows (2009)
- Terry (2005)
- Scar Tissue (2002)
- Society's Child (2002)
- Torso (2002)
- Long Life, Happiness & Prosperity (2002)
- White Lies (1998)
- Little Criminals (1995)
