= Star Portraits with Rolf Harris =

- Presented by: Rolf Harris
- Country of origin: United Kingdom
- Original language: English
- No. of series: 3
- No. of episodes: 11

Production
- Running time: 30 minutes

Original release
- Network: BBC
- Release: 2004 – 2007

Star Portraits with Rolf Harris is a BBC television series that ran for three seasons from 2004 to 2007. The show features three artists who each paint a picture of a celebrity, and then the celebrity gets to choose which paintings to keep.It was invented by Simon Broadley and was presented by Australian entertainer Rolf Harris.

== Episodes ==
=== Series One (2004) ===
The episodes of Series One were watched by 5 million viewers, the most that any art programme has had in the United Kingdom. The celebrities painted were:

- Michael Parkinson, CBE, TV presenter
- Charlie Dimmock, Gardening Expert and TV Presenter
- David Dickinson, Antique Expert and TV Presenter
- Meera Syal, Actress, Writer, Journalist

=== Series Two (2005) ===
- Cilla Black, Singer and Television Presenter
- Adrian Edmondson, Comedian and Writer
- Dr Mo Mowlam, Member of Parliament
- Richard Wilson, Actor

=== Series Three (2007) ===
- Dame Barbara Windsor, Actress
- Dame Kelly Holmes, Athlete
- Bill Oddie OBE, Comedian, Presenter and Conservationist

== The exhibitions ==
After each series was over, the paintings went on a tour of Britain.
