= The Longlight Legacy =

The Longlight Legacy is a trilogy of fantasy/science fiction books by Dennis Foon. The first book, The Dirt Eaters, was published in 2003. It was followed by Freewalker in 2004 and The Keeper's Shadow in 2006. The story takes place in a post-apocalyptic future, after a massive war that devastated the natural environment of (presumably) the Americas. The survivors, concentrated in tiny villages divided into clans, are ruled by the City, which control all commerce and trade. The main characters include Roan, Lumpy, Stowe, and the clan known as the Brothers in the first book.
