= Sandy K. Wurtele =

American psychologist

- Born: Nebraska City, Nebraska

Academic background
- Education: BA, Psychology, 1977, University of Nebraska–Lincoln; MA, Clinical Psychology, 1980, PhD, 1983, University of Alabama
- Thesis: The Relative Contributions of Protection Motivation Theory Components in Predicting Exercise Intentions and Behavior (1983)

Academic work
- Institutions: University of Colorado Colorado Springs; Washington State University
- Website: sandywurtele.com

Sandy Kay Wurtele is an American psychologist. She is professor emerita in the Department of Psychology at the University of Colorado Colorado Springs where she specialized in the prevention of childhood sexual abuse. Wurtele is the author of several educational and scholarly materials for professionals, parents, and children on preventing childhood sexual assault and abuse. Wurtele has provided training and consultation to a number of national and international organizations and researchers on this topic, including on the National Center for Missing & Exploited Children's Education Standards Task Force, the USA Swimming Safe Sport Committee, USA Wrestling, and the Roman Catholic Diocese of Wilmington.

== Early life and education ==
Wurtele was born in Nebraska City, Nebraska. She enrolled at the University of Nebraska–Lincoln for her undergraduate degree and was inducted into Phi Beta Kappa. Wurtele graduated with High Distinction in 1977 and then completed her Master's degree and PhD at the University of Alabama. Following an APA-approved clinical internship at the University of Mississippi Medical Center, she accepted a faculty position at Washington State University.

== Career ==
In 1987, Wurtele was awarded a FIRST Independent Research Award from the National Institute of Mental Health (NIMH) to develop and evaluate child sexual abuse (CSA) prevention programs for young children. Wurtele began comparing different ways to teach children body safety skills in classrooms in Pullman, Washington and Lewiston, Idaho. In 1988, Wurtele accepted a faculty position at the University of Colorado Colorado Springs and transferred her research program to Colorado Springs where she offered CSA prevention programs to parents and children at local preschools and in Head Start classrooms.

The common goals of child-focused CSA prevention programs include the 5Rs of: (a) helping children recognize potentially abusive situations or potential abusers, (b) encouraging children to refuse sexual requests by saying “No,” (c) teaching children to resist by getting away from the potential perpetrator, (d) encouraging children to report previous or ongoing abuse to a trusted authority figure and (e) explaining that secret or inappropriate touching is never the child's responsibility. To teach the 5Rs, Wurtele's research has shown that programs which incorporate modeling (i.e., demonstrating the skill to be learned) and rehearsal (e.g., role plays) are more effective than programs that primarily rely on individual study or passive exposure. Programs for young children are more effective if they are longer in duration (four sessions or more), if they repeat important concepts across spaced sessions rather than massed presentation, and if they are based on concrete rules rather than abstract concepts (e.g., rights, feelings, good touch-bad touch). Wurtele's studies have shown that using the "good touch and bad touch" approach for teaching children how to recognize inappropriate touch requests is confusing, especially for young children Wurtele's research also determined that programs increase participants' willingness to disclose, enhance positive feelings and correct terminology about their bodies and genitals, and help children learn that it is not their fault if abuse occurs. She has also developed guidance for teachers and parents to address children's sexual behaviors in the classroom and at home. Wurtele was also the lead author on a research study showing that preschoolers in Head Start learned the correct names of their genitals better from their parents than from their teachers.

In 2009, Wurtele received the William Friedrich Memorial Child Sexual Abuse Research, Assessment and/or Treatment Award from the Institute on Violence Abuse and Trauma for "her work to prevent child abuse and for development of effective abuse prevention programs." The following year, she published two books, Off Limits: A parent’s guide to keeping kids safe from sexual abuse through Safer Society Press and Out of Harm’s Way: A Parent’s Guide to Protecting Young Children from Sexual Abuse through Parenting Press Inc. A third book, Safe Connections: A parent’s guide to safeguarding young teens from sexual harm was published in 2012 by Parenting Press.

Wurtele has also served on numerous task forces concerning preventing childhood sexual and emotional abuse. In 2012, she was appointed a child protection consultant by the vicar general for the Roman Catholic Diocese of Wilmington. While serving in this role, she evaluated and made recommendations regarding diocese policies on the protection of children and youth from sexual exploitation. Following this, Wurtele established the Service-Learning Internship and Community Engagement Center (SLICE) program to allow students the opportunity to earn college credits through internships. In the same year, she participated in USA Swimming's first Safe Sport Leadership Conference. In 2014, Wurtele was selected to sit on the nine-person Safe Sport Program Review Task Force for USA Swimming. The aim of the task force was to suggest ways to prevent the sexual and emotional abuse of athletes. Based on their recommendations, USA Swimming approved a series of task-force recommendations including improved training, transparency in the reporting and investigation of incidents, and counseling and emotional support services for victims. During the summer before the 2017 academic year, Wurtele sat on the faculty-led redesign team that was preparing to move all Faculty Course Questionnaires online beginning fall 2017.

In addition to child-focused prevention efforts, Wurtele proposed that forming a ‘prevention partnership’ with parents has several advantages. She suggested that educating parents about these risk factors in the home environment (e.g., lack of supervision or privacy, presence of unrelated males, restricted parent-child communication about sexuality, lack of screening of substitute caregivers, children taught blind obedience to authority figures, etc.) could enable them to improve the safety of the home environment by increasing monitoring and supervision, enhancing their communication with their children about sexuality, and screening substitute caregivers. Given the potential for adolescents to be abused through online sexual solicitation, Wurtele has also provided parents with guidance about safe Internet use and how to talk to their children about cyber safety. As well as child- and parent-focused prevention efforts, Wurtele has also addressed sexual abuse occurring in youth-serving organizations (YSOs) including schools, youth groups, foster care, correctional facilities, faith-based institutions, and recreational or sporting clubs. Wurtele has recommended broad approaches to protecting children from abuse in YSOs, including screening, establishing protection policies and procedures, training, along with monitoring and supervision. Wurtele has also conducted research with incarcerated sexual abusers explored the prevalence and correlates of sexual interest in children among an online sample of men and women, and determined the impact of education and direct contact with abusers on college students’ perceptions of child sexual offenders.

== See also ==
- Maureen Kenny, professor of psychology at Florida International University and colleague of Wurtele.
