= 2007 in British television =

This is a summary of the year 2007 in British television.

== Events ==
=== January ===
Date	Event
2 January	This Life returns for a ten-year reunion special.
2 January	Des O'Connor takes over from Des Lynam as co-presenter (with Carol Vorderman) of Channel 4's long-running quiz show Countdown.
3 January	Celebrity Big Brother 5 is launched on Channel 4, with celebrities such as Jermaine Jackson, Dirk Benedict and Leo Sayer.
3 January	The Bill airs a new set of opening titles, paying homage to the original 1984 opening titles. The titles also include shots of London, interspersed with police work and shots of Sun Hill Police Station. The break bumpers and music are also updated.
5 January	Leslie Ash officially opens the Centre for Healthcare Associated Infections (CHIA), a national facility at the University of Nottingham dedicated to conducting research into superbug infections. Ash is also the Centre's patron.
5 January	Former Big Brother contestant Jade Goody returns to the Big Brother House to take part in the fifth series of Celebrity Big Brother. On the same evening musician Donny Tourette walks off the show after just 48 hours.
7 January	Laura Pearce, a 24-year-old civilian employee of Gloucestershire Constabulary, becomes the first contestant to win the £250,000 on the British version of Deal or No Deal.
7 January	Hannah Waterman and Marti Pellow win the second series of BBC One's Just the Two of Us.
7 January	Film director Ken Russell becomes the second contestant to leave Celebrity Big Brother in two days, following a row with Jade Goody.
8 January	Michael Grade takes over as chief executive of ITV plc.
8 January	The Calendar East and Calendar South regions are merged to form a new Calendar South region covering central and east Lincolnshire, east and south east Yorkshire, east Nottinghamshire and north Norfolk. The Calendar North region, broadcasting from the Emley Moor transmitter continues as before.
8 January	STV launches separate news services for the East and West of the STV Central region, initially as a five-minute opt out within the 6:00 pm edition of Scotland Today on weeknights.
9 January	Sky News hires Meridian Tonight presenter Charlotte Hawkins to co-present Sunrise alongside Eamonn Holmes; she makes her debut on 15 January.
12 January	Singer Leo Sayer becomes the third person to leave Celebrity Big Brother 5 after walking out of the show.
13 January	Coronation Street actor Antony Cotton wins the second series of ITV's Soapstar Superstar.
13 January	ITV1 airs the British terrestrial television premiere of Harry Potter and the Prisoner of Azkaban. The film achieves the highest audience of the day, with overnight figures indicating an audience of eight million.
17 January	Protests are held in India and the UK against Celebrity Big Brother after Jade Goody, Danielle Lloyd and Jo O'Meara are alleged to be racially abusive to Bollywood star, Shilpa Shetty. The programme has also attracted several thousand complaints from viewers to Ofcom, Channel 4 and the police, and is criticised by senior politicians both in the UK and India.
19 January	Jade Goody is evicted from Celebrity Big Brother following the racism row. Goody and Shilpa Shetty had both faced eviction, with Goody receiving 82% of the public vote. During a post-eviction interview, from which the wider public is banned, Goody says that she is "embarrassed and disgusted" by her behaviour. She had also apologised to Shetty before leaving the Big Brother house.
22 January	BBC News 24 is re-branded with new titles and on-screen graphics.
26 January	Jo O'Meara is evicted from Celebrity Big Brother. Viewing clips of her behaviour in the Big Brother house during a post-eviction interview, she says that it looks "very bad", but says she is not a racist.
28 January	The final edition of Grandstand, the flagship BBC sports programme, is aired after nearly 50 years on television screens.
28 January	Shilpa Shetty wins the fifth series of Celebrity Big Brother. During the live final, Danielle Lloyd apologises for her behaviour toward the actress during the series.

=== February ===
Date	Event
2 February	Plans by Channel 4 to air a series of documentaries about masturbation in March are postponed after the event has attracted controversy and criticism from senior television figures. The programmes are to be shown separately at a later date and not as part of a season.
2 February	Five airs the final episode of In the Grid.
9 February	Paul Merton presents his last edition of Room 101.
14 February	BBC One airs the biopic Veronica Guerin, starring Cate Blanchett in the title role of Irish journalist Veronica Guerin.
14 February	Samuel Preston walks off live on an episode of Never Mind the Buzzcocks after insults about his wife Chantelle Houghton. Team captain Bill Bailey replaces him with a member of the audience, Ed Seymour.
15 February	Michael Starke, who played Sinbad in Brookside, is to join the cast of Coronation Street as take-away owner Jerry Morton. He will be seen onscreen from 18 March.
18 February	BBC Two launches 14 new idents designed by Abbott Mead Vickers BBDO and produced by Red Bee Media, with the "2" becoming a "Windows of the World" a portal through which the world is seen differently.
18 February	Richard & Judy is scrutinised when it is claimed that the winners were already chosen for its premium-rate phone-in quiz, "You Say, We Pay". This results in the start of the phone-in scandal.
20 February	The newly launched Virgin Media launches its new on-demand channel Virgin Central.
February	UTV in Northern Ireland splits UTV Live and UTV Life into separate programmes and all bulletins outside of the main early evening programme are retitled UTV News. This continues until April 2009.

=== March ===
Date	Event
1 March	A channel agreement between Virgin Media and BSkyB for Virgin to broadcast non-premium Sky channels ends at midnight. Virgin Media and Sky have failed to reach agreement on the issue and subsequently Sky One, Sky Two, Sky Travel, Sky Travel Extra, Sky Sports News and Sky News are removed from the Virgin line-up. The Sky Movies and Sky Sports channels (aside from Sky Sports News) are unaffected and continue to broadcast on Virgin as normal.
2 March	The Attorney General for England and Wales, Lord Goldsmith, obtains an injunction from the High Court preventing the BBC from broadcasting an item about investigations into the alleged cash for honours political scandal.
5 March	ITV's quiz channel ITV Play is implicated in the phone-in scandal. As a result, ITV allow independent auditor Deloitte to review programmes with phone-ins that generate revenue such as Dancing on Ice and The X Factor.
5 March	Shaun the Sheep first airs.
7 March	The BBC's correspondent in the Gaza Strip, Alan Johnston, who is the only foreign reporter from a major media organisation based in Gaza, is kidnapped. All the main Palestinian militant groups call for his release.
7 March	Louise Redknapp presents the controversial ITV documentary The Truth About Size Zero in which she attempts to drop to a size zero in 30 days by following a strict weight loss regimen in order to highlight eating disorder issues.
7 March	Five's game show BrainTeaser is suddenly axed by the channel after five years. It is later revealed the sudden axing was in relation to the phone-in scandal, as the show's production company Endemol had faked on-air winners by posing production team members as such. Five is fined a record £300,000 by Ofcom over the incidents.
9 March	The BBC's Castaway returns for a second, but shorter, series.
13 March	ITV Play is shut down permanently due to the phone-in scandal.
14 March	BBC children's programme Blue Peter is now involved with the phone-in scandal, after it is discovered they used a girl who was visiting the studio to pose as a caller live on the show.
15 March	Steven Wallis wins the 2007 series of MasterChef Goes Large.
16 March	During Comic Relief night, the last ever episode of The Vicar of Dibley is broadcast. BBC One's Red Nose Day 2007 also includes a special episode of Mr. Bean, a celebrity edition of The Apprentice, and a Catherine Tate sketch in which Lauren Cooper meets Tony Blair while on work experience at 10 Downing Street.
17 March	Rugby player Kyran Bracken and skating partner Melanie Lambert win the second series of Dancing on Ice.
17 March	Pop group Scooch are selected to represent the United Kingdom at the Eurovision Song Contest with the song "Flying the Flag (For You)". The Eurovision: Making Your Mind Up show however ends in disarray when a mix-up results in presenters Fearne Cotton and Terry Wogan both simultaneously declaring Scooch and runner-up Cyndi as the winner respectively. Following several seconds of confusion, Scooch were confirmed as the winners of the public vote.
18 March	After 10 years, Formula One on ITV goes 16:9 widescreen, with the opening race, the Australian Grand Prix, watched by 6 million viewers.
19 March	In the Night Garden... premieres on BBC Two in the same month as the Teletubbies 10th anniversary.
20 March	Dancing on Ice reveals they lost 11,500 phone calls, as they were not delivered to Vodafone until next Monday morning (26 March), but confirm that the affected votes would not have altered the final result.
22 March	Four years after the 2003 invasion of Iraq, a special edition of BBC One's Question Time debates the war's legacy.
26 March	Singer Katherine Jenkins will make a cameo appearance in Emmerdale, the soap's producers confirm. Her appearance will be in May, and coincide with the resolution of the Tom King murder storyline.
27 March	Moira Stuart is replaced as presenter of the news bulletin during Sunday AM, leaving her without a regular news slot. The decision to remove her from the programme prompts media allegations of ageism at the BBC, something which is rejected by Director-General Mark Thompson, who in April tells the House of Commons Culture, Media and Sport Committee that Stuart was replaced because of the changing role of television news presenting, which is moving towards television journalism rather than traditional news presenting. Stuart continues to present for the broadcaster, but on 3 October, it is confirmed that she will leave BBC News.
27 March	The teleshopping channel iBuy closes after just under two years on air.
30 March	ITV announces that Dermot O'Leary will replace Kate Thornton as host of The X Factor after Thornton was sacked from the programme after presenting three (and one celebrity) series.
30 March	Five celebrates ten years of its launch.
31 March	Freema Agyeman makes her debut as Doctor Who assistant Martha Jones as the science fiction drama returns for a third series. Any Dream Will Do, a search for someone to play Joseph in the Lloyd Webber musical Joseph and the Amazing Technicolour Dreamcoat also debuts on BBC One.
31 March	The Teletubbies celebrate their 10th anniversary.

=== April ===
Date	Event
1 April	The Sky at Night celebrates 50 years with a special anniversary edition.
4 April	Sky Movies rebrands with each channel having its own genre.
5 April	ITV News announces the award of a new six-year contract from ITV, worth £250 million.
7 April	Debut of ITV's Grease is the Word which will search for two actors to play Danny and Sandy in a new stage production of Grease.
10 April	BBC One airs the concluding episode of the second and final series of Life on Mars.
13 April	Have I Got News for You starts to produce a video podcast featuring unbroadcast material.
16 April	The University of Warwick wins the 2006–07 series of University Challenge, beating the University of Manchester 170–140.
21 April	BBC sports journalist Jacqui Oatley becomes the first female commentator to appear on Match of the Day.
23 April	A BBC Panorama discloses that callers to GMTV's phone-in competitions may have been defrauded out of millions of pounds, because the telephone system operator, Opera Interactive Technology, had determined the winners before the phone lines had closed. GMTV responded by suspending the phone-in quizzes, but claims that "it was confident it had not breached regulators' codes". Opera Interactive also denies any wrongdoing.
24 April	It is announced that the BBC celebrity singing contest Just the Two of Us will not return for a third series.
30 April	Channel 4 airs the Cutting Edge documentary Blind Young Things, a programme about students at the Royal National College for the Blind in Hereford. The film won a Royal Television Society award for Channel 4 and the Cutting Edge team in 2008.

=== May ===
Date	Event
12 May	Serbia's Marija Šerifović wins the 2007 Eurovision Song Contest with "Molitva".
14 May	BBC One broadcasts "Scientology and Me" a Panorama investigation into Scientology by journalist John Sweeney. A clip from the programme of Sweeney losing his temper and shouting at a disruptive scientologist representative is widely released on the internet and by DVD by scientologists prior to airing.
16 May	Launch of Freesat, a free-to-air digital satellite television joint venture between the BBC and ITV plc.
17 May	In Emmerdale, the Tom King whodunit storyline reaches its conclusion as the identity of the killer is revealed. The killer is Tom's son, Carl King (Tom Lister). The episode also features a cameo appearance by singer Katherine Jenkins, who plays herself attending a village pageant as its guest of honour.
24 May	Ofcom rules that Celebrity Big Brother breached its code of conduct during the last series, and that Channel 4 made "serious editorial misjudgements" in the way it dealt with some of the incidents that sparked the racism row.
29 May	ITV axes its celebrity singing contest, Soapstar Superstar after two series, believing it to be too similar in format to The X Factor.
31 May	The BBC Trust approves plans for several BBC departments, including BBC Sport, to be moved to a new development in Salford.

=== June ===
Date	Event
4 June	It is announced that Dannii Minogue will replace Louis Walsh as a judge on the forthcoming series of The X Factor, joining Simon Cowell and Sharon Osbourne. Walsh had intended to leave the show, but later decides to return after being invited back.
7 June	Following the Celebrity Big Brother racism controversy earlier in the year, a contestant on the eighth series of Big Brother is removed from the show after her use of the word "nigger" during a conversation with another contestant.
8 June	Adele Adkins, a 19-year-old singer from London makes her television debut on BBC Two's Later... with Jools Holland, performing her song "Daydreamer", becoming one of the first artists to appear on the show without having released a record because producer Alison Howe booked her after hearing a demo tape. Adele's debut album, 19, is released in January 2008.
9 June	Lee Mead wins BBC One's Any Dream Will Do and will take the lead role of Joseph in the Andrew Lloyd Webber musical Joseph and the Amazing Technicolour Dreamcoat at the Adelphi Theatre from 17 July. ITV's Grease is the Word is won by Danny Bayne and Susan McFadden, who will play Danny and Sandy in a forthcoming production of Grease beginning at the Piccadilly Theatre on 8 August.
9 June	Debut of Britain's Got Talent, a co-production between Talkback Thames and Simon Cowell's SyCo for ITV. The series is a search for a variety act to perform at this year's Royal Variety Performance. The winner will also receive a prize of £100,000.
11 June	The Mirror reports that Emmerdale actress Adele Silva is to quit her role as Kelly Windsor.
13 June	Simon Ambrose wins the third series of The Apprentice.
15 June	A contestant on Britain's Got Talent is withdrawn from the contest after police contact the series to alert producers that he is on the Sex Offenders Register.
15 June	Nadia Sawalha wins the 2007 series of Celebrity MasterChef.
17 June	Opera singer Paul Potts wins the first series of Britain's Got Talent.
19 June	Nick Ross announces he is leaving Crimewatch, with July's edition of the show being the final one he will present. The announcement renews media speculation that the BBC has an ageist policy towards its presenters.
25 June–8 July	Live coverage of Wimbledon 2007 is aired by the BBC with the last Wimbledon season to be shot in 4:3 fullscreen and the second season to be shot in 16:9 widescreen.

=== July ===
Date	Event
1 July	BBC One airs the Concert for Diana on what would have been the 46th birthday of the late Diana, Princess of Wales.
2 July	Nick Ross presents his final episode of Crimewatch after 23 years at the helm. He had been on the programme since it began in 1984.
2 July	Launch of Press TV, an English-language global news channel owned by the Iranian state broadcaster IRIB.
11 July	BBC Two debuts The Alastair Campbell Diaries, a series in which Campbell reads extracts from his memoirs over footage of key moments in the recently ended Blair government. The three part series is aired over three nights, concluding on 13 July.
15 July	The 28th series of Last of the Summer Wine begins on BBC One.
18 July	Six BBC programmes, Children in Need, Comic Relief, Sport Relief, TMi and two radio programmes (The Liz Kershaw Show and White Label) have been discovered to have been involved in the phone in scandals.
23 July	All music channels have permanently suspended their viewer selection aspects due to the ongoing premium rate phone-in scandals.
25 July	The acclaimed US science fiction series Heroes makes its debut on BBC Two.
26 July	The 2005 British Comedy Awards broadcast on ITV now become involved with the phone-in scandal, when it is discovered that people phoning in to vote for the People's Choice Award called when the programme was not being broadcast live, and the last half-hour of the show had been recorded when ITV showed a news broadcast.

=== August ===
Date	Event
2 August	2007 sees the BBC celebrating their 75-year service in television (85 years for radio). The first BBC Television Service began on 2 August 1932.
6 August	ITV airs the final episode of the light-hearted horticultural crime drama Rosemary & Thyme titled Enter Two Gardeners.
8 August	Former Peak Practice actor Gray O'Brien joins the cast of Coronation Street as catalogue salesman Tony Gordon.
9 August	The success of Australian soaps such as Neighbours on British television has led to the wide use of phrases such as "no worries" in British English since the late 1980s, a report on Australia's Nine News suggests.
11 August	ITV1 airs the British terrestrial television premiere of the 2004 sci-fi action adventure film Thunderbirds. At the same time, the Motorola Razr V3X ITV Movies sponsorship idents return for one night only.
18 August	Who Wants to Be a Millionaire? returns to ITV1 for a new series and a revised format in which the number of questions to answer to win the £1 million prize is reduced from 15 to 12.
26 August	The last episode of the BBC children's television series Smile is broadcast presented by Barney Harwood and Kirsten O'Brien, from 7:30 until 10:00 on BBC Two.
31 August	Brian Belo wins series eight of Big Brother.

=== September ===
Date	Event
3 September	CBBC identity relaunched, with its third marketing campaign since the launch of the CBBC channel. Escape from Scorpion Island premieres.
3 September	Lauren McAvoy wins Cycle 3 of Britain's Next Top Model.
4 September	BBC One airs the 2004 romantic comedy Raising Helen, starring Kate Hudson.
5 September	The BBC scraps plans for Planet Relief, a programme like Comic Relief and Sport Relief for fear of bias against critics of climate change and that people would prefer more factual programmes on the subject.
7 September–20 October	ITV provides coverage of the 2007 Rugby World Cup, hosted by France.
9 September	In an advertising first, eBay begin showing live auction adverts between programmes, showing an auction with picture, current bid, time auction ends, and postage and packaging charges
9 September	The BBC One Sunday morning political programme Sunday AM is renamed The Andrew Marr Show when it returns after its summer break.
10 September	ITV and Trevor McDonald are cleared of racism by Ofcom over remarks made on McDonald's News Knight show. The remarks concerned comedian Bernard Manning, who had died a few months previously, with McDonald referring to Manning as a 'fat, white bastard'.
13 September	The BBC signs a two-year deal to provide coverage of the Super Bowl, the first time the event will be aired by the BBC. Super Bowl XLII will air in 2008, and Super Bowl XLIII in 2009.
17 September	Children's show Mister Maker is first aired on CBeebies.
18 September	It is announced that E.ON is to end its sponsorship of ITV Weather after 16 years. The sponsorship deal was the longest on UK terrestrial TV to date, beginning on 22 September 1991 (when sponsorship of ITV programmes was first allowed). Until June 2007, ITV Weather was sponsored by the energy supplier Powergen, and since then by Powergen's parent company E.ON.
18 September	Dame Kelly Holmes presents the weekly round-up of sports news on BBC London News as an apparent substitute for regular presenter Mark Bright; she is introduced by anchorwoman Riz Lateef without explanation.
21 September	ITV postpone broadcasting the 2007 British Comedy Awards due to the phone-in scandals.
26 September	ABC1 ceases broadcasting.
26 September	The Bionic Woman returns after a break of nearly 30 years but is axed again 2 months later.
28 September	Trapped! appears as CBBC's first ever Halloween-themed game show since CITV's last ones to date that ever were Terror Towers and Scary Sleepover.
29 September	Date on which the BBC finally airs an unedited version of the 1990 Star Trek: The Next Generation episode "The High Ground", which caused controversy at the time when one of the characters made reference to an Irish reunification occurring in 2024.

=== October ===
Date	Event
1 October	Virgin1 launches at 9 pm, replacing Ftn.
1 October	The BBC announces that former 5 News presenter Kirsty Young will replace Fiona Bruce as presenter on Crimewatch from January 2008. Bruce is to take over as presenter of The Antiques Roadshow from Michael Aspel, who plans to retire.
4 October	It is announced that ITV News and the ITV regional newsrooms are to switch from the traditional 4:3 format to 16:9 widescreen on 2 December.
5 October	BBC newsreader Natasha Kaplinsky is to leave the broadcaster to present Five News, it is reported. She will take up the new presenting role in the New Year.
8 October	Five has bought the rights to 8 Simple Rules starting on 21 October.
9 October	Sky One apologises to viewers after a "technical fault" during a public vote on the 7 October edition of its show, Cirque de Celebrite, meant some of the votes were not registered.
14 October	UKTV Bright Ideas ceases broadcasting to be replaced on Freeview by Dave.
15 October	UKTV G2 is rebranded as Dave and becomes a free-to-air channel replacing newly defunct UKTV Bright Ideas. The name for the channel, aimed at a young male audience, was chosen by UKTV because "everyone knows a bloke called Dave".
17 October – 14 November	The town of Whitehaven in Cumbria becomes the first place in the UK to lose their analogue television signals and start the digital switchover, starting with BBC Two. The other four channels were switched off on 14 November.
20 October	The BBC Switch teenage block of shows is launched to cater for the underserved 12- to 16-year-olds.
29 October	Sky News issues an apology after an aside from presenter Julie Etchingham was accidentally broadcast during live coverage of a speech by Conservative Party leader David Cameron when Etchingham's microphone was accidentally left switched on.
29 October	The BBC announces that Patsy Palmer will return to EastEnders to reprise her role as Bianca Jackson. The following day it is also confirmed that Sid Owen, who played her on-screen husband, Ricky Butcher, will also return to the series.
30 October	Roger Cook's Greatest Hits (a 20th Anniversary retrospective of The Cook Report airs on ITV.
31 October	ITV confirms that Julie Etchingham will join the broadcaster to present a relaunched News at Ten alongside Sir Trevor McDonald from January 2008.

=== November ===
Date	Event
2 November	Emily Nakanda withdraws from The X Factor due to a "happy slapping" video she had been involved in at her university.
21 November	Insurance firm esure is revealed as E.ON's successor as the sponsor of ITV's national weather bulletins. The two-year deal, rumoured to be worth £10 million, was negotiated by Carat Sponsorship and will take effect from 1 January 2008, with esure and Sheilas' Wheels as the sponsors, alternating between the two brands every two months.
27 November	The BBC announces that Billie Piper will reprise her role as Rose Tyler in the fourth series of Doctor Who after leaving at the end of the second series.
29 November	Kelly Brook is forced to withdraw from Strictly Come Dancing following the death of her father, Kenneth.
30 November	Christopher Biggins wins the seventh series of I'm a Celebrity...Get Me Out of Here!.

=== December ===
Date	Event
1 December	ITV News and the ITV regional newsrooms cease being broadcast in 4:3 aspect. Freeview Channel in the UK also sees ITV News and the ITV regional newsrooms cease being cropped to 14:9 format.
2 December	ITV News and the ITV regional newsrooms began using 16:9 widescreen.
3 December	Jay Hunt is confirmed as the next Controller of BBC One, replacing Peter Fincham. She will take up the role in early 2008.
9 December	Boxer Joe Calzaghe is named as this year's BBC Sports Personality of the Year.
15 December	Leon Jackson wins the fourth series of The X Factor.
22 December	Singer Alesha Dixon and her dancing partner Matthew Cutler win the fifth series of Strictly Come Dancing.
25 December	BBC One gets its highest rated Christmas Day schedule in years, with "Voyage of the Damned", the Christmas special of Doctor Who, getting the shows' biggest audience since 1979 (13.31 million) and a special episode of EastEnders getting 14.38 million, that shows' biggest rating in three years and the highest rated show of 2007. Another success is a one-off special of To the Manor Born, returning after 26 years, with an audience of 10.25 million.
25 December	BBC iPlayer, an online service for watching previously aired shows, is launched.
27–28 December	"Assault on Sun Hill", a two-part The Bill story, features an armed siege at the fictional police station that leaves several characters traumatised.
30 December	Babe is aired on BBC One for the last time.

== Debuts ==
=== BBC One ===
Date	Debut
1 January	The Sarah Jane Adventures
8 January	M.I. High
8 January	The Likeaballs
12 January	Lilies
12 January	After You've Gone
25 January	Five Days
25 February	Recovery
5 March	Shaun the Sheep
16 March	Celebrity Apprentice
23 March	A Class Apart
25 March	Play It Again
31 March	Any Dream Will Do
8 April	Inspector George Gently
13 April	Ruddy Hell! It's Harry and Paul
24 April	Life Line
8 May	HolbyBlue
25 May	Ronni Ancona & Co
16 June	Jekyll
16 June	Would I Lie to You?
23 July	Finley the Fire Engine
4 August	Empathy
6 August	How to Live Longer
28 August	Outnumbered
2 September	Coming Down the Mountain
3 September	Bear Behaving Badly
16 September	Michael Palin's New Europe
28 September	Trapped!
15 October	Real Rescues
26 October	The Armstrong & Miller Show
17 November	The Omid Djalili Show
17 November	Who Dares Wins
4 November	Joe's Palace
10 November	A Real Summer
12 November	Capturing Mary
18 November	Cranford
19 November	Animalia
18 December	Oliver Twist
26 December	Ballet Shoes
30 December	The Shadow in the North

=== BBC Two ===
Date	Debut
2 January	This Life + 10
11 January	Bill Oddie Back in the USA
11 February	The Verdict
22 February	Fear, Stress & Anger
19 March	In the Night Garden...
20 March	The Underdog Show
12 April	Roman's Empire
16 April	Get 100
4 May	Maxwell
25 July	Heroes
30 July	India with Sanjeev Bhaskar
29 August	The Restaurant
23 September	Stuart: A Life Backwards
4 October	The Life and Times of Vivienne Vyle
4 October	The Peter Serafinowicz Show
5 October	The Tudors

=== BBC Three ===
Date	Debut
19 March	Rush Hour
21 May	Coming of Age
23 May	Gavin & Stacey
27 September	How Not To Live Your Life

=== BBC Four ===
Date	Debut
9 May	Miss Marie Lloyd: Queen of the Music Hall
31 May	World News Today
15 October	Doctors to Be: 20 Years On
22 October	Fanny Hill
30 October	The History of the World Backwards

=== ITV (1/2/3/4/CITV) ===
Date	Debut
1 February	Benidorm
10 February	Primeval
19 February	The Bad Mother's Handbook
26 February	Instinct
11 March	Fallen Angel
11 March	Atomic Betty
22 March	The Yellow House
4 April	City Lights
22 April	Kingdom
10 June	Talk to Me
11 June	24 Hours with...
18 June	Golden Balls
18 June	The Time of Your Life
9 June	Britain's Got Talent
24 June	News Knight with Sir Trevor McDonald
26 August	The Man Who Lost His Head
3 September	The Alan Titchmarsh Show
19 September	Torn
27 September	Secret Diary of a Call Girl
27 September	The Whistleblowers
8 October	Emu
24 October	Frankenstein
28 October	Half Broken Things
4 November	A Room with a View
11 November	My Boy Jack

=== Channel 4 ===
3 January	Embarrassing Bodies
5 January	Ugly Betty
21 January	Consent
25 January	Skins
14 April	Trick or Treat
30 May	Big Brother 8
16 July	Win My Wage
4 October	Britz
5 October	Other People
12 October	Ladies and Gentlemen
19 October	Plus One
2 November	Free Agents
9 November	The Kevin Bishop Show
26 November	Boy A

=== Five ===
Date	Debut
28 February	Kitchen
12 March	The Beeps
9 April	The Milkshake! Show
7 May	Roary the Racing Car
3 September	Big School

=== Other channels ===
Date	Debut	Network
3 February	The Replacements	Disney Channel
5 March	Shaggy & Scooby-Doo Get a Clue!	Boomerang
9 July	Skunk Fu!	CBBC
6 August	Lola & Virginia	Pop Girl
29 October	Storm Hawks	Cartoon Network

== Channels ==
=== New channels/streaming services ===
Date	Channel
1 March	Discovery Turbo
24 May	Cartoonito
20 July	Film 24
6 August	Pop Girl
9 August	Ftn +1
20 August	Channel 4 +1
1 October	Virgin1
1 October	Virgin1 +1
7 November	Sky Real Lives
7 November	Sky Real Lives +1
7 November	Sky Real Lives 2
19 November	Geo News UK
10 December	Channel 4 HD

=== Defunct channels ===
Date	Channel
28 February	Discovery Kids
1 March	Discovery Wings
13 March	ITV Play
27 March	iBuy
23 May	Toonami
20 July	Bonanza
26 September	ABC1
1 October	Ftn
1 October	Ftn +1
5 October	Radio Music Shop
15 October	UKTV Bright Ideas
7 November	Sky Travel
7 November	Sky Travel +1
7 November	Sky Travel Extra

=== Rebranded channels ===
Date	Old name	New name
13 March	ITV Play	ITV Bingo
15 October	UKTV G2	Dave
15 October	UKTV G2 +1	Dave +1

== Television shows ==
=== Changes of network affiliation ===
Show	Moved from	Moved to
TNA Impact	TWC Fight	Bravo 2
The Apprentice	BBC Two	BBC One
Top of the Pops	BBC Two	BBC One
American Dad!	BBC Two	BBC Three
Prison Break	Five	Sky One
Robot Wars	Five	Challenge
8 Simple Rules	ABC1	Five
Fraggle Rock	CITV	Cartoonito

- ^1 It later moved to Bravo in early 2008

=== Returning this year after a break of one year or longer ===
Programme	Date of original removal	Original channel	Date of return	New channel(s)
Dale's Supermarket Sweep	6 September 2001	ITV	12 February 2007	N/A (Same channel as original)
Teletubbies	16 February 2001	CBBC (BBC Two)	31 March 2007	CBeebies
The Hoobs	13 June 2003	Channel 4	May 2007	N/A (Same channel as original)
The Bionic Woman	13 May 1978	ITV	26 September 2007	N/A (Same channel as original)
To the Manor Born	29 November 1981	BBC One	25 December 2007	N/A (Same channel as original)

== Continuing television shows ==
=== 1920s ===
- BBC Wimbledon (1927–1939, 1946–2019, 2021–present)

=== 1930s ===
- Trooping the Colour (1937–1939, 1946–2019, 2023–present)
- The Boat Race (1938–1939, 1946–2019, 2021–present)

=== 1950s ===
- Panorama (1953–present)
- What the Papers Say (1956–2008)
- The Sky at Night (1957–present)
- Blue Peter (1958–present)

=== 1960s ===
- Coronation Street (1960–present)
- Songs of Praise (1961–present)
- Doctor Who (1963–1989, 1996, 2005–present)
- Match of the Day (1964–present)
- The Money Programme (1966–2010)

=== 1970s ===
- Emmerdale (1972–present)
- Newsround (1972–present)
- Last of the Summer Wine (1973–2010)
- Arena (1975–present)
- One Man and His Dog (1976–present)
- Top Gear (1977–2001, 2002–present)
- Grange Hill (1978–2008)
- Ski Sunday (1978–present)
- Antiques Roadshow (1979–present)
- Question Time (1979–present)

=== 1980s ===
- Children in Need (1980–present)
- Postman Pat (1981, 1991, 1994, 1996, 2004–2008)
- Timewatch (1982–present)
- Countdown (1982–present)
- The Bill (1984–2010)
- Channel 4 Racing (1984–2016)
- Thomas & Friends (1984–2021)
- EastEnders (1985–present)
- Comic Relief (1985–present)
- Casualty (1986–present)
- ChuckleVision (1987–2009)
- Fireman Sam (1987–1994, 2005–2013)
- This Morning (1988–present)
- The Simpsons (1989–present)

=== 1990s ===
- Have I Got News for You (1990–present)
- A Touch of Frost (1992–2010)
- Heartbeat (1992–2010)
- Time Team (1994–2013)
- Room 101 (1994–2007, 2012–2018)
- The National Lottery Draws (1994–2017)
- Top of the Pops 2 (1994–2017)
- Hollyoaks (1995–present)
- Arthur (1996–present)
- Never Mind the Buzzcocks (1996–2015)
- Silent Witness (1996–present)
- Midsomer Murders (1997–present)
- King of the Hill (1997–2010)
- South Park (1997–present)
- Airline (1998–2007)
- Who Wants to Be a Millionaire? (1998–2014)
- Bob the Builder (1998–present)
- Bremner, Bird and Fortune (1999–2010)
- British Soap Awards (1999–2019, 2022–present)
- Ed, Edd n Eddy (1999–2009)
- SpongeBob SquarePants (1999–present)
- Family Guy (1999–2002, 2005–present)
- Holby City (1999–2022)

=== 2000s ===
- The Weakest Link (2000–2012, 2017–present)
- Big Brother (2000–2010, 2011–2018)
- My Family (2000–2011)
- Real Crime (2001–2011)
- Flog It! (2002–2020)
- Foyle's War (2002–2015)
- I'm a Celebrity...Get Me Out of Here! (2002–present)
- Harry Hill's TV Burp (2002–2012)
- Spooks (2002–2011)
- River City (2002–2026)
- Daily Politics (2003–2018)
- New Tricks (2003–2015)
- Peep Show (2003–2015)
- All Grown Up! (2003–2008)
- Tiny Pop (2003–2008)
- Politics Show (2003–2011)
- QI (2003–present)
- The Royal (2003–2011)
- This Week (2003–2019)
- Doc Martin (2004–2022)
- Sea of Souls (2004–2007)
- Supernanny (2004–2008, 2010–2012)
- Shameless (2004–2013)
- Strictly Come Dancing (2004–present)
- The X Factor (2004–2018)
- More4 News (2005—2009)
- Love Soup (2005–2008)
- Come Dine with Me (2005–present)
- Pocoyo (2005–2012, 2017–present)
- The Jeremy Kyle Show (2005–2019)
- It's Me or the Dog (2005–2012)
- Deal or No Deal (2005–2016)
- Sunday AM (2005–2021)
- Mock the Week (2005–2022)
- Dancing on Ice (2006–2014)
- Don't Get Done, Get Dom (2006–2016)
- Hotel Babylon (2006–2009)
- Numberjacks (2006–2009)
- Robin Hood (2006–2009)
- That Mitchell and Webb Look (2006–2010)
- Torchwood (2006–2011)
- Waterloo Road (2006–2015)
- Star Stories (2006–2008)
- Ugly Betty (2006–2010)

== Big Brother racism controversy ==
2007 saw Channel 4 reality show Big Brother involved in two high-profile race-rows.

=== Celebrity Big Brother 5 ===
In January, Jade Goody, her mother Jackie Budden and boyfriend Jack Tweed, along with Danielle Lloyd and Jo O'Meara, were accused of racist bullying towards Bollywood actress Shilpa Shetty. This resulted in protests in India and a record number of complaints to British TV regulator Ofcom and to Channel 4. At the end of May, Channel 4 broadcast an apology for not intervening.

=== Big Brother 8 ===
In response to the incident, Channel 4 introduced a zero-tolerance policy for racism. All housemates in this series were given strict warnings about racism before entering. Just one week after the launch, Emily Parr was removed from the house in the early hours of the morning for saying the word "nigger" to black housemate Charley Uchea just hours before. This incident was widely discussed in the media; viewers complained about Channel 4 broadcasting the word, however, other viewers complained that Emily had been treated unfairly, as she did not use the word in a spiteful context, instead possibly imitating rappers who use the word in their songs.

== Ending this year ==
Date	Show	Channel(s)	Debut(s)
4 January	Green Wing	Channel 4	2004
4 January	CITV weekday afternoon block	ITV	1983
4 January	The Holiday Programme	BBC	1969
4 January	What Not to Wear	BBC	2001
7 January	Just the Two of Us	BBC	2006
12 January	The Price Is Right	ITV	1984
13 January	Soapstar Superstar	ITV	2006
19 January	Airline	ITV	1998
28 January	Grandstand	BBC	1958
13 February	Bill Oddie Back in the USA	BBC	2007
15 February	The Verdict	BBC	2007
3 March	PokerFace	ITV	2006
7 March	BrainTeaser	Channel 5	2002
13 March	Fallen Angel	ITV	2007
16 March	The Vicar of Dibley	BBC	1994
10 April	Life on Mars	BBC	2006
19 April	Sea of Souls	BBC	2004
23 April	Rush Hour	BBC	2007
31 May	The Last Detective	ITV	2003
13 July	Art Attack	ITV	1990
14 July	Popworld	Channel 4	2001
21 July	PointlessBlog	BBC Two	2003
23 July	The Time of Your Life	ITV	2007
28 July	Jekyll	BBC	2007
10 August	Win My Wage	Channel 4	2007
26 August	The Chase	BBC	2006
31 August	Dale's Supermarket Sweep	ITV	1993 & 2007
1 September	School's Out	BBC	2006
13 September	Born to Be Different	Channel 4	2003 & 2006
3 October	Torn	ITV	2007
28 October	Michael Palin's New Europe	BBC	2007
28 November	The Bionic Woman	ITV	1976 & 2007
16 December	Cranford	BBC	2007
22 December	Oliver Twist	BBC	2007
22 December	Parkinson	ITV	1971

== Top 10 highest rated shows of 2007 ==
Rank	Show	Rating
1	EastEnders	14.34 million
2	Doctor Who	13.31 million
3	Rugby World Cup 2007	13.10 million
4	Coronation Street	13.08 million
5	The Vicar of Dibley	13.08 million
6	X Factor results	12.23 million
7	Concert for Diana	12.22 million
8	Strictly Come Dancing	12.09 million
9	The X Factor	11.78
10	Britain's Got Talent	11.58 million

== Deaths ==
Date	Name	Age	Broadcast credibility
7 January	Magnus Magnusson	77	television presenter (Mastermind)
15 January	Barbara Kelly	83	actress and panelist (What's My Line?)
22 January	Anna Cropper	68	actress (The Jewel in the Crown, Midsomer Murders)
30 January	Griffith Jones	97	actor
6 February	Dick Allen	62	television film editor (Hotel du Lac, Portrait of a Marriage)
9 February	Ian Richardson	72	Scottish actor (House of Cards)
20 February	Derek Waring	79	actor (Z-Cars)
21 February	Keith Kyle	81	television presenter (Tonight)
8 March	John Inman	71	actor (Are You Being Served?)
14 March	Gareth Hunt	65	actor (Upstairs, Downstairs, The New Avengers)
30 March	Dave Martin	72	television scriptwriter (Doctor Who, Z-Cars)
2 April	George Sewell	82	actor (Softly, Softly, Randall and Hopkirk (Deceased), Manhunt, The Sweeney)
3 April	Terry Hall	80	ventriloquist on television
27 April	Al Hunter Ashton	49	actor and scriptwriter
26 May	Aubrey Singer	80	television executive
18 June	Bernard Manning	76	comedian
19 June	Tommy Eytle	80	actor (Jules Tavernier in EastEnders)
27 June	Hugh Johns	83	football commentator
9 July	Penny Thomson	56	television producer
9 July	Peter Tuddenham	88	voice actor (Blake's 7)
13 July	Frank Maher	78	television stuntman
20 July	Ivor Emmanuel	79	actor
26 July	John Normington	70	actor (Softly, Softly, Crown Court; Upstairs, Downstairs, My Family and Other Animals)
29 July	Phil Drabble	93	television presenter, author and countryman (One Man and His Dog)
29 July	Mike Reid	67	comedian and actor (EastEnders, Runaround) aka Frank Butcher
5 August	Peter Graham Scott	83	television producer and director
16 August	Clive Exton	77	scriptwriter (Poirot, Jeeves and Wooster, Rosemary & Thyme)
30 August	Michael Jackson	65	writer and television presenter (The Beer Hunter)
6 September	Ronald Magill	87	actor (Emmerdale)
1 October	Ronnie Hazlehurst	79	theme tune composer (Only Fools and Horses, Yes Minister, Are You Being Served?, The Two Ronnies)
1 October	Ned Sherrin	76	television producer (That Was The Week That Was, Not So Much a Programme, More a Way of Life)
6 October	Rodney Diak	86	actor
12 October	Noel Coleman	87	actor (Doctor Who, Emergency – Ward 10, The Adventures of Robin Hood, Z-Cars, Dixon of Dock Green, The Avengers)
16 October	Deborah Kerr	86	actress (A Woman of Substance)
21 October	Peter Moffatt	85	television director (All Creatures Great and Small, Doctor Who)
27 October	Moira Lister	84	South African-born actress (Danger Man, The Avengers)
6 November	Hilda Braid	78	actress (Citizen Smith, Nana Moon in EastEnders)
9 November	Trish Williamson	52	TV weather presenter, journalist, producer and director
19 November	Dick Wilson	91	actor
22 November	Verity Lambert	71	TV producer (Doctor Who)
28 November	Tony Holland	67	television writer (EastEnders)
1 December	Anton Rodgers	74	actor (Fresh Fields, French Fields, May to December)
5 December	Christine Finn	77	actress (Quatermass and the Pit)
5 December	Peter Orton	72	television producer
8 December	Donald Burton	83	actor (Upstairs, Downstairs, Public Eye, Minder)
25 December	Pat Kirkwood	86	actress

== See also ==
- 2007 in British music
- 2007 in British radio
- 2007 in the United Kingdom
- List of British films of 2007
