= Birding with Bill Oddie =

Television birdwatching programme

- Starring: Bill Oddie
- Theme music composer: Xian Vassie
- Country of origin: United Kingdom
- Original language: English
- No. of series: 3
- No. of episodes: 18

Production
- Running time: 30 minutes

Original release
- Network: BBC Two
- Release: 21 February 1997 – 31 March 2000

Related
- Bill Oddie Goes Wild; Bill Oddie's How to Watch Wildlife

Birding with Bill Oddie is a British TV programme, about natural history, presented by Bill Oddie. Three series and eighteen episodes were made, which ran from 21 February 1997 to 31 March 2000 on BBC Two.

Birding with Bill Oddie was only loosely scripted and a lot of Bill's dialogue was spontaneous – he would start to talk and the cameraman would film him. The reason that the viewer almost feels that they are in the hide or on the site with Bill, is that video was used rather than film.

It was the first show in the Bill Oddie wildlife trilogy series. The others were Bill Oddie Goes Wild and Bill Oddie's How to Watch Wildlife.

== Episodes ==
=== Series overview ===
Series	Episodes	Originally released	
Series	Episodes	First released	Last released
1	6	21 February 1997	28 March 1997
2	6	15 May 1998	19 June 1998
3	6	18 February 2000	31 March 2000

=== Series 1 (1997) ===
No. Overall	Episode Number	Title	Airdate	Episode Summary
1	1	Minsmere in Early May	21 February 1997	First ever episode. A day in the life of Britain's best-known bird reserve. Species seen: avocets, stone curlew, sand martins, baby tawny owls, dawn chorus (tits, treecreeper, finches, wren), reed and sedge warblers, nightingale, spoonbill, bittern, marsh harrier and common cranes. Oddie: "If you asked me where I would go to see the biggest number of different species of birds, in Britain, in one day, I'd say Minsmere, in Suffolk, in early May. And that's exactly where I am!"
2	2	Scottish Highlands in June and July	28 February 1997	A quest for the Scottish "Big Six" Species seen: osprey, crossbills, red squirrels, crested tit, (female) capercaillie, Slavonian grebe, golden eagle, dipper, grey and pied wagtails, common sandpiper, ptarmigan and dotterel. Bill attempts to see a male capercaillie, but does not succeed, not helped by the miserable ranger: "You don't always get what you want Bill." "True, but I would still have liked to see a Caper!"
3	3	British Birdwatching Fair in August	7 March 1997	The British Birdwatching Fair: the event of the year that any keen enthusiast should visit Species seen: great crested grebe, moorhen, coot, grey heron, cormorant, tree sparrow, common chaffinch, greenfinch, swallow, sand martin, and house martin.
4	4	East Coast in July and September	14 March 1997	Experience migration on the east coast. Species seen: Arctic tern, guillemot, razorbill, puffin, common whitethroat, little stint, curlew sandpiper and knot. Bill visits the Farne Islands, via Yorkshire, to North Norfolk, in search of migrating birds. "If you asked me to sum up the magic of birding in just one word, that word would be migration".
5	5	Islay in December and January	21 March 1997	Birding in winter. Species seen: tits (blue, great and coal), rock doves, Canada geese, barnacle geese, snow buntings, chough, golden eagle, Greenland white-fronted geese. December and January sees the arrival of millions of birds from the north and east, taking advantage of the milder climate of the British Isles to feed. Oddie travels from his north London garden to the magical Scottish island of Islay, to discover how birds survive the worst types of winter weather.
6	6	Florida	28 March 1997	Combining birding with a holiday for a non-birding family. Species seen: mourning dove, red-bellied woodpecker, great white egret, American kestrel, black vulture, great blue heron, little blue heron, green-backed heron, tricolored heron, snowy egret, reddish egret, sandhill crane, caracara, limpkin, roseate spoonbill, wood stork, pileated woodpecker, spotted sandpiper, double-crested cormorant, anhinga, bald eagle, burrowing owl. Bill takes wife Laura and daughter Rosie to Florida, where they can enjoy the sights while he birdwatches to his heart's content. This trip is covered in the BBC book of the series.

=== Series 2 (1998) ===
Originally broadcast from Friday 15 May 1998 to Friday 19 June 1998. The Dorset, Farmland and Shetland episodes were repeated on Friday 11 February 2000 as a precursor to Series 3.

No. Overall	Episode Number	Title	Airdate	Episode Summary
7	1	Shetland	15 May 1998	Species seen: guillemot, razorbill, puffin, black guillemot, kittiwake, fulmar, gannet, shag, great skuas, Arctic skuas, golden plover, red-throated diver, eider duck, storm-petrel, wheatear, twite, Shetland wren, dunlin, redshank, curlew, Eurasian whimbrel, red-necked phalarope, blue-cheeked bee-eater. Closer to Norway than they are to the Scottish mainland, the Shetland Islands offer the birdwatcher an amazing experience more akin to being in the Arctic than somewhere in the British Isles. It was this episode that contained a spontaneous scene. Bill had got very close to a puffin to photograph it when suddenly his camera ran out of film and starting rewinding quite noisily. Fortunately, no-one cursed the noise of the camera motor or said "cut" and Bill carried on talking, with the puffin completely unperturbed.
8	2	Farmland	22 May 1998	Bill visits farmland in Norfolk in late July. Species seen: stone curlew, grey partridge, sky lark, corn bunting, red-legged partridge, barn owl, little owl, tree sparrow, linnet, European goldfinch, yellowhammer, reed bunting, barn swallow, house martin, Eurasian reed warbler, spotted flycatcher. The past few decades have seen large changes in the way farmland has been managed, sadly often to the detriment of our native wildlife. As a consequence, many birders are put off from spending time birdwatching on farmland. Farmland occupies vast tracts of our countryside and is still home to many bird species, and especially where farming practices are sensitive to the needs of wildlife, the birding can be very rewarding.
9	3	Dorset and the New Forest in May	29 May 1998	Species seen: Dartford warbler, Cetti's warbler, Montagu's harrier, great spotted woodpecker, redstart, spotted flycatcher, stonechat, linnet, tree pipit, nightjar, mute swan, chaffinch, reed warbler and Sandwich tern. With a rich variety of habitats and a mild climate, the counties of Hampshire and Dorset offer a wealth of birdlife. Sites visited include Radipole Lake and Brownsea Island.
10	4	Bill's Beginnings	5 June 1998	Species seen: northern shoveler, common teal, northern lapwing, snipe, goldcrest, collared dove, Eurasian wigeon, pink-footed goose, Egyptian goose, black-tailed godwit, grey phalarope, robin, brambling, twite, brent goose and Pallas's warbler. In a departure from the usual format, Bill spent this programme revisiting some of his earliest birding haunts, including the infamous Bartley Reservoir in Birmingham, Upton Warren, Dungeness bird observatory (using the Heligoland trap), Cley next the Sea and Blakeney Point.
11	5	London	12 June 1998	Bill looks for birds in the capital in late February. Species seen: great crested grebe, grey heron, goldeneye, goosander, smew, bittern, song thrush, black redstart, water pipit, feral pigeon, Canada geese, ruddy duck, mandarin duck, rose-ringed parakeet, gadwall, coot and red kite. Despite the acres of concrete, hundreds of thousands of motor vehicles, and more than ten million people, London still boasts many excellent birding sites. Bill visits Trafalgar Square, Regent's Park, Lee Valley country park, Wraysbury gravel pits, Rainham Marshes and the Chilterns.
12	6	Trinidad and Tobago	19 June 1998	Species seen: bananaquit, palm tanager, blue-grey tanager, spectacled thrush, ruddy ground dove, yellow oriole, least grebe, southern lapwing, white-winged swallow, pied water-tyrant, golden-headed manakin, bay-headed tanager, white-bearded manakin, laughing gull, royal tern, large-billed tern, cattle egret, black skimmer, common potoo, scarlet ibis, white-necked jacobin, tufted coquette, oilbird, red-legged honeycreeper, tropical kingbird, red-crowned woodpecker, rufous-vented chachalaca and red-billed tropicbird. Just ten miles off the coast of Venezuela, the islands of Trinidad and Tobago have a well-deserved reputation as an excellent introduction to the birds of South America. A fortnight's birding should produce around 200 species, covering almost the whole range of neotropical bird families.

=== Series 3 (2000) ===
Originally broadcast from Friday 18 February 2000 to Friday 31 March 2000, preceded by a repeat run of Series 2.

No. Overall	Episode Number	Title	Airdate	Episode Summary
13	1	Holland in Mid-Winter	18 February 2000	Holland in Mid-Winter Species seen: black woodpecker, short-toed treecreeper, geese (barnacle goose, white-fronted goose and bean goose), shore larks, snow buntings, smew, fieldfare, common buzzards, long-eared owl. Oddie: "Holland really isn't all that far from Britain. You just go through the Channel Tunnel, turn left, and it is about a three-hour drive. I have come here for a long weekend in February, for some classic winter birding."
14	2	Israel in Winter	3 March 2000	Species seen: yellow-vented bulbul, Palestine sunbird, Indian house crow, house sparrow and white wagtail, Sinai rosefinch, Lichtenstein's sandgrouse, houbara bustard, saker falcon, kingfisher, swallows, griffon vulture, great white pelican, common crane. Oddie: "It has always rather puzzled me that when it comes to music, Israel is in Europe – they have even won the Eurovision Song Contest! But what about when it comes to birds?" . A letter to Points of View praised the ending of this episode, where the sound and spectacle of thousands of cranes flying in to roost for the night, replaces the usual end credits and music. "Now and again you get something you could not possibly plan for, you couldn't even hope for. I have just arrived here and it was absolutely bucketing down. Literally this very second the clouds have parted, there's a rainbow – isn't that incredible! That is a once in a lifetime experience. I promise you, this is one of the great sights – and sounds – of the bird world. No words, no music, just enjoy it!"
15	3	Majorca in Spring	10 March 2000	Species seen: whinchat, redstart, pied flycatcher, woodchat shrike, Sardinian warbler, nightingale, Audouin's gull, blue rock thrush, crag martin, black vulture, Thekla lark, Marmora's warbler, Cory's shearwater, purple swamphen, great reed warbler, moustached warbler, black-winged stilts, bee-eater, cirl bunting. Oddie: "It is spring, and the island (Majorca) is packed with birds. There's residents, birds that come here to breed, but best of all its migration time. The thing I really love about this time of year is that there are so many birds on the move."
16	4	Poland in The Breeding Season	17 March 2000	Species seen in Poland: red-backed shrike, corncrake, golden oriole, hawfinch, white stork, aquatic warbler, white-winged black terns, great snipe, flycatchers (pied flycatcher, spotted flycatcher, collared flycatcher and red-breasted flycatcher)..
17	5	Wales in Midsummer	24 March 2000	Species seen in Wales: red kite, dipper, nuthatch, redstart, pied flycatcher, wood warbler, little tern, seabird colony, chough, gull colony, house martin, fulmar, Manx shearwater.
18	6	Cape May, New Jersey, in Autumn	31 March 2000	Last ever episode. Species seen: black skimmer, 'peeps' (small wader), peregrine falcon, sharp-tailed sparrow, ruby-throated hummingbird, kestrel. Oddie: "There are just a few places in the world where the very name means birds and birding. Cape May, New Jersey, is one of them."
