= Stephen Moss =

British natural historian, ornithologist, author and television producer

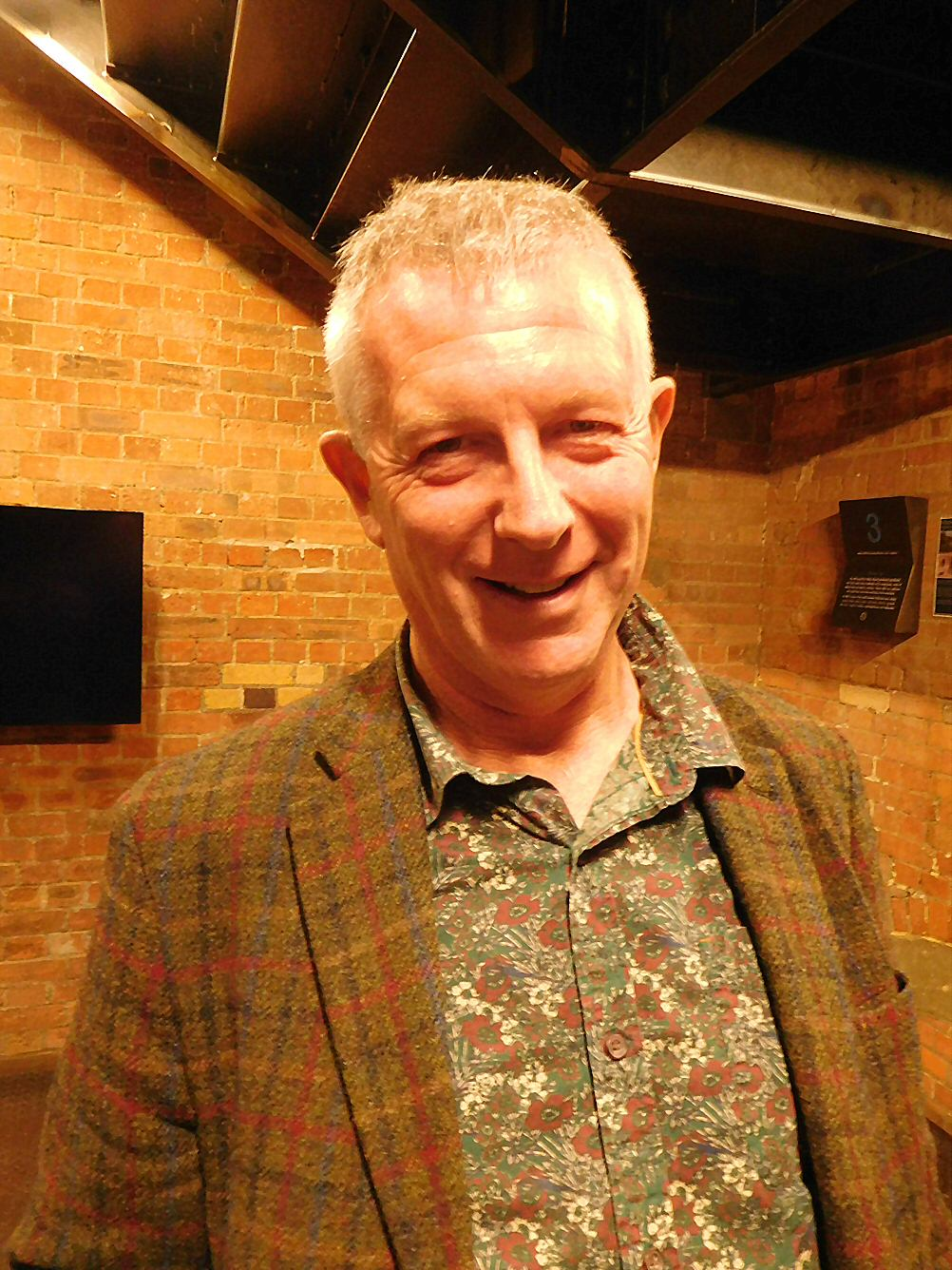
- Moss in 2018
- Born: 25 April 1960; Earls Court, London, England
- Known for: Wildlife documentaries; accompanying books
- Awards: Dilys Breese Medal

Stephen Moss (born in 1960) is a British natural historian, birder, author, and television producer.

== Early life ==
Moss gained an honours degree in English Literature from the University of Cambridge.

== Career ==
Moss is best known for producing wildlife series for the BBC, many of them presented by Bill Oddie, including:

- Birding with Bill Oddie (three series, 1997, 1998, and 2000)

- Bill Oddie Goes Wild (three series, 2001, 2002, and 2003)
- Wild in Your Garden (2003)
- Bill Oddie's How to Watch Wildlife (2004)
- Springwatch with Bill Oddie (2005)
- Birds Britannia (2010)

For some of his series, Moss also authored accompanying books. He left the BBC in 2011 to work as a freelancer. He lectures at Bath Spa University and is a visiting professor at the University of Nottingham.

In 2009, Moss was one of the first recipients of the British Trust for Ornithology's Dilys Breese Medal, at a ceremony at the House of Lords.

One of his works, The Accidental Countryside, was included in the 2025 AQA English Language Paper 2 GCSE exam.

== Personal life ==
Moss is married, with five children, and lives in Somerset, having moved there from West London.

== Radio programmes ==
- A Guide to Garden Birds

== Bibliography ==
- BBC Weather Watch (BBC Books 1992), ISBN 0-563-36486-6, with Paul Simons
- Birds and Weather: A Birdwatchers' Guide (Hamlyn 1995), ISBN 0-600-58679-0
- The Complete Garden Bird Book: How to Identify and Attract Birds to Your Garden (New Holland 1996), ISBN 1-85368-580-1, with Mark Golley
- Birding with Bill Oddie (BBC Books 1997), ISBN 0-563-38748-3, with Bill Oddie
- Attracting Birds to Your Garden (New Holland 1998), ISBN 1-85368-569-0
- Gardening for Birds: How to Help Birds Make the Most of Your Garden (HarperCollins 2000), ISBN 0-00-220168-2 (repr. 2004 as Bird-friendly Garden)
- Bird Boxes and Feeders: Featuring 11 Step-by-step Woodworking Projects (New Holland 2001), ISBN 1-85974-175-4, with Alan & Gill Bridgewater
- The Garden Bird Handbook: How to Attract, Identify and Watch the Birds in Your Garden (New Holland 2003), ISBN 1-84330-124-5
- Understanding Bird Behaviour (New Holland 2003), ISBN 1-84330-151-2
- How to Birdwatch (New Holland 2003), ISBN 1-84330-154-7
- Blokes and Birds (New Holland 2003), ISBN 1-84330-484-8 (ed.)
- Garden Birds (HarperCollins 2004), ISBN 0-00-717614-7
- A Bird in the Bush: A Social History of Birdwatching (Aurum 2004), ISBN 1-85410-993-6
- Everything You Wanted to Know About Birds… But Were Afraid to Ask! (Christopher Helm 2005), ISBN 0-7136-6815-6
- Bill Oddie's How to Watch Wildlife (HarperCollins 2005), ISBN 0-00-718455-7, with Bill Oddie and Fiona Pitcher
- This Birding Life: The Best of The Guardian's "Birdwatch" (Aurum 2006), ISBN 1-84513-180-0
- The Private Life of Birds (New Holland 2006), ISBN 1-84537-422-3
- Birder's Companion (Firefly 2007), ISBN 978-1-55407-212-5
- The Bumper Book of Nature (Square Peg), ISBN 978-0-224-08616-5
- A Sky Full of Starlings: A Diary of a Birding Year (Aurum 2008), ISBN 1-84513-353-6
- Wild Hares and Hummingbirds: The Natural History of an English Village (Square Peg, 2011), ISBN 9780099552468
- Wild Kingdom: Bringing Back Britain's Wildlife (Square Peg, 2016),(ISBN 9780099581635)
- The Robin: A Biography (Square Peg, 2017) ISBN 9781910931318
- The Wren: A Biography (Square Peg, 2018) ISBN 9781910931936
- Mrs Moreau's Warbler: How Birds Got Their Names (Guardian Faber, 2018) ISBN 9781783350902
- Dynasties: The Rise and Fall of Animal Families (BBC Books, 2018) ISBN 978-1785943010 with David Attenborough
- The Accidental Countryside: Hidden Havens for Britain’s Wildlife (Guardian Faber, 2020) ISBN 978-1783351640
- The Swallow: A Biography (Square Peg, 2020) ISBN 9781529110265
- Skylarks with Rosie: A Somerset Spring (Saraband, 2021) ISBN 978-1913393045
- The Swan: A Biography (Square Peg, 2021) ISBN 9781529110371
- The Owl: A Biography (Square Peg, 2023) ISBN 9781529908268
- The Starling: A Biography (Square Peg, 2024) ISBN 9781529908282
