= The Truth About Killer Dinosaurs =

- DVD cover
- Narrated by: Bill Oddie

Production
- Running time: 60 minutes

Original release
- Network: BBC One
- Release: 28 August – 4 September 2005

The Truth About Killer Dinosaurs is a two-part BBC documentary, presented by Bill Oddie, in which a group of scientists test out the strength of dinosaur weaponry using biomechanics. Visual effects are done by MPC. The first episode determines the winner of a battle between Tyrannosaurus and Triceratops, and the second compares the strength of an ankylosaur and Velociraptor. The episodes were broadcast on BBC One in August and September 2005. In the U.S., The Truth About Killer Dinosaurs was known as Dinosaur Face-Off.

== Episodes and animals ==
These are the episodes and the evidence revealed in them.

=== 1 T. rex vs. Triceratops ===
Original air date: August 28, 2005

Tyrannosaurus rex, with a similar design to what is seen on the documentary

==== Tyrannosaurus ====
- Evidence of head injuries on Triceratops indicates Tyrannosaurus rex attacked living Triceratops.
- Using a steel Tyrannosaurus skull, scientists learned that Tyrannosaurus could easily crush a small car.
- Scientists learn that Tyrannosaurus could run at a maximum of 25 miles per hour (40 km/h).
- Scanning an endocast from Tyrannosaurus's skull, scientists theorize that Tyrannosaurus had a brain similar to that of a modern-day alligator.
- Tyrannosaurus had good vision, and a good sense of smell.
- Tyrannosaurus could bite through bone, at a bite force of at least four tons per square inch.

==== Triceratops ====
- Doing a crash test with an artificial Triceratops skull, made of resin, scientists learn that, contrary to portrayals in the media, Triceratops probably did not charge at predators nor other dinosaurs, for its skull would likely break.
- Triceratops may have gored its predators.
- Triceratops was slower (15 miles per hour (24 km/h)) than Tyrannosaurus, but more agile.

==== Outcome ====
An even match. In the episode, it is shown that if the Tyrannosaurus makes a surprise attack, it might kill the Triceratops, but if the herbivore discovers the trap, it could beat his opponent and kill it.

Outcome 1: (Winner, Tyrannosaurus) The T. rex is seen stalking the Triceratops. It suddenly runs out of hiding, and being faster, it overtakes the Triceratops. The T. rex bites into the Triceratops' neck, knocks it over, and eats it.

Outcome 2: (Winner, Triceratops) The T. rex is wandering through the forest looking for food. It soon comes across two fighting Triceratops. When the two are done fighting, the T. rex singles out one of them as a potential target. After picking its victim, the T. rex charges, but the Triceratops sees it just in time and turns around to face its attacker. The T. rex seizes the horn of the Triceratops and breaks it off. The herbivore tries to retreat, but the T. rex chomps on the Triceratops' frill. After doing a mock charge, the Triceratops slashes its horns into the T. rex's belly. The T. rex limps away, falls down, and slowly dies. The Triceratops watches it die and then goes back to foraging.

=== 2 Velociraptor vs. Ankylosaur ===
Original air date: September 4, 2005

==== Velociraptor ====
- Velociraptor was only the size of a turkey.
- Velociraptor had feathers.
- A robotic Velociraptor leg provides evidence that Velociraptor did not disembowel its prey.
- The fossil of a Velociraptor fighting a Protoceratops shows that the Velociraptor pierced the neck of its prey, possibly to stab the vital arteries or the jugular vein.
- Velociraptor's arms were used for balance and agility, much like the wings of an ostrich.
- Along with its claws, Velociraptor's teeth were useful weapons.
- Velociraptor most likely hunted in small packs.
- Teeth of this dinosaur were found among its victims.
- The biomechanical claw provides evidence that the Velociraptor could not penetrate the ankylosaur's armour; it broke when tested on a crocodile's skin.

==== Ankylosaur ====
- Ankylosaur armour was similar to a crocodile's, though significantly harder.
- Young crocodiles have no armour, especially on the neck. Baby ankylosaurs were probably similar.
- A robotic ankylosaur tail shows that the tail club could break wood and bone with ease.
- This dinosaur's armour and club was used only on more threatening predators than Velociraptor.
- In the U.S. version, it was known as Ankylosaurus, although Ankylosaurus itself lived in North America. The ankylosaur in question may in fact have been Pinacosaurus as hinted by the fossil specimen of multiple young that is seen briefly.

==== Outcome ====
The ankylosaur would win, although Velociraptor could easily kill young ankylosaurs, which have easily penetrable armor.

Outcome 1: (Winner, ankylosaur) The ankylosaur is being harassed by two Velociraptors. They try to attack it multiple times, but its armor proves too thick. The ankylosaur eventually drives them away by swinging its tail (one blow would have killed one of the Velociraptors).

Outcome 2: (Winner, Velociraptor) The mother ankylosaur is grazing and her young browse very close to her to avoid danger, but one of them wanders off to an unsafe distance. Two Velociraptors lay a trap around the baby; one of them bursts out of cover to stampede the baby, and the baby escapes the Velociraptor, only to be driven into the clutches of the other one. The two Velociraptors attack the baby, slashing with their claws. The baby tries desperately to defend itself with its tail, but it is inexperienced and is quickly overwhelmed. One of the Velociraptors drives a claw into the baby's neck, killing it. The two Velociraptors have the baby as a meal.

== Minor appearances ==
=== Tarbosaurus ===
- Tarbosaurus appears in the second episode briefly. It fights the ankylosaur, and loses (the tail club breaks its leg).
- It was related to Tyrannosaurus, so it uses the same model with slight adjustments.
- It was the top predator in the Mongolian plains.

=== Protoceratops ===
- Protoceratops appears briefly in two fights against Velociraptor. The first is a re-enactment of the fighting dinosaurs scene, while the second pits it against two Velociraptors, where the latter wins.
- Its beak and bony head were powerful weapons, but because of its small size, Protoceratops was most likely preyed upon by many Mongolian predators.

== See also ==
- Jurassic Fight Club
