= Bill Oddie's How to Watch Wildlife =

- Genre: Documentary
- Presented by: Bill Oddie
- Country of origin: United Kingdom
- Original language: English
- No. of series: 2
- No. of episodes: 16

Production
- Executive producer: Fiona Pitcher
- Producer: Stephen Moss
- Running time: 29 minutes
- Production company: BBC

Original release
- Network: BBC Two
- Release: 7 January 2005 – 7 March 2006

Related
- Birding with Bill Oddie; Bill Oddie Goes Wild

Bill Oddie's How to Watch Wildlife is a British BBC TV programme about natural history that aired on BBC Two presented by Bill Oddie and produced by Stephen Moss. A first series of eight episodes were broadcast from 7 January to 4 March 2005, and a second and final series of eight episodes from 17 January to 7 March 2006.

Bill Oddie published a book with the same name in 2008.
