= Bill Oddie =

English conservationist, entertainer and ornithologist (1941–2026)

Bill Oddie OBE
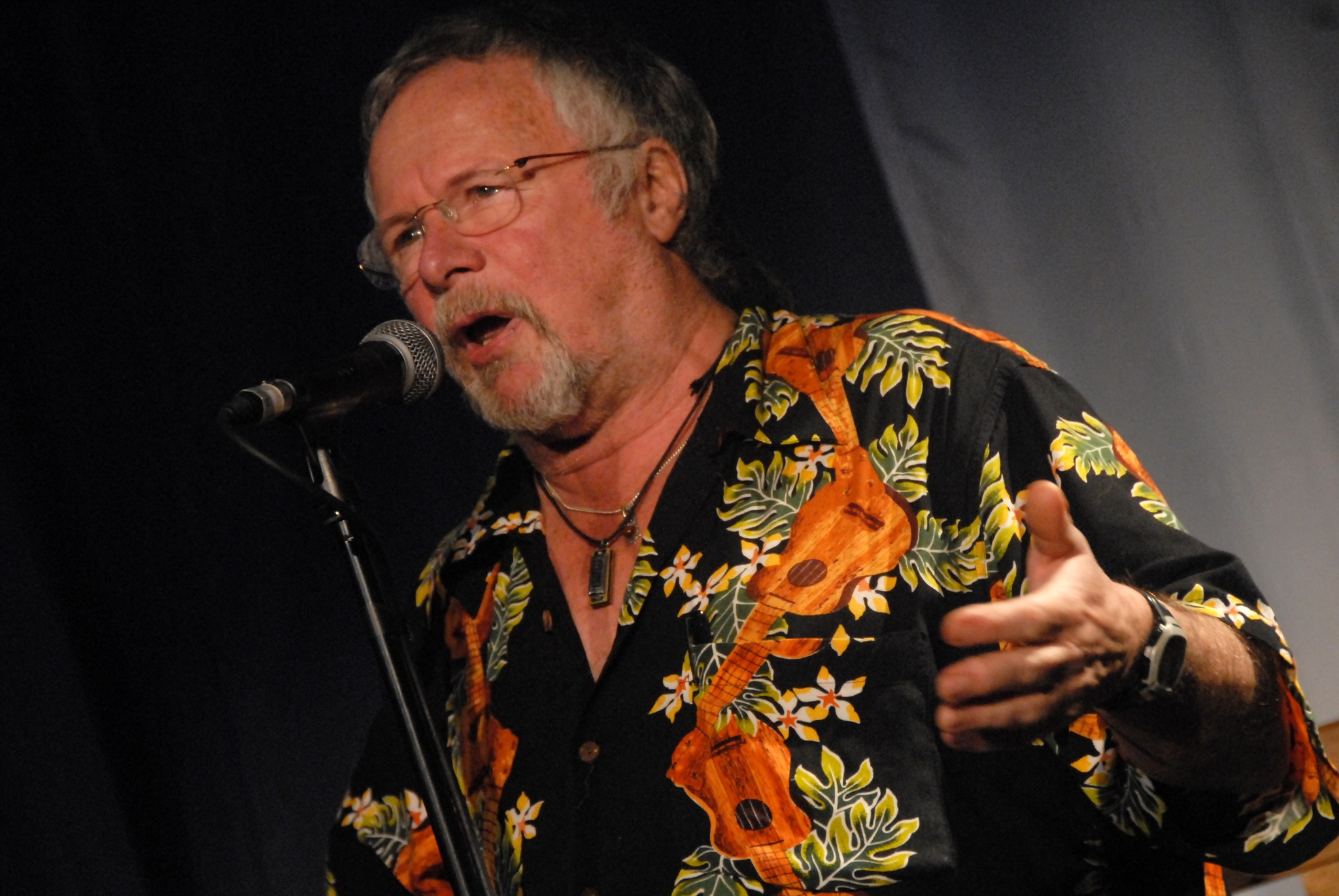
- Oddie in 2007
- Born: William Edgar Oddie; 7 July 1941; Rochdale, Lancashire, England
- Died: 25 July 2026 (aged 85)
- Education: Pembroke College, Cambridge
- Occupations: Actor; artist; comedian; conservationist; musician; ornithologist; songwriter; television presenter; writer
- Years active: 1963–2026
- Spouses: Jeanne M Hart (m. 1966, divorced); Laura Beaumont (m. 1983)
- Children: 3, including Kate Hardie and Rosie Bones
- Bill Oddie's voice Oddie on his past familiarity with Jimmy Savile; First published 19 October 2012
- Website: billoddie.com

William Edgar Oddie (7 July 1941 – 25 July 2026) was an English comedian, conservationist, television presenter and writer. He was a member of the British comedy trio The Goodies.

A birder since his childhood in Quinton, Birmingham, Oddie later established a reputation as a naturalist, conservationist, and television presenter on wildlife issues. Some of his books were illustrated with his own paintings and drawings. His wildlife programmes for the BBC included Springwatch and Autumnwatch, How to Watch Wildlife, Wild in Your Garden, Birding with Bill Oddie, Britain Goes Wild with Bill Oddie and Bill Oddie Goes Wild.

== Early life and education ==
William Edgar Oddie was born on 7 July 1941 in Rochdale, Lancashire, but moved to Birmingham at a young age. He was raised by his father, Harry Oddie, and his grandmother, Emily. His father was assistant chief accountant at the Midlands Electricity Board. His mother, Lilian, was diagnosed with schizophrenia and, for most of his youth, was hospitalised at the Barnsley Hall Hospital psychiatric facility. He was educated at Lapal Primary School, Halesowen Grammar School and King Edward's School, Birmingham, an all-boys direct grant school, where he captained the school's rugby union team. He then studied English literature at Pembroke College, Cambridge, and graduated in 1963.

== Career ==
=== Comedy ===
Whilst at Cambridge University, Oddie appeared in several Footlights productions. One of these, a revue titled A Clump of Plinths, was so successful at the Edinburgh Festival Fringe that it was renamed Cambridge Circus and transferred to the West End in London, then to New Zealand, and to Broadway in September 1964.

From 1964 to 1973, he was a key member of the cast of the BBC radio series I'm Sorry, I'll Read That Again, which was developed from Cambridge Circus. He composed and performed the show's theme tune as Angus Prune and usually performed a comic song which he had composed for each show. Some of his songs were released on the album Distinctly Oddie (Polydor, 1967). He was one of the first performers to parody a rock song, arranging the traditional Yorkshire folk song "On Ilkla Moor Baht'at" in the style of Joe Cocker's hit rendition of the Beatles' "With a Little Help from My Friends" (released on John Peel's Dandelion Records in 1970 and featured in Peel's special box of most-treasured singles), and singing "Andy Pandy" in the style of a brassy soul number such as Wilson Pickett or Geno Washington might perform.

His other contributions to ISIRTA included impressions of Hughie Green and a regular part as Grimbling, the wrinkled retainer of Lady Constance de Coverlet.

While still at Cambridge, Oddie wrote scripts for and appeared briefly in TV's That Was the Week That Was and appeared in Bernard Braden's television series On the Braden Beat in 1964. Later, he was a co-writer and performer in the comedy series Twice a Fortnight with Graeme Garden, Terry Jones, Michael Palin and Jonathan Lynn. Then he was a co-writer and performer in the comedy series Broaden Your Mind with Tim Brooke-Taylor and Graeme Garden, becoming a cast member for the second series.

Oddie, Brooke-Taylor and Garden then co-wrote and appeared in their television comedy series The Goodies (1970–1982). The Goodies also released records, including "Father Christmas Do Not Touch Me"/"The In-Betweenies", "The Funky Gibbon" (co-written by Oddie with Dave MacRae) and "Black Pudding Bertha", which were hit singles in 1974–75. They reformed briefly in 2005 for a successful 13-date tour of Australia.

Oddie, Brooke-Taylor and Garden voiced characters on the 1983 animated children's programme Bananaman.

In the Amnesty International show A Poke in the Eye (With a Sharp Stick), Oddie, Brooke-Taylor and Garden sang their hit song "Funky Gibbon". They also appeared on Top of the Pops with the song. Together with Garden (who is a qualified medical doctor), Oddie co-wrote many episodes of the television comedy series Doctor in the House, including most of the first season and all of the second season. He occasionally appeared on the BBC Radio 4 panel game I'm Sorry I Haven't a Clue, on which Garden and Brooke-Taylor were regular panellists. Garden and Oddie wrote, but did not perform in, a thirteen-episode science-fiction sitcom called Astronauts that aired on Central and ITV from 1981 to 1983. The show was set in an international space station in the near future.

=== Natural history ===
Oddie's first published work was an article about the birdlife of Birmingham's Bartley Reservoir in the West Midland Bird Club's 1962 Annual Report. (He is first credited in the 1956 report, in which reports of his bird observations are tagged with his initials "WEO".) He wrote a number of books about birds and birdwatching as well as articles for many specialist publications including British Birds, Birdwatching Magazine and Birdwatch.

He discussed bird-song recordings with Derek Jones in a 1973 BBC Radio 4 programme called Sounds Natural. Oddie was involved in the successful identification of Britain's first-ever recorded Pallas's reed bunting on Fair Isle in 1976.

One of Oddie's first forays into the world of television natural history was as a guest on Animal Magic in December 1977. Another early natural history radio appearance was in October 1978, as the guest on Radio 4's Through My Window, discussing the birds of Hampstead Heath.

On 30 July 1985, he was the subject of a 50-minute Nature Watch Special: Bill Oddie – Bird Watcher, in which he was interviewed by Julian Pettifer at places where he had spent time birding, including Bartley Reservoir, the Christopher Cadbury Wetland Reserve at Upton Warren, RSPB Titchwell Marsh and Blakeney Point.

Oddie then hosted a number of successful nature programmes for the BBC, many produced by Stephen Moss, including:

- The Great Bird Race (1983; Channel 4)
- The Great Kenyan Bird Safari (BBC)
- Favourite Walks: "A Bird Walk" (1985; BBC; filmed on Fair Isle)
- Worldwise: "The Bird Business" (1985; Channel 4)
- Oddie in Paradise (1985; BBC)
- Wild Weekends (TV AM)
- Flight to Eilat (Channel 4)
- Bird in the Nest (two series, 1994 and 1995)
- Birding with Bill Oddie (three series, 1997, 1998 and 2000)
- Bill Oddie Goes Wild (three series, 2001, 2002 and 2003)
- Wild in Your Garden (2003)
- Britain Goes Wild (2004)
- Bill Oddie in Tiger Country (2004)
- Bill Oddie's How to Watch Wildlife (two series, 2005 and 2006; also on DVD)
- Seven Natural Wonders (London edition) (2005)
- The Truth About Killer Dinosaurs (2005; also on DVD)
- Springwatch (2005–2008)
- Autumnwatch (2006–2008)
- Bill Oddie Back in the USA (2007)
- Bill Oddie's Top Ten Birds (2007; BBC Four)
- 100 Years of Wildlife (2007)
- Bill Oddie's Wild Side (2008)
- Bill Oddie's Top 10 (2008)

The first broadcast, in 2004, of Britain Goes Wild set a record for its timeslot of 8 pm on BBC Two of 3.4 million viewers, one million more than the Channel 4 programme showing at that time. Britain Goes Wild, renamed Springwatch the following year, became a wildlife broadcasting phenomenon, attracting over 4 million viewers.

He became president of the West Midland Bird Club in 1999, having been vice-president since 1991, and was a former member of the council of the RSPB. Oddie was also a President of the League Against Cruel Sports and a vice-president of the British Trust for Conservation Volunteers. He practised as a bird ringer but allowed his licence to lapse.

In 2003, Oddie set up a half-marathon to raise money for various wildlife charities in his birth town of Rochdale.

In 2011, Oddie featured as an investigator in Snares Uncovered: killers in the countryside.

=== Music ===
Oddie wrote original music at the University of Cambridge for the Footlights and later wrote comic songs for I'm Sorry, I'll Read That Again. He also wrote a number of comic songs for the Goodies, most of which he also performed.

In the 1960s and early 1970s, Oddie released a number of singles and at least one album. One of the former, issued in 1970 on John Peel's Dandelion Records label (Catalogue No: 4786), was "On Ilkla Moor Baht 'at", performed in the style of Joe Cocker's "With a Little Help from My Friends". The B-side, "Harry Krishna", featured the Hare Krishna chant, substituting the names of contemporary famous people called Harry, including Harry Secombe, Harry Worth, Harry Lauder and Harry Corbett, as well as puns such as "Harry [Hurry] along now" and "Harrystotle [Aristotle]" and ending with "Harry-ly [I really] must go now". Both tracks appear on the compilation CD Life Too, Has Surface Noise: The Complete Dandelion Records Singles Collection 1969–1972 (2007). In 1966 he was credited as the vocalist with Spencer's Washboard Kings on "Five Feet Two" (Rayrick LCR1001a). The vocalist on the B-side of this 45 rpm single, "If You Knew Susie", was Jeanne Hart, Oddie's future wife.

He played the drums and saxophone and appeared as Cousin Kevin in a production of the Who's rock opera Tommy by the London Symphony Orchestra and the English Chamber Choir at the Rainbow Theatre, Finsbury Park, London, on 13 and 14 December 1973. He also contributed vocals to keyboardist Rick Wakeman's fifth studio album, Criminal Record (1977).

Oddie recorded a single, "Superspike", with John Cleese and a group of UK athletes, billed the "Superspike Squad", to fund the latter's attendance at the 1976 Summer Olympics in Montreal. He co-produced the record with Stephen Shane.

In 1986, Oddie took part in the English National Opera production of the Gilbert and Sullivan comic opera The Mikado, in which he appeared in the role of the Lord High Executioner, taking over the role from Eric Idle. During the early 1990s Oddie was a DJ for London-based jazz radio station 102.2 Jazz FM.

In 2007, Oddie appeared on the BBC series Play It Again.

In November 2010, he agreed, along with fellow members of the Goodies, to rerelease their 1970s hit "The Funky Gibbon" to raise funds for the International Primate Protection League's Save the Gibbon appeal.

=== Other television and voice work ===
Oddie appeared as the hapless window cleaner in the Eric Sykes comedy film The Plank in 1967. He also presented the live children's Saturday morning entertainment show Saturday Banana (ITV/Southern Television) during the late 1970s. In the late 1980s he was a presenter of the BBC TV show Fax (a show about 'facts').

In 1981, he appeared as a Telethon celebrity in New Zealand, hosted by TV1. He voiced Asterix in the UK dub of the 1989 animated film Asterix and the Big Fight.

In 1992, he was a guest star in the US comedy television series Married... with Children for a three-part episode set in England.

He voiced the chimney sweep in the 1996 film The Willows in Winter.

In 1997 and 1998, he appeared on the Channel 4 archaeological programme Time Team, as the team excavated a Roman villa site in Turkdean, Gloucestershire.

In 2002, Oddie became the third person to decline to appear on This Is Your Life, but changed his mind a few hours later. During the programme, he also discussed how Freddy Marks from the children's series Rainbow and Rod, Jane and Freddy had once saved him from drowning while on holiday in the Seychelles, a story he later repeated on Would I Lie to You?.

Oddie was the compère of a daytime BBC gameshow, History Hunt, in 2003, and appeared in the Doctor Who audio drama Doctor Who and the Pirates. In 2004, he appeared on the first ever episode of the BBC series Who Do You Think You Are?, in which he looked into his ancestry: he was visibly moved by its revelations. In 2005, he took part in Rolf on Art – the big event at Trafalgar Square and in September that year was also a celebrity guest along with Lynda Bellingham on the ITV1 programme Who Wants to Be a Millionaire. He also gave opinions on 100 greatest cartoons on Channel 4 that year, talking about Tom and Jerry and cartoon incidents such as the "Asses of Fire skit" in South Park: Bigger, Longer and Uncut.

In 2006, he appeared in the BBC show Never Mind the Buzzcocks, and also appeared on the topical quiz show 8 Out of 10 Cats. He was also the voice behind many B&Q adverts throughout 2006/2007. On 25 May 2007, Oddie made a cameo appearance in Ronni Ancona's new comedy sketch show, Ronni Ancona & Co.

Also in 2007, three artists each painted a portrait of Oddie, as part of the BBC programme Star Portraits with Rolf Harris. One of the artists, Mark Roscoe, later revealed a dislike of Oddie, claiming to have included hidden insults in his work.

He hosted the genealogy-based series My Famous Family, broadcast on UKTV History in 2007. In 2008, Oddie was a guest on Jamie Oliver's television special Jamie's Fowl Dinners, talking about free-range chickens. He also made guest appearances as himself on the BBC CBeebies show The Green Balloon Club during 2011 and 2012.

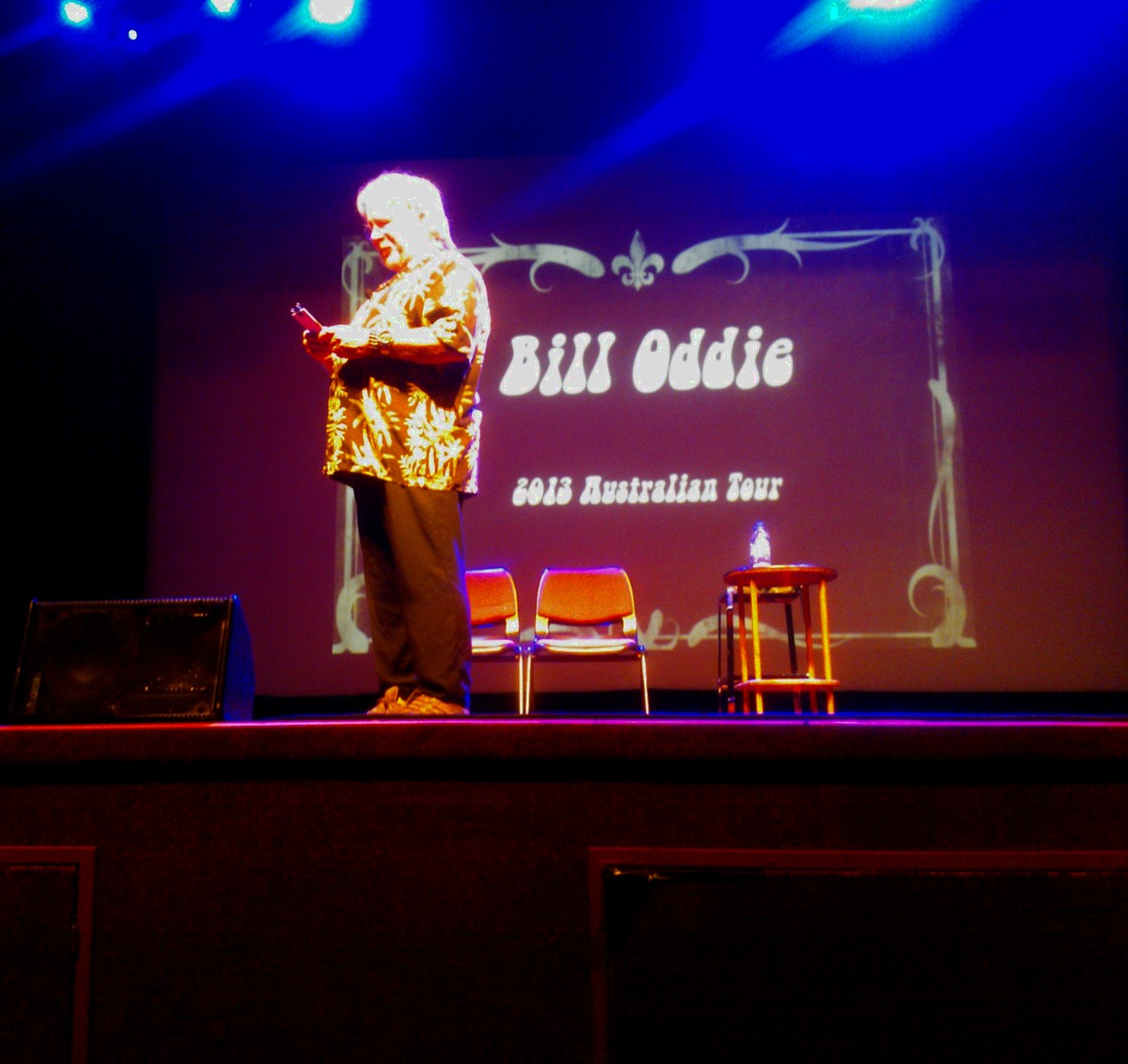
Oddie performing at the Astor Theatre in Perth, Western Australia, 2013

Oddie undertook an Australian tour during June 2013 in all of the mainland states' capital cities—Brisbane, Sydney, Melbourne, Adelaide and Perth—in a series of one-off shows, An Oldie but a Goodie. A video message from Tim Brooke-Taylor and Graeme Garden was shown during the performances. Oddie appeared on both The Project and Adam Hills Tonight TV shows during the tour; he also filmed a guest-programming spot for the ABC-TV's all-night music video show Rage.

In February 2015, he appeared in The Keith Lemon Sketch Show as the narrator of the sketch "Ed Sheeran Watch".

He appeared as a contestant on a celebrity edition of Fifteen to One in August 2015 and the following month he appeared on Through the Keyhole.

Oddie appeared three times on the programme Pointless Celebrities, the most recent appearance being in 2016.

In 2017, Oddie appeared in three episodes of The Real Marigold Hotel.

In 2018, he featured on the programme The Two Ronnies: In Their Own Words. In 2019, he appeared on the show The Inbetweeners: Fwends Reunited.

In 2020, Oddie appeared in the documentary Celebrity Britain by Barge: Then & Now.

== Personal life and death ==
=== Family ===
In 1966, Oddie married Jeanne Hart, and they had two daughters, including the actress Kate Hardie. The couple later divorced.

In 1983, Oddie married Laura Beaumont-Giles. The couple worked on a variety of children's projects, including film scripts, drama and comedy series, puppet shows and books. They had a daughter (who is a musician who uses the stage name Rosie Bones), born in October 1985, and lived in Hampstead, northwest London.

=== Mental health ===
Oddie experienced depression for most of his life before being diagnosed with clinical depression in 2001. In March 2009, he was reportedly admitted to Capio Nightingale psychiatric hospital in Marylebone for treatment. His then agent, David Foster, said: "Bill gets these bouts every two or three years where he gets down for about two weeks and recovers. He sometimes goes into hospital or takes a break or has a change of scenery to recharge his batteries."

In January 2010, Oddie spoke to the media, revealing that he had two separate stays in different hospitals, only being discharged "in time for Christmas". He said that he was dealing with depression and bipolar disorder, describing the period as "probably the worst 12 months of my life". He stated that he planned to meet BBC executives to discuss his return to television work.

His illness meant that Oddie did not appear in the 2009 and 2010 series of Springwatch, although he made a guest appearance in the penultimate episode of the latter. He later said that he was dismissed from Springwatch and that this had caused the depressive illness.

He presented the BBC Radio 4 Appeal programme on 10 August 2014 on behalf of the charity Bipolar UK. He revealed that, as a consequence of his bipolar disorder, he had attempted suicide during one of his depressive episodes. On the UK TV programme Who Do You Think You Are?, he attributed his depression and bipolar disorder to his minimal and painful relationship with his mother.

=== Political views ===
Oddie supported the Green Party. He was part of the steering committee of Environmentalists for Europe. In October 2014, on the BBC's Sunday Morning Live, he said that he wanted a limit on the number of children that British families can have. He added that he was "very often ashamed" to be British, calling them "a terrible race".

=== Death ===
Oddie died on 25 July 2026, aged 85. A self-described humanist and atheist, Oddie told loved ones before his death that he wished to be remembered with a humanist funeral to celebrate his life and permitted his ashes to be scattered on Hampstead Heath.

== Honours ==
On 16 October 2003, he was made an OBE for his service to wildlife conservation in a ceremony at Buckingham Palace. In June 2004, Oddie and Johnny Morris were jointly profiled in the first episode of a three-part BBC Two series The Way We Went Wild, about television wildlife presenters. In May 2005, he received the British Naturalists' Association's Peter Scott Memorial Award from BNA president David Bellamy, "in recognition of his great contribution to our understanding of natural history and conservation." He was also a recipient of the RSPB Medal.

On 30 June 2009, he was proposed for inclusion in the Birmingham Walk of Stars, with the public invited to vote.

== Bibliography ==
- Bill Oddie Unplucked: Columns, Blogs and Musings ISBN 978-1-4729-1531-3 (Bloomsbury, 2015)
- Bill Oddie's Introduction to Birdwatching (Subbuteo Books, 2002)
- Bill Oddie's Colouring Guide to Birds (Piccolo, 1991)
- Bill Oddie's Little Black Bird Book
- Bill Oddie's Little Black Bird Book (paperback with additional material)
- Bill Oddie's Gone Birding
- The Big Bird Race (with David Tomlinson; Collins, 1983)
- Follow That Bird!
- Gripping Yarns (Christopher Helm, 2000)
- Bird in the Nest
- Bill Oddie's How to Watch Wildlife
- One Flew into the Cuckoos Egg (Autobiography)
- Tales of a Ludicrous Bird Gardener (2017)

Co-written with Kate Humble and Simon King:

- Springwatch and Autumnwatch (2007)

Co-written with the other members of the Goodies:

- The Goodies File
- The Goodies Book of Criminal Records
- The Goodies Disaster Movie

Co-written with Laura Beaumont:

- The Toilet Book (or 11 & ½ Minutes a Day and How Not to Waste Them) (Methuen, 1984, ISBN 978-0-413-56910-3)

=== Contributions ===
- Confessions of a Scilly Birdman, David Hunt; Croom Helm, 1985. ISBN 0-7099-3724-5 (foreword and postscript)
- Birds in the Yorkshire Museum, Michael Denton; North Yorkshire County Council, 1995. ISBN 0-905807-10-3 (foreword)
- Birds of Brent Reservoir, Leo Batten, Roy Beddard, John Colmans & Andrew Self (editors); Welsh Harp Conservation Group, 2002. ISBN 0-9541862-0-6 (foreword)
- Bird Brain of Britain, Charles Gallimore & Tim Appleton; Christopher Helm, 2004. ISBN 0-7136-7036-3 (foreword)
- Blokes and Birds, Stephen Moss; New Holland Publishers. ISBN 1-84330-484-8 (foreword)
- The New Birds of the West Midlands, Graham and Janet Harrison (West Midland Bird Club, 2005) ISBN 0-9507881-2-0 (foreword)

== Discography ==
=== Albums ===
| Year | Title | Label | Cat No. |
|---|---|---|---|
| 1967 | Distinctly Oddie | Polydor | 582 007 (mono) / 583 007 (stereo) |

=== Singles ===
| Date | A-side | B-side | Label | Cat. No. | Notes |
|---|---|---|---|---|---|
| Jul 1964 | Nothing Better To Do | Traffic Island | Parlophone | R 5153 | |
| Oct 1965 | The Knitting Song | Ain't Got Rhythm | Parlophone | R 5346 | |
| Apr 1966 | I Can't Get Through | Because She Is My Love | Parlophone | R 5433 | |
| Nov 1966 | Nobby Stiles March | Old Boutique | Polydor | 56123 | Unreleased – Test-pressing |
| Apr 1969 | Jimmy Young | Irish Get Out | Decca | F 12903 | |
| Jan 1970 | On Ilkla Moor Baht'at | Harry Krishna | Dandelion | 4786 | |
| Feb 1976 | Superspike (Part 1) | Superspike (Part 2) | Bradley's | BRAD 7606 | |

== In popular culture ==
In the fictional world of comedy character Alan Partridge, Oddie is an unseen presence in Alan's life, buying him dressing gowns for Christmas and being part of a radicalised Royal Society for the Protection of Birds (RSPB). He was also referenced, often humorously, by the hosts of Top Gear.
