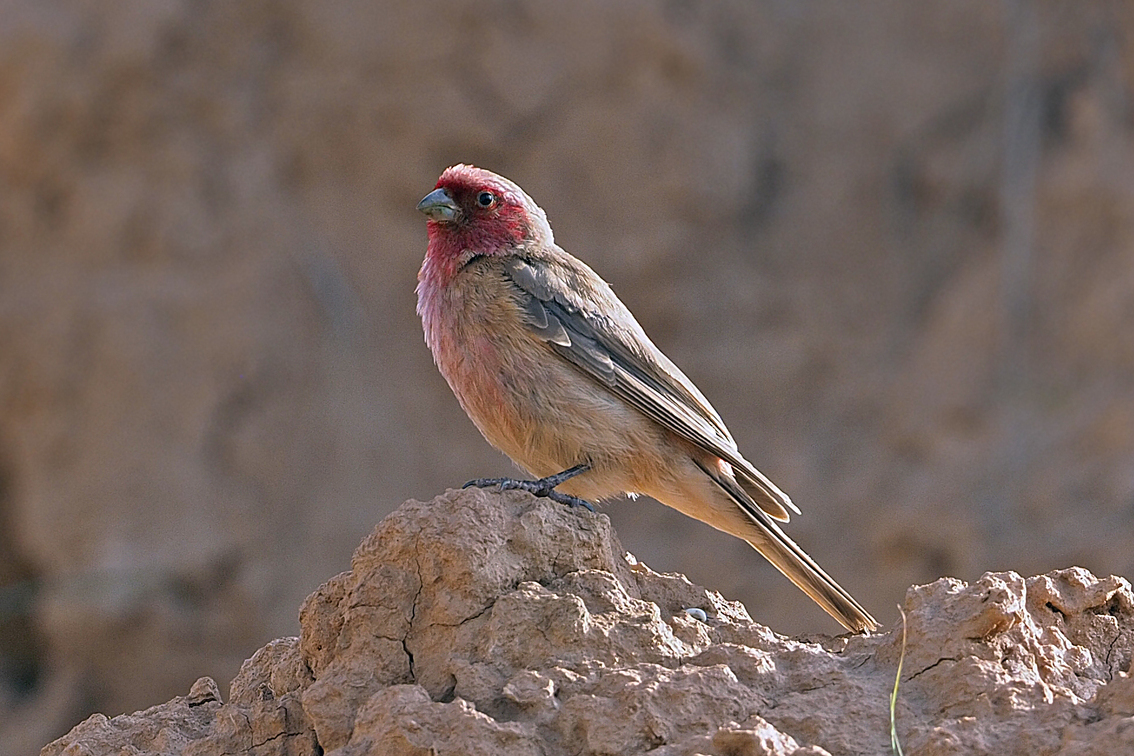
- Male
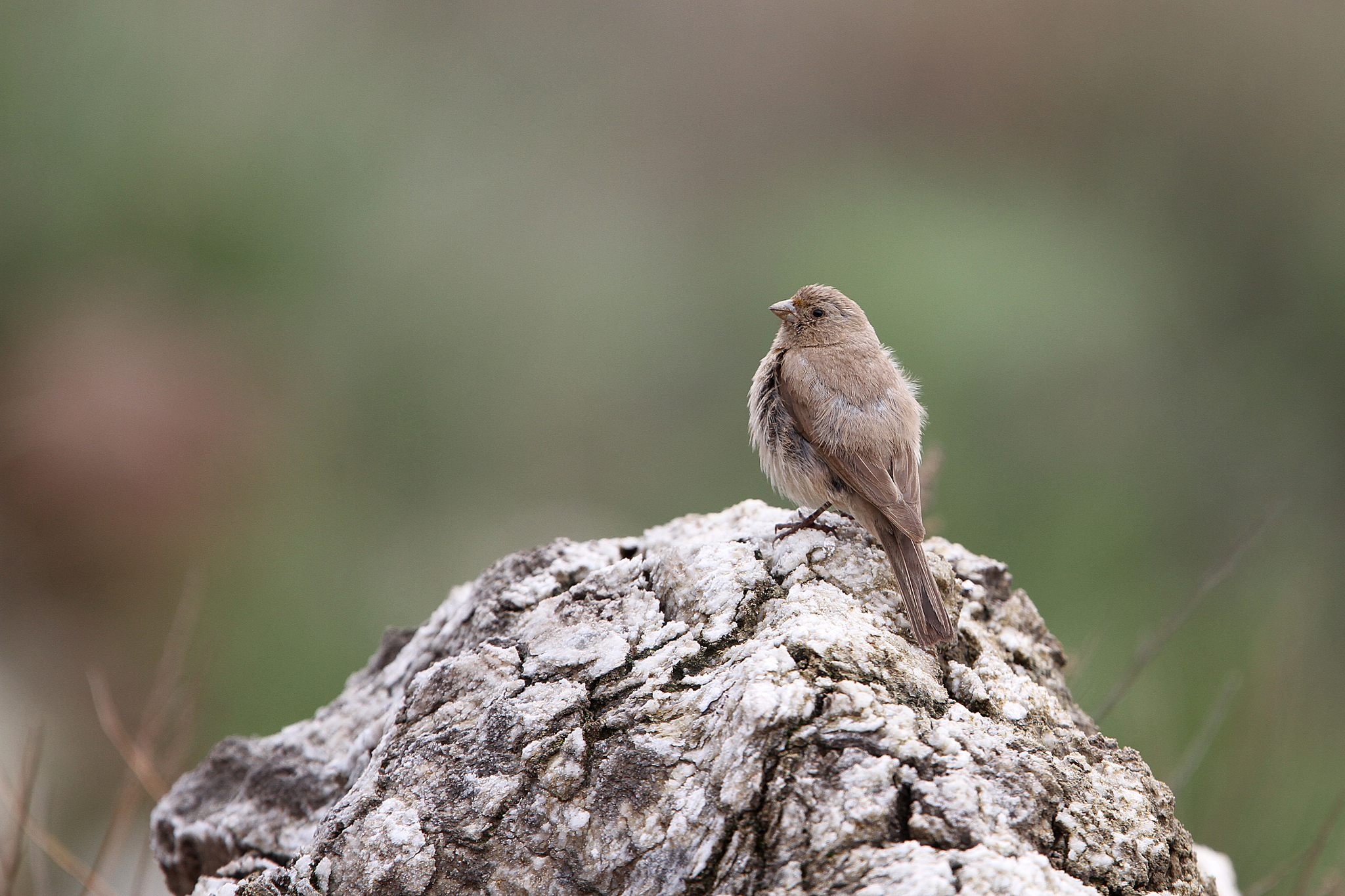
- Female

Conservation status
- Least Concern (IUCN 3.1)

Scientific classification
- Kingdom: Animalia
- Phylum: Chordata
- Class: Aves
- Order: Passeriformes
- Family: Fringillidae
- Subfamily: Carduelinae
- Genus: Carpodacus
- Species: C. stoliczkae

Binomial name
- Carpodacus stoliczkae (Hume, 1874)

= Pale rosefinch =

Species of bird

The pale rosefinch (Carpodacus stoliczkae) is a species of finch in the family Fringillidae. It is found in Afghanistan and China. It was formerly considered conspecific with the Sinai rosefinch. Its natural habitat is hot deserts.
