= Win My Wage =

2007 British game show

- Genre: Game show
- Created by: Simon Broadley
- Presented by: Nick Hancock
- Country of origin: United Kingdom
- Original language: English
- No. of series: 1
- No. of episodes: 20

Production
- Production location: The Leeds Studios
- Running time: 45 minutes (inc. adverts)
- Production company: Hotbed Media

Original release
- Network: Channel 4
- Release: 16 July – 10 August 2007

Win My Wage is a British daytime game show that aired on Channel 4, invented by Simon Broadley and presented by Nick Hancock. Each day a contestant has to decide which of eight strangers earned the highest annual wage. The contestant uses facts given about each of the strangers in order to eliminate one stranger in each round and ultimately to decide who earns the most. The programme aired in the same slot as Deal or No Deal when that programme took a four-week break in Summer 2007.

== Format ==
There is one contestant each day who is faced with eight complete strangers (known in the programme as "wage-earners"), all of whom wear black T-shirts with their names printed on. They only speak once in play, at the beginning of the game, by saying their name, the town or city in which they live, and asking a rhetorical question of whether they earn the highest amount of money.

Each round eliminates one wage-earner and the wage that person earns. The aim is for the contestant to eliminate the lower wages first in order to keep the highest prizes remaining. The rounds are as follows:

1. The contestant must choose one of the eight wage-earners to eliminate by first impressions only.
2. Five significant facts are revealed about each of the seven remaining wage-earners.
3. The wage-earners are given three 'yes or no' questions about what they do in their spare time.
4. The contestant learns more about the remaining wage-earners' school days.
5. The wage-earners are asked another series of 'yes or no' questions.

After these rounds, the contestant must decide which of the three remaining wage-earners earns the highest amount. At this point, the contestant has the option of being told the occupations of the three remaining wage-earners, but without any indication of which is which.

If the highest annual wage (of the three that remain at the end) is guessed correctly, the contestant wins that wage. However, if the contestant chose to reveal the three occupations, only half of the annual wage is awarded. If the wage-earner chosen by the contestant is not the highest-earning of the three, the contestant wins nothing. The wage-earner whom the contestant chose also receives £3000, regardless of actual wage; thus each of the wage-earners has an incentive to lead the contestant to think that he/she is the highest earner.
