= Pied flycatcher =

Pied flycatcher may refer to several species of birds:

- European pied flycatcher, found in Eurasia and northern and western Africa
- Pied flycatcher, an alternate name for the pied monarch, found in Australia
