= News Knight with Sir Trevor McDonald =

- Directed by: Lissa Evans
- Presented by: Sir Trevor McDonald
- Starring: Marcus Brigstocke
- Country of origin: United Kingdom
- Original language: English
- No. of series: 1
- No. of episodes: 7

Production
- Production company: Hat Trick Productions

Original release
- Network: ITV
- Release: 24 June – 5 August 2007

Related
- Have I Got News for You

News Knight with Sir Trevor McDonald, more commonly referred to as simply News Knight, is a British television panel show shown on ITV, at 22:00 on Sunday nights. Fronted by Sir Trevor McDonald and in a similar style to the BBC One programme Have I Got News for You, its format featured three comedians and McDonald satirising the week's news. Marcus Brigstocke was a permanent member of the "news team".

News Knight is produced by Hat Trick Productions, the same production company as Have I Got News For You. The programme's title is a pun on McDonald's knighthood and on the BBC Two current affairs programme Newsnight. The show is therefore referred to as "News Knight with Sir Trevor McDonald" to avoid confusion.

== Format ==
News Knight is about the news broadcast that McDonald has always wanted to do. As a result, it is he who sets the news agenda. This is mainly in the form of McDonald's top three stories of the week, which are discussed with the panel. Therefore, it is more akin to a traditional news broadcast rather than a talk show, but with a comic agenda.

Throughout the show are other features, which normally feature internet clips from sites such as YouTube. There are some recurring topics that appear in these clips. These include Planet Stupid, which involves some bizarre and stupid news story from anywhere around the world, and Young People Can Be Idiots, which features clips of teenagers and young adults doing something idiotic. In one episode, there was a spin-off to this feature called Old People Can Be Idiots.

== Episodes ==
Episode	Air Date	Guests
Series 1 – 2007
1. 1-1	24 June 2007	Reginald D. Hunter, Clive Anderson
2. 1–2	1 July 2007	Reginald D. Hunter, Alexander Armstrong
3. 1–3	8 July 2007	Frankie Boyle, Clive Anderson
4. 1–4	15 July 2007	Sue Perkins, Reginald D. Hunter
5. 1–5	22 July 2007	Frankie Boyle, Clive Anderson
6. 1–6	29 July 2007	Reginald D. Hunter, Michael McIntyre
7. 1–7	5 August 2007	Alun Cochrane, Clive Anderson

== Comments and criticism ==
=== McDonald's credibility ===
The reaction to News Knight has been mixed. Some have been critical of McDonald's own performances, claiming that he is a newsreader and therefore should not do comedy. Jim Shelley said that, "A legendary, great man (ITV's answer to David Attenborough), he's surely too dignified to be introducing sections like Saudis Do the Funniest Things, or Gay Or Blind?"

=== Similarity with other shows ===
Other critics have complained about the similarity between News Knight and similar shows such as Have I Got News for You. The Daily Record said, "Nicely done. But it's basically a rip-off of HIGNFY... ITV really need to get a grip with this copycat malarkey. First they try to pass off Tycoon as something other than a lazy copy of BBC's The Apprentice. Now a poor man's take on Auntie's HIGNFY – a TV show of such quality people should be arrested for copying it. Or not watching it."

=== Bernard Manning joke ===
The first episode attracted around 200 complaints after McDonald made a joke about the late controversial comedian Bernard Manning. In a section called Racist and Dead, McDonald said, "This week it's the turn of incompetent, narrow-minded northerner: Bernard Manning. Personally, I never thought of Bernard Manning as a racist comic; just a fat, white bastard." Amongst the people who complained was Jim Bowen, who said the comment was, "Appalling." However, an ITV spokesman defended it as satire, saying, "I'm sure Bernard would find the whole thing hilarious."

However, Ofcom cleared McDonald and ITV of charges of racism, saying the joke was justified in context and that McDonald's was only parodying Manning. Ofcom said;

"In the case of this programme, Sir Trevor McDonald obviously, and intentionally, drew on Bernard Manning's own style of humour, which frequently played on the real or apparent prejudices of his audience. The comments were clearly intended to parody Manning's own comedy, where he claimed he was not himself racist, but simply made 'jokes' based on racial stereotypes. It was in such a context that Sir Trevor McDonald could therefore state that he did not consider Manning to be a racist but then went on to say that he was '...a fat white bastard'."
