= Redstart =

Number of unrelated songbirds

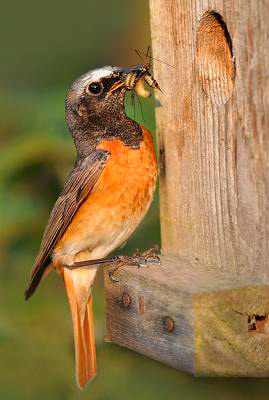
Male Common Redstart

Redstart is a name used for a number of songbirds that are not closely related to each other:

Old world flycatcher family (Muscicapidae)

- Phoenicurus, 14 species found in Africa, Asia and Europe
  - Common redstart, a European species often known simply as "redstart"
- White-bellied redstart, an Asian species not closely related to the Phoenicurus redstarts

New world warbler family (Parulidae)

- Myioborus, 12 species found in North and South America, also known as "whitestarts"
- American redstart, a species found in North and South America, not closely related to the genus Myioborus
