= Bill Oddie Back in the USA =

- Genre: Documentary
- Presented by: Bill Oddie
- Country of origin: United Kingdom
- Original language: English
- No. of series: 1
- No. of episodes: 6

Production
- Production locations: United States; Canada
- Running time: 30 minutes

Original release
- Network: BBC Two
- Release: 11 January – 13 February 2007

Bill Oddie Back in the USA is a British television programme, about natural history, written and presented by Bill Oddie and screened in early 2007.

The formal description used by the BBC said:

Long before he became known as a wildlife presenter, Bill toured the states with fellow Cambridge graduates John Cleese and Tim Brooke-Taylor. Now, 43 years on he's touring the States again to check out the creatures there wasn't time to see the first time round.

The series' sound recordist, Chris Watson, occasionally appeared on-screen. The series producer was Nigel Pope.

== Episodes ==
=== New York ===
First broadcast on 11 January.

The series starts in New York City where Bill discovers a wealth of wildlife from bin-raiding raccoons to a pair of celebrity red-tailed hawks who live on fashionable 5th Avenue.

=== Florida ===
18 January

Bill heads south to visit the Sunshine State where he paddles a kayak through 'gator filled swampland, befriends an armadillo at the roadside and dons flippers and snorkel to share a magical moment with a family of manatees.

=== New England ===
25 January

Bill travels up the Eastern Seaboard, starting in Massachusetts with a surprisingly close encounter with humpback whales, before heading north to Maine's great wilderness in search of the elusive and beguiling moose.

=== Nebraska ===
30 January

While crossing the Great Plains of Nebraska and South Dakota, Bill witnesses one of the great wildlife spectacles – millions of migrating cranes.

=== Vancouver ===
6 February

Bill Oddie continues his wildlife tour of North America with a visit to the stunning scenery of Vancouver Island, where he gets a spectacular view of a family of killer whales and gets remarkably close to one of the continent's largest terrestrial predators, the grizzly bear.

=== Arizona ===
13 February

Bill dons a stetson as his wildlife tour of North America rolls west to Arizona for a showdown with venomous desert animals – wily coyotes, speedy road runners and a garden full of enchanting hummingbirds.
