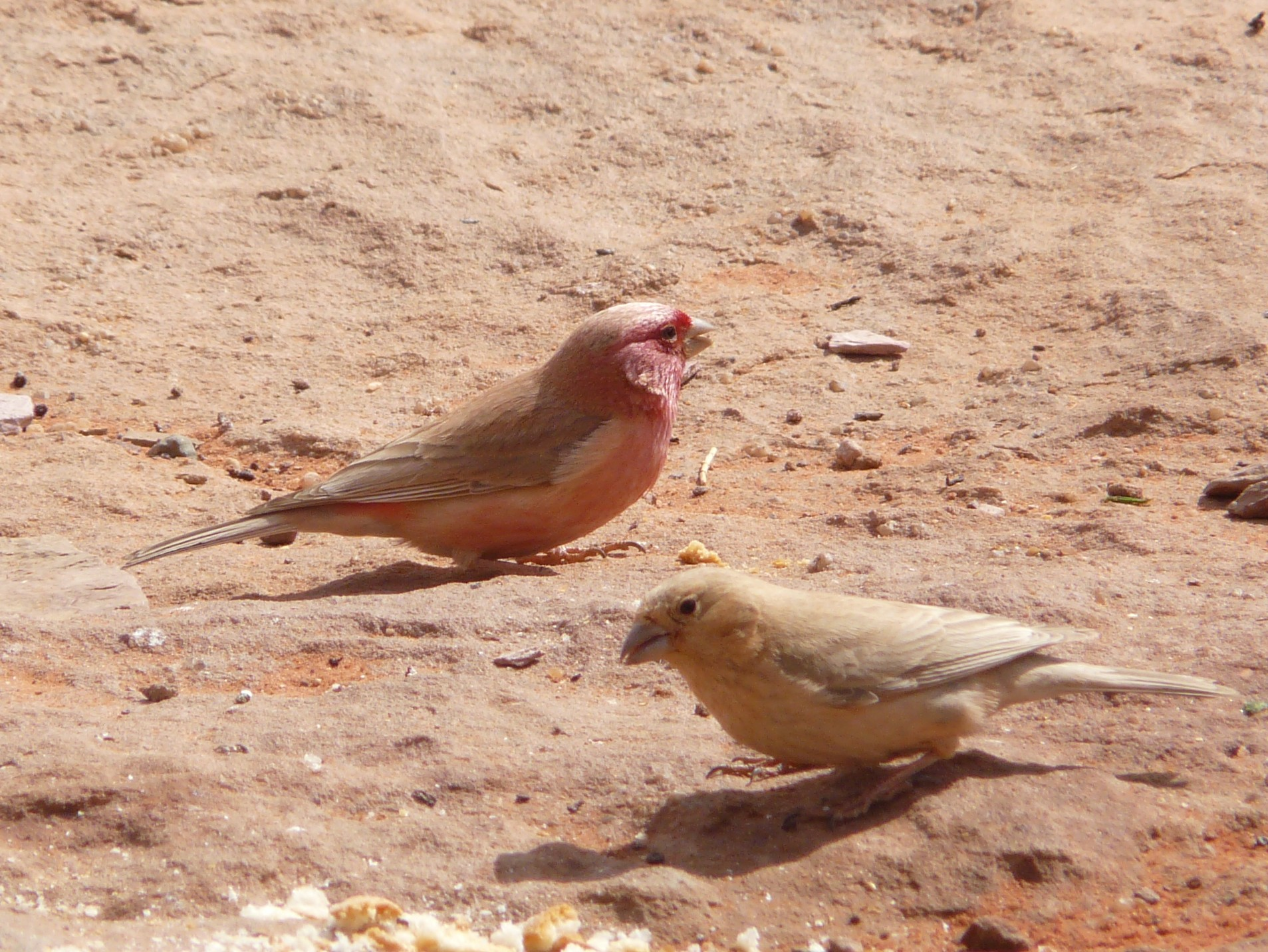
- A pair in Jordan

Conservation status
- Least Concern (IUCN 3.1)

Scientific classification
- Kingdom: Animalia
- Phylum: Chordata
- Class: Aves
- Order: Passeriformes
- Family: Fringillidae
- Subfamily: Carduelinae
- Genus: Carpodacus
- Species: C. synoicus

Binomial name
- Carpodacus synoicus (Temminck, 1825)
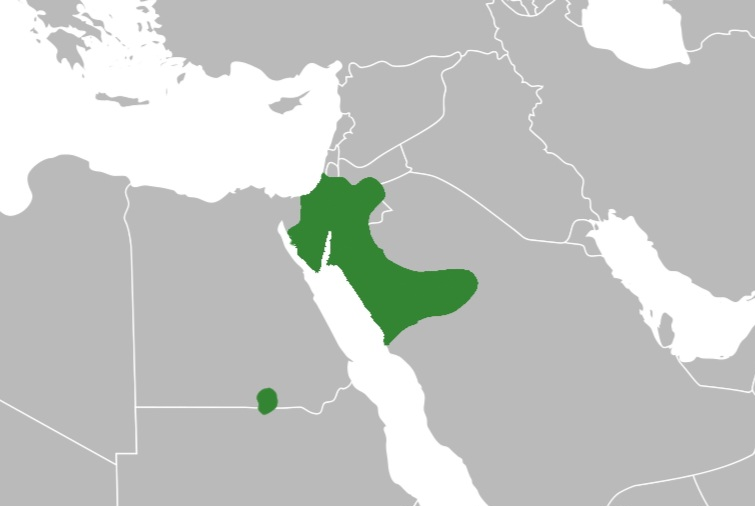
- Distribution map of the Sinai rosefinch

= Sinai rosefinch =

Species of bird

The Sinai rosefinch (Carpodacus synoicus) is a species of finch in the family Fringillidae. The male has a pink face and breast with a whitish forehead and crown and the female is pale gray-brown overall with a whitish belly. It is found in the Sinai Peninsula and the Negev region of the Middle East, within the borders of Egypt, Israel, Jordan, and Saudi Arabia. Its natural habitat is hot deserts. The pale rosefinch is sometimes considered a subspecies. It is the national bird of Jordan.

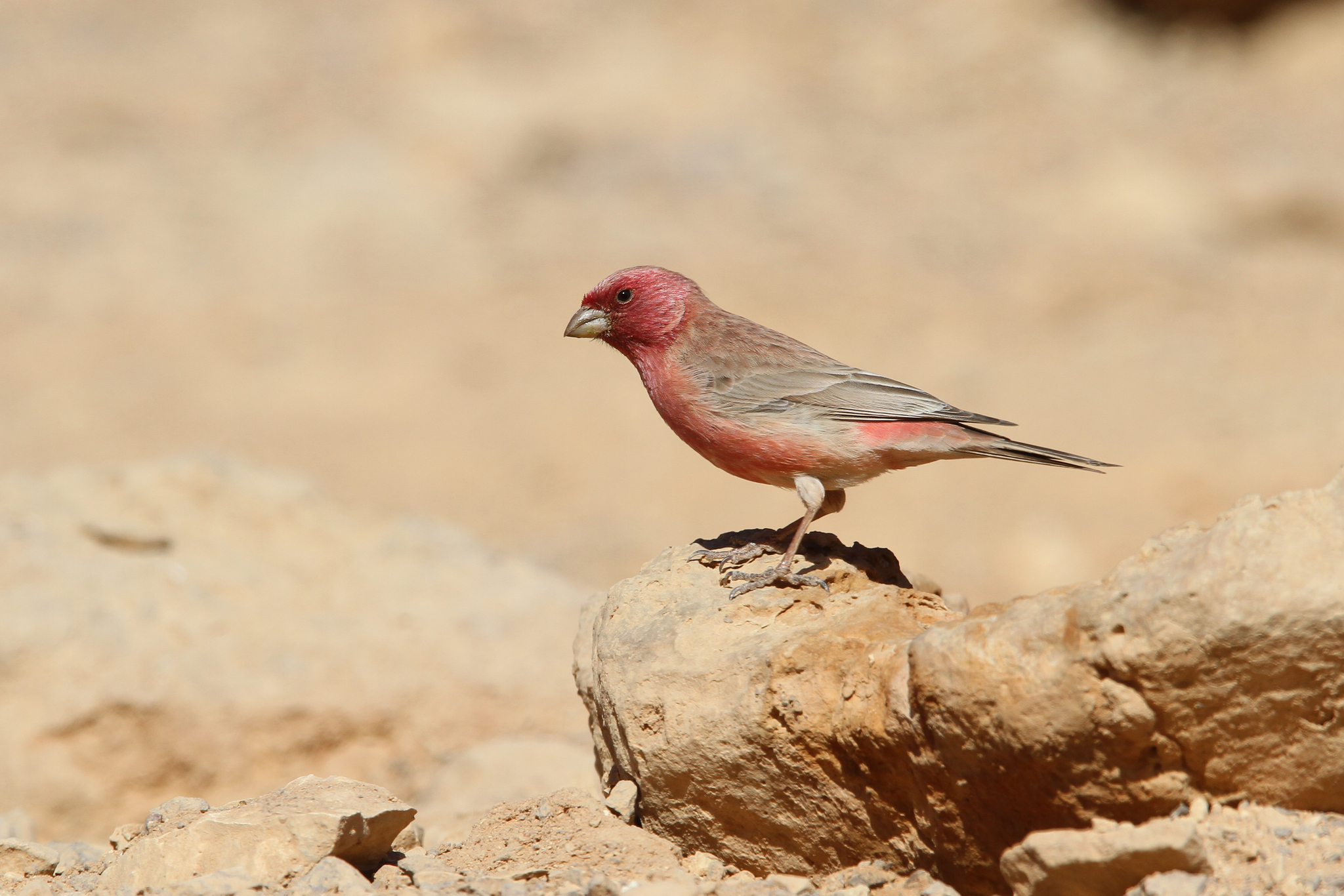
Sinai Rosefinch in Israel

== Jordan's national bird ==
The Sinai rosefinch was chosen as Jordan's national bird due to its similarity in color to the red sandstone on Petra.
