= Sharp-tailed sparrow =

Sharp-tailed sparrow can refer to either of two birds once thought to be a single species:

- Nelson's sparrow (Ammodramus nelsoni)
- Saltmarsh sparrow (Ammodramus caudacutus)
