= The Natural History and Antiquities of Selborne =

1789 book by Gilbert White

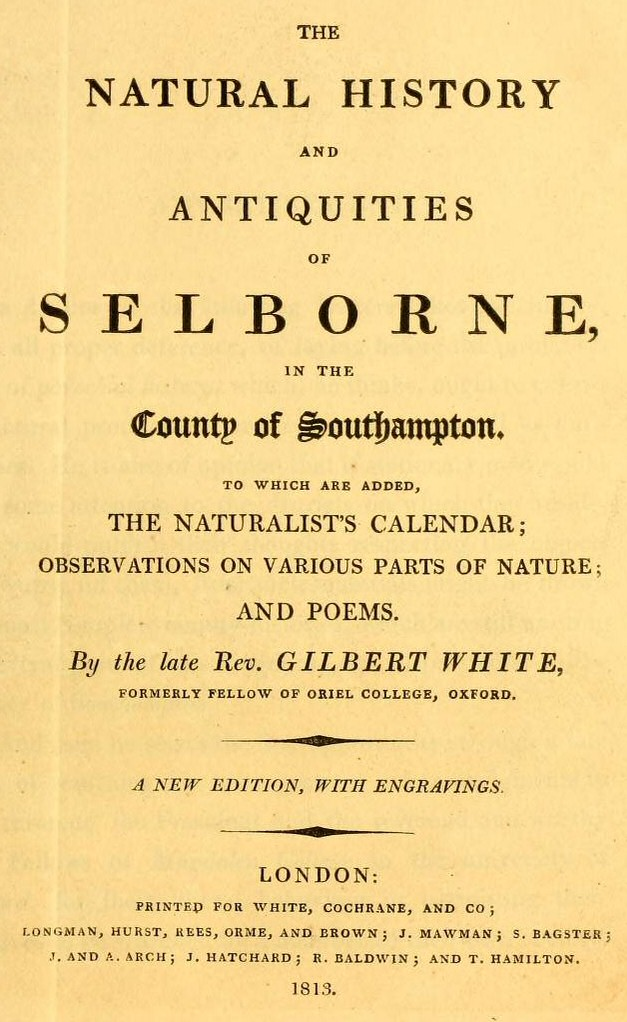
- Title page of 1813 edition
- Author: Gilbert White
- Genre: Natural history
- Publisher: Benjamin White
- Publication date: 1789
- Publication place: England
- Text: The Natural History and Antiquities of Selborne at Wikisource

The Natural History and Antiquities of Selborne, or just The Natural History of Selborne is a book by English parson-naturalist Gilbert White (1720–1793). It was first published in 1789 by his brother Benjamin. It has been continuously in print since then, with nearly 300 editions up to 2007.

The book was published late in White's life, compiled from a mixture of his letters to other naturalists—Thomas Pennant and Daines Barrington; a 'Naturalist's Calendar' (in the second edition) comparing phenological observations made by White and William Markwick of the first appearances in the year of different animals and plants in South East England, particularly in and around Selborne and Sussex; and observations of natural history organized more or less systematically by species and group. A second volume, less often reprinted, covered the antiquities of Selborne. Some of the letters were never posted and were written for the book.

White's Natural History was at once well received by contemporary critics and the public, and continued to be admired by a diverse range of nineteenth and twentieth century literary figures. His work has been seen as an early contribution to ecology and in particular to phenology. The book has been enjoyed for its charm and apparent simplicity, and the way that it creates a vision of pre-industrial England.

The original manuscript has been preserved and is displayed in the Gilbert White museum at The Wakes, Selborne.

== Overview ==
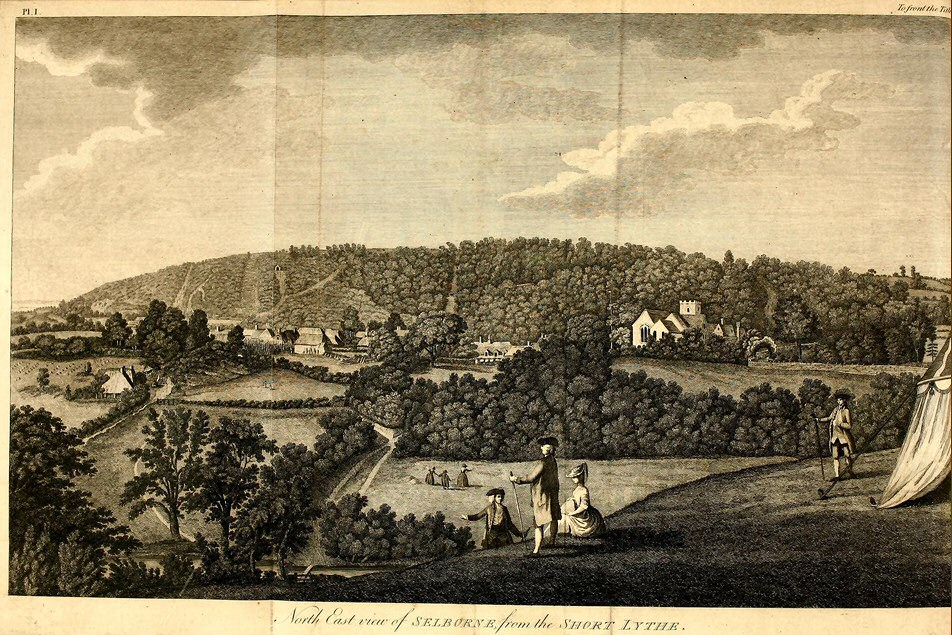
Foldout frontispiece, North East view of Selborne from the Short Lythe, drawn by Samuel Hieronymus Grimm

The main part of the book, the Natural History, is presented as a compilation of 44 letters nominally to Thomas Pennant, a leading British zoologist of the day, and 66 letters to Daines Barrington, an English barrister and Fellow of the Royal Society. In these letters, White details the natural history of the area around his family home at the vicarage of Selborne in Hampshire.

Many of the 'letters' were never posted, and were written especially for the book. Patrick Armstrong, in his book The English Parson-Naturalist, notes that in particular, "an obvious example is the first, nominally to Thomas Pennant, but which is clearly contrived, as it introduces the parish, briefly summarizing its position, geography and principal physical features." White's biographer, Richard Mabey, estimates that up to 46 out of 66 'letters to Daines Barrington' "were probably never sent through the post"; Mabey explains that it is hard to be more precise, because of White's extensive editing. Some letters are dated although never sent. Some dates have been altered. Some letters have been cut down, split into shorter 'letters', merged, or distributed in small parts into other letters. A section about insect-eating birds in a letter sent to Barrington in 1770 appears in the book as letter 41 to Pennant. Personal remarks have been removed throughout. Thus, while the book is genuinely based on letters to Pennant and Barrington, the structure of the book is a literary device.

As a compilation of letters and other materials, the book as a whole has an uneven structure. The first part is a diary-like sequence of 'letters', with the breaks and wanderings that naturally follow. The second is a calendar, organized by phenological event around the year. The third is a collection of observations, organised by animal or plant group and species, with a section on meteorology. The apparently rambling structure of the book is in fact bracketed by opening and closing sections, arranged like the rest as letters, which "give form and scale and even a semblance of narrative structure to what would otherwise have been a shapeless anthology."

The unposted Letter 1 begins:

The parish of Selborne lies in the extreme eastern corner of the county of Hampshire, bordering on the county of Sussex, and not far from the county of Surrey; is about fifty miles south-west of London, in latitude fifty-one, and near mid-way between the towns of Alton and Petersfield. Being very large and extensive, it abuts on twelve parishes, two of which are in Sussex—viz, Trotton and Rogate. ... The soils of this district are almost as various and diversified as the views and aspects. The high part of the south-west consists of a vast hill of chalk, rising three hundred feet above the village, and is divided into a sheep-down, the high wood and a long hanging wood, called The Hanger. The covert of this eminence is altogether beech, the most lovely of all forest trees, whether we consider its smooth rind or bark, its glossy foliage, or graceful pendulous boughs. The down, or sheepwalk, is a pleasing park-like spot, of about one mile by half that space, jutting out on the verge of the hill-country, where it begins to break down into the plains, and commanding a very engaging view, being an assemblage of hill, dale, wood-lands, heath, and water. The prospect is bounded to the south-east and east by the vast range of mountains called the Sussex Downs, by Guild-down near Guildford, and by the Downs round Dorking, and Ryegate in Surrey, to the north-east, which altogether, with the country beyond Alton and Farnham, form a noble and extensive outline.

"No novelist could have opened better", wrote Virginia Woolf; "Selborne is set solidly in the foreground."

== Illustrations ==
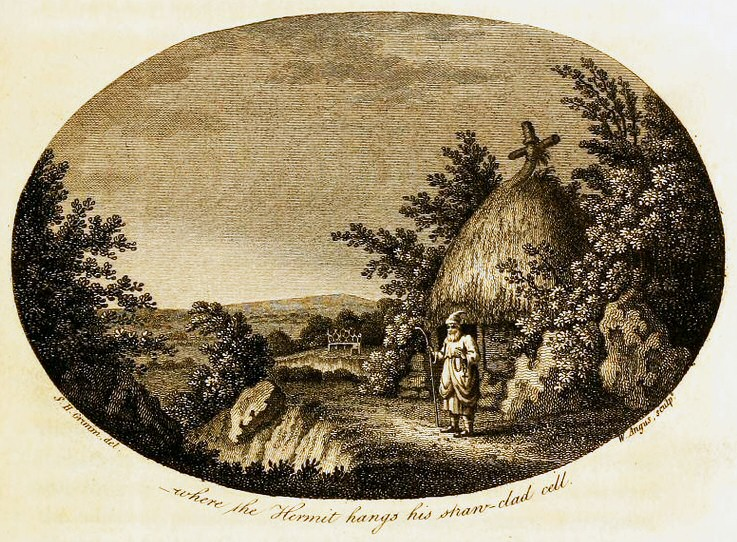
Half-title oval illustration where the hermit hangs his straw-clad cell in the 1813 edition of Gilbert White's Natural History of Selborne. Painting by Samuel Hieronymus Grimm; engraved by William Angus. The "hermit" was Henry White, dressed to look picturesque.

The first edition was illustrated with paintings by the Swiss artist Samuel Hieronymus Grimm, engraved by W. Angus and aquatinted. Grimm had lived in England since 1768, and was quite a famous artist, costing 2½ guineas per week. In the event, he stayed in Selborne for 28 days, and White recorded that he worked very hard on 24 of them. White also described Grimm's method, which was to sketch the landscape in lead pencil, then to put in the shading, and finally to add a light wash of watercolour. The illustrations were engraved (signed at lower right) by a variety of engravers including William Angus and Peter Mazell.

== Structure ==
=== The Natural History of Selborne ===
==== Letters to Thomas Pennant ====
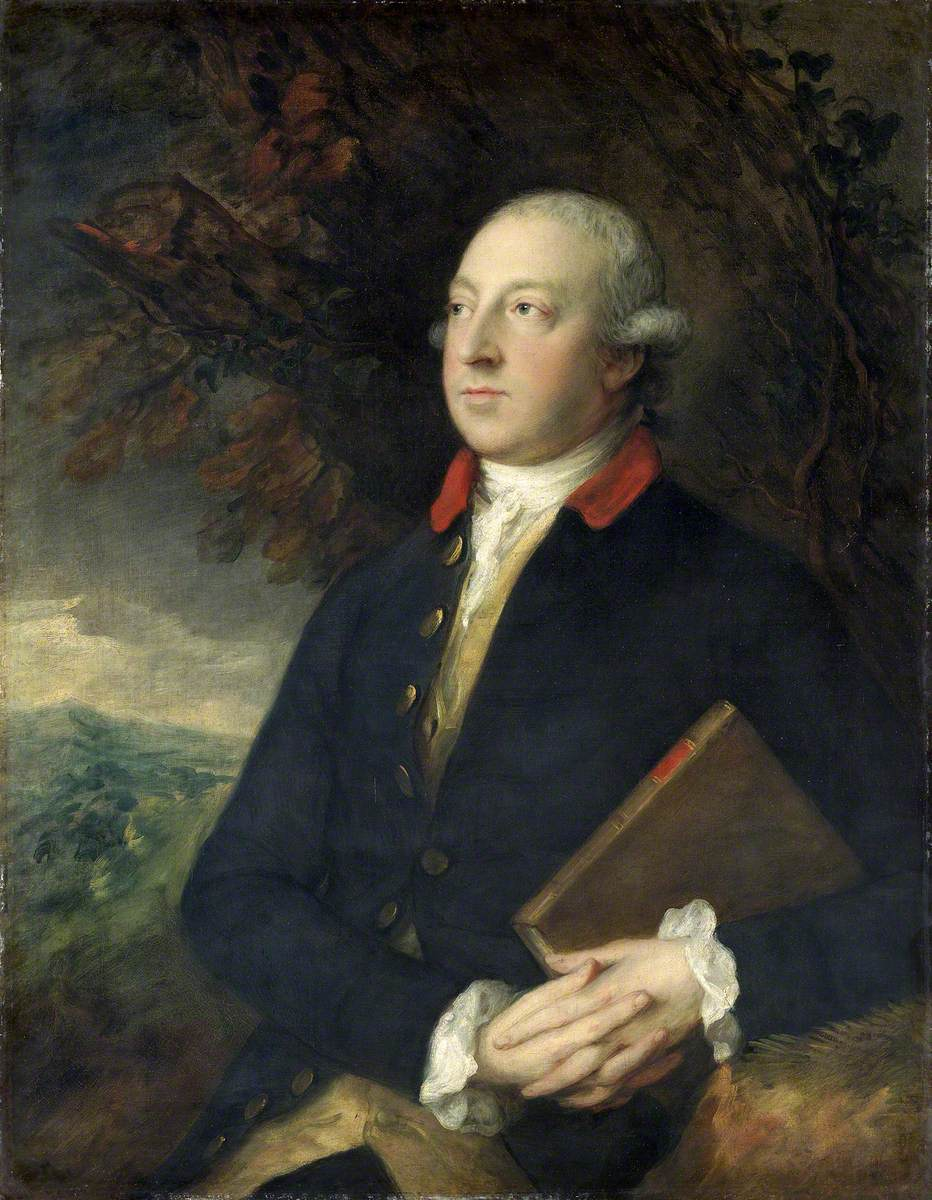
Correspondent: the Welsh author and naturalist Thomas Pennant

A little yellow bird (it is either a species of the Alauda trivialis, or rather perhaps of the Motacilla trochilus) still continues to make a sibilous shivering noise in the tops of tall woods. The stoparola of Ray (for which we have as yet no name in these parts) is called in your zoology the flycatcher. There is one circumstance characteristic of this bird which seems to have escaped observation, and that is, it takes its stand on the top of some stake or post, from whence it springs forth on its prey, catching a fly in the air, and hardly ever touching the ground, but returning still to the same stand for many times together.

— Gilbert White, The Natural History of Selborne. Letter 10 to Pennant

There are 44 letters to White's friend Thomas Pennant (1726–1798), of which the first nine were never posted and are thus undated. Of those that were posted, the first, Letter 10 giving an overview of Selborne, is dated 4 August 1767; the last, Letter 44 on wood pigeons, is dated 30 November 1780. It is not known how the men became friends, or even if they ever met; White writes repeatedly that he would like to meet "to have a little conversation face to face after we have corresponded so freely for several years" so it is certain they did not meet for long periods, and possible they never met at all. The letters are edited from the form in which they were actually posted; for example, Letter 10 as posted had a cringing introductory paragraph of thanks to Pennant which White edited out of the published version.

==== Letters to the Hon. Daines Barrington ====
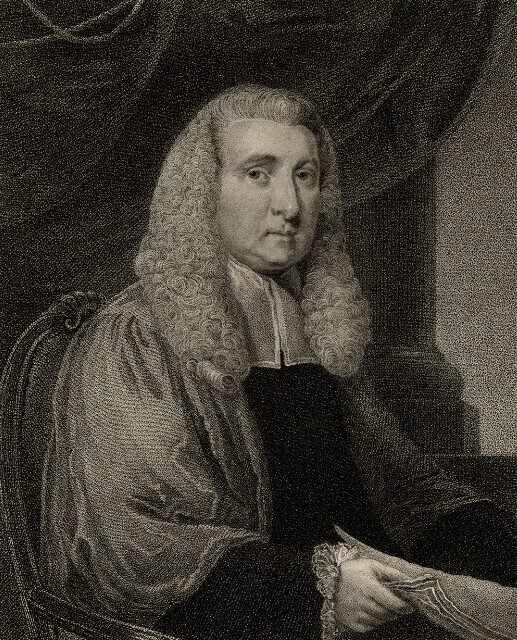
Correspondent: the English lawyer and naturalist Daines Barrington

There are 66 letters to the lawyer Daines Barrington (1727–1800), occupying half the book. Letter 1, on summer birds of passage, is dated 30 June 1769; Letter 66, on thunderstorms, is dated 25 June 1787. The Barrington letters therefore largely overlap the time frame of those to Pennant, but began and ended somewhat later. It was Barrington who suggested to White that he should write a book from his observations; although Pennant had been corresponding with White for a while, he was relying on White for natural history information for his own books, and, suggests White's biographer Richard Mabey, must have wanted White as a continuing source of information, not as a rival author. Barrington, on the other hand, liked to theorize about the natural world, but had little interest in making observations himself, and tended to accept claimed facts uncritically.

A character in some of the letters is a tortoise:

The old tortoise, that I have mentioned in a former letter, still continues in this garden, and retired underground about the 20th of November, and came out again for one day on the 30th : it lies now buried in a wet swampy border under a wall facing to the south, and is enveloped at present in mud and mire !

Letter 65 describes the summer of 1783 as:

an amazing and portentous one, and full of horrible phenomena; for, besides the alarming meteors and tremendous thunderstorms that affrighted and distressed the different counties of this kingdom, the peculiar haze, or smoky fog, that prevailed for many weeks in this island, and in every part of Europe, and even beyond its limits, was a most extraordinary appearance, unlike anything known within the memory of man ... The sun, at noon, looked as blank as a clouded moon, and shed a rust-coloured ferruginous light on the ground, and floors of rooms; but was particularly lurid and blood-coloured at rising and setting. All this time the heat was so intense that butcher's meat could hardly be eaten on the day after it was killed ...

This was caused by the eruption of the Laki volcano in Iceland between 8 June 1783 and February 1784, killing up to a quarter of the people of Iceland and spreading a haze as far as Egypt.

=== The Antiquities of Selborne ===
This section, often omitted from later editions, consists like the Natural History of 26 "Letters", none of them posted, and without even the fiction of being addressed to Pennant or Barrington.

Letter 1 begins "It is reasonable to suppose that in remote ages this woody and mountainous district was inhabited only by bears and wolves." Letter 2 discusses Selborne in Saxon times; Selborne was according to White a royal manor, belonging to Editha, queen to Edward the Confessor. Letter 3 describes the village's church, which "has no pretensions to antiquity, and is, as I suppose, of no earlier date than the beginning of the reign of Henry VII." Letter 5 describes the ancient Yew tree in the churchyard. Letter 7 describes the (ruined) priory. Letter 11 discusses the properties of the Knights Templar in and near the village.

Letter 14 describes the visit of bishop William of Wykeham in 1373, to correct the scandalous "particular abuses" in the religious houses in the parish. He orders the canons of Selborne priory (Item 5th) "to take care that the doors of their church and priory be so attended to that no suspected and disorderly females, suspectae at aliae inhonestae, pass through their choir and cloiser in the dark"; (Item 10th) to cease "living dissolutely after the flesh, and not after the spirit" as it has been proven that some of the canons "sleep naked in their beds without their breeches and shirts"; (Item 11th) to stop "keeping hounds, and publicly attending hunting-matches" and "noisy tumultuous huntings"; (Item 17th) to properly maintain their houses and the convent itself, since they have allowed "through neglect, notorious dilapidations to take place"; (Item 29th) to stop wearing "foppish ornaments, and the affectation of appearing like beaux with garments edged with costly furs, with fringed gloves, and silken girdles trimmed with gold and silver." Richard Mabey describes White's reaction to the "Priory saga" as "grave disapproval of the monks' sensuality and ... general delinquency".

A sequence of Letters then relate the history of the priors of Selborne, until Letter 24 which relates the takeover of the priory by Magdalen College, Oxford under bishop William Waynflete in 1459. White describes this as a disastrous fall: "Thus fell the considerable and well-endowed priory of Selborne after it had subsisted about two hundred and fifty-four years; about seventy-four years after the suppression of priories alien by Henry V., and about fifty years before the general dissolution of the monasteries by Henry VIII." The final letter records that "No sooner did the priory .. become an appendage to the college, but it must at once have tended to swift decay." White notes that since then, even "the very foundations have been torn up for the repair of the highways" so that nothing is left but a rough pasture "full of hillocks and pits, choaked with nettles, and dwarf-elder, and trampled by the feet of the ox and the heifer". White had reason to be bitter about the takeover by Magdalen College, as it had made them Lords of the Manor of Selborne, which in turn gave them the right to appoint the parish priest. White's biographer Richard Mabey casts doubt on the "frequent assumption" that White's "deepest regret was that he could never be vicar of Selborne", but it was true that he was ineligible, as only fellows of Magdalen could be granted the living.

=== A Naturalist's Calendar ===
==== From the year 1768 to the year 1793 ====
This section, compiled posthumously, contains a list of some 500 phenological observations in Selborne from White's manuscripts, organised by William Markwick (1739–1812), and supplemented by Markwick's own observations from Catsfield, near Battle, Sussex. The observations depend on the latitude of these places and on the (global) climate, forming a baseline for comparison with modern observations. For example, "Cuckoo (Cuculus canorus) heard" is recorded by White for 7—26 April, and by Markwick for 15 April and 3 May (presumably only once at the earlier date) and "last heard" by Markwick on 28 June.

The table begins as follows:

Of the abbreviations used, fl. signifies flowering; 1. leafing; and ap. the first appearance.
[Entry]	White	Markwick
Redbreast (Sylvia rubecula) sings	1–12 Jan.	3–31 Jan., and again 6 Oct
Larks (Alauda arvensis) congregate	1–18 Jan.	16 Oct, 9 Feb
Nuthatch (Sitta europaea) heard	1–14 Jan.	3 March, 10 April
Winter aconite (Helleborus hiemalis) fl.	1 Jan, 18 Feb	28 Feb, 17 April
...	...	...

==== Observations in Various Branches of Natural History ====
Sphynx oellata.
A vast insect appears after it is dusk, flying with a humming noise, and inserting its tongue into the bloom of the honey-suckle; it scarcely settles upon the plants, but feeds on the wing in the manner of humming birds.

— Gilbert White, The Natural History of Selborne. Observations on Insects.

Observations on Birds
This is the longest section of the observations, with comments in each instance by Markwick.
Observations on Quadrupeds
These are a few entries on sheep, rabbits, cats and squirrels, horse and hounds.
Observations on Insects and Vermes
The 'Vermes' cover glow-worms, earthworms, snails and slugs, and a "snake's slough", a cast skin.
Observations on Vegetables
The observations relate to trees, seeds, "beans sown by birds", "cucumbers set by bees", and a few fungi (truffles, Tremella nostoc, and fairy rings).
Meteorological Observations
These are a few curiosities such as frozen sleet and the "black spring" of 1771. He also recorded the effects on the weather of the 1783 volcanic eruption of the Icelandic crater Laki.

== Reception ==
=== Contemporary ===
White's lifelong friend John Mulso wrote to him in 1776, correctly predicting that "Your work, upon the whole, will immortalize your Place of Abode as well as Yourself."

Thomas White wrote "a long, appreciative, but.. properly restrained review" of his brother's book in The Gentleman's Magazine of January 1789, commenting that "Sagacity of observation runs through the work".

An anonymous reviewer in The Topographer of April 1789 wrote that "A more delightful, or more original work than Mr. White's History of Selborne has seldom been published ... Natural History has evidently been the author's principal study, and, of that, ornithology is evidently the favourite. The book is not a compilation from former publications, but the result of many years' attentive observations to nature itself, which are told not only with the precision of a philosopher, but with that happy selection of circumstances, which mark the poet."

=== Nineteenth century ===
In 1830, an anonymous critic, in what critic Tobias Menely called a description of Selborne "as a place that lingers beyond the spatio-temporal horizon of modern life", wrote having visited the village that:

[T]he sequestered retreat of the naturalist still remains ... inaccessible to all the improved knowledge and refinement which belong to these enlightened and virtuous times. It has been excluded from the blessings of increasing commerce and population, from factories and filiations, manufactures and Methodism, genius and gin, prosperity and pauperism.

The book was widely admired by contemporary writers. Samuel Taylor Coleridge called it a "sweet, delightful book"; John Clare imitated its style of natural history letters. Thomas Carlyle wrote that "It is one of our most excellent books; White, a quiet country Parson, has preached a better sermon here than all the loud Bishops that then were". Charles Darwin is said to have been delighted by it.

Circa 1862, the retired surgeon and zoologist Thomas Bell moved to The Wakes. He devoted his time to studying White's work, and editing new edition of the book.

=== Edwardian era ===
The 1907–1921 Cambridge History of English and American Literature begins its essay on White's Selborne with the words:

Gilbert White's Natural History and Antiquities of Selborne (1789) holds a unique position in English literature as the solitary classic of natural history. It is not easy to give, in a few words, a reason for its remarkable success. It is, in fact, not so much a logically arranged and systematic book as an invaluable record of the life work of a simple and refined man who succeeded in picturing himself as well as what he saw. The reader is carried along by his interest in the results of far-sighted observation; but, more than this, the reader imbibes the spirit of the writer which pervades the whole book and endears it to like-minded naturalists as a valued companion.

=== Modern ===
White is sometimes treated as a pioneer of ecology. The British ornithologist James Fisher gives a more balanced view, writing in 1941:

His world is round and simple and complete; the British country; the perfect escape.

The medical historian Richard Barnett writes that

White has the strange power to make natural historians of his readers, whether gardeners, historians or biologists", noting that this demands analysis. He observes further that "White is straight out of Jane Austen. If it were not for his fame as a naturalist and writer, nothing in his life would distinguish him from hundreds of country parsons in the 18th and 19th centuries. The Natural History of Selborne is an oddly unassuming masterpiece, its haphazard construction revealing the process by which White came to write it.

Barnett notes, too, that:

Part of White's appeal lies in this ability to summon a powerful, particular vision of pre-industrial England. He offers his readers the key to a walled garden of mellow Queen Anne brick, lying beside Thomas Gray's country churchyard and an ancient water meadow.

Yale nonfiction tutor Fred Strebeigh, writing in Audubon magazine in 1988, compared White with Henry Thoreau's Walden:

Out of the ruts and the ways of its village, Selborne fashioned a new natural history. It spoke simply, with a human voice. But it looked profoundly. It pioneered a way for students of nature who wished, as White did, not to roam the high Arctic or far Pacific but to fathom their own terrain. It offered a wide world to anyone willing to dig deep. Selborne said: watch narrowly, skim close to the ground. It whispered, hushed, what Thoreau would later broadcast: "We are acquainted with a mere pellicle of the globe on which we live. Most have not delved six feet beneath the surface, nor leaped as many above it. We know not where we are." In those words, as in all Walden, Thoreau may have had in mind the village of Selborne and the Reverend Gilbert White--the town reached only by ruts running well beneath the surface, the man whose book had leapt the ruts to round the globe.

Tobias Menely of Indiana University notes that the book "has garnered praise from Coleridge, Carlyle, Darwin, Ruskin, Woolf, and Auden" and that

Selborne's reception in the two hundred years since its initial publication offers a vivid instance of the retrospective idealization that transforms history into heritage.

The naturalist Richard Mabey writes in his biography of White that

I must confess that, like many others, I did not come painlessly to the Natural History. For years I was put off by the aura of sanctity and bluffness which seemed to surround it. It was the kind of book presented on prize-giving days, and I saw it as a work, in all senses, of the old school. Even when I eventually came to read it, I cannot say my opinion changed dramatically. I could not cope at first with its rambling disorder, its sudden plunges into thickets of taxonomic Latin, and, for a while, I failed to notice the feeling behind the often dispassionate prose.

Virginia Woolf liked the book enough to devote an essay in her The Captain’s Death Bed and Other Essays, "White's Selborne" to it, stating that the start of the book is like a novel.

== Manuscript ==
The manuscript for the book stayed in the White family until 1895, when it was auctioned at Sotheby's. The purchaser was Stuart M. Samuel, who mounted the letters and bound the book in green Morocco leather. His library was sold in 1907. The manuscript was bought by the dealer A.S.W. Rosenbach in 1923, and passed into the collection of Arthur A. Houghton. The Houghton collection was auctioned by Christie's in 1980, where the manuscript was purchased by and for "Gilbert White's House and Gardens" at The Wakes, Selborne, where it is displayed.

Since 2018 the complete manuscript is digitized and online available at the website of Gilbert White's House.

== Legacy ==
Thomas Bewick, in the first volume (Land Birds) of his A History of British Birds (1797), presents a phenological list of 19 birds which are "chiefly selected from Mr. White's Natural History of Selborne, and are arranged nearly in the order of their appearing". The list begins with the wryneck ("Middle of March"), places the cuckoo in the middle of April, and ends with the flycatcher in the middle of May.

Charles Darwin read the Natural History as a young man, inspiring him to take "much pleasure in watching the habits of birds" and to wonder "why every gentleman did not become an ornithologist". Sara Losh, too, read the Natural History as part of her "wonderful, varied and advanced [home] education for a young girl".

White's Natural History has been continuously in print since its first publication. It was long held ("apocryphally", according to White's biographer, Richard Mabey) to be the fourth-most published book in the English language after the Bible, the works of Shakespeare, and John Bunyan's The Pilgrim's Progress.

White's frequent accounts in The Natural History and Antiquities of Selborne of his tortoise Timothy, inherited from his aunt, form the basis for a variety of literary mentions. Verlyn Klinkenborg's book, Timothy; or, Notes of an Abject Reptile (2006) is based wholly on that reptile, as is Sylvia Townsend Warner's The Portrait of a Tortoise (1946). The tortoise also finds its way into science, as its species, Testudo whitei (Bennett 1836), long thought to be a synonym of Testudo graeca, has been rediscovered in Algeria.

Various writers have commented on the book. The poet Samuel Taylor Coleridge called it "This sweet delightful book". The novelist Virginia Woolf observed that "By some apparently unconscious device .. a door [is] left open, through which we hear distant sounds." Among poets, Edward Thomas wrote that "In this present year, 1915, at least, it is hard to find a flaw in the life he led" while W. H. Auden stated that "Selfishly, I, too, would have plumbed to know you: I could have learned so much." The naturalist and broadcaster David Attenborough called White "A man in total harmony with his world." The novelist Roald Dahl has the main character in his short story "The Visitor" read the book. The writer and zookeeper Gerald Durrell commented in The Amateur Naturalist that White "simply observed nature with a sharp eye and wrote about it lovingly."

== Sources ==
- Armstrong, Patrick (2000). The English Parson-Naturalist. Gracewing. ISBN 0-85244-516-4.
- Mabey, Richard (1986). Gilbert White: A biography of the author of The Natural History of Selborne. Century Hutchinson. ISBN 0-7126-1794-9.
