= Samuel Hieronymus Grimm =

Swiss landscape artist

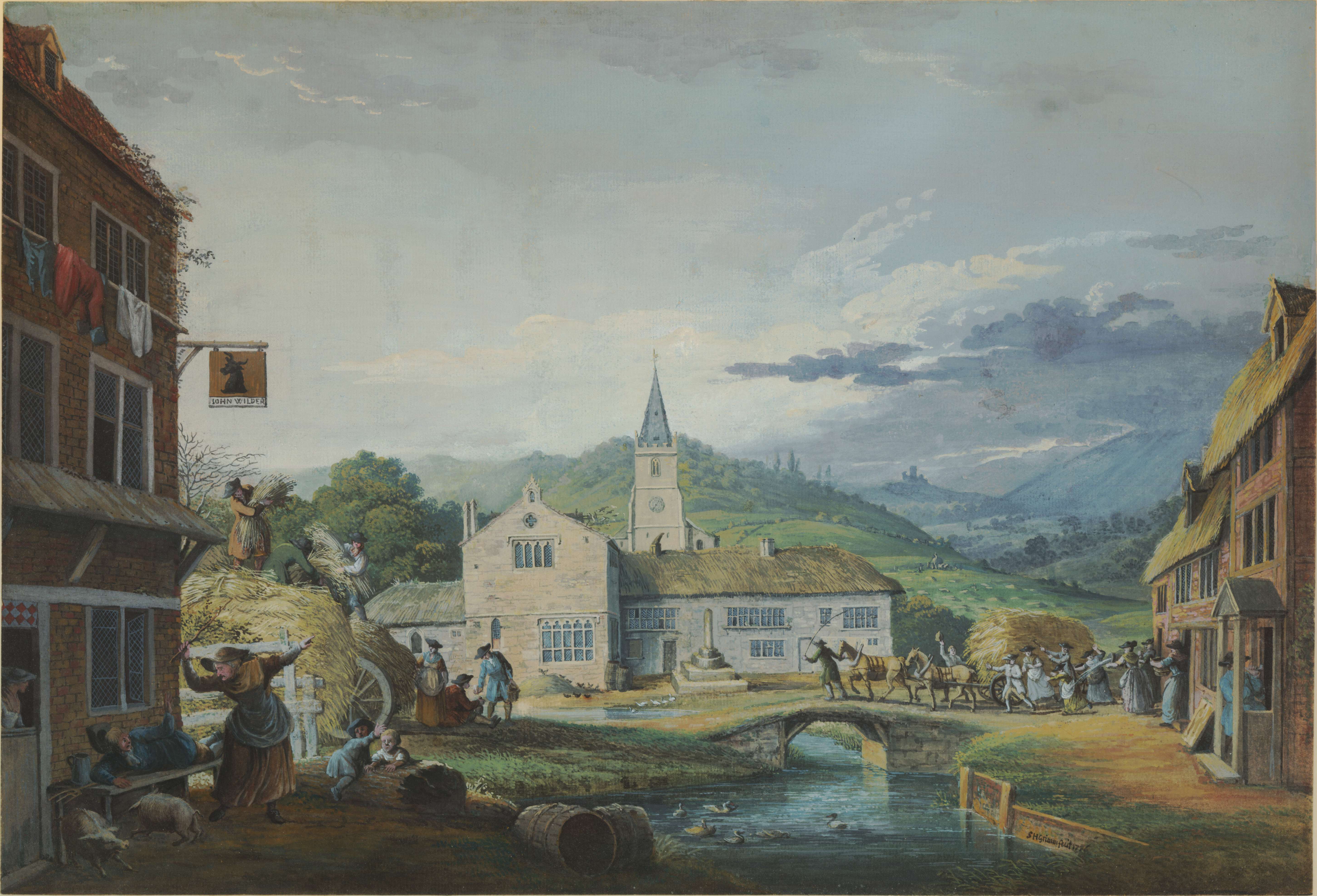
- An English Harvest Home by Samuel Hieronymus Grimm 1776
- Born: Samuel Hieronymus Grimm; 18 January 1733; Burgdorf, Switzerland.
- Died: 14 April 1794 (aged 61); Covent Garden, Westminster, Great Britain
- Education: Johann Ludwig Aberli and Johann Georg Wille
- Known for: Watercolours and wash drawings
- Patrons: Rev. Sir Richard Kaye, Henry Penruddocke Wyndham, Sir William Burrell

Samuel Hieronymus Grimm (18 January 1733 – 14 April 1794) was an 18th-century Swiss landscape artist who worked in oils (until 1764), watercolours, and pen and ink media.

Grimm specialised in documenting historical scenes and events; he also illustrated books such as Gilbert White's The Natural History and Antiquities of Selborne.

== Life and work ==
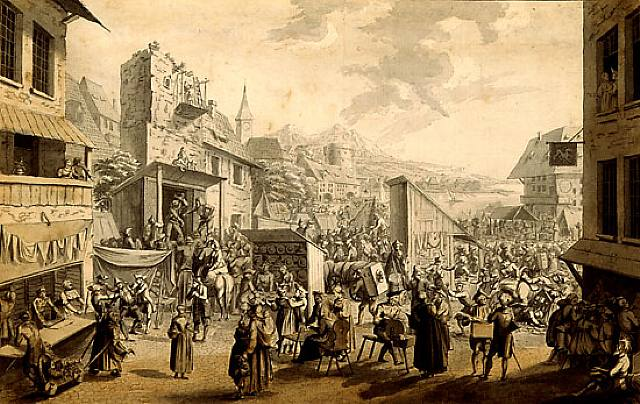
Country Fair in France, 1765

=== Early life and training in Bern and Paris ===
Grimm was born in 1733 in Burgdorf, a town situated to the north-east of Bern in Switzerland. Initially Grimm aspired to be a poet and in 1762 published a volume of poems. Shortly before 1760 Grimm moved to Bern and studied under Johann Ludwig Aberli who had taken over a drawing school that had previously been run by his uncle Johann Rudolf Grimm. Aberli specialised in topographical scenery, particularly of the Swiss Alps and he also patented a technique using faint outline etching for the mass production of these views. Grimm supplied drawings which were used to illustrate Friedrich von Hagedorn's Poetische Werke which was published between 1769 and 1772.

Grimm worked for Aberli until 1765, when at the age of 32, he moved to Paris to study under Johann Georg Wille who was a member of the Académie royal de peinture et de sculpture and Graveur de Roi. Under Wille, was able to greatly expand his skill as landscape and topographical artist. Surviving work shows that he made sketching trips in the Bois de Boulogne, Normandy and Picardy. At this time he perfected his skills as watercolour artist and a recorder of historic buildings. About March 1768, Grimm left Paris for London. Wille wrote about Grimm était un bien honnête garçon que nous estimions beaucoup.

=== Move to England ===
Critics of his time remarked that Grimm was a "man of genius". He was adopted as a travelling companion of the Rev. Sir Richard Kaye who became Rector of Kirkby in Ashfield in 1765 – his role was to record "anything curious". In 1775 Grimm was known to be in Derbyshire and Staffordshire, and by 1778 was working in London.

Grimm died in Tavistock Street in Westminster on 14 April 1794, and left his money to a niece in Switzerland. He was buried at St Paul's church, Covent Garden, in a funeral service taken by Kaye, who had become the Dean of Lincoln.

=== Role as a recording historian ===
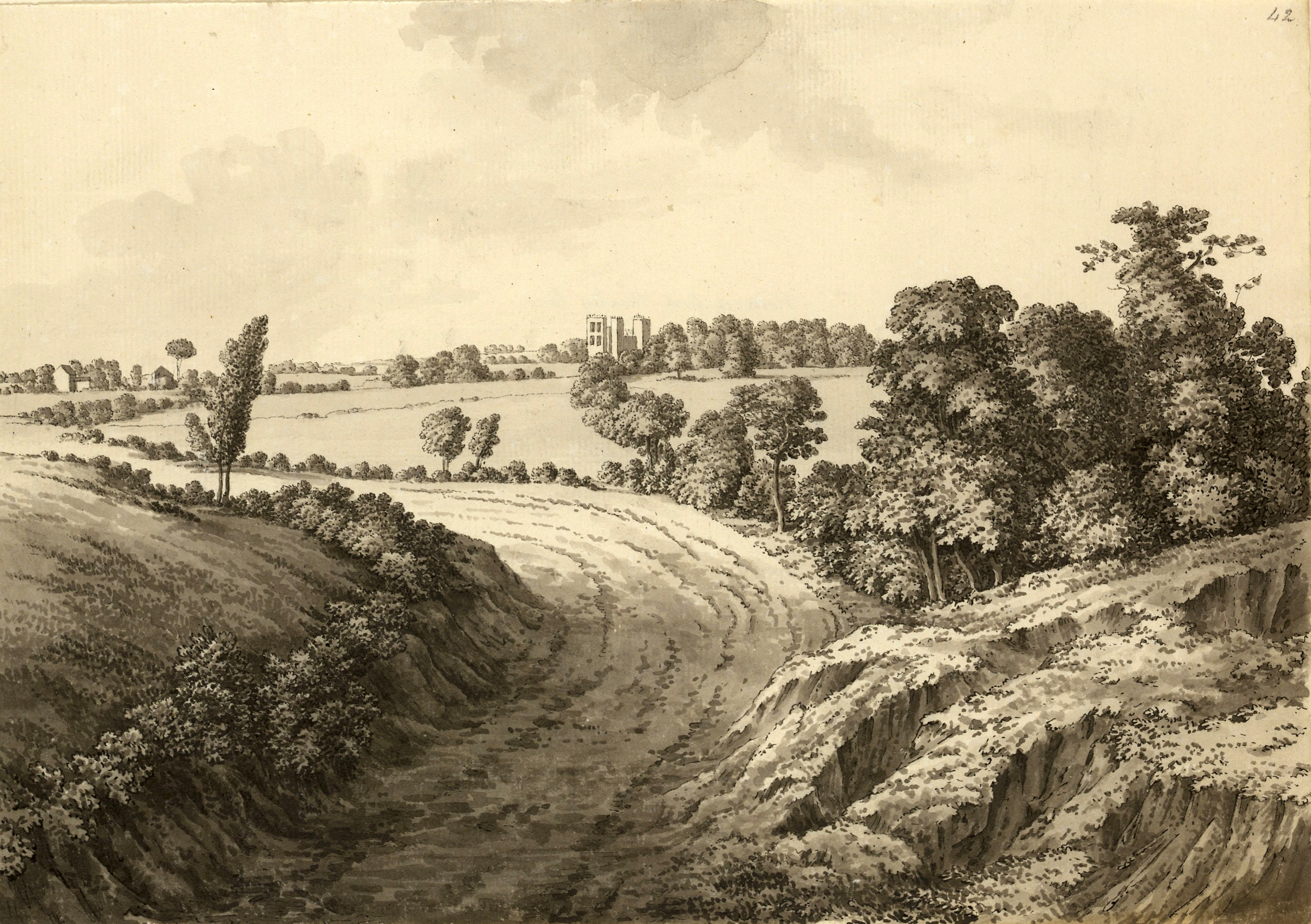
Hardwick Hall from Thakley Lane, 1773

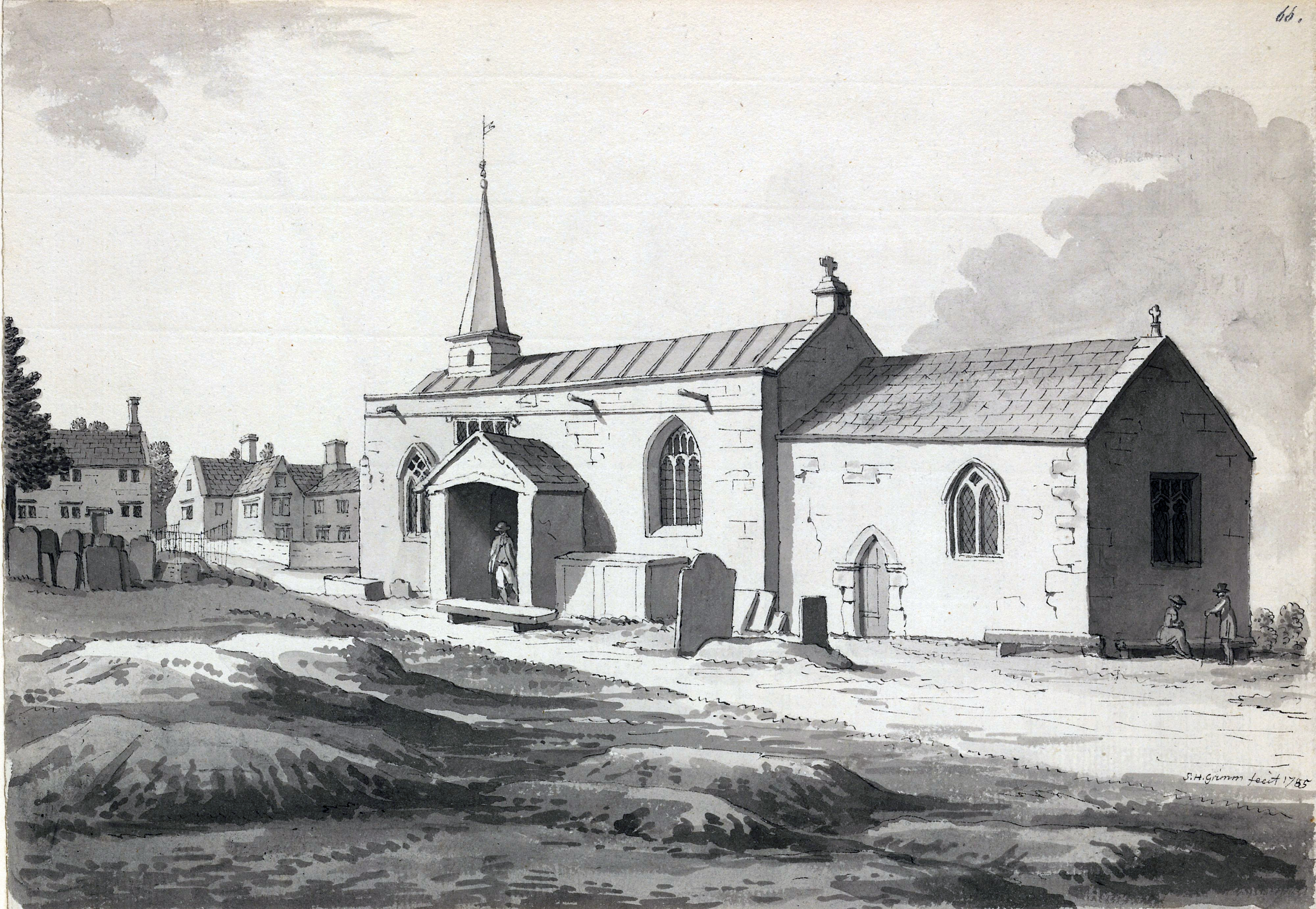
Old Whittington church, Derbyshire (1785). This was Samuel Pegge's church, later destroyed by a fire.

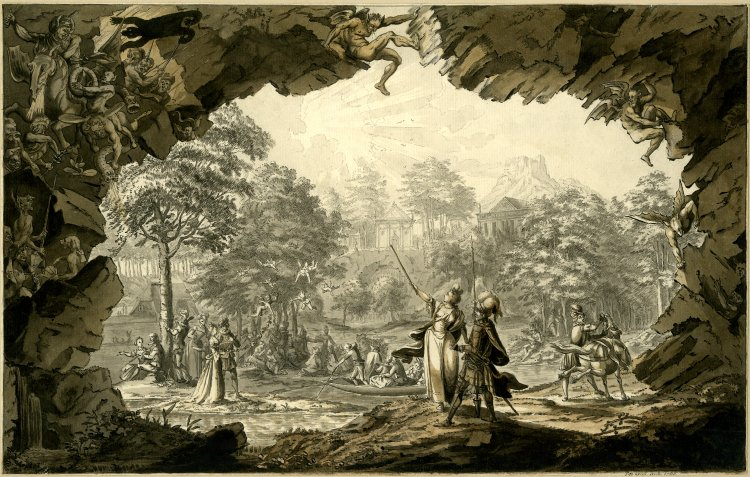
The Enchantress’s Cave, drawn by Grimm, 1765, possibly as a set design

Grimm's speciality was visually documenting historical relics in the kind of detail that might otherwise have gone unreported. For example, the British Library credits him with documenting the only surviving scene of the coronation of Edward VI. Another example of a unique artistic recording is the 1790 ink-wash drawing he produced of the chapel at Calcot Manor in Gloucestershire, long since ruined, and a drawing of Samuel Pegge's church which was later rebuilt after a fire. He also made a number of drawings of the body of Little Saint Hugh of Lincoln when his coffin was opened.

The British Library possesses 2,662 drawings in twelve volumes by this artist, covering many of the counties of England and a further 886 watercolours, in seven volumes, dedicated to the county of Sussex.

=== Patronage ===
Grimm's leading patron was Sir Richard Kaye, but this was not his only income. He also undertook work for the naturalist Gilbert White, illustrating his The Natural History and Antiquities of Selborne, and Sir William Burrell. Burrell gave Grimm's Sussex collection in 1796, whilst Sir Richard bequeathed his collection of Grimm's art to the British Museum in 1810. Luckily they valued his work more than Grimm himself, who had left instructions for his papers to be destroyed after his death.

== Exhibition ==
- Kunstmuseum Bern (17.01. – 21 April 2014) Samuel Hieronymus Grimm (1733–1794). A Very English Swiss, A Talented and much-admired Swiss in England.
