= William Markwick =

British naturalist (1739-1812)

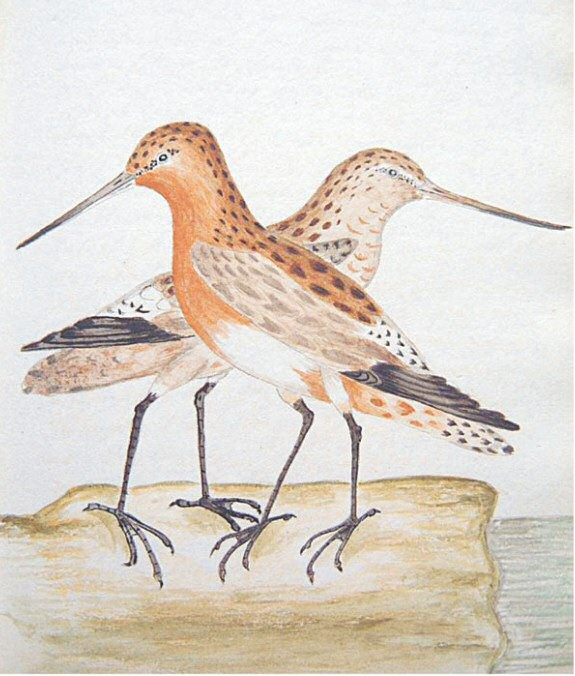
- Red godwit Scolopax lapponica by William Markwick
- Born: 1739; Catsfield, Sussex
- Died: 6 April 1812 (aged 72–73); Catsfield, Sussex
- Education: Peterhouse, Cambridge
- Known for: Phenology
- Spouse: Mary Date
- Scientific career
- Fields: Zoology, Botany

William Markwick (1739 – 6 April 1812), who took the name of William Eversfield, was a Fellow of the Linnean Society and a keen naturalist, known for his pioneering phenological observations recorded in Gilbert White's 1789 book The Natural History and Antiquities of Selborne.

Many of his scientific writings remain unpublished, in some cases despite being submitted to the Linnean Society.

== Life ==
William Markwick was the son of James Markwick of Catsfield and Mary Eversfield, who were married in Eastbourne on 10 June 1735.

He was nominally admitted to the Inner Temple to study law in May 1758, and equally nominally educated at Peterhouse, Cambridge in June 1758. However he neither practised as a lawyer nor took a Cambridge degree, choosing instead to live the life of an English country gentleman.

His estate covered 1600 acres of Sussex around Catsfield Place, also called Church House. He ordered short and delicate sheep's fescue grass seed to create an elegant greensward suitable for sheep, so that he could enjoy a view of sheep grazing outside his windows. Unfortunately, the story runs, the seed merchant supplied instead a much coarser grass, possibly giant fescue, (Note: There are several species of fescue found in Britain, including Festuca arundinacea, Festuca heterophylla and Festuca gigantea, which can grow over a metre tall. Sheep's fescue grows no more than 60 cm tall.) which grew so rank and tall that the sheep would not eat it, and it had to be controlled by scything.

On 30 June 1789, a few days after his fiftieth birthday, Markwick married Mary Date of Southampton (d. 1822) and they had four children:

- Mary (1791-1810), who died unmarried;
- Sophia (1792-1843), who married Edward Bligh in August 1820, bringing him a dowry of £10,000;
- Charles (1794-1818), who bought a commission as an officer in the 10th Hussars and died unmarried;
- James, who became High Sheriff of Sussex in 1822, three earlier Eversfields having held the same office.

Markwick's aunt Olive Eversfield, who died in 1803, directed in her will that for her inheritance he must take the surname Eversfield, which he did, though he continued to use the name Markwick on (for instance) his scientific papers. He thus acquired Denne Park near Horsham, which caused long legal complications and consumed some years of his time. After his death, his widow and later his son James lived at Denne, selling the Catsfield estate.

Markwick was made a Fellow of the Linnean Society in 1792. His land along the south coast of Sussex and the Pevensey Levels, with the time available to a gentleman of leisure, enabled him to observe wildlife in detail around the year, in particular wetland birds and marine animals including fish. He noted Buffon's objections to the value of the beaks of birds such as the crossbill, calling it "a deformity", and of the black skimmer ("an awkward and defective instrument"). Markwick correctly pointed out that these were "admirably well formed" for their specific purposes and rebukes Buffon for "finding fault with the works of the Creator". The European Magazine, and London Review of 1792 reported On the Migration of certain Birds, and on other Matters relating to the feathered Tribes. by William Markwick, Esq., Associate [of the Linnean Society] had been published:

These observations were made at Catsfield near Battle in Sussex. They are accompanied with a table, and explanatory remarks on a great number of birds; together with a figure of Tringa glareola, a rare bird shot in the parish of Battle.

— European Magazine

Markwick was one of two Justices of the Peace living in Catsfield in 1791.

== Phenology ==
Markwick is known for his useful and pioneering work in phenology, the study of when annual events happen in nature. (Note: Phenology has become increasingly important because of climate change.) Some 500 of his detailed observations are documented in the second edition of Gilbert White's 1789 book The Natural History and Antiquities of Selborne. It was praised as "a work of great exactness, and the result of as much, and as patient observation as perhaps was ever brought to the subject. It is formed upon an attentive comparison of the seasons, from 1768 to 1793." The "Comparative View of White's and Markwick's Calendars" begins as follows:

Of the abbreviations used, fl. signifies flowering; 1. leafing; and ap. the first appearance.
[Entry]	White	Markwick
Redbreast (Sylvia rubecula) sings	1–12 Jan.	3–31 Jan., and again 6 Oct
Larks (Alauda arvensis) congregate	1–18 Jan.	16 Oct, 9 Feb
Nuthatch (Sitta europaea) heard	1–14 Jan.	3 March, 10 April
Winter aconite (Helleborus hiemalis) fl.	1 Jan, 18 Feb	28 Feb, 17 April
...	...	...

== Works ==
- On the Migration of Certain Birds. Transactions Linnaean Society. Volume 1. 1791. With "Calendar" of phenology for 1768–1783.
- Calendar. Transactions Linnaean Society. Volume 4. 1798. For 1783–1794. These were used in White's Selborne.
- Fasciculus Plantarum Indigenarum, 1786–1808. Unpublished. 8 fascicles of 50 species each, Hastings.
- Centuria Plantarum Indigenarum, 1799-[1800?]. Unpublished. 2 volumes, Hastings. Describes 200 species.
- British Zoology, 1800. Unpublished MS, 4 volumes, Hastings.
- Descriptions and Figures of several Grasses and Rushes, 1800. Unpublished MS 491, Linnean Society. Describes 37 species.
- Plantae Sussexiensis, 1802. Unpublished MS 474, Linnean Society. Describes 558 species.
- Danish Plants Found in the British Isles, 1802. Crerar MS 139, University of Chicago Library.
- Florula Canadiensis, 1805. (A flora of Lower Canada: Nova Scotia, New Brunswick, Gaspé Peninsula)

=== Illustrations ===
Markwick provided the natural history illustrations for some of his works, both zoological and botanical.

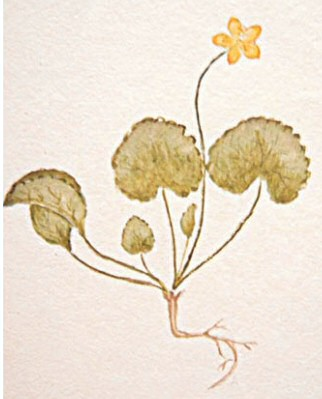
Moneywort-leaved St John's wort, Hypericum nummularium

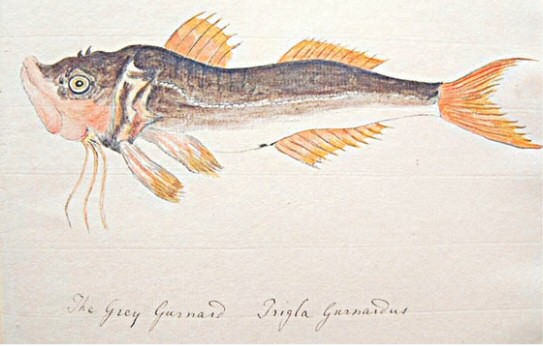
Grey Gurnard Trigla Gurnardus, 1805

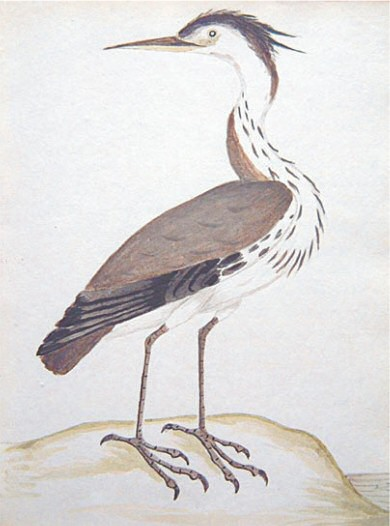
Heron Ardea cinerea
