= Aconite =

Aconite may refer to:

- Aconitum, a plant genus containing the monkshoods
- Aconitine, a toxin derived from some of the plants of genus Aconitum
- Winter aconite, a plant in the genus Eranthis
