= Verlyn Klinkenborg =

American writer

- Born: 1952 (age 73–74); Meeker, Colorado, U.S.

Academic background
- Education: Pomona College (BA); Princeton University (PhD)

Academic work
- Discipline: Creative Writing; English literature
- Institutions: Fordham University; St. Olaf College; Bennington College; Sarah Lawrence College; Bard College; Harvard University; Yale University

Verlyn Klinkenborg (born 1952 in Meeker, Colorado) is an American non-fiction author, academic, and former newspaper editor, known for his writings on rural America.

== Early life and education ==
Klinkenborg was born in Meeker, Colorado, and raised on a farm in Iowa. He attended elementary school in Clarion, Iowa, until the sixth grade before his family relocated to Osage, Iowa. His family then moved to Sacramento, California.

Klinkenborg attended the University of California, Berkeley before earning a Bachelor of Arts degree in English literature from Pomona College. He then earned a Ph.D. from Princeton University, also in English literature.

== Career ==
Klinkenborg taught literature and creative writing at Fordham University while living in The Bronx in the early to mid-1980s. He later taught at St. Olaf College, Bennington College, Sarah Lawrence College, Bard College, and Harvard University. In 1991, he received the Lila Wallace–Reader's Digest Writer's Award and a National Endowment for the Arts fellowship.

Klinkenborg's books include More Scenes from the Rural Life, Making Hay and The Last Fine Time.

His book Timothy; or, Notes of an Abject Reptile concerns the tortoise which the English eighteenth century parson-naturalist Gilbert White inherited from his aunt, as described in his 1789 book The Natural History and Antiquities of Selborne. In the first half of 2006, Klinkenborg posted a farm and garden blog about The Rural Life, consisting of entries from the daily journal kept by Gilbert White in Selborne in 1784, and his own complementary daily entries.

From 1997 to 2013, he was a member of the editorial board of The New York Times.

Klinkenborg has published articles in The New Yorker, The New York Review of Books, Harper's Magazine, Esquire, National Geographic and Mother Jones magazines.

He has written a series of editorial opinions in The New York Times; these are generally literary meditations on rural farm life. On December 26, 2013, he announced in that column that it was to be the last he would be writing in that space.

From 2006 to 2007, he was a visiting writer-in-residence at Pomona College, where he taught nonfiction writing. In 2007, he received a Guggenheim fellowship, which funded his book The Mermaids of Lapland, about William Cobbett. In 2012, he published “Several Short Sentences About Writing”.

He currently teaches creative writing at Yale University and lives on a small farm in upstate New York.

== Bibliography ==
=== Books ===
- The Rural Life
- More Scenes from the Rural Life (Princeton Architectural Press)
- Making Hay
- The Last Fine Time
- Timothy; or, Notes of an Abject Reptile
- Several Short Sentences About Writing

=== Book reviews ===
Year	Review article	Work(s) reviewed
2018	Klinkenborg, Verlyn (February 22, 2018). "A horse is a horse, of course". The New York Review of Books. 65 (3): 46–47.	Raulff, Ulrich. Farewell to the horse : a cultural history. Translated by Ruth Ahmedzai Kemp. Liveright.
2019	Klinkenborg, Verlyn (December 19, 2019). "What Were Dinosaurs For". The New York Review of Books. 66 (20): 34–38.	Five books on dinosaurs.
2020	Klinkenborg, Verlyn (December 17, 2020). "A Noah's Ark of Books". The New York Review of Books. 67 (20).	Selected books in the Reaktion Animal series.
2021	Klinkenborg, Verlyn (August 19, 2021). "Requiem for a Heavyweight". The New York Review of Books. 68 (13).	Giggs, Rebecca. Fathoms: The World in the Whale. Simon and Schuster.
2022	Klinkenborg, Verlyn (July 23, 2022). "The Forest's-Eye View". The New York Review of Books. 69 (12).	Reid, John W.; Lovejoy, Thomas E. Ever Green: Saving Big Forests to Save the Planet. Norton. Rawlence, Ben. The Treeline: The Last Forest and the Future of Life on Earth. St Martin's.
2022	Klinkenborg, Verlyn (December 19, 2022). "Endless Summer". The New York Review of Books. 69 (15).	Wilson, Brent (director). Brian Wilson: Long Promised Road (Documentary film). PBS American Masters.
2023	Klinkenborg, Verlyn (March 23, 2023). "Trees in Themselves". The New York Review of Books. 70 (5).	Farmer, Jared. Elderflora: A Modern History of Ancient Trees. Basic Books.

Bloggs, Joe; Bloggs, Fred (1974). Book of Bloggs.
