= Benjamin White (publisher) =

English Publisher (c. 1725 - 1794)

- Born: c. 1725
- Died: March 9, 1794; Bentley, Hampshire
- Occupation: Bookseller
- Spouse: Anne Yalden
- Relatives: brother of Gilbert White

Benjamin White or Ben White (c. 1725 – March 9, 1794) was a successful Fleet Street publisher. He was the first publisher to specialise in books on Natural History including The Natural History of Selborne which was written by his brother, Gilbert White.

== Life ==
Benjamin White was the third surviving son of John White (1688 - 1758), a barrister, and his wife Anne (born Holt). The White family lived at The Wakes the family home in Selborne which was to become a memorial to the White family. Ben attended school at Bishop's Waltham and he went to London to join the publishing business. He joined the publishing house led by John Whiston and he was a partner by 1756 and he led the firm by 1765.

Benjamin White became the richest member of his family, but he is mainly remembered for introducing his older brother Gilbert White to the barrister Daines Barrington and the naturalist Thomas Pennant, their correspondence about the natural history of Selborne leading ultimately to Gilbert White's much admired The Natural History of Selborne. White published a number of Pennant's books, including his British Zoology (1776–7).

The family connection was extended by Benjamin's brother John. John was chaplain to the garrison in Gibraltar and it is said that Gilbert's seventeen year encouragement of his brother John to document the natural history of the southern tip of Iberia led to Gilbert's decision to document Selborne's natural history. John had sent many specimens back to England for Gilbert to study. John was to prepare a book for publication when he returned to England but his brother Ben, and Gilbert who was also consulted, agreed to reject, Fauna Calpensis. This is now a lost book.

The publishing firm at the corner of Fleet Street and The Strand was known as Horace's Head. It was the first to specialise in books on natural history and his publishing house became a meeting place for naturalists such as Thomas Pennant, who had many editions of his books published by White. He also published books on Mollusc shells by Emanuel Mendes da Costa. White issued sale catalogues on a regular basis, as did many of his contemporaries, and many of these may now be viewed online.

White's son, also Benjamin, joined the firm and he was involved in publishing Gilbert's Selborne. White died in Bentley, Hampshire having been a successful Fleet Street publisher. He never knew of the success of his brother Gilbert's book, as this started 30 years after his death when Natural History became fashionable. The White family home in Selborne, The Wakes, is preserved as a museum.
