= The Last Fine Time =

- Author: Verlyn Klinkenborg
- Language: English
- Genre: Non-fiction
- Publisher: Knopf
- Publication date: 1991
- Publication place: United States
- Pages: 209 pp

The Last Fine Time is a 1991 book by American author Verlyn Klinkenborg about a blue collar Polish-American bar in Buffalo, New York, inherited by his father-in-law in 1947. The story of George & Eddie's, which became a popular nightspot, is the story not only of a family business during a rapidly changing historical period, but of the city of Buffalo in its multi-ethnic heyday. Portions of the book appeared originally in The New Yorker.
