= William Angus (engraver) =

English engraver

William Angus (c. 1752 – 12 October 1821) was an English engraver of copper plates for prints and book illustrations.

== Life and work ==
William Angus was born in 1752. He became a master engraver. Among his pupils was the engraver William Bernard Cooke (1778–1855).

He died in Islington, Middlesex on 12 October 1821; probate was granted on his will on 15 March 1822.

== Works ==
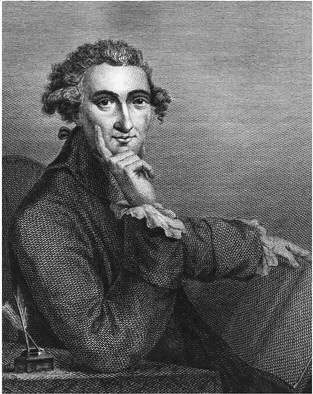
Engraving of Thomas Paine, 1791.

- Brough Hall, seat of Sir John Lawson
- Castle Howard
- Cusworth, seat of William Wrightson
- Sand Beck, seat of the Earl of Scarborough
- Thomas Paine, 1791
- Newnham Court in Oxfordshire, the Seat of Earl Harecourt, 1795
