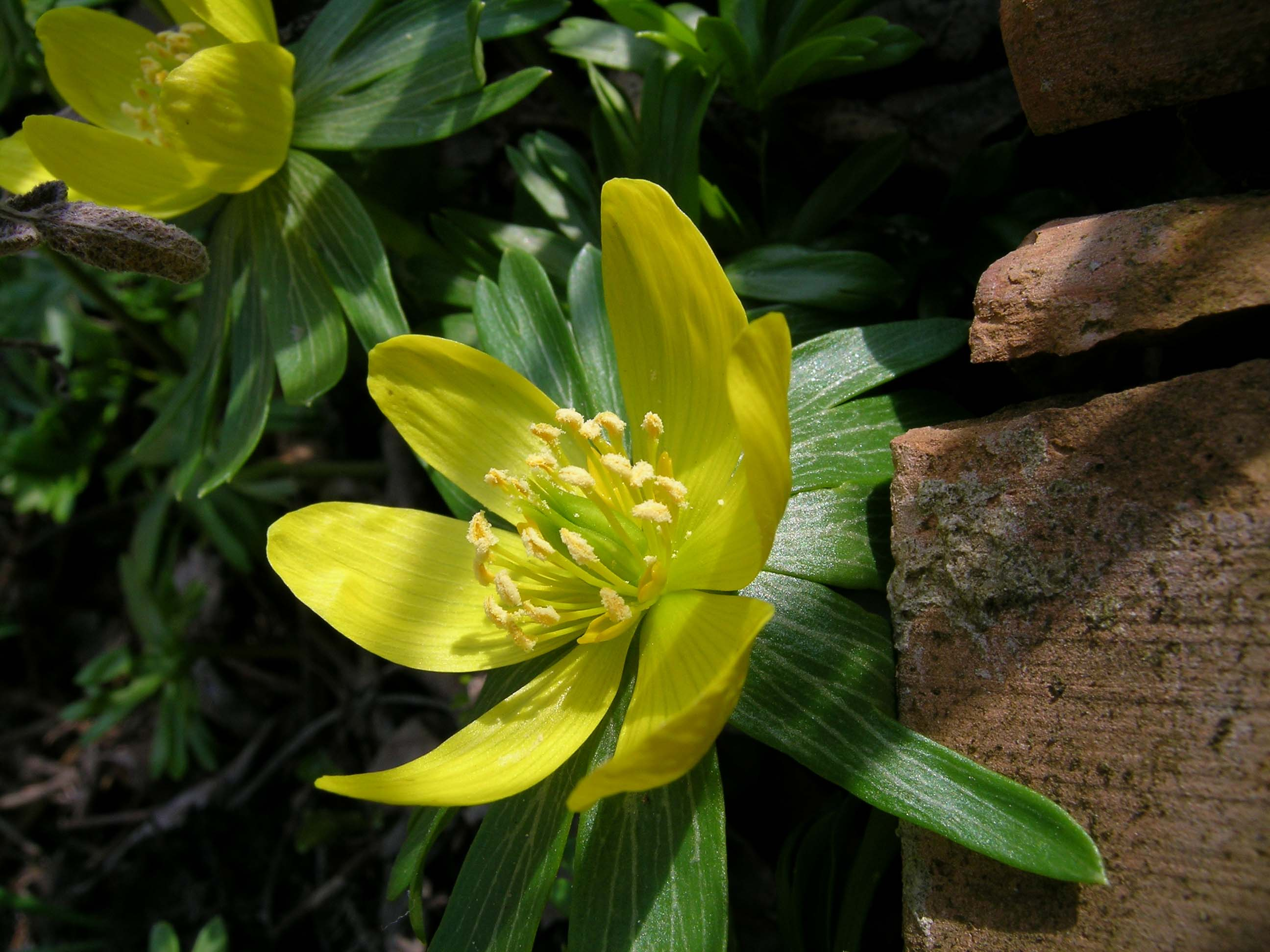
- Eranthis hyemalis

Scientific classification
- Kingdom: Plantae
- Clade: Embryophytes
- Clade: Tracheophytes
- Clade: Spermatophytes
- Clade: Angiosperms
- Clade: Eudicots
- Order: Ranunculales
- Family: Ranunculaceae
- Subfamily: Ranunculoideae
- Tribe: Cimicifugeae
- Genus: Eranthis; Salisb.

Species
- See text

= Eranthis =

Genus of flowering plants

Eranthis is a genus of eight species of flowering plants in the buttercup family Ranunculaceae, native to southern Europe and east across Asia to Japan. The common name winter aconite comes from the early flowering time and the resemblance of the leaves to those of the related genus Aconitum, the true aconite. Like the notoriously toxic Aconitum (and, indeed, many other genera of the Ranunculaceae) Eranthis is poisonous, although the toxins are different, being mainly cardiac glycosides similar to those found in various other plant species such as Adonis vernalis or Asclepias incarnata, rather than the neurotoxic alkaloids of Aconitum.

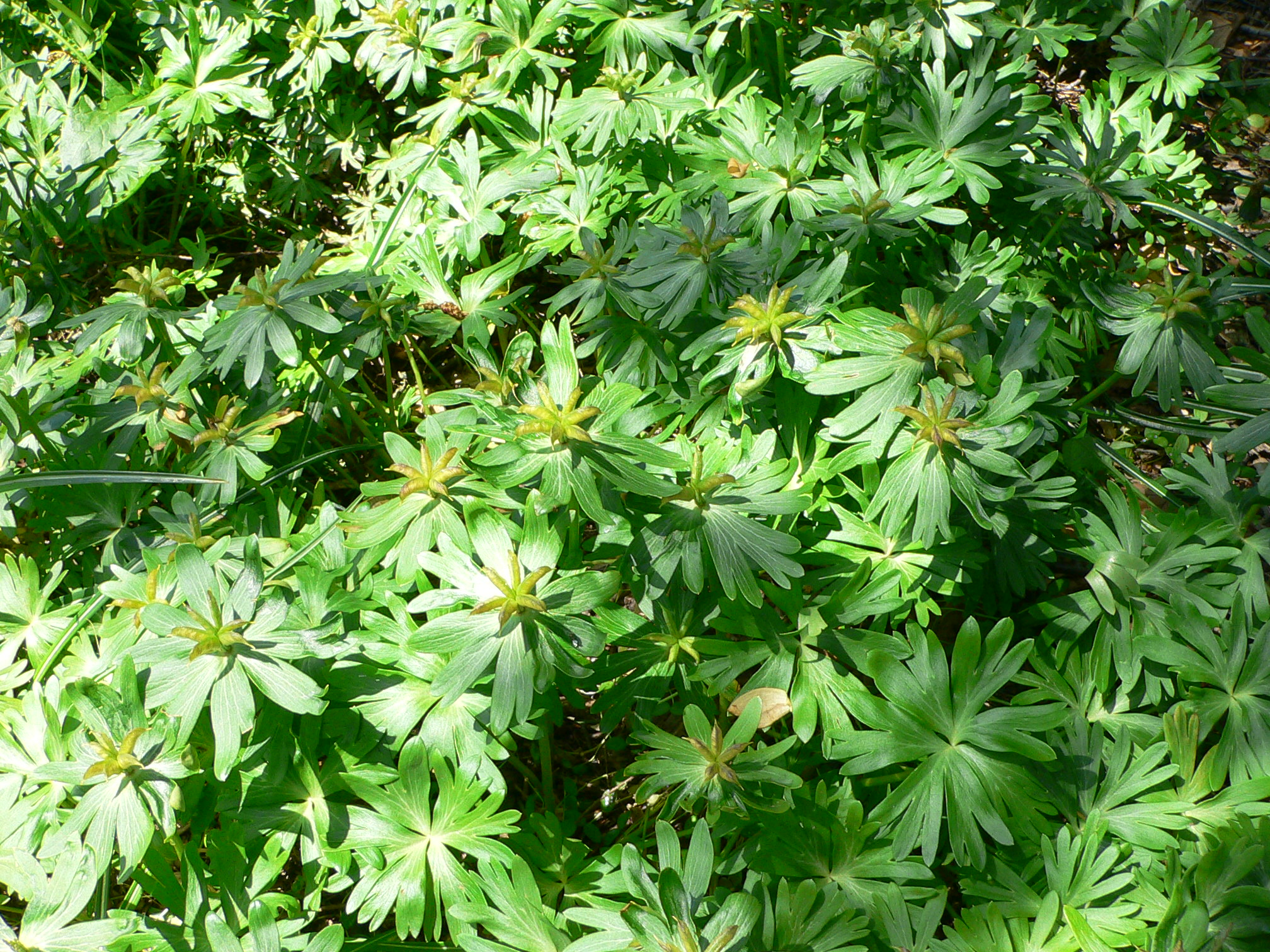
Foliage at the end of flowering

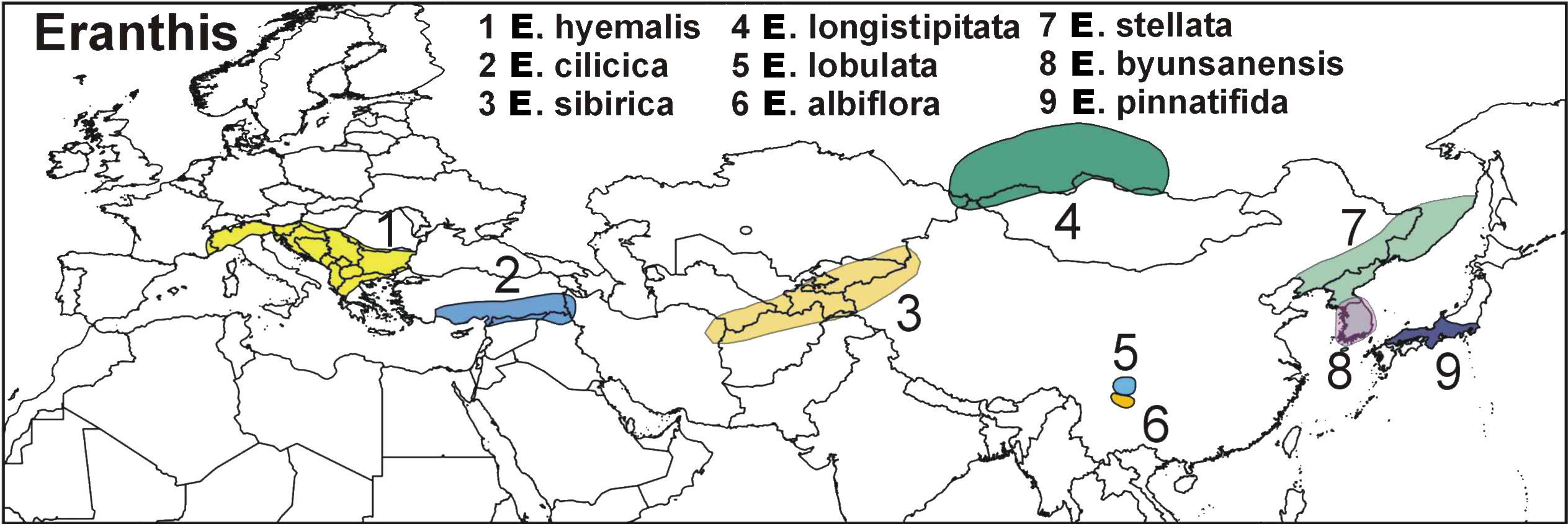
Distribution map of eight or nine species of Eranthis in Europe and Asia. (Presentation based on natural distribution given in Wikipedia pages (en, de, ru).)

They are herbaceous perennials growing to 10–15 cm (4–6 in) tall. The flowers are yellow (white in E. albiflora and E. pinnatifida), and among the first to appear in spring, as early as January in mild climates, though later where winter snowpack persists; they are frost-tolerant and readily survive fresh snow cover unharmed. The leaves only expand fully when the flowers are nearly finished; they are peltate, 5–8 cm diameter, with several notches, and only last for 2–3 months before dying down during the late spring.

Species in this genus are spring ephemerals, growing on forest floors and using the sunshine available below the canopy of deciduous trees before the leaves come out; the leaves die off when the shade from tree canopies becomes dense, or, in dry areas, when summer drought reduces water availability.

They are popular ornamental plants grown for their winter or early spring flowering. E. hyemalis is widely naturalised in northern Europe and North America.

== Species ==
- Eranthis albiflora. Western China.
- Eranthis cilicica. Southwestern Asia.
- Eranthis hyemalis. Southern Europe.
- Eranthis lobulata. Western China.
- Eranthis longistipitata. Central Asia.
- Eranthis pinnatifida. Japan.
- Eranthis sibirica. Northern Asia.
- Eranthis stellata. Eastern Asia (northern China, Korea, southeast Russia).
- Eranthis byunsanensis. South Korea

== Gallery ==
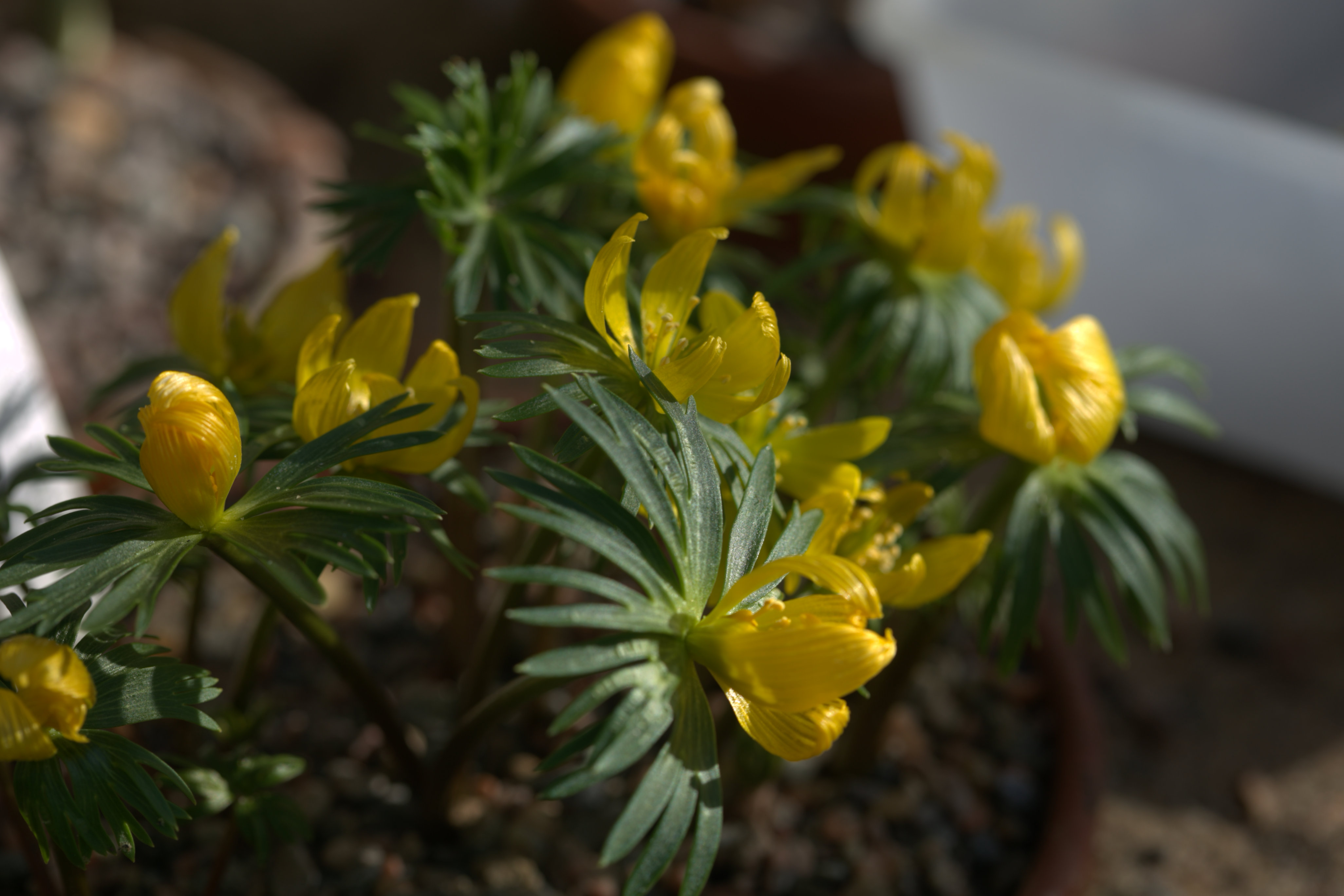
E. cilicica

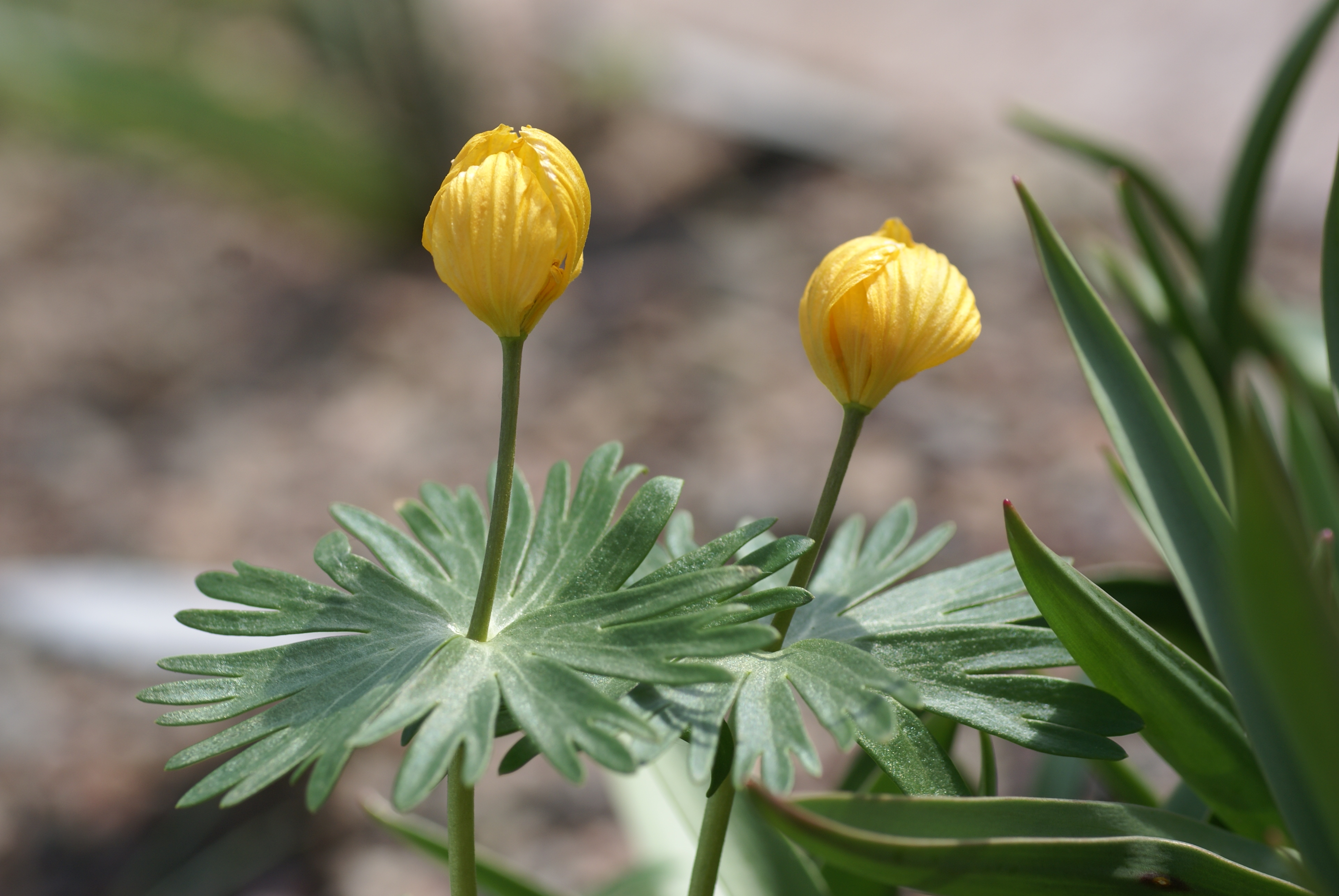
E. longistipitata

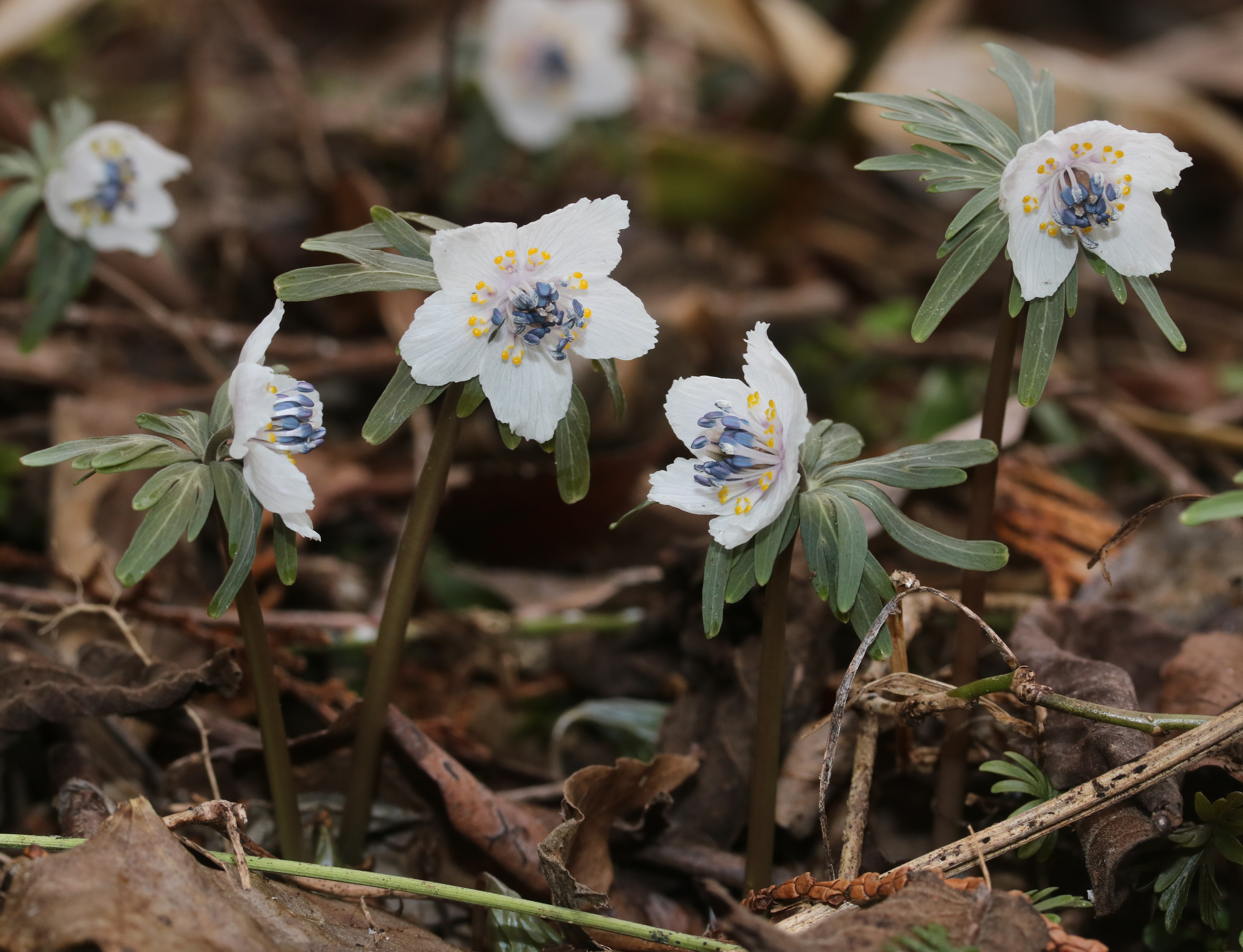
E. pinnatifida, Mount Ibuki, Japan

== See also ==
- Aconitum
- Aconitine
