= Gilbert White =

18th-century English priest and naturalist (1720–1793)

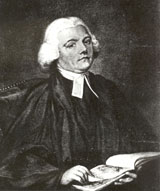
- Born: 18 July 1720; Selborne, Hampshire, England
- Died: 26 June 1793 (aged 72); Selborne, Hampshire, England
- Education: Oriel College, Oxford
- Known for: Natural History of Selborne
- Scientific career
- Fields: Natural history; Ornithology
- Author abbrev. (botany): G.White

Gilbert White (18 July 1720 – 26 June 1793) was a "parson-naturalist", a pioneering English naturalist, ecologist, and ornithologist. He is best known for his Natural History and Antiquities of Selborne.

== Life ==
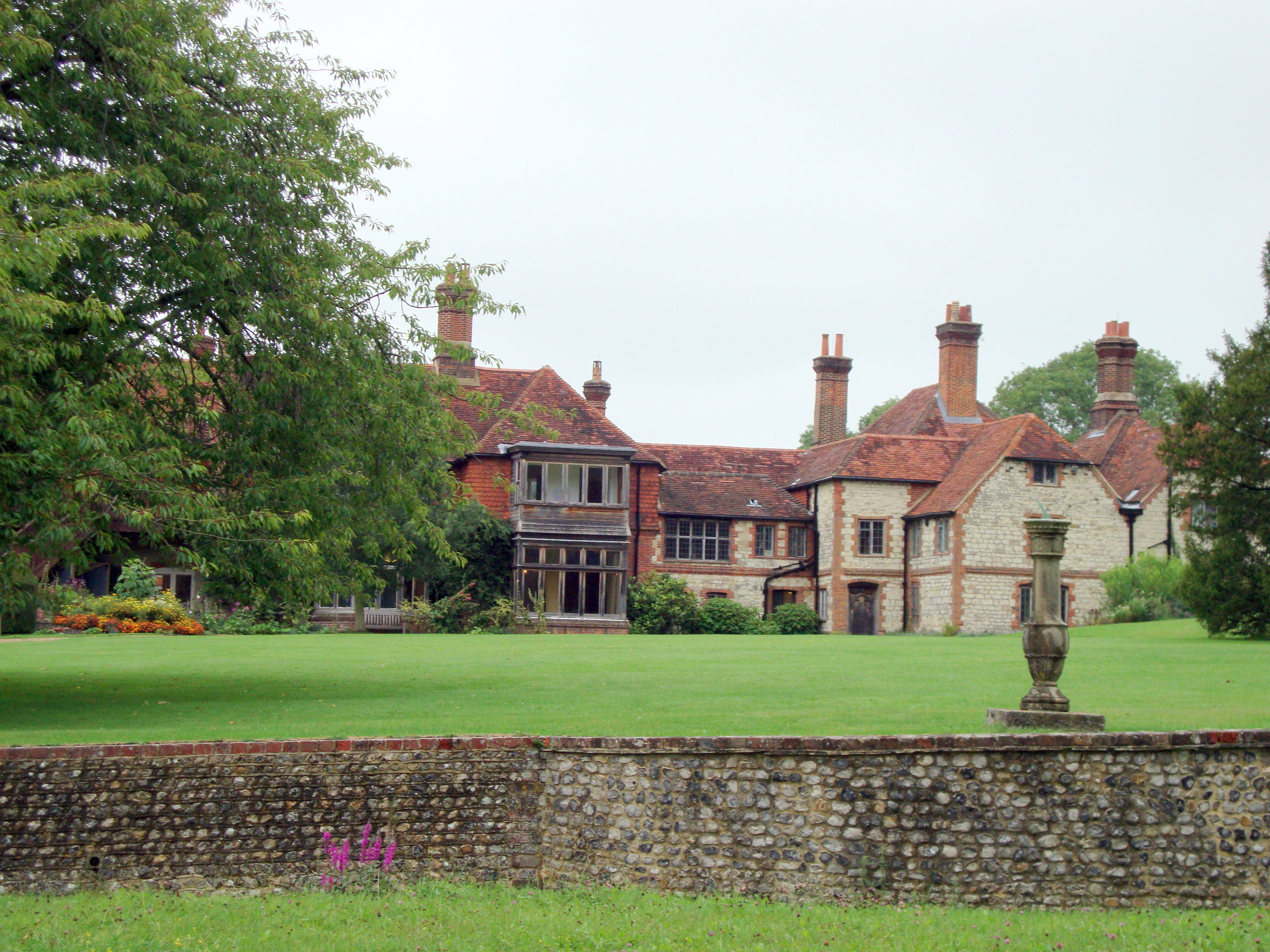
Gilbert White's house, The Wakes, now a museum, viewed from the back gardens in 2010

White was born on 18 July 1720 in his grandfather's vicarage at Selborne in Hampshire. His grandfather, also Gilbert White was at that time vicar of Selborne. Gilbert White's parents were John White (1688–1758) a trained barrister and Anne Holt (d. 1740). Gilbert was the eldest of eight surviving siblings, Thomas (b. 1724), Benjamin (b. 1725), Rebecca (b. 1726), John (b. 1727), Francis (b. 1728/29), Anne (b. 1731), and Henry (b. 1733). Gilbert's family lived briefly at Compton, Surrey, before moving into 'The Wakes' in 1728, that was to be his home for the rest of his long life.

Gilbert White was educated in Basingstoke by Thomas Warton, father of Joseph Warton and Thomas Warton, who would have been Gilbert's school fellows. There are also suggestions that he may have attended the Holy Ghost School before going to Oriel College, Oxford in December 1739. He took his degree as Bachelor of Arts in June 1743. In March 1744 he was elected fellow of the college. In October 1746 he became Master of Arts.

White obtained his deacon's orders in 1746, being fully ordained in 1749, and subsequently held several curacies in Hampshire and Wiltshire, including Selborne's neighbouring parishes of Newton Valence and Farringdon, as well as Selborne itself on four separate occasions. In 1752/53 White held the office of Junior Proctor at Oxford and was Dean of Oriel. In 1757 he became non-resident perpetual curate of Moreton Pinkney in Northamptonshire. After the death of his father in 1758, White moved back into the family home at The Wakes in Selborne, which he eventually inherited in 1763. In 1784 he became curate of Selborne for the fourth time, remaining so until his death. Having studied at Oriel, at the behest of his uncle, he was ineligible to be considered for the permanent living of Selborne, which was in the gift of Magdalen College.

White died in 1793 and was buried in the graveyard of St Mary's Church, Selborne.

== Career ==
White is regarded by many as England's first ecologist, and one of those who shaped the modern attitude of respect for nature. He said of the earthworm:

Earthworms, though in appearance a small and despicable link in the chain of nature, yet, if lost, would make a lamentable chasm. [...] worms seem to be the great promoters of vegetation, which would proceed but lamely without them...

The later naturalist Charles Darwin, when asked in 1870 about books that had deeply impressed him in his youth, mentioned White's writings. However, in Darwin's book, The Formation of Vegetable Mould: Through the Action of Worms, with Observations of Their Habits (1881), there is no footnote acknowledgement of White's earlier work in The Natural History and Antiquities of Selborne on the significance of earthworms in creating and maintaining topsoil. Although Darwin clearly states White had a deep understanding of worm behaviour. (See page 14 of Darwin's The Formation of Vegetable Mould). It has been argued that Darwin might not have propounded the theory of evolution without White's pioneering fieldwork establishing the importance of close observation.

Rather than studying dead specimens, White observed live birds and animals in their own habitats over many years; creating a 'new kind of zoology, scientific, precise and based on the steady accumulation of detail'. The Natural History represents a shift to holistic, evidence-based engagement warmed by empathy. From nearly 40 years of observations, White recognised that birds and animals have inner lives. He based his work on accurate (if haphazard) recording of events, classifying, measuring, analysing data, making deductions from observations, and experimenting. He was 'one of the first writers to show that it was possible to write of the natural world with a fresh and intensely personal vision without in any way sacrificing precision'. Thus, Richard Mabey quotes White: 'during this lovely weather the congregating flocks of house martins on the Church and tower were very beautiful and very amusing! When they flew off all together from the roof, on any alarm, they quite swarmed in the air. But they soon settled again in heaps on the shingles; where preening their feathers to admit the rays of the sun, they seemed highly to enjoy the warm situation.' White's scientific outlook was coloured by his theology. He did not have grand theories, plan experiments and replicate them as a modern scientist would: he was more freewheeling and, arguably, as a consequence more appealing as a writer.

White and William Markwick collected records of the dates of emergence of more than 400 plant and animal species, White recording in Hampshire and Markwick in Sussex between 1768 and 1793. These data, summarised in The Natural History and Antiquities of Selborne as the earliest and latest dates for each event over the 25-year period, are among the earliest examples of modern phenology.

American nature writer, Donald C. Peattie, writes in The Road of a Naturalist about White's contribution to the public interest in birds: "The bird census, now so widely promulgated by the Audubon Society, was the invention of Gilbert White; he was the original exponent, as far as I know, of the close seasonal observation of Nature, a branch of science known to the pedantic as phenology. He was the first to perceive the value in the study of migration (then a disputed fact) and of banding or ringing birds, though it was Audubon who first performed the experiment. No professional ornithologist ever did so much to widen interest in birds; from White's pages they cock a friendly eye at us, and hop out of his leaves right over our thresholds."

'White's other contributions to the field of natural history are impressive, for example, his close observation and recording of events over time led him to develop the idea of the 'food chain', laying the foundations for the modern study of ecology; he discovered a distinction between three species of leaf warblers based on their different songs; he pioneered modern theories on bird territory and its effects on their population. Even today, most naturalists will have read White and often refer to his work for its insights and investigative achievements.'

His 1783–84 diary corroborates the dramatic climatic impacts of the volcanic 'Laki haze' that spread from Iceland with lethal consequences across Europe.

White's sister Anne was married to Thomas Barker (1722–1809), called 'The father of meteorology', and Gilbert maintained a correspondence with his nephew Samuel Barker, who also kept a naturalist's journal.

== The Natural History and Antiquities of Selborne ==
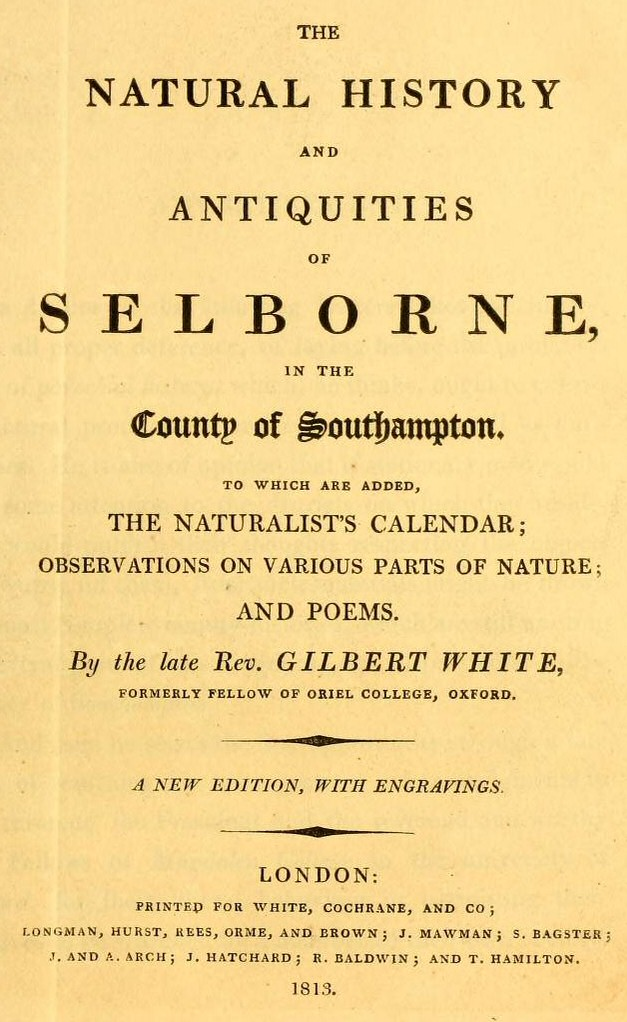
Title page of White's Natural History, which he published late in life

White is best known for his The Natural History and Antiquities of Selborne (1789). This is presented as a compilation of his letters to Thomas Pennant, the leading British zoologist of the day, and the Hon. Daines Barrington, an English barrister and another Fellow of the Royal Society, though a number of the 'letters' such as the first nine were never posted, and were written especially for the book. The book has been continuously in print since its first publication. It was long held, "probably apocryphally", to be the fourth-most published book in the English language after the Bible, the works of Shakespeare, and John Bunyan's The Pilgrim's Progress.

White's biographer, Richard Mabey, praises White's expressiveness:

What is striking is the way Gilbert [White] often arranges his sentence structure to echo the physical style of a bird's flight. So 'The white-throat uses odd jerks and gesticulations over the tops of hedges and bushes'; and 'Woodpeckers fly volatu undosu [in an undulating flight], opening and closing their wings at every stroke, and so are always rising and falling in curves.'

== Legacy ==
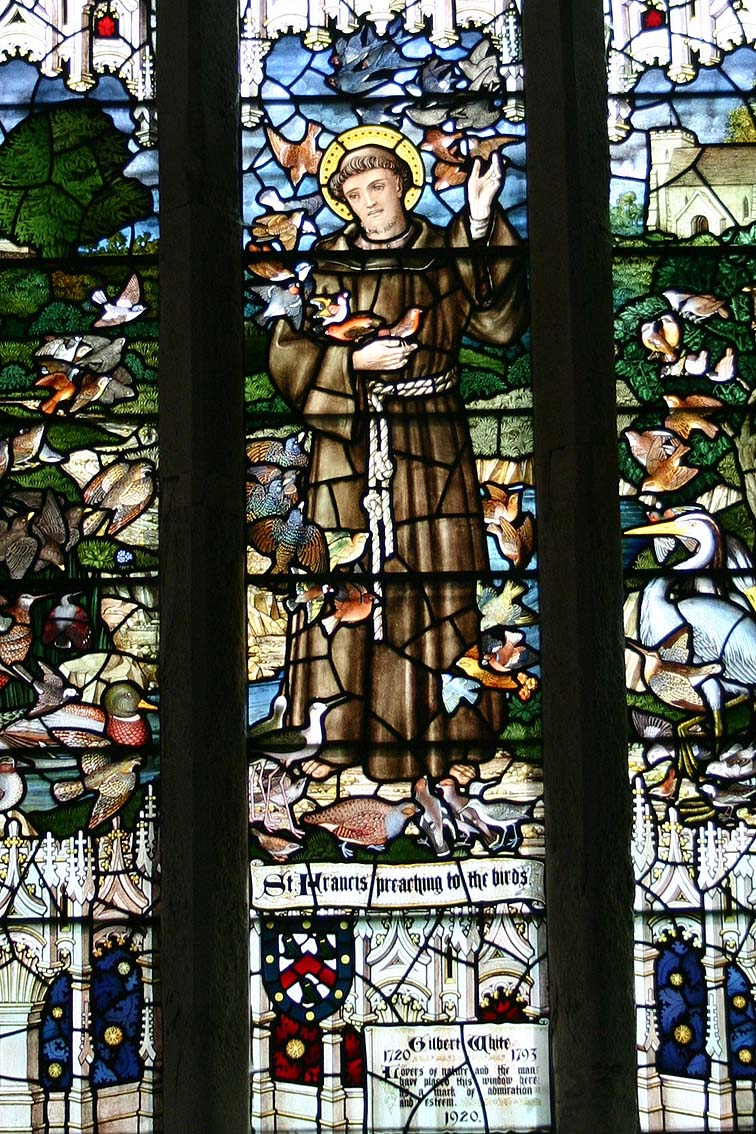
The stained glass window commemorating White in Selborne church

White has often been seen as an amateur "country writer", especially by the scientific community. However, he has been called "the indispensable precursor to those great Victorians who would transform our ideas about life on Earth, especially in the undergrowth – Lyell, Spencer, Huxley and Darwin." He is also under-rated as a pioneer of modern scientific research methods, particularly fieldwork. As Mabey argues, the blending of scientific and emotional responses to Nature was White's greatest legacy: "it helped foster the growth of ecology and the realisation that humans were also part of the natural scheme of things."

The White family house in Selborne, The Wakes, now contains the Gilbert White Museum, a registered charity. The Selborne Society was founded in 1895 to perpetuate the memory of Gilbert White. It purchased land by the Grand Union Canal at Perivale in West London to create the first Bird Sanctuary in Britain, known as Perivale Wood. In the 1970s, Perivale Wood became a Local Nature Reserve. This initiative was led by a group of young naturalists, notably Edward Dawson and Peter Edwards, Kevin Roberts and Andrew Duff. It was designated by Ealing Borough Council under the National Parks and Access to the Countryside Act 1949. Flora Thompson, the countryside novelist, said of White: "It is easy to imagine him, this very first of English nature writers, the most sober and modest, yet happiest of men."

White is quoted by Merlyn in The Once and Future King by T.H. White and in The Boy in Grey by Henry Kingsley, in which White's thrush appears as a character. A documentary about White, presented by historian Michael Wood, was broadcast by BBC Four in 2006. White is commemorated in the inscription on one of eight bells installed in 2009 at Holybourne, Hampshire and in the Perivale Wood Local Nature Reserve, which is dedicated to his memory. The Reserve is owned and managed by the Selborne Society, named to commemorate White's Natural History. White's frequent accounts of a tortoise inherited from his aunt in The Natural History and Antiquities of Selborne form the basis for Verlyn Klinkenborg's book, Timothy; or, Notes of an Abject Reptile (2006), and for Sylvia Townsend Warner's The Portrait of a Tortoise (1946).

A stained glass window portraying St Francis of Assisi in Selborne church commemorates Gilbert White. It was designed by Horace Hinckes and was installed in 1920.

White's influence on artists is celebrated in the exhibition Drawn to Nature: Gilbert White and the Artists taking place in spring 2020 at Pallant House Gallery in Chichester to mark the 300th anniversary of his birth, and including artworks by Thomas Bewick, Eric Ravilious and John Piper, amongst others. The exhibition catalog was written by Simon Martin ISBN 978-1-869-82775-5

In September 2025, A Year with Gilbert White: The First Great Nature Writer, a biography by Jenny Uglow was published.

White is credited with perhaps the earliest written record of the word "golly", in a journal entry from 1775.

== Works ==
- White, Gilbert (1795). A Naturalist's Calendar, with observations in various branches of natural history, extracted from the papers of the late Rev. Gilbert White of Selborne, Hampshire, Senior Fellow of Oriel College, Oxford. Never before published. London: printed for B. and J. White, Horace's Head, Fleet Street. Edited by J. Aikin.

== Sources ==
- Cousin, John William (1910), "White, Gilbert", A Short Biographical Dictionary of English Literature, London: J. M. Dent & Sons – via Wikisource
- Baigent, Francis Joseph; Millard, James Elwin (1889). A History of the Ancient Town and Manor of Basingstoke in the County of Southampton; With a Brief Account of the Siege of Basing House, A.D. 1643-1645. Basingstoke: C. J. Jacob.
- Mabey, Richard (1986). Gilbert White: A biography of the author of The Natural History of Selborne. London: Century Hutchinson. OCLC 906495663.
- Newton, Alfred (1900). "White, Gilbert" . In Lee, Sidney (ed.). Dictionary of National Biography. Vol. 61. London: Smith, Elder & Co.
- Worster, D. 1994. Nature's Economy: A History of Ecological Ideas (2nd ed.). Cambridge; New York, NY, USA: Cambridge University Press.
