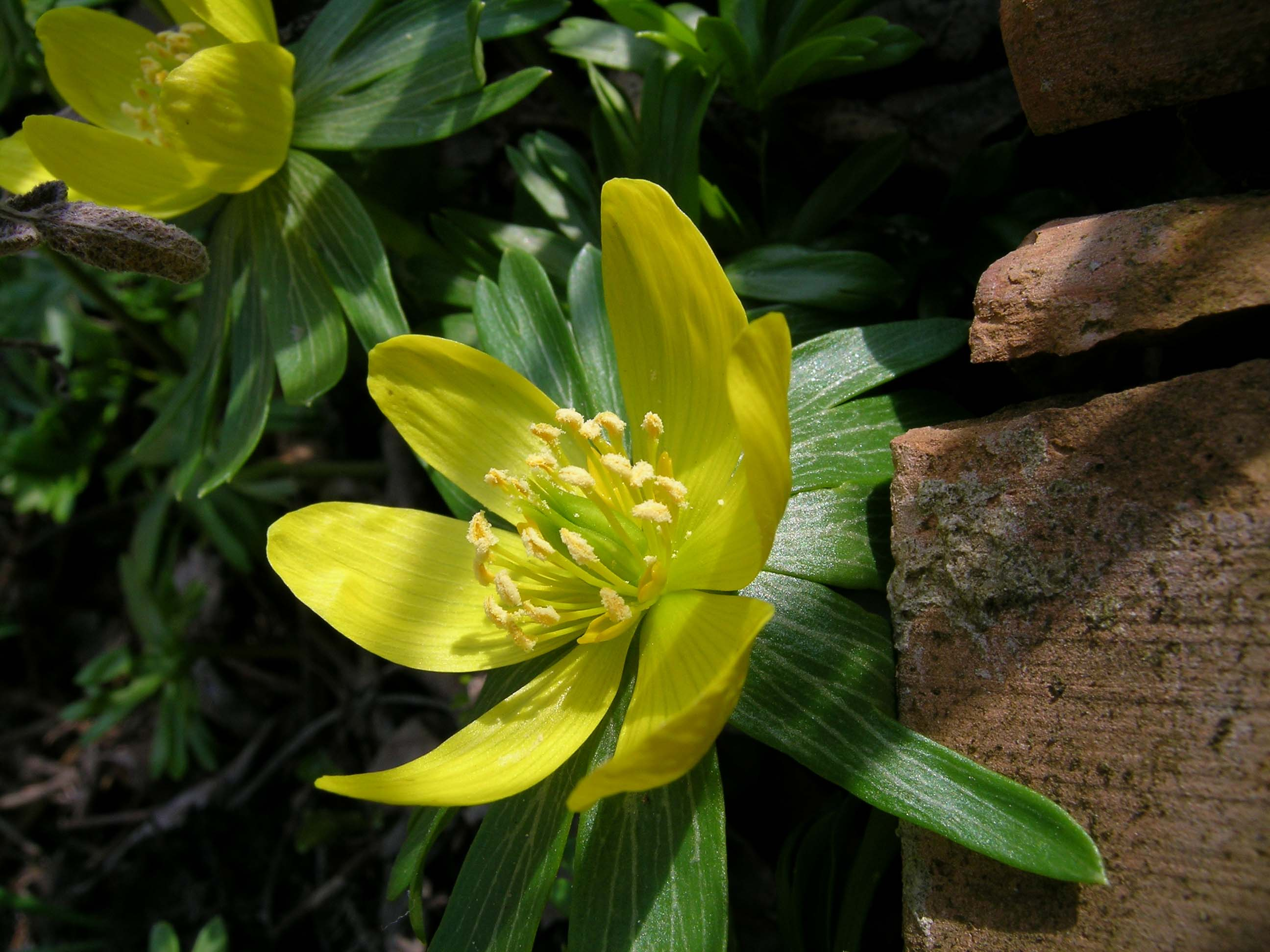

Scientific classification
- Kingdom: Plantae
- Clade: Embryophytes
- Clade: Tracheophytes
- Clade: Spermatophytes
- Clade: Angiosperms
- Clade: Eudicots
- Order: Ranunculales
- Family: Ranunculaceae
- Genus: Eranthis
- Species: E. hyemalis

Binomial name
- Eranthis hyemalis (L.) Salisb.

= Eranthis hyemalis =

Species of flowering plant

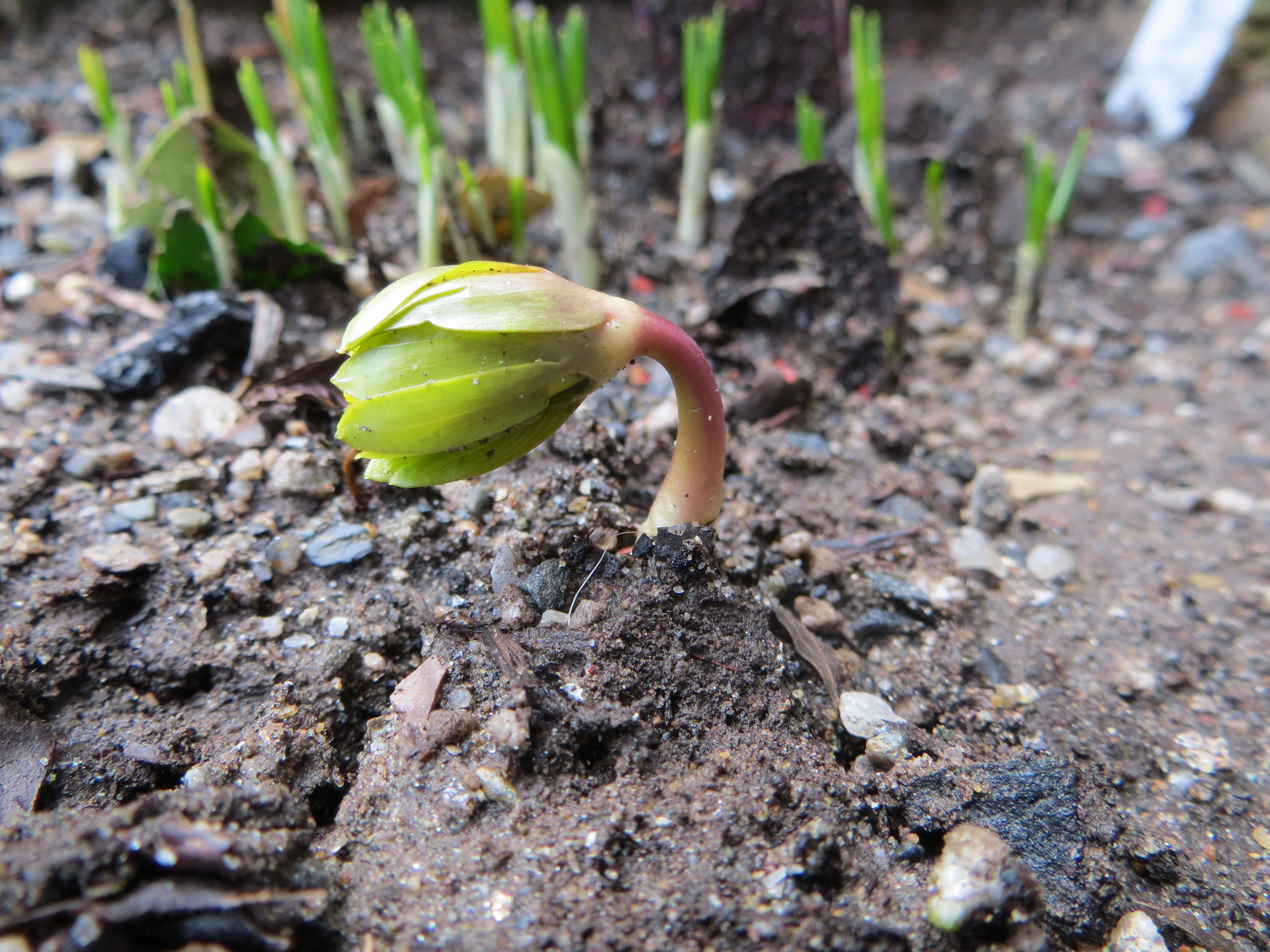
Shoot emerging from soil in early spring

Eranthis hyemalis, the winter aconite, is a species of flowering plant in the buttercup family Ranunculaceae, native to calcareous woodland habitats in France, Italy and the Balkans, and widely naturalized elsewhere in Europe.

== Description ==
It is a tuberous-rooted herbaceous perennial growing to 15 centimetres (6 inches), with large (2–3 cm or 0.79–1.18 in), yellow, cup-shaped flowers held above a collar of three leaf-like bracts, appearing in late winter and early spring. The six sepals are bright yellow and petaloid, and the petals are of tubular nectaries. There are numerous stamens and usually six unfused carpels. The fruit are follicles each containing several seeds.

As a spring ephemeral plant, its life cycle exploits the deciduous woodland canopy, flowering at the time of maximum sunlight reaching the forest floor, then completely dying back to its underground tuber after flowering.

== Names ==
The Latin specific epithet hyemalis means "winter-flowering", while the name of the genus is a compound of the Greek elements Er 'Spring' and anthos 'flower' - so named for its early flowering.

== Cultivation ==
The plant is valued in cultivation as one of the earliest flowers to appear. E. hyemalis and the sterile hybrid cultivar 'Guinea Gold' have gained the Royal Horticultural Society's Award of Garden Merit.

== Toxicity ==
All parts of the plant are poisonous when consumed by humans and other mammals, because it contains cardiac glycosides similar to those present in Adonis vernalis. Glycosides of this type stimulate the heart when administered in small doses, but in very large doses may cause serious, often irreparable heart damage. Poisoning symptoms include colicky abdominal pains, nausea, vomiting, diarrhoea, disturbed vision, dyspnea, bradycardia, and, in severe cases, cardiac arrest. Specific cardiac glycosides present in E. hyemalis include Eranthin A and B, belonging to the bufadienolide group, also found in (and named for) the toad venom bufotoxin.
