= 2008 Nobel Prize in Literature =

- Jean-Marie Gustave Le Clézio
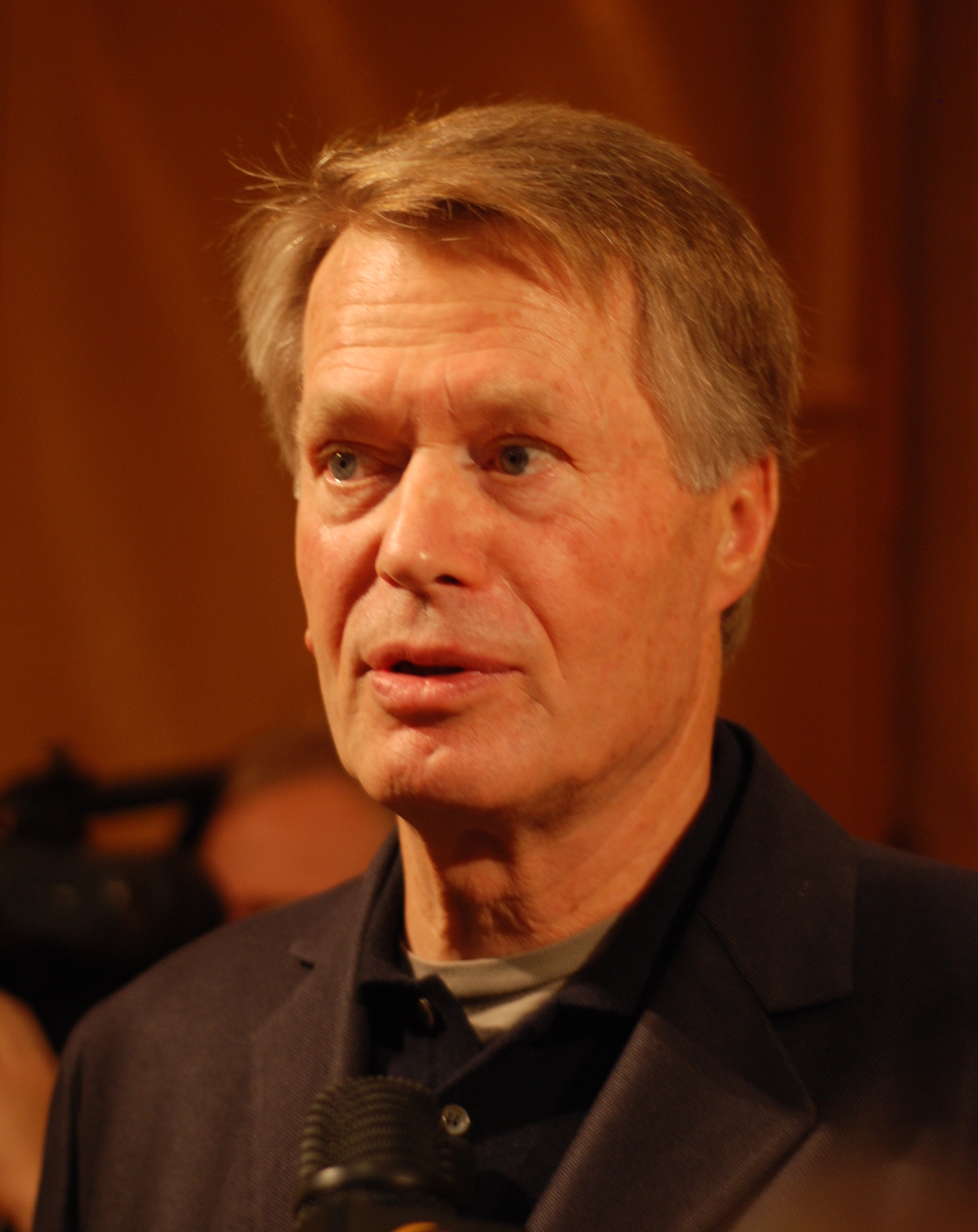
- "author of new departures, poetic adventure and sensual ecstasy, explorer of a humanity beyond and below the reigning civilization."
- Date: 9 October 2008 (announcement); 10 December 2008 (ceremony)
- Location: Stockholm, Sweden
- Presented by: Swedish Academy
- First award: 1901
- Website: Official website

The 2008 Nobel Prize in Literature was awarded to the French novelist Jean-Marie Gustave Le Clézio (born 1940), better known with his pen name J. M. G. Le Clézio, as an "author of new departures, poetic adventure and sensual ecstasy, explorer of a humanity beyond and below the reigning civilization." He became the 14th French-language author to receive the Nobel Prize for Literature after Claude Simon in 1985 and was followed later by Patrick Modiano in 2014.

== Laureate ==
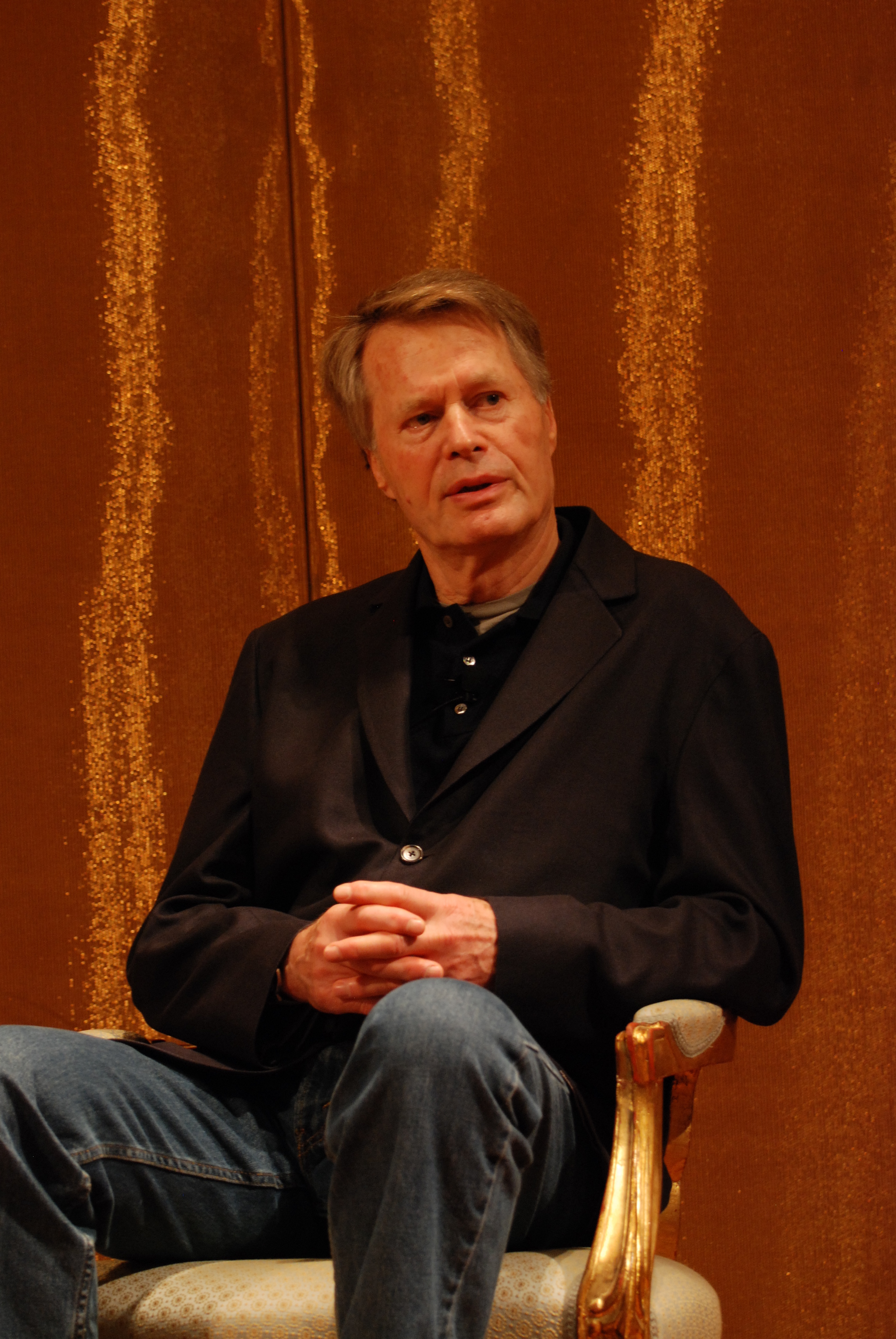
Le Clézio at the press conference in Stockholm, 6 December 2008.

J. M. G. Le Clézio's literary career highlights different cultures in different times and challenges Western civilization's dominance. He questions modern society's materialistic superficiality, which chokes what is genuine in people's relationships with others, with nature, and with the past. Le Clézio, who writes in prose, has published over 40 works since his 1963 début with Le Procès-verbal ("The Interrogation", 1963). His major breakthrough came with Desert in 1980. With its flowing prose, the books stands in contrast to his earlier works' more experimental style. His other famous literary prose include Le Déluge ("The Flood", 1996), Le Chercheur d'or ("The Prospector", 1985), Onitsha (1991), and Étoile errante ("Wandering Star", 1992).

== Candidates ==
Le Clézio was one of the favourites to win the 2008 Nobel Prize in Literature along with Syrian poet Adunis, Swedish poet Tomas Tranströmer (awarded in 2011), American novelist Philip Roth, Dutch writer Cees Nooteboom, Italian scholar Claudio Magris and Chinese poet Bei Dao. According to the British betting agency Ladbrokes, other perennial favorite authors who were tipped to win the prize included Israeli author Amos Oz, American prolific writer Joyce Carol Oates, Japanese writer Haruki Murakami, Nigerian novelist Chinua Achebe, Australian poet Les Murray, Canadian author Michael Ondaatje, and American sci-fi writer Ursula K. Le Guin.

== Reactions ==
The choice of Le Clézio was well received by Swedish commentators. Kaj Schueler, literature editor of Svenska Dagbladet said: "Not quite unexpected, and very pleasing it is the first French Nobel prize since 1985 when Claude Simon got it". Björn Linell, chair of Swedish PEN, said: "It is very pleasing because this is an authorship for all tastes". Le Clézio himself said: "I am very happy and rather surprised, I did not expect this at all. I'm not sure I deserve it."

== Nobel lecture ==
Le Clézio delivered his Nobel lecture at the Swedish Academy on 7 December 2008. He used his lecture to attack the subject of information poverty. The title of his lecture was Dans la forêt des paradoxes ("In the forest of paradoxes"), a title he attributed to Stig Dagerman.

== Award ceremony speech ==
At the award ceremony in Stockholm on 10 December 2008, Horace Engdahl of the Swedish Academy said:

This year’s Laureate in Literature belongs to the tradition of the critique of civilisation (...) Few authors have so convincingly described how reluctantly languages and cultures die. (...)

Le Clézio’s imagination sustains itself in the unexplored regions where fear and ecstasy arise, inseparable from one another. It may seem surprising to call him a hopeful author, given the significant strain of colonial devastation, bourgeois oppressiveness, and social injustice in his themes. Still, he deserves such a designation. The earth’s lustre, the sun, the sea, and the vast expanses, the irrepressible feeling of freedom that comes with a new departure – these are the forces that outweigh the sorrow about the path that our civilisation has taken.

== Gallery ==
- 9 October 2008: Announcement of the 2008 Nobel Prize laureate in Literature at the Swedish Academy by Horace Engdahl.
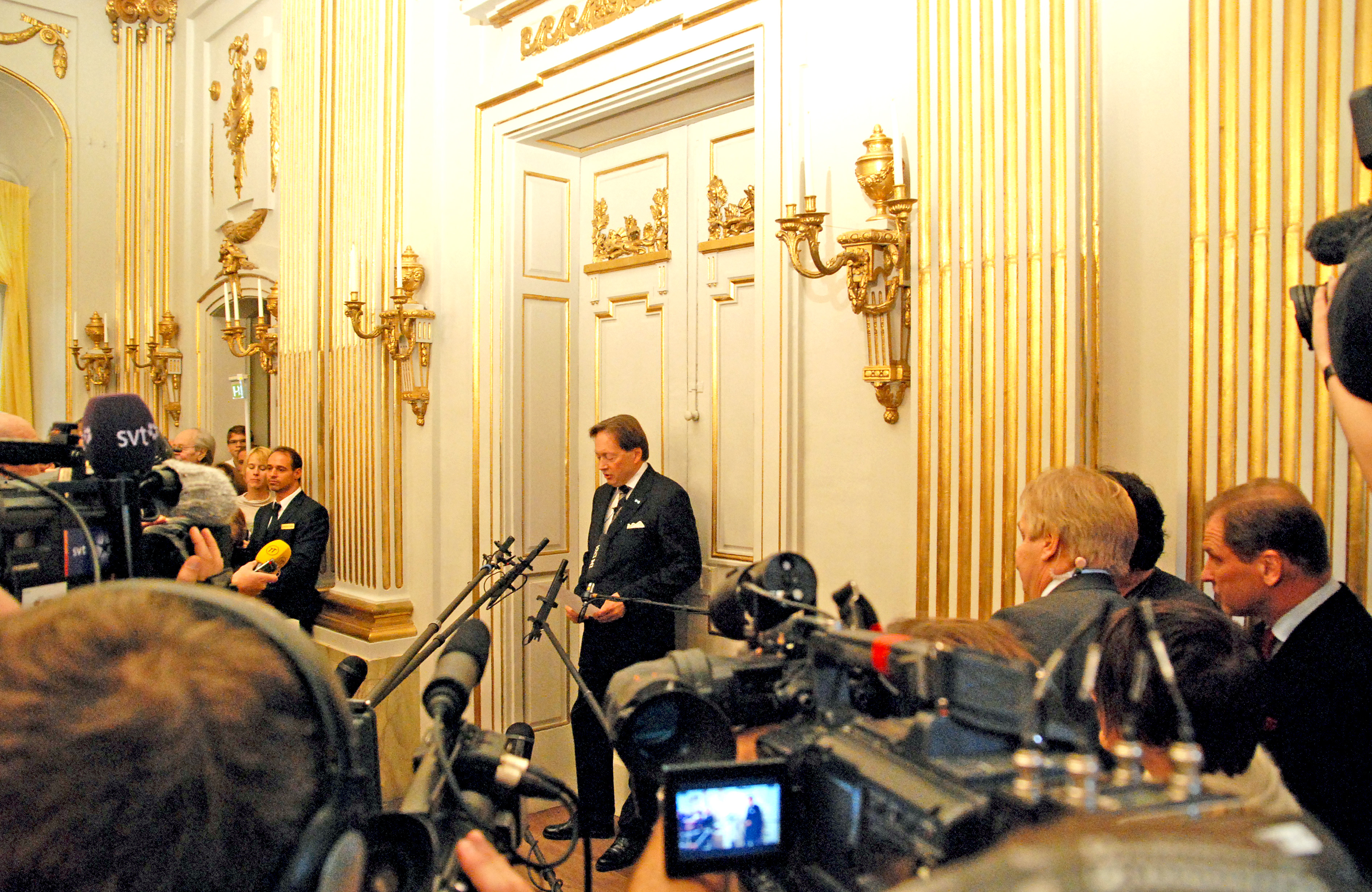

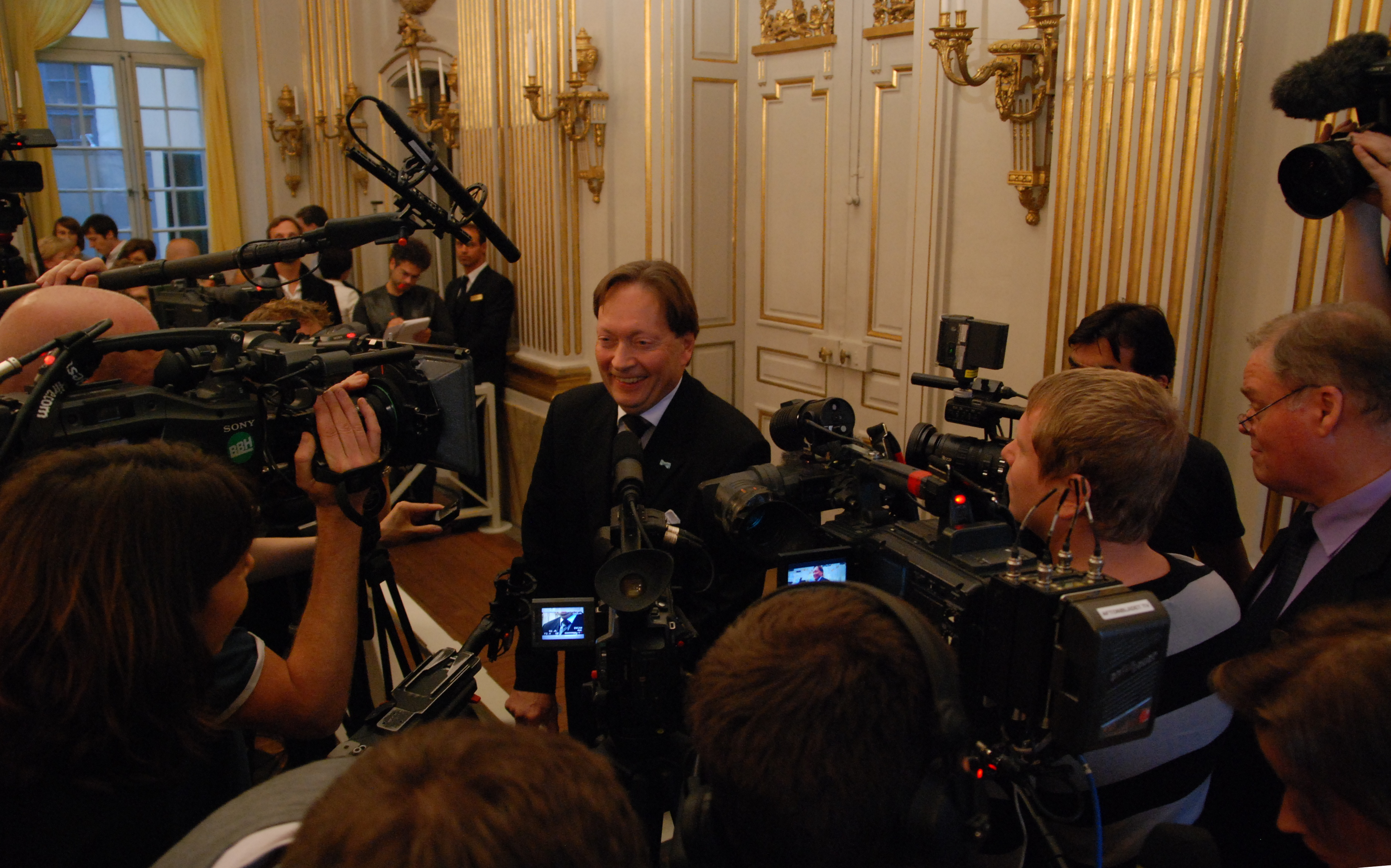

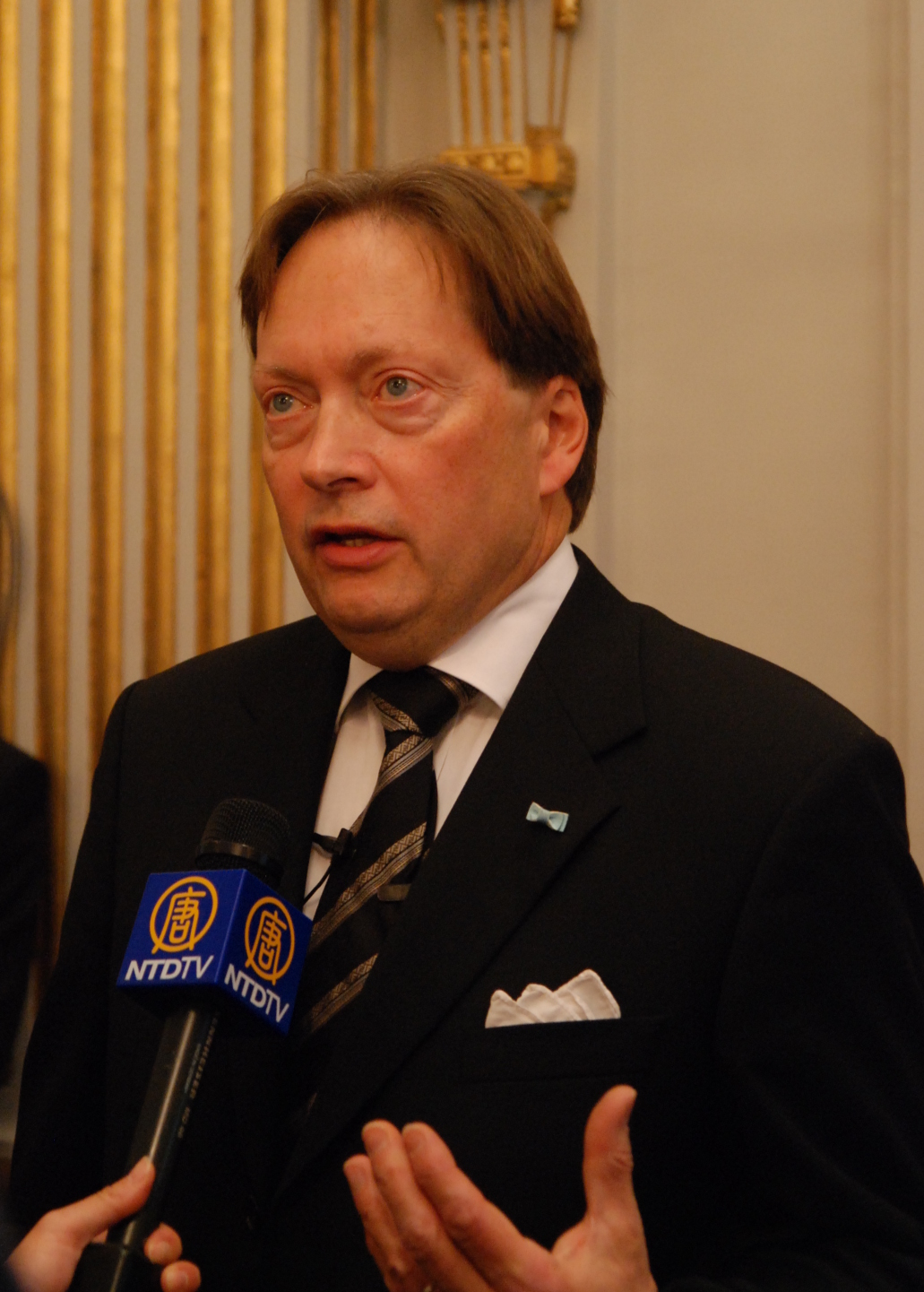
- 6 December 2008: Jean-Marie Gustave Le Clézio entertaining questions during the Swedish Academy's press conference.
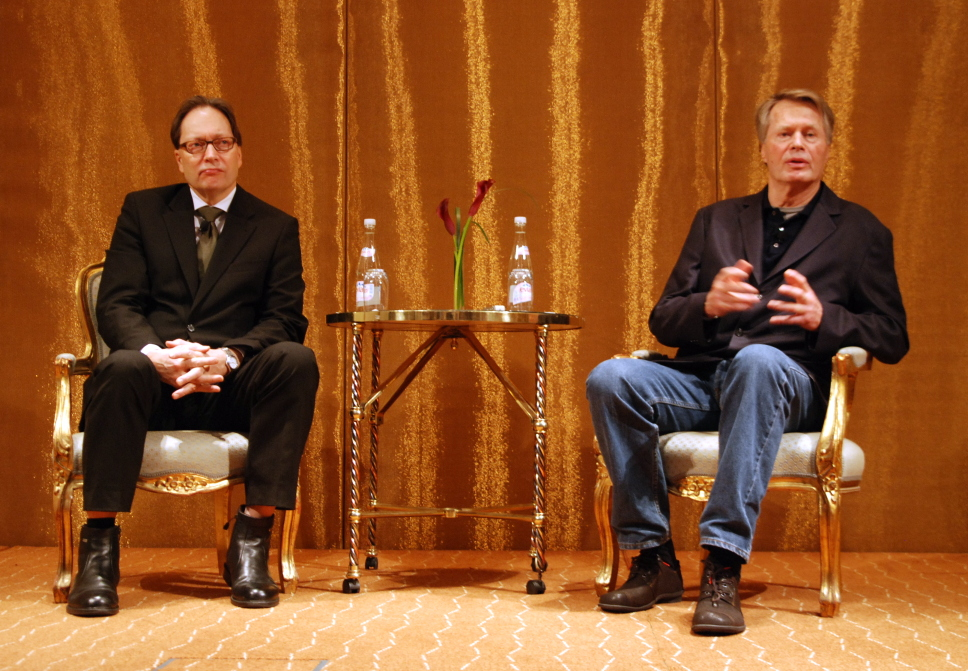

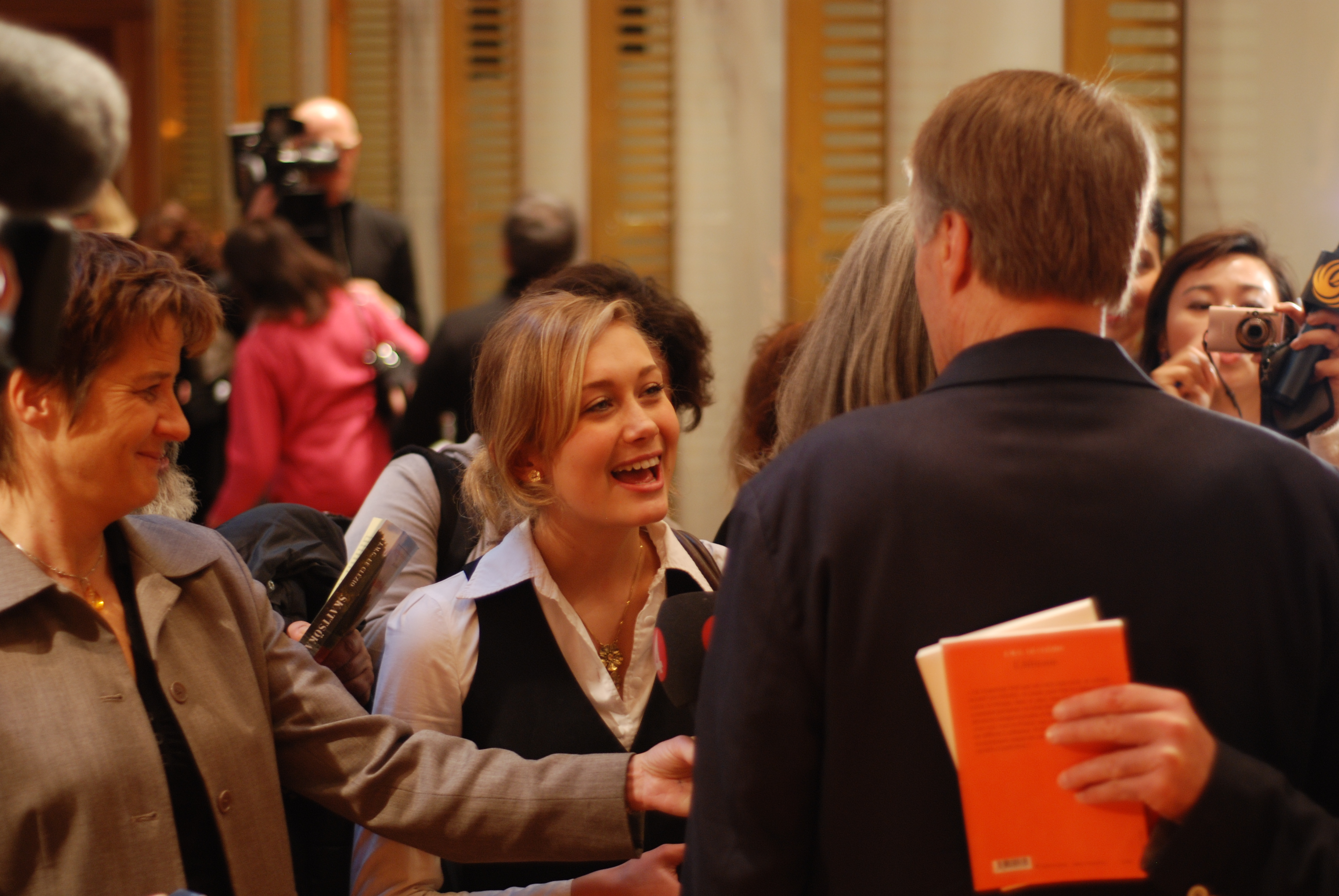

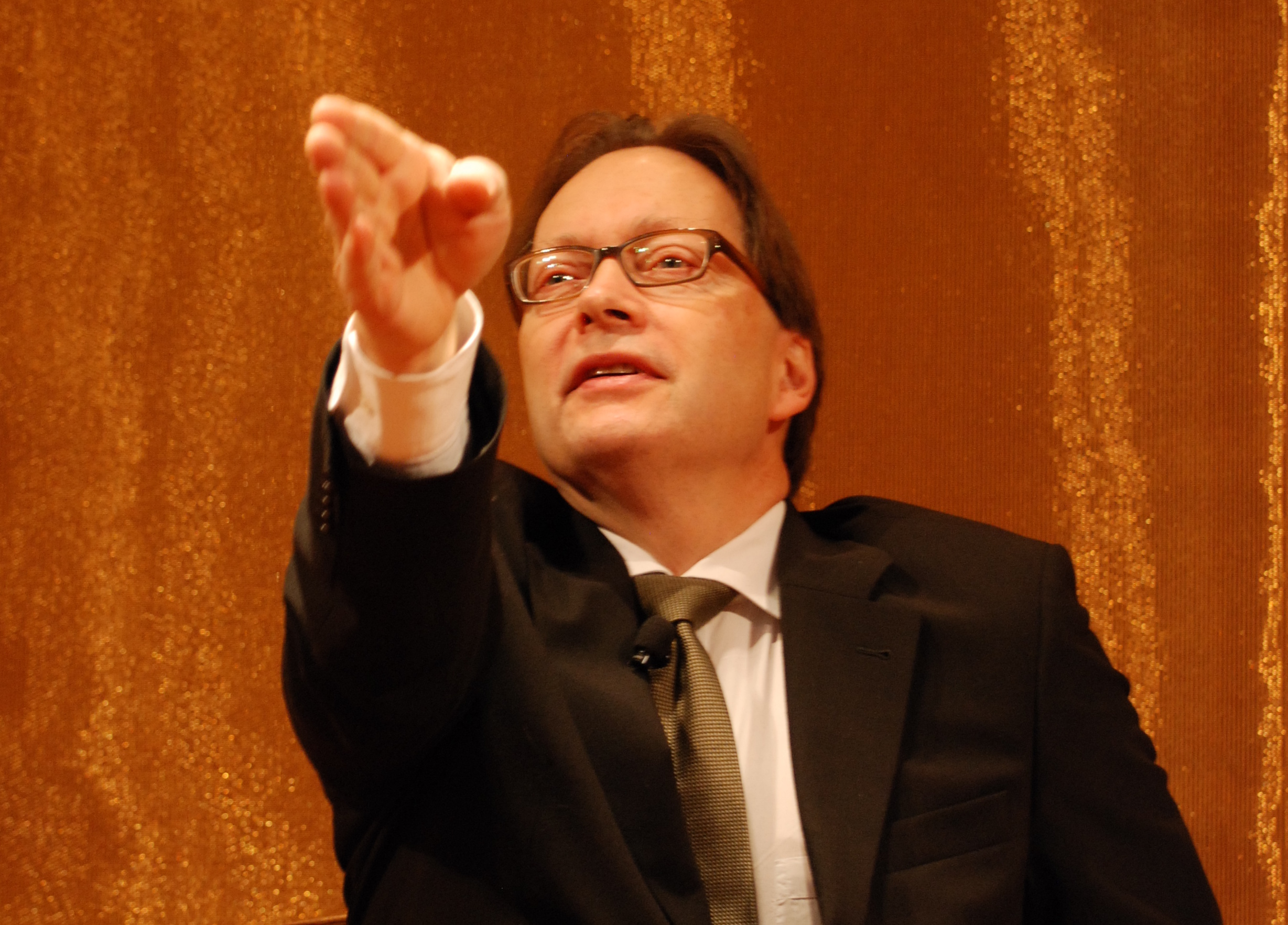
