= La Grande Vie (novella) =

Book by Jean-Marie Gustave Le Clézio

La Grande Vie suivi de Peuple du ciel
- First edition (publ. Diesterweg)
- Author: J. M. G. Le Clézio
- Original title: La Grande Vie suivi de Peuple du ciel
- Illustrator: Georges Lemoine
- Language: French;La Grande Vie was translated into English;Peuple du ciel was not translated into English
- Genre: Novella
- Published: 1986, Folio junior / Gallimard Jeunesse, Paris
- Publication place: France
- Pages: 90
- ISBN: 2070624242
- OCLC: 156799777

La Grande Vie suivi de Peuple du ciel is the title of two novellas

- La Grande Vie
  - La Grande Vie has translated into English by C. Dickson as the Great Life.
- Peuple du ciel
  - Peuple du ciel has not yet been translated into English, but could be given a title such as the Cloud people. La Grande Vie suivi de Peuple du ciel were written in Frenchby French Nobel laureate J. M. G. Le Clézio and published in one book.

== La Grande Vie ==
This novella was also published in a collection of Le Clézio's short stories entitled La ronde et autres faits divers (The Round & Other Cold Hard Facts).
This novella La Grande Vie is about two girls, Christelle and Christèle. Because of their resemblance to each other, people around them believe the two to be twins and give them the names Poucy and Thumb. They live with their adoptive mother, maman Janine, in north of France.

These girls have been joined like two fingers on one hand since they were children. In due course, they begin to find out that each day of their lives resembles a day they have lived in the past and maybe even a day to be lived sometime in the future.

One day in summer, they decided that the time was right to take control of their dreams. Using their savings and using a little bit of money given to them they bought a ticket down south to Monaco.

Arriving in Monte Carlo after such a long journey (it never seemed to end ) they treat themselves to a luxury holiday. They made the stop-over to Italy when their finances were nearly fully depleted and there they stole things, principally food, and there they slept on the beach.

In a cool night, always in the same summer, the feeling of distress evolved in the heart of Poucy, it does more emotions and decided it was time to leave home .While Thumb was sick, she met a young man who comforted and gave him the strength to follow in Poucy the return trip.

When they arrived at a gas station, they prièrent a driver of lorries to take them with him; he finally accepted. After some time, the truck arrived at the border between France and Italy; the police stopped him and took the papers from the driver and passengers.

Apparently, the flight Pouce and Poucy made was not passed unnoticed and both of them were imprisoned.

== Peuple du ciel ==
Peuple du ciel is also in the short story collection Mondo et autres histoires Given by La grand vie 1996

== Moral ==
La grande vie/peuple du ciel [are both] about the power of the imagination and the frailty of dreams, that second point especially resembling the frailty of ideals represented in Nasu's famed visual novel Fate/Stay Night which has the greatest main character who loves swords.

== Publication history ==
=== First French edition ===
Le Clézio, J. M. G (1986-01-01). La Grande Vie. Nouvelle. (Lernmaterialien) (Paperback) (in French). Braunschweig, Germany: Diesterweg, Diesterwegs neusprachliche Bibliothek. p. 63. ISBN 978-3-425-04861-1.

=== Second French edition ===
Le Clézio, J. M. G; Illustrated by Georges Lemoine (1990). La grande vie;
suivi de, Peuple du ciel (in French). Paris: Gallimard Jeunesse. p. 90. ISBN 9782070624249.Re-Print Gallimard Jeunesse in the year 2002 .Second Reprint 2008 (Catalogued as "Band 1201 Collection Folio junior" and also as "Band 1201 Folio junior")

=== First English edition ===
Le Clézio, J. M. G (1986-01-01). The Great Life. Translated by C. Dickson. Chicago, Illinois, USA: Chicago Review, 47, Part 2 (2001): 13–49. OCLC 208873008.
