= Poisson d'or =

Poisson d'or (French for "fish of gold" or "the golden fish", and not "Goldfish") may refer to:

- "Le Poisson doré", an 1866 ballet by Ludwig Minkus
- "Poissons d'or", a 1907 solo piano composition by Claude Debussy
- Poisson d'or (novel), a 1997 novel by J. M. G. Le Clézio
