= Ritournelle de la faim =

Novel by J. M. G. Le Clézio

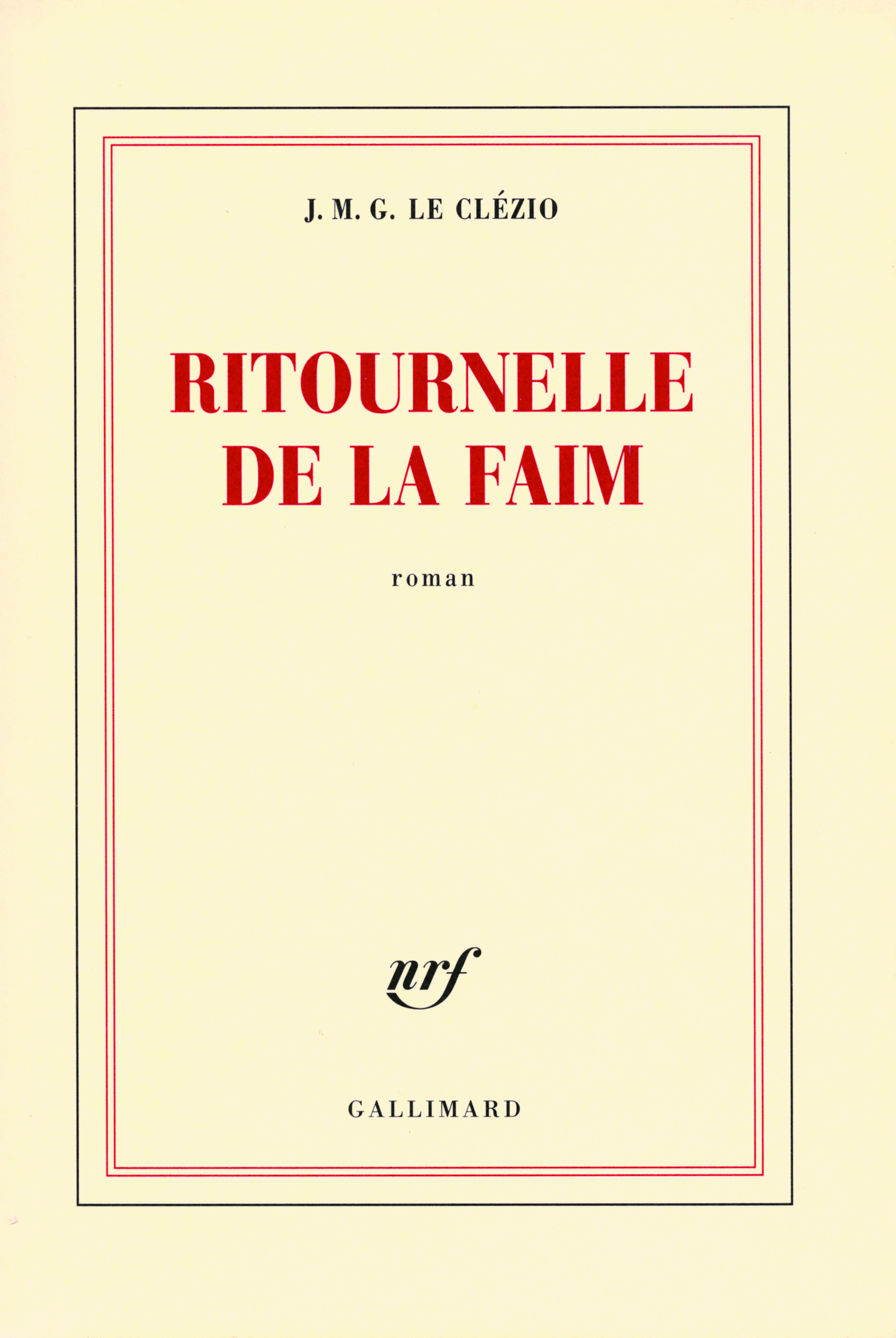
- 2008 Gallimard 'Collection Blanche' edition
- Author: J. M. G. Le Clézio
- Original title: Ritournelle de la faim
- Language: French
- Genre: Novel
- Publisher: Gallimard, Collection Blanche
- Publication date: 1 October 2008
- Publication place: France
- Media type: Print
- Pages: 206 pp
- ISBN: 978-2-07-012283-7
- OCLC: 261400573
- LC Class: PQ2672.E25 R58 2008

Ritournelle de la faim (The Same Old Story of Hunger, or The Refrain of Hunger) is a novel written in French by French Nobel laureate J. M. G. Le Clézio.

== Plot summary ==
Set in Paris in the 1930s, it deals with the story of Ethel, a young woman who must save herself and her parents, torn by the age's politics and their hatred for each other. The story seems so simple. A narrator who is and is not the author tells the story of a young girl – Ethel Brown – who is and is not the mother of JMG Le Clézio.

=== French language text sample ===
French language text sample from Ritournelle de la faim can be read online.

== Publication history ==
=== Paris: Lire ===
- Lire no. 369, (2008): 64

=== First French edition ===
- Le Clézio, J. M. G (2008). Ritournelle de la faim (in French). Paris: Gallimard, Collection Blanche. p. 206. ISBN 978-2-07-012283-7.
