= L'Extase matérielle =

- 1967 edition
- Author: J. M. G. Le Clézio
- Language: French
- Genre: Essay
- Publisher: Gallimard, Paris and Imprint from colophon by Mayenne : Impr. Floch, 1993.
- Publication date: 1967
- Publication place: France
- Pages: 221
- ISBN: 978-2-07-032745-4
- OCLC: 150450422

"L'Extase matérielle" is an essay written by French Nobel laureate J. M. G. Le Clézio. The book's title means "Material Ecstasy" in English. This essay may be advising that we should pay the utmost attention to what there is around us, not to what there might be or ought to be. According to a review of "L'Extase matérielle" the reasoning behind the essay is to accept that "what there is is all there is"(and to demand more is ludicrous)

== Writing style ==
This essay consists of personal deliberations, discursively written, which are (probably) intended more to provoke his readers than to comfort them. Le Clézio seems to have been motivated to write this essay not just taking ideas from other writers, but also to explain his own research and also to relate his very own perspective on life. The essay is emotionally written.

== Principles ==
This is a collection of essays which explicitly theorize many of the principles Le Clézio himself wrote in Terra Amata. Le Clezio expresses his fondness for small things in these essays.

== Themes in L'extase materielle ==
- Le Clézio meditates about his bedroom
- Le Clézio writes about the woman
  - (and about the woman's body)
- Le Clézio writes of love,
  - (even of a fly or a spider)
- Le Clézio discourses on writing
- Le Clézio`writes about death
- Le Clézio gives some ideas of what he thinks "an absolute" (of anything) could be

== Publication history ==
=== First French Edition ===
- Le Clézio, J M G (1967). L'extase matérielle (in French). Paris: Gallimard. p. 229. ISBN 978-2-07-032745-4.Re-Printed 1971OCLC 82053973

=== Second French Edition ===
- Le Clézio, J M G (1993). L'extase matérielle : essai (in French). Mayenne: Impr. Floch. p. 313. ISBN 978-2-07-023824-8.

=== Third French Edition ===
- Le Clézio, J M G (2008). L'Extase Materielle (Nobel Prize Literature 2008) (in French). Mayenne: Impr. Floch. p. 221. ISBN 978-0-7859-2838-6.
