= Alma (Le Clézio novel) =

2017 novel by Jean-Marie Gustave Le Clézio

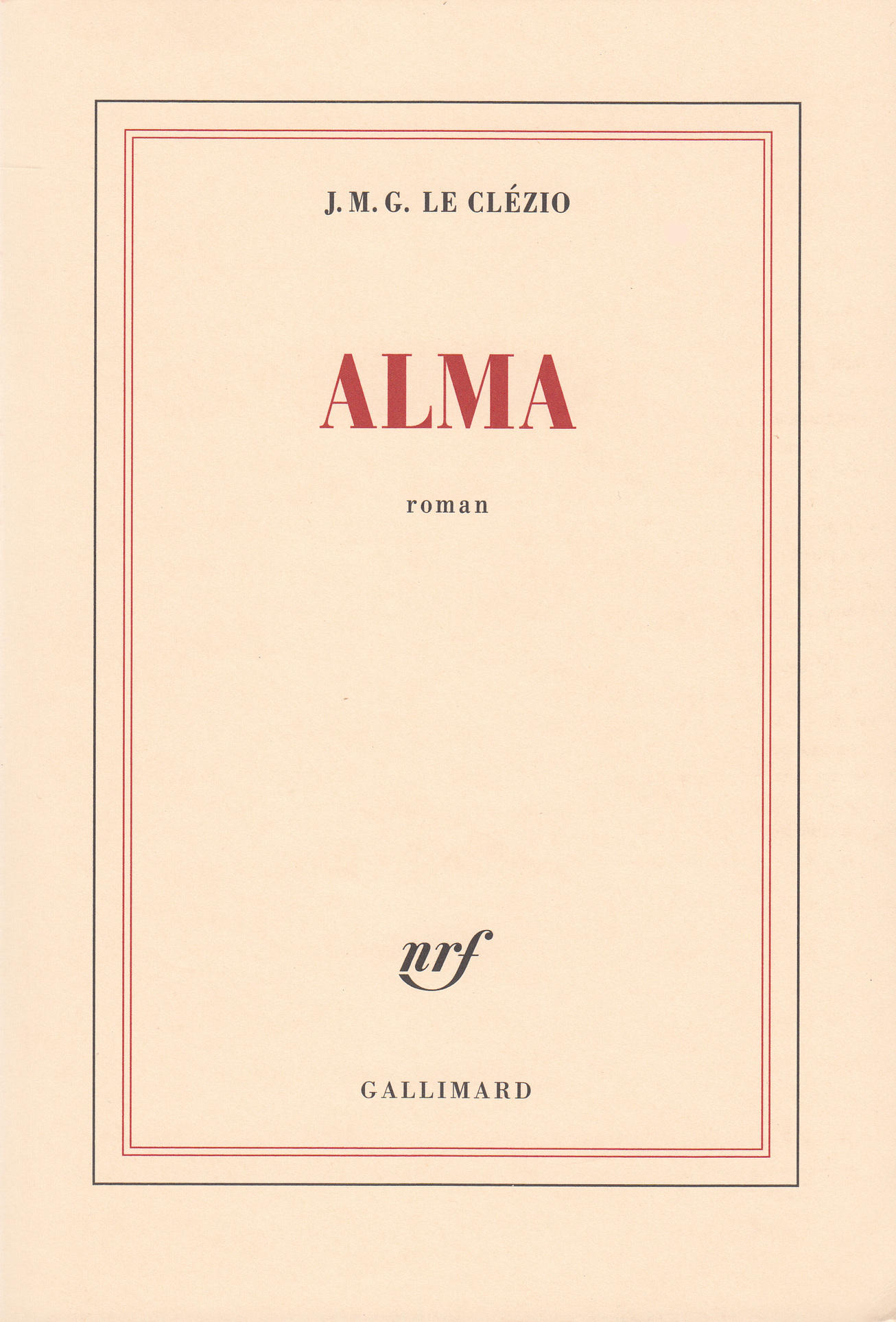
- Collection Blanche cover (first edition)
- Language: French
- Series: Collection Blanche
- Genre: novel
- Publisher: Éditions Gallimard
- Publication date: 2017
- ISBN: 978-2-07-274646-8

Alma is a 2017 novel authored by J. M. G. Le Clézio. The French narrator, Jérémie Felsen, travels to Mauritius to investigate his family's ties to slavery and explore the long-extinct dodo bird. The narration switches between Jérémie and Dominique Felsen (also called Dodo), a poor and sick Mauritian.
