= La Quarantaine =

La Quarantaine may refer to:

- La Quarantaine (novel), a novel by J. M. G. Le Clézio
- Karantina or La Quarantaine, a neighborhood in north-eastern Beirut
- Beyond Forty (original French title La Quarantaine), a 1982 Canadian drama film by Anne Claire Poirier
