= Terra Amata =

Terra Amata may refer to:

- Terra Amata (archaeological site), an archeological site in open air located on the slopes of Mount Boron in Nice, France
- Terra Amata (novel), a 1967 novel by French Nobel laureate J. M. G. Le Clézio
- Terra Amata, a fictional planet in the Dungeon (comics) series of satirical fantasy comic books
