= Tabataba suivi de pawana =

- First edition
- Author: J. M. G. Le Clézio ("Tabataba" was written by Bernard-Marie Koltès and Hector Poullet)
- Original title: Tabataba suivi de pawana
- Language: French
- Genre: Anthology
- Publisher: Ibis rouge éditions
- Publication place: France
- Pages: pages

Tabataba suivi de pawana is the title of a book containing two short stories "Tabataba" followed by "Pawana". "Pawana" was written by the French Nobel laureate J. M. G. Le Clézio, while "Tabataba" was written by Bernard-Marie Koltès and Hector Poullet.

== Plot summary ==
Hector Poullet says that even if we choose the Creole expressions which are basically from Creole of the archipelago of Guadeloupe, we do not always find the right translation in other varieties of Creole.[Other territories such as]:

- Martinique
- Guyana
- Dominica
- St. Lucia

have their own creole languages which each have their own words that need to be drawn into the story to help retelling.

== Theater ==
"Tabataba" was originally written for the stage by Bernard-Marie Koltès and was published by Koltes Edicion Conmemorativa, 1996.
OCLC 63550458

== Publication history ==
- Le Clézio, J. M. G. Tabataba suivi de pawana (in French). Photographs by Daniel Goudrouffe and Jean-François Manicom. Ibis rouge éditions.
