= J. M. G. Le Clézio =

French writer and professor (born 1940)

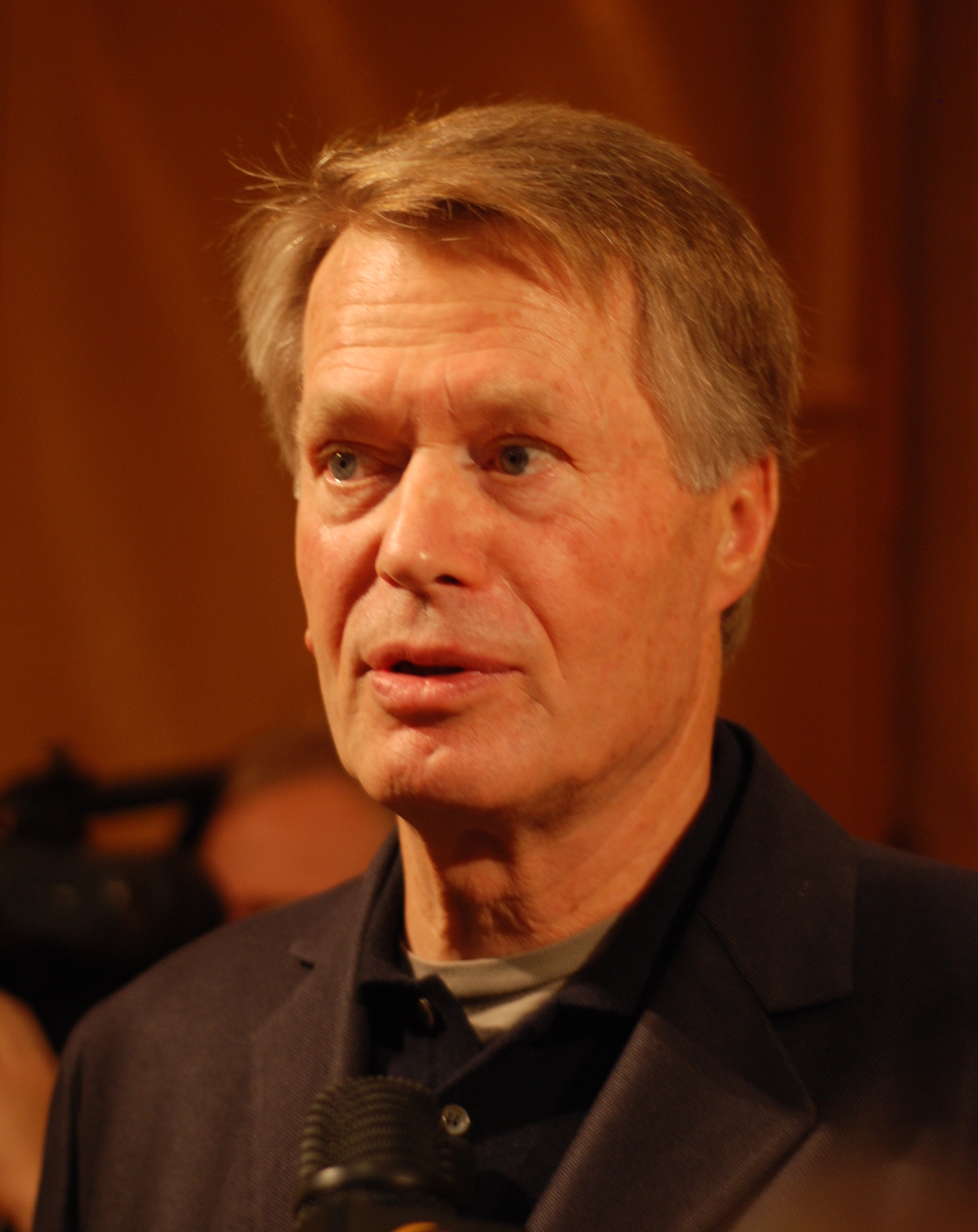
- Le Clézio in 2008
- Born: Jean-Marie Gustave Le Clézio; 13 April 1940 (age 86); Nice, France
- Occupation: Writer
- Writing career
- Period: 1963–present
- Genres: Novel; short story; essay; translation
- Subjects: Exile; migration; childhood; ecology
- Notable works: The Interrogation; Desert
- Notable awards: Nobel Prize in Literature (2008)

Jean-Marie Gustave Le Clézio (French: [ʒɑ̃ maʁi ɡystav lə klezjo]; born 13 April 1940), usually identified as J. M. G. Le Clézio, is a writer and professor who holds both French and Mauritian nationality. The author of over forty works, he was awarded the 1963 Prix Renaudot for his novel The Interrogation and the 2008 Nobel Prize in Literature for his life's work, as an "author of new departures, poetic adventure and sensual ecstasy, explorer of a humanity beyond and below the reigning civilization".

== Biography ==
Le Clézio's mother was born in the French Riviera city of Nice, his father on the island of British Mauritius (which was a British possession, but his father was ethnically Breton, in France). Both his father's and his mother's ancestors were originally from Morbihan, on the south coast of Brittany. His paternal ancestor François Alexis Le Clézio fled France in 1798 and settled with his wife and daughter on Mauritius, which was then a French colony but would soon pass into British hands. The colonists were allowed to maintain their customs and use the French language. Le Clézio has never lived in Mauritius for more than a few months at a time, but he has stated that he regards himself both as a Frenchman and a Mauritian. He has dual French and Mauritian citizenship (Mauritius gained independence in 1968) and calls Mauritius his "little fatherland".

Le Clézio was born in Nice, his mother's native city, during World War II when his father was serving in the British Army in Nigeria. He was raised in Roquebillière, a small village near Nice until 1948 when he, his mother, and his brother boarded a ship to join his father in Nigeria. His 1991 novel Onitsha is partly autobiographical. In a 2004 essay, he reminisced about his childhood in Nigeria and his relationship with his parents.

After studying at the University of Bristol in England from 1958 to 1959, Le Clézio finished his undergraduate degree at Nice's Institut d'études littéraires. In 1964 Le Clézio earned a master's degree from the University of Provence with a thesis on Henri Michaux and the mystical experience.

After several years spent in London and Bristol, Le Clézio moved to the United States to work as a teacher. In 1967 he served as an aid worker in Thailand as part of his national service, but was quickly expelled from the country for protesting against child prostitution and sent to Mexico to finish his national service. From 1970 to 1974, he lived with the Embera-Wounaan tribe in Panama. He has been married since 1975 to Jémia Jean, who is Moroccan, and has three daughters (one by his first marriage with Rosalie Piquemal). Since the 1990s they have divided their residence between Albuquerque, Mauritius, and Nice.

In 1983 Le Clézio wrote a doctoral thesis on colonial Mexican history for the University of Perpignan, on the conquest of the Purépecha people who inhabit the present-day state of Michoacán. It was serialized in a French magazine and published in Spanish in 1985.

Le Clézio has taught at a number of universities around the world. A frequent visitor to South Korea, he taught French language and literature at Ewha Womans University in Seoul during the 2007 academic year. In November 2013, Le Clézio joined Nanjing University in China as a professor.

== Literary career ==
Le Clézio began writing at the age of seven; his first work was a book about the sea. He achieved success at the age of 23, when his first novel, The Interrogation (Le Procès-Verbal), was the Prix Renaudot and was shortlisted for the Prix Goncourt. Since then he has published more than thirty-six books, including short stories, novels, essays, two translations on the subject of Native American mythology, and several children's books.

From 1963 to 1975, Le Clézio explored themes such as insanity, language, nature, and writing. He devoted himself to formal experimentation in the wake of such contemporaries as Georges Perec or Michel Butor. His persona was that of an innovator and a rebel, for which he was praised by Michel Foucault and Gilles Deleuze.

During the late 1970s, Le Clézio's style changed drastically; he abandoned experimentation, and the mood of his novels became less tormented as he used themes like childhood, adolescence, and travelling, which attracted a broader audience. In 1980, Le Clézio was the first winner of the newly created Grand Prix Paul Morand, awarded by the Académie Française, for his novel Desert (Désert). In 1994, a survey conducted by the French literary magazine Lire showed that 13 per cent of the readers considered him to be the greatest living French-language writer. His works have been translated to over 30 different languages.

== Nobel Prize ==
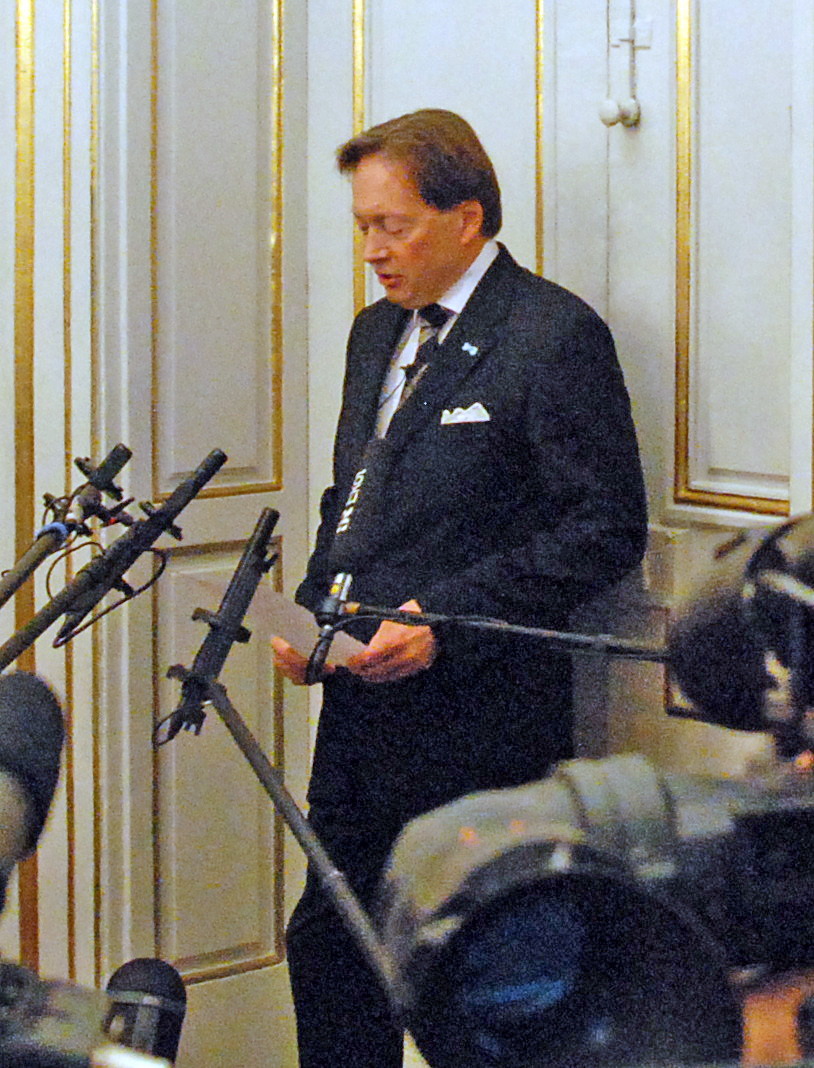
Horace Engdahl announces Le Clézio winning the Nobel Prize for Literature on 9 October 2008

The Nobel Prize in Literature for 2008 went to Le Clézio for works characterized by the Swedish Academy as being "poetic adventure and sensual ecstasy" and for being focused on the environment, especially the desert. The Swedish Academy, in announcing the award, called Le Clézio an "author of new departures, poetic adventure and sensual ecstasy, explorer of a humanity beyond and below the reigning civilization." Le Clézio used his Nobel prize acceptance lecture to attack the subject of information poverty. The title of his lecture was Dans la forêt des paradoxes ("In the forest of paradoxes"), a title he attributed to Stig Dagerman.

Gao Xingjian, a Chinese émigré writing in Mandarin, was the previous French citizen to receive the prize (for 2000); Le Clézio was the first French-language writer to receive the Nobel Prize in Literature since Claude Simon for 1985, and the fourteenth since Sully Prudhomme, laureate of the first prize of 1901.

== Controversy ==
Le Clézio is a staunch defender of Mama Rosa, director of a Mexican shelter raided by the police in July 2014 when children were found eating rotten food and kept against the will of their parents. He wrote an article in Le Monde arguing that she is close to sanctity.

== Bibliography ==
=== Novels ===
- Le Procès-verbal (1963). The Interrogation, trans. Daphne Woodward (1964).
- Le Déluge (1966). The Flood, trans. Peter Green (1967).
- Terra Amata (1967). Terra Amata, trans. Barbara Bray (1967).
- Le Livre des fuites (1969). The Book of Flights, trans. Simon Watson-Taylor (1971).
- La Guerre (1970). War, trans. Simon Watson-Taylor (1973).
- Les Géants (1973). The Giants, trans. Simon Watson-Taylor (1975).
- Voyages de l'autre côté (1975).
- Désert (1980). Desert, trans. C. Dickson (2009).
- Le Chercheur d'or (1985). The Prospector, trans. Carol Marks (1993); C. Dickson (2016).
- Onitsha (1991). Onitsha, trans. Alison Anderson (1997).
- Étoile errante (1992). Wandering Star, trans. C. Dickson (2005).
- La Quarantaine (1995).
- Poisson d'or (1997).
- Révolutions (2003).
- Ourania (2006).
- Ritournelle de la faim (2008).
- Alma (2017).

=== Short stories and novellas ===
- Le Jour où Beaumont fit connaissance avec sa douleur (1964). The Day Beaumont Became Acquainted with His Pain.
- La Fièvre (1965). Fever, trans. Daphne Woodward (1966)
- Mondo et autres histoires (1978). Mondo and Other Stories, trans. Alison Anderson (2011).
- La Ronde et autres faits divers (1982). The Round & Other Cold Hard Facts, trans. C. Dickson (2002).
- Printemps et autres saisons (1989)
- Awaité Pawana (1992). Pawana, trans. Christophe Brunski (2008).
- La Fête chantée et autres essais de thème amérindien (1997)
- Hasard suivi d'Angoli Mala (1999)
- Cœur brûle et autres romances (2000)
- Fantômes dans la rue (2000). Ghosts in the Street.
- Tabataba suivi de Pawana (2002)
- Histoire du pied et autres fantaisies (2011)
- Tempête : deux novellas (2014). Storm.
- Chanson bretonne, suivi de L'Enfant et la Guerre (2020)
- Avers (2023). On the Wrong Side, trans. Teresa Lavender Fagan (Seagull Books, 2024)

=== Non-fiction ===
- Le Rêve mexicain ou La Pensée interrompue (1965). The Mexican Dream, Or, The Interrupted Thought of Amerindian Civilizations, trans. Teresa Lavender Fagan (1993).
- "Sur la lecture comme le vrai voyage" (1965). "On Reading as True Travel", trans. Julia Abramson.
- "La Liberté pour rêver" (1965). "Freedom to Dream", trans. Ralph Schoolcraft.
- "La Liberté pour parler" (1965). "Freedom to Speak", trans. Le Clézio.
- L'extase matérielle (1967). Material Ecstasy.
- Conversations avec J. M. G. Le Clézio (1971)
- Haï (1971)
- Mydriase (1973). Mydriasis, trans. Teresa Lavender Fagan, published in Mydriasis: Followed by “To the Icebergs” (2019).
- Vers les icebergs (1978). To the Icebergs, trans. Teresa Lavender Fagan, published in Mydriasis: Followed by “To the Icebergs” (2019).
- L'Inconnu sur la Terre (1978)
- Trois Villes saintes (1980)
- Une lettre de J. M. G. Le Clézio (1982)
- Sur Lautréamont (1987)
- Diego et Frida (1993)
- Ailleurs (1995)
- Dans la maison d'Edith (1997)
- Enfances (1998)
- L'Enfant de sous le pont (2000)
- L'Africain (2004). The African, trans. C. Dickson (2013).
- Ballaciner (2007)
- Chanson bretonne suivi de L'Enfant et la guerre (2020)
- Identité nomade (2024)

=== Travel diaries ===
- Voyage à Rodrigues
- Gens des nuages
- Raga. Approche du continent invisible

=== Collections translated by the author into French ===
- Les Prophéties du Chilam Balam
- Relation de Michoacan
- Sirandanes

=== Books for children ===
- Voyage au pays des arbres (1978)
- Lullaby (1980). From Mondo et autres histoires.
- Peuple du ciel, suivi de Les Bergers (1981). Both from Mondo et autres histoires.
- Celui qui n'avait jamais vu la mer, suivi de La Montagne du dieu vivant (1982). Both from Mondo et autres histoires.
- Villa Aurore, suivi de Orlamonde (1985)
- Balaabilou (1985). Extracts from Désert.
- La Grande Vie, suivi de Peuple du ciel (1990). "La Grande Vie" from La Ronde et autres faits divers.

=== Books written by other authors with preface written by Le Clézio ===
- The French-language preface to Juan Rulfo's short story collection Le Llano en Flammes
- Preface to French filmmaker Robert Bresson's "Notes Sur Le Cinématographe"

== Awards and honors ==
=== Awards ===
Year	Prize	Work
1963	prix Théophraste-Renaudot	The Interrogation
1972	prix littéraire Valery-Larbaud	For his complete works
1980	Grand prix de littérature Paul-Morand, awarded by the Académie française
1997	Jean Giono Prize	Poisson d'or
1998	prix Prince-de-Monaco	For his complete works and upon publication of Poisson d'or
2008	Stig Dagermanpriset	for his complete works and upon publication of Swedish translation of a travelogue Raga. Approche du continent invisible
2008	Nobel Prize in Literature

=== Honours ===
- He was made Chevalier (Knight) of the Légion d'honneur on 25 October 1991 and was promoted to Officier (Officer) in 2009
- In 1996, he was made Officier (Officer) of the Ordre national du Mérite.
- Lycée Français J. M. G. Le Clézio in Port Vila, Vanuatu is named after him.
