= The Book of Flights =

1969 novel by J. M. G. Le Clézio

The Book of Flights: An Adventure Story
- First English edition
- Author: J. M. G. Le Clézio
- Original title: Le Livre des fuites
- Translator: Simon Watson Taylor
- Language: French
- Publisher: Gallimard, Le Chemin; Jonathan Cape (UK)
- Publication date: 1969
- Publication place: France
- English publication date: 1971
- Pages: 284 pages
- ISBN: 2-07-071820-4
- OCLC: 315762105

The Book of Flights: An Adventure Story (French: Le Livre des fuites) is a 1969 novel by French Nobel laureate writer J. M. G. Le Clézio. The English translation by Simon Watson Taylor was published in 1971. The novel concerns the real and imaginary journeys of its hero, Young Man Hogan.

Many of Le Clézio's books were out of print in English when he won the Nobel Prize. The English translations began to be reissued shortly afterwards, including this one.

It belongs to Le Clézio's more experimental phase, together with works such as Terra Amata and Les Géants, "hyper-realistic tales dominated by the fundamental war between cities and nature, between mankind and mythology". In these novels, he developed "a highly original brand of the plotless, characterless novel".

== Publication history ==
=== First French edition ===
- Le Clézio, J. M. G. (1969). Le Livre des fuites Sub-Title "roman d'aventures"." (in French). Paris: Gallimard, Le Chemin. p. 284. ISBN 2-07-071820-4.

=== First English edition, London ===
- Le Clézio, J. M. G; Stanley Chapman (cover illustrator) (1971). The Book of Flights: An Adventure Story. Simon Watson Taylor (trans.). Cape. ISBN 0-224-00583-9.

=== First English edition, New York ===
- Le Clézio, J. M. G.; Stanley Chapman (cover illustrator) (1972). The Book of Flights: An Adventure Story. Translated by Translated by Simon Watson Taylor. New York: Atheneum- Argo. p. 319. ISBN 0-224-00583-9.

=== Second English edition ===
- Le Clézio, J. M. G. (2008). Book of Flights. Simon Watson Taylor (trans.). United Kingdom: Vintage. p. 336. ISBN 978-0-09-953047-3.
