= Une lettre de J. M. G. Le Clézio =

2006 essay by Jean-Marie Gustave Le Clézio

Une lettre de J.M.G. Le Clezio
- Author: J. M. G. Le Clézio
- Language: French
- Genre: Essay
- Publisher: Revue des Deux Mondes, Paris, no.7
- Publication date: 2006
- Publication place: France
- Pages: 75–77 pp

"Une lettre de J. M. G. Le Clezio" is an essay written by French Nobel laureate J. M. G. Le Clézio.

== Revue des Deux Mondes ==
Une lettre de J. M. G. Le Clezio" (2006-05-30) was first published by Revue des Deux Mondes, Paris ( issue no.7) on pages 75–77
ISSN 0750-9278.

== Subject ==
The letter Le Clézio wrote in response to a letter by Michel Crépu referring to Finnegans Wake has the subject line :"VOYAGER, MEDITER" in French which would translate into English as being "to travel and to carefully consider" or "meditate".

== Publication history ==
- REVUE DES DEUX MONDES, no. 7/8, (2006): 75–77; British Library Serials: BL Shelfmark: 7898.300000 ISSN 0750-9278 OCLC 198190791
