= Ourania (novel) =

2006 novel by J. M. G. Le Clézio

- 2007 Gallimard 'Folio' edition
- Author: J. M. G. Le Clézio
- Original title: Ourania
- Language: French
- Genre: Novel
- Publisher: Gallimard, collection “Blanche” and “Folio”
- Publication date: 2006
- Publication place: France
- Pages: 297
- ISBN: 978-2-07-077703-7
- OCLC: 63693191
- LC Class: PQ2672.E25 O87 2006

Ourania is a 2006 novel written in French by French Nobel laureate J. M. G. Le Clézio.

== Plot summary ==
Le Clézio lived for fifteen years in a small village in Mexico called Valle de Bravo. Children invented an imaginary country and ideal, Ourania, and this book describes a near-Utopian society in Mexico. Two types of Utopias are compared to each other: a modest Utopia from the Jesuits and the other an ideal city called Santa Fe de la Laguna. The book mentions the transhumant movement Rainbows (1970–1980) and the Salvadoran revolution and its leader, Monsignor Romero. Failure was inevitable. Dreams are necessary, even if reality isn't.

== Subject ==
"Le Clézio’s new novel, Ourania, is partly set in a Utopian community on the Pacific coast of Mexico. The “republic” of Campos was set up in the 1980s in an abandoned Jesuit seminary. We learn about it through one of its inhabitants, Raphael, a sixteen-year-old Inuit and the son of an alcoholic father; the children don’t attend formal school: instead, they spend mornings working the land and afternoons in study and “dialogue”; they receive sex education, without being encouraged to practise it themselves; organized religion is frowned on and the exchange of money forbidden. Many of the children in Campos have been abandoned by their parents."

== Awards ==
The book won the “annual best foreign novels in 21st century” by the People’s Literature Publishing House (PLPH) January 28, 2007.

== Publication history ==
- Le Clézio, J. M. G (2006). Ourania (in French). Paris: Gallimard, collection "Blanche" and "Folio". p. 297. ISBN 978-2-07-077703-7.
- Le Clézio, J. M. G (2008). Urania (in Spanish). Buenos Aires: El Cuenco de Plata. p. 272. ISBN 978-987-1228-37-9.
- Le Clézio, J. M. G. (2008). Urania (in Polish). Warsaw: Państwowy Instytut Wydawniczy. p. 240. ISBN 978-83-06-03171-3.
