= The Giants (novel) =

1973 novel written by J. M. G. Le Clézio

- 1973 Gallimard edition
- Author: J. M. G. Le Clézio
- Original title: Les Géants
- Translator: Simon Watson Taylor
- Language: French
- Publisher: Gallimard, Le Chemin
- Publication date: 1973
- Publication place: France
- Pages: 320
- ISBN: 978-2-07-028426-9
- OCLC: 248116678

The Giants (French: Les Géants) is a novel written in French by French Nobel laureate J. M. G. Le Clézio. The English translation was published by Atheneum and Jonathan Cape.

== Publication history ==
=== First French edition ===
Le Clézio, J. M. G (1973-04-13). Les Géants (in French). Paris: Gallimard. p. 320. ISBN 978-2-07-028426-9. OCLC 67479560.

=== Second French edition ===
Le Clézio, J. M. G (1973). Les Géants (in French). Paris: Gallimard, LE CHEMIN. p. 320. ISBN 978-2-07-028426-9.

=== First English translation: U.S. edition ===
Le Clézio, J. M. G (1973). The Giants. Translated by Simon Watson Taylor. New York: Atheneum. ISBN 978-0-689-10661-3.

=== First English translation: UK edition ===
Le Clézio, J. M. G (1973). The Giants. Translated by Simon Watson Taylor. London: Cape. ISBN 9780224011518. OCLC 150450426.
