= Diego et Frida =

1993 biography by J. M. G. Le Clézio

- First edition
- Author: J. M. G. Le Clézio
- Cover artist: Frida Kahlo, Frieda and Diego Rivera - 1931
- Language: French
- Series: Échanges
- Genre: Biography
- Publisher: Éditions Stock
- Publication date: 1993
- Publication place: France
- Pages: 237
- ISBN: 978-2-234-02617-9
- OCLC: 29553840
- Dewey Decimal: 759.972 B 20
- LC Class: ND259.R5 L4 1993

Diego et Frida is a biography of Mexican painters Diego Rivera and Frida Kahlo by French Nobel laureate J. M. G. Le Clézio. It was originally published in French in 1993.

Diego et Frida occupies a special place in Le Clézio's creative output: it is the only story that the writer devotes completely to artists.

The cover art includes Kahlo's 1931 painting Frieda and Diego Rivera.
