= Conversations avec J. M. G. Le Clézio =

1971 book by Jean-Marie Gustave Le Clézio

"Conversations with J.M.G. Le Clézio"
- First edition
- Author: J. M. G. Le Clézio
- Original title: Conversations avec J.M.G. Le Clézio
- Language: French
- Subject: Interviews with the author
- Genre: nonfiction
- Publisher: Mercure de France, Paris
- Publication date: 1971 (1st edition)
- Publication place: France
- Pages: 126 pages
- OCLC: 498529

Conversations avec J. M. G. Le Clézio are the written dialogues in French of Pierre Lhoste interviewing French novelist and 2008 Nobel Prize in Literature recipient J. M. G. Le Clézio on August 30 and September 2, 1969, and from January 11 until January 16, 1971. The introduction was written by J. M. G. Le Clézio. In the book, Le Clézio is interviewed about "what makes a writer: the city, solitude, passers-by, fear".

== Publication history ==
- Le Clézio, J.M.G.; Pierre Lhoste (1971). Conversations avec J.M.G. Le Clézio (in French). Paris: Mecure de France. OCLC 498529. At head of title: Pierre Lhoste. "Entretiens ... diffusés sur la chaîne de France-Culture les 30 août et 2 septembre 1969 et du 11 au 16 janvier 1971."

== Reviews ==
- Walt, J. (Winter 1973). "Review of Conversations avec J. M. G. Le Clézio". Books Abroad. 47 (1): 111. doi:10.2307/40126796. JSTOR 40126796.
- L. B. (November 1971). "Review of Conversations avec J. M. G. Le Clézio". Revue des Deux Mondes: 510. JSTOR 44600413.
- "Learning from the Indians". The Times Literary Supplement (3638): 1442. November 19, 1971 – via Gale.
