= Fantômes dans la rue =

Book by Jean-Marie Gustave Le Clézio

- First separate publication
- Author: J. M. G. Le Clézio
- Original title: Fantômes dans la rue
- Language: French
- Genre: Novella
- Publisher: Elle, Aubin Imprimeur
- Publication date: 2000
- Publication place: France
- Media type: Print
- Pages: 48

Fantômes dans la rue (Ghosts in the Street) is the title of a novella written in French by French Nobel laureate writer J. M. G. Le Clézio. His daughter Amy Le Clézio suggested the storyline to this novella. It was first published in the French language magazine Elle, n° 2845 dated 10 July 2000.

== Extract ==
Renault ne mendie pas.
Renault was not just in need of charity
Il reste simplement assis en tailleur, les mains posées sur ses cuisses, le buste bien droit, le regard fixé devant lui, légèrement à gauche.
He stayed there, legs crossed, hands on the thighs, but his torso was uprightand his eyes gazed sometimes straight ahead and sometimes a little to the left of him.
Il ne s'occupe pas des voitures ni des gens.
He was not thinking about either cars nor people.
Mais il n'est pas indifférent non plus.
Neither was he indifferent .
De temps en temps, il relève ses yeux, et son regard va droit vers quelqu'un, au hasard.
From time to time, almost at random, his eyes stopped gazing in any one direction but stared at someone (just anybody, really).
C'est évident qu'il n'attend personne.
Obviously he wasn't waiting for anybody Quand la jeune fille est venue, il l'a regardée, et elle lui a souri gentiment.
When the young girl came, he looked at her and she smiled nicely at him
Elle s'est arrêtée à sa hauteur, et il lui a dit une phrase, peut-être dans le genre de « ne t'inquiète pas, tu trouveras ce que tu cherches », pas très sibylline, pourtant surprenante...'
She stopped in front of him he said one sentence, perhaps something like "don't worry, you will find what you are looking for"; it was not very cryptic, but it was surprising...

== Publication history ==
=== First French edition ===
- Le Clézio, J. M. G (2000). Fantômes dans la rue (in French). Poitiers: Elle, Aubin Imprimeur. p. 48.
