= Cœur brûle et autres romances =

- 2000 Le Grand livre du mois edition
- Author: J. M. G. Le Clézio
- Original title: Cœur brûle et autres romances
- Language: French
- Genre: Short story collection
- Publisher: Gallimard
- Publication date: 2000
- Publication place: France
- Pages: 187
- ISBN: 978-2-07-075980-4
- OCLC: 45208427
- Dewey Decimal: 843/.914 22
- LC Class: PQ2672.E25 C58 2000

Cœur brûle et autres romances is the title of a collection of short stories written in French by French Nobel laureate J. M. G. Le Clézio.

== Interview with Le Clézio ==
In an interview conducted by Tirthankar Chanda with Le Clézio, Chanda asks whether since Cœur brûlé et autres romances is partly set in Mexico, could it be said that the two sisters are victims of a nomadic life?
Le Clézio answered that these two sisters "are victims of having belonged to two different cultures at the same time. It is very difficult for children to relate to two cultures as different as Mexican culture, which is more of an immediate, street, outside culture, and European culture which is based on the home, the indoors and school rules. It was the clash of cultures that I wanted to recount".
Chanda then asked "So why a "romance"? to which Le Clézio replied "This was a slightly ironic word to describe some tragic situations. The book consists of seven dark short stories."
Le Clézio continued by saying that "in romantic fiction, feeling takes precedence over sociological truth. I think that the role of fiction is to highlight this constant slippage between emotion and the social, real, world. On the other hand, all the stories in this collection are based on actual events that I have adapted. So they are true stories. They have an element of the 'sentimentality' that you also find in the 'News in Brief' pages of the newspapers".

== Seven short stories ==
The book consists of seven dark short stories

- Coeur brûle
- Chercher l'aventure
- Hôtel de la Solitude
- Trois aventurières
- Kalima
- Vent du Sud
- Trésor

== Critical reception ==
According to Allen Thiher in his review of Coeur brule et autres romances this collection is a mixed affair .The review can be read online :

== Publication history ==
=== First French edition ===
- Le Clézio, J. M. G (2000). Cœur brûle et autres romances (in French). Paris: Gallimard. pp. 187. ISBN 978-2-07-075980-4.

=== Second French edition ===
- Le Clézio, J. M. G (2002). Cœur brûle et autres romances =the burned Heart and other Romances (in French). Paris: Gallimard Education. p. 187. ISBN 978-2-07-042334-7.

=== Third French edition ===
- Le Clézio, J. M. G (June 2002). Cœur brûle et autres romances =the burned Heart and other Romances (in French). Skokie, Illinois, US: Distribooks, Inc. pp. 188. ISBN 978-2-07-075980-4.

=== Fourth French edition ===
- Le Clézio, J. M. G (2008). Coeur brûle et autres romances (in French). Paris: Gallimard. p. 187. OCLC 288960346.
