= Freedom to Dream and Freedom to Speak =

"Freedom to Dream" and "Freedom to Speak"
- Author: J. M. G. Le Clézio
- Original title: "La liberté pour Rêver" and "La liberté pour parler"
- Translator: Ralph Schoolcraft III
- Language: French translated into English
- Genre: Essay
- Publisher: World Literature Today, University of Oklahoma
- Publication date: 1965
- Publication place: France

"La liberté pour Rêver" and "La liberté pour parler" are essays written in French by French Nobel laureate J. M. G. Le Clézio and translated into English as "Freedom to Dream" and "Freedom to Speak" and published by World Literature Today.
