= Sur Lautréamont =

1987 essay written by French Nobel laureate J. M. G. Le Clézio

- 1999 edition
- Author: Maurice Blanchot; Julien Gracq; J. M. G. Le Clézio
- Language: French
- Genre: Essay
- Publisher: Éditions Complexe, Collection "Le Regard littéraire", Brussels
- Publication date: 1 October 1987
- Publication place: France
- Pages: 133 pp
- ISBN: 978-2-87027-216-9
- OCLC: 18656145
- Dewey Decimal: 841/.8 20
- LC Class: PQ2220.D723 C5823 1987

"Sur Lautréamont" is an essay written by French Nobel laureate J. M. G. Le Clézio.

== Interview with Jean-Marie Le Clézio ==
Quote: "... this unconventional novelist claims to draw his inspiration not only from Lautréamont and Zola, but from Stevenson and Joyce as well. ..."

== Publication history ==
- Le Clézio, J -M G; Maurice Blanchot; Julien Gracq (1987). Sur Lautréamont. Brussels Belgium: Éditions Complexe, Collection "Le Regard littéraire". pp. 133. ISBN 978-2-87027-216-9.

=== Les Cahiers du Chemin ===
Title	Year	Publisher	Length	Notes
"Sur Lautréamont."	1973	Les Cahiers du Chemin 17. 15.1.1973: 95–129		
