= Révolutions =

2003 novel by J. M. G. Le Clézio

- 2004 Gallimard 'Folio' edition
- Author: J. M. G. Le Clézio
- Original title: Révolutions
- Language: French
- Genre: Novel
- Publisher: Gallimard
- Publication date: 2003
- Publication place: France
- Pages: 554
- ISBN: 978-2-07-076853-0
- OCLC: 51666383
- Dewey Decimal: 843/.914 22
- LC Class: PQ2672.E25 R48 2003

Révolutions is a 2003 novel by French writer and Nobel laureate J. M. G. Le Clézio. No English translation has yet been published.

It is one of Le Clézio's Mauritius novels, and deals with both the history of violent upheaval on Mauritius and the protagonist's search for his family's origins there.

The protagonist, Jean, recounts a number of revolutionary episodes, including the Algerian War, the May 68 events in Paris, and the French Revolution. Jean's ancestor is forced to emigrate to Mauritius after the Battle of Valmy. The book alternates an account of that journey to Mauritius with the protagonist's account of his own medical studies in France and Britain. Also included are radio broadcasts detailing the numbers of dead and wounded in the Algerian War.
