= Trois Villes saintes =

- First edition
- Author: J. M. G. Le Clézio
- Original title: Trois Villes saintes
- Language: French
- Genre: Essay
- Publisher: Gallimard, Paris
- Publication date: 1980
- Publication place: France
- Media type: Print
- Pages: 81 pp
- ISBN: 978-2-07-021811-0
- OCLC: 434362045

"Trois Villes saintes" is an essay written by French Nobel laureate J. M. G. Le Clézio.

== Written in French ==
The title could be translated into English as "Three sacred townships"

== Subject ==
Men, three cities, Chancah, Tixcacal, Chun Pom, and the drought that attacks the freedom stifled by the silence of the gods who could speak and were silent. Employed by the Institute of Latin America in 1967, JMG Le is Clézio took deep passion for this region and for the Indians. This experience greatly impressed his work and changed his world view. For four years, from 1970 to 1974, he shared the lives of the Emberá speaking peoples in the heart of the Panamanian jungle.

== Publication history ==
=== Magazine ===
==== 1 ====
- Le Clézio, J. M. G. (1975). "Trois villes saintes". Nouvelle Revue Française (in French) (264, décembre): 1–15.

==== Fin ====
- Le Clézio, J. M. G. (1975). "Trois villes saintes". Nouvelle Revue Française (in French) (septembre): 7–33.

=== First French edition ===
- Le Clézio, Jean Marie Gustave (1980). Trois Villes saintes (in French). Paris: Gallimard. p. 81. ISBN 978-2-07-021811-0.
