= Printemps et autres saisons =

1989 novel by Jean-Marie Gustave Le Clézio

- Second edition (1992 Folio)
- Author: J. M. G. Le Clézio
- Original title: Printemps et autres saisons
- Language: French
- Genre: Short story collection
- Publisher: Gallimard
- Publication date: 1989
- Publication place: France
- Pages: 203 pp
- ISBN: 978-2-07-071364-6
- OCLC: 20229228

Printemps et autres saisons is the title of a collection of short stories written in French by French Nobel laureate J. M. G. Le Clézio .

== Contents ==
- Printemps
- Fascination
- Le temps ne passe pas
- Zinna
- La saison des pluies (which has been translated as "The Rainy Season") Excerpt online

== Reviews ==
Le Monde review: "Le Clézio, Printemps et autres saisons;Article repris sur Medium4You" (in French). Le Monde. 2008-11-07. Archived from the original on 2009-09-09.

The note is also available here.

== Publication history ==
=== First French Edition ===
- Le Clézio, J. M. G (1989). Printemps et autres saisons (in French). Paris: Gallimard Le Chemin. p. 203. ISBN 978-2-07-071364-6.

=== Second French Edition ===
- Le Clézio, J. M. G (1992). Printemps et autres saisons (in French). Paris: Gallimard Collection Folio. p. 249. ISBN 978-2-07-038377-1.

=== "La saison des pluies" ===
==== Nouvelle Revue Française ====
===== I =====
| Title | Year | Publisher | Length | Notes |
|---|---|---|---|---|
| "La saison des pluies"I. | 1989 | Nouvelle Revue Française 432, janvier: 1–11 | pages | |

===== Fin =====
| Title | Year | Publisher | Length | Notes |
|---|---|---|---|---|
| "La saison des pluies." fin | 1989 | Nouvelle Revue Française 433, février: 95–107 | pages | |
