= Haï =

1971 essay by J. M. G. Le Clézio

- First edition
- Author: J. M. G. Le Clézio
- Language: French
- Genre: Essay
- Publisher: Editions d'art Albert Skira, Les Sentiers de la création, Geneva
- Publication date: 1971
- Publication place: France
- Media type: Print
- Pages: 170
- ISBN: 978-2-605-00112-5
- OCLC: 246772402
- LC Class: F1565.3.P45 C54 1987

"Haï" is an essay written by French Nobel laureate J. M. G. Le Clézio.

== Subject ==
Recurrent images are the sun and the sea, light and water. From 1969 to 1973 Le Clézio lived among the Emberá speaking Indians in Panama.

== Quote ==
"But " for the Indian, music has no beginning, no end, no climax

=== Explanation of "Haï" ===
Haï could br translated from French into English as Chai. Chai is a symbol and word that figures prominently in Jewish culture and consists of the letters of the Hebrew alphabet Het (ח) and Yod (י)

== Publication history ==
=== First ===
- Haï. Geneva, Switzerland: Editions d'art Albert Skira, Les Sentiers de la création. 1971. ISBN 978-2-605-00112-5.

1971, France, Editions d'art Albert Skira, Les Sentiers de la création, Geneva
ISBN 978-2-605-00112-5

=== Reprint ===
It was reprinted by Flammarion, Paris in 1987.
