= To the Icebergs (Essay on Henri Michaux) =

1978 essay by J.M.G. Le Clézio

- Author: J. M. G. Le Clézio co-written by Henri Michaux
- Original title: Vers les icebergs (Essai sur Henri Michaux)
- Language: French
- Genre: Essay
- Publisher: Fata Morgana, Montpellier
- Publication date: 1978
- Publication place: France
- Pages: 52
- ISBN: 978-2-85194-059-9
- OCLC: 15901405

"Vers les icebergs (Essai sur Henri Michaux)" is an essay by J. M. G. Le Clézio on Henri Michaux.

Vers les icebergs could well be translated into English as To the Icebergs (Essay on Henri Michaux) according to France.com.

== Henri Michaux ==
Henri Michaux was a highly idiosyncratic Belgian poet writer and painter who wrote in the French language. Michaux is best known for his esoteric books written in a highly accessible style, and his body of work includes poetry travelogues, and art criticism. Michaux travelled widely, tried his hand at several careers, and experimented with drugs, the latter resulting in two of his most intriguing works, Miserable Miracle and The Major Ordeals of the Mind and the Countless Minor Ones. Vers les icebergs is an essay on the author of

- Misérable miracle; it was translated by Louise Varèse into English with the title Miserable Miracle: Mescaline

and

- Les Grandes Épreuves de l'esprit et les innombrables petites; it was translated by Richard Howard as The Major Ordeals of the Mind and the Countless Minor Ones

== Publication history ==
- Le Clézio, J. M. G.; Henri Michaux (1985). Vers les icebergs [Essai sur Henri Michaux] (in French). Montpellier: Fata Morgana. p. 65. ISBN 978-2-85194-059-9., first French edition
