= Gens des nuages =

1997 book

- 1997 French edition
- Author: Jean-Marie Gustave Le Clézio and Jémia Le Clézio
- Original title: Gens des nuages
- Language: French
- Subject: Travel
- Genre: Memoir
- Publisher: Stock
- Publication date: 1997
- Publication place: France
- Media type: Print
- Pages: 151 pp
- ISBN: 978-2-07-041216-7
- OCLC: 43901147

Gens des nuages is a travel journal written in French by the French Nobel laureate J. M. G. Le Clézio and his wife Jémia. Gens des nuages could be translated as meaning The Cloud People.

It was written during a trip to Sahara and published in 1997.

Jémia Le Clézio is a Sahrawi and her ancestors were nomads who lived in the desert area. After her grandmother left her country, she never visited the place before the trip.
