= The Prospector (novel) =

1985 novel by J. M. G. Le Clézio

- 1985 Folio edition
- Author: J. M. G. Le Clézio
- Original title: Le Chercheur d'or
- Translator: Carol Marks
- Language: French translated into English
- Genre: Novel
- Publisher: Gallimard, Folio;Paris; English translation: David R. Godine, Publisher
- Publication date: 1985
- Publication place: France
- English publication date: 1993
- Media type: Print
- Pages: 352
- ISBN: 978-0-87923-976-3
- OCLC: 28798401
- Dewey Decimal: 843/.914 20
- LC Class: PQ2672.E25 C4813 1993

The Prospector (French: Le Chercheur d'or) is a 1985 novel by French Nobel laureate writer J. M. G. Le Clézio. It was translated into English by Carol Marks and published by David R. Godine, Boston.

== Plot introduction ==
Alexis L'Estang becomes obsessed with finding the treasure of the legendary Unknown Corsair on the island of Rodrigues.

[The] protagonist [of The prospector] searches for buried treasure in an effort both to restore his family's fortunes and to reclaim his idyllic childhood; this second idyll is interrupted by World War I

— The New York Times notes Le Clézio's family had ties to Mauritius

For as long as I can remember, I heard the sea

— J. M. G. Le Clézio

The child recalls the sea around the island of Rodrigues in the Indian Ocean. The author situated the plot of this book in the village of Anse aux Anglais.

== Reviews ==
=== Taken from the Times Literary Supplement ===
The present tense seems to be more frequently employed by modern French novelists than by their British or American counterparts; but few contemporary writers can have resorted to it so consistently as Le Clézio. Concomitant with his absorption in a continuous present is an impulse to unrestrained extension.

Comme il est long, le temps de la mer! [Time measured by sea is so long!]

exclaims the narrator of his latest novel, the Mauritian Alexis L'Estang, resuming his obsessive search for pirate gold in the Indian Ocean on returning from service in the trenches of the First World War.
His story begins in 1892, when he is eight, and spans thirty years; yet despite the dates, the novel is in no sense a historical one, but could be most fittingly described as a fable.
Its characters are of quasi-archetypal simplicity, and they communicate in dialogue of taciturn breviloquence. Apart from the narrator's abiding but tenuous relationship with his sister Laure, the novel's principal human interest centres on his chastely erotic idyll with Ouma, the young native girl or "manaf" he finds on the island of Rodrigues, to which plans left him by his father have led him in search of a hoard of plundered gold concealed there by a legendary corsair.
Ouma is an archetype of the order of W. H. Hudson's Rima, or Rider Haggard's "Nada the Lily"
(referred to early in the book as the heroine of the favourite reading-matter of Alexis and his sister) David Gascoyne (The Times Literary Supplement of October 4, 1985)

=== From Publishers Weekly ===
Reed Business Information, Inc.

Le Clezio, who is best known for his Prix Renaudot-winning first novel, The Interrogation (1963), has created a gentle portrayal of a man haunted by visions of his ideal childhood. The round of seemingly endless summer seashore days and lessons at the knee of their mother, comes to an end for Alexis L'Etang and his sister Laure with their father's financial ruin and his death. The elder L'Etang's one legacy is an obsession with the treasure of the "Unknown Corsair," supposedly buried on Rodrigues Island. Determined to recapture their earlier prosperity, Alexis leaves for Rodrigues in 1910, where he is bewitched by the quest for the treasure, by the soothing routine of sunny days and by the love of a native girl, Ouma. Four years later his second idyll is interrupted by WW I and Alexis leaves the Indian Ocean for the very different geography of Ypres and the Somme. It is clear that Le Clezio, whose ancestor was a French corsair who settled on Mauritius, loves his setting—maybe too much. His writing is deeply evocative and descriptive even when simply furthering the plot, but many of his lengthy descriptions of Mauritius, Rodrigues and Alexis's ocean voyages between them are overwrought

=== Review of Contemporary Fiction ===
Susan Ireland wrote this (which was published in the "Review of Contemporary Fiction")

With its echoes of other famous quests, Alexis's search takes on mythical proportions and brings him face-to-face with the elemental forces of nature. The lyrical descriptions of the land and seascapes powerfully convey the entrancing rhythm of the waves that carry him on his journey and make The Prospector a novel of intense beauty

=== The Washington Post ===
Dominic Di Bernardi of The Washington Post wrote :

The Prospector offers a wonderful one-volume compendium of all the grand myths rooted in the European colonial experience, combining elements from Paul et Virginie, Robinson Crusoe, and Indiana Jones. Alexis, known as Ali, and his beloved sister, Laure, live in an Eden nestled on the island of Mauritius. A child drawn to nature, he is nevertheless most enthralled by his father's dreams of a privateer's treasure. Yet this same father's vision of bringing electricity to the island leads to the family's ruin (thanks to a ferocious hurricane, brilliantly described). To recover his family's paradise lost, the adult Ali embarks upon a hunt for the pirate's gold. "I left to put an end to the dream, in order that my life might begin. I am going to take this journey to its conclusion. I know that I will find something

== Translating J.M.G. Le Clézio ==
Alison Anderson published this piece in World Literature Today.S he is the translator of J. M. G. Le Clézio's 1991 novel Onitsha.

The paradox of every translator's life is that he or she must betray the thing most loved: the author's language, the author's work. When I first read Le chercheur d'or (Eng. The Prospector) some years ago, I was spellbound by the atmosphere which Le Clézio evokes. To move from that atmosphere, which is also one of words, of art, into a language foreign to the author's intimate mode of expression can only be a betrayal of a kind. The old straw – traduttore, traditore. I enjoy reading Le Clézio in French; I enjoy translating him into English. There is something about the re-creation of an author's world which is very heady and invigorating, along with the manipulation of words; one always hopes one will not get carried away during this process and betray the author's intention

== Publication history ==
=== "Journal du chercheur d'or" ===
==== Nouvelle Revue Française ====
Title	Year	Publisher	Length	Notes
"Journal du chercheur d'or"	1983	Nouvelle Revue Française 361, février: 1–23.	126 pages	

=== "Journal du chercheur d'or." ===
==== Nouvelle Revue Française ====
Title	Year	Publisher	Length	Notes
"Journal du chercheur d'or." "	1983	Nouvelle Revue Française 368, septembre: 1–21.	pages	

=== "Journal du chercheur d'or" ===
==== Nouvelle Revue Française ====
Title	Year	Publisher	Length	Notes
"Journal du chercheur d'or"	1984	Nouvelle Revue Française 375, avril: 1–13	pages	

=== First French Edition ===
- Le Clézio, J. M. G (1985). Le Chercheur d'or (in French). Paris: Gallimard, Folio. p. 375. ISBN 978-2-07-038082-4.

=== First English Translated Edition ===
- Le Clézio, J. M. G; translated by Carol Marks (1993). The prospector. Boston, MA, USA: David R. Godine "A Verba mundi original". pp. 375. ISBN 978-0-87923-976-3.

== Interview with Daniel E. Pritchard of Godine ==
Taken from the Quarterly Conversation Issue 14

SE:

About how many books do you publish per year?

Daniel E. Pritchard:

We publish around 30 new titles each year, and have a backlist that refuses to accept the term "Out of Print." They just keep moving, even if it's slow.

SE:

Godine publishes Le Clezio's novel The Prospector. Have you read it?

Daniel E. Pritchard :

I really enjoyed it, which was surprising only because I knew a bit about his style and it isn't normally what I'm drawn towards. But it is beautifully written, and translated, and by the end the book has led you to a kind of... well, I liked it and I'll leave it at that. The best way to know is just to read it. And if you can't buy it, ask your library to order it. They do that. Free books! The Boston Public Library is practically my living room
