= The African (essay) =

Autobiographical essay by J. M. G. Le Clézio

- Author: J. M. G. Le Clézio
- Original title: "L'Africain"
- Language: French
- Subject: Autobiography
- Genre: Essay
- Published: 2004 (Mercure De France); collection: Traits et portraits, Paris; 2014 (English translation, David R. Godine, Publisher)
- Publication place: France
- Pages: 103
- ISBN: 978-2-7152-2470-4
- OCLC: 54773472
- Dewey Decimal: 843/.914 B 22
- LC Class: PQ2672.E25 Z46 2004

"The African" (French: L'Africain) is a short autobiographical essay written by French Nobel laureate J. M. G. Le Clézio.

== Subject ==
In writing "L'Africain", Le Clézio reflects on his childhood in 1948 when he was 8 years old. According to the publisher he left Nice with his mother and brother to meet his father who was a doctor in Nigeria. His father remained there during the war but was too far away from the wife he loved and too far away from their two children (he had not seen either of these children growing up). In this short book Le Clézio remembers his father, who was a "jungle doctor" first in British Guiana and then in Southern Cameroons and Nigeria.

Here you can find Le Clézio's thoughts about his African childhood and about life in remote places. "L'Africain", the story of the author’s father, is at once a reconstruction, a vindication, and the recollection of a boy who lived in the shadow of a stranger he was obliged to love. He remembers through the landscape: Africa tells him who he was when he experienced the family’s reunion after the separation during the war years.The author may seem to be honouring the father from whom he was separated.

=== Preface ===
Le Clézio wrote an explanation of why he wrote this semi-autobiographical essay in the form of a short story on the cover of this book and in the second paragraph of the preface

I have long dreamed that my mother was black. I had invented a story, a history, to escape reality upon my return from Africa in this country, in this city where I did not know anyone, where I had become a stranger. Then I discovered when my father at the age of retirement, returned to live with us in France that he was the African. This has been difficult to accept. I felt I had to go back, once again, to try to understand. I wrote this little book as a souvenir."

Le Clézio, translated from French

=== "Ma vie sauvage" ===
An extract entitled "Ma vie sauvage" can be read in French online (with an introduction by Jérôme Garcin).

== Publication history ==
=== First French edition ===
- Le Clézio, J. M. G. (2004-05-03). L'Africain (in French). Paris: Mercure De France, collection: Traits et portraits. p. 114. ISBN 978-2-7152-2470-4.

=== First Spanish translation ===
- Le Clézio, J. M. G. (2007). Fabian Lebenglik (ed.). El Africano (Narrativas) (in Spanish). Buenos Aires, Argentina: Adriana Hidalgo Editora S.A. p. 144. ISBN 978-987-1156-58-0.
