= Dans la maison d'Edith =

1997 book by Jean-Marie Gustave Le Clézio

- Author: J. M. G. Le Clézio
- Original title: Dans la maison d'Edith
- Language: French
- Genre: Essay
- Publisher: University of Oklahoma
- Publication date: 1997
- Publication place: France
- Media type: Print

"Dans la maison d'Edith" is an essay written by French Nobel laureate J. M. G. Le Clézio. It was written in French and has not been translated into English, however the title translates as In Edith's House.

== Preface ==
The preface to this book was written by Le Clézio.

== Drawings and photographs ==
Drawings and photographs were provided for the World literature today article by J. M. G. Le Clézio and his wife Jemia Le Clézio.

== Publication history ==
- 1997, USA, World literature today. University of Oklahoma ISSN 0196-3570
