= Hasard suivi de Angoli Mala =

1999 book by J. M. G. Le Clézio

- 2001 Gallimard 'Folio' edition
- Author: J. M. G. Le Clézio
- Original title: Hasard suivi de Angoli Mala
- Language: French
- Genre: Novellas
- Publisher: Gallimard
- Publication date: 1999
- Publication place: France
- Media type: Print
- Pages: 290 pp
- ISBN: 2-07-041629-1
- OCLC: 434364104

Hasard suivi de Angoli Mala is the title given to a book with two novellas, written in French by French Nobel laureate writer J. M. G. Le Clézio.

== Contents ==
Two novels "Hasard" and "Angoli Mala" in one book

== Reviews ==
=== Hasard ===
Hasard is at once a tale of life on the sea and a depiction of the limits that life imposes, at this stage in our modernity, upon those who dream of living beyond limits. The novel presents two main characters, a young girl and an aging cinema producer. The young girl wants to escape from her loveless home after her father abandons his family

— Thiher

=== Angoli Mala ===
This vision is affirmed by the narration found in Angoli Mala, the name of a legendary figure cured of insanity by Buddha, or so Le Clezio tells us. The relation of Buddha to this story can only be ironic, for the shorter tale, narrating the life of a Central American Indian who lost his parents when a child, is the story of the destruction of this Indian at the hands of hostile governmental forces in the service of neocolonial business interests

— Thiher
