= Voyages de l'autre côté =

1975 novel by J. M. G. Le Clézio

- 1995 edition
- Author: J. M. G. Le Clézio
- Original title: Voyages de l'autre côté
- Language: French
- Genre: Novel
- Publisher: Gallimard, Le Chemin, Paris
- Publication date: 1975
- Publication place: France
- Media type: Print
- Pages: 250 pp
- ISBN: 2-07-074146-X
- OCLC: 246340295

Voyages de l'autre côté is a novel written in French by French Nobel laureate writer J. M. G. Le Clézio.

== Translation of the book's title ==
Voyages de l'autre côté could be translated as Journeys to the Other Side.

== Publication history ==
=== First French edition ===
- Le Clézio, J. M. G (1975). Voyages de l'autre côté (in French). Paris: Gallimard, Le Chemin. p. 250.
- Le Clézio, J. M. G (1995). Voyages de l'autre côté (in French). Paris: Gallimard, Le Chemin. p. 250.
