= War (Le Clézio novel) =

1970 novel by J. M. G. Le Clézio

- First US edition
- Author: J. M. G. Le Clézio
- Original title: La Guerre
- Translator: translated by Simon Watson Taylor
- Language: French
- Publisher: Gallimard, Le Chemin (France); Atheneum (US); Jonathan Cape (UK)
- Publication date: 1970
- Publication place: France
- English publication date: 1972
- Media type: Print
- Pages: 288 pp
- ISBN: 2-07-072546-4
- OCLC: 316145220

War (French: La Guerre) is a 1970 novel by French Nobel laureate writer J. M. G. Le Clézio. An English translation by Simon Watson Taylor was published in 1972.

War is a novel from Le Clézio's early and more experimental phase, which also includes Terra amata (1967), Le Livre des fuites (1969), and Les Géants (1973), among others. Readers have sometimes found these novels "more than occasionally tedious". Martin Amis described War as "a torment to read".

The New York Times, on the other hand, found the experimentation essential to the novel's subject matter, praising its accurate perceptions of the psychological effects of war, its lyrical descriptions, and heroine Bea B.'s "wonderful wide‐eyed internal babble", concluding that "despite the occasional flaws of his book Le Clezio has altered the form of the novel for traditional and authentic reasons: the old forms no longer serve to express modern experience".
