= Poisson d'or (novel) =

1997 novel by J. M. G. Le Clézio

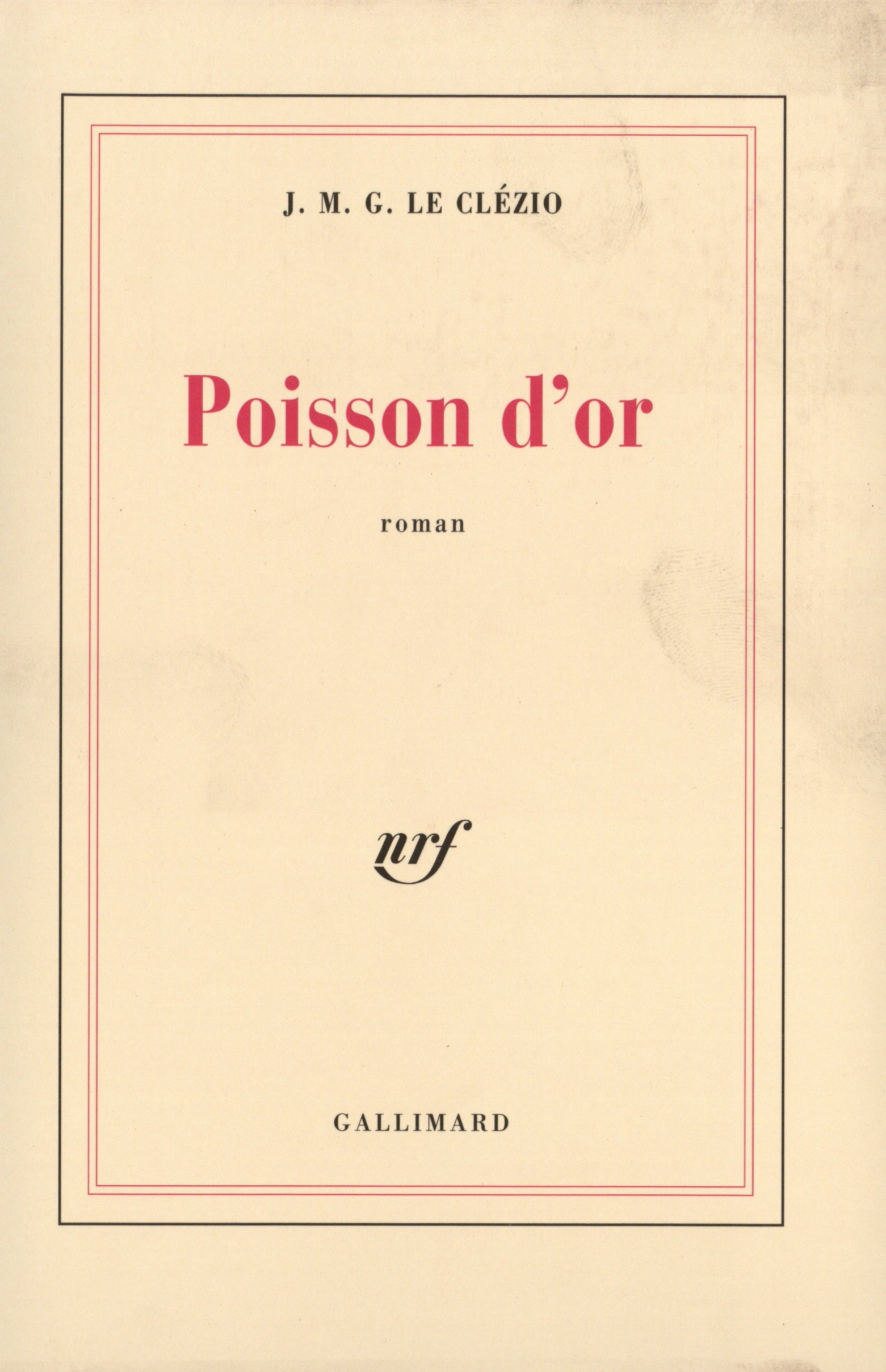
- 1997 Gallimard 'Collection Blanche' edition
- Author: J. M. G. Le Clézio
- Original title: Poisson d'or
- Language: French
- Genre: Novel
- Publisher: Gallimard
- Publication date: 1997
- Publication place: France
- Pages: 251 pp
- ISBN: 2-84011-222-1
- OCLC: 410115542

Poisson d'or (meaning Fish of Gold or Gold Fish in English) is a novel by the French Nobel laureate writer J. M. G. Le Clézio. It is the story of an African girl whose life has many adventures: a brothel in Morocco, a Spanish slum, Parisian Bohemian life, and at last a trip to America, where she fulfills her dream of becoming a jazz singer.

== Publication history ==
First edition
Le Clézio, J. M. G. Poisson d'or (in French). Paris: Gallimard, Folio.
Large print edition
Le Clézio, J. M. G. Poisson d'or (in French). Ulverscroft Large Print Books, Limited.
