= Ballaciner =

Book by J. M. G. Le Clézio

- Author: J. M. G. Le Clézio, Gilles Jacob
- Original title: Ballaciner
- Language: French
- Subject: Cinema
- Genre: Essay
- Publisher: Editions Gallimard, nrf, Paris
- Publication date: 2007
- Publication place: France
- Pages: 185
- ISBN: 978-2-07-078484-4
- OCLC: 132401827
- LC Class: PQ2672.E25 Z46 2007

Ballaciner is an essay by French Nobel laureate J. M. G. Le Clézio with help from Gilles Jacob. It was originally published in French in 2003.

Ballaciner was described by the Nobel committee as:

"A deeply personal essay about the history of the art of film and the importance of film in the author’s life, from the hand-turned projectors of his childhood, the cult of cinéaste trends in his teens, to his adult forays into the art of film as developed in unfamiliar parts of the world"

“Ballaciner” is a French neologism meaning adopting an attitude of a strolling moviegoer.

== Themes ==
"Ballaciner" is mainly an essay about cinema. The essay makes note of the films that have affected the author and makes the connection between literature and cinema. According to a review, the author is "a self-declared cinephile, whose fascination for cinema has always gone hand in hand with his love of literature". Another reviewer noted that this essay "offers penetrating analyses of some of the 'disturbing, unforgettable dreams' conjured up on the cinema screen"
