= The Flood (Le Clézio novel) =

1966 novel by J. M. G. Le Clézio

- First English edition
- Author: J. M. G. Le Clézio
- Original title: Le Déluge
- Translator: Peter Green
- Language: French
- Publisher: Gallimard
- Publication date: 1966
- Publication place: France
- English publication date: 1967
- Media type: Print (Hardback)
- ISBN: 2-07-073794-2
- OCLC: 5783822

The Flood (French: Le Déluge) is a 1966 novel about trouble and fear in major Western cities by Nobel laureate J. M. G. Le Clézio.

== Contents ==
Section	Contents
1	espadrille, moped, macadam
2	Coventry Cathedral, snail, erasure
3	trolley-bus, geranium, macintoshes

== Publication history ==
=== First French edition ===
- Le Clézio, J. M. G. (1966). Le Déluge (in French). Paris: Éditions Gallimard, Le Chemin. p. 285. ISBN 2-07-073794-2.

=== Second French edition ===
- Le Clézio, J. M. G (1994-03-04). Le Déluge (Mass Market Paperback) (in French). Paris: Gallimard. p. 285. ISBN 978-2-07-073794-9.

=== First English edition ===
- Le Clézio, J. M. G.; Translated by Peter Green (1966). The Flood. London: Hamish Hamilton. ISBN 978-0-241-91339-0.

=== Second English edition ===
- Le Clézio, J. M. G.; Translated by Peter Green (2009). The Flood. London: Penguin Books Ltd. p. 300. ISBN 978-0-14-119140-9.
