= On Reading as True Travel =

Essay by J. M. G. Le Clézio

- Author: J. M. G. Le Clézio
- Original title: "Sur la lecture comme le vrai voyage"
- Language: French
- Genre: Essay
- Publisher: British Library Serials
- Publication place: France

"On Reading as True Travel" (original title: De la lecture comme seul voyage) is an essay written in French by the French Nobel laureate, J. M. G. Le Clézio.

== Translated from the French ==
It was translated from French into English by Julia Abramson, assistant professor of French at the Department of Modern Languages, Literatures, and Linguistics at the University of Oklahoma, as "On reading as true travel" and published in English in 2002.

== Publication history ==
"Sur la lecture comme le vrai voyage" was written in French. The original title of the essay could be supposed to have been De la lecture comme seul voyage (no publication sources found).
