= L'Inconnu sur la Terre =

- Author: J. M. G. Le Clézio
- Language: French
- Genre: Essay
- Publisher: Gallimard, Paris
- Publication date: 1978
- Publication place: France
- Pages: 325 pp
- ISBN: 978-2-07-075488-5
- OCLC: 316291019

"L'Inconnu sur la Terre" is an essay written by French Nobel laureate J. M. G. Le Clézio.

== Subject ==
The essay is described by the author as being a long journal written on Italian schoolbooks of a young boy's erratic walkabout on the soil, though not far from the sea, somewhat lost in the fog, and who particularly likes the intensive light of day.

== Publication history ==
=== Nouvelle Revue Française: I ===
"L'inconnu sur la terre." I. Nouvelle Revue Française 299, déc: 1–21, 1977.

=== Nouvelle Revue Française: II ===
"L'inconnu sur la terre." II. Nouvelle Revue Française 300, janvier: 46–64. 1978.

=== Nouvelle Revue Française: fin ===
"L'inconnu sur la terre." fin. Nouvelle Revue Française 301, fév: 70–84. 1978.

=== First French edition ===
- Le Clézio, JMG (2006) [1978]. L'inconnu sur la terre. reprint (in French). Paris: Gallimard. p. 395. ISBN 978-2-07-075488-5.
