= La Fête chantée et autres essais de thème amérindien =

Short stories by J. M. G. Le Clézio

- First edition
- Author: J. M. G. Le Clézio
- Original title: La Fête chantée et autres essais de thème amérindien
- Language: French
- Genre: Short story collection
- Publisher: Le Promeneur, Paris
- Publication place: France
- Media type: Print
- Pages: 239 pp
- ISBN: 978-2-07-074912-6
- OCLC: 39936353
- Dewey Decimal: 972.004/97 21
- LC Class: F1219 .L38 1997

La Fête chantée et autres essais de thème amérindien is the title of a collection of short stories written in French by French Nobel laureate J. M. G. Le Clézio and published in 1997 .

== Table of contents ==
- La fête chantée
- Trois livres indiens
- La conquête divine du Michoacan
- De la fête à la guerre
- Le rêve d'or de l'Amérique indienne
- Les Chichimèques : Indigénisme et révolution
- Mythes amérindiens et littérature
- La corne d'abondance
- Jacobo Daciano à Tarécuato
- Trois célébrations du Mexique
- Peuple des oiseaux
- Dzibilnocac, écrit de nuit
- La voix indienne : Rigoberta Menchú
- Toutes choses sont liées
- La danse contre le déluge

== Publication history ==
=== First French edition ===
- Le Clézio, J. M. G (1997). La Fête chantée et autres essais de thème amérindien (in French). Paris: Le Promeneur. pp. 239. ISBN 978-2-07-074912-6.
