= Mydriase =

- Author: J. M. G. Le Clézio
- Language: French
- Genre: Essay
- Publisher: Éditions Fata Morgana, Saint-Clément-la-Rivière
- Publication date: 1973
- Publication place: France
- Media type: Print
- Pages: 62 pp
- ISBN: 978-2-85194-071-1
- OCLC: 731457

"Mydriase" is an essay written by French Nobel laureate J. M. G. Le Clézio.

== Publication history ==
- 1973, France, Éditions Fata Morgana, Saint-Clément-la-Rivière (éd. définitive, 1993).
