= La Ronde et autres faits divers =

The Round & Other Cold Hard Facts
- 1982 Folio edition
- Author: J. M. G. Le Clézio
- Original title: La Ronde et autres faits divers
- Translator: C. Dickson
- Language: French translated into English
- Genre: Short story collection
- Publisher: Bison Books
- Publication date: 14 April 1982
- Publication place: France
- English publication date: September 2002
- Media type: Print (hardback)
- Pages: 214 pp
- ISBN: 978-2-07-021395-5
- OCLC: 8781480
- Dewey Decimal: 843/.914 19
- LC Class: PQ2672.E25 R66 1982

La Ronde et autres faits divers (1982) is the title of a set of short stories written in French by French Nobel laureate J. M. G. Le Clézio and translated into English as The Round & Other Cold Hard Facts.

== Geographical background ==
The reviewer of this book from the New York Times finds the protagonists of the 11 stories in The Round & Other Cold Hard Facts to be underprivileged although they are residents of a very privileged area: the French Riviera.

== Critique ==
=== Uneven ===
The reviewer of this book from Barnes & Noble wrote that even though none of the eleven short-stories are out of the ordinary, the author does however find strange goings on. This reviewer surmises that this collection of stories is uneven and the style of writing can make for monotonous reading.

=== It is quite often painfully hard to read ===
According to John Pilling there is insistent use of the present tense used throughout the book that produced in the mind of this reviewer "a kind of literary indigestion". He went on to mention that a person could "fear the snare of thinking that this sort of literary indigestion is therefore good for the person reading!"

== There is suffering in every story ==
1. sometimes just because the protagonist is lonely
2. maybe has been robbed (injured or raped)
3. some vagabonds try to smuggle across the Italian border
4. two girls run away from home
5. how a child becomes a thief
6. a woman gives birth alone on the carpet of her mobile home
7. a girl is crushed to death by a truck
8. another girl is raped in a communal basement

== Table of contents ==
Original title in French

- La ronde
- Moloch
- L'échappé
- Ariane
- Villa Aurore
- Le jeu d'Anne
- La grande vie
- Le passeur
- O voleur, voleur, quelle vie est la tienne?
- Orlamonde
- David

Translated into English

- The Round
- Moloch
- The Escapee
- Ariadne
- Villa Aurora
- Anne's Game
- The Great Life
- The Runner
- O Thief What Is the Life You Lead?
- Yondaland
- David

== Publication history ==
=== First French edition ===
- Le Clézio, J. M. G. (1982-04-14). La Ronde Et Autres Faits Divers (Le Chemin) (in French). Paris: Gallimard Collections "Le Chemin" "Le Promeneur"+"Folio". pp. 281. ISBN 978-2-07-021395-5.

Also published as La Ronde Et Autres Faits Divers: [Nouvelles] (Le Chemin)

=== Second French edition ===
- Le Clézio, J. M. G. (1991). La Ronde Et Autres Faits Divers (Collectin Folio) (Mass Market Paperback) (in French). Paris: Editions Flammarion. p. 281. ISBN 978-2-07-038237-8.

Also published by Gallimard Education as Ronde Et Autres Faits Divers (La) (Collectin Folio) in a Mass Market Paperback format

=== Third French edition ===
- Le Clézio, J. M. G. (1990-01-01). La Ronde et Autres Faits Divers (in French). Paris: Folio Schoenhof's Foreign Books, Incorporated. p. 281. ISBN 978-2-07-038237-8.

Also published as Ronde Et Autres Faits Divers (La) (Collectin Folio) by Gallimard Education

=== Fourth French edition ===
- Le Clézio, J. M. G. (1990-10-01). La Ronde et Autres Faits Divers (Nobel Prize Literature 2008) (in French). Paris: French & European Pubns. p. 281. ISBN 978-0-8288-3708-8.

=== First English translation ===
- Le Clézio, J. M. G.; Translated by C. Dickson. The Round and Other Cold Hard Facts. Lincoln, Nebraska, USA: University of Nebraska Press. p. 281. ISBN 978-0-8032-2946-4.

=== Audio edition in French ===
There is a spoken version of "La ronde et autres faits divers"CD & MP3 as read in French by Bernard Giraudeau.

=== Second English edition ===
- Le Clézio, J. M. G.; Translated by C. Dickson (2002-09-01). The Round and Other Cold Hard Facts. Lincoln, Nebraska, USA: Bison Books. p. 214. ISBN 978-0-8032-8007-6.
