= Mondo and Other Stories =

1978 short story collection by French author J. M. G. Le Clézio

- 1978 Gallimard Folio edition
- Author: J. M. G. Le Clézio
- Original title: Mondo et autres histoires
- Cover artist: Georges Lemoine
- Language: French
- Genre: Short story collection
- Publisher: Gallimard, Paris; U of Nebraska P, Lincoln
- Publication date: 1978 (French); 2011 (English)
- Publication place: France
- Pages: 379 pp
- ISBN: 9782070386765 (1st French ed. 9780803230002 (English translation)
- OCLC: 299465126

Mondo et autres histoires is a 1978 short story collection by French author J. M. G. Le Clézio. The stories in this collection all concern adolescents who in one way or another leave their familiar (civilized) circumstances and have numinous experiences accompanied by a rite of passage or other initiation.

== Contents and themes ==
In "Lullaby" a young girl leaves the busy town for the sea, and a meditative experience (compared to passages in Thoreau's Walden and Rousseau's Reveries of a Solitary Walker) lets her realize a transformed way of respiration after which a journey ensues along rocks with mysterious inscriptions, a bunker, a white villa, a Greek temple, and other places of self-discovery. An encounter with a threatening man prompts her to jump from a cliff and crawl back to her village just before she, apparently, is to understand the meaning of her journey.

Likewise, "The Boy Who Had Never Seen the Sea" is a story of a boy "who runs away from school to be near the sea"; this story was translated into English and published by The New Yorker in 2008.

== Stories ==
- "Mondo"

Mondo is a mysterious young boy who appears one day in a small hamlet and quickly integrates himself into daily life. He does not have a home, rather taking refuge in the natural surroundings of the village. He wanders the village, talking to locals and frequently asking passersby to adopt him, though he flees when they ask him any questions. One day, Mondo buys a Kit Carlson booklet and goes to the shore, where he meets Giordan the fisherman, who teaches the boy to fish and tells him stories of the world. At dusk, Mondo leaves to find shelter, and the fisherman offers to teach him to read. One morning, Mondo sees a group of men kidnap a stray dog. A passerby tells him that it was the Ciapacan, who often kidnap children who don’t go to school. This makes Mondo incredibly anxious. He then meets the Gypsy, the Cossack, and Dadi, who perform shows. When evening falls, the group drinks together and Mondo falls asleep in the back of the Gypsy’s car. Later, Mondo explores the city on the day of a festival. He tries to find someone to adopt him, but no one hears him. Later, in the summer, Mondo stumbles across the House of Golden Light, in which lives Thi Chin, a Vietnamese woman who invites him to have tea with her. They talk, and after he naps in the home, she informs him that the home is now his as well, and he can return whenever he likes.

Throughout the summer, Mondo returns to sleep at the House of Golden Light, assuaging his fear of the Ciapacan. He spends time with his friends the Gypsy, the Cossack, and Dadi and continues to meet new people around the village. One day, Mondo decides he wants to learn to read. He meets Marcel, an old man, on the beach, who starts to teach the boy how to read. He learns some letters and listens to Marcel’s stories of far away lands. Marcel promises to take the boy with him on his travels, and then Mondo goes to the House of Golden Light. He spends time with Thi Chin in the garden and they fall asleep under the stars. The next stay, Mondo sets out to look for his friend Dadi, but the Cossack tells him that he was “picked up” the night before. Mondo is convinced that he was kidnapped by the Ciapacan. He returns to the streets and becomes unable to move. People from the town pick him up, and he believes he is being kidnapped.

Two days later, Thi Chin goes to the police looking for Mondo but they tell her that he is being cared for and she can’t see him. The next day, the Police Commissioner goes to the House of Golden Light and asks Thi Chin if she has seen Mondo return home. She checks, and Mondo is nowhere to be seen, but has set fire to her mattress. Thi Chin cries, knowing she will never see Mondo again. Time passes, and everyone forgets about Mondo. Eventually, Thi Chin finds a pebble in her garden in which the words “toujours beaucoup” (always a lot) were carved.

- "Lullaby"

A young teenager named Lullaby wakes up one day and decides she is done going to school. She returns her alarm clock to her father, and sets out to the seaside. She is enamored with her natural surroundings. She then comes across an old German Bunker with the words “find me” written on its walls in chalk. She looks for the person who wrote them, but then continues on, finding a small swimming cove. After swimming, she writes a letter to her father, describing her adventures, though it mostly consists of random works. She then discovers an abandoned Greek house with the word karisma written over the door frame. She settles down on the veranda, and looks out to the sea. Lullaby then starts her return home, where she meets a boy with glasses. She asks him to draw something for her the next day. Throughout the week, Lullaby continues to visit the Greek house, feeling at peace and as one with nature. Later, she decides to go to a sheltered cove and light a fire, taking joy in burning pieces of paper and watching the words disappear. The boy with glasses approaches and joins her. He offers her the drawing he did of her to throw in the fire, but she decides to keep it, saying she will burn it when she starts to love him too much. At noon, the boy leaves and Lullaby goes to explore another abandoned house. However, as she settles in front of the house to admire the view, a strange man silently approaches her. She tries to hide, but knowing that she has been spotted, has no choice but jump off of a cliff and into the sea, letting the waves carry her back to shore. The next day, Lullaby walks in the forest, trying to ignore her dilemma but eventually coming to the conclusion that she cannot continue her adventures. Fearing her deception will be uncovered, she returns to town. She is unsettled by the bustle of the town, and after visiting a department store and eating an omelet, she decides to return to school. When she arrives, she is told that the Headmistress is looking for her. The headmistress questions her about her week-long absence, but doubts Lullaby’s descriptions of her adventures in nature and the Greek house, assuming that she was skipping to see a boyfriend. Lullaby shouts at the headmistress, denying the claims, and she is eventually allowed to return to class. Instead, she runs to the courtyard to ask her physics teacher Mr. Philippi about the sea, but forgets her questions. He assures her that he will discuss the sea with her after class.

- "La montagne du dieu vivant" ("The Mountain of the Living God")

Jon, a young teen, admires the massive mountain Reydarmarbur and approaches it without reason. He hears a strange soothing whisper but cannot see anything. He continues, traversing a river when he finds himself engulfed in a strange light. He reaches the base and spots a large valley filled with lava and icy foam at the top of the mountain. Motivated by an unexplainable force, he climbs the mountain to the summit, where he sees the valley and the lava within the mountain. He then walks to the center of a plain at the top of the mountain and the wind suddenly ceases. He examined 3 sculpted basins that were there engulfing the passing wind. He then explores a body of water nearby and finds a strange rock that resembles the mountain. He tries to pick it up but it's fixed to the ground. He looks towards some holes in the mountain and once he looks back towards the basins, he sees a child. The child calls out to Jon by his name. Jon questions the child, but does not receive much information. Eventually, he learns that the child is content to be living alone on the mountain. The sun sets and the child invites Jon to spend the night on the mountain. Jon hesitantly agrees and takes in his natural surroundings before falling asleep next to the child. When he awakes the child has disappeared. He searches for him but, finding nothing, becomes fearful and runs off the mountain and back to his home.

- "La roue d'eau" ("The Waterwheel")

Juba, a young teenager, lives in a village with his family. He wakes up one day at dawn and leaves his home to work with his oxen. As the sun rises, Juba looks over the countryside and hears the sound of a water wheel in a nearby stream. He closes his eyes, and finds himself transported into the sky by a white culture. He looks down on the landscape and sees the white village of Yol, the city of the dead. Everyone in the village assembles to welcome Juba because the past king of the village had his same name. He climbed the steps of the temple of Diana and introduced himself as the king of the village. He is then joined by Cléopâtre-Séléné, the daughter of Anthony the Great and Cleopatra, and they sit together on the steps of the temple. Juba speaks of his joy at seeing the village and his hopes to improve it further. He also discusses his goal to assemble all of the wisest men in the village to write the history of the human race. Eventually, they stop talking and listen to the sound of the water wheels that encircle the village. As the sun sets, all of the buildings and people in the village disappear and it is engulfed by water. Looking up at the crescent moon, Juba returns to the valley and his true surroundings. He hears someone call his names and returns his oxen to their mount before starting back towards his village. As he walks, he wonders if Yol will reappear tomorrow when the water wheel turns again.

- "Celui qui n'avait jamais vu la mer" ("Daniel Who Had Never Seen the Sea")
- "Hazaran"
- "Peuple du ciel" ("People of the Sky")
- "Les bergers" ("The Shepherds")

"Mondo" was the basis for the 1995 film of the same name by Tony Gatlif. "Lullaby", "Peuple du ciel", "Les Bergers", "Celui qui n'avait jamais vu la mer", and "La Montagne du dieu vivant" were also published separately.

== Reception ==
Mondo has been generally well received. It is commonly read by children aged 10 to 13 in schools in France. Upon reflection of this collection of stories, Zaynul Abedin of the University of Dhaka, says “the imaginative prowess that Le Clézio exhibits… earned him the Nobel Prize in Literature in 2008.” While it was not initially translated into many languages, following this award, it became globally popular and is now available in 36 languages. Booklist wrote "This collection of stories by the recipient of the 2008 Nobel Prize in Literature may not be to everyone's goût, but no one who reads it will complain about the quality of the writing." and "Anderson's elegant translation conveys the detailed, physical, fluid, and complex lushness of the language, which may engage and satisfy readers of Garcia Marquez and other master stylists." Publishers Weekly called it a"vivid, subtle collection". The Washington Post described the stories as "strange, hypnotic, overtly poetic pieces" and concludes "In Le Clezio’s fictional universe, the world exists in a prelapsarian state of timeless grace, at least until the inevitably corrupt and destructive world of adults comes crashing in." Library Journal found that "his quiet explorations of beauty and culture are freshly, conversationally written."

== Publication history ==
- First French edition: Le Clézio, J. M. G (1978). Mondo et autres histoires (in French). Paris: Gallimard. ISBN 2-07-038676-7.
- Second French edition: Le Clézio, J. M. G (1987). Mondo et autres histoires (in French). Paris: Gallimard Education.
- Third French edition: Le Clézio, J. M. G (1996). Mondo et autres histoires (in French). Paris: Gallimard Education.
- Fourth French edition: Le Clézio, J. M. G (1982). Mondo et autres histoires (Collection Folio) (French Edition) (Mass Market Paperback) (in French). Prefaced by Christophe-Édouard Konaté and with an illustrated presentation by Isabelle Varloteaux. Paris: Gallimard Education. ISBN 978-2-07-037365-9. OCLC 281627788.12th re-Print Gallimard, Paris 2008 (With new author biography) and 2000 (Reprint: 1982 ed)
- Fifth French edition: Le Clézio, J. M. G (2006). Mondo et autres histoires (in French). Prefaced by Christophe-Édouard Konaté and with an illustrated presentation by Isabelle Varloteaux. Paris: Gallimard Education, Folioplus classiques, 67. ISBN 978-2-07-033785-9.
- Sixth French edition: Le Clézio, J. M. G (2008) [1982]. Mondo et autres histoires (in French). Paris: Gallimard. ISBN 978-2-07-037365-9. With new author biography
- First English edition: Le Clézio, J. M. G (2011). Mondo and Other Stories. Translated by Alison Anderson. Lincoln: University of Nebraska Press. ISBN 978-0-80-322999-0.
