= Desert (novel) =

1980 novel by J. M. G. Le Clézio

- First English edition (US)
- Author: J. M. G. Le Clézio
- Original title: Désert
- Language: French
- Publisher: Gallimard; David R. Godine (US)
- Publication date: 6 May 1980
- Publication place: France
- English publication date: 2009
- Media type: Print (Hardback)
- Pages: 410 pp
- ISBN: 978-2-07-020712-1
- OCLC: 15090765

Desert (French: Désert) is a 1980 novel written by French Nobel laureate writer J. M. G. Le Clézio, considered to be one of his breakthrough novels. It won the Académie française's Grand Prix Paul Morand in 1980.

== Plot summary ==
Two stories are interwoven.

The shorter, which begins and ends the book, is specifically set in 1909–1910 and later 1912, and tells of the wanderings of North African desert tribes chased from their lands by French colonial invaders, mostly as observed by a small boy, Nour. The beginning is set in the Saguia el-Hamra region in the Western Sahara, around the town of Smara, and the story follows the tribe on their gruelling journey across the desert to Tiznit. The story tells of Nour’s encounter with the religious leader Ma al-'Aynayn, whom he worships and follows.

The longer, the story of Lalla, is set in an unspecified contemporary time. It describes her early life in a shanty town on the edge of an unnamed Moroccan coastal town, and particularly her friendship with a young mute Hartani shepherd who, like her, originates from the desert tribes. It narrates the time she spends in Marseille while already pregnant with the Hartani’s child. In France she encounters great poverty before becoming a photo model, but she eventually returns to her native town in Morocco, where she gives birth to the Hartani's child.

== Publication history ==
First French edition

- Le Clézio, J. M. G (1980). Désert (in French). Paris: Gallimard, Le Chemin. p. 410. ISBN 978-2-07-020712-1.

Second French edition

- Le Clézio, J. M. G (2008). Désert (in French). Paris: Gallimard. p. 410. ISBN 978-2-07-037670-4.

First English translated edition

- Le Clézio, J. M. G (2009). Desert. translated from the French by C. Dickson. David R. Godine. ISBN 978-1-56792-386-5.

First Malayalam translated edition

- Le Clézio, J. M. G (2011). Marubhoomi (in Malayalam). translated from English by Dr. S. Sreenivasan. India: DC Books. ISBN 978-8-12643-431-2.
