= The Interrogation (novel) =

1963 novel by J. M. G. Le Clézio

- First UK edition
- Author: J. M. G. Le Clézio
- Original title: Le Procès-Verbal
- Translator: Daphne Woodward
- Cover artist: Jonathan Nicholl
- Language: French
- Publisher: Gallimard; Hamish Hamilton (UK); Atheneum (US)
- Publication date: 1963
- Publication place: France
- English publication date: 1964
- OCLC: 27088925
- Followed by: Le Jour où Beaumont fit connaissance avec sa douleur

The Interrogation (French: Le Procès-Verbal) is the debut novel of French Nobel laureate writer J. M. G. Le Clézio, about a troubled man named Adam Pollo who "struggles to contextualize what he sees" and "to negotiate often disturbing ideas while simultaneously navigating through, for him, life’s absurdity and emptiness".

In 2022, the novel was included on the "Big Jubilee Read" list of 70 books by Commonwealth authors, selected to celebrate the Platinum Jubilee of Elizabeth II.

== Subject ==
The novel is about Adam Pollo, a loner man who had been marginalized from society. His long hair and his beard make him appear a beggar. Pollo is a former student who has amnesia. He does not know whether he was perhaps a deserter from the army or if he has escaped from a psychiatric ward. Le Clézio wrote:

[He] was trying to remember something pertaining to what happened ten years ago: maybe a phrase, maybe a tell-tale sign from the army, maybe a name or a place which would indicate just when it occurred and waiting, waiting (thinking, thinking) to come up with where it might have happened.

He breaks into an empty seaside villa. He visits the town at rare intervals and as briefly as his scant purchases (of cigarettes, biscuits, or even beer) require. Soon, lack of human contact affects him like a drug and he experiences other modes of being: through a dog's or rat’s eyes, states of heightened consciousness which build up into a terrifying world of glaring hallucinatory experience. Then Adam addresses a small crowd in the town. His unnerving rhetoric ends in his arrest and commitment to an asylum. And there the interrogation begins.

== Awards ==
- Written when Le Clézio was 23, this novel was shortlisted for the prix Goncourt.
- Received the prix Renaudot in 1963.
- Considered in the final stage for the Prix Formentor.

== Publication history ==
Seven editions published between 1988 and 2004 in 4 languages and held by 766 libraries worldwide.

== The Interrogation of Adam Pollo ==
An operatic adaptation of the novel by Arthur Keegan-Bole, entitled The Interrogation of Adam Pollo, was staged at the 2012 Tête à Tête Opera Festival in London, and was awarded a Director’s Choice Award from the Boston Metro Opera Company at the 2014 Boston-International Contempo Festival.

== See also ==
- Le Monde's 100 Books of the Century
