= Pawana =

Short story by J. M. G. Le Clézio

- 2nd edition (1995)
- Author: J. M. G. Le Clézio; Bruno Doucey (3rd ed.)
- Original title: Awaité Pawana
- Translator: Brunski, Christophe
- Illustrator: Georges Lemoine (2nd/3rd ed.)
- Language: French
- Genre: Short story collection
- Publisher: Gallimard
- Publication date: 26 July 1992
- Publication place: France
- Pages: 54
- ISBN: 978-2-07-072806-0
- OCLC: 27025357

"Pawana" (or "Awaité Pawana") is a short story written in French by French Nobel laureate J. M. G. Le Clézio.

== Historical basis ==
According to the author this is a true story about the whaler Charles Melville Scammon (1825–1911). In December 1857, Charles Scammon, in the brig Boston, along with his schooner-tender Marin, entered Laguna Ojo de Liebre (Jack-Rabbit Spring Lagoon), later known as Scammon's Lagoon, and found one of the Gray Whale's last refuges. The story resembles the tale of Captain Ahab in Herman Melville's Moby-Dick, who was also on the deck of a wooden ship searching for a white whale.

Pawana is about the discovery of a lagoon in Mexico at the end of the 19th century where gray whales went to reproduce. After Captain Scammon mistakenly decided to exterminate the whales, he realized that he had made a mistake so terrible it could become irreparable. Captain Scammon then set about dedicating his life's work to saving these whales (and was helped by a Mexican revolutionary in doing so).

== Meaning of "Awaité Pawana" ==
"Awaité Pawana" is the cry uttered by the lookout when he spies the whales.

== Narrative ==
Araceli, the old Indian slave from Nantucket tells a young cabin boy about the exploits of the Indians of the past through mime and gesture. John, the eighteen-year-old cabin boy and Captain Scammon alternate in recounting a journey.

== Adaptions ==
Georges Lavaudant staged Pawana for the Festival d'Avignon

== Reviews ==
Read a ten page review of "Awaite Pawana" online

These two narrative voices, which present two contrasting perspectives of the same event, possess a certain theatrical quality

== Publication history ==
=== First French edition ===
- Le Clézio, J. M. G (1992). Awaité Pawana (in French). Paris: Gallimard. p. 54. ISBN 978-2-07-072806-0.

=== Second French edition ===
- Le Clézio, J. M. G; Illustrated by Georges Lemoine (1995). Awaité Pawana (in French). Paris: Gallimard-Jeunesse (1995:Lecture junior, 52;1999 Folio junior, 1001)). p. 87. ISBN 978-2-07-058777-3.

=== Third French edition ===
- Le Clézio, J. M. G (2003). Awaité Pawana (in French). Illustrated by Georges Lemoine; lecture accompagnée par Bruno Doucey. Paris: Gallimard :La bibliothèque Gallimard. pp. 127/144. ISBN 978-2-07-042842-7.

=== First English translation ===
"Awaité Pawana" was translated into English as "Pawana" by Christophe Brunski (AGNI Magazine:published at Boston University (2008). There is a translation available online.
