= Wandering Star (novel) =

1992 novel by J. M. G. Le Clézio

- 1994 Gallimard 'Folio' edition
- Author: J. M. G. Le Clézio
- Original title: Étoile errante
- Translator: C. Dickson
- Language: French translated into English
- Genre: Novel
- Publisher: Gallimard
- Publication date: 1992
- Publication place: France
- English publication date: 2005
- Media type: Print
- Pages: 339 pp
- ISBN: 978-2-07-072650-9
- OCLC: 26148691

Wandering Star (original title: Étoile errante) is a novel by French Nobel laureate writer J. M. G. Le Clézio. The novel tells the story of two teenage girls on the threshold and in the aftermath of World War II. Esther, a French Jew who flees for Jerusalem with her mother just after Italy's occupation of a small section of south-east France ended during World War II; and Nejma, a young Arab orphaned and unable to return to the ancient city of her birth, Akka, after the Israeli declaration of statehood. Esther emigrates to the newborn state of Israel, where she encounters another group of refugees, this time Palestinian.

== Plot summary ==
In the year 1944 in a mountainous area on the French-Italian border Esther and her mother and all the Jews in the village of Saint-Martin must cross from France to Italy to avoid the SS. After the war, she and her mother, Elizabeth, begin their long journey to France, to the sailing ship Sette Fratelli which will take them to Palestine. When Esther finally arrives in Jerusalem, she briefly meets and exchanges names with Nejma, a Palestinian, another wanderer, one who ends up, in the summer of 1948, in the Nour Chams Refugee Camp.

== Political elements ==
According to one reviewer Wandering Star could have been an affecting novel if Le Clézio had written solely of the Palestinian or Jewish refugees. The reviewer commented further that by "taking no sides" and by "showing the agony of all" Le Clézio had produced "a near masterpiece". In the French newspaper Le Monde Pierre Lepape put forward that Le Clézio "goes much farther than that, much deeper;" in that Le Clézio's writing looks at the pivotal points of life itself for signs of trouble as much his writing looks for hope of peace (even confronting both time and the elements). Le Clézio's writing seeks by way of the sun and by way of the earth (being born and the process of death), prodding into the mystery of the origin of everything (despite not knowing the future) towards a need to forget as well as a need to remember (without these needs nothing is repairable)
