= La Quarantaine (novel) =

1995 novel by J. M. G. Le Clézio

- 1997 Gallimard 'Folio' edition
- Author: J. M. G. Le Clézio
- Original title: La Quarantaine
- Language: French
- Genre: Novel
- Publisher: Gallimard, collections "Blanche" et "Folio"
- Publication date: 1995
- Publication place: France
- Pages: 540 pp
- ISBN: 978-2-07-074318-6
- OCLC: 34472980
- Dewey Decimal: 843/.914 20
- LC Class: PQ2672.E25 Q37 1995

La Quarantaine is a 1995 novel by French Nobel laureate writer J. M. G. Le Clézio. No English translation has been published.

Together with Révolutions (2003) and Ritournelle de la faim (2008), it is one of Le Clézio's Mauritius novels. Like many of his works, it has an autobiographical element.

The novel describes Le Clézio's grandparent's journey to Mauritius in the 1870s, but most of the novel is set during their quarantine on Île Plate, close to Mauritius. The final chapter jumps to the 1980s, when the narrator is travelling to Mauritius to research his ancestry. The novel also describes the grandfather's meetings with Arthur Rimbaud in Paris and later in Aden.

== Publication history ==
=== First French edition ===
- Le Clézio, J. M. G (1995). La Quarantaine (in French). Paris: Gallimard, collections "Blanche" et "Folio". p. 540. ISBN 978-2-07-074318-6.
