= Onitsha (novel) =

Book by Jean-Marie Gustave Le Clézio

- 1991 Gallimard 'Folio' edition
- Author: J. M. G. Le Clézio
- Translator: Alison Anderson
- Language: French translated into English
- Subject: Colonialism
- Genre: Coming of Age
- Publisher: Gallimard (France); University of Nebraska Press
- Publication date: 1991 (French), 1997 (English)
- Media type: Print (Paperback and Hardcover)
- Pages: 206 pp

Onitsha is a novel by French Nobel laureate writer J. M. G. Le Clézio. It was originally published in French in 1991 and an English translation was released in 1997.

== Plot summary ==
Onitsha tells the story of Fintan, a young European boy who travels from Bordeaux to the port of Marseille to sail along the coast of Africa to the mouth of the Niger River to Onitsha in colonial Nigeria with his Italian mother (nicknamed Maou) in the year 1948. Warren Motte wrote a review in World Literature Today to note that, like many of Le Clézio's writings Onitsha is a novel of apprenticeship. He mentions that the very first words of the novel inscribe the theme of the journey and announce that it will occupy the foreground of the tale and he quotes a passage from Onitsha to exemplify Fintan's reluctance to embark upon that journey

Le Surabaya, un navire de cinq mille trois cents tonneaux, deja vieux, de la Holland Africa Line, venait de quitter les eaux sales de l'estuaire de la Gironde et faisait route vers la cote ouest de l'Afrique, et Fintan regardait sa mere comme si c'etait pour la premiere fois. The Holland Africa Line had this vessel (which was already an old vessel) weighing three hundred tons named Le Surabaya which had just left the dirty waters of the Gironde estuary and was bound for the west coast of Africa. Fintan watched and saw his own mother as if it were the first time he ever saw her.

It was a long journey as Le Clézio wrote:

The days were so long. Perhaps it was the summertime light, or the horizon, so far away, with nothing to hold one's gaze. It was like waiting, hour after hour, until you no longer knew what you were waiting for

They were intending to meet Geoffroy Allen (Fintan's English father an oil company executive who is obsessed with uncovering the area's ancient history by tracking down myths and legends) whom Fintan has never met.
Onitsha depicts childhood, because it is written semi-autobiographically, but seen through the eyes of Fintan and to lesser extent his father, and his mother, who is not able to fit in with the colonial society of the town of Onitsha with its casual acceptance of 'native' slave labour. Le Clézio wrote:

When he turned ten, Fintan decided he would call his mother only by her nickname. Her name was Maria Luisa, but she was called Maou; Fintan, as a baby, could not pronounce her name, and so it had stuck. He had taken his mother by the hand, looked straight into her eyes, and decided: "From today on I shall call you Maou." He looked so serious that she stood speechless for a moment, then she burst out laughing, a mad laughter that occasionally took hold of her, irresistibly. Fintan had laughed, too, and that had sealed their agreement.

Eventually, Fintan's father loses his job with the United Africa Company and moves the family first to London, then to the south of France. Sabine Rhodes, another British National, already a miscast in the colony recognises the inevitable

The days are numbered for all of us, all of us! The empire is finished, signorita, it's crumbling on every side, turning to dust; the great ship of empire is sinking. But I shan't leave. I shall stay here to see it all, that's my mission, my vocation, to watch the ship go under

The novel ends on a note of rebellion against the white rulers and points towards the coming of the neocolonialism of conglomerates which would finally begin another form of economic exploitation of a country rich in oil.

== Critique ==
The book is a critique on racism and the vestiges of colonialism as seen from the youthful perspective of the main character

Throughout the book, Fintan's rejection of colonialism is symbolized by the attacks of his mother Maou, who increasingly speaks out against the way the colonials treat the indigenous people. The book seemingly mimics Le Clézio's own life, especially when the character travels back to Africa in an attempt to fill in the sense of loss he had suffered, to renew it in his mind, a task that ends in a dead end.

== Translating Onitsha ==
Alison Anderson is the author of Darwin's Wink and the translator of seventeen books, including The Elegance of the Hedgehog, by Muriel Barbery. Anderson wrote about how it was for her to have translated Onitsha for the fall 1997 edition of World Literature Today

Onitsha was, as I may have already implied by now, a translator's dream. The language is fluid and evocative, not too difficult, clear and classical. This may seem obvious to readers of the original, but if I just cite some other examples of literature I have translated or looked at, I realize just how fortunate I have been to translate Le Clezio. I have done excerpts from Sylvie Germain's work, and it is extremely difficult – challenging, no doubt, but often near-impossible, leading to a kind of rapturous frustration for the translator, because the language is so baroque and rich, so very idiomatically French as well, that if one is not careful it quickly becomes unpalatable to the English reader. Either the poetry is lost, or one must betray the original: I found myself walking a real tightrope in working with her text.

Alison Anderson published her own synopsis of Onitsha

"Onitsha" is remarkable for its "almost mythological evocation of local history and beliefs." It is full of atmosphere – sights, sounds, smells – and at times the author's sentences seem to flow with the dreamy languor of the river itself. But J. M. G. Le Clezio "never lets us forget the harsh realities of life nor the subsequent tragedy of war." A startling account – and indictment – of colonialism, "Onitsha" is also a work of clear, forthright prose that ably portrays both colonial Nigeria and a young boy's growing outrage

== Publication history ==
=== First French Edition ===
- Le Clézio, J.M.G. (1991). Onitsha (in French). Paris: Gallimard ( Folio, 2472). p. 288. ISBN 978-2-07-038726-7.

=== First English translation ===
- Le Clezio, J. M. G.; translated by Alison Anderson (1997). Onitsha. Lincoln: University of Nebraska Press. pp. 206. ISBN 978-0-8032-7966-7.

=== Second English translation ===
- Le Clezio, J. M. G.; translated by Alison Anderson (1997). Onitsha. Bison Books. pp. 206. ISBN 978-0-8032-7966-7.
