= Terra Amata (novel) =

1967 novel by J. M. G. Le Clézio

- First English edition
- Author: J. M. G. Le Clézio
- Original title: Terra Amata
- Translator: Barbara Bray
- Language: French
- Genre: Novel
- Publisher: Gallimard (France); Hamish Hamilton (UK); Atheneum (US)
- Publication date: 1967
- Publication place: France
- English publication date: 1 January 1969
- Media type: Print (Paperback
- Pages: 248 pp
- ISBN: 2-07-023825-3
- OCLC: 248775313

Terra Amata is an early fictional novel by French Nobel laureate J. M. G. Le Clézio.

== Plot summary ==
Terra Amata is about a man named Chancelade, and his detailed view of an otherwise ordinary life, from his early childhood to his grave.

Terra Amata is an archaeological site near the French town of Nice.

== Critical reception ==
Terra Amata was perceived to center on the "perceptions and activities" of "its protagonist" Chancelade The work seems to have been "designed to overload the senses" According to one critic "Chancelade has done nothing, suffered nothing, experienced nothing to make him worth our regard." The story is that of Chancelade, from childhood to death; he sees the world in minute detail...""Terra Amata," combines Le Clézio's game-playing as the author with a savage lyricism reminiscent of Thomas Hardy.
