= Collection Blanche =

French literature

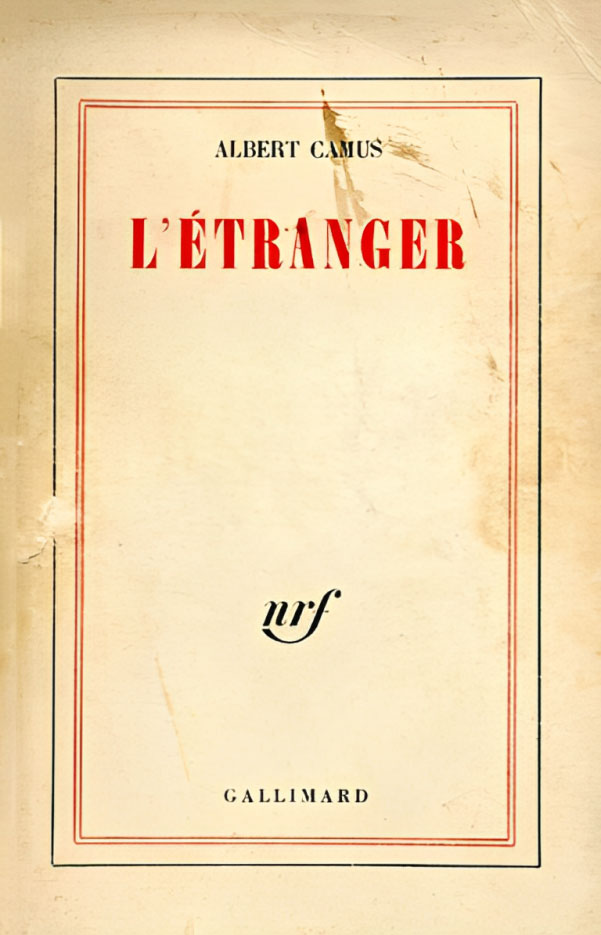
- Albert Camus' 1942 philosophical novel L'Étranger
- Author: Various authors
- Country: France
- Language: French
- Genre: Novel, theatre play, among others
- Publisher: Éditions Gallimard
- Published: 1911–present
- Media type: Print (paperback)

The Collection Blanche is the great collection of French literature published by the Éditions Gallimard.

It appeared in 1911, and at the beginning was nourished by the publications of La Nouvelle Revue française (La NRF), the brand "Librairie Gallimard" appeared only after July 1919. Since its creation, "La Blanche", which takes its name from the cream color of its cover, has published 6500 titles, of which 3800 are still available today.

In addition to the "NRF" logo originally designed by Jean Schlumberger, the graphic charter of this collection - a black border surrounding two red edges - is inspired by the éditions de La Phalange, with its first title, L'Otage by Paul Claudel, published 26 May 1911. Apart from classic literature like In Search of Lost Time, the "Blanche" also remains widely open to young novelists, beyond the sphere of influence of the director of La NRF.

For a time, the first printer of this collection was Verbeke, director of the "Imprimerie Sainte-Catherine", based in Bruges. The generic formats evolved very little over the years, which is a unique case in the history of French contemporary publishing, although the cream color changed to bright yellow filmed in the 1980s.

Champion of literary prizes, from 1911 to 2016 the collection has been awarded 33 prix Goncourt, 30 prix Femina, 17 prix Renaudot, 10 prix Médicis, 16 prix Interallié, 30 Grand prix du roman de l'Académie française and 4 prix du Livre Inter.
