= The Strand (radio programme) =

BBC daily arts show

- Genre: Public broadcasting
- Language: English
- Home station: BBC World Service
- Hosted by: Harriett Gilbert; Mark Coles; Anna McNamee; Bidisha
- Original release: 27 October 2008 – 29 March 2013
- Website: www.bbc.co.uk/programmes/p002vsn3

The Strand is the BBC World Service's daily arts show. It was launched on Monday 27 October 2008. The last weekday edition was aired on Friday 29 March 2013, and the last weekly summary on the subsequent weekend. It was regularly hosted by Harriett Gilbert, Mark Coles, Audrey Brown – who also presented the BBC's flagship African News and Current Affairs programmes Focus on Africa and Network Africa, Anna McNamee, and Bidisha. The programme's title came from the Strand, a busy street in London close to the World Service's former studios at Bush House on Aldwych.

== Format ==
Harriett Gilbert regularly presented the Monday and Friday editions, as well as (on the first Saturday of every month) the new hour-long version of long-standing BBC World Service programme World Book Club. She said of the new programme: "I'm delighted to be presenting The Strand. As a daily programme, it will be a great position to reveal, explore and debate developments as they happen in the world of the arts – including, of course, the world of literature."

Mark Coles, who previously hosted The Beat and The Ticket on the World Service, is also a music journalist and won the Sony Reporter of the Year Award in 1993.

The first programme featured: Roger Moore talking about his autobiography; a report on the cultural life available to the people of Gaza, in particular what people in Gaza are watching on satellite TV and how it affects their view of the world; a review of AC/DC's album Black Ice; and an interview with Steve McQueen about his film Hunger.

The Strand replaced a number of existing World Service arts programmes such as The Word, The Beat, On Screen, Culture Shock and The Ticket.

Editions were also presented by Lawrence Pollard, Louise Fryer, Rajan Datar, Tim Marlow, and Aminatta Forna.

Arts topics were subsequently integrated into the show Outlook, the duration of which was extended to one hour as of Monday 1 April 2013.

== World Book Club ==
World Book Club, an hour-long programme, occupies some of The Strand's slots in the schedule on the first Saturday in each month and during repeats on following days. Some of the "repeats" are a version edited to fit the usual half-hour slots of The Strand. World Book Club was previously a half-hour programme broadcast on the last Tuesday in each month, in the slot of now-defunct book programme The Word.

== See also ==
- World Book Club
