= Amnesty International UK Media Awards 1994 =

In total 6 awards were presented for National Print, Periodicals, Photojournalism, Radio, Television Documentary and Television News.

The overall winner was awarded for George Alagiah's report on Burundi, broadcast by BBC News.

The awards were hosted by Anna Ford.

== 1994 Awards ==
1994
Category	Title	Organisation	Journalists	Refs
National; Print
National; Print	"Who's Playing Hangman"	Times Magazine	Karen Muir	
Periodicals
Periodicals	"Angola"	The Face	Gavin Hills	
Photojournalism
Photojournalism	Work on Bosnia	Guardian and Observer.	Roger Hutchings	
Radio
Radio	"Refugees in UK Detention Centres"	BBC Radio 4 Face the Facts	John Waite	
Television; Documentary
Television; Documentary	"Laogai: Inside China's Gulag"	First Tuesday	Roger Finnigan; Tim Tate	
Television; News
Television; News	Report on Burundi	BBC News and Current Affairs	George Alagiah	
