= Hugh Bicheno =

British military historian

Hugh Bicheno (19 January 1948 – 11 November 2023) was a political risk analyst and an historian of conflict. He was best known for his interpretations of the Falklands War in Razor's Edge: The Unofficial History of the Falklands War and of the American Revolution in Rebels and Redcoats: The American Revolutionary War.

== Life ==
Hugh Bicheno was born in Cuba to British parents in 1948. He was educated in Cuba, Chile and Scotland before winning a scholarship to Emmanuel College, Cambridge, where he won a first class honours degree in history. He was first an academic and then worked as an MI6 officer, being stationed in Buenos Aires during the Dirty War.

Later he became a security consultant specialising in kidnap negotiations and was the adviser in 27 cases. He lived in Italy and then in Guatemala before moving to the United States for several years and becoming a naturalised citizen. He returned to England to pursue his life-long ambition to write books about conflict. He was bilingual English-Spanish, spoke and read Italian and French.

== Writing ==
Reviewing Razor's Edge, the late and eminent military historian Sir John Keegan commented that "It may seem impossible for anything original to appear about the Falklands War, so much has been written about it, but Hugh Bicheno's book is that thing . . . readers will find this book gripping and discomfiting."

Sir Max Hastings, who took part in the campaign as a journalist and co-wrote the first and still highly regarded account of the war, commented: "Bicheno understands how battles are fought, and explains those of the Falklands better than any other writer has done . . . he knows how soldiers fight battles and has done us all a service by explaining them so well for a new generation."

Bicheno collaborated with his friend the late Richard Holmes on Battlefields of the Second World War, In the Footsteps of Churchill and The World at War. Holmes wrote the prefaces to Rebels and Redcoats and Razor's Edge and also made a television series adaptation of Rebels and Redcoats.

== Works ==
- Gettysburg (Cassell, 2001) ISBN 0-304-35698-0
- Midway (Cassell, 2001) ISBN 0-304-35715-4
- Rebels & Redcoats: The American Revolutionary War (HarperCollins 2003) ISBN 0-00-715625-1
- Crescent and Cross: The Battle of Lepanto, 1571 (Cassell, 2003) ISBN 0-304-36319-7
- Razor's Edge: The Unofficial History of the Falklands War (Weidenfeld & Nicolson, 2006) ISBN 0-297-84633-7
- Vendetta: High Art and Low Cunning at the Birth of the Renaissance (Weidenfeld & Nicolson, 2008) ISBN 978-0-297-84634-5
- Elizabeth's Sea Dogs: How the English Became the Scourge of the Seas (Conway, 2012) ISBN 978-1-844-86174-3
- Battle Royal: the Wars of Lancaster and York 1440-1462 (Head of Zeus, 2015) ISBN 978-1-781-85965-0
- Blood Royal: the Wars of Lancaster and York 1462-1485 (Head of Zeus, 2016) ISBN 978-1-781-85968-1
- The Wars of the Roses (Head of Zeus, 2019) ISBN 978-1-789-54472-5
