= The Prince of Mist =

1993 novel by Carlos Ruiz Zafón

- 2006 edition book cover
- Author: Carlos Ruiz Zafón
- Original title: El Príncipe de la Niebla
- Translator: Lucia Graves
- Cover artist: Constantino Gatagán
- Language: Spanish
- Genre: Mystery, Horror novel
- Publisher: Editorial Planeta, Little, Brown Books for Young Readers
- Publication date: 1993
- Publication place: Spain
- English publication date: 2010
- Media type: Print (hardcover)
- Pages: 221 pp
- ISBN: 978-0-06-128438-0 (first edition)
- OCLC: 77563536

The Prince of Mist (Spanish: El Príncipe de la Niebla) is a 1993 mystery and horror young adult novel by Carlos Ruiz Zafón. It was initially published in Spanish by Editorial Planeta and later in an English translation by Lucia Graves by Little, Brown Books for Young Readers in 2010. The Prince of Mist was Zafón's first novel.

== Plot summary ==
It is June 1943, and 13-year-old Max Carver, son of a watchmaker, has moved with his family from the city to get away from World War II. Max's new house was formerly owned by Richard Fleischman. Max experiences mysterious events which have to do with his son, Jacob Fleischman, who had drowned. Over time, Max discovers a sculpture garden near his house, where strange things happen. Max finally makes a friend, Roland, who is older than Max, around the age of his sister, Alicia, who is 15. After diving near the wreck, the Orpheus, Max has more and more questions, which will be answered by Victor Kray, grandfather of Roland.

Chapter 1

The story opens in 1943 in an unnamed city. It is mid-June, the day of the protagonist, Max Carver's, thirteenth birthday. Maximilian Carver, Max's father, and an eccentric watchmaker, tells Max and his family that they are leaving their lives in the city, which is suffering a war, to live in a town on the coast. We meet the family: Andrea Carver, Max's mother, and Max's sisters: Alicia, the elder, and Irina the younger. They reluctantly accept their fate, although Max is especially unhappy about having to leave his friends in the city. Before retiring to bed, Mr. Carver gives Max his birthday present: a watch made by his father, with an engraving on the back that says, Max's time machine. They arrive at the train station, and Max sees that the station clock is slow. His father jokes that he has work already. Mr. Carver finds, and then employs two men, Robin and Philip, to help the family carry and transport their luggage. Max feels someone watching him, and turns to see a large cat with luminous yellow eyes watching him. The cat befriends Irina, who takes an immediate liking to the creature; she begs her parents to let her bring it with them, and they eventually concede. Before they leave the station, Max notices that the clock is even further behind than he had thought, but as he watches it for a moment, he realizes it is actually turning backwards.

Chapter 2

As they drive through the town, the family begins to warm up to the sights, noticeably calmed by tranquil coastal setting. Maximilian Carver is delighted by his family's reactions, and visibly enthused about their new lives on the coast. Max gazes at the ocean, which is covered by a light mist, and thinks he sees the silhouette of a ship sailing on the horizon. But it quickly disappears. On the way to their new home, Mr. Carver tells them the history of the house. It was built in 1923 by Dr. Richard Fleischmann, and he lived there with his wife, Eva. They had a son, Jacob, on June 23, 1925. The family lived happily until the tragedy of 1932, when Jacob drowned playing on the beach near his home. After that, Dr. Fleischmann's health deteriorated, and after he had died, his widow, Eva, left the house to her lawyers to sell, and fled elsewhere. When they arrive, the porters leave quickly, and before they have even taken their first steps into the house, the cat leaps from Irina's arms, letting out a satisfied meow as it is the first to touch down in the foyer. The home is musty and dusty, so the family sets out cleaning it up. The girls are horrified to find huge spiders in their rooms, so Max is charged with disposing of them. Before he can terminate a terrible-looking one, the cat aggressively devours it. Max looks out the window, and beyond the yard, and can vaguely make out a small clearing enclosed by a wall of stone. Inside, there appears to be an overgrown garden, with a circle of stone figures – statues. The wall enclosure is secured with spearhead points along its edge, each embossed with a symbol of a six-pointed star enclosed in a circle.

Chapter 3

Max awakes with a start from a bad dream the next morning. Outside, dawn is breaking, and the air is clouded with a hazy mist. No one else is awake, and he decides to go outside and explore the mysterious garden he had observed through the window the night before. He must break a lock to access the garden, and he is overcome with a foreboding feeling as he enters. Inside, he discovers the statues depict ominous-looking circus characters, including a lion tamer, a contortionist, a fakir, a strong man, and some other ghostly characters, all are arranged in a star pattern around one central figure on a pedestal: a terrible clown, with arms outstretched and hands in a fist. At the clown's feet, Max sees another small paving stone with the same six-pointed star inside of a circle inscribed on its surface. Max looks up again, and sees the hand of the clown is now open to the sky. Afraid, he flees back to the house, not looking back. Finding his family now awake and preparing breakfast, Max decides not to tell them what he has seen because he knows they will be skeptical, and he doesn’t want to crush his father's excitement about their new home. Maximilian Carver eagerly tells the family about his own discovery in the shed outside: an old projector and a box of old films, as well as two bicycles.

Chapter 4

Max helps his father restore the old bicycles and they discover they have barely been used. He asks his father casually about the garden out back, but his father doesn’t give much of a response. Max takes his bike for a ride, and begins to explore the town. Soon, he meets a boy a few years older than he is, named Roland, who is also out riding his bike. Roland offers to show him around, and Max takes him up on the offer. The two pedal around town for hours, and Max is barely able to keep up with the older boy, but enjoys the tour nonetheless. They rest, and Roland tells him about a ship that sunk off the coast in 1918; the wreckage remains underwater. The sole survivor of the shipwreck was an engineer who, as a way of thanking providence for saving his life, settled in the town and built a lighthouse on the cliffs overlooking where the ship had sunk. That man is Roland's adoptive grandfather, Victor Kray; Roland's own parents were killed in a car accident when he was a baby, and they had entrusted Roland to Victor's care in their will. Before the boys part ways, Roland invites Max to go diving with him and explore the shipwreck the next day. Max accepts the offer, and Roland promises to pick him up the next morning. At home, Max finds a note from his mother and a plate of sandwiches awaiting him. His parents have gone into town with Irina, and Alicia is nowhere in sight. Outside, rain begins to fall, and Max retires to his room for a nap.

Chapter 5

Max awakes to the sound of his family downstairs, and he goes down to join them for dinner. He tells them about the friend he’d made that day, and even invites his older sister, Alicia, to join him and Roland in their dive the next day. To his surprise, Alicia accepts the invitation. After dinner, Maximilian sets up the old projector he had salvaged that morning, and the family settles in to watch one of the unmarked films from the box. As the movie begins, they see it is a homemade movie, and the scene begins in a forest. The scene takes them through the trees, and a silhouette begins to appear, as the camera approaches an enclosed garden – the very garden Max had visited that morning. The camera operator enters the garden, revealing the mysterious statues, which look new, unlike the weathered state Max had observed them in. When the scene moves to the clown, Max feels something is different from the way he had observed it that morning, but he can’t decide what it is, and the film ends suddenly. Disappointed with their cinematic experience, the family retires to bed. Max decides to stay up and watch another film. Alicia waits for the rest of the family to leave, and she looks distraught. She tells Max she has seen the clown from the movie before – which she dreamed of that exact clown the night before they had moved to their new home. Max assures her she is probably just imagining the similarity and encourages her to forget about it. Alicia agrees he is probably right, and she goes to bed. Feeling unsettled by what Alicia told him, Max suddenly feels a presence behind him. He turns suddenly, and sees Irina's cat looking at him with its yellow eyes. He shoos it away, but before leaving, it seems to smile at him. Max decides to put the projector and films back into the box and then go to bed.

Chapter 6

Alicia wakes before sunrise with two golden feline eyes staring at her. She ignores the animal and thinks about her friends in the city, as she gets dressed. Max knocks on the door to tell her Roland has arrived. She joins the boys outside and there is an instant connection between Roland and Alicia, who are the same age. Knowing there is an extra bike in the garage, Max enjoys the flirtatious scene, and tells Alicia she will have to balance on Roland's handlebars down to the beach. At the beach, Roland shows them his shack, where he sleeps during the summers. The inside is filled with trinkets and treasures that Roland has recovered from his dives down to the shipwreck just off shore. The boys prepare for their dive and Alicia waits on shore. Max is mesmerized by the experience of the cool water, and the serene silence beneath the surface of the ocean, but he leaves the deep diving to his friend. Roland discovers some new treasures, while Max observes from a distance, noticing the ship's name inscribed on the bow, the Orpheus. Through the water, he dimly sees an old, tattered flag ebbing with the current. As it unfurls, horror seizes Max as he recognizes the symbol he had seen in the garden of a six-pointed star enclosed in a circle. He immediately swims back to the beach. When Roland joins the Carver children on the beach, Alicia begins collecting seashells, and once she is out of earshot, Max tells Roland about the symbol and the circus figures. Alicia returns to the boys and begins to ask Roland about his grandfather and the ship. Roland invites them into the cabin and promises to tell them the full story there. Meanwhile, back at the Carver home, we learn that Irina has been hearing voices in the house, and now hears them in her room, much like a whisper in the walls. It seems to be coming from her wardrobe, and as she approaches it, she sees there is a key in the lock. She hurriedly turns it to the locked position, and steps back. The sound continues, and hearing her mother calling her, Irina turns to run from the room. An icy breeze sweeps past her and slams the door shut, and she struggles with the handle, looking over her shoulder. She sees the key slowly turning; the voices become louder, and she hears laughter... Back in Roland's shack, Roland tells Alicia and Max more about the Orpheus, retelling all that his grandfather, Victor Kray, has told him about the accident, and the events leading up to it. The Orpheus began as a cargo ship with a bad reputation, operated by a corrupt Dutchman who rented the ship out to anyone who would pay, including smugglers and criminals. The Dutchman was also a gambler, and he had accumulated a lot of debt, which made him desperate to gamble more. He lost a big card game to a man named Mr. Cain, who owned a travelling circus, known for employing shady criminals. Knowing the police were closing in on he and his group's criminal activities, Mr. Cain charged The Dutchman with transporting his evil posse across the Channel on his ship, and the man agreed. Roland's grandfather had the misfortune of knowing Mr. Cain for some time, and had unfinished business of some sort with him. He did not want Mr. Cain to leave the town without settling things with Victor first, so hearing of his plot to escape the town, he boarded the Orpheus as a stowaway, not even sure what he would do when he confronted Mr. Cain. He wouldn’t have to, as it turned out, as the ship crashed, and Mr. Cain and all of the other passengers on the ship were killed, save Victor, who was spared thanks to the hiding place he had chosen – a lifeboat. But they never found any bodies. Max and Alicia point out that something seemed to be missing from Victor Kray's story, and Roland agrees... Back at the Carver house, Irina feels her hands go numb, and she continues to fumble with the door, and she watches in horror as the key turns in the lock, finally stops moving, and is then pushed out of the keyhole, falling to the floor. The wardrobe begins to creak open, and Irina tries to scream as a shape emerges from the wardrobe – the cat. She kneels to pick it up, but then notices something behind the cat, deeper in the wardrobe. The cat opens its jaws and hisses at her, then retreats back into the wardrobe, and a giant smile filled with light appears in the darkness with two glowing golden eyes, and all of the voices she has been hearing say “Irina” in unison. Irina screams and throws herself against the bedroom door, which gives away, and she stumbles into the hallway, and hurls herself down the stairs. Downstairs, Andrea Carver has heard her daughter's scream, and runs to the base of the stairs just in time to see her child tumbling down to the bottom, a tear of blood escaping from her forehead. Mrs. Carver feels her pulse, and finding it is weak, calls the doctor. Holding her unconscious child, she looks up the stairs to see the cat watching her coldly.

Chapter 7

When they return to the house, Max and Alicia see an unfamiliar car in the driveway, which Roland recognizes as the car of the town Doctor, Dr. Roberts. Their father tells them about Irina's accident, and explains that he and Mrs. Carver will go with Irina to the hospital. Max and Alicia assure him that they will be fine. The three friends eat a simple dinner on the porch, and then Alicia and Roland decide to go swimming. Max sits on the porch, and thinks about the bond between his sister and new friend. He recalls Roland telling him that he may be sent to the war at the end of the summer, and he fears the effect that will have on his sister. After the swim, Alicia and Roland and Max build a bonfire on the beach, and discuss the strange occurrences and discoveries of the past few days, and Max reveals a final mystery: the Fleischmann film of the statues revealed the figures situated in different positions than Max had seen in the present day. Roland reveals a secret too: he has dreamed about the clown figure every summer since he was five. They all agree they will speak with Victor Kray the next day to learn more about the shipwreck.

Chapter 8

The teens stay up until daybreak, and then Roland rides his bike home, while Max and Alicia retire to bed. The scene moves to Victor Kray returning from the lighthouse. He enters his home quietly, and finds his grandson waiting for him in an armchair. They make breakfast together, and Roland begins to tell him about his new friends that live in the Fleischmanns’ old house, and the strange happenings. His grandfather listens and tells him to find his friends and bring them to the lighthouse.

Chapter 9

Back at the Carver's house, Maximilian has phoned his children to tell them Irina is in a coma, but is expected to wake up. Roland appears on the scene and asks Max and Alicia to come to his grandfather's home. Victor Kray recounts for them a story very similar to the one Roland told about the shipwreck, but he also reveals some new facts. He explains the “unfinished business” between him and the wickedness Mr. Cain. They had met when they were boys, when the villain went simply by the name Cain. He was a notorious cheat at dice and cards in the town where Victor grew up, and the neighbourhood boys referred to him as the Prince of Mist because, rumour had it, he appeared out of a haze in dark alleyways at night and disappeared again before dawn. He had a reputation for making young boys’ wishes come true in exchange for their undying “loyalty.” Victor never succumbed to the temptation of expressing his wishes to Cain, but Victor's best friend, Angus, did. Angus’ father had lost his job, and he asked Cain to restore the family's only source of income. Inexplicably, his father was rehired the next day. Two weeks later, Victor and Angus were walking on the train tracks at night when they ran into Cain. Cain told them Angus would have to burn down the local grocery store. Victor and Angus ran home, but Victor knew Angus would not fulfill the request. But the next morning when Victor went to Angus’ house, he was not there, and no one could find him. Victor searched the city, and then returned to the train tracks where they’d run into Cain. There, he found the frozen corpse of his friend's body – transforming into smoky blue ice, and melting into the tracks. Around his neck was a chain with a symbol of a six-pointed star in a circle. That same night, the grocery store Cain had demanded that Angus burn down was destroyed by a fire. Victor never told anyone what he knew, and his family moved south a few weeks later.

Chapter 10

Victor continues to tell of his knowledge of Cain, recounting another encounter that took place a few months later, when his father took Victor to an amusement park. Waiting for the Ferris Wheel, Victor became aware of a tent being touted as the den of “Dr. Cain – fortune-teller, magician and clairvoyant.” Reluctantly, Victor gave into his curiosity and entered the tent, where Dr. Cain immediately recognized him and called him by name. He asked him his wish, but Victor wouldn’t tell him. He spoke boldly to Cain, and accused him of killing his friend. Cain denied the incident, describing it as an “unfortunate accident.” When Victor left the tent, he resolved never to see the man again. For many years, he didn’t. He went to college, and befriended a man named Richard Fleischmann and a woman named Eva Gray. Both Victor and Richard were in love with Eva, but the three remained friends. One night, Richard and Victor went out drinking and ended up at a fair. They stumbled upon a fortune-teller's tent, and Richard wanted to go in and ask whether Eva would eventually choose one of the men for her husband. Despite his drunken stupor, Victor refused to go inside, knowing it would be the evil Dr. Cain, but his friend rushed in. Victor fell asleep outside on a bench. When he woke up, it was daylight, the fair was being cleaned up, and Richard was asleep on the bench next to him. The two had a terrible hangover, and barely remembered the night before. Richard told Victor that he dreamt he went into a magician's tent and was asked what his greatest wish was. He said he wanted to marry Eva Gray. Two months later, Eva Gray and Richard Fleischmann were married. They didn’t invite Victor to the wedding, and Victor didn’t see them for twenty years. Decades later, Victor noticed someone suspicious following him home. It turned out to be Richard, his old friend. Richard looked terrible, and began to cry as he recounted his memories from the night at the fair, finally revealing what he had promised the magician in exchange for his wish for Eva's love: his first-born son. Richard described to Victor how he’d been trying desperately to keep Eva from becoming pregnant, but that she wanted a child so badly that their lack of one was driving her into depression. Victor agrees to help Richard by tracking down Cain. He finds Cain with a circus troupe, now in a clown façade, just as they are preparing to escape on the Dutchman's ship. Victor climbed aboard and hid himself in a lifeboat. Fierce winds picked up, and the storm soon took over. As Roland had told his friends the day before, Victor was the only known survivor of the shipwreck, and the other bodies were never found. Hearing that Victor had constructed and moved into a lighthouse on the cliffs, Richard visited him one day, and Victor told him what had happened. Overcome with relief, Richard stopped preventing Eva from having a child, and began building a home for them on the beach. A few years later, their baby boy, Jacob, was born. The couple enjoyed the best years of their lives with their child, until he drowned. When Victor heard, he knew the Prince of Mist had never really left their lives, and he has feared his return ever since.

Chapter 11

When Victor finishes his story, a storm is closing in. Max still thinks some facts are missing from Victor's story, but can’t determine where the holes are. Alicia and Roland seem sceptical of the whole story Victor has told, questioning whether the old man has begun to lose his mind. That night, Max and Alicia have a quiet supper together, their parents still at the hospital. Alicia goes to bed, and Max decides to watch another of the Fleischmann films. The film shows the face of a clock turning backwards, hanging from a chain. The camera zooms out, and we see the pocket watch is being held by a statue in the walled garden. The scene scans the faces of the statues, landing finally on the Prince of Mist – the clown. The camera pans down and reveals the motionless statue of a cat at its feet, its claw poised in the air. Max remembers that cat wasn’t there when he’d visited the garden, and notices the likeness between the statue and Irina's cat. The camera goes back to the clown's stone face, and it slowly smiles, revealing wolf-like fangs.

Chapter 12

The next morning, Max wakes at noon and Alicia has left a note, saying that she is at the beach with Roland. He rides his bike to town and eats at a bakery, and then rides to where Roland's Shack sits on the beach. He sees Roland and Alicia kissing, and feels silly approaching them, so he rides his bike back into town. He goes the library, finds a map of the town, and locates the graveyard. He rides his bike there to visit the tomb of Jacob Fleischmann. The cemetery is big and quiet. He finds a dark mausoleum devoted to Jacob Fleischmann, and enters the tomb. Under Jacob's name, he finds the six-pointed star symbol engraved. He feels eerie in the tomb, and suddenly senses he is not alone in the darkness; he sees a stone angel walking on the ceiling above him, and it points at him slowly and then gives an evil smile, transforming into the face of the evil clown, Dr. Cain. Max saw burning hatred in its eyes, and filled with fear, ran from the tomb. Afterwards, he realized he had dropped the watch his father had given him, but he was too afraid to go back and retrieve it. He rides to Victor's lighthouse, and tells him what happened. Then he accuses the man of keeping some of the truth from Max and his friends, but Victor Kray denies it, and tells Max to forget the whole thing. Victor looks pained to shut him out, but asks Max to leave.

Chapter 13

The next morning, Max gets up before dawn and rides to the town bakery to get breakfast for himself and Alicia. Later, they meet Roland at the beach, and he shows them a small rowboat he has restored. They go out in the boat, and Roland and Alicia prepare to dive down. Alicia enjoys being beneath the water with Roland, but then Roland spots a giant black shadow approaching them, and begins rushing Alicia back to the boat. A gigantic eel-like figure rapidly follows them, but Roland gets Alicia to the boat before the figure snatches him with jagged teeth and drags him into the sea. Seeing his sister is safe, Max impulsively dives in after his friend, and is able to rescue him from the frightening creature, even as it transforms into the face of an evil clown. Roland wakes up in the boat, choking, and knows Max has saved his life. Back on shore, the three friends are exhausted and they fall asleep in Roland's shack.

Chapter 14

The scene opens with Victor Kray sneaking through the Carvers’ yard, toward the garden enclosure. He has his old revolver with him, and when he enters the garden, the statues are gone. He hears the rumble of a storm, a flash of lightning splits the sky, and Victor suddenly understands what will happen. Max wakes up in Roland's shack, and realizes he needs to be proactive about predicting Cain's next move. He rides his bike back home and begins watching another film. This movie begins in the living room where Max sits, but with different furniture, and everything looking new. The camera moves up the stairs, and into the room that Irina had occupied before her accident. The door opens, the camera enters the room, focusing on the wardrobe. Dr. Cain emerges from the wardrobe with an evil smile, and reveals a pocket watch, with its hands spinning backwards. Max recognizes it as the watch his father gave him for his birthday, and the one he had dropped in Jacob's tomb earlier that day. The hands move faster and faster until they start to smoke and spark, and soon the whole face of the clock is ablaze. The camera moves away from the clock and films a mirror, revealing the camera operator as a small boy. Max looks at the boy's childish grin, and realizes he looks familiar: it's Roland as a child. A flash of lightning catches Max's eye outside and when he looks out the window, he sees a dark figure there: Victor Kray.

Chapter 15

Max lets Victor in and makes a cup of tea to warm him. Victor is shaking as he tells Max the statues are gone, and asks where Roland is. Max tells Victor his suspicion that Roland is Jacob Fleischmann, and Victor tells him he doesn’t understand what's happening, but Max insists Victor tell him the truth. The old man explains that when Richard had thought Cain had drowned and built the house on the beach, things had been fine for a long time, until Jacob went missing one day when he was five. When night fell, Richard searched the forest, remembering an old stone enclosure that had been there when he was building the house. He searched the enclosure, and found Jacob. He was playing amongst the ominous statues that Richard was certain weren’t there when he built the home. Richard never told his wife about this or his encounter with the magician so many years before. One night, Victor was manning the lighthouse, as usual, when he had a sudden premonition that Jacob was in danger. He ran to the Fleischmann house, and to the beach. He saw Jacob wading into the water, as if entranced by a mysterious water monster that was dimly visible in the mist off shore. He looked to the house, and saw some of the circus statues were holding Mr. and Mrs. Fleischmann, who were desperately fighting to save their son. The creature began dragging the boy into the sea, but Victor chased it, and rescued Jacob from its clenches, taking him back to the surface. He tried to revive him, but he was gone. The statues disappeared the moment the Victor realized the boy was dead. Fleischmann was beside himself with grief, and ran into the ocean shouting to Cain, offering his own life in exchange for the life of his son. Then, inexplicably, Jacob sputtered back to life. He was in shock and did not remember his own name. Eva took him inside, and Victor followed, while Richard remained outside. Eva asked Victor to take the boy, hoping that his life would be out of danger if he had a different identity. They let the townspeople think that Jacob had drowned, and the body was never found. A year later, Richard died from a deadly infection he caught from being bitten by a wild dog. Victor explains that the tomb at the local cemetery was built by Cain, who is reserving it for the day he recovers Jacob's body... Meanwhile, Alicia and Roland wake at the beach shack to find a thick mist creeping under the door and filling the shack. It becomes a tentacle and begins pulling on Roland. An evil clown appears in the mist, and says “Hello, Jacob.” The mist grabs Alicia and begins to pull her toward the sea. Both she and Roland try to fight the mist, but to no avail. Roland stands helplessly on the beach, watching as the Orpheus begins to rise from the water, and float upright. Roland hears maniacal laughter, and sees Dr. Cain standing on the ship, grinning as the tentacle of mist drops Alicia at his feet.

Chapter 16

Max joins Roland on the beach and begins screaming at Cain; Roland dives into the waves and swims towards the Orpheus. Cain drags Alicia to a cabin and locks her in, where she finds the corpse of the former captain of the ship, The Dutchman. Max makes climbs on some nearby rocks to get closer to the ship, and is able to jump on board, while Roland struggled to grab hold of the helm and steer the vessel away from the rocks. Meanwhile, Victor arrives at Roland's hut, and something strikes him in the back of the head, knocking him unconscious. Max encounters Cain, who brags to him of his exploits, and Max attempts to indulge him, hoping to give Roland time to find Alicia. But they hear Roland calling Alicia's name, and Cain realizes what Max was trying to do. Cain flings Max into the sea, and he is able to scramble onto some rocks.

Chapter 17

Cain and Alicia have another encounter, and he tries to convince her to promise him her first-born child in exchange for Roland's life. She tells him to go to Hell, and he say, “my dear girl, that’s exactly where I’ve come from,” (200.) The ship is sinking, and Roland is still searching for Alicia when he encounters Cain, who keeps calling him Jacob. Roland still has not made the connection, since he cannot remember his life before his parents died, but he plays along, asking Cain what he has to do to save Alicia's life. Cain says, “I hope you’ll carry out the part of the agreement your father was unable to fulfill… Nothing more. And nothing less” (203.) Tears in his eyes, Roland agrees. Cain tells Roland where Alicia is, and explains that it's already underwater and she won’t be able to breathe by the time he reaches her. He finds the room, takes a deep breath, and searches her out in the darkness. He waits for the ship to touch the bottom of the sea so that the pressure will not pull them back down; when the impact came, the ceiling above began collapsing on top of them, and Roland's leg was pinned beneath the woody debris. Alicia was struggling to hold her breath, so Roland pulled her to him, and though she tried to resist, he breathed the last of his air into her mouth and then pushed her away towards the surface. Max helps Alicia out of the water; Victor wakes up on the beach and helps the two of them ashore, asking, “Where’s my Roland?” (207.) Roland never returned.

Chapter 18

The day after the storm, Maximilian and Alicia Carver returned to the beach house with young Irina, who had fully recovered. It was clear to the parents that Max and Alicia had been through a great ordeal, but they didn’t ask, and the teens didn’t tell. Max accompanies Victor Kray to the train station, and Victor tells him he won’t be returning to the town. Before he leaves, he gives Max a small box. Max waits until Victor is gone before he opens it, and inside, he finds the keys to the lighthouse.

Epilogue

In the last weeks of summer, the war is nearing its end. Maximilian's watchmaking business is booming, and Max cycles to the lighthouse every day to ensure the lantern is lit to help guide ships safely to shore. He often sees Alicia alone near Roland's shack on the beach, gazing into the sea. Max remembers Roland's words about worrying that this would be his last summer in the town, and comforts himself with the thought that the memories Roland, Max and Alicia shared, will bind them forever.

== Awards and nominations ==
The novel has won several awards, including the Edebé Literary Prize for Young Adult Fiction and the C.C.I.I. Award in 1994. The Prince of Mist was also one of the American Library Association's picks for "Best Fiction for Young Adults" for 2011.

== Reception ==
Critical reception for The Prince of Mist was positive, with the Irish Independent praising the novel as "a chilling adventure". Monsters and Critics also praised the book, writing that it was "a gripping tale with a heart-wrenching conclusion". The Manila Bulletin lauded the book as "a worthy forerunner to Zafon’s bestsellers".

The Independent stated that although the book was rushed and overly explained in places, "the main story remains gripping enough".

=== Cultural influence ===
Mexican heavy metal band Velvet Darkness published a song titled "The Prince of Mist" on their debut EP Delusion based on Ruiz Zafon's novel.
