= A Good Read =

BBC Radio 4 book review programme

A Good Read is one of BBC Radio 4's longest-running programmes in which two guests join the main presenter to choose and discuss their favourite books.

The programme grew out of an occasional slot on Weekend Woman's Hour, initiated in 1970. Between 1976 and 1978 Amanda Theunissen hosted three guests in an early version of the format. On 1 July 1979, billed as a new series, John Hale was the presenter of the programme in its current 30-minute format, with two guests. Subsequent presenters included Theresa McGonagle (1980–1984), Brian Gear (1985–1988), Edward Blishen (1989–1997), Louise Doughty (1998–2001) and Sue MacGregor (2003–2010).

Since 2011, A Good Read has been presented by the writer, broadcaster and academic Harriett Gilbert, now the programme's longest serving presenter. Gilbert had been the host of World Book Club on the BBC World Service since 2002, which she continues to present.

Collectively the panellists review their chosen titles. The books are always in-print paperbacks and affordable, and the reviews are honest and genuinely driven by the taste of the guests. Recently the programme has reviewed graphic novels and books available on the internet. It is not unusual for a guest to find themselves alone in defending their choice. Audiences see it as a simple but effective way of getting recommendations for books to read, with publishers keen to have their books featured on the programme.

The programme has been produced by BBC Bristol over its lifetime. It is a deceptively hard programme to present as the presenter needs to read around 30 books – cover to cover – over a 12-week period and nearly 100 books for the programme in a year.
