= National Trust Magazine =

UK magazine

- Editor: Sally Palmer
- Total circulation (Jan-Dec 2016): 2,310,299
- Country: United Kingdom
- Language: English

National Trust Magazine is the members’ publication of National Trust for Places of Historic Interest or Natural Beauty. With a readership of over 4 million (ABC 2,165,142) it currently has the highest magazine circulation in Britain. Three issues are sent out every year - spring, summer and autumn – and are delivered as part of the National Trust members’ mailout, which includes local newsletters and other information for Trust members.

== History ==
The first issue appeared in May 1932 and featured the Trust’s newest acquisition, Montacute House, on the cover. It was 8 pages long and titled ‘The National Trust Bulletin’.

Over time the magazine has been variously known as,

- 1932–1935: The National Trust Bulletin
- 1935–1939: National Trust News
- 1939: The Trust in War-Time
- 1947: National Trust Newsletter (the first Trust publication since 1939 due to wartime paper shortages)
- 1948: National Trust News Bulletin
- 1948–1954: News Bulletin
- 1955–1967: News Letter
- 1968–1970: Newsletter to members of The National Trust
- 1971–1973: National Trust News
- 1973–1985: National Trust
- 1985–Present: The National Trust Magazine

The number of issues has varied from 1 to 4 per year, although since 1984 the magazine has been tri-annual. The current numbering system considers issue number 1 to be the spring 1968 issue (numbered as such due to a redesign in that year). In fact 50 issues preceded the spring 1968 edition; therefore the summer 2016 magazine was the 218th National Trust Members’ publication.

== Staff ==
Previous editors include

- Robin Wright: 1982–1985
- Lawrence Rich: 1985–1988
- Sarah Jane Forder: 1989–1996
- Amanda Evans: ‘acting editor’ autumn 1996
- Gina Guarnieri: 1997–1999
- Anne Johnson: autumn 1999
- Gaynor Aaltonen: 2000–2006
- Sue Herdman: 2006–2012
- Clare Gogerty: spring 2013
- Debbie Schrieber 'acting editor' summer 2013
- Sally Palmer: 2013–present

The team has variously included Executive Editors, News Editors, Deputy Editors, Art Directors over the years. Currently the magazine employs three full-time editorial staff: the Editor and two Assistant Editors, as well as a Content Researcher who is employed by National Trust Images. It also employs freelance designers, a sub-editor and proof reader.

== Content ==
The magazine features articles on interiors, gardens, landscape, wildlife, family, food, environment and all areas of National Trust life.

Regular pages

Seasonal View

A double-page picture feature, encapsulating the season.

News

A round-up of the top stories and events from inside the Trust, with columns by the Director General and other key staff.

From You

Letters, emails and pictures from members.

Trust on screen

The latest filming news from Trust places.

Shopping

Highlights from the latest Trust retail ranges.

How to

Guide to re-creating a Trust feature in your own home or garden.

Bookshelf

The latest books, videos and apps from the Trust.

Crossword

The enduringly popular prize crossword.

In conversation with

Each issue we have a chat with someone from the Trust.

== In the news ==
The National Trust Magazine has sparked features in broadsheets, such as the Telegraph (on the story of Ferguson’s Gang), and the Sunday Times (following a feature on Slavery).

== Advertising ==
The very first advert to appear in the magazine was in the 1968 issue. Redactive handle the advertising for the magazine today.

== Talking Magazine ==
An audio version of each issue is produced. The talking magazine is presented by John Waite, and regularly features the voices of Malcolm Billings, Louise Fryer, Brian Perkins, Libby Purves, and Charlotte Green. In addition to features, which are read aloud, extra studio interviews and outside broadcasts are conducted with authors, Trust staff, and figures mentioned in the magazine.

== Contributors ==
Notable contributors to the magazine have included:

- Anthony Blunt
- James Lees-Milne
- Alan Titchmarsh
- Clough Williams-Ellis
- George Trevelyan
- Graham Stuart Thomas
- Peter Thornton
- Nigel Nicolson
- Robert Lassam
- Sir Alan Bowness CBE
- David Bellamy
- Nicholas Wollaston
- Hunter Davies
- Sue Arnold
- Jancis Robinson
- Gervase Jackson-Stops
- Anna Pavord
- Miles Kington
- Libby Purves
- Jonathon Porritt
- Rumer Godden
- Max Egremont
- Roy Lancaster
- Brian Redhead
- Richard Mabey
- Maev Kennedy
- Simon Jenkins
- Patrick Wright
- Colin Luckhurst

More recent contributors include:

- Robert Macfarlane
- Billy Bragg
- Benedict Blathwayt
- Lars Tharp
- Dan Cruickshank
- Kate Colquhoun
- Anthony Lambert
- Marcel Theroux
- John Vidal
- Clement Freud
- Rosie Boycott
- Jonathan Meades
- Rachel Johnson
- Adam Nicolson
- Oz Clarke
- Michael Holroyd
- Anish Kapoor

== Photography ==
- Joe Cornish
- John Millar
- Paul Harris
- Megan Taylor
- Oskar Proctor
- Sylvaine Poitau
- Chris Lacey
- James Dobson
- William Shaw
- Layton Thompson
- Cristian Barnett
- Andrew Montgomery

== Summer 2016 new-look ==
From the summer 2016 issue National Trust Magazine updated its design and structure, following reader research. It features improved navigation and a cleaner layout. New content includes fun pages for children and highlights of events across the UK. The aim is to help readers to make the most of their membership and find out more about the Trust’s work looking after special places forever, for everyone.
