= World Book Club =

- Country of origin: United Kingdom
- Language: English
- Home station: BBC World Service

World Book Club is a radio programme on the BBC World Service. Each edition of the programme, which is broadcast on the first Saturday of the month with repeats into the following Monday, features a famous author discussing one of their books, often the most well-known one, with the public. Since the programme began in 2002 it has been presented by Harriett Gilbert .

== History ==
World Book Club features a famous writer who answers questions submitted by the public about one of their books. It is usually recorded in front of a live audience. Listeners around the world can submit questions before the recording.

The programme was launched at the Edinburgh Festival in 2002. The first book featured was Lake Wobegon Days by Garrison Keillor.

Until November 2008 it was a half-hour programme broadcast on the last Tuesday of each month in the slot of The Word, a defunct book programme whose remit was absorbed within the output of The Strand, the BBC World Service's new daily arts and entertainment show. With the end of The Word and the beginning of The Strand, World Book Club became an hour-long programme broadcast on the first Saturday in the month in slots otherwise occupied by the weekly highlights compilation of The Strand. Some repeats are in an edited 30 minute version to fit The Strand's half hour slot. The first hour-long programme featured Alice Walker.

As well as 'live' radio transmissions and repeats, current programmes can be listened to online as part of the BBC's usual 'listen again' streaming. Previous programmes are archived and can also be listened to online at any time. Some recent programmes are available to download as podcasts.

The producer of the programme, Karen Holden, runs its Facebook page.

== Writers and books ==
This is a list of the writers who have taken part on World Book Club and whose programmes can be heard online (with the books that were the focus of discussion and date of first broadcast): (p = also available to download as podcast)

- Penelope Lively – Moon Tiger (3 December 2011) p
- David Grossman – To the End of the Land (5 November 2011) p
- Lionel Shriver – We Need to Talk About Kevin (1 October 2011 rpt from July 2009) p
- Hisham Matar – In the Country of Men (3 September 2011) p
- Colm Toibin – Brooklyn (6 August 2011) p
- Henning Mankell – Faceless Killers (2 July 2011) p
- Val McDermid – A Place of Execution (4 June 2011) p
- Boris Akunin – The Winter Queen (7 May 2011) p
- Jo Nesbø – The Redbreast (broadcast 2 April 2011) p
- Javier Cercas – Soldiers of Salamis (5 March 2011) p
- P.J. O'Rourke – Eat the Rich (5 February 2011) p
- Bernhard Schlink – The Reader (1 January 2011) p
- Damon Galgut – The Good Doctor (4 December 2010) p
- Kamila Shamsie – Burnt Shadows (6 November 2010) p
- Barbara Kingsolver – The Poisonwood Bible (2 October 2010) p
- Carlos Ruiz Zafon – The Shadow of the Wind (3 July 2010) p
- David Mitchell – Cloud Atlas (5 June 2010) p
- Richard Ford – The Sportswriter (1 May 2010) p
- J.M.G. Le Clézio – Désert (3 April 2010) p
- John Boyne – The Boy in the Striped Pyjamas (6 March 2010) p
- Andrea Levy – Small Island (6 February 2010) p
- Kiran Desai – The Inheritance of Loss (2 January 2010) p
- James Ellroy – American Tabloid (5 December 2009) p
- Alaa Al Aswany – The Yacoubian Building (7 November 2009) p
- Günter Grass – The Tin Drum (3 October 2009) p
- Lionel Shriver – We Need to Talk About Kevin (4 July 2009) p
- Chimamanda Ngozi Adichie – Half of a Yellow Sun (6 June 2009) p
- Nawal El Saadawi – Woman at Point Zero (2 May 2009) p
- Kate Grenville – The Secret River (4 April 2009) p
- Mohsin Hamid – The Reluctant Fundamentalist (7 March 2009) p
- David Guterson – Snow Falling on Cedars (7 February 2009) p
- Toni Morrison – Beloved (3 January 2009) p
- Derek Walcott – Omeros (6 December 2008) p
- Alice Walker – The Color Purple (1 November 2008) p
- E. Annie Proulx – The Shipping News & Brokeback Mountain (30 September 2008) p
- David Lodge – Nice Work (26 August 2008) p
- Chinua Achebe – Things Fall Apart (29 July 2008 repeat from June 2006) p
- John Irving – The World According to Garp (24 June 2008) p
- Khaled Hosseini – The Kite Runner (27 May 2008) p
- Sebastian Faulks – Birdsong (29 April 2008) p
- Jane Smiley – A Thousand Acres (25 March 2008) p
- Patricia Cornwell – Postmortem (26 February 2008) p
- Edna O'Brien – The Country Girls (29 January 2008) p
- Umberto Eco – The Name of the Rose (25 December 2007) p
- Sara Paretsky – Indemnity Only (November 2007) p
- Michael Ondaatje – The English Patient (October 2007) p
- Armistead Maupin – Tales of the City (September 2007) p
- Irvine Welsh – Trainspotting (August 2007)
- Richard Dawkins – The Selfish Gene (July 2007)
- Thomas Keneally – Schindler's Ark (June 2007)
- Wole Soyinka – Ake: The Years of Childhood (May 2007)
- Mario Vargas Llosa – Aunt Julia and the Scriptwriter (April 2007)
- Iain Banks – The Wasp Factory (March 2007)
- Rose Tremain – Restoration (February 2007)
- Yann Martel – Life of Pi (January 2007)
- John le Carré – A Perfect Spy (December 2006)
- William Boyd – Brazzaville Beach (November 2006)
- Frank McCourt – Angela's Ashes (October 2006)
- Arnold Wesker – Chicken Soup with Barley (September 2006)
- Ian Rankin – Black and Blue (August 2006)
- Joanna Trollope – The Rector's Wife (July 2006)
- Chinua Achebe – Things Fall Apart (June 2006)
- Kurt Vonnegut – Slaughterhouse-Five (May 2006)
- Orhan Pamuk – My Name is Red (April 2006)
- Alexander McCall Smith – The No. 1 Ladies' Detective Agency (March 2006)
- Scott Turow – Presumed Innocent (February 2006)
- Louis de Bernières – Captain Corelli's Mandolin (January 2006)
- Philip Pullman – Northern Lights (December 2005)
- Vikram Seth – A Suitable Boy (November 2005)
- Maya Angelou – I Know Why The Caged Bird Sings (October 2005)
- Salman Rushdie – Midnight's Children (September 2005)
- André Brink – A Dry White Season (August 2005)
- Joyce Carol Oates – Blonde (July 2005)
- Carlos Fuentes – The Death of Artemio Cruz (June 2005)
- Nick Hornby – Fever Pitch (May 2005)
- Wilbur Smith – When the Lion Feeds (April 2005)
- Ian McEwan – Atonement (March 2005)
- Zadie Smith – White Teeth (February 2005)
- P. D. James – Original Sin (January 2005)
- Paulo Coelho – The Alchemist (December 2004)
- Kazuo Ishiguro – The Remains of the Day (November 2004)
- Roddy Doyle – The Commitments (October 2004)
- Anita Desai – Fasting, Feasting (September 2004)
- Amos Oz – My Michael (August 2004)
- Gillian Slovo – Red Dust (July 2004)
- Ken Follett – Eye of the Needle (June 2004)
- Tracy Chevalier – Girl with a Pearl Earring (May 2004)
- Germaine Greer – The Female Eunuch (April 2004)
- A. S. Byatt – Possession (March 2004)
- Martin Cruz Smith – Gorky Park (February 2004)
- Amy Tan – The Joy Luck Club (January 2004)
- V. S. Naipaul – A House for Mr Biswas (December 2003)
- Isabel Allende – The House of Spirits (November 2003)
- Peter Carey – Oscar and Lucinda (September 2003)
- Frederick Forsyth – Day of the Jackal (October 2003)
- Ruth Rendell – A Judgement in Stone (August 2003)
- Julian Barnes – Flaubert's Parrot (July 2003)
- Terry Pratchett – The Colour of Magic (May 2003)
- Margaret Atwood – The Handmaid's Tale (April 2003)
- Jung Chang – Wild Swans (March 2003)
- Doris Lessing – The Grass is Singing (February 2003)
- Hanif Kureishi – The Buddha of Suburbia (January 2003)
- Ben Okri – The Famished Road (December 2002)
- Arundhati Roy – The God of Small Things (November 2002)
- Martin Amis – Money (October 2002)
- Garrison Keillor – Lake Wobegon Days (September 2002)

== Prize winners ==
Many winners of the major literary prizes have taken part in the programme, for instance:

- Nobel Prize

Ten winners of the Nobel Prize for Literature have taken part: Günter Grass (1999), Kazuo Ishiguro (2017), J.M.G. Le Clézio (2008), Doris Lessing (2007), Toni Morrison (1993), V. S. Naipaul (2001), Orhan Pamuk (2006), Wole Soyinka (1986), Mario Vargas Llosa (2010) and Derek Walcott (1992).

- Booker Prize

Seventeen winners of the Booker Prize have taken part: Margaret Atwood (2000), Julian Barnes (2011), A.S. Byatt (1990), Peter Carey (1988) & (2001), Kiran Desai (2006), Roddy Doyle (1993), Kazuo Ishiguro (1989), Howard Jacobson (2010), Thomas Keneally (1982), Penelope Lively (1987), Ian McEwan (1998), Yann Martel (2002), V. S. Naipaul (1971), Ben Okri (1991), Michael Ondaatje (1992), Arundhati Roy (1997), and Salman Rushdie (1981).

- Whitbread/Costa Book of the Year

Seven Costa (formerly called Whitbread) Book of the Year Award winners have taken part: Peter Ackroyd (1985), William Boyd (1981), Kazuo Ishiguro (1989), Andrea Levy (2004), David Lodge (1980), Philip Pullman (2006) and Colm Tóibín (2009).

- Pulitzer Prize

Five winners of the Pulitzer Prize for Fiction have taken part: Richard Ford (1996), Toni Morrison (1988), E. Annie Proulx (1994), Jane Smiley (1992), and Alice Walker (1983).

- Orange Prize

Seven winners of the Women's (formerly called Orange) Prize for Fiction have taken part: Chimamanda Ngozi Adichie (2007), Kate Grenville (2001), Barbara Kingsolver (2010), Andrea Levy (2004), Lionel Shriver (2005), Zadie Smith (2006), and Rose Tremain (2008).

== Asking questions or attending recordings ==
Apart from attending the recording in person, listeners can submit questions beforehand by email, telephone, or using the form on the World Book Club website.

Recordings usually take place in London, but sometimes in other places.

== See also ==
The Strand – the BBC World Service's former daily arts and entertainment programme
