= Wilmslow High School =

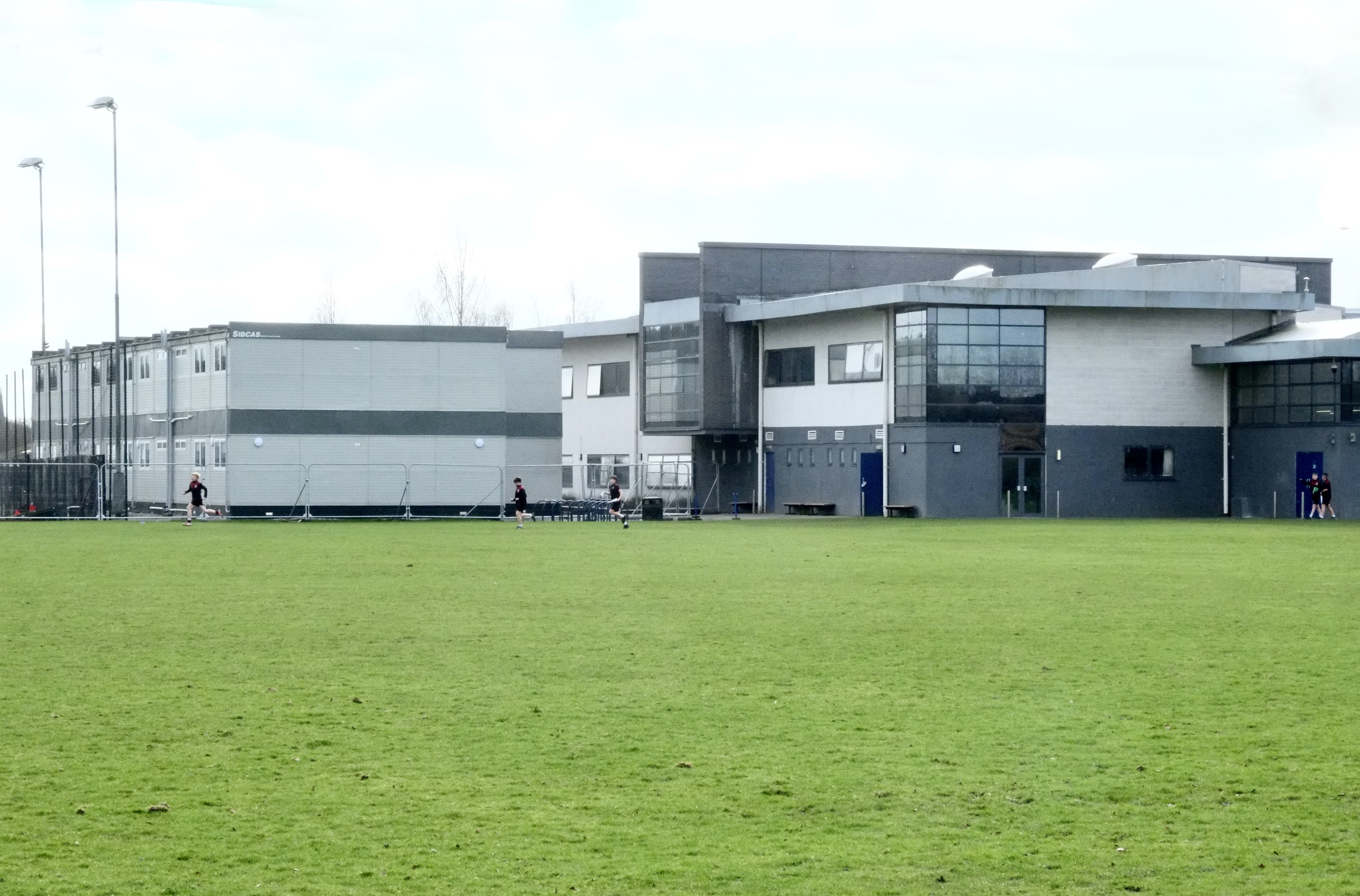
- School badge Wilmslow High School

Location
- Holly Road; Wilmslow, Cheshire, SK9 1LZ; England; 53°19′20″N 2°13′45″W

Information
- Type: Community school
- Established: 1960
- Local authority: Cheshire East
- Department for Education URN: 111443 Tables
- Ofsted: Reports
- Chair: J Caulkett
- Head teacher: Christina Kane
- Teaching staff: 130
- Gender: Boys and girls
- Age: 11 to 18
- Enrolment: 2,227 (2026/27)
- Houses: Bollin; Harefield; Norcliffe; Thorngrove
- Colour
- Former name: Wilmslow County Grammar School
- Website: www.wilmslowhigh.com

Wilmslow High School is a mixed-sex 11–18 comprehensive secondary school in Wilmslow, Cheshire, England. The school began in 1960 as a grammar school and gradually became a comprehensive school, becoming Wilmslow High School in 1991. As of June 2025, the school has a pupil intake of 2,227 pupils, despite only having a school capacity of 1,977 pupils.

== History ==
Wilmslow High School was originally established as the co-educational Wilmslow County Grammar School in September 1960 with 900 pupils. The new county grammar school was opened by Sir James Mountford, the Vice-Chancellor of the University of Liverpool, on 24 March 1961. A girls' grammar school was built on 14 acres (57,000 m^{2}) of the former Colshaw Hall Farm, and situated on Dean Row Road. It opened in 1964 and housed 750 girls. The school on Holly Road became an all-boys' school.

Wilmslow Boys' Grammar School (Holly Road) became Harefield County High School when it became a sixth form-entry comprehensive in 1978, gradually becoming more comprehensive. Wilmslow Girls' Grammar School (Dean Row Road) became Dean Row County High School. In the mid-1980s it became Wilmslow County High School, then Wilmslow High School in 1991. The school was designated a Specialist Sports College in September 2003 and subsequently re-designated in 2008 before the specialist schools programme ended in 2010. Officially, the school is no longer a Specialist Sports College, despite still being advertised as such.

Other former schools in Wilmslow included Wilmslow County Secondary School for Girls on Wycliffe Avenue. When the Wycliffe Avenue Secondary Modern School closed, the girls moved to Thorngrove County High School, formally Hough Secondary Modern School for Boys. This school was originally opened in 1965 on Thorngrove Road – the land now occupied by the A34 bypass. Later, all schools closed, leaving Wilmslow with one high school on the site of the original boys' grammar school.

== Overview ==
=== Extracurricular activities ===
The school operates the Duke of Edinburgh's Award Scheme, and a bi-annual "World Challenge" expedition is available to older students, which for the last three years has been run through Camps International. Competitive sport is a feature of the school's extracurricular programme "Sports Xtra". In 2016, School Sport Magazine ranked the school 6th best sporting state school in the country.

=== Academic performance ===
The school is currently designated "good" by Ofsted, who reviewed the school in 2013; this is a drop from their previous position of "outstanding" in 2011. As of 2016, 75% of students achieve a C or better in both English and maths (compared to a national average of 59.3%), and the average A level grade attained by students is a C (equal to the national average). Although the school is below national average according to the government's "Progress 8" metric, they have an "Attainment 8" score above national average.

=== Houses ===
The school is split into two halves and four houses. Bollin and Harefield form half of the school while the Norcliffe and Thorngrove make up the other half, consequently students of the two halves are scheduled within classes together. Students wear ties according to their house colours.

- Bollin was formed in 1992 and is named after the River Bollin, which is a major tributary of the River Mersey in the north-west of England.
- Harefield is named after the former Harefield County High School, which was then renamed as Wilmslow County High School in 1984 and subsequently Wilmslow High School.
- Norcliffe is named after Norcliffe Hall, a large house near the village of Styal, Cheshire.
- Thorngrove is named after the former Thorngrove County High School, which was originally the Hough Secondary Modern School for Boys which opened in 1965 on Thorngrove Road – on land now occupied by the A34 bypass.

== Notable former pupils ==
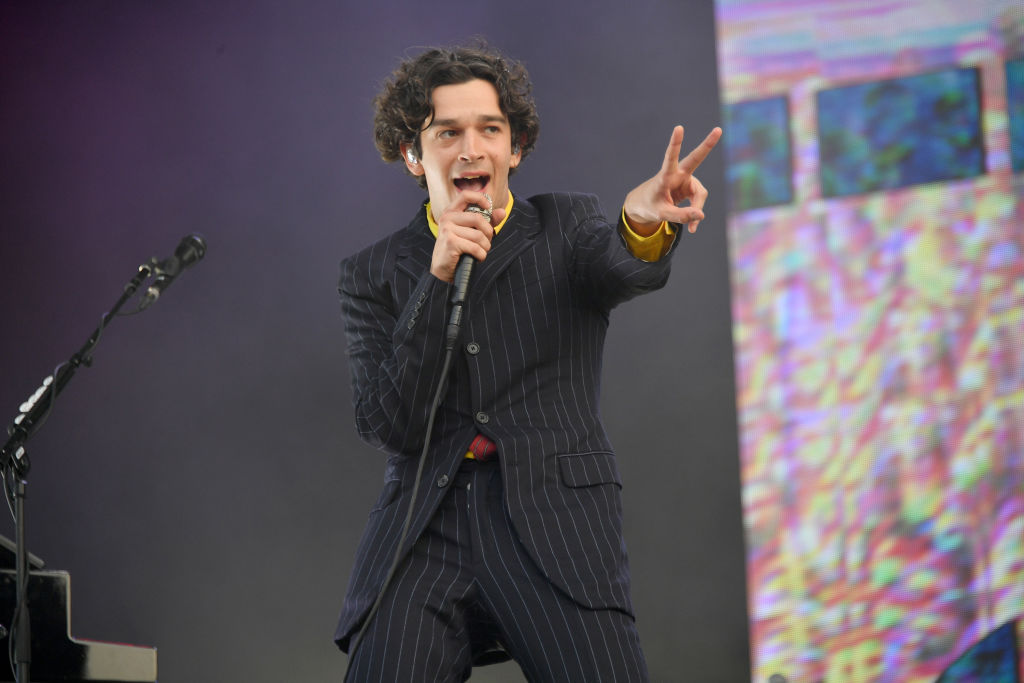
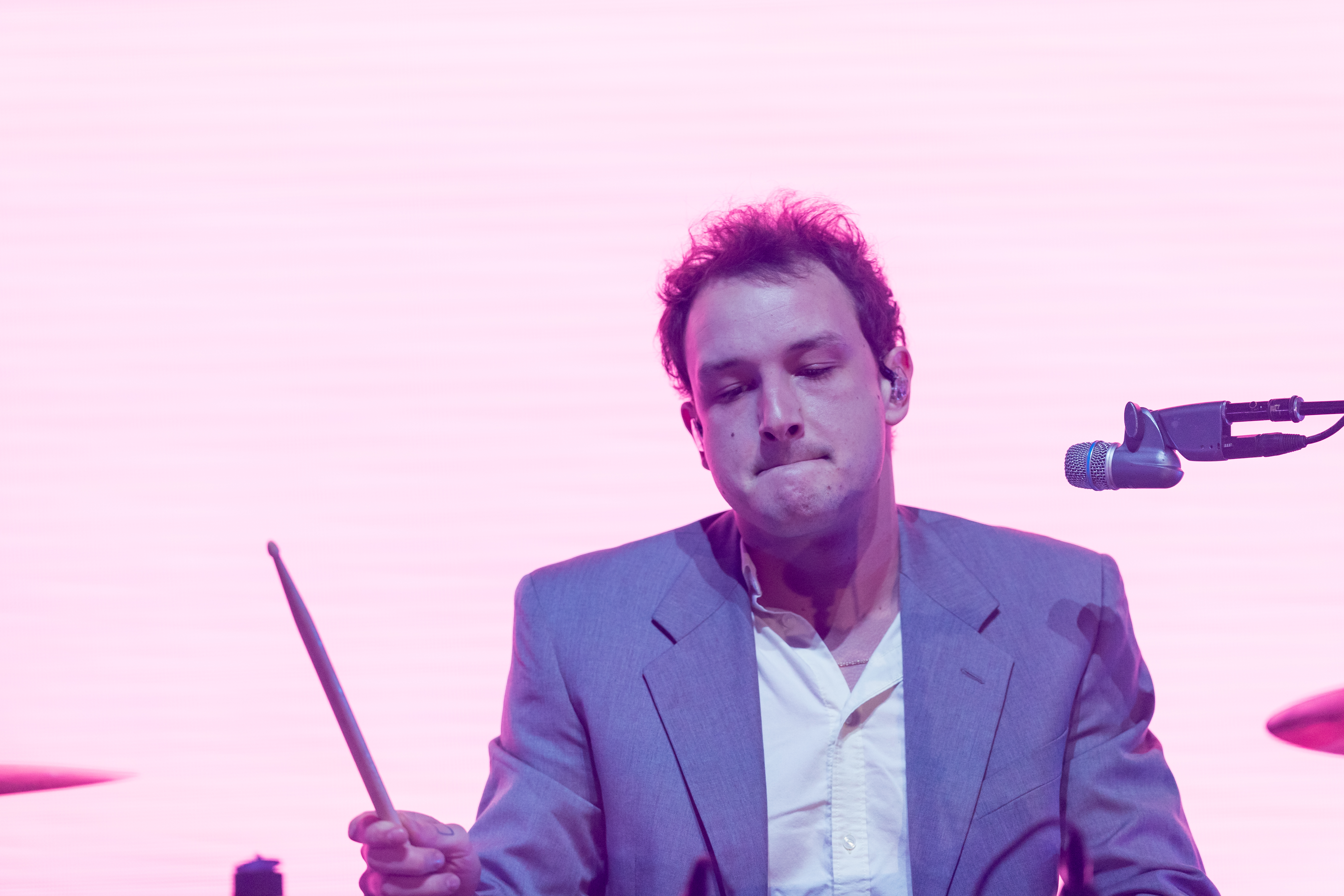
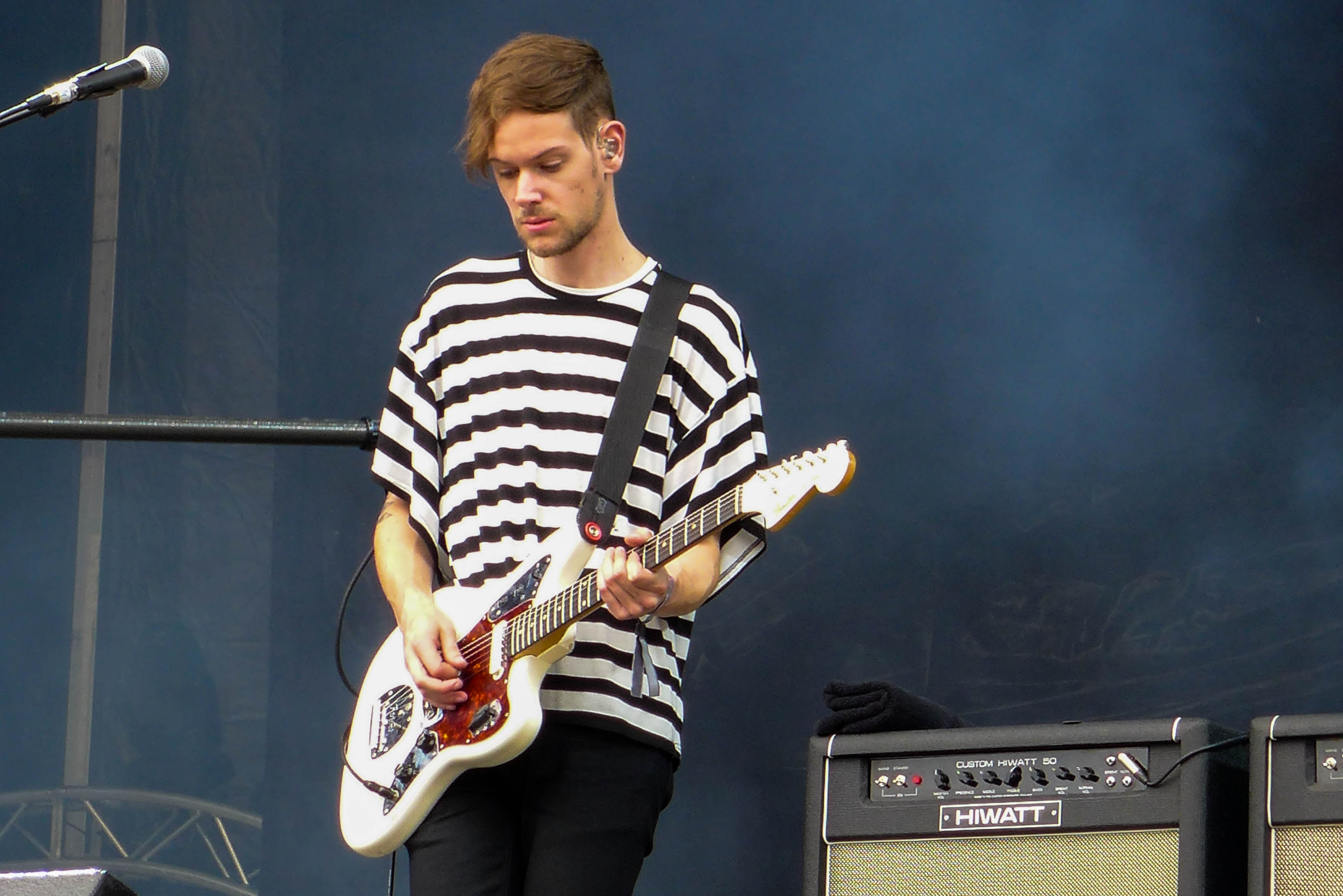
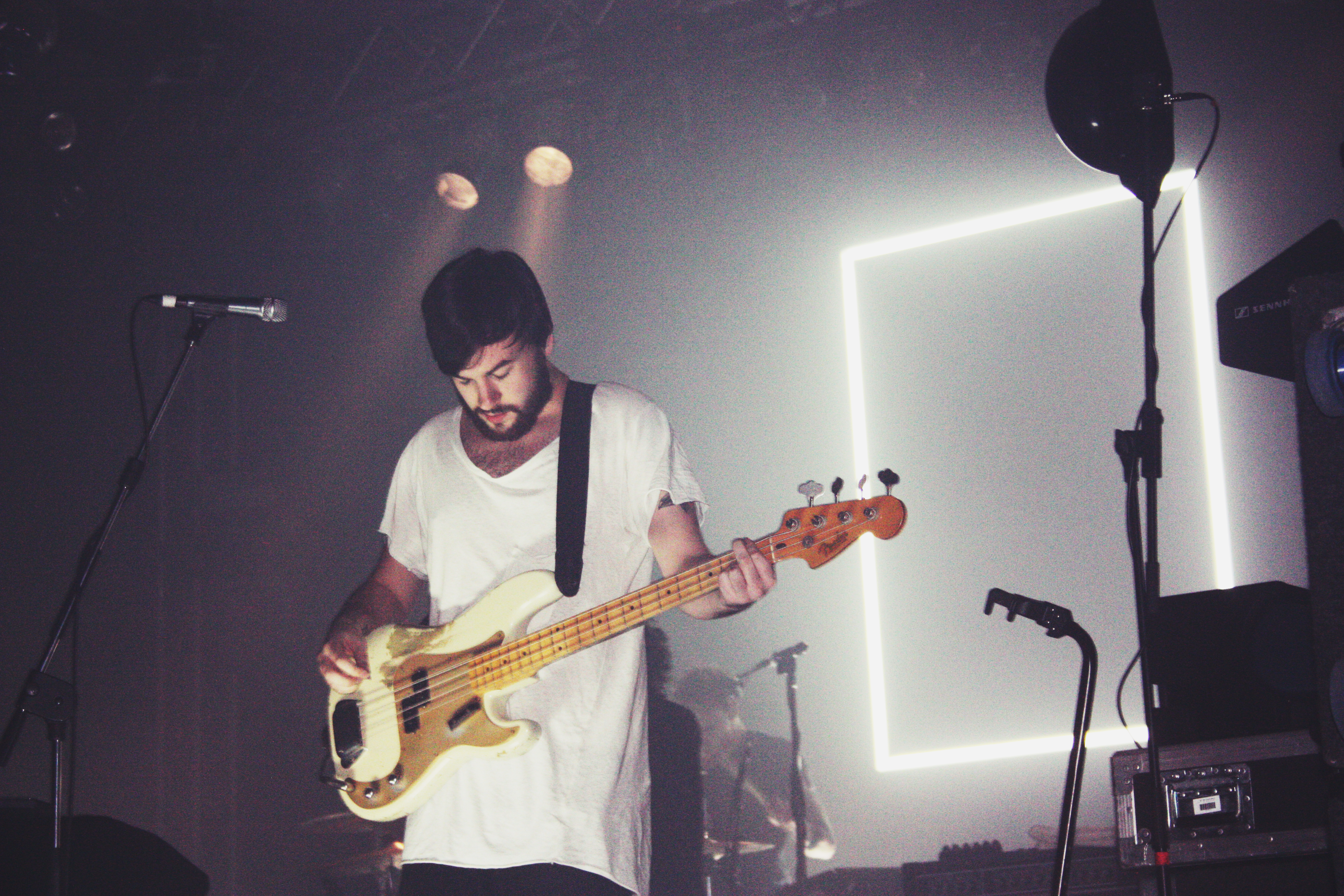
Matty Healy, George Daniel, Adam Hann and Ross MacDonald formed the band that would become the 1975 while students at Wilmslow High School in 2002, and started professionally releasing music in 2012
- The 1975 – members of the indie art pop band – Matty Healy, George Daniel, Adam Hann, Ross MacDonald – formed the band in 2002 while attending the school.
- Seren Bundy-Davies - Manchester-born Welsh/UK 400m runner
- Lee Dixon – former professional footballer.
- Daniel Gordon- BAFTA winning director
- Doves – English Indie Rock Band, formed within Wilmslow High School. Their most popular song "Black and White Town" is a song referenced to that of Wilmslow town.
- Richard Fleeshman – Coronation Street actor and singer-songwriter.
- Johnny Gorman – Northern Ireland international footballer.
- Sarah Hadland – actress.
- John Harris – Guardian columnist.
- Sam James - Sale Sharks and England Saxons rugby player

=== Wilmslow County Grammar School for Boys ===
- Andy Fanshawe, mountaineer
- Jem Finer, musician, and founding member of The Pogues who co-wrote Fairytale of New York, and son of Prof Samuel Finer (at Keele University and the University of Manchester)
- Michael Hill, Bishop of Bristol from 2003–17
- Roger Matthews, Professor of Near Eastern Archaeology since 2011 at the University of Reading
- David Michaels, actor
- Neil Roberts, actor
- Chris Nicholl, footballer
- John Waite, Radio 4 investigative broadcaster, notably for Face the Facts

=== Wilmslow County Grammar School for Girls ===
- Fionnuala Ellwood, TV actress who played Lynn Whiteley in Emmerdale
- Jo Wheeler (not the sixth form), Sky News weather forecaster
- Barbara Wilshere, actress

=== Wycliffe Avenue School ===
- Terry Waite (for two years)
