= Carlos Ruiz Zafón =

Spanish novelist (1964–2020)

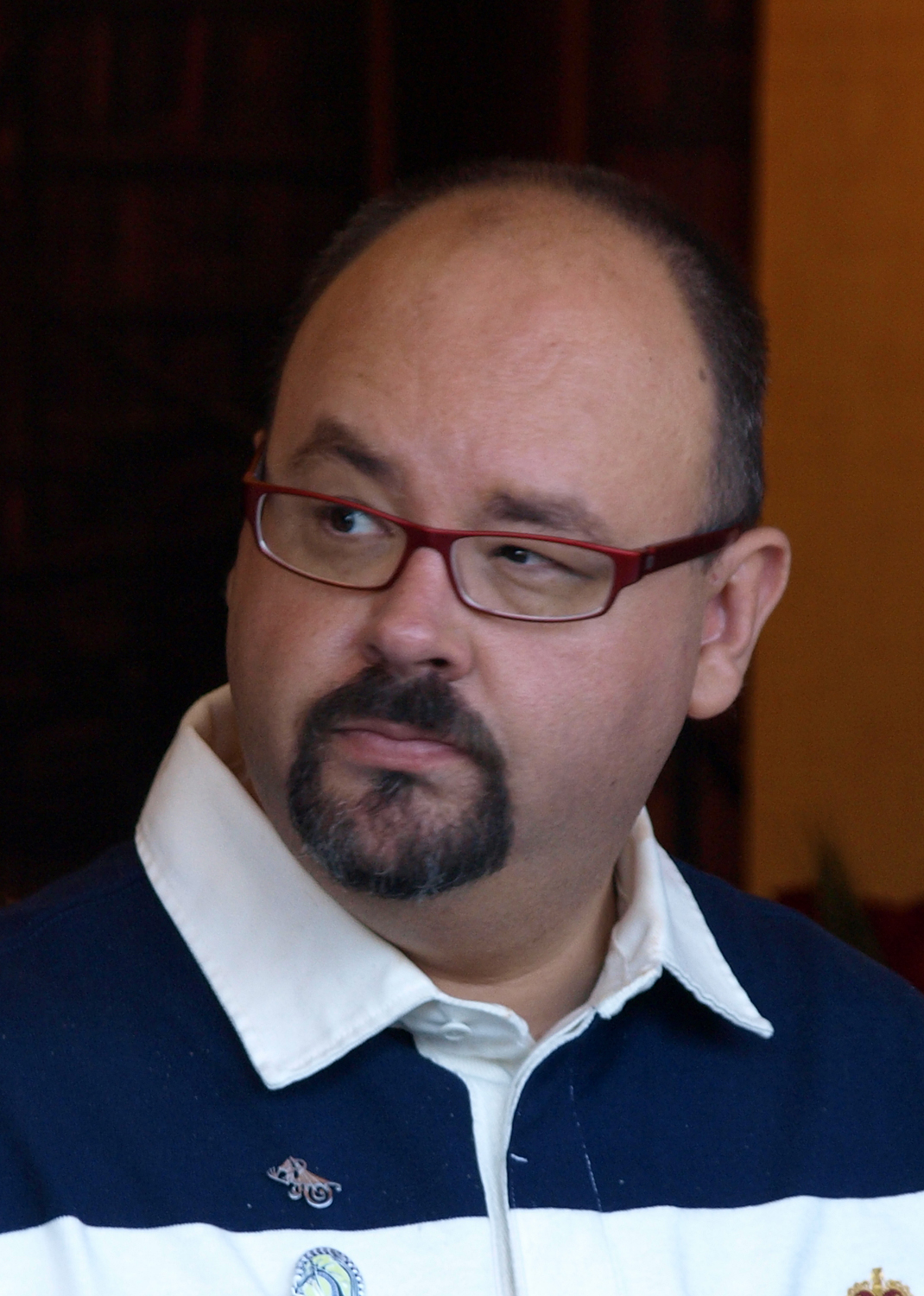
- Carlos Ruiz Zafón in 2008
- Born: 25 September 1964; Barcelona, Spain
- Died: 19 June 2020 (aged 55); Los Angeles, California, United States
- Occupation: Writer
- Writing career
- Language: Spanish & English
- Period: 1994–2020

Carlos Ruiz Zafón (Spanish pronunciation: [ˈkaɾlos rwiθ θaˈfon]; 25 September 1964 – 19 June 2020) was a Spanish novelist known for his 2001 novel La sombra del viento (The Shadow of the Wind). The novel sold 15 million copies and was winner of numerous awards; it was included in a list of the 100 best books in Spanish of the last 25 years, made in 2007 by 81 Spanish and Hispanic American writers and critics.

== Biography ==
Ruiz Zafón was born in Barcelona. His grandparents had worked in a factory and his father sold insurance. Ruiz Zafón began his working life in advertising. In the 1990s he moved to Los Angeles where he worked briefly in screen writing. He was fluent in English.

Ruiz Zafón died of colorectal cancer in Los Angeles on 19 June 2020.

== Literary career ==
Ruiz Zafón's first novel, El príncipe de la niebla 1993 (The Prince of Mist, published in English in 2010), earned the Edebé literary prize for young adult fiction. He was also the author of three additional young adult novels, El palacio de la medianoche (1994), Las luces de septiembre (1995) and Marina (1999).

In 2001 he published his first adult novel La sombra del viento (The Shadow of the Wind, Lucia Graves's English translation published in 2004), a Gothic mystery that involves Daniel Sempere's quest to track down the man responsible for destroying every book written by author Julian Carax. The novel has sold millions of copies worldwide, with more than a million copies sold in the UK. La sombra del viento garnered critical acclaim around the world.

Ruiz Zafón's next novel, El juego del ángel, was published in April 2008. The English edition, The Angel's Game, was also translated by Lucia Graves. It is a prequel to The Shadow of the Wind, also set in Barcelona, but during the 1920s and 1930s. It follows (and is narrated by) David Martín, a young writer who is approached by a mysterious figure to write a book. Ruiz Zafón intended it to be included in a four-book series along with The Shadow of the Wind.

The next book in the cycle, El prisionero del cielo, appeared in 2011. It returns to The Shadow of the Wind's Daniel Sempere and his travel back to the 1940s to resolve a buried secret. The novel was published in English in July 2012 as The Prisoner of Heaven.

The Labyrinth of Spirits (original title: El laberinto de los espíritus) is the fourth and final book in the Cemetery of Forgotten Books series. The novel was released on 17 November 2016 in Spain and Latin America by Spanish publisher Planeta. HarperCollins published the English translation by Lucia Graves, which was released on 18 September 2018.

Ruiz Zafón's works have been published in more than 45 countries and have been translated into more than 50 languages.

== Influences ==
Influences on Ruiz Zafón's work have included 19th century classics, crime fiction, noir authors, and contemporary writers.

Apart from books, another large influence came in the form of films and screenwriting. He said in interviews that he found it easier to visualize scenes in his books in a cinematic way, which lends itself to the lush worlds and curious characters he created.

== Works ==
=== Young adult ===
- El príncipe de la niebla (1993), translated as The Prince of Mist (2010)
- El palacio de la medianoche (1994), translated as The Midnight Palace (2011)
- Las luces de septiembre (1995), translated as The Watcher in the Shadows (2013)
- Marina (1999), translated as Marina (2013)

=== Novels ===
El cementerio de los libros olvidados series (The Cemetery of Forgotten Books)

Carlos Ruiz Zafón talks about The Angel's Game on Bookbits radio.

- La sombra del viento, 2001 (The Shadow of the Wind)
- El juego del ángel, 2008 (The Angel's Game)
- El prisionero del cielo, 2011 (The Prisoner of Heaven)
- El laberinto de los espíritus, 2016 (The Labyrinth of Spirits)
- La ciudad de vapor, 2021 (The City of Mist; stories, some connected to the novels)

=== Short stories ===
- "Rosa de fuego", 2012 ("The Rose of Fire")
- "Gaudí in Manhattan" (also known as La Mujer de Vapor), 2015
- "Two-Minute Apocalypse", (2015)

== Awards and honors ==
- Edebé Award for Young Adult and Children's Literature 1993 for El príncipe de la niebla
- Finalist for the Fernando Lara Novel Award 2000, for The Shadow of the Wind
- Finalist for British Book Awards for author of the year, 2006
- Best Foreign Book Prize, France 2004
- Prix de Associations des Libraires du Québec
- Casino da Póvoa Literary Prize, (Póvoa de Varzim), Portugal
- Bjornson Order of Literary Merit, Norway
- Barry Award for best novel, United States
- Original Voices Award, United States
- Selected as "a book to remember" by the New York Public Library, 2004
- José Manuel Lara Hernández Foundation Award, 2004 for the best selling book
- Booksense Prize, 2005, United States
- Euskadi de Plata 2008 for El juego del ángel
- Nielsen Award, United Kingdom
- Finalist for the Llibreter Award
- Ottakar's Award, United Kingdom
- José Manuel Lara Foundation Award for the best selling book
- Readers' Prize from La Vanguardia
- Protagonistas Award, Spain
