= The Angel's Game =

2008 novel by Carlos Ruiz Zafón

The Angel's Game El Juego del Ángel
- Book cover
- Author: Carlos Ruiz Zafón
- Original title: El juego del ángel
- Language: Spanish
- Series: Cemetery of Forgotten Books
- Genre: Mystery
- Publisher: Planeta (Spain); Weidenfeld & Nicolson (UK)
- Publication date: April 17, 2008
- Publication place: Spain
- Media type: Print (hardcover and paperback)
- Pages: 672
- ISBN: 978-84-08-08118-0
- Preceded by: The Shadow of the Wind
- Followed by: The Prisoner of Heaven

Carlos Ruiz Zafón talks about The Angel's Game on Bookbits radio.

The Angel's Game (El juego del ángel, 2008) is a prequel to 2001's The Shadow of the Wind, by Spanish author Carlos Ruiz Zafón. The novel marks a return to The Cemetery of Forgotten Books in Barcelona's Raval district, and the Sempere & Sons bookshop. Like The Shadow of the Wind, it was translated into English by Lucia Graves and published in 2009. In Spain it was published in 2008. The planned initial print run broke all publishing records in the country, with one million copies.

== Plot ==
The Angel's Game is set in Barcelona in the 1920s and 1930s and follows a young writer, David Martin.

In a once-abandoned mansion at the heart of Barcelona, Martín makes his living by writing sensationalist crime stories under a pseudonym. The survivor of a troubled childhood, he has taken refuge in the world of books and spends his nights spinning baroque, "grand guignol" tales about the city's underworld.

His own life begins to take on a dramatic bent, in the form of a number of complex relationships: with Pedro Vidal, his patron, with Cristina, the daughter of Vidal's chauffeur, and with Isabella, a young admirer of David and his work.

Furthermore, the history of the house he lives in begins to seep into his life - in a locked room within the house lie photographs and letters hinting at the mysterious death of the previous owner. At the same time, he receives a letter from a reclusive but wealthy French editor, Andreas Corelli, who makes him an irresistible offer. He is to write a book unlike anything that has ever existed—an attempt at a new religious work with the power to change hearts and minds. Yet as David begins the work, he realizes that there is a connection between his haunting book and the shadows that surround his home.

== Reception ==
The Canadian Press's Maclean's Magazine placed The Angel's Game as number one for their top ten hardcover fiction books for the week ending July 7, 2009. Marley Walker called it "Zafon's ambitious new historic melodrama." USA Today praised The Angel's Game as "a multi-layered confection that combines undying love, magical realism, meditations on religion, the importance of books, and a love affair with the vibrant city of Barcelona."

Andrew Reimer said, "Here is more of the same from the author of The Shadow of the Wind " which "is bound to make his fans whoop with joy." However, he also added, "The climax of this new tale is a bit of a mess, with too many twists and turns and perhaps a few too many corpses." Terrence Rafferty wrote that "Ruiz Zafón’s flamboyant pulp epic is something altogether sillier, a pact-with-the-devil tale whose only purpose is to give its readers some small intimation of the darker pleasures of the literary arts, the weird thrill of storytelling without conscience."

Aravind Adiga of The Age complained that there was "plenty that is ludicrous, clichéd and schematic," but explained that "[l]overs of Barcelona will enjoy Ruiz Zafón's skillful use of that city's architecture--Gothic and Modern."
