= The Labyrinth of Spirits =

Novel by Carlos Ruiz Zafón

The Labyrinth of the Spirits
- First edition (Spanish)
- Author: Carlos Ruiz Zafón
- Original title: El laberinto de los espíritus
- Translator: Lucia Graves
- Language: Spanish
- Series: Cemetery of Forgotten Books
- Genre: Mystery
- Publisher: Planeta Group (Spain); Weidenfeld & Nicolson (UK)
- Publication date: November 17, 2016
- Publication place: Spain
- Media type: Print
- Pages: 805 pp (Hardcover)
- ISBN: 9780062668691 Hardcover
- Dewey Decimal: 863/.64 23
- LC Class: PQ6668.U49 L3313 2017
- Preceded by: The Prisoner of Heaven

The Labyrinth of the Spirits (original title: El laberinto de los espíritus) is a fiction novel by Spanish author Carlos Ruiz Zafón. This is the fourth and final book in the Cemetery of Forgotten Books series. The novel was initially released on 17 November 2016 in Spain and Latin America by Planeta Group. HarperCollins published the English translation by Lucia Graves on September 18, 2018. The book was translated into more than 36 languages.

== Plot ==
Daniel Sempere and Fermín Romero de Torres again appear in the novel set in the Barcelona of the late 1950s and early 1960s. Daniel, overwhelmed by rage and need to avenge the death of his mother, Isabella, will discover a network of crimes and violations of Francoist Spain, and a new protagonist, Alicia Gris, will help him solve the mysteries. The main plot centers on the mysterious disappearance of the minister of culture, Mauricio Valls (introduced in the previous novel, The Prisoner of Heaven), in November 1959. Alicia, a detective for the Spanish secret police, investigates this case together with her partner Juan Manuel Vargas. Their detective work leads them from Madrid to Barcelona, where they discover long-forgotten secrets with the help of the Semperes and Fermin. The novel is arranged into alternate chronologies labeled after liturgical prayers and the Catholic requiem mass: Dies Irae, Kyrie, Agnus Dei, Libera Me, and In Paradisum.

== Reception ==
The Labyrinth of Spirits received positive reviews from critics, with many calling it a satisfying conclusion to the Cemetery of Forgotten Books series.

The Guardian 's reviewer wrote that "the final part of Zafón’s historical Spanish quartet The Cemetery of Forgotten Books is a giant, genre-crossing delight." Publishers Weekly called it a" gripping and moving thriller," adding that "fans of complex and literate mysteries featuring detectives with integrity working under oppressive and corrupt regimes will be well satisfied." The Irish Times opined that "this is a novel to lose oneself in, and it promotes the sort of reading experience we remember from childhood – of complete absorption into a fantasy world – but rarely attain in later life."
