= Britain's Finest =

Television documentary series

Britain's Finest is a TV documentary series made by independent production company Lion Television, now part of All3Media for Channel 5 in the UK.

The eight 90-minute series, split into two separate series of four episodes, the first in 2003 and the second in 2005, focuses on a wide range of Britain's finest things, from buildings to gardens, actors to natural wonders, as voted for by Channel 5 viewers and Radio Times readers. Each episode has a lead presenter and includes a variety of additional specialists.

The publicity generated for some of the visitor attractions featured, such as stately homes, led to an increase in visitor numbers.

== Episodes ==
Series 1

1. "Stately Homes". Presenter Hugh Scully
2. "Gardens". Presenter Jenny Agutter
3. "Ancient Monuments". Presenter Tim Marlow
4. "Castles". Presenter Richard Holmes

Series 2

1. "Actors". Presenter Fay Ripley
2. "Actresses". Presenter Simon Callow
3. "Treasures". Presenter Tim Marlow
4. "Natural Wonders". Presenter Nigel Marven
