= Marina (novel) =

1999 novel by Carlos Ruiz Zafón

- Author: Carlos Ruiz Zafón
- Language: Spanish
- Genre: Thriller; Romance novel
- Published: Edebé
- Publication date: 1999
- Publication place: Spain
- ISBN: 9788408084266

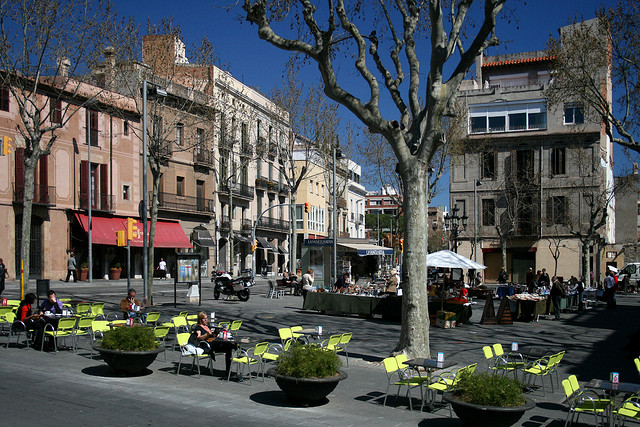
Plaza Sarriá, the square of the district Sarriá where Oscar and Marina were often staying.

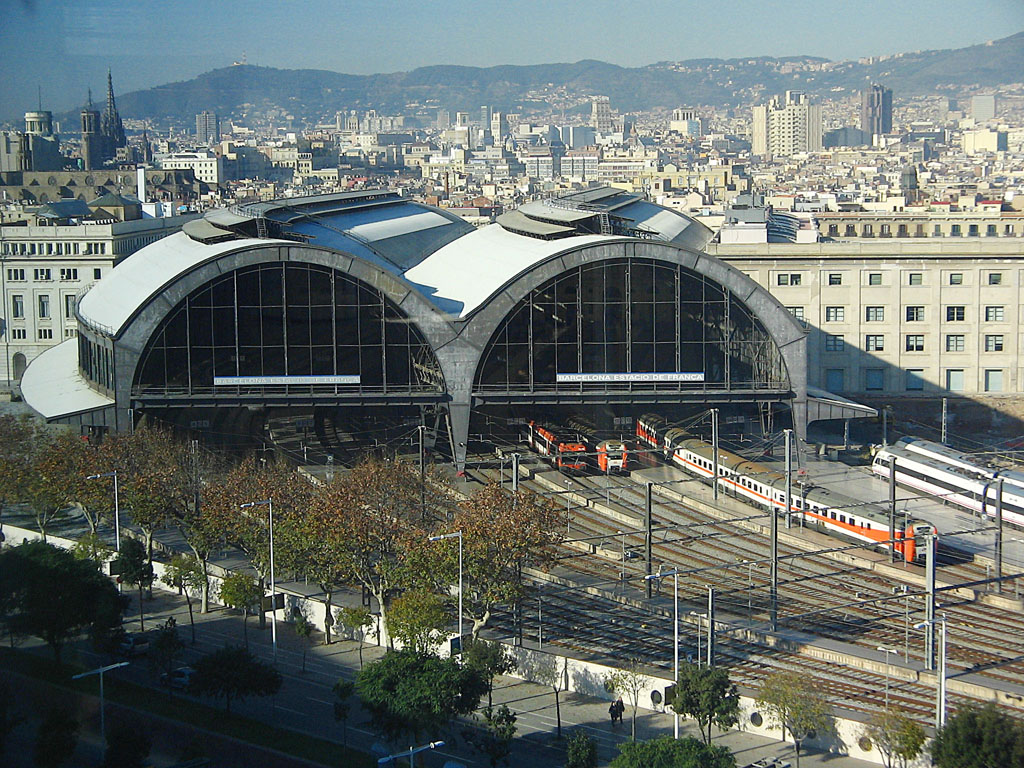
Estación de Francia, the station where Oscar was found by a policeman.

Marina is a 1999 young adult fiction novel by Spanish author Carlos Ruiz Zafón. The novel was described as a historical supernatural mystery set in Barcelona.

Zafón described it as "the most personal" of his works. The novel looks into self-investigation, just Bildungsroman, in the bloom of love and its difficult managing, and to melancholy caused by faithfulness. The Guardian called Zafón's narrative style "simply beautiful".

== Plot summary ==
The main events start at the end of September 1979 in Barcelona, following two parallel stories.

The principal one is the history of Marina and Oscar. The meeting of a mysterious girl called Marina completely changes the sentimental part of Oscar's life. One day she takes him to the cemetery of Sarriá where she tells him about the peculiar "lady in black", who visits on the last Sunday of every month at ten o’clock in the morning. Eventually, they decide to follow the woman and find out more about her. This shadowing involves them into an entangled and dangerous adventure.

Then, the novel focuses on an enigmatic Mijail Kolvenik's life and his company. Mijail is a genius in creating of orthopaedic articles and medical prosthesis. He is motivated by an obsession to overcome the death and errors of human deformations. Tired of genetic degeneration that deforms and atrophies him, Kolvenik reconstructs his body before the illness entirely consumes him. "He’d turned into a hellish creature, stinking of the rotten flesh with which he had rebuilt himself..." Using the essence of Teufel, –the black butterfly that habits the sewage system –he develops a serum that sustains his life. After 30 years of his official death, Mijail Kolvenik comes back looking for the essence that maintains him alive. He has resurrected like the black butterfly from the sewages that "feeds on its young, and when it buries itself to die, it takes with it one of its larvae, which it devours when it comes back to life".

Marina Blau and Oscar Drai explore the historical setting of Barcelona, including the old orthopaedic prothesis plant of Velo-Granell.

Another outstanding mystery to be revealed to Oscar is Marina's secret. A secret of the girl whose life impacts her behaviour and changes Oscar's life forever.

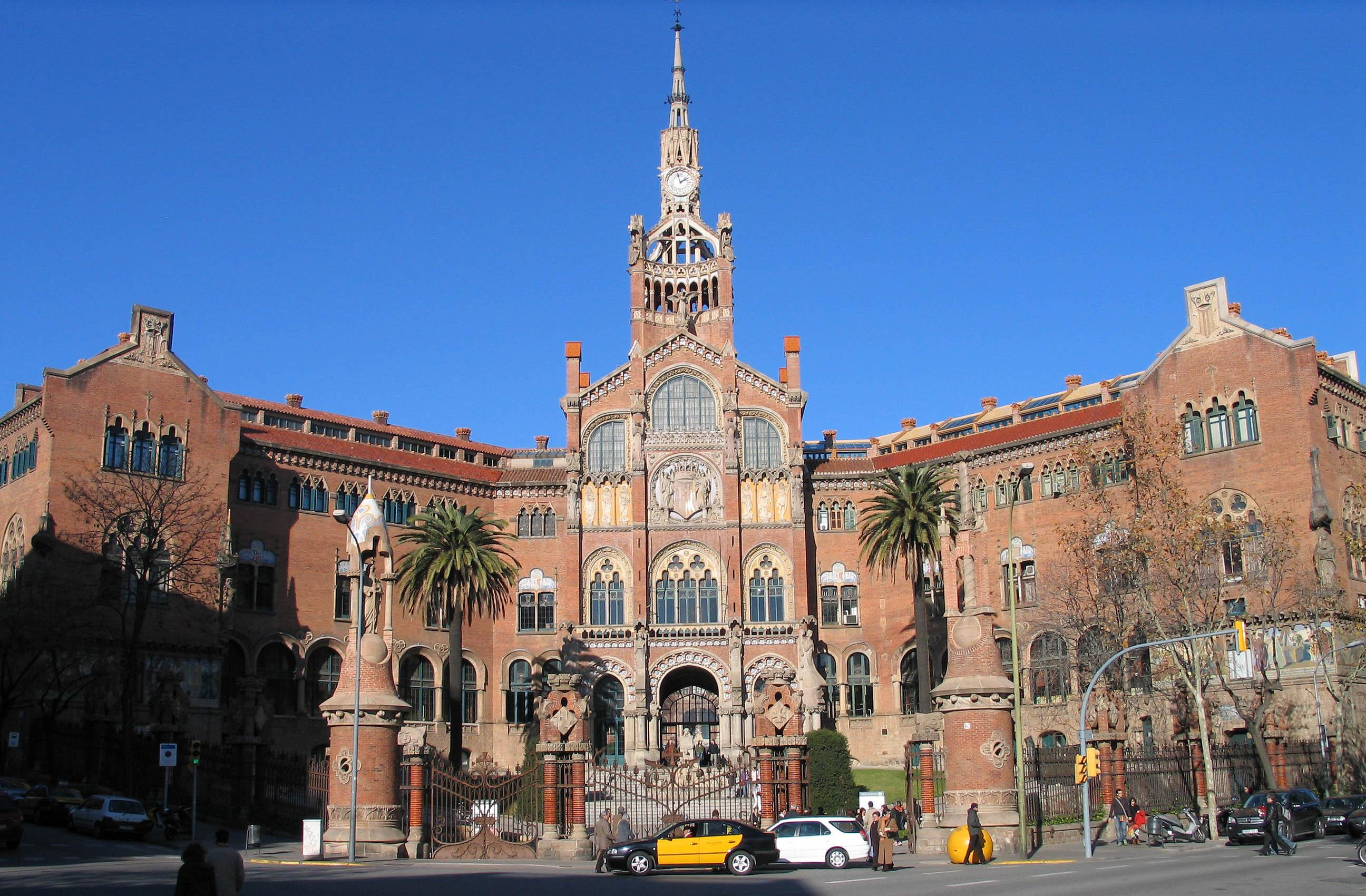
Sant Pau Hospital, the hospital where Marina was staying.

== Characters ==
=== Protagonists ===
- Oscar Drai: A 15 years old teenager who lives and studies in the boarding school in Barcelona. His life changes entirely after meeting with Marina. They become friends, and love sentiments start to develop between them from the first meeting. The guys experience a true and sincere love while having the adventure of penetrating a horrible mystery of Mijail Kolvenik and Velo-Granell.
- Marina Blau: Like Oscar, she is the main character of the story. She is a 15-year-old girl, daughter of Kristen Auermann and Germán Blau. Marina is captivating and perspicacious. She has the beauty of her mother: her hair is hay blond, and the eyes are ash grey. She lives with her father and a cat Kafka in a decaying house in Sarriá. The girl shares the venture of Mijail Kolvenik and Velo-Granell with Oscar.
- Mijail Kolvenik: An expert in creating orthopaedic articles and medical prosthesis. He is a sinister character in the story. One day he has managed to overcome death by investigating the life of a black butterfly and turning into a monster.
- Eva Irinova: A Russian woman. When Eva was a child, she was adopted by comedians Sergei and Tatiana. In the past, she was a fabulous singer. And she met Kolvenik in one of her performances.

=== Minor characters ===
- Germán Blau: Marina's father. His hair is white and long, his hands are long and have fine, interminable fingers. He is an exceptional artist and painter. When he was young, he used to be a trainee of Quim Salvat. And now he has only one reason to live: for his daughter Marina.
- Joan Shelley: Is an old man. Many years ago, he was the doctor of Kolvenik.
- Víctor Florián: Was a police inspector and tried to investigate the case of Kolvenik and Velo-Granell.
- Luís Claret: A man with bright and deep eyes, with wrinkles in his face. He was the driver of Eva Irinova's carriage.He are the best friend of kolvenik he always showed her respect
- Benjamín Sentís: An eager and envious man.
- Sergei Glazunow: Eva Irinova's guardian.
- Tatiana Glazunow: Sergei Glazunow's twin-sister. With her brother she adopted Eva.
- María Shelley: Has a fragile constitution and smelled of rose water. She was about in her early thirties, but looked younger.
- JF: Is Oscar's hypochondriac friend in the boarding school where they study together. He has deep eyes, nervous temperament, and a weak constitution.
- Quim Salvat: According to gossips, he was a lover of Germán Blau's mother. Later Germán became apprenticed to him.

== Critical reception ==
The Guardian: 'Marina is one of those books that are meant to be devoured in one sitting; feasted upon quickly, as it will truly curb any hunger you might have had for a good read. It is a story, and an excellent one at that.'.

Publishers Weekly: 'Starred Review. Zafón is a master of both the subtle simile and the outrageous image... Unlikely discoveries in mysterious, half-ruined mansions alternate with spine-tingling action sequences to create a grotesquerie that will delight horror fans. Ages 12 and up.'
