= Cemetery of Forgotten Books =

Book series by Carlos Ruiz Zafón

The Cemetery of Forgotten Books is a book series by the Spanish author Carlos Ruiz Zafón. It is a four-part literary series set primarily in Barcelona from the 1930s to the 1960s, during and after the Spanish Civil War under the Francoist regime. The series combines Gothic fiction with historical intrigue, and psychological drama, all centered around a mysterious, secret library that preserves books forgotten by time.

== Overview ==
The series begins with The Shadow of the Wind, where a young boy named Daniel is introduced to the Cemetery of Forgotten Books and selects a novel that leads him into a complex investigation involving lost authors, political repression, and personal tragedy. Subsequent volumes—The Angel’s Game, The Prisoner of Heaven, and The Labyrinth of the Spirits—expand the scope of the story across generations, revealing hidden connections between characters, the consequences of literary obsession, and the lasting impact of memory and storytelling.

The plots of the four novels are complex and densely interrelated. Zafon's writing has been compared to Umberto Eco, William Hjortsberg, and Gaston Leroux. He has also been described as a modern successor to "the narratively propulsive but socially reflective fiction" of nineteenth-century writers like Leo Tolstoy, Wilkie Collins, and Charles Dickens.

== Books in the series ==
- The Shadow of the Wind (2001)
- The Angel's Game (2008)
- The Prisoner of Heaven (2011)
- The Labyrinth of Spirits (2016)
