= War Walks =

- Genre: Documentary
- Presented by: Professor Richard Holmes
- Country of origin: United Kingdom
- Original language: English
- No. of series: 2
- No. of episodes: 12

Production
- Producers: Grant Mansfield; Mark Fielder
- Running time: 30 minutes

Original release
- Network: BBC Two
- Release: 26 July 1996 – 19 December 1997

War Walks is a BBC television documentary series presented by the historian Richard Holmes, then Professor of Military and Security Studies at Cranfield University. The series is about battlefields which are visited by Holmes, and is also about the corresponding battles. The series covers twelve battles. Both the first and the second series are about battles fought by British or English forces (sometimes with foreign allies). Nine of these were fought against German, French or Norman forces. The other three are from British or English civil wars.

The first series is about six battles fought in the region sometimes called the fatal avenue in the north of France and the south of Belgium. The second series is about six battles fought in the British Isles, and, in the case of Dunkirk, in the English Channel.

The series included descriptions of the battles, the events leading up to them and the events resulting from them, and the battlefields.

== Episodes ==
=== Series One (1996) ===
This series is by BBC Bristol.

1. Agincourt (1415) (26 July 1996)
2. Waterloo (1815) (2 August 1996)
3. Mons and Le Cateau (1914) (9 August 1996)
4. The Somme (1916) (16 August 1996)
5. Arras (1940) (23 August 1996)
6. Operation Goodwood (1944) (30 August 1996)

=== Series Two (1997) ===
1. Hastings (1066) (14 November 1997)
2. Bosworth Field (1485) (21 November 1997)
3. Naseby (1645) (28 November 1997)
4. The Boyne (1690) (5 December 1997)
5. Dunkirk (1940) (12 December 1997)
6. The Blitz (1940–41) (19 December 1997)

== Books ==
BBC Books published a book, written by Holmes, to accompany each series:

- War Walks: From Agincourt to Normandy, published in 1996, accompanies the first series. By 28 September 1996, this book had spent nine weeks in the "Hardbacks" section of "The Times Bestseller List". It was ranked sixth in the list of hardback bestsellers published in The Times on 31 August 1996. It was included, in particular, in the top twenty hardback bestsellers in the lists published in The Times on 31 August and 7, 14, 21 and 28 September 1996, with sales of a total of 2,168 copies reported in the lists during those five weeks. This book has been called "excellent".
- War Walks 2: From the Battle of Hastings to the Blitz, published in 1997, accompanies the second series.

The two books were published in a single volume under the title Complete War Walks: British Battles from Hastings to Normandy by BBC World Wide Ltd in 2003.
