= The Prisoner of Heaven =

Novel by Carlos Ruiz Zafón

- First edition (Spanish)
- Author: Carlos Ruiz Zafón
- Original title: El prisionero del cielo
- Translator: Lucia Graves
- Cover artist: Fondo F. Catala-Roca
- Language: Spanish
- Series: Cemetery of Forgotten Books
- Genre: Mystery
- Publisher: HarperCollins / Weidenfeld & Nicolson
- Publication date: 17 November 2011
- Publication place: Spain
- Media type: Print (hardcover and paperback)
- Pages: 288 pages
- ISBN: 978-0062206282
- Preceded by: The Angel's Game
- Followed by: The Labyrinth of Spirits

The Prisoner of Heaven (original title: El prisionero del cielo) is a 2011 book written by Carlos Ruiz Zafón. Originally published in Spanish, it was later translated to English by Lucia Graves. This is the third novel in the series Cemetery of Forgotten Books written by the author.

The book begins one year after the wedding of Daniel Sempere and Beatriz Aguliar. This is a direct sequel to Zafon's first novel in the series The Shadow of the Wind.

== Plot summary ==
Daniel Sempere has settled into married life well and his son is shortly turning one year old. He is living above the family bookshop, Sempere & Sons with his elderly father, his wife Beatriz and son Julian. Though business has declined further in recent years, his friend Fermín Romero de Torres still finds a place at the bookshop and continues to source rare books while bringing a smile to the faces of the customers.

One day a mysterious man arrives and asks about a rare and expensive copy of The Count of Monte Cristo that is kept in a display case behind the counter. He purchases the book from Don Sempere Snr and writes an inscription on the cover page:

"For Fermín Romero de Torres, who came back from among the dead and holds the key to the future."

The book is left as a gift for Fermín. When he returns to the bookshop later he is upset by the gift. It is revealed that Fermín was in prison 20 years earlier with the mysterious stranger as well as David Martin (the protagonist of Zafón's second novel The Angel's Game). While in prison Fermín, inspired by the story of The Count of Monte Cristo, escaped by taking the place of a dead cell mate, stealing a key from the stranger. Knowing the stranger has finally tracked him down, Fermín, with the help of Daniel, attempts to locate the man and come to an arrangement before he is required to pay the ultimate price.

== Themes ==
The morality of men's action during war is explored throughout the book and is contrasted with acceptable behaviour post-war. Deception plays a large role in how the characters interact with each other and the influence their lies have on their future (e.g. Fermín's explanation of his past to the Semperes, Daniel's avoidance of his marital problems).

== Impact on The Angel's Game ==
The Prisoner of Heaven highlights the unreliability of the narrator in The Angel's Game and sheds light on the mental instability of David Martin who has fallen further into insanity in the flashbacks from Fermín's time in prison. As a result, major aspects of The Angel's Game are called into question including whether David was ever truly healed of his brain tumour.

== Structure and style ==
Like Zafon's earlier novels, The Prisoner of Heaven follows a non-linear structure. The core of the book is written in the first person from Daniel's point of view; however, the plot relies on flashbacks in the third person.
