= The Word (radio programme) =

BBC World Service radio programme

The Word is a weekly half-hour radio programme on the BBC World Service about books and writers. Its final edition was in October 2008. Once a month its slot was taken over by World Book Club, in which listeners submitted questions to a famous writer. Both programmes were presented by Harriett Gilbert. World Book Club continues to be broadcast once a month on Saturdays.

== The Word ==
The Word emerged from an earlier World Service book programme Meridian Books (which had several presenters, including Michael Rosen, Verity Sharp, and Rosemary Hartill,) as well as a poetry request programme, Poems by Post.

Each week the programme would typically feature an author interview and a report on a topic such as "new Malaysian writing".

Each edition was broadcast on the BBC World Service several times during the week. It could also be heard online anytime during the week of transmission on the BBC website.

In Harriett Gilbert's absences, the programme has been presented by, among others, Bidisha and Nii Ayikwei Parkes.

== World Book Club ==
On the last Tuesday of each month World Book Club took over the slot of The Word. In October 2008, it became an hour-long programme under the umbrella of the arts show The Strand and is broadcast on the first Saturday in the month.

== Quote ==
Harriett Gilbert has said about the programmes:

"For a book addict, I have the dream job. On The Word, I get to talk about their work with writers I admire and enjoy. On World Book Club, I introduce those writers to their readers, all around the world and sit back while they enjoy themselves. If only Charles Dickens were still alive!"

== See also ==
- World Book Club
- The Strand
