= Bidisha =

British broadcaster and journalist (born 1978)

- Born: Bidisha Bandyopadhyay; 29 July 1978 (age 48); London, England, UK
- Education: Haberdashers' Aske's School for Girls; St Edmund Hall, Oxford; London School of Economics
- Occupations: Broadcaster, journalist, presenter, critic, anchor, multimedia artist
- Writing career
- Period: 1993–present
- Website: bidisha-online.blogspot.com

Bidisha Mamata (born 29 July 1978), known professionally as Bidisha, is a British TV broadcaster and presenter specialising in international affairs and human rights, political analysis, the arts, and culture. She is also a multimedia artist, making films and stills.

Bidisha began writing professionally for style magazines such as i-D, Dazed and Confused, and the NME, at the age of 14, and published her first novel at the age of 18. She writes for The Guardian and The Observer and works as a TV and radio critic and presenter for the BBC, Sky News, ITN, Channel 5 and CNN.

== Early life and education ==
Bidisha went to school at Haberdashers' Aske's School for Girls in Elstree, Hertfordshire. In 1999, she graduated in English Language and Literature from St Edmund Hall at the University of Oxford. She then studied at the London School of Economics, where she gained an MSc degree in Moral and Political Philosophy and Economic History.

== Writing ==
Bidisha began writing for arts magazines i-D, Oyster, Volume, Dazed and Confused, and the NME at 15, after launching a style fanzine at the age of 14, influenced by the riot grrrl subculture. In 1995, at the age of 16, Bidisha signed a £15,000 book deal with HarperCollins. Her first novel, Seahorses, was published two years later, during her first year at university. During this time she also had regular opinion columns in The Big Issue magazine, The Daily Telegraph and the Thursday edition of The Independent newspaper. Bidisha's second novel, the thriller Too Fast to Live, was published when she was 21. Her third book, Venetian Masters – a travel memoir – was published in February 2008. She was a contributing editor of the women's literary magazine Sibyl and the style magazine 2nd Generation, and has written for The Guardian, the Financial Times, Mslexia, The Observer, the New Statesman, and arts magazine The List.

International affairs were the subject of Venetian Masters (2008), which focused on northern Italy, and Beyond the Wall (2012), a work of reportage. In 2013, she became a Fellow of the International Reporting Project run by Johns Hopkins University in Washington, DC, and the Bill & Melinda Gates Foundation. Her role is to focus on international health development issues as part of a global network of reporters. Her fifth book, Asylum and Exile: The Hidden Voices of London, is based on her long term outreach work with asylum seekers and refugees.

Bidisha was one of the judges for the 2009 Orange Prize for Fiction, and was announced as one of the judges of the 2010 John Llewellyn Rhys Prize. She is a patron of the SI Leeds Literary Prize for unpublished fiction by Black and Asian women in the UK. Bidisha is a trustee of the Booker Prize Foundation.

== Broadcasting and film-making ==
In parallel with her writing, Bidisha has developed a career as a radio and TV arts critic and presenter. She is a regular guest on The Big Questions and Sunday Morning Live (BBC One), and also appeared as a regular panellist on Newsnight Review (BBC Two). For BBC Radio 4 she has contributed regularly to and presented Saturday Review, Front Row, Archive on Four, Heart and Soul and Woman's Hour. She was one of the regular presenters of BBC Radio 3's flagship arts programme, Night Waves.

On the BBC World Service, she was a guest presenter of the books programme The Word, and was the regular presenter for The Strand. For BBC Radio 3 and Radio 4, she has presented documentaries on Carl Jung, Iris Murdoch, the role of text in art (in Texting Andy Warhol) and The Countertenor. On television, she presented BBC Four's Secret Life of Books series edition on Jane Eyre and the Archive on Four documentary Mustn't Grumble, on complaining.

In 2017, she directed the seven-minute solo project An Impossible Poison, which was commissioned by the arts organisation Speaking Volumes and premiered in Berlin in November 2017. Her next visual project was a series of video shorts called the Aurora series, of which the first is Aurora: All is Well(October 2020).

== Films ==
- An Impossible Poison, short film, 2017
- Aurora series, six short films, 2020–2023

== Bibliography ==
- Seahorses (Flamingo, 1997), ISBN 0-00-655030-4
- Too Fast to Live (Duckworth Publishing, 2000), ISBN 0-7156-3008-3
- Venetian Masters (Summersdale Publishers, 2008), ISBN 1-84024-634-0
- Beyond the Wall: Writing A Path Through Palestine (Seagull, 2012), ISBN 978-0-8574-20398
- Asylum and Exile: The Hidden Voices of London (Seagull, 2015), ISBN 978-0857422101
- The Future of Serious Art (Tortoise Media, 2020), ISBN 978-1800180093
