= Harriett Gilbert =

English writer, academic and broadcaster (born 1948)

- Born: August 25, 1948 (age 78); Hornsey, London, England
- Education: Rose Bruford College
- Occupations: Writer, academic and broadcaster
- Known for: Presenting BBC Radio arts and book programmes
- Father: Michael Gilbert

Harriett Sarah Gilbert (born 25 August 1948) is an English writer, academic and broadcaster, particularly of the arts and book programmes on the BBC World Service. Besides World Book Club on the World Service, she also presents A Good Read on BBC Radio 4. Before the programme was cancelled, she also presented the BBC World Service programme The Strand.

She is the daughter of the writer Michael Gilbert.

== Biography ==
Born in Hornsey, London, Gilbert studied at the French Lycée in London and at a succession of boarding schools. "Growing Pains" was her contribution to Truth, Dare or Promise: Girls Growing Up in the Fifties (1985), a collection of autobiographical writing. After graduating from drama school, she worked as an actor, as well as a nanny, a waitress, an artist's model and a clerk-typist. She began to write in her twenties.

She nominated A High Wind in Jamaica by Richard Hughes, first read to her by her father when she was eight years old, as a life-changing book. The one piece of advice her father, the writer Michael Gilbert, gave her about writing was: "For God's sake, don't use adverbs."

== Career ==
From 1983 to 1988, she was the literary editor of the New Statesman and, before that, of City Limits (1981–83). She has also contributed to Time Out, The Guardian, and The Washington Post.

From 1992, she lectured in the Department of Journalism at the City University, London, where until 2008 she was also the programme director of the MA Creative Writing (novels) course.

She wrote two short animated films, directed by Marjut Rimminen: The Stain (1992) and Many Happy Returns (1997).

Gilbert presents one programme on BBC World Service radio: World Book Club, broadcast on the first Saturday in each month. About presenting for the World Service, Gilbert has said: "I think I'm doing the dream job, I just love it, and I can't think of anywhere else I'd like to be."

Gilbert has introduced the World Service arts documentary series Close Up. In 2008, she stood in as presenter of the arts programme The Ticket. She previously presented the World Service's dedicated book programme The Word. Besides this, she has also presented arts programmes for BBC Radio 4, BBC Radio 3 and BBC Four television.

In 2011, she replaced Sue MacGregor as presenter of the Radio 4 book programme A Good Read.

Writer and broadcaster Michael Rosen called her "one of the very best presenters of arts programmes on radio or TV". The Financial Times said of her, "the splendid Harriett Gilbert [...] painfully shows up certain would-be arty Radio 4 colleagues".

She is the author of six novels, including Hotels With Empty Rooms and The Riding Mistress. Her non-fiction books include A Women's History of Sex and The Sexual Imagination from Acker to Zola. She scripted the short animated film The Stain (1991).

As of 2009, although she has not published a novel since 1983, she hoped to return to writing.

She was a judge of the 2011 Independent Foreign Fiction Prize.

== Personal life ==
She comes from a family of writers: her father Michael Gilbert wrote crime fiction; her paternal grandfather, Bernard Gilbert, was a poet, novelist and playwright; and her paternal grandmother, Berwyn Cuthbert, was a journalist. Harriett Gilbert lives in London with her painter husband, Robin Hazlewood.

== Bibliography ==
- I Know Where I've Been – Harper and Row (USA) (1972). ISBN 0-06-011522-X
- Hotels With Empty Rooms – Harpercollins (1973). ISBN 0-06-011519-X
- An Offence Against the Persons – Hodder & Stoughton (1974). ISBN 0-340-18520-1
- Given the Ammunition – Harper and Row (1976). ISBN 0-06-011514-9 (published in the UK as Tide Race – Constable (1977). ISBN 0-09-461570-5)
- Running Away - Harper and Row (USA) (1979). ISBN 978-006021972-7 – a novel for young adults
- The Riding Mistress – Constable (1983). ISBN 0-09-464990-1
- "Growing Pains" in Liz Heron (ed.), Truth, Dare or Promise: Girls Growing Up in the Fifties – Virago (1985). ISBN 0-86068-596-9 – autobiographical essay
- A Women's History of Sex – Pandora (1987) (illustrated by Christine Roche). ISBN 0-86358-142-0
- The Sexual Imagination: From Acker to Zola – A Feminist Companion – Jonathan Cape (1993). ISBN 0-224-03535-5 (published in the US as Fetishes, Florentine Girdles, and Other Explorations into the Sexual Imagination – Harpercollins (1994). ISBN 0-06-273313-3)
- Writing for Journalists – Routledge (1999) (with Wynford Hicks and Sally Adams). ISBN 0-415-18445-2
