= Lucia Graves =

English writer and translator (1943)

Lucia Graves (born 21 July 1943) is an English writer and translator, working in English and Spanish/Catalan. Her translations include the worldwide bestsellers The Shadow of the Wind, The Angel's Game, The Prisoner of Heaven, and The Labyrinth of Spirits, by Carlos Ruiz Zafón. She has translated over 30 volumes.

== Biography ==
Born in Devon, England, she is the daughter of writer Robert Graves and his second wife, Beryl Pritchard (1915–2003). Her parents moved her and her family to Deyá, Mallorca, Spain, shortly after the end of World War II, where she spent her childhood. She grew up in Mallorca from the age of three, speaking English at home, Catalan with locals, and Spanish at school. "I slipped in and out of my three languages as one enters and exits different-coloured rooms in a house," she writes in her memoir. As a teenager she attended the International School of Geneva, Switzerland, and subsequently university at Oxford. After studying Hispanic Philosophy at the University of Oxford, she married Spanish musician Ramón Farrán Sánchez with whom she had three children. They settled in Barcelona where she began her career as a translator with English, Spanish, and Catalan.

Her professional translation work began in 1971 with her father's novel Seven Days in New Crete.

In 1991 she moved from Spain to London, where she currently lives with her second husband. There she has continued to do translation, mostly into English, and also wrote her memoir and novel. The novel, The Memory House, is about the expulsion of the Jewish population from Spain. In her memoir entitled A Woman Unknown: Voices from a Spanish Life, she writes about the lives of Spanish women during the Franco regime and Spain´s transition into democracy after his death. These were both originally written in English, but Graves herself did the translations into Spanish. She said "I find self-translation a rather strange, slightly uncomfortable experience; the line between author and translator becomes blurred".

She has also composed the lyrics to several different songs, of which include Gotas de Fuego, written alongside her husband at the time, Ramón Farrán Sanchez, and interpreted by José José en his album in 1977 Reencuentro. Additionally, the famous singer María Del Mar Bonet put music to the poem The Secret Land by Robert Graves that gave title to the record, which Lucia Graves then translated into Catalan: Terra Secreta.

In total, Lucia Graves has translated over 30 different volumes, of which include the world renowned The Shadow of the Wind and The Angel´s Game by Carlos Ruiz Zafón, and The Columbus Papers, Christopher Columbus´s controversial Barcelona letter of 1493.

== Translations ==
=== Translations into English ===
- Tribute to Rafael Alberti by various authors
- The Columbus Papers by Maurico Obregón (translated Christopher Columbus’s controversial Barcelona letter of 1493)
- Los Pazos de Ulloa by E. Pardo Bazán
- Poems of the Industrial Estate by Antonio Rico
- The Shadow of the Wind by Carlos Ruiz Zafón
- The Angel’s Game by Carlos Ruiz Zafón
- The Prince of Mist by Carlos Ruiz Zafón
- The Midnight Palace by Carlos Ruiz Zafón
- The Prisoner of Heaven by Carlos Ruiz Zafón

=== The majority of her translations into Spanish and Catalan are her father’s works ===
- The Memory House by Lucia Graves. Her first fiction novel written in English and self-translated into Spanish
- Seven Days in New Crete by Robert Graves
- They Hanged my Saintly Billy: Difficult Questions, Easy Answers by Robert Graves
- An Ancient Castle by Robert Graves
- The Shout and Other Stories by Robert Graves
- The Golden Fleece by Robert Graves
- The Big Green Book by Robert Graves
- Diary VI (1955-66) by Anaïs Nin
- Diary VII (1966-74) by Anaïs Nin
- The Greek Myths (abridged ed.) by Robert Graves
- Olive Tree: Poems by Robert Graves
- The Siege and Fall of Troy by Robert Graves
- Greek Gods and Heroes by Robert Graves
- Two Wise Children by Robert Graves
- Wife to Mr Milton by Robert Graves
- Selection of Poems by Robert Graves
- Robert Graves: Selected Letters edited by Paul O’Prey
- Ava Gardner, My Story by Ava Gardner
- Biography of Robert Graves by Richard P Graves
- Selected Short Stories by Katherine Mansfield
- Selected Essays by Robaves ert Gr
- My Head! My Head! by Robert Graves
- Majorca Observed by Robert Graves

=== Translations into Catalan: All works written by her father ===
- George Sand in Majorca by Robert Graves
- Olive Tree: Poems by Robert Graves
- A Dead Branch on the Tree of Israel by Robert Graves

In an interview with The Independent, Lucia Graves said, "Every time I rendered one of my father's books into Spanish or Catalan, I could hear his voice as if he were talking to me over my shoulder, even in those last years, when he had stopped speaking and lived in a world of bewildering silence, having lost his grip on reality."

== Awards and honours ==
- 2012 Science Fiction & Fantasy Translation Awards, finalist, translation of Midnight Palace by Carlos Ruiz Zafón
