= The Shadow of the Wind =

2001 novel by Carlos Ruiz Zafón

- First US edition
- Author: Carlos Ruiz Zafón
- Original title: La sombra del viento
- Translator: Lucia Graves
- Language: Spanish
- Series: Cemetery of Forgotten Books
- Genre: Mystery
- Publisher: Planeta (Spain); Penguin Books (USA); Weidenfeld & Nicolson & Orion Books (UK)
- Publication date: 2001
- Publication place: Spain
- Media type: Print (hardcover and paperback)
- Pages: 565
- ISBN: 84-08-05793-6
- OCLC: 68085235
- Dewey Decimal: 863/.64 22
- LC Class: PQ6668.U49 Z34 2004
- Followed by: The Angel's Game

The Shadow of the Wind (Spanish: La sombra del viento) is a 2001 novel by the Spanish writer Carlos Ruiz Zafón and a worldwide bestseller. It is the first book in the series Cemetery of Forgotten Books. The book was translated into English in 2004 by Lucia Graves and sold over a million copies in the UK after already achieving success on mainland Europe, topping the Spanish bestseller lists for weeks. It was published in the United States by Penguin Books and in Great Britain by Weidenfeld & Nicolson and Orion Books. It is believed to have sold 15 million copies worldwide, making it one of the best-selling books of all time.

Ruiz Zafón's follow-up, The Angel's Game, is a prequel to The Shadow of the Wind. His third in the series, The Prisoner of Heaven, is the sequel to The Shadow of the Wind.

== Plot summary ==
The novel is actually a story within a story. The novel opens in the 1940s with the protagonist, Daniel, a boy whose father owns a bookshop in Barcelona. One day, his father takes him to the Cemetery of Forgotten Books—a secret labyrinthine library that houses rare and banned books. Daniel is drawn to one called The Shadow of the Wind by Julián Carax and takes it home with him. Daniel quickly reads and falls in love with the story. He soon discovers that the book's mysterious author, Carax, has gone missing along with every other copy of The Shadow of the Wind and most of his other works. Daniel then sets out to find out what happened to the author and his books.

When word gets around that Daniel possesses the only known copy of The Shadow of the Wind, he receives an inquiry from Gustavo Barceló, a rare-book seller and expert on Carax who wishes to purchase it. Daniel refuses to sell it, but soon falls in love with Barceló's blind niece, Clara, and begins to pay frequent visits to read The Shadow of the Wind to her. However, she is several years older and does not reciprocate his feelings. His possession of the book also attracts the attention of a mysterious stranger with a badly burned and disfigured face named Lain Coubert (the name of the character of the devil in the book) who is also trying to get his hands on it.

Daniel befriends a man who goes by the alias of Fermín Romero de Torres, who was imprisoned and tortured in Montjuïc Castle as a result of his involvement in espionage against the government during the Civil War. After being hired as an assistant in his father's bookshop, he helps Daniel investigate the mystery of Carax. But their probing into the murky past of a number of people who have been either long dead or long forgotten unleashes the dark forces of the murderous Inspector Fumero.

Thus, unravelling a long story that has been buried in the depths of oblivion, Daniel and Fermín come across a love story, the beautiful yet tragic story of Julián and Penélope, both of whom seem to have been missing since 1919—that is, nearly thirty years earlier. Julián, who was the son of the hatter Antoni Fortuny and his wife Sophie Carax, and Penélope Aldaya, the only daughter of the extremely wealthy Don Ricardo Aldaya and his beautiful, narcissistic American wife, developed an instant love for each other. They lived a clandestine relationship only through casual furtive glances and faint smiles for around four years, after which they decided to elope to Paris, unaware that the shadows of misfortune had been closing in on them ever since they had met. The two lovers are doomed to unknown fates just a week before their supposed elopement, which is meticulously planned by Julián's best friend, Miquel Moliner—also the son of a wealthy father. It is eventually revealed that Miquel loved Julián more than any brother and finally sacrificed his own life for him, having already abandoned his desires and his youth for causes of charity and his friend's well-being after his elopement to Paris—although without Penélope, who never turned up for the rendezvous.

Penélope's memory keeps burning in Julián's heart, and this eventually forces him to return to Barcelona (in the mid 1930s); however he encounters the harsh truth about Penélope, nothing more than a memory to those who knew her since disappearing in 1919. Daniel discovers, from the note Nuria Monfort (the wife of the deceased Miquel Moliner) left for him, that Julián and Penélope are actually half-brother and sister; her father had an affair with his mother and Julián was the result. The worst thing he learns is that after Julián left, Penélope's parents imprisoned her because they were ashamed of her committing incest with him and she was pregnant with his child. Penélope gave birth to a son named David Aldaya, who was stillborn. Penélope died in childbirth, due to her parents' ignoring her cries for help, and her body was placed in the family crypt along with her child's. When returning to the Aldaya Mansion, Julián is enraged and embittered by the news of his love's death along with their child's. He hates every wasted second of his life without Penélope and hates his books all the more. He begins to burn all of his novels and calls himself Lain Coubert.

After finishing reading the book, Daniel marries Beatriz "Bea" Aguilar, whom he has loved for a long time and assisted him in his quest to unravel the Carax mystery, in 1956. Soon after, Bea gives birth to a son. Daniel names his son Julián Sempere, in honor of Julián Carax. In 1966, Daniel takes his son to the Cemetery of Forgotten Books, where The Shadow of the Wind is kept.

== Critical reception ==
The novel received mostly positive reviews from literary critics.

Stephen King wrote, "If you thought the true gothic novel died with the 19th century, this will change your mind. Shadow is the real deal." Entertainment Weekly assigned the book a grade of A, describing the book as "wondrous" and noting that "there are places in which the book might seem a little over-the-top (doomed love, gruesome murders) but for Zafon's masterful, meticulous plotting and extraordinary control over language". In a Washington Post review, Michael Dirda wrote that it is

a long novel that will remind readers of a good many other novels. This isn't meant as criticism but as an indication of the story's richness and architectonic intricacy. ... If you love A.S. Byatt's Possession: A Romance, Garcia Marquez's One Hundred Years of Solitude, the short stories of Borges, Umberto Eco's The Name of the Rose, Arturo Perez-Reverte's The Club Dumas or Paul Auster's "New York" trilogy, not to mention Victor Hugo's Hunchback of Notre Dame and William Hjortsberg's Falling Angel, then you will love The Shadow of the Wind.

The Guardian considered that "Zafón's novel is atmospheric, beguiling and thoroughly readable, but ultimately lacks the magic its early chapters promise". The San Francisco Chronicle gave the book a negative review, opining that "the combined effect of the foggy setting and soggy writing is of being lost in a swamp."

== See also ==
- Tibidabo
