= Culture Shock (radio programme) =

British radio programme

- Genre: All-news radio
- Country of origin: United Kingdom
- Language: English
- Home station: BBC World Service
- Hosted by: Tim Marlow
- Original release: 2005 – 2008

Culture Shock is a weekly BBC World Service radio programme, hosted by Tim Marlow. The programme ran from 2005 to 2008.

== Format ==
The programme aimed to examine "the latest cultural trends from around the world, social or technological developments which are reflecting and shaping the way we live: what are people thinking, buying, or doing and why; the next wave of telecommunications, the latest design craze or toy, new ways to entertain, future behaviours".

== Guests ==
Among guests on the programme were:

- James Harkin, author of Big Ideas: The Essential Guide to the Latest Thinking
- Mark Katz, the author of Capturing Sound: How Technology Has Changed Music
- Professor Gerd Gigerenzer
- David Levy, author of Love and Sex with Robots
- Professor Clay Shirky from New York University
- Professor Peter Singer
- Jeff Taylor of Monster.com
