= Richard Holmes (military historian) =

British military historian (1946–2011)

- Holmes around 2005
- Born: Edward Richard Holmes; 29 March 1946; Aldridge, Staffordshire, England
- Died: 30 April 2011 (aged 65); Hampshire, England
- Education: University of Cambridge; Northern Illinois University; University of Reading
- Occupations: Professor of Military and Security Studies
- Employer: Cranfield University
- Military career
- Allegiance: United Kingdom
- Branch: British Army (TA)
- Service years: 1964–2000
- Rank: Brigadier
- Service number: 483090
- Unit: Queen's Regiment
- Awards: Commander of the Order of the British Empire; Territorial Decoration; Volunteer Reserves Service Medal

Edward Richard Holmes, CBE, TD, VR, JP (29 March 1946 – 30 April 2011), known as Richard Holmes, was a British military historian, soldier and broadcaster. He was co-director of Cranfield University's Security and Resilience Group from 1989 to 2009 and became professor of Military and Security Studies at Cranfield in 1995.

== Early life and education ==
Holmes was educated at Forest School, Walthamstow; Emmanuel College, Cambridge; Northern Illinois University; and the University of Reading, where he was awarded a PhD in 1975.

== Military career ==
In 1964, he enlisted in the Territorial Army, the volunteer reserve of the British Army. Two years later he received a commission as a second lieutenant with the Territorial Army, and was promoted to lieutenant on 17 June 1968. He was promoted to acting captain in 1972, substantive captain in 1973, acting major in 1978 and substantive major in 1980. In 1979, he was awarded the Territorial Decoration.

Holmes was promoted to lieutenant-colonel in 1986, whereupon he transferred to and took command of the 2nd Battalion, The Wessex Regiment (Volunteers), filling the appointment until 1988. In the 1988 Queen's Birthday Honours, he was appointed Officer of the Order of the British Empire (OBE) (Military Division). He was promoted to colonel on 29 January 1989. In June 1991, he was appointed aide-de-camp to the Queen, holding the post until February 1997.

In January 1994, he was appointed Honorary Colonel of the Southampton University Officer Training Corps, and that February he was appointed brigadier of the Territorial Army at Headquarters Land Command.

In 1995, he became Professor of Military and Security Studies at Cranfield University. From 1997 until his retirement in 2000, Holmes was Director General, Reserve Forces and Cadets, the Army's senior reservist. In the 1998 New Year Honours, he was promoted to Commander of the Order of the British Empire (CBE) (Military Division).

From September 1999 to 1 February 2007, he was Colonel of the Regiment of the Princess of Wales's Royal Regiment (successor to The Queen's and Royal Hampshire Regiments). On 19 September 2000, he was awarded the Volunteer Reserves Service Medal.

== Academic career ==
Between 1969 and 1985, Holmes was a lecturer at the Department of War Studies at the RMA Sandhurst, becoming Deputy Head of the department in 1984.

In 1989 he was appointed as the co-director of Cranfield University's Security Studies Institute at the Royal Military College of Science, at Shrivenham. He became Professor of Military and Security Studies there in 1995, retiring from both positions, although retaining some part-time responsibilities in 2009.

Holmes was also President of the British Commission for Military History, and the Battlefields Trust. He was also a patron of the Guild of Battlefield Guides. He received the Order of the Dannebrog and held honorary doctorates from the universities of Leicester and Kent.

== Publications and broadcasting ==
Holmes wrote more than twenty published books, including Firing Line and Redcoat, and was also Editor-in-Chief of the Oxford University Press' Companion to Military History.

His television works included writing and presenting documentary series on the American War of Independence, such as Rebels and Redcoats in 2003 and Battlefields, a series concentrating on the bloody battles of the Second World War. His War Walks television series has been regularly repeated on British terrestrial and digital television channels, including BBC Two and UKTV History. One of his documentary series was Wellington: The Iron Duke, in which he chronicled the Duke of Wellington's life, travelling to India, to Waterloo and numerous other locations.

He used a similar format in his series, In the Footsteps of Churchill, a documentary on Winston Churchill. In this, he travelled across the world, including South Africa, Sudan, Egypt and various locations in the United Kingdom and Europe. He also wrote a book to accompany the series.

He presented an episode-length profile of Oliver Cromwell for the BBC television series Great Britons in 2002. A popular vote ranked Cromwell number ten out of one hundred "greatest Britons".

In 2003 he presented Britain's Finest Castles, part of an eight-part documentary series for Channel 5.

== Personal life ==
Holmes married Katharine Saxton in 1975, with whom he had two daughters.

Holmes died on 30 April 2011, aged 65, from the effects of non-Hodgkin's lymphoma.

== Bibliography ==
- Bir Hacheim: Desert Citadel (1971) ISBN 978-0-345-02405-3
- The English Civil War: A Military History of Three Civil Wars 1642-1651 (co-author Peter Young, 1974) ISBN 978-0-413-29440-1
- The Little Field Marshal: A Life of Sir John French (1981) ISBN 978-0-224-01575-2
- The Road to Sedan: The French Army 1866–1870 (1984) ISBN 978-0-391-03163-0
- Soldiers: A History of Men in Battle (co-author John Keegan, 1985) ISBN 978-0-241-11583-1
- Firing Line (1985) ISBN 978-0-224-02043-5
- Acts of War: The Behaviour of Men in Battle (1986) ISBN 978-0-02-915020-7
- Civil War Battles in Cornwall, 1642 to 1646 (1989) ISBN 978-0-948087-32-5
- World Atlas of Warfare: Military Innovations That Changed the Course of History (1988) ISBN 978-0-670-81967-6
- Fatal Avenue: A Traveller's History of the Battlefields of Northern France and Flanders 1346–1945 (1992) ISBN 978-0-224-03600-9
- Riding the Retreat: Mons to Marne: 1914 Revisited (1995) ISBN 978-0-224-03762-4
- Battle: Eyewitness Books (1995) ISBN 978-0-789-46473-6
- War Walks: From Agincourt to Normandy (1996) ISBN 978-0-563-38749-7
- War Walks 2: From the Battle of Hastings to the Blitz (1997) ISBN 978-0-563-38386-4
- The Western Front (1999) ISBN 978-1-57500-147-0
- The Second World War in Photographs (2000) ISBN 978-1-84222-073-3
- The First World War in Photographs (2001) ISBN 978-1-84222-319-2
- The Oxford Companion to Military History (2001) ISBN 978-0-198-66209-9
- Battlefields of the Second World War (2001) ISBN 978-0-563-53782-3
- Redcoat: The British Soldier in the Age of Horse and Musket (2001) ISBN 978-0-00-257097-8
- Wellington: The Iron Duke (2002) ISBN 978-0-00-713748-0; pbk 0-00-713750-8 (2003)
- Acts of War: The Behaviour of Men in Battle (2003) ISBN 978-0-297-84668-0
- The D-Day Experience: From the Invasion to the Liberation of Paris (2004) ISBN 978-1-84442-805-2
- Tommy: The British Soldier on the Western Front (2004) ISBN 978-0-00-713751-0
- In the Footsteps of Churchill (2005) ISBN 978-0-563-52176-1
- The Napoleonic Wars Experience (2006) ISBN 978-0-233-00198-2
- Sahib: The British Soldier in India 1750–1914 (2005) ISBN 978-0-00-713753-4
- Dusty Warriors: Modern Soldiers at War (2006) ISBN 978-0-00-721284-2
- Battlefield: Decisive Conflicts in History (2006) ISBN 978-84-344-1335-1
- The World at War: The Landmark Oral History from the Previously Unpublished Archives (2007) ISBN 978-0-09-191751-7
- Marlborough: England's Fragile Genius (2008) ISBN 978-0-00-722571-2
- Shots from the Front: The British Soldier 1914–18 (2008) ISBN 978-0-00-727548-9
- Soldiers: Army Lives and Loyalties from Redcoats to Dusty Warriors (2011) ISBN 978-0-00-722569-9
