= Tim Marlow =

English writer and art historian

Tim Marlow OBE
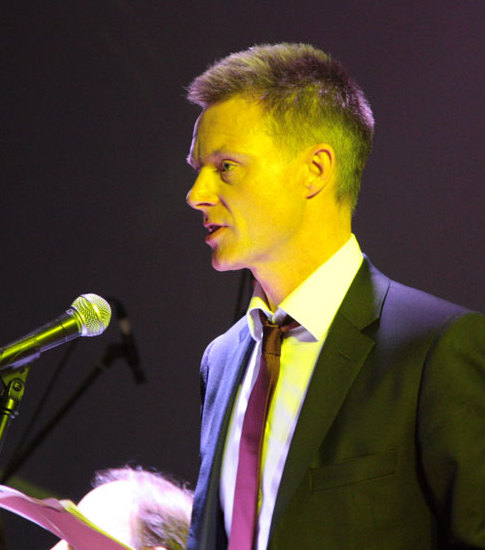
- Marlow in 2011
- Born: 1962 (age 63–64); Derbyshire, UK
- Education: Denstone College; Courtauld Institute

Timothy John Marlow OBE (born 1962) is a British writer, broadcaster and art historian who is the Director and Chief Executive of the Design Museum, London. Prior to this role, he was the Artistic Director of the Royal Academy of Arts in London. He has lectured on art and culture in over 40 countries.

He has written and presented over 100 documentaries for radio and television. Before moving to the Royal Academy, he was the Director of Exhibitions at White Cube for over ten years. In 2019, he was appointed as the new chief executive and director of London's Design Museum.

== Early life and education ==
Marlow was born in Long Eaton in Derbyshire, England and grew up in Chesterfield. Marlow is a fan of football side Chelsea FC, regularly attending matches at Stamford Bridge with his son. He was educated at Denstone College, a boarding independent school for boys (now co-educational), in the village of Denstone in Staffordshire in central England and at the Courtauld Institute of Art, from which he gained a Master's degree.

== Career ==
Marlow has presented numerous art programmes on UK television including studies of J. M. W. Turner for the BBC, Great Art for ITV (Seventh Art Productions, Phil Grabsky), Great Artists with Tim Marlow (Seventh Art Productions, Phil Grabsky), The Nude in Art with Tim Marlow (Seventh Art Productions, Phil Grabsky), living artists, The Impressionists with Tim Marlow (Seventh Art Productions, Phil Grabsky), the Tate Modern, the Metropolitan Museum of Art in New York City, Raphael, etc. He has written about art and culture for The Times, The Guardian, The Independent on Sunday, Arena, Art Monthly, Blueprint and many other newspapers and periodicals. In 1993, he founded Tate: The Art Magazine. From 1991 to 1998, he presented BBC Radio 4's arts programme Kaleidoscope, for which he won a Sony Award. Marlow also presented the weekly BBC World Service cultural discussion programme Culture Shock from 2002-2008.

From 2014 until 2019, Marlow served as the Artistic Director of the Royal Academy of Arts in London. Following a staffing shake-up in 2014, he also oversaw the RA's Collections, Learning, Publishing and Architecture departments. During his time at the RA, he was a central figure in preparations for events accompanying its 250th anniversary celebrations, coinciding with the completion of a major building project to expand the institution's exhibition spaces and link its two historic buildings.

His books and monographs include studies of the French sculptor Auguste Rodin, the Austrian expressionist painter Egon Schiele and a survey of great artists published by Faber and Faber. He is visiting lecturer at Winchester School of Art. He is an examiner on the Sculpture MA and former creative director of sculpture at Goodwood.

Marlow was appointed Officer of the Order of the British Empire (OBE) in the 2020 New Year Honours for services to the arts.

== Publications ==
=== Publications ===
- Rodin. 1995.
- Schiele. 1999.

=== Publications (co-author) ===
- Grenville Davey 1994. Marlow, James Roberts, and Isabelle Rein Harez.
- Anthony Caro: The Cascades Sculptures. 1993. A. Caro and Marlow.
- David Mach. Art & Design Monographs. 1995. Paul Bonaventura and Marlow.
- The Great Artists: From Giotto to Turner. 2002. Phil Grabsky and Marlow.
- David Mach. 2002. Victor De Circasia, Paul Bonaventura, and Marlow.

== Television programmes ==
=== Series ===
- Great Art Series One (2001), Seventh Art Productions (Phil Grabsky), commissioned by ITV
- Great Art Series Two (2003), Seventh Art Productions (Phil Grabsky), commissioned by ITV
- Great Artists with Tim Marlow – Constable (2006), Seventh Art Productions, directed by Phil Grabsky, Ben Harding, and Andrew Hutton
- Easter in Art
- Judgement Day: Images of Heaven & Hell
- The Nude in Art with Tim Marlow (2010), directed by Phil Grabsky
- The Impressionists with Tim Marlow, directed by Phil Grabsky
- Marlow Meets …
- The Art of the Portrait
- Britain's Finest Series One Episode 3 Ancient Monuments (2003), Lion Television part of All3Media, Director Sabine Pusch, Producer Peter Sommer, commissioned by Channel 5.
- Britain's Finest Series Two Episode 3 Treasures (2005), Lion Television part of All3Media, Director and Producer Sabine Pusch, commissioned by Channel 5.

=== One-offs ===
- Tim Marlow with… Gilbert & George
- Tim Marlow on… Hogarth with Ian Hislop
- Tim Marlow on… Holbein in England
- Tim Marlow on… Carsten Holler at Tate Modern
- Tim Marlow on… Velazquez
- Tim Marlow on… Modern Art Oxford
- Tim Marlow on… Constable: the Great Landscapes
- Tim Marlow on… Highlights of the new Tate Modern
- Tim Marlow on… Kandinsky: the Path to Abstraction
- Tim Marlow on… Henri Rousseau: Jungles in Paris
- Tim Marlow on… Rubens: a Master in the Making
- Tim Marlow on… Degas, Sickert & Toulouse-Lautrec
- Tim Marlow on… the British Art Show
- Tim Marlow on… Stubbs & the Horse
- Tim Marlow on… Caravaggio: the Final Years
- Tim Marlow on… the Museum of Modern Art, New York
- Tim Marlow on… The National Gallery's Grand Tour
- Tim Marlow on… David Hockney
- Venice Biennale 2001
- High Five
