= Rebels and Redcoats =

- Titlecard
- Genre: Historical documentary
- Narrated by: Richard Holmes
- Country of origin: United Kingdom
- Original language: English
- No. of series: 1
- No. of episodes: 4

Production
- Running time: 50 minutes
- Production companies: WGBH Boston; Granada Television; BBC Wales

Original release
- Network: BBC Two
- Release: 8 July – 29 July 2003

Rebels and Redcoats: How Britain Lost America is a British television documentary series about the story of the American Revolutionary War, presented and narrated by Richard Holmes, in four parts. Throughout the entire program there are clear explanations about the politics going on behind the scenes, the impact of other nations, like Canada and France, battle tactics and strategies, and weaponry, all following a beginning-to-end timeline. The impact of each geographic area is frequently emphasized, as there were often a division of loyalties not just in regions but also in neighborhoods. While being a British production, the viewpoint of many different groups are discussed in detail, including the difficult choices Native American Indians and black slaves were forced to make in choosing allegiances.

The series was produced by WGBH Boston and Granada Television in association with BBC Wales. It was aired in two parts in the United States by PBS in 2004. A book, written by Hugh Bicheno and with a foreword by Holmes, accompanied the series.

== Episode list ==
No.	Title	Original release date
1	"The Shot Heard Around the World"	8 July 2003
2	"American Crisis 1776"	15 July 2003
3	"The War Moves South"	22 July 2003
4	"The World Turned Upside Down"	29 July 2003

== Reception ==
Writing for the New York Times, Alessandra Stanley said:

[The documentary] is an engaging upside-down look at a period of American history that few Americans ever question. It may not be exactly fair – the British bias is blatant – but it is fairly accurate. Mostly, it gives viewers a sense of the world's more jaundiced view of a revolution that Americans cherish as a triumph of democracy and human rights. And a little like Michael Moore's polemical films, the documentary delivers its most striking indictments not in the facts but in the sly visual juxtapositions.

— Alessandra Stanley, New York Times
