= John Waite (broadcaster) =

Presenter on British radio and occasionally television

Winston Anthony John Waite (born 26 February 1951) is a presenter on British radio and occasionally television. He has worked at the BBC since 1973.

== Early life ==
He was born in Stoke-on-Trent and raised in nearby Kidsgrove in Staffordshire. His father ran a corner shop. He went to Sandbach School in Sandbach and Wilmslow County Grammar School for Boys in Wilmslow from the age of 15. He studied English and American literature at the University of Manchester.

== Career ==
He joined the BBC as a graduate trainee in 1973. He then became a news presenter for BBC Radio London, before joining BBC Radio 4 as a presenteer in 1986.

=== BBC Radio 4 ===
Waite presents the BBC Radio 4 lunchtime consumer programme You and Yours, and the consumer affairs programme Face the Facts, having joined the programmes in 1986.

He has also presented documentaries, including an exclusive interview with witness "Bromley", the teenage girl whose outbursts during cross-questioning at the Old Bailey brought the Damilola Taylor murder trial to a halt. This particular broadcast led to "Bromley" being invited to 10 Downing Street to discuss ways of better protecting vulnerable young people giving evidence in court.

He says the worst moment in his career was being so keen to get his microphone close to Prince Charles that he stood heavily on his toe.

Waite was a spokesperson while his cousin, Terry Waite, was held hostage in Beirut in the 1990s. He remembers presenting a special programme for his cousin, which Terry managed to hear.

Waite has received numerous awards including a Radio Oscar (Sony) for Broadcaster of the Year.

He also hosts Pick of the Week on Radio 4.

=== Work outside BBC ===
Waite has also fronted the National Trust Magazine's audio version since its inception, and is the voice on The Economist’s weekly podcast.

In 1990 a John Waite BBC Radio 4 broadcast was sampled by electronic band The Orb and used on their Little Fluffy Clouds single. At the beginning of the track John Waite can clearly be heard saying "Over the past few years, to the traditional sounds of an English summer, the drone of lawnmowers, the smack of leather on willow, has been added a new noise...". The Single went on to be a Number 10 hit on a 1993 re-release.

John Waite does volunteer work as a guide & commentator to groups of people visiting the western part of the Highgate Cemetery.
