= Edebé =

Spanish Educational company

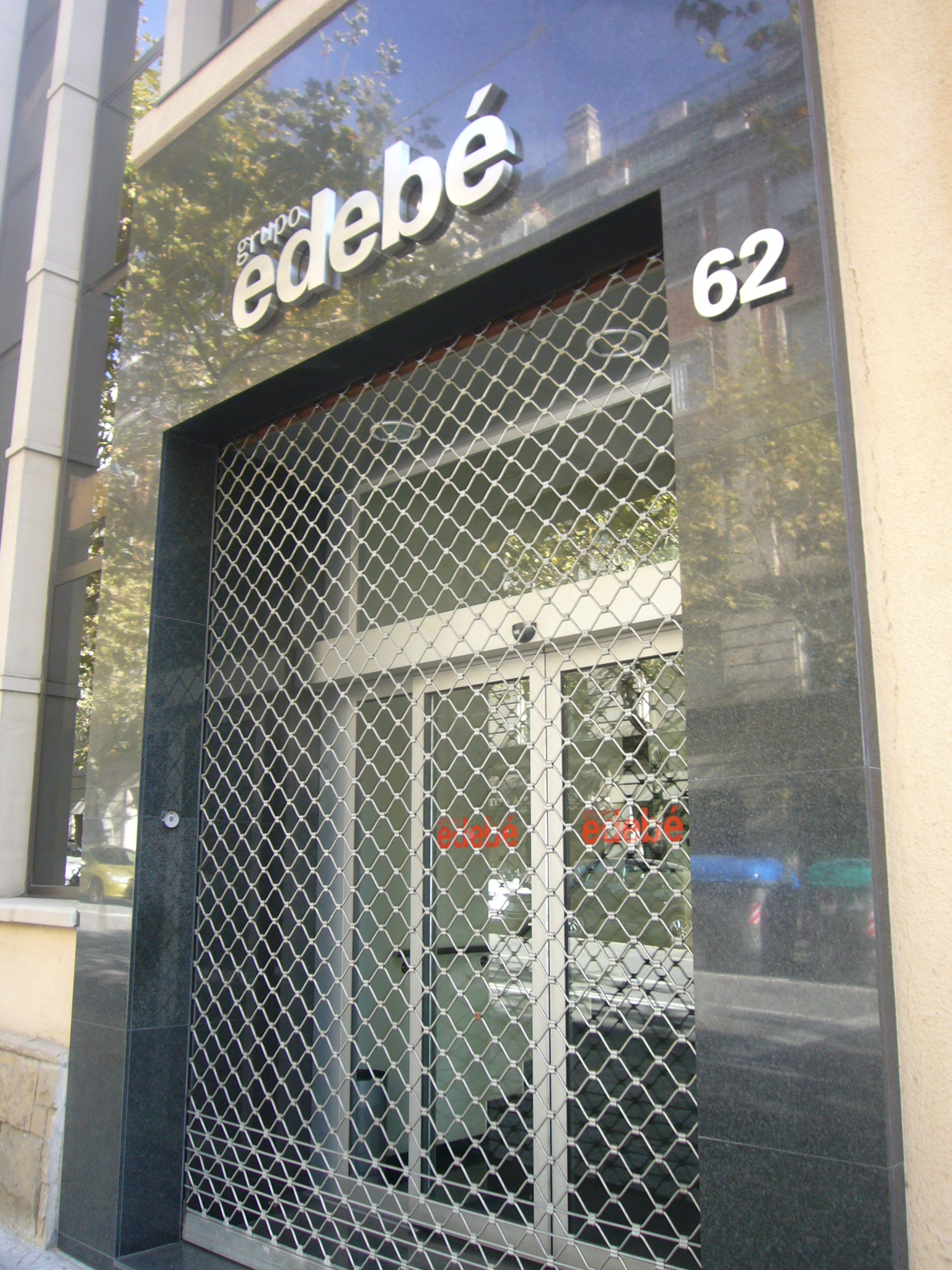
Editorial Edebé Headquarters

Edebé is an educational and children's publisher located in Barcelona. It was founded in 1888 by the Salesians of Don Bosco. Under the Edebé label, it publishes its catalog in Catalan and Spanish.
