= Face the Facts =

British radio programme (1986–2015)

- Genre: Radio documentary Talk radio
- Country of origin: United Kingdom
- Language: English
- Home station: BBC Radio 4
- Hosted by: John Waite
- Original release: 1986 – 2015

Face the Facts was a consumer affairs programme on BBC Radio 4, featuring investigative journalism, that ran from 1986 until 2015. Introduced by John Waite, cousin of the well-known humanitarian and churchman Terry Waite, it usually focused on individuals or organisations within the UK or Europe thought to be corrupt, engaged in malpractice or active criminality. The programme has imitated (and been imitated by) similar investigation shows in the UK, including the very similar The Cook Report (1985–98) on ITV.

In 2008, the show received the Radio Documentary Award from the One World Broadcasting Trust (OWBT) organisation. The award was given for "Lost in Translation", which OWM described as "a hard-hitting documentary about the use of local translators by British forces in Iraq, the dangers that those translators faced, and the lack of support from the people who hired them."
