= Louise Fryer =

British broadcaster on BBC Radio 3

Louise Fryer is a British broadcaster on BBC Radio 3.

After attending Clare College, Cambridge, where she read anthropology, Fryer briefly worked as an actress. She is a regular presenter of Afternoon on 3 and announcer on concert broadcasts. She has also worked for the World Service as a presenter.

Fryer is also an audio describer (for the National Theatre since 1993 and various museums) as well as being a reader of books for the Royal National Institute of Blind People. She has worked as an instructor of people working in the field and researched problems associated with the occupation at Goldsmiths College, University of London.

One of her two brothers is the music producer Andrew Fryer.
