= J. M. G. Le Clézio bibliography =

This is a list of works by J. M. G. Le Clézio, the French Nobel Laureate.

== Novels ==
Title in French	English translation	Date of French publication	Date of English publication	
Le Procès-Verbal	The Interrogation	1963	1963	
Le Jour où Beaumont fit connaissance avec sa douleur	-----------	1964	-----------	
Le Livre des fuites	The Book of Flights: An Adventure Story	1965	1971	
Le Déluge	The Flood	1966	1967	
Terra amata	Terra Amata	1969	1969	
La Guerre	War	1970	1973	
Les Géants	The Giants	1973	1975	
Voyages de l'autre côté	-----------	1975	-----------	
Désert	Desert	1980	2009	
Lullaby	-----------	1980	-----------	
Le Chercheur d'or	The prospector	1985	1993	
La Grande Vie	the Great Life	1986	1986	
Celui qui n'avait jamais vu la mer(suivi de La Montagne ou le dieu vivant)	The Boy Who Had Never Seen the Sea	1988	2008	
Onitsha	Onitsha	1991	1997	
Étoile errante	Wandering Star.	1992	2004	
La Quarantaine	-----------	1995	-----------	
Poisson d'or	-----------	1997	-----------	
Hasard suivi de Angoli Mala	-----------	1999	-----------	
Villa Aurore	-----------	1999	-----------	
Fantômes dans la rue	-----------	2000	-----------	
Révolutions	-----------	2003	-----------	
Ourania	-----------	2006	-----------	
Voyage au pays des arbres	-----------	2007	-----------	
Ritournelle de la faim	-----------	2008	-----------	
Alma	-----------	2017	-----------	-

== Children's books ==
Title in French	English translation	Date of French publication	Date of English publication
Lullaby	-----------	1980; ISBN 978-3-425-04914-4	-----------
La Grande Vie suivi de Peuple du ciel	La Grande Vie translated as The Great Life Peuple du ciel has not been translated into English	1980; ISBN 978-3-425-04861-1; ISBN 978-2-07-055179-8	1986
Peuple du ciel, suivi de 'Les Bergers	---------	1981; ISBN 978-2-07-042676-8	---------
Balaabilou	---------	1985; ISBN 978-2-07-054218-5	---------
Villa Aurore	---------	1999; ISBN 978-0-320-07922-1	---------
Villa Aurore; suivi de, Orlamonde	---------	1998; ISBN 978-2-07-051396-3	---------
L'enfant de sous le pont	-----------	2000; ISBN 2-914471-18-1	-----------
Celui qui n'avait jamais vu la mer suivi de La Montagne ou le dieu vivant	Celui qui n'avait jamais vu la mer translated into English as The Boy Who Had Never Seen the Sea. La Montagne ou le dieu vivant has not been translated into English	2002; ISBN 978-2-07-051394-9	2008; ISSN 0028-792X
Voyage au pays des arbres	-----------	2007; ISBN 978-2-07-053665-8	-----------

== Short stories ==
=== La Fièvre ===
Translated by Daphne Woodward in 1966 as "The Fever"

#	Original French	English translation	Pages
Introductory Letter	-	Introductory Letter (by Le Clezio)	
1	La fièvre	Fever	
2	Le jour où Beaumont fit connaissance avec sa douleur	The Day that Beaumont became Acquainted with his Pain	
3	me semble que le bateau se dirige vers lîle	It Seems to Me the Boat is Heading for the Island	
4	-	Backwards	
5	-	The Walking Man	
6	Martin	Martin	
7	-	The World is Alive	
8	-	Then I shall be able to Find Peace and Slumber	
9	-	A Day of Old Age	

=== Mondo et autres histoires ===
#	Original French	English translation	Pages
1	Mondo	-	
2	Lullaby	-	
3	La montagne du dieu vivant	-	
4	Celui qui n'avait jamais vu la mer	The Boy Who Had Never Seen the Sea	
5	Hazaran	-	
6	Martin	-	
7	Peuple du ciel	-	
8	Les bergers	-	

=== La ronde et autres faits divers ===
"La ronde et autres faits divers" was translated into English as "The Round & Other Cold Hard Facts" by C. Dickson.

#	Original French	English translation	Pages
1	La ronde	The Round	
2	Moloch	Moloch	
3	L'échappé	The Escapee	
4	Ariane	Ariadne	
5	Villa Aurore	Villa Aurore	
6	Le jeu d'Anne	Anne's Game	
7	La grande vie	The Great Life	
8	Le passeur	The Runner	
9	O voleur, voleur, quelle vie est la tienne?	O Thief What Is the Life You Lead?	
10	Orlamonde	Yondaland	
11	David	David	

=== Printemps et autres saisons ===
#	Original French	English translation	Pages
1	Printemps	-	
2	Fascination	-	
3	Le temps ne passe pas	-	
4	Zinna	-	
5	La saison des pluies	The Rainy Season	

=== Awaité Pawana ===
#	Original French	English translation	Pages
1	Awaité Pawana	Pawana	

=== La Fête chantée et autres essais de thème amérindien ===
#	Original French	English translation	Pages
1	La féte chantée	-	
2	Trois livres indiens	-	
3	La conquête divine du Michoacan	-	
4	De la féte à la guerre	-	
5	Le rêve d'or de l'Amérique indienne	-	
6	Les Chichimèques Indigénisme et révolution	-	
7	Mythes amérindiens et littérature	-	
8	La corne d'abondance	-	
9	Jacobo Daciano à Tarecuato	-	
10	Trois célébrations du Mexique	-	
11	Peuple des oiseaux	-	
12	Dzibilnocac, écrit de nuit	-	
13	La voix indienne: Rigoberta Menchú	-	
14	Toutes choses sont liées	-	
15	La danse contre le déluge.	-	

=== Cœur brûle et autres romances ===
#	Original French	English translation	Pages
1	Cœur brûle	No translation. Literally, "Heart burns (and other romances")	
2	Trois aventurières	Literally, "Three Adventuresses"	
3	Trésor	Literally, "Treasure"	
4	-	-	
5	-	-	
6	-	-	
7	-	-	

=== Tabataba suivi de pawana ===
#	Original French	English translation	Pages
1	Tabataba	-	
2	pawana	-	

== Essays ==
French title	French publication form	English translation	English publication form	French publication date	English publication date
Le Rêve mexicain ou la pensée interrompue	Book; ISBN 978-2-07-032680-8	The Mexican Dream, or, The Interrupted Thought of Amerindian Civilizations	Book; ISBN 978-0-226-11002-8.	1965	1993
Conversations avec J.M.G. Le Clézio	Journal Mercure de France; OCLC 498529	------------	------------	1971	------------
Haï	Book; ISBN 978-2-605-00112-5	------------	------------	1971	------------
Mydriase	Book; ISBN 978-2-85194-071-1	------------	------------	1973	------------
Vers les icebergs (Essai sur Henri Michaux)	Book; ISBN 978-2-85194-059-9	------------	------------	1978	------------
L'Inconnu sur la Terre	Book; ISBN 978-2-07-075488-5	------------	------------	1978	------------
Trois Villes saintes	Book; ISBN 978-2-07-021811-0	------------	------------	1980	------------
Dans la maison d'Edith	Journal and online publication OCLC 60619315	------------	------------	1997	------------
Sur Lautréamont	Book; ISBN 978-2-87027-216-9	------------	------------	1987	------------
Diego et Frida	Book; ISBN 978-2-234-02617-9	------------	------------	1993	------------
Ailleurs	Interview Jean-Louis Ezine with Le Clézio; ISBN 978-2-86959-244-5	------------	------------	1995	------------
Enfances	Introduction to Enfances: photographies de Christophe Kuhn; ISBN 2-9510433-1-7	------------	------------	1998-06-26	------------
Le Llano en flammes	Preface to French edition of El Llano en Llamas originally written in Spanish by Juan Rulfo; ISBN 978-0-292-70132-8	------------	------------	2003-11-20	------------
L'Extase matérielle	Book; ISBN 978-2-07-023824-8	------------	------------	1967	------------
L'Africain	Autobiographical essay published as a book ISBN 978-2-7152-2470-4	------------	------------	2004	------------
Une lettre de J.M.G. Le Clezio	Journal (Revue des Deux Mondes) and online publication ISSN 0750-9278	------------	------------	1982	------------
Ballaciner	Book; ISBN 2-07-078484-3	------------	------------	2007	------------
La liberté pour Rêver and La liberté pour parler	------------	Freedom to Dream and Freedom to Speak	Journal and online publication	------------	1997
Sur la lecture comme le vrai voyage	------------	On reading as true travel ISSN 0196-3570	Journal and online publication	------------	1965
Dans la forêt des paradoxes	Online publication	In the forest of paradoxes	Online publication	2008-12-07	2008-12-07
?	------------	In the Eye of the Sun: Mexican Fiestas	Preface to In the Eye of the Sun: Mexican Fiestas entitled "Three Indian Celebrations"; ISBN 978-0-393-31584-4	------------	1996-11-01

== Travel diaries ==
Title in French	Publication Form in French	Date of French Publication	Storyline
Voyage à Rodrigues	BOOK (135 pages); ISBN 978-2-07-070382-1	1986	Tells of how family feuds were resolved by recalling the adventure stories his grandfather told in a journey from Mauritius to Rodrigues.
Gens des nuages	BOOK ( 151 pages); ISBN 978-2-07-041216-7	1997	Gens des nuages could be translated as meaning The Cloud People.Jémia is Le Clézio's wife and a Moroccan .Her ancestors were nomad who lived in the desert area. After her grand mother left her country, she never visited the Sahara before the trip. Photographs by Bruno Barbey.
Raga. Approche du continent invisible	BOOK (135 pages); ISBN 978-2-02-089909-3	2006	Travels in the archipelago of Vanuatu (in particular the islands of Port Vila, Ambrym, and Espiritu Santo ).These diaries of journeys in the Pacific offer a glimpse into a way of life which is threatened by globalisation, as well as meditations on the vastness of the sea, in the "continent" which the first visitors did not recognise as a cultural and geographic unity.

=== Voyage à Rodrigues ===
Le Clézio, J. M. G. "Voyage a Rodrigues". Le Nouveau Magazine Littéraire. Paris: MAGAZINE LITTERAIRE, no. 459, (2006): 83-85. ISSN 0024-9807.

=== Raga. Approche du continent invisible ===
Le Clézio, J. M. G. (2006). Raga: approche du continent invisible (in French). Paris: Seuil (Series:Peuples de l'eau). p. 135. ISBN 978-2-02-089909-3.

== Collection translations ==
=== Les Prophéties du Chilam Balam ===
==== Translated by the Author into French ====
Title	Year	Publisher	Length	Notes
"Les Prophéties du Chilam Balam"	1976	Gallimard, Le Chemin, Paris; ISBN 978-0-320-07041-9	201 pages	Mayas--Histoire; Mayas--Religion et mythologie; Indiens--Mexique--Religion et mythologie; Prophéties; Mayas--History; Mayas--Religion and mythology; Indians of Mexico--Religion and mythology; Prophecies
"Le Clézio is an expert on early Amerindian mythology and culture and produced a translation of Maya mythology into a French in Les prophéties du Chilam Balam" The Mayan Chilam Balam books are usually collections of disparate texts in which Mayan and Spanish traditions have coalesced and are in the Yucatec Maya language (in European script). Le Clezio ... is a speaker of at least a half-dozen languages, three of which are pre-Columbian, including Maya, which he learned while living in a Yucatecan village during the 1970s. When asked about his devotion to native cultures, Le Clezio replied The dawn of peoples is important because we seem now to be living in the dusk. You have the sense that we are getting near the end "Le Chilam Balam" is a collection of songs, prophecies and calendars kept through oral tradition. These books contain the observations, calendars and prophecies of the seer or magician named Balam, and they are named after their place of origin.

=== Relation de Michoacan ===
Translation of "Relación de Michoacan" from medieval Spanish into French. This codex, copied in the years 1539–1540, contains the narration of a Franciscan friar, whom the American historian Dr. Benedict Warren identified as Fray Gerónimo de Alcalá.

=== Sirandanes ===
==== Translated by the Author into French ====
Title	Year	Publisher	Length	Notes
"Sirandanes"	1988	Seghers, Paris; ISBN 2-232-10327-7	93 pages	co-translated by his wife Jémia .
Includes a glossary entitled"Petit lexique de la langue créole et des oiseaux" meaning this glossagy is a small lexicon of a creole language and a guide to birds.
