= Villa Aurora (disambiguation) =

Villa Aurora is a building in Los Angeles, California.

Villa Aurora may also refer to:

- Casino di Villa Boncompagni Ludovisi, also known as Villa Aurora, a building in Rome
- Villa Aurora (Cintano), a villa in Cintano, Italy

== See also ==
- Vila Aurora, a train station in São Paulo
- Villa Aurore, a novel by J. M. G. Le Clézio
