= Enfances (essay) =

- Author: J. M. G. Le Clézio; Brigitte Fossey; Christophe Kuhn
- Original title: Enfances
- Language: French
- Genre: Essay
- Published: June 26, 1998, Enfants réfugiés du monde
- Publication place: France
- Pages: 48 pp
- ISBN: 978-2-9510433-1-2
- OCLC: 53254439

"Enfances" is an essay written by French Nobel laureate J. M. G. Le Clézio for a book of the same name which was co-written by Brigitte Fossey and set to photographs by Christophe Kuhn.

== Purpose ==
The essay in "Enfances" was written by Le Clézio to contribute to this book of photographs.

== French ==
It was originally published in French in 2003 and there is no English translation published to date.

== Photography and neorealism ==
Le Clézio has written about the impact of visual representation in media such as cinema and photography. Le Clézio has written texts for numerous books of photographs as well as "Enfances".

- In the Eye of the Sun:Mexican Fiestas
- Les Prophéties du Chilam Balam
- Le Rêve mexicain ou la pensée interrompue
- Relation de Michoacan (1984: Accounts of the Michoalan)

== Publication history ==
- 1998, France, Enfants réfugiés du monde
