= Enfances =

Enfances may refer to:

- Enfances (essay), 1998 essay
- Enfances (film), 2008 French film
