= Winningham =

Winningham is a surname. Notable people with the surname include:

- Geoff Winningham (born 1943), American photographer
- Herm Winningham (born 1961), American former professional baseball player
- Mare Winningham (born 1959), American actress and singer-songwriter
- Sam Winningham (1926–2024), American football coach and player
