= Ailleurs =

- First edition
- Author: J. M. G. Le Clézio
- Original title: Ailleurs
- Language: French
- Genre: Essay interview
- Publisher: Arléa: Diffusion Le Seuil, Paris
- Publication date: 1995
- Publication place: France
- Pages: 124
- ISBN: 978-2-86959-244-5
- OCLC: 33270374
- Dewey Decimal: 843/.914 B 20
- LC Class: PQ2672.E25 Z4623 1995

Ailleurs are the transcripts of a series of interviews between Jean-Louis Ezine and the French Nobel laureate J. M. G. Le Clézio.

== Short summary ==
Ailleurs (French for "Elsewhere") reads like a meandering conversation where Le Clézio gets to talk about his childhood, his dreams, where he prefers to do his writing as well as aviation and how he escapes from the everyday. Some of the themes expanded in these interviews are:

- The gold-digger who was Le Clézio's grandfather.
- His English-speaking father.
- Milly-la-Forêt (the village where his mother was born).
- Why he was that kind of a child who would prefer to stay in a cabin somewhere off of the coast of Africa to write.
- He was also a teenager who believed his destiny was to be found in comic strips.
- Why Le Clézio was a (human) being not like other beings; how he was preoccupied with meditation and (day)dreaming.
- Le Clézio claiming never to have been either a cheap nor a false populist.
- Le Clézio on bearing no resentment or any desire to get revenge.

According to the publisher, the interviews lead to a book which is " an opus on thinking and on poetry" and which uses "broad strokes using mythological colors to tell his story". The storyline of this book is definitely what the French call " Ailleurs" meaning somewhere else.

== Broadcast ==
This book includes interviews previously broadcast on France Culture in 1988 as part of a radio-programme "A voix nue".
