= Jacques Nicolas Bellavène =

Jacques Nicolas Bellavène (20 October 1770, in Verdun – 8 February 1826, in Milly) was a French general. His name is engraved on the east side of the Arc de Triomphe.

== Life ==
He entered the French army as a private in the 2nd Cavalry Regiment on 24 March 1791, rising to sous-lieutenant on 10 May 1792 and ordnance officer for his regiment on the staff of the armée du Rhin. On 19 May 1793 he was made an aide de camp, took 7 boxes from the enemy and captured the colonel Johann von Klenau. He was attached to the general staff on 29 vendémiaire year II.

On the night of 12-13 frimaire, having learned on a visit to the vanguard that the Austrian army defeated at Niederbronn was evacuating Haguenau, he marched on Haguenau with 50 dragoons, surprised the sentries guarding the gate, entered the city, stopped the enemy from looting it and took 400 prisoners. In recognition of that action he was made chief adjutant general of the battalion on the following 23 germinal. On 4 prairial, with two squadrons of chasseurs, he was commanded to capture the positions at Neunhoffen, then held by 1,500 Bavarians—he forced them to retire and took 200 prisoners. Promoted to adjudant-général colonel provisoire on 3 messidor the same year, he went to join the siege of Mainz where, on the night of 25-26 brumaire year III, he captured 600 men of the corps known as the Manteaux-Rouges, who were at Weisenau—this post was re-occupied on 26 brumaire and Bellavène surprised it the following night and captured 400 men. He was then confirmed as adjudant-général colonel on 25 prairial year III before taking part in the commission set up by general Moreau to plan a crossing of the Rhine. In prairial year IV this plan was presented to the general, who approved it, and it took place on 6 messidor. The same day Moreau, the commander-in-chief, made Bellavène a général de brigade.

At the battle of Rastadt on 17 messidor, general Sainte-Suzanne's division found itself compromised. Bellavène went to support it with his demi-brigade of cavalry and was struck by a cannonball which took off a leg and knocked over his horse. On 22 messidor the French government confirmed his provisional promotion to général de brigade. He was then employed in the government's mapping office and on 5 pluviôse year V was given a command in the 3rd Military Division, which he held until 1 germinal year VII. He was made inspector of reviews on 8 pluviôse year VIII before being recalled to command the 4th Military Division during the congress of Lunéville.

On 19 ventôse year XI, Bonaparte entrusted him with the command, organisation and direction of studies at the military academy at Saint-Cyr, as inspector of the Prytanée militaire; he then made him, in year XII, a member of the Légion d'honneur on 19 frimaire and a Commander of the order on 25 prairial. He was then made a général de division on 4 October 1807, a baron de l'Empire in 1808 and inspector-general of military schools on 1 July 1812. On 8 July 1814 the restored king made him a Cross of the Order of Saint Louis, but on 2 August that year he was dismissed as inspector-general and on 1 January 1815 put on half pay. He was made inspector-general again by Napoleon during the Hundred Days and gave the government 4,000 francs to spend on equipment for the National Guard. The Dictionnaire des Généraux français relates of him:

When allied troops arrived in the outskirts of Paris, an officer and six Prussian soldiers were encamped at Saint-Cyr; soon a large force of allied troops gathered outside this establishment, demanding that the Prussians be handed over to them, and also desiring that they lay down their arms and hand over the students as prisoners. General Bellavène, after having put the seven foreigners in a place of safety, appeared alone before the allied troops and declared to them that, since the arms belonged to the ministry, the students to their parents and his guests to his honour, he was resolved to hand over neither one nor the others. This firmness impressed the allied troops, who gave up their plan.

Louis XVIII, now back in Paris, allowed Bellavène to retire to Milly-la-Forêt on 27 September 1815, where Bellavène died in 1826.

== Coat of arms ==
Coupé : au 1, parti d'argent, à trois étoiles d'azur et du quartier des Barons militaires de l'Empire; au 2, d'azur, au chevron d'or, acc. en pointe d'une cuirasse d'argent, frangée de gueules. or Écartelé : au 1, d'or à trois étoiles d'azur 1 et 2; au 2, des Barons militaires de l'Empire; au 3, d'azur à la cuirasse en fasce d'argent, au 4, d'argent à la lampe antique soutenue d'un cippe, le tout de sable, la lampe allumée de gueules.
