= Daregal =

Darégal S.A.
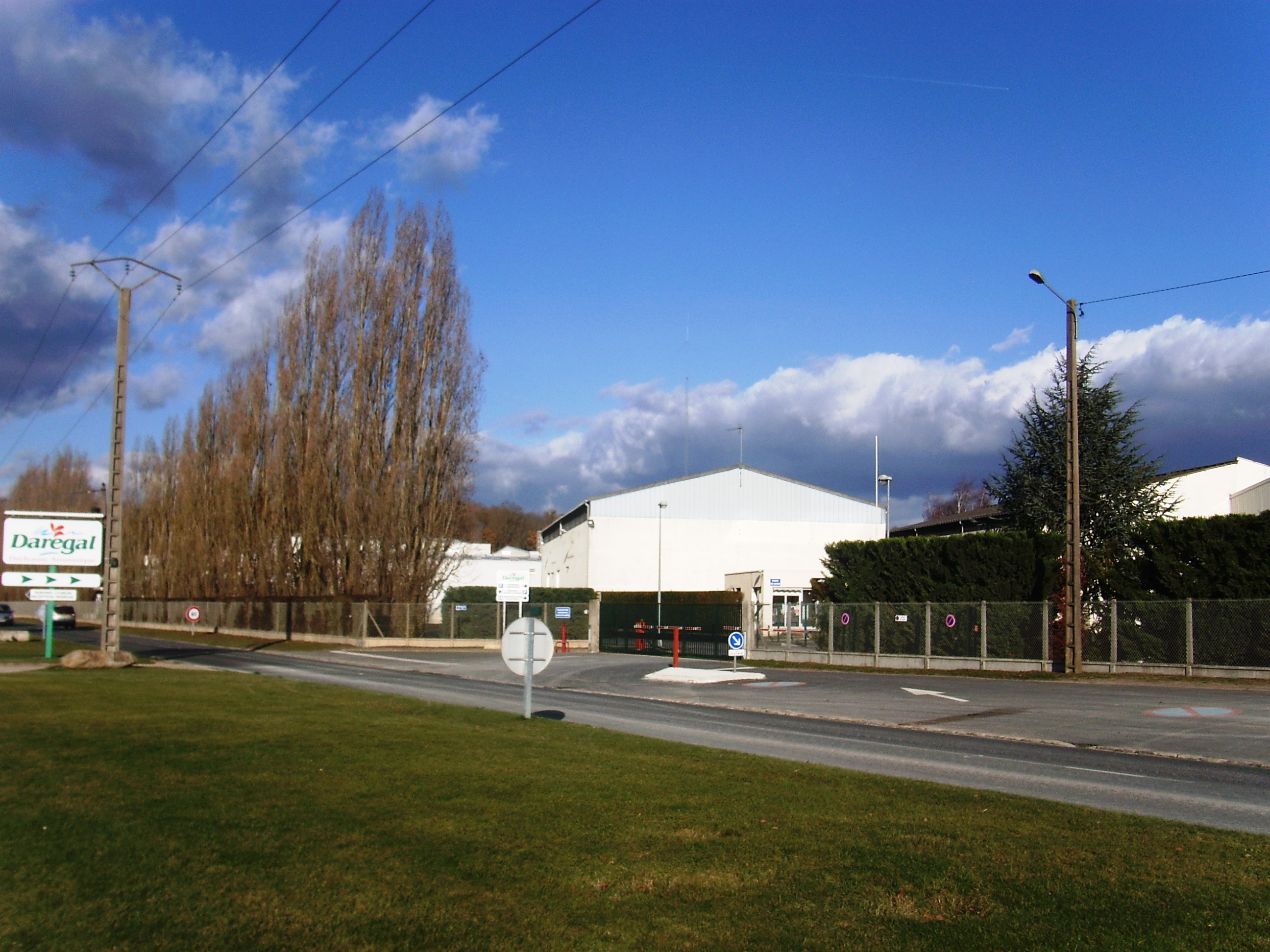
- Factory in Milly-la-Forêt, France
- Type: S.A.
- Industry: Food processing
- Founded: 1887
- Headquarters: Milly-la-Forêt
- Key people: Luc DARBONNE
- Products: frozen food
- Website: www.daregal.fr

DARÉGAL is a French company producing culinary herbs. In 1887 Amand Darbonne founded the bases for DARÉGAL in Milly-la-Forêt. This forerunner capitalized on the region's know-how, setting out to cultivate medicinal plants.

== History ==
- 1887: Amand Darbonne set up in Milly-la-Forêt (France) to cultivate medicinal plants.
- 1899: The first industrial open-air dryer was built for medicinal plants and infusions.
- 1920: André Darbonne, 2nd generation, created the medicinal plant trade association in France.
- 1954: Marc Darbonne, 3rd generation, launched dehydrated aromatic plants.
- 1966: The largest continuous dehydration oven of the time was built.
- 1976: Luc Darbonne, 4th generation, created IQF Frozen Aromatic Herbs.
- 1993: A production unit was opened in Turlock, California: SUPHERB FARMS.
- 2001: Gyma's frozen seasonings business was acquired.
- 2009: A production unit was opened in Santaella, Spain.

== Technology ==
- INDIVIDUALLY QUICK FROZEN HERBS
- INDIVIDUALLY QUICK FROZEN ORGANIC HERBS
- DEHYDRATED HERBS
- BITEMPERATURE AROMATIC HERBS
- PUMPABLE AROMATIC HERBS
- NATURAL EXTRACTS
- FROZEN HERB PASTES
- FRESH DRY PLUS (FD+)

== Certifications ==
- ISO 9001 - 2000
- IFS - version 5
- BRC - version 5
- Marks & Spencer Field to Fork
- Biological Production
- Kosher
