= Villa Aurora (Cintano) =

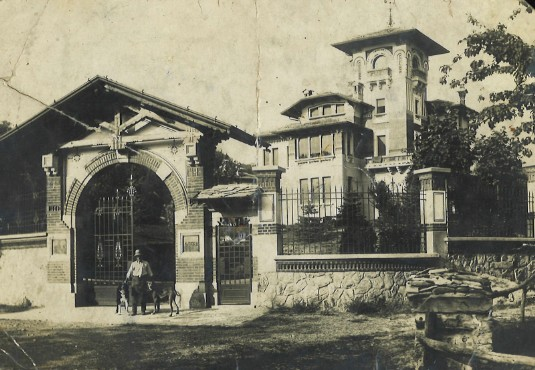
- Vintage view
- Click on the map for a fullscreen view

General information
- Location: Cintano, Italy
- Coordinates: 45°25′37.65″N 7°41′14.7″E

Villa Aurora, also known as Villa Chiuminatto, is a historic eclectic villa located in Cintano, Piedmont, Italy.

== History ==
The villa was commissioned as a private residence by Giacomo Chiuminatto (1884–1951), a local construction contractor who was also involved in the construction of railway infrastructure in Calabria during the 1920s. During the First World War, he was awarded the title of Commendatore.

== Description ==
Set within extensive grounds, the villa is an eclectic-style building with a fundamentally square floor plan. Its façades are distinguished by numerous elaborately decorated windows, while the main roof is a hipped roof clad in lose stone slabs. Rising above the upper floors is a panoramic tower, which interrupts the roofline and provides views over the surrounding landscape. The tower is open on all sides by means of arches and is topped by a hipped roof. Some of the villa's decorative features symbolically evoke Chiuminatto's profession in the building trade through representations of construction tools.

The property also includes two secondary buildings adjacent to the road, separate from the main volume of the villa. The estate is enclosed by a stone wall incorporating decorative brickwork. The entrances from the road are marked by round-arched gateways, sheltered by projecting roofs supported by timber trusses and clad in lose stone slabs. The secondary buildings, which also feature hipped roofs, are decorated with brickwork on their façades and along the cornice.
