= Conservatoire National des Plantes à Parfum, Médicinales, Aromatiques et Industrielles =

Nonprofit botanical garden in Île-de-France, France

Coordinates: 48°23′49″N 2°28′45″E

The Conservatoire National des Plantes à Parfum, Médicinales, Aromatiques et Industrielles (4 hectares), formerly known as the Conservatoire National des Plantes Médicinales Aromatiques et Industrielles (CNPMAI), is a nonprofit botanical garden located on the Route de Nemours, Milly-la-Forêt, Essonne, Île-de-France, France. It is open daily in the warmer months; an admission fee is charged.

The conservatory was established in 1987 by the Plantes Aromatiques et Médicinales (PAM) professional society to preserve medicinal, aromatic, and industrial plants. In 1994 it revised its name and mission to add perfume-related plants, and opened to the public in 2002. Today the garden contains more than 1200 species planted in two greenhouses (950 m² and 290 m²) and a variety of gardens including a study garden (40 plots), thematic garden, and an arboretum.

Some of the species shown at the conservatory:

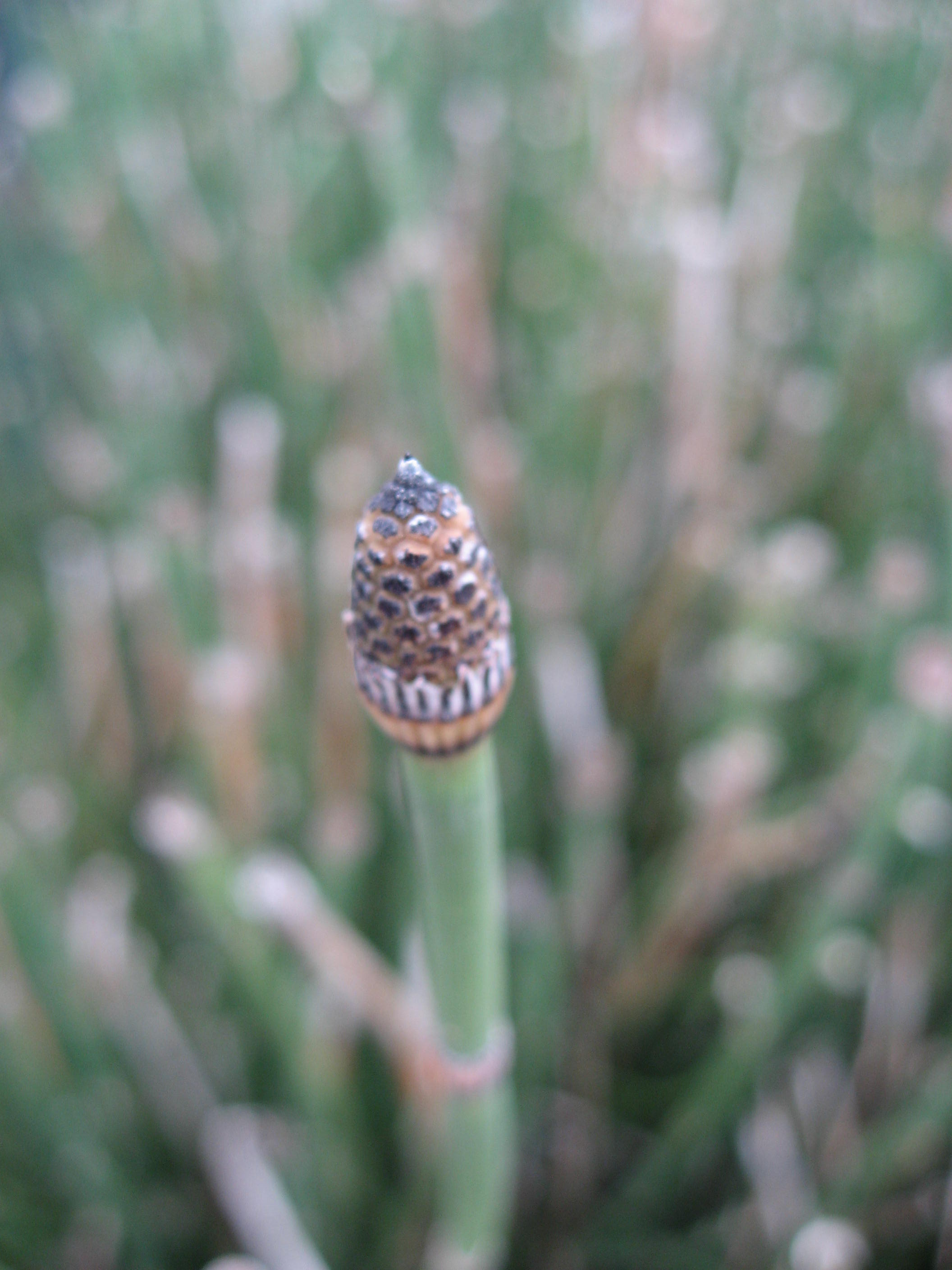
(Equisetum hyemale)

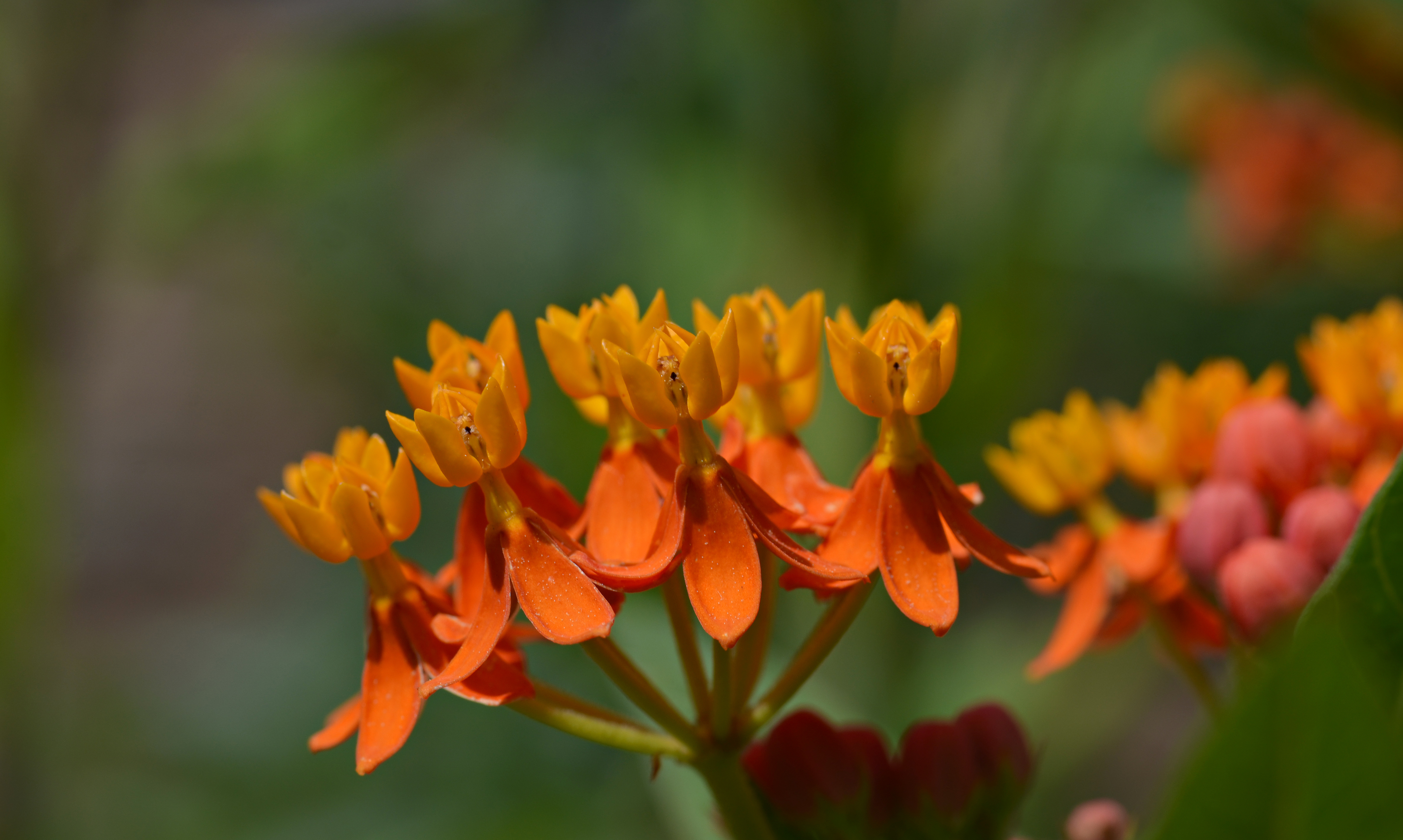
(Asclepias tuberosas)

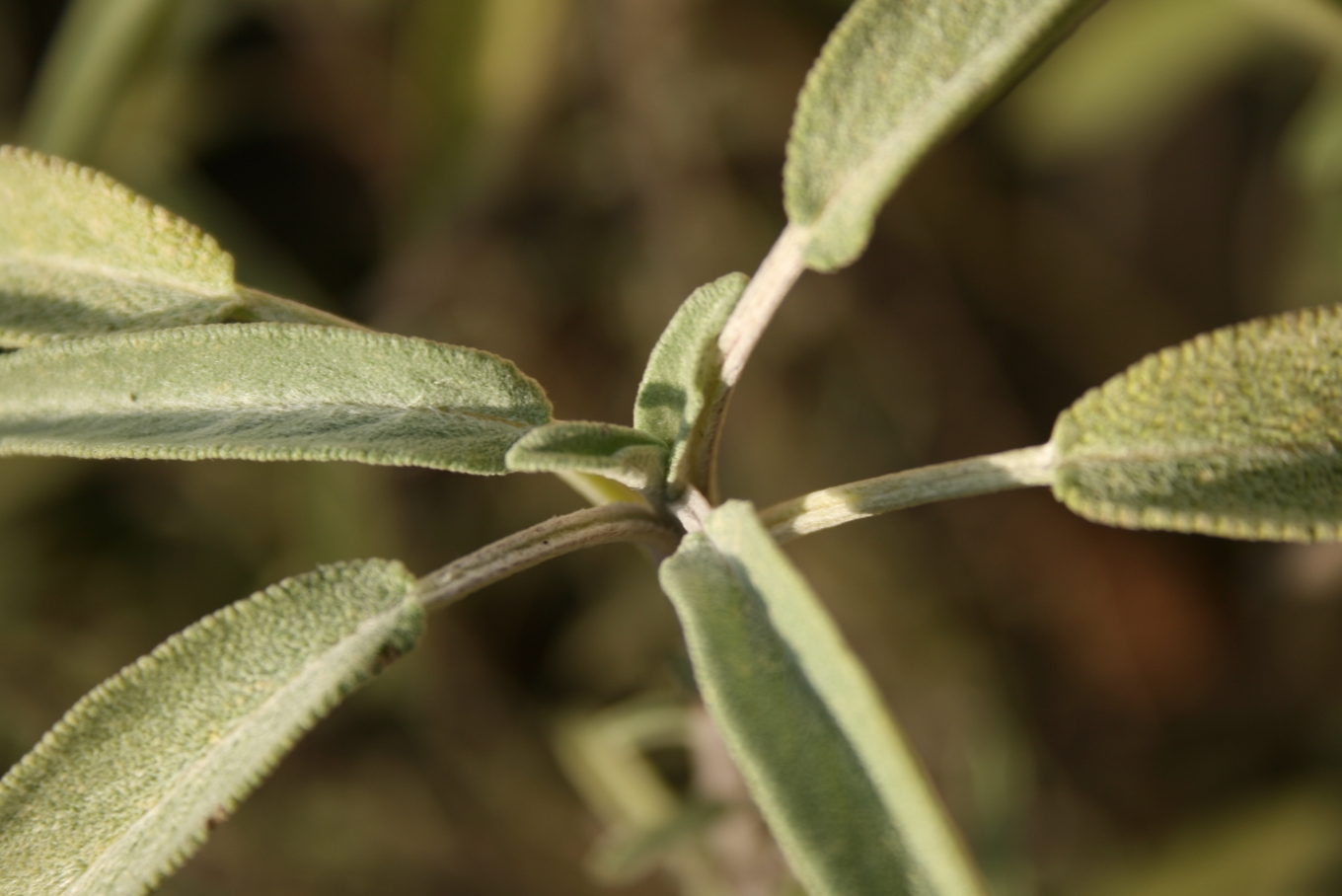
(Salvia officinalis)

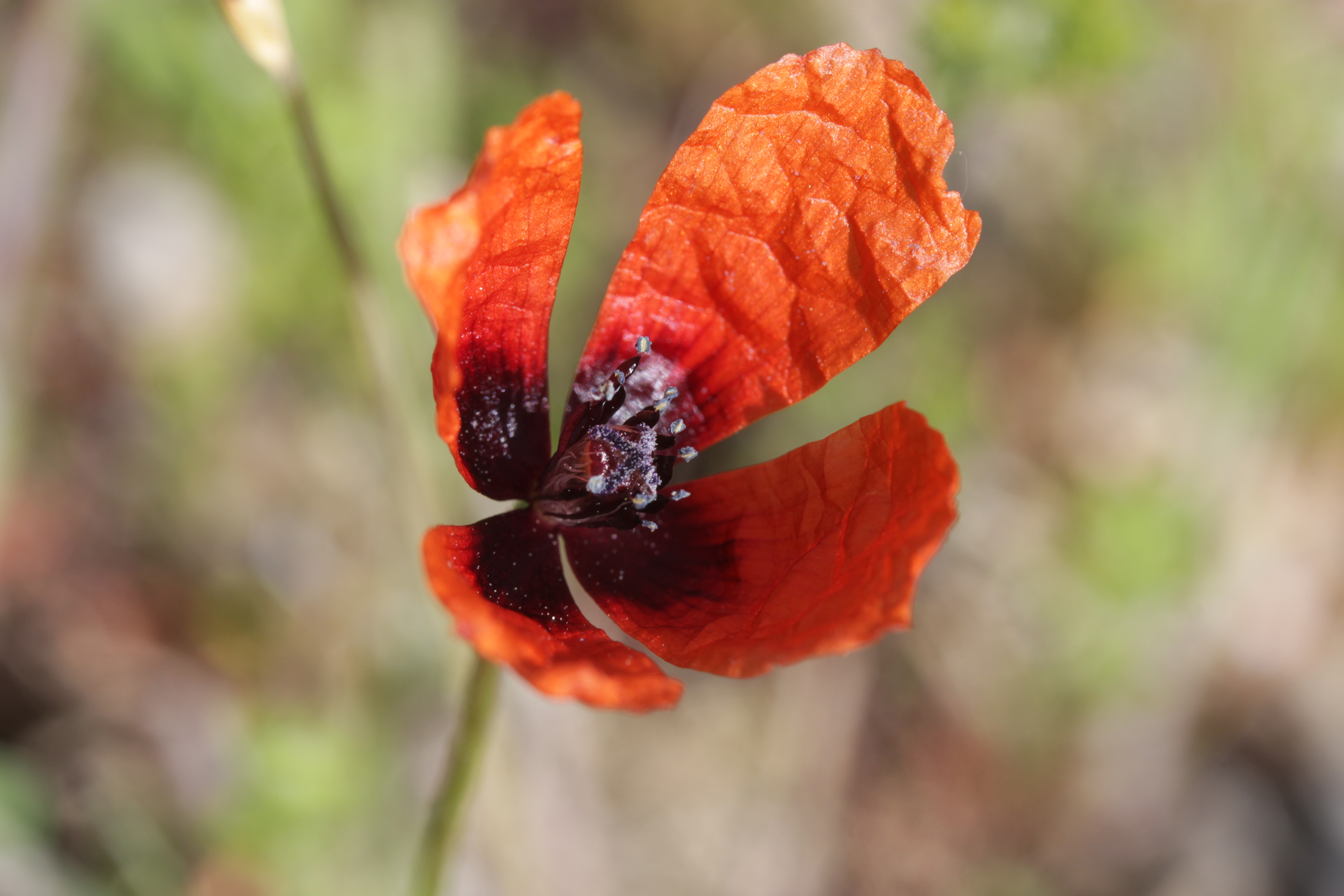
(Papaver argemone)

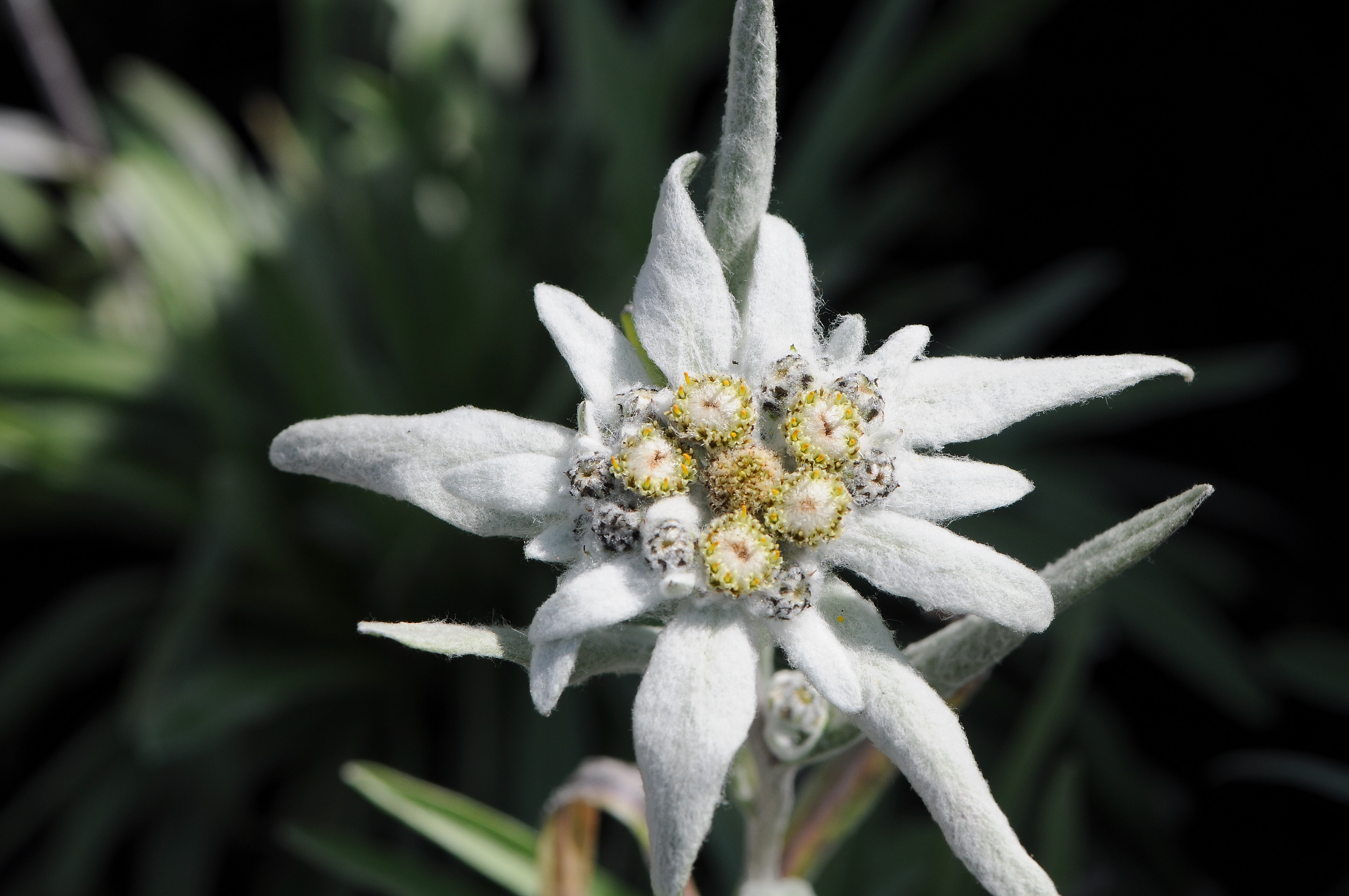
(Leontopodium alpinum)
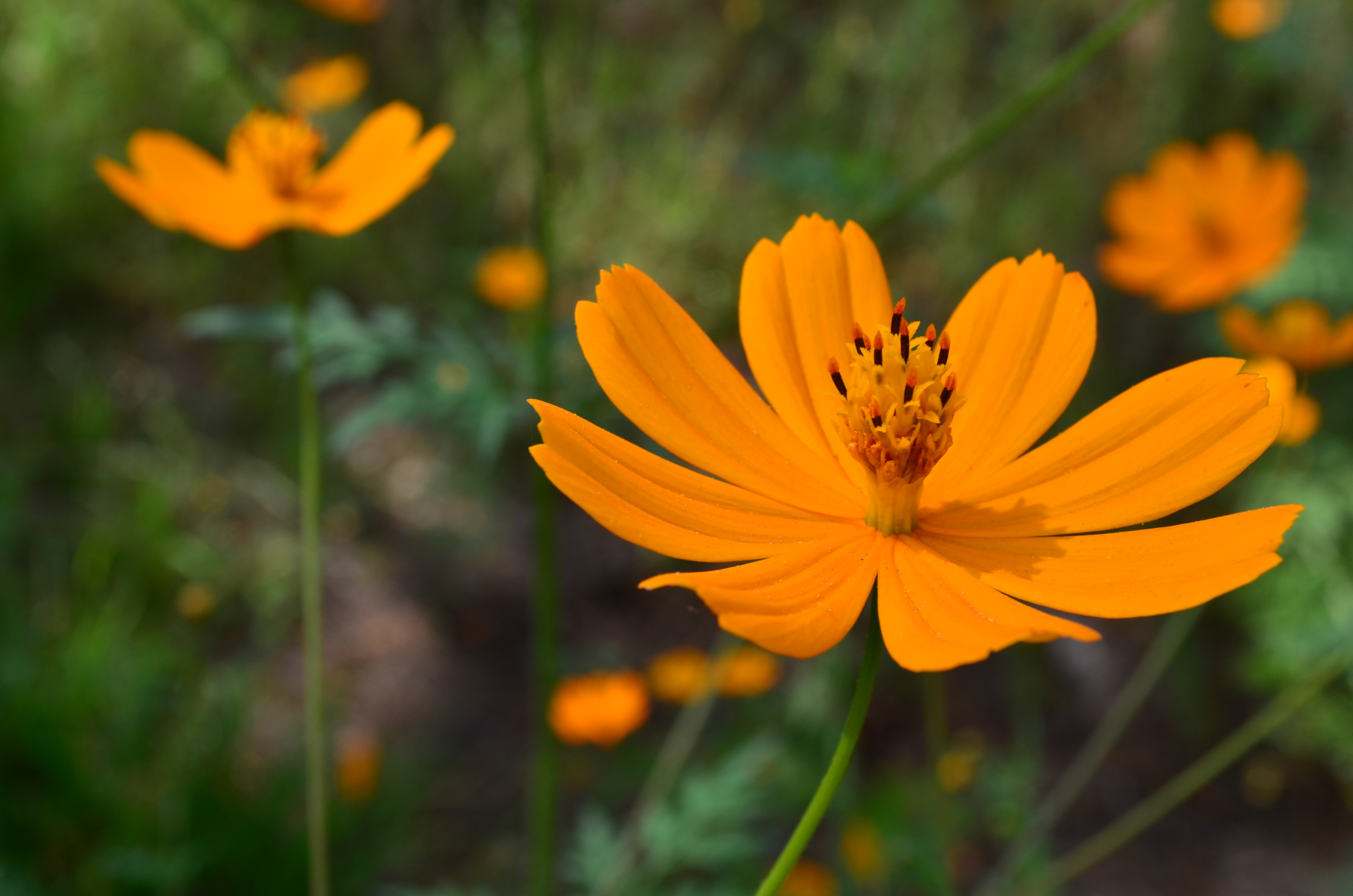
(Cosmos sulfureus)

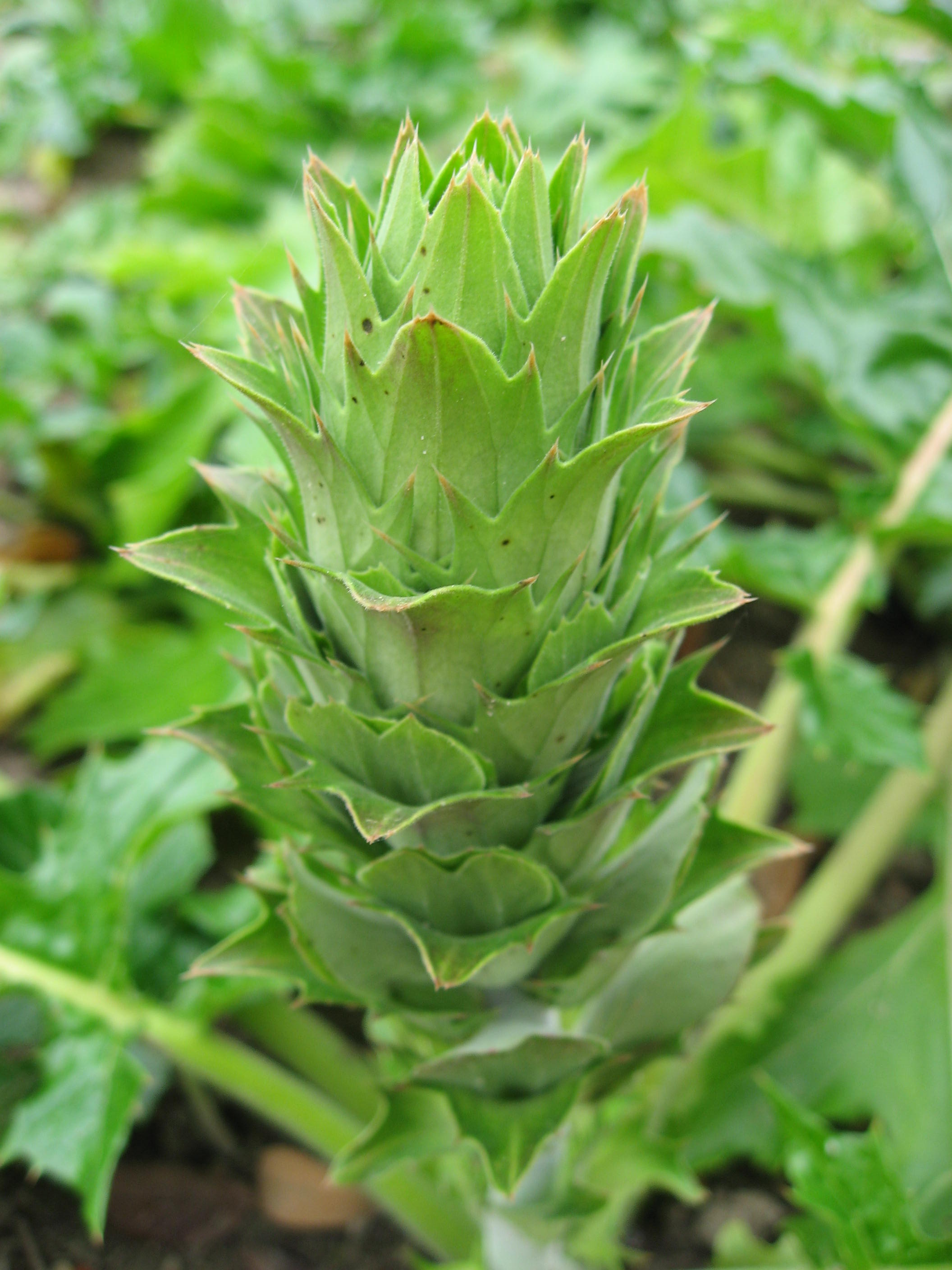
(Acanthus mollis)

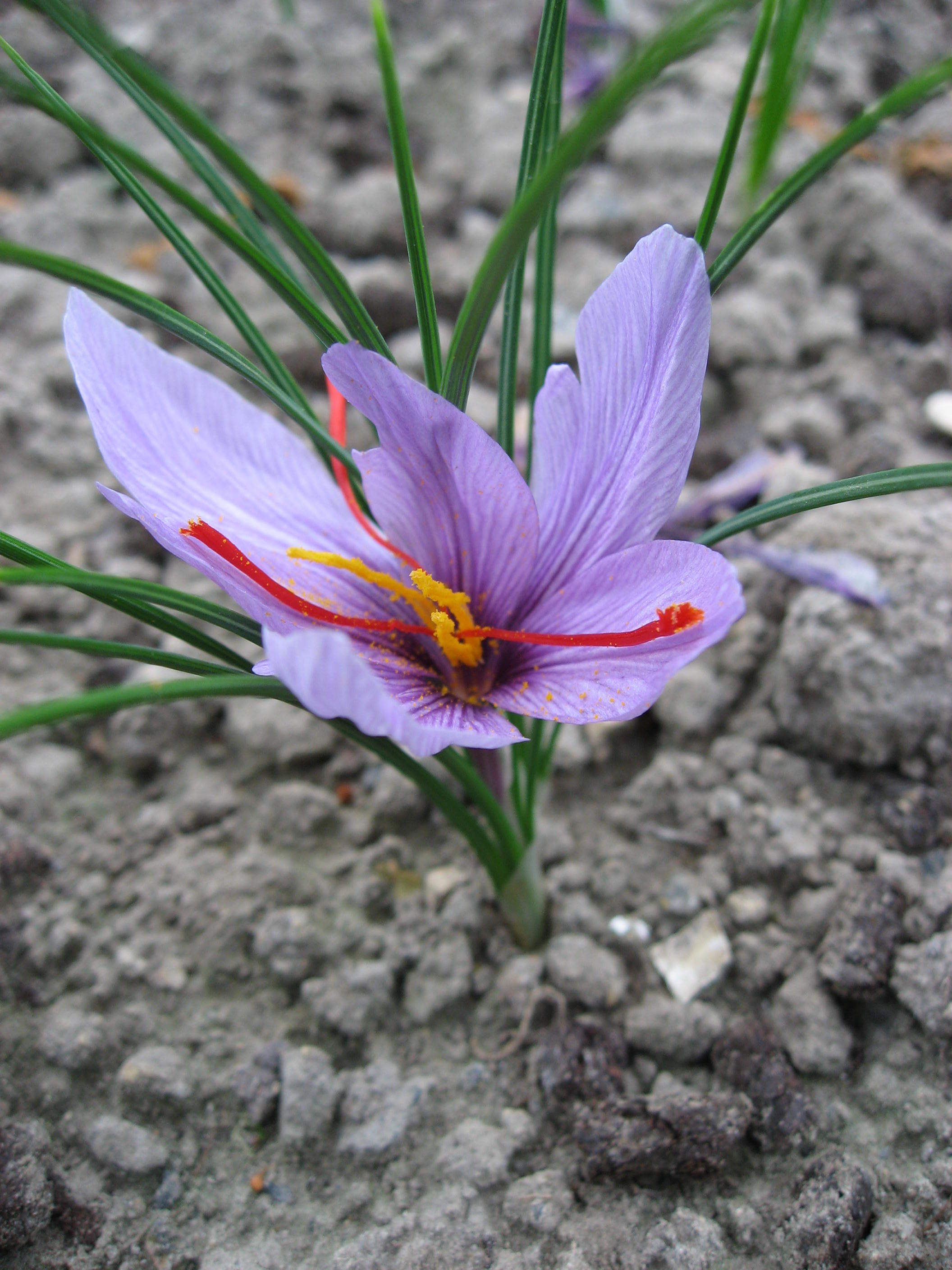
(Crocus sativus)

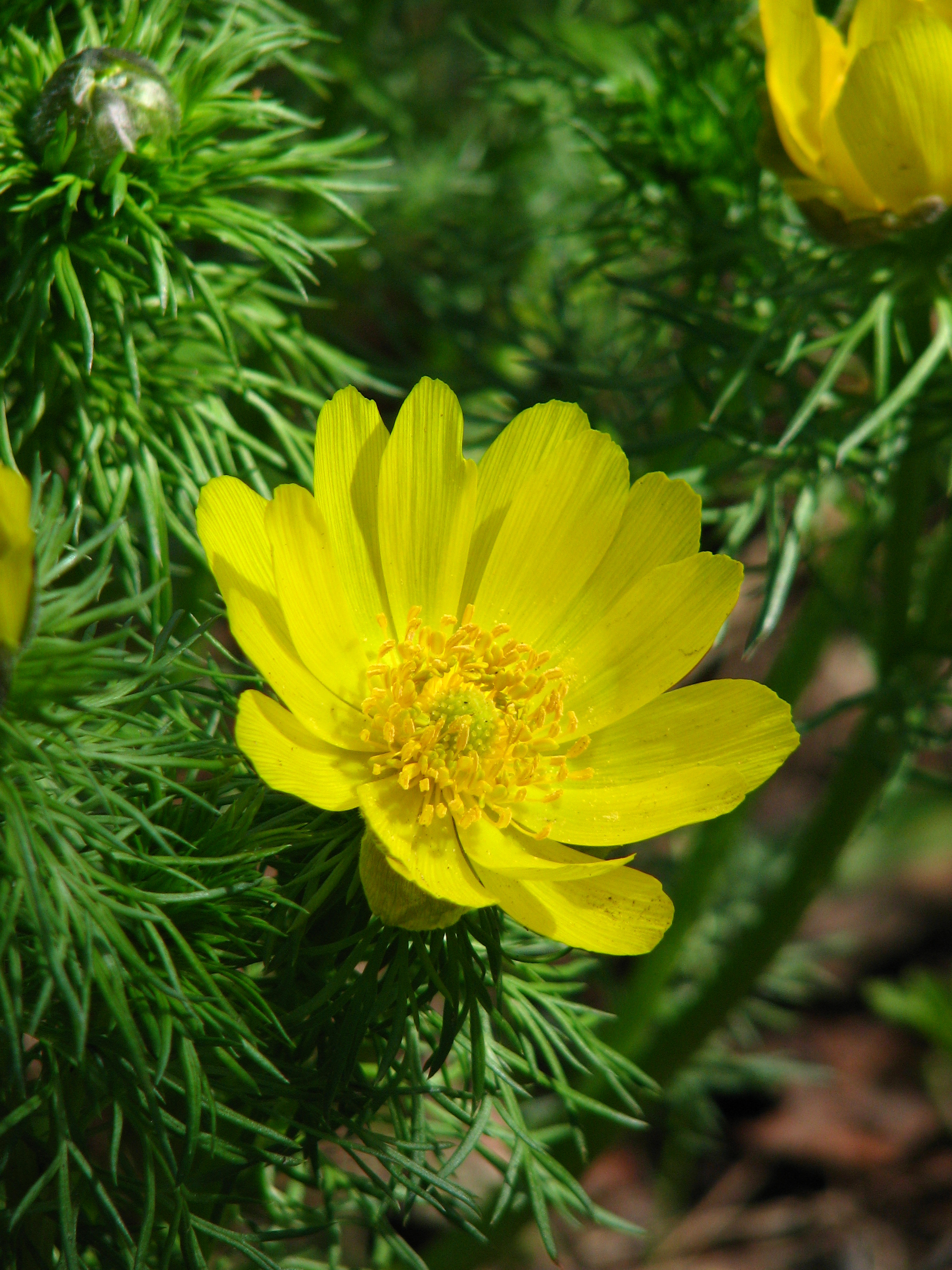
(Adonis vernalis)

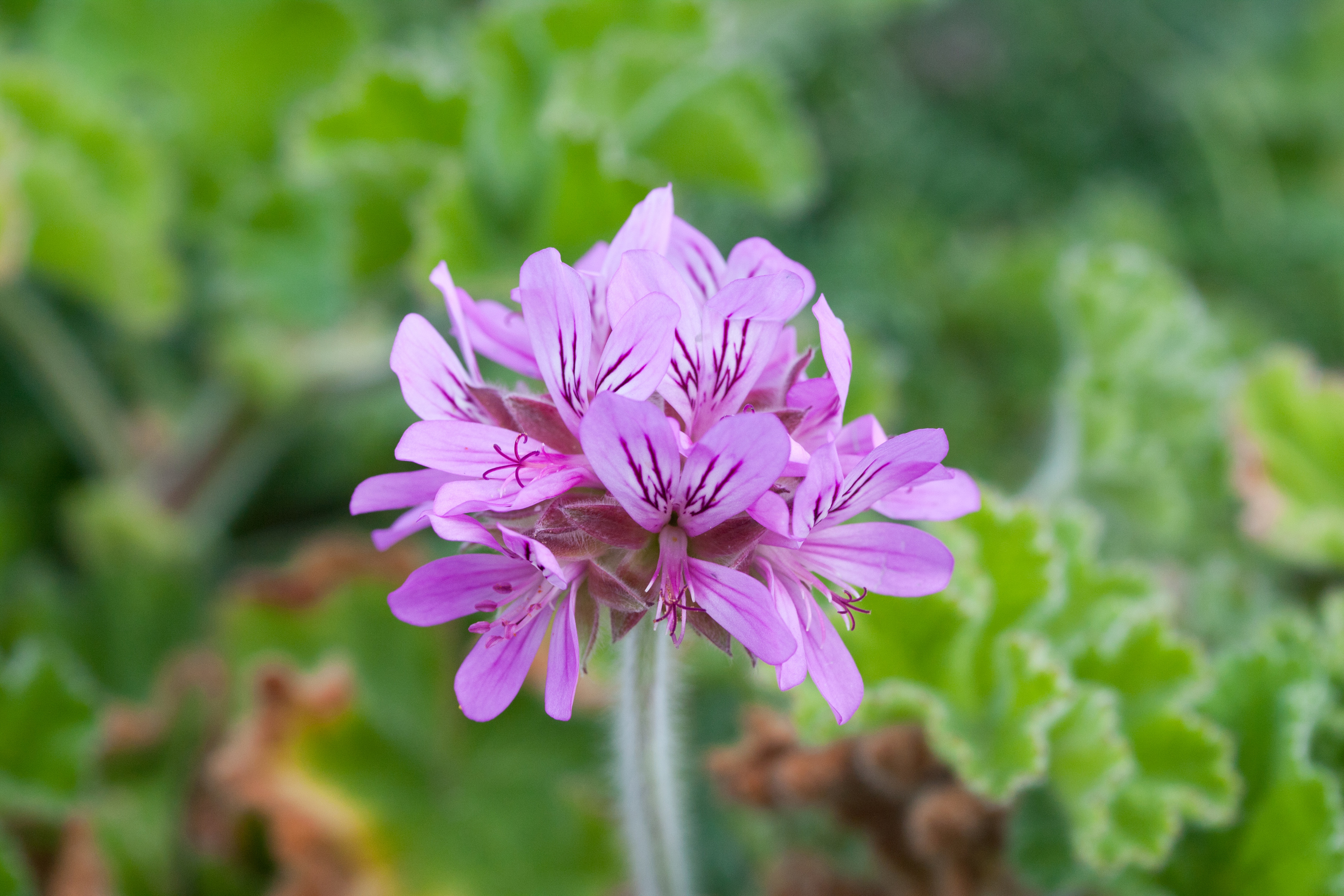
(Pelargonium capitatum)

== See also ==
- List of botanical gardens in France
