= Milly-la-Forêt =

Commune in Île-de-France, France

- Commune
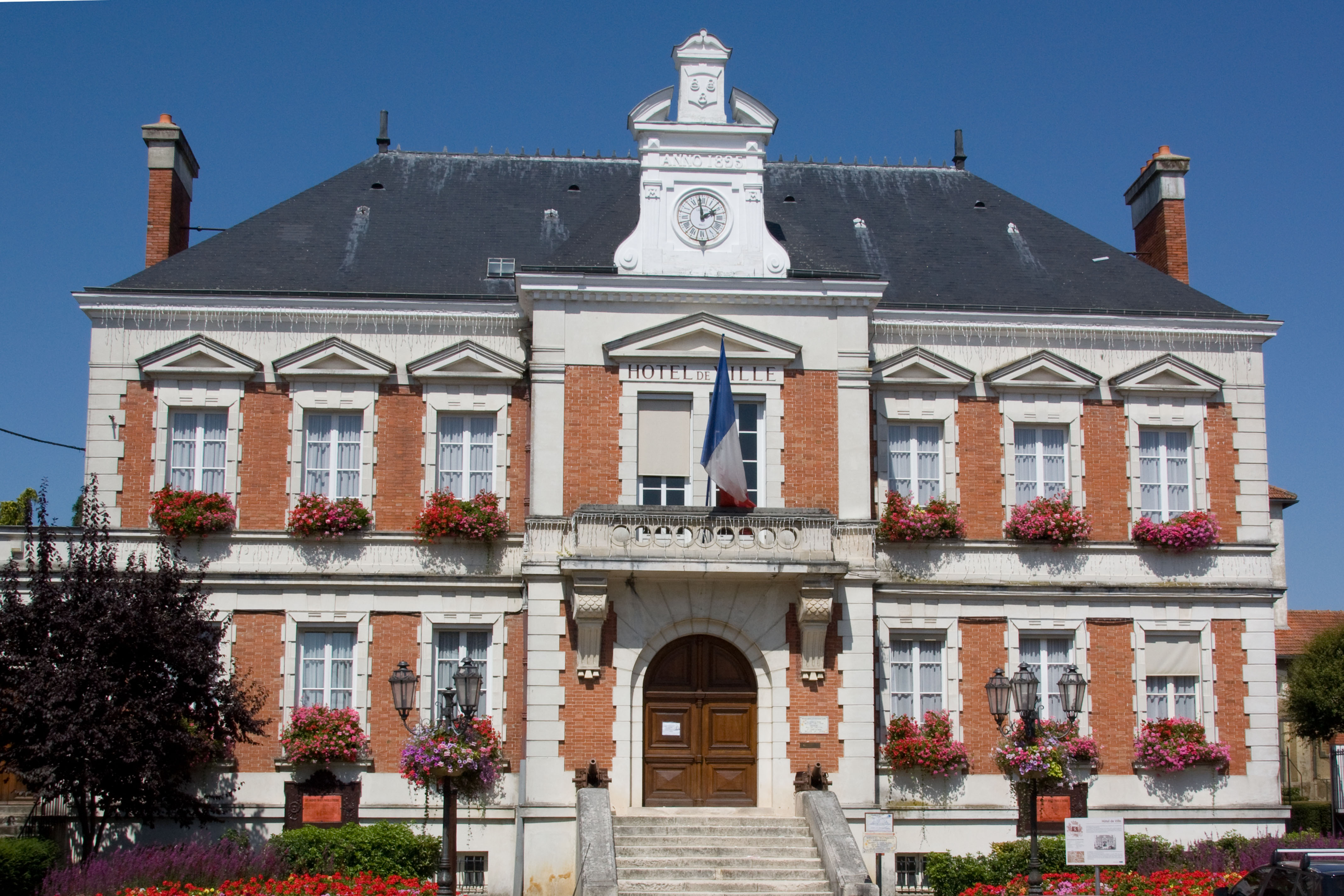
- The town hall in Milly-la-Forêt

- Coat of arms
- Location of Milly-la-Forêt
- Location within France Location within Île-de-France (region)
- Coordinates: 48°24′18″N 2°28′04″E
- Country: France
- Region: Île-de-France
- Department: Essonne
- Arrondissement: Évry
- Canton: Mennecy
- Intercommunality: CC des 2 Vallées

Government
  - Mayor (2024–2026): Bernard Bouley
- Area^{1}: 33.80 km^{2} (13.05 sq mi)
- Highest elevation: 135 m (443 ft)
- Lowest elevation: 60 m (200 ft)
- Population (2023): 4,562
  - Density: 135.0/km^{2} (349.6/sq mi)
- Demonym: Milliacois
- Time zone: UTC+01:00 (CET)
  - Summer (DST): UTC+02:00 (CEST)
- INSEE/Postal code: 91405 /91490
- Website: www.milly-la-foret.fr
- ^{1} French Land Register data, which excludes lakes, ponds, glaciers > 1 km^{2} (0.386 sq mi or 247 acres) and river estuaries.

Milly-la-Forêt (French pronunciation: [miji la fɔʁɛ]; lit. 'Milly-the-Forest') is a commune in the Essonne department in the Île-de-France region in northern France. A former Gaul village, its history can be traced back to before Christ. It is on the departmental border with Seine-et-Marne.

== Geology ==
The Forest of Fontainebleau, in the western end of which Milly-la-Forêt lies, is composed of the Oligocene Fontainebleau sands, which are a marine deposit, laid down in an intertidal zone.

== History ==
Milly-la-Forêt is the probable birthplace of Wulfram of Sens, Saint Wulfram; in about 640.

== Name origin ==
The first name of this domaine was Maurillac in Gaul, Mauriliaco on a Merovingien coin, became Maureliacum, Melliacum in 667, Milliacum in Latin. The place name Milly is relatively current; it refers to an antic presence of a villa rustica owned during the Gallo-Romaine era by a certain Milius or Emilius. Hereby, the name was imported in 1080 by the knight Adam de Milly, originally from Milly-en-Beauvaisis and first lord of the place. But a charter dated from 651 mentioned already the name Melliacus. In the 13th century more accuracy was added to the place, Miliacum in Gastineto in 1267, which gave the name Milly-en-Gâtinais without being official. Upon a request from the municipal council and by a statutory order from 6 February 1948, the name was replaced by Milly-la-Forêt, considered at that time as the most touristic place and to differentiate it from its homonym Milly in Normandy.

== Population ==
Historical population
Year	Pop.	±% p.a.
1968	3,180	—
1975	3,492	+1.35%
1982	3,795	+1.20%
1990	4,307	+1.59%
1999	4,601	+0.74%
2007	4,746	+0.39%
2012	4,788	+0.18%
2017	4,609	−0.76%
2023	4,562	−0.17%
Source: INSEE

== The village ==
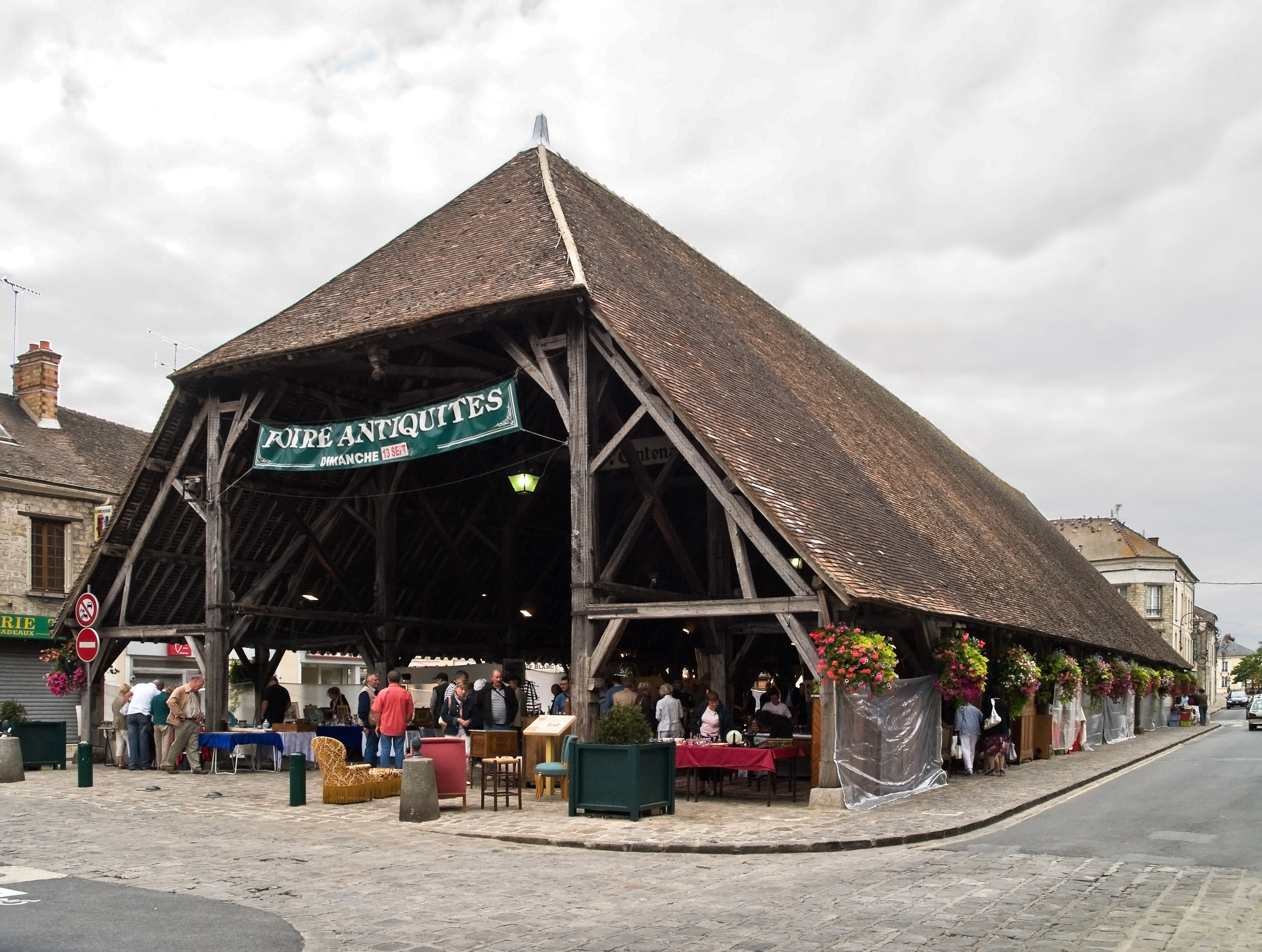
The market hall

Milly contains several facilities: such as the Collège Jean Rostand, the Conservatoire des Deux Vallées, a gymnasium and sports ground complex, a multimedia library, a swimming pool, a bus station, dealers in craft products and so on. There is a market every Thursday in the very impressive late medieval market hall, built in 1479.

The yearly calendar includes attic-clearing sales; at the opening of the summer holiday period, the town celebrates la Saint-Pierre, a fair is organised and there are several fairground rides and other attractions, as well as cultural stands for the sale of specialist food and craft products.

== Economy ==
- Milly produces many culinary and medicinal herbs. The firm of Daregal is a world leader and began in 1887 under the leadership of the Darbonne family who still run the enterprise.
- The Conservatoire National des Plantes à Parfum, Médicinales, Aromatiques et Industrielles is a botanical garden situated in a former farm.

== Culture ==
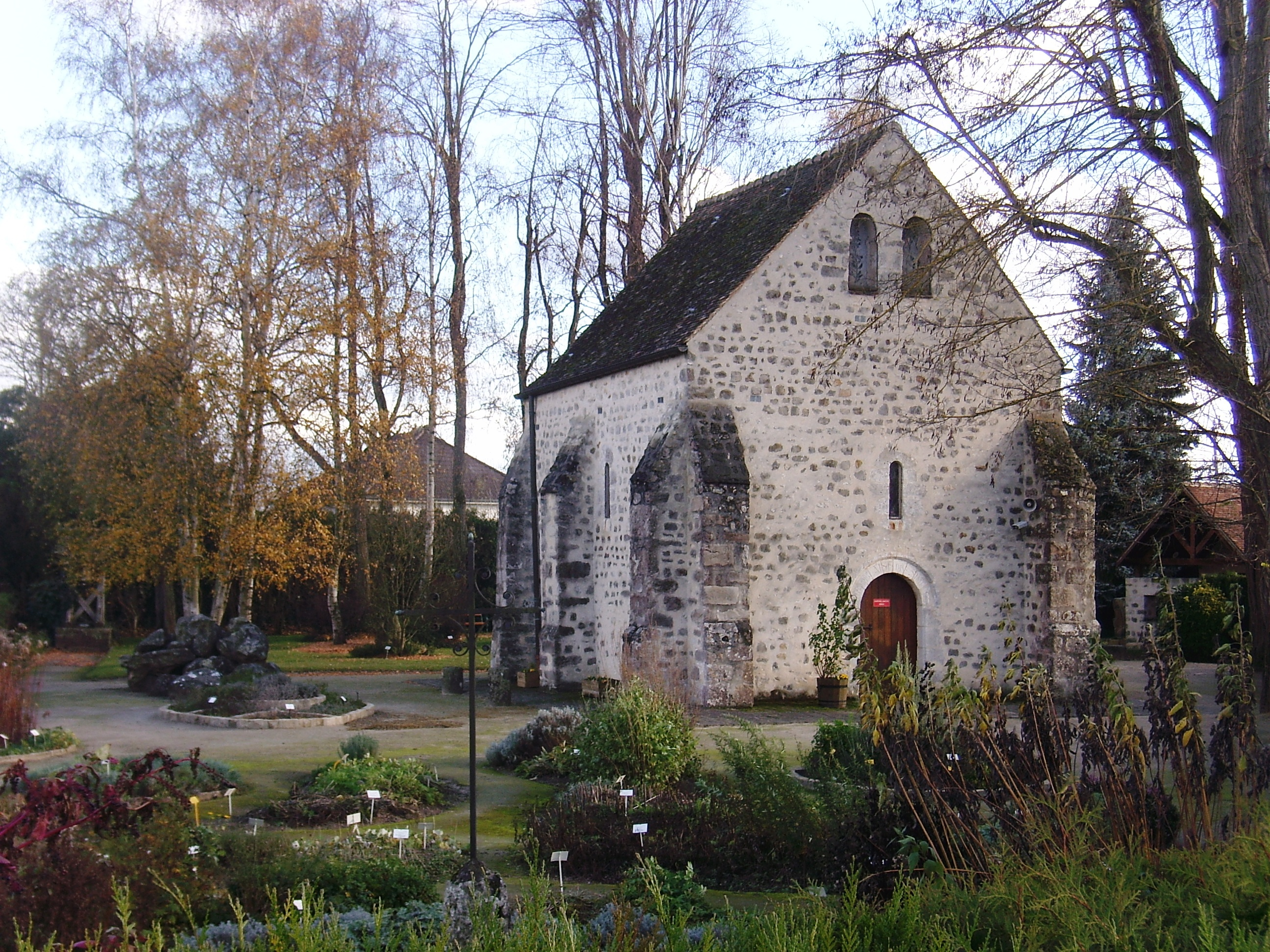
Chapelle Saint-Blaise-des-Simples

- Christian Dior and Jean Cocteau have made their homes here. Cocteau died in 1963.
  Towards the end of the 1950s Jean Cocteau decorated the chapelle Saint-Blaise, which dates from the twelfth century. His theme was those medicinal and culinary herbs on which the renown of Milly rests. He is now buried in the chapel.
- Le Cyclop, a monumental sculpture in the forest of Milly-la-Forêt, constructed by Jean Tinguely in collaboration with Niki de Saint Phalle
- the 15th century covered market

== Twin towns ==
Milly-la-Forêt is twinned with the German town of Morsbach, situated in the valley of the Sieg to the east of Cologne and with Forest Row in East Sussex, England.

== Famous people ==
- Dagobert I (v.602–638 or 639), King of the Franks was crowned in Milly.
- Wulfram of Sens (647–703), archbishop of Sens and Saint was born there.
- Louis IX (1214–1270), King of France lived there
- Hugues II de Bouville (1240–1304), chamberlain of Philip the Fair and lord of Bouville.
- Hugues III de Bouville (1275–1331), his son, chamberlain of Philip the Fair who owned the castle.
- Jean de Clisson (died 1346), owner of the castle of Milly through his mother, Blanche de Bouville.
- Olivier V de Clisson (1336–1407), owner of the castle of Milly.
- Charles VI (1368–1422), King of France, lived there.
- Louis XI (1423–1483), King of France, lived there.
- Henri IV (1553–1610), King of France, lived there.
- Jacques Nicolas Bellavène (1770–1826), General of division, died there.
- Napoléon Bonaparte (1769–1821), Emperor of French, lived there.
- Jean Cocteau (1889–1963), poet and graphist, lived and died there.
- Christian Dior (1905–1957), dressmaker, he lived there.
- Jean Marais (1913–1998), actor, lived there.
- Jean Tinguely (1925–1991), artist, worked there.
- Jean-Marie Gustave Le Clézio (1940– ), writer and awarded from the Nobel Prize in Literature, lived there.
