= Jean-Louis Ezine =

French writer, journalist and radio host

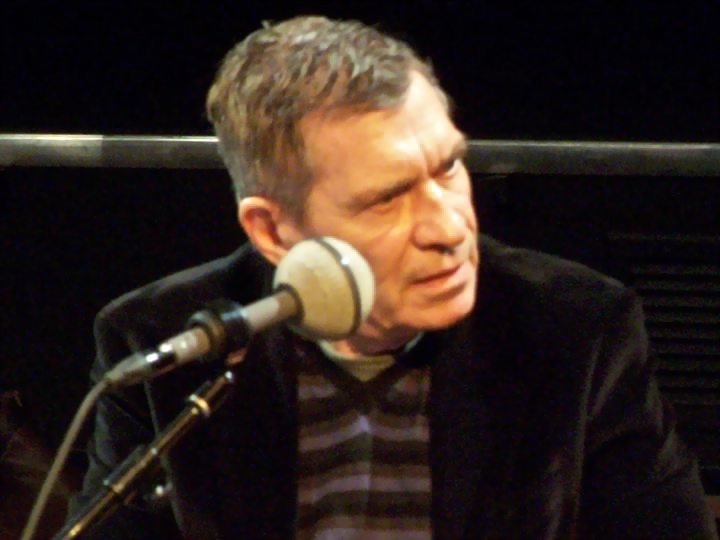
Jean-Louis Ezine in 2012 during Le Masque et la Plume radio program.

Jean-Louis Ezine, real name Jean-Louis Bunel (born 24 September 1948 in Cabourg) is a French writer, journalist and radio host.

== Biography ==
Born Jean-Louis Bunel by the name of his mother before taking that of his father-in-law at the age of three, Jean-Louis Ezine grew up at Lisieux in Normandy before studying literature and philosophy. While studying in Caen, he made his journalistic debut as a stringer in the weekly Pays d’Auge-Tribune. He left for Paris, performed his military service in 1968/69 in Toulon, then in Fréjus and finally in Djibouti in the naval infantry. He joined the editorial staff of Pif Gadget. In 1972, he became a literary critic for Les Nouvelles littéraires, a journal of which he became editor-in-chief and literary director, and then entered in 1984 at the Nouvel Observateur where he is still working. He also collaborated with the weekly L'Express.

From 8 January 1990, Jean-Louis Ezine held a daily three-minute column on France Culture, taking the form of a humorous and often caustic humor note, in the successive morning programs of the station: Culture matin, Tout arrive !, Pas la peine de crier, then La Matinale. On July 19, 2013, he delivered his 5651st and latest chronicle after the decision taken by the radio station to put a halt to the program. Ezine was also a member of the literary program Le Masque et la Plume on France Inter - of which he was a true pillar, and one of the speakers with the most singular tone since the beginning of the 1990s.

In 2011, Ezine was a juror of the prix Françoise Sagan.

== Work ==
Novels

- 1983: La Chantepleure, éditions du Seuil, ISBN 2-02-006601-7
- 2003: Un ténébreux, éditions du Seuil, ISBN 978-2-02-019342-9
- 2009: Les Taiseux, éditions Gallimard, ISBN 9782070126521 — prix Maurice Genevoix and prix Octave-Mirbeau

Collections of texts and interviews

- 1981: Les Écrivains sur la sellette (collection of interviews with thirty eight writers), éditions du Seuil ISBN 9782020056366 — prix Broquette-Gonin of the Académie française
- 1994: Du train où vont les jours. (collection of columns broadcast in 1994 on France Culture), éditions du Seuil, ISBN 9782020183543
- 1994: Propos d'un emmerdeur (conversations with Étiemble), Arléa, ISBN 9782869592148
- 1995: Ailleurs (conversations with Jean-Marie Le Clézio), Arléa, ISBN 9782869592445
- 1995: Entre nous soit dit (conversations with Philippe Djian), Plon, ISBN 9782259181051
