= Geoff Winningham =

American photographer, journalist and filmmaker

Geoffrey Lea Winningham (born March 4, 1943) is an American photographer, journalist, and filmmaker best known for his photographs and documentary films focusing on Texas and Mexican culture. Geoff's work was first recognized in the early 1970s when he published the book Friday Night in the Coliseum, featuring his photographs of professional wrestling and recorded conversations with wrestlers and fans. The book was followed in 1972 by a 16mm, black and white documentary film of the same title.

Over the course of his career he has received two Guggenheim Fellowships, five grants from the National Endowment for the Arts, and numerous commissions. He has lived in Houston, Texas, and taught photography in the Department of Visual and Dramatic Arts at Rice University since 1969. In addition, he directs the Pozos Art Project, Inc., a non-profit enterprise offering art and photography opportunities to children in Texas and in Mexico.

== Early life and education ==
Geoff Winningham was born on March 4, 1943, in Jackson, Tennessee. At the age of 13, he became fascinated with cameras, immersed himself in photography, found a part-time job as a studio and darkroom assistant, built a darkroom in his family home, and made his first photo-book, a handmade volume of portraits of his friends. At the age of 14, he left home to continue his secondary education as a boarding student at Battle Ground Academy in Franklin, Tennessee.

In 1961 he moved to Houston, Texas, to study at Rice University, majoring in English literature. While studying at Rice he renewed his interest in photography, encouraged by several English professors, most notably Professor Gerald O'Grady, his first and most important mentor. After earning his bachelor's degree from Rice, he entered the Master's program at the IIT Institute of Design in Chicago, Illinois, where he studied with Aaron Siskind, Arthur Siegel, and Wynn Bullock, completing his MS degree in 1968.

== Books ==
- In the Eyes of Our Children: Houston, An American City, Houston: Pozos Art Project, 2017.
- Of the Soil: Photographs of Vernacular Architecture and Stories of Changing Times in Arkansas, Fayetteville, AR: University of Arkansas Press, 2014.
- Going Back to Galveston: Nature, Funk and Fantasy in a Favorite Place, College Station, TX: Texas A&M University Press, Text by J. Killingsworth, 94 photos. 2011.
- Traveling the Shore of the Spanish Sea: The Gulf Coast of Texas and Mexico, College Station, TX: Texas A&M University Press, 2010.
- The Pozos Art Project: Art from the 2009 Workshops, Houston, TX: Pozos Art Project, 2009.
- Mi Pueblo: The Pozos Children's Project, Houston, TX: The Jung Center of Houston, 2008.
- Along Forgotten River, Austin, TX: Texas State Historical Association, 2003.
- In the Eye of the Sun: Mexican Fiestas, with essays by J. M. G. LeClezio and introduction by Richard Rodriguez, New York, NY: W. W. Norton & Co., 1997.
- Rice University: A 75th Anniversary Portrait, Houston, TX: Rice University Press, 1987.
- A Place of Dreams: Houston, an American City, Houston, TX: Rice University Press, 1986.
- Rites of Fall: High School Football in Texas, Austin, TX: University of Texas Press,1979.
- Geoff Winningham: Photographs, Houston, TX: Museum of Fine Arts, 1974.
- Going Texan: The Days of the Houston Livestock Show and Rodeo, New York, NY: Horizon Press, 1972.
- Friday Night in the Coliseum, Houston, TX: Allison Press, 1971.

== Films ==
- In Our Fathers' Sweetest Dreams: High School Football in Texas, (16 mm, 30 min.), produced with funding from the Southwest Alternate Media Project, 1993.
- The Pleasures of this Stately Dome, (16 mm, 54 min.), produced with funding from the NEA, Public Media Section, 1976.
- Friday Night in the Coliseum, (16 mm, 35 min.), produced for the Corporation for Public Broadcasting, 1972.

== Magazine work ==
- "The Eye of the Bull," Texas Monthly, October 1991.
- "A Fool for Mules," Texas Monthly, May 1991.
- "An Arabian for the Ages," Connoisseur, March 1989.
- "My Kind of Town," Texas Monthly, September 1988.
- "Football: Game of Life," Texas Monthly, October 1983.
- "281," Texas Monthly, July 1982.
- "Foat Wuth, The Eternal City," Texas Monthly, June 1982.
- "Houston, Texas: City of Destiny," Texas Monthly, October 1981.
- "Rites of Fall," American Photographer, December 1979.
- "Friday Night Heroes," Texas Monthly, October 1976.
- "Beach Party," Texas Monthly, August 1976.
- "Our Town," Texas Monthly, June 1976.
- "An Apology for the Life of Joe H. Klein," Esquire, December 1973.
- "Mes Nuits Chaudes Dans Le Temple du Catch," Photo (Paris), December 1972.

== Exhibitions ==
- Dallas Museum of Fine Arts, 2017.
- Brooklyn Museum of Art, 2017.
- Butler Center for Arkansas Studies, Little Rock, 2015.
- Brandon Gallery, Houston, 2015.
- Koelsch Gallery, Houston, March–April 2012.
- Robert Anderson Gallery, New York, 2011.
- Wittliff Gallery, Texas State University, 2008.
- Beeville Art Museum, Beeville, Texas, 2005.
- Harrison Museum of Art, Utah State University, Logan, Utah, August–September 2004.
- Palm Springs Art Museum, Palm Springs, California, 2002.
- Special Collections Gallery, University of Arkansas, Fayetteville, 1999.
- Leica Gallery, New York, 1998.
- Duke University, Museum of Art, Durham, 1997.
- Museo Rufino Tamayo, Oaxaca, Mexico, 1996.
- Elizabeth Koogler McNay Museum, 1996.
- Sewall Gallery, Rice University, 1986.
- Nimbus Gallery, Dallas, 1986.
- San Antonio Museum of Art, May 1983.
- Harris Gallery, Houston, 1982.
- Wah Lui Gallery, Seattle, 1980.
- Cronin Gallery, Houston, 1977.
- Afterimage Gallery, Dallas, 1976.
- Madison Art Center, Madison, Wisconsin, 1975.
- Witkin Gallery, New York, 1975.
- Museum of Fine Arts, Houston, 1974.

== Collections ==
- Museum of Fine Arts, Houston
- Museum of Modern Art, New York,
- Metropolitan Museum of Art, New York,
- San Francisco Museum of Modern Art, San Francisco
- Boston Museum of Art, Boston
- International Museum of Photography (George Eastman Museum), Rochester
- Harvard University Museum, Cambridge
- Princeton University Art Museum, Princeton
- Dallas Museum of Fine Arts, Dallas
- San Antonio Museum of Art, San Antonio
- Museum of Photographic Arts, San Diego
- Wittliff Collections of Southwestern and Mexican Photography, San Marcos
- New Orleans Museum of Art, New Orleans
- United States Library of Congress, Washington,
- J. Paul Getty Museum, Los Angeles

== Awards and commissions ==
- Ned Shank Award for Outstanding Preservation Publication, Preserve Arkansas, 2015.
- John Brinkerhoff Jackson Book Prize – Special Recognition for the best book on the American landscape for Traveling the Shore of the Spanish Sea, Foundation for Landscape Studies, 2011.
- Ron Tyler Award for the Best Illustrated Book on Texas History and Culture for Traveling the Shore of the Spanish Sea, Texas State Historical Association, 2010.
- Urban Investment and Development Company, commission to photograph "Central Houston," 1983–86.
- National Endowment for the Arts, Media Arts Grant for a documentary film on Texas high school football, 1983.
- First Federal of Arkansas, commission to photograph "The Vernacular Architecture of Arkansas," 1980–81.
- John Simon Guggenheim Fellowship, for "Photographs of Texas High School Football," 1978.
- National Endowment for the Arts, Photography Fellowship for "A Photographic Study of Football in Texas," 1977.
- Seagrams Foundation, commission to photograph "County Courthouses of the Southern United States," 1975–76.
- Kimbell Art Museum, commission to photograph the Kimbell Museum for the book Light is the Theme, 1975.
- National Endowment for the Arts, Photography Fellowship for "Photographs of Rural Festivals in Texas," 1975.
- National Endowment for the Arts, Public Media Grant for a film on the Houston Astrodome, 1974.
- John Simon Guggenheim Fellowship, for "Photographs of Texas," 1972.
- Corporation for Public Broadcasting, Grant for the film Friday Night in the Coliseum, 1971.
