= Fever (short story collection) =

1965 set of short stories by J. M. G. Le Clézio

- First UK edition
- Author: J.M.G. Le Clézio
- Original title: La fièvre
- Translator: Daphne Woodward
- Language: French
- Genre: Short story collection
- Publisher: Gallimard
- Publication date: 1965
- Publication place: France
- English publication date: 1966
- Media type: Print
- Pages: 239 pp
- ISBN: 978-2-07-072257-0
- OCLC: 783704

Fever (French: La fièvre) is the title of a set of short stories written in French by French Nobel laureate J. M. G. Le Clézio and translated into English by Daphne Woodward as Fever and published by Atheneum in the US and Hamish Hamilton in the UK.

== Contents ==
A collection of nine short stories or novellas. The Nobel Prize in Literature 2008 Bio-bibliography mentions this as one of the books in which the author "alludes to his own perception of the trouble and fear reigning in some cities in the western world".

- Introductory Letter (by Le Clézio);
- La fièvre (Fever)
- Le jour où Beaumont fit connaissance avec sa douleur (The Day that Beaumont became Acquainted with his Pain)
- me semble que le bateau se dirige vers lîle (It Seems to Me the Boat is Heading for the Island)
- (Backwards)
- (The Walking Man)
- Martin (Martin)
- (The World is Alive)
- (Then I shall be able to Find Peace and Slumber)
- (A Day of Old Age)

== Publication history ==
=== First French language edition ===
This French language collection of short stories

- Le Clézio, J.M.G. (1965). La fièvre (in French). Paris: Éditions GallimardL'Imaginaire. p. 230. ISBN 978-2-07-072257-0.

=== Second French language edition ===
- Le Clézio, J.M.G. (1991-04-12). La fièvre (Nouv. éd.) (in French). Paris: Éditions Gallimard. p. 230. ISBN 978-2-07-072257-0.

=== First English translation ===
- Le Clézio, J.M.G.; Translated by Daphne Woodward (1966). The Fever. London: Hamish Hamilton. p. 239. OCLC 9858649.
