= Voyage au pays des arbres =

1978 novel by J. M. G. Le Clézio

- First edition
- Author: J. M. G. Le Clézio
- Original title: Voyage au pays des arbres
- Illustrator: Henri Galeron
- Language: French
- Genre: Novel
- Publisher: Gallimard-Jeunesse/Folio Cadet, Paris
- Publication date: 1978
- Publication place: France
- Pages: 34 pp
- ISBN: 978-2-07-053665-8
- OCLC: 316134099

Voyage au pays des arbres is a novel written in French by French Nobel laureate J. M. G. Le Clézio. A little boy is bored and dreams of traveling deep into the forest, where he meets a profound old oak and gets invited to a party by some young trees.
