= Le Jour où Beaumont fit connaissance avec sa douleur =

1964 novella by J. M. G. Le Clézio

- First edition
- Author: J. M. G. Le Clézio
- Language: French
- Publisher: Mercure de France Collection Bleue, Paris
- Publication date: 1964
- Publication place: France
- Media type: Print
- OCLC: 13224066

Le Jour où Beaumont fit connaissance avec sa douleur is a novella written in French by French Nobel laureate writer J. M. G. Le Clézio. It is one of the first published texts he wrote. This novella was published in book form after the famous Le Procès-Verbal (The Official Report), his first novel which won the Renaudot Prize in 1963. This novella was also included in a collection of short stories entitled La fièvre (The Fever), (pages 60 to 87).

== Title in English ==
Le Jour où Beaumont fit connaissance avec sa douleur could be translated as The Day Beaumont Became Acquainted with His Pain or, The Day Beaumont Became Aware of His Pain, or even "The Day Beaumont Met His Pain."

== Reviews ==
There is a review in a blog called The Valve, where this novella was mentioned as having piqued the author's interest because of an opening paragraph written in the same style as Malone Meurt (Malone Dies):

La première fois que Beaumont dut faire connaissance avec sa douleur, ce fut au lit, vers quelque chose comme trois heures vingt-cinq du matin. Il se retourna sur le matelas, péniblement, et sentit la résistance des couvertures et des draps qui participaient à son mouvement de rotation, mais d’une façon incongrue, en s’y opposant. Comme si une main invisible avait tordu les tissus autour de son torse et de ses hanches immobiles. The first time Beaumont became acquainted with his pain, he was in bed, and it must have been twenty-five past three in the morning. He turned over on the mattress, painfully, and felt the resistance of those bed-covers which took part in his turning, while in an incongruous way, opposing it. It was as if an invisible hand had twisted the material around his torso as well as his unmoving hips.

== Publication history ==
=== French magazine ===
"Le jour où Beaumont fit connaissance avec sa douleur." Paris, page à page. Textes choisis et annotés par Pierre-Edmond Robert. (Texts selected and annotated by Pierre-Edmond Robert.) Hatier: Dider, Paris, 191p.e

=== First French edition ===
- Le Clézio, Le Clézio (1964). Le Jour où Beaumont fit connaissance avec sa douleur (in French). Paris: Mercure de France Collection Bleue. p. 57. ISBN 2-7152-1370-0.

=== Second French edition ===
- Le Clézio, J. M. G.; Pierre-Edmond Robert (1985-03-22). Le Jour où Beaumont fit connaissance avec sa douleur (in French). Paris: Mercure de France(Nouvelle édition)Collection Bleue. p. 87. ISBN 978-2-7152-1370-8. "Salles H et V – Littératures d'expression française – [84/4 LECL 4 jour]"

=== Third French edition ===
- Le Clézio, J. M. G.; Pierre-Edmond Robert (1992). Le Jour où Beaumont fit connaissance avec sa douleur. Paris: dans Paris, page à page.

=== Fourth French edition ===
- Le Clézio, J. M. G.; Pierre-Edmond Robert (2001). Le Jour où Beaumont fit connaissance avec sa douleur. Paris: Mercure De France Collection Le Petit Mercure. p. 62. ISBN 978-2-7152-2294-6.
