= Villa Aurore =

1999 novel by J. M. G. Le Clézio

- 1986 edition
- Author: J. M. G. Le Clézio
- Original title: Villa Aurore
- Illustrator: Georges Lemoine, MD
- Language: French
- Genre: Novel
- Publisher: Gallimard
- Publication date: 1999
- Publication place: France
- Pages: 89 pp
- ISBN: 2-07-051396-3
- OCLC: 262892852

Villa Aurore is a novel written in French by French Nobel laureate J. M. G. Le Clézio.

== Publication history ==
=== Nouvelle Revue Française ===
Nouvelle Revue Française, 350, mars: 30–50.1982

=== First French edition ===
Le Clézio, J. M. G (1999). Villa Aurore (in French). Illustrated by Georges Lemoine, MD. Paris: Gallimard. p. 89. ISBN 2-07-051396-3.

=== Other French language edition ===
Le Clézio, J. M. G (2008). Villa Aurore et autres histoires (in French). Illustrated by Georges Lemoine, MD. Stuttgart;Germany: Stuttgart Reclam(Reclams Universal-Bibliothek, Nr. 19742 : Fremdsprachentexte 2008). p. 167. ISBN 978-3-15-019742-4. "Translated:This Edition published for the Federal Republic of Germany, Austria and Switzerland with a Bibliography pages 149 to 152; German original text:"Ausg. für die Bundesrepublik Deutschland, Österreich und die Schweiz. – Literaturverz. S. 149 – 152""
