= In the Eye of the Sun: Mexican Fiestas =

Book of photographs by Geoff Winningham

In the Eye of the Sun: Mexican Fiestas (Three Indian Celebrations]
- Author: Geoff Winningham, introduction by Richard Rodriguez, Foreword(Three Indian Celebrations: an essay) J. M. G. Le Clézio
- Translator: Jennifer Curtiss Gage for the Foreword (Three Indian Celebrations: an essay)
- Language: English, Foreword translated from the French
- Genre: nonfiction
- Publisher: W. W. Norton & Co Ltd., New York "A Constance Sullivan book."
- Publication date: 1996-11-01
- Publication place: United States of America
- Pages: 96 pages
- ISBN: 978-0-393-31584-4
- OCLC: 35086198
- Dewey Decimal: 394.2/6972 20
- LC Class: GT4814.A2 W56 1997

In the Eye of the Sun: Mexican Fiestas is a book of photographs by Geoff Winningham. The book is a study of the popular fiestas of Mexico, showing the inhabitants of several Mexican villages. The fiestas intertwine some of the great pagan festivals with Catholic ritual and tradition. These photographs show family scenes, revelers and religious ceremonies.

== Subject of the book ==
Geoff Winningham began photographing the popular fiestas of Mexico in 1984. Returning to the same Mexican villages several times a year, he formed personal relationships with families who permitted him to photograph them in the intimacy of their homes, and local officials who gave him special access to all phases of the celebrations. The fiestas provide tangible links to the pre-Hispanic cultures of middle America, intertwining some of the great Pagan festivals of these ancient peoples with catholic ritual and tradition.

— Synopsis from the publisher "W W Norton"

== About the photographer Geoff Winningham ==
Geoff Winningham, is best known for his more than fourteen books of photographs and three documentary films relating to North American culture. Geoff has travelled extensively in Mexico, guiding small groups and teaching them photography in Mexico since 1980. After completing an eleven-year study of the popular fiestas of Mexico in 1996 he published the book, In the Eye of the Sun. Since the completion of this project, he has focused primarily on landscape photography.

Winningham heads the photography program in the Department of Visual Arts at Rice University, where he has taught since 1969. He also teaches children in Houston, Texas and Pozos, Mexico through the non-profit organization co-created with his wife Janice Freeman, The Pozos Art Project .

== Images from In the Eye of the Sun ==
In the Eye of the Sun: Mexican Fiestas. Geoff Winningham began photographing the popular fiestas of Mexico in 1984

== Foreword (an essay): J. M. G. Le Clezio ==
=== Three Indian Celebrations ===
Written as a complement to Geoff Winningham's collection of photographs In The Eye of The Sun: Mexican Fiestas, Le Clézio's "Three Indian Celebrations" is an essay in three sections which describes his time among the Embera people in the province of Darién, Panama; the Indian mass at San Juan Parangaricutiro, Michoacán, Mexico; and the Corn Mass in Chun Pom, Quintana Roo, Mexico. Le Clézio writes that the Embera are "completely lacking in political organization or religious institutions, the ceremonial function is fulfilled by the 'Beka', a feast of song. This ritual is the most extraordinary moment in the peoples' lives, the moment that affords them the possibility of encountering the invisible forces that surround them and of treating the sick." His account of the Corn Mass briefly describes the history of the people of Quintana Roo and quotes from the last words of Juan de la Cruz Ceh.

In his treatment of these festivals Le Clézio maintains his characteristic style: a sense of respect, admiration, and artistic curiosity for the world of others. He plays, in a sense, the perennial role of an outsider looking into the world of another culture, a man exploring his world through the art of a different humanity. He closes the section on the Embera's ritual singing with the following explanation: "I wanted to describe the singing festival of the Embera Indians because participating in it radically changed my idea of art—the affirmation of another time and another reality that is art. Having once had this experience, I realized I could never again witness an art form more complete and more laden with meaning than this one, whose goal was not only to cure but also to restore lost equilibrium.…I had found the most perfect form, the deepest expression that a human being can give to any quest."

=== The photographer Winningham chooses Le Clezio to write an essay ===
Winningham said Thursday that he'd approached Le Clezio because he thought his book The American Dream: Or the Interrupted Thought of Amerindian Civilizations "the best thing ever written on the early history of Mexico."In his dealings with Le Clezio, Winningham was struck by the French writer's genuineness and humility.

— Winningham

== Publication history ==
=== First English edition ===
- Winningham, Geoff (1996-11-01). In the Eye of the Sun: Mexican Fiestas. New York: W. W. Norton & Co Ltd. ISBN 978-0-393-31584-4.

=== Second English edition ===
- Winningham, Geoff (1997-02-26). In the Eye of the Sun: Mexican Fiestas. New York: W. W. Norton & Co Ltd. ISBN 978-0-393-31584-4.
