= The Mexican Dream, or, The Interrupted Thought of Amerindian Civilizations =

Book by Jean-Marie Gustave Le Clézio

The Mexican Dream, Or, The Interrupted Thought of Amerindian Civilizations
- First edition (translated)
- Author: J.M.G. Le Clézio
- Original title: Le Rêve mexicain ou la pensée interrompue
- Translator: Teresa Lavender Fagan
- Language: French translated into English
- Subject: Mesoamerican History
- Publisher: University of Chicago Press (translation)
- Publication date: 1965
- Publication place: France
- English publication date: 1993
- Media type: Print
- Pages: 221 pp
- ISBN: 978-0-226-11002-8
- OCLC: 27814151
- Dewey Decimal: 972/.018 20
- LC Class: F1230 .L3413 1993

The Mexican Dream, Or, The Interrupted Thought of Amerindian Civilizations is an English translation of an essay written in French by J. M. G. Le Clézio first published in 1988. The subjects are Latin American history, Latin American studies, Romance languages, as well as comparative studies and history of religion

11 editions were published between 1988 and 2004 in 5 languages and held by 835 libraries worldwide.

== Contents ==
Le Clézio conducts an inquiry into the disappearance of the indigenous cultures of Mesoamerica in the 16th century, particularly the end of the Mexican civilization at the hands of the Spanish conquistadors. The author analyses the personalities of characters such as Hernán Cortés, La Malinche, Moctezuma II, Cuauhtémoc, and other key figures.

He refers extensively to the descriptions offered by Bernal Díaz del Castillo in his Historia verdadera de la conquista de la Nueva España in analysing the events. He imagines what might have happened if the native populations had not been reduced, and what their impact on Western civilization might have been. Claiming that the West holds both economic and cultural sway over the contemporary world because of the colonization of America, he wonders how the cultural life of Mesoamerica – particularly that of the Aztecs – would have evolved had the arrival of the Europeans not decimated these societies.

== Reviews ==
Le Figaro and Kirkus Reviews reviewed the book.
