= Cintano =

- Comune
- Comune di Cintano
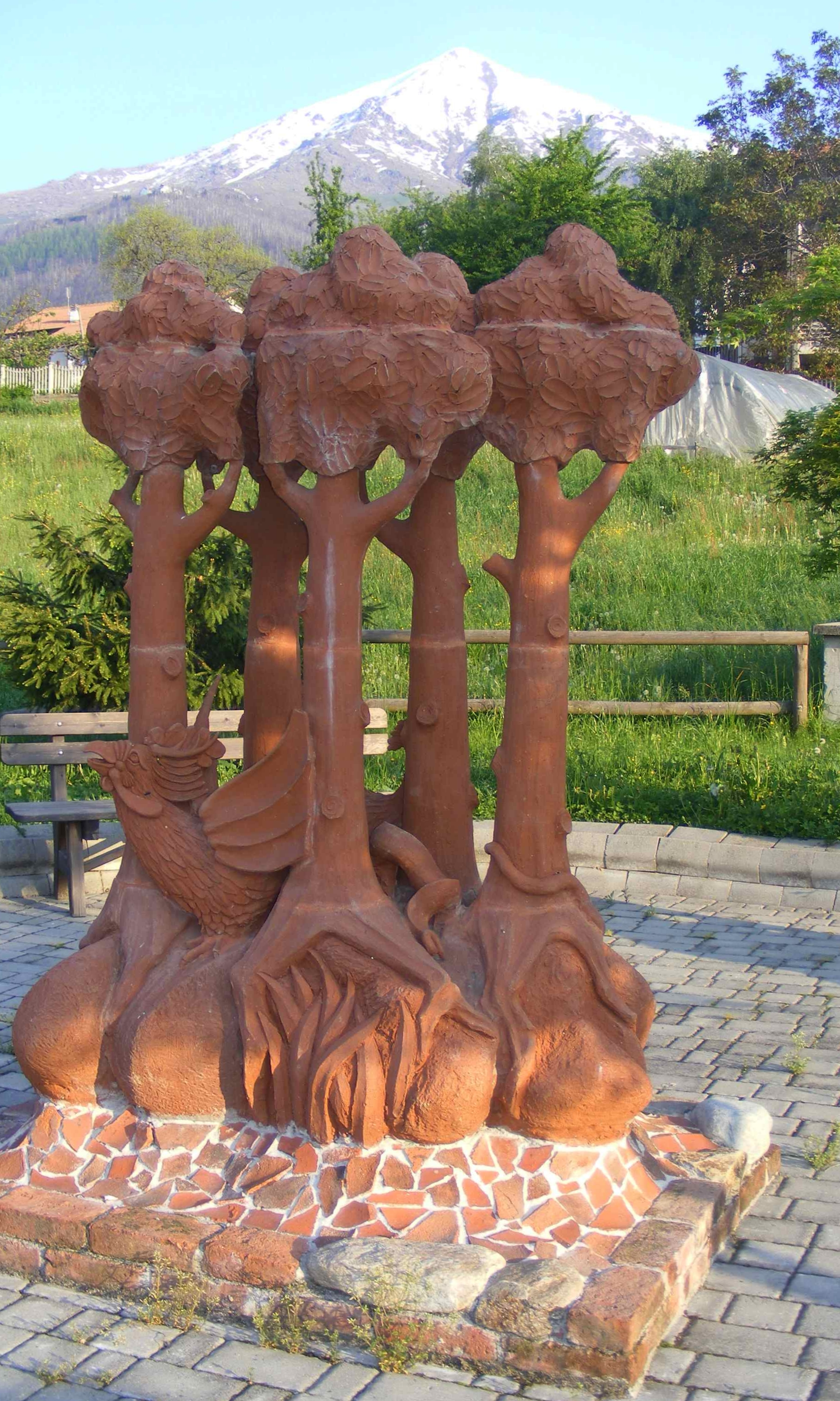

- Location within Italy Location within Piedmont
- Coordinates: 45°26′N 7°41′E
- Country: Italy
- Region: Piedmont
- Metropolitan city: Turin (TO)
- Frazioni: Arià, Bosa, Brichet, Buria, Cantel, Chiesa, Grangia, Gumbal, Guy, Malpasso, Marcellina, Molinatta, Pasquarolo, Quadevia, San Rocco, Santuario

Government
  - Mayor: Daniela Contini (Percorso Comune)

Area
  - Total: 4.9 km^{2} (1.9 sq mi)
- Elevation: 646 m (2,119 ft)

Population (31 December 2010)
  - Total: 252
  - Density: 51/km^{2} (130/sq mi)
- Demonym: Cintanesi
- Time zone: UTC+1 (CET)
  - Summer (DST): UTC+2 (CEST)
- Postal code: 10080
- Dialing code: 0124
- Saint day: 24/06

Cintano is a comune (municipality) in the Metropolitan City of Turin in the Italian region Piedmont, located about 40 kilometres (25 mi) north of Turin.

Cintano borders the following municipalities: Castellamonte, Colleretto Castelnuovo, and Castelnuovo Nigra.
