= Jai =

Jai or JAI may refer to:

== People ==
- Jason Rowe (born 1969), British pop/soul singer who recorded under the name Jai in the late 1990s
- Jai (actor) (born 1985), Indian Tamil film actor
- Jai Brooks, comedian from the Australian YouTube group The Janoskians
- Jai Courtney (born 1986), Australian actor
- Jai Hindley (born 1996), Australian cyclist
- Jai Ingham (born 1993), Australian footballer
- Jai Koutrae (born 1975), Australian actor
- Jai Lucas (born 1988), American basketball coach and former professional and collegiate basketball player
- Jai McDowall (born 1986), Scottish singer who won the fifth series of Britain's Got Talent
- Jai Rodriguez (born 1979), American actor and musician, known for the TV show Queer Eye for the Straight Guy
- Jai Taurima (born 1972), long jump champion of Australia
- Jai Waetford (born 1999), Australian recording artist who came third on the fifth season of The X Factor Australia

== Films ==
- Jai (2004 Tamil film), a 2004 Indian film starring Prashanth Thyagarajan
- Jai (2004 Telugu film), a 2004 Indian film starring Navdeep

== Fictional characters ==
- Jai, orphan boy sidekick to Tarzan in the 1966–1968 television series
- Jai (Sholay), in the 1975 Indian film Sholay
- ACP Jai Dixit, a fictional police officer in the Dhoom franchise of Indian films

== Abbreviations and codes ==
- Jaipur International Airport (IATA: JAI), in Jaipur, India
- Java Advanced Imaging, an API for the Java platform
- Jet Airways (ICAO: JAI), an Indian airline
- Jewish Agency for Israel
- John Adams Institute for Accelerator Science
- Journal of Astronomical Instrumentation, a peer-reviewed academic journal by World Scientific

== Other uses ==
- Jai (programming language), a work-in-progress low level programming language developed by Jonathan Blow
- Jai, India, a village in Meerut District, India
- Jai Valley, a valley in Bhaderwah, Jammu and Kashmir, India
- Radio Jai, a Jewish radio station broadcasting from Buenos Aires, Argentina
- Jai, a shortened spelling of Luóhàn zhāi (Buddha's delight)

== See also ==
- Chai (disambiguation)
- HAI (disambiguation)
- Jai Hind (disambiguation)
- Jai ho (disambiguation)
- Jaya (disambiguation)
- Jay (disambiguation)
