= HAI =

HAI or hai may refer to:

== Films ==
- Hai (film), a 2002 Telugu film
- Hai, a 2017 Kannada film

== People ==
=== Surname ===
- Hai, a variant on the Chinese Xǔ (surname) (許/许)
- Hǎi, a Chinese surname (海)
- Hoàng Hải (born 1982), Vietnamese singer
- Thanh Hải (1930–1980), Vietnamese poet
- Fawzia Saeed Hai (1942–1968), Pakistani model

=== Given name ===
- Hai Gaon (939–1038), Jewish theologian, rabbi and scholar
- Yu Hai (born 1987), Chinese footballer
- Hai Lam (footballer), Norwegian footballer
- Hai Du Lam, American League of Legends player

== Places ==
- Hai, Lviv Oblast (Ukrainian: Гаї), a village in Ukraine
- Hai (Ukrainian: Гай), a village in Boiany Commune, Novoselytsia Raion, Ukraine
- Hai District, Tanzania
- Hai River, China
- Haiti, IOC and UNDP code HAI

== Technology ==
- Hai (midget submarine), a German submarine from World War II
- Hai (keelboat), a sloop-rigged one-design yacht class
- Hellenic Aerospace Industry
- Helicopter Association International
- Hemagglutination inhibition assay

== Other uses ==
- Haï, a book by Jean-Marie Gustave Le Clézio
- Hái!, a 2003 album by The Creatures
- Hai (Cantonese profanity)
- Hai (magazine), an Indonesian weekly for teenage boys
- Hai (symbol) or chai, letters of the Hebrew alphabet
- Hai! (Live in Japan), a 1982 album by Cabaret Voltaire
- Hai dialect, of West Kilimanjaro language
- Health Action International, non-profit organization based in The Netherlands
- Heterosexual Anal Intercourse, see Anal sex
- Hospital-acquired infection, or healthcare-associated infection
- Humanist Association of Ireland
- Wolfpack Hai, a wolfpack of German U-boats during World War II
- Half as Interesting, a YouTube channel hosted by Sam Denby

== See also ==
- Hailuoto
- Jai (disambiguation)
