= Jaishankar (name) =

Jaishankar may also refer to:

- Jaishankar Prasad (1889 – 1937), Indian writer and playwright
- Jaishankar (actor) (1938 – 2000), Indian actor
- Jaishankar Menon (born 1956), Indian-American computer scientist
- Jaishankar Bhojak (1889 – 1975), also known as Jaishankar Sundari, an Indian actor and director
- S. Jaishankar (born 1955), an Indian diplomat and politician

== See also ==
- Jai (disambiguation)
- Shankar (disambiguation)
