= Immigration by country =

This article delineates the issue of immigration in different countries.

== Region-specific factors for immigration ==
=== Europe ===
Citizens of one member nation of the European Union are allowed to work in other member nations with little to no restriction on movement. This is aided by the EURES network, which brings together the European Commission and the public employment services of the countries belonging to the European Economic Area and Switzerland. For non-EU-citizen permanent residents in the EU, movement between EU-member states is considerably more difficult. After 155 new waves of accession to the European Union, earlier members have often introduced measures to restrict participation in "their" labour markets by citizens of the new EU-member states. For instance, Austria, Belgium, Denmark, France, Germany, Greece, Italy, Luxembourg, Netherlands, Portugal, and Spain each restricted their labor market for up to seven years both in the 2004 and 2007 round of accession.

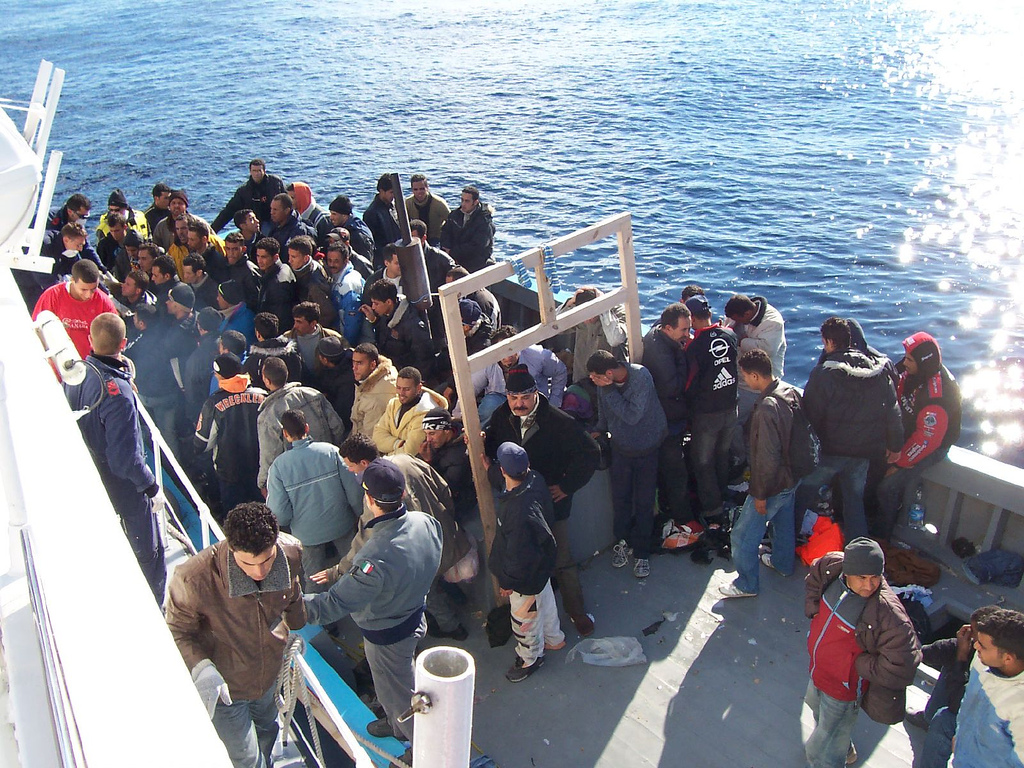
North African immigrants near the Italian island of Sicily

Due to the European Union's—in principle—single internal labour market policy, countries such as Italy and the Republic of Ireland that have seen relatively low levels of labour immigration until recently (and which have often sent a significant portion of their population overseas in the past) are now seeing an influx of immigrants from EU countries with lower per capita annual earning rates, triggering nationwide immigration debates. Spain, meanwhile, is seeing growing illegal immigration from Africa. As Spain is the closest EU member nation to Africa—Spain even has two autonomous cities (Ceuta and Melilla) on the African continent, as well as an autonomous community (the Canary Islands) west of North Africa, in the Atlantic—it is physically easiest for African emigrants to reach. This has led to debate both within Spain and between Spain and other EU members. Spain has asked for border control assistance from other EU states; the latter have responded that Spain has brought the wave of African illegal migrants on itself by granting amnesty to hundreds of thousands of undocumented foreigners.

The United Kingdom, France, and Germany have seen major immigration since the end of World War II and have been debating the issue for decades. Foreign workers were brought in to those countries to help rebuild after the war, and many stayed. Political debates about immigration typically focus on statistics, the immigration law and policy, and the implementation of existing restrictions. In some European countries, the debate in the 1990s was focused on asylum seekers, but restrictive policies within the European Union, as well as a reduction in armed conflict in Europe and neighboring regions, have sharply reduced asylum seekers.

=== Japan ===
Some countries, such as Japan, have opted for technological changes to increase profitability (for example, greater automation), and designed immigration laws specifically to prevent immigrants from coming to, and remaining within, the country. In 2007, minister Taro Aso described Japan as unique in being "one nation, one civilisation, one language, one culture and one race". In 2013, Japan accepted only six of 3,777 persons who applied for refugee status.

Japan is a highly unattractive migrant destination compared to other major industrialized countries; according to Gallup the number of potential migrants who wished to migrate to Japan was the lowest in the G7 and twelve times less than the number who wished to migrate to the United States, consistent with its low migrant inflows compared to the latter. Some Japanese scholars have pointed out that Japanese immigration laws, at least toward high-skilled migrants, are relatively lenient compared to other developed countries, and that the main factor behind its low migrant inflows is because it is a highly unattractive migrant destination compared to other developed countries. This is also apparent when looking at Japan's work visa programme for "specified skilled worker", which had less than 3,000 applicants, despite an annual goal of attracting 40,000 overseas workers, suggesting Japan faces major challenges in attracting migrants compared to other developed countries regardless of its immigration policies.

=== United States ===
In the United States, political debate on immigration has flared repeatedly. The country has seen unprecedented growth of immigrants since its independence in 1776, most recently for those of Asian descent.

== Immigration and Western social values ==
Many commentators have raised the issue that immigrants from certain cultures who move into Western countries may not be able to understand and assimilate certain Western concepts, that are relatively alien in some parts of the world, especially related to women's rights, domestic violence, LGBT rights and the supremacy of secular laws in front of religious practices. For instance, in some of the Islamic countries, it is legal and socially accepted for men to use physical violence against their wives if they "misbehave"; and wives are expected, both legally and socially, to "obey" their husbands. Various behaviours of women, such as refusing arranged marriages or having premarital sex, are seen in many parts of the world as justifying violence from family members, particularly parents. A 2010 survey conducted by the Pew Research Center found that stoning as a punishment for adultery was supported by 82% of respondents in Egypt and Pakistan, 70% in Jordan, 56% Nigeria, 42% in Indonesia; the death penalty for people who leave the Muslim religion was supported by 86% of respondents in Jordan, 84% in Egypt and 76% in Pakistan; sex segregation in the workplace was supported by 85% of respondents in Pakistan, 54% in Egypt, 50% in Jordan.

Some people argue that Western countries have worked hard and for a long time to achieve modern values, and they have the right to maintain these values, and protect them from threats. In 2007, Quebec premier Jean Charest said that Quebec had values such as equality of women and men and the separation between the state and religion and that "These values are fundamental. They cannot be the object of any accommodation. They cannot be subordinated to any other principle." (see reasonable accommodation). In recent years, several high-profile cases of honour killings, forced marriages and female genital mutilation among immigrant communities in Canada, the US and Europe have reignited the debate on immigration and integration. LGBT rights are another issue of controversy in relation to immigration, because homosexuality is in many parts of the world illegal and widely disapproved by society, and in some places it is even punishable by death (see sodomy laws and LGBT rights by country or territory). Some countries, such as the Netherlands, have adopted policies which explain to immigrants that they have to accept LGBT rights if they want to move to the country.

Many overlook the fact that immigrants are not necessarily representative of the broader population in their home countries. Research suggests that those who choose to migrate tend to be more open to new experiences than those who remain. As a result, their values may differ significantly from the prevailing norms in their countries of origin. In Sweden, for example, a study of approximately 2,000 recently arrived immigrants examined their views on 35 moral issues, including arranged marriages, premarital sex, and female genital mutilation. On average, the findings indicated that their values were relatively liberal.

== By country ==
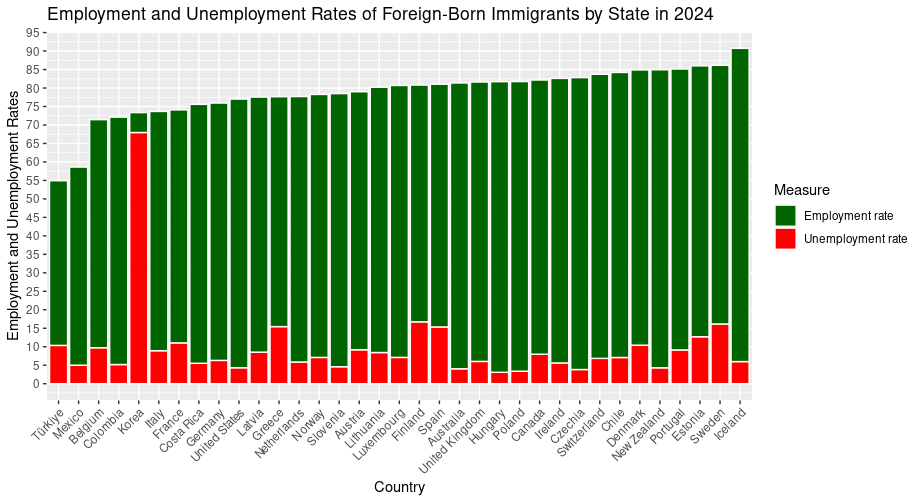
Data

The Commitment to Development Index ranks 22 of the world's richest countries on their immigration policies and openness to migrants and refugees from the poorest nations. See the CDI for information about specific country policies and evaluation not listed below.

=== Asia ===
==== Israel ====
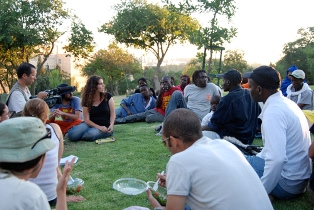
Meeting between Sudanese refugees and Israeli students, 2007. In Israel only Jewish immigrants automatically acquire Israeli citizenship.

Jewish immigration to Palestine during the 19th century was promoted by the Austro-Hungarian journalist Theodor Herzl in the late 19th century following the publication of "Der Judenstaat". His Zionist movement sought to encourage Jewish migration, or immigration, to Palestine. Its proponents regard its aim as self-determination for the Jewish people.

The percentage of world Jewry living in the former Mandatory Palestine has steadily grown from 25,000 since the movement came into existence. Today about 40% of the world's Jews live in Israel, more than in any other country.

The Israeli Law of Return, passed in 1950, gives those born Jews (having a Jewish mother or grandmother), those with Jewish ancestry (having a Jewish father or grandfather) and converts to Judaism (Orthodox, Reform, or Conservative denominations—not secular—though Reform and Conservative conversions must take place outside the state, similar to civil marriages) the right to immigrate to Israel. A 1970 amendment extended immigration rights to "a child and a grandchild of a Jew, the spouse of a Jew, the spouse of a child of a Jew and the spouse of a grandchild of a Jew". Over a million Jews from the former Soviet Union have immigrated to Israel since the 1990s, and large numbers of Ethiopian Jews were airlifted to the country in Operation Moses. In the year 1991, Israel helped 14,000 Ethiopian immigrants arrive in operation Solomon.

There were 35,638 African migrants living in Israel in 2011. Nearly 69,000 non-Jewish African migrants have entered Israel in recent years.

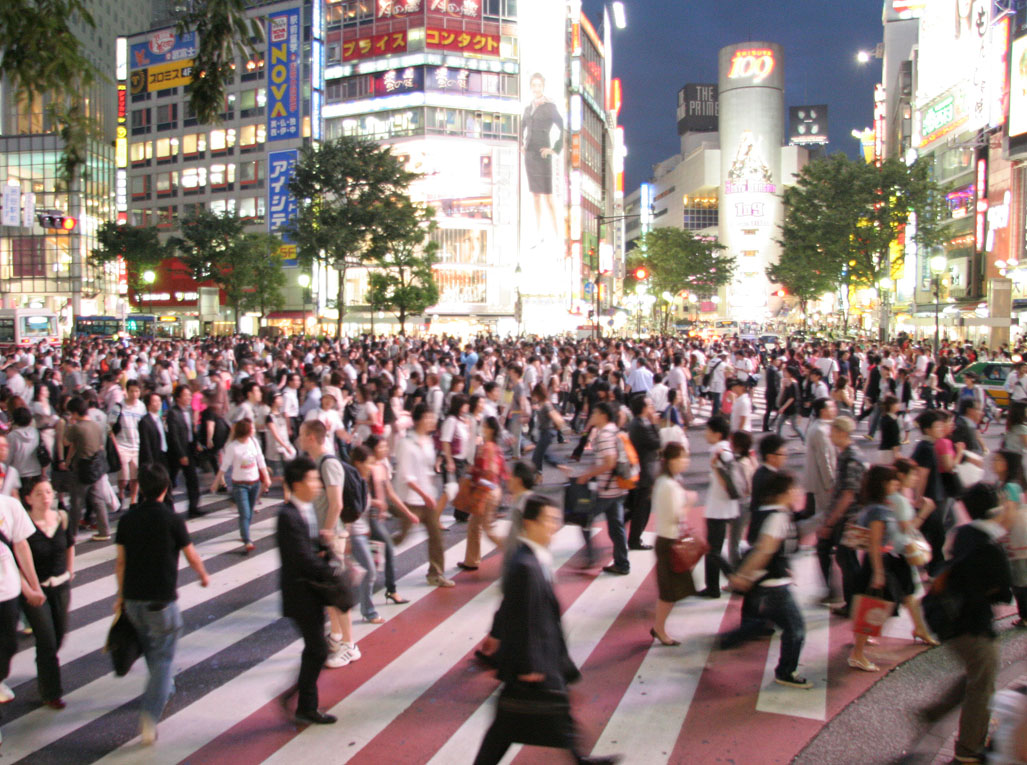
Japan's population is very ethnically homogeneous due to restrictions on immigration.

==== Japan ====
To help cope with a labor shortage, Japan allowed additional immigrants of Japanese ancestry into the country in the early 1990s. According to Japanese immigration centre, the number of foreign residents in Japan has steadily increased, and the number of foreign residents (including permanent residents, but excluding illegal immigrants and short-term visitors such as foreign nationals staying less than 90 days in Japan) was more than 2.2 million in 2008. The biggest groups are Koreans (both south and north), Chinese (including China, Taiwan, Hong Kong, Macau nationalities), and Brazilians. Most of the Brazilians in Japan have Japanese ancestry due to the huge Japanese immigration to Brazil in the first decades of the 20th century. Immediately after World War II, most Koreans in Japan were illegal immigrants who escaped from civil war on the Korean Peninsula. Japan accepted 8,646 persons as naturalised citizens in 2013, down from 10,622 the previous year. The definition of "ethnic groups" used in Japanese statistics is different from that used in North American or some Western European statistics. For example, the United Kingdom Census asks about its citizens' "ethnic or racial background". The Japanese Statistics Bureau does not ask this question. Since the Japanese census asks about nationality rather than ethnicity, naturalised Japanese citizens and Japanese nationals with multi-ethnic backgrounds are considered simply to be Japanese in the population of Japan. According to the Japanese Association for Refugees, the number of refugees who applied to live in Japan has rapidly increased since 2006, and there were more than a thousand applications in 2008. Japan's refugee policy has been criticised because the number of refugees accepted into Japan is small compared to countries such as Sweden and the United States. In 2013, Japan accepted only six of 3,777 persons who applied for refugee status.

=== Africa ===
==== Morocco ====
Morocco is home to more than 46,000 sub-Saharan African immigrants. Most of the foreign residents are French or Spanish. Prior to independence, Morocco was home to half a million Europeans.

=== Europe ===
According to Eurostat, 47.3 million people lived in the EU in 2010, who were born outside their resident country. This corresponds to 9.4% of the total EU population. Of these, 31.4 million (6.3%) were born outside the EU and 16.0 million (3.2%) were born in another EU member state. The largest absolute numbers of people born outside the EU were in Germany (6.4 million), France (5.1 million), the United Kingdom (4.7 million), Spain (4.1 million), Italy (3.2 million), and the Netherlands (1.4 million).

Some EU member states are currently receiving large-scale immigration: for instance Spain, where the economy has created more than half of all new jobs in the EU over the past five years. The EU, in 2005, had an overall net gain from international migration of +1.8 million people. This accounts for almost 85% of Europe's total population growth in 2005. In 2004, total 140,033 people immigrated to France. Of them, 90,250 were from Africa and 13,710 from Europe. In 2005, immigration fell slightly to 135,890. British emigration towards Southern Europe is of special relevance. Citizens from the European Union make up a growing proportion of immigrants in Spain. They mainly come from countries like the UK and Germany, but the British case is of special interest due to its magnitude. The British authorities estimate that the British population in Spain at 700,000.

Mid- and long term EU demographics indicate a shortage of skilled laborers on a scale that would endanger economic growth and the stability of numerous industries. For this reason the European Union launched an initiative called the EU Blue Card, In 2009. The EU Blue Card is initially a temporary residence and work permit. It will offer holders the opportunity to apply for a permanent resident permit after working on an EU Blue Card for two to five years uninterrupted, depending on individual member state regulations.

==== Italy ====
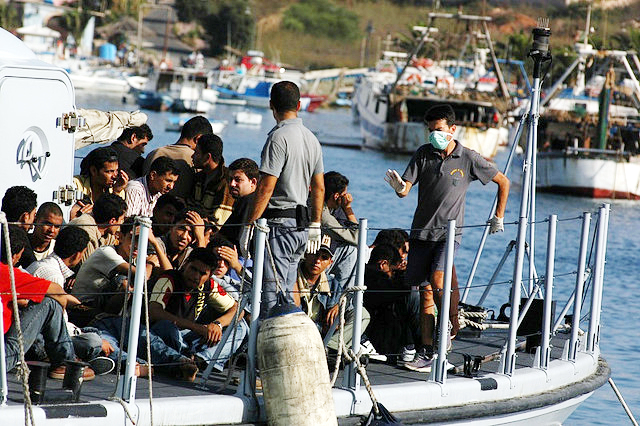
Immigrants to Europe have entered by boat to the Italian island of Lampedusa

Italy now has an estimated 4 million to 4.5 million immigrants — about 8 per cent of the population. Since the expansion of the European Union, the most recent wave of migration has been from surrounding European nations, particularly Central Europe, and increasingly Asia, replacing North Africa as the major immigration area. Some 997,000 Romanians are officially registered as living in Italy, replacing Albanians (590,000) and Moroccans (455,000) as the largest ethnic minority group, but independent estimates put the actual number of Romanians at double that figure or perhaps even more. Other immigrants from Central and Eastern Europe are Ukrainians (260,000), Polish (120,000), Moldovans (190 000) Macedonians (100,000), Serbs (75,000), Bulgarians (124,000), Bosnians (40,000), Russians (50,000), Croatians (25,000), Slovaks (12,000), Hungarians (12,000).

As of 2009, the foreign born population origin of Italy was subdivided as follows: Europe (53.5%), Africa (22.3%), Asia (15.8%), the Americas (8.1%) and Oceania (0.06%). The distribution of foreign born population is largely uneven in Italy: 80% of immigrants live in the northern and central parts of the country (the most economically developed areas), while only 20% live in the southern half of the peninsula. In 2008, net immigration to Italy was 47,000.

==== Norway ====
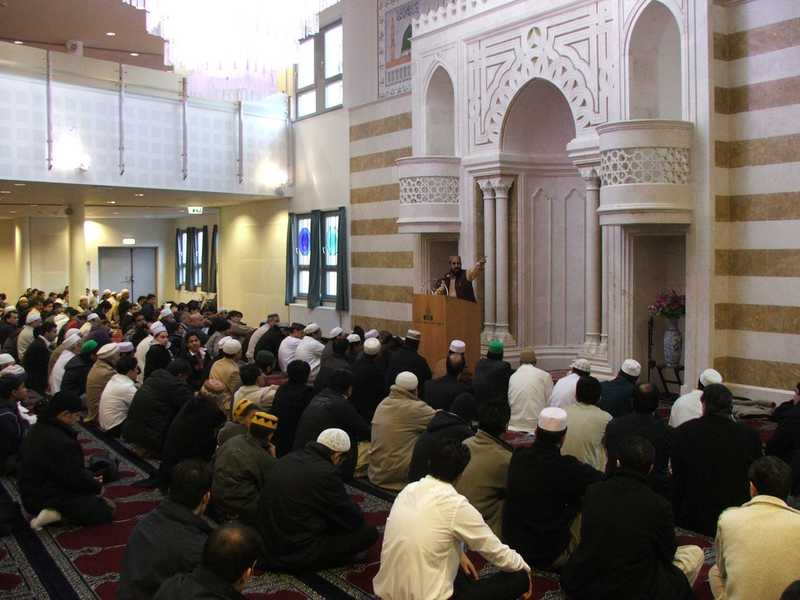
Immigration to Norway has increased the amount of religious minorities, such as these Muslims in Oslo

Pr. 1 January 2012 registered immigrants in Norway numbered 547,000, making up about 11% of the total population. Many are fairly recent immigrants as immigration has gradually increased in Norway and per 2012 is very high, both historically and compared to other countries. Net immigration in 2011 was 47,032, a national record high. The immigrants come from 219 different countries. If children of two immigrants are included the immigrant population make up 655,170. The largest groups come from Poland (72,103), Sweden (36,578), Pakistan (32,737), Somalia (29,395) Iraq (28,935), Germany (25,683), Lithuania (23,941) and Vietnam (20,871) (numbers per 2012, include immigrants and children of two immigrants). Children of Pakistani, Somali and Vietnamese parents made up the largest groups of all Norwegians born to immigrant parents. The European and Pakistani immigrants are mainly labor immigrants while many other immigrants from outside Europe have come as asylum seekers or family members to such.

==== Portugal ====
Portugal, long a country of emigration, that have created big Portuguese communities in France, the United States and Brazil has now become a country of net immigration, and not just from the former colonies; by the end of 2003, legal immigrants represented about 4% of the population, and the largest communities were from Cape Verde, Brazil, Angola, Guinea-Bissau, UK, Spain, China and Ukraine.

==== Spain ====
As of 2010, there were over 6 million foreign-born residents in Spain, corresponding to 14% of the total population. Of these, 4.1 million (8.9% of the total population) were born outside the European Union and 2.3 million (5.1%) were born in another EU Member State. Spain is the most popular European destination for Britons living outside the UK. According to residence permit data for 2005, about 500,000 Moroccans, 500,000 Ecuadorians, more than 200,000 Romanians, and 260,000 Colombians lived in Spain. In 2005 alone, a regularisation programme increased the legal immigrant population by 700,000 people. As a result of the Spanish financial crisis net migration trends reversed and in 2011 more people left Spain than immigrated with 507,740 leaving Spain and only 457,650 arriving.

==== Sweden ====
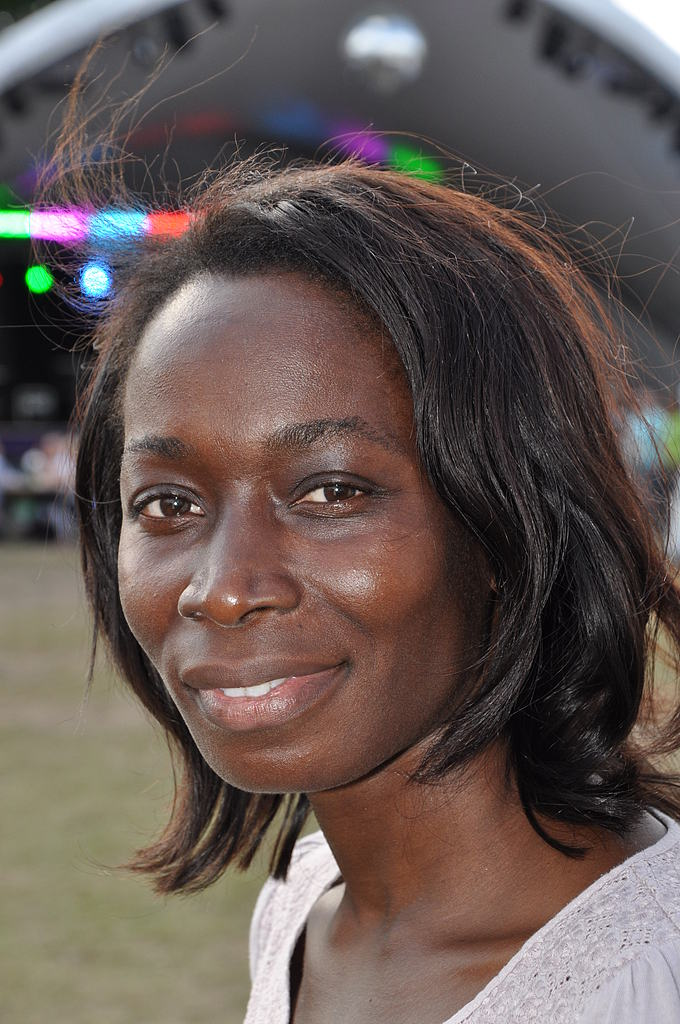
Swedish politician Nyamko Sabuni was born in Burundi and immigrated to Sweden in 1981.

As the Swedish government does not base any statistics on ethnicity, there are no exact numbers on the total number of people of immigrant background in Sweden. As of 2010, 1.33 million people or 14.3% of the inhabitants in Sweden were foreign-born. Sweden has been transformed from a nation of emigration ending after World War I to a nation of immigration from World War II onwards. In 2009, immigration reached its highest level since records began with 102,280 people emigrating to Sweden. In 2010, 32,000 people applied for asylum to Sweden, a 25% increase from 2009, the highest amount in Swedish history.

In 2009, Sweden had the fourth largest number of asylum applications in the EU and the largest number per capita after Cyprus and Malta. Immigrants in Sweden are mostly concentrated in the urban areas of Svealand and Götaland and the five largest foreign born populations in Sweden come from Finland, Yugoslavia, Iraq, Poland and Iran. According to a publication by Mete Feridun in the peer-reviewed Journal of Developing Areas published by the Tennessee State University, immigration has a statistically significant causal impact on economic growth in Sweden.

==== Switzerland ====
As of 2014, 23.4% of Switzerland's population are foreign born (with nearly 40% from Germany). Since the 1970s Switzerland's foreign born population has remained over 15% of the total population. Switzerland and Australia are the two countries with the highest proportion of immigrants in the world. In 2010, Swiss voters approved the deportation of criminal foreigners and in February 2014, the federal popular initiative "against mass immigration" was approved by 50.3% of voters. The referendum aims to reduce immigration through quotas and limits the freedom of movement between Switzerland and the European Union. In 2006 the United Nations special rapporteur on racism, Doudou Diène, observed that Switzerland suffers from racism, discrimination and xenophobia and that Swiss authorities do not view these issues as serious problems.

==== United Kingdom ====
In 2007, net immigration to the UK was 237,000, a rise of 46,000 on 2006. In 2004, the number of people who became British citizens rose to a record 140,795—a rise of 12% on the previous year. This number had risen dramatically since 2000. In the 2001 Census, citizens from the Republic of Ireland were the largest foreign born group and have been for the last 200 years. This figure does not include those from Northern Ireland located since it is part of the United Kingdom. Those of Irish ancestry number roughly 6 million from first, second and third generation. The overwhelming majority of new citizens come from Asia (40%) and Africa (32%), the largest three groups being people from Pakistan, India and Somalia.

In 2011, an estimated 589,000 migrants arrived to live in the UK for at least a year, most of the migrants were people from Asia (particularly the Indian subcontinent) and Africa, while 338,000 people emigrated from the UK for a year or more. Following Poland's entry into the EU in May 2004 it was estimated that by the start of 2007, 375,000 Poles had registered to work in the UK, although the total Polish population in the UK was believed to be 500,000. Many Poles work in seasonal occupations and a large number are likely to move back and forth over time. Some migrants left after the world economic crisis of 2008. In 2011, citizens of the new EU member states made up 13% of the immigrants entering the country. As of May 2010 the UK Immigration Minister was Damian Green, who has since been replaced by Mark Harper.

The British Asian (South Asian) population has increased from 2.2 million in 2001 to over 4.2 million in 2011, while the Black British community has increased from 1.1 million in 2001 to nearly 1.9 million in 2011. Between 2001 and 2009, this was part of a general trend seeing a drop in white British people by 36,000 and a concurrent rise in non-white British people from 6.64 million to 9.13 million, including Indian, Chinese, Pakistani, mixed white and black Caribbean, black African, Australian, Canadian and European immigrants.

London has the largest immigrant population.

=== North America ===
==== Mexico ====
Large numbers of Central American migrants who have crossed Guatemala's border into Mexico are deported every year. Over 200,000 undocumented Central American migrants were deported in 2005 alone. In a 2010 news story, USA Today reported, "... Mexico's Arizona-style law requires local police to check IDs. And Mexican police freely engage in racial profiling and routinely harass Central American migrants, say immigration activists."

After the United States returned to a more closed border, immigration has been more difficult than ever for Mexican residents hoping to migrate. Mexico is the leading country of migrants to the U.S.. A Mexican Repatriation program was founded by the United States government to encourage people to voluntarily move to Mexico. However, the program was not found successful and many immigrants were deported against their will. In 2010, there was a total of 139,120 legal immigrants who migrated to the United States. This put Mexico as the top country for emigration. In subsequent years China and India have surpassed Mexico as the top sources of immigrants to the United States, and since 2009 there has been a net decline in the number of Mexicans living in the US.

==== Canada ====
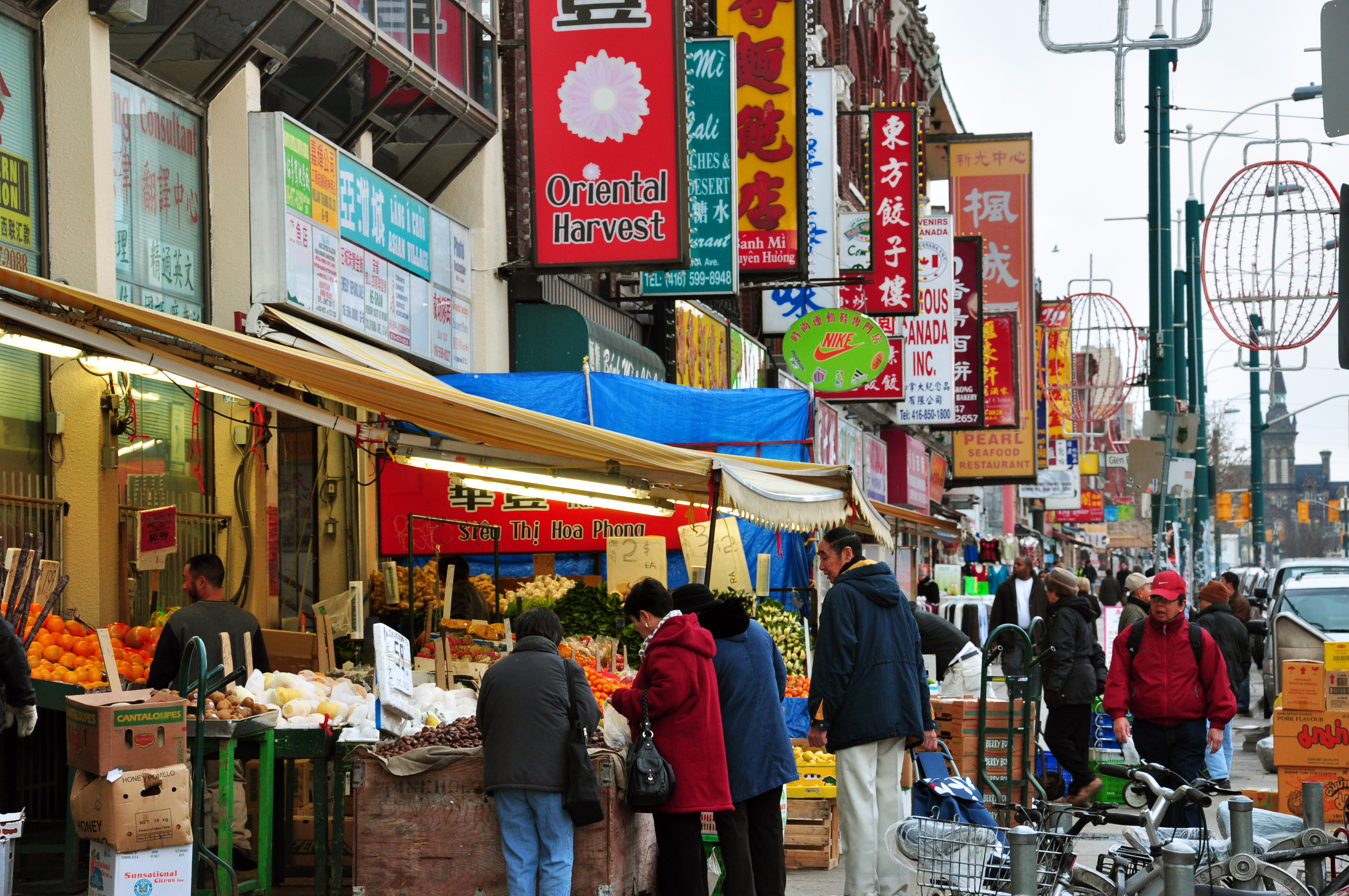
Chinatown in downtown Toronto, Ontario, 2009

Between 2000 and 2014, Canada accepted 200,000 to 271,000 immigrants per year, mainly from three categories: skilled workers, people with family members already in the country, and humanitarian cases. In 2019, 1 in 5 Canadians was an immigrant. Since the 1990s, the majority of immigrants have come from Asia. The leading emigrating countries were China, Philippines and India. India was the third largest source country for immigration to Canada in 2012. Newcomers tend to settle in the major urban areas of Toronto, Montreal and Vancouver. After Justin Trudeau became Prime Minister in 2015, he increased immigration targets. Population and housing prices rose more in Canada than in any other G7 country. In 2022, a record 400,000 immigrants and 600,000 non-permanent residents, were admitted. Trudeau acknowledged Canada does not have enough housing supply to reflect the dramatic increase in population growth (demand), and despite years of funding, strategies and initiatives, several cities across Canada have declared States of Emergency on Homelessness as of April 2023. Although housing and service concerns have been raised, Trudeau plans to increase the number of immigrants to 465,000 in 2023 and up to 500,000 by 2025, saying the higher targets are necessary to ensure economic prosperity. The new targets were recommended by the Advisory Council on Economic Growth established by the Liberal government in December 2015.

Political parties in Canada are cautious about criticising the level of immigration, because, as noted by The Globe and Mail, "in the early 1990s, the old Reform Party was branded 'racist' for suggesting that immigration levels be lowered from 250,000 to 150,000." A Leger poll in 2019 indicated that the majority of Canadians (63%) thought immigration should be limited as they worried about housing and other infrastructure shortages, as well as the impact on the environment. The Minister of Immigration, Refugees and Citizenship, at that time, Ahmed Hussen, said his department planned to share 'positive stories of newcomers...to keep public attitudes from turning against immigrants'. Hussen also accused the Opposition leader of 'misinformation and fear-mongering' about immigrants.

According to a study released in October 2023, immigrants were leaving Canada in record numbers due to the high cost of living and for better economic opportunities abroad, among other reasons.

==== United States ====
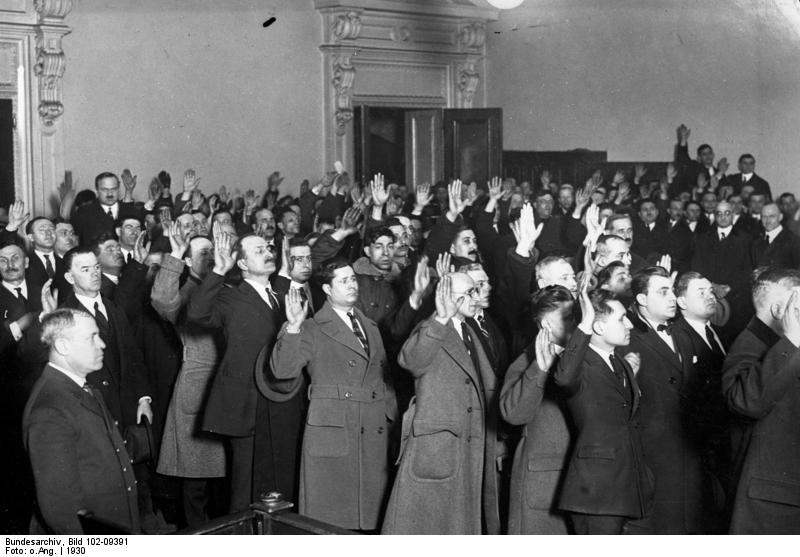
Naturalisation ceremony in New York City, 1930

Historians estimate that fewer than 1 million immigrants came to the United States from Europe during the 17th and 18th centuries. Around 350,000 came from England between 1600 and 1699, and 80,000 more between 1700 and 1775. In addition, between the 17th and 19th centuries, an estimated 645,000 Africans were brought to what is now the United States. In the early years of the United States, immigration was fewer than 8,000 people a year. After 1820, immigration gradually increased. From 1850 to 1930, the foreign born population of the United States increased from 2.2 million to 14.2 million. The highest percentage of foreign born people in the United States was found in this period, with the peak in 1890 at 14.7% (compared to 13% in 2009). During this time, the lower costs of Atlantic Ocean travel in time and fare made it more advantageous for immigrants to move to the U.S. than in years prior. From 1880 to 1924, over 25 million Europeans migrated to the United States, mainly economic migrants. The 1882, Chinese Exclusion Act meanwhile suppressed immigration from East Asia, while the Emergency Quota Act, followed by the Immigration Act of 1924, restricted immigration from Southern and Eastern Europe.

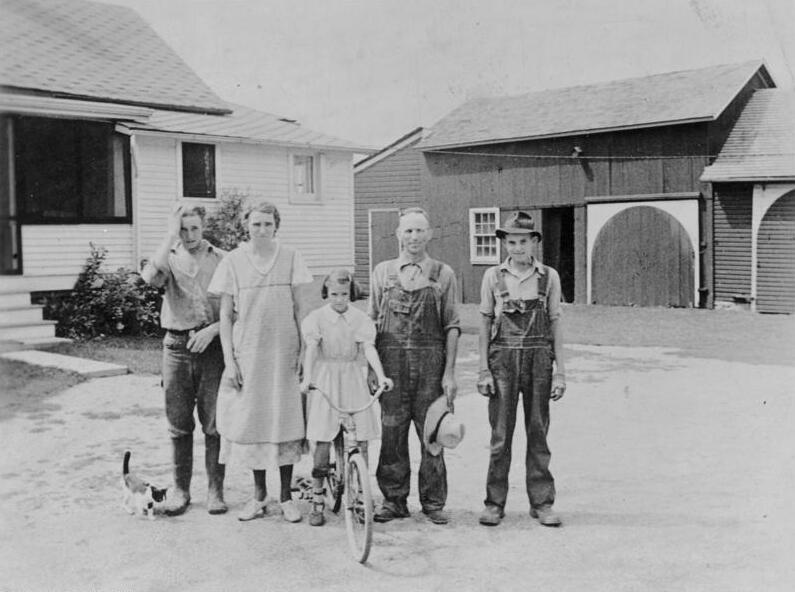
German immigrant family in the United States, 1930

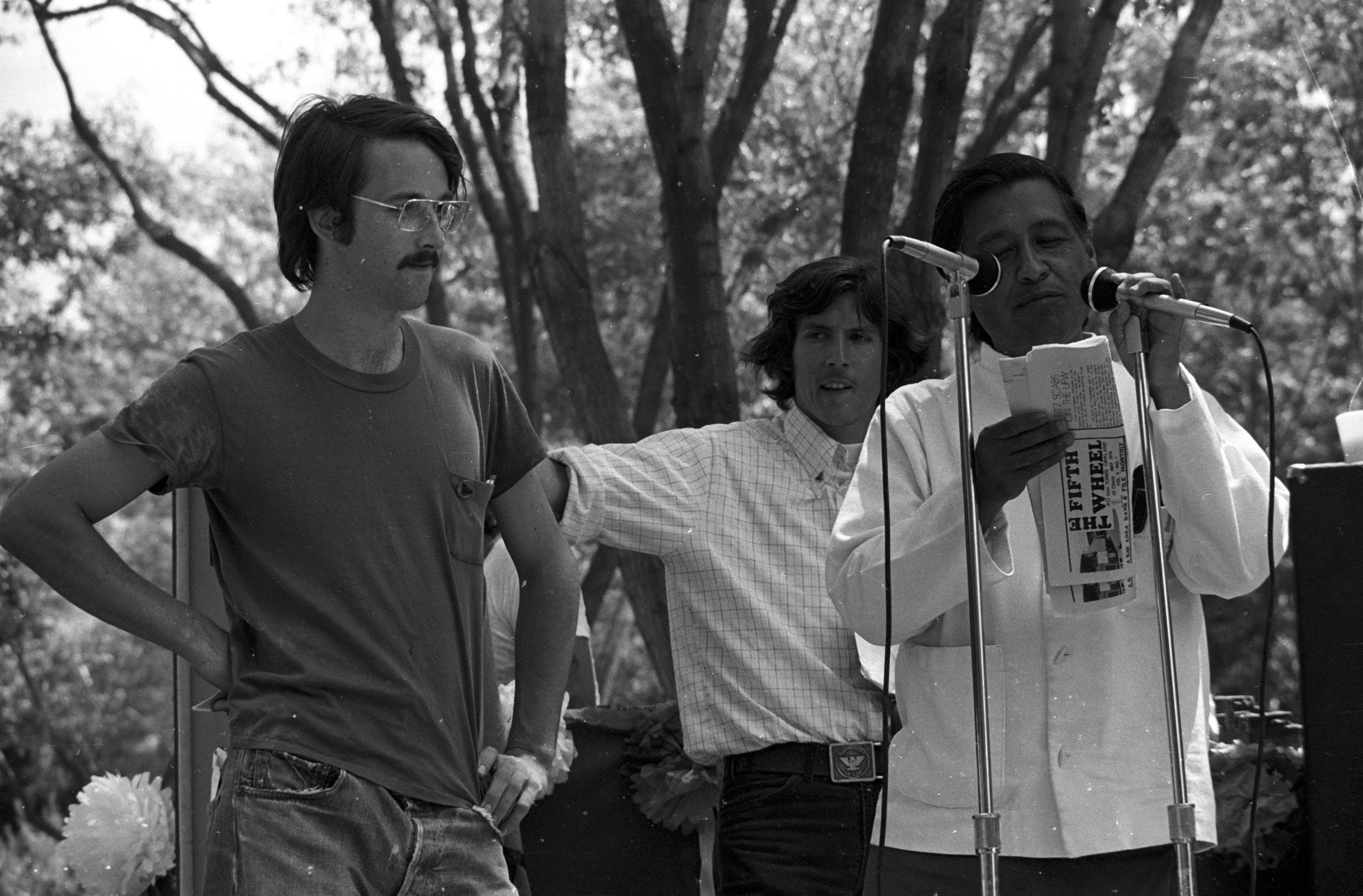
Cesar Chavez speaking at a 1974 United Farm Workers rally in California. The UFW during Chavez's tenure was committed to restricting immigration.

Following this time period, immigration fell because in 1924 Congress passed the Immigration Act of 1924, which favoured immigrant source countries that already had many immigrants in the U.S. by 1890. Immigration patterns of the 1930s were dominated by the Great Depression, and in the early 1930s, more people emigrated from the United States than immigrated to it. Immigration continued to fall throughout the 1940s and 1950s, but it increased again afterwards.

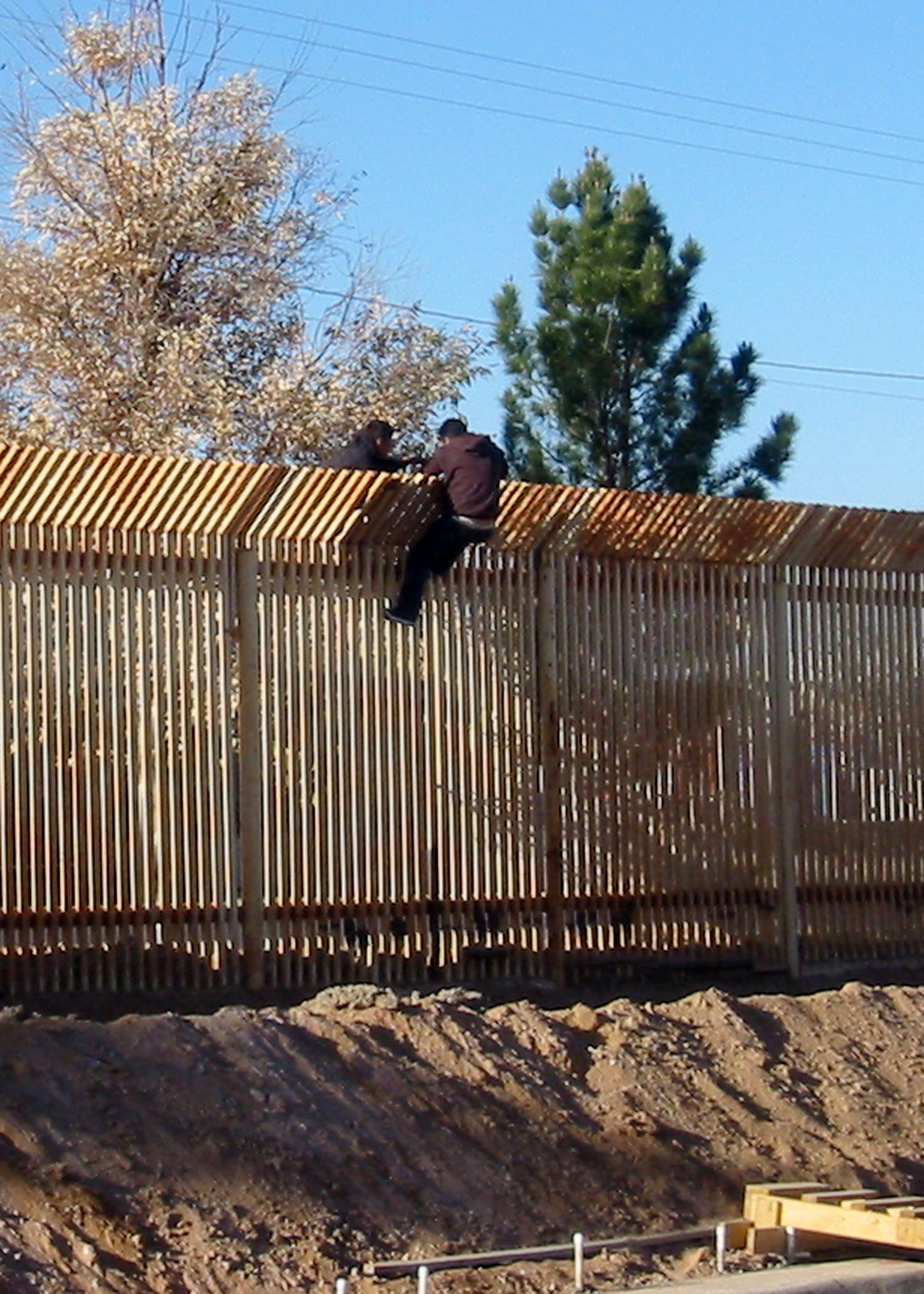
The Mexico–U.S. border in Arizona.

Immigration and Nationality Act of 1952 or McCarran–Walter Act brought in major changes to immigration policy and the act removed the immigration restrictions based on race and sex/gender, ending the decades of repression levied upon Chinese immigrants and other Asian immigrant groups. The McCarran-Walter act retained national origin immigration quotas.

The Immigration and Nationality Act Amendments of 1965 (the Hart–Cellar Act) removed quotas on large segments of the immigration flow and legal immigration to the U.S. surged. In 2006, the number of immigrants totaled record 37.5 million. After 2000, immigration to the United States numbered approximately 1,000,000 per year. Nearly 8 million people immigrated to the United States from 2000 to 2005. Almost half entered illegally. In 2006, 1.27 million immigrants were granted legal residence. Mexico has been the leading source of new U.S. residents for over two decades; and since 1998, China, India and the Philippines have been in the top four sending countries every year. The U.S. has often been called the "melting pot" (derived from Carl N. Degler, a historian, author of Out of Our Past), a name derived from United States' rich tradition of immigrants coming to the US looking for something better and having their cultures melded and incorporated into the fabric of the country.

Appointed by President Clinton, the U.S. Commission on Immigration Reform recommended in 1997 that legal immigration be reduced to about 550,000 a year. Since 11 September 2001, the politics of immigration has become an extremely hot issue. It was a central topic of the 2008 election cycle.

U.S. immigration law distinguishes between "immigrants" who become lawful permanent residents and "nonimmigrants" who may remain lawfully in the U.S. for years, but who do not obtain permanent resident status. Since World War II, more refugees have found homes in the U.S. than any other nation and more than two million refugees have arrived in the U.S. since 1980. Of the top ten countries accepting resettled refugees in 2006, the United States accepted more than twice as much as the next nine countries combined. One econometrics report in 2010 by analyst Kusum Mundra suggested that immigration positively affected bilateral trade when the U.S. had a networked community of immigrants, but that the trade benefit was weakened when the immigrants became assimilated into American culture.

The table above does not include the years 2011 and 2012. The number of "immigrant" visas available each year is set by Congress. Nationals of countries that do not historically send many immigrants to the United States are eligible to apply for the Diversity Visa Lottery. According to Permanent residence (United States), in 2011 there were 2.7 million entries entered in the Diversity Visa Lottery. So far in 2012, there has been 19.6 million participants. The numbers increase tremendously each year.

=== Oceania ===
==== Australia ====
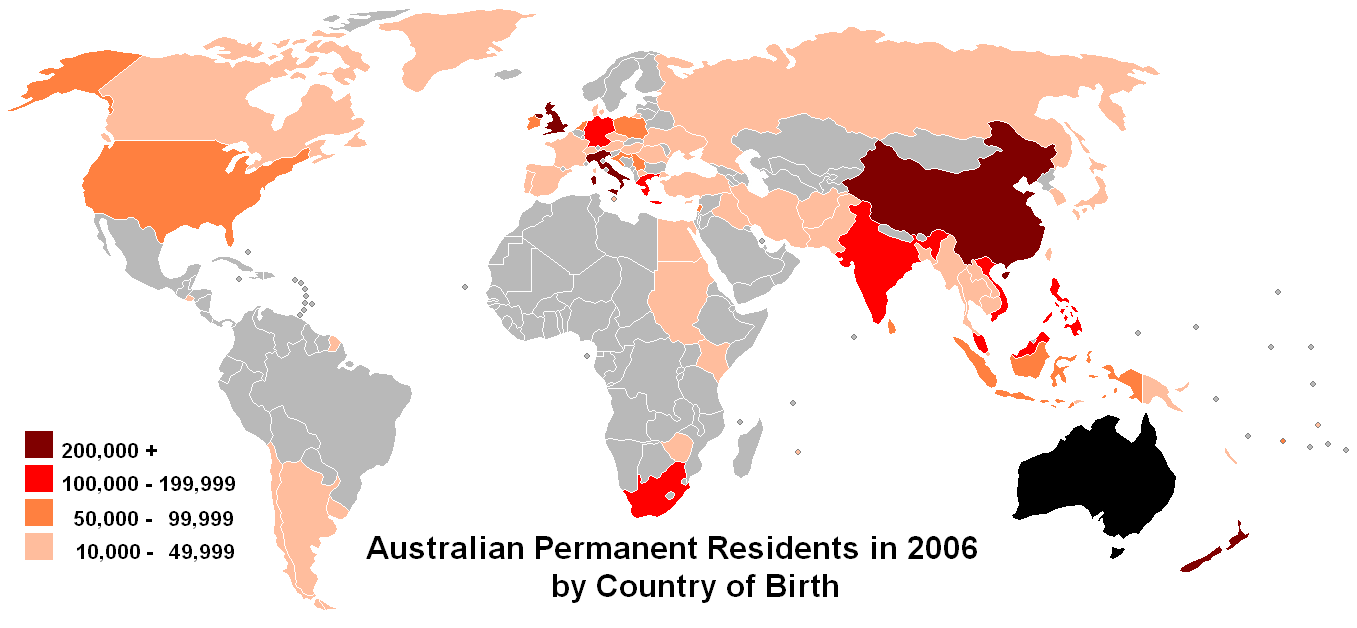
Countries of birth of Australian estimated resident population (Australian Bureau of Statistics, 2006).

The overall level of immigration to Australia has grown substantially during the last decade. Net overseas migration increased from 30,000 in 1993 to 118,000 in 2003–04. The largest components of immigration are the skilled migration and family re-union programs. The mandatory detention of unauthorised arrivals by boat has generated great levels of controversy. During 2004–05, a total of 123,424 people immigrated to Australia. Of them, 17,736 were from Africa, 54,804 from Asia, 21,131 from Oceania, 18,220 from United Kingdom, 1,506 from South America, and 2,369 from the rest of Europe. 131,000 people migrated to Australia in 2005-06 and migration target for 2012–13 is 190,000.

Australia and Switzerland, with about a quarter of their population born outside the country, are the two countries with the highest proportion of immigrants in the world.

==== New Zealand ====
New Zealand has relatively open immigration policies. 23% of the population was born overseas, mainly in Asia, Oceania, and the UK, one of the highest rates in the world.

== See also ==
- Human migration
- Women migrant workers from developing countries
- Immigration and crime
- Immigration country
- Immigration reform
- Multiculturalism
- Opposition to immigration
- People smuggling
- Replacement migration
- Right of foreigners to vote
- List of sovereign states by net migration rate
