= Hai Lam =

Hai Lam can refer to

- Hai Lam (footballer), Norwegian footballer
- Hai (video gamer), American League of Legends player
- Hai Lam (video gamer), a Dutch pro game player who plays legendary
