= Norwegian Vietnamese =

Vietnamese in Norway
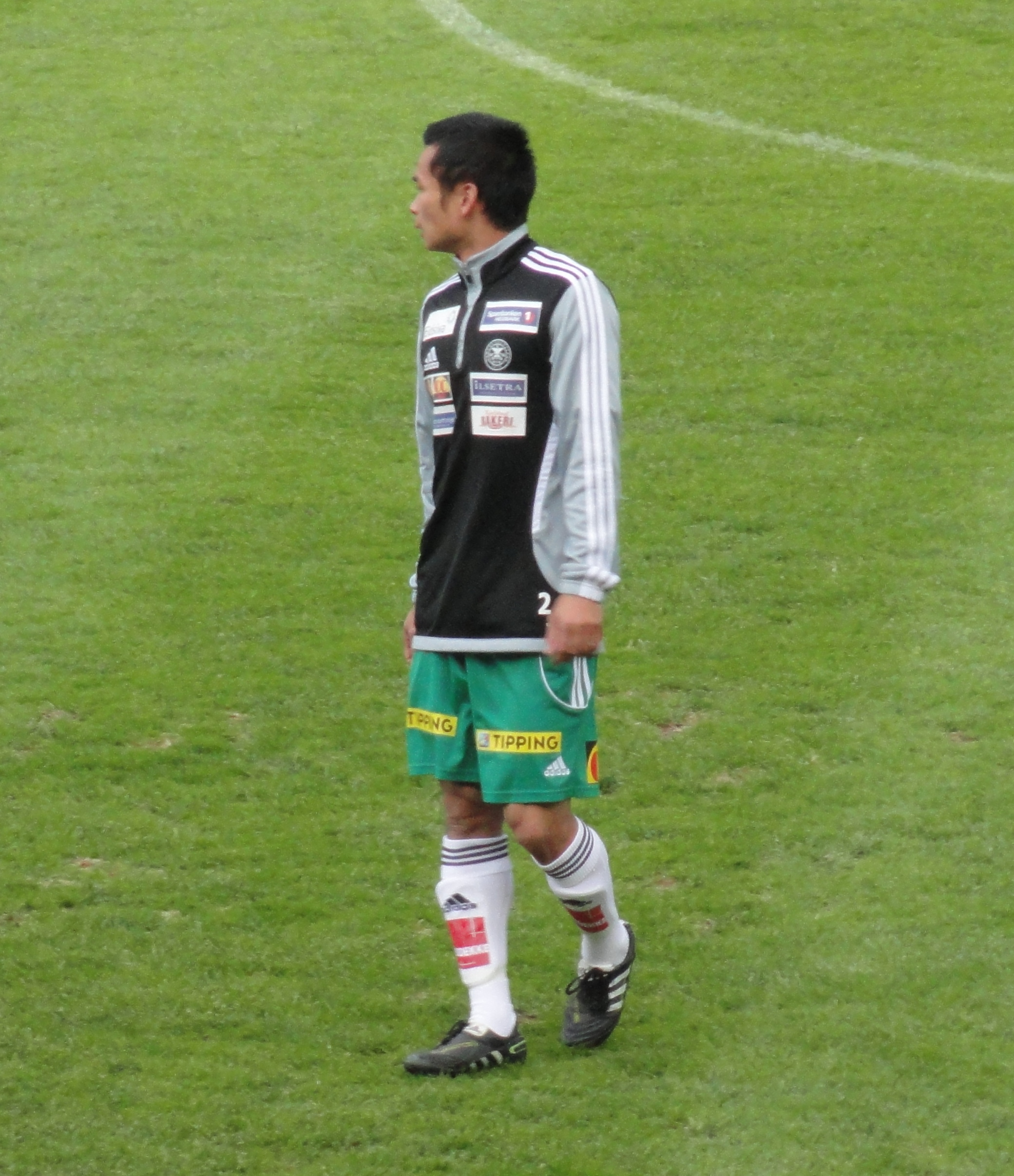
Hai Lam

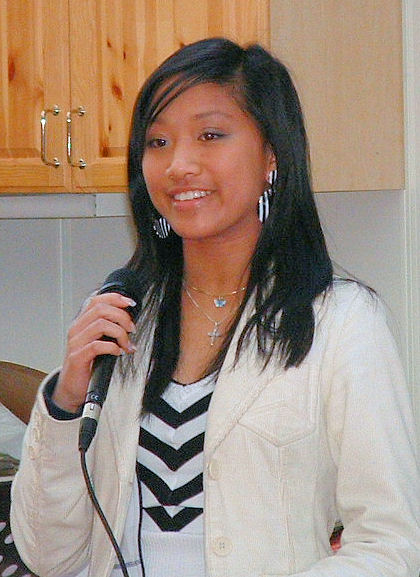
Anh Vu

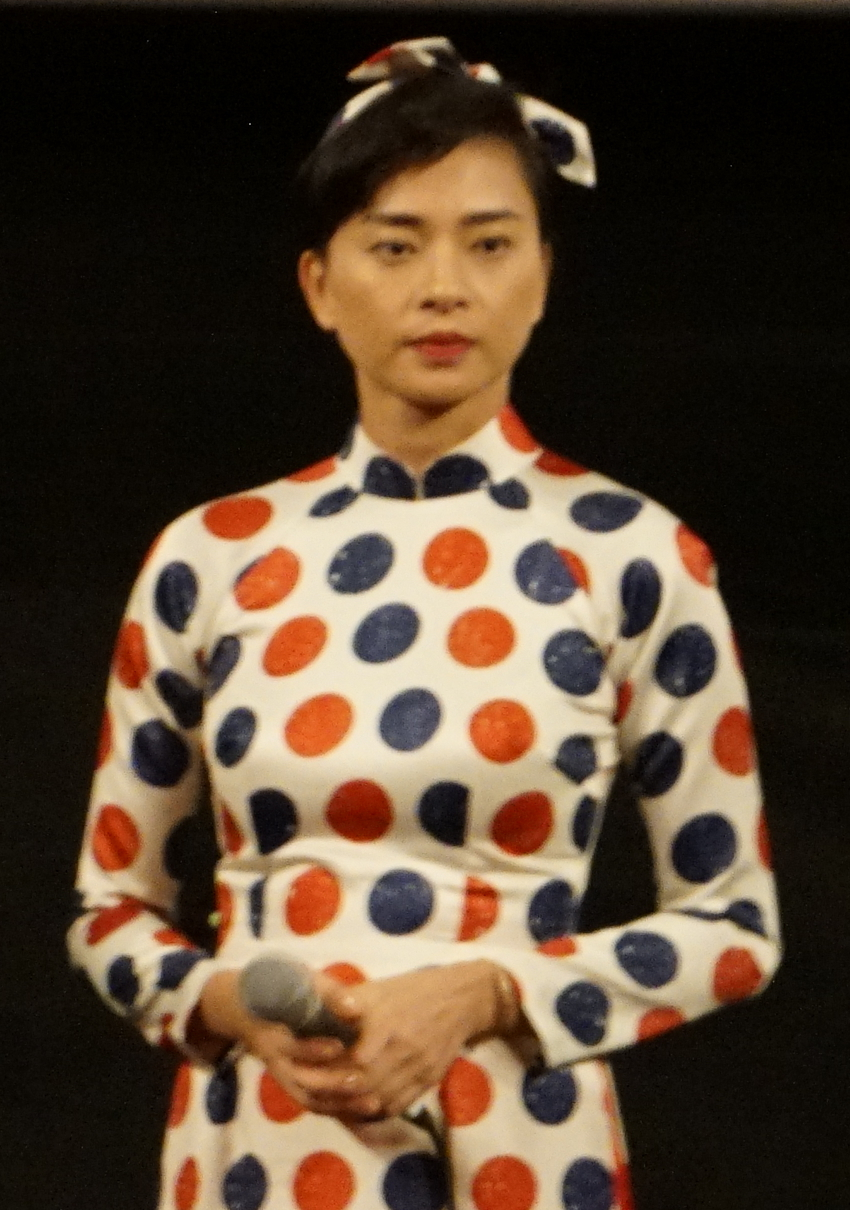
Ngô Thanh Vân

Total population
- 23,313 (2019 Official Norway estimate) 0.44% of the Norwegian population

Regions with significant populations
- Oslo, Bergen, Kristiansand, Trondheim, Stavanger, Moss, Drammen

Languages
- Vietnamese, Norwegian

Religion
- Predominantly Vietnamese folk religion and Mahayana Buddhism with Ancestor Worship, and Roman Catholicism

Related ethnic groups
- Vietnamese people, Overseas Vietnamese

Norwegian Vietnamese or Vietnamese Norwegian refers to citizens or naturalized residents of Norway of partial and full Vietnamese descent.

When this article describes Vietnamese living in Norway, it primarily means persons with two parents born in Vietnam. Thus, statistics used in this article do not include Vietnamese-descended persons with only one parent, or no parents born in Vietnam.

== History ==
The first waves of Vietnamese immigrants to Norway came after the Fall of Saigon, in 1975. They escaped Vietnam by boat, and were also known as the boat people. Some were picked up by Norwegian cargo ships and came to Norway after spending time in refugee camps in East Asia and Southeast Asia and were processed through interviews by the United Nations High Commissioner for Refugees. Most of these migrants came in the period from 1978 to 1985. Later immigrants have come for family reunification and economic reasons.

== Demographics ==
On January 1, 2017, the Norwegian Statistisk Sentralbyrå reported that there were 22,658 Vietnamese people in Norway. Vietnamese Norwegians were the fourth-largest immigrant group from outside Europe after Pakistanis, Somalis and Iraqis.

The Vietnamese were among the first from the developing world to immigrate to Norway. Eight out of ten Vietnamese have lived in Norway for more than ten years, and nine out of ten possess Norwegian citizenship.

=== Settlement ===
Around 6,000 Vietnamese Norwegians live in Oslo (around 27% of the Vietnamese population in Norway), where they are the eleventh-largest immigrant group. There are also significant groups of Vietnamese living in the cities of Bergen, Kristiansand, and Trondheim.

Number of immigrant with Vietnamese background in some municipalities 1 January 2008

== Cultural profile ==
=== Education ===
Vietnamese culture places an emphasis on education. Even though the elder first generation immigrants in the age of 30 to 44 often do not have a higher education, the second generation, and the younger first-generation immigrants from 19 to 24 years old, generally have a much higher level of education. A 2012 study found that Vietnamese Norwegians—both those born in Norway, and the foreign-born—had slightly better grades than ethnic Norwegians in secondary school despite their parents having lower levels of education. A survey from 2006 reported that 88 percent of Vietnamese finished upper secondary school, the same percentage as ethnic Norwegians. A 2006 survey also showed that Vietnamese students had the highest grades in upper secondary school among the ten largest non-western immigrant groups in Norway, averaging similar grades as Norwegians.

A 2006 survey showed that the Vietnamese ethnic group had the fourth highest percentage who finished a bachelor degree (after Indians, Chinese, and Norwegians) and the third highest percentage who finished a master's degree. The Vietnamese tend to be well-represented in higher education, as there is a 10 percent greater chance for a Vietnamese-Norwegian having finished higher education than Norwegians.

=== Politics ===
Vietnamese in Norway have historically not been active in the country's politics. As of December 2006, there was only one Vietnamese on a municipal council in Norway. At the municipal- and county election (kommune- og fylkestingsvalg) in 2003, only 30 percent of Vietnamese-Norwegians voted. It has been pointed out that though the voting percentage of elder Vietnamese (40 to 59 years old) at 51% is relatively high—compared to other non-Western immigrant groups of the same age (44%)—it is the younger generation of Vietnamese Norwegians that pull the numbers down. In 2003, only 17% of the Vietnamese Norwegians in the age groups between 18 and 25, and 22% between 26 and 39, voted.

=== Attachments to home country ===
As a result of most Vietnamese coming to Norway as political or war refugees fleeing communist Vietnam, they are generally critical of the Vietnamese government. Fleeing the country was viewed as treason by the Vietnamese government during the 1970s and 1980s. However, the trend has turned and Vietnam now view the overseas Vietnamese as assets to the country's rapidly growing economy.

The Vietnamese are one of the immigrant groups in Norway that send the most remittance money to families in their home country. Over 60% of those who came to the country as adults reported regularly sending money home to their families. The number among those Vietnamese-born or having arrived in the country at a young regularly sending money to Vietnam were over 40%. The Vietnamese having come to Norway as adults send more money the longer they have stayed in their new country.

=== Issues ===
Though widely perceived as one of the best integrated non-Western immigrant groups, there still remain some challenges for the Vietnamese community in Norway. In 2005, a social anthropologist studying said there are cases of those not succeeding in school falling into delinquency.

==== Psychological problems ====
Many Vietnamese, especially among the older generation, have experienced traumas during and after the Vietnam War. A survey conducted on 148 randomly chosen Vietnamese refugees, for up to three years after arriving in Norway, showed that many of them had experienced the war and its impacts up close.

== See also ==
- Norwegian people
- Vietnamese people
- Vietnamese people in Denmark
- Vietnamese people in Finland
- Vietnamese people in Sweden
