= Finland–Vietnam relations =

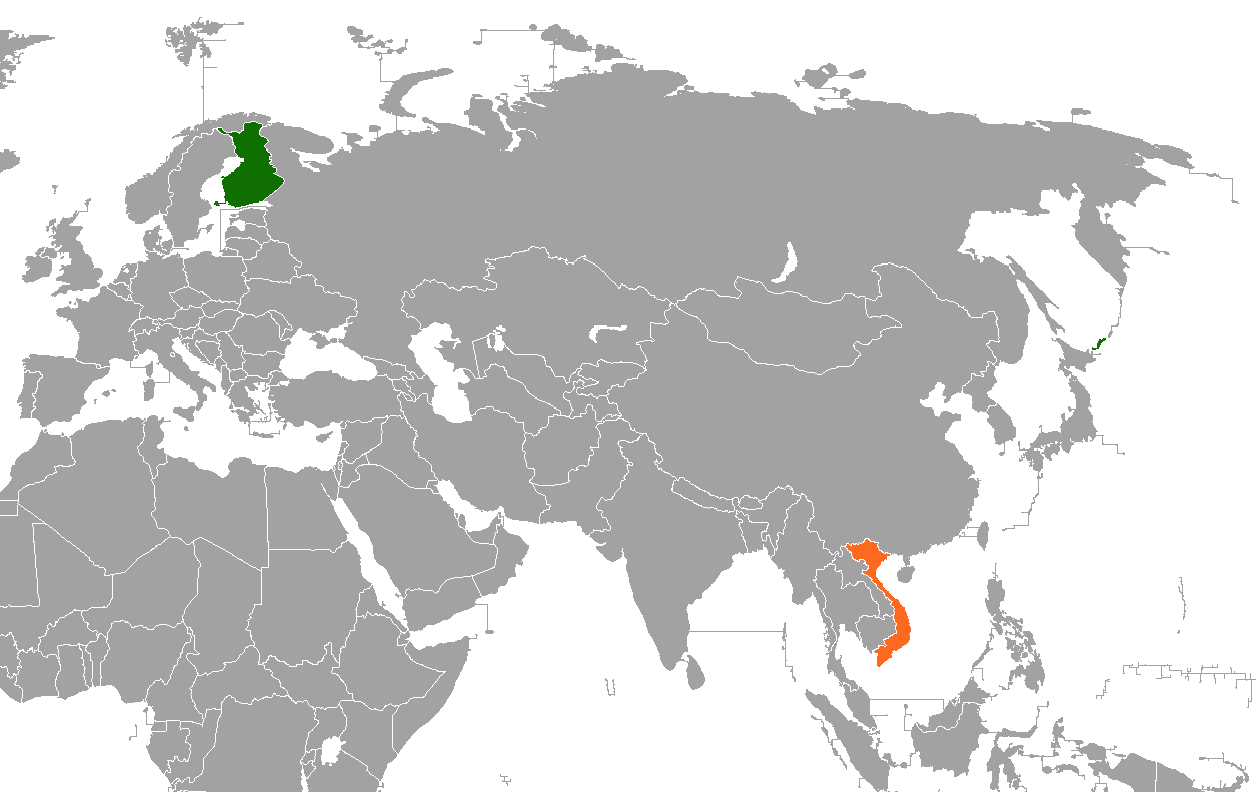
- Finland: Vietnam

Finland and Vietnam have established their official relations in January 1973. Finland has an embassy in Hanoi and a consulate in Ho Chi Minh City, while Vietnam has an embassy in Helsinki.

== History ==
The two countries established formal ties in January 1973.

There are also some similarities in the policies used by both governments when it comes to relations with their large neighbours, Russia and China. Finland's Paasikivi–Kekkonen doctrine and Vietnam's Three Nos principle are both used to enforce neutrality to avoid provocation whilst at the same time seek to engage with Western nations that could oppose Russia and China's ambitions.

== Educational relations ==
Finland has a reputation for providing one of the best education systems in the world, which the Vietnamese officials have long sought to study and emulate. There is a Finnish school in Ho Chi Minh City, which offers a Finnish-style education. There are also a huge number of Vietnamese students choosing to study in Finland.

== Economic relations ==
Vietnam and Finland are also keen on boosting trade relations; bilateral trade turnover rose by 61.2% year-on-year to US$285 million in the first six months of 2021, despite the COVID-19 pandemic.

== Resident diplomatic missions ==
- Finland has an embassy in Hanoi.
- Vietnam has an embassy in Helsinki.
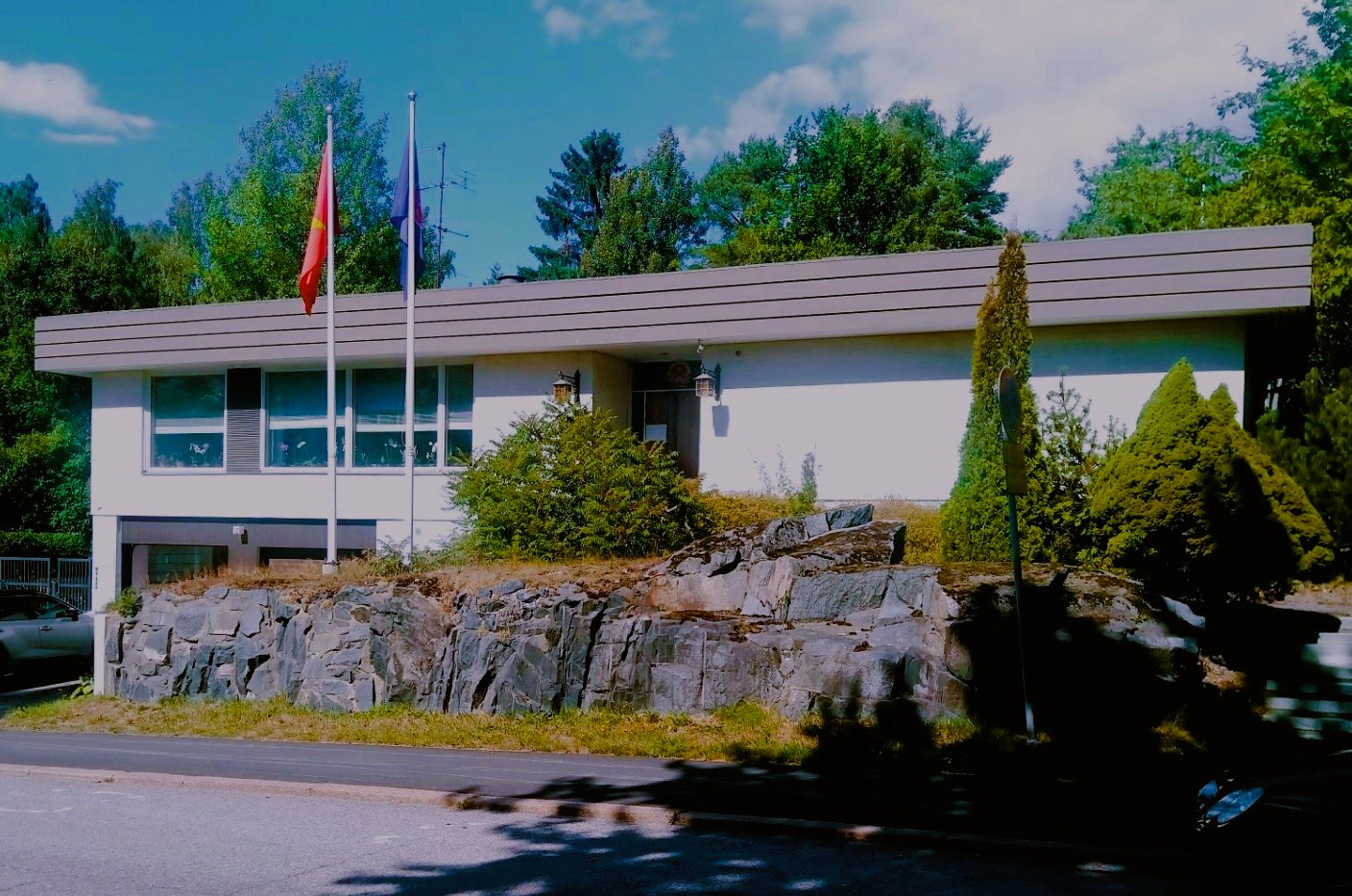
Embassy of Vietnam in Helsinki

== See also ==
- Foreign relations of Finland
- Foreign relations of Vietnam
- Vietnamese people in Finland
