= Jaya Ho =

Song written in Hindi

Jaya Ho

Jaya ho (Victory)
We come before thee, O Great and Holy.
We bow our heads to thee, Great and Holy.
Low at thy feet we bow in quiet reverence,
then sing thy praises, evermore repeating.

"Jaya Ho" is a Christian hymn written in the Hindi language by an unknown author. The song's Hindi title, more frequently transliterated "Jai ho" in other contexts, means "may there be victory" and is frequently used interjectively to praise God. The hymn's English title is often given as "Victory Hymn" or "Victory Be to You [i.e., God]".

The hymn was popularized in the United States by Indian-born composer Victor C. Sherring. He led the group Centennial Choir of India, which performed the song in concerts and prayer services in 70 American cities from 1955–1956 to celebrate the centennial of Methodist missions in the United States. "Jaya Ho" was translated into English by Katherine R. Rohrbough in 1958. Scholars of sacred music have considered the hymn to be a praising of God and a celebration of victory in Jesus Christ.

== History ==
Victor C. Sherring, a composer who popularized the song, was born in 1919 in Kanpur, Uttar Pradesh, India, and attended Methodist schools in his youth. (Note: Sherring attended university in the United States. In 1941, he graduated from Southwestern College in Winfield, Kansas. In 1945, he graduated from Garrett–Evangelical Theological Seminary in Evanston, Illinois. Afterwards, he traveled back to his birthplace in India where he taught at Howard Plested Girls' Intermediate College.) As the Centennial Choir of India director, he delivered "Jaya Ho" to the United States. From 1955–1956, in commemoration of the centennial of Methodist missions in the United States, the Centennial Choir sang the hymn during their tour of 70 cities, where they performed at prayer assemblies and concerts. "Jaya Ho", Sherring wrote, was "first included in" Songs of Joy from India, an anthology of songs printed by The Centenary Music Committee in 1955–1956 in both Indian and Western musical notation.

Composed in the Hindi language by an anonymous author, the hymn was translated into English by Katherine R. Rohrbough in 1958. I-to Loh performed the phonetic transcription in 1988. "Jaya Ho"'s Hindi title is translated as "Victory Hymn" or "Victory be to you".

Translated into English, it appears as hymn number 478 in the 1989 edition of The United Methodist Hymnal and as hymn number 252 in the 1996 edition of Voices United, the hymn and worship book of the United Church of Canada.

== Textual analysis ==
"Jaya Ho" originated from folk music in northern India. Taiwanese ethnomusicologist I-to Loh, whom Perkins School of Theology professor C. Michael Hawn called the "foremost scholar on Asian hymnody", said the first phrase of the song, "Jaya ho", is the "most common phrase for praising God in the Indian subcontinent, with only slight variations". The Linguistic Association of Canada and the United States called "Jaya ho" an "exotic melody line". The association noted that while the song's beginning refrain is in Hindi, the song's remaining verses are in English.

Loh interpreted "Low at thy feet we bow in quiet reverence", the song's second stanza, to be "a contextual expression of utmost reverence in front of the Holy One". It urges God to grant the worshiper "forgiveness, vision, and protection". Professor of sacred music Hawn stated that the song's verses are enveloped by an "exuberant chorus" that articulates the great happiness of triumphing through Christ.

Hawn proposed that this Hindu hymn could be made relevant to 21st-century Western culture if people were to consider the experience of the Dalits, people in the social caste of Untouchables in India, when singing the song. The Dalit Christians would experience liberty when singing of triumphing through Christ. By familiarizing themselves with multicultural songs, 21st-century Christians can have rarely experienced outlooks from the globally expansive Christian society. They learn, Hawn wrote, that Jesus "has become incarnate throughout the world".
