= Vietnamese people in Finland =

Người Việt tại Phần Lan Vietnamilaiset Suomessa / Suomen vietnamilaiset

Total population
- 15,147 Vietnamese born; 17,682 Vietnamese speakers (2025)

Regions with significant populations
- Helsinki, Tampere and Turku regions & Närpes

Languages
- Vietnamese, Finnish, Swedish

Religion
- Vietnamese folk religion, Mahayana Buddhism and Roman Catholicism

Related ethnic groups
- Vietnamese people in Norway and other overseas Vietnamese

Vietnamese people in Finland are people who originate from Vietnam and who live in Finland. People can be born in Vietnam, have Vietnamese ancestry and/or be citizens of Vietnam. As of 2025, there were 15,147 people born in Vietnam living in Finland. Similarly, the number of people with Vietnamese citizenship was 11,311. The number of people who spoke Vietnamese as their mother tongue was 17,682.

== Demographics ==
Historical population
Year	Pop.	±% p.a.
1990	1,643	—
1995	2,785	+11.13%
2000	3,588	+5.20%
2005	4,202	+3.21%
2010	5,637	+6.05%
2015	8,273	+7.97%
2020	11,562	+6.92%
2025	17,682	+8.87%
Vietnamese speakers. Source: Statistics Finland

People born in Vietnam and living in Finland, according to Statistics Finland.

Country of birth Vietnam by municipality (2024)
Municipality	Population
Whole country	13,695
Helsinki	2,830
Vantaa	1,880
Espoo	1,743
Tampere	971
Närpes	866
Turku	754
Oulu	463
Vaasa	395
Porvoo	214
Kerava	190
Jakobstad	189
Joensuu	162
Lappeenranta	152
Jyväskylä	141
Lahti	140
Kaarina	121
Kuopio	107
Järvenpää	105
Riihimäki	97
Hyvinkää	95
Mikkeli	84
Kokkola	80
Seinäjoki	77
Korsholm	75
Pori	75
Nykarleby	65
Kaskinen	64
Hämeenlinna	63
Raahe	57
Kirkkonummi	52
Korsnäs	52
Valkeakoski	49
Rovaniemi	47
Tuusula	45
Lieto	43
Kouvola	38
Kurikka	35
Kajaani	33
Salo	32
Virrat	32
Kauhajoki	30
Vörå	30
Pedersöre	29
Lapua	28
Rauma	27
Sipoo	27
Kannus	24
Loppi	24
Mänttä-Vilppula	24
Ruovesi	24
Raisio	23
Varkaus	23
Kauhava	22
Kemi	22
Nurmijärvi	22
Pargas	22
Forssa	19
Lempäälä	19
Lohja	19
Nokia	19
Mariehamn	18
Kempele	17
Kristinestad	17
Malax	16
Kangasala	15
Mäntsälä	15
Tornio	15
Janakkala	14
Joroinen	14
Uusikaupunki	13
Savonlinna	12
Askola	11
Jomala	11
Kotka	11
Kronoby	11
Muhos	11
Oulainen	11
Isokyrö	10
Sulkava	10
Vihti	10

People with Vietnamese citizenship living in Finland according to Statistics Finland.

Citizens of Vietnam by municipality (2024)
Municipality	Population
Whole country	10,076
Helsinki	1,967
Espoo	1,274
Vantaa	1,141
Närpes	869
Tampere	831
Turku	568
Oulu	330
Vaasa	320
Lappeenranta	150
Porvoo	143
Joensuu	142
Jyväskylä	131
Jakobstad	117
Lahti	116
Kerava	115
Kuopio	88
Mikkeli	83
Kaarina	75
Korsholm	72
Seinäjoki	72
Kaskinen	69
Pori	69
Kokkola	62
Hämeenlinna	60
Nykarleby	55
Korsnäs	54
Riihimäki	51
Valkeakoski	45
Järvenpää	39
Hyvinkää	37
Rovaniemi	36
Kajaani	32
Virrat	32
Kouvola	31
Salo	31
Kurikka	30
Lapua	28
Kirkkonummi	27
Ruovesi	25
Mänttä-Vilppula	24
Kannus	23
Rauma	23
Kauhajoki	22
Kauhava	20
Varkaus	19
Forssa	18
Loppi	18
Pedersöre	18
Kristinestad	17
Pargas	17
Joroinen	16
Lieto	16
Raisio	14
Vörå	14
Janakkala	13
Tuusula	13
Kemi	12
Nokia	11
Isokyrö	10
Lohja	10
Sulkava	10

People with Vietnamese as mother tongue living in Finland according to Statistics Finland.

Vietnamese speakers by municipality (2024)
Municipality	Population
Whole country	16,129
Helsinki	3,343
Vantaa	2,430
Espoo	2,079
Tampere	1,082
Turku	1,001
Närpes	977
Oulu	508
Vaasa	441
Porvoo	309
Jakobstad	237
Joensuu	177
Kerava	172
Lappeenranta	165
Kaarina	154
Jyväskylä	151
Lahti	148
Järvenpää	147
Riihimäki	142
Hyvinkää	126
Kuopio	113
Kokkola	87
Mikkeli	84
Nykarleby	83
Korsholm	80
Seinäjoki	77
Pori	74
Kaskinen	73
Kirkkonummi	69
Hämeenlinna	67
Lieto	60
Korsnäs	59
Tuusula	55
Valkeakoski	53
Rovaniemi	49
Kauhajoki	38
Kouvola	38
Kurikka	36
Vörå	36
Pedersöre	35
Sipoo	35
Kajaani	34
Salo	33
Virrat	30
Raisio	29
Varkaus	28
Kempele	27
Kemi	26
Lapua	26
Pargas	26
Rauma	26
Ruovesi	26
Loppi	25
Nurmijärvi	25
Kannus	24
Lohja	24
Mänttä-Vilppula	24
Kauhava	22
Mariehamn	21
Nokia	20
Forssa	19
Joroinen	18
Kangasala	18
Lempäälä	18
Muhos	18
Janakkala	17
Kristinestad	17
Malax	16
Mäntsälä	15
Tornio	15
Askola	14
Kotka	14
Uusikaupunki	14
Hausjärvi	10
Isokyrö	10
Jomala	10
Lappajärvi	10
Savonlinna	10
Sulkava	10

== Religion ==
The majority of the Vietnamese in Finland are Mahayana Buddhist, with a 12% Christian minority.

== See also ==
- Finland–Vietnam relations
- Vietnamese diaspora
- Immigration to Finland

== Sources ==
- Kosonen, Liisa (2008). Growing Up Vietnamese in Finland: Looking Back 12 Years Later (PDF). Helsinki: Department of Social Psychology, University of Helsinki. ISBN 978-952-10-5018-3.
- Nurmi, Jari-Erik; Karmela Liebkind (1990). "Acculturation and Adaptation". Adolescents, Cultures, and Conflicts: Growing Up in Contemporary Europe. Taylor & Francis. ISBN 0-8153-2389-1.
