= Giovanni Fazio =

American physicist (1933/1934–2026)

Giovanni G. Fazio
- Born: 1933 or 1934; San Antonio, Texas, U.S.
- Died: February 12, 2026 (aged 92)
- Education: BS (Physics) and BA (Chemistry) degrees from St. Mary's University, Texas, in 1954; Ph.D. (Physics) from the Massachusetts Institute of Technology in 1959
- Alma mater: St. Mary's University, Texas
- Known for: infrared instruments, including the Infrared Array Camera (IRAC) aboard the Spitzer Space Telescope
- Awards: Six NASA Group Achievement Awards; Tsiolkovsky Medal (1998); UNICO National Marconi Science Medal (2005); NASA Public Service Medal; Royal Society of London/COSPAR Massey Award (Gold Medal) (2008); Smithsonian Institution Secretary’s Distinguished Research Lecture Award (2009); Muhlman Award (2010); Henry Norris Russell Lectureship (2015); SPIE George W. Goddard Award in Space and Airborne Optics (2019)
- Scientific career
- Fields: Astronomy, astrophysics
- Workplaces: Center for Astrophysics | Harvard & Smithsonian
- Website: www.cfa.harvard.edu/~gfazio/

Giovanni Fazio (1933 or 1934 – February 12, 2026) was an American physicist at Center for Astrophysics | Harvard & Smithsonian. He was an astrophysicist who has initiated and participated in multiple observation programs.

== Career ==
In 1962 he joined the Smithsonian Astrophysical Observatory and the Harvard College Observatory. There he started a program in gamma-ray astronomy using balloon-borne and ground-based detectors, and the construction of the 10-meter optical reflector at the F. L. Whipple Observatory, Arizona, for the search of ultra-high-energy cosmic gamma-rays.

In 1984 Fazio was selected as Principal Investigator for the Infrared Array Camera (IRAC) experiment on the Spitzer Space Telescope (NASA). The telescope was launched in August 2003, and has since produced multiple discoveries and images of the infrared universe.

Fazio was the editor-in-chief of Journal of Astronomical Instrumentation. He was also the main editor of The Encyclopedia of Cosmology.

== Death ==
Fazio died on February 12, 2026, at the age of 92.

== Awards ==
In recognition of his scientific contribution, Fazio has received many international awards. He was awarded the 2015 Henry Norris Russell Lectureship for "his pioneering work on gamma-ray and infrared instrumentation, which has advanced our understanding in many areas of astronomy, ranging from near-Earth objects to high-redshift galaxies."

In 2019, Fazio received the SPIE George W. Goddard Award in Space and Airborne Optics "in recognition of exceptional achievements in the area of infrared instruments spanning 40 years including the Infrared Array Camera (IRAC) aboard the Spitzer Space Telescope, which has made extraordinary discoveries from measuring the mass of the most distant galaxy (GN-z11) to finding and characterizing seven Earth-sized planets in the TRAPPIST-1 system."

He was elected a Legacy Fellow of the American Astronomical Society in 2020.
