= Anh Vu =

Norwegian singer and actress (born 1986)

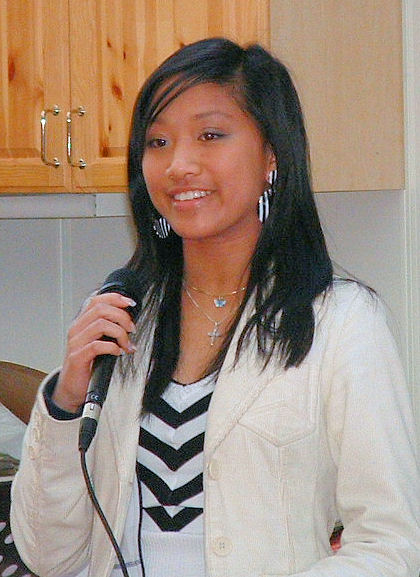
- Born: 15 March 1986 (age 40); Sandnes, Norway
- Occupations: Singer, actress
- Years active: 2004 – present

Anh Vu (born 15 March 1986) is a Norwegian singer and actress. She took part in the 2004 Norwegian version of Pop Idol. Since then she has also had a role in the 2005 teen film Tommys Inferno and in 2024 in teen show Rykter, as Felix' mom.

She was born and grew up in Stavanger and Sandnes to Vietnamese parents. She is a Roman Catholic.

== External sources ==
- Anh Vu at IMDb
