= Chai (symbol) =

"Living" in Hebrew

Chai

Chai or Hai (Hebrew: חַי ḥay "living") is a symbol that figures prominently in modern Jewish culture; the Hebrew letters of the word are often used as a visual symbol. The gematria value of chai, 18, is also often used as a symbol with the same meaning.

== History ==
According to The Jewish Daily Forward, its use as an amulet originates in 18th century Eastern Europe. Chai as a symbol goes back to medieval Spain. Letters as symbols in Jewish culture go back to the earliest Jewish roots, the Talmud states that the world was created from Hebrew letters which form verses of the Torah. In medieval Kabbalah, Chai is the lowest (closest to the physical plane) emanation of God.

According to 16th century Greek rabbi Shlomo Hacohen Soloniki, in his commentary on the Zohar, Chai as a symbol has its linkage in the Kabbalah texts to God's attribute of 'Ratzon', or motivation, will, muse. A related number of Ratzon is 60, which is the minimum level of the Divine will.

Two common Jewish names used since Talmudic times, are based on this symbol, Chaya feminine, Chayim masculine.

== Linguistics ==
The word is made up of two letters of the Hebrew alphabet – Chet (ח) and Yod (י), forming the word "chai", meaning "alive", or "living". The most common spelling in Latin script is "Chai", but the word is occasionally also spelled "Hai". The usual modern pronunciation of this word is [χai̯], while a transcription of the Biblical and Mishnaic pronunciation would have likely been [ħai̯] (with a pharyngeal consonant).

In Hebrew, the related word chaya (חיה) means "living thing" or "animal", and is derived from the Hebrew word chai (חי), meaning "alive".

== Numerology ==
There have been various mystical numerological reflections about the fact that, according to the system of gematria, the Hebrew letters of chai (חַי) add up to 18 (see Lamedvavniks etc.). For this reason, 18 is a spiritually meaningful number in Judaism. Many Jews give gifts of money in multiples of 18 (see below).

== In Jewish culture ==
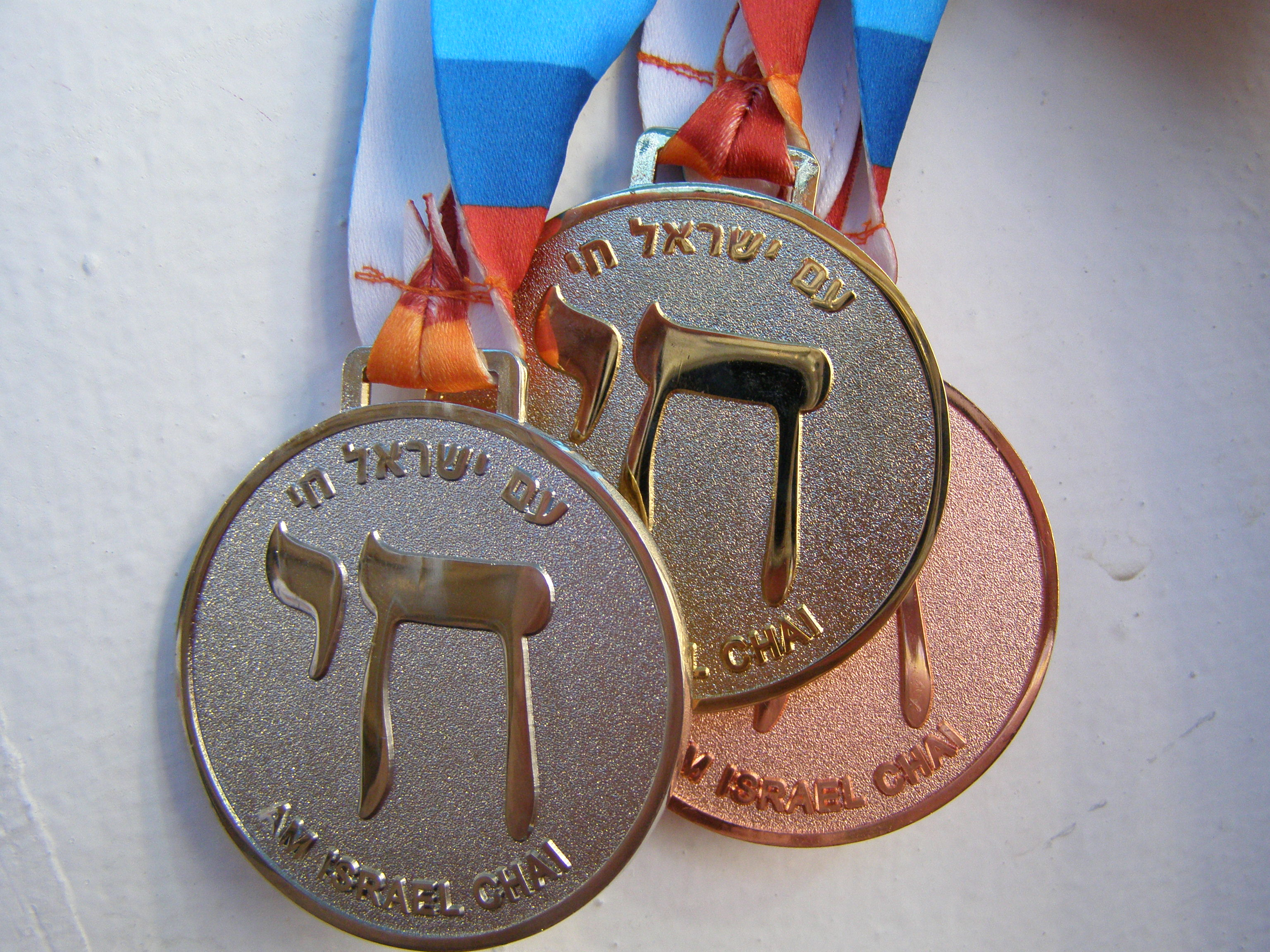
Maccabia medals with Chai symbol

Jews often give gifts and donations in multiples of 18, which is called "giving chai," meaning "giving life." Mailings from Jewish charities usually suggest the amounts to give in multiples of chai (18, 36, 54 dollars, etc.) rather than multiples of 10 or 25.

The Chai symbol (חַי) is worn by some Jews as a medallion around the neck, similarly to other Jewish symbols, such as the Star of David and the Hamsa.

It appears in the slogan "ʿam yisraʾel ḥay!" (עַם יִשְרָאֵל חַי, "The people of Israel live!").

It is heard in a BBC recording from April 20, 1945 of Jewish survivors of the Bergen-Belsen concentration camp five days after their liberation. This was the first Sabbath ceremony openly conducted on German soil since the beginning of the war. With people still dying around them, the survivors sang what would become the Israeli national anthem, "Hatikvah". At the end of "Hatikvah", British Army Chaplain Leslie Hardman shouts out, Am Yisrael Chai! ("The people of Israel live!")

In the Eurovision Song Contest 1983, which was held in Germany four decades after Shoah, Israel was represented with the song "Chai", performed by Ofra Haza, which includes the line Am Yisra'el chai.

Several Jewish radio stations have the word in their names, including Kol Chai (Israel), Radio Jai (Argentina), and ChaiFM (South Africa).

The Jewish toast (on alcoholic beverages such as wine) is L'Chaim, 'to life'.

== Chai jewelry ==
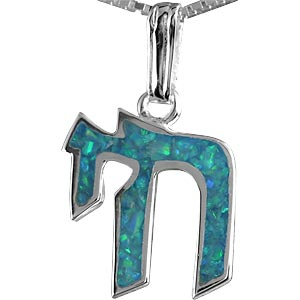
Chai pendant

Elvis Presley wore a chai necklace while performing toward the end of his life. Bob Marley wore a chai necklace during a short period while on tour in 1976. Baseball star Rod Carew wore a chai necklace during his playing days; his first wife and daughters were Jewish, even though Carew himself never formally converted to Judaism. Canadian rapper Drake, himself Jewish, wore a chai necklace on the cover of Vibe magazine in 2010.

== See also ==
- Culture of Israel
- Hamsa
- Hayyi Rabbi
- Jewish ceremonial art
- Al-Ḥayy
