= Jai Hind (disambiguation) =

Jai Hind (alternatively, Jaihind) is a salutation and slogan that means "Victory to India".

Jai Hind may also refer to:

- Jai Hind (newspaper), an Indian newspaper
- Jaihind (1994 film), a 1994 Indian film
- Jai Hind (2012 film), a 2012 Indian film
- JaiHind TV, a Malayalam channel based in Thiruvananthapuram, Kerala, India
- "Jai Hind", a song by Sachin–Jigar, Siddharth Mahadevan and Shivam Mahadevan from the 2026 Indian film Udta Teer

== See also ==
- Jaihind 2, a sequel to the 1994 film
- Jay Hind!, an Indian Hindi-language standup comedy show
- Jai ho (disambiguation)
