= Jaee, India =

Jaee
- Village
- Nickname: Jaee Nagla
- Location in Uttar Pradesh, India
- Coordinates: 28°59′N 77°56′E
- Country: India
- State: Uttar Pradesh
- District: Meerut

Population (2021)
  - Total: 12,000

Languages
  - Official: Hindi
- Time zone: UTC+5:30 (IST)
- Postal code: 250406

Jaee is a village and a Gram Panchayat in Meerut district in the Indian State "Uttar Pradesh".
