= Jai ho =

"Jai ho" (Hindi: जय हो, /d͡ʒeː ɦoː/), also transliterated "Jaya ho", is a Hindi phrase which can be roughly translated as "Let [the] victory prevail", "Let there be victory", or "May there be victory", "Victory be to".

It may also refer to:

- "Jai Ho" (song), the theme song of the 2008 film Slumdog Millionaire
  - "Jai Ho! (You Are My Destiny)", a version of the song recorded by The Pussycat Dolls, also in connection with the film
- "Jaya Ho", a Christian hymn written in the Hindi language and usually titled "Victory Hymn" when translated into English
- Jai Ho (film), a 2014 Bollywood film starring Salman Khan

== See also ==
- Jai Hind (disambiguation)
