= Java Advanced Imaging =

- Developer: Oracle Corporation
- Final release: 1.1.3 / October 2006; 19 years ago
- Written in: Java
- Successor: Java Image I/O
- License: Java Research License
- Website: oracle.com/technetwork/java/iio-141084.html

Java Advanced Imaging (JAI) is a Java platform extension API which allows developers to create their own image manipulation routines.

JAI is provided as a free download directly from Oracle Corporation for the Windows, Solaris, and Linux platforms. Apple Inc. provides an OS X version of the API from their website for Mac OS X v10.3. JAI ships with Mac OS X v10.4 and later.

While the API is provided in Java, platform-specific implementations can either use the pure Java implementation or provide an implementation that takes advantage of native technology on the platform to provide better performance.

The JAI file format codecs were superseded by the Java Image I/O API, starting with Java 1.4.

The Java Advanced Imaging project was donated by Oracle to the Eclipse Foundation and continues as the Eclipse ImageN project.
