= Journal of Astronomical Instrumentation =

Singapore scientific journal

- Discipline: Astronomy, telescopes, engineering, instrumentation
- Language: English
- Edited by: Giovanni G. Fazio

Publication details
- History: 2012–present
- Publisher: World Scientific
- Frequency: Quarterly

Standard abbreviations
- ISO 4: J. Astron. Instrum.

Indexing
- CODEN: JAIOBE
- ISSN: 2251-1717 (print); 2251-1725 (web)
- LCCN: 2013207412
- OCLC no.: 858273535

Links
- Journal homepage; Online access; Online archive

The Journal of Astronomical Instrumentation is a quarterly peer-reviewed scientific journal that covers astronomical instruments and its various components being proposed, developed, under construction, and in use. The journal focuses on astronomical instrumentation topics in all wavebands (radio wave to gamma ray) and includes the disciplines of heliophysics, space weather, lunar and planetary science, exoplanet exploration, and astroparticle observation (cosmic rays, cosmic neutrinos, etc.). It was established in 2012 and is published by World Scientific. The journal occasionally publishes thematic issues on specific topics or projects.

== Abstracting and indexing ==
The journal is abstracted and indexed in:

- Astrophysics Data System
- EBSCO databases
- Emerging Sources Citation Index
- InfoTrac databases
- INSPIRE-HEP
- Scopus
