= Radio Jai =

Jewish radio station in Buenos Aires

Radio Jai (LRL331)
- Buenos Aires; Argentina
- Frequency: 96.3 MHz

Programming
- Format: Jewish radio

Ownership
- Owner: Hamakom SRL

History
- First air date: 1992

Links
- Website: www.radiojai.com

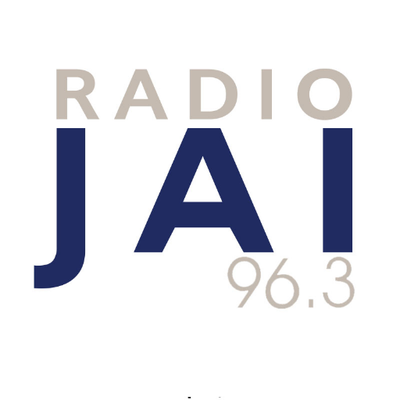
Logo

Radio Jai is a Jewish radio station broadcasting from Buenos Aires, Argentina. It was founded in 1992 by Miguel Steuermann, who is originally from Santiago, Chile. Jai is the Spanish spelling of Chai (Hebrew: חי).

Radio Jai broadcasts at 96.3 FM - the sum of the digits of its frequency is 18, the number for Chai in gematria.

Radio Jai emerged following the 1992 attack on Israeli embassy in Buenos Aires. It offers information services and cultural and general interest programs, which are presented by different personalities of the community. Rabbis are frequent guests of the shows. Politicians, economists, analysts, doctors, lawyers, musicians, comedians, actors, and sportspeople are also involved. This programming off the air before the start of Shabbat and during the day of rest, Radio Jai only broadcast music.

Its music is mostly in Hebrew, mainly from Israel. There are also Jewish songs in Yiddish, Judaeo-Spanish, Arabic and English.

Politically and geographically, Radio Jai is Zionist. The news of the day in Israel are very important for the station. It plays a Spanish-speaking audio report from Kol Yisrael four days a week. The different hosts of Radio Jai have travelled to Israel on several occasions.
