= Hai Lam (footballer) =

Norwegian footballer (born 1983)

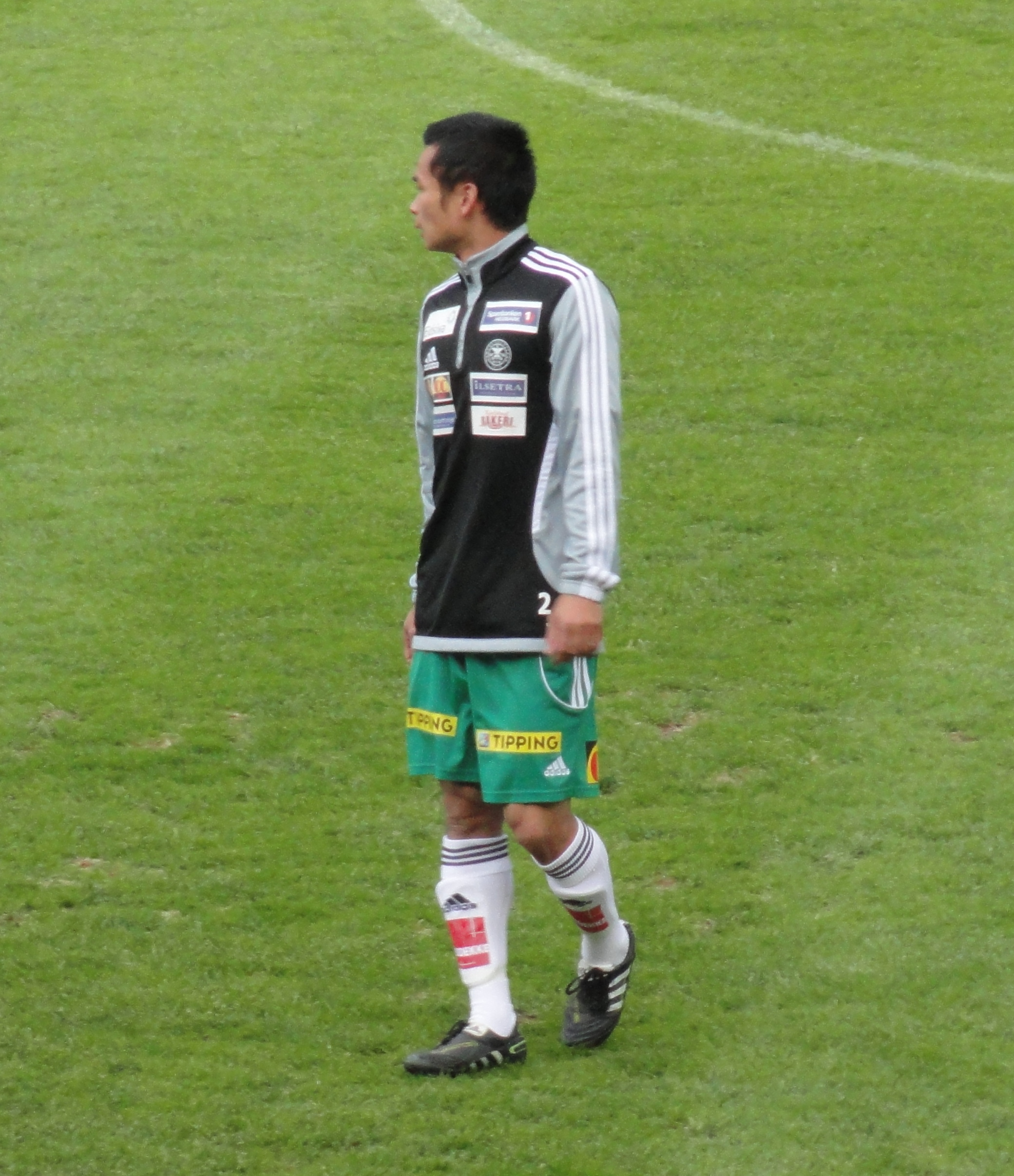

Personal information
- Date of birth: 11 January 1983 (age 43)
- Place of birth: Hamar, Norway
- Height: 1.70 m (5 ft 7 in)
- Position: Defender

Youth career
- Ridabu
- Ham-Kam

Senior career*
Years	Team	Apps	(Gls)
2001–2006	Ham-Kam	8	(0)
2007–2009	Nybergsund	49	(0)
2010–2015	Ham-Kam	19	(0)
- * Club domestic league appearances and goals

Hai Lam (born 11 January 1983) is a Norwegian former professional footballer who last played for Ham-Kam.

He was born in Hamar, joined the senior team of Hamarkameratene from the club's own junior ranks in 2001, and made his league debut on 12 June 2001 against FK Oslo Øst. He later played with Hamarkameratene in the Norwegian Premier League. Ahead of the 2007 season he joined Nybergsund IL. He rejoined Hamarkameratene ahead of the 2010 season.

He is of Vietnamese descent.
