= 1959 in television =

The year 1959 in television involved some significant events. Below is a list of television-related events during 1959.

== Events ==
- January 15 – Tyne Tees Television, the Independent Television (ITV) franchise for North East England, begins broadcasting.
- February 1 – The earliest known interracial kiss on television occurs during a live performance of the play Hot Summer Night, broadcast on the British ABC program Armchair Theatre on the ITV network. The kiss is between Andrée Melly and Lloyd Reckord, the latter of whom would be featured in another early televised interracial kiss three years later in the play You in Your Small Corner.
- February 1 – Nihon Educational Television begins operating to the Kanto region of Japan, operating as a for-profit educational television station for its first year.
- March 1 – Fuji Television commences its regular operations in Japan.
- April 6 – KYW-TV in Cleveland, Ohio (later WKYC) becomes the first station to use the Eyewitness News name.
- May 13 – TV Continental signs on in Rio de Janeiro. It became the first station in Brazil to implement a videotape system six months later.
- May 28 – Initiation of Lebanon's first television station, Télé Liban.
- July 13–17 – The Hate That Hate Produced, a documentary on Black nationalism in the United States, airs on WNTA-TV.
- July 24 – The Kitchen Debate occurs in Moscow, recorded on color videotape.
- August 10 – HCJB-TV, the first television station in Ecuador, starts a regular broadcasting service in Quito. The station was later sold to private interests and is now Teleamazonas.
- August 21 – The Catholic University of Chile begins broadcasting a partial service over Channel 2, the first TV station in Santiago, Chile.
- October 16 – OBXY-TV, predecessor of Panamericana Television, Peru, starts the first regular official broadcasting service in Lima.
- October 22 – Take a Good Look, an innovative comedy series created by Ernie Kovacs, premieres on ABC in the United States.
- October 27 – Anglia Television, the ITV franchise for Eastern England, begins broadcasting.
- October 31 – Ulster Television, the ITV franchise for Northern Ireland, begins broadcasting.
- October 31 – Western Nigeria Television (later known as Nigerian Television Authority) is launched in Nigeria, making it the first country to introduce television in Africa.
- November 22 – Sandmännchen, a children's bedtime stop motion series, premieres on East German television channel Deutscher Fernsehfunk. The series will continue airing on Rundfunk Berlin–Brandenburg into the 2000s, making it the longest-running animated television series in history with the greatest episode count for a single series.
- November 29 – The Grammy Awards are first televised as part of NBC's Sunday Showcase.
- December 26 – BNT 1, a member of Bulgarian National Television, the first television station in Bulgaria, starts a regular official broadcasting service in Sofia.

== Programs/programmes ==
- Alfred Hitchcock Presents (1955–1962)
- American Bandstand (1952–1989)
- Armchair Theatre (UK) (1956–1968)
- As the World Turns (1956–2010)
- Blue Peter (UK) (1958–present)
- Bozo the Clown (1949–2001)
- Candid Camera (1948–present)
- Captain Kangaroo (1955–1984)
- Cheyenne (1955–1962)
- Come Dancing (UK) (1949–1995)
- Dixon of Dock Green (UK) (1955–1976)
- Face the Nation (1954–present)
- General Motors Presents (Can) (1953–1956, 1958–1961)
- Gillette Cavalcade of Sports (1946–1960)
- Grandstand (UK) (1958–2007)
- Gunsmoke (1955–1975)
- Hallmark Hall of Fame (1951–present)
- Hancock's Half Hour (1956–1962)
- Have Gun – Will Travel (1957–1963)
- Howdy Doody (1947–1960)
- I Love Lucy (1951–1960)
- Jubilee USA (1955–1960)
- KPIX Dance Party (1959–1963)
- Leave It to Beaver (1957–1963)
- Love of Life (1951–1980)
- Man with a Camera (1959–1960)
- Meet the Press (1947–present)
- Men Into Space (1959–1960)
- Opportunity Knocks (UK) (1956–1978)
- Panorama (UK) (1953–present)
- Perry Mason (1957–1966)
- Peter Gunn (1958–1961)
- Search for Tomorrow (1951–1986)
- Take a Good Look (1959–1961)
- The Adventures of Ozzie and Harriet (1952–1966)
- The Army Game (UK) (1957–1961)
- The Bell Telephone Hour (1959–1968)
- The Brighter Day (1954–1962)
- The Donna Reed Show (1958–1966)
- The Ed Sullivan Show (1948–1971)
- The Edge of Night (1956–1984)
- The Ford Show, Starring Tennessee Ernie Ford (1956–1961)
- The Gale Storm Show, Oh! Susanna (1956–1960)
- The Good Old Days (UK) (1953–1983)
- The Guiding Light (1952–2009)
- The Huckleberry Hound Show (1958–1962)
- The Jack Benny Program (1950–1965)
- The Lawrence Welk Show (1955–1982)
- The Milton Berle Show (1954–1967)
- The Pat Boone Chevy Showroom (1957–1960)
- The Price Is Right (1956–1965)
- The Real McCoys (1957–1963)
- The Secret Storm (1954–1974)
- The Sky at Night (UK) (1957–present)
- The Steve Allen Show (1956–1960)
- The Texan (1958–1960)
- This Man Dawson (1959–1960)
- The Today Show (1952–present)
- The Tonight Show (1954–present)
- The Voice of Firestone (1949–1963)
- This Is Your Life (UK) (1955–2003)
- This Is Your Life (US) (1952–1961)
- Truth or Consequences (1950–1988)
- Walt Disney Presents (1958–1961)
- Wanted Dead or Alive (1958–1961)
- Westinghouse Desilu Playhouse (1958–1960)
- What the Papers Say (UK) (1956–2008)
- What's My Line (1950–1967)
- Zoo Quest (UK) (1954–1964)

=== Debuts ===
- January 9 – Rawhide, CBS (1959–1966)
- January 12 – The Bell Telephone Hour on NBC (1959–1968)
- February 4 – Face to Face on BBC Television (1959–1962)
- February 12 – As Far as My Feet Will Carry Me on West Germany's ARD (1959)
- February 16 – Emergency (1959) (Australia), one of the earliest Australian dramatic TV series
- April 4
  - Charlesworth on BBC Television (1959)
  - Shell Presents (1959–1960) (Sydney and Melbourne Australia), Australian dramatic anthology series
- May 2 – Markham, featuring Ray Milland, on CBS (1959–1960)
- June 1 – Juke Box Jury on BBC Television (1959–1967, 1979, 1989–1990)
- September 11 – The Troubleshooters on NBC (1959–1960)
- September 12 – Bonanza on NBC, the first weekly television series broadcast completely in color (1959–1973)
- September 12 – The Man and the Challenge on NBC (1959–1960)
- September 15 – Laramie on NBC (1959–1963)
- September 20 – NBC Sunday Showcase on NBC (1959–1960)
- September 21 – Love and Marriage on NBC (1959–1960)
- September 30 – Men Into Space on CBS (1959–1960)
- October 2 – Rod Serling's The Twilight Zone debuts on CBS (1959–1964)
- October 4
  - Dennis the Menace on CBS (1959–1963)
  - The Rebel on ABC (1959–1961)
- October 5 – Bourbon Street Beat on ABC (1959–1960)
- October 7 – Hawaiian Eye on ABC (1959–1963)
- October 15 - The Untouchables on ABC (1959–1963)
- November 19 - Rocky & His Friends on ABC (1959–61)
- Unknown date
  - Adelaide Tonight – 1959–1973 (Adelaide, Australia)
  - Bandwagon (1959–1960) (Melbourne, Australia, on HSV-7)
  - The Bert Newton Show (1959–1960) (Melbourne, Australia, on GTV-9)
  - The Bobby Limb Show (1959–1964) (Australia) (title changed in 1961 to The Mobil-Limb Show)
  - Club Seven (1959–1961) (Melbourne, Australia)
  - The Quick Draw McGraw Show in syndication (1959–1962)
  - Tales of the Riverbank (1959–1963).
  - This Man Dawson in syndication (1959–1960)

=== Ending this year ===
Date	Show	Debut
January 13	Confession	1958
January 23	Our Mutual Friend	1958
January 26	Quatermass and the Pit	1958
April 9	Behind Closed Doors	1958
April 24	Your Hit Parade	1950
June 22	The Restless Gun	1957
June 25	Dragnet	1951
June 25	The Mickey Mouse Club	1955
June 25	State Trooper	1956
September 28	Polka Go-Round	1958
Unknown	This Is Alice	1958

== Births ==
Date	Name	Notability
January 5	Clancy Brown	Actor (SpongeBob SquarePants, Superman: The Animated Series, Hulk and the Agents of S.M.A.S.H.)
January 21	Bob Boden	American producer
January 22	Linda Blair	American actress
January 27	Cris Collinsworth	American sports broadcaster
January 27	Keith Olbermann	American sports and political commentator
January 31	Anthony LaPaglia	Australian actor (Without a Trace)
January 31	Kelly Lynch	Actress
February 3	Fredric Lehne	Actor (Mancuso, F.B.I.)
February 11	Bradley Cole	Actor (Guiding Light)
February 12	Larry Nance	NBA basketball player
February 15	Joseph R. Gannascoli	American actor
February 18	Jayne Atkinson	English-American actress (24)
February 22	Kyle MacLachlan	Actor (Twin Peaks, Desperate Housewives)
February 24	Beth Broderick	Actress (The 5 Mrs. Buchanans, Sabrina the Teenage Witch)
February 26	Rolando Blackman	NBA basketball player
March 5	Talia Balsam	Actress
March 6	Tom Arnold	Actor and comedian (The Best Damn Sports Show Period)
March 7	Donna Murphy	Actress and singer
March 8	Lester Holt	Journalist and news anchor
March 8	Aidan Quinn	Actor
March 9	Tom Amandes	Actor (Everwood)
March 9	Kato Kaelin	Actor and TV personality
March 14	Tamara Tunie	Actress (As the World Turns, Law & Order: Special Victims Unit)
March 16	Flavor Flav	Rapper
March 20	Sting	Pro wrestler
March 22	Stephen Lambert	English television producer
April 3	David Hyde Pierce	Actor (Frasier, The Powers That Be)
April 3	Amy Morton	Actress
April 4	Phil Morris	Actor (Smallville, The Secret Saturdays, Legion of Super Heroes)
April 15	Emma Thompson	English actress
April 15	Thomas F. Wilson	Actor (SpongeBob SquarePants, Tales of Arcadia, Back to the Future)
April 17	Sean Bean	English actor (Sharpe, Game of Thrones)
April 22	Ryan Stiles	Actor (Whose Line Is It Anyway?)
April 23	Dan Frischman	Actor (Head of the Class)
April 24	Paula Yates	English television presenter (died 2000)
May 3	Ben Elton	English comedian and writer (Blackadder)
May 5	Brian Williams	Journalist
May 7	Michael E. Knight	Actor (All My Children)
May 10	Victoria Rowell	Actress (The Young and the Restless, Diagnosis: Murder)
May 13	Jerry Butler	American actor
May 17	Jim Nantz	American sportscaster
May 20	Bronson Pinchot	Actor (Balki Bartokomous on Perfect Strangers)
May 29	Rupert Everett	English actor
June 1	Eli Gabay	Actor
June 2	Kevin Newman	Journalist
June 6	Neal H. Moritz	Film producer
June 7	Mike Pence	Politician
June 10	Tim Van Patten	Director
June 11	Hugh Laurie	English actor (Jeeves and Wooster, House)
June 12	Marty Griffin	Journalist
June 15	Eileen Davidson	Actress (Days of Our Lives, The Young and the Restless, The Real Housewives of Beverly Hills)
June 16	The Ultimate Warrior	Pro wrestler (died 2014)
June 21	Tom Chambers	NBA basketball player
June 24	Dan Gilroy	Screenwriter
June 26	Mark McKinney	Actor and comedian (The Kids in the Hall, Superstore)
June 27	Janusz Kamiński	Director
June 30	Vincent D'Onofrio	Actor (Law & Order: Criminal Intent)
July 1	Phyllis Cicero	American actress (Barney & Friends) (died 2021)
July 3	David Shore	Canadian television writer
July 7	Billy Campbell	Actor (Once and Again, The 4400, The Rocketeer)
July 8	Robert Knepper	Actor (Prison Break, Heroes)
July 9	Kevin Nash	Pro wrestler
July 12	Charlie Murphy	Actor and comedian (died 2017)
July 16	Bob Joles	Actor (Big City Greens, SpongeBob SquarePants, Spider-Man)
July 24	Shawn Weatherly	Actress
July 25	Geoffrey Zakarian	American chef, restaurateur, television personality and author
July 26	Kevin Spacey	Actor (Wiseguy, House of Cards)
July 26	Tom McGowan	Actor (Frasier, Everybody Loves Raymond, The War at Home)
August 2	Victoria Jackson	Actress (Saturday Night Live)
August 3	John C. McGinley	Actor (Scrubs, DreamWorks Dragons: Rescue Riders, Justice League Unlimited)
August 5	Mark Cendrowski	Director
August 10	Rosanna Arquette	Actress
August 13	Danny Bonaduce	Actor (The Partridge Family)
August 14	Marcia Gay Harden	Actress (Pollock, Code Black)
August 14	Magic Johnson	NBA basketball player
August 17	Derek McGinty	American news anchor
August 18	June Angela	Actress (The Electric Company)
August 19	Pamela Fryman	Director
August 28	Arthur Holden	Actor
September 5	Rickey Minor	Bass player
September 11	John Hawkes	Actor (Deadwood, Eastbound & Down)
September 13	Chris Hansen	Television journalist (Dateline NBC)
September 14	Mary Crosby	Actress (Dallas)
September 14	Anthony Asbury	Actor
September 15	Kevin Allen	Actor
September 19	Carolyn McCormick	Actress (Law & Order)
September 21	Dave Coulier	Actor (Joey Gladstone on Full House)
September 23	Jason Alexander	Actor (Seinfeld, Hit the Road, Duckman)
September 27	Stephen Caffrey	Actor (Tour of Duty)
September 28	Steve Hytner	Actor
September 30	Debrah Farentino	Actress
October 3	Jack Wagner	Actor (The Bold and the Beautiful)
October 3	Greg Proops	Actor
October 7	Simon Cowell	English television personality
October 7	Dylan Baker	Actor
October 8	Nick Bakay	Actor (Sabrina the Teenage Witch, The Angry Beavers)
October 10	Julia Sweeney	Actress (Saturday Night Live)
October 10	Bradley Whitford	Actor (The West Wing)
October 13	Marie Osmond	Actress and singer (Donny & Marie)
October 17	Norm Macdonald	Actor and comedian (Saturday Night Live, Mike Tyson Mysteries) (died 2021)
October 23	"Weird Al" Yankovic	Music parodist and actor (My Little Pony: Friendship Is Magic, Adventure Time, Tim and Eric Awesome Show, Great Job!)
October 23	Nancy Grace	American anchor
October 26	François Chau	American-Cambodian actor (Lost)
November 10	Mackenzie Phillips	Actress (One Day at a Time)
November 12	Vincent Irizarry	Soap opera actor
November 14	Paul Attanasio	American screenwriter
November 19	Allison Janney	Actress (The West Wing, Mom)
November 26	Jamie Rose	Actress (Falcon Crest)
November 28	Judd Nelson	Actor (Suddenly Susan, Ben 10: Omniverse)
December 5	Connie Needham	Actress (Eight is Enough)
December 6	Tom Foreman	Canadian television writer
December 9	Terry Moran	American journalist
December 9	Pat Battle	American journalist
December 10	Mark Aguirre	NBA basketball player
December 10	Burke Moses	Actor
December 13	Johnny Whitaker	Actor (Family Affair)
December 16	Alison La Placa	Actress (Duet, Open House)
December 29	Mark Madden	American sports talk show host
December 30	Tracey Ullman	Actress, comedian (The Tracey Ullman Show)
December 31	Val Kilmer	Actor (died 2025)

== Deaths ==
- February 3 – Beulah Zachary, American director and producer (Kukla, Fran and Ollie) (born 1911)
- June 16 – George Reeves, American actor (born 1914)

== Television debuts ==
- Peter Bowles – Dial 999
- Veronica Cartwright – Dick Powell's Zane Grey Theatre
- Seymour Cassel – Naked City
- Robert Duvall – Armstrong Circle Theatre
- Julian Glover – A Midsummer Night's Dream
- Ron Howard – Playhouse 90
- Jill Ireland – The Voodoo Factor
- Sally Kellerman – Playhouse 90
- Telly Savalas – NBC Sunday Showcase
- George Takei – Playhouse 90
