= McLennan =

McLennan, MacLennan, and Maclennan are surnames derived from the Scottish Gaelic Mac Gille Fhinnein. Notable people with the surname include:

== McLennan ==
- Andrew Robert McLennan (1871–1943), Canadian politician
- Azlan McLennan (born 1975), Australian artist
- Bill McLennan (1942–2022), Australian statistician
- Connor McLennan (born 1999), Scottish footballer
- Danny McLennan (1925–2004), Scottish football player and manager
- Donald R. McLennan (1873–1944), American business executive
- Ethel Irene McLennan (1891–1983), Australian botanist and educator
- Freddie McLennan (born 1951), Irish rugby union international
- G. S. McLennan (1883–1929), Scottish bagpipe player
- Gordon McLennan (politician) (1924–2011), Scottish leader of the Communist Party of Great Britain
- Gordon McLennan (rugby league) (1914–1966), Australian rugby league footballer
- Grant McLennan (1958–2006), Australian singer-songwriter with the band The Go-Betweens
- Gregor McLennan (born 1952), British sociologist
- Hector McLennan, Australian suffragist
- Jamie McLennan (born 1971), Canadian ice hockey player
- John McLennan (1821–1893), Canadian politician and businessman
- John Cunningham McLennan (1867–1935), Canadian physicist
- John Ferguson McLennan (1827–1881), Scottish ethnologist
- Kenneth McLennan (1925–2005), American military general
- Margo McLennan (1938–2004), English television actor
- Mark McLennan (born 1991), Scottish footballer
- Neil McLennan (died 1867), Scottish-American settler
- Nick McLennan (born 1988), New Zealand rugby union player
- Paul McLennan (fl. 2020s), Scottish politician
- Ross James McLennan, Australian singer and former Snout frontman
- Ross McLennan (drummer), Australian drummer
- Scotty McLennan (born 1948), American minister of religion, academic, lawyer and author

== MacLennan/Maclennan ==
- Angus MacLennan (1844–1908), Canadian politician
- David MacLennan (1937–2020), Canadian biochemist and geneticist
- David MacLennan (theatre practitioner) (1948–2014), Scottish actor and director
- Ian Roy MacLennan (1919–2013), Canadian fighter pilot
- Hector MacLennan, (1905–1978), Scottish gynaecologist
- Hugh Dan MacLennan, Scottish broadcaster and writer
- James Maclennan (1833–1915) Canadian lawyer, politician, and judge
- John Hugh MacLennan (1907–1990), Canadian author and academic
- Matt MacLennan (born 1976), Canadian film/television writer
- Michael MacLennan (born 1968), Canadian playwright
- Murdoch MacLennan (born 1949), Scottish media executive
- Robert Maclennan, Baron Maclennan of Rogart (1936–2020), Scottish politician
- Roddy MacLennan (born 1989), Scottish footballer
- Rosie MacLennan, (born 1988), Canadian Olympic trampolinist (Gold)
- Ruari MacLennan (born 1988), Scottish footballer
- Scott MacLennan (born 1987), Scottish cricketer

== See also ==
- Maclennan, South Island, New Zealand
- McLennan, Alberta, Canada
- McLennan County, Texas, United States
- McLennan Reservation, nature reserve in Massachusetts, United States
- Clan MacLennan, a Scottish clan
