= Lloyd Reckord =

Jamaican actor and director (1929–2015)

- Born: Lloyd Malcolm Reckord; 26 May 1929; Kingston, Colony of Jamaica, British Empire
- Died: 8 July 2015 (aged 86); Jamaica
- Occupations: Actor, film maker, and stage director
- Relatives: Barry Reckord (brother)

Lloyd Reckord (26 May 1929 – 8 July 2015) was a Jamaican actor, film maker, and stage director who lived in England for some years. Reckord appeared in 1958 in a West End production of Hot Summer Night, which as an ITV adaptation broadcast on 1 February 1959 contained the earliest known example of an interracial kiss on television. His brother was the dramatist Barry Reckord.

== Biography ==
Lloyd Malcolm Reckord was born in Kingston, Jamaica, on 26 May 1929. He began his theatrical career with the Little Theatre Movement (LTM) pantomime at Ward Theatre. As reported by Michael Reckord in the Jamaica Gleaner, "Reckord's first big role was as Tobias in a production of Tobias and the Angel at the Garrison Theatre, Up-Park Camp, when he was in his late teens.

Fired from his job at his uncle's hardware store because he insisted that he had to leave early to play his role in the LTM pantomime, Alice in Wonderland, Lloyd left Jamaica in 1951 when he was 21 to join his brother Barry, also a playwright and actor, in England." He auditioned and was accepted as a student at the Bristol Old Vic Theatre School, subsequently joining the Old Vic Company in London. He would also study theatre in the US, years later, at Howard University, Yale University and the American Theatre Wing.

Reckord appeared in the Ted Willis play Hot Summer Night at the New Theatre, St Martin's Lane, London, in 1958, with Andrée Melly as his white girlfriend; a later Armchair Theatre adaptation the following year concentrated on the couple's relationship. The ITV Armchair Theatre adaptation of this play, broadcast on 1 February 1959, is currently the earliest known example of an interracial kiss on television, and three years later he participated in another early televised interracial kiss in You in Your Small Corner, a Granada Play of the Week broadcast in June 1962, in which he kissed actor Elizabeth MacLennan. This claim had earlier been made for Emergency – Ward 10, which postdates Reckord's earlier kisses. The play was written by Reckord's brother Barry, and directed by Claude Whatham.

Reckord also acted in several television series, including Redcap (TV series) episode "Corporal McCann's Private War" 1964 as Colonel Mahadi, four episodes of Danger Man (1960–61, 1964–65), and The Human Jungle ("Enemy Outside", 1964), but feeling typecast as an actor, he wanted to move into direction.

With only limited funds, including a grant from the BFI, he made two non-commercial film shorts Ten Bob in Winter (1963, featuring Winston Stona, Bari Johnson, Peter Madden and Andrew Salkey, with a jazz soundtrack by Joe Harriott) and Dream A40 (1965).

Reckord later returned to Jamaica, where he worked as a stage director, with rare screen appearances, as in The Lunatic (1991) and Third World Cop (1999).

In 2011 his work featured in the Black London's Film Heritage Project, with the compilation Big City Stories including Reckord's 1963 film Ten Bob in Winter, as well an excerpt from the television play by his brother entitled You in Your Small Corner, in which Lloyd Reckord played the lead male character. His short film Dream A40 was shown at the London Lesbian and Gay Film Festival (LLGFF) at the British Film Institute.

Reckord died in Jamaica on 8 July 2015 after a short illness, aged 86, and his life was celebrated at a thanksgiving service on 29 July. Lloyd Reckord and his siblings, Carol, Barry and Cynthia, have been described as forming "a dynasty that reshaped Jamaica's cultural landscape".

== Filmography ==
Year	Title	Role	Notes
1959	Sapphire	Pianist in International Club	Uncredited
1961	What a Whopper	Jojo	
	The Human Jungle	Dock worker	
1965	Thunderball	Pinder's Assistant	Uncredited
1991	The Lunatic	The Judge	
1999	Third World Cop	Reverend	(final film role)
