= Barry Reckord =

Jamaican playwright and screenwriter (1926–2011)

- Born: Barrington John Reckord; 19 November 1926; Kingston, Jamaica
- Died: 20 December 2011 (aged 85); Boscobel, Saint Mary, Jamaica
- Education: Emmanuel College, Cambridge
- Occupation: Playwright
- Notable work: Flesh to a Tiger; Skyvers
- Relatives: Lloyd Reckord (brother)

Barrington John Reckord (19 November 1926 – 20 December 2011), known as Barry Reckord, was a Jamaican playwright, one of the earliest Caribbean writers to make a contribution to theatre in Britain. His brother was the actor and director Lloyd Reckord, with whom he sometimes worked.

== Early years and education ==
Barrington John Reckord was born in Kingston, Jamaica, where he grew up in Vineyard Town with his three siblings: two brothers, Carol and Lloyd, and a sister Cynthia. Reckord attended Kingston College and after matriculation went on to study theology at St Peter's College in 1948. He left the island in 1950 after winning an Issa Scholarship to Cambridge University, where he read for a degree at Emmanuel College, graduating in 1953.

== Writing career ==
He began writing plays as a student and several of them were performed at London's Royal Court Theatre (he is claimed as the first Black Briton to have had a play on there), sometimes directed by his brother Lloyd Reckord.

Della, Barry Reckord's first play, which (as Adella) had been staged by his brother in a small fringe production in 1954, was produced under the title Flesh to a Tiger at the Royal Court in 1958, directed by Tony Richardson, with a cast that featured Cleo Laine, Pearl Prescod, Nadia Cattouse, Johnny Sekka and Lloyd Reckord, and choreography by Boscoe Holder. The play dealt with the attempts by a cult leader to enforce his wishes on a female member of his congregation.

In 1961 the Royal Court also produced You in Your Small Corner, which transferred to the New Arts Theatre and was subsequently adapted for ITV's Play of the Week series in an episode that aired on 5 June 1962, directed by Claude Whatham. This broadcast was once thought to contain the first interracial kiss on television between Lloyd Reckord, the playwright's brother, and Elizabeth MacLennan, although this is no longer the case.

Reckord's most successful play Skyvers, first produced in 1963 at the Royal Court (directed by Ann Jellicoe, with an all-white cast that included David Hemmings), is considered by Guardian theatre critic Michael Billington to be "one of the key plays of the 1960s", prefiguring Edward Bond's 1965 Saved. Skyvers, which deals with the alienation of a group of working-class south London boys in the last few days at their comprehensive school, was broadcast on BBC Radio 3 in November 2012 as part of a series of plays curated by Kwame Kwei-Armah, after lobbying to ensure better recognition for black dramatists.

Reckord wrote other television dramas, including for the BBC In the Beautiful Caribbean (1972) and Club Havana (1975), as well as a book about Cuba entitled Does Fidel Eat More Than Your Father (Praeger, 1971).

In 1973 he received a John Simon Guggenheim Memorial Foundation Fellowship to Assist Research and Artistic Creation. Also in 1973, Reckord was awarded the Silver Musgrave Medal by the Institute of Jamaica.

== Final years ==
Reckord spent most of his adult life in Britain, for more than four decades with his companion Diana Athill, who wrote candidly in her memoirs about their unconventional relationship, both as lovers and friends. When in the 1970s he decided to produce his new play White Witch in Jamaica, the central role was won by a young woman named Sally Cary, a farmer's daughter from Somerset, who began an intimate involvement with the playwright that continued on their return to London, leading Athill to conclude: "since she was spending almost every night in Barry's bed, keeping her bedsitter was a waste of money, so I suggested that she move in with us.... When Sally joined us what I felt was that I now had a lovely new friend in the house, as well as a darling old one, and the next two years or so were some of the happiest I can remember."

In the last few years of his life Reckord suffered from ill health, eventually moving back to Jamaica to live with family. He died on the island in Boscobel, Saint Mary Parish, in December 2011, aged 85. In accordance with his wishes, his body was donated to the University of the West Indies for medical research.

== Legacy ==
On 23 September 2012, a tribute to Reckord's life and work, called "Reckord Celebrations" (directed by Michael Buffong for Talawa Theatre Company and The London Hub), was held at the Bush Theatre, Shepherd's Bush, London, with contributors including Max Stafford-Clark, Kwame Kwei-Armah, Don Warrington and Diana Athill.

At the same time The London Hub launched the Barry Reckord Bursary, open to black, Asian and minority ethnic (BAME) artists, and designed to encourage new playwrights. As Michael Billington commented in The Guardian: "It's good to see Reckord at last being given his due. But one way to celebrate a playwright is to encourage his successors." The first recipient of the Barry Reckord Bursary was announced as Ravi Thornton in January 2013.

In April 2017, theatre company Thee Black Swan in association with the Chelsea Theatre in London staged a new production of Reckord's play White Witch, presented for the first time in the UK. Set in 18th-century Jamaica at Rose Hall mansion, and based on a true story, the play tells of a young white woman who falls in love with a black man at a time when their relationship is taboo, and of the fallout – "a tale of mysticism, love, cruelty and revenge cast against the unforgiving backdrop of the transatlantic slave trade." Earning five-star reviews, White Witch in this production by Joseph Charles was described by The London Journalist as "an intensely delicious and powerful play.... truly theatre at its best: cruelly assaulting the senses of the audience, stimulating unconscious fears, desires and prejudices, and allowing unrepressed joy to burst forth... A supreme performance from a small company shouting loudly from the shadows."

== Selected plays ==
- 1953: Della (Ward Theatre, Kingston, Jamaica)
- 1954: Adella (London)
- 1958: Flesh to a Tiger (Royal Court Theatre, London)
- 1960: You in Your Small Corner (Royal Court); adapted for Granada Television's Play of the Week strand, 1962
- 1963, 1971: Skyvers (Royal Court)
- 1969: Don't Gas the Blacks (Royal Court; directed by Lloyd Reckord)
- 1970: A Liberated Woman (Royal Court)
- 1973: Give the Gaffers Time To Love You (Royal Court, Theatre Upstairs)
- 1974: X (Royal Court, Theatre Upstairs)
- 1975: White Witch of Rose Hall (Creative Arts Centre, University of the West Indies, Mona Campus, Jamaica, 4 October)
- 1984: Streetwise
- 1988: Sugar D (Barn Theatre, Kingston, Jamaica)

== Bibliography ==
- Yvonne Brewster, ed., For the Reckord (a collection of three plays by Barry Reckord: Flesh to a Tiger; Skyvers; The White Witch). London: Oberon Books, 2010. ISBN 978-1-84943-053-1
