= Andrée Melly =

English actress (1932–2020)

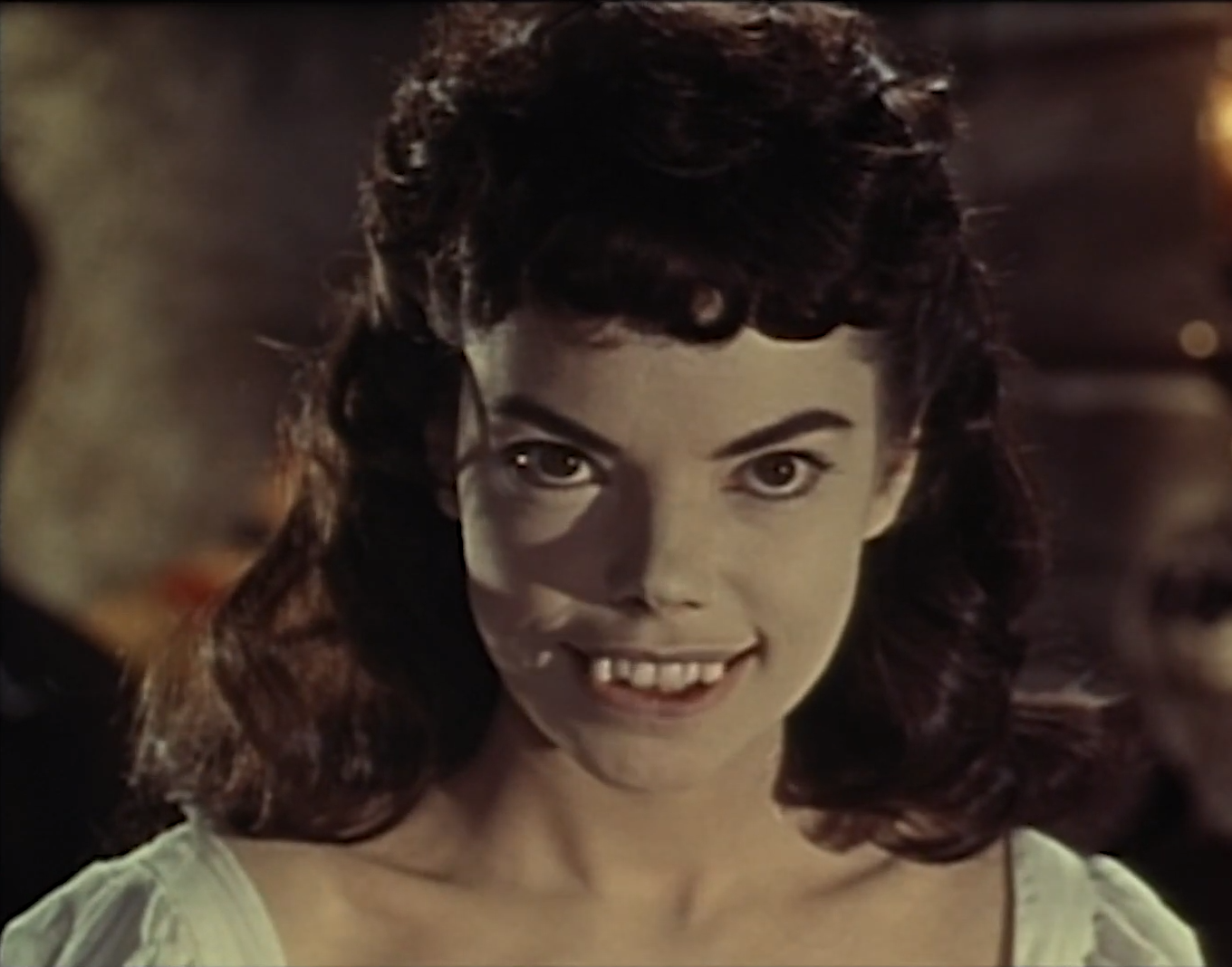
- Melly in The Brides of Dracula (1960)
- Born: 15 September 1932; Liverpool, Lancashire, England
- Died: 31 January 2020 (aged 87); Santa Eulària des Riu, Ibiza, Spain
- Occupation: Actress
- Years active: 1952–1990
- Spouse: Oscar Quitak
- Relatives: George Melly (brother)

Andrée Melly (15 September 1932 – 31 January 2020) was an English actress.

== Early life ==
Melly was born on 15 December 1932 in Liverpool, Lancashire to Edith and Francis Melly. She made her stage début aged nine at the Little Theatre, Southport. After leaving Belvedere School, she attended the Swiss finishing school Mon Fertile, after which she acted in repertory theatre.

== Career ==
She performed at the Old Vic in Romeo and Juliet, The Merchant of Venice and T.S. Eliot's Murder in the Cathedral in her early twenties and worked with Peter Finch and Robert Donat at the theatre. In 1958, she appeared with the Jamaican actor Lloyd Reckord in the Ted Willis play Hot Summer Night, a production which was later adapted for the Armchair Theatre series in 1959 and in which she was a participant in the earliest known interracial kiss on television. She continued to appear on British television until 1991. Her other stage work includes the original West End production of the farce Boeing-Boeing at the Apollo Theatre in 1962 with David Tomlinson and as Alice "Childie" McNaught in The Killing of Sister George at St Martin's in 1966.

Melly appeared in British films, including the comedy The Belles of St. Trinian's (1954) and the Hammer Horror film The Brides of Dracula (1960). Her role in the latter film was as Gina, a woman who is bitten by Baron Meinster, a vampire, turning her into another undead character.

She reported in an interview with the writer Oscar Martinez in the magazine Little Shoppe of Horrors that she had played the role of Dracula's bride because she wanted to explore varied characters. She had previously played, on BBC television, Joan of Arc, and Jo March in Little Women, and the first white woman who played opposite a black man in a romantic drama in the West End, Hot Summer Night. She also played a lesbian lead in The Killing of Sister George also in the West End, in keeping with unusual roles.

During the filming of The Brides of Dracula, she invited her older brother George Melly, who was writing the cartoon strip Flook (drawn by Trog) in The Daily Mail, to come to the film set to capture the filming of her climbing out of a coffin dressed as a vampire. George satirised his visit in his comic strip by having the character Flook visit a horror film studio that was employing his sister, who was playing a witch. The episode subsequently reappeared as a chapter on "My Little Sister" in George's fictional autobiography, I, Flook (1962), in which Andrée's character, Lucretia, is described as having "long ratty hair and not too clean", and "baleful malevolence" in her eyes.

When Oscar Martinez interviewed Melly and her husband, the actor Oscar Quitak, he called the interview "The Vampire Woman and the Hunchback" because Quitak had played a hunchback in another Hammer horror film, The Revenge of Frankenstein.

Melly played Tony Hancock's girlfriend in two series of the Hancock's Half Hour (1955–1956) radio series replacing Moira Lister. Although Melly's character was referred to under her real life name, she played the role with a French accent. With the death of Bill Kerr in 2014, Melly was the last surviving regular cast member of Hancock's Half Hour. From 1967 to 1976, she was a regular panellist in the BBC radio comedy Just a Minute. Along with Sheila Hancock, she was one of the most regular female contestants, appearing in fifty-four episodes between 1967 and 1976. In 1972, she chaired an episode. She was the first panellist to win points for talking for the prescribed 60 seconds without hesitation, repetition or deviation. She also appeared in several episodes of The Benny Hill Show.

== Personal life ==
One of her two brothers was the jazz singer George Melly. She latterly lived in Ibiza with her husband. The marriage produced two children.

Melly died on 31 January 2020 at the age of 87. Her husband survived her, dying on 31 December 2023.

== Filmography ==
Year	Title	Role	Notes
1952	So Little Time	Paulette	Film
1954	The Belles of St. Trinian's	Lucretia	Film
1956	The Secret Tent	Ruth Martyn	Film
1957	The Passionate Stranger (aka A Novel Affair)	Marla	Film
1958	Nowhere to Go	Rosa, cocktail waitress	Film
1960	Beyond the Curtain	Linda	Film
1960	The Brides of Dracula	Gina	Film
1960	The Big Day	Nina Wentworth	Film
1964	The Horror of It All	Natalia Marley	Film
1964	Boy with a Flute	Caroline Laser	Short film

== Television appearances ==
Year	Title	Role	Notes
1952	The Poppenkast	Katryn	Television film
1953	A Loan from Lorenzo	Elizabeth Woodville, Queen of England	Television film
1954	The Maid of Domrémy	Jeanne d'Arc	Television film
1955	Cornelia	Cornelia Taft	Television film
1955	Theatre Royal (aka Lilli Palmer Theatre)	Alycia Lawrence	Episode: "The Orderly"
1956	Act of Violence	Lenora	Television film
1956	ITV Television Playhouse	Georgie Harlow	Episode: "Woman in a Dressing Gown"
1956	The Gambler	Mlle. Blanche de Cominges	Television film
1956	Plaintiff in a Pretty Hat	Jennifer Wren	Television film
1957	Assignment Foreign Legion	Denise	Television series. Episode: "As We Forgive"
1957	Hour of Mystery	Sally Joss	Episode: "No Charge for the Proof"
1958	Saturday Playhouse	Hilda Crompton	Episode: "My Flesh, My Blood"
1958	Little Women	Jo March	Television series. 6 episodes
1958–1959	Armchair Theatre	Louise Beauchamp / Kathie Palmer	2 episodes: "Night of the Ding-Dong" (1958) and "Hot Summer Night" (1959)
1959	People of the Night	Vera	Television film
1959	Dangerous Ice	Miss Sennet	Television film
1959	The Men from Room 13	Caroline	Television series. 2 episodes: "The Man Who Sold Romances: Parts 1 & 2"
1960	BBC Sunday-Night Play	Mary Preston	Episode: "Twentieth Century Theatre: Musical Chairs"
1960	Maigret	Ernestine	Television series.Episode: "The Burglar's Wife"
1961	A Life of Bliss	April Summers	Television series. 3 episodes
1961	You Can't Win	Ella	Television series. Episode: "To Wait Collection"
1962	Boeing-Boeing	Jacqueline	Television film
1962	Tales of Mystery	Ilse	Television series. Episode: "Ancient Sorceries"
1962	Zero One	Tina Stavros	Television series. Episode: "The Marriage Broker"
1962	Let's Imagine	self	Television series. Episode: "Being a Leading Lady"
1963	The Human Jungle	Gloria	Television series. Episode: "Run with the Devil"
1963–1964	ITV Play of the Week	Melanie / Mary Boyce	2 episodes: "The Quails" (1963) and "A Case of Character" (1964)
1965	The Wednesday Play	Alicia	Episode: "The Navigators"
1967	Thirty-Minute Theatre	The Wife	Episode: "Teeth"
1968	The Sex Game	Alison Watkins	Television series. Episode: "Return Match"
1969	ITV Playhouse	Leslie Amlett	Episode: "Uncle Jonathan"
1970	The Doctors	Lena Freeman	Television series. 10 episodes
1970	ITV Sunday Night Theatre	Joanna	Episode: "The Insider"
1971	Gardeners' World	narrator	Television series
1971	The Benny Hill Show	various characters	Television series. Sketches: "The Grass is Greener" (24 March 1971); "New England 1635", "The Movie Shakers" (24 November 1971)
1972	He Said, She Said	self	Television series
1973	Spy Trap	Susan	Episode: "Salvage"
1973	The Benny Hill Show	Bo Peep's sister	Television series. Sketch: "Naked Lust in Sinful Sweden" (27 December 1973)
1974	The Best of Benny Hill	Interviewer ("The Grass Is Greener")	Television film
1981	Tiny Revolutions	Agnesa Kalina	Television film
1984	The Fasting Girl	Caroline	Television film
1988	Turn on to T-Bag	Queen Madeleine	Television series. Episode: "The Two Musketeers"
1990	T-Bag and the Pearls of Wisdom	Osiris	Television series. Episode: "Tut Tut"
1990–1991	The Third Wave	self	Television discussion series. 4 episodes.

== Radio appearances ==
The appearances below have been sourced from the BBC Programme Index.

Year	Title	Role	Notes (dates are first broadcast)
1952	Mistress Macham's Repose	Maria	BBC Home Service, 6 April 1952
1955–1956	Hancock's Half Hour	Andrée	BBC Light Programme, 33 episodes
1955	Manservant and Maidservant	Sarah	BBC Home Service, 11 January 1955
1955	Waters of the Moon	Tonetta	BBC Home Service, 9 June 1955
1957	The Repair of Heaven	Allan McClelland	BBC Third Programme, 9 April 1957
1959	Unaccompanied Child	Jane	BBC Home Service, 20 September 1959
1959	Rhinoceros	Daisy	BBC Third Programme, 12 September 1959
1960	Dead Men's Embers	Jane Cleary	BBC Home Service, 8 May 1960
1960	Woman's Hour	self	BBC Light Programme, 12 July 1960
1960	Home For the Day		BBC Home Service, 10 September 1960
1962	A Girl in a Garden	Gwen	BBC Home Service, 28 August 1962
1962	London Mirror	self	BBC Light Programme, 10 March 1962
1962	Medea	Creusa	BBC Third Programme, 12 December 1962
1963	Don't Listen, Ladies	Madeline	BBC Home Service, 8 July 1963
1966	Woman's Hour	self	BBC Light Programme, 18 January 1966
1967–1976	Just a Minute	self	BBC Radio 4, 54 episodes
1968	Play School	self	BBC Radio Two, 2 episodes
1969	Story Time		BBC Radio 4, 4 episodes
1969	Saturday-Night Theatre		BBC Radio 4, Episode: "The Lady of Lyons", 18 October 1969
1970–1973	Petticoat Line	self	BBC Radio 4, 8 episodes
1971	Right or Wrong?	self	BBC Radio 2 & Radio 4, 7 episodes
1971	Saturday-Night Theatre	Catherine	BBC Radio 4, Episode: "The Hidden Face", 23 January 1971
1974	Husband of the Year	self	BBC Radio 2, 23 February 1974
1975	Many a Slip	self	BBC Radio 4, 22 December 1975
1976	Twenty Questions	self	BBC Radio 4, 14 July 1976
1989	With Great Pleasure	self	BBC Radio 4, 30 July 1989

== Theatre appearances ==
The appearances below have been sourced from Theatricalia.

Year	Production	Role	Notes
1951	Traveller’s Joy	Eva	15–20 January, New Theatre, Bromley.
1951	Captain Carvallo	Anni	8–19 October, Nottingham Playhouse (Goldsmith Street).
1952	Italian Straw Hat	Wedding Guest	started 18 November, The Old Vic, London.
1952–1953	Love for Love		Bristol Old Vic – Theatre Royal.
1952–1953	Romeo and Juliet		The Old Vic, London.
1952–1953	Murder in the Cathedral		The Old Vic, London.
1952–1953	The Merchant of Venice		The Old Vic, London.
1953	The Moon is Blue	(understudy) Patty O'Neill	7 July – 5 December 1953, Duke of York’s Theatre, London.
1954	The Moon is Blue	Patty O'Neill	5 March – 31 July, Vaudeville Theatre, (Strand) London.
1955	The Ghost Writers	Julie Bedford	9 February – 6 March, Arts Theatre, London.
1955	The Moon is Blue	Patty O'Neill	2–7 May, Theatre Royal, Windsor.
1955	Sabrina Fair	Sabrina Fairchild	1–6 August, Theatre Royal, Windsor.
1956	I Am a Camera	Sally Bowles	14–19 May, Theatre Royal, Windsor.
1956–1957	Plaintiff in a Pretty Hat	Jennifer Wren	12 October – 14 September 1957, Duchess Theatre, London, St Martin’s Theatre, London, and other locations.
1958–1959	Hot Summer Night	Kathie Palmer	29 September – 10 January 1959, Bristol Hippodrome, New Theatre, London (now Noël Coward Theatre), and other locations.
1961	Roots	Beatie Bryant	6–19 March, Theatre Royal, Windsor.
1961	Boeing Boeing	Jacqueline	9 October – 16 December, New Theatre, Oxford, Grand Theatre & Opera House, Leeds, and other locations.
1963	The Shot in Question	Elizabeth Mayle	1 April – 18 May, Duchess Theatre, London, Theatre Royal, Brighton, and other locations.
1965–1966	The Killing of Sister George	Alice 'Childie' McNaught (replacement)	20 April – 10 December, Bristol Old Vic – Theatre Royal, Theatre Royal, Bath, and other locations.
1962–1967	Boeing Boeing		20 February – 7 January, Apollo Theatre (Shaftesbury Avenue), London and Duchess Theatre, London.
1967	As You Like It		21 March – 24 May, Birmingham Repertory Theatre.
1969	Mixed Doubles	A Man's Best Friend: Jackie; Norma: The Woman; Permanence: Helen; Silver Wedding: Audrey	6 February – 28 June, Comedy Theatre, London (now Harold Pinter Theatre, London) and Hampstead Theatre, London.
1973	That’s No Lady, That’s My Husband	Hilary Plummer	19 February – 31 March, Theatre Royal, Brighton, New Theatre, Hull, and other locations.
1983	The Bed Before Yesterday	Alma	21 April – 7 May, Theatre Royal, Plymouth.
1983–1984	Morning’s at Seven		Theatre Royal, Bath.
1984	Morning’s at Seven	Myrtle Brown	3 May – 19 August, Westminster Theatre, London, Watford Palace Theatre, and other locations.
1984 – 1985	Gala – A Tribute to Joyce Grenfell		Aldwych Theatre, London.
1988	Kindly Keep It Covered	Vanessa Harbinger	9 March – 14 May Theatre Royal, Bath, Churchill Theatre, Bromley, and other locations.
1991	Just Between Ourselves	Marjorie	2 October – 2 November, Bristol Old Vic – Theatre Royal.
