= First interracial kiss on television =

First televised depiction of a kiss between people of different races

The date and program of the first interracial kiss on television is a much-debated topic. In many parts of the world social stigma and legislation (such as anti-miscegenation laws) have hindered relations between people from different groups (races). The first kiss on television has been discussed in the context of this social stigma. As there is no agreement on what constitutes a race there is also no general agreement on when the first interracial kiss occurred, and a number of claims exist.

Some other countries, such as the United States and United Kingdom have questions related to ethnicity and race in their censuses (covered in the articles race and ethnicity in the United States census and classification of ethnicity in the United Kingdom). In both cases the census is based on self-definition. The available options differ substantially between the countries and have developed over time (i.e. two people might be considered to be of the same race in one census, but not in another).

== Claims ==
=== American television ===
==== I Love Lucy (1951) ====
Some argue that I Love Lucy (1951–1957) is premised on an interracial relationship. The program broadcast multiple instances of real-life husband and wife Desi Arnaz, a Latino man, and Lucille Ball, a woman of European ancestry, kissing. However, despite Arnaz and Ball being frequently described as an "interracial couple", "Hispanic" is not always considered to be a race, but it is an actual language. Arnaz is now considered by some to be a white man of Cuban ancestry. The United States Census Bureau uses the ethnonyms Hispanic or Latino to refer to a person of Cuban, Mexican, Puerto Rican, South or Central American, or other Spanish culture or origin regardless of race; the Census Bureau states, "People who identify their origin as Hispanic, Latino, or Spanish may be any race." As of the 1950 United States census, the most recent census held before I Love Lucy went on the air, the Census Bureau's guidelines for enumerators did not specifically address how Cuban Americans should be classified by race, nor did the census ask a question about Hispanic or Latino ancestry. Both Arnaz and Ball were listed as white in that census.

==== The Ed Sullivan Show (1958) ====
In The Ed Sullivan Show S12, E10 aired 16 November 1958, William Shatner, a Canada-born actor of European Jewish ancestry, kisses France Nuyen, originally from France, of Asian ancestry. This was during a scene from the then current Broadway production of The World of Suzie Wong.

==== Sea Hunt (1959) ====
In the Sea Hunt episode "Proof of Guilt" aired 16 August 1959, Lloyd Bridges and Nobu McCarthy (née Atsumi) shared a kiss near the end of the episode.

==== Adventures in Paradise (1960) ====
An episode of Adventures in Paradise titled "The Big Surf", broadcast in 1960, featured two written kisses: one between actress Pilar Seurat and actor Robert Sampson, and another with Seurat and Gardner McKay.

==== I Spy (1966) ====
An episode of I Spy titled "The Tiger", broadcast on January 5, 1966, featured a scripted kiss between Eurasian actress France Nuyen and Robert Culp.

==== Star Trek: "Mirror, Mirror" – Kirk and Marlena (1967) ====
Episode four of season two, "Mirror, Mirror", which originally aired on October 6, 1967, featured a kiss between Eurasian actress Barbara Luna and William Shatner.

==== Movin' with Nancy (1967) ====
A December 1967 TV special, Movin' with Nancy, featured a kiss between Italian-American Nancy Sinatra and African-American/Latin (mixed-race) Sammy Davis Jr. Sinatra kissed Davis on the cheek.

==== Star Trek: "Plato's Stepchildren" – Kirk and Uhura (1968) ====
A 1968 episode of Star Trek, "Plato's Stepchildren", which first aired on November 22, 1968, was until recently often referred to as the first interracial kiss on television.

Although William Shatner claimed in Star Trek Memories that his lips did not touch those of African-American actress Nichelle Nichols in the take that was ultimately aired, both actors later asserted that the kiss was real.

=== European television ===
==== United Kingdom ====
Unlike the situation in the United States, interracial kisses (European (White) and African/Caribbean (Black)/or Middle Eastern/Asian/Native) in British films and television shows have attracted little comment.

The 1954 British-New Zealand film The Seekers featured an interracial kiss between a European (played by Jack Hawkins) and a Maori (played by German Laya Raki). This film was later screened on television in the US (under the title Land of Fury) and the UK, but the initial screening dates are unknown.

For a time, the first interracial kiss on British television was understood to have occurred during an episode of the British soap opera Emergency – Ward 10 in 1964. However, the 1955 BBC production of Othello featured several kisses between Gordon Heath and Rosemary Harris. Furthermore, in November 2015, Granada's Play of the Week, You in Your Small Corner, was uncovered which was telecast in June 1962; that quickly led to the rediscovery of another play featuring the same young Jamaican actor, Lloyd Reckord, called Hot Summer Night, televised in Britain on 1 February 1959.

===== Hot Summer Night (1959) =====
Lloyd Reckord and Andrée Melly appeared in the ITV Armchair Theatre adaptation of Ted Willis' play Hot Summer Night, broadcast on 1 February 1959. British Film Institute panel moderator Samira Ahmed was able in 2015 to announce the rediscovery of this on-screen kiss. The play was later adapted as the 1961 feature film Flame in the Streets.

===== Probation Officer (1959) =====
The second episode of the ATV drama series Probation Officer, broadcast on the ITV network on 21 September 1959, also features an interracial kiss. This again features Lloyd Reckord, on this occasion with actress Felicity Young, in a storyline concerning an interracial relationship disapproved of by both sets of parents.

===== You in Your Small Corner (1962) =====
You in Your Small Corner, live broadcast on British television from 1962.

In June 1962, a live performance of the play You in Your Small Corner by Barry Reckord was broadcast on British television as part of the Granada Television series Play of the Week. The central theme of the play is a relationship between a young black intellectual and a white working-class girl. During the play, a kiss takes place between once more Lloyd Reckord and this time Elizabeth MacLennan, and what has been described as an "explicit post-coital scene".

Many years later, You in Your Small Corner was rediscovered during preparations for a November 2015 British Film Institute panel discussion on "Race and Romance on TV" and was used in publicity for the event.

===== Emergency Ward 10 =====
One of the first interracial kisses on television occurred in an episode of British soap opera Emergency Ward 10, which was broadcast in July 1964.

One of the earliest interracial kisses on television occurred in a July 1964 episode of British soap opera Emergency Ward 10, during which characters Louise Mahler (portrayed by Joan Hooley) and Giles Farmer (portrayed by John White) kissed. The scene in which Mahler and Farmer kissed was originally scripted to occur in Mahler's bedroom, but was rewritten so as to occur outdoors, due to concerns it would otherwise be too risqué (the earlier Lloyd Reckord plays had both been shown well after the 9pm adult-content watershed). According to an issue of the Daily Express published after the episode aired, "not a viewer rang-up to complain". In a 2015 interview, conducted prior to the discovery of the You in Your Small Corner footage, Hooley noted that the historic importance of what had been known as the "first interracial kiss on television" had been inflated in popular memory:

A lot of people spoke about it more ten years later than they did at the time it was happening. So, it was much later that it occurred to me that I was part of history. I find it odd to have to admit that I was part of history because I don't see why there should be anything to do about it. I don't think there should have been all this fuss about it.

— Joan Hooley, "First Inter-racial Kiss on TV". BBC World Service. 29 July 2015.

==== The Netherlands ====
===== Pension Hommeles (1959) =====
The comedy TV show Pension Hommeles (1957-1959) is considered as the first TV series on Dutch television. Telecast on 5 January 1959, in the episode "Beeldromance", US Black actor Donald Jones sings a song, "Ik zou je het liefste in een doosje willen doen", to white Dutch actress Roeki Aronds. After the song, Jones kisses Aronds. At the time the kiss was not controversial and did not get much attention, but the song became a standard in Dutch music. Donald Jones, an actor, dancer and singer from New York (USA), was one of the first black stars in Dutch show business.

Some Dutch TV series (with main white casting) added with Caribbean and Surinamese actors along Middle Eastern and Asian actors.
