= Elizabeth MacLennan =

Scottish actress and writer (1938–2015)

- Born: Elizabeth Margaret Ross MacLennan; 16 March 1938; Glasgow, Scotland
- Died: 23 June 2015 (aged 77); London, England
- Occupations: Actress, writer, theatre professional
- Spouse: John McGrath (1962–2002; his death)
- Children: 3
- Parent(s): Hector MacLennan; Isabel Margaret Adam
- Relatives: Robert MacLennan (brother); David MacLennan (brother)

Elizabeth Margaret Ross MacLennan (16 March 1938 – 23 June 2015) was a Scottish actress, writer and radical popular theatre practitioner.

== Early life ==
Elizabeth MacLennan was born in Glasgow, Scotland, daughter of Sir Hector MacLennan and Isabel Margaret (née Adam). Her father was a gynaecologist, president of the Royal Society of Medicine; her mother was also a physician and public health professional.

Her older brother Robert Maclennan, Baron Maclennan of Rogart, was a politician; her younger brother David MacLennan was a fellow theatre professional. Their grandfather, R. J. MacLennan, was editor of the Glasgow Evening News.

She attended Laurel Bank girls' school in Glasgow, and the Benenden School in Kent. She read modern history at St Hilda’s College, Oxford, where she became active in experimental theatre productions, sharing the bill with fellow students Dudley Moore, Alan Bennett, and Ken Loach. She studied acting at London Academy of Music and Dramatic Art.

== Career ==
MacLennan acted through the 1960s, on stage and in television and film. With her husband, playwright John McGrath, and brother, David MacLennan, she helped to found 7:84 Theatre Company (in 1971) and 7:84 Scotland (in 1973). She performed in plays with 7:84 throughout the 1970s and 1980s, in such classics of British popular theatre as The Cheviot, the Stag and the Black, Black Oil (1973), Little Red Hen, Blood Red Roses, Trees in the Wind and Men Should Weep. She starred in McGrath's last play, HyperLynx (2002), directed by her daughter Kate McGrath.

In 1990, she published an account of her time with the 7:84 company, The Moon Belongs to Everyone, in which she acknowledges McGrath her "major 'influence' and life partner". In widowhood she wrote, including the play Wild Raspberries (2002), a children's book, Ellie and Granny Mac (2009), and a book of poetry, The Fish that Winked (2013).

== Televised kiss ==
MacLennan participated in one of the earliest known examples of an interracial kiss on television in Britain during You in Your Small Corner, a Granada Play of the Week written by Barry Reckord and broadcast live on 5 June 1962, in which she kissed Jamaican actor Lloyd Reckord. A claim for that milestone had previously been made for Emergency – Ward 10, which post-dates the kiss between Reckord and MacLennan. One earlier example (also involving Lloyd Reckord) has since been found.

== Personal life ==
MacLennan married playwright, screenwriter, and director John McGrath in 1962. They had three children, Finn, Danny, and Kate. She was widowed in 2002, and she died of leukaemia on 23 June 2015, in London, aged 77 years.

"MacLennan was one of nature's fiery spirits, who wholeheartedly put her beliefs into action", commented critic Michael Billington in her obituary in The Guardian. Her gravesite is with her husband's, in Rogart, Sutherland; their daughter Kate McGrath is now a theatrical producer.

== Selected filmography ==
- Joanna (1968) - Nurse (uncredited)
- The Shadow of the Tower (1972) - Catherine Warbeck
- Hands of the Ripper (1971) - Mrs. Wilson
- The House in Nightmare Park (1973) - Verity Henderson
