= Clan MacLennan =

Highland Scottish clan

- Mac Gille Fhinnein
- Motto: Dum spiro spero While I breathe I hope.

Profile
- Plant badge: Furze

Chief
- Ruairidh Donald George MacLennan of MacLennan
- The Chief of the Name and Arms of MacLennan
Allied clans
Clan Mackenzie
Rival clans
Clan Fraser of Lovat

Clan MacLennan, also known as Siol Ghillinnein, is a Highland Scottish clan which historically populated lands in the north-west of Scotland. The surname MacLennan in Scottish Gaelic is Mac Gille Fhinnein, meaning the son of the follower of St Finnan.

== History ==
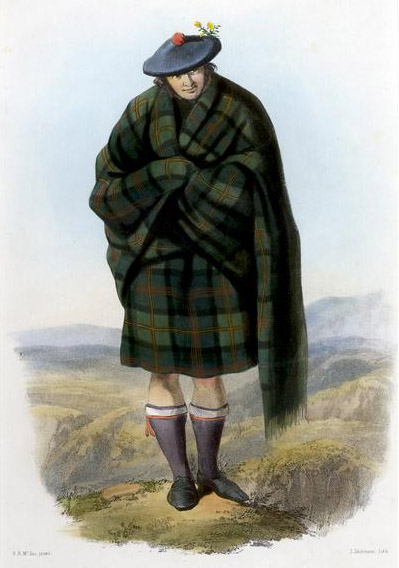
A Victorian era, romanticised depiction of a member of the clan by R. R. McIan, from The Clans of the Scottish Highlands, published in 1845.

=== Origins ===
The MacLennans settled around Kintail and belongs to a class of Highland surnames which is ecclesiastical in origin. In olden times, men were dedicated by their own devotion, or more frequently by the devotion of their parents to some particular Saint, and to express at once their homage to the Saint and the relation in which they wished to be regarded to him, under whose protection and patronage they placed themselves, or had been placed, they assumed the name of the Saint, prefixing to it "Maol" or "Gillie." The later word simply means "Servant." There are many names in the Highlands thus formed from the names of Saints, and dedications to them, such as Malcolm, Gilbride, Gillchrist. In assuming a surname from a name so formed, the prefix "Gille" is dropped - when rendered into English - if the name commences with a consonant, e.g. MacCallum, MacBride. If however, the name commences with a vowel, whilst retaining "Gillie" in Gaelic, the "Mac" is followed in English rendering by "L" - thus, Mac Gilleoin becomes MacLean, Mac Gille Adnamhnam become Mac Lennon. The MacLennans have a long and rich history. The Abbot MacLeinan (ach) died and was buried at St. Blane's church on the Isle of Bute in 776 A.D. in 1217, a Charter of Alexander II, to Duncan MacLennan, who could be the originator of the MacLennan branch Gillenem, Strathearn, who over the years became MacLennans of Galloway and Kirkcudbright. Also in 1217, A Charter to 3rd Earl of Levenaxe to Malcolm, the son of Duncan MacLennan and Eva. In 1372 at the hands of the Frasers, and MacRaes of Aird, the MacLennans were defeated at the Battle of Drumderfit, hence Clan War Cry "Druim na Deur", or Ridge of Tears. The account of the fight at Drumderfit as given by Anderson in his "Family of Fraser" seems to fit authentic history. About the year 1372 the MacLennans pillaged Tain and Chanonry after which, marching eastward, they encamped on rising ground between Munlochy, and the ferry of Kessock. The Laird of Lovat, having raised a number of his own vassals, and some belonging to the Earl of Ross, surprised the invaders early in the morning at a place called Drumderfit. Of the vanquished, but one escaped and he is said to have owed his preservation to a country basket called a Lobban, or Currich, still occasionally used as a substitute for a cart, under which he concealed himself. His descendants to this day inhabit the neighbourhood and have assumed the surname of Loban, or Logan. They have been so long tenants there that the local proverb says "as long as the Lobbans of Drumderfit."

=== 15th century and clan conflicts ===
The shield of the chief of the Clan MacLennan also shows their link to the Clan Mackenzie, whose banner was the caber-feidh. The Clan MacLennan along with the Clan Macrae were strong supporters of the Mackenzies and may at one time have been custodians of the Mackenzie's castle at Eilean Donan.

In 1452 the Clan MacLennan as septs or allies of the Clan Mackenzie of Kintail fought at the Battle of Bealach nam Broig against the Frasers under Lord Lovat and the Munros of Foulis:

"A desperate skirmish, which took place some time before this, at Bealach nam Broig, "betwixt the heights of Fearann Donuil and Lochbraon," was brought about by some of Mackenzie of Kintail's vassals, instigated by Donald Garbh Maciver attempting to seize the Earl of Ross, but the plot having been discovered, Maciver was seized by the Earl of Ross, Lord of the Isles' followers, and imprisoned in Dingwall. He was soon released, however, by his undaunted countrymen from Kenlochewe, followers of Mackenzie of Kintial, consisting of Macivers, Maclennans, Macaulays, and Macleays, who, by way of reprisal, pursued and seized the Earl's son at Balnagown, and carried him along with them. His father, Earl John, at once apprised the Lord Lovat, who was then His Majesty's Lieutenant in the North, of the illegal seizure of his son, and he at once dispatched sic northward two hundred men, who, joined by Ross's vassals, the Munros of Fowlis, and the Dingwalls of Kildun, pursued and overtook the western tribes at Bealach nam Broig, where they were resting themselves. A desperate and bloody conflict ensued, aggravated and exasperated by a keen and bitter recollection of ancient feud and animosities. The Kenlochewe men (Macivers, Maclennans, Macaulays, and Macleays) seem to have been completely extirpated and defeated. The race of Dingwall was actually extinguished, one hundred and forty of their men having been slain, and the Munro family of Fowlis although rescuing the hostage, lost eleven members of their house alone, with many of the leading men of their clan.

=== 17th century and Civil War ===
During the Civil War the Clan MacLennan came to prominence as followers of the Mackenzie chief. The Mackenzie chief was a Covenanter who fought against the royalist commander James Graham, 1st Marquis of Montrose. The MacLennans and Mackenzies fought against the royalists at the Battle of Auldearn in 1645 but were defeated. At the battle the Clan MacLennan were led by their chief Ruaridh, a red-bearded giant standing well over six feet tall.

James Graham the Marquess of Montrose was heavily outnumbered but his strategic genius more than compensated for it. He massed his banners, hoping to deceive the enemy as to the location of his main force. The ruse succeeded, forcing the Covenanters to mass their forces for a full assault. Graham the Marquess of Montrose outflanked Lord Mackenzie of Seaforth, turning the tide of battle in his favour. The Maclennans were sent an order to withdraw, but it was never delivered. Ruaridh and his men fought to the last, defending Seaforth’s standard. They were finally cut down by the Clan Gordon cavalry.

=== 18th century and Jacobite risings ===
The decimated Clan MacLennan played little part in the Jacobite risings, however eleven MacLennans are recorded as being taken prisoner after the Battle of Culloden. After Culloden the clan system began to fall apart and many MacLennans emigrated to the new world. There are MacLennan Mountains in New Zealand and a McLennan County in the state of Texas, USA.

=== Clan MacLennan today ===
Prior to 1976 there had not been a recognized MacLennan chief for over three hundred years. In 1977, the Lord Lyon King of Arms recognised Ronald George MacLennan as the 'Chief of the Name and Arms of MacLennan.

Following Ronald's death in 1989, his son and heir, Ruairidh Donald George MacLennan of MacLennan, became the youngest clan chief in Scotland at the age of 13.

The modern-day Clan MacLennan has active associations in Scotland, Australia, Canada, the USA and New Zealand.

The clan chief resides in Farr, Inverness, Scotland. His daughter, Rosie Margaret MacLennan of MacLennan, born in 2016, is the heir apparent.

== Clan profile ==
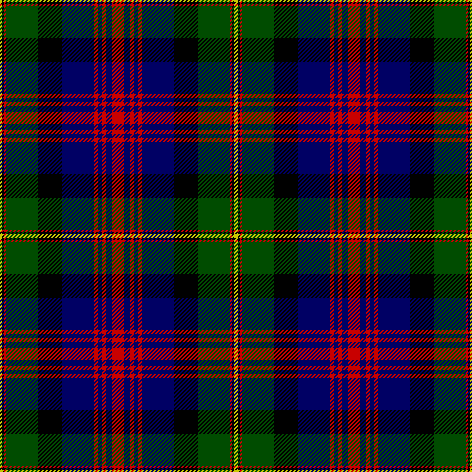
The tartan, shared by Clans Logan and MacLennan, as recorded by James Logan in 1831

- Clan chief: The current chief of the clan is Ruairidh Donald George MacLennan of MacLennan, Chief of the Name and Arms of MacLennan.
- Chiefly arms: The current chief's coat of arms is blazoned: Or, a heart of Gules between two passion nails joined in base Sable, on a chief Azure a stag's head cabossed between two antique crowns, all of the First.
- Chief's war cry: Druim nan deur, which translates from Scottish Gaelic as "the ridge of tears".
- Clan member's crest badge: The crest badge suitable for clan members contains the chief's heraldic crest and motto. The crest is: A demi-piper all Proper, garbed in the proper tartan of the Clan MacLennan. However, there exists another crest showing a folded arm bearing a sword. The motto is: Dum spiro spero. The motto translates from Latin as "while I breathe I hope".
- Clan badge: The plant badge of Clan MacLennan is furze.
- Clan tartan: Clans MacLennan and Logan share the same tartan. Anciently recorded as predominantly blue.

MacLennan Tartan: Fractional count of threads given by James Logan in 1831: 8 yellow, 4 black, 4 red, 56 green, 42 black, 56 blue, 6 red, 6 blue, 6 red, 10 blue, 18 red (centre) "Middle Line is Thicher, signifying a battle honor." Logan Taran: is different recorded in Dundee in 1793: 2 blue, 6 red, 18 green, 6 red, 2 blue, 6 red, 18 blue (NO YELLOW). MacLennan Tartan: 176 blue, 30 black, 18 green, 24 red, 40 green, 6 black, 16 yellow, 6 black, 40 green, 24 red, 18 green, 30 black, 48 blue, 30 black.

== See also ==
- MacLennan, list of notable MacLennans

== Sources ==
- (194?). The Scottish Tartans, With Historical Sketches of the Clans and Families of Scotland. W & A K Johnston, Ltd. (Edinburgh).
- Bain, Robert (1983). MacDougall, Margaret O (ed.). The Clans and Tartans of Scotland. Heraldic advisor Stewart-Blacker, P. E. Glasgow: Collins. ISBN 0-00-411117-6.
- MacDonald, Micheil (1995). The Clans of Scotland, The History and Landscape of the Scottish Clans. London: Grange Books. ISBN 1-85627-749-6.
- Stewart, Donald Calder (1974). The Setts of the Scottish Tartans, with descriptive and historical notes (2nd revised ed.). London: Shepheard-Walwyn. ISBN 0-85683-011-9.
- Way, George; Squire, Romilly (2000). Clans & Tartans. Glasgow: HarperCollins. ISBN 0-00-472501-8.
