= The Pattern of Marriage =

1953 British TV documentary series

The Pattern of Marriage is a series of one hour British television documentaries which aired in 1953 on the BBC. It consisted of four episodes and was written by Ted Willis and Caryl Doncaster, the latter also serving as producer. The Church of England, the National Marriage Guidance Council, the Catholic Marriage Advisory Council and the Magistrates' Association were involved in the research for the series.

The four episodes were entitled A Home of Their Own, broadcast 11 March 1953, Two's Company, broadcast 8 April 1953,A Son, broadcast 27 April 1953 and For Better or for Worse, broadcast 22 May 1953.
