= John McGrath (playwright) =

Socialist playwright and drama theorist

Detail from the front cover of the programme for McGrath's A Satire of the Four Estaites (1996), showing Amy Trompetter's drawing of the costume for Gloria Cupsize.

John Peter McGrath (1 June 1935 – 22 January 2002) was a British playwright and theatre theorist who took up the cause of Socialism in his plays.

== Early life and career ==
From an Irish Catholic background, McGrath was born in Birkenhead, and educated in Mold and, after his National Service, at St John's College, Oxford. During the early 1960s he worked for the BBC, and wrote and directed many of the early episodes of the corporation's police series Z-Cars which began in 1962.

== Theatrical career ==
McGrath is best remembered as a playwright and for his theoretical formulation of the principles of a radical, popular theatre. His play Soft Or A Girl was performed at the Liverpool Everyman Theatre in the early 1970s with great success, including in the cast the actor Alison Steadman. The play dealt with, amongst other things, the role of the city council in continuing, as the play claims, Hitler's destruction of large parts of the inner city and with it, parts of its history. The 7:84 Theatre Company was established in 1971 by McGrath, his wife (Elizabeth MacLennan) and her brother (David MacLennan) and The Cheviot, the Stag, and the Black Black Oil (1973), his best-known play, was created with these principles in mind. It uses some of the dramaturgical and theatrical techniques of epic theatre – actors take on multiple roles and frequently slip out of character – of the type associated with the German dramatist Bertolt Brecht but which McGrath argued have a genealogy that stretches far further back through the history of popular traditions of performance. The title of the play refers to three watersheds in the history of class struggle in Scotland, the clearing of the Scottish Highlands to make way for grazing land, the subsequent use of this land by the wealthy for shooting, and its exploitation in the oil market. These changes are identified as forming a pattern of abuse of the land and the exploitation of the people by outsiders and by wealthier locals. It was broadcast in the BBC's Play for Today series in 1974.

He adapted the satirical morality play A Satire of the Three Estates (1540) by David Lyndsay as a contemporary morality A Satire of the Four Estaites, which was presented by Wildcat Theatre Company at the Edinburgh International Conference Centre as part of the Edinburgh International Festival in 1996. This production opened on 16 August 1996 and featured Sylvester McCoy.

== Personal life ==
In 1962 he and Elizabeth MacLennan, the Scottish actress, married. They had met while at Oxford University; the couple had two sons and a daughter.

== Death ==
McGrath died from leukemia in January 2002. In McGrath's obituary published by The Guardian, Michael Billington wrote: "No one since Joan Littlewood did more to advance the cause of popular theatre in Britain than John McGrath".

== Reviews ==
- Paterson, Tony (1981), Four Decades of Drama, including a review of Two Plays for the Eighties, in Cencrastus No. 7, Winter 1981–82, pp. 43 & 44, ISSN 0264-0856
- Lacey, Stephen (1982), review of A Good Night Out: Popular Theatre - Audience, Class and Form and The Cheviot, the Stag and the Black, Black Oil, in Cencrastus No. 8, Spring 1982, pp. 40 & 41, ISSN 0264-0856

== Sources ==
- Kershaw, Baz. 1992. The Politics of Performance: Radical Theatre as Cultural Intervention. London and New York: Routledge. ISBN 0-415-05763-9.
- MacLennan, Elizabeth. 1990. The Moon Belongs to Everyone: Making Theatre with 7:84. London: Methuen. ISBN 0-413-64150-3.
- McGrath, John. 1981. A Good Night Out: Popular Theatre: Audience, Class and Form. London: Nick Hern Books, 1996. ISBN 1-85459-370-6.
- McGrath, John. 1990. The Bone Won't Break: On Theatre and Hope in Hard Times. London: Methuen. ISBN 0-413-63260-1.
- McGrath, John. 1996. Six-Pack: Plays for Scotland. Edinburgh: Polygon. ISBN 0-7486-6201-4.
- Schechter, Joel, ed. 2003. Popular Theatre: A Sourcebook. Worlds of Performance Ser. London and New York: Routledge. ISBN 0-415-25830-8.

== Externals ==
John McGrath on IMDb
