= Jesus Bids Us Shine =

- by Susan Warner
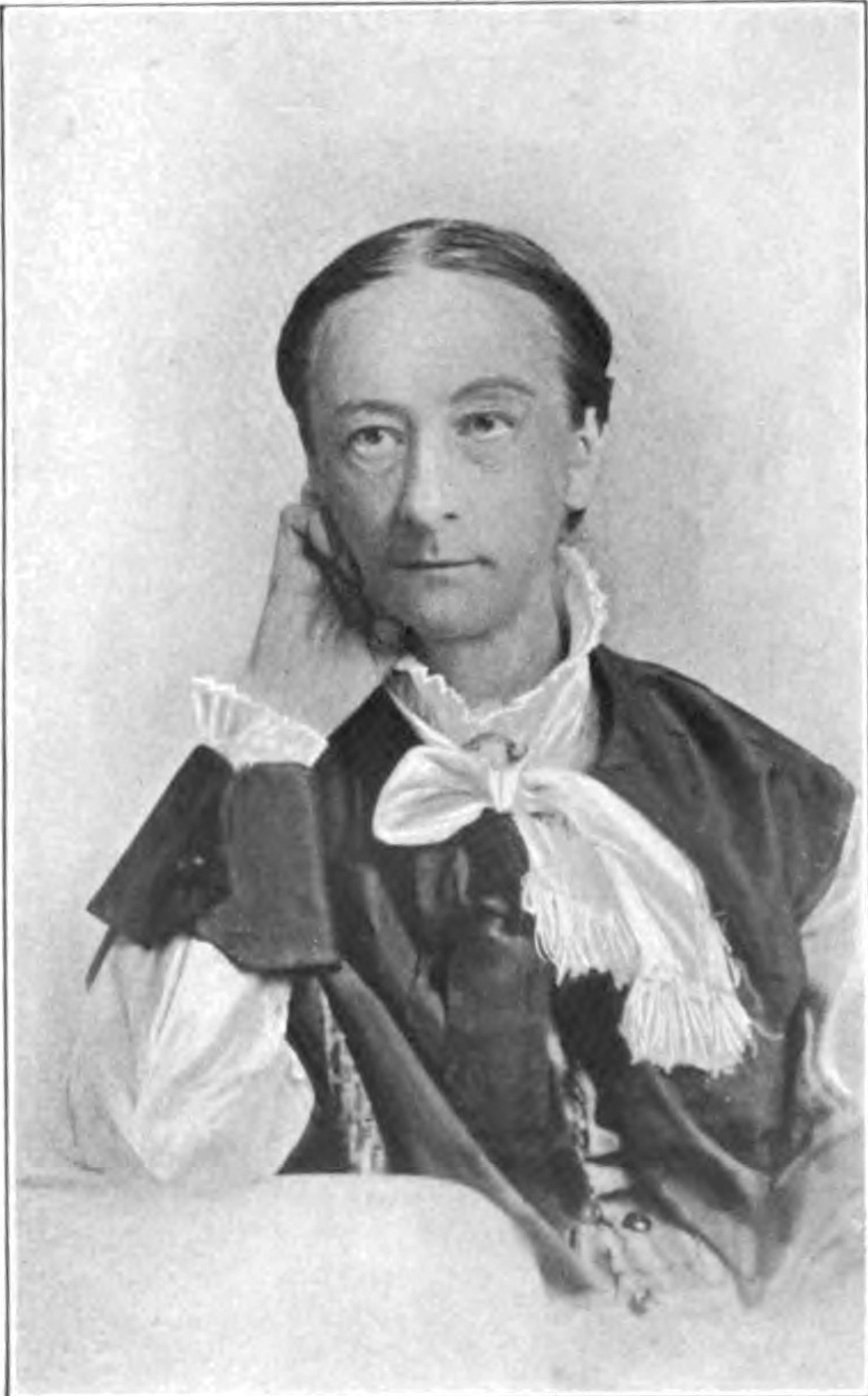
- Susan Warner
- Genre: Hymn
- Written: 1868
- Based on: Psalm 145
- Meter: 10.11.9.10
- Melody: by E. O. Excell

"Jesus Bids Us Shine" is a children's hymn with words by Susan Bogert Warner (1819-1885) and music by Edwin Othello Excell (1851-1921). It was first published in the children's magazine The Little Corporal in 1868. Actor Leo McKern was heard singing the famous last line "You in your small corner, And I in mine" in the comedic film Decline and Fall... of a Birdwatcher (1968).

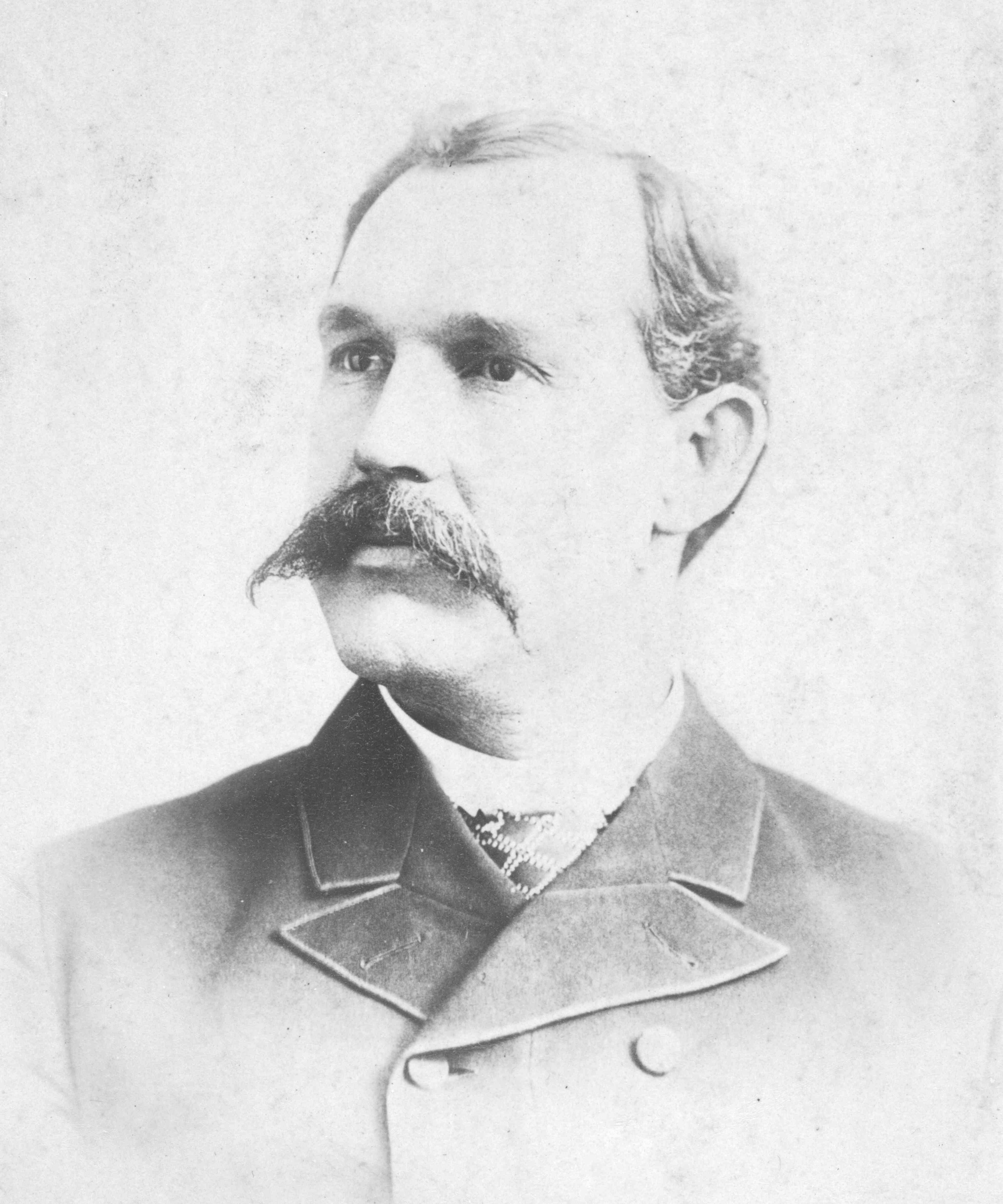
E. O. Excell

== Lyrics ==
Jesus bids us shine,
With a pure, clear light,
Like a little candle,
Burning in the night.
In this world is darkness,
So let us shine--
You in your small corner,
And I in mine.

Jesus bids us shine,
First of all for Him;
Well He sees and knows it,
If our light grows dim;
He looks down from heaven,
To see us shine--
You in your small corner,
And I in mine.

Jesus bids us shine,
Then, for all around
Many kinds of darkness
In this world are found -
Sin, and want, and sorrow;
So we must shine,
You in your small corner,
And I in mine.

Susan Warner

== See also ==
- "You in Your Small Corner", a stage play, also televised in 1962
