= Little Women (1958 TV series) =

1958 British TV drama series

Little Women is a 1958 British television serial based on the 1868-69 two-volume novel of the same name by Louisa May Alcott. Aired on the BBC, it consisted of six episodes.

== Cast ==
Cast included Phyllis Calvert, Kate Cameron, Andrée Melly, Diana Day, Sylvia Davies, David Cole, Aithna Gover, Noel Howlett, Burnell Tucker and Anne Iddon. Unlike many BBC series of the 1950s, the episodes still exist.
