= David MacLennan (theatre practitioner) =

Scottish actor, director, producer and writer

- Born: 19 June 1948; Scotland
- Died: 13 June 2014 (aged 65); Scotland
- Occupations: Actor, director, producer and writer
- Spouse: Juliet Cadzow (m. 1988)
- Children: 1
- Parent(s): Sir Hector MacLennan (father); Isabel Margaret (mother)

David MacLennan (19 June 1948 – 13 June 2014), was a Scottish actor, director, producer and writer.

== Early and personal life ==
MacLennan was born on 19 June 1948 to Isabel Margaret (née Adam), a doctor and public health activist, and Sir Hector MacLennan, a renowned gynaecologist and obstetrician. He was the youngest of four children, including his brother Robert Maclennan, a Liberal Democrat life peer, and sister Elizabeth MacLennan, an actor with whom he would work throughout his life. Growing up, Jimmy Logan was a neighbour and influence. MacLennan went to Drumtochty Preparatory School, and Fettes College in Edinburgh, before attending University of Edinburgh without taking a degree. His first marriage, to Ferelith Lean, was later dissolved. In 1988 he married again, to the actress Juliet Cadzow. They had one son, Shane.

== Career ==
MacLennan co-founded the Scottish left-wing agitprop theatre group 7:84 in 1971, with his sister Elizabeth and her husband John McGrath. In 1978 he created the influential Wildcat Stage Productions (with Dave Anderson) and worked with these two companies for most of his life.

In 2004, MacLennan created A Play, a Pie and a Pint at the Òran Mór in Glasgow; a lunchtime theatre concept which has since been implemented around the world. A documentary about this work by BBC Two Scotland (titled A Play, a Pie and a Pint: Scotland's Theatre Revolution) was announced on the day of MacLennan's death.

== Death ==
In 2013, MacLennan was diagnosed with motor neurone disease, dying in hospital in Glasgow the following year, aged 65.
