= You in Your Small Corner =

1962 episode of British TV series Play of the Week

- ITV Play of the Week episode
- Directed by: Claude Whatham
- Written by: Barry Reckord
- Original air date: 5 June 1962
- Running time: 90 minutes (including adverts)

"You in Your Small Corner" is a British television play shown in the Play of the Week series on the Independent Television (ITV) on 5 June 1962. It was formerly believed to include the first televised interracial kiss on British television until the rediscovery of an earlier interracial kiss featuring the same male actor in an ITV broadcast of Hot Summer Night on 1 February 1959.

The performance, broadcast live as part of the ITV Play of the Week series, was commissioned and produced by Granada Television, one of ITV's regional contractors. It was an adaptation of a stage play of the same name by Jamaican-born Barry Reckord and was directed by Claude Whatham.

The plot involves Dave, a young, intellectual, middle class Jamaican man (played by Lloyd Reckord; the writer's brother), who becomes involved with Terry, a white, working class woman (Elizabeth MacLennan) while living with his aunt in the Brixton district of London, en route to studying at Cambridge University. A post-coital scene, showing the characters getting out of bed and getting dressed, was also featured.

Unseen for over 50 years, a recording of the broadcast was rediscovered in the British Film Institute's archive in 2015.

== Other kisses ==
The screening predated a better known interracial kiss on British television, on Emergency Ward 10 in 1964, and the first US interracial television kiss, on Star Trek in 1968, each of which feature black women and white men.

== Stage version ==
"You in Your Small Corner" was Reckord's second play and had been performed at the Royal Court Theatre, then transferred to the New Arts Theatre. It was based in part on the author's own experiences as a Cambridge undergraduate in the 1950s.

It was omitted from the 2010 book For the Reckord: A Collection of Three Plays by Barry Reckord, as a copy of the script could not be found in time for its publication.

The title of the play is the penultimate line of each verse of the 1868 children's hymn, Jesus Bids Us Shine by Susan Bogert Warner.

The play should not be confused with works of the same title, by Eileen Corderoy (1968) or John Naismith (1987).
