= Boy with a Flute =

1964 British short film by Montgomery Tully

- Still from the film: Andrée Melly (left) and Ursula Jeans
- Directed by: Montgomery Tully
- Screenplay by: Montgomery Tully
- Produced by: Montgomery Tully
- Starring: Jeremy Hawk; Ursula Jeans; Andrée Melly
- Cinematography: Walter J. Harvey
- Edited by: Jim Connock
- Music by: Philip Martell
- Production company: Associated British Elstree Studios
- Release date: 1964
- Running time: 30 minutes
- Country: United Kingdom
- Language: English

Boy with a Flute is a 1964 British short film directed, written and produced by Montgomery Tully and starring Jeremy Hawk, Freda Jackson, Ursula Jeans and Andrée Melly. It was made by British Grand National Pictures at Elstree Studios."

== Plot ==
Dorothy Winters sees a personal column advertisement requesting the owner of the painting "Boy With a Flute" to contact Conrad Bestow at the Plaza Hotel. She takes the painting to Bestow, who offers to buy it from her. A young woman, Caroline Laser, arrives bringing with her a seemingly identical painting, claiming hers is the original and Winters' is a copy. Later, unknown to Winters, Bestow switches the paintings and Winters takes home the copy. When she realises she has been swindled, she contacts the police who set a trap for Bestow.

== Cast ==
- Jeremy Hawk as narrator
- Freda Jackson as Anne Winters
- Ursula Jeans as Dorothy Winters
- Andrée Melly as Caroline Laser
- Bill Nagy as Conrad Bestow
- Richard Bidlake as Charles
- Ernest Clark as Sir George Noble
- Guy Doleman as Superintendent Fitch
- Gerard Heinz as Mr. Duclos

== Reception ==
The Monthly Film Bulletin wrote: "Unusual in that a considerable cast has been assembled for it, this little production is completely unremarkable, but quite engaging as a screen short story. While it is not in any way difficult to foresee that Miss Winters is going to be swindled, the revenge exacted by the two sisters is sweet with poetic justice; and the acting is good."

== Home media ==
It was released on DVD in 2017 by Renown Pictures as part of The Renown Crime Collection Volume 1.
