= With Great Pleasure =

British BBC radio series (since 1970)

- Genre: Entertainment
- Running time: 28 minutes
- Country of origin: United Kingdom
- Language(s): English
- Home station: BBC Radio 4
- Original release: 19 April 1970 – present
- Website: With Great Pleasure

With Great Pleasure is a long-running BBC Radio 4 series in which a well-known personality selects and introduces a collection of their favourite poetry and prose, usually in front of a live theatre audience. The first episode featured actor Kenneth Williams and was broadcast in April 1970. In contrast to the studio interview format of Desert Island Discs, With Great Pleasure is presented by the guest host with autobiographical stories and anecdotes, and the chosen literary extracts, songs and poems performed by actors and friends.
