= Vineyard Town, Jamaica =

Neighborhood in Kingston, Jamaica

Coordinates: 17.986°N 76.772°W

Location of Vineyard Town in Kingston, Jamaica

Vineyard Town is a neighbourhood in Kingston, Jamaica.
