= Robert Maclennan, Baron Maclennan of Rogart =

British politician and life peer (1936–2020)

The Right Honourable The Lord Maclennan of Rogart PC
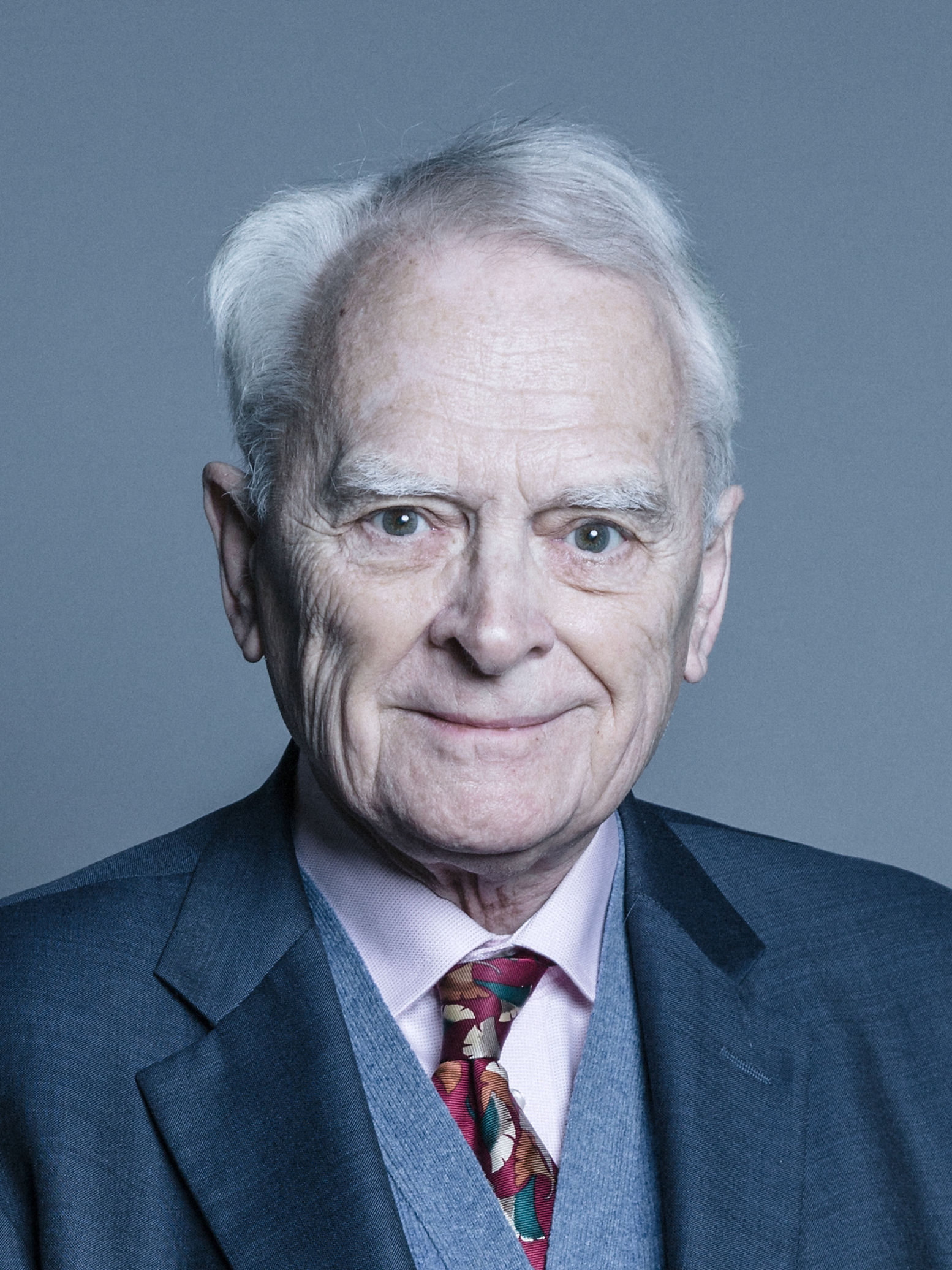
- Official portrait, 2018

President of the Liberal Democrats
- In office 1 January 1995 – 31 December 1998
- Leader: Paddy Ashdown
- Preceded by: Charles Kennedy
- Succeeded by: Diana Maddock

Acting Leader of the Liberal Democrats
- In office 3 March 1988 – 16 July 1988 Serving with David Steel
- Preceded by: Position established
- Succeeded by: Paddy Ashdown

Leader of the Social Democratic Party
- In office 28 August 1987 – 16 July 1988
- Preceded by: David Owen
- Succeeded by: Position abolished

Parliamentary Under-Secretary of State for Prices and Consumer Protection
- In office 4 March 1974 – 4 May 1979
- Prime Minister: Harold Wilson; James Callaghan
- Preceded by: Position established
- Succeeded by: Position abolished

Member of the House of Lords
- Lord Temporal
- Life peerage 19 July 2001 – 18 January 2020

Member of Parliament for Caithness, Sutherland and Easter Ross Caithness and Sutherland (1966–1997)
- In office 31 March 1966 – 14 May 2001
- Preceded by: George Mackie
- Succeeded by: John Thurso

Personal details
- Born: Robert Adam Ross Maclennan; 26 June 1936 Glasgow, Scotland
- Died: 18 January 2020 (aged 83) London, England
- Party: Labour (before 1981); SDP (1981–1988); Liberal Democrats (1988–2020)
- Spouse: Helen Cutter Noyes (m. 1968)
- Children: 2
- Education: Balliol College, Oxford; Trinity College, Cambridge; Columbia University

Robert Adam Ross "Bob" Maclennan, Baron Maclennan of Rogart, PC (26 June 1936 – 18 January 2020) was a British Liberal Democrat politician and life peer.

He was the last leader of the Social Democratic Party (SDP), serving during the negotiations that led to its merger with the Liberal Party in 1988. He then became joint interim leader of the new party, known as the Social and Liberal Democrats (SLD) and later as the Liberal Democrats. He served as a Member of Parliament (MP) from 1966 to 2001, when he was elevated to the House of Lords.

== Early life ==
MacLennan was born in Glasgow in 1936. His father, Sir Hector MacLennan, was a renowned gynaecologist and obstetrician. His mother, Isabel Margaret (née Adam), was a physician and public health activist. He was the brother of actor and director David MacLennan, actress and writer Elizabeth MacLennan, and Kenneth MacLennan.

He was educated at Glasgow Academy; Balliol College, Oxford; Trinity College, Cambridge; and Columbia University, New York City. He was called to the bar in 1962 at Gray's Inn and before entering parliament practised as an international lawyer based in London. From 1963 to 1964, he worked at Sullivan & Cromwell in New York.

== In Parliament ==
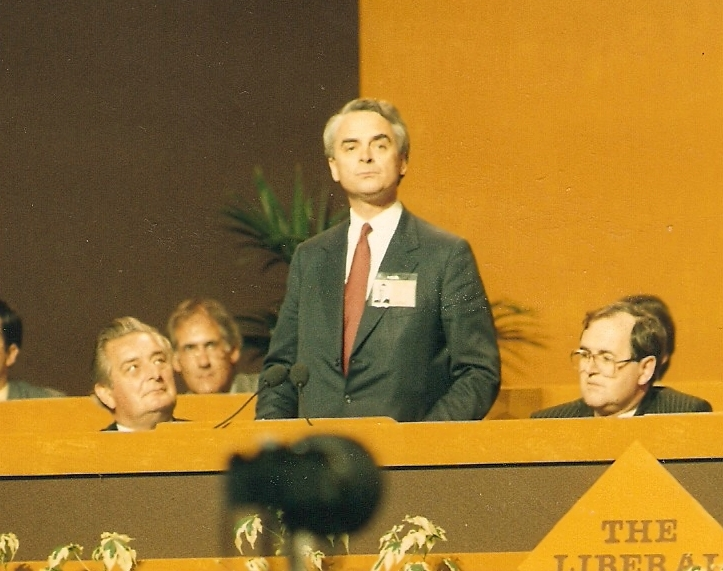
Maclennan (then SDP leader) addressing the Liberal Assembly in 1987

He became Member of Parliament (MP) for the constituency of Caithness and Sutherland in 1966, and serving until 1997; and for Caithness, Sutherland and Easter Ross after boundary changes, from 1997 to 2001.

He was first elected as a member of the Labour Party, where he was described as a "gentle Jenkinsite" and served as a junior minister in the Labour government, 1974–1979. In 1981 defected to become a founder member of the SDP, co-founded by Jenkins. Maclennan helped write the party's constitution. He was one of the few SDP MPs to keep their seats in the 1983 general election. Following his stint as SDP Leader in 1988, he served as a front bench spokesman for the Liberal Democrats, and as their president from 1994 until 1998.

He was appointed to the Privy Council in 1997.

Following his retirement at the 2001 general election, he was raised to the House of Lords, created a life peer as Baron Maclennan of Rogart, of Rogart in Sutherland. He was the party's Cabinet Office and Scotland spokesman in the House of Lords until 2015.

== Personal life and death ==
In 1968, Maclennan married Helen Noyes (née Cutter), daughter of Justice Richard Ammi Cutter of the Massachusetts Supreme Judicial Court. As Maclennan's spouse she was Lady Maclennan of Rogart. She had one son from a previous marriage, and a son and a daughter with Maclennan.

Maclennan died at his home in the City of Westminster on 18 January 2020, at age 83.

Parliament of the United Kingdom
Preceded by George Mackie	Member of Parliament for Caithness and Sutherland; 1966–1997	Constituency abolished
New constituency	Member of Parliament for Caithness, Sutherland and Easter Ross; 1997–2001	Succeeded by John Thurso
Party political offices
Preceded by David Owen	Leader of the Social Democratic Party; 1987–1988	Position abolished
New office	Leader of the Liberal Democrats; Acting; 1988; Served alongside: David Steel	Succeeded by Paddy Ashdown
Preceded by Charles Kennedy	President of the Liberal Democrats; 1994–1998	Succeeded by Diana Maddock
