= Hot Summer Night (play) =

1958 play by Ted Willis

Hot Summer Night is a play by Ted Willis first produced in 1958.

== Plot ==
"Set in Wapping, the story concerns the Palmer family, who may not, however, be quite typical of the district. For blustering Jack Palmer is a successful Trade Union leader who conceivably could be living in more affluent surroundings. However, he has so identified himself with the workers that to move to a house with a bath, for instance, would look like treachery. Thus, naturally, he fights every inch of the way for the union rights of the considerable West Indian element in his care and it is only when his own daughter [Kathie] falls in love with a Jamaican [Sonny Lincoln] that he is pulled up in his steps. Nell, his wife, whom he has consistently neglected over the years, has centred her whole life on her daughter, and approaches the problem with a blind hysterical prejudice."

== Original cast ==
- The Old Man [Jacko's father] - Harold Scott
- Frank Stephens - Richard Walter
- Nell Palmer - Joan Miller
- Jack (Jacko) Palmer - John Slater
- Judy Gomez - Joyce Howard
- Kathie Palmer - Andrée Melly
- Sonny Lincoln - Lloyd Reckord

== Production and reception ==
Hot Summer Night premiered at the Bournemouth Pavilion on 29 September 1958, subsequently reaching the New Theatre (now the Noël Coward Theatre) in London's West End on 26 November. It ran for 53 performances, closing on 10 January 1959 and being replaced five days later by the Tennessee Williams play The Rose Tattoo. Directed by Peter Cotes, it starred John Slater (Jacko), Joan Miller (Cotes' wife), Andrée Melly and Lloyd Reckord.

"After a leisurely start," noted The Stage, reviewing the Bournemouth premiere, "the play builds up into a passionate, almost violent piece of theatre." When the play arrived in the West End, the same paper called it "a sincere, simple, straightforward play" and (referring to its racial theme) "quite an absorbing preliminary skirmish." In Theatre World, Frances Stephens dubbed the play "a worthy effort by Ted Willis to deal with the current social problem created in this country by the influx of thousands of Jamaicans," also noting that it was "often moving" and that "the cast gave of their very best." In The Spectator, however, Alan Brien called the play "Ted Willis's new dramatic pamphlet" and suggested that it failed to rise "above the level of the living newspaper" - noting also that "Lloyd Reckord as the West Indian is hampered by the insistence of both author and producer that he must be twice as sunny and smiling and endearing as everyone else in case the audience is tempted to say - 'No. I wouldn't let him marry my daughter.'"

In later years Reckord recalled an incident that occurred one night "during the scene when I kiss Andrée Melly. A frail, rather timid and very gentle voice called out from the stalls - 'I don't like to see white girls kissing niggers.' There was dead silence in the theatre, and we went on with the play." The scene is reputedly the first inter-racial kiss in British theatre. Peter Cotes called the play "one of the first pieces about relationships between black and white people," noting that it "reaped a fine press in a limited run and Willis was treated with more respect as a stage playwright than he had ever been before." By Willis' own account, "Another less pleasant reaction came in the form of some hate mail."

== Adaptations ==
Three weeks after the play's closure, it was televised on 1 February 1959 as part of the ABC series Armchair Theatre.

The director was Ted Kotcheff and the West End cast was retained, with the exception of Joan Miller, whose role was taken by Ruth Dunning. According to The Stage, "The production ... was shot mostly in close-up giving greater emphasis to black and white ... Mr Willis doesn't attempt to solve the problem in this play. He just shows us individual reactions to it and that's enough to ask of any author." Again, the inter-racial kiss was reputedly a British TV 'first'.

The following year Willis wrote the screenplay for a feature film adaptation directed by Roy Ward Baker, Flame in the Streets.
