= Hector MacLennan =

Scottish gynaecologist (1905–1978)

Sir Hector Ross MacLennan FRCP FRCPGlas FRCOG (1 November 1905 – 6 January 1978) was a Scottish gynaecologist, knighted in the 1965 Birthday Honours. From 1963 to 1966, he was president of the Royal College of Obstetricians and Gynaecologists.

== Early life and education ==
Hector MacLennan was born on 1 November 1905 in Glasgow, Scotland.

== Honours and awards ==
From 1963 to 1966, he was president of the Royal College of Obstetricians and Gynaecologists. In 1961, MacLennan was elected a member of the Harveian Society of Edinburgh and served as president in 1970. He delivered the Dossibai J. R. Dadabhoy oration in 1966. He was President of the Royal Society of Medicine from 1967 to 1969.

== Family ==
His son Robert was ennobled as Baron Maclennan of Rogart. His daughter was the acclaimed actress Elizabeth MacLennan.
