= Claude Whatham =

English film and television director (1927–2008)

- Born: 7 December 1927; Manchester, Lancashire, England
- Died: 4 January 2008 (aged 80); Anglesey, Wales
- Education: Oldham Art School
- Occupations: Film and television director

Claude Whatham (7 December 1927 – 4 January 2008) was an English film and television director, mainly known for his work on dramas.

== Early life ==
In 1940, Whatham, a teenage evacuee art student, had been commissioned to paint fairytale pictures by the young Princess Elizabeth and Princess Margaret at Windsor Castle. During the Second World War, the series of portraits by Sir Thomas Lawrence that usually line the walls of the Waterloo Chamber were removed from their frames for safe keeping and replaced by his fairytale pictures, painted on wallpapers rolls. In 2020, Whatham's works were exhibited in the Waterloo Chamber.

== Career ==
Whatham attended Oldham Art School and was a set designer for the Oldham Repertory Company, before joining Granada Television, where he made documentaries and dramas including The Younger Generation featuring a young John Thaw, and You in Your Small Corner. He then moved to the BBC, where he worked on The Wednesday Play, Play for Today, Disraeli and the 1969 adaptation of A Voyage Round My Father. Other television directing included the adaptation of Laurie Lee's childhood/coming-of-age memoir Cider with Rosie and Jumping the Queue.

== Filmography ==
- Frontiers (1967 documentary short)
- All's Well That Ends Well (1968 TV film)
- Cider with Rosie (1971 TV film)
- That'll Be the Day (1973)
- Swallows and Amazons (1974)
- All Creatures Great and Small (1975 TV film)
- The Inventing of America (1975 TV documentary)
- Betzi (1978 TV film)
- Facing the Sun (1980 film)
- Sweet William (1980)
- Hoodwink (1981)
- Can I Help You? (1981 short)
- Murder Is Easy (1982 TV film)
- The Captain's Doll (1983 TV film)
- Tornado (1985 documentary short)
- Murder Elite (1985)
- Jumping the Queue (1989 TV miniseries)
- Buddy's Song (1991)
