= Ted Willis, Baron Willis =

British playwright, novelist and screenwriter (1914–1992)

The Right Honourable The Lord Willis
- Born: Edward Henry Willis; 13 January 1914; Harringay, England
- Died: 22 December 1992 (aged 78); Chislehurst, Kent, England
- Resting place: Tottenham Cemetery
- Spouse: Audrey Hale
- Children: 2

Edward Henry Willis, Baron Willis (13 January 1914 – 22 December 1992) was an English playwright, novelist and screenwriter who was also politically active in support of the Labour Party. He created several television series, including the long-running police drama Dixon of Dock Green.

== Early life and War service ==
Ted Willis was born at 55 Stanley Road Harringay, Middlesex, third child and second son of Alfred John Henry Willis (1882–1957), a bus washer who later became a bus driver, and Maria Harriet, née Meek. He recalled that when leaving school aged fourteen: "I had a two-second 'career interview' with my Headmaster. He asked me what I wished to do for the future and I told him that I intended to become a writer. His response was a cackle followed by the remark: 'You will never make a writer in a hundred years. You haven't got the imagination for it or the intelligence. Go away and learn a good trade.'"

Willis was elected Chairman of the Labour League of Youth as the candidate of the left in 1937. In 1939, along with much of the League of Youth leadership, he joined the Young Communist League, the youth branch of the Communist Party of Great Britain. In 1941 he became the General Secretary of the Young Communist League. He was drama critic for the Daily Worker.

Willis enlisted in the Royal Fusiliers in 1939, subsequently serving in the Army Kinematograph Service. He often spoke at meetings during the Second World War in favour of opening a second front, in order to help the Red Army, which was bearing the brunt of the Nazi onslaught.

== Writing career ==
His passion for drama first manifested in plays he wrote for the Unity Theatre, based in a former chapel near St Pancras, during the war. He was best known for writing the television series Dixon of Dock Green, based on the stories of Gordon Snashall, a local Chislehurst policeman with whom he was great friends; the series ran for more than twenty years. He was Chairman of the Writers' Guild of Great Britain from 1958 to 1964. Willis created several British television series such as Virgin of the Secret Service, The Adventures of Black Beauty, Sergeant Cork and Mrs Thursday.

Along with Berkely Mather, Willis was responsible for a huge proportion of scriptwriting for British television drama in the 1950s. He was listed in the Guinness Book of Records as the world's most prolific writer for television; he also wrote 34 stage plays and a number of feature films. In the 1970s he turned to novels, including a spy story, The Left-Handed Sleeper, and a wartime thriller The Lions of Judah.

Willis was active in the campaign for the Public Lending Right, alongside Brigid Brophy and Maureen Duffy.

== Honours and awards ==
Announced on 23 December 1963 he was awarded a life peerage, which was created on 21 January 1964 with the title Baron Willis, of Chislehurst in the County of Kent, on a Labour Party nomination.

Willis was the subject of This Is Your Life in 1959 when he was surprised by Eamonn Andrews in the club at the BBC's Lime Grove Studios, in London's Shepherd's Bush.

Coat of arms of Ted Willis, Baron Willis
Coronet Coronet of a Baron Crest In front of a Weeping Willow Tree a Well Head proper Escutcheon Or a Saltire Gules on a Chief Vert three Fountains Supporters On either side a Willet (Common Snipe) proper supporting with the beak a Quill Or Motto Will well

== Personal life ==
Willis married the London-based actress Audrey Hale in 1944 and they had a son and a daughter.

He was an Honorary Associate of the Rationalist Press Association, President of the Humanist Housing Association, and a member of the Humanist Parliamentary Group. On his death, New Humanist magazine wrote:

Willis was a true humanist immersed in many areas of life. He described himself (Evening All) as a "first-rate second rate author”— a modest self-appraisal. His friendliness, good humour and forthrightness made him a first-class person.

He died of a heart attack at his home in Chislehurst, Kent in December 1992 aged 78, and was buried at Tottenham Cemetery.

== Credits ==
=== Selected plays ===
- Buster (1943)
- Doctor in the House (1957, from the novel by Richard Gordon)
- Hot Summer Night (1958)
- The Scent of Fear (1959)
- Woman in a Dressing Gown (1964)

=== Films ===
- Holiday Camp (1947)
- Good-Time Girl (1948)
- A Boy, a Girl and a Bike (1949)
- The Huggetts Abroad (1949)
- The Blue Lamp (original treatment, 1950)
- The Undefeated (1951, documentary about disabled war veterans)
- A Story of Achievement (1951, documentary about the development of margarine)
- The Wallet (US Blueprint for Danger, 1952)
- Top of the Form (1953)
- Trouble in Store (1953)
- The Large Rope (US: The Long Rope, 1953)
- Burnt Evidence (1954)
- Up to His Neck (1954)
- One Good Turn (1955)
- It's Great to Be Young (1956)
- Woman in a Dressing Gown (1957)
- The Young and the Guilty (1958)
- No Trees in the Street (1959)
- Flame in the Streets (1961)
- The Horsemasters (1961)
- Bitter Harvest (1963)
- Our Miss Fred (1972)

=== Selected TV ===
- The Pattern of Marriage (1953)
- Dixon of Dock Green (1955–1976)
- Hot Summer Night (Armchair Theatre) (1959)
- Tell It to the Marines (1959–1960)
- Taxi! (1963–1964)
- The Sullavan Brothers (1964–1965)
- Sergeant Cork (1963–1969)
- Mrs Thursday (1966–1967)
- The Adventures of Black Beauty (1972–1974)

=== Novels ===
- Whatever Happened to Tom Mix? (1970)
- Death May Surprise Us (1974)
- Westminster One (1975)
- The Churchill Commando (1977)
- The Left-Handed Sleeper (1977)
- The Naked Sun (1980)
- The Buckingham Palace Connection (1980)
- The Lions of Judah (1981)
- The Most Beautiful Girl In The World (1982)
- Spring at the Winged Horse (1985)
- Problem for Mother Christmas (1986)
- The Green Leaves of Summer (1989)
- The Bells of Autumn (1991)
- Plume of Feathers (1993)

== See also ==
- List of atheists in film, radio, television and theater

== Bibliography ==
- Willis, Ted (1970). Whatever Happened to Tom Mix? The Story of One of My Lives. London: Cassell. ISBN 0304936758.
- Willis, Ted (1991). Evening All: Fifty Years Over a Hot Typewriter. London: Macmillan. ISBN 0333546865.

Party political offices
Preceded by John Gollan	National Secretary of the Young Communist League; 1941 - c.1946	Succeeded by Bill Brooks
