= Emergency Ward 10 =

British television soap opera (1957–1967)

- Also known as: Calling Nurse Roberts
- Genre: Soap opera
- Created by: Tessa Diamond
- Ending theme: "Silks and Satins"
- Composer: Peter Yorke
- Country of origin: United Kingdom
- Original language: English
- No. of episodes: 991 (900 missing)

Production
- Running time: 30 minutes
- Production company: ATV

Original release
- Network: ITV
- Release: 19 February 1957 – 27 June 1967

Emergency Ward 10 is a British medical soap opera series shown on ITV between 1957 and 1967. It is considered to be one of British television's first major soap operas.

== Overview ==
The series was made by the ITV contractor ATV and set in a fictional hospital called Oxbridge General. Growing out of what was originally intended to be no more than a six-week serial (entitled Calling Nurse Roberts), the series became ITV's first twice-weekly evening soap opera. Emergency Ward 10 was the first hospital-based television drama to establish a successful format combining medical matters with storylines centring on the personal lives of the doctors and nurses.

Emergency Ward 10 attracted attention for its portrayal of an interracial relationship between surgeon Louise Mahler (played by Joan Hooley) and Doctor Giles Farmer (played by John White), showing the second kiss on television between black and white actors in July 1964, the first such kiss being in a Granada TV play You in Your Small Corner in 1962. However, the producers wrote the Mahler character out shortly afterwards by sending her to Africa, where she succumbed to snake bite.

When ratings began to slide it was decided to convert the programme from a soap to a one-hour drama for Saturday nights, produced by Jo Douglas. It didn't work. Emergency Ward 10 ended in 1967 after the show had been on air for ten years. ATV executive Lew Grade later admitted that cancelling the series was one of the biggest mistakes he ever made in his career.

The formula was subsequently revived with the (originally) afternoon series General Hospital (no connection with the American daytime soap General Hospital) which was broadcast between 1972 and 1979.

Australia's Charles "Bud" Tingwell starred in the series as surgeon Alan "Digger" Dawson, enjoying a heart-throb status because of his role.

The closing theme tune was "Silks and Satins" by Peter Yorke.

== Archive status ==
Out of an original total of 991 episodes, 900 episodes are currently missing.

On 23 April 2025, the Film is Fabulous! project announced that the season 2 episode 1 The Long Small Hours, first broadcast on 29 September 1966, had been recovered. In May 2025, Film is Fabulous made a further announcement that 53 episodes of the show had been recovered with at least 31 of these confirmed to have previously been missing. On 17 June 2025 Film is Fabulous announced that a further 3 of the previously recovered 53 episodes had been confirmed as missing, with 1 further episode suffering from vinegar syndrome needing identification.

== Releases ==
In March 2008, Network released a DVD set containing the 24 earliest surviving episodes which date from 1959 and 1960. A second 24-episode volume was released in July 2008, while a third 24-episode set was released in 2010. A 1966 episode was included on Network's Soap Box Volume One DVD as was the sole-surviving episode of spin-off Call Oxbridge 2000.

== Main cast ==
- Jill Browne as Nurse Carole Young, staff nurse
- Rosemary Miller as Nurse Pat Roberts, staff nurse
- Charles Tingwell as Doctor Alan Dawson, senior house officer
- Frederick Bartman as Doctor Simon Forrester, senior house officer
- Pamela Duncan as Sister Doughty, charge sister
- Desmond Carrington as Doctor Chris Anderson, consultant in emergency medicine
- John Carlisle as Mr Lester Large, consultant general surgeon
- Ian Cullen as Mr Warren Kent, consultant general surgeon
- Peter Howell as Doctor Peter Harrison, pre-registration house officer
- Anne Lloyd as Nurse Pat Roberts, staff nurse
- Glyn Owen as Doctor Patrick O'Meara, medical registrar in cardiology
- Tricia Money as Nurse Michaela Davies, senior staff nurse
- John White as Doctor Giles Farmer
- Paula Byrne as Nurse Frances Whitney, state enrolled nurse
- Kerry Marsh as Nurse O'Keefe, student nurse
- Richard Thorp as Doctor John Rennie, consultant in emergency medicine
- Barbara Clegg as Nurse Jo Buckley, staff nurse
- Iris Russell as Matron Mary Stevenson, senior ward sister/Hospital matron
- Pik-Sen Lim as Nurse Kwei-Kim Yen, staff nurse
- Dorothy Smith as Sister McNab
- John Barron as Harold de la Roux, hospital trustee
- Kathleen Byron as Margaret de la Roux, hospital trustee
- Therese McMurray as Nurse Maureen Parkin, staff nurse
- William Wilde as Doctor Brooke, locum medical registrar in general surgery
- Jane Rossington as Nurse Katherine Ford, senior consultant nurse in general surgery
- Joan Matheson as Sister Rhys
- Lola Brooks

== See also ==
- Emergency – Ward 9, contemporary television play by Dennis Potter
