= Tanita Tikaram discography =

- Studio albums: 10
- Compilation albums: 3
- Singles: 24

This is the discography of British singer-songwriter Tanita Tikaram.

== Albums ==
=== Studio albums ===
| Title | Album details | Peak chart positions | | | | | | | | | | Certifications |
| Title | Album details | UK | AUS | AUT | CAN | GER | NL | NOR | SWE | SWI | US | Certifications |
|---|---|---|---|---|---|---|---|---|---|---|---|---|
| Ancient Heart | Released: 12 September 1988; Label: WEA; Formats: CD, LP, MC | 3 | 31 | 1 | 22 | 1 | 4 | 1 | 8 | 1 | 59 | BPI: 2× Platinum; ARIA: Gold; BVMI: 2× Platinum; GLF: Gold; IFPI SWI: Platinum; NVPI: Platinum |
| The Sweet Keeper | Released: 29 January 1990; Label: WEA; Formats: CD, LP, MC | 3 | 68 | 7 | 81 | 3 | 15 | 2 | 4 | 7 | 124 | BPI: Gold; BVMI: Gold; IFPI SWI: Gold |
| Everybody's Angel | Released: 4 February 1991; Label: WEA; Formats: CD, LP, MC | 19 | 128 | 19 | — | 17 | 20 | 12 | 16 | 12 | 142 | |
| Eleven Kinds of Loneliness | Released: 16 March 1992; Label: WEA; Formats: CD, LP, MC | — | 147 | 33 | — | — | 60 | — | — | — | — | |
| Lovers in the City | Released: 13 February 1995; Label: EastWest; Formats: CD, MC | 75 | 158 | — | — | 74 | — | — | — | 44 | — | |
| The Cappuccino Songs | Released: 7 September 1998; Label: Mother; Formats: CD, MC | 69 | — | — | — | — | — | — | — | 47 | — | |
| Sentimental | Released: 12 April 2005; Label: Naïve; Formats: CD, digital download | — | — | — | — | — | — | — | — | 87 | — | |
| Can't Go Back | Released: 31 August 2012; Label: Ear Music; Formats: CD, digital download | 147 | — | 33 | — | 50 | — | — | — | 79 | — | |
| Closer to the People | Released: 11 March 2016; Label: Ear Music; Formats: CD, LP, digital download | — (Note: Peaked at number 25 on the UK Independent Albums Chart.) | — | 68 | — | 61 | — | — | — | 84 | — | |
| LIAR (Love Isn't a Right) | Released: 10 October 2025; Label: Cooking Vinyl; Formats: CD, LP, digital download | 92 | — | — | — | — | — | — | — | 71 | — | |
"—" denotes releases that did not chart or were not released in that territory.

=== Compilation albums ===
| Title | Album details | Peak chart positions | |
| Title | Album details | UK Indie | NOR |
|---|---|---|---|
| The Best of Tanita Tikaram | Released: 2 September 1996; Label: EastWest; Formats: CD, MC | — | 18 |
| Best – Good Tradition | Released: 29 August 2008; Label: Zounds; Formats: CD; Germany-only release | — | — |
| To Drink the Rainbow – An Anthology 1988–2019 | Released: 27 September 2019; Label: Needle Mythology; Formats: CD, LP, digital download | 50 | — |
"—" denotes releases that did not chart or were not released in that territory.

== Singles ==
| Title | Year | Peak chart positions | | | | | | | | | | Album |
| Title | Year | UK | AUS | AUT | BEL (FL) | FRA | GER | IRE | NL | SWE | SWI | Album |
|---|---|---|---|---|---|---|---|---|---|---|---|---|
| "Good Tradition" | 1988 | 10 | 142 | — | 39 | — | — | 9 | 46 | 4 | — | Ancient Heart |
| "Twist in My Sobriety" | 1988 | 22 | 23 | 2 | 22 | 6 | 2 | 10 | 26 | — | 6 | Ancient Heart |
| "Cathedral Song" | 1989 | 48 | 120 | — | — | — | 71 | — | 36 | — | — | Ancient Heart |
| "World Outside Your Window" | 1989 | 58 | — | — | — | — | — | — | 80 | — | — | Ancient Heart |
| "We Almost Got It Together" | 1990 | 52 | 116 | — | 40 | — | 50 | 28 | 38 | — | — | The Sweet Keeper |
| "Little Sister Leaving Town" | 1990 | 83 | — | — | — | — | — | — | — | — | — | The Sweet Keeper |
| "Thursday's Child" | 1990 | 132 | — | — | — | — | — | — | — | — | — | The Sweet Keeper |
| "Only the Ones We Love" | 1991 | 69 | — | — | — | — | 58 | — | — | — | — | Everybody's Angel |
| "I Love the Heavens Solo" | 1991 | 112 | — | — | — | — | — | — | — | — | — | Everybody's Angel |
| "You Make the Whole World Cry" | 1992 | 92 | — | — | — | — | — | — | — | — | — | Eleven Kinds of Loneliness |
| "I Might Be Crying" | 1995 | 64 | 199 | — | — | — | — | — | — | — | — | Lovers in the City |
| "Wonderful Shadow" | 1995 | 198 | — | — | — | — | — | — | — | — | — | Lovers in the City |
| "Yodelling Song" | 1995 | — | — | — | — | — | — | — | — | — | — | Lovers in the City |
| "Twist in My Sobriety" (The Remixes) | 1996 | 81 | — | — | — | — | — | — | — | — | — | The Best of Tanita Tikaram |
| "Stop Listening" | 1998 | 67 | — | — | — | — | — | — | — | — | — | The Cappuccino Songs |
| "I Don't Wanna Lose at Love" | 1998 | 73 | — | — | — | — | — | — | — | — | — | The Cappuccino Songs |
| "And I Think of You (E penso a te)" (Italy promo-only release) | 1998 | — | — | — | — | — | — | — | — | — | — | The Cappuccino Songs |
| "If I Ever" | 1998 | — | — | — | — | — | — | — | — | — | — | The Cappuccino Songs |
| "Don't Let the Cold" (promo-only release) | 2004 | — | — | — | — | — | — | — | — | — | — | Sentimental |
| "Play Me Again" (France promo-only release) | 2004 | — | — | — | — | — | — | — | — | — | — | Sentimental |
| "Dust on My Shoes" | 2012 | — | — | — | — | — | — | — | — | — | — | Can't Go Back |
| "Glass Love Train" | 2016 | — | — | — | — | — | — | — | — | — | — | Closer to the People |
| "The Way You Move" | 2016 | — | — | — | — | — | — | — | — | — | — | Closer to the People |
| "Cool Waters" | 2017 | — | — | — | — | — | — | — | — | — | — | Closer to the People |
| "This Perfect Friend" | 2025 | — | — | — | — | — | — | — | — | — | — | LIAR |
"—" denotes releases that did not chart or were not released in that territory.
