= To Drink the Rainbow =

To Drink the Rainbow (An Anthology 1988–2019)

Compilation album by Tanita Tikaram
- Released: 27 September 2019
- Length: 54:58
- Label: Needle Mythology

Tanita Tikaram chronology
Closer to the People (2016)	To Drink the Rainbow (An Anthology 1988–2019) (2019)	LIAR (Love Isn't a Right) (2025)

To Drink the Rainbow (An Anthology 1988–2019) is a compilation album by the British singer-songwriter Tanita Tikaram, which was released by Needle Mythology in 2019.

== Background ==
To Drink the Rainbow was curated by Peter Paphides, the founder of Needle Mythology, with assistance from Tikaram. As a fan of Tikaram's work, Paphides wanted to compile a compilation that focused on her later, post-teenage work. As a result, tracks from Tikaram's first two albums, Ancient Heart (1988) and The Sweet Keeper (1990) are omitted, although an acoustic version of "Valentine Heart" is included as a bonus track.

Paphides recalled that the compilation originated as a Spotify playlist he had assembled before founding Needle Mythology. After establishing the label, he asked Tikaram for permission to release the selection as an album, and she agreed. Tikaram subsequently collaborated on the selection and contributed notes on each of the twelve songs on the main album.

The compilation was released on CD and vinyl LP, with the latter being limited edition, containing a two-track seven-inch EP, a signed lyric sheet and postcard.

Tikaram toured mainland Europe in September and October 2019 to promote the anthology.

== Critical reception ==
In a 2019 retrospective on the top 100 reissues, soundtracks and compilations of the year, The Quietus listed To Drink the Rainbow at number 80. The same year, in an article about "conversation starters", Monocle praised the anthology's selection of twelve "standout" songs. In a 2025 interview with Tikaram, Luke Turner of The Quietus described the anthology as an "excellent primer" to her work.

== Track listing ==
No.	Title	Writer(s)	Length
1.	"My Love (Acoustic)"	Tanita Tikaram	3:49
2.	"Play Me Again"	Tikaram	3:47
3.	"Cool Waters"	Tikaram, Martin Winning	4:12
4.	"Only the Ones We Love"	Tikaram	2:53
5.	"Trouble"	Tikaram	3:57
6.	"I Think of You - E Penso A Te"	Lucio Battisti, Mogol	4:19
7.	"The Way You Move"	Tikaram, Bryan Day	2:54
8.	"Love Is Just a Word"	Tikaram	3:40
9.	"Amore Si"	Tikaram, Marco Sabiu	4:01
10.	"To Drink the Rainbow (Acoustic)"	Tikaram	3:34
11.	"Can't Go Back"	Tikaram, Mark Creswell	3:51
12.	"Every Day Is New"	Tikaram	4:07

Bonus tracks
No.	Title	Writer(s)	Length
13.	"Glass Love Train (L.A. Version)"	Tikaram, Creswell	5:00
14.	"Valentine Heart (Acoustic)"	Tikaram	4:13

== Personnel ==
- Tanita Tikaram - liner notes
- Pete Paphides - curator, sleeve notes
- James at schein.co.uk - design
- Natacha Horn - photography

Production

- Mark Creswell - producer (tracks 1, 10, 14)
- Tanita Tikaram - producer (tracks 2, 4, 5, 8, 12)
- Neil Brockbank - producer (tracks 2, 8, 12)
- Angie Pollock, Goetz Botzenhardt - producers (tracks 3, 7)
- Peter Van Hooke, Rod Argent - producers (track 4)
- Charlie Mallozzi, Marco Sabiu - producers (tracks 6, 9)
- Paul Bryan - producer (tracks 11, 13)
- Miles Showell - mastering, remastering

== Charts ==
Chart (2019)	Peak position
UK Independent Albums (Official Charts)	50
