= Can't Go Back (album) =

Studio album by Tanita Tikaram
- Released: 3 September 2012
- Recorded: July 2010
- Studios: Stampede Origin (Culver City, CA); The Sound Factory (Los Angeles, CA)
- Length: 38:50
- Label: Ear Music
- Producer: Paul Bryan

Tanita Tikaram chronology
Sentimental (2005)	Can't Go Back (2012)	Closer to the People (2016)

Professional ratings
Review scores
Source	Rating
musicOMH	4/5 stars

Can't Go Back is the eighth studio album released by the British singer Tanita Tikaram. Released in September 2012 through Ear Music (an imprint of German-based label Edel Music), the album marked Tikaram's first album in 7 years, after 2005's Sentimental.

== Background ==
Taking another seven-year gap after her last record, Tikaram said she wanted to record an album that mixed her new-found love for Americana, Motown and Chess music, and that it took her that long to record it because she had a couple of false starts with different producers that did not work, before eventually setting with Paul Bryan. She co-wrote all the songs on the album with her longtime guitarist Mark Creswell, and recorded the ten songs that form the album in Los Angeles with producer Paul Bryan in just 6 days, in July 2010. Grant Lee Phillips has guest vocals on two songs on the album.

In July 2014, Tikaram made available as a free download an unreleased song from those sessions. The track, titled "When I Dream", was not included on the album because she felt it was too dark.

== Release and reception ==
A special edition of the album includes a second CD with songs from Tikaram's back catalogue in an acoustic version. Most of these songs had been available on Tikaram's website as podcasts over the past two years. Eagle Records distributed the album in the US, making it the first Tikaram record to be released in the United States since 1995's Lovers in the City.

"Dust on My Shoes" was chosen as the first single, and was released as a digital download several months prior to the album, in May 2012. "All Things To You" was released as a second promo-only single in Belgium.

In 2012, it was awarded a silver certification from the Independent Music Companies Association, which indicated sales of at least 20,000 copies throughout Europe.

== Track listing ==
No.	Title	Length
1.	"All Things to You"	4:14
2.	"Dust on My Shoes"	4:29
3.	"Make the Day"	5:08
4.	"Rock n' Roll"	3:11
5.	"Science"	2:47
6.	"Keep It Real"	4:37
7.	"Can't Go Back"	3:51
8.	"Heavy Pressure"	3:34
9.	"One Kiss"	3:07
10.	"If the World Should Want for Love"	3:46

Special edition bonus disc
No.	Title	Length
1.	"My Love"	3:46
2.	"Valentine Heart"	4:11
3.	"Wonderful Shadow"	5:00
4.	"Only the Ones We Love"	2:27
5.	"Twist in My Sobriety"	4:32
6.	"To Drink the Rainbow"	3:31
7.	"Play Me Again"	4:05
8.	"Love Is Just a Word"	4:05

== Personnel ==
- Tanita Tikaram – vocals, writing
- Chavonne Stewart – backing vocals (track 2)
- Nava Morris – backing vocals (track 2)
- Paul Bryan – producer, bass, Mellotron (M4000), Chamberlin, vocals (track 9), backing vocals
- Alexander Mertsch – design and photo retouching
- Jay Bellerose – drums and percussion
- Mark Creswell – acoustic and electric guitars, backing vocals, sequencing, writing
- Natacha Horn – photography
- Sylvie Bardet – photography, backing vocals (track 6)
- Keefus Ciancia – piano, keyboards, synthesizer
- Ryan Freeland – recording, mixing and mastering, backing vocals (track 6)
- Jason Mott – technician
- Grant-Lee Phillips – vocals (tracks 1 and 6)

== Charts ==
Chart performance for Can't Go Back
Chart (2012)	Peak position
Austrian Albums (Ö3 Austria)	33
Belgian Albums (Ultratop Flanders)	141
Belgian Albums (Ultratop Wallonia)	77
German Albums (Offizielle Top 100)	50
Swiss Albums (Schweizer Hitparade)	79
UK Albums (OCC)	147
UK Independent Albums (Official Charts)	21
