= Faithless (Richard Thompson album) =

Live album by Richard Thompson
- Released: July 2004
- Recorded: March 1985
- Venue: United States
- Genre: Rock
- Length: 75:18
- Label: Beeswing
- Producer: Edward Haber

Richard Thompson chronology
Ducknapped! (2003)	Faithless (2004)	The Chrono Show (2004)

Faithless is a live album by English singer, songwriter, and guitarist Richard Thompson. Released in 2004 on Thompson's own Beeswing label, it is compiled from recordings made during Thompson's 1985 tour in support of his Across a Crowded Room album, and consequently features six of the nine songs from that album.

The backing band for the 1985 tour included the duo of Clive Gregson and Christine Collister whose vocals had been a feature of Across A Crowded Room. The band line-up for this tour placed most of the burden for instrument colour on Thompson and his guitar playing, but Gregson trades solos with Thompson on "Tear Stained Letter".

== Track listing ==
All songs composed by Richard Thompson, except "Skull and Cross Bones" by Barbara Morgan and "Did She Jump or Was She Pushed" by Richard and Linda Thompson.

1. "Fire in the Engine Room"
2. "Nearly In Love"
3. "Did She Jump or Was She Pushed"
4. "You Don't Say"
5. "For Shame of Doing Wrong"
6. "Little Blue Number"
7. "How I Wanted To"
8. "I Ain't Going to Drag My Feet No More"
9. "Shoot Out the Lights"
10. "She Twists the Knife Again"
11. "Love in a Faithless Country"
12. "Wall of Death"
13. "Tear Stained Letter"
14. "Withered and Died"
15. "Skull and Cross Bones"

== Personnel ==
- Richard Thompson – guitar and vocals
- Clive Gregson – guitar, backing vocals and electric organ
- Christine Collister – backing vocals, percussion and acoustic guitar on Wall Of Death
- Gerry Conway – drums
- Rory McFarlane – bass guitar and backing vocals
