= Glass Love Train =

Single by Tanita Tikaram

from the album Closer to the People
- Released: 22 January 2016
- Length: 4:36
- Label: Earmusic
- Songwriters: Mark Cresswell; Tanita Tikaram
- Producers: Angie Pollock, Goetz Botzenhardt

Tanita Tikaram singles chronology
"Dust on My Shoes" (2012)	"Glass Love Train" (2016)	"The Way You Move" (2016)

"Glass Love Train" is a song recorded by British singer and songwriter Tanita Tikaram. Earmusic released the song on 22 January 2016 as the lead single from her ninth studio album Closer to the People.

== Background ==
Tikaram explained that "The lyrics take the idea of someone travelling, reflecting on a love story – with subtle changes & insights mirroring the way the landscape changes when you are on a train." A newer version of the song was also included in her 2019 compilation album To Drink the Rainbow as a bonus track.
