= The Cappuccino Songs =

Studio album by Tanita Tikaram
- Released: 7 September 1998
- Recorded: July 1996 – May 1997
- Studio: The Apartment Studios (London, England); Livingston Recording Studios (London, England); Master Rock Studios (London, England); Pig Sound Studios (Forli, Italy); Roundhouse Studios (London, England)
- Genre: Rock, pop, folk
- Length: 41:14
- Label: Mother
- Producer: Marco Sabiu; Charlie Mallozzi

Tanita Tikaram chronology
The Best of Tanita Tikaram (1996)	The Cappuccino Songs (1998)	Sentimental (2005)

The Cappuccino Songs is the sixth studio album by the British singer-songwriter Tanita Tikaram, released by Mother in 1998.

== Background ==
"It sounds clichéd but there is something romantic about the entire Mediterranean lifestyle. Cappuccino is not just a drink, the whole culture around it is sexy."

— Tanita Tikaram discussing the album's central theme.

In 1996, Tikaram left WEA, her label of eight years, and spent some time pursuing other interests than music, including art and travel. For her next studio album, Tikaram decided to re-evaluate her musical direction and reinvent her image. She signed to a new label, Mother Records, and found new management. On this album, Tikaram chose to work with Italian musician Marco Sabiu, who produced the album and co-wrote seven of the tracks. The two had first worked together in 1996, when Sabiu and his producing partner Charlie Mallozzi (known collectively as The Rapino Brothers) produced Tikaram's version of "And I Think of You - E penso a te", which was included on The Best of Tanita Tikaram. The pair's collaboration resulted in an album with a distinctively poppier, more electronic sound than Tikaram's earlier folk-rock releases.

Speaking of her collaboration with Sabiu, Tikaram revealed in 1998,

"Working with Marco was a real joy. He was serious about the music but had a great sense of humour that stopped me taking it all too seriously. Marco's classically trained but he's not patronising. He loves pop music and trying to communicate things in the simplest way he can. That's what all good pop music is. Marco works just like me [and] being in the studio was very natural. We talked about things in the same way, we describe music in the same way."

Like on her previous album, 1995's Lovers in the City, Tikaram collaborated with the London Session Orchestra for the string sections on her new album. She also recorded ABBA's "The Day Before You Came", one of the few times she has covered another artist's song. In 1998, she described her version as "a bit spooky, a bit weird, almost electro". She added that "Amore Si" has a "very kitsch, melodramatic love story", and "Back in Your Arms" and "If I Ever" are "straight European pop songs, with a twist". "I Don't Want to Lose at Love" samples the 1992 song "Seelinnikoi" by the Finnish folk music band Värttinä, who receive a co-writing credit.

In later years, Tikaram has described The Cappuccino Songs as her "poppiest album" but one which she feels some ambivalence towards. She revealed in 2020, "The record company got very excited and brought in a star producer. To be honest, the whole thing became a bit of a nightmare for me and Marco, so much so that I sort of blanked the album out of my mind. My ambivalence about some of the songs stems from the feeling that some are 'well-written' as oppose[d] to [being] written from the heart. Perhaps a lack of identity is a risk you take in a collaboration." However, she added that on reflection she enjoys the album's "Europeanness", "variety" and Sabiu's "fabulous" arrangements.

== Release ==
The Cappuccino Songs was released in continental Europe and Japan. After promotion of this album ended, Tikaram was let go from Mother Records and retired from the music scene for several years. Three singles were released from the album: "Stop Listening", "I Don't Wanna Lose at Love" and "If I Ever". The Italian and Japanese pressings of the album featured "And I Think of You - E penso a te" as a bonus track, and it was released as a promotional single in Italy in late 1998.

== Critical reception ==
Professional ratings
Review scores
Source	Rating
AllMusic	3/5 stars
The Guardian	3/5 stars
Melody Maker	0/5 stars
NME	4/10
Select	3/5 stars

On its release, David Cheal of The Daily Telegraph praised The Cappuccino Songs as "a collection of sultry and evocative songs about love and yearning from the woman with the golden larynx". He also praised the "greater range and variety of styles and instrumentation" on the album in comparison to Tikaram's previous releases. Caroline Sullivan of The Guardian described the album as "surprisingly modern by the sombre songstress's standards" and "better than you'd expect". She added that the use of "sharp Latin horns, bumpy percussion and silky strings is an attractive change from the guitar-shaped blandness of before". Neil Mason of Melody Maker gave the album zero stars out of five, writing: "Even the coffee tables of the world are running for the hills [...] Eighties jokers Blancmange managed a better job. Yup, that bad."

== Track listing ==
All tracks are written by Tanita Tikaram and Marco Sabiu except where noted.

No.	Title	Writer(s)	Length
1.	"Stop Listening"		4:23
2.	"Light Up My World"	Tikaram	3:36
3.	"Amore si"		4:02
4.	"Back in Your Arms"		4:01
5.	"The Cappuccino Song"		3:50
6.	"I Don't Wanna Lose at Love"	Tikaram, Sabiu, Värttinä	4:20
7.	"The Day Before You Came"	Benny Andersson, Björn Ulvaeus	4:25
8.	"If I Ever"		3:41
9.	"I Like This"		3:58
10.	"I Knew You"	Tikaram	4:58

UK bonus track
No.	Title	Length
11.	"I Don't Wanna Lose at Love" (Single Version)	3:53

Italian bonus track
No.	Title	Writer(s)	Length
11.	"And I Think of You - E penso a te"	Lucio Battisti, Mogol	4:17

Japanese bonus tracks
No.	Title	Length
11.	"And I Think of You - E penso a te"	4:17
12.	"Feeling Is Gone"	3:21

== Personnel ==
- Tanita Tikaram – vocals, acoustic guitar
- Marco Sabiu – piano, keyboards, computer programming, string arrangements
- Luís Jardim – bass, drums, percussion, vocals
- Mark Shulman, Rick Fenn – acoustic guitar
- Alessandro Cortini – guitar
- John Themis – guitar
- John Crawford – piano
- Tony Levin – bass
- Tubbs – bass
- Andy Duncan – drums, percussion
- Daniele de Gregorio – drums, percussion
- Robin Jones – congas
- João Bosco – bongos
- Adam Riley – timbales
- Andy Caine – backing vocals
- London Session Orchestra – strings
- Gavyn Wright – conductor

=== Production ===
- Marco Sabiu – producer (all tracks)
- Charlie Mallozzi – producer (track 7)
- Rafe McKenna – mixing (all tracks)
- Stephen Lironi – additional production and mixing (track 11)
- Jeremy Gill, John Musgrave, Richard Woodcroft, Savvas Iossifidus – assistant engineers
- Chris Blair, Ray Staff – mastering

== Charts ==
Chart (1998)	Peak position
Swiss Albums (Schweizer Hitparade)	47
UK Albums (OCC)	69
