= Stop Listening =

Single by Tanita Tikaram

from the album The Cappuccino Songs
- Released: 18 May 1998
- Studio: The Apartment Studios (London, England); Livingston Recording Studios (London, England); Master Rock Studios (London, England); Pig Sound Studios (Forli, Italy); Roundhouse Studios (London, England)
- Length: 4:23
- Label: Mother Records
- Songwriters: Tanita Tikaram, Marco Sabiu
- Producer: Marco Sabiu

Tanita Tikaram singles chronology
| "And I Think of You - E penso a te" (1996) | "Stop Listening" (1998) | "I Don't Wanna Lose At Love" (1998) |

"Stop Listening" is a song by British singer-songwriter Tanita Tikaram, which was released in 1998 as the lead single from her sixth studio album The Cappuccino Songs. The song was written by Tikaram and Marco Sabiu, and produced by Sabiu. "Stop Listening" reached No. 67 on the UK Singles Chart and remained in the Top 100 for two weeks.

"Stop Listening" was Tikaram's first recording for her new record label, Mother Records. Included as b-sides on the single are re-recorded "electronic" versions of her hit singles "Good Tradition" and "Twist in My Sobriety", and the previously unreleased "Feeling Is Gone".

In a 1998 Polydor press release, Tikaram described "Stop Listening" as being "about still loving somebody with whom you have nothing left in common, being pulled this way and that way. Not being able to speak to somebody who you love is so awful."

== Critical reception ==
Upon its release as a single, Music Week announced that Tikaram is "back with a richer, fuller sound" and commented, "She's as dark and moody as ever, conveying her thoughts with her trademark breathy style, and the introduction of strings by producer Marco Sabiu adds a new layer to her sound. Matching the success of 'Good Tradition' will be tough, but this is her best single since her early hits." Andrew Hirst of the Huddersfield Daily Examiner wrote, "It's 10 years since she shot to fame with her dark, deep voice and the depressing-sounding deadpan single 'Twist in My Sobriety'. She's not lightened up much – this is the sad and sorry tale about a crumbling relationship." In a review of The Cappuccino Songs, NME felt the song was "heavy with distress and the imminent threat of Tanita bursting into tears".

== Releases ==
=== UK #1 CD single ===
1. "Stop Listening" – 3:54
2. "The Cappuccino Song" – 3:50
3. "Feeling Is Gone" – 3:23
4. "Stop Listening" (Directors Cut) – 7:29

=== UK #2 and Europe CD single ===
1. "Stop Listening" – 3:54
2. "Twist In My Sobriety" – 3:18
3. "Good Tradition" – 3:28

=== UK Cassette single ===
1. "Stop Listening" – 3:54
2. "Twist In My Sobriety" – 3:18

=== UK promo 12-inch single ===
1. "Stop Listening" (Dub Maraglio) – 5:40
2. "Stop Listening" (Purple Haze Mix) – 5:57
3. "Stop Listening" (Directors Cut) – 7:30
4. "Stop Listening" (Directors Dub) – 6:25

== Charts ==
| Chart (1998) | Peak position |
|---|---|
| UK Singles Chart | 67 |
| Scottish Singles Sales (Official Charts) | 56 |
