= We Almost Got It Together =

Single by Tanita Tikaram

from the album The Sweet Keeper
- B-side: "Love Story"
- Released: 2 January 1990
- Recorded: October 1988
- Studio: Red House Studios (Silcoe, England)
- Genre: Folk rock
- Label: East West Records
- Songwriter: Tanita Tikaram
- Producers: Peter van Hooke; Rod Argent

Tanita Tikaram singles chronology
"World Outside Your Window" (1989)	"We Almost Got It Together" (1990)	"Little Sister Leaving Town" (1990)

"We Almost Got It Together" is a song by British singer-songwriter Tanita Tikaram, released in 1990 as the lead single from her second studio album, The Sweet Keeper (1990). It was written by Tikaram, and produced by Peter van Hooke and Rod Argent. The song was a top 40 hit in Iceland, Finland, Ireland, Italy, Belgium and the Netherlands.

== Critical reception ==
Upon its release, Adam Sweeting of The Guardian commented: "The single suggests that for the time being, the Basingstoke Balladress is sticking to the tried and true. It's pleasantly uptempo and has a saxophone on it to offset Tanita's brown, sombre voice, though it's unlikely to gain admission to anybody's list of all-time classics." Simon Frith of The Observer noted: "Tikaram hasn't been changed at all by success - she's still gloomy in an overblown, wordy, sweeping sort of way."

Music & Media wrote: "A jolly song with an uptempo feel and catchy guitar riff. Radio friendly and very pleasant." Tim Southwell of Record Mirror praised the song for being more similar to the "majestic" "Good Tradition" rather than Tikaram's following singles which Southwell felt contained lyrics "that made most of the country want to hide in their sleeping bags". He described "We Almost Got It Together" as "an important step back in the right direction of pure pop rather than crass self-indulgence".

In a review of The Sweet Keeper, Jasmine Hightower of The Daily Tar Heel described the song as a "charming, happy-go-lucky song with an even beat that glides through the air and gently purrs into the ear." David Okamoto of the Tampa Bay Times noted the song's "chugging guitars" and "soulful saxophone solo". He added: "[It's] the album's most engaging track and joins her previous LP's "Good Tradition" and "World Outside Your Window" as convincing proof of her remarkably keen pop sense." Brent Ainsworth of the Santa Cruz Sentinel considered the song a "lame, unsexy love song with a pitifully sophomoric melody."

== Track listing ==
- 7" and cassette single
  1. "We Almost Got It Together" - 3:59
  2. "Love Story" - 3:16
- 12" and CD single
  1. "We Almost Got It Together" - 3:59
  2. "Love Story" - 3:16
  3. "Over You All" (Studio Version) - 3:17
- CD single
  1. "We Almost Got It Together" - 3:59
  2. "Love Story" - 3:16
  3. "Over You All" (Studio Version) - 3:17
  4. "Rose on Wood" - 4:30
- CD single (US promo)
  1. "We Almost Got It Together" (LP Version) - 3:59

== Personnel ==
- Tanita Tikaram - vocals
- Mark Creswell - guitar
- Rod Argent - keyboards
- Richie Buckley - tenor saxophone
- Rory McFarlane - bass
- Peter Van Hooke - drums

Production

- Peter van Hooke, Rod Argent - producers, mixing
- Simon Hurrell - engineer, mixing

Other

- T & CP Associates - design, illustration
- Deborah Feingold - photography

== Charts ==
Chart (1990)	Peak position
Australia (ARIA)	116
Belgium (Ultratop Flanders)	40
Canada Top Singles (RPM)	89
European Airplay (European Hit Radio)	3
Finland (Suomen virallinen lista)	24
Iceland (Íslenski Listinn Topp 10)	7
Ireland (IRMA)	28
Italy (Musica e dischi)	22
Italy Airplay (Music & Media)	1
Netherlands (Dutch Top 40)	34
Netherlands (Single Top 100)	38
Quebec (ADISQ)	34
UK Singles (OCC)	52
West Germany (GfK Entertainment Charts)	50
