= Paul Charles (disambiguation) =

Paul Charles is a British novelist, music promoter and talent agent.

Paul Charles may also refer to:

- Paul Charles (actor), see After Dark (magazine)
- Paul Charles, Belgian politician, on List of ministers of the Belgian Congo

== See also ==
- RuPaul Andre Charles, American actor, drag queen, model, author, and singer-songwriter
