= I Don't Wanna Lose at Love =

"I Don't Wanna Lose At Love"

Single by Tanita Tikaram

from the album The Cappuccino Songs
- A-side: "I Don't Wanna Lose At Love"
- B-side: "Only One Boy in the Crowd, In Your Time"
- Released: 17 August 1998
- Recorded: January 1997
- Genre: Folk rock
- Length: 3:56 (radio version) 4:20 (album version)
- Label: Mother Records
- Songwriters: Tanita Tikaram, Marco Sabiu, Värttinä
- Producer: Marco Sabiu

Tanita Tikaram singles chronology
"Stop Listening" (1998)	"I Don't Wanna Lose At Love" (1998)	"If I Ever" (1998)

"I Don't Wanna Lose At Love" is the second single to be released from Tanita Tikaram's sixth studio album The Cappuccino Songs.

== Background ==
"I Don't Wanna Lose at Love" has a distinctive string intro, which is looped throughout the song, that is sampled from Finnish folk-rock band Värttinä's 1992 song "Seelinnikoi". The group received a credit as co-writers of the song.

Released as the second single of Tikaram's album The Cappuccino Songs, the single mix differs from the album version, and was given a poppier sound by Stephen Lironi. The song was given additional remixes by noted remixers of Indian ascent Asian Dub Foundation and Talvin Singh.

The single was released as a two-part CD in the UK. It peaked at #73 there, and to date it's Tikaram's last single to chart in that country.

== Critical reception ==
Upon its release as a single, Steve Ashford of the Gwent Gazette commented, "Well, what next? A Tanita Tikaram single that is actually quite good! And what's more, featuring an Asian Dub Foundation re-mix! Duck... there goes that flying pig!" Andrew Hirst of the Huddersfield Daily Examiner was less positive, writing, "Her dull tones sounded depressing when she became an overnight star a decade ago. She doesn't seem to have cheered up much – and the Finnish string quartet hardly help."

== Releases ==
- UK CD single 1
  1. "I Don't Wanna Lose At Love" (Radio Version) — 3:56
  2. "I Don't Wanna Lose At Love" (Love Loss Asian Dub Foundation Remix) — 4:28
  3. "In Your Time" — 3:46
- UK CD single 2
  1. "I Don't Wanna Lose At Love" (Radio Version) — 3:56
  2. "I Don't Wanna Lose At Love" (XT Talvin Singh Mix) — 7:18
  3. "Only One Boy In The Crowd" - 3:38

== Charts ==
Chart (1998)	Peak position
UK Singles (OCC)	73
Scotland Singles (OCC)	65
