= You Make the Whole World Cry =

Single by Tanita Tikaram

from the album Eleven Kinds of Loneliness
- Released: 17 February 1992
- Length: 3:41
- Label: East West
- Songwriter: Tanita Tikaram
- Producer: Tanita Tikaram

Tanita Tikaram singles chronology
"I Love the Heaven's Solo" (1991)	"You Make the Whole World Cry" (1992)	"I Might Be Crying" (1995)

Music video
- "You Make the Whole World Cry" on YouTube

"You Make the Whole World Cry" is a song by British singer and musician Tanita Tikaram, released by East West on 17 February 1992 as the only single from her fourth studio album, Eleven Kinds of Loneliness. The song, which was written and produced by Tikaram, peaked at number 92 in the UK Singles Chart.

== Background ==
Speaking to Brum Beat in 1992, Tikaram revealed, "'You Make the Whole World Cry' is about suddenly realising that although you thought you were, you're not in control and you don't know what to do."

== Music video ==
The song's music video was directed by Tony Kaye and was shot in Los Angeles. It featured Tikaram in a number of costumes, one of which portrayed the fictional character Tin Woodman. In a 1992 interview, Tikaram stated, "In the space of those three or four days shooting, changing [costumes] all the time, it actually makes you see yourself in different ways. It's very odd, but I did enjoy [it]. I felt much more comfortable doing this video than any video I've done." Tikaram returned to London after the shoot, but had to fly back out to Los Angeles to film more after around half of the footage was accidentally destroyed.

== Critical reception ==
Upon its release as a single, Music & Media noted the song's "rumbling drums" and felt the track "shows [Tikaram's] move into Walker Brothers territory". Peter Kinghorn of the Newcastle Evening Chronicle considered it to show Tikaram's "huskily moody voice at its expressive best". Jim Lawn of the Lennox Herald stated, "A plaintive cry with a slow burning build-up which combine brilliantly to suggest a massive hit!" Cool FM presenter John Kearns, writing for the News Letter, was mixed in his review, remarking, "Sure, all the right bits are in the right places and the production is excellent, but, if only she would put even a hint of a smile into a song, she could appeal to a much wider audience. Then again, maybe she has no desire to be 'commercial'."

David Stubbs of Melody Maker was critical of the song, writing, "This time, she's produced herself, embellishing her exercise-book poetry with a Phil Spector production that bursts in like the cavalry when her larynx seems just about to give out. I predict small things for this one." Penny Kiley of Liverpool Echo described it as "over-produced" and added, "It is hard to pick out a song or tune, and Tanita's voice, sometimes so effective, just seems to be droning on this." Patrick O'Flynn of the Hull Daily Mail gave a two star rating and called it "uninspiring". He commented, "Released with two new acoustic tracks on the B-side, 'You Make the Whole World Cry' disappoints principally because Ms Tikaram seems to believe she can sustain a career simply by looking and sounding depressed." Graeme Anderson of the Sunderland Echo remarked that Tikaram is "still miserable" and "this dirge doesn't do justice to her wonderful voice".

In a review of Eleven Kinds of Loneliness, David Quantick of NME noted it "builds up in a weird sort of Leonard Cohen-meets-the-Eurythmics manner". Adam Sweeting of The Guardian felt "both tune and lyrics are buried under thundering timpani". Len Righi of The Morning Call described the "edgy, falling-in-love song" as "Spectoresque in the best sense".

== Track listing ==
7" and cassette
No.	Title	Length
1.	"You Make the Whole World Cry"	3:41
2.	"Rock Me 'Til I Stop"	4:29
3.	"Me, You & Lucifer"	3:35

CD
No.	Title	Length
1.	"You Make the Whole World Cry"	3:41
2.	"Me, You & Lucifer"	3:36
3.	"This Stranger" (Alternate Version)	3:07

== Credits and personnel ==
- Tanita Tikaram – vocals, backing vocals, guitar
- David Hayes – guitar, bass
- Mark Creswell – guitar
- Bob Noble, Rod Argent – keyboards
- Richie Buckley – saxophone
- Nic France – drums, percussion

=== Production ===
- Tanita Tikaram – producer
- Simon Hurrell – engineer, mixing
- Mark Creswell, Nic France – mixing
- Tim Young – mastering
- Peter Van Hooke, Rod Argent – producers of "This Stranger"

=== Other ===
- Stefano Massei – photography
- Bill Smith Studio – design

== Charts ==
Chart (1992)	Peak position
UK Singles Chart (OCC)	92
