= Ducknapped! =

Live album by Richard Thompson
- Released: July 2003
- Recorded: March 2003 in UK; May 2003 in US
- Genre: Rock
- Length: 73:51
- Label: Beeswing
- Producer: Tom Dube

Richard Thompson chronology
1000 Years of Popular Music (2003)	Ducknapped! (2003)	Faithless (2004)

Professional ratings
Review scores
Source	Rating
Greenman Review	(not rated)
Encyclopedia of Popular Music	3/5 stars

Ducknapped! is a live album by the Richard Thompson Band, recorded during the 2003 tour to support the album The Old Kit Bag, and released on Thompson's boutique Beeswing label. As with most of Thompson's recent live releases from a tour supporting a new album, that album is heavily featured, with nine of The Old Kit Bag's twelve songs being included.

The title is derived from the joke 'ducknapping' of the tour mascot, a stuffed duck, and the subsequent backstage appearance of cod ransom notes.

None of the tracks on the album are included on the Live in Providence DVD which was shot on the same tour. Live in Providence features Rory McFarlane on bass guitar and double bass. Danny Thompson (no relation) was first choice bassist for the 2003 tour and plays on most tracks on this album, but after he was taken ill McFarlane replaced him.

== Track listing ==
All songs composed by Richard Thompson

1. "Gethsemane"
2. "Pearly Jim"
3. "Outside of the Inside"
4. "Missie How You Let Me Down"
5. "A Love You Can't Survive"
6. "One Door Opens"
7. "I’ll Tag Along"
8. "Bank Vault In Heaven"
9. "She Said It Was Destiny"
10. "I Misunderstood"
11. "Valerie"
12. "Can't Win"
13. "Jealous Words"
14. "Word Unspoken, Sight Unseen"

== Personnel ==
- Richard Thompson – guitar and vocals
- Earl Harvin – drums and dumbek
- Danny Thompson – double bass
- Judith Owen – backing vocals on One Door Opens, Jealous Words and Word Unspoken, Sight Unseen.
- Christine Collister – backing vocals on Bank Vault In Heaven and Can't Win
- Rory McFarlane – bass guitar
- Pete Zorn – backing vocals, acoustic guitar, mandolin, baritone saxophone and bass flute

== Recording venues ==
- 6 March 2003 Queen's Hall, Edinburgh
- 7 March 2003 Warwick Arts Centre Hall, Warwick
- 9 March 2003 The Dome, Brighton
- 10 March 2003 Corn Exchange, Cambridge
- 11 March 2003 Shepherd's Bush Empire, London
- 12 March 2003 Colston Hall, Bristol
- 13 March 2003 The Anvil, Basingstoke
- 17 & 25 May 2003 Los Angeles and Yosemite National Park, California
