= The Way You Move (Tanita Tikaram song) =

Single by Tanita Tikaram

from the album Closer to the People
- Released: 22 April 2016
- Genre: Pop
- Length: 2:53
- Label: Earmusic
- Songwriter(s): Bryan Day; Tanita Tikaram
- Producer(s): Angie Pollock, Goetz Botzenhardt

Tanita Tikaram singles chronology
"Glass Love Train" (2016)	"The Way You Move" (2016)

"The Way You Move" is a song recorded by British singer and songwriter Tanita Tikaram. Earmusic released the song on 22 April 2016 as the second single from her ninth studio album Closer to the People. Later, the song was also included in her 2019 compilation album To Drink the Rainbow.

== Music video ==
The song's music video was directed by Natacha Horn and produced by Tash Production London. It was shot in Kings Place, and features the dancers Alessio Cappelli and Aline Derderian, with choreography by Derderian.

== Reception ==
The review by Reuters stated, "Known for her husky voice, the 46-year old told Reuters her latest track 'The Way You Move' is a lighthearted track, celebrating the way people move". Classic Pop review added, "'The Way You Move' just wants to make you dance and feel happy. There is a lot of sadness in the world at the moment and I wanted to write a song that would make people happy, even for a minute or two, a song that everyone can dance to."

== Track listing ==
All tracks are written by Bryan Day, Tanita Tikaram

No.	Title	Length
1.	"The Way You Move"	2:53
