= Cyber City Oedo 808 =

1990 cyberpunk original video animation series

- Japanese OVA poster, featuring (clockwise from left) Benten, Gogul, and Sengoku

サイバーシティ OEDO 808
- Genre: Cyberpunk, action, tech noir
- Original video animation
- Directed by: Yoshiaki Kawajiri
- Produced by: Makoto Seya; Yasuteru Iwase
- Written by: Akinori Endo
- Music by: Kazz Toyama; Rory McFarlane (UK version)
- Studio: Madhouse
- Licensed by: AUS: Madman Entertainment (Note: Previously licensed by Manga Entertainment); NA: Discotek Media (Note: Previously licensed by U.S. Manga Corp); UK: Anime Limited (Note: Previously licensed by Manga Entertainment)
- Released: June 21, 1990 – October 4, 1991
- Runtime: 45 minutes (each)
- Episodes: 3

Cyber City Oedo 808 (Japanese: サイバーシティ OEDO 808) is a three-part Japanese cyberpunk anime series released from 1990 to 1991. It is composed of a three-part original video animation (OVA) directed by Yoshiaki Kawajiri and produced by Madhouse; a three-volume novel written by Akinori Endô and illustrated by Kawajiri and Hiroshi Hamasaki; and a PC Engine video game developed by Nippon Computer System. Set in the year 2808, the series follows three convicts who are enlisted to apprehend cybercriminals in exchange for reduced sentences. Cyber City Oedo 808 has achieved an international cult following as an influential work in the cyberpunk genre, and has been hailed as one of the greatest cyberpunk anime series of all time.

== Synopsis ==
In 2808, the Japanese city of Oedo (Note: The former city of Tokyo, "Oedo" is an abbreviation of "Oriental Electric Darwinism Oasis", and is also Japanese for "Greater Edo".) has responded to rampant crime by reviving the feudal practice of hōmen (放免), or employing convicted criminals as law enforcement officers. Heavily convicted criminals Sengoku, Gogul, and Benten are offered reduced sentences in exchange for their cooperation with the Cyber Police (CP), the cybercrime division of the Oedo police force.

The three men work under CP commanding officer Juzo Hasegawa, where they participate in various investigations and earn reductions to their sentences in exchange for each criminal they apprehend. Each is armed with a jitte and an explosive collar worn around their necks, which Hasegawa can detonate remotely in the event of insubordination or a mission failure.

== Characters ==
=== Primary characters ===
Shunsuke Sengoku (千石 旬介)
Voiced by: Hiroya Ishimaru (Japanese); Bruce Martin (English)
A hot-headed young man serving a 375 year prison sentence for various armed robbery-related offenses.
Goggle (ゴーグル)
Voiced by: Tesshō Genda (Japanese); Seán Barrett (English)
The alias of Rikiya Gabimaru (蛾眉丸力也), a computer expert and hacker serving a 310 year prison sentence.
Benten (ベンテン)
Voiced by: Kaneto Shiozawa (Japanese); Daniel Flynn (English)
The alias of Merill Yanagawa (メリル・柳川), an androgynous bishōnen serving a 295 year prison sentence.
Juzo Hasegawa (長谷川十蔵)
Voiced by: Norio Wakamoto (Japanese); Bob Sherman (English)
The stern commanding officer of the Cyber Police.
Kyōko Jōnouchi (城之内京子)
Voiced by: Mitsuko Horie (Japanese); Julia Braams (English)
A junior CP officer tasked with assisting cybercriminals in their investigations. Also known by the nickname "Okyo" (オキョウ).
Varsus (ヴァーサス)
Voiced by: Kyousei Tsukui (Japanese); Nigel Greaves (English)
An armed robot who acts as a partner to the cybercriminals.

=== Additional characters ===
| Character | Japanese | English (Manga UK/CPM, 1994) |
|---|---|---|
| Dave Kurokawa (Episode 1) | Takeshi Aono | Marc Smith |
| Mishiba (Episode 2) | Osamu Saka | Marc Smith |
| Sarah (Episode 2) | Yoshiko Sakakibara | Tamsin Hollo |
| Kazuo Shiroyama (Episode 2) | Banjō Ginga | Eric Flynn |
| Remi Masuda (Episode 3) | Emi Shinohara | Teresa Gallagher |
| Shūzō Saionji (Episode 3) | Unshō Ishizuka | Marc Smith |
| Kelley Takakura (Episode 3) | Ako Mayama | Lorelei King |

== Media ==
=== Original video animation ===
| No. | Title | Original release date |
|---|---|---|
| 1 | "Memories of the Past"; Transliteration: "Inishie no Kioku" (Japanese: 古の記憶) | June 21, 1990 |
Sengoku is sent to save 50,000 people trapped in Oedo's largest skyscraper after its central computer is mysteriously taken over. Along the way, he finds that the only suspect is a dead man.
| 2 | "The Decoy Program"; Transliteration: "Otori no Kikō" (Japanese: 囮の機構) | December 28, 1990 |
Gogul's investigation of a murder pits him against an experimental military cyborg as he tries to rescue his ex-partner. Of note is that during this episode at least one other cyber-criminal is depicted trying (unsuccessfully) to remove his collar, so it is known that there are more than the three anti-heroes being employed by the Cyber Police unit.
| 3 | "Crimson Media"; Transliteration: "Kurenai no Baitai" (Japanese: 紅の媒体) | October 4, 1991 |
The freak murder of three geneticists leads Benten to investigate one man's quest for immortality, as well as finding a young woman transformed into a vampire with telekinesis because of this quest.

=== Novel ===
Cyber City Oedo 808 Volume 1, Rebellious Lone Wolf (Beowulf) (電脳都市OEDO808〈1〉反逆の孤狼(ベオウルフ), first published in December 1990.

Cyber City Oedo 808 Volume 2, Magnificent Fallen Angel (Lucifer) (電脳都市OEDO 808〈2〉華麗なる堕天使(ルシファー), first published in March 1991.

Cyber City Oedo 808 Volume 3, Warrior of the Evil Eye (Hercules of the Evil Eye) (電脳都市OEDO 808〈3〉魔眼の闘士(まがんのヘラクレス), first published in July 1991.

Written by Akinori Endō and illustrated by Yoshiaki Kawajiri (with the exception of Volume 3, which features illustrations by Hiroshi Hamasaki), the novels were published only in Japan and are currently out of print.

=== Video game ===
Cyber City Oedo 808: Attribute of the Beast (CYBER CITY OEDO 808 獣の属性, Saibāshiti Ōedo Hachimaruhachi: Kemono no Zokusei) is a graphic adventure game released on March 15, 1991, for the PC-Engine CD-ROM² by Nippon Computer System exclusively in Japan. The storyline is completely original and not an adaptation of any episode.

=== Soundtrack ===
Cyber City Oedo 808

Soundtrack album by Rory McFarlane
- Released: January 30, 1995 (United Kingdom)
- Genres: Alternative rock Synthwave; Ambient; Progressive
- Length: 46:56
- Labels: Demon Records (out of print); DSCD-808
- Producer: Rory McFarlane

The original British and Australian VHS release (released in 1994, and televised on Channel 4 in 1995) features a more rock-centric 23-track score composed by Rory McFarlane not present on the US or Japanese versions. McFarlane's score combined metal, electronica and ambient styles. It has been out of print for years and, as such, is very rare to find on CD, but it is known to be available on the internet. The UK soundtrack has a considerably different tone than the original (more pop-like) Japanese score. Due to Manga Entertainment UK losing the rights to the Cyber City series this edition of the score was unavailable on western DVD releases and remained available only on the old VHS versions from the mid nineties until Anime Limited released the movie on Blu-ray in the UK with the UK Dub and Soundtrack CD included in the release.

| No. | Title | Length |
|---|---|---|
| 1. | "Space prison" | 2:40 |
| 2. | "Kill you" | 1:25 |
| 3. | "Car chase" | 2:07 |
| 4. | "Elevator" | 1:59 |
| 5. | "Murder" | 3:10 |
| 6. | "Amachi" | 1:32 |
| 7. | "Amachi dies" | 1:00 |
| 8. | "Diving" | 1:05 |
| 9. | "Gogol" | 0:56 |
| 10. | "Trucking" | 2:03 |
| 11. | "Arena" | 2:16 |
| 12. | "Body snatchers" | 0:36 |
| 13. | "Body vault" | 1:22 |
| 14. | "Top secret" | 1:16 |
| 15. | "Sarah" | 1:05 |
| 16. | "Duel" | 2:32 |
| 17. | "Molcos dies" | 2:39 |
| 18. | "Stars" | 2:37 |
| 19. | "Search" | 1:44 |
| 20. | "Cryogenics" | 1:22 |
| 21. | "Big cats" | 3:47 |
| 22. | "Vampire" | 4:30 |
| 23. | "Closing theme" | 3:13 |

== Reception ==
Critical reception of Cyber City Oedo 808 has been generally positive, and has received a cult following over the years, with some critics hailing it as one of the greatest cyberpunk anime series of all time.

Jonathan H. Kantor of Looper.com ranked it as one of the "12 Best Cyberpunk Anime Movies", regarding it to have "elevated the genre through gripping storytelling and exceptionally well-written characters." Hemanth Kissoon of Filmulation.com reviewed the series in 2007, saying that the series "was released 17 years ago, yet still stands up as a gripping take on Japan's potential future." Stig Høgset of THEM Anime Reviews gave the series a rating of 4 out of 5 stars, with his only criticism revolving around the small amount of character development. He states that the series "rounds off a nicely paced trilogy of stories starring an intriguing cast of different characters and set in a gray, leaden metropolis. It goes from action-filled to conspiringly suspenseful and ends with a legendary battle ballet culminating in a beautiful and melancholy ending." Comic Book Resources listed Cyber City Oedo 808 as the tenth greatest cyberpunk anime series of all time, stating that the series "allows viewers to fully appreciate its striking visuals, fast-paced action, and predictable yet riveting narrative developments. Regrettably, the short runtime will undeniably leave fans wanting more, especially in the character exploration department." GameRant listed Cyber City Oedo 808 as the 16th best cyberpunk anime of all time out of a list of 22, stating that its themes give it a "tantalizing cyberpunk premise" which makes it "a fun series to get into."

The Encyclopedia of Science Fiction described CyberCity Oedo 808 as a violent cyberpunk anime whose three episodes progressively improve in quality. It criticized the first episode for plot absurdities and found the second fairly enjoyable despite the cyborg antagonist's implausible design flaw, while considering the third the strongest for its greater excitement, relatively more complex plot and more entertaining absurdities. The encyclopedia also identified RoboCop (1987) as a likely influence on the second episode and noted that the English dub became notorious for containing substantially more profanity than the Japanese original.
