= Thursday's Child (Tanita Tikaram song) =

Single by Tanita Tikaram

from the album The Sweet Keeper
- A-side: "Thursday's Child (New Version)"
- B-side: "Once & Not Speak"
- Released: 1990
- Recorded: 1989 (B1, B2) -1990(A)
- Studio: Red House Studios (Silcoe, England)
- Genre: Folk rock
- Label: East West Records
- Songwriter: Tanita Tikaram
- Producers: Tanita Tikaram; Peter van Hooke; Rod Argent

Tanita Tikaram singles chronology
"Little Sister Leaving Town" (1990)	"Thursday's Child" (1990)	"Only the Ones We Love" (1991)

"Thursday's Child" is a song by British singer-songwriter Tanita Tikaram, released in 1990 as the third and last single from her second studio album, The Sweet Keeper. A remixed version of the song was made for its release as a single.

== Critical reception ==
Upon its release as a single, Alex Kadis of Smash Hits stated, "As usual, it's a semi-slow number which she grumbles ferociously in her super-deep 'mature' voice and, as usual, no one knows what she's going on about. That said, it is one of the better Tanita Tikaram songs – very tuneful and melodious (except when she's singing)." Jim Whiteford of The Kilmarnock Standard praised it as a "strong new single" and continued, "Her album success may well cross over to the singles chart with this outing." Everett True of Melody Maker commented that Tikaram "sounds so middle-aged" and added that the song "isn't bad, it's just so menopausal". Robin Smith of Record Mirror described it as "utterly and completely turgid" and wrote, "High time Tanita's record company threw a bucket of cold water over her and told her to wake up. She's becoming so introspective that her singles are rambling off into the distance, making no impact at all."

== Track listing ==
=== 7-inch single ===
1. "Thursday's Child" (New Version) - 3:55
2. "Once and Not Speak" - 4:45

=== 12-inch and CD single ===
1. "Thursday's Child" (New Version) - 3:55
2. "Once and Not Speak" - 4:45
3. "Cathedral Song" (Live in Norway) - 3:23
