= Everybody's Angel =

Studio album by Tanita Tikaram
- Released: 4 February 1991
- Recorded: June–September 1990
- Studio: Bearsville Studios (Bearsville, NY); Groove Masters (Santa Monica, CA); Red House Studios (Silcoe, England)
- Genre: Rock, pop, folk
- Length: 48:09
- Label: East West 9031-73341-1
- Producer: Tanita Tikaram, Peter van Hooke, Rod Argent

Tanita Tikaram chronology
The Sweet Keeper (1990)	Everybody's Angel (1991)	Eleven Kinds of Loneliness (1992)

Singles from Everybody's Angel
- 1. "Only the Ones We Love" Released: 21 January 1991; 2. "I Love the Heaven's Solo" Released: 23 April 1991

Professional ratings
Review scores
Source	Rating
AllMusic	3/5 stars
Calgary Herald	B+
Chicago Tribune	2.5/4 stars
New Musical Express	2/10
Record Mirror	3/5 stars
The Rolling Stone Album Guide	1.5/5 stars
Select	2/5 stars
Sounds	1/5 stars

Everybody's Angel is the third studio album by Tanita Tikaram, released in 1991.

== Background ==
Tikaram wrote the majority of the songs that form the album between December 1989-January 1990, just before the release of her second album The Sweet Keeper, with "Hot Pork Sandwiches" dating far back to 1988.

The basic recording of the album took place in June 1990 at Bearsville Studios in Woodstock, New York. The same team of musicians that had worked on her previous two albums were brought to play for this one, including Mark Isham, Helen O'Hara and Mark Creswell. Further recordings took place at Abbey Road Studios back in England. As with her previous two albums, Rod Argent and Peter van Hooke produced the record, but for the first time Tikaram co-produced the songs as well, a move she said she had not felt confident enough to do on the previous two records. This would be the last time Tikaram collaborated with Argent and van Hooke on production.

Jennifer Warnes, of whom Tikaram had always declared being a fan, and whom Tikaram had met when Warnes attended one of her concerts at The Roxy in 1989, added harmony vocals on two songs on the album, the single "Only the Ones We Love" and "Mud in Any Water".

Two songs on the album, "Hot Pork Sandwiches" and "I Love the Heaven's Solo" had previously been released in 1990 in acoustic versions as b-sides to the single "Little Sister Leaving Town".

== Release ==
The album sold moderately well in Europe, but there was an evident decline in sales in comparison with Tikaram's previous albums, and in most territories this was the singer's last album to achieve a chart placing, including the USA. Everybody's Angel debuted and peaked at #19 in the UK, and achieved similar top 20 placings around Europe, but fell off the charts pretty quickly. In the USA, it peaked at a low #142.

Two singles were released off the album. The lead single "Only the Ones We Love", with backup vocals by Jennifer Warnes, did not become a substantial hit and only peaked at #69 in the UK. The second single, a re-recorded "I Love the Heaven's Solo" with a gospel choir, did not chart at all. The album track "Deliver Me" was touted as a possible third single (or US-only single) as it was getting a good response, but no release ever came to be.

== Reception ==
Billboard noted that

though Tikaram's vocals are as mesmerizingly somber as always, they're surrounded this time by infectious musical arrangements reminiscent of Van Morrison on many of the 14 tracks. First single, "Only The Ones We Love," is bolstered by background vocals by Jennifer Warnes. Other than the fascinating instrumentation, "Angel" also offers a more confident Tikaram who has learned to use her interesting voice to full effect.

Spin commented that

combining the husky warmth of Tracy Chapman's vocals, with the pastoral sound of recent Van Morrison, Tanita Tikaram's fine third LP promises sweet n' easy listening fun... Rich and intriguing, Everybody's Angel expands with each hearing. Nifty stuff.

In a retrospective write-up from AllMusic, Tom Demalon claimed the record

her most interesting work to date. It might be partly due to Tikaram aiding in the production. There seems to be more of a focus and maturity in the melodies and her performance seems more impassioned. The record also is given some kick by the extensive use of horns, including Mark Isham. It's easy to imagine that songs like "Deliver Me" and "This Stranger" are actually Van Morrison covers. Rod Argent's organ playing adds some muscle to "Mud in Water" and "Never Known" is a nifty reggae-inflected number. There's a jauntiness to songs like the shuffling "Hot Pork Sandwiches" that is infectious. Tikaram's voice, always the focal point, never disappoints and is simply gorgeous on the lovely opening track, "Only the Ones We Love".

== Track listing ==
All tracks composed by Tanita Tikaram

1. "Only the Ones We Love"
2. "Deliver Me"
3. "This Story in Me"
4. "To Wish This"
5. "Mud in Any Water"
6. "Sunface"
7. "Never Known"
8. "This Stranger"
9. "Swear by Me"
10. "Hot Pork Sandwiches"
11. "Me in Mind"
12. "Sometime with Me"
13. "I Love the Heaven's Solo"
14. "I'm Going Home"

== Charts ==
Chart (1991)	Peak position
Australian Albums (ARIA)	128
Austrian Albums (Ö3 Austria)	19
Danish Albums (IFPI)	7
Dutch Albums (Album Top 100)	20
European Albums (Eurotipsheet)	17
Finnish Albums (The Official Finnish Charts)	14
German Albums Chart	17
Greek Albums (IFPI Greece)	9
Irish Albums (IFPI)	10
Italian Albums (Musica e dischi)	19
Norwegian Albums (VG-lista)	12
Portuguese Albums (AFP)	6
Swedish Albums Chart	16
Swiss Albums (Schweizer Hitparade)	12
UK Albums (OCC)	19
US Billboard 200	142
US Cash Box Top 200 Albums	139

== Personnel ==
- Tanita Tikaram – guitar, vocals
- David Hayes – bass
- Mark Isham – trumpet, flugelhorn
- Jennifer Warnes – harmony vocals
- Rod Argent – piano, Hammond organ, harmony vocals, string arrangements & conductor
- James Archer – violin
- Mark Berrow – violin
- Mike Brittain – double bass
- Richie Buckley – alto & tenor saxophone
- David Emanuel – viola
- Lyn Fletcher – violin
- Wilfred Gibson – violin
- Roy Gillard – violin
- Jack Glickman – viola
- Paul Kegg – cello
- Ben Kennard – cello
- Carol Kenyon – harmony vocals
- Katie Kissoon – harmony vocals
- Andrew McGee – viola
- Jim McLeod – violin
- Helen O'Hara – violin
- Peter Oxer – violin
- Anthony Pleeth – cello
- Paul Silverthorne – viola
- Barry Wilde – violin
- Mark Creswell – guitar
- Martin Robinson – cello
