= Sentimental (Tanita Tikaram album) =

Studio album by Tanita Tikaram
- Released: 12 April 2005
- Genre: Rock, pop, folk
- Length: 40:05
- Label: Naïve 707.2317.2
- Producer: Neil Brockbank; Tanita Tikaram

Tanita Tikaram chronology
The Cappuccino Songs (1998)	Sentimental (2005)	Can't Go Back (2012)

Singles from Sentimental
- 1. "Don't Let the Cold" Released: 2005 (promo only)

Sentimental is the seventh studio album by Tanita Tikaram, released in 2005. The album was released only on the French label Naïve Records.

== Background ==
After releasing her previous album The Cappuccino Songs in 1998, Tikaram retired from the music scene and lived in Italy for a time. During the 7 year-gap between albums, she tried to start an album in the more electronic vein of her last, but she decided it wasn't working and then went on to study piano for three years, an instrument she had never learnt to play. Her piano teacher, Daniela Ronconi, eventually played several instruments on the album, as well as arranging and mixing the songs.

Sentimental sees Tikaram playing the piano on a record for the first time in her career, and not her usual instrument of choice, the guitar. She eventually decided to record the songs in a warmer, live-in-studio approach without any electronic overdubs and with her voice and the piano as the focal points. The result is Tikaram's jazziest album of her career. Tikaram described the album's sound as "groovy" without being exaggerated.

For the first time on her albums, Tikaram duetted with male singers. The record's drummer, Robert Treherne, who had never sung on record, duets with Tikaram on "Everyday Is New" and "Forever", because Tikaram heard him sing the latter song before a rehearsal and decided his voice complemented hers perfectly. Treherne, a longtime collaborator with singer Nick Lowe, brought the singer to duet with Tikaram on another song, "Don't Let the Cold". Lowe also provides a humming on "Don't Shake Me Up".

== Release ==
Tikaram, who was without a record contract, signed with French independent label Naïve Records to release the album, who distributed the record around continental Europe in April 2005. Label V2 Records released the album in the UK two months later, on June 13. The album, like her previous one, was not released in the USA.

Cover of "Don't Let The Cold" single

Three singles were released from the album, although none received a commercial release. The lead single of the album, the duet with Nick Lowe "Don't Let The Cold", was released as a promotional single all around Europe to radios and a videoclip was filmed to promote it. "Play Me Again" was released as a promotional single in France, and an edited version of "Everyday Is New" was released as a radio single in Scandinavia.

== Critical reception ==
Professional ratings
Review scores
Source	Rating
The Independent	3/5 stars

On its release, Nick Coleman of The Independent described Sentimental as a "small-scale, intimate, unfussed and unfussy treatise on the stuff of love". He added, "It's jazzy and rather solemn – both governed by the singer's soft-fingered piano style – but not in any annoying sense, and the wheezy-brown contralto that is her other special feature is just lovely."

== Track listing ==
All words and music by Tanita Tikaram.

1. "Something New"
2. "Play Me Again"
3. "My Love"
4. "Don't Shake Me Up"
5. "Everyday Is New"
6. "Love Is Just a Word"
7. "Don't Let the Cold"
8. "Forever"
9. "Got to Give You Up"
10. "Heart in Winter"

== Charts ==
Chart (2005)	Peak position
French Albums (SNEP)	90
Italian Albums (FIMI)	77
Swiss Albums (Schweizer Hitparade)	87
UK Independent Albums (OCC)	42

== Personnel ==
- Tanita Tikaram – vocals (1–10), piano (1–6, 8–10)
- Steve Donnelly – acoustic guitar (1), electric guitar (3, 10)
- Mark Creswell – bass guitar (1, 3, 5, 10), electric guitar (2, 4–9), acoustic guitar (4–7)
- Robert Trehern – drums (1–10), vocals (4, 5, 7, 8)
- Daniela Ronconi – electric piano (1, 3, 4), celeste (2, 4, 8, 9), vibraphone (5), organ (5, 8), vocals (5, 8), piano (7), tambourine (7, 8)
- Laura Di Marzio – violin (1, 3, 5, 8–10)
- Matteo Metalli – violin (1, 3, 5, 8–10)
- Aldo Maria Zangheri – viola (1, 3, 5, 8–10)
- Alessandro Culiani – cello (1, 3, 5, 8, 10)
- Daniele Rossoli – French horn (1–3, 5, 9, 10)
- Carlo Bombardi – trombone (1–3, 5, 9, 10)
- Giusepe Zanca – flicorn (1–3, 5, 9, 10)
- Raoul Ruffilli – flute (1–3, 5, 10)
- Matt Radford – bass (2, 4, 6, 7, 9)
- Giorgio Babbini – bass clarinet (2)
- Giannarelli Giordano – accordion (3)
- Nick Lowe – vocals (4, 7)
- Neil Brockbank – organ (4), bass guitar (8)
- Simone Grizzi – violin (5)
- Cristiano Pulin – violin (5)
- Alessandro Marra – violin (5)
- Carmine Rizzi – violin (5)
- Alberto de Stefani – violin (5)
- Daniele Ronconicheek – percussion (10)
- Daniela Ronconi – string, bass, and woodwind arrangements

=== Production ===
- Neil Brockbank – production, engineering, mixing
- Tanita Tikaram – production
- Daniela Ronconi – mixing
- Richard Woodcraft – engineering assistance
- Raj Das – engineering assistance
- Jack Brockbank – engineering assistance
- Paul Laventhol – engineering assistance
- Gionni Gardini – engineering assistance
- Giacomo Boschi – engineering assistance

=== Other ===
- Stéphane Gallois – photography
- Valerie Lagarde/Naïve – artwork
