= Little Sister Leaving Town =

Single by Tanita Tikaram

from the album The Sweet Keeper
- A-side: "Little Sister Leaving Town"
- B-side: "I Love The Heaven's Solo"
- Released: 26 February 1990
- Studio: Red House Studios (Silcoe, England)
- Genre: Folk rock
- Label: East West Records
- Songwriter: Tanita Tikaram
- Producers: Peter van Hooke; Rod Argent

Tanita Tikaram singles chronology
"We Almost Got It Together" (1990)	"Little Sister Leaving Town" (1990)	"Thursday's Child" (1990)

"Little Sister Leaving Town" is a song by British singer-songwriter Tanita Tikaram, released in 1990 as the second single from her second studio album The Sweet Keeper. It was written by Tikaram, and produced by Peter van Hooke and Rod Argent.

The song's music video was produced and directed by Alan Bell, and scripted by Colin Welland. It was filmed in the Yorkshire Dales.

== Critical reception ==
Upon its release, Music & Media wrote: "Pleasant, slow-moving and characteristically contemplative. The song profits from a strong arrangement. Good use of piano and strings." Everett True of Melody Maker commented: "Well, this ain't so bad – the cello's keen, and suits her mournful countenance just peachy." Andrew Collins of New Musical Express wrote, "She writes very dreary songs, of which the slow ones are by far the dreariest, and then sings them in a crap way. 'Little Sister' is a slow one. It perks up for one bar when it threatens to turn into 'Downtown Train', but this is merely a tease."

In a review of The Sweet Keeper, Robin Denselow of The Guardian described the song as "slinky and finger-clicking" which "head[s] towards soulful Van Morrison territory." Holly Crenshaw of The Atlanta Constitution described the song as "typical of the album's feel" and added: "Ms. Tikaram slowly uses the dynamics of her deep voice and evocative instrumentation to build up to an emotional chorus." Edith Lee of the Journal & Courier wrote: "Tikaram's deep, rich voice is highlighted in "Little Sister Leaving Town". She gets full music from the orchestra and bass heavy enough to make this slow song swing."

Brant Houston of the Hartford Courant commented: ""It All Came Back Today" and "Little Sister Leaving Town" are easily two of the best cuts, both with memorable choruses and each elegiac and moving." Sam Gnerre of the News-Pilot commented: "Tikaram apparently had no trouble coming up with lyrics; if anything, the songs come off as too wordy and meandering. "Little Sister Leaving Town" works by taking a less-is-more approach, but it's definitely an exception."

== Track listing ==
=== 7" single ===
1. "Little Sister Leaving Town" - 3:59
2. "Love Story" - 2:51

=== 12" and CD single ===
1. "Little Sister Leaving Town" - 3:59
2. "I Love The Heaven's Solo" - 2:51
3. "Hot Pork Sandwiches" - 4:12

=== Limited-edition CD single ===
1. "Little Sister Leaving Town" - 3:59
2. "I Love The Heaven's Solo" - 2:51
3. "Hot Pork Sandwiches" - 4:12
4. "Twist in My Sobriety" (Live) - 4:50

== Personnel ==
- Tanita Tikaram - vocals, guitar
- Rod Argent - keyboards, bass
- Peter Van Hooke - drums
- Kreisler String Orchestra

=== Production ===
- Peter van Hooke, Rod Argent - producers, mixing
- Simon Hurrell - engineer, mixing

=== Other ===
- T & CP Associates - design, illustration
- Deborah Feingold - photography

== Charts ==
Chart (1990)	Peak position
UK Singles Chart	83
