= I Might Be Crying =

Single by Tanita Tikaram

from the album Lovers in the City
- B-side: "Five Feet Away, Not Waving But Drowning"
- Released: 23 January 1995
- Genre: Folk rock
- Label: East West Records
- Songwriter: Tanita Tikaram
- Producer: Tanita Tikaram

Tanita Tikaram singles chronology
"You Make the Whole World Cry" (1992)	"I Might Be Crying" (1995)	"Wonderful Shadow" (1995)

"I Might Be Crying" is a song by British singer-songwriter Tanita Tikaram, released on 23 January 1995 as the lead single from her fifth studio album, Lovers in the City.

The song, which was written and produced by Tikaram, features backing vocals by Jennifer Warnes. "I Might Be Crying" peaked at No. 64 on the UK Singles Chart. One of the single's B-sides, "Not Waving but Drowning", is a poem by Stevie Smith set to music.

== Background ==
Speaking to the Courier-Post in 1995, Tikaram said of the song: "It's about the idea of being haunted by someone. It's about never really knowing what you have until you lose it."

== Music video ==
The song's music video was filmed in Vietnam and took a week to shoot. Tikaram told the Courier-Post: "It was really hot and poor. There's no sanitation and no real infrastructure. I took my mother along on the shoot and she said, 'This is what it was like for us 50 years ago.' I thought it was good that she came and said, 'This is part of your past.'"

== Critical reception ==
Upon its release, Music Week stated, "While many may cringe at the sound of Tikaram's deep dark tones, there's still a fanbase out there and this slow, atmospheric track could go some way to winning new fans." Jeff Hall of the Courier-Post felt the song was "destined to be a breakout classic". He commented, "Perhaps the most exquisite pop song released so far this year, 'I Might Be Crying' combines a brooding drum/keyboard pulse and luxurious string arrangement with an ethereal vocal chant and Tikaram's own breathy delivery."

Holly Hernandez of Melody Maker wrote, "Now, Elvis Herselvis seems to have shuffled off her apocalyptic coil and gone all Paul Simon/Billy Joel on us, the spine of 'I Might Be Crying' being the chorus of Third World, basket-on-the-head, washer woman backing vocals." Andrew Balkin of the Kingston Informer gave a one star rating and remarked, "The woman with the humour bypass has excelled herself with an even more drab and dreary offering than usual. Needless to say, this will not win Miss Tikaram any new fans, and could even lose her some old ones."

In a review of Lovers in the City, Len Righi of The Morning Call praised the song as "an effective meditation on loss and regret", with Tikaram "pairing her crushed-but-not-quite-broken voice with a primitive hip-hop rhythm in a chat-like African spiritual". Darryl Cater of AllMusic noted the "inventive arrangement in which a full string and brass orchestra merely underscores a sweeping landscape of vocal harmonies".

== Track listing ==
=== Cassette single ===
1. "I Might Be Crying" - 3:54
2. "Five Feet Away" - 4:09

=== CD single ===
1. "I Might Be Crying" - 3:54
2. "Five Feet Away" - 4:09
3. "Not Waving but Drowning" - 3:52

=== CD single (US promo) ===
1. "I Might Be Crying" (Album Version) - 3:55

== Personnel ==
- Tanita Tikaram - lead vocals, backing vocals
- Jennifer Warnes - vocal chant
- The Valentini Strings - orchestra
- Thomas Newman - conductor, arrangement
- Chris "Snake" Davies - saxophone
- Noel Langley - trumpet
- Neil Sidwell - trombone
- Stevie Williams - bass, percussion, drum programming

=== Production ===
- Tanita Tikaram - producer
- Steve Price - engineering, mixing
- Tim Young - mastering

=== Other ===
- Farrington Associates - design
- Jean-Baptiste Mondino - photography

== Charts ==
Chart (1995)	Peak position
Australian Singles Chart	199
UK Singles (OCC)	64
Scotland Singles (OCC)	61
