= The Sweet Keeper =

Studio album by Tanita Tikaram
- Released: 29 January 1990
- Recorded: August 1988 – May 1989
- Studios: Red House Studios (Silcoe, England)
- Genres: Rock; pop; folk
- Length: 47:12
- Label: East West
- Producers: Peter Van Hooke; Rod Argent

Tanita Tikaram chronology
Ancient Heart (1988)	The Sweet Keeper (1990)	Everybody's Angel (1991)

Singles from The Sweet Keeper
- 1. "We Almost Got It Together" Released: 1990; 2. "Little Sister Leaving Town" Released: 1990; 3. "Thursday's Child" Released: 1990

The Sweet Keeper is the second studio album by British pop/folk singer-songwriter Tanita Tikaram, released in 1990. Like her debut album Ancient Heart (1988), it was produced by Peter Van Hooke and Rod Argent. Three tracks from the album were released as singles: "We Almost Got It Together", "Little Sister Leaving Town" and "Thursday's Child".

Although matching the #3 peak of Tikaram's debut album in her native UK and achieving Gold status, it sold in significantly lower numbers than Ancient Heart, which went Platinum.

== Critical reception ==
Professional ratings
Review scores
Source	Rating
AllMusic	2/5 stars
Calgary Herald	B
New Musical Express	7/10
Orlando Sentinel	3/5 stars
Record Mirror	3/5 stars
Smash Hits	4/10 stars

On its release, Bob Stanley of Melody Maker felt Tikaram's voice was the "centrepiece" of the album. He praised the use of strings and brass as "an inspired move", but felt they "intrude" on some of the songs. He considered Tikaram's lyrics to "barely compare" to those of her inspirations, Leonard Cohen and Joni Mitchell, stating that they "sound portentous, but are ultimately shadows to the words of Tanita's heroes and heroines". Stanley concluded, "The Sweet Keeper sees Tanita dabbling with the folk-pop of her debut, embellishing and improving it in some areas. They'll love it in Basingstoke and Norway - the next LP will be the real test."

In a retrospective write-up from AllMusic, Tom Demalon claimed the record is "much the same as the first go round. Musically, The Sweet Keeper is fairly unadventurous -- melodic, jazz-inflected adult pop with touches of folk. The only real moments that resonate are the tracks on which Sonny Landreth adds guitar. Lyrically, Tikaram is somewhat impenetrable, often going in circles that are so personal they leave the listener baffled. However, it's hard to resist that voice, husky and sounding more world-wise than her years. If it weren't for her voice, The Sweet Keeper would be easy to disregard. As things are, it's worth a listen, especially the Tikaram's hushed delivery on "It All Came Back Today."

== Track listing ==
All tracks composed by Tanita Tikaram.

1. "Once & Not Speak"
2. "Thursday's Child"
3. "It All Came Back Today"
4. "We Almost Got It Together"
5. "Consider the Rain"
6. "Sunset's Arrived"
7. "Little Sister Leaving Town"
8. "I Owe All to You"
9. "Love Story"
10. "Harm in Your Hands"

== Personnel ==
- Tanita Tikaram – guitar, vocals
- Mark Isham – trumpet
- Rod Argent – arranger, conductor, keyboards
- Sonny Landreth – bottleneck guitar
- Abigail Brown – violin
- Richie Buckley – tenor saxophone
- David Clifton – guitar
- Mark Cresswell – guitar
- Mitch Dalton – acoustic guitar
- Mark Davies – cello
- Roger Garland – violin
- John Giblin – bass
- Roy Gillard – violin
- John Heley – cello
- Helen Kamminga – viola
- Martin O'Connor – accordion
- Helen O'Hara – violin, arranger
- Mark Pharoah – violin
- Peter Van Hooke – arranger, drums
- Clem Clempson – acoustic guitar
- Rory McFarlane – bass
- Katherine Shave – violin
- Robert Woollard – cello
- Andrew Davis – double bass
- Anne Solomon – violin

== Charts ==
Chart performance for The Sweet Keeper
Chart (1990)	Peak position
Australian Albums (ARIA)	68
Austrian Albums (Ö3 Austria)	7
Canada Top Albums/CDs (RPM)	81
Dutch Albums (Album Top 100)	15
European Albums (Eurotipsheet)	3
Finnish Albums (The Official Finnish Charts)	2
German Albums (Offizielle Top 100)	3
Greek Albums (IFPI Greece)	1
Icelandic Albums (Tónlist)	5
Irish Albums (IFPI)	1
Italian Albums (Musica e dischi)	8
New Zealand Albums (RMNZ)	45
Norwegian Albums (VG-lista)	2
Swedish Albums (Sverigetopplistan)	4
Swiss Albums (Schweizer Hitparade)	7
UK Albums (Official Charts)	3
US Billboard 200	124
US Cash Box Top 200 Albums	95

== Certifications ==
Certifications for The Sweet Keeper
Region	Certification	Certified units/sales
Germany (BVMI)	Gold	250,000^{^}
Spain (Promusicae)	Gold	50,000^{^}
Switzerland (IFPI Switzerland)	Gold	25,000^{^}
United Kingdom (BPI)	Gold	100,000^{^}
^{^} Shipments figures based on certification alone.
