= Wonderful Shadow =

Single by Tanita Tikaram

from the album Lovers in the City
- Released: 20 March 1995
- Length: 6:10 (album version); 3:32 (single version)
- Label: East West Records
- Songwriter: Tanita Tikaram
- Producer: Tanita Tikaram

Tanita Tikaram singles chronology
| "I Might Be Crying" (1995) | "Wonderful Shadow" (1995) | "Yodelling Song" (1995) |

"Wonderful Shadow" is a song by British singer-songwriter Tanita Tikaram, which was released in 1995 as the second single from her fifth studio album Lovers in the City. The song was solely written and produced by Tikaram. "Wonderful Shadow" reached No. 198 on the UK Singles Chart in April 1995.

== Background ==
Speaking to the Evening Herald in 1995, Tikaram said of the song: "It's about somebody who sees love in everything. They're absolutely abandoned. I have a sneaking desire to be that person. I know more people who are like that and I'm attracted to them, because I'm amazed at people who follow their own desire."

== Critical reception ==
Upon its release, Music & Media wrote: "It might be hip to say Tanita is over, but it's not fair. Without being unfaithful to her roots she's steadily innovating her fragile music. The rhythm track underneath brings out the best in her." Music Week considered it a "brooding track" which is "accompanie[d] [by] a subtle dance beat" but added that it "somehow lacks the dynamism to make it a hit single".

In a review of Lovers in the City, Paul Robicheau of The Boston Globe noted the song was "set to a lazy dance beat". He also commented on the contrast between "I Might Be Crying" and "Wonderful Shadow", as they "explore both sides of romance". Out described the song as "sweet" and "well worth chasing Lovers in the City down [for]". Oliver P. Sweeney of Hot Press noted the song's "shuffly percussion". The Gavin Report considered the song to be the album's "centerpiece".

== Track listing ==
=== Europe and UK CD single ===
1. "Wonderful Shadow" – 6:10
2. "Have You Lost Your Way?" – 13:15
3. "Good Tradition" – 2:50

=== German CD single #2 ===
1. "Wonderful Shadow" – 6:10
2. "Wonderful Shadow" (Reconstruction Version) – 6:27
3. "Out on the Town" – 2:50

=== German promo CD single ===
1. "Wonderful Shadow" (Edit) – 3:32
2. "Wonderful Shadow" (Original Version) – 6:10
3. "Have You Lost Your Way?" – 13:15
4. "Good Tradition" – 2:50

== Personnel ==
=== "Wonderful Shadow" ===
- Tanita Tikaram – vocals
- Mark Creswell, Adam Kirk – guitar
- Stevie Williams – bass, percussion, drum programming
- The London Session Orchestra – strings
- Gavyn Wright – string arrangement, conductor

=== Production ===
- Tanita Tikaram – producer of "Wonderful Shadow", "Have You Lost Your Way?" and "Out on the Town"
- Peter Van Hooke, Rod Argent – producers of "Good Tradition"
- Steve Williams – producer of "Wonderful Shadow" (Reconstruction Version)
- Steve Price – engineer and mixing on "Wonderful Shadow"
- Tim Young – mastering on "Wonderful Shadow"

=== Other ===
- Farrington Associates – design
- Jean-Baptiste Mondino – photography

== Charts ==
| Chart (1995) | Peak position |
|---|---|
| UK Singles Chart | 198 |
