= Eleven Kinds of Loneliness (album) =

Studio album by Tanita Tikaram
- Released: 16 March 1992
- Recorded: August 1990 – May 1991
- Studio: Mayfair Studios (London, England); Roundhouse Studios (London, England); Sound Chambers (Los Angeles, CA); The Wool Hall (Bath, England)
- Genre: Rock/pop/folk
- Length: 43:28
- Label: East West 9031 76427 1
- Producer: Tanita Tikaram

Tanita Tikaram chronology
| Everybody's Angel (1991) | Eleven Kinds of Loneliness (1992) | Lovers in the City (1995) |

Singles from Eleven Kinds of Loneliness
- 1. "You Make the Whole World Cry" Released: 17 February 1992

Eleven Kinds of Loneliness is the fourth studio album by Tanita Tikaram, released in 1992. All songs were written and produced by the singer herself. "You Make the Whole World Cry" was the only single to be released from this album.

On this album, Tikaram ceased collaborating with Rod Argent and Peter Van Hooke and produced the album entirely by herself. The album did not chart in the UK.

In 1995, Tikaram recalled to The Record: "Eleven Kinds of Loneliness contained a lot of my passions about my music. It was a very intimate collection, but it didn't do very well."

== Critical reception ==
Professional ratings
Review scores
| Source | Rating |
|---|---|
| AllMusic | 2/5 stars |
| Calgary Herald | B− |
| NME | 6/10 |
| North County Times | 4/5 stars |

Upon its release, David Quantick of NME described Tikaram as the "glum-toned purveyor of hellacious folk-based mud bath depresso pop". He commented that the album is "free of the sub-Van Morrison wank that has marred her recent work" and noted that "harmonies abound and arrangements are spartan but full". He praised Tikaram as a "neat producer" who "can make a three-piece band sound chunky" and "knows a lot more about pop than one might expect". He admitted the album is "weird folk pop whose appeal I don't understand" but concluded, "You could be fond of this record if you were a fan of the acoustic meander, the obscure but personal lyric and the Tikaram voice." Jim Lawn of the Lennox Herald described the album as "probably her most consistent both musically and lyrically". The Calgary Herald commented, "Tikaram's lyrics can be muddled or melodies occasionally tedious, but there's a poignancy to her music that draws you in. Eleven Kinds of Loneliness is delivered like a diary in which she deals with the pain that comes with life and love."

In the US, Dan Bennett of the North County Times noted the album's "distinct and flavorable style", with Tikaram "exhibit[ing] a knack for gutsy themes amid roving musical impressions". Len Righi of The Morning Call described it as "uneven" but Tikaram's "most stylistically diverse record to date". The Santa Fe Reporter felt the album "wears thin during the second half", but added "there is ample evidence of Tikaram's natural affinity for effective arrangement and her vocals have become rough-hewn dynamic expressions that vary to suit the needs of the individual pieces".

Don Weller of the Honolulu Star-Bulletin considered it Tikaram's "least accessible work", "The problems are rooted in lean, flat arrangements which heighten rather than color her dark, often brooding voice, and which do nothing to put sparkle in her melodies." The Clarion-Ledger stated, "A puzzling disappointment. Tikaram's folkie singing is perfectly competent. Her wooden, half-hearted material, however, is unworthy of her talent."

== Track listing ==
All tracks composed by Tanita Tikaram.

1. "You Make the Whole World Cry"
2. "Elephant"
3. "Trouble"
4. "I Grant You"
5. "Heal You"
6. "To Drink the Rainbow"
7. "Out on the Town"
8. "Hot Stones"
9. "Men & Women"
10. "Any Reason"
11. "Love Don't Need No Tyranny"
12. "The Way That I Want You"

== Charts ==
| Chart (1992) | Peak position |
|---|---|
| Australian Albums (ARIA) | 147 |
| Austrian Albums (Ö3 Austria) | 33 |
| Dutch Albums (Album Top 100) | 60 |

== Personnel ==
- Tanita Tikaram – guitar, vocals
- David Hayes – bass, guitar, harmonica, background vocals
- Mark Isham – keyboards, arranger
- Rod Argent – keyboards
- Richie Buckley – saxophone
- Nic France – drums, percussion, keyboards, background vocals
- Bob Noble – keyboards
- Mark Creswell – guitar, background vocals
- Stefano Massel – photography
- Bill Smith Studio – sleeve design
