= Paul Charles =

Northern Irish writer, concert promoter and talent agent

Paul Charles (born 1949, Magherafelt) is a Northern Irish novelist, concert promoter, manager and talent agent.

Charles managed his first act, The Blues by Five, when he was 15 years old, and had to list the number of his local telephone call box on business cards. The telephone would be answered by whoever was passing, who would then walk to Charles' house and knock on the window to let him know there was a call for him.

In 1967 he moved from Northern Ireland to London, planning to study civil engineering, but soon began writing for Belfast-based magazine City Week, filing live reviews of Irish groups performing in London, and returned to the music business full-time. He then became manager, agent, lyricist and roadie for progressive rock band Fruupp.

When Fruupp disbanded Charles formed a promotion agency, Asgard, with associate Paul Fenn. The agency's first big signings were English punk bands Radio Stars and the Buzzcocks. Charles' clients now include Tom Waits, Ray Davies, Christy Moore, Don McLean, Waterboys, Nick Lowe, Lisa Ekdahl, Ronnie Spector, Marti Pellow, Ani DiFranco and Paul Carrack.

== Personal life ==
Charles lives in Primrose Hill, London, and County Donegal with his wife Catherine.

== Bibliography ==
=== Detective Inspector Christy Kennedy series ===
- I Love the Sound of Breaking Glass (1997)
- Last Boat to Camden Town (1997)
- Fountain of Sorrow (1998)
- The Ballad of Sean and Wilko (2000)
- The Hissing of the Silent Lonely Room (2001)
- I've Heard the Banshee Sing (2002)
- Justice Factory (2004)
- Sweetwater (2007)
- The Beautiful Sound of Silence (2008)
- A Pleasure To Do Death With You (2012)
- Departing Shadows (2019)

=== Inspector Starrett series ===
- The Dust of Death (2007)
- Family Life (2009)
- St Ernan's Blues (2016)

=== McCusker Mysteries ===
- Down on Cyprus Avenue (2014)
- A Day In The Life of Louis Bloom (2018)
- Hi Love, You Just Dropped Your Glove (2026)

=== Other fiction ===
- First of the True Believers (2002)
- The Last Dance (2012)
- The Prince of Heaven's Eyes (A Novella) (2012)
- The Lonesome Heart is Angry (2014)
- One of Our Jeans is Missing (2016)

=== Non-fiction ===
- How To Succeed in The Music Business (2002)
- Pocket Essentials: The Beatles (2003)
- The Complete Guide To Playing Live (2004)
- The Essential Beatles Book (2021)
- Adventures in Wonderland (2023)
