= Peter Paphides =

British journalist and broadcaster (born 1969)

- Born: Panayiotakis Paphides; July 1969 (age 57); Birmingham, England
- Occupations: Journalist, broadcaster
- Spouse: Caitlin Moran (m. 1999)
- Children: 2

Peter Paphides (born July 1969 as Panayiotakis Paphides or Panayiotis Paphides) is a British journalist and broadcaster.

== Early life ==
Paphides was born in Birmingham to a Greek Cypriot father, Chris, and a Greek mother, Victoria. He has an elder brother, Aki. His father ran the 'Great Western' fish bar in Acocks Green, and the family lived upstairs. In 1979, the family moved to the suburb of Olton, where his father ran the 'King Fisher' (now 'George's Fish Bar').

The name Panayiotakis was shortened to "Takis", before he decided he preferred to be called Peter. As a child, he had a lisp, and when he was three years old he developed selective mutism, wherein he would speak to no-one except his parents and brother.

He read philosophy at the University of Wales, Lampeter.

== Career ==
Between 2005 and 2010 he was employed as the chief rock critic of The Times and presented The Times' weekly music podcast for Sounds Music supplement. Since then, he has worked freelance including for The Guardian, Mojo and Q magazine. He has also made various documentaries for BBC Radio 4 and made a pilot for BBC 6 Music show Vinyl Revival which was later commissioned for a seven-part series, and was broadcast from 4 December 2011.

In 2019, Paphides launched Needle Mythology, a record label aimed at reissues of old albums that had not previously been available on vinyl. In October 2020, the label released its first album of new material, In Memory of My Feelings, an original collaboration between The Anchoress and Bernard Butler.

Paphides has also written for Melody Maker and Time Out.

In 2020 his memoir, Broken Greek, was published by Quercus. The book was reviewed positively by Alan Johnson in New Statesman, who wrote that he had "never read anything that tells the immigrant’s story with such clarity and tenderness". It won the 2021 RSL Christopher Bland Prize.

== Personal life ==
Paphides married writer and Times columnist Caitlin Moran on 27 December 1999; they met while both were working for Melody Maker. The couple share a home in Crouch End, North London (having previously lived in Holloway) and have two daughters. Both attended the BRIT School; the elder daughter Dora Paphides is a filmmaker, while the younger daughter is singer-songwriter Eaves Wilder.
