= LIAR (Love Isn't a Right) =

Studio album by Tanita Tikaram
- Released: October 10, 2025
- Studio: Gorbals Sound
- Genre: Pop rock
- Length: 44:30
- Labels: Cooking Vinyl; COOKLP930
- Producer: Andy Monaghan

Tanita Tikaram chronology
Closer to the People (2016)	LIAR (Love Isn't a Right) (2025)

Professional ratings
Review scores
Source	Rating
laut.de	4/5 stars
MusicOMH	4/5 stars
Rolling Stone (de)	3/5 stars

LIAR (Love Isn't a Right) is the tenth studio album by British singer-songwriter Tanita Tikaram, released on 10 October 2025 via Cooking Vinyl. This is her first album of new material in nearly a decade and has been described in promotional materials as a sequel to her 1988 debut release Ancient Heart.

== Background ==
Tikaram initially emerged in 1988 at age 18 with the album Ancient Heart, which included the hit single "Twist in My Sobriety". That album established her signature sound: a deep, husky vocal tone paired with literate, often ambiguous lyrics. She returned to high-profile live performance with an appearance at the Glastonbury Festival in 2024. The album was produced by Andy Monaghan. It features a chamber-band arrangement including violinist Helen O'Hara who also played on Ancient Heart. The album mixes eight original compositions with two covers.

In her interview with Monocle about the album, Tikaram explained "Ancient Heart’s songs reflect a teenager’s search for identity and belonging in a world that she often felt alienated from. The pieces featured on LIAR are from the perspective of someone who, having found her place in the world, now sees that world and its values and ideals crumbling around her."

== Reception ==
John Murphy of musicOMH stated: "It’s unlikely that LIAR will suddenly propel Tanita Tikaram back into the charts – it’s a very different world after all, and any newcomers to her material may find the lack of immediacy in these songs difficult to connect with. Instead, it’s an album to live with, and repeated plays bring new rewards. It serves as a fine reminder that Tanita Tikaram remains a fine songwriter, and one of our most expressive vocalists."

Luke Turner of The Quietus wrote that the album "combines classing songwriting with elegant strings and piano on songs digging deep into our contemporary political malaise... There are hints of jazz and classic pop, but something gothic too. Tikaram still has a voice that’s utterly distinctive and arguably ought to be more discussed as one of the most unique in British pop..."

== Track listing ==
All tracks are written by Tanita Tikaram except track 6 written by Molly Drake, track 8 written by Marc Pell and Tanita Tikaram, and track 9 written by Dimitri Tiomkin and Ned Washington.

No.	Title	Length
1.	"Turn the Lights Down Low"	4:37
2.	"Fais Moi La Solitude"	4:49
3.	"This Perfect Friend"	4:36
4.	"I See a Morning"	4:30
5.	"Fear and Chills"	3:23
6.	"Love Isn't a Right"	2:52
7.	"Lover Don't Come Around"	3:35
8.	"Sweet Feather & The Storm"	6:23
9.	"Wild Is the Wind"	5:17
10.	"Sailboats"	4:28
Total length:		44:30

== Personnel ==
- Tanita Tikaram – guitar (acoustic), keyboards, vocals
- Andy Monaghan – bass, drum machine, guitar, producing, vocals (background)
- Bartek Glowacki – accordion
- Chloe Bryce – vocals (background)
- Christopher Roberts – guitar (acoustic)
- Helen O'Hara – violin
- Lewis McLaughlin – vocals (background)
- Lucci Rossi – piano
- Marc Pell – drums
- Midori Jaeger – vocals (background)
- Zosia Jagodzinska – cello

== Charts ==
Chart (2025)	Peak position
Switzerland Albums Chart	71
Scottish Albums (Official Charts)	17
UK Albums (Official Charts)	92
UK Independent Albums (Official Charts)	3
