= Only the Ones We Love =

"Only The Ones We Love"

Single by Tanita Tikaram

from the album Everybody's Angel
- B-side: "Me in Mind"
- Released: 21 January 1991
- Genre: Folk rock
- Label: East West Records
- Songwriter: Tanita Tikaram
- Producers: Tanita Tikaram; Peter van Hooke; Rod Argent

Tanita Tikaram singles chronology
"Thursday's Child" (1990)	"Only The Ones We Love" (1991)	"I Love the Heaven's Solo" (1991)

"Only The Ones We Love" is a song by British singer-songwriter Tanita Tikaram, which was released in January 1991 by East West Records as the lead single from her third studio album, Everybody's Angel (1991). It was written by Tikaram, and produced by Tikaram, Peter van Hooke and Rod Argent.

== Background ==
Speaking of the song's message, Tikaram told Simon Mayo for the Reading Evening Post in 1991: "I made a deliberate effort last year to spend time with my family and the song is about that. I used to have this desire to be by myself all the time. You need to be reflected in the people you care for and who love you. I used to think there was this ideal place where you'd find you belonged. But as I get older I realise that place already exists in the people who care about you. And that's what the song is about."

The song features backing vocals by Jennifer Warnes. Tikaram revealed to The Morning Call in 1991: "She came to a gig in Los Angeles. She said, 'If you ever need anyone to sing on your albums, I'll do it.' This is like God talking. She's my idea of the perfect singer."

== Critical reception ==
Upon its release, Music & Media commented, "Call it precocious, call it what you want, it remains an amazing fact that such a young girl plays such mature music." Simon Lloyd of the Reading Evening Post described it as "a tad snappier" than Tikaram's previous releases, but added that it "retains the earthiness and soul that has become her trademark". Stuart Bailie of New Musical Express considered it to be a "startling return" for Tikaram, on which she "gets down to the guts of a plain, sad song". He added, "Getting so simple, so involved is a big achievement for this artist, helped with a swathe of violins, which give it some muted, Latino passion – not a terrific distance away from Al Martino's swoonsome 'Blue Spanish Eyes'."

Steve Stewart of Aberdeen Press and Journal gave the single three stars and wrote, "Tikaram seems to be trying to adopt the female Leonard Cohen tag. But despite the pleasant orchestration, the lyrical quality of her debut album Ancient Heart is missing." Leo Finlay of Sounds noted the song was "thoroughly innocuous" and "lavishly produced as ever", with Tikaram's voice having "a more mature feel". He concluded the song would "keep many a civil servant happy". Peter Stanton of Record Mirror called it "just another mournful ditty which should be played in a room with no dangerous objects". Paul Lester of Melody Maker was critical of the song, stating it meant "having to suffer this dreadful navel-scrutinising woman witter on about her private life again" and also questioning "how anyone can convey emotional torment with such a feeble-hearted lack of conviction".

In the US, Billboard praised Tikaram's "vulnerable delivery" and commented, "Tikaram's sensitive, world-weary voice takes center stage here and is backed by a hauntingly angelic chorus, which serves to heighten the song's somber mood." In a review of Everybody's Angel, Helen A.S. Popkin of the Tampa Bay Times wrote, "Tikaram sings about the matters of living, transcending the material world by illustrating her songs with the grace of emotion. "Only the Ones We Love" borders on the metaphysical, equating self-worth with those which we care for." In a retrospective review of the album, Tom Demalon of AllMusic described the song as "lovely" and Tikaram's vocals as "simply gorgeous".

== Track listing ==
=== 7" and cassette single ===
1. "Only the Ones We Love" - 2:47
2. "Me in Mind" - 3:23

=== 12" single ===
1. "Only the Ones We Love" - 2:47
2. "Me in Mind" - 3:23
3. "Mud in Any Water" - 3:44

=== CD single ===
1. "Only the Ones We Love" - 2:47
2. "Me in Mind" - 3:23
3. "Mud in Any Water" - 3:44
4. "Cathedral Song" (Instrumental) - 2:52

=== CD single (US promo) ===
1. "Only the Ones We Love" (Album Version) - 2:50

== Personnel ==
- Tanita Tikaram - vocals
- Jennifer Warnes - harmony vocals
- Rod Argent - piano
- Mark Creswell - guitar
- The String Orchestra - string section
- David Hayes - bass
- Nick France - drums

=== Production ===
- Tanita Tikaram - producer
- Peter van Hooke, Rod Argent - producers, mixing
- Simon Hurrell - engineer, mixing

=== Other ===
- Bill Smith Studio - design
- Deborah Feingold - photography

== Charts ==
Chart (1991)	Peak position
Europe Airplay (European Hit Radio)	41
Germany (German Singles Chart)	58
UK Singles (OCC)	69
UK Airplay (Music Week)	47
