= Closer to the People =

Studio album by Tanita Tikaram
- Released: 11 March 2016
- Studios: Soho Sound Kitchen, Tiki Toko Studios
- Genres: Indie pop, folk, rock
- Length: 35:22
- Label: Ear Music 0210912EMU
- Producers: Angie Pollock, Goetz Botzenhardt

Tanita Tikaram chronology
| Can't Go Back (2012) | Closer to the People (2016) | LIAR (Love Isn't a Right) (2025) |

Singles from Closer to the People
- 1. "Glass Love Train" Released: 22 January 2016; 2. "The Way You Move" Released: 22 April 2016

Closer to the People is the ninth studio album by the British singer Tanita Tikaram. The record was released on 11 March 2016 through Ear Music, an imprint of German-based label Edel Music. The album also produced two singles: "Glass Love Train" and "The Way You Move".

== Background ==
Closer to the People is Tikaram's first album in four years. Like her previous album Can't Go Back, it was released through Ear Music. Tikaram released a videoclip for the song "Food on My Table" in December 2015, although she stated this record was not the first single of the album. Tikaram said that the record is inspired by the blues compositions she likes to play with her band. Tikaram also explained to HuffPost UK that her latest music began taking form after she read a biography of American jazz singer Anita O'Day, who overcame her problems to perform jazz music for some 60 years.

== Reception ==
Professional ratings
Review scores
| Source | Rating |
|---|---|
| AllMusic | 3.5/5 stars |
| laut.de | 4/5 stars |
| The Music | 3.5/5 stars |
| Renowned for Sound | 3.5/5 stars |

Michael Smith of Renowned for Sound wrote "As such, Closer To The People isn’t an album for everybody. Jazz fans, or fans of Tanita Tikaram’s particular style of lyricism and husky vocals, will surely find it easier to get into than the new listener, but even on a cursory listen the album has its charm that makes it enjoyable. Had the scope of its songs been larger the appeal of the album may also have followed suit, but ultimately it remains in a rather subtle position".

Writing for Allmusic, critic Stephen Thomas Erlewine noted that "the record trades in jazz and soul influences while also spinning these familiar tropes into the realm of the personal. Tikaram specializes in sculpted, open-ended compositions - even when the tempo quickens her songs seem to unfold gracefully - and that means the hushed arrangements, underpinned by acoustic bass and brushed drums, seem like reflections of the song's soul. Such tasteful surroundings mean Closer to the People works well as a mood album - the quiet, sophisticated veneer is sustained from beginning to end - but the album is rewarding with closer attention, attention that reveals the details in both the arrangements and writing."

== Track listing ==
| No. | Title | Writer(s) | Length |
|---|---|---|---|
| 1. | "Glass Love Train" | Mark Cresswell / Tanita Tikaram | 4:36 |
| 2. | "Cool Waters" | Tanita Tikaram / Martin Winning | 4:05 |
| 3. | "The Way You Move" | Bryan Day / Tanita Tikaram | 2:53 |
| 4. | "Closer to the People" | Tanita Tikaram | 3:36 |
| 5. | "Gris Gris Tails" | Tanita Tikaram / Martin Winning | 3:09 |
| 6. | "The Dream of Her" | Tanita Tikaram / Martin Winning | 2:56 |
| 7. | "Don't Turn Your Back on Me" | Tanita Tikaram | 3:04 |
| 8. | "Food on my Table" | Tanita Tikaram | 4:37 |
| 9. | "Night Is a Bird" | Angie Pollock / Matt Radford / Tanita Tikaram / Martin Winning | 3:54 |
| 10. | "My Enemy" | Matt Radford / Tanita Tikaram | 2:32 |
| Total length: | | | 35:22 |

== Credits ==
- Arranged by – Angie Pollock (except tracks 6 & 10), Tanita Tikaram (except tracks 1 & 9), Mark Creswell (track 1)
- Design – Alexander Mertsch
- Mastered by – Tim Young
- Other (string day assistant to Goetz) – Jonny Firth
- Photography – Kurt Stallaert
- Producer – Angie Pollock
- Producer, recorded by, mixed by – Goetz Botzenhardt

== Chart performance ==
| Chart (2016) | Peak position |
|---|---|
| Ö3 Austria Top 40 | 68 |
| German Media Control Charts | 61 |
| Switzerland Albums Chart | 84 |
| UK Independent Albums (Official Charts) | 25 |
