= Lovers in the City =

Studio album by Tanita Tikaram
- Released: 13 February 1995
- Recorded: July 1993 – May 1994
- Studio: Groove Masters (Santa Monica), Angel Recording Studios, Mayfair Studios (London)
- Genre: Rock, pop, folk
- Length: 51:53
- Label: East West 4509-98804-2
- Producer: Thomas Newman, Tanita Tikaram

Tanita Tikaram chronology
Eleven Kinds of Loneliness (1992)	Lovers in the City (1995)	The Best of Tanita Tikaram (1996)

Singles from Lovers in the City
- 1. "I Might Be Crying" Released: 23 January 1995; 2. "Wonderful Shadow" Released: 20 March 1995; 3. "Yodelling Song" Released: 3 July 1995

Lovers in the City is the fifth studio album by Tanita Tikaram, released by East West Records in 1995. Jennifer Warnes provided backing vocals on four tracks on the album. One of these songs, "I Might Be Crying", was released as lead single. A video for this single was filmed in Vietnam. The album reached No. 75 in the UK charts. "I Might Be Crying" was the first single to be released from the album, and peaked at number 64 in the UK. "Wonderful Shadow" was the second single to be released and peaked at number 198 in the UK. "Yodelling Song" was the third and last single to be released and then only in some countries in continental Europe.

== Background ==
Lovers in the City saw Tikaram co-produce and work with film score composer Thomas Newman. She told Music Week in 1995, "Working with Thomas was really different because he's a film writer and he's really interested in sounds and structure, which is very different from me."

== Critical reception ==
Professional ratings
Review scores
Source	Rating
AllMusic	3/5 stars
NME	7/10

Upon its release, John Harris of NME praised Lovers in the City as "shockingly decent", with Tikaram "coming out of it looking like someone who's worthy of sharing lunch with Tori, Bjork or Kate Bush". He commented on how Tikaram had "binned most of the forced intellectualism that made her sound like an eternal undergraduate" and "turned her straining, fractured baritone into something of an asset". He also noted the involvement of Thomas Newman, who "takes most of [the album] into the realms of jarring strangeness". Music Week called it a "brooding, downbeat" album from the "husky songstress" which "lightens up with the introduction of some classical string arrangements". Sarra Manning of Melody Maker was critical, remarking that Tikaram's music was "plummeting to depths known only to champion potholers" with an album of "funereal dirges" where "the only mild exception is 'Yodelling Song', a determinedly uptempo exercise accompanied by the worst words in the world". She added that Tikaram's voice "veers from mawkish mumble to monotonal meandering" and "manages to convey her emotional extremes: depressed, very depressed, and even more depressed with PMT thrown in".

== Track listing ==
All tracks composed by Tanita Tikaram.

1. "I Might Be Crying"
2. "Bloodlines"
3. "Feeding the Witches"
4. "Happy Taxi"
5. "My Love Tonight"
6. "Lovers in the City"
7. "Yodelling Song"
8. "Wonderful Shadow"
9. "Women Who Cheat on the World"
10. "Leaving the Party"

== Personnel ==
- Tanita Tikaram – guitar, vocals
- David Lindley – guitar
- Jennifer Warnes – background vocals, chant
- John Beasley – piano
- Jim Keltner – drums
- Sid Page – violin
- Don Edwards – yodelling
- Larry Corbett – cello
- Stevie Williams – bass, percussion, drum programming
- Chris Davis – saxophone
- Michael Fisher – percussion, ocarina, sound effects, lujon, brass arrangement
- Paul Kegg – cello
- Michael Landau – electric guitar
- Noel Langley – trumpet
- Chris Laurence – bass
- Helen Liebmann – cello
- The London Session Orchestra – strings
- Martin Loveday – cello
- Thomas Newman – guitar, harmonica, piano, arranger, conductor, drum programming
- J. Neil Sidwell – trombone
- Philip Todd – saxophone soloist
- Gavyn Wright – arranger, conductor, viola, string & viola arrangements
- Mark Creswell – guitar
- Rick Cox – guitar, drum programming
- Tony Pleeth – cello
- Suzie Katayama – cello
- Jimmy Johnson- bass
- Jean-Baptiste Mondino - photography

== Charts ==
Chart performance for Lovers in the City
Chart (1995)	Peak position
Australian Albums (ARIA)	158
German Albums (Offizielle Top 100)	74
Swiss Albums (Schweizer Hitparade)	44
UK Albums (OCC)	75
