= Rory McFarlane =

British session musician

Rory McFarlane (sometimes billed as Ruari McFarlane) is a British musician and composer.

McFarlane wrote the score for English language OVA release of anime series Cyber City Oedo 808 (1990–1991). He composed a score for a game Buichi Terasawa's "Takeru: Letter of the Law" in 1996.

He was the bass player in Richard Thompson's live band in the 1980s and early 2000s, playing fretless and upright bass.

He played on the run of musical The Black Rider at London's Barbican Theatre in 2004.

McFarlane appeared on three of Nigel Kennedy's albums.

In the 2010s he worked with the British folk band Home Service, but had to retire in 2018 due to a neurological illness that meant he could no longer play.
