= Marco Sabiu =

Italian-born musician and composer (born 1963)

- Born: 1 September 1963 (age 62); Romagna, Italy
- Genres: Pop, classical, musical
- Occupations: Record producer, pianist, composer
- Instrument: Piano
- Years active: 1991–present
- Label: Sony Music International
- Website: www.marcosabiu.worldconcertartists.org

Marco Sabiu (born 1 September 1963) is an Italian-born musician and composer who has worked with Take That, Kylie Minogue, Barry Blue, Christopher Lee, and made music for television.

== Career ==
Born in the village of Forlì in Romagna, Sabiu began playing piano at the age of nine, and at the age of fourteen joined the Conservatory of Pesaro. In 1991, he moved to London and began a production collaboration with Charlie Rapino, working with pop acts such as Take That and Kylie Minogue. In 1998, Sabiu started working solo with artists such as Tanita Tikaram, Perry Blake, Françoise Hardy, Filippa Giordano, Luciano Pavarotti, Ennio Morricone, and others. In 2001, he returned to Italy where he built his own recording studio and worked on composing soundtracks.

Sabiu appeared in Italian television shows including Sanremo Festival and Domenica In. In 2010, he composed actor Christopher Lee's first concept album, Charlemagne: By the Sword and the Cross which will become a full-fledged musical in 2013. In 2008 and 2009, he conducted and orchestrated for the Notti in Arena shows by Italian rockstar Luciano Ligabue. In February 2011, Sabiu released his solo debut album, Sabiu No.7. In February 2012, Sabiu released a new solo album, entitled Audio Ergo Sum, featuring Yes singer Jon Anderson as a special guest. In May 2012, he founded the Marco Sabiu Orchestra.

In June 2015, he conducted the 1000 participants in the Rockin 1000 video of the Foo Fighters song "Learn to Fly".

== See also ==
- The Rapino Brothers
