= Tanita Tikaram =

British singer-songwriter (born 1969)

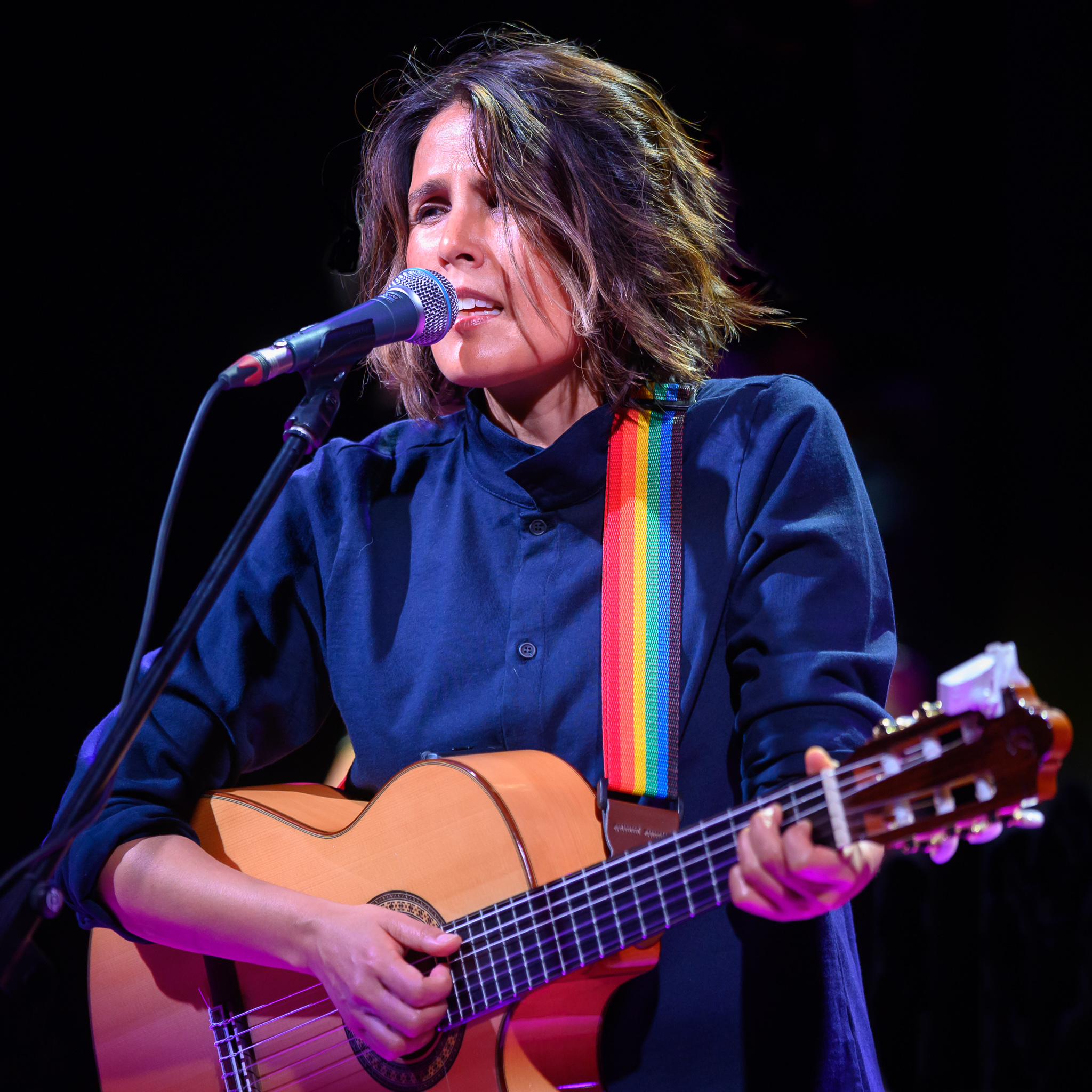
- Tikaram performing in 2019

Background information
- Born: 12 August 1969 (age 57); Münster, West Germany
- Genres: Pop; folk
- Occupation: Singer-songwriter
- Instruments: Vocals; guitar; piano
- Years active: 1988–present
- Labels: WEA; East West; Mother; Naïve; Ear; Cooking Vinyl
- Website: tanita-tikaram.com

Tanita Tikaram (born 12 August 1969) is a British singer-songwriter known for her low contralto voice and often cryptic lyrics. She achieved international success with her debut album, Ancient Heart (1988), which included the hit singles "Good Tradition" and "Twist in My Sobriety". Her music combines folk and pop with influences from soul, jazz and Americana.

Born in Münster, West Germany, Tikaram grew up in an army family before settling in Basingstoke, Hampshire. She began writing songs seriously as a teenager and was seen by the music agent and manager Paul Charles at an open mic night at London's Mean Fiddler; Charles became her manager. After signing with WEA in 1988, she recorded Ancient Heart, which was produced by Rod Argent and Peter Van Hooke. The album reached number three in the UK and topped charts in several European countries. At the 1989 Brit Awards, she was nominated for Best British Female Artist, while her "Twist in My Sobriety" was nominated for Best British Single.

Tikaram's subsequent work explored a broad range of arrangements and approaches to songwriting, including self-production on Eleven Kinds of Loneliness (1992) and co-writing with Marco Sabiu on The Cappuccino Songs (1998). Although her commercial success declined from its early peak, she continued recording at a more leisurely pace, with two seven-year intervals between albums. Piano became increasingly important to her writing, while later recordings emphasised collaboration with musicians and live ensemble performance. Her tenth studio album, LIAR (Love Isn't a Right) (2025), was conceived as a companion to her debut. In 2022, she participated in Sonia Boyce's Feeling Her Way, the British Pavilion installation that received the Golden Lion for Best National Participation at the 59th Venice Biennale.

Reviewers have praised Tikaram's distinctive contralto voice although some have criticised the obscurity of her lyrics and the restraint of her performances. Her early public image emphasised seriousness and melancholy, a characterisation she has said does not reflect her personality. Her concerts have ranged from solo acoustic passages to performances with larger ensembles, and she has expressed a preference for intimate venues and close connections with audiences.

== Life and career ==
=== Early life and musical beginnings ===
Tanita Tikaram was born on 12 August 1969 in Münster, West Germany, and is British. Her Indo-Fijian father, Pramod, served in the British Army, and her mother, Fatimah, was from Malaysia. Because of her father's military career, the family lived in Germany before settling in Basingstoke, Hampshire, when Tikaram was 12. Her older brother is actor Ramon Tikaram. She attended Brighton Hill School and Queen Mary's College in Basingstoke.

Music formed part of Tikaram's childhood through gatherings of the Fijian community attended by her family. She began playing guitar at around the age of ten and attended a guitar club at school; she and her brother also sang and recorded songs together. At home she listened to the Beatles, soul and country music. After moving to England she stopped playing guitar for several years, returning to it in her teens after hearing Joni Mitchell's Ladies of the Canyon. Tikaram later recalled writing songs as a child but said that she began taking songwriting seriously as a teenager. Her early influences included Mitchell, Leonard Cohen, Van Morrison and the author Virginia Woolf. While studying for A-levels in English, politics and sociology, Tikaram wrote "Poor Cow", which she described as being about "an awkward young woman who didn't fit in with everybody".

After finishing college, she unsuccessfully applied to study at St Anne's College, Oxford. She was accepted to study British and American literature at the University of Manchester but decided to defer her admission for a year, working in short-term roles including as a tea lady, kitchen assistant and selling advertisements. She recorded a three-track demo tape and sent it to the Mean Fiddler in London, where she was invited to perform at an open-mic night in December 1987. This was to be her second public performance, the first having been supporting Papa Brittle at a community centre in Basingstoke. She recalled the Basingstoke show in 1989: "I was sandwiched between a gothic band and a funk band. I came on with my guitar and it was probably the most embarrassing moment in my life." She added that following this experience she did not want to play in Basingstoke again, so sought opportunities in London.

The agent Paul Charles, who had been working with the singer-songwriter Paul Brady, saw the performance in the Mean Fiddler acoustic room while waiting for Brady to come on stage in the main room. Charles, who had previously been the agent for acts including Morrison and Elvis Costello, was impressed by Tikaram's stagecraft and handling of chattering audience members and invited her to meet at his office.Tikaram played many songs for him, all of which he liked, and he subsequently became her manager. She played as support for artists linked to Charles like Brady, Jonathan Richman, John Martyn, and Warren Zevon as well as playing her own shows in smaller venues. Tikaram signed with WEA in March 1988. She also set up her own music publishing company, Brogue Music, and wrote to the University of Manchester to say that she would not be taking up her place.

=== 1988–1989: Ancient Heart ===
Tikaram in 1988

Tikaram's debut single, "Good Tradition", entered the UK chart in July 1988 and reached number 10 on the UK Singles Chart in August. Her debut album, Ancient Heart, followed in September. It was produced by Rod Argent and Peter Van Hooke and featured musicians including Helen O'Hara, David Lindley and Mark Isham. Tikaram's voice and guitar were recorded early in the process, with the producers and other musicians developing the arrangements around her performances. The album reached number one in several countries. It first topped the charts in Norway in November 1988, where it stayed at the top for 14 weeks. It also reached number one in Austria, Germany, Greece and Switzerland. In the UK, it peaked at number three, and went platinum by February 1989. The album also included "Twist in My Sobriety", which was released as a single and became a hit in several European countries.

A UK tour supporting Ancient Heart in the second half of 1988 was followed by a tour across Europe, the USA and Canada in 1989. Reviewers frequently focused on the contrast between her youth and her low voice and sombre songs.

Tikaram was nominated for Best British Female Artist at the Brit Awards 1989, while "Twist in My Sobriety" was nominated for Best British Single. At the end of 1989, Music & Media magazine reviewed the best-selling singles and albums throughout Europe in 1989, and identified Tikaram as the third-most successful female artist of the year. In the printed programme for the Brit Awards, Tikaram described her songs as "one part elaborate code and one part 'feet-off-the-ground' logic." Ancient Heart went double platinum in the UK by July 1989. Charles recalled that in negotiations with WEA, he had requested a royalty escalation clause for reaching three million album sales; the company representatives, believing this unrealistic, agreed. He also recollected that within two years, Ancient Heart had sold over three-and-a-half million copies, earning Tikaram a high royalty rate; he commented that "she earned each and every penny of it. I know just how hard she worked for her success."

=== 1990–1992: The Sweet Keeper, Everybody's Angel and Eleven Kinds of Loneliness ===
Tikaram wrote much of her second album The Sweet Keeper (1990) while touring in support of Ancient Heart. It was again produced by Argent and Van Hooke. Robin Denselow of The Guardian praised Tikaram for not attempting to repeat the formula of Ancient Heart and considered the second album more confident than the first, while David Sinclair of The Times praised the quality of her voice but found the record overly restrained.

Everybody's Angel (1991) was co-produced by Tikaram, Argent and Van Hooke; Jennifer Warnes sang harmony on "Only the Ones We Love". Reviews again focused on Tikaram's voice, arrangements and often opaque lyrics. Sinclair praised her singing but found the words difficult to understand, while Adam Sweeting of The Guardian thought the album showed artistic growth despite several weaker tracks which he felt could have been omitted.

Tikaram produced her fourth album, Eleven Kinds of Loneliness (1992), herself. It was named after the book by Richard Yates. She later described the album as a deliberate artistic change, combining rawer performances, different vocal registers and songs informed by her feelings about being a woman. A Washington Post review by Geoffrey Himes characterised its arrangements as sparse and atmospheric. In a 1995 interview with Nick Hornby, she said that the record company had not liked her production and that the experience had reduced her confidence in producing her own work. In 2019 she commented that she found it difficult to produce her own records because "you don't have any distance. I can say I like this particular sound, but I don't know how to achieve it technically."

=== 1993–2005: Lovers in the City, The Cappuccino Songs and Sentimental ===
After a period of travelling and reduced promotional activity, Tikaram returned with Lovers in the City in 1995. Tikaram and film composer Thomas Newman each produced five of the ten tracks. She said that working with Newman was "really different because he's a film writer and he's really interested in sounds and structure, which is very different from me." The author Lucy O'Brien considered the album to be "a more mature and connected expression of [Tikaram's] identity." Reviewing the album for The Independent, Angela Lewis placed Tikaram in a singer-songwriter tradition alongside Nanci Griffith, Joan Armatrading and Mary Margaret O'Hara, while finding the recording's polished production less successful than its strongest songs. Sarra Manning of Melody Maker wrote that the album consisted mainly of "funereal dirges" and that Tikaram's voice "veers from mawkish mumble to monotonal meandering".

Tikaram left WEA after the compilation The Best of Tanita Tikaram (1996). Peter Kane of Q and Gill Whyte of Vox each felt that there was little of interest on the compilation apart from "Good Tradition" and "Twist in My Sobriety". In 1998, the author Nigel Harrison noted that Tikaram had experienced "ever diminishing chart success since the late 1980s."

For The Cappuccino Songs (1998), Tikaram worked with the Italian musician Marco Sabiu and used co-writing more extensively than on her previous albums. She said that Sabiu encouraged her to write on piano, sing in a higher register and make greater use of vocal harmonies. Peter Aspden of the Financial Times interpreted the album's lighter pop, Latin and lounge-influenced arrangements as a stylistic reinvention, but suggested that there was a mismatch between brighter material and her low voice. David Cheal of The Daily Telegraph praised the album as "sultry and evocative songs about love and yearning from the woman with the golden larynx".

Tikaram did not release another studio album for seven years. While developing Sentimental (2005), she abandoned experiments with computer-based arrangements in favour of piano and live musicians. In 2019 she commented that "I never had a great passion for the guitar. It just happened to be the cheapest instrument when I was growing up. When I discovered the piano, it opened up my sound world." The completed album included arrangements by Daniela Ronconi and guest vocals by Nick Lowe. Sullivan interpreted the record as reflecting Tikaram's acceptance of her dark vocal register and preference for warm, natural instrumentation, while Nick Coleman of The Independent praised its intimate, restrained approach. Sentimental reached number 42 on the UK Independent Albums Chart.

=== 2005–present ===
Tikaram in 2025

Following Sentimental, Tikaram worked at a slower pace, which she later contrasted with the intensive schedule of her early career. In 2011, she announced the Acoustic Sessions Tour, including performances in Amsterdam, Milan and London. She was asked about the seven-year gap since Sentimental in a 2012 interview and replied that "I am still learning things and so it has been like a very over extended gap year." Reflecting on the long intervals between her albums in 2017, Tikaram said that she had felt little pressure to record and associated the gaps with growing up and taking time over her life and work.

After several attempts to find a producer for a new album, a friend of Tikaram's recommended Paul Bryan, known for his work with Aimee Mann. Bryan produced Can't Go Back (2012), which was recorded in Los Angeles with a mainly American group of musicians. Tikaram said that the album was recorded in slightly more than six days and that she sought the dynamism of musicians playing together rather than extensively layered production. She mentioned Americana and funk among the record's influences. Ben Hogwood of musicOMH praised the work of producer Paul Bryan, which he felt "[elevates] the album from a fine collection of songs to a body of intimate and emotive work". Can't Go Back reached number 21 on the UK Independent Albums Chart and number 50 in Germany. In December 2012, it received a European Silver sales award from the Independent Music Companies Association (IMPALA).

Closer to the People followed in 2016. Tikaram worked with members of her touring band and explored arrangements influenced by jazz and soul. In Uncut, Nigel Williamson felt that the album was "Dignified, discriminating and richly rewarding." The album reached number 25 on the UK Independent Albums Chart and number 61 in Germany. The anthology To Drink the Rainbow was released by Needle Mythology in 2019. Needle Mythology founder Pete Paphides said that the tracklist had started as his own Spotify playlist; he asked Tikaram if he could release it as an album and she agreed.

In 2022, Tikaram participated in Sonia Boyce's installation Feeling Her Way, made for the British Pavilion at the 59th Venice Biennale. The work brought Tikaram together with vocalists Poppy Ajudha, Jacqui Dankworth, Sofia Jernberg and Errollyn Wallen in improvised performances filmed in recording studios. The installation received the Golden Lion for Best National Participation. Maya Jaggi described Tikaram improvising her initial five pieces as "an astonishing surge of creativity unleashed." The installation was recreated at Turner Contemporary and then Leeds Art Gallery in 2023.

Tikaram signed to Cooking Vinyl in 2024. Her tenth studio album, LIAR (Love Isn't a Right), was released in 2025. It was conceived as a companion to Ancient Heart and reunited her with O'Hara. Tikaram said that while tracks on Ancient Heart "reflect a teenager's search for identity and belonging in a world that she often felt alienated from", the songs on LIAR "are from the perspective of someone who, having found her place in the world, now sees that world and its values and ideals crumbling around her." Timothy Monger of AllMusic commented that the material covered ageing, identity and social questions, with "elegant chamber pop arrangements". The musicOMH reviewer, John Murphy, gave it a four-star rating. The album reached number 92 on the UK Albums Chart and number three on the UK Independent Albums Chart.

== Artistry ==
=== Music and voice ===
Tikaram is a contralto whose low register has frequently been commented on. Early reviewers compared her delivery to folk singing, jazz vocal performance and the work of Armatrading and Marlene Dietrich. She has commented that a low register is harder to project because it lies close to speaking range; pushing the voice too strongly can, in her view, reduce its emotional effect. She therefore favoured a restrained or "still" delivery. Tikaram described her singing and performing as more direct forms of communication than conversation.

Her early recordings combined folk and singer-songwriter based material with pop production and instrumentation including strings, oboe and fretless bass. Soul, jazz and Celtic-influenced arrangements became more prominent across her early albums. The Cappuccino Songs adopted brighter and more rhythmically varied pop arrangements, and Sentimental emphasised piano, jazz influences and live ensemble performance. Discussing Closer to the People, she mentioned a broad range of influences and said that she had been listening more to jazz.

=== Songwriting and influences ===
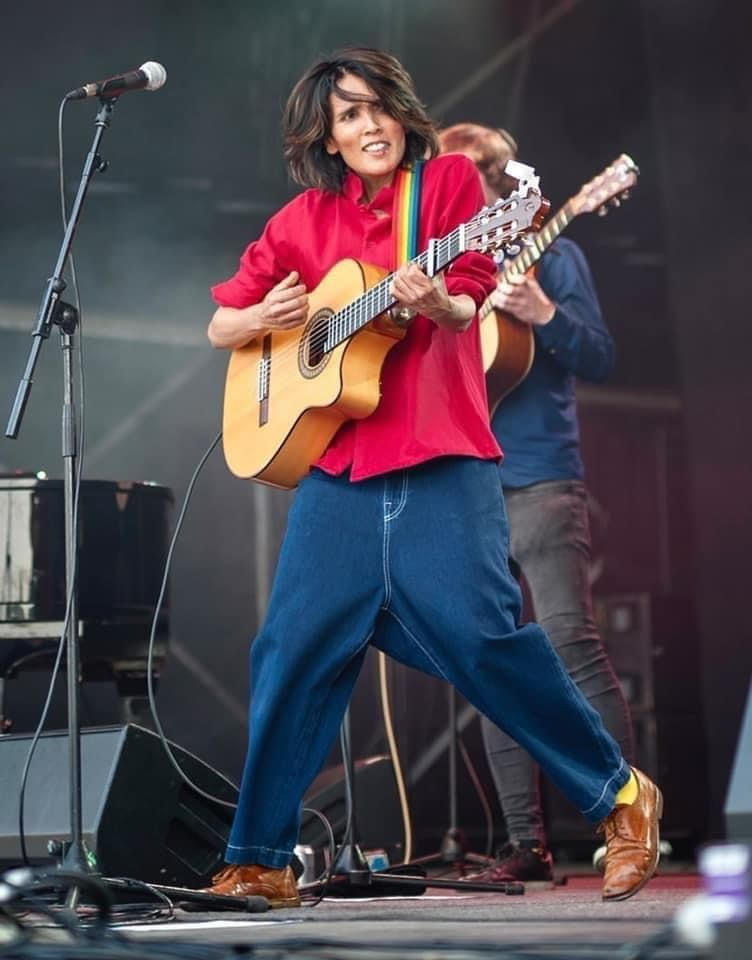
Tikaram performing in 2022

Tikaram has listed Mitchell, Cohen, Van Morrison, Tom Waits, the Roches and Rickie Lee Jones as among those she listened to while developing as a songwriter. She has also discussed the influence of Nina Simone, Carole King and Paul Simon on her work. Her childhood listening included the West Side Story soundtrack, the Beatles, country and soul singers and the music sung at Indo-Fijian family gatherings.

Her early lyrics were sometimes criticised as immature, as "sixth form" level. Tikaram responded in a 1991 interview that it was an "obvious" criticism to be made, pointing out that "I was only a sixth-former when I wrote them." Some critics have remarked that the lyrics are overly opaque. In a 1990 review of The Sweet Keeper, Bob Stanley of Melody Maker wrote that the lyrics "sound simple but are often impenetrable." Tikaram commented in 1988 that "Songs don't mean anything, do they? I mean, a song is meant to sum up a moment. Once I say 'this means that' it takes away a lot of pleasure for the listener." She has also described songs as acquiring multiple meanings as listeners relate them to their own lives.

In 1995, Tikaram told the music journalist Karen O'Brien that she generally wrote during concentrated periods of inspiration rather than according to a fixed routine. She said that her individual work commonly began with a voice, phrase or recurring idea; working with collaborators to a schedule produced "very generalised songs." Her methods developed over time: she initially wrote primarily on guitar, while her collaboration with Sabiu for The Cappuccino Songs encompassed piano composition, harmony singing and use of a higher vocal register. From Sentimental onwards, the use of piano and interaction with other musicians became more central to her recording process. In a 2016 interview with Songwriting Magazine, Tikaram said that she now wrote more on piano, rather than on guitar as she had previously, and that while she collaborated on music, the lyrics all originated from her.

=== Live performances ===
Tikaram's first headline tours were in 1988 and 1989 in support of Ancient Heart. Reviewing her 1989 concerts, Steve Morse of The Boston Globe praised her poise and stylistic range, while Jon Pareles of The New York Times found her and her band too restrained. Pareles and Chris Willman of the Los Angeles Times considered her particularly effective in solo acoustic passages. Kathi Whalen of The Washington Post praised the expressiveness of Tikaram's voice at the 9:30 Club, describing her absorbed delivery with her eyes closed. Reviewing her at London's National Ballroom, Bob Stanley praised the interaction between her voice and O'Hara's violin, although he found Tikaram's singing uneven and the sound mix poor.

Paul Lester criticised Tikaram's emotional restraint at Sheffield City Hall in 1990, while acknowledging the effectiveness of the violin and strings. Jasper Rees found her 1990 Hammersmith Odeon concert monotonous until a string orchestra joined her for the encore, while Mike Joyce considered the songs at her 1991 Barns at Wolf Trap show insufficiently varied but admired Tikaram's voice. Reviewing her return to Hammersmith in 1991, David Sinclair praised the band and her singing, particularly on slower songs, but considered her stage presence awkward. In contrast, Greg Kot found greater emotional directness in her 1991 Park West concert in Chicago than in her recordings and praised the accompaniment, particularly bassist David Hayes. Willman praised the band at the Roxy later that month but felt that the Morrison-influenced soul arrangements and an encore of "Domino" were unsuited to Tikaram's voice.

At York Barbican in 1995, Tikaram alternated solo acoustic passages with accompaniment from a five-piece band, whose instrumentation included mandolin, accordion and electric guitars. In Lighting + Sound International, Steve Moles praised her vocal timbre and the production team's work but found the predominantly sombre repertoire insufficiently varied.

In 2012, Tikaram said that she was performing more frequently after a period of limited live activity, working with both a trio and a larger band. She expressed a preference for smaller venues, where she felt closer to listeners than at festivals. At the Barbican in February 2017, she combined older material with songs from Closer to the People. Matthew Wright of The Arts Desk described her stage persona as bashful and suggested that singing allowed her to express feelings she otherwise found difficult to communicate. A similar setlist was used for her tour later that year.

At the Royal Festival Hall in November 2025, Tikaram performed material from LIAR (Love Isn't a Right) alongside earlier songs, with an ensemble including strings, accordion and members of the London Gospel Choir. Eleanor Thorn of Southwark News highlighted the revised arrangements, including a faster version of "Twist in My Sobriety" in which violin and accordion replaced the original oboe part.

== Public image and critical reception ==
Tikaram remarked that her age and deep voice attracted comment during her early success. Her manager, Charles, said that when Tikaram was starting out, he made sure that her earliest photoshoots included her Washburn guitar, to reinforce that she was a serious musician and songwriter. Richard Harrington, in a piece syndicated from The Washington Post, wrote in 1989 that the success of Suzanne Vega and Tracy Chapman had created a favourable climate for artists such as Tikaram, while also encouraging comparisons among them. Tikaram challenged that framing in a June 1988 Music Week profile: she rejected the idea of a sudden rise in female singers, arguing that women were simply becoming more noticeable and hoped WEA's interest was solely because of her musical skill.

Lucy O'Brien considered that, like a number of women musicians promoted in the late 1980s, Tikaram was marketed through an emphasis on individuality and eccentricity. In 2005, Caroline Sullivan argued that Tikaram had occupied an awkward position in the press: she was presented as too intense for conventional pop while being considered too young to receive the seriousness accorded to older singer-songwriters. Tikaram has said that the gloomy image did not reflect her personality and was partly constructed from her voice, appearance and clothing.

Reviews of her early albums praised the distinctive quality of her voice and arrangements but were divided over the obscurity of her lyrics. Aspden saw The Cappuccino Songs as a stylistic reinvention, while Sentimental was regarded as a more intimate combination of Tikaram's material and voice.

During her time with WEA, each of her albums sold less than the previous one. Sean Egan wrote in 2019 that after The Cappuccino Songs, which was issued on Mother Records, it seemed that Tikaram was "rather scrabbling around for outlets, inking deals with a new, unfamiliar, continental-based outfit each time out."

== Personal life ==
Tikaram moved to London following the success of Ancient Heart and has lived in the Primrose Hill area; she has also lived in Los Angeles, Perugia, Ravenna and Paris. Tikaram's first interview in which she spoke about her sexuality was with Jane Czyzselska of Diva in 2017. Czyzselska reported that Tikaram had been in a relationship for five years with multimedia artist Natacha Horn, and that they lived together; Tikaram declined to say how they had met, describing the story as private. Horn said in 2025 that she and Tikaram had been living together for 13 years. The music journalist Sean Egan asked Tikaram in 2019 whether she had previously felt obliged to conceal her sexuality. She replied that she had not, describing herself as a private person who felt it could be "quite nice not to know a lot about an artist."

== Discography ==
Tanita Tikaram albums
Year	Title	Label	Ref.
1988	Ancient Heart	WEA	
1990	The Sweet Keeper	East West	
1991	Everybody's Angel	East West	
1992	Eleven Kinds of Loneliness	East West	
1995	Lovers in the City	East West	
1996	The Best of Tanita Tikaram	East West	
1998	The Cappuccino Songs	Mother	
2005	Sentimental	Naïve, V2	
2012	Can't Go Back	Ear Music	
2016	Closer to the People	Ear Music	
2019	To Drink the Rainbow (An Anthology 1988–2019)	Needle Mythology	
2025	LIAR (Love Isn't a Right)	Cooking Vinyl	

== Tours ==
Concert tours and touring periods
Years	Associated release	Territories and details	Ref.
1988	Ancient Heart	35 shows: 34 in the UK, and one date in Dublin, Ireland	
1989	Ancient Heart	59 shows, UK, Netherlands, Belgium, Norway, Finland, Sweden, Denmark, Germany, Austria, Italy, France, Canada, USA. Some festivals including Pinkpop Festival and Montreux Jazz Festival	
1990	The Sweet Keeper	64 shows: UK, Ireland, Netherlands, Denmark, Sweden, Finland, Norway, Germany, France, Greece, Turkey, Israel, Yugoslavia, Czechoslovakia	
1991	Everybody's Angel	56 shows: Ireland, UK, Austria, USA, Canada, Germany, Luxembourg, Netherlands, France, Spain, Portugal, Switzerland	
1994–95	Lovers in the City	28 shows: UK, Netherlands, Germany, Switzerland, Austria, Italy, Belgium, Russia, Estonia, Greece. Last show was the Glastonbury Festival 1995.	
1998	The Cappuccino Songs	6 shows: UK, Italy, Poland	
2011	–	The Acoustic Sessions Tour. 4 shows: Netherlands, Italy, UK, Switzerland	
2012	–	12 shows: UK, Netherlands, Germany, Switzerland, Austria	
2014	–	European Tour. 7 shows: Switzerland, Germany	
2016	Closer to the People	25 shows: Germany, Switzerland, Austria, France, Italy, Netherlands, Belgium, UK, Norway	
2017	–	London show in February; 14 shows in October: Belgium, Netherlands, Germany	
2019	To Drink the Rainbow	The Woman in the Band Tour. 17 shows: Germany, Switzerland, Austria	
2025	LIAR (Love Isn't a Right)	16 shows: Germany, Slovenia, Switzerland, Italy, Austria, Czechia, Poland, Netherlands, Ireland, UK	

== Awards and nominations ==
Awards and nominations received by Tanita Tikaram or for works closely associated with her
Year	Award	Nominated	Category	Result	Ref.
1988	Diamond Awards	Herself	Diamond Spotlight Award	Won (Note: For newcomers; Melissa Etheridge also received a Diamond Spotlight Award.)	
1989	MTV Video Music Awards	"Twist in My Sobriety"	Best Female Video	Nominated	
1989	MTV Video Music Awards	"Twist in My Sobriety"	Best Cinematography	Nominated	
1989	Brit Awards	"Twist in My Sobriety"	Best British Single	Nominated	
1989	Brit Awards	Herself	Best British Female Artist	Nominated	
1989	Music & Media Year-End Awards	Herself	Female Artist of the Year (Note: Based on statistics from the Eurochart Hot 100 Singles and the European Top 100 Albums)	3rd place	
1990	D&AD Awards	"Cathedral Song"	Most Outstanding Pop Promo	Yellow Pencil (Note: The Design and Art Direction Awards website says that the Yellow Pencil is "For outstanding work that achieves true creative excellence.")	
1995	D&AD Awards	"I Might Be Crying"	Photography	Yellow Pencil	
1995	D&AD Awards	"I Might Be Crying"	Individual Video	Graphite Pencil (Note: The Design and Art Direction Awards website says that the Graphite Pencil is "For stand-out work that rises above the rest, worthy of consideration for a Yellow Pencil.")	
