= The Best of Tanita Tikaram =

Compilation album by Tanita Tikaram
- Released: 2 September 1996
- Genre: Rock/pop/folk
- Label: East West Records
- Producer: Tanita Tikaram, Peter van Hooke, Rod Argent, Thomas Newman, Rapino brothers

Tanita Tikaram chronology
Lovers in the City (1995)	The Best of Tanita Tikaram (1996)	The Cappuccino Songs (1998)

Singles from The Best of Tanita Tikaram
- 1. "Twist in My Sobriety (remix)" Released: 1996; 2. "And I Think of You - E penso a te" Released: 1996 (promo only)

Professional ratings
Review scores
Source	Rating
Allmusic	4/5 stars

The Best of Tanita Tikaram is the first compilation by pop singer Tanita Tikaram, released in 1996 by East West Records. Containing fifteen songs from 1988 to 1995, it also included one new track "And I Think of You - E penso a te" which was released as a promotional single and a special remix of her biggest hit "Twist in My Sobriety" which was also released as a single in UK.

== Track listing ==
1. "Twist in My Sobriety" (1988)
2. "Cathedral Song" (1988)
3. "World Outside Your Window" (1988)
4. "Good Tradition" (1988)
5. "Love Don't Need No Tyranny" (1992)
6. "Little Sister Leaving Town" (1990)
7. "Only the Ones We Love" (1991)
8. "You Make the Whole World Cry" (1992)
9. "Trouble" (1992)
10. "Wonderful Shadow" (1995)
11. "Men & Women" (1992)
12. "I Might Be Crying" (1994)
13. "Happy Taxi" (1994)
14. "My Love Tonight" (1994)
15. "Lovers in the City" (1994)
16. "And I Think of You - E penso a te" (1996)
17. "Twist in My Sobriety" (Tikaramp radio) (1996)

== Personnel ==
- Engineer – Simon Hurrell (tracks: 1 2 3 4 5 6 7 8 9 17)
- Engineer – John Hudson (tracks: 14), Steve Krause (tracks: 11), Steve Price (tracks: 10 12 13 15)
- Liner notes – Alan Jackson
- Mixed by – Mark (tracks: 5 8 9), Nic (tracks: 5 8 9), Peter (tracks: 1 2 3 4 6 7), Rod (tracks: 1 2 3 4 6 7), Simon* (tracks: 1 2 3 4 5 6 7 8 9)
- Producer – Peter Van Hooke (tracks: 1 2 3 4 6 7 17), The Rapino Brothers (tracks: 16), Rod Argent (tracks: 1 2 3 4 6 7 17), Tanita Tikaram (tracks: 5 7 8 9 10 11 12 14), Thomas Newman (tracks: 13 15)
- Written by – Battisti (tracks: 16), Mogol (tracks: 16), Tanita Tikaram (tracks: 1 2 3 4 5 6 7 8 9 10 11 12 13 14 15 17)

== Notes ==
- Short biography written by Alan Jackson, The Times, May 1996.
- (P) Tracks 1–4 1988, track 6 1990, track 7 1991 WEA Records Ltd., tracks 5,8,9,11 1992, track 10 1995, tracks 12–15 1994 WMUK Ltd., tracks 16,17 1996 Warner Music UK Ltd.
- Made in Germany by Warner Music Europe.
- Tracks 1–16 are album versions, tracks 16 & 17 previously unreleased.
- Durations do not appear on the release.
