= Ancient Heart =

Studio album by Tanita Tikaram
- Released: 12 September 1988
- Recorded: April–July 1988
- Studios: Red House Studio, Silsoe, Bedfordshire, England
- Genres: Pop; folk
- Length: 43:20
- Labels: WEA; Reprise
- Producers: Rod Argent; Peter Van Hooke

Tanita Tikaram chronology
Ancient Heart (1988)	The Sweet Keeper (1990)

Singles from Ancient Heart
- 1. "Good Tradition" Released: 27 June 1988; 2. "Twist in My Sobriety" Released: 10 October 1988; 3. "Cathedral Song" Released: 2 January 1989; 4. "World Outside Your Window" Released: 27 February 1989

Ancient Heart is the debut studio album by British singer-songwriter Tanita Tikaram, released by WEA on 12 September 1988. Produced by Rod Argent and Peter Van Hooke, it combines folk and pop. Four singles were released from the album: "Good Tradition", "Twist in My Sobriety", "Cathedral Song" and "World Outside Your Window".

Tikaram wrote the songs as a teenager before signing with WEA in 1988. Recorded at Red House Studio in Silsoe, England, the album's arrangements were developed around her vocal and guitar performances. Tikaram's low voice and the songs' often cryptic lyrics are accompanied by instrumentation including violin, oboe and horns. Its release was supported by music videos and tours of Britain, continental Europe and North America.

Reviews praised Tikaram's distinctive voice and the arrangements, but some critics found the songwriting uneven and the lyrics obscure. Retrospective assessments have continued to recognise her vocal style and the album's production. Tikaram was nominated for Best British Female Artist at the Brit Awards 1989, and "Twist in My Sobriety" was nominated for Best British Single. The album achieved international commercial success, reaching number three on the UK Albums Chart and topping charts in several European countries. It was certified double platinum in the UK; a 2005 profile put sales at around four million.

== Background ==
Tanita Tikaram played guitar as a child and became more seriously interested in songwriting in her later teens after encountering the work of artists including Joni Mitchell, Van Morrison, Leonard Cohen, Tom Waits, The Roches and Rickie Lee Jones. She later recalled that she had previously written long pieces of prose but not set them to music. "Poor Cow" was the first song for which she set her prose to music; she said that the early group of songs that were written after it became material for Ancient Heart.

After a first public performance in Basingstoke that she recalled as embarrassing, Tikaram sought opportunities to perform in London and sent a three-song demo to the Mean Fiddler. She performed in the venue's Acoustic Room in December 1987, where she was seen by music agent Paul Charles, who subsequently became her manager. In his memoir, Charles recalled that songs she performed included "Sighing Innocents", "Poor Cow", "Good Tradition" and "Cathedral Song".

Charles arranged for a new demo tape to be produced at the home studio of Hugh Murphy, whom he had met through Murphy's work with Gerry Rafferty. Murphy had previously been engaged by Charles to work on Paul Brady's album Hard Station (1981). The demo recording took place at the end of January, and 19 songs were recorded, starting with "Cathedral Song". After representatives from London Records heard the tape, they agreed to fund a further recording session, with Peter Van Hooke and Rod Argent as producers. (Note: Recollections differ: Charles wrote that he had chosen Van Hooke as producer and Van Hooke had brought Argent in for the London Records session and recommended to WEA that they were retained for later sessions. Tikaram later recalled that, after she signed with WEA, the label suggested Argent and Van Hooke as co-producers.)

During the following months, Tikaram played London clubs and support appearances, and she signed with WEA in March 1988. Charles said in 1990 that he and Tikaram had agreed that WEA was the best option because "they were most into what she was doing for the right reasons" and had a track record of working internationally with artists of the same type such as Mitchell, Jackson Browne and Paul Simon. Music Week characterised her as part of the renewed interest in singer-songwriters but noted that she did not see herself as simply one of a new group of women performers.

Tikaram wrote much of the album over a relatively short period while studying for her A-levels. In 2018, she said that the process had been instinctive: melodies and words were usually written together and she did little editing. In a 2019 interview, she described recording the album as a relaxed introduction to professional studio work, recalling Argent and Van Hooke as being supportive rather than prescriptive producers.

== Composition, recording and production ==
Tikaram in 1988

Tikaram wrote all the lyrics and music for Ancient Heart. Her early songwriting drew on literature as well as singer-songwriters. Ancient Heart was engineered by Simon Hurrell at Red House Studio in Silsoe, Argent's home studio, during April, June and July 1988. Tikaram, Argent and Van Hooke were credited as arrangers, with Argent arranging the string quartet; Argent, Van Hooke and Hurrell mixed the record. Tikaram recollected that the two producers had distinct responsibilities but worked closely together, describing the sessions as "a lovely summer". She said that the producers "were particularly good at finding the right voicing for a song."

Argent recalled that Tikaram did not have experience of working with a band and was most comfortable performing with guitar and voice. Van Hooke therefore created a simple guide rhythm while Tikaram recorded a vocal and guitar performance. The guide was then removed and the producers developed the arrangement around the original performance, sometimes altering the supporting harmony while retaining the vocal at its centre. This approach was used throughout the album and allowed the arrangements to become elaborate without displacing Tikaram's delivery, according to Argent.

Tikaram recalled being allowed to suggest musicians, and among her suggestions were Helen O'Hara, David Lindley, Marc Ribot and Brady, all of whom played in the recording sessions. Tikaram said that O'Hara's violin playing gave the track "Good Tradition" a Celtic character. Brady contributed mandolin. Mark Isham played trumpet and flugelhorn, notably on "For All These Years". "Twist in My Sobriety" grew from a guitar figure and Tikaram's idea for an oboe line. A synthesised guide part was used while the arrangement was developed, before Malcolm Messiter recorded the final part.

Tikaram described her songs as "one part elaborate code and one part 'feet-off-the-ground' logic." Richard Harrington of The Washington Post described the lyrics as elliptical and sometimes obscure, but argued that their effect depended as much on sound and phrasing as literal meaning. Tikaram told him that, even before writing songs, she had read her prose aloud and recorded herself to hear how the words sounded. Contemporary reviews by Joe Brown in The Washington Post and Holly Gleason of Rolling Stone highlighted the album's combination of youthful subject matter and unusually low vocal register as central to its character.

"Good Tradition" was conceived as a simple, lively song. Tikaram later connected its musical directness to her experience of listening to Nina Simone, particularly "Real Real", while the lyrics grew out of her interest in the contradictory qualities of family life. She said that discussions of family and domestic symbolism while studying Charles Dickens's novel Our Mutual Friend also contributed to the song. The recording features violin by O'Hara and mandolin by Brady. Gleason described the production as combining Celtic elements with accessible pop.

The album's title comes from the lyrics of "Cathedral Song". Tikaram described the song as about the "enormity" of love, while "Sighing Innocents" dealt with adolescence. Tikaram said that "Poor Cow" was about an awkward young woman who did not fit in and later called it the album's most specifically Basingstoke-rooted song.

Tikaram has said that the title "Twist in My Sobriety" is not a reference to alcohol, but is about teenage alienation, moral unease and her awareness of injustice. Its first line was prompted by the title of Maya Angelou's book All God's Children Need Traveling Shoes rather than quoted from the book. Gleason contrasted the song's haunting midtempo sound with the more buoyant, fiddle-led "Good Tradition". She described "For All These Years" as a desolate song about the difficulty of bridging emotional and other distances, heightened by Isham's flugelhorn. Sean Egan of Classic Pop saw links between "He Likes the Sun" and the soul and blues records owned by Tikaram's father that she had listened to. Tikaram described "Valentine Heart" as a romantic song whose solitary central figure imagines love.

== Release and promotion ==
WEA listed Ancient Heart among its new albums for September 1988, on LP, cassette and compact disc. It was released in the UK on 12 September. The first single, "Good Tradition", had entered the UK chart in July 1988 and climbed upwards, reaching number 10 on the UK Singles Chart in August. Tikaram performed at the Cambridge Folk Festival in July and one of her sets was recorded and broadcast by BBC Radio 1 in September. She appeared on Top of the Pops in August.

"Twist in My Sobriety" followed as a single in October 1988. It peaked at number 22 in the UK but reached the top ten in several European markets, including number two in Austria and West Germany. Reprise released the album in the United States on 6 December 1988. "Cathedral Song" was issued in the UK in January 1989, followed by "World Outside Your Window" in February; they reached numbers 48 and 58 respectively in the UK.

The promotional video for "Twist in My Sobriety", directed by Gerard de Thame, was filmed in Bolivia and at Bell Studios in London. The video uses sepia-toned images of rural life, which İbrahim E. Bilici and Ayça Bilmez later analysed in terms of contrasts between poverty and wealth, and between religious imagery and everyday hardship. By April 1989, Harrington reported that the video was receiving substantial exposure on both MTV and VH1 in the United States. It was nominated for Best Female Video at the 1989 MTV Video Music Awards. The video for "Cathedral Song" subsequently received Yellow Pencil awards for Direction and for Most Outstanding Pop Promo in D&AD's Music Videos category in 1990.

Tikaram toured Britain during the second half of 1988, around the album's release and again in November and December. Reviewing a December performance at London's Dominion Theatre, Peter Kane of Sounds described the speed of her transition from an inexperienced support act to a headliner and called the album notably accomplished. Touring continued through Europe and North America in 1989. One of her Norwegian shows was filmed and televised on Channel 4 in the UK in January 1990.

== Critical reception ==
Professional ratings
Review scores
Source	Rating
AllMusic	4.5/5 stars
Robert Christgau	B
New Musical Express	6/10 stars
Record Mirror	3.5/5 stars
Smash Hits	7/10 stars
Sounds	4/5 stars
Q	3/5 stars

British reviews commented on Tikaram's age, voice and arrangements. Robin Denselow of The Guardian praised her ability to write melodies and singled out "World Outside Your Window", noting its understated reggae inflection. The Times reviewer David Sinclair found greater depth in the album than the first single, "Good Tradition", had suggested, and praised Tikaram's contralto. He considered some lyrics naïve, but praised her portrayal of moods and the varied arrangements, describing "Sighing Innocents" as a bluesy shuffle, "Valentine Heart" as chamber pop and "For All These Years" as having a jazz ensemble setting. Mat Snow of Sounds admired the tension between youthful writing and an authoritative voice, and felt the arrangements gave each song a distinct identity while keeping Tikaram's singing central. Johnny Dee in Record Mirror regarded Tikaram's voice as the album's strongest asset. He praised "Good Tradition", "Poor Cow" and "World Outside Your Window", while finding most of the album restrained and close to middle-of-the-road pop; nevertheless, he thought it heralded a lasting career.

In Smash Hits, Ian Cranna marked the album seven out of ten: he noted its unusual mix of styles and found some of Tikaram's observations interesting, but thought the lyrics too often descended into pretentious obscurity. Stuart Bailie of NME praised "Good Tradition" and O'Hara's violin playing, but thought that the rest of the album was too studied and earnest to have comparable emotional impact. Chris Heath, reviewing it for Q, favoured the shorter songs, including "Good Tradition", "Cathedral Song" and "Poor Cow". He gave the album three stars out of five and called it a promising but incomplete debut. At the end of the year, Q included Ancient Heart in its selection of the 50 best albums of 1988.

Of the American reviewers, Joe Brown of The Washington Post called the debut quietly striking and argued that, despite comparisons with Tracy Chapman and Suzanne Vega, Tikaram had an individual style. He praised the elliptical songwriting, conversational vocal delivery and the understated mixture of acoustic and electronic instruments. Steve Morse of The Boston Globe described the record as a haunting debut whose lush arrangements supported melancholic songs about displacement and the loss of innocence. Billboard likewise highlighted the maturity of her singing and the combination of simplicity and sophistication in the songwriting, while observing that the album was difficult to categorise. Jane Garcia of Spin admired Tikaram's voice and "Twist in My Sobriety" but criticised some of the lyrics as self-consciously adult and the songwriting as uneven.

Stephen Holden of The New York Times focused on the discrepancy between Tikaram's age and the record's sombre ballads, comparing the colour of her contralto with singers such as Nico and Grace Jones, and praising the string and horn arrangements. In Rolling Stone, Gleason heard the influence of Mitchell and Morrison in songs that moved between restrained drama and brighter pop. She praised Argent and Van Hooke's balance of Celtic colour and pop production and singled out "For All These Years", with Isham's flugelhorn, as one of the album's strongest tracks.

Tikaram was nominated for Best British Female Artist at the Brit Awards 1989, and "Twist in My Sobriety" was nominated for Best British Single. At the end of 1989, Music & Media magazine reviewed the best-selling singles and albums throughout Europe in 1989, and identified Tikaram as the third-most successful female artist of the year.

== Commercial performance ==
Ancient Heart entered the UK Albums Chart at number 13 in September 1988. After falling to number 50 at the end of December, it returned to the top 20 in January 1989. The album reached its UK peak of number three in March 1989 and accumulated 49 weeks in the top 100, including nine weeks in the top ten. In July 1989 WEA presented Tikaram with a double-platinum award; Music & Media reported at the time that worldwide sales had passed 2.5 million.

The album reached number one in Austria, West Germany, Norway and Switzerland, number four in the Netherlands and number eight in Sweden. Music & Media reported in March 1989 that the album had sold 202,000 copies in Norway, describing it as the country's best-selling international debut album. It also topped Music & Media's European Top 100 Albums chart for two weeks in March 1989.

Outside Europe, Ancient Heart reached number 31 in Australia, number 23 in New Zealand and number 59 on the US Billboard 200. WEA had not expected such a high level of sales; in 2005 Sullivan reported that the label had anticipated about 40,000 copies, while the worldwide total had reached approximately four million.

== Retrospective assessment ==
The Rolling Stone Album Guide (1992) gave Ancient Heart two-and-a-half out of five stars, describing its mood as pensive and mildly Celtic and noting the sophistication of Rod Argent's arrangements. In a retrospective write-up for AllMusic, Jose F. Promis argued that the album had aged well and was underrated, describing it as a "melancholy and wistful work, mature beyond her years, of startling originality and honesty." Reviewing a 1995 CD reissue in Q, Sam Taylor gave Ancient Heart three out of five stars. He found the album less exciting than its singles, although he identified "I Love You" and "Cathedral Song" as creative highlights and called the album well crafted and intelligent.

Martin C. Strong, in his The Great Rock Discography (2000), rated the album seven out of ten and characterised Tikaram's early music as moody, intense pop folk reminiscent of Cohen and Mitchell. In the 2007 edition of The Encyclopedia of Popular Music, Colin Larkin gave Ancient Heart four stars out of five, and wrote that "Tikaram became a role model for artists aspiring to emulate late 60s bed-sitter singer-songwriters."

For its 30th anniversary, Ancient Heart was reissued in December 2018 as a numbered clear-vinyl edition limited to 1,500 copies, with a new note by Tikaram. A CD edition added the bonus tracks "Friends" and "I Love the Heaven's Solo". In Music Week, Alan Jones described the album as a personal, melancholic record whose enduring centrepiece was "Twist in My Sobriety". Jones, like Egan writing two months later, felt that "Twist in My Sobriety" had become Tikaram's signature song; Strong considered it her finest work. Reviewing a reissue for Classic Pop in 2020, Wyndham Wallace gave the album seven out of ten and contrasted the appeal of "Good Tradition" with the often downcast songs elsewhere on the record. The album was remastered again for the five-CD box set The WEA / EastWest Albums 1988–1995 (2024), where it was accompanied by seven B-sides, edits, instrumentals and demos.

Tikaram said that she revisited the album's themes in 2025 with LIAR (Love Isn't a Right). She described the two records as mirrors rather than a conventional sequel: Ancient Heart reflected a teenager searching for identity and belonging, whereas LIAR considered a changing world from the perspective of someone who had since found her place in it. Reviewing LIAR for musicOMH, John Murphy felt that there was a continuity in the voice and atmosphere, noting O'Hara's return on violin, and suggested that LIAR was more subdued.

== Track listing and credits ==
Ancient Heart track listing. All songs were composed by Tanita Tikaram
No.	Title	Musicians	Length
1	"Good Tradition"	Tanita Tikaram – vocals, guitar; Rod Argent – keyboards; Peter Van Hooke – drums; Rory McFarlane – bass guitar; Paul Brady – mandolin; Helen O'Hara – violin; Phil Todd – saxophone; Pete Beachill – trombone; Noel Langley – trumpet	2:49
2	"Cathedral Song"	Tanita Tikaram – vocals; Mitch Dalton – guitar; Rod Argent – keyboards; Peter Van Hooke – drums; Rory McFarlane – bass guitar	2:51
3	"Sighing Innocents"	Tanita Tikaram – vocals, guitar; Marc Ribot – guitar, E-horn; Rod Argent – keyboards; Peter Van Hooke – drums; Rory McFarlane – bass guitar; Martin Ditcham – percussion	3:31
4	"I Love You"	Tanita Tikaram – vocals; Mitch Dalton – guitar; Rory McFarlane – bass guitar	2:45
5	"World Outside Your Window"	Tanita Tikaram – vocals, guitar; Mark Creswell – guitar; David Lindley – violin; Rod Argent – keyboards; Peter Van Hooke – drums; Rory McFarlane – bass guitar; Martin Ditcham – percussion	4:52
6	"For All These Years"	Tanita Tikaram – vocals; Mark Isham – trumpet, flugelhorn; Rod Argent – keyboards; Peter Van Hooke – drums; Rory McFarlane – bass guitar	5:13
7	"Twist in My Sobriety"	Tanita Tikaram – vocals, guitar; Rod Argent – keyboards; Peter Van Hooke – drums; Malcolm Messiter – oboe	4:50
8	"Poor Cow"	Tanita Tikaram – vocals, guitar; Mitch Dalton – guitar; Rod Argent – keyboards; Peter Van Hooke – drums; Rory McFarlane – bass guitar	1:56
9	"He Likes the Sun"	Tanita Tikaram – vocals, guitar; Brendan Croker, Clem Clempson – guitar; Mark Creswell – guitar; Rod Argent – keyboards; Peter Van Hooke – drums; Keith Harvey – cello; Ian Jewell – viola; Brendan O'Reilly and John Georgiadis – violin; Martin Ditcham – percussion	5:26
10	"Valentine Heart"	Tanita Tikaram – vocals, guitar; Rod Argent – keyboards; Peter Van Hooke – drums; Mo Foster – fretless bass; Keith Harvey – cello; Ian Jewell – viola; Brendan O'Reilly and John Georgiadis – violin	4:04
11	"Preyed Upon"	Tanita Tikaram – vocals; Rod Argent – keyboards; Peter Van Hooke – drums; Keith Harvey – cello; Ian Jewell – viola; Brendan O'Reilly and John Georgiadis – violin	5:03

=== Production and artwork ===
From the album liner notes:

- Rod Argent – producer, arranger, string-quartet arrangements, mixing
- Peter Van Hooke – producer, arranger, mixing
- Tanita Tikaram – arranger
- Simon Hurrell – engineer, mixing
- Peter Moss – photography
- T&CP Associates – design

== Charts ==
Chart (1988–89)	Peak position
Australian Albums Chart	31
Austrian Albums Chart	1
Canada Albums Chart	22
Dutch Albums Chart	4
European Albums (Music & Media)	1
The Official Finnish Charts	2
German Albums Chart	1
Greek Albums (IFPI Greece)	1
Icelandic Albums (Tónlist)	9
Italian Albums (Musica e dischi)	3
New Zealand Albums Chart	23
Norwegian Albums Chart	1
Swedish Albums Chart	8
Swiss Albums Chart	1
UK Albums Chart	3
US Billboard 200	59
US Cash Box Top 200 Albums	65

== Certifications and sales ==
Region	Certification	Certified units/sales
Australia (ARIA)	Gold	35,000^{^}
Belgium and Luxembourg	Gold	25,000
Finland (Musiikkituottajat)	Gold	26,667
France (SNEP)	2× Gold	200,000^{*}
Germany (BVMI)	3× Gold	750,000^{^}
Hungary	Gold	50,000
Italy (FIMI)	Platinum	200,000
Netherlands (NVPI)	Platinum	100,000^{^}
Norway	—	202,000
Spain (Promusicae)	Gold	50,000^{^}
Sweden (GLF)	Gold	50,000^{^}
Switzerland (IFPI Switzerland)	Platinum	50,000^{^}
United Kingdom (BPI)	2× Platinum	600,000^{^}
Summaries
Worldwide	—	4,000,000
^{*} Sales figures based on certification alone.^{^} Shipments figures based on certification alone.
