= Richard Morton (comedian) =

English comedian and musician

Richard Morton is a British comedian, musician, songwriter, and composer from North East England who became known as a founder member of the London Comedy Store's "Cutting Edge" show. He is best known as a 1992 winner of the Time Out Comedy Award, one half of musical act The Panic Brothers and for The Jack Dee Show (ITV) and The Comedy Store TV series on Channel 5.

== Early life and education ==
Morton was born in Singapore moving to Newcastle, in North East England and then Hexham, Northumberland. He attended the Queen Elizabeth High School, Hexham.

After gigging with several rock bands in his native North East, Morton moved to London in the late 1970s to pursue his music, and later, comedy career.

== Music career / The Panic Brothers ==
Morton initially worked as a musician, touring pubs and small venues, but became a comedian "by default": "I'd lark around on stage, not finishing the songs properly. It's difficult to stand in such an intimate venue and pretend to be David Bowie. So I started chatting to the audience and making them laugh."

In 1985, having been signed by a management company, Morton formed the close harmony singing duo The Panic Brothers with singer/songwriter Reg Meuross. Beginning on the London pub rock circuit, they established themselves as a live act, supporting musicians and comedians and appearing at the GLC Farewell Festival.

John Conquest wrote in Time Out magazine in June 1987: “Their combination of sharp, witty songs, tight harmonies and powerful acoustic guitars have gained them an enormous following.” Mark Kermode said, "I [fell] in love with The Panic Brothers, a duo who looked and sounded like The Everly Brothers but with a post-punk twist. I would sit there studying their act, marvelling at their musical brilliance, mesmerised by their comic timing."

In 1987 The Panic Brothers released a vinyl mini LP, In The Red (Topic Records), produced by Clive Gregson and featuring guest musicians including Geraint Watkins and BJ Cole. It was used as the soundtrack for the TV play Biting The Hand, part of BBC One drama series The Play On One. Andy White wrote in Music Week in November 1987: "Excellent snappy songs, booming acoustic guitars and perfect harmonies are the Panic's trademarks."

Morton and Meuross' act featured at the 1987 Edinburgh Festival Fringe with Norman Lovett, and they later performed a three-week run with Mark Steel at The Assembly Rooms, followed by a UK tour. In 1989, they performed their own show, The Panic Brothers Hold Their Own.

The duo appeared on a host of TV shows, most famously Friday Night Live hosted by Ben Elton. They were special guests in At Home With The Hardys, at The Lyric, Hammersmith starring Jeremy Hardy, Kit Hollerbach, Paul B Davies and Caroline Eddy.

The act disbanded in 1990, but reformed for a series of reunion gigs in 2014 coinciding with the release of their digitally re-mastered album.

== Musical comedy career ==
Working solo, Morton came to prominence as a musical comedian in the British alternative comedy scene of the late eighties and early nineties and was a founder member of The Comedy Store's Cutting Edge show along with Mark Thomas, Kevin Day, Dave Cohen, Bob Boyton, and Linda Smith. He performed regularly at the Edinburgh Festival Fringe between 1990 and 2001, both with his own show and with fellow comedians including Jenny Lecoat, Fred MacAulay, Lynn Ferguson and Jo Brand. He featured in numerous Best Of The Fest shows at the Playhouse Theatre. A Sunday Times review by Mark Edwards at the time said, "The audience laughed longer and louder at Morton than at any other comedian I've seen at the Fringe."

Morton was a winner of the Time Out Comedy Award in 1992. The Awards ran from 1991 to 2006 and were bestowed by the London listings magazine Time Out. The judges awarded Morton Time Out Comedy Awards “For his comic songs and all-round talent as a comedian, together with his ability to achieve striking collaborations with other performers.”

In Autumn 1994 Morton headlined his own UK tour.

Morton supported comedians including Lee Evans and Jack Dee where he was described as "the most adept support act on the circuit". His regular spot in the show saw him described as "the perfect foil for Dee, who owes him a significant debt for Morton's effervescent, life-affirming act complements Dee's caustic observations like a refreshing aperatif before a hearty meal." He was also warm-up act for Peter Kay’s Comedy Store Channel 5 TV Special.

In her book Can't Stand Up for Sitting Down, Jo Brand said: "I toured for a while with Richard Morton, who was always great to be with. Richard is such a lovable guy so helpful, friendly and sweet natured. He almost makes me feel guilty for existing. He’s a Geordie, but an atypical one given that he is small and slim and unmacho. He was unerringly cheerful when we toured and believe you me unerringly cheerful isn’t the default position of most comedians."

On TV and radio Morton was a guest on Nothing Like A Royal Show (ITV) performing the comedy song My Daddy Was A Sperm Bank and The Jack Dee Show (ITV) performing "The Bobbit Song". He was a regular contributor to Loose Ends (Radio 4) hosted by Ned Sherrin, and guested on popular comedy panel game show Just A Minute.

In 1995 Morton took a role in the Bafta Award-winning series Our Friends in the North (BBC 2), and later acted in several episodes of mockumentary series Jack & Jeremy's Real Lives (Channel 4), as well as composing a title song for their earlier show, Jack and Jeremy's Police 4.

Morton appeared in his own Channel 5 Comedy Store Special in 1997, going on to feature in three series of the show. He had regular guest spots on a range of Channel 5 panel shows including Bring Me the Head of Light Entertainment, Tibs & Fibs, Live & Dangerous, Night Fever, The Jack Docherty Show and was a regular panellist on two series of WowFabGroovy!.

Also for Channel 5, Morton presented the quiz series Move On Up, and co-presented Win Beadle's Money.

Morton hosted a six-part series Stand Up 2 (Radio 2) featuring Barry Cryer and Ross Noble and was a weekly panellist on the series Cross-Questioned (Radio 4) hosted by Caroline Quentin. In the early 2000s, he was a regular guest on the musically themed show, Jammin’.

Morton returned to music in 2010, forming The Rich Morton Sound with musician/producer Dave O’Brien. They released a concept album, The Theme That Never Was, featuring newly composed instrumental themes for imaginary films and TV shows of the 60s and 70s.

The record was released on their own label, Homage To Fromage, and distributed worldwide by Proper Records. The track Storm the Embassy featured on The Word magazine CD Now Hear This in March 2010. In 2013, they released the follow-up album, The Sequel That Never Was.

Morton composed the theme for the Vic Reeves’ Radio 2 series Does the Team Think… and his track Colour Me Groovy was used both as the theme for two series of Bennett Arron Worries About... on BBC Radio Wales and the You Heard It Here First podcast for BBC Comedy of the Week. He co-wrote the song, Lard with Jo Brand for her Channel 4 special All the Way To Worcester and Can't Help Crying At Christmas, with Rich Hall and Andy Davies for Jack Dee's Sunday Service.

Morton wrote and presented documentaries for BBC Radio 4: In The Lounge With Rich Morton which remains available on BBC iPlayer, I Can’t Stand Up For Falling Down, The Lost Art of the TV Theme, as well as appearing in Fred At The Stand. He presented Ho'way The Laughs, a two part series about Geordie comedy.
