= Chris Neill =

British comedian, producer and writer (born 1968)

Chris Neill (born 1968) is a British comedian, producer and writer who features regularly on BBC Radio 4 and BBC Radio Scotland. As a stand-up comedian on the UK circuit, he has presented five solo shows on the Edinburgh Festival Fringe since 2002.

== Early career ==
Chris Neill began his career producing comedy and entertainment shows for BBC Radio between 1993 and 2000. Since then, he has continued to make shows for BBC radio networks as a freelancer. His productions include The Hudson and Pepperdine Show, Just A Minute, The News Huddlines, Week Ending, Lee and Herring, Rainer Hersch's 20th Century Retrospective, Kit and the Widow - Sanitised for the Wireless, It's That Jo Caulfield Again, Quote... Unquote, Miranda Hart's House Party, Cambridge Footlights: A Retrospective, ... by Woody Allen, Clement Doesn't Live Here Anymore, Why the Big Pause? Talk of New York, and Sean Lock's 15 Storeys High.

== Comedy roles and performances ==
In 2000, Neill became a panellist on shows such as Just a Minute, The Motion Show, and Quote... Unquote. In Linda Smith's A Brief History of Timewasting, written by and featuring the comedian, he had a regular role as Chris, the live-in builder with a fear of completing any job. He also had cameo roles in Sean Lock's 15 Storeys High and The Hudson and Pepperdine Show, as well as writing and presenting a Radio 4 documentary about the legendary Round the Horne star, Betty Marsden. He has regularly contributed to the Sunday-morning news magazine programme, Broadcasting House, as well as presenting a weekly feature on MacAulay & Co on BBC Radio Scotland. In 2005, 2006, 2008, and 2009, he co-hosted elements of MacAulay & Co along with Fred MacAulay and Sue Perkins as it was broadcast from the Spiegel Tent every morning during two weeks of the Edinburgh Festival. His Radio 4 and 4 extra autobiographical comedy show "Woof" features Martin Hyder, Alison Steadman and Isy Suttie.

Neill made his début as a stand-up comedian at the Edinburgh Fringe in 2002 with his show Does it With Strangers at the Pleasance, and he returned to the Edinburgh Fringe in 2004 with The BBC, Andrew Gilligan, and Me and in 2005 with Middle Class Misery — the Board Game, both also at the Pleasance and in 2006, with his show Everybody Hates Chris (Neill) at the Underbelly and in 2008 with Chris Neill's Got a Bun in the Oven at the Assembly Rooms. He was a core performer in Robin Ince's Book Club, both in London and on national tour, and has also worked as a television warm-up artist.

== Other roles ==
Neill also performs as a radio actor and as a voice-over artist. In 2006, he played Sir James Tyrrell in the Doctor Who audio drama The Kingmaker. He has recorded the voice of Lord Cutler Beckett for the Disney video game, Pirates of the Caribbean: Armada of the Damned and voiced the part of Owl in all 52 episodes of the animation Poppy Cat for Nick Jr. He has also lent his voice to the English dub of a French animated series called Lilybuds made for Zodiak Kids voicing Zinnia's jerboa, Spearmint.
