= Isobel Barnett =

Scottish television personality (1918–1980)

Isobel, Lady Barnett
- Born: Isobel Morag Marshall; 30 June 1918; Aberdeen, Scotland
- Died: 20 October 1980 (aged 62); Cossington, Leicestershire, England
- Occupations: Medical Doctor; Radio and television personality Justice of the peace
- Years active: 1940–1980
- Known for: Broadcasting career
- Notable work: What's My Line
- Spouse: Geoffrey Barnett (m. 1941; died 1970)
- Children: 1

Isobel, Lady Barnett (born Isobel Morag Marshall; 30 June 1918 – 20 October 1980), was a Scottish radio and television personality, who had her highest profile during the 1950s and 1960s.

== Early life ==
Isobel Barnett was born Isobel Morag Marshall on 30 June 1918 in Aberdeen, Scotland, the daughter of a neurologist, Robert McNab Marshall, and Jane Minty. Her father was a respected physician in Glasgow who was serving in the army during World War I at the time of her birth and her mother went to her parents' home in Aberdeen where Barnett was born. She attended the Laurel Bank School in Glasgow and the independent Mount School in York.

Following in her father's footsteps, she studied medicine at the University of Glasgow and qualified as a doctor in 1940. She worked as a general practitioner in Leicester during World War II where she met and, in 1941, married solicitor and company director Geoffrey Barnett, later Lord Mayor of Leicester, who was knighted for political and public services to the city of Leicester in 1953. Lady Barnett gave up her medical career in 1948, and for the next 20 years was a Justice of the Peace.

== Radio and television ==
In 1953 Barnett arrived on BBC television as one of the panel of What's My Line?, which made her a household name. She appeared on the programme for ten years but was not an original panelist, her seat having been previously occupied by Marghanita Laski.

She was regarded by audiences as elegant and witty, the epitome of the British aristocracy, although her title actually came from the fact that her solicitor husband had been knighted; the form Lady Barnett suggested she possessed a courtesy title, but she was not an aristocrat, nor had she married into the aristocracy. She also made regular appearances on the BBC radio series Any Questions, on the radio panel game Many a Slip and on the women's discussion series Petticoat Line. She was greatly in demand as an after-dinner speaker.

In 1956, a reviewer predicted that an alien visiting from another planet could ask anyone between the ages of seven and 70 "What is What's my Line?" and "Who is Isobel Barnett?" and be confident of getting an answer. She featured in the first revival of What's My Line? which ran for two series from 1973 to 1974.

== Later life and death ==
In her last years Barnett became reclusive and eccentric. In 1980 she was found guilty of shoplifting, and fined £75 for stealing a can of tuna and a carton of cream worth 87 pence from her village grocer. This brought her briefly back into the public eye; four days later on 20 October, she was found dead at her home in Cossington, Leicestershire.

A coroner's inquest subsequently ruled that Barnett killed herself by deliberately ingesting 10 to 12 tablets of Distalgesic, a painkiller, in her bath. During the inquest, police testified that she wore an extra spacious pocket, known as a poacher's pocket, inside her coat when she was caught stealing the groceries. Two days before her death, Lady Barnett told an interviewer she was a compulsive thief and had been shoplifting for years. Finding that Barnett, a trained physician, killed herself deliberately with an overdose of arthritis painkiller, the coroner, Guy Toone, said, "She had recently suffered one of the most traumatic experiences any woman could suffer". Toone went on to say, "I am satisfied she took a fatal overdose deliberately and knew what she was doing".

Barnett's story was recounted by several of her friends and colleagues in a 1991 BBC Radio 4 documentary in the Radio Lives series, in which it was said that she gave no indication to any of her friends that she was planning to take her own life, and that she kept up a façade of "business as usual".

Writing in the Leicester Gazette in 2025, Paul Stenning cast doubt on the coroner's verdict, quoting an earlier statement by Dista Products, the manufacturers of Distalgesic, that 10 to 12, or even 40, tablets of Distalgesic would not be a fateful dose.

Following this was a second piece by Stenning which appeared on the 46th anniversary of Lady Barnett's death in the Leicester Gazette.

== Personal life ==
Barnett had one son, Alastair (who died 31 March 2020 aged 77). Her husband died in 1970. Her autobiography, My Life Line, was published in 1956.
