= Many a Slip (radio series) =

British radio panel game show (1964–1979)

- Genre: Panel game
- Running time: 30 minutes
- Country of origin: United Kingdom
- Language(s): English
- Home station: BBC Light Programme; BBC Radio 2; BBC Radio 4
- Syndicates: BBC Home Service; BBC Radio 4 Extra
- Hosted by: Roy Plomley; Steve Race at the piano
- Starring: Isobel Barnett; Richard Murdoch; Lance Percival; Gillian Reynolds; Tim Rice; Eleanor Summerfield
- Created by: Ian Messiter
- Written by: Ian Messiter
- Produced by: Charles Maxwell; Tony Luke; Peter Titheradge; Martin Fisher; Paul Mayhew-Archer
- Recording studio: Paris Theatre, London
- Original release: 17 March 1964 – 4 December 1979
- Website: www.bbc.co.uk/programmes/b09tc7w5

Many a Slip is a British panel game created by Ian Messiter which was broadcast from 1964 to 1979. It was chaired by Roy Plomley, with a musical mistakes round supplied by Steve Race. The title of the show is a reference to the English proverb "There's many a slip twixt the cup and the lip".

The BBC received requests from school teachers and lecturers for transcripts of Ian Messiter's pieces as a fun way of teaching educational subjects to pupils.

== Contestants ==
For the first couple of series, the contestants were Isobel Barnett and Eleanor Summerfield versus Richard Murdoch and Lance Percival. Temporary replacements for Lance Percival in the first series (each for one show) were Kenneth Horne, Terence Alexander and Jon Pertwee.

When the annual radio series returned, magician David Nixon replaced Lance Percival. When Nixon died in 1978, Percival returned to the show,

In the early 1970s, Isobel Barnett and Richard Murdoch were replaced by Katharine Whitehorn and Paul Jennings. The new panellists were replaced after only one series by Tim Rice and Gillian Reynolds who remained until the show ended in 1979.

Over 250 shows were recorded. Roy Plomley was in every show but Steve Race missed a few shows due to illness and was replaced by pianist Alan Paul. Eleanor Summerfield only missed two shows; her temporary replacement was Andrée Melly. The only other stand-in player for one show was Graeme Garden.

== Format ==
In a typical round, Plomley read out a piece of text prepared by Messiter, and contestants buzzed in if they detected an error. Correctly identifying an error scored one point and supplying a correction was worth a second; if a contestant buzzed in when there was no error, two points were awarded to the opposing team. Occasionally a third point was awarded when a contestant spotted a mistake Messiter had not intended.

Mid-way through each show, for one round, Plomley handed over to "our musical mistakes man, Steve Race", who would play short extracts from well-known pieces of music, each preceded by a spoken introduction, while contestants attempted to detect errors in the introduction, the piece, or both. A regular feature was a memory round: Plomley read a short piece, usually of verse or song lyrics, then read it again later on in the show with funny alterations which the teams scored points for correcting. Other regular features were the Many a Slip library with its books of incorrect titles and authors; a murder mystery round with the Many a Slip detective; travelogues of different countries and the Many a Slip chef and his way of cooking with ingredients that no sane chef would use.

For each series, the chairman kept a running total of how many games each team had won and in the last show he announced which team had won the series.

== Broadcast information ==
From its inception in 1964, Many a Slip was broadcast on the BBC Light Programme, with the programme repeated the same week on the BBC Home Service. In July 1969, this changed, with the original broadcast now on BBC Radio 4 and the repeats on BBC Radio 2. Radio 2 stopped broadcasting the weekly repeats in 1970.

The BBC's archive digital radio station, BBC Radio 4 Extra, occasionally broadcasts repeats of the show.

The show was played on Saturday nights on RNZ National (then known as National Radio) in New Zealand in the 1980s.

== Other versions and connections to other shows ==
In the mid-1960s, Many a Slip was tried out on television for one series. Peter Haigh took over as chairman and Steve Race's contribution was replaced by a spot the mistakes in the picture round, but it was deemed too static for TV.

Personnel from Many a Slip took part in two special editions of Brain of Britain in which they were pitted against the current year's Brain of Brains. The first, in 1970, featured Eleanor Summerfield, Richard Murdoch and Roy Plomley and was chaired by Franklin Engelmann. The second, in 1976, featured Eleanor Summerfield, David Nixon, Tim Rice and Gillian Reynolds and was chaired by Robert Robinson.

In the first series of Just a Minute after Kenneth Williams died in 1988, for a double recording at the Paris Studio in Lower Regent Street (the home of many Many a Slip recordings), Many a Slip one-time team-mates Richard Murdoch and Lance Percival were reunited to do battle against Clement Freud and Wendy Richard in another of Ian Messiter's panel games. Richard Murdoch remained a regular guest on Just a Minute until he died in 1990.

In the late 1990s, the BBC recorded a pilot of Many a Slip at the Radio Theatre in Broadcasting House. The show's new host was one-time fill-in panellist Graeme Garden. The teams were Helen Lederer and Lorelei King versus Miles Kington and David Stafford. The show had a new musical mistakes man at the piano.

== Theme music ==
The theme music for the series was composed by John Baker at the BBC Radiophonic Workshop.

== Sources ==
- BBC Public Archives in Caversham, Berkshire.
- Messiter, Ian (1990). My Life and Other Games. London: Fourth Estate. ISBN 978-1872180618. OCLC 924879009.
- "Many a Slip". UKGameshows.com.
