= Petticoat Line =

BBC radio all-woman panel show (1965–1976)

Petticoat Line was an all-woman panel show on the BBC Home Service (from 1967 this became BBC Radio 4) chaired by Anona Winn which discussed listeners' letters and problems. It started on 6 January 1965 and ran for 11 years. It was devised by Anona Winn and Ian Messiter. The panellists always included Renée Houston (who was rationed to saying "bloody" no more than three times per show); Sheila van Damm and Katharine Whitehorn also appeared quite often. Winn originally proposed a more serious show called The Ombudswomen but this lighter and funnier show came into existence instead.

== Signature tune ==
The music which introduced and ended each edition was "Fluter's Holiday", by Bert Kaempfert and his orchestra.
