= Time Out Comedy Awards =

- Description: Awards bestowed upon the comedy community by the London listings magazine Time Out
- Country: United Kingdom
- Presented by: Time Out
- Status: Concluded

The Time Out Comedy Awards were bestowed upon the comedy community by the London listings magazine Time Out. They ran from 1991 to 2006, and include many well-known comedians as past winners: Eddie Izzard, Noel Fielding and Jimmy Carr. It is not known why they have been defunct since 2006.

== Winners ==
=== 1991 ===
- Pat Condell
- Eddie Izzard
- Martin Soan

=== 1992 ===
- Boothby Graffoe
- Lee Evans
- Richard Morton
- Mark Hurst -Outstanding Contribution to Comedy

=== 1993 ===
- Simon Bligh
- Felix Dexter
- Kevin Day

=== 1994 ===
- Harry Hill
- Owen O'Neill
- Phill Jupitus

=== 1995 ===
- Bill Bailey
- Sean Lock

=== 1996 ===
Best character comedian

- Al Murray

Best stand-up

- Paul Tonkinson

Special award:

- Peter Grahame

=== 1997 ===
Best stand-up

- Sean Meo

Best female comic

- Mandy Knight

Best comedy club

- Banana Cabaret

=== 1998 ===
Outstanding achievement

- Malcolm Hardee

Best stand-up

- Adam Bloom

Best comedy performer

- Phil Nichol

=== 2001 ===
Best stand-up

- Omid Djalili

Best comedy performances

- Lee Mack

Outstanding achievement award

- Lee Hurst

=== 2002 ===
Best stand-up

- Mike Wilmot

Best comedy performances

- Daniel Kitson

Outstanding achievement award

- Andy Parsons

=== 2003 ===
Best stand-up

- Jimmy Carr

Best comedy performances

- Milton Jones

Outstanding achievement award

- Noel Fielding

=== 2004 ===
Special award for outstanding achievement

- Will Smith

Best stand-up

- Stephen K. Amos

Best comedy performances

- Julia Morris

=== 2006 ===
Best stand-up

- Russell Brand

Best comedy performance

- Marcus Brigstocke

Outstanding achievement

- Robin Ince

Best newcomer

- Danielle Ward
