= Win Ben Stein's Money =

American television game show

- Genre: Game show
- Created by: Al Burton; Donnie Brainard; Byron Glore; Andrew J. Golder
- Directed by: Dennis Rosenblatt
- Presented by: Ben Stein; Jimmy Kimmel; Nancy Pimental; Sal Iacono
- Opening theme: Symphony No. 9: Ode to Joy by Ludwig van Beethoven
- Ending theme: Die Walküre: Ride of the Valkyries by Richard Wagner
- Country of origin: United States
- No. of seasons: 6
- No. of episodes: 119

Production
- Executive producer: Andrew J. Golder
- Running time: 30 minutes
- Production companies: Valleycrest Productions, Ltd. Comedy Central; Buena Vista Television

Original release
- Network: Comedy Central
- Release: July 28, 1997 – January 31, 2003

Win Ben Stein's Money is an American television game show created by Al Burton and Donnie Brainard that aired first-run episodes from July 28, 1997, to January 31, 2003, on Comedy Central. The show features three contestants who compete to answer general knowledge questions to win the grand prize of $5,000 from the show's host, Ben Stein. In the second half of each episode, Stein participates as a "common" contestant in order to defend his money from being taken by his competitors. The show won six Daytime Emmy awards, with Stein and Jimmy Kimmel, the show's original co-host, sharing the Outstanding Game Show Host award in 1999. The show was produced by Valleycrest Productions, Ltd. and distributed by Buena Vista Television, both subsidiaries of The Walt Disney Company.

As noted in the disclaimer during the closing credits, prize money won by contestants is paid from a prize budget furnished by the producers of the show. Any money left over in that budget at the end of a season is given to Stein. If the total amount paid out during a season exceeds that budget, the production company pays the excess. In this way, Stein is never in any danger of losing money from his own pocket.

Jimmy Kimmel co-hosted the series for the first three years. Kimmel left in 2000 to focus on The Man Show and was replaced by South Park's then staff writer Nancy Pimental, who co-hosted the program through March 2002. Kimmel's cousin Sal Iacono took over the role in April 2002 and stayed until the series ended in 2003. Kimmel made guest appearances and hosted College Week in 2001 and the final week of shows in March 2002.

== Game format ==
=== Round 1 ===
The game begins with three contestants and $5,000 in Stein's bank. Five categories are available for contestants to choose from, with pun-laden titles hinting at the questions' content. After a contestant chooses a category, its value is revealed ($50, $100, or $150) and Stein asks a toss-up question open to all three contestants. Higher-valued categories are more difficult. If a contestant rings in and answers correctly, the question value is added to their score and deducted from Stein's bank. An incorrect response carries no penalty but allows the other two contestants a chance to ring in. The contestant who answers the toss-up is then asked a follow-up question worth $50. If they cannot answer correctly, either of the other two can ring in and attempt to score. If no one rings in and answers the toss-up question correctly, the $50 follow-up question is asked as a toss-up as well. Once both questions have been asked, the category is removed from play and a new one substituted in its place, and the contestant who gave the last correct answer to that point chooses the next category.

The co-host warns the contestants when there are two minutes left in the round. Once time runs out, the lowest-scoring contestant is eliminated and their total is returned to Stein's bank. If there is a tie for low score, one last toss-up is asked; an incorrect response allows the opponent to advance by default.

As a running gag, Stein often pokes fun at rival quiz show Jeopardy!, given the similarities of formats between both shows. As such, any contestant who accidentally responds in the form of a question is made to wear a dunce cap for the rest of the round.

=== Round 2 ===
Stein replaces the eliminated contestant and turns over question-asking duties to the co-host, who always states that Stein has no advance knowledge of any questions that are used from that point forward. This round is played similarly to the first, with some rule changes. Stein chooses the first category to start the round, and the values are increased to $200–$500, in increments of $100. Each category consists of a single toss-up question, with no follow-up. If Stein answers correctly, his bank total remains unchanged; his podium (which is always on the far right) always displays a dollar sign instead of his total. The co-host announces a one-minute warning before the round ends. When time runs out, the lower-scoring contestant is eliminated, forfeiting all money won, which is returned to Stein's bank; in the event of a tie, a toss-up tiebreaker is asked, with Stein not participating. The higher-scoring contestant keeps all money won and advances to the bonus round for a chance to win the entire $5,000.

=== Bonus Round: Best of 10 Test of Knowledge ===
In the bonus round, the Best of 10 Test of Knowledge, both Stein and the winner of the second round are placed in isolation booths so that neither can hear the other's answers. The contestant has the choice of playing first or second. The person playing first is given 60 seconds to answer a total of 10 questions and can pass if he or she chooses to do so; however, questions which are passed or answered incorrectly cannot be returned to during the round. After the first person plays the round, the answers to the missed or passed questions are reviewed, and the other is given 60 seconds to answer the same 10 questions.

If the contestant answers more questions correctly than Stein, the contestant wins the entire $5,000 grand prize that Stein put into the bank at the beginning of the show. If Stein answers more questions correctly, the contestant keeps only the money won in the first two rounds. If the round ends in a tie, the contestant wins an additional $1,000; however, in the earliest episodes of the first season, the contestant wins the full $5,000 jackpot in the event of a tie.

The isolation booth for the contestant is plain, with a hardwood stool and a bare hanging light bulb. From season 3 to the end of the series, the contestant's booth has a large crack running down the wall. Stein's booth is more luxurious, with a leather wing-back chair and other lavish furnishings.

=== "Ben Stein's Cup" episodes ===
Near the end of the fourth season, six of the best contestants who previously won $5,000 return for a special "Ben Stein's Cup" episode, for a chance to win $25,000. In the first round, question values were $200, $400, and $600, with follow-up questions worth $200. In the second round, questions are worth $800–$2,000 in increments of $400. In both episodes, the winners attempt to defeat Stein for the entire $25,000. The first "Ben Stein's Cup" is co-hosted by Jimmy Kimmel, with the second co-hosted by Nancy Pimental.

== Music ==
Various pieces of classical music are used as the themes. The opening theme is the fourth movement of Beethoven's Ninth Symphony, Ode to Joy, which is repeated to begin the second round, and again if the champion wins the $5,000. The closing theme is Ride of the Valkyries, from Richard Wagner's The Valkyrie. Other classical music pieces used on the show include:

- Wachet auf, ruft uns die Stimme by Johann Sebastian Bach (at the beginning of the show when Stein introduces himself)
- Water Music by Georg Friedrich Händel (leading to first commercial break)
- Spring from The Four Seasons by Antonio Vivaldi (Coming out of the first commercial break)
- Eine kleine Nachtmusik by Wolfgang Amadeus Mozart (leading into the second commercial break)
- Trepak (a/k/a "The Russian Dance") from The Nutcracker by Pyotr Ilyich Tchaikovsky (used to segue to the final commercial break)
- Night on Bald Mountain by Modest Mussorgsky (coming out of the final commercial break and cuing to the final round)

== International versions ==
Country	Local title	Host	Network	Date premiered
Australia	Win Roy & H.G.'s Money	John Doyle and Greig Pickhaver	Seven Network	2000
Hungary	Hoztam egy milliót!	Tamás Vitray and Nóra Kovács	MTV1	2003
United Kingdom	Win Beadle's Money	Jeremy Beadle and Richard Morton	Channel 5	August 2, 1999 – December 22, 1999

=== United Kingdom ===
Win Beadle's Money was hosted by Jeremy Beadle and Richard Morton. It aired on Channel 5 from August 2 to December 22, 1999, and was produced by Grundy. The grand prize was £1,000.

=== Australia ===
Win Roy & H.G.'s Money, hosted by "Rampaging" Roy Slaven (John Doyle) and H.G. Nelson (Greig Pickhaver), aired on Seven Network for eight episodes in 2000. The grand prize was A$5,000.

=== Hungary ===
Hoztam egy milliót!, hosted by Tamás Vitray with Nóra Kovács, aired on Magyar Televízió in 2003. The grand prize was 1 000 000 HUF.

Preceded by Jeopardy!	Daytime Emmy Award for Outstanding Game/Audience Participation Show; 1999	Succeeded by Who Wants to Be a Millionaire
