= Pat Condell =

Stand-up comedian, writer, and Internet personality

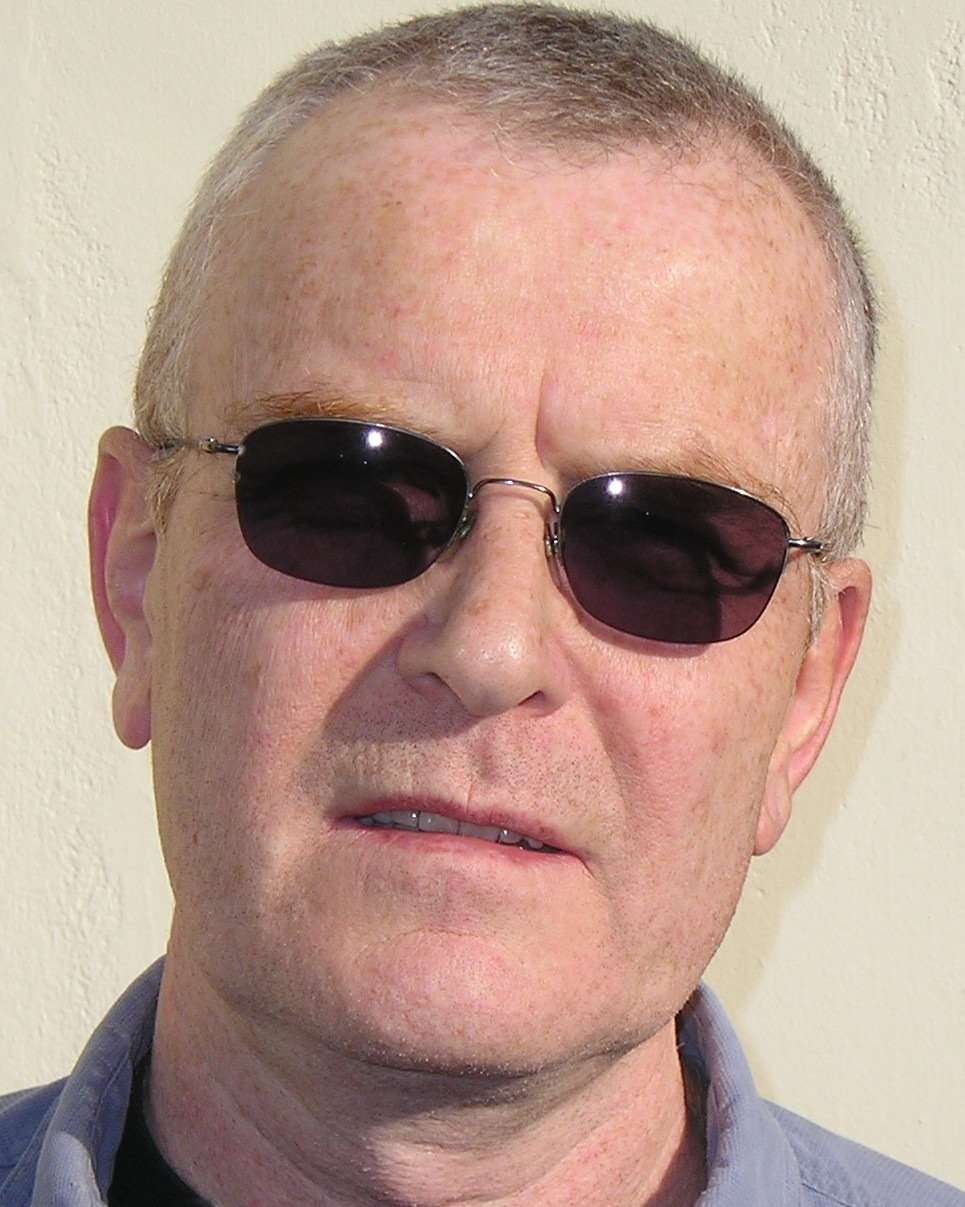
- Condell in 2006
- Born: Patrick Condell; 23 November 1949 (age 76)

Comedy career
- Years active: 1982–present
- Medium: Writer, comedian, stand up
- Genres: Topical comedy, religious and political satire
- Subjects: Atheism; free speech

YouTube information
- Channel: Pat Condell
- Years active: 2007–present
- Genres: Politics; commentary
- Subscribers: 337 thousand
- Views: 76.9 million
- Last updated: 25 April 2026
- Website: patcondell.net

Patrick Condell (born 23 November 1949) is a British writer, polemicist, and former stand-up comedian. In his early career, he wrote and performed in alternative comedy shows during the 1980s and 1990s in London, winning the Time Out Comedy Award in 1991. He was also a regular panelist on BBC Radio 1's Loose Talk programme.

In early 2007, Condell began uploading videos on the internet, consisting of monologue polemics primarily about religious authority, authoritarianism in government and left-wing politics, and notably criticism of Islam and the societal effects of Muslim immigration into Western Europe. His videos have also been published on DVD, and as a book of video transcripts.

== Early life ==
Condell was born to an Irish Catholic family, and was raised in England. His father was a compulsive gambler working in a betting shop until he was sent to prison for stealing money; he subsequently died of leukaemia. The Condell family in consequence was impoverished, moving repeatedly from home to home. Condell was educated in several different Church of England schools in South London, saying of this time, "I found myself segregated in assembly and shunted into another room while everyone said their morning prayers. The whole pantomime seemed hollow to me even then. Once you become aware of the gulf between what people profess to believe and how they actually behave, it's hard to take any of it seriously."

Condell left school at 16. His first job was as a dish-washer in the revolving restaurant on top of the Post Office Tower, now known as the BT Tower in London, for five shillings an hour. Condell did a number of jobs including working in a furniture warehouse, as a welder at the Ford Transit plant in Southampton, as an office clerk for a shipping company, volunteering on a kibbutz in Israel and then doing six years of logging in Canada.

== Comedy ==
After moving back to the United Kingdom from Canada, Condell performed alternative comedy shows during the 1980s and 1990s. His first performance on stage was at the age of 32 in a comedy sketch called Mountbatten's Plimsoll. He also wrote poetry and appeared in the Poetry Olympics at the Young Vic Theatre in 1982, which led to a job writing weekly poems for the Time Out magazine. Condell was described at the time as "a manic gimlet-eyed, crop-haired poet" in Drama: The Quarterly Theatre Review book. He performed at the Tunnel Club, next to the Blackwall Tunnel, where he describes the audience as a "nightmare;" bottles and glasses were thrown at him, and one person attempted to cut the microphone lead with a pair of garden shears. Condell was a performer at The Comedy Store in the Cutting Edge team, with whom he performed at the Edinburgh Fringe in 1991. That year Condell was the winner of a Time Out Comedy Award.

From 1991 to 1994 Condell was a regular panellist on BBC Radio 1's Loose Talk. During the mid-1990s, he was performing over 200 times a year. Due to the late nights and regular travelling he decided to start writing for other comedians, while still doing the occasional performance. Condell's 1996 play Barry Sorts It Out was given a negative review in the Financial Times, which described it as "a sordid East End comedy" which "repeats ad nauseam the same gag." The reviewer concluded that it is "a play with all the bite of a set of joke-shop fangs."

His 2006 stand-up show Faith Hope and Sanity, subtitled "A Few Jokes About Religion Before It Kills Us All," was a platform for his comedy and atheist beliefs. "This is the first time I've set out to write a show in order to say something, rather than just as a vehicle for stand-up" he said of the show. He performed the show at London's Etcetera Theatre. Chortle gave Condell's 2006 show a negative review, noting that Condell is covering familiar territory but "is not quite up to the job," and observing that Condell's material was delivered "with very little variation in pace or tone, ... with the feel of a lecture" and "no structure, no building up to a passionate, climactic conclusion, no ebb and flow of storytelling." Chortle concluded that "Condell is still going through the motions."

== Online videos and politics ==
Condell began posting videos online in 2007, with most of his YouTube videos chastising Islam and Western appeasement of Islam. His videos have caused Condell to receive hundreds of death threats but also a significant amount of support.

Condell has spoken favourably of Dutch politician Geert Wilders and has described the Qur'an as hate speech. Condell has thus been described as part of the counter-jihad movement.

Condell's first video, uploaded to YouTube on 8 February 2007, was his participation in The Blasphemy Challenge, an Internet-based project which aims to get atheists to declare themselves. The challenge asks atheists to submit videos to the website YouTube, in which they record themselves blaspheming or denying the existence of the Holy Spirit.

The book Raising Freethinkers: A Practical Guide for Parenting Beyond Belief, describes Condell as "breathtakingly intelligent, articulate, uncompromising, and funny". The New York Times Magazine described Condell as a "smug atheist".

=== Criticism of Islam ===
The Trouble with Islam

Condell received criticism after links to his monologue titled The Trouble with Islam were circulated to commissioners in the California city of Berkeley's Peace and Justice Commission. Condell said in the video that Islam is "a religion of war", that "Muslim women in Britain who cover their faces are mentally ill", though in some parts of the world women have no choice but to cover their face, as they are "governed...by primitive pigs whose only achievement in life is to be born with a penis in one hand and a Qur'an in the other". Commissioner Elliot Cohen described Condell's comments as "insulting, degenerating and racist". Condell then accused Cohen of being "motivated by his own narrow personal and political agenda which has nothing to do with [Condell] or the video clip". The video was initially sent to them by fellow Peace and Justice Commissioner Jonathan Wornick, who said it "tries to expose intolerance in the Muslim world", such as "the intolerance of radical Islamists who say if you insult Allah, you should have your head cut off". Condell said that its popularity proves "there is an enthusiastic audience for comedy ideas and opinions which are routinely censored out of existence in the UK's mainstream media, thanks to misguided political correctness".

Condell also opposed the development of Park51, a proposed Islamic centre and mosque near the site of the World Trade Center September 11 attacks, in lower Manhattan. On 4 June 2010, he released a video titled "No Mosque at Ground Zero", in which he said that it was representative of Islamic triumphalism and that the United States would soon be on the verge of Islamization and have its freedoms trimmed, as he said Western Europe has.

=== YouTube video removals ===
Condell's video Welcome to Saudi Britain was removed by YouTube early in October 2008, but reinstated shortly after. In it Condell criticises Britain's sanctioning of a Sharia court, and refers to the entire country of Saudi Arabia as "mentally ill" for its abuse of women. A YouTube spokesman said "YouTube has clear policies that prohibit inappropriate content on the site, such as pornography, gratuitous violence or hate speech.... If users repeatedly break these rules we disable their accounts." The National Secular Society was among the complainants to YouTube, saying "as usual, he (Condell) does not mince his words, but he is not saying anything that is untrue. His main thrust is one of outrage on behalf of those Muslim women who will suffer because they are forced to have their marital problems solved in a male-dominated Sharia court." Condell believed that it was removed due to a flagging campaign by Islamic activists. YouTube also briefly removed Condell's video Godless and Free but then restored it, emailing Condell and explaining that it had been removed erroneously.

== Works ==
Year	Name	Medium	Role	Notes / References
1991	Barf Bites Back!	Stand-up comedy	Actor	
1993	Jo Brand Through the Cakehole	Comedy	Writer	
1997	Barry Sorts It Out	Comedy	Writer	
1998	Stand and Deliver	Stand-up comedy	Writer	
2008	Pat Condell Anthology	Stand-up comedy	Writer/actor	An anthology of 35 of Condell's videos.
2010	Godless and Free	Self-published	Writer	Transcripts of 60 video monologues from between February 2007 and October 2009.
2012	Freedom Is My Religion	Self-published	Writer	Transcripts of his videos including a 32-page introduction.

== See also ==
- Criticism of Islamism
- Criticism of religion
- List of comedians
- New Atheism
- Social impact of YouTube
