= Twist in My Sobriety =

1988 single by Tanita Tikaram

Single by Tanita Tikaram

from the album Ancient Heart
- B-side: "Friends"; "The Kill in Your Heart"; "For All These Years"
- Released: 10 October 1988
- Genre: Sophisti-pop
- Length: 3:53
- Label: WEA
- Songwriter: Tanita Tikaram
- Producers: Peter Van Hooke; Rod Argent

Tanita Tikaram singles chronology
"Good Tradition" (1988)	"Twist in My Sobriety" (1988)	"Cathedral Song" (1989)

Music video
- "Twist in My Sobriety" on YouTube

"Twist in My Sobriety" is a song written and performed by British singer-songwriter Tanita Tikaram. Released as a single in October 1988 from her debut album, Ancient Heart (1988), it was Tikaram's biggest international success, reaching number two in Austria and West Germany, entering the top 10 in several other European countries, and peaking at number 22 on the UK Singles Chart. Its music video was directed by Gerard de Thame and filmed in Bolivia.

== Composition ==
Malcolm Messiter plays the oboe on the song, which is featured prominently on the song's chorus, as well as being used on instrumental solos throughout the song. The lyrics are written in three stanzas answered by the same refrain, with the refrain repeated twice at the end of the song. The refrain states: "Look my eyes are just holograms / Look your love has drawn red from my hands / From my hands you know you'll never be / More than twist in my sobriety". The first line of the song, "All God's children need travelling shoes", is the title of a book by writer and poet Maya Angelou.

Speaking about the somewhat obscure and enigmatic lyrics, Tikaram has offered different views on their meaning, but said it's mostly about the particular relationship with the world one feels when entering adulthood. "The song is really about not understanding – when you're 18, you've got a very particular emotional relationship with the world, you feel very isolated, and everybody else is so distant and cold. And I think I was singing about not feeling anything or not being moved by things around. I think this is a strong feeling when you're just after adolescence."

== Release and performance ==
Released as the second single from her debut album Ancient Heart, the song was edited for its single release, eliminating the last verse of the song. Despite heavy promotion, including two performances of the song on the BBC's Top of the Pops, the single was only a moderate hit in the UK, peaking at number 22, and is Tikaram's last top-40 hit in her home country.

The song was a bigger success when released in Europe, becoming a top-10 hit in several countries, including Ireland (number 10), France (number six), Norway (number six), West Germany (number two), and Austria (number two). The single was Tikaram's only chart hit on the US charts, peaking at number 25 on the Modern Rock Tracks chart.

== Critical reception ==
Graeme Kay from Smash Hits wrote, "However this "newie" is not in the slightest bit similar [to "Good Tradition"], for it's a moody, slow moving tale of emotional turmoil that Tanita rasps out to the sound of her gently plucked guitar. It probably won't be quite as big a hit as her last one, but I suspect we shall be hearing a lot more from Ms Tikaram in years to come." Jerry Smith of Music Week noted that Tikaram "follows up with the atmospheric reflective track from her Ancient Heart album ["Good Tradition"]", and thought it was likely to become "another hit".

In a review of the 1996 remix, DJ Freshy D of Smash Hits awarded five out of five stars, calling it a "downbeat, yet housey" and "thoughtful, yet completely bangin'" remix of "melancholic, completely un-dancey girl Tanita".

== Music video ==
The sepia-colored music video for "Twist in My Sobriety" was directed by Gerard de Thame and premiered in the autumn of 1988. Shot on location on the Altiplano Plateau in Bolivia, the video shows various residents of a destitute village interacting with each other amidst their daily struggles. Interspersed throughout these scenes are shots of Tanita Tikaram singing in a darkened room with only one light shining on her face.

== Remixes ==
In 1998, Tikaram issued another version of the song as a B-side to her single Stop Listening.

== Track listings ==
7-inch single
No.	Title	Length
1.	"Twist in My Sobriety" (edit)	3:53
2.	"Friends"	2:13

12-inch maxi
No.	Title	Length
1.	"Twist in My Sobriety" (full length version)	4:51
2.	"Friends"	2:13
3.	"For All These Years"	5:13

CD maxi and 10-inch maxi
No.	Title	Length
1.	"Twist in My Sobriety" (edit)	3:55
2.	"Friends"	2:16
3.	"The Kill in Your Heart"	3:43
4.	"For All These Years"	5:12

1996 remixes
No.	Title	Length
1.	"Twist in My Sobriety" (Tikaramp Radio)	4:23
2.	"Twist in My Sobriety" (Phil Kelsey Vocal)	9:40
3.	"Twist in My Sobriety" (Extended Bumps Fluidity Mix)	5:10
4.	"Twist in My Sobriety" (Tikaramp Vocal)	6:48
5.	"Twist in My Sobriety" (SFX Sobriety Mix)	6:55

== Charts ==
=== Weekly charts ===
Original version

Chart (1988–1989)	Peak position
Australia (ARIA)	23
Austria (Ö3 Austria Top 40)	2
Belgium (Ultratop 50 Flanders)	22
Canada Top Singles (RPM)	40
Europe (Eurochart Hot 100)	7
Finland (Suomen virallinen lista)	14
France (SNEP)	6
Ireland (IRMA)	10
Italy Airplay (Music & Media)	20
Luxembourg (Radio Luxembourg)	19
Netherlands (Dutch Top 40)	23
Netherlands (Single Top 100)	26
Norway (VG-lista)	6
Quebec (ADISQ)	9
Switzerland (Schweizer Hitparade)	6
UK Singles (Official Charts)	22
US Album Rock Tracks (Billboard)	47
US Modern Rock Tracks (Billboard)	25
West Germany (GfK)	2

1996 remix

Chart (1996)	Peak position
Iceland (Íslenski Listinn Topp 10)	9
Scottish Singles Sales (Official Charts)	82
UK Singles (Official Charts)	81
UK Dance (Official Charts)	19

=== Year-end charts ===
Chart (1989)	Position
Austria (Ö3 Austria Top 40)	10
Europe (Eurochart Hot 100)	37
Switzerland (Schweizer Hitparade)	21
West Germany (Media Control)	16

== Certifications ==
Region	Certification	Certified units/sales
France (SNEP)	Silver	200,000^{*}
Germany (BVMI)	Gold	250,000^{^}
^{*} Sales figures based on certification alone.^{^} Shipments figures based on certification alone.

== Legacy ==
In 1989, the song was covered by Liza Minnelli for her album Results (produced by Pet Shop Boys).

In 1996, a remixed house version by Ramp (Simon Rogers and Shem McCauley) with a much faster tempo was included on the compilation The Best of Tanita Tikaram and was released as a single to promote the album. The single peaked at number 82 in the UK. In 2001, the song appeared on the soundtrack of the film Bandits. The song has been covered by such artists as Diana Ankudinova from Russia.

In 2002, Austrian goth metal band Darkwell’s EP Conflict of Interest included a cover version of the song.

On 22 March 2023, the Norwegian symphonic metal band Sirenia released a performance video of their cover version of the song.

In 2025, Tikaram re-recorded the vocals for a version released by Kingston Sound System.

On 24 October 2025, a cover of the song by Paul Dempsey was included in the album Shotgun Karaoke Vol. II.
