= Win Beadle's Money =

British television series

- Genre: Game show
- Based on: Win Ben Stein's Money by: Al Burton; Donnie Brainard; Byron Glore; Andrew J. Golder
- Presented by: Jeremy Beadle
- Starring: Richard Morton
- Country of origin: United Kingdom
- Original language: English
- No. of series: 1
- No. of episodes: 52

Production
- Running time: 30 minutes (inc. adverts)
- Production company: Grundy

Original release
- Network: Channel 5
- Release: 2 August – 22 December 1999

Related
- Win Ben Stein's Money

Win Beadle's Money is a British game show based on the American game show Win Ben Stein's Money. It ran from 2 August to 22 December 1999 and hosted by Jeremy Beadle with Richard Morton as co-host. Richard Hearsey, who was Head of Worldwide Acquisitions & Development at Pearson Television saw Win Ben Stein's Money whilst he was in Los Angeles and set about acquiring it. He had a number of meetings with Ben Stein and the format owners.

Three players would be shown five categories, one of which would be chosen by a contestant. Whoever buzzed in and answered correctly earned the value of the question. Any cash scored by the players would be deducted from Beadle's bank which started at £1,000. In round one, question values ranged from £10 to £30. The player who answered correctly would answer a bonus question worth £10. After time expired, the player with the lowest score would be eliminated and forfeit any cash scored back into Beadle's bank.

The remaining two players competed against Beadle who would defend his remaining money while Richard Morton read the questions. Questions now ranged from £40 to £100 with no bonus questions. At the end of this round, the lower scoring player's score would return to Beadle's bank. Only the winning player kept his or her winnings.

In the final round, the winning player and Beadle would each be seated in a separate soundproof booth. Each person would be given 60 seconds to answer the same ten questions read by Morton. If Beadle answered more questions correctly, the other player kept his or her winnings from earlier. If both people provided the same number of correct answers, Beadle's opponent earned £200 extra. If Beadle's opponent provided more correct answers, he or she won all of Beadle's £1,000.
