= Adam Bloom =

British comedian and writer

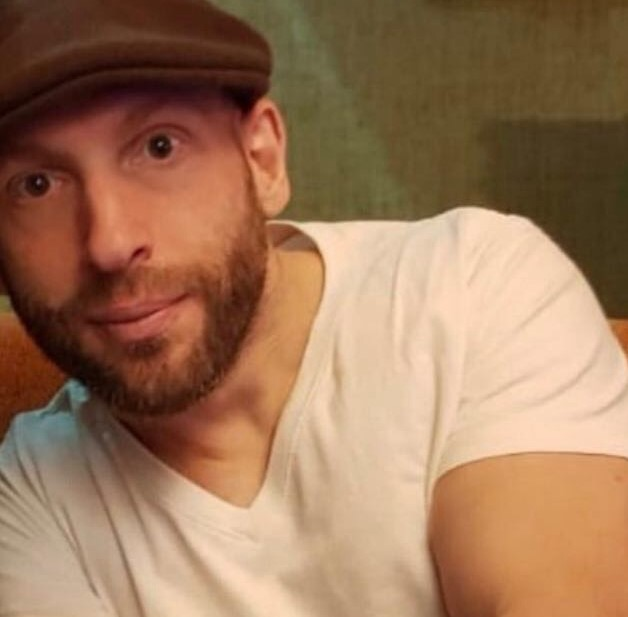
- Born: 8 December 1970 (age 54); Richmond-upon-Thames, England
- Occupation(s): Comedian, writer, author
- Years active: 1993–present

Adam Bloom (born 8 December 1970) is a British comedian and writer. He has played The Edinburgh Festival for many years, once winning The Edinburgh Festival Polygram Punter Comedy Award. In 1998 he won The Time Out Comedy Award for Best Stand-Up. He appeared at The Melbourne International Comedy Festival 1999 and 2000, winning a Stella Artois award for the former appearance.

== Radio and television appearances ==
Bloom was a guest on RMITV's The Loft Live Episode 12 of Season 8 13 April 2000 broadcast on Channel 31 Melbourne.

He has also appeared on Mock the Week, Never Mind the Buzzcocks, Russell Howard's Good News and The Young Person's Guide To Becoming a Rockstar.

Bloom wrote and starred in the BBC Radio 4 show The Problem with Adam Bloom, which ran for three series (2003–2005).

In 1999 Channel 4 commissioned Beyond a Joke, Bloom's own half-hour special, a mockumentary about a comedian's life off-stage.

== Notable works ==
Bloom performed at the Just For Laughs comedy festival in Montreal in 1998, 2001, 2005 and 2013, recording television galas in 2001 and 2005 which were broadcast in several countries. He was part of the 2004 Just For Laughs tour, performing to 42,000 people in 17 cities across Canada.

On 11 September 2015 he performed at the comedy stage at Banksy's Dismaland, the art exhibition in Weston-super-Mare.

Bloom self-published a guide book on stand-up comedy, Finding Your Comic Genius: An in-depth guide to the art of stand-up comedy in 2023.
