= Just a Minute =

British radio panel game (since 1967)

- Nicholas Parsons hosted the show for almost 52 years
- Genre: Panel game
- Running time: 30 minutes
- Country of origin: United Kingdom
- Language: English
- Home station: BBC Radio 4
- Syndicates: BBC World Service; BBC Radio 4 Extra
- Hosted by: Nicholas Parsons (1967–2019); See list of guest presenters; Sue Perkins (2021–present)
- Starring: Clement Freud; Peter Jones; Derek Nimmo; Kenneth Williams; Paul Merton; See list of guest panellists
- Created by: Ian Messiter
- Produced by: See list of producers
- Recording studio: BBC Radio Theatre
- Remote studios: Various, including the Edinburgh Festival Fringe
- Original release: 22 December 1967 – present
- No. of series: 97 (as of July 2026)
- No. of episodes: 1031
- Opening theme: The Minute Waltz by Frédéric Chopin
- Website: www.bbc.co.uk/programmes/b006s5dp

Just a Minute is a BBC Radio 4 radio comedy panel game. For more than 50 years, with few exceptions, it was hosted by Nicholas Parsons. Following Parsons' death in 2020, Sue Perkins became the permanent host, starting with the 87th series. Just a Minute was first transmitted on Radio 4 on 22 December 1967, three months after the station's launch. The programme won a Gold Sony Radio Academy Award in 2003.

The object of the game is for panellists to talk for sixty seconds on a given subject, "without hesitation, repetition or deviation". The comedy comes from attempts to keep within these rules and the banter among the participants. In 2011, comedy writer David Quantick ascribed Just a Minute's success to its "insanely basic" format, stating, "It's so blank that it can be filled by people as diverse as Paul Merton and Graham Norton, who don't have to adapt their style of humour to the show at all."

Throughout its sixty year history, the show has, in addition to its popularity in the UK, developed an international following through its broadcast on the BBC World Service and, more recently, on the internet. The format has also occasionally been adapted for television.

== History ==
The idea for the game came to Ian Messiter as he rode on the top of a number 13 bus. He recalled Percival Parry Jones, a history master from his days at Sherborne School who, upon seeing the young Messiter daydreaming in a class, instructed him to repeat everything he had said in the previous minute without hesitation or repetition. To this, Messiter added a rule disallowing players from deviating from the subject, as well as a scoring system based on panellists' challenges.

The format was first used in One Minute, Please, chaired by Roy Plomley, two series of which were broadcast on the BBC Light Programme between 1951 and 1957. Whilst the fundamental rules were the same, the game was played in two teams of three rather than with four individual contestants. Other early incarnations of the show, all created by Messiter, include a 1952 version on South African radio, and a television version on the DuMont network in the United States: One Minute Please.

The pilot for Just a Minute was recorded in 1967, featuring Clement Freud, Derek Nimmo, Beryl Reid and Willma Ewert as panellists. The chairman was originally intended to be Jimmy Edwards but he was unavailable on Sundays, the proposed recording dates, as he liked to keep them free to play polo, and was replaced by Nicholas Parsons, who was originally supposed to be a panel member. Parsons did not want the job and only reluctantly took it, just for the pilot episode. After the show settled in, again he found himself in the role of a straight man for the panellists. Although executives at the BBC disliked the pilot, its producer, David Hatch, insisted on having Parsons as the chairman. The first series was not very successful, but Hatch threatened to resign if the programme was not given another chance. Not wishing to lose Hatch, the BBC acquiesced.

The show's theme music is Frédéric Chopin's piano Waltz in D flat major, Op. 64, No. 1, nicknamed the "Minute Waltz" (which, despite its name, lasts longer than 60 seconds; the nickname actually refers to "minute" as in "small" rather than the unit of time), leading to Parsons’ famous line: “As the Minute Waltz fades away..” The recording used for the theme is by David Haines.

Just a Minute was included in a planned BBC Wartime Emergency Service to be broadcast following a nuclear attack. The show was later dropped from the plans in the 1980s, along with all other light programming, in order to conserve power.

In 2018, Nicholas Parsons was unable to attend the recording of two editions of the programme as he had the flu. This broke his uninterrupted run of fifty years as a performer on the programme. The episodes were recorded on 1 April 2018 with Gyles Brandreth standing in for Parsons and were broadcast on 4 and 11 June 2018. He was also not present for a recording session for two episodes in series 85; episodes 942 and 943 were broadcast on 9 and 26 August 2019. Brandreth again covered for Parsons. Just a Minute continued to be transmitted with Parsons as host until his last show on 23 September 2019.

Repeats were then broadcast until Parsons' death on 28 January 2020, at the age of 96, and for a few months thereafter as a homage.

Series 86 began transmission in February 2021, with a number of guest panellists from the show's history being asked back to host an episode each.

== Rules ==
The panellists are invited, in rotation, to speak for one minute on a given subject (which they are normally not informed of in advance), without "hesitation, repetition or deviation". Over the years, the application of these rules has been inconsistent, and their interpretation is the focus of much of the comic interplay between those appearing, who often challenge the chairman's rulings.

In the early years the rules were more complicated, as special rules were sometimes tried out in addition, on a one-off basis: a ban on the word "is" might apply in a round, for example, or "the". But the three basic rules have always applied:

- "Hesitation" is watched very strictly: a momentary pause in speaking can give rise to a successful challenge, as can tripping over one's words. Even pausing during audience laughter or applause (known as "riding a laugh") can be challenged.
- "Repetition" means the repetition of any word or phrase again and again, although challenges based upon very common words such as "and" are generally rejected except in extreme cases. Words contained in the given subject are now exempt unless repeated many times in quick succession, although this was a later addition to the rules. Skilful players use synonyms to avoid repeating themselves. Even letters may not be repeated; for example, the term "BBC" must be avoided, as it can be successfully challenged for repetition of "B".
- "Deviation" originally meant deviating from the given subject, but gradually evolved to also include "deviating from the English language as we know it", "deviation from grammar as we understand it", deviating from the truth, discussions of social deviance, and deviating from logic. Nevertheless, leaps into the surreal are usually allowed.

A panellist scores one point for making a correct challenge against whoever is speaking, or the speaker gets a point if the challenge is deemed incorrect. If a witty interjection amuses the audience, but is not a correct challenge, at the chairperson's discretion the challenger can nevertheless be awarded an extra point (the "bonus point" rule). A player who makes a correct challenge takes over the subject for the remainder of the minute, or until he or she is successfully challenged. At the discretion of the chairperson also, a challenged player can be given a "benefit of the doubt" and keeps the subject if what he or she was saying appears to remain within the rules, even if verging on their very limits. The person speaking when the whistle blows after 60 seconds scores a point. An extra point is awarded if a panellist speaks for the entire minute without being challenged.

It is rare for a panellist to speak within the three cardinal rules for any substantial length of time, whilst both remaining coherent and being amusing. Therefore, to speak for the full minute without being challenged is a special achievement. However, if a panellist is speaking fluently on a subject, staying reasonably within the three rules, and seems likely to speak for the whole minute, the other panellists often refrain from challenging. On occasion a similar courtesy has been extended by the whistle-blower, who will refrain from indicating the end of the minute so as to not interrupt a panellist in full and entertaining flow (this once led to Paul Merton speaking for one minute and thirty seconds on the topic "Ram-raiding"). There have also been occasions when players have chosen not to buzz because the speaker has been amusing the audience by performing badly.

Here is an example of a speech which successfully lasted for a full minute without being challenged.

Well it varies according to the person that you are arguing with. Should it be a child that you are having a contretemps with, the ideal is deviation tactics. For instance Lola Lupin who I mentioned before won't eat her dinner. So what I do is say, "Yes it is rotten food, let us sing a song", making sure that that particular chanson has a few vowels in it that require her to open her mouth! During which I pop the spoon in and I have won the argument. However if it is an argument with a person that knows their subject what I do is nod sagely and smile superciliously, let them ramble on, and at the end I say "Well I'm sorry, I think you're completely wrong", turn on my heels and leave. I ...

— Sheila Hancock, on the subject of 'How to win an argument'.

On rare occasions, panellists will challenge themselves, usually by mistake or for laughs. If successful, last-second challenges can be especially rewarding, as they allow one to speak for a short time but earn two points—one for the challenge and one for being the last speaker.

The game is then scored and a winner declared, but the attraction of the show lies less in the contest than in the humour and banter among participants and the chairman.

== Participants ==
Clement Freud was a panellist on the show from 1967 to 2009, making him the longest-serving contestant.

Each programme features four panellists, with the exception of six shows in 1968 and another at the end of the 1970–1971 season when there were only three.

Ian Messiter, the show's creator, set the subjects for every show until his death in 1999. Until 1989 he also sat on the stage with a stopwatch and blew a whistle when the sixty seconds were up. He has been replaced by a succession of different whistle-blowers, a role which now falls to the production assistant.

There have been five regular competitors in the show's history:

- Clement Freud MP (1967–2009)
- Derek Nimmo (1967–1999)
- Kenneth Williams (1968–1988)
- Peter Jones (1971–2000)
- Paul Merton (1989–present)

Freud and Nimmo appeared from the first programme in 1967, while Williams joined in the show's second series in 1968. Jones made his début in 1971. After Williams' death in 1988, Merton (a long-time fan of the show) contacted the producer at Nicholas Parsons' suggestion and was invited to participate during the following year. Nimmo died in 1999, Jones in 2000 and Freud in 2009, leaving Merton as the only regular, although he is not in every episode.

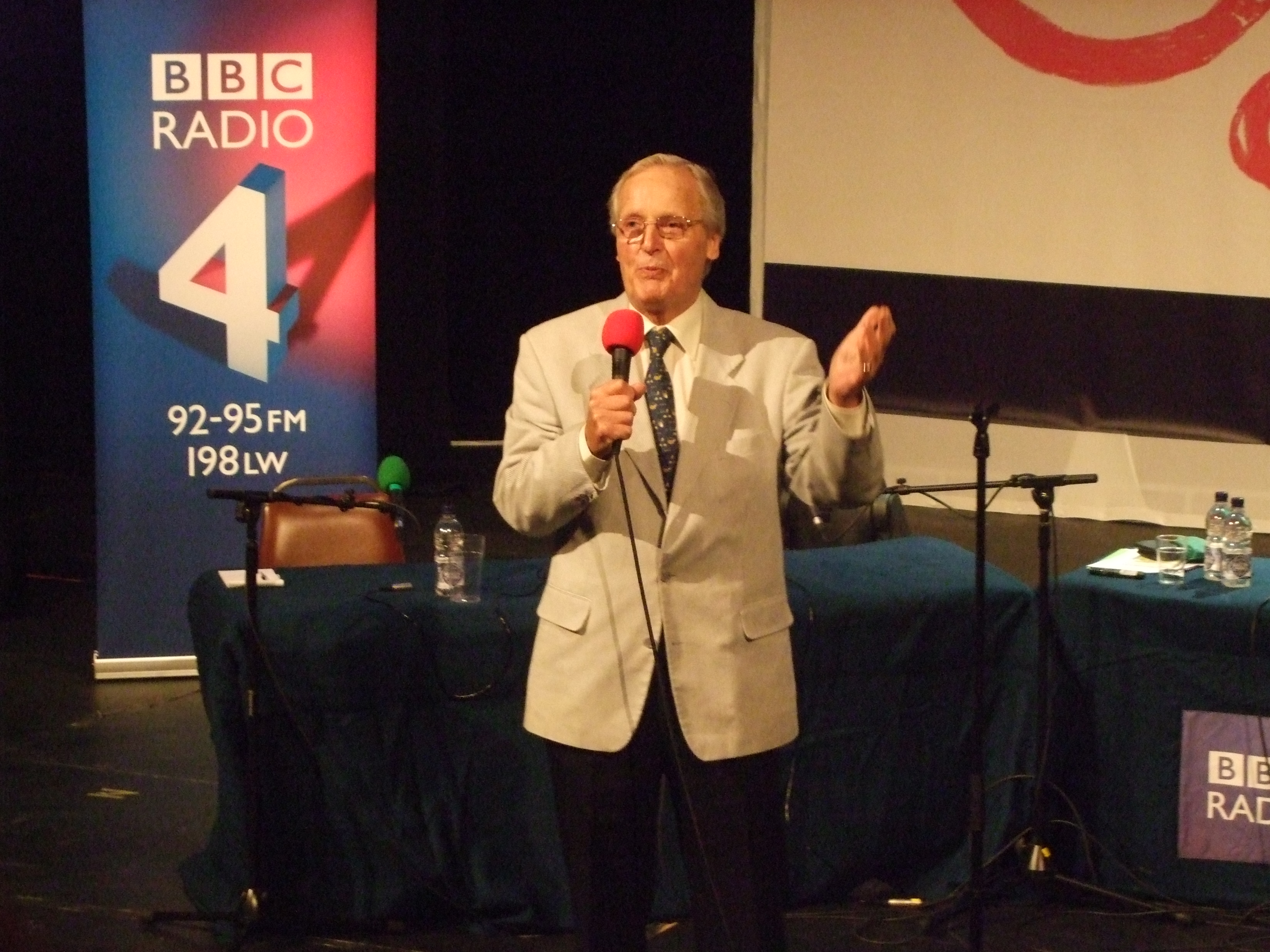
Nicholas Parsons during a recording at the Pleasance, Edinburgh in 2007.

Each of the regulars brought their individual style to playing the game. Clement Freud liked to make lists and to challenge with only a few seconds to go. He was among the show's more competitive players, Brandreth recalling that Freud once intentionally spilt water on him while he was talking, regularly referring to the rules and deprecating any deviation from them. Derek Nimmo often improvised descriptions of his experiences abroad, many derived from his extensive theatrical tours. He too was highly competitive, and was known for berating the chairman frequently. Peter Jones once said that in all his years playing the game, he never quite got the hang of it; nonetheless, his self-deprecating, laconic style suited the essential silliness of the show. Kenneth Williams was often the star of the show: his flamboyant tantrums, arch put-downs, and mock sycophancy made him the audience's favourite. Williams often stretched out his speeches by extending every syllable to breaking point (some words lasting for up to three seconds), and his outbursts of mock-anger regularly included his catchphrase "I've come all the way from Great Portland Street", as though he had journeyed for miles, when in fact his home was just around the corner from the BBC studios where most recordings took place. Merton frequently launches into surreal flights of fancy and fantasy, such as claiming to have had unusual occupations or to have experienced significant historical events. He also often wins points by challenging just before the whistle or for humorous challenges, another technique being to say the same word in the singular and the plural, for inexperienced panellists to challenge incorrectly.

== Guest panellists ==
Over the 50-year history of the show, there have been many other panellists. Those appearing more than 20 times include:

- Pam Ayres
- Jo Brand
- Gyles Brandreth
- Marcus Brigstocke
- Julian Clary
- Alun Cochrane
- Charles Collingwood
- Barry Cryer
- Jenny Eclair
- Stephen Fry
- Sheila Hancock
- Tony Hawks
- Kit Hesketh-Harvey
- Josie Lawrence
- Aimi MacDonald
- Andree Melly
- Chris Neill
- Ross Noble
- Graham Norton
- Sue Perkins
- Tim Rice
- Wendy Richard
- Linda Smith
- Liza Tarbuck

Others appearing as panellists on the Radio and TV programme include:

- James Acaster
- Jayde Adams
- Chris Addison
- Eshaan Akbar
- Ray Alan
- Tom Allen
- Stephen K. Amos
- Toni Arthur
- Bill Bailey
- Joan Bakewell
- Clare Balding
- Tony Banks
- Dane Baptiste
- Angela Barnes
- Isobel Barnett
- Simon Bates
- Jeremy Beadle
- Lucy Beaumont
- Elisabeth Beresford
- Teddie Beverley
- John Bishop
- Tony Blackburn
- Isla Blair
- Barbara Blake Hannah
- Henry Blofeld
- Hugh Bonneville
- Fern Britton
- Cyrus Broacha
- Tim Brooke-Taylor
- Janet Brown
- Ken Bruce
- Rob Brydon
- Ed Byrne
- Ann Bryson
- Rob Buckman
- Desiree Burch
- Hannibal Buress
- Jason Byrne
- Susan Calman
- Ian Carmichael
- Michael Cashman
- Barbara Castle
- Jo Caulfield
- Daliso Chaponda
- Craig Charles
- Lorraine Chase
- Denise Coffey
- Peter Cook
- Charles Collingwood
- Bernard Cribbins
- Alan Davies
- Jack Dee
- Hugh Dennis
- Blythe Duff
- Kevin Eldon
- Pippa Evans
- Kenny Everett
- Vanessa Feltz
- Craig Ferguson
- Lynn Ferguson
- Fenella Fielding
- John Finnemore
- John Fortune
- William Franklyn
- Liz Fraser
- Emma Freud
- Rebecca Front
- Stephen Frost
- Graeme Garden
- Rhod Gilbert
- Annabel Giles
- Fi Glover
- Liza Goddard
- Janey Godley
- Kerry Godliman
- Dave Gorman
- Ivo Graham
- Andy Hamilton
- Jeremy Hardy
- Diane Hart
- Hattie Hayridge
- Richard Herring
- Thora Hird
- Ian Hislop
- Rufus Hound
- Renée Houston
- Robin Ince
- Eddie Izzard
- David Jacobs
- Rhys James
- Martin Jarvis
- Brian Johnston
- Ruth Jones
- John Junkin
- Phill Jupitus
- Miles Jupp
- Miriam Karlin
- Russell Kane
- Gerry Kelly
- Henry Kelly
- Shappi Khorsandi
- Patrick Kielty
- Miles Kington
- Nish Kumar
- Bettine Le Beau
- Helen Lederer
- Ria Lina
- Maureen Lipman
- Moira Lister
- Cariad Lloyd
- Sean Lock
- Josie Long
- Joe Lycett
- Zoe Lyons
- Fred MacAulay
- Lee Mack
- Jacqueline MacKenzie
- Jason Manford
- Stephen Mangan
- Miriam Margolyes
- Alfred Marks
- Betty Marsden
- Jean Marsh
- Anna Maxwell Martin
- Pete McCarthy
- Maria McErlane
- Alistair McGowan
- Pauline McLynn
- Ian McMillan
- Mike McShane
- Andrée Melly
- Ian Messiter
- Shazia Mirza
- David Mitchell
- Warren Mitchell
- Bob Monkhouse
- Patrick Moore
- Justin Moorhouse
- Richard Morton
- Neil Mullarkey
- Jimmy Mulville
- Richard Murdoch
- Al Murray
- Chris Neill
- Dara Ó Briain
- Owen O'Neill
- Anuvab Pal
- Michael Palin
- Rachel Parris
- Nicholas Parsons
- Sara Pascoe
- Lance Percival
- Su Pollard
- Lucy Porter
- Kiri Pritchard-McLean
- Greg Proops
- Marjorie Proops
- Steve Punt
- Libby Purves
- Magnus Pyke
- Caroline Quentin
- Esther Rantzen
- Jan Ravens
- Heidi Regan
- Beryl Reid
- Nick Revell
- Anneka Rice
- Kate Robbins
- Kenneth Robinson
- Jonathan Ross
- Suzi Ruffell
- Willie Rushton
- Katherine Ryan
- Jennifer Saunders
- Alexei Sayle
- Prunella Scales
- Will Self
- John Sergeant
- Lee Simpson
- Paul Sinha
- Frank Skinner
- Tony Slattery
- Millie Small
- Arthur Smith
- Victor Spinetti
- Richard Stilgoe
- Elaine Stritch
- Una Stubbs
- Eleanor Summerfield
- Jim Sweeney
- David Tennant
- Christopher Timothy
- Sandi Toksvig
- Barry Took
- Russell Tovey
- Tommy Trinder
- Joan Turner
- Stanley Unwin
- Tim Vine
- Richard Vranch
- Rick Wakeman
- Roy Walker
- David Walliams Comic Relief Special 2011
- Holly Walsh
- Phil Wang
- Felicity Ward
- Mark Watson
- Katharine Whitehorn
- June Whitfield
- Josh Widdicombe
- Simon Williams
- Anona Winn
- Dale Winton
- Terry Wogan
- Michael Wood
- Victoria Wood

== Guest presenters ==
Nicholas Parsons chaired the show from its inception until 2019. On nine occasions he appeared on the panel, and others have acted as chairman including Clement Freud, Geraldine Jones, Andrée Melly "as our contribution to the women's liberation movement", and Kenneth Williams. Ian Messiter was chairman on one occasion in 1977, when Freud arrived late and Parsons took his place on the panel.

Parsons appeared on every show for 51 years, either as chairman or panellist, until he was absent through illness for two episodes recorded in April 2018 and broadcast the following June. Those shows were hosted by Gyles Brandreth, as were two episodes recorded and broadcast in August 2019, when Parsons was again unwell.

Following Parsons' death on 28 January 2020, the BBC started broadcasting new episodes in 2021 with guest hosts including Gyles Brandreth, Paul Merton, Stephen Fry, Jo Brand, Nish Kumar, Julian Clary, Lucy Porter, Sue Perkins, Tom Allen and Jenny Eclair, before Perkins was announced as permanent host in 2021.

== Producers ==
Over the years, more than two dozen producers have worked on Just a Minute.

- David Hatch (1967–1975 & 1979–1981)
- Simon Brett (1969–1975)
- John Cassells (1973)
- Bob Oliver Rogers (1973–1974)
- John Lloyd (1974–1976)
- John Browell (1976–1978)
- Pete Atkin (1982–1986)
- Edward Taylor (1987–1991)
- Sarah Smith (1992–1995)
- Anne Jobson (1994–1998)
- Chris Neill (1998–2000 & 2004)
- Claire Jones (2001–2006 & 2008–2012)
- Tilusha Ghelani (2007–2008 & 2010–2015)
- Katie Tyrrell (2013–2015)
- Victoria Lloyd (2015–2016 & 2017–2019)
- Matt Stronge (2016–2019)
- Richard Morris (2018–2019)
- Alex Smith (2019)
- Hayley Sterling (2021)

== Announcers ==
- Sheila Tracy

== TV version ==
- Helena Taylor (1995)
- Mike Mansfield (1995)
- Andrew Brereton (2012)
- Tilusha Ghelani (2012)
- Malcolm Messiter (2012)
- Jamie Ormerod (2012)
- Jo Street (2012)

== Recording locations ==
The first show in 1967 was recorded in the Playhouse Theatre in central London, and the 35th anniversary show was also recorded there, and broadcast on New Year's Day 2003.

For the first 30 years, most shows were recorded in the Paris Theatre in central London. In 1992, a new producer, Sarah Smith, took the show outside central London and recorded some shows in nearby Highgate. A year later, the show left London for the first time; the first shows to be made outside London were recorded in Bury St Edmunds and Llandudno. The show started going to the Edinburgh Festival Fringe in 1993 and has been there every year since. In recent years most shows, though not all, have been recorded at the BBC Radio Theatre in Broadcasting House in central London.

In February 2012, two episodes of the show were recorded at the Comedy Store in Mumbai in India, the first time the show has recorded outside Britain. The programme played for many years on the BBC World Service and is said to have a very large following in India.

== TV versions ==
Several television versions have been attempted. Two pilot episodes were recorded for television in 1969 and 1981 but never broadcast, except in documentaries about Kenneth Williams.

In 1994, 14 shows were broadcast on Carlton Television, ITV in London. Two additional variations were added: a round in which the team were presented with a mystery object to talk about, rather than a subject, and another round where the audience suggested a topic. Nicholas Parsons chaired the show, and Tony Slattery featured in all programmes. Other panellists were Tony Banks, Tony Blackburn, Jo Brand, Ann Bryson, John Fortune, Clement Freud, Mariella Frostrup, Jeremy Hardy, Tony Hawks, Hattie Hayridge, Kit Hesketh-Harvey, Helen Lederer, Pete McCarthy, Neil Mullarkey, Derek Nimmo, Graham Norton, Nick Revell, Ted Robbins, Lee Simpson, Arthur Smith, Jim Sweeney and Richard Vranch.

In 1995, fourteen more episodes were broadcast. Just a Minute became a team game, with the Midlands and London playing against each other, under team captains Tony Slattery and Dale Winton. Each player earned individual points, which were totalled for each team at the end of the show. Nicholas Parsons again chaired the shows. The gimmick of the audience choosing a subject was abandoned in this series. Other panellists were Tony Banks, Tony Blackburn, Craig Charles, Clement Freud, Mariella Frostrup, Liza Goddard, Jeremy Hardy, Kit Hesketh-Harvey, Helen Lederer, Carolyn Marshall, Graham Norton, Su Pollard, Wendy Richard, Arthur Smith, Jim Sweeney and Richard Vranch. Both this series and the series before were produced by Mike Mansfield.

In 1999, the BBC televised the show, with 20 episodes recorded during a single week in Birmingham. Nicholas Parsons was again the chairman. There were no regular panellists but those appearing were Pam Ayres, Clare Balding, Isla Blair, Jo Brand, Gyles Brandreth, Ken Bruce, Michael Cashman, Barry Cryer, Stephen Frost, Liza Goddard, Tony Hawks, Peter Jones, Maria McErlane, Richard Morton, Tom O'Connor, Su Pollard, Steve Punt, Wendy Richard, John Sergeant, Brian Sewell, Linda Smith, Richard Vranch and Gary Wilmot. The series was produced by Helena Taylor.

In March and April 2012, the BBC broadcast ten episodes, recorded over a week at the BBC Television Centre in London, to mark the 45th anniversary of the programme. For the first time, the shows were shown in prime time at 6 pm each night over two weeks on BBC Two. Nicholas Parsons again chaired the programme and Paul Merton appeared in all episodes. Other panellists were Gyles Brandreth, Hugh Bonneville, Marcus Brigstocke, Julian Clary, Stephen Fry, Tony Hawks, Ruth Jones, Phill Jupitus, Miles Jupp, Shaparak Khorsandi, Josie Lawrence, Jason Manford, Stephen Mangan, Graham Norton, Sue Perkins, John Sergeant, Liza Tarbuck and Russell Tovey. No changes were made to the format of the game. The shows were produced by Andy Brereton and Jamie Ormerod.

== Audiobook releases ==
For the show's 25th anniversary in 1992, a two-hour compilation album entitled Just A Minute: Silver Minutes was released on long-play vinyl and cassette. The following year, an eponymous album Just A Minute was released containing three then-recent episodes from 1991 and 1993. A further cassette with four recent episodes entitled Just A Minute 2 followed in 1996. Just A Minute 3 in 1999 saw the start of regular annual releases featuring 4 of the best episodes from the previous year. After Just A Minute 8 in 2004, the following year's release was titled Just A Minute: The Best Of 2005 and an end-of-year collection has been released every year since with Just A Minute: The Best Of 2017 due for release on 2 November.

In 2004, the BBC began a separate annual series of double CD releases collecting older episodes covering the shows first 30 years entitled Just A Classic Minute: Volume 1. Each episode had a newly-recorded introduction by Parsons (for later volumes, Parsons and Merton in discussion). The first four volumes were also released in a box set entitled Just A Classic Minute: 40th Anniversary Collection in 2007. The series finished in 2010 with the release of Just A Classic Minute: Volume 7.

In 2010, Just A Minute: Series 56 became the first series to be made available in its entirety for purchase via digital download. This continued up to Just A Minute: Series 67. The pattern resumed for Just A Minute: Series 71 onwards, with complete series also made available on Compact Disc.

In 2011, five double CDs were released with each volume focusing on a "Classic" selection of each of the main regular panellists (eg. Just A Minute: Classic Kenneth Williams, Just A Minute: Classic Paul Merton, etc.) The five volumes were also available as a box set entitled Just A Minute: The Classic Collection along with a bonus CD. The "Classic Clement Freud" CD and audio download was withdrawn from sites such as Amazon and iTunes following the posthumous revelations about him. A second box set was released in 2014 entitled Just A Minute: Another Classic Collection. It followed the same theme as its predecessor, this time focusing on five non-regulars who are frequent panellists, namely Sheila Hancock, Gyles Brandreth, Jenny Éclair, Stephen Fry and Graham Norton. Once again, there was a bonus disc with the box set which was not available with the separate volumes. In 2015, a third box set entitled Just A Minute: A Further Classic Collection focused on Tim Rice, Wendy Richard, Tony Hawks, Sue Perkins and Julian Clary.

In 2017, a box set entitled Just A Minute: Golden Collection was released to celebrate the show's 50th anniversary. Controversially, more than half the selected episodes featured Freud despite the revelations about him in the previous year.

== Other formats ==
In Sweden, a version of the show, called På Minuten (Swedish for 'In the Minute'), has been broadcast on Sveriges Radio P1 since 1969. In India, a Malayalam version, known as ഒരു നിമിഷം, Oru Nimiṣaṁ, '(Just a Moment)', has been broadcast since 2017 on Flowers TV, hosted by Sreekandan Nair; the programme was previously broadcast on Asianet, Dooradarshan and Malayalam radio station Akashavani. In Belgium a Flemish version, called Zeg eens euh!, was broadcast from 1992 to 1997 on Één, and was revived in 2016 on Vier.

I'm Sorry I Haven't a Clue, another BBC radio comedy panel show which occupies the same Monday-night slot in the Radio 4 schedule, occasionally parodies its rival show with a round entitled "Just a Minim". In this spoof version the contestants must sing songs — always chosen for their highly repetitive lyrics — without repetition, hesitation, or deviation (from the tune). The chairman, currently Jack Dee who has himself been a guest on Just a Minute, imitates Nicholas Parsons' style.
