= Clement Doesn't Live Here Anymore =

British radio comedy series

- Genre: Sitcom
- Running time: 30 minutes
- Country of origin: United Kingdom
- Language(s): English
- Home station: BBC Radio 4
- Written by: Marc Haynes; Chris Heath
- Produced by: Chris Neill
- Executive producer(s): Seb Barwell
- Original release: 9 November 2005 – 18 June 2007
- No. of series: 2
- No. of episodes: 12

Clement Doesn't Live Here Anymore is a British radio comedy series that aired on BBC Radio 4 for two series between November 2005 and June 2007.

The theme tune for the show is "There's A Ghost in My House" by R. Dean Taylor.

== Summary ==
Clement never achieved much in life, but he always assumed death would be an end to the misery. When he returns as a ghost, still overweight yet even more anonymous, he discovers a whole new world of humiliation.

== Main cast ==
- Clement: Richard Ridings
- Andrew: Steve Furst
- Georgia: Amanda Abbington

== Series 1 (2005) ==
1. 9 November: "The Phantom Menace"
2. 16 November: "The Ghost Writer"
3. 23 November: "One Wedding and a Funeral"
4. 30 November: "The Nearly Departed"
5. 7 December: "Chanelling the Dead"
6. 14 December: "Goodbye Mr Clement"

Written by Marc Haynes and Chris Heath, the sitcom features Clement, an overweight, sexually liberated ghost who haunts the house in which he died – now inhabited by an upwardly mobile couple, Andrew and Georgia Dowie, with whom he shares living space, leisure time and far too much information about personal hygiene. Guests in the first series included TV presenter Richard Bacon, Sharon Horgan and Barry Cryer, who provided the voice of God.

== Series 2 (2007) ==
Series 2 was recorded at The Drill Hall in London between January and February 2007. The series was broadcast on BBC Radio 4 on Mondays at 11.30am from 14 May 2007. It was the Radio Choice of the day in The Times on the first day of broadcast.

1. 14 May: "Truly Madly Deeply Unacceptable" (guest starring Roger Sloman as Sandy the racist)
2. 21 May: "9½ Squeaks"
3. 28 May: "Georgia on My Mind"
4. 4 June: "Whoo-hoo Do You Think You Are?"
5. 11 June: "ASBO-lutely Fabulous" (guest starring Melanie Hudson)
6. 18 June: "Love Is Dead" (guest starring Geoffrey Whitehead and Julia Foster)
