= World Outside Your Window =

Single by Tanita Tikaram

from the album Ancient Heart
- A-side: "World Outside Your Window"
- B-side: "For All These Years (Instrumental), Good Tradition (Live), He Likes The Sun (Live)"
- Released: 27 February 1989
- Recorded: 1988
- Studio: Red House Studios (Silsoe, England)
- Genre: Folk rock
- Label: WEA
- Songwriter: Tanita Tikaram
- Producers: Peter van Hooke, Rod Argent

Tanita Tikaram singles chronology
"Cathedral Song" (1989)	"World Outside Your Window" (1989)	"We Almost Got It Together" (1990)

"World Outside Your Window" was the fourth and last single to be released from Ancient Heart, the highly successful debut album of Tanita Tikaram. This single peaked at #58 in UK.

== Releases ==
The single was released on 27 February 1989. The 7" B-side is an instrumental version of "For All These Years". The 12" adds a live version of the first single "Good Tradition" and the limited CD the live "He Likes The Sun". Studio versions of all tracks appear on the Ancient Heart album.

== Critical reception ==
Upon release, Richard Lowe of Smash Hits wrote: "Tanita can knock out an extremely whistleable tune and this is one of her best. As jaunty and poppy as "Good Tradition"." Music & Media commented: "The fourth track taken from Ancient Heart is yet another catchy tune. Similar to "Good Tradition"." John Mangan of The Age described the song as a "mellow, pleasant piece". He added: "While the song doesn't break too much new ground, Tikaram sings it with a self-conscious conviction devoid of the histrionic excesses that can mar this type of music."

In a review of Ancient Heart, Robin Denselow of The Guardian commented: "Tikaram has an enviable knack of knocking out strong, gently sturdy melodies, [such as] the charming, thoughtful "World Outside Your Window", which uses hints of a reggae rhythm." Tom Moon of The Philadelphia Inquirer commented: "...the other truly breathtaking song, "World Outside Your Window", is centered by Tikaram's freight-train vocal presence."

== Charts ==
Chart (1989)	Peak position
Dutch Singles Chart	80
UK Singles Chart	58
Iceland (Íslenski Listinn Topp 10)	3
