= Linda Smith's A Brief History of Timewasting =

BBC Radio 4 sitcom

- Genre: Comedy
- Running time: 30 minutes
- Country of origin: United Kingdom
- Language: English
- Home station: BBC Radio 4
- Starring: Linda Smith, Chris Neill, Margaret John, Femi Elufowoju Jr.
- Written by: Linda Smith
- Produced by: Lucy Armitage (series 1); Jon Rolph (series 2)
- No. of series: 2
- No. of episodes: 12
- Opening theme: "Flowers on the Wall" by The Statler Brothers

Linda Smith's A Brief History of Timewasting is a BBC Radio 4 situation comedy show written by and starring Linda Smith. It ran for two series of six episodes each from July 2001 until July 2002.

Set in East London, where Smith herself lived, A Brief History of Timewasting concerned the struggle of a single woman to fill the day, helped by her inept, sugar-loving, live-in builder Chris (Chris Neill), morbid elderly neighbour Betty (Margaret John), and minicab driver Worra (Femi Elufowoju Jr). Supporting roles were played by Jeremy Hardy and Martin Hyder. Many familiar voices from Radio 4, including then-chief announcer Peter Donaldson, Thought for the Day regular Rabbi Lionel Blue, and Woman's Hour stalwart Jenni Murray, appeared as themselves.

The programme's page on the Radio 4 website says that the show was set in an East London tower block, but details of Chris's building work demonstrate that Linda and Betty lived in neighbouring terraced houses.

Following Smith's death in 2006, Jeremy Hardy revealed that Linda had been working on a third series.

== Episodes ==
=== Series 1 ===
Episode	Original airdate	Title
1	12 July 2001	"The Carpet Sweeper"
2	19 July 2001	"East End Mafia"
3	26 July 2001	"Opera, Gas, and Gardening"
4	2 August 2001	"A Day Trip to Romney Marsh"
5	9 August 2001	"Coffins, Funerals, and Nursing Homes"
6	16 August 2001	"999 Emergency"

=== Series 2 ===
Episode	Original airdate	Title
1	4 June 2002	"Fragile Peace"
2	11 June 2002	"Poltergeist"
3	18 June 2002	"Museum of East End Life"
4	25 June 2002	"New Islington"
5	2 July 2002	"Neighbourhood Watch"
6	9 July 2002	"The End of Timewasting"
