= Marc Haynes =

British comedy writer, radio broadcaster and podcaster

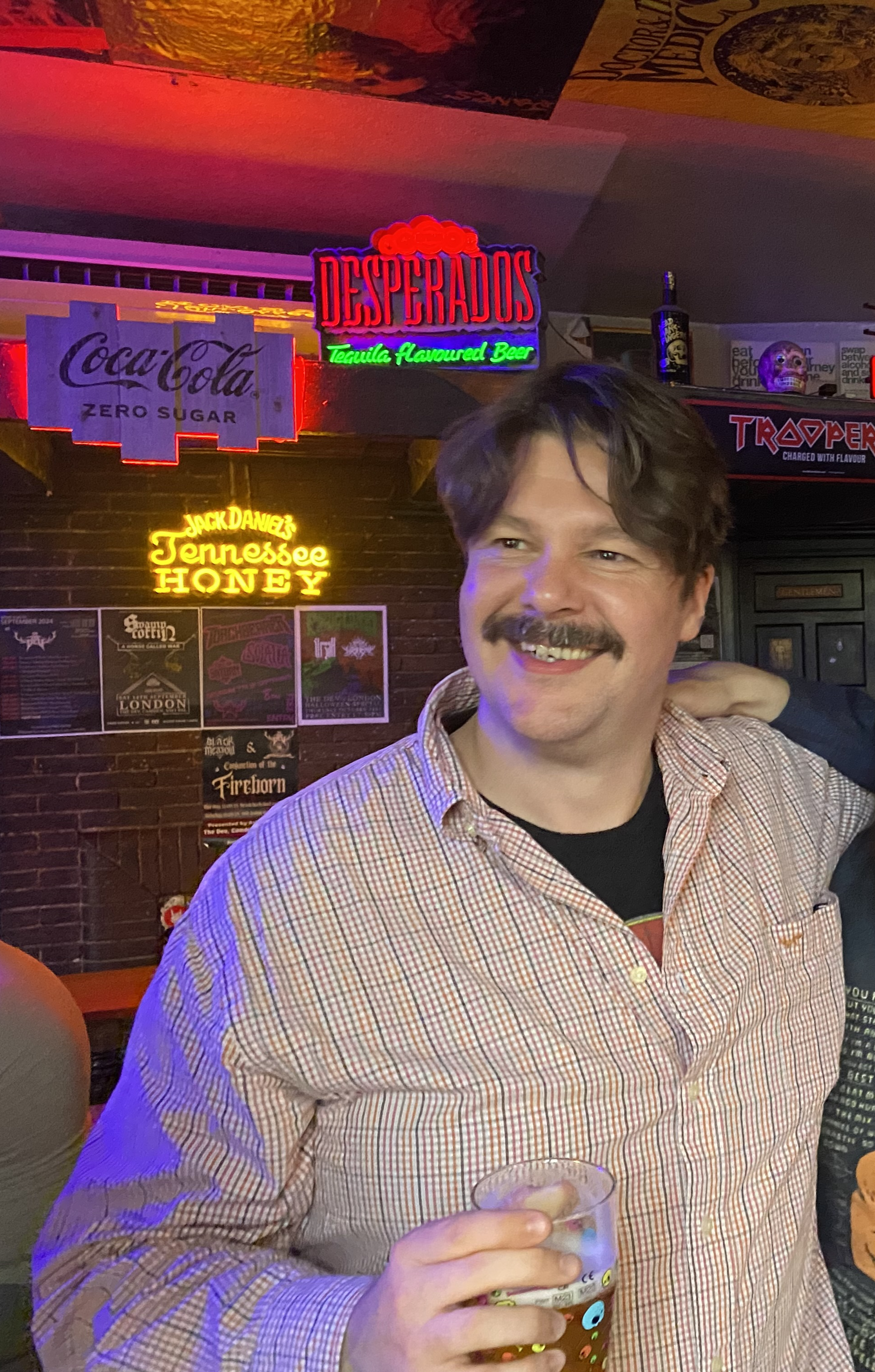
- Haynes in 2024
- Born: Marc Haynes; 5 April 1976 (age 50); Greater London, England

Comedy career
- Years active: 1997–present
- Medium: Television, radio, podcasting

Marc Haynes (born 5 April 1976) is an English comedy writer, radio broadcaster and podcaster.

== Biography ==
Marc Haynes was brought up in London and won the 1998 edition of the Daily Telegraph Open Mic Award for stand-up comedy, the finals of which also featured Stephen Merchant and Dan Antopolski.

== Radio ==
From 2004 to 2007, he worked with Richard Bacon on his XFM and Capital Radio shows. From 2007 to 2008, he worked with Alex Zane on the XFM breakfast show, before starting a weekly show and podcast called "Certificate X." Since 2010, he has hosted regular shows on BBC 6 Music with Bacon.

== Writing ==
He is a regular writer on the ITV comedy shows Celebrity Juice and Richard Bacon's Beer and Pizza Club.

His radio credits include two series of the sitcom Clement Doesn't Live Here Anymore on BBC Radio 4 and co-writing a one-off comedy for BBC Radio 4 with Danny Wallace called New World Order.

In November 2008, his piece entitled "Fifty Years Of Popular Song Condensed Into A Single Sentence" was published by McSweeneys.

== Podcasts ==
Marc co-hosts popular podcast 'WrestleMe' with Pete Donaldson. The pair discuss every Wrestlemania event in chronological order, as well as occasional diversions into notable moments from the wider history of professional wrestling. The show's basic concept contrasts Haynes' lifelong enthusiasm for wrestling against Donaldson's relative lack of knowledge on the sport. GQ magazine described the podcast as ‘Enrapturing…part-wrestling podcast, part-breakdown of the sheer ridiculousness of pro wrestling, and part-examination of the human condition’. A live version of the podcast first was hosted by Haynes and Donaldson in September 2018, and a Patreon page for the show was launched in March 2020. Subscribers receive shows which delve into historic WCW pay-per-views, as well as other notable moments from WWE history.
