= What's My Line? (British game show) =

British TV panel game show (1951–1996)

- Genre: Panel game show
- Created by: Mark Goodson; Bill Todman
- Presented by: Eamonn Andrews (1951–63; 1984–87); David Jacobs (1973–74); Penelope Keith (1988); Angela Rippon (1988–90); Emma Forbes (1994–96)
- Country of origin: United Kingdom
- Original language: English
- No. of series: 12 (BBC-tv); 2 (BBC2); 7 (ITV); 3 (HTV/Meridian)
- No. of episodes: 413 (BBC-tv); 23 (BBC2); 160 (ITV); 42 (HTV/Meridian)

Production
- Running time: 30 minutes (inc. adverts)
- Production companies: Thames in association with Mark Goodson Productions and Talbot Television (1984–90); Fremantle (UK) Productions (1994–96)

Original release
- Network: BBC Television Service
- Release: 16 July 1951 – 13 May 1963
- Network: BBC2
- Release: 23 August 1973 – 25 May 1974
- Network: ITV
- Release: 26 March 1984 – 31 August 1990
- Network: HTV/Meridian
- Release: 19 September 1994 – 17 December 1996

Related
- What's My Line?

What's My Line? is a panel game show based on the American version of the same name. It was originally aired on BBC Television Service from 16 July 1951 to 13 May 1963, hosted by Eamonn Andrews. It was revived by BBC2 from 23 August 1973 to 25 May 1974, hosted by David Jacobs, and then by ITV from 26 March 1984 to 31 August 1990. The ITV incarnation was first hosted by Eamonn Andrews from 1984 until his death in 1987, then by Penelope Keith for a part of 1988 before Angela Rippon took over until 1990. Two regional ITV stations, HTV and Meridian, revived it again from 19 September 1994 to 17 December 1996, when it was hosted by Emma Forbes.

Regular panelists on the original version were Jerry Desmonde, Gilbert Harding, David Nixon, Barbara Kelly and Isobel Barnett.

== Transmissions ==
=== BBC Television Service ===
Series	Start date	End date	Episodes
1	16 July 1951	7 April 1952	39
2	18 August 1952	28 June 1953	46
3	1 November 1953	20 June 1954	34
4	26 September 1954	20 March 1955	26
5	24 October 1955	16 July 1956	39
6	30 September 1956	7 April 1957	28
7	5 October 1957	22 June 1958	38
8	28 September 1958	22 March 1959	26
9	30 August 1959	24 April 1960	35
10	18 September 1960	21 May 1961	34
11	1 October 1961	3 June 1962	35
12	1 October 1962	13 May 1963	33

=== BBC2 ===
==== Series ====
Series	Start date	End date	Episodes
1	23 August 1973	20 September 1973	5
2	19 January 1974	25 May 1974	17

==== Specials ====
Date	Entitle
25 December 1973	Christmas Special

=== Thames ===
==== Series ====
Series	Start date	End date	Episodes
1	26 March 1984	2 July 1984	14
2	18 February 1985	20 May 1985	14
3	31 March 1986	30 June 1986	13
4	6 April 1987	18 May 1987	7
5	22 February 1988	25 March 1988	40
5	15 August 1988	2 September 1988	40
6	13 December 1988	10 February 1989	38
6	15 March 1989	7 April 1989	38
7	10 July 1990	31 August 1990	32

==== Specials ====
Date	Entitle
24 December 1984	Christmas Special
30 December 1985	Christmas Special

=== HTV/Meridian ===
Series	Start date	End date	Episodes
1	19 September 1994	19 December 1994	14
2	18 September 1995	18 December 1995	14
3	17 September 1996	17 December 1996	14
