= Leicester Gazette =

English newspaper

- Owner: Multi-Stakeholder Co-operative
- Founder(s): Rhys Everquill, Emma Guy, Megan Lupton
- Membership: 150
- Founded: 3 January 2023 (registered), 31 March 2023 (launched, online), 1 December 2025 (launched, print)
- Language: English
- City: Leicester
- Circulation: 10,000 (as of December 2026)
- ISSN: 2978-1493 (print); 2978-1485 (web)
- Website: leicester.news

The Leicester Gazette is a local, independent newspaper covering Leicester and Leicestershire. Launched in March 2023, the Gazette publishes investigative journalism, feature stories and news reports. The publication is a co-operative, owned by its workers and readers. Members pay a monthly or annual fee, similar to The Bristol Cable model.

It is a member of Co-operatives UK, Impress, Independent Community News Network, Independent Media Association, the Local Democracy Reporting Service and Social Enterprise UK.

== History ==
The Gazette was founded by Rhys Everquill, Emma Guy and Megan Lupton after a crowdfunding campaign and a small grant from Central England Co-operative. It was formed in opposition to the Leicester Mercury business model, which, like other Reach plc publications, has been accused of clickbait, sensationalism, and intrusive advertising.

The newspaper has further funding from De Montfort University, Scurrah Wainwright Charity, Lush, Midcounties Co-operative, among others.

The newspaper rebranded in September 2024, changing its name from Great Central Gazette to Leicester Gazette. It also expanded into Leicestershire.

In December 2025, the Gazette launched a quarterly print edition and in April 2026 launched a news and social media app powered by Mastodon.

On 8 October 2026, two Leicester Gazette reporters were arrested by Leicestershire Police while covering a pro-Palestine Action protest outside Elbit Systems-owned UAV Tactical Systems in Braunstone Town. The was condemned by the National Union of Journalists and Reporters Without Borders.

The Leicester Gazette expanded its print edition to 10,000 copies after receiving an £81,999 grant from the government’s Local News Fund.

== Notable investigations and stories ==
The Leicester Gazette was the first newspaper to publish details of Palantir Technologies contract with Leicestershire Police, the first contract of its kind with a UK police force. Leicestershire Police subsequently blocked any attempt by Gazette reporters to retrieve a copy of the contract via freedom of information request, citing “national security” and “law enforcement” exemptions. The investigation was cited in the House of Commons by Shockat Adam MP and in the House of Lords by Jenny Jones, Baroness Jones of Moulsecoomb.. In late April 2026, the Information Commissioner's Office ruled in favour of the Gazette and the newspaper subsequently published a redacted contract on their website.

In the wake of the 2025 election to Leicestershire County Council, the Leicester Gazette revealed that the newly elected deputy leader of the council, Joseph Boam, shared homophobic, sexist and Islamophobic content on previously undiscovered social media channels. The investigation was picked up by national news outlets, including Private Eye.

On 7 August 2025, the Leicester Gazette identified two far-right YouTubers involved in anti-immigration protests in Leicester.

== Awards ==
The Gazette and its journalists have won several awards:

- Tenacious Journalists 2026
- Women in Journalism's Georgina Henry Award 2025
- Central England Prestige Award's Community News Publication of the Year 2025
