= Ian Messiter =

English radio producer (1920–1999)

Ian Cassan Messiter (2 April 1920 – 22 November 1999) was an English BBC Radio producer and the creator of a number of panel games, including Just a Minute, Dealing With Daniels and Many a Slip. Messiter brought the successful twenty questions format to BBC Radio and was programme associate for Family Fortunes.

== Biography ==
Ian Messiter was born in Dudley, Worcestershire, and educated at Winton House School, near Winchester, and Sherborne School in Dorset.

In his autobiography, My Life and Other Games (1990), Messiter described how an incident during a history lesson at Sherborne School became the inspiration for the Just a Minute radio panel-game.

Messiter acted as whistle-blower on Just a Minute, and its predecessor One Minute, Please. He appeared in the first series of BBC science-fiction quiz show The Adventure Game in 1980 as the Rangdo, the leader of the alien Argonds, and contributed ideas for puzzles in the series. He published his autobiography My Life and Other Games in 1990.

Nicholas Parsons stated that Just a Minute is "perhaps the most deceptively simple, enduring, popular and much-copied comedy game on radio or television anywhere". In each edition, Messiter is acknowledged as the inventor of the game.

== Family ==
Messiter married Enid, née Senior. They had two children: a daughter, Susan, who lives in Cambridgeshire, and a son, Malcolm Messiter, who is an oboist.
