= Malcolm Messiter =

British oboist (born 1949)

Malcolm Messiter (born 1949) is a British oboist, particularly known for his recording of the virtuosic "La Favorita" concerto by Antonio Pasculli. He is the son of Ian Messiter, the creator of the BBC panel show Just a Minute, and his wife Enid (née Senior).

Messiter has recorded with the National Philharmonic Orchestra, the Guildhall String Ensemble and the London Festival Orchestra. He was featured soloist for the theme to BBC TV’s The Secret Garden (1975), and his oboe playing features prominently in the song Twist in My Sobriety by Tanita Tikaram.

== Education ==
Messiter began playing the oboe at the age of 15 whilst a student at Bryanston School in Blandford Forum, Dorset. His first oboe teacher was Douglas Heffer, who taught both the oboe and English at Bryanston. Messiter was extremely enthusiastic from the onset and was known to play chamber music concerts at the school almost every week. When first beginning the oboe, Heffer bought him an oboe, the cost of which was put on the school bill, much to the surprise of his parents.

In 1967, after studying the oboe for only two years, Messiter won a scholarship to the Paris Conservatoire. Messiter studied in Paris with Pierre Pierlôt, before returning to London in 1969 to study with Sidney Sutcliffe at the Royal College of Music. Whilst there, he won the Joy Boughton, the Grade 5 and the R.A.O.S. Prizes as well as a Performers' A.R.C.M. with Honours.
