= Cathedral Song =

Single by Tanita Tikaram

from the album Ancient Heart
- A-side: "Cathedral Song"
- B-side: "Sighing Innocents, Fireflies In The Kitchen, Let’s Make Everybody Smile Today, Over To You All [LIVE]"
- Released: 2 January 1989
- Recorded: 1988
- Studio: Red House Studios (Silsoe, England)
- Genre: Folk rock
- Length: 2:52
- Label: WEA
- Songwriter(s): Tanita Tikaram
- Producer(s): Peter Van Hooke, Rod Argent

Tanita Tikaram singles chronology
"Twist in My Sobriety" (1988)	"Cathedral Song" (1989)	"World Outside Your Window" (1989)

"Cathedral Song" is a song by English singer-songwriter Tanita Tikaram, released as a single from her debut album, Ancient Heart (1988). It peaked at #48 in the UK. An extended length music video was made from the song, portraying a love story between two swimmers in a Summer setting. The video was shot in black and white, and Tikaram appears only in studio footage, not on the external footage. Most of the music video was filmed in Portugal, in Praia Grande, Praia do Guincho, Estoril and Cristo Rei sanctuary.

== Releases ==
WEA released a limited edition 7-inch EP box set which had three prints from the video. Other formats also had live tracks - "Over You All" (CD/7-inch box), "Let's Make Everybody Smile Today" (CD/12-inch/7-inch box) and "Fireflies In The Kitchen" (12-inch). Studio versions of the latter two were not recorded.

== Reception ==
Upon its release, Jerry Smith of Music Week praised it as a "wonderfully effective, dreamy ballad, with breathy vocal and complimentary sparse backing" that "deserves wide exposure". William Shaw of Smash Hits wrote, "It's a pleasant enough tune; a dreamy, floaty thing, full of haunting organs and guitar pluckings. But, if like me you spend all your time wondering what Tanita is singing about, then the sepulchral beauty of the whole thing kind of passes you by."

== Charts ==
Chart (1989)	Peak position
Australia (ARIA)	120
Finland (Suomen virallinen lista)	17
Netherlands (Single Top 100)	36
Netherlands (Tipparade)	2
UK Singles (OCC)	48
West Germany (GfK Entertainment Charts)	71

== Covers ==
The song was covered by Brazilian singer Zélia Duncan. Her version, which has a similar arrangement but lyrics in Portuguese, was released in her second homonymous album (1994) and became a smash hit in Brazil. Her version (titled simply "Catedral") was also covered by Leandro from Leandro e Leonardo and by Renato Russo from Legião Urbana.
