= Linda Smith (comedian) =

English comedian

- Smith on QI in 2003
- Born: Linda Helen Smith; 29 January 1958; Erith, England
- Died: 27 February 2006 (aged 48); London, England
- Education: Bexley College; University of Sheffield (BA)
- Occupation: Comedian
- Years active: 1987–2006
- Partner: Warren Lakin

Linda Helen Smith (29 January 1958 – 27 February 2006) was an English comedian and comedy writer. She appeared regularly on Radio 4 panel games, and was voted "Wittiest Living Person" by listeners in 2002. From 2004 to 2006, she was head of the British Humanist Association.

== Life and career ==
Smith was born in Erith, Kent, in 1958 and was educated at Erith College of Technology (now Bexley College) and at the University of Sheffield, from which she graduated in English and Drama. She was a founder member of the theatre company Sheffield Popular Theatre before turning to comedy. She never joined a political grouping, claiming that The Tufty Club was the only outfit she ever joined. Her early stand-up appearances were with her university friend Ann Lavelle in a double act called Token Women and then Tuff Lovers. They performed at small comedy clubs and many solidarity benefit shows on the Pit Stop Tour which stopped off at miners' welfare clubs during the latter stages of the 1984–1985 national miners' strike. She became a full-time solo stand-up comedian in 1986.

In 1987, she won the Hackney Empire New Act of the Year, then known as the New London Comic Award, and performed on the Edinburgh Fringe before breaking into radio comedy. Her first professional appearance at the Edinburgh Fringe was in 1988 on a double bill at The Comedy Boom. Between then and 1994, she performed solo shows and shared the stage at various fringe venues with comedy pals such as Henry Normal, Hattie Hayridge and Betty Spital.

Her first appearances on national radio were on Radio 5's The Treatment in 1997. She was subsequently a regular panellist on The News Quiz and Just a Minute and appeared frequently on I'm Sorry I Haven't a Clue (from June 2001 onwards), Have I Got News for You, Mock the Week, Countdown and QI. She wrote and starred in her own Radio 4 sitcom, Linda Smith's A Brief History of Timewasting. After appearing on Radio 4's Devout Sceptics to discuss her beliefs, she was asked by the British Humanist Association (BHA) to become president of the society, a role that she occupied with commitment from 2004 until her death. In 2002, she was voted 'Wittiest Living Person' by listeners to BBC Radio 4's Word of Mouth. In his 2003 book Classic Radio Comedy, Mat Coward called Smith "the funniest woman on radio today".

On 17 November 2003, Smith appeared on the BBC television show Room 101, during which she successfully managed to put in "adults who read Harry Potter books", Tim Henman, "Back to School signs that appear in shops" and "posh people". However, she failed to put in bow ties after host Paul Merton pointed out that Stan Laurel regularly wore a bow tie.

From 2001 to 2004, Smith toured her full-length solo show 'Wrap Up Warm' to sold-out audiences at theatres and arts centres throughout Britain.

== Illness, death and legacy ==
On 27 February 2006 in Wanstead, Smith died as a consequence of ovarian cancer at the age of 48. She had been diagnosed with ovarian cancer three and a half years earlier but, not wanting to be thought of as a patient or a victim, she did not want people to know. Before she died, she chose that her funeral be humanist, and her memorial at the Theatre Royal, Stratford East, on 10 March, was dedicated to the British Humanist Association. Her life and work were honoured at the British Academy Television Awards in 2006. The first episode of Dawn French's Girls Who Do Comedy was dedicated to the memory of Smith. A tribute edition of The News Quiz, featuring clips of Smith's appearances and personal memories of her from other panellists, was broadcast on BBC Radio 4 on 3 March 2006, hosted by Simon Hoggart.

Three tribute gigs were held in her memory in 2006. The first, In Praise of an English Radical, took place on 14 May at the Lyceum Theatre, Sheffield; the second, Tippy Top: An Evening of Linda Smith's Favourite Things, took place on 4 June at the Victoria Palace Theatre, London; and the third was a midnight benefit gig at the Assembly Rooms, Edinburgh, on 22 August. In August 2006, Andy Hamilton presented a BBC Radio 4 tribute, Linda Smith: A Modern Radio Star. An anthology on CD, I Think the Nurses Are Stealing My Clothes: The Very Best of Linda Smith, was released in November 2006 as was a book with the same name. A tribute show of the same name was aired on BBC Radio 4 on 10 November 2006. Smith's sell-out stage show Wrap Up Warm has been available on CD since November 2006. A biography of Linda's life and career, Driving Miss Smith, written by her partner Warren Lakin, was published by Hodder & Stoughton in September 2007. A tribute show, Linda Smith's Favourite Things Vol. 2, was held at the Victoria Palace on 28 October to coincide with the publication of the book.

Smith was working on a third series of A Brief History of Timewasting before she became incapacitated by her illness. As a tribute, the online radio station BBC 7 ran the previous two series, the first all on one day.

The University of Kent holds The Linda Smith Collection as the foundation of the British Stand-Up Comedy Archive. It includes notes, diaries, scripts, audio-visual recordings, photographs, press cuttings, correspondence and publicity material covering her entire life and career. It was deposited at the University of Kent by Smith's partner Warren Lakin in 2013. Since 2015, the University of Kent has organised the annual Linda Smith Lecture, in which comedians and writers have spoken about issues in the comedy industry as well as recalling memories of Smith. To date, the speakers have been Mark Thomas (2015), Andy Hamilton (2016), Susan Calman (2017), Barry Cryer (2018), Jo Brand (2019), Robin Ince (2021), Angela Barnes (2022), Jan Ravens (2023), Henry Normal (2024), and Bridget Christie (2025). A video of Robin Ince's Linda Smith Lecture is available as a download from Go Faster Stripe.

Between 2010 and 2014, a series of six tribute shows featuring prominent comedians and musicians called Loving Linda took place at the Rose Theatre, Kingston to raise money for Target Ovarian Cancer. Two further Loving Linda shows were staged at the Assembly Rooms, Edinburgh, in August 2018 and the Cambridge Theatre, London, in October 2018.

In 2019, Chortle published a list of 12 of Smith's best jokes to mark her birthday.

== Personal life ==
Smith met her partner Warren Lakin when Sheffield Popular Theatre was formed in 1983, and they were together for 23 years until her death.

== Books ==
- Sit-Down Comedy (contributor to anthology, ed Malcolm Hardee & John Fleming) Ebury Press/Random House, 2003. ISBN 0-09-188924-3; ISBN 978-0-09-188924-1
