= Good Tradition =

Single by Tanita Tikaram

from the album Ancient Heart
- A-side: "Good Tradition"
- B-side: "Valentine Heart (Demo Version), Poor Cow, Cathedral Song"
- Released: 27 June 1988
- Recorded: 1988
- Studio: Red House Studios (Silsoe, England)
- Genre: Folk rock
- Length: 2:52
- Label: WEA
- Songwriter: Tanita Tikaram
- Producers: Peter Van Hooke, Rod Argent

Tanita Tikaram singles chronology
"Good Tradition" (1988)	"Twist in My Sobriety" (1988)

Music videos
- "Good Tradition" on YouTube

"Good Tradition" is a song, written and originally recorded by British pop/folk singer-songwriter Tanita Tikaram, released as the first single from her debut album, Ancient Heart (1988). When it was released in June 1988, it went largely unnoticed and attracted little media attention. The song therefore did not get much airplay, but weeks after its release, the single started climbing up the charts and finally reached No. 10 on the UK Singles Chart on 21 August 1988.

== Background ==
To celebrate, WEA records released a limited edition design by Tikaram in which she tells the brief story of the song, the song's success on the charts, and thanks everyone that supported the song. In the design Tikaram notes each Sunday week ending date from the first week of single release, alongside its position on the UK Singles Chart for that week in question. The positions noted by Tikaram are 149-163-80-67-36-23-15-10, all up to the point the single made the top 10.

Tikaram entered the UK Top 40 singles chart at #36 as broadcast on 6 August 1988 by Bruno Brookes on BBC Radio 1's Live Chart Countdown and on BBC1's live broadcast of Top of The Pops on 4 August 1988.

In recent years, the Official Charts Company have revised historical charts due to more precise data and record sales being available. "Good Tradition" now shows as entering at #39. The rest of its chart run has been unaffected.

== Critical reception ==
Pan-European magazine Music & Media wrote, "An up-tempo country-tinged number by this 'exciting new-comer. Her voice is strong, full of personality and has the same sort of deadpan quality as Chrissie Hynde."

== Music video ==
The accompanying music video for "Good Tradition" features Tikaram playing in front of judges (one played by Anthony Head) at an audition, following on from an unsuccessful auditionee. At first shy, Tikaram strikes a couple of notes and the song begins and, as it develops, the judges and the crew from the theatre start dancing to the tune. At the end Tikaram is shown smiling.

== Charts ==
Chart (1988–1989)	Peak position
Australia (ARIA)	142
Belgium (Ultratop Flanders)	39
Ireland (IRMA)	9
Luxembourg (Radio Luxembourg)	6
Netherlands (Single Top 100)	46
Netherlands (Tipparade)	3
Sweden (Sverigetopplistan)	4
UK Singles (OCC)	10
Europe (Eurochart Hot 100)	29
Quebec (ADISQ)	17

== Cover versions ==
With lyrics in Swedish by Keith Almgren, the song was covered by Kikki Danielsson & Roosarna on the 1990 album På lugnare vatten as I god tradition ("In good tradition").
