= List of Desert Island Discs episodes (1961–1970) =

BBC Radio 4 programme

The BBC Radio 4 programme Desert Island Discs invites castaways to choose eight pieces of music, a book (in addition to the Bible – or a religious text appropriate to that person's beliefs – and the Complete Works of Shakespeare) and a luxury item that they would take to an imaginary desert island, where they will be marooned indefinitely. The rules state that the chosen luxury item must not be anything animate, nor anything that enables the castaway to escape from the island, for instance a radio set, sailing yacht or aeroplane. The choices of book and luxury can sometimes give insight into the guest's life, and the choices of guests between 1961 and 1970 are listed here.

== 1961 ==
Date	Castaway	Book	Luxury	More info
2 January 1961	Victor Gollancz	The Year of Grace by Victor Gollancz	Meerschaum pipe	more
9 January 1961	Kenneth Horne	Anthology of English verse	Piece of crystal	more
16 January 1961	Beverley Sisters	Book of Soccer by Billy Wright, The Story of Mankind by Hendrik van Loon and The Science of Life by H. G. Wells	Rolls-Royce, water skis and piano	more
23 January 1961	Ted Williams	Horse and Hound	Cigarettes	more
30 January 1961	Cyril Mills	Les Miserables by Victor Hugo	Bed	more
6 February 1961	Mary Ure	The collected plays of John Osborne	Painting by Rembrandt in the National Gallery	more
13 February 1961	Antonio	Don Quixote by Miguel de Cervantes	Crucifix and family photo album	more
20 February 1961	Jimmy Edwards	Lady Chatterley's Lover by D.H. Lawrence	Euphonium	more
27 February 1961	June Bronhill	The poems of Ogden Nash	Suntan oil	more
6 March 1961	James Mason	Finnegans Wake by James Joyce	Bagpipes	more
13 March 1961	Carmen Dragon	Book on astronomy	Telescope	more
20 March 1961	Michael Wilding	Encyclopædia Britannica	Golf clubs and balls	more
27 March 1961	Kenneth McKellar	Encyclopædia Britannica	Tuning fork	more
3 April 1961	Peter Scott	The drawings of Leonardo da Vinci	Underwater mask	more
10 April 1961	Barbara Jefford	History of the English Speaking Peoples by Winston Churchill	Piano	more
17 April 1961	Brian Reece	Navigational manual	Still	more
24 April 1961	Adam Faith	Brave New World by Aldous Huxley	Cold cure, pack of cards and writing materials	more
1 May 1961	Finlay Currie	The Dictionary of National Biography	17th-century miniature by Peter Oliver	more
8 May 1961	Ralph Reader	Goodbye Mr Chips by James Hilton	Typewriter and paper	more
15 May 1961	Pietro Annigoni	International timetable of ships and trains	Drawing materials and pillow	more
22 May 1961	Kenneth Williams	The collected works of George Bernard Shaw	Michelangelo's Apollo	more
29 May 1961	Kingsley Amis	The collected poetry of Robert Graves	American whiskey	more
5 June 1961	Julian Bream	Collection of 16th and 17th-century English poetry	Guitar, manuscript paper and pens	more
12 June 1961	Richard Murdoch	History of the world	Golf clubs and balls	more
19 June 1961	Dr W Grey Walter	Everybody's handbook for survival on a desert island	Computer	more
26 June 1961	Ann Haydon	The plays of Johann Wolfgang Goethe	Insect repellent	more
3 July 1961	Roy Hay	Candide by Voltaire	Asparagus seed	more
10 July 1961	Anna Massey	Book on mathematics	Family photographs and tape recorder	more
17 July 1961	Joe Davis	Whitaker's Almanack	Golf clubs and balls	more
24 July 1961	Nelson Riddle	The collected poetry of Robert Frost	Piano	more
31 July 1961	Yvonne Mitchell	Compilation of works of philosophy	Writing materials	more
7 August 1961	Gerald Durrell	Encyclopædia Britannica	Writing materials	more
14 August 1961	Jack Fingleton	The Imitation of Christ by Thomas à Kempis	Golf clubs and balls	more
21 August 1961	Diana Dors	Anthology of poetry	Writing materials	more
28 August 1961	Edward Ward	Encyclopædia Britannica	Carving tools	more
4 September 1961	John Slater	Plays and Prefaces by George Bernard Shaw	Still	more
11 September 1961	Coral Browne	The Happy Prince and Other Tales by Oscar Wilde	Sable coat	more
18 September 1961	Commander Sir Stephen King-Hall	Parliamentary Practice by Erskine May	Goya's portrait of the Duke of Wellington	more
2 October 1961	Tommy Reilly	Picture of the English countryside	Harmonica	more
9 October 1961	Canon Noel Duckworth	The Imitation of Christ by Thomas à Kempis	Radio receiver	more
16 October 1961	Hattie Jacques	Oxford Dictionary of Quotations	Photograph and recording of her family	more
30 October 1961	Sir Gerald Beadle	Life of Samuel Johnson by James Boswell	Claret	more
6 November 1961	Wee Georgie Wood	Memoirs of a Midget by Walter de la Mare	Writing materials	more
13 November 1961	Rupert Davies	Candide by Voltaire	Lump of jade	more
20 November 1961	Virgil Thomson	Encyclopædia Britannica	Music manuscript paper, pencils and rubber	more
27 November 1961	Joan Collins	Teach yourself manual of the principal foreign languages	Television set	more
4 December 1961	Paul Gallico	Alice in Wonderland by Lewis Carroll	Writing materials	more
11 December 1961	Sir Michael Balcon	Oxford English Dictionary	Wine	more
18 December 1961	Bob Hope	Gone with the Wind by Margaret Mitchell	A little money	more
25 December 1961	Gracie Fields	The Forsyte Saga by John Galsworthy	Reproduction of Renoir's The Picnic	more

== 1962 ==
Date	Castaway	Book	Luxury	More info
1 January 1962	James Gunn	Large anthology of poetry	Painting materials	more
8 January 1962	Hughie Green	An American Tragedy by Theodore Dreiser	Looking glass	more
15 January 1962	Stuart Hibberd	Another World Than This by Vita Sackville-West	Recorder	more
22 January 1962	Ken Sykora	Science for the Citizen	Guitar	more
29 January 1962	Sir John Gielgud	Oxford Dictionary of Quotations	Watercolour of Versailles by Raoul Dufy	more
5 February 1962	Kay Cavendish	Encyclopædia Britannica	Flower seeds and armchair	more
12 February 1962	Stanley Holloway	Mrs Beeton's Household Management	Parking meter and plenty of change	more
19 February 1962	Frank Chacksfield	The Pickwick Papers by Charles Dickens	Cine camera	more
26 February 1962	H E Bates	English lyrics	Banjo	more
5 March 1962	Irene Handl	Reproductions of her favourite pictures	Pencils and paper	more
12 March 1962	Colonel A D Wintle	Large blank book	Dog whip	more
19 March 1962	Louis Kentner	Oblomov by Ivan Goncharov	Pencils and paper	more
26 March 1962	Raymond Glendenning	Pears Cyclopaedia	Watercolour paints	more
2 April 1962	Frank Launder and Sidney Gilliat	A child's guide to boatbuilding and Short Stories by O Henry	Writing materials and reclining chair	more
9 April 1962	Leslie Phillips	The rudiments of several useful languages	Chess board with jade pieces	more
16 April 1962	Billy Butlin	Short Stories by O Henry	Drawing board, paper and pencils	more
23 April 1962	Robert Morley	The rules of patience	Two packs of cards with photographs of his family on the backs	more
30 April 1962	Christina Foyle	The Diary of a Nobody by George Grossmith	Her commonplace book	more
7 May 1962	Leslie Crowther	The Second World War by Sir Winston Churchill	Sport suit	more
14 May 1962	Sir Fitzroy Maclean	As many works as possible by Robert Louis Stevenson	Still	more
21 May 1962	Sidney Nolan	Chinese language course	Snorkel mask	more
28 May 1962	Sir Alan Cobham	History of the English-Speaking Peoples by Sir Winston Churchill	Jamaican cigars	more
4 June 1962	Eric Hosking	Field guide to the island's birds	Camera and film	more
11 June 1962	Alistair Cooke	Chrestomathy by H L Mencken	Tape recorder	more
18 June 1962	Giovanni Martinelli	Inferno by Dante Alighieri	Bronze statuette of David by Verrocchio	more
25 June 1962	John Allegro	Some novels by P G Wodehouse	Rolls-Royce engine	more
2 July 1962	Franklin Engelmann	English dictionary	Painting materials	more
9 July 1962	Stephen Spender	History of the Renaissance by Jacob Burckhardt	Painting materials	more
16 July 1962	Bruce Forsyth	The Rubaiyat by Omar Khayyam	Golf clubs and balls	more
23 July 1962	Paul Rogers	Chambers' Encyclopaedia	Penny whistle	more
30 July 1962	Merfyn Turner	A history of Wales	Picasso's The Child and the Dove	more
6 August 1962	Charlie Chester	The Forsyte Saga by John Galsworthy	Typewriter and paper	more
13 August 1962	Lionel Tertis	Books by H Rider Haggard, Sir Arthur Conan Doyle and Jules Verne	Portrait of his wife	more
20 August 1962	Edith Day	Essays by Ralph Waldo Emerson	Radio receiver	more
27 August 1962	Mario del Monaco	English grammar	Raphael's The Marriage of Maria	more
3 September 1962	R F Delderfield	The French Revolution by Thomas Carlyle	Typewriter and paper	more
10 September 1962	Stanley Unwin	Grove's Dictionary of Music and Musicians	Painting materials	more
17 September 1962	L. Hugh Newman	Plays and Prefaces by George Bernard Shaw	Bed	more
24 September 1962	Peter Jones	Book on astronomy	Telescope	more
1 October 1962	Antony Hopkins	Piano sonatas by Beethoven	Piano	more
8 October 1962	Gwen Ffrangcon-Davies	The Swiss Family Robinson by Johann Wyss	Skin food	more
15 October 1962	Fanny and Johnnie Cradock	Smith's Dictionary of Greek and Roman Biography and Mythology and History of the English-Speaking Peoples by Sir Winston Churchill	Typewriter and paper and golf clubs and balls	more
29 October 1962	Pamela Hansford-Johnson	À la recherche du temps perdu by Marcel Proust	Van Eyck's Adoration of the Immaculate Lamb	more
5 November 1962	George Shearing	Masterman Ready by Frederick Marryat	Metal construction set	more
12 November 1962	Dr Robert Stopford	Oxford Book of English Verse	Painting materials	more
19 November 1962	Jack Warner	A Tale of Two Cities (in English and French) by Charles Dickens	Soap	more
26 November 1962	Peter Saunders	Who's Who in the Theatre	Electric blanket	more
3 December 1962	Anna Russell	Encyclopædia Britannica	Mobile from the Museum of Modern Art	more
10 December 1962	Acker Bilk	The Wind in the Willows by Kenneth Grahame	Apple seeds	more
17 December 1962	A G Street	Ladies Whose Bright Eyes by Ford Madox Ford	Painting of the south Wiltshire countryside	more
22 December 1962	Lord George Sanger	Seventy Years a Showman (autobiography of his great-great-grandfather)	Tea	more
24 December 1962	Clarkson Rose	History of the English-Speaking Peoples by Sir Winston Churchill	Writing materials	more
31 December 1962	George Mitchell	The Ring Cycle (The Score) by Richard Wagner	Music manuscript paper and pencils	more

== 1963 ==
Date	Castaway	Book	Luxury	More info
7 January 1963	Dorothy Squires	Vaughan Haddock's Book of Modern Verse	Piano	more
14 January 1963	Basil Boothroyd	Oxford Dictionary of Quotations	Current popular newspaper	more
21 January 1963	Richard Lewis	History of Art by H W Janson	Film projector	more
28 January 1963	Noël Coward	The Human Situation by MacNeill Dixon	Painting materials	more
4 February 1963	Sir Learie Constantine	The Old Curiosity Shop and David Copperfield by Charles Dickens	Cricket bat	more
11 February 1963	Michael Bentine	Encyclopædia Britannica	Painting materials	more
18 February 1963	Quentin Reynolds	The History of the Decline and Fall of the Roman Empire by Edward Gibbon	Typewriter and paper	more
25 February 1963	Cyril Ornadel	The Talmud	Piano	more
4 March 1963	Percy Thrower	Gardening encyclopaedia	Flower seeds	more
11 March 1963	Arthur Haynes	French language course	Ukulele	more
18 March 1963	Dudley Perkins	The Complete Works of John Milton	Piano	more
25 March 1963	Leslie Gilbert Illingworth	Instructions for making a still	Painting materials	more
1 April 1963	Sir Harry Whitlohn (fictional; April Fool's Day prank)	Telephone directory	Mountain	more
8 April 1963	Ted Willis	War and Peace by Leo Tolstoy	Concertina	more
15 April 1963	David Frost	The collected works of Geoffrey Chaucer	Potato crisps	more
22 April 1963	Marjorie Proops	Larousse Gastronomique	Looking glass	more
29 April 1963	George Chisholm	Anthology of humour	Trombone and hair restorer	more
6 May 1963	Professor L Dudley Stamp	Everyman's Encyclopaedia	Wine	more
13 May 1963	Frank Worrell	Work on anthropology by Max Gluckman	Film projector and cricket films	more
20 May 1963	Rowland Emmett	The Anatomy of Melancholy by Robert Burton	His daughter's teddy bear	more
27 May 1963	Birgit Nilsson	The Second World War by Sir Winston Churchill	Swedish crossword puzzles	more
3 June 1963	Barry Bucknell	Anthology of world poetry	Toilet set	more
10 June 1963	Eva Bartok	The Little Prince by Antoine de Saint-Exupéry	Painting materials	more
17 June 1963	Joe Loss	Selection of personal letters	Radio receiver	more
24 June 1963	Beryl Reid	The World Encyclopaedia of Cookery	Lipsticks	more
1 July 1963	Boyd Neel	Alice in Wonderland by Lewis Carroll	Whisky	more
8 July 1963	Juliette Gréco	Atlas	Writing materials	more
15 July 1963	Geraint Evans	Anthology of 20th century verse	Mouth organ	more
22 July 1963	Vivienne	Alice in Wonderland by Lewis Carroll	Painting materials	more
29 July 1963	Carleton Hobbs	The Forsyte Saga by John Galsworthy	Radio receiver	more
5 August 1963	Ian Fleming	War and Peace (in German) by Leo Tolstoy	Typewriter and paper	more
12 August 1963	Sir Charles Maclean	Volumes of the Illustrated London News	Piano	more
19 August 1963	Graham Hill	Volumes of short stories by Ernest Hemingway	Armchair	more
26 August 1963	Dr Reginald Jacques	The Nine Tailors and Busman's Honeymoon by Dorothy L Sayers	Music manuscript paper and pencils	more
2 September 1963	Sophie Tucker	The Conversion of Chaplain Cohen by Herbert Tarr	more	
9 September 1963	Raymond Baxter	Encyclopædia Britannica	Rodin's Danae	more
16 September 1963	Norman Del Mar	Le Petit Larousse Illustre	Piano	more
23 September 1963	Group Captain Leonard Cheshire	Breviary	Photograph of the face on the Holy Shroud at Turin	more
7 October 1963	Bernard Cribbins	Tarka the Otter by Henry Williamson	Michelangelo's Pieta	more
14 October 1963	Pat Moss	James Bond novels by Ian Fleming	Bed	more
21 October 1963	Admiral Sir Michael Maynard Denny	The Ship by Limberg	Binoculars	more
28 October 1963	Patrick Moore	The Norton Star Atlas	Telescope	more
4 November 1963	Joan Bennett	My Family and Other Animals by Gerald Durrell	Suntan lotion	more
11 November 1963	Stephen Potter	Book about sea birds and waders	Field glasses	more
18 November 1963	Gordon Pirie	Gray's Anatomy	Motor car	more
25 November 1963	Ron Grainer	Techniques and Civilization by Louis Mumford	Flame opal	more
2 December 1963	T R Robinson	Volume of illustrations of the English countryside	Marine chronometer	more
9 December 1963	Millicent Martin	The Way of Life by Laozi	Four poster bed	more
16 December 1963	Harford Montgomery Hyde	Life of Johnson by James Boswell	Brandy	more
23 December 1963	Coco the Clown	Dictionary	Writing materials	more
30 December 1963	Cyril Smith and Phyllis Sellick	Oxford Book of English Verse and Encyclopædia Britannica	Picture of their children and microphone and amplifier	more

== 1964 ==
Date	Castaway	Book	Luxury	More info
6 January 1964	Ethel Revnell	Biography of Bette Davis	Writing materials	more
13 January 1964	Leslie Baily	Anthology of poetry by Walter de la Mare	Woodworker tools	more
20 January 1964	Richard Attenborough	Biography of Mahatma Gandhi	Piano and conductor's baton	more
27 January 1964	Regina Resnik	Book with blank pages and pen	Toothbrush	more
3 February 1964	Julie Andrews	The Once and Future King by T H White	Piano	more
30 March 1964	Wilfrid Brambell	English dictionary	Scotch whisky and lager	more
6 April 1964	Sir Miles Thomas	The Second World War by Sir Winston Churchill	Toothpaste	more
13 April 1964	Stan Barstow	The Modern Short Story by H E Bates	Writing materials	more
20 April 1964	Ian Wallace	Short stories by Somerset Maugham	Guitar	more
27 April 1964	Rex Alston	Set of Wisden	Bed	more
4 May 1964	Jim Clark	At the Wheel by Jim Clark	Radio receiver	more
11 May 1964	David Kossoff	Story of the Marx Brothers	Michelangelo's David	more
18 May 1964	Dame Edith Evans	Science and Health by Mary Baker Eddy	Photographs	more
25 May 1964	David Jacobs	A Hundred-and-One Things a Girl Can Do	Piano and family photographs	more
1 June 1964	Richard Wattis	The Life of Disraeli by André Maurois	Bed	more
8 June 1964	Harry Wheatcroft	Lives by Plutarch	Rose trees	more
15 June 1964	Paul Tortelier	La Petite chronique d'Anna Magdalena Bach by Esther Meynell	Bicycle and cider	more
22 June 1964	Kenneth Connor	Margin Released by J B Priestley	Guitar	more
29 June 1964	Glen Byam Shaw	War and Peace by Leo Tolstoy	First aid kit	more
6 July 1964	Dorian Williams	Omnibus edition of Surtees	Writing materials	more
13 July 1964	Vanessa Redgrave	Anna Karenina by Leo Tolstoy	Coffee and condensed milk	more
20 July 1964	David Wynne	English translations and original Italian works by Dante Alighieri	Cocoa	more
27 July 1964	Roy MacGregor-Hastie	The Day of the Lion by Roy MacGregor-Hastie	Cigarettes	more
3 August 1964	Dick Chipperfield	Black's Veterinary Dictionary by E Boden	Cine projector and circus films	more
10 August 1964	Stephen Grenfell	The Golden Treasury by Francis Palgrave	Writing materials	more
17 August 1964	Percy Merriman	The Dictionary of National Biography	Field glasses	more
24 August 1964	Cilla Black	Alice in Wonderland by Lewis Carroll	The Mona Lisa	more
31 August 1964	Lord Thomson of Fleet	Encyclopædia Britannica	Radio receiver	more
7 September 1964	Stratford Johns	Encyclopædia Britannica	Painting by Goya	more
14 September 1964	Russell Brockbank	Navigational manual	Drawing materials	more
21 September 1964	Robbie Brightwell	The Human Situation by MacNeill Dixon	Safety razor	more
28 September 1964	Dirk Bogarde	The Swiss Family Robinson by Johann Wyss	Conversation Piece by John Singer Sargent – a painting of the Sitwells	more
5 October 1964	John Bratby	Breakdown by John Bratby	Typewriter and paper	more
12 October 1964	Jon Pertwee	The Culture of the Abdomen: A Cure of Obesity and Constipation by F A Hornibrook	Guitar	more
19 October 1964	Reverend W Awdry	Robinson Crusoe by Daniel Defoe	Writing materials	more
26 October 1964	William Douglas-Home	The collected works of William Douglas-Home	His daughter's two teddy bears	more
2 November 1964	Harry Brittain	The Natural History of Selborne by Gilbert White	Wine	more
9 November 1964	Hardie Ratcliffe	Russian grammar	Guitar	more
16 November 1964	Honor Blackman	Personal anthology of poetry	Michelangelo's David	more
23 November 1964	Frank Phillips	A Dictionary of Origins by Eric Partridge	Armchair	more
30 November 1964	Brian Epstein	Elected Origins by Thomas Merton	Painting materials	more
7 December 1964	George Malcolm	Omnibus by Evelyn Waugh	Clavichord	more
14 December 1964	Tallulah Bankhead	The Human Situation by MacNeill Dixon	Her portrait by Augustus John	more
21 December 1964	Lavinia Young	Manual of astronomy plus a bookmark with a photograph of Michelangelo's Pieta	Telescope	more
28 December 1964	John Clements	The collected works of George Bernard Shaw	Champagne	more

== 1965 ==
Date	Castaway	Book	Luxury	More info
4 January 1965	Marlene Dietrich	The Telegram and A Story of Life by Konstantin Paustovsky	Mementoes box	more
11 January 1965	Dawn Addams	Anthology of world poetry	Writing materials	more
18 January 1965	Frank Ifield	Blank book	Family photo album	more
1 February 1965	Sir Basil Spence	History of Architecture on the Comparative Method by Sir Banister Fletcher	Spaghetti	more
8 February 1965	Owen Brannigan	The collected works of G.K. Chesterton	Trombone	more
15 February 1965	Gale Pedrick	Who's Who	Writing materials	more
15 February 1965	Sir Paul Dukes	The Rubaiyat by Omar Khayyam	Soap	more
1 March 1965	Arthur Fiedler	Encyclopædia Britannica	Binoculars	more
8 March 1965	Dick Richards	Encyclopaedia	Travel itinerary	more
15 March 1965	Sir Richard Woolley	The History of the Decline and Fall of the Roman Empire by Edward Gibbon	Soap	more
22 March 1965	Bert Weedon	Gitanjali by Rabindranath Tagore	Guitar	more
29 March 1965	Anatole de Grunwald	Golfing stories by P G Wodehouse	Caviar	more
5 April 1965	George Baker	His favourite works by Charles Dickens	Writing materials	more
10 April 1965	Dr W. E. Shewell-Cooper	Bible commentary by Matthew Henry	Seeds	more
12 April 1965	Dame Margot Fonteyn	Hadrian's Memoirs by Marguerite Yourcenar	Skin diver's mask	more
19 April 1965	Al Read	Think and Grow Rich and I'll Teach You Personality	Family photo album	more
26 April 1965	Bill Shankly	The Life of Robert Burns by James Back	Football	more
3 May 1965	Sheila Hancock	The Girl Guides' Handbook	Cat food	more
10 May 1965	Hayley Mills	Roget's Thesaurus	Writing materials	more
17 May 1965	Julian Herbage	Encyclopaedia	Aladdin's lamp	more
24 May 1965	Robert Marx	Webster's Dictionary	Binoculars	more
31 May 1965	Joseph Szigeti	Lady Muraski's The Tale of Gengi by Arthur Waley	Binoculars	more
7 June 1965	Hugh Lloyd	Anthology of the works of Charles Dickens	Writing materials	more
14 June 1965	Harold Pinter	Anthology of 16th, 17th and 18th-century poetry	Writing materials	more
21 June 1965	Ginette Spanier	Notebook and pencil	Silver box	more
28 June 1965	Maxwell Knight	The Cambridge Natural History	Microscope	more
5 July 1965	Mary Stocks	The collected novels of Jane Austen	Radio receiver	more
12 July 1965	Sir Lewis Casson	No book requested	Recorder and a 1912 portrait of Dame Sybil Thorndike	more
19 July 1965	Sir William Walton	The Golden Bough by James Frazer	Small piece of sculpture	more
26 July 1965	Annie Ross	The Sun is My Undoing by Marguerite Steen	False eyelashes	more
2 August 1965	Ambrose	The Carpetbaggers by Harold Robbins	Tea bags	more
9 August 1965	Harry Corbett	The Best of Beachcomber	Trumpet	more
16 August 1965	MacDonald Hastings	Field guide to flora and fauna on the island	Handkerchiefs	more
23 August 1965	William Hartnell	English Social History by G M Trevelyan	Cigarettes	more
30 August 1965	William Connor	The Wind in the Willows by Kenneth Grahame	Pair of braces and hot water system	more
6 September 1965	Rae Jenkins	The Way of a Trout with a Fly by G E M Skues	Fly-tying materials	more
13 September 1965	Ian Hunter	The collected works of T S Eliot	Cigars	more
20 September 1965	Rita Tushingham	Plays and Prefaces by George Bernard Shaw	Albert Memorial	more
27 September 1965	Reverend David Sheppard	Volumes of reproductions of works of Dutch painters	Writing materials	more
4 October 1965	Robert Carrier	Cuisine et Vins de France by Curnonsky	Burgundy wine	more
11 October 1965	Adele Leigh	The Second World War by Sir Winston Churchill	Make-up table	more
18 October 1965	Nadia Nerina	Illustrated book on Greek mythology	Piece of sculpture	more
25 October 1965	Peter Hall	The letters of John Keats	Harpsichord	more
1 November 1965	Sir John Rothenstein	The works of Dante Aligheri	Hot water system	more
8 November 1965	Constance Shacklock	Letters of the Scattered Brotherhood by Mary Strong	Bed	more
15 November 1965	Sir Robert Mayer	Blank book and pencil	Piano	more
22 November 1965	Hildegarde	The Drill of a Soul by Pope John XXIII	Face and hand creams	more
29 November 1965	Lord Robens	The History of the Decline and Fall of the Roman Empire by Edward Gibbon	Electric razor with batteries	more
6 December 1965	John Hanson	Manual of orchestration	Piano, music manuscript paper and pencil	more
13 December 1965	General Frederick Coutts	Oxford Dictionary of Quotations	The Salvation Army crest	more
20 December 1965	Sir William Coldstream	Encyclopaedia	Paper and pencils	more
27 December 1965	Michael Flanders	Blank book and pencils	Horn	more

== 1966 ==
Date	Castaway	Book	Luxury	More info
1 January 1966	Jimmy Shand	The Second World War by Sir Winston Churchill	Tin whistle	more
3 January 1966	Professor W. E. Swinton	Whitaker's Almanac	Library	more
10 January 1966	Patience Strong	Complete Works by William Wordsworth	Indian painting showing the crucifixion	more
24 January 1966	Charlton Heston	Encyclopædia Britannica	Tennis practice equipment	more
31 January 1966	Tommy Simpson	The Pickwick Papers by Charles Dickens	Golfing equipment	more
7 February 1966	Christopher Hopper	History of England	Landscape by Constable	more
14 February 1966	Andrew Cruickshank	Journal by Søren Kierkegaard	Renoir's The Bear at the Folies Bergere	more
21 February 1966	Marie Collier	Mrs Mackintosh My Darling by Marguerite Young	Etruscan frieze of horses	more
28 February 1966	Cyril Connolly	A La Recherche du Temps Perdu by Marcel Proust	Foam rubber sleeping bag	more
7 March 1966	Bill Fraser	Italian language course	Writing materials	more
14 March 1966	Sir Frank Francis	The Duke's Children by Anthony Trollope	Golf clubs and balls	more
21 March 1966	G. O. Nickalls	Pear's Cyclopedia	Rembrandt's Titus	more
28 March 1966	Sara Leighton	Poetry by T. S. Eliot	Michelangelo's Pieta	more
4 April 1966	Hubert Gregg	History of the English-Speaking Peoples by Sir Winston Churchill	Pink champagne	more
11 April 1966	Terry Scott	French language course	Eau de Cologne	more
18 April 1966	Alan Bullock	War and Peace by Leo Tolstoy	Writing materials	more
25 April 1966	Bob & Alf Pearson	ABC Railway Timetable and History of the English-Speaking Peoples by Sir Winston Churchill	Seeds and a piano	more
2 May 1966	Lord Soper	Three Men in a Boat by Jerome K Jerome	Trombone	more
9 May 1966	Inia Te Wiata	Arts and Crafts of the Maori People by Hamilton	Painting by Michelangelo	more
16 May 1966	Henry Cooper	Do-it-yourself manual	Training gear	more
23 May 1966	Emily MacManus	Kim by Rudyard Kipling	Foam rubber mattress and mosquito net	more
30 May 1966	Bill Simpson	Songs and poems by Robert Burns	Sports equipment	more
6 June 1966	Charles Craig	Who's Who	Bed	more
13 June 1966	Nina & Frederik	The History of the Decline and Fall of the Roman Empire by Edward Gibbon	A harp and a flute	more
20 June 1966	Lilli Palmer	Faust by Johann Wolfgang von Goethe	Painting materials	more
27 June 1966	Wilfred Andrews	Press cutting albums	Painting materials	more
4 July 1966	Ninette de Valois	Poetry by W. B. Yeats	Writing materials	more
11 July 1966	Sir Stanley Rous	Virginibus Puerisque by Robert Louis Stevenson	Field glasses	more
18 July 1966	Jennifer Vyvyan	Her favourite novels by Charles Dickens	Painting equipment	more
25 July 1966	Virginia McKenna	On Playing With Lions by Bill Travers	Writing materials	more
1 August 1966	Nat Gonella	Collected short stories by Damon Runyon	Golf clubs and balls	more
8 August 1966	Michael Craig	The Wind in the Willows by Kenneth Grahame	Musical instrument	more
15 August 1966	Peter Diamand	Encyclopædia Britannica	Head of Nefertiti from the Berlin Museum	more
22 August 1966	Bryan Forbes	Cyrano de Bergerac by Edmond Rostand	Roulette wheel	more
29 August 1966	Morecambe and Wise	Encyclopædia Britannica and A History of the English-Speaking Peoples by Sir Winston Churchill	Deck chair and a ticket machine	more
5 September 1966	David Hicks	A Le Recherche du Temps Perdu by Marcel Proust	Mexican crystal skull	more
12 September 1966	Derek Oldham	Encyclopædia Britannica	Insect repellent	more
19 September 1966	June Ritchie	The Snow Goose by Paul Gallico	Onion plants	more
26 September 1966	Peter Wilson	His favourite novels by E. M. Forster	Bertholdo's Apollo	more
3 October 1966	Talbot Duckmanton	Diary by Samuel Pepys	Soap	more
10 October 1966	Katherine Whitehorn	Her favourite books by William Faulkner	Negligee	more
17 October 1966	Jacques Brunius	Complete works by Lewis Carroll	Broken and unplayable pop record	more
24 October 1966	Danny La Rue	Encyclopedia	Refrigerator	more
31 October 1966	Mitch Miller	Anthology of poetry	Oboe	more
7 November 1966	Arnold Wesker	No book	Selection of pictures	more
14 November 1966	Stephen Bishop	The Idiot by Fyodor Dostoyevsky	Piano	more
21 November 1966	Sarah Churchill	Reminisces of the early life by Sir Winston Churchill	Bath with hot water	more
28 November 1966	Anthony Burgess	Finnegans Wake by James Joyce	Music manuscript paper, pencils, and a rubber	more
5 December 1966	Captain John Ridgway & Sergent Chay Blyth	Dictionary and an anthology of poetry	Shaving kit and a leather armchair	more
12 December 1966	Leonard Cottrell	Collected works by Homer	Bronze statue of Poseidon	more
19 December 1966	Jack Brabham	Textbook on advanced mechanical engineering	None	more
24 December 1966	Gwendoline Kirby	The Lord of the Rings by J. R. R. Tolkien	Field glasses	more
26 December 1966	Georg Solti	Faust by Johann Wolfgang von Goethe	Michelangelo's The Last Judgement	more

== 1967 ==
Date	Castaway	Book	Luxury	More info
2 January 1967	Anne Sharpley	The Raft Book by Harold Gatty	Spices and Herbs	more
9 January 1967	René Cutforth	Cards of Identity by Nigel Dennis	Silk vests and pants	more
16 January 1967	Sheila Scott	In Search of the Miraculous and A New Model of the Universe by P. D. Ouspensky	Tobacco seeds	more
23 January 1967	Richard Goolden	Essays of Elia by Charles Lamb	Cigars and a dinner jacket	more
30 January 1967	Gerald Moore	Grove's Dictionary of Music and Musicians	Wine	more
6 February 1967	Renée Houston	Clochemerle by Gabriel Chevallier	Parsley	more
13 February 1967	Gerald Harper	How to Win Friends and Influence People by Dale Carnegie	Videotape or film of the full five-days' play of a Test match	more
20 February 1967	Clement Freud	Short stories by Damon Runyon	Still	more
27 February 1967	Arthur Negus	Dictionary of English Furniture by Ralph Edwards	Chippendale cabinet	more
6 March 1967	Hugh Griffith	Blank paper and pencils	Champagne	more
13 March 1967	Barry Briggs	Encyclopaedia	Surfboard	more
20 March 1967	Alan Whicker	Airways timetable	Typewriter and paper	more
27 March 1967	Dick Francis	The Spirit of St. Louis by Charles Lindbergh	Mirror	more
3 April 1967	Rolf Harris	Dusty by Frank Dalby Davison	Two tape recorders	more
10 April 1967	John Schlesinger	Gulliver's Travels by Jonathan Swift	Insect repellent	more
17 April 1967	Sir Neville Cardus	Life of Samuel Johnson by James Boswell	Watercolour painting equipment	more
24 April 1967	Eric Porter	Essays by Michel de Montaigne	Telescope or microscope	more
1 May 1967	Walter Matthews	The Republic by Plato	Beginner's guide to making rafts	more
8 May 1967	Derek Nimmo	Illustrated Encyclopaedia of Pottery and Porcelain by Geoffrey Godden	Garlic	more
15 May 1967	George Woodcock	Philosophic works by William Warren Bartley	Cornet	more
22 May 1967	John Barry	The Imitation of Christ by Thomas à Kempis	Piano	more
29 May 1967	David Ward	Collected works by Robert Burns	Painting materials	more
5 June 1967	Fenella Fielding	Cold Comfort Farm by Stella Gibbons	French silk-lined leather gloves	more
12 June 1967	Xenia Field	Encyclopaedia	Mattress	more
19 June 1967	Raymond Huntley	Cakes and Ale, The Razor's Edge and The Circle by W. Somerset Maugham	Whisky	more
26 June 1967	Peter Ritchie Calder	War and Peace by Leo Tolstoy	Tape recorder	more
3 July 1967	Roy Hudd	How to be a Comedian by Lupino Lane	Snow globe	more
10 July 1967	Henry Longhurst	Diary by Samuel Pepys	Still	more
17 July 1967	Henryk Szeryng	Essays by Michel de Montaigne	Painting by Camille Pissarro	more
24 July 1967	Tom Courtenay	Great Expectations by Charles Dickens	Football	more
31 July 1967	Heather Jenner	The Pickwick Papers, Bleak House and Martin Chuzzlewit by Charles Dickens	Golf clubs and balls	more
7 August 1967	Miriam Karlin	Dialogues by Plato	Perfume	more
14 August 1967	Jeremy Thorpe	The History of the Decline and Fall of the Roman Empire by Edward Gibbon	Violin	more
21 August 1967	Richard Briers	Plays and novels by Samuel Beckett	Piano	more
28 August 1967	Alan Bennett	Complete set of Horizon by Cyril Connolly	Unending supply of afternoon teas	more
4 September 1967	John Ogdon	Collection of Sherlock Holmes by Arthur Conan Doyle	Film projector	more
11 September 1967	Michael Hordern	Encyclopaedia	Piano	more
18 September 1967	William Warwick	Advanced book on building small boats	Case of whisky and a knife	more
25 September 1967	Doris Arnold	The Secret Garden by Frances Hodgson Burnett	Mink coat	more
2 October 1967	Roy Castle	Sounds and Scores by Henry Mancini	Piano	more
9 October 1967	André Previn	Volume of reproductions of paintings	Piano	more
16 October 1967	Kenneth Wolstenholme	Blank pages	Golf clubs and balls	more
23 October 1967	Denis Brogan	Works by Dante Alighieri	Writing materials	more
30 October 1967	Denis Matthews	The Loom of Language by Frederick Bodmer	Telescope	more
6 November 1967	Hugh Casson	Great Expectations, Nicholas Nickleby and Oliver Twist by Charles Dickens	Writing materials	more
13 November 1967	Warren Mitchell	Anthology of verse	Tenor saxophone	more
20 November 1967	Irene Worth	Textbook on anthropology	the Beatles new colour television show	more
27 November 1967	Jacques Loussier	Beasts, Men and Gods by Ferdynand Antoni Ossendowski	Crucifixion by Salvador Dalí	more
4 December 1967	Philip Clayton	Patrologiae cursus completus by Jacques Paul Migne	Pipes, tobacco, matches and a compass	more
11 December 1967	Edward Boyle	In Search of Lost Time by Marcel Proust	Drawing of a lady by Walter Sickert	more
18 December 1967	Robert Merrill	The Source by James A. Michener	Moses by Michelangelo	more
23 December 1967	Gladys Cooper	Anthology of poetry	Tape recorder	more
25 December 1967	Colin Davis	Persian dictionary	Packing case of books including a Persian dictionary	more

== 1968 ==
Date	Castaway	Book	Luxury	More info
1 January 1968	Ann Mallalieu	Collected works by Jane Austen	Four-poster bed	more
8 January 1968	Desmond Morris	The Book of the Thousand Nights and a Night by Richard Francis Burton	Snorkel mask	more
15 January 1968	John Williams	Encyclopaedia	Guitar	more
22 January 1968	John Mortimer	In Search of Lost Time by Marcel Proust	Marble bath with constant hot water	more
29 January 1968	John Bird	The Lives of the Poets by Samuel Johnson	Self-operated nuclear strike force	more
5 February 1968	Susan Hampshire	War and Peace by Leo Tolstoy	Painting or a 16th-century patch box	more
12 February 1968	Marilyn Horne	Selection of English poetry	Michelangelo's Pietà	more
19 February 1968	Bill Boorne	Other Men's Flowers by Archibald Wavell	Snooker table	more
26 February 1968	Cecil Day-Lewis	Short stories by Anton Chekhov	Bourbon whiskey	more
4 March 1968	Rosalinde Fuller	Blank pages and pencils	Full-length mirror	more
11 March 1968	Archie Camden	Books by Ernest Bramah	Radio receiver	more
18 March 1968	T. Dan Smith	Italian Townscape by Ivor de Wolfe	Block of stone	more
25 March 1968	Jon Vickers	Report to Greco by Saki	Child's ball	more
1 April 1968	Alfie Bass	Encyclopaedia		more
8 April 1968	Russell Braddon	History of the World	Red ink	more
15 April 1968	Maggie Teyte			more
22 April 1968	Sir Nicholas Sekers	In Search of Lost Time by Marcel Proust	Deckchair	more
29 April 1968	Michael Tippett	Odyssey by Homer	Harmonium	more
6 May 1968	Margaret Drabble	In Search of Lost Time by Marcel Proust	Typewriter and paper	more
13 May 1968	Leslie Sarony	Collected works by Winston Churchill	Ukulele	more
20 May 1968	Trevor Nunn	Yoga manual	Kingsize cigarette	more
27 May 1968	Janet Baker	The Lord of the Rings by J. R. R. Tolkien	Doll's house	more
3 June 1968	Sydney Gordon Russell	The Natural History of Selborne by Gilbert White	Claret	more
10 June 1968	Colin Cowdrey	Wisden that records his first tour of Australia	Box of rubber balls	more
17 June 1968	Henry Hall	Manuals to learn foreign languages	Magic lamp	more
24 June 1968	Eleanor Bron	Bi-lingual edition by Homer	Sycamore trees	more
1 July 1968	Gilbert Inglefield	A History of Western Philosophy by Bertrand Russell	Sandro Botticelli's The Mystical Nativity	more
8 July 1968	Francis Durbridge	Plays and Prefaces by George Bernard Shaw	Still Life with Oriental Rug by Henri Matisse	more
15 July 1968	Thora Hird	History of the world	Insect repellent	more
22 July 1968	Eric Shipton	The Human Situation by William Macneile Dixon	Snorkel mask	more
29 July 1968	Edward Chapman	Novels by Jane Austen	Cigarettes and whisky	more
5 August 1968	Louis Armstrong	His autobiography	Trumpet	more
12 August 1968	Francis McLean	The History of the Decline and Fall of the Roman Empire by Edward Gibbon	Dutch flower picture in the Wallace Collection	more
19 August 1968	Carlo Maria Giulini	The Mirror of Perfection – The Praise of Created Things by Francis of Assisi		more
26 August 1968	Edwige Feuillère	Anglo-French dictionary	Ivory ball	more
2 September 1968	Ngaio Marsh	Anthology of poetry	Two Chinese figures of musicians	more
9 September 1968	Richard Rodney Bennett	The Atlantic Book by Edith Sitwell	Piano	more
16 September 1968	Anne Godwin	Other Men's Flowers by Archibald Wavell	Champagne	more
23 September 1968	Marty Feldman	The Little Prince by Antoine de Saint-Exupéry	Piano	more
30 September 1968	Richard Lester	Guinness Book of Records	Harp	more
7 October 1968	Billy Russell	Encyclopaedia	Painting materials	more
14 October 1968	Raymond Postgate	The History of the Decline and Fall of the Roman Empire by Edward Gibbon	Claret	more
21 October 1968	Barbara Murray	Larousse Gastronomique	Perfume	more
28 October 1968	Richard Baker	Novels by Jane Austen	Bed	more
4 November 1968	Peggy Mount	Complete works by Oscar Wilde	Enormous cookery book	more
11 November 1968	Dan Maskell	Books by Henry Longhurst	Tennis balls, golf balls, pencil and paper	more
13 November 1968	Paul Gore-Booth	Books by Mary Baker Eddy	Piano	more
18 November 1968	C. H. Jaeger	Anthology of modern British poetry	Chess set	more
25 November 1968	Sandy Powell	My Autobiography by Charlie Chaplin	Violin	more
9 December 1968	Des Wilson	Robinson Crusoe by Daniel Defoe	Typewriter and paper	more
16 December 1968	Asa Briggs	The History of the Decline and Fall of the Roman Empire by Edward Gibbon	BBC Archives from 1945 to 1954	more
23 December 1968	Arthur Askey	Golf instruction book	Golf clubs and balls	more
25 December 1968	Rosea Kemp	Enquire Within Upon Everything	Four-poster bed	more
30 December 1968	Bob Braithwaite	The Second World War by Winston Churchill	Piano	more

== 1969 ==
Date	Castaway	Book	Luxury	More info
6 January 1969	Heather Harper	Encyclopaedia	Knitting wool and needles	more
13 January 1969	Alan Pegler	Complete Sherlock Holmes by Arthur Conan Doyle	Insect repellent	more
20 January 1969	Maurice Jacobson	Paperback detective stories	Caviar	more
27 January 1969	Maggie Fitzgibbon	The Birdman of Alcatraz by Robert Stroud	Alabaster cherub	more
3 February 1969	Lord David Cecil	War and Peace by Leo Tolstoy	Donatello's great altar in Basilica of Saint Anthony of Padua	more
12 February 1969	Hylda Baker	Gone with the Wind by Margaret Mitchell	Family photograph album	more
17 February 1969	Edward Downes	Encyclopaedia	Chinese language course	more
24 February 1969	Angus Wilson	Volume on mathematical logic	Champagne	more
3 March 1969	Zena Skinner	The Second World War by Winston Churchill	Tape recorder	more
10 March 1969	Mary Wilson	Wuthering Heights by Emily Brontë	Make-up set, mirror and comb	more
17 March 1969	L. Marsland Gander	Encyclopaedia	Telescope	more
24 March 1969	Lady Diana Cooper	Volumes of her autobiography	Bag of pillows, in which she will smuggle in her dog	more
31 March 1969	Jill Bennett	Three Sisters by Anton Chekhov	Perfume	more
7 April 1969	Alec Rose	History of England	Radio receiver	more
14 April 1969	Hetty King	History of the world	Parrot	more
21 April 1969	Mary Stewart	Encyclopaedia	Paper and pencils	more
28 April 1969	Elsie Hall	War and Peace by Leo Tolstoy	Billiard table, cue and balls	more
5 May 1969	Alvar Lidell	Oxford English Dictionary	Playing cards	more
12 May 1969	Nicolai Gedda	The Brothers Karamazov and The Idiot by Fyodor Dostoyevsky	Rubber mattress	more
19 May 1969	Virginia Wade	Mrs Beeton's Book of Household Management	Writing and sketching materials	more
26 May 1969	Ginger Rogers	Science and Health with Key to the Scriptures by Mary Baker Eddy	Painting equipment	more
2 June 1969	Antonia Fraser	Aeneid by Virgil	Typewriter and paper	more
9 June 1969	Stanford Robinson	Grove's Dictionary of Music and Musicians	Radio receiver	more
16 June 1969	John Trevelyan	Airways timetable	Piano	more
23 June 1969	Evelyn Laye	A Treatise on White Magic by Alice Bailey	Cosmetics	more
30 June 1969	Kenneth More	The History of the Decline and Fall of the Roman Empire by Edward Gibbon	Mattress	more
7 July 1969	Leonard Henry	Thesaurus	Piano	more
14 July 1969	Vincent Price	Leaves of Grass by Walt Whitman	Double bed	more
21 July 1969	Peter Pears	Tropical Plants and Their Cultivation by Louis Bruggeman	Bed	more
28 July 1969	Rachael Heyhoe Flint	Book on desert island cookery	Ukulele	more
4 August 1969	Cyril Harmer	The Second World War by Winston Churchill	Centrally-heated sleeping bag	more
11 August 1969	Stanley Rubinstein	Survey of London by John Stow	Family photograph album	more
18 August 1969	Hermione Gingold	Mrs Beeton's Book of Household Management	Barrel of lipstick	more
25 August 1969	Olivia Manning	On Growth and Form by D'Arcy Wentworth Thompson	Clue to buried treasure	more
1 September 1969	Des O'Connor	Encyclopaedia	Daily delivery of The Sporting Life	more
8 September 1969	Robin Day	The Oxford Dictionary of Quotations	Champagne	more
13 September 1969	Donald Zec	The Wallet of Kai Lung by Ernest Bramah	Ice cream machine	more
20 September 1969	Sir John Wolfenden	War and Peace by Leo Tolstoy	Tape recorder	more
27 September 1969	Cliff Morgan	Teach-yourself encyclopaedia	Piano	more
4 October 1969	Thea Holme	Works by Beatrix Potter	Writing and painting materials	more
11 October 1969	Henry Williamson	The Story of My Heart by Richard Jefferies	Cor anglais	more
18 October 1969	Max Adrian	Blank pages and pencils	Tapestry-making materials	more
25 October 1969	Raymond Mays	Gaiety, Theatre of Enchantment by W. J. MacQueen-Pope	Umbrella	more
1 November 1969	Anthony Grey	Dictionary	Book stall in London Victoria station	more
8 November 1969	Evelyn Rothwell	Encyclopaedia	Writing materials	more
15 November 1969	Dudley Moore	Study of psychology	Piano	more
22 November 1969	Irmgard Seefried	Herr, Hier Bin Ich (Prayers of Life)	String of pearls	more
29 November 1969	Lillian Board	Family photograph album	Bed	more
6 December 1969	Godfrey Baseley	Royal Horticultural Society Dictionary	Bed	more
13 December 1969	Moira Anderson	Scouting for Boys by Robert Baden-Powell	Bathroom suite	more
20 December 1969	Bernard Montgomery	His own book A Concise History of Warfare	Piano	more
27 December 1969	Tommy Steele	Dictionary of Word and Phrase	Sports car	more

== 1970 ==
Date	Castaway	Book	Luxury	More info
3 January 1970	Fyfe Robertson	General Semantics	Cello	more
10 January 1970	Leonard Sachs	David Copperfield by Charles Dickens	Radio receiver	more
17 January 1970	Val Doonican	Big Anthology	Guitar	more
24 January 1970	Alan S. C. Ross	A Course of Modern Analysis by E. T. Whittaker	Television set	more
31 January 1970	Stanley Baxter	Memoirs by Louis de Rouvroy	Koh-i-Noor diamond	more
7 February 1970	Isidore Godfrey	Symphony scores by Pyotr Ilyich Tchaikovsky	Piano	more
14 February 1970	Frank Gillard	Naturalist's guide	Set of lenses	more
21 February 1970	Richard Church	Oxford English Dictionary	Writing materials	more
28 February 1970	Isobel Baillie	Our Hearts Were Young and Gay by Cornelia Otis Skinner	Guitar	more
7 March 1970	Roy Strong	Larousse Gastronomique by Prosper Montagné	Johannes Vermeer's View of Delft	more
14 March 1970	Richard Chamberlain	Oxford Book of English Verse	Painting materials	more
21 March 1970	Judy Hashman	Anthology of English Verse	Stamp album	more
28 March 1970	Nyree Dawn Porter	The Thurber Carnival by James Thurber	Umbrella	more
4 April 1970	Sheridan Russell	The Imitation of Christ by Thomas à Kempis	Cello	more
11 April 1970	Deryck Guyler	Hannibal by Theodore Ayrault Dodge	Roman helmet in the British Museum	more
18 April 1970	James Lockhart	Collected works by John Donne	Piano	more
25 April 1970	Gavin de Beer	Small Talk at Wreyland by Cecil Torr	Typewriter	more
2 May 1970	Gina Cigna	Le Crime de Sylvestre Bonnard by Anatole France	Piano	more
9 May 1970	Carol Channing	My Life in Art by Constantin Stanislavski	Writing materials	more
16 May 1970	Graham Usher	Collected works by Beatrix Potter	Winged Victory of Samothrace in Musée du Louvre	more
23 May 1970	Andy Stewart	Collected works by Robert Burns	Writing materials	more
30 May 1970	Keith Michell	I Ching	Painting materials	more
6 June 1970	Monica Dickens	Roget's Thesaurus	Writing materials	more
13 June 1970	Barbara Windsor	History of Great Britain	Hair pieces	more
20 June 1970	Ida Haendel	Survival manual	Writing materials	more
27 June 1970	Vidal Sassoon	Thesaurus	Piece of sculpture by Baracal	more
4 July 1970	Robin Knox-Johnston	The Outline of History by H. G. Wells	Writing materials	more
11 July 1970	Barbara Cartland	The Knave of Hearts by Louise Saunders	Makeup box	more
18 July 1970	John Piper	Ulysses by James Joyce	Pillow	more
25 July 1970	Joan Hammond	Oxford English Dictionary	Toothbrush and toothpaste	more
1 August 1970	Terry-Thomas	His book Filling the Gap	Brandy	more
8 August 1970	David Davis	Religio Medici by Thomas Browne	Pipes and tobacco	more
15 August 1970	Erich Leinsdorf	Goethe's Faust	Insect repellent	more
22 August 1970	Freya Stark	Encyclopædia Britannica 1911 Edition	Bath with a hot-water system	more
29 August 1970	Dick Emery	A Christmas Carol by Charles Dickens	Bed	more
5 September 1970	Ellen Pollock	Collected works by George Bernard Shaw	Her husband's painting of their son	more
12 September 1970	Helen Watts	Illustrated book on gardening	Diego Velázquez's Las Meninas	more
19 September 1970	A. P. Herbert	Collected works by Charles Dickens	Binoculars	more
26 September 1970	Harry Carpenter	Encyclopædia Britannica	Guitar	more
3 October 1970	Carrie Tubb	The Oxford Dictionary of Quotations	Parasol	more
10 October 1970	Lynn Redgrave	The Pumpkin Eater by Penelope Mortimer	Excerpt from the BBC recording Just William	more
17 October 1970	Sári Barabás	Works by Leo Slezak	Knitting needles and wool	more
24 October 1970	John Lill	Modern Chess Openings	Piano	more
31 October 1970	Joan Whittington	Law study course	Radio receiver	more
7 November 1970	Vilém Tauský	Encyclopedia	Watch	more
14 November 1970	Margaret Powell	The History of the Decline and Fall of the Roman Empire by Edward Gibbon	Tahitian language course	more
21 November 1970	David Hughes	Walden by Henry David Thoreau	Golf clubs and balls	more
28 November 1970	Diana Rigg	Primary Instruction in all languages	Vegetable garden	more
5 December 1970	Wally Herbert	Anthology of World Poetry		more
12 December 1970	Arthur Lowe	Book on tropical plants	Claret (a dozen cases)	more
19 December 1970	Ivan Mauger	Survival manual	Box of family photographs	more
26 December 1970	Quentin Poole	Novels by Agatha Christie	Flute and music	more
