= List of Desert Island Discs episodes =

The BBC Radio 4 programme Desert Island Discs invites castaways to choose eight pieces of music, a book (in addition to the Bible – or a religious text appropriate to that person's beliefs – and the Complete Works of Shakespeare) and a luxury item that they would take to an imaginary desert island, where they will be marooned indefinitely. The rules state that the chosen luxury item must not be anything animate or indeed anything that enables the castaway to escape from the island, for instance a radio set, sailing yacht or aeroplane. The choices of book and luxury can sometimes give insight into the guest's life, and the choices of guests are listed here.

Very rarely, programmes will be repeated in place of new shows as a tribute to former guests who have recently died – for example Radio 4 repeated Humphrey Lyttelton's show, originally aired on 5 November 2006, on 15 June 2008. Desert Island Discs takes two short breaks, in April and August/September. BBC Radio 4 broadcasts new programmes for approximately 42 weeks each year on Sunday mornings, usually with a repeat transmission five days later. On Remembrance Sunday (in November) the programme is not broadcast but that week's programme gets a single airing in the Friday repeat slot.

From mid-2011 selected episodes have been re-broadcast on BBC Radio 4 Extra and also on BBC6 Music. The episodes on BBC Radio 4 Extra have included some 60-minute versions of the show; many of these open with additional lead-in and lead-outs from presenter Kirsty Young, often featuring sections of other interview footage or recordings featuring the guest of the episode in question. Some, but not all, of these extended versions, also feature extended in-programme material not used on the original broadcast. Episodes repeated on BBC6 are those concerning musicians and figures in the music industry.

- 1942–1946: List of Desert Island Discs episodes (1942–1946)
- 1951–1960: List of Desert Island Discs episodes (1951–1960)
- 1961–1970: List of Desert Island Discs episodes (1961–1970)
- 1971–1980: List of Desert Island Discs episodes (1971–1980)
- 1981–1990: List of Desert Island Discs episodes (1981–1990)
- 1991–2000: List of Desert Island Discs episodes (1991–2000)
- 2001–2010: List of Desert Island Discs episodes (2001–2010)
- 2011–2020: List of Desert Island Discs episodes (2011–2020)
- 2021–present: List of Desert Island Discs episodes (2021–present)
