= List of Desert Island Discs episodes (1981–1990) =

The BBC Radio 4 programme Desert Island Discs invites castaways to choose eight pieces of music, a book (in addition to the Bible – or a religious text appropriate to that person's beliefs – and the Complete Works of Shakespeare) and a luxury item that they would take to an imaginary desert island, where they will be marooned indefinitely. The rules state that the chosen luxury item must not be anything animate or indeed anything that enables the castaway to escape from the island, for instance a radio set, sailing yacht or aeroplane. The choices of book and luxury can sometimes give insight into the guest's life, and the choices of guests between 1981 and 1990 are listed here.

== 1981 ==
Date	Castaway	Book	Luxury	More info
3 January 1981	Robin Cousins	Shōgun by James Clavell	Marzipan	more
10 January 1981	John Fowles	Dictionary of National Biography	Field glasses	more
17 January 1981	Princess Margaret	War and Peace by Leo Tolstoy	Piano	more
24 January 1981	Joan Plowright	Three novels by Aldous Huxley	Piano	more
31 January 1981	Jeffrey Archer	Reunion by Fred Uhlman	Plasticine model of Roy Plomley and a pin	more
7 February 1981	Mary O'Hara	The Lord of the Rings by J. R. R. Tolkien	Tennis practice equipment	more
14 February 1981	David Broome	Collected Speeches by Winston Churchill	Wine	more
21 February 1981	Frederic Raphael	Bilingual edition of poetry by Giorgos Seferis	Painting materials	more
28 February 1981	Carla Lane	Dictionary of quotations	French Shampoo	more
7 March 1981	Daniel Massey	Ego by James Agate	Wine	more
14 March 1981	Peter Nichols	Collected essays by George Orwell	Vibraphone	more
21 March 1981	Russell Harty	A History of Craven by Thomas Dunham Whitaker	Flagpole and Union Jack	more
28 March 1981	Patricia Ruanne	The Lord of the Rings by J. R. R. Tolkien	Sunglasses	more
4 April 1981	Gary Glitter	Times Concise Atlas	Elastoplast	more
11 April 1981	Sir Fitzroy Maclean	War and Peace by Leo Tolstoy	Writing materials	more
18 April 1981	Princess Grace of Monaco	Plays by George Kelly	Pillow	more
25 April 1981	Stewart Granger	Collected works by Ernest Hemingway	Gold statuette of Winston Churchill	more
2 May 1981	Sir Frederick Ashton	In Search of Lost Time by Marcel Proust	Cards	more
9 May 1981	Buddy Rich	Story of O by Pauline Réage	Ferrari	more
16 May 1981	John Gielgud	In Search of Lost Time by Marcel Proust		more
23 May 1981	Edmund Rubbra	Winnie-the-Pooh by A. A. Milne	Music manuscript paper	more
30 May 1981	Eric Shilling	Collin's Albatross Book of Verse by Louis Untermeyer	Astronomical telescope	more
6 June 1981	William Whitelaw	The World That Fred Made by Bernard Darwin	Bath with a hot water system	more
13 June 1981	Richard Leakey	Touch the Earth by T. C. McLuhan	Pillow	more
20 June 1981	Giuseppe Di Stefano	Maria by Arianna Stassinopoulos	Roulette table	more
27 June 1981	Morris West	Meditations Upon Our Human Condition by John Donne	Pencils and paper	more
4 July 1981	Gloria Swanson	The Prophet by Kahlil Gibran	Telephone	more
11 July 1981	Gillian Lynne	French language course	Eyelash curler	more
18 July 1981	Carl Sagan	Boy Scout handbook	Reflecting telescope	more
25 July 1981	Roger Moore	Noble House by James Clavell	Video player and films of family	more
1 August 1981	Julian Lloyd Webber	History of Leyton Orient F.C.	Cello	more
8 August 1981	Terry Hands	Dictionary	Cello	more
15 August 1981	Sebastian Coe	The Penguin Dorothy Parker by Dorothy Parker	Bed	more
22 August 1981	Paul Eddington	Experiences of an Irish R.M. by Martin Ross	Boathouse at Dawn by Ivon Hitchens	more
29 August 1981	Frank Oz	Complete works by Emily Dickinson	Clean sheets	more
5 September 1981	Alan Jones	Eagle in the Sky by Wilbur Smith	Australian lager	more
12 September 1981	Jessye Norman	The Diary of Virginia Woolf	Perrier water	more
19 September 1981	Malcolm Muggeridge	Writings by Samuel Johnson	Beehive	more
26 September 1981	James Mason	Ada by Vladimir Nabokov	Guitar	more
3 October 1981	Beaux Arts Trio	Books about gardening, painting and boat handling	Violin and strings and piano	more
10 October 1981	Montserrat Caballé		Record box	more
17 October 1981	Elspeth Huxley	Novels by P. G. Wodehouse	Camera and film	more
24 October 1981	Joseph Cotten	Gardening manual	Boat building book	more
31 October 1981	Patrick Lichfield	Book with blank cork pages	Astronomical telescope	more
7 November 1981	Glyn Daniel	Brewer's Dictionary of Phrase and Fable	Wine	more
14 November 1981	James Clavell	Koran		more
21 November 1981	Diana Dors	Her autobiography	Chocolates	more
28 November 1981	Douglas Bader	Complete works by Alfred, Lord Tennyson	Sand iron and golf balls	more
5 December 1981	Alan Howard	Piano manual	Piano	more
12 December 1981	Jack Higgins	Four Quartets by T. S. Eliot	Writing materials	more
19 December 1981	Helene Hanff	Memoirs by Louis de Rouvroy	Scrabble	more
26 December 1981	The Earl of Harewood	Anthology of poetry	Typewriter	more

== 1982 ==
Date	Castaway	Book	Luxury	More info
2 January 1982	Trevor Brooking	Crossword puzzles and pencils	Golf clubs and balls	more
9 January 1982	Martin Gilbert	The document volumes of the Churchill biography by Martin Gilbert	Drawings of his two children	more
16 January 1982	Angela Rippon	Pride and Prejudice by Jane Austen	Watercolours. brushes and paper	more
23 January 1982	Frankie Howerd	David Copperfield by Charles Dickens	Cross given to him by his mother	more
30 January 1982	Paul McCartney	Linda's Pictures by Linda McCartney	Guitar	more
6 February 1982	Professor J K Galbraith	Personally compiled anthology	Typewriter and paper	more
13 February 1982	Sir Christopher Leaver	Grove's Dictionary of Music and Musicians	Wine cellar	more
20 February 1982	Petula Clark	The short stories of John Steinbeck	Piano	more
27 February 1982	John Osborne	Holy Living and Holy Dying by Jeremy Taylor	Piano and an instruction book	more
6 March 1982	Dame Eva Turner	Inferno by Dante Alighieri	Castanets	more
13 March 1982	George Chisholm	The novels of P. G. Wodehouse	Engraved glass and supply of bitter lemon	more
20 March 1982	Lord Bernard Miles	The Odyssey by Homer	Box of notebooks, pencils and sharpeners	more
27 March 1982	Sir William Walton	The Education of a Gardener by Russell Page	Funicular for hills	more
3 April 1982	Richard Armstrong	Piano Sonatas by Beethoven	Piano	more
10 April 1982	Julia McKenzie	Act One by Moss Hart	Painting materials	more
17 April 1982	Brian Aldiss	Rasselas by Dr Samuel Johnson	Time machine	more
24 April 1982	Dorothy Dunnett	The History of the Decline and Fall of the Roman Empire by Edward Gibbon	Guitar	more
1 May 1982	Jenny Agutter	The Oxford Book of English Verse	Oriental rug	more
8 May 1982	Lucia Popp	The Magic Mountain by Thomas Mann	Teddy bear	more
15 May 1982	Julian Symons	Bleak House by Charles Dickens	Couch	more
22 May 1982	Marti Webb	Illustrated dictionary	Piano	more
29 May 1982	Desmond Hawkins	Field guide to the birds of the island	Binoculars	more
5 June 1982	Delia Smith	The autobiography of Saint Therese of Lisieux	Writing materials	more
12 June 1982	Sir Anton Dolin	Friends and Memories by Sir Anton Dolin	Electric razor	more
19 June 1982	Eric Newby	Dictionary of National Biography	Whisky	more
26 June 1982	Joss Ackland	Dictionary	Video player with cassettes of old movies	more
3 July 1982	John Mortimer	The Oxford Book of English Verse	Bath	more
10 July 1982	Captain Jacques Cousteau	Essays by Michel de Montaigne	Stone from the stomach of a fossilised dinosaur	more
17 July 1982	Pamela Stephenson	Buddhist scripture by Dama Pada	Television set with satellite link-up	more
24 July 1982	Lyall Watson	Pears Cyclopaedia	Film projector and 20 western films	more
31 July 1982	George Martin	Manual on practical engineering	Clavichord	more
7 August 1982	Dame Janet Baker	Persuasion by Jane Austen	Pencils and paper	more
14 August 1982	Donald Sinden	A History of Architecture on the Comparative Method by Sir Banister Fletcher	His favourite picture in the Walker Art Gallery	more
21 August 1982	Carl Davis	The short stories of Anton Chekhov	Shampoo	more
28 August 1982	Duke and Duchess of Devonshire	The books of Beatrix Potter and Chambers' Biographical Dictionary	New potatoes and aftershave	more
4 September 1982	Claire Bloom	À la recherche du temps perdu by Marcel Proust	Coffee and espresso machine	more
11 September 1982	James Loughran	Comprehensive world airways timetable	Drawing and painting equipment	more
18 September 1982	Carlo Curley	Cookery book by Julia Child	Pipe organ	more
25 September 1982	Wilbur Smith	The Oxford English Dictionary	Brass bedstead and feather mattress	more
2 October 1982	David Lloyd Jones	The Journal of Edmond de Goncourt	—	more
9 October 1982	N.Busch, J.Kuchmy, M.Parry, M.Wilson	Books by Hector Berlioz, Charles Dickens, Hugh Johnson and a cookery book	Razor and shaving soap, a video player with a tape of Laurel & Hardy, wine and a violin	more
16 October 1982	Geoffrey Grigson	The Oxford English Dictionary	Pate de foie gras	more
23 October 1982	Mike Harding	The New Oxford Book of English Verse	Ordnance Survey maps and set of books about the Fells	more
30 October 1982	Lord Tonypandy	The Methodist hymn book	Writing materials	more
6 November 1982	Thomas Allen	Jane Eyre by Charlotte Brontë	Golf clubs and balls	more
13 November 1982	Rosamond Lehmann	The letters of the Marquise de Sevigne	Writing materials	more
20 November 1982	P D James	Middlemarch by George Eliot	Claret	more
27 November 1982	Helen Mirren	The Bhagavad Gita	Silk underwear	more
4 December 1982	Alan Price	The Wind in the Willows by Kenneth Grahame	Piano	more
18 December 1982	György Ligeti	Alice in Wonderland by Lewis Carroll	The Garden Of Earthly Delights by Hieronymus Bosch	more
25 December 1982	Mary Ellis	Encyclopaedia	Writing materials	more

== 1983 ==
Date	Castaway	Book	Luxury	More info
1 January 1983	Rachel Billington	Anna Karenina by Leo Tolstoy	Writing materials	more
8 January 1983	Steve Davis	The Throwback and Wilt by Tom Sharpe	Snooker table	more
15 January 1983	Baroness Maria von Trapp	True funny stories in German	Statue of Madonna and Child, 17th Century	more
22 January 1983	Gwyneth Jones	The Prophet by Kahlil Gibran	Piano with bath salts	more
29 January 1983	Tim Severin	Pax Britannica by Jan Morris	Herb garden	more
5 February 1983	Beryl Reid	Forever Amber by Kathleen Winsor	Silk garment	more
12 February 1983	Zandra Rhodes	Mrs Beeton's Household Management	Sketchbook, pens and pencils	more
19 February 1983	James Ivory	À la recherche du temps perdu by Marcel Proust	Shower with hot water	more
26 February 1983	Tom Keating	Lives of the Artists by Giorgio Vasari	Mattock	more
5 March 1983	Kenneth Macmillan	The Rack by A E Ellis	Godiva chocolates from Belgium	more
12 March 1983	Douglas Reeman	The Admiralty Seamanship Manual	Orchid-growing kit	more
19 March 1983	Michael Wood	Other Men's Flowers by Lord Wavell	Pair of field glasses	more
26 March 1983	Jan Morris	Her own book on Venice	Astronomical telescope with 'Catalogue of Nebulae'	more
2 April 1983	James Fox	Colour reproduction of Renaissance artists	Watercolour equipment	more
9 April 1983	Ruggiero Ricci	The letters of Beethoven	The Plowden Guarneri violin	more
16 April 1983	Geoffrey Moorhouse	The Dictionary of National Biography	Recording of curlews and Indian spices	more
23 April 1983	Max Boyce	I Can't Stay Long by Laurie Lee	Oil-painting equipment	more
30 April 1983	A N Wilson	The Golden Treasuary by Francis Palgrave	Bed and blankets	more
7 May 1983	Arthur English	Britain's Heritage by John Julius Norwich	Weekend in Paris	more
14 May 1983	Alan King-Hamilton	Barclay's World of Cricket by Jim Swanton	Television set	more
21 May 1983	Terry Wogan	His favourite books by P G Wodehouse	Vodka	more
28 May 1983	Sinéad Cusack	The novels of John le Carré	Writing materials	more
4 June 1983	Raymond Briggs	The Complete Works of Beachcomber	Billiard table with snooker balls and cue	more
11 June 1983	Sir Peter Pears	A book by E M Forster	Painting from his collection	more
18 June 1983	Fleur Cowles	Blank paper	Painting materials	more
25 June 1983	Peter Maxwell Davies	Ulysses by James Joyce	Music manuscript paper and pens	more
2 July 1983	Terry Jones	The Complete Works of Geoffrey Chaucer	Pencil and paper	more
9 July 1983	Julian Bream	—	—	more
16 July 1983	Sir John Pritchard	Lucia novels by E. F. Benson	Italian wine	more
23 July 1983	John Gunter	The Complete Works of Flann O'Brien	More William Walton records	more
30 July 1983	Keith Waterhouse	A year's supply of the Exchange & Mart	Solar-powered television, video and eight films	more
6 August 1983	Sir Frederick Gibberd	Scrapbook of poetry	Bottle of sleeping tablets	more
13 August 1983	Peter Bull	Brideshead Revisited (in Greek) by Evelyn Waugh	Crystal ball	more
20 August 1983	Malcolm Bradbury	If on a Winter's Night a Traveller by Italo Calvino	Word processor	more
27 August 1983	Cindy Buxton and Annie Price	A book on explorers and Johnny Livingstone's Seagull by Richard Bach	Cow and a box of soap	more
3 September 1983	Paul Jones	Political works and music criticism by George Bernard Shaw	Harmonica	more
10 September 1983	Charlotte Lamb	Pride and Prejudice by Jane Austen	Typewriter and paper	more
17 September 1983	Lionel Hampton	Science and Health by Mary Baker Eddy	Tape recorder	more
24 September 1983	Ian Richardson	Book of quotations	Large supply of paper and pencils	more
1 October 1983	Rosemary Sutcliff	Kim by Rudyard Kipling	Flowers delivered daily by bottle	more
8 October 1983	Mollie Harris	The five-volume works by Anthony Wood	Union Jack	more
15 October 1983	Topol	Great Treasury of Western Thought by Mortimer J Adler	Artist's kit	more
22 October 1983	Linda Esther Gray	Anthology of poetry	Garlic, chocolate and wine	more
29 October 1983	Sir Ranulph Fiennes	The Oxford Dictionary of Quotations	Tube of Antisan cream	more
5 November 1983	Shirley MacLaine	Dictionary and hexalingual thesaurus	Blank paper	more
12 November 1983	Sir Peter Hall	The New Grove Dictionary of Music and Musicians	Photograph of his children	more
19 November 1983	Sir Hugh Greene	The Penguin Complete Sherlock Holmes by Sir Arthur Conan Doyle	Portable typewriter and much paper	more
26 November 1983	Thomas Keneally	Oxford Book of 20th Century English Verse by Philip Larkin	Collection of The Times crosswords	more
3 December 1983	Marvin Hamlisch	Phone book	Picture of his mother when she was 17	more
10 December 1983	John Piper	The Complete Works of William Blake	Pianola	more
17 December 1983	James Stewart	Robinson Crusoe by Daniel Defoe	Family photo album	more
31 December 1983	M M Kaye	Indian Tales by Rudyard Kipling	Writer's kit	more

== 1984 ==
Date	Castaway	Book	Luxury	More info
7 January 1984	Bertice Reading	The Prophet by Kahlil Gibran	King size brass bed with mattress	more
14 January 1984	David Gower	Compendium of wines	Video cassettes of Rumpole of the Bailey	more
21 January 1984	Quentin Crewe	Brewer's Dictionary of Phrase and Fable	Potter's wheel	more
28 January 1984	Princess Michael of Kent	Histories by Herodotus	Cat	more
4 February 1984	Stubby Kaye	His diary	Hard hat	more
11 February 1984	Lord Elwyn-Jones	English Social History by G M Trevelyan	Comic collage by Pearl Binder	more
18 February 1984	Woody Herman	Music is My Mistress by Duke Ellington	Jaguar XJ6	more
25 February 1984	Michael York	No book chosen	Telescope	more
3 March 1984	Gerald Priestland	The poetry of Gerard Manley Hopkins	Air conditioner	more
10 March 1984	Don McCullin	One year of issues of The Times	Mirror	more
17 March 1984	Michael Quinn	Le Repertoire de la Cuisine by Louis Saulnier	Pair of waterwings	more
24 March 1984	Honest Ed Mirvish	Complete Webster's English Dictionary	Barbecue	more
31 March 1984	Paul Tortelier	The Cathedrals of France by Auguste Rodin	Photograph of his wife	more
7 April 1984	Christopher Reeve	The Inner Reality by Paul Brunton	Scuba-diving equipment	more
14 April 1984	Lucy Irvine	Language Made Plain by Anthony Burgess	Mosquito coils and an apple pip	more
21 April 1984	David Lodge	Ulysses by James Joyce	Nymph in a Landscape by Palma Vecchio	more
28 April 1984	Leo McKern	Encyclopaedia	Watercolours and hot-pressed paper	more
5 May 1984	Rosalind Plowright	The collected works of William Wordsworth	Windsurfer	more
12 May 1984	Hugh Johnson	The Complete Works of P G Wodehouse	Writing materials and many bottles	more
30 June 1984	Zubin Mehta	The Gathas by Zarathustra	Van Eyck's Triptych from Ghent Cathedral	more
7 July 1984	Lord Rothschild	Book on pure mathematics	Pad of A4 paper	more
14 July 1984	Vlado Perlemuter	The Complete Plays of Molière	Painting of Louvre	more
21 July 1984	Natalia Makarova	The poetry of Aleksandr Pushkin	Wine – Chateau Margot 1961	more
28 July 1984	Sir Alfred Ayer	The Life of Johnson and A Journal of a Tour to the Hebrides by James Boswell	Le Moulin de la Galette by Renoir	more
4 August 1984	Gayatri Devi	Omnibus of books by James Heriot	Can of insect repellent	more
11 August 1984	Ron Goodwin	The Prophet by Kahlil Gibran	Tuba	more
18 August 1984	William Rushton	Anthology by G K Chesterton	Piano	more
25 August 1984	Ved Mehta	11th edition of Encyclopædia Britannica	No luxury chosen	more
1 September 1984	George Abbott	Encyclopaedia	Writing paper	more
8 September 1984	Catherine Cookson	Her own autobiography	Piano	more
15 September 1984	Gerry Cottle	I Love You, Honey, but the Season's Over by Connie Clausen	Juggling clubs	more
22 September 1984	Alfred Eisenstadt	A book of quotations	Camera	more
29 September 1984	John Hurt	The Complete Works of Lewis Carroll	Pillow	more
6 October 1984	John Surman	Set of Wisden	Vat of Bordeaux wine	more
19 October 1984	Michael Ffolkes	—	—	more
20 October 1984	Jonathan Lynn	Collection of Jeeves & Wooster novels by P G Wodehouse	Pen and paper	more
27 October 1984	David Rendall	The Prophet by Kahlil Gibran	Wine – Chateau Lascombes 1966	more
3 November 1984	Tom Sharpe	Oxford Book of English Verse	Ton of snuff	more
10 November 1984	Vernon Handley	The Principles of Art by R. G. Collingwood	Sodastream and gas cylinders	more
17 November 1984	David Puttnam	The Wisden Anthology of Cricket by Benny Green	Goose down pillow	more
24 November 1984	Robin Hanbury-Tenison	The Oxford Companion to English Literature	Cask of claret	more
1 December 1984	Miklós Rózsa	Collected Poems of Endre Ady	Manuscript paper and pens	more
8 December 1984	Sir John Burgh	Encyclopædia Britannica	Transistor radio	more
15 December 1984	Ray Cooney	—	—	more

== 1985 ==
Date	Castaway	Book	Luxury	More info
5 January 1985	Sir Michael Tippett	Blank pages	Egg timer	more
12 January 1985	Tom Stoppard	Inferno (in two languages) by Dante Alighieri	Plastic football	more
19 January 1985	John Harvey-Jones	The Loom of Language by Frederick Bodmer	Trap (minus donkey)	more
26 January 1985	Madhur Jaffrey	Blank book	Whiskey	more
2 February 1985	Julie Walters	The Magus by John Fowles	Telephone	more
9 February 1985	Elly Ameling	The poetry of Paul Verlaine	Buddha statue	more
16 February 1985	Michael Elkins	The Hero With a Thousand Faces by Joseph Campbell	Electric typewriter	more
23 February 1985	Anthony Hopkins	The Great Gatsby by F. Scott Fitzgerald	Piano	more
2 March 1985	Jorge Bolet	Don Quixote by Miguel de Cervantes	Camera	more
9 March 1985	Alison Lurie	Oxford Book of English Verse	Telephone	more
16 March 1985	Gordon Beningfield	Manual on how to swim	Sketchbook, paints and pencils	more
23 March 1985	Richard Eyre	Partridge's Dictionary of Slang	Saxophone	more
30 March 1985	Jimmy Savile	Mail order catalogue	Havana cigar	more
6 April 1985	Doris Stokes	The Complete Andy Capp	Photograph album of family, friends and pets	more
13 April 1985	Joseph Allen	A number of Sherlock Holmes novels by Sir Arthur Conan Doyle	Family pocket watch	more
20 April 1985	Robert Burchfield	—	—	more
27 April 1985	Barbara Taylor Bradford	Wuthering Heights by Emily Brontë	Family photograph album	more
4 May 1985	David Steel MP	Do-it-yourself manual	Cathedral organ	more
11 May 1985	Sheila Steafel	Dictionary	Artist's equipment	more

== 1986 ==
Date	Castaway	Book	Luxury	More info
5 January 1986	Alan Parker	The collected poems of Sir John Betjeman	Suntan lotion	more
12 January 1986	Nigel Kennedy	Wisden Almanack	Violin	more
19 January 1986	Maureen Lipman	The collected works of Jane Austen	A parking meter and caravan	more
26 January 1986	Roy Hattersley	Shakespearean Tragedy by A. C. Bradley	Boy writer's set	more
2 February 1986	Dennis Taylor	A joke book	Limitless supply of yoghurt	more
9 February 1986	Bruce Oldfield	The Destiny of Darcy Dancer, Gentleman by J. P. Donleavy	Cigarettes	more
16 February 1986	Ben Kingsley	Unknown	Telescope	more
23 February 1986	Selina Scott	Hawk Moon by Sam Shepard	Hairbrush	more
2 March 1986	John Dankworth	The Exchange & Mart	Solar-powered synthesizer	more
9 March 1986	Beryl Bainbridge	The Worst Journey in the World by Apsley Cherry-Garrard	Old-fashioned diary with pens	more
16 March 1986	Ron Pickering	The Guinness Book of Records	Typewriter	more
23 March 1986	Shirley Williams	The collected poems of W. B. Yeats	Computer	more
30 March 1986	Jane Glover	The Letters of Virginia Woolf	Bathroom with many full cupboards	more
6 April 1986	Arthur Hailey	Webster's International Dictionary	Hot water	more
25 May 1986	Bobby Robson	Roget's Thesaurus	Set of golf clubs and endless supply of balls	more
1 June 1986	Elton John	Interview with a Vampire by Anne Rice	Telephone	more
8 June 1986	Ismail Merchant	The works of E. M. Forster, P. D. James and Ruth Prawer Jhabvala	Cooking range	more
15 June 1986	Max Hastings	The Wind in the Willows by Kenneth Grahame	Word processor linked to a Fleet Street newspaper	more
22 June 1986	Jackie Stewart	The Guinness Book of Records	Blank book and pen	more
29 June 1986	Anne-Sophie Mutter	Robinson Crusoe by Daniel Defoe	Stradivarius violin	more
6 July 1986	Brian Redhead	A commentary on the Bible by Arthur Pink	Taj Mahal	more
13 July 1986	Sir David Wilson	The Diary of Samuel Pepys	Refrigerator	more
20 July 1986	Sir Geoffrey Howe	The Good Food Guide	Computer bridge game	more
27 July 1986	Roger Vadim	Death on the Installment Plan by Louis-Ferdinand Céline	Chess computer	more
3 August 1986	Norman Lewis	The Histories by Herodotus	Spirit stove	more
10 August 1986	Virginia Holgate	A do-it-yourself manual	Never-ending supply of smoked salmon	more
17 August 1986	Jane Lapotaire	The I Ching	Pencils and paper	more
24 August 1986	Stan Barstow	À la recherche du temps perdu by Marcel Proust	Paper and pens	more
31 August 1986	Auberon Waugh	Other Men's Flowers by Lord Wavell	Vine	more
7 September 1986	Andrew Davis	Gulliver's Travels by Jonathan Swift	Collection of Apostle spoons	more
14 September 1986	James Herbert	Anthology including The History of Mr Polly by H. G. Wells	Grand piano	more
21 September 1986	Suzi Quatro	Atlas Shrugged by Ayn Rand	Piano	more
28 September 1986	Richard Condon	Boy Scout annual	Calendar watch	more
5 October 1986	Sir Ian MacGregor	Encyclopædia Britannica	Thermos jug	more
12 October 1986	Sir Fred Hoyle	Handbook of physics	Portable telescope	more
19 October 1986	Phil Edmonds	Book on flora and fauna of the island	Royal Jamaica cigars	more
26 October 1986	Albert Roux and Michel Roux	Cookery books	Books on how to manage people and ivory carving	more
2 November 1986	Jeremy Irons	A construction manual	Camera and film	more
9 November 1986	Kingsley Amis	Oxford English Dictionary	Scotch whisky	more
16 November 1986	Hal Prince	Look Homeward, Angel by Thomas Wolfe	Bouillabaisse with langouste and wine	more
23 November 1986	John Ridgway	The Wind in the Willows by Kenneth Grahame	Shaving kit	more
30 November 1986	Nigel Hawthorne	Teach yourself French	Pencils and paper	more
7 December 1986	Jackie Collins	The Great Gatsby by F. Scott Fitzgerald	Photograph of her family	more
14 December 1986	Benny Green	A Quartet of Comedies by H. G. Wells	Saxophone	more

== 1987 ==
Date	Castaway	Book	Luxury	More info
4 January 1987	Tony Bennett	Crime and Punishment by Fyodor Dostoyevsky	Suit	more
11 January 1987	James Prior	Times Atlas of the World	Golf clubs and balls	more
18 January 1987	Jeremy Lloyd	Three Men in a Boat by Jerome K. Jerome	Guitar	more
25 January 1987	Baroness Ryder of Warsaw	The autobiography of Wilfred Owen	Pillow	more
1 February 1987	Peter Fluck and Roger Law	My Last Breath by Luis Buñuel	Margaret Thatcher's resignation speech	more
8 February 1987	Victoria Wood	The collected works of Arthur Marshall	Cinema organ	more
15 February 1987	Sir Michael Hordern	History of the English-Speaking Peoples by Winston Churchill	Elm tree	more
22 February 1987	Ken Russell	The Prelude by William Wordsworth	Quart of brandy	more
1 March 1987	Sir Nicholas Goodison	Unknown	Unknown	more
8 March 1987	Johnny Mathis	Gone With the Wind by Margaret Mitchell	Golf bag	more
15 March 1987	Dora Bryan	Three Men in a Boat by Jerome K. Jerome	Stuffed dog	more
22 March 1987	David Penhaligon	A cricketing Almanack	30 foot of steel	more
29 March 1987	Peter Alliss	History of the English-Speaking Peoples by Winston Churchill	Sand-yacht	more
5 April 1987	Anthony Andrews	The Complete Works of Oscar Wilde	Piano	more
12 April 1987	Julian Critchley	An Omelette and a Glass of Wine by Elizabeth David	Case of wine	more
19 April 1987	Michael Bogdanov	Pocket Wine Book 1987 by Hugh Johnson	50-pound jar of Marmite	more
26 April 1987	Frank Bough	Barclays World of Cricket by Jim Swanton	Contact lenses	more
28 June 1987	Terence Stamp	The Joy of Cooking	Duvet	more
5 July 1987	Robert Maxwell	A book on Plato	Chess computer game	more
12 July 1987	Elaine Paige	The Complete Works of Charles Dickens	Piano	more
19 July 1987	Lucinda Green	Unknown	Unknown	more
26 July 1987	Kenneth Williams	The Golden Treasury by Francis Palgrave	Crate of Cologne	more
2 August 1987	Maya Angelou	The Negro Caravan	Painting of Kumasi Market by John T. Biggers	more
9 August 1987	Frances Edmonds	The Hitchhiker's Guide to the Galaxy by Douglas Adams	Bollinger '69	more
16 August 1987	Susan George	Will You Be My Friend? by James Kavanaugh	Four poster bed	more
23 August 1987	Edna O'Brien	Encyclopædia Britannica	Cristal champagne	more
30 August 1987	Lord Montagu	The Lord of the Rings by J. R. R. Tolkien	Windsurfing board	more
6 September 1987	Kitty Godfree	The Eagle Has Landed by Jack Higgins	Bicycle	more
13 September 1987	Joanna Lumley	A Dance to the Music of Time by Anthony Powell	Specially-commissioned John Ward painting of family and friends	more
20 September 1987	Peter West	Oxford Dictionary of Quotations	Set of gardening tools	more
27 September 1987	Jacques Loussier	Beasts, Men and Gods by Ferdinand Ossendowski	Piano	more
4 October 1987	Lulu	Where Are You Going? by Swami Muktananda	Telephone	more
11 October 1987	Lord Killanin	A Vanished Arcadia by Robert Bontine Cunninghame Graham	Olympic gold medal and award	more
18 October 1987	Sir James Callaghan	War and Peace by Leo Tolstoy	Telescope and star-gazing book	more
25 October 1987	Bernard Levin	The Michelin Guide to France	Laptop computer	more
1 November 1987	Bamber Gascoigne	Tristram Shandy by Laurence Sterne	Carpentry tools	more
8 November 1987	Sue Lawley	French Provincial Cooking by Elizabeth David	Iron and ironing board	more
15 November 1987	Robert Carrier	The Alexandria Quartet by Lawrence Durrell	Tajine	more
22 November 1987	Barry Cryer	The Complete Works of J. B. Priestley	Tape recorder with a cassette of recordings from home	more
29 November 1987	Vernon Scannell	Compiled anthology of English poetry	Enormous amount of A4 paper	more
6 December 1987	Antony Sher	Blank book or journal	Pens, charcoal and paints	more
13 December 1987	Lew Grade	The Antiquary by Walter Scott	Crate of Montecristo cigars	more

== 1988 ==
Date	Castaway	Book	Luxury	More info
10 January 1988	Adele Leigh	Alice in Wonderland by Lewis Carroll	Loofah	more
17 January 1988	Michael Heseltine	The Dictionary of Trees and Shrubs	Mosquito net	more
24 January 1988	Gemma Craven	Floyd on Fish by Keith Floyd	Manicure set	more
31 January 1988	Lord Donoughue	Unknown	Unknown	more
7 February 1988	Margaret Kelly – Miss Bluebell	History of the English-Speaking Peoples by Winston Churchill	Her first dress worn on stage	more
14 February 1988	William Davis	The Dictionary of Samuel Johnson	Telescope	more
21 February 1988	Dennis Potter	Spycatcher by Peter Wright	Train set	more
28 February 1988	Stephanie Beacham	The Ascent of Man by Dr Jacob Bronowski	Photograph of her children	more
6 March 1988	James Burke	The works of Homer	Guitar and strings	more
13 March 1988	Brendan Foster	The Lakeland Peaks (photographs) by W. A. Poucher	Tea	more
27 March 1988	Lord Hailsham	The works of Homer	Bathtub and some soap	more
3 April 1988	Jane Asher	Tess of the d'Urbervilles by Thomas Hardy	Hot bath with extra tap for cold champagne	more
10 April 1988	Arthur Scargill	Huckleberry Finn by Mark Twain	The Mona Lisa	more
17 April 1988	Mary Archer	Remembrance of Things Past by Marcel Proust	Needles, cotton and material	more
24 April 1988	Michael Gambon	Republican Party Reptile by P. J. O'Rourke	Car (in which to listen to music)	more
1 May 1988	Neil Kinnock	Essays on Equality by R. H. Tawney	Radio 4	more
8 May 1988	Peggy Makins	The biggest atlas in the world	Little rosebush	more
15 May 1988	Rowan Atkinson	Uncle Fred in Springtime by P. G. Wodehouse	Car (to clean)	more
22 May 1988	Anita Roddick	Prince of Tides by Pat Conroy	Comfortable bed with pillows and sheets	more
29 May 1988	Rabbi Lionel Blue	The biggest volume of pure maths	Toilet bag	more
5 June 1988	Anton Mosimann	Opera di M. Bartolomeo Scappi (recipe book of the Pope's chef in 1525)	Steamer for cooking	more
12 June 1988	Douglas Hurd	Oxford Book of 20th Century English Verse	Champagne	more
19 June 1988	Gwen Ffrangcon-Davies	No other book requested	Large bottle of toilet water	more
26 June 1988	Jeremy Isaacs	A compilation of Benny Green	Frogman's outfit and snorkel	more
3 July 1988	Dr David Owen	His own anthology of poems	Hot bath	more
10 July 1988	David Essex	The Guinness Book of Records	Set of cricket equipment	more
17 July 1988	Dame Edna Everage	Filofax	Madge Allsop	more
24 July 1988	Lord Armstrong	The collected works of Jane Austen	Music manuscript paper, pencil and rubber	more
31 July 1988	Joan Turner	Introduction to the Devout Life by Francis de Sales	Baked beans	more
7 August 1988	Reverend Ian Paisley	Foxe's Book of Martyrs	High-powered radio	more
14 August 1988	Patricia Neal	A collection of short stories	Toothbrush and toothpaste	more
21 August 1988	Lord Dacre of Glanton	The collected Works of Virgil	Paper, pen and ink	more
28 August 1988	Anita Dobson	The Picture of Dorian Gray by Oscar Wilde	Bed	more
4 September 1988	Alfred Wainwright	Two photographs (one of his wife; one of 1928 Blackburn Rovers team)	Mirror	more
11 September 1988	Peter Donohoe	The Complete Scripts of Billy Connolly	Waterbed	more
18 September 1988	Salman Rushdie	Arabian Nights	Unlisted radio telephone	more
25 September 1988	Trevor Huddleston	Oxford Book of English Verse	Binoculars	more
2 October 1988	Athene Seyler	The Disinherited by Gareth Jones	Case of champagne	more
9 October 1988	Terry Wogan	The collected works of P. G. Wodehouse	Radio-cassette player and language tapes	more
16 October 1988	Cilla Black	Aesop's Fables	Manicure set and nail varnish	more
23 October 1988	Michael Foot	Don Juan by Lord Byron	Alarm clock encased in Welsh tinplate	more
30 October 1988	Germaine Greer	The Oxford English Dictionary	Hot spices	more
6 November 1988	Claus Moser	Volume of James Thurber	Concert grand Steinway piano	more
13 November 1988	Bob Hoskins	Catch-22 by Joseph Heller	Telescope	more
20 November 1988	Bob Champion	Fraser's Horse Book	A bronze statue of the racehorse Aldaniti	more
27 November 1988	Stephen Fry	Jeeves Omnibus by P. G. Wodehouse	Suicide pill	more
4 December 1988	Baroness Warnock	The Last Chronicle of Barset by Anthony Trollope	Pen and paper	more
11 December 1988	Charles Dance	A Dream in the Luxembourg by Richard Aldington	Guitar	more
18 December 1988	Edward Heath	A volume of the works of Impressionist painters	Suntan lotion	more

== 1989 ==
Date	Castaway	Book	Luxury	More info
1 January 1989	Rev Robert Runcie	The Odyssey by Homer	Rocking chair	more
8 January 1989	Twiggy	Tess of the d'Urbervilles by Thomas Hardy	Cold cream	more
15 January 1989	Tony Benn	Das Kapital by Karl Marx	Kettle and teabags	more
22 January 1989	Boy George	Photograph album	Radio receiver	more
29 January 1989	Joan Armatrading	Why Didn't They Ask Evans? by Agatha Christie	Guitar	more
5 February 1989	Rocco Forte	The Divine Comedy by Dante Alighieri	Snooker table	more
12 February 1989	Jeffrey Tate	The collected works of Jane Austen	Nativity painting from the National Gallery	more
19 February 1989	Enoch Powell	Old Testament (in Hebrew and Greek)	Smoking device to smoke fish	more
26 February 1989	David Hare	Larousse Gastronomique	Cricket bat and bowling machine	more
5 March 1989	Dame Josephine Barnes	The scores of all music chosen in a bound volume	Word processor	more
12 March 1989	Gerald Scarfe	Anything by Capability Brown	River painting by Turner	more
2 April 1989	Sir Stephen Spender	Remembrance of Things Past by Marcel Proust	Painting or sculpture by son with photograph of daughter	more
9 April 1989	Leslie Grantham	Robinson Crusoe by Daniel Defoe	Metal detector	more
16 April 1989	Lord Jenkins	Who's Who	Case of Bordeaux wine	more
23 April 1989	Miriam Rothschild	Encyclopædia Britannica	Bag of wildflower seeds	more
30 April 1989	Lady Redgrave	Jane Eyre by Charlotte Brontë	Case of champagne	more
7 May 1989	Lenny Henry	Catch-22 by Joseph Heller	Graphic novels (comics)	more
14 May 1989	Thora Hird	Scene and Hird by Thora Hird	Cleansing milk	more
21 May 1989	Katharine Hamnett	I Ching	Aircraft carrier	more
28 May 1989	Sir Nicholas Henderson	Guy de Maupassant's short stories	Sculpture from the Louvre and box of different seeds	more
4 June 1989	Richard Branson	Teach yourself Japanese phrase book	Notebooks and pens	more
11 June 1989	Jonathon Porritt	Bleak House by Charles Dickens	Fountain pen	more
18 June 1989	Maria Aitken	Fun in a Chinese Laundry by Josef von Sternberg	Amazonian rain-maker	more
25 June 1989	Joan Collins	The Picture of Dorian Gray by Oscar Wilde	Large bottle of suntan oil and moisturiser	more
2 July 1989	Mark McCormack	Les Misérables by Victor Hugo	Suntan lotion	more
9 July 1989	Ned Sherrin	No Bed for Bacon by Caryl Brahms	Seed potatoes	more
16 July 1989	Sir Thomas Armstrong	No other book requested	Clavichord	more
3 September 1989	Dame Vera Lynn	A book on edible fruits and vegetables	Watercolour paints, brushes and paper	more
10 September 1989	Eric Clapton	Barnaby Rudge by Charles Dickens	Guitar	more
17 September 1989	Penelope Lively	Moby-Dick by Herman Melville	Binoculars	more
24 September 1989	John Ogdon	The Moonstone by Wilkie Collins	Steinway piano	more
1 October 1989	Lucinda Lambton	Dictionary of National Biography	Word processor	more
8 October 1989	Jack Lemmon	A Play in the Fields of Our Lord by Peter Matheson	Piano	more
15 October 1989	Alan Plater	Smell of Sunday Dinner by Sid Chaplin	Writing materials	more
22 October 1989	Colin Thubron	A Year of Grace by Victor Gollancz	Scuba-diving equipment	more
5 November 1989	Ian Botham	Encyclopaedia of species of fish of the world	Fishing rod	more
12 November 1989	Michael Codron	Caroline and Charlotte by Alison Plowman	Jigsaw puzzles	more
19 November 1989	Seamus Heaney	Ulysses by James Joyce	Doc Martens boots	more
26 November 1989	Lady Mosley	Remembrance of Things Past by Marcel Proust	Soft pillow	more
3 December 1989	Nigel Lawson	The poetry of John Donne	Radio receiver	more
17 December 1989	Pauline Collins	Teach yourself physics	Paper, pencils and paints	more
24 December 1989	The Duchess of Kent	A do-it-yourself manual	Lamp with solar batteries	more
31 December 1989	Dirk Bogarde	Akenfield by Ronald Blythe	Distillery	more

== 1990 ==
Date	Castaway	Book	Luxury	More info
7 January 1990	Dennis Skinner	Let's Face the Music by Benny Green	Bike	more
14 January 1990	John Peel	A Dance to the Music of Time by Anthony Powell	Football	more
21 January 1990	Sir Robin Day	Oxford Book of English Verse	Magnum of champagne	more
28 January 1990	Lord Weidenfeld	The Pickwick Papers by Charles Dickens	Armchair with coffee machine and rescue signal	more
4 February 1990	Sarah Miles	I Ching	Word processor	more
11 February 1990	Michael Tilson Thomas	Collected Poems of Rainer Maria Rilke	Yahama computerised concert grand piano	more
18 February 1990	John Pilger	Catch-22 by Joseph Heller	Typewriter	more
25 February 1990	John Sessions	David Copperfield by Charles Dickens	A 78 rpm record of "The Laughing Policeman" to smash on the rocks	more
4 March 1990	Sir Ian Trethowan	War and Peace by Leo Tolstoy	Champagne	more
11 March 1990	Professor Sir George Porter	Non-Equilibrium Thermo Dynamics by Prigogine	Computer, pen and paper	more
18 March 1990	Richard Rogers	The Odyssey by Homer	His wife Ruth, but if this is disallowed then a painting	more
25 March 1990	John Biffen	Wisden Cricketers' Almanack	Rain gauge	more
15 April 1990	Sir Crispin Tickell	Guide to Science by Asimov	Solar-powered telescope	more
22 April 1990	Mary Wesley	Love in the Time of Cholera by Gabriel García Márquez	Denis Healey or large double bed with pillows	more
29 April 1990	June Whitfield	A do-it-yourself manual	Supply of cocoa butter and hat	more
6 May 1990	Prue Leith	The Barchester novels by Anthony Trollope	Jeroboam of champagne	more
13 May 1990	Molly Keane	A bound copy of the Spectator magazines	A bed, netted from snakes and flies	more
20 May 1990	Jonathan Pryce	Short stories of Bernard MacLaverty	Endless supply of rum punch	more
27 May 1990	David Blunkett	Anthology of verse by Robert Graves	Radio/cassette machine	more
3 June 1990	Ken Dodd	The Times atlas of the world	A box of scented soap	more
10 June 1990	Maeve Binchy	Teach yourself bridge	Photograph album	more
17 June 1990	Harold Fielding	Great Murder Trials of the 20th Century by David Napley	Large bag of sugar	more
24 June 1990	George Carman	The Golden Treasury by Francis Palgrave	Painting of the Grand Canal in Venice	more
1 July 1990	Kaffe Fassett	Reflections by Hermann Hesse	Diary and pen	more
8 July 1990	Peter Jonas	The City of God by Saint Augustine	Cyanide, in a joint, in champagne truffle in a fridge	more
15 July 1990	Jean Rook	The Mayor of Casterbridge by Thomas Hardy	Computer	more
2 September 1990	Robin Knox-Johnston	Books identifying birds and fish	Video recorder and tapes of the Queen Mother's parade	more
9 September 1990	Lord Charteris	War and Peace by Leo Tolstoy	Set of wood-carving tools	more
16 September 1990	Ruth Westheimer	Gone with the Wind by Margaret Mitchell	Large box of marrons glaces	more
23 September 1990	Barbara Windsor	A book about Hollywood	Writing materials and Union Flag	more
30 September 1990	Gary Lineker	Wisden Cricketers' Almanack	Bowling machine	more
7 October 1990	John Thaw	The Wind in the Willows by Kenneth Grahame	Large comfortable armchair	more
14 October 1990	Clive Jenkins	Look Homeward, Angel by Thomas Wolfe	Video player and tape of Citizen Kane	more
21 October 1990	Ernie Wise	The Mystery of Edwin Drood by Charles Dickens	Yellow Rolls-Royce	more
28 October 1990	Nicholas Snowman	Smiley's People by John le Carré	Coffee machine	more
4 November 1990	Lord Annan	The Iliad in Greek and English by Homer	Bath essence	more
11 November 1990	Baroness Castle of Blackburn	The collected works of William Morris	Typewriter	more
18 November 1990	Elizabeth Welch	Who's Who in the Theatre	Photo of her mother	more
25 November 1990	Baroness Trumpington	George V by Kenneth Rose	The crown jewels (so someone will look for her)	more
2 December 1990	Sir Eduardo Paolozzi	A tropical plant book in Italian with English gloss	Hurdy gurdy	more
23 December 1990	Brian Keenan	The Life, Times and Music of an Irish Harper by Donal O'Sullivan	Pencil	more
30 December 1990	Keith Floyd	Gormenghast by Mervyn Peake	Pair of handmade blue suede shoes	more
