= Alfred Piccaver =

American singer (1884–1958)

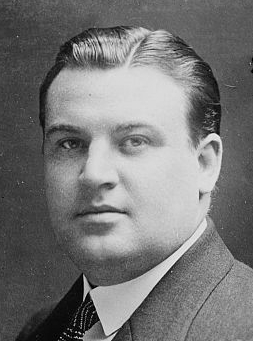
- Born: February 5, 1884; Long Sutton, Lincolnshire, England
- Died: September 23, 1958 (aged 74); Vienna, Austria
- Citizenship: United Kingdom; United States
- Occupation: Singer
- Spouses: Baroness Mariette Styrcea (divorced); Ria Günzel (m. 1926)

Alfred Piccaver (5 February 1884 – 23 September 1958) was a British-American operatic dramatic/spinto tenor. He was particularly noted for his performances as Rodolfo in Giacomo Puccini's La bohème and other popular mainstream operatic roles.

== Early years ==
Piccaver was born on 5 February 1884 in the Lincolnshire town of Long Sutton to chemist Frederick Herman Piccaver (1864 - 17 February 1916) and his wife Sarah Ann Sissons. The Piccavers had been farm laborers, but there were also claims of Spanish ancestry dating back to the Spanish Armada. At a young age, Alfred emigrated with his family to the United States of America. The family resettled in Albany, NY and took American citizenship. Frederick Piccaver worked as head brewer of the Beverwyck Brewery. Alfred joined the choir of Albany's St. Peter's Episcopal Church as a boy soprano. He also became a soloist at the North Reformed Church in Watervliet. The young Piccaver went on to study voice with S. Graham Nobbes, who had been chief instructor of the Emma Willard Conservatory of Music and with Allan Lindsay, conductor of the Troy Conservatory of Music. Alfred later trained to be electrical engineer but he had a talent for singing and in 1905 he enrolled at the Metropolitan School of Opera. The school's director Heinrich Conried recognised his considerable vocal ability and in 1907 sent the young Alfred to Prague, where he studied with Ludmilla Prochazka-Neumann (1872–1954).

== Debut and work in Europe ==
His studies led to a three-year contract with the Deutsches Landes-Theater in Prague where he made his debut on 9 September 1907 in Otto Nicolai's The Merry Wives of Windsor. In the following three years, he sang in operas by Flotow, Verdi, Wagner, Mozart, Puccini and Gounod. This variety stood him in good stead, because in 1910, he was invited to appear as a guest in Mattia Battistini's touring company that was performing in Prague. He must have impressed Battistini because Piccaver was persuaded to travel with the company to their next venue in Vienna where the Vienna Hofoper showed an interest in him. However, he continued to sing with the Prague company for the remainder of his contract and it was not until 6 September 1912 that he gave his first performance with the Vienna State Opera as a permanent member.

== A star in Vienna ==
Piccaver had a warm, velvety, lyric tenor voice with a fine cantilena style and excellent legato and diction. Later on it became what an English critic has described as 'slack muscled' and acquired a baritonal quality, but in the early years of his prime he was known to the Viennese as 'the Caruso from Prague'. His roles included Rodolfo (Puccini called him 'my ideal Rodolfo'), Cavaradossi, Canio, Radames, Florestan, Lensky and Walther. He made a large number of recordings by both the acoustic and electrical processes and many of these are available on CD reissues.

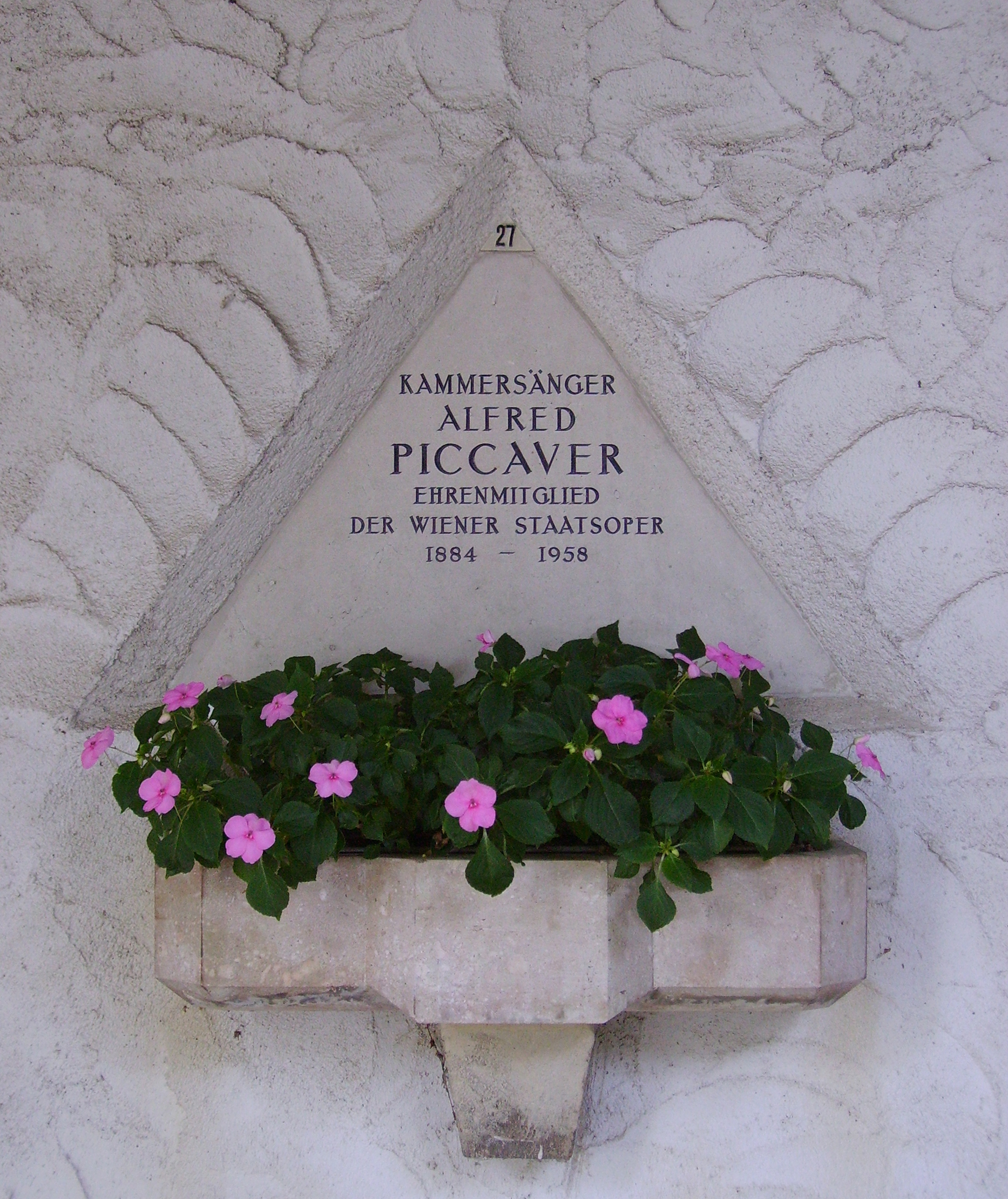
Feuerhalle Simmering, grave of Alfred Piccaver

Piccaver loved Vienna and the Viennese way of life, so much so that when the director of the Metropolitan Opera in New York, Giulio Gatti-Casazza, made a lucrative offer for him to appear at the Met, he turned it down. He was never asked again. In return, the Viennese were devoted to 'Picci', as he was affectionately known. When the First World War broke out Piccaver as an American citizen was unaffected, though when the United States joined the war in 1917 he was found trying to leave the country but was spared internment if he agreed to continue singing at the Opera. After the war his career at the Vienna State Opera was interrupted by appearances in Chicago in 1923, 1924 and 1925 and at London's Royal Opera House, Covent Garden, in 1924, the only year in which he appeared at this house.

In 1923, for reasons that are not clear, he claimed British nationality as he was entitled to do as a result of his place of birth, though Alfred Piccaver always considered himself an American. On 31 December 1931 his contract with The Vienna State Opera was terminated as a result of a dispute over his salary. He continued to live in Vienna and to make guest appearances in opera in Austria and abroad but with the political situation in Austria worsening he decided to return to Britain in 1937, settling in Putney, London. He made some records and concert appearances in London and even appeared on the BBC's fledgling television service in 1939. Piccaver also worked as teacher, giving lessons in music and singing, one of his pupils being the tenor Nigel Douglas. After the war, in 1955 he returned to Vienna for the re-opening of the Vienna State Opera House and decided to stay permanently.

He died in his favourite city on 23 September 1958. The Austrian government gave him a state funeral. His coffin was carried in procession from the Protestant Church to the Opera House, where many attended to pay their respects. The Vienna Philharmonic Orchestra played the funeral march from Beethoven's Eroica Symphony. His ashes are buried at Feuerhalle Simmering Vienna.

== Personal life ==
Piccaver's first marriage was to Baroness Mariette Styrcea (born Marietta Johanny, died 11 Nov 1934), the daughter of an Austrian Lutheran minister. Mariette worked for the Volkstheater company in Vienna. She was still a teenager when she met Piccaver. The union later ended in divorce. In 1926, Piccaver married Ria Günzel, an Austrian dancer. Piccaver for a time had a home in Pittsburgh, Pennsylvania.
