= Scarlett (musical) =

- Gone With The Wind
- Original London Cast recording
- Music: Harold Rome
- Lyrics: Harold Rome
- Book: Kazuo Kikuta; Horton Foote (English translation)
- Basis: Gone With the Wind by Margaret Mitchell
- Productions: 1970 Tokyo; 1972 West End

Scarlett is a 1970 musical with a score by Harold Rome. The original 1966 Japanese book is by Kazuo Kikuta, and was translated to English by Horton Foote. Based on Margaret Mitchell's 1936 bestseller Gone with the Wind, it traces the fate of self-centered Southern belle Scarlett O'Hara and her passionately turbulent relationship with dashing blockade runner Rhett Butler from the days prior to the American Civil War through the war itself and the following period of Reconstruction.

The Tokyo production was directed by American director/choreographer Joe Layton, who later directed a production in the London West End. London producer Harold Fielding cancelled his plans for a 1974 Broadway production, and the musical has never been performed on Broadway.

== Productions ==
In 1966, a nine-hour play (without music) based on Gone with the Wind opened at the Tokyo Imperial Theatre. This production was highly successful, and Kazuo Kikuta and the Toho Company decided to produce a musical version of Gone with the Wind at the same theatre. Kikuta wrote the book to the new musical, but the rest of the production was largely the work of Americans-the director was Joe Layton, the musical director was well-known Broadway conductor Lehman Engel and the music and songs were by Harold Rome. Although Rome is credited for music and lyrics (entirely Japanese in its 1966 iteration), Rome's English lyrics were translated by journeymen Japanese writers and not credited in the western cast recordings. The original Tokyo production was presented in two parts – each for 6 months – and each ran four hours long. The production opened in January 1970 with the title Scarlett.

In 1972, the musical would be given its western/English language debut in London. It had a new book adapted by Horton Foote and was rechristened Gone with the Wind. The West End version, produced by Harold Fielding and again directed by Joe Layton, opened at the Theatre Royal, Drury Lane with a cast headed by June Ritchie, Harve Presnell, Patricia Michael, and Robert Swann. There was an attempt to trim the show's length to the standard 2.5 hours for a stage show in the West but it still ran close to four hours long. The majority of reviews praised Ritchie's Scarlett and were duly impressed by Layton's staging; however, they criticized Foote's adaptation of the story, which relied heavily on the audience's prior knowledge of the characters and plot and as a result was sketchy in its presentation of both. Still, Fielding was encouraged enough to announce a Broadway opening for April 7, 1974.

In August 1973, a revised version of the London production was mounted at the Dorothy Chandler Pavilion in Los Angeles by the city's Civic Light Opera Association, with Lesley Ann Warren, Pernell Roberts, Udana Power, and Terence Monk in the leads. The strongly negative reviews prompted Layton to make numerous changes throughout the Los Angeles and subsequent San Francisco runs, but Fielding cancelled his plan to take the show to Broadway. In 1976, Lucia Victor staged a production in Dallas that travelled to three other cities, the last time the musical was produced.

== Song list ==
=== Japanese Cast Album ===
(The songs were, of course performed in Japanese. These are merely the translated English titles.)

Act I

- "Overture"/"He Loves Me"
- "We Belong to You"
- "Scarlett"
- "We Belong to You" (Reprise)
- "Two of a Kind"
- "Two of a Kind" (Reprise)/"Blissful Christmas"/"My Soldier"/"Blissful Christmas" (Reprise)
- "Goodbye My Honey"
- "Lonely Stranger"
- "A Time for Love"
- "What Is Love?"
- "Gambling Man"
- "Which Way is Home?"

Act II

- "Entracte"/"Bonnie Blue Flag"
- "O'Hara"
- "The Newlyweds Song"
- "Strange and Wonderful"
- "Blueberry Eyes"
- "Little Wonder"
- "Bonnie Gone"
- "Finale"

=== London Cast Album ===
Act I

- "Overture"/"Today's The Day"
- "We Belong to You"
- "Tara"
- "Two of a Kind"
- "Blissful Christmas"/"Home Again"/"Tomorrow Is Another Day"
- "Lonely Stranger"
- "A Time for Love"
- "Which Way Is Home?"

Act II

- "Entracte"
- "How Often, How Often"
- "If Only"
- "A Southern Lady"
- "Marrying For Fun"
- "Blueberry Eyes"
- "Strange and Wonderful"
- "Little Wonders"
- "Bonnie Gone"
- "It Doesn't Matter Now"/"Finale"

=== Los Angeles – First Performance ===
Note: The score was heavily cut and revised during the Los Angeles and San Francisco runs

Act I

- "Overture"/"Today's The Day"
- "Cakewalk"
- "We Belong to You"
- "Scarlett"
- "We Belong to You" (Reprise)
- "Bonnie Blue Flag"
- "Bazaar Hymn"
- "Virginia Reel"
- "Quadrille"
- "Two of a Kind"
- "Blissful Christmas"
- "My Soldier"
- "Tomorrow Is Another Day"
- "Ashley's Departure"
- "Where Is My Soldier Boy?"/"Why Did They Die?"/"Johnny Is My Darling"/"Bonnie Blue Flag"
- "Lonely Stranger"
- "Atlanta Burning"
- "Tomorrow Is Another Day" (Reprise)

Act II

- "If Only"
- "How Often"
- "Gone With The Wind"
- "How Lucky"
- "A Southern Lady"
- "Marrying For Fun"
- "Brand New Friends"
- "Miss Fiddle-Dee-Dee"
- "Blueberry Eyes"
- "Bonnie Gone"
- "Two Of A Kind" (Reprise)
- "It Doesn't Matter Now"
