= Adele Leigh =

British operatic soprano (1928–2004)

- Born: 15 June 1928; Hackney, London, England
- Died: 23 May 2004 (aged 75)
- Occupation: Operatic soprano

Adele Leigh (15 June 1928 – 23 May 2004) was an English operatic soprano, later the wife of the Austrian ambassador in London.

== Early life ==
Leigh was born in Hackney, East London on 15 June 1928. Her father left when she was two and she was brought up in Highbury by her mother, Betty, and her Polish-Jewish immigrant grandparents. At the start of World War II, the family moved to Reading, where they all shared one rented room in a large house. A few years later, the family returned to London, and she went to Crouch End High School for Girls.

Leigh trained at RADA and later at the Juilliard School, New York, and in 1948 joined the opera company at Covent Garden.

== Career ==
In 1948, Leigh was recruited by the Royal Opera at Covent Garden and was, at 19 years old, the youngest principal among such future stars as Geraint Evans and Sylvia Fisher. The previous day, impresario C. B. Cochran had signed her in the leading role of Bless the Bride, a new musical by Vivian Ellis and A. P. Herbert. After much negotiating, Cochran released Leigh from the contract.

Leigh made her Covent Garden debut as Countess Ceprano in Verdi's Rigoletto. She first achieved critical notice as Barbarina in The Marriage of Figaro, soon adding Susanna and Cherubino to her repertoire. She went on to sing Pamina in The Magic Flute and the title role in Massenet's Manon, which she learnt in a week. She sang Sophie in Strauss's Der Rosenkavalier, under Erich Kleiber, and the Marzelline in Beethoven's Fidelio under Rudolf Kempe.

In 1958, she acted in Davy, the last Ealing Comedy to be made by Ealing Studios, directed by Michael Relph and starring Harry Secombe, Alexander Knox and Ron Randell. The same year she performed at the Royal Variety Performance.

Leigh made her American debut as Musetta in Boston in 1959, and the following year sang in New York with City Opera, as Sophie in Werther and Octavian; she also learnt Hanna Glawari in The Merry Widow in English (and made her first entrance wearing white satin rather than traditional black). When she joined Zurich Opera in 1961, the Intendant, Herbert Graf, agreed to her singing Glawari, among other roles, but insisted she made her entrance in black. As her ambition was to sing the role in Vienna, her success in Zurich led to engagement as she was principal soprano at the Vienna Volks Oper from 1963 to 1972, singing glamorous operetta roles which were her forte. In 1967 she appeared opposite Nigel Douglas in a BBC television broadcast of The Count of Luxembourg produced by Cedric Messina and conducted by David Lloyd-Jones.

She retired in 1981 but returned to the stage in 1987, when she played Heidi in the first London production of the musical Follies at the Shaftesbury Theatre, which was later recorded.

From 1992 she taught stagecraft and presentation at the Royal Northern College of Music in Manchester.

Leigh appeared twice on Desert Island Discs, in 1965 and 1988.

== Personal life ==
After her Covent Garden career, she married American bass-baritone James Pease, a widower 15 years her senior, who soon died from a heart attack while they were both singing at the Zürich Opera.

In 1967, she met and, within a fortnight, married Kurt Enderl, then Austrian Ambassador to Hungary and later to the UK.

She died on 23 May 2004. (Note: Some sources say she died in Vienna, others say in London.)

== Notes and references ==
Notes
