= Nigel Douglas =

English operatic tenor (1929–2022)

Nigel Douglas (born Nigel Douglas Leigh Pemberton; 9 May 1929 – 15 December 2022) was an English operatic tenor. His career began in Vienna and other German-speaking centres before he returned to Britain in the early 1970s, when he also directed operettas and broadcast about opera. Grove noted in the 1990s that the "dryness of his voice is offset by superb diction and the excellence of his acting".

== Life and career ==
Born Nigel Douglas Leigh Pemberton in Torry Hill, Kent, he was the middle of three brothers; Jeremy, younger, and Robin, older.. He adopted his first two Christian names alone as his stage name when he began singing professionally outside the UK, as these were easier to pronounce for non-English people, and continued to use them thereafter.

Douglas took Classics at Magdalen College, Oxford, and, initially as a baritone, sang as often as possible in amateur productions. He then spent 18 months working at Lloyds Insurance before he undertook singing lessons with Alfred Piccaver, who was living in London at the time. A casual remark to a friend about dissatisfaction with his work and that he had to quit his job and study singing, led him to learn that Piccaver, who had been a star tenor at the Vienna State Opera from 1910 until just before the Anschluss was living in Putney. After six months of study, Piccaver was invited back to Vienna for the re-opening of the Vienna State Opera in 1955, but wanted to continue teaching Douglas. When Piccaver returned to Vienna, Douglas followed, and enrolled at the Vienna Music Academy. He shared a "cosy old rabbit-warren of an attic flat" with the Finnish baritone Tom Krause. Whenever they spent the evening at a Heuriger they sang, and waiters addressed them as 'Herr Kammersänger', and made sure they had plenty of free wine.

He had stopped German classes after one term at school, and initially he "could only understand about one-tenth" of what the teachers were saying. In addition, the German which was acceptable in many international opera houses was not approved by the professors at the Vienna Academy, and he also had to learn the Italian operatic repertoire in German.

Douglas made his professional debut at the Kammeroper in 1959 as Rodolfo, and went on to sing at the Volksoper. His first professional contracts were in Biel/Solothurn where he sang the tenor leads in Madama Butterfly, La Traviata, Don Giovanni, Barbiere, Undine and Nabucco, as well as Rosillon in The Merry Widow, then went to Coblenz in Germany where he added six more leading roles. In his next contract, in Basel, the director Dr Friedrich Schramm offered as his first two roles the Drum-Major in Wozzeck and Danilo in The Merry Widow, which set the scene for much of Douglas's career: modern or contemporary opera, and operetta. In Zurich he played Robespierre in Dantons Tod, Cacatois in L'île de Tulipatan and Count Zedlau in Wiener Blut.

He recalled that playing Danilo for the first time "was the hardest work I'd ever done in my life" due to the demands of acting, dancing, and the constant switching from sung to spoken text. Over his career he sang in around 25 operettas, alongside his opera work. In 1964 Douglas was invited to Sadler's Wells to sing the lead in The Gypsy Baron among a cast with little background for operetta. In 1965 Douglas's Barinkay in London Sadler's Wells was noted – "a pleasure to see a singer who knows how to put over a number with personality and panache. His basically rather dry voice hardens under pressure, but his softer, lyrical singing is well turned". Douglas played "a handsome Lorenzo" in the Italian version of Fra Diavolo at the farewell season for Tom Walsh at Wexford in 1966. In 1967 he appeared alongside Adele Leigh in a BBC television broadcast of The Count of Luxembourg produced by Cedric Messina, conducted by David Lloyd-Jones.

Although later in life he named his favourite roles as Rodolfo and Lionel, he stated that his great passion was Britten operas: "The greatest excitement in my career was working with Benjamin Britten". Britten had first heard Douglas at the 1968 Edinburgh Festival where, only having ever sung the title role of Peter Grimes in German, he took over at three hours notice in English. As a noted interpreter of Britten's operas, besides Grimes, he sang Albert Herring, Vere, Aschenbach and Lechmere, the latter in its TV premiere for the BBC in 1971 and the stage premiere at Covent Garden two years later. He sang Vere in Welsh National Opera's first performances outside the UK, in Michael Geliot's production of Billy Budd at the Lausanne Festival and the Zurich Festival. The role also brought him his only appearance at the Henry Wood Proms, in 1979.

Douglas also sang for the UK opera companies roles such as Ralph Rackstraw in H.M.S. Pinafore, where he "caught just the right degree of self-parody", an old man in Guntram conducted by John Pritchard, Loge in Welsh National Opera's Göran Järvefelt Ring Cycle in 1983, Shapkin in From the House of the Dead, and the Devil in Rimsky Korsakov's Christmas Eve at English National Opera in 1988. The latter roles represented what one reviewer described as his "gallery of dotty eccentrics", and his final performances aged 72 were as Hauk-Sendorf (which he had sung from 1995, including at the Brooklyn Academy of Music) at Glyndebourne in The Makropoulos Case. On the international scene, he sang Loge for the Opéra de Nice, Capriccio at the Teatro Massimo Bellini in Catania in 1993, and Herod with the Paris Opera in Seoul in 1994.

Other roles creations during his career included Jack Worthing in Bunbury by Paul Burkhard (Basel, 1964), l'Heureux in Madame Bovary by Heinrich Sutermeister (1967, Zurich), Philip in The Visitors by John Gardner (1972, Aldeburgh), Basil in The Servants by William Mathias for Welsh National Opera (1980), as well as Frank Innes in Hermiston by Robin Orr, "a smooth villain, ...instantly dislikeable in Nigel Douglas's fluent and persuasive performance".

He translated The Count of Luxembourg and Countess Maritza for New Sadler's Wells Opera in 1983. From the 1970s Douglas presented over 300 BBC radio programmes, such as 'Singer's Choice' and 'Operetta Nights'; after retirement, he wrote books about opera, singers and singing: Legendary Voices, More Legendary Voices and The Joy of Opera. In the early 1980s he taught at the Royal College of Music. He was a member of the BBC's Music Advisory Committee from 1987 to 1989 and was appointed to the equivalent committee of the British Council in 1987.

The director David Pountney praised Douglas's humour, kindness and sensitivity while noting that his "professional success demanded other qualities, all of which he possessed: tenacity, discipline, reliability and adaptability... but also artistry, imagination and devotion to music-making of the highest standard".

His recordings include Owen Wingrave (1970, Decca), The Gypsy Baron (1965, His Master's Voice), Salome (1961, Decca), and an operetta recital with Adele Leigh, and the orchestra of the Vienna Volksoper conducted by Rudolf Bibl (1960, Philips).

Douglas died on 15 December 2022, aged 93.
