= Harold Fielding =

English Musical artist (1916–2003)

- Born: Harold Lewis Fielding; 4 December 1916; Woking, Surrey, England
- Died: 27 September 2003 (aged 86) Kingston upon Thames, London, England
- Genres: Musical theatre
- Occupation: Theatre producer
- Instrument: Violin
- Spouse: Maisie Joyce Skivens (m. 1955; died 1985)

Harold Lewis Fielding (4 December 1916 - 27 September 2003) was an English theatre producer.

Fielding was one of Britain's foremost theatrical producers who produced several musicals, including Mame, Charlie Girl, Half a Sixpence, Show Boat, Scarlett, Barnum, Sweet Charity, The Biograph Girl, and Ziegfeld. He also produced "Music for the Millions", a touring variety show.

The son of a stockbroker, Fielding was born in Woking, Surrey, England, and educated privately. As a child prodigy, he studied violin with Josef Szigeti. He also handled Tommy Steele's early career, and commissioned Half a Sixpence for him.

His office was Fielding House, 53-54 Haymarket, London.

He was interviewed by Sue Lawley on Desert Island Discs on BBC Radio 4 on 17 June 1990. In 1996, Fielding was awarded a Gold Badge from BASCA in recognition of his special contribution to Britain's entertainment industry.

Fielding married Maisie Joyce Skivens in 1955, and was widowed in 1985. They had no children.

He suffered a series of strokes in 1998, and retired to a private nursing home in Kingston upon Thames, where he died.
