= Stanley Rubinstein =

British lawyer and historian

Stanley Jack Rubinstein (17 January 1890 – 14 February 1975) was a British solicitor who specialised in copyright law, a novelist and historian.

== Biography ==
Rubinstein was born in Kensington, the eldest son of Joseph Samuel Rubinstein (1852–1915) and Isabella Alexandra Marks (1864–1960). He had two brothers, Harold (1891- 1975) and Ronald (1896–1947), and a sister Edna (born 1893).

Rubinstein followed his father as senior partner of the law firm Rubinstein, Nash & Co, where he also worked with his brothers Harold and Ronald at offices in Gray's Inn. His father had established the practice in 1889 with Daniel Leggatt, as Leggatt, Rubinstein & Co. The firm developed an expertise in publishing matters.

Prior to World War I, he ran a concert party, "The Mixed Pickles", who entertained youth clubs in London. He wrote and performed songs, some of which were published.

Stanley Rubinstein married Vera Solomon on 24 June 1915 at the New West End Synagogue in St Petersburgh Place, Bayswater, West London. His daughter Joan and son Anthony also worked for the family law firm, as did his grandson John Rubinstein. The firm merged with Manches in 1994, and Penningtons bought Manches in a pre-pack administration in 2013.

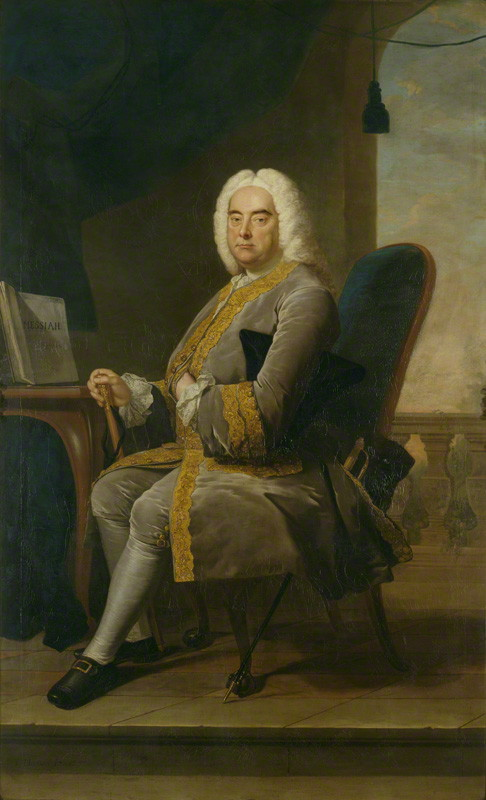
The 1756 Portrait of George Frideric Handel by Thomas Hudson, which Rubinstein helped to save for the National Portrait Gallery

In 1924, he was a founder member and organising secretary of the Telephone Users' Protection Association. Writing to The Times in 1927, he gave his address as Wrenhope, Frogmill Farm, Hurley, Berkshire. In 1967, he sat on an appeal committee to raise funds to purchase one of Thomas Hudson's portraits of Handel (1756), for the National Portrait Gallery. The appeal was successful. He was the chairman of Burke Publishing until 1975, and solicitor for the Henry Wood National Memorial Trust.

He appeared as a castaway on the BBC Radio programme Desert Island Discs on 11 August 1969 where he discussed his proposals for introducing copyright protection for elaborated ideas.

== Other family members ==
Stanley's brother Harold Rubinstein was the brother in law of Victor Gollancz, and acted on the defence of Radclyffe Hall's novel, The Well of Loneliness on obscenity charges in 1928. Harold's elder son, Michael Rubinstein acted for Penguin Books in the prosecution of D.H. Lawrence's novel Lady Chatterley's Lover for obscenity in 1960. Harold's younger son Hilary Rubinstein became a publisher and literary agent.

== Bibliography ==
- —— (1910). Temptation. Valse. Ascherberg, Hopwood & Crew.
- —— (1913). Goodnight. Song, words & music by S. J. Rubinstein. Bach & Co.
- —— (1926). Bubbson. An extra-vaganza. Jarrolds.
- —— (1932). Love In Law. Jarrolds.
- —— (1947). The Street Trader's Lot - London 1851. Sylvan Press.
- —— (1949). Merry Murder. Jarrolds.
- —— (1952). A Letter to the Editor - Reminiscences. Allan Wingate.
- —— (1968). Historians of London : an account of the many surveys, histories, perambulations, maps and engravings made about the city and its environs, and of the dedicated Londoners who made them. Peter Owen.
