= Anne Sharpley =

English journalist

Anne Sharpley (1928–1989) was an English journalist.

In the 1940s, she attended art school in York. While there, she won a Vogue magazine competition, which led to a career in journalism. During the 1960s, she was an investigative reporter with London's Evening Standard.

She was known for scooping other reporters with her account of Winston Churchill's funeral, by vandalising a telephone after filing it, thereby delaying her rivals' reports. She reputedly told Ann Leslie that a female foreign correspondent should:

First, sleep with the resident Reuters correspondent and then with the chief of police. That way you'll pick up stories before anyone else.

She appeared as a castaway on the BBC Radio programme Desert Island Discs on 2 January 1967.

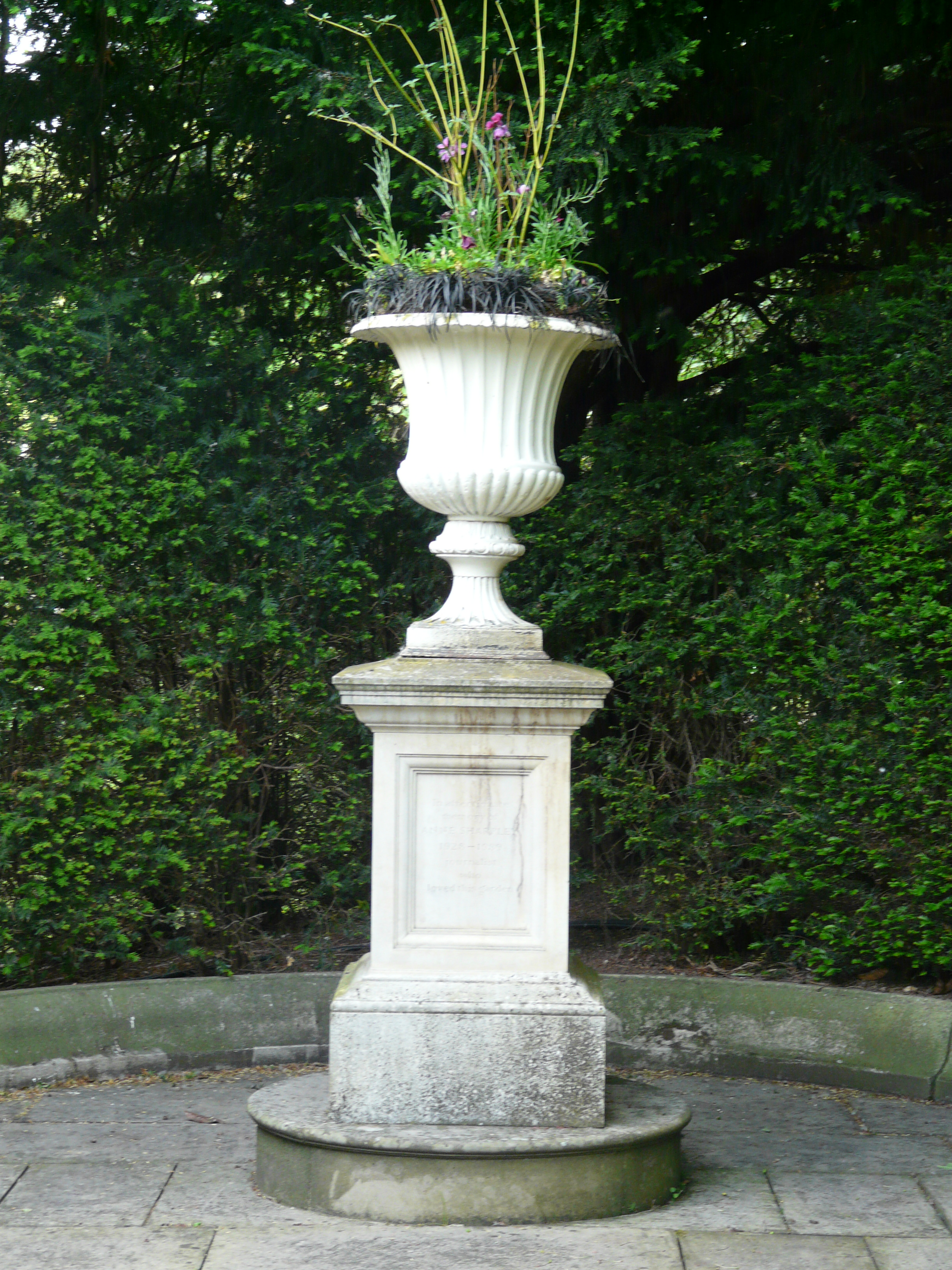
Memorial in St John's Lodge Garden

Six photographs of her, five in a 1961 series by Ida Kar and one from 1965, by Jorge Lewinski, are in the collection of the National Portrait Gallery. A memorial to her, in the form of a planted urn on a stone plinth, stands in St John's Lodge Garden, Regent's Park, London. The plinth is inscribed with the words:

In affectionate
memory of
Anne Sharpley
1928—1989
journalist
who
loved this garden

William Stevenson described how she was nicknamed "Shapely Sharpley" by Randolph Churchill.
