= Dick Chipperfield =

British circus proprietor (1904–1988)

Richard Chipperfield
- Born: 1904
- Died: 1988 (aged 83–84)
- Occupation: circus owner

Richard Chipperfield (21 September 1904 – 3 March 1988) was an English circus animal trainer and circus owner, of the Chipperfield's Circus dynasty. Chipperfield was born in Banbury, Oxfordshire, the son of Richard Chipperfield (8 April 1875 – 8 May 1959) and Emily Maud Seaton (16 August 1883 – 9 October 1974).

Chipperfield appeared as a castaway on the BBC Radio programme Desert Island Discs on 3 August 1964.

He died in Banbury, Oxfordshire, England aged 83.

== Bibliography ==
- —— (1963). My Friends the Animals. Souvenir Press.
