= Cyril Harmer =

British auctioneer and philatelist

Cyril Henry Carrington Harmer
- Born: 1903
- Died: 1986 (aged 82–83)
- Occupations: Auctioneer; philatelist

Cyril Henry Carrington Harmer (1903–1986) was a British auctioneer and philatelist, whose stamp collection has been described as "world famous".

He specialised in collecting 'Newfoundland Airmails'. His collection was sold, by his family firm of auctioneers, Harmers, in West London, on 26 February 2002, for £803,000. He also co-authored a book on air mail stamps.

He appeared as a castaway on the BBC Radio programme Desert Island Discs on 4 August 1969, and in the same year was added to the Philatelic Congress of Great Britain's Roll of Distinguished Philatelists.

== Bibliography ==
- ——; Dalwick, Robert (1953). Newfoundland Air Mails, 1919-1939.
