= Roy MacGregor-Hastie =

British writer (1929–1994)

Roy MacGregor-Hastie (28 March 1929 – 12 February 1994) was a British author, journalist, political commentator, poet, and translator from and into Romanian.

MacGregor-Hastie was born in Manchester in 1929. In the late 1950s and early 1960s he was a regular contributor to the Sunday Express, and his columns were syndicated worldwide by London Express Features. He spoke seven languages, including Russian, was one of the most widely read commentators on Communist affairs, and reported from Moscow, Warsaw, Prague, Budapest and Bucharest. He also broadcast on radio and TV.

He published many books, including biographies of Nikita Khrushchev, Mao Zedong, Charles George Gordon, and Mircea Snegur. His biography of Nikita Khrushchev sold over 150,000 copies, and has been translated into many European languages and Turkish.

He taught at Kingston upon Hull College of Education (now called Hull College of Education) when Cyril Bibby was Principal (1959-1977). MacGregor-Hastie died in 1994.

He appeared as a castaway on the BBC Radio programme Desert Island Discs on 27 July 1964.

== Publications ==
- The Life and Times of Nikita Kruschev (1959); US edition: The Man from Nowhere (1961)
- The Red Barbarians: The Life and Times of Mao Tse-tung (1961)
- Don't Send Me to Omsk! (1961) travel/memoir behind the Iron Curtain
- Pope John XXIII (1962)
- The Day of the Lion: The Rise and Fall of Fascist Italy (1922-1945) (1964)
- Pope Paul VI (1964)
- Signor Roy (1965) autobiography - Italian co-operative farming
- The Mechanics of Power: On Government in Spite of the People (1966)
- The Throne of Peter: A History of the Papacy (1966)
- Africa: Background for Today (1967)
- Anthology of Contemporary Romanian Poetry (1969) editor
- Sweet Swan of Humberside (1972) poetry from Hull Art Centre
- Poems for our Lord and Lady (1976)
- Modern Bulgarian Poetry (1976) translated/co-authored with Bozhidar Bozhilor
- Never to be Taken Alive: A Biography of General Gordon (1985)
- Nell Gwyn (1987)
- Picasso's Women (1989)
