= T. R. Robinson =

20th-century English horologist

T. R. Robinson FBHI was a horologist and an authority on turret clocks. He was a Fellow of the British Horological Institute (FBHI).

Robinson appeared as a castaway on the BBC Radio programme Desert Island Discs on 2 December 1963.

== Publications ==
- "Preservation of Ancient Public Clocks. Antiquarian Interest of Oldest English Machines". The Church Assembly News. September 1938.
