= Writing material =

Writing or drawing surface

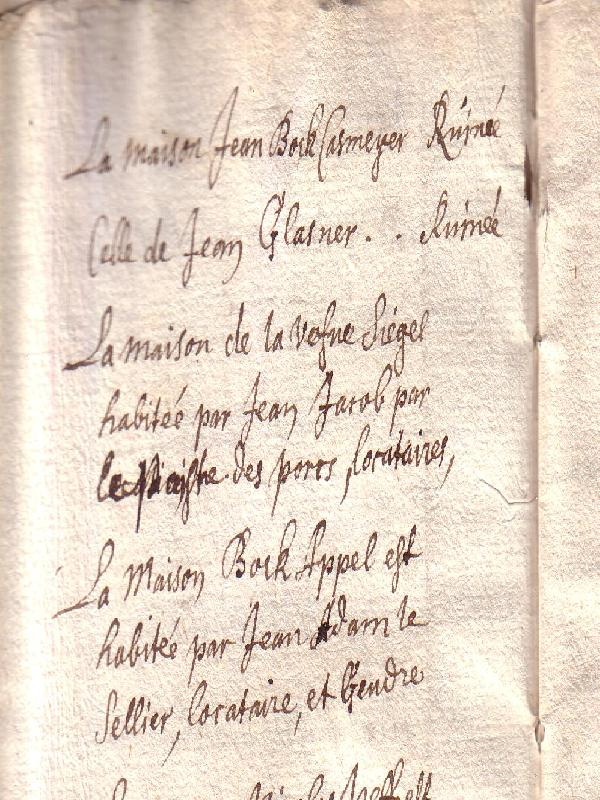
Handwriting on paper; a writing material

A writing material, also called a writing medium, is a surface that can be written on with suitable instruments, or used for symbolic or representational drawings. Building materials on which writings or drawings are produced are not included. The gross characterization of writing materials is by the material constituting the writing surface (for example, paper) and the number, size, usage, and storage configuration of multiple surfaces (for example, paper sheets) into a single object.

== Early media ==
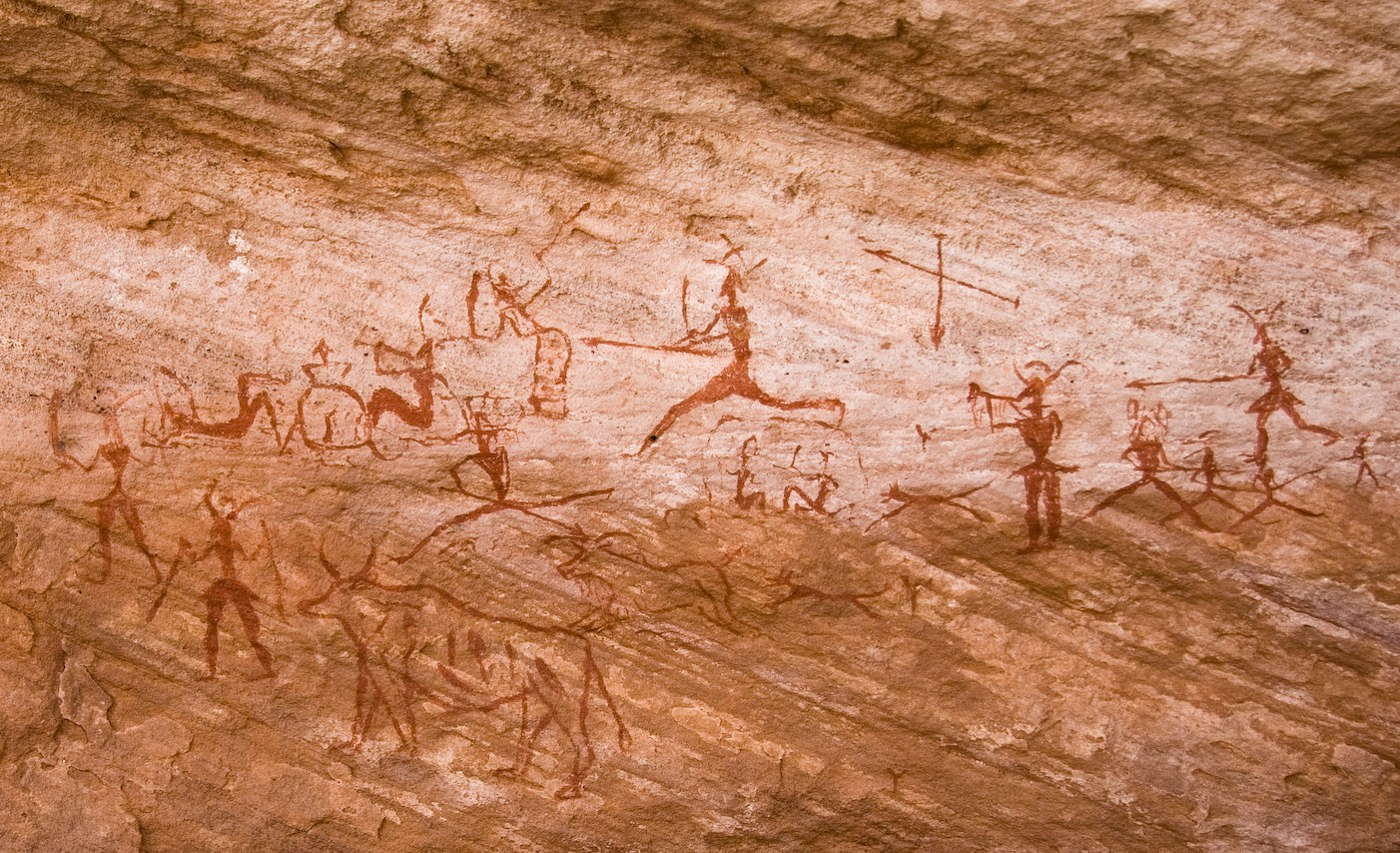
Rock paintings in Libya

Because drawing preceded writing, the first remains of writing materials are the stone walls of the caves on which cave paintings were drawn. Another precursor was tally sticks used to record the count of objects.

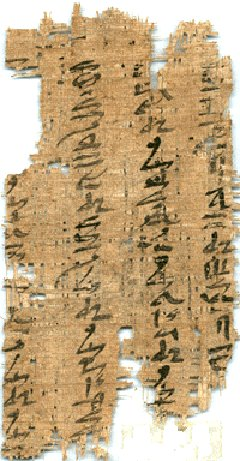
Papyrus fragment from the late Middle Kingdom of Egypt

Writing seems to have become more widespread with the invention of papyrus in Egypt. Parchment, using sheepskins left after the wool was removed for cloth, was sometimes cheaper than papyrus, which had to be imported from outside of Egypt. To save money on expensive papyrus, Egyptians would wash off and reuse it.

Cloth probably shared its mode of use with animal skins. Clay introduces the useful combination of extreme ease of making the inscription with the potential for rendering it fairly permanent. Unglazed pottery can readily accept inscriptions even after firing. The first libraries consisted of archives of the earliest form of writing – the clay tablets in cuneiform script discovered in Ebla in present-day Syria; and in temple rooms in Sumer, present-day Iraq. Wax offers another novel combination of advantages: a reusable surface, easily inscribed and erased, and an easy combination with materials like wood that give it durability. Stone tablets, clay and wooden writing tablets, and wax-covered wooden tablets are some of the first specialized configurations of materials in flat surfaces specifically for writing.

Unglazed pottery shards were used almost as a kind of scratch paper, as ostraka, for tax receipts, and, in Athens, to record the individual nominations of Greek leaders for ostracism.

Papyrus was first used during the 4th millennium BC in Egypt. In the second century BC, it was replaced in parts of the Mediterranean by parchment made from treated animal hides. Parchments used skins from several different animals, and varied significantly in qualities like texture and color. Parchment was ultimately replaced by paper as the latter became more available and less costly.

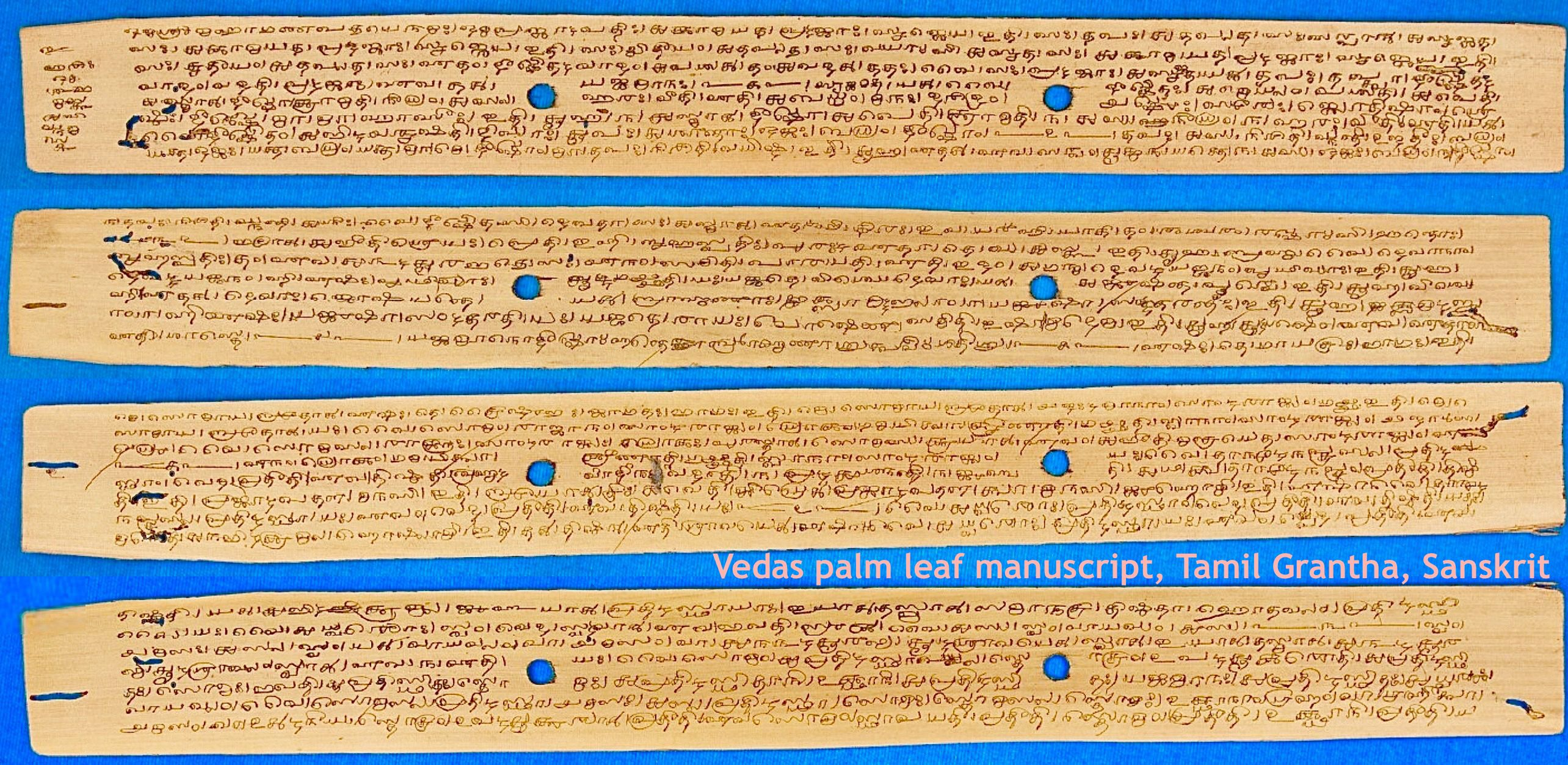
Palm leaf manuscript.

On the Indian subcontinent, principal writing media were bhurjapatra made from birch bark, and palm leaf manuscript. Palm leaf manuscript was also the major source for writing and painting in South and Southeast Asian countries including Nepal, Sri Lanka, Burma, Thailand, Indonesia and Cambodia. The use of paper began only after the 10th century.

In China, early writing materials included animal bones, later silk, and bamboo and wooden slips until the 2nd century when paper was invented. The invention of paper is attributed to a eunuch of the imperial court called Cai Lun in 105 AD. However, paper was not introduced to Europe for another thousand years following a battle in 751 AD where a few paper-makers were captured, and thus the technology spread from Baghdad westward, only reaching Spain in the 12th century.

== Paper ==
Cai Lun used old rags, hemp, tree bark, and fishing nets to develop a method of paper-making fundamentally similar to that still used today.

The Islamic world acquired the art of papermaking in the 8th century, taught by Chinese prisoners who had been taken during eastward expeditions. Eventually, the Muslims brought papermaking to the Indian subcontinent and to Europe. An early Greek name for paper was bagdatikos, meaning 'from Baghdad'. The craft of paper-making reached Spain in the twelfth century, and at subsequent hundred-year intervals arrived in Italy, Germany, and England. Yet for centuries after paper became widely available in Europe, vellum and parchment were preferred for documents that had to be long-lasting. The basic ingredients of paper were linen and cotton, soaked in water and beaten into a smooth pulp, or slurry. As the pulp was drained through a wire screen, the slurry's interlocking fibers matted together, ready for the next step. First, a press squeezed out water from the sheet, preparatory to drying; then, the application of a gelatin coating readied the sheet's surface for ink.

In the late 18th century, paper was still made from cloth gathered by ragpickers. James Whatman and John Baskerville (1706–1775) invented a method for producing perfectly smooth paper using a fine wire mesh that left no lines from the mould on the page.

== Electronic media ==
The Pilot 1000 (1996) was the first consumer product that allowed people to write directly on an electronic screen using a stylus, rather than having to input their writing using a keyboard.
