= Frederick Bodmer =

Frederick Bodmer (actually Friedrich Bodmer) (14 February 1894 – 2 January 1960) was a Swiss philologist and author of the popular book The Loom of Language.

== Life ==
He wrote his PhD thesis in 1924 at University of Zurich on the topic Studies about a dialogue in Nathan by Gotthold Ephraim Lessing (Studien zum Dialog in Lessings Nathan). After that he taught in Europe and at University of Cape Town. Later he held a position within the Department of Modern Languages at Massachusetts Institute of Technology (MIT). He was succeeded in his position at MIT by Noam Chomsky in 1955.

== Bibliography ==
- Frederick Bodmer, The Loom of Language: A Guide To Foreign Languages For The Home Student, London: George Allen & Unwin, 1944 (Primers for the Age of Plenty, No. 3). Edited and arranged by Lancelot Hogben. ISBN 0-393-30034-X.
