= Kim Wall (actor) =

British actor

- Occupation: Actor
- Years active: 1984–present

Kim Wall is a British actor who has appeared in recurring roles in many British comedy series, including The All New Alexei Sayle Show, The Armstrong and Miller Show, Heartburn Hotel, World of Pub, Big Train, Nighty Night, Angelo's and Al Murray's Multiple Personality Disorder.

In film, he has appeared in The War Zone and Holy Flying Circus. In 2004 he played one of the lead roles in a Salford production of Hamish McColl and Sean Foley's The Play What I Wrote. In September 2021, he portrayed the role of Clive Cookson in two episodes of the BBC soap opera Doctors.

== Filmography ==
=== Film ===
Year	Title	Role	Notes
1999	The War Zone	Barman	
1999	The Escort	Hotel Concierge	
2016	Monochrome	Peter	

=== Television ===
Year	Title	Role	Notes
1984	'Allo 'Allo!	German Sentry	Episode 1.3: "Savile Row to the Rescue"
1986	Dempsey and Makepeace	D.C. Fry	Episode 3.4: "The Prizefighter"; Episode 3.8: "The Cortez Connection"
1987	Running Wild	Doctor	Episode 1.2: "The Last of the Red Hot Rock N' Rollers"
1988	Wish Me Luck	RAF Sgt.	1 episode
1988	Boon	Chris	Episode 3.3: "Topspin"
1990–1993	Absolutely	Illtyd/Various	3 episodes
1992	Shakespeare: The Animated Tales	Lysander	"A Midsummer Night's Dream"
1994	The All New Alexei Sayle Show	Various	1 episode
1996	It Happened Next Year	Various	
1996–2003	Barry Welsh Is Coming	Dave Daley/Various	
1997	Armstrong and Miller	Various	
1998	Comedy Nation	Various	
1998	Kiss Me Kate	Nigel	Episode 1.6: "Re-Union"
1998–2000	Heartburn Hotel	Baker	Main role
1999	Murder Most Horrid	Yacht Salesman	Episode 4.2: "Going Solo"
1999	People Like Us		Episode 1.2: "The Estate Agent"
1999	Casualty	Philip Burnley	Episode 14.14: "To Have and to Hold"
1999	The Nearly Complete and Utter History of Everything		Sketch: "When Columbo Discovered America"
2000	Up Rising	Vicar	Episode 1.1: "The Last of England"
2000	Harry Enfield's Brand Spanking New Show	Various	2 episodes
2001	Supergirly	Elvis/Sam/Tom Jones	3 episodes
2001	World of Pub	Various	
2001	'Orrible	Mr. Yarrow	Episode 1.3: "No Sleep 'Til Wembley"
2001	Only Fools and Horses	Justin	Episode 9.1: "If They Could See Us Now.....!"
2002	15 Storeys High		Episode 1.6: "Dead Swan"
2002	Big Train	Various	4 episodes
2002	Doctors	Peter Carter	Episode 4.43: "You Make Me Feel So Young"
2002–2003	Sir Gadabout: The Worst Knight in the Land	King Arthur	Main role
2003	The Harringham Harker	Gordon Knowles	TV film; also writer
2004	Casualty	Ian Hardie	Episode 18.19: "Where There's Life..."
2004	Nighty Night	Mike	3 episodes
2004	Happy Birthday BBC Two	Various	Segment: "Dead Ringers Birthday Treats"
2004	EastEnders	Doctor	2 episodes
2004	My Family	Mr. Donnely	Episode 5.8: "My Fair Charlady"
2005	Don't Watch That, Watch This		1 episode
2005	Broken News	Phil Curdridge	"Look Out East" segments
2006	Heartbeat	Ray Pooley	Episode 15.14: "Risky Business"
2006	Comedy Lab	Dr. Blame	Episode 8.2: "Bad Crowd"
2006	Pulling	Mark	2 episodes
2006	Doctors	Clive Overton	Episode 7.183: "A Question of Time"
2006	The Worst Week of My Life	Mitch	3 episodes: "The Worst Christmas of My Life"
2007	Fear, Stress & Anger	Rev. Jenkins	Episode 1.3: "Stress and Drugs"
2007	Harry & Paul	Various	1 episode
2007	My Family	Store Detective	Episode 7.9: "Life Begins at Fifty"
2007	The IT Crowd	Manager	Episode 2.1: "The Work Outing"
2007	Not Going Out	Bank Manager	Episode 2.1: "Mortgage"
2007	Angelo's	Russell	Main role
2008	The Long Walk to Finchley	Lichfield	TV film
2008	Lab Rats	Les Goodman	Episode 1.2: "A Donor"
2008	Touch Me, I'm Karen Taylor	Various	2 episodes
2009	Grownups	Senior Partner 1/Mr. Lumley	2 episodes
2009	Al Murray's Multiple Personality Disorder	Various	
2010	Zoo Factor	Clive	Episode 1.1: "Top Banana"
2011	Holy Flying Circus	BBC Head of Firing	TV film
2012	Twenty Twelve	Paul Bavington	Episode 2.3: "Clarence House"
2012	Dead Boss	Mr. Bridges	1 episode
2012	Switch	Herbert	1 episode
2013	Badults	Professor	Episode 1.6: "Past"
2015	UKIP: The First 100 Days	Ralph	TV film
2015	Chewing Gum	Henry	Episode 1.4: "The Unicorn"
2016	Siblings	Dr. Jacerby	Episode 2.1: "Kevin Rugby"
2016	Plebs	Paeon	Episode 3.5: "The Crimewave"; Episode 3.6: "Jugball"
2016	Tracey Ullman's Show	Various	2 episodes
2016	Morgana Robinson's The Agency	Director	1 episode
2017	Coronation Street	Gus Radcliffe	2 episodes
2017	The Windsors	Terry	1 episode
2019	GameFace	George	1 episode
2020	Maxxx	Priest	Episode 1.1: "Guess Who's Back?"
2021	Sliced	Posh Man	Episode 2.5: "Graham?"
2021	Doctors	Clive Cookson	Episode 22.74: "Booty or Bust: Part 1"; Episode 22.75: "Booty or Bust: Part 2"

=== Radio ===
Year	Title	Role	Notes
1987	East Lynne	Richard Hare	
1988	The Wonderful Visit	The Storyteller	
1988	Well, At Least It Didn't Rain	David	
1988	For King and Country	2nd Lieutenant Hargreaves	
1990	The Island of Doctor Moreau	Prentice	
1993	Unofficial Rosie	Andrew	
1996	Beaumarchais	Various	
1996	King Solomon's Carpet	Jarvis	
1996	A Handful of Dust	Ambrose	
1997	Imperial Palace	Mr. Rowbottom	
1997	Mansfield Park	Tom Bertram	
1998	The Alan Davies Show	Various	
1998	Curious, If True	Philip	Episode: "The Poor Clare"
1998–1999	World of Pub	Various	
1999	The Mark Steel Lectures	Various	
2001	Married	Various	
2001	Think the Unthinkable	Various	
2001–2002	The Leopard in Autumn	Various	
2002	Linda Smith's A Brief History of Timewasting	Various	
2004	Absolute Power	Various	
2005	Be Prepared	Miles Rummings	Main role
2006	Daunt and Dervish	Various	
2006	Weak at the Top	Various	
2006	High Table, Lower Orders		
2006	Hercule Poirot	Michael	Story: "Mrs. McGinty's Dead"
2006	The Man Who Built Tunnels	Wheatley	
2006	Falco	Appius Pricillus	Story: "Venus in Copper"
2006	The Balloonists	George Hansum	
2007	Inspector Steine	Ventriloquist Vince	
2007–2011	Listen Against	Various	
2007–2010	Ed Reardon's Week	Various	
2008	The Casebook of Inspector Steine	Ventriloquist Vince	
2009	Andy Zaltzman's History of the Third Millennium	Various	
2009	Baring Up	Brian	
2010	Scorched	Bern	
2012	Doctor Who: Destination Nerva	Jim Hooley/Drelleran 1/Security Guard	Audio drama
2013	Nineteen Eighty-Four	Parsons	
2015	Affairs of Death	Desiderius	
2016	Barry's Lunch Club	Derek	
2016	Northanger Abbey	Mr. Allen	
