= In the Red =

In the Red may refer to:

== Literature ==
- In the Red (novel), a novel by Mark Tavener
- "In the Red", a storyline in the science fiction comedy webtoon series Live with Yourself!

== Film and radio ==
- In the Red (radio series), a 1995 BBC black comedy-crime drama series based on the novel
- In the Red (TV series), a 1998 BBC black comedy-crime drama series based on the novel

== Music ==
- In the Red (EP), an EP by A Global Threat
- In the Red (Tina Dico album), a 2006 album
- "In the Red", a 2019 or 2020 Raye Zagazora song under her album Red
- In the Red (Kind of Like Spitting album), a 2005 album
- In the Red (Crucified Barbara album), a 2014 album by Crucified Barbara
- In the Red Records, an American record label
