= Claire Rayner =

English journalist and advice columnist (1931–2010)

Claire Rayner OBE
- Born: Claire Berenice Berkovitch (later Chetwynd); 22 January 1931; Stepney, London, England
- Died: 11 October 2010 (aged 79); Harrow, London, England
- Education: City of London School for Girls
- Occupations: Journalist, broadcaster, novelist, nurse
- Years active: 1949–2010
- Spouse: Desmond Rayner (m. 1957)
- Children: Jay Rayner, Amanda, Adam

Claire Berenice Rayner, OBE (/ˈreɪnər/; née Berkovitch, later Chetwynd; 22 January 1931 – 11 October 2010) was an English journalist, broadcaster, novelist and nurse, best known for her role for many years as an advice columnist.

== Early life ==
Rayner was born to Jewish parents in Stepney, London, the eldest of four children. Her father was a tailor and her mother a housewife. Her father had adopted the surname Chetwynd, under which name she was educated at the City of London School for Girls.

Rayner's autobiography, How Did I Get Here from There?, was published in 2003, and revealed details of a childhood marred by physical and mental cruelty at the hands of her parents. After the family emigrated to Canada, in 1945 she was placed in a psychiatric hospital by her parents, and treated for 15 months for a thyroid defect.

== Career ==
=== Nursing ===
Returning to the UK in 1951, Rayner trained as a nurse at the Royal Northern Hospital and Guy's Hospital in London. She intended to become a physician; while training as a nurse, however, she met actor Desmond Rayner, whom she married in 1957. The couple lived in London and Claire worked as a midwife and later nursing sister.

=== Journalist and writer ===
Rayner wrote her first letter to Nursing Times in 1958, on nurses' pay and conditions. She then began regularly writing to The Daily Telegraph on themes of patient care or nurses' pay. She began writing novels soon after her marriage, and by 1968 had published more than 25 books.

The birth of her first child in 1960 meant that she found full-time nursing difficult, and therefore turned to a full-time writing career. Initially writing articles for magazines and publications, in 1968 she published one of the earliest sex manuals, People in Love, which brought her to national attention. Despite the "explicit" content, the work was commended for its "down-to-earth" and "sensible" approach.

By the 1970s, Rayner had established herself in writing for Woman's Own as one of four new and direct "agony aunts", alongside Marjorie Proops, Peggy Makins (aka Evelyn Home) at Woman and J. Firbank of Forum. Her advice in the teenaged girls' magazine Petticoat caused controversy. In 1972, she was accused of "encouraging masturbation and promiscuity in prepubescent girls". Her direct and frank approach led the BBC to ask her to be the first person on British pre-watershed television to demonstrate how to put on a condom, and she was one of the first people used by advertisers to promote sanitary towels.

The year after beginning to appear on Pebble Mill at One, Rayner started an agony column in The Sun in 1973, but left to join the Sunday Mirror in 1980, when she also made her second television series of Claire Rayner's Casebook. She left the Sunday Mirror shortly after the appointment of Eve Pollard as editor, and joined the Today newspaper for three years. Rayner was named medical journalist of the year in 1987.

Rayner was an agony aunt on TV-am in the late 1980s and early 1990s. She made aimed to reply to every letter she received. This part of her work was not funded by the station.

She was the subject of This Is Your Life in 1989, when she was surprised by Michael Aspel.

=== Campaigner ===
Rayner became president of the Patients Association, and through her extensive charity work and writings was appointed OBE in 1996 for services to women's health and wellbeing and to health matters. Rayner had a very personal reason for supporting Sense's Older Person campaign, wearing hearing aids in both ears, and also had age-related dry macular degeneration (AMD), a form of sight loss common in older people.

Between 1993 and 2002, Rayner was one of the patrons of the Herpes Viruses Association and chaired a Press Briefing in June 1993 aimed at destigmatising genital herpes. When tendering her resignation, she cited the fact that she was patron of 60 organisations as the reason for trimming the list.

Rayner was appointed to UK government committees on health, and consequently wrote a chapter in The Future of the NHS. Despite being president of the Patients Association, Rayner used private health care. She was a member of the Labour government's Royal Commission on the Care of the Elderly. In 1999, Rayner was appointed to a committee responsible for reviewing the medical conditions at Holloway Prison, London, at the direction of Paul Boateng who was then the Minister for Prisons. The recommendations of this committee led to far-reaching changes in the provision of medical care within Holloway. She also sat on the Prime Minister's independent commission on nursing and midwifery that published the Front Line Care (Report) in 2010.

A lifelong Labour Party supporter, she resigned in 2001 and joined the Liberal Democrats in fear of the proposed changes to the NHS in the administration of Prime Minister Tony Blair. Rayner was also a prominent supporter of the British republican movement, although admitted her dual standards on accepting her OBE in 1996.

Rayner was President (and subsequently Vice-President) of the British Humanist Association, a Distinguished Supporter of the Humanist Society Scotland and an Honorary Associate of the National Secular Society. In the weeks before her death, Rayner had the following to say about Pope Benedict XVI's state visit to the United Kingdom:

I have no language with which to adequately describe Joseph Alois Ratzinger, AKA the Pope. In all my years as a campaigner I have never felt such animus against any individual as I do against this creature. His views are so disgusting, so repellent and so hugely damaging to the rest of us, that the only thing to do is to get rid of him.

Rayner's position as a patron of the Down's Syndrome Association was promptly terminated in 1995. She had queried parents' decision to have a disabled child:

The hard facts are that it is costly in terms of human effort, compassion, energy, and finite resources such as money, to care for individuals with handicaps (and to hell with political correctness; there is more to these dilemmas than mere 'learning difficulties').

It was a response to the decision of journalist Dominic Lawson and his wife not to have a test determining the health of the foetus during a pregnancy and thus, following one potential result, rejecting outright the option of a termination. It was published shortly after the birth of the couple's disabled daughter.

== Personal life ==
Rayner met her husband, actor Desmond Rayner, at Maccabi in Hampstead; the couple married in 1957. They had three children together: writer and food critic Jay Rayner, electronics reviewer, angling and motoring journalist Adam Rayner and events manager Amanda Rayner.

Rayner was found to have breast cancer in 2002 at the age of 71. She became a breast cancer activist to promote the work of the charity Cancer Research UK. She also suffered from Graves' disease and became a patron of the British Thyroid Foundation in 1994.

Rayner never recovered from emergency intestinal surgery undertaken in May 2010, and died in hospital on 11 October 2010. She told her relatives she wanted her last words to be: "Tell David Cameron that if he screws up my beloved NHS I'll come back and bloody haunt him."

== Publications ==
Rayner was a prolific author of both fiction and non-fiction.

=== Fiction ===
==== Performers ====
- Gower Street (1973)
- The Haymarket (1974)
- Paddington Green (1975)
- Soho Square (1976)
- Bedford Row (1977)
- Long Acre (1978)
- Charing Cross (1979)
- The Strand (1980)
- Chelsea Reach (1982)
- Shaftesbury Avenue (1983)
- Piccadilly (1985)
- Seven Dials (1986)

==== Poppy Chronicles ====
- Jubilee (1987)
- Flanders (1988)
- Flapper (1988)
- Blitz (1988)
- Festival (1988)
- Sixties (1988)

==== George Barnabas ====
- First Blood (1993)
- Second Opinion (1994)
- Third Degree (1995)
- Fourth Attempt (1996)
- Fifth Member (1997)

==== Quentin Quartet ====
- London Lodgings (1994)
- Paying Guests (1995)

==== Novels ====
- The House on the Fen (1967)
- Starch of Aprons (1967)
- Lady Mislaid (1968)
- Death on the Table (1969)
- The Meddlers (1970)
- A Time to Heal (1972)
- The Burning Summer (1972)
- Reprise (1980)
- The Running Years (1981)
- The Enduring Years (1982)
- Trafalgar Square (1982)
- Family Chorus (1984)
- The Virus Man (1985)
- Sisters (1986)
- Lunching at Laura's (1986)
- Maddie (1988)
- Children's Ward, the Lonely One, Private Wing (1988)
- Postscripts (1991)
- Dangerous Things (1993)
- The Final Year (1993)
- Cottage Hospital (1993)
- Company (1993)
- The Doctors of Downlands (1994)
- Nurse in the Sun (1994)
- The Lonely One (1995)
- Children's Ward (1995)
- The Private Wing (1996)
- The Legacy (1997)
- The Inheritance (1998)

=== Non-fiction ===
- What Happens in Hospital (1963)
- Essentials of Outpatient Nursing (1967)
- One Hundred and One Facts an Expectant Mother Should Know (1967)
- For Children (1967)
- Housework the Easy Way (1967)
- One Hundred and One Key Facts on Baby Care (1967)
- Shall I Be a Nurse? (1967)
- People in Love: Modern Guide to Sex in Marriage (1968)
- Parent's Guide to Sex Education (1968)
- Woman's Medical Dictionary (1971)
- About Sex (1972)
- When to Call the Doctor: What to Do Whilst Waiting (1972)
- Child Care (1973)
- Shy Person's Book (1973)
- Where Do I Come from?: Answers to a Child's Questions About Sex (1974)
- Independent Television's Kitchen Garden (1976)
- Atlas of the Body and Mind (1976)
- Claire Rayner Answers Your 100 Questions on Pregnancy (1977)
- Family Feelings: Understanding Your Child from 0 to 5 (1977)
- Body Book (1978)
- Related to Sex: Talking About Sexual Feelings within Your Family (1979)
- Independent Television's Greenhouse Gardening (1979)
- Everything Your Doctor Would Tell You If He Had the Time (1980)
- Baby and Young Child Care: A Practical Guide to Parents of Children Aged 0–5 Years (1981)
- Growing Pains and How to Avoid Them (1984)
- Marriage Guide (1984)
- The Getting Better Book (1985)
- Claire Rayner's Lifeguide: A Commonsense Approach to Modern Living (1985)
- When I Grow Up (1986)
- Woman (1986)
- Safe Sex (1987)
- The Don't Spoil Your Body Book (1989)
- Clinical Judgements (1989)
- Life and Love and Everything (1993)
- Grandparenting Today: Making the Most of Your Grandparenting Skills With Grandchildren of All Ages (1997)
- How Did I Get Here from There? (2003)
