= His Master's Voice (radio series) =

- Genre: Satirical comedy-drama
- Running time: 28 minutes
- Country of origin: United Kingdom
- Language(s): English
- Home station: BBC Radio 4
- Starring: Tony Gardner; Robert Hardy; Amelia Bullmore; Michael Maloney
- Written by: Mark Tavener; Steve Punt
- Produced by: Dawn Ellis
- Recording studio: The Drill Hall
- Original release: 4 July – 25 July 2007
- No. of series: 1
- No. of episodes: 4

His Master's Voice is a satirical comedy series on BBC Radio 4. It is written by both Mark Tavener, who also wrote the satirical novel In The Red and the satirical radio series Absolute Power, and Steve Punt. Their writing satirises both the hard-right Conservatism and "caring Conservatism", along with the rest of British politics. Following Tavener's death in October 2007, no new series have been produced.

== Plot ==
It is set in the office of a Conservative magazine called "The Blue Touch Paper" owned by South African media mogul Lord Malan (Robert Hardy). To revive its failing sales, Malan hires a new editor Keith (Tony Gardner), who was previously the "token Tory" at the left-wing Guardian (and is thus nicknamed "Toynbee", after Polly Toynbee from the Guardian, by Malan). This angers Anna (Amelia Bullmore), the magazine's political commentator (and its acting editor for the last 3 months), who had been hoping to become full editor.

Much to the discontent of Malan and Anna, Keith then moves the magazine away from its traditional hard-right standpoint to views more in line with David Cameron's new "caring Conservatism", such as environmentalism. Anna, Malan and hard-right Tory backbenchers therefore try to ensure that Keith fails to make a success of the paper, often using Malan's three other national papers to do so. However, their attempts usually backfire, with Keith's brand of conservatism increasing rather than decreasing the readership.

== Episodes ==
1. The magazine has become so Blue that it is sadly out of touch, with a declining and ageing readership. The time has come to appoint a new editor who favours compassionate Cameron conservatism.
2. Following a successful first edition, Keith decides that this week's Blue Touch should focus on the Tory's green agenda, much to the chagrin of Lord Malan who spends his life on planes and likes watching ice melt.
3. Keith decides that it's time for a Gordon Brown Special, but can the team unite on the angle they take and avoid just being rude about Scotland? And how will Giles contribute when he's busy testing 25 different whiskies for a consumer comparison article?
4. Much to Keith's disgust, Lord Malan decides that he wants a globalization special with a celebrity angle. Giles finds himself covering the topic in a burger bar.

== Quotations ==
- first line – Malan – Life's too short to read the Guardian.

== Production and broadcast ==
The series was recorded at The Drill Hall in London on 16 May and 22 May 2007, and was broadcast on Wednesday evenings at 6.30pm between 4 July and 25 July 2007.

== Cast ==
- Lord Malan, old-fashioned Tory and owner of The Blue Touch – Robert Hardy
- Keith, the editor, formerly the "Token Tory" for The Guardian – Tony Gardner
- Anna, vicious, right-wing political columnist and current acting editor – Amelia Bullmore
- Giles, the paper's plummy gossip columnist, nicknamed "the Louche" – Michael Maloney
- Katrina, PA and party worker – Rachel Atkins
- With Beth Chalmers, Simon Treves, Eve Webster

== Cultural references ==
- "Blue Touch" is a reference to the instructions formerly written on the side of most fireworks, usually "light the blue touch paper and retire immediately"; the "blue touch paper" being the "fuse" used to light the firework. Blue is historically the color most associated with the Conservative Party and, from the early 1980s until September 2006, the Conservative Party's own logo had been a torch. (BBC News Online article)
- Lord Malan, a South African media mogul, combines elements of real media moguls born in the former British Empire, notably Rupert Murdoch from Australia, Roy Thomson from Canada, and his fellow Canadian Conrad Black. In fiction, he echoes the characters of Lambert Leroux in the stage play Pravda, and Robert Hardy's role as Twiggy Rathbone in the TV comedy Hot Metal.
