= American Reel =

- Directed by: Mark Archer
- Written by: Junior Burke; Scott Fivelson
- Produced by: Mark Archer; Scott Fivelson; Darrell Griffin; Jordan Rush
- Starring: David Carradine; Michael Maloney; Mariel Hemingway
- Cinematography: Tony Hettinger
- Edited by: George Kelly Jr.
- Music by: Thom Bishop
- Distributed by: Liberation Entertainment
- Release date: 1999: November 4, 2003 (DVD)
- Running time: 100 min.
- Country: United States
- Language: English

American Reel is a 1999 drama film directed by Mark Archer and starring David Carradine, Michael Maloney, and Mariel Hemingway. Written by Junior Burke and Scott Fivelson, the film is set in Chicago, Illinois, though primary filming locations included Fort Wayne, Indiana, Waterloo, Indiana, and Hicksville, Ohio.

The film, which features Carradine singing five of his original songs, has been heralded as a "tailor-made" showcase of the late actor's little-known musical work.

== Synopsis ==
Country singer James Lee Springer (Carradine) has just become an overnight sensation—after 20 years of trying to make it by playing every honky-tonk west (and east) of the Big Muddy. But after so many years of waiting and hoping, the only question is whether it's all worth it.

== Cast ==
- David Carradine as James Lee Springer
- Michael Maloney as Jason Fields
- Mariel Hemingway as Disney Rifkin
- Marina Anderson as Commercial Director
- Larissa Borkowski as Natasha
- Troy Clark as James' Cousin
- Kevin Ferguson as Tony Marty
- Mike Leonardo as Music Video Director
- Melissa Long as Entertainment Reporter
- Willy T. Ribbs as Jason's Attorney
- Mark Schiff as Marvin Ayres
- Rebecca Shea as Legal Secretary
- Matt Socia as Blair Whiteman
- Carrie Wellman as Radio Interviewer (uncredited)

== DVD ==
The DVD of the film was released in 2003 and contains interviews with the cast, and a behind the scenes gallery of photos. In 2012, the film was re-released and made available on streaming services such as Netflix and Amazon Prime Video.

== Reprises ==
Though the film was initially released with little publicity, it has become appreciated by Carradine's more loyal fans, and has been screened multiple times since the actor's passing.

- On December 8, 2011, Quentin Tarantino's New Beverly Cinema included the film in a double screening with Kill Bill: Volume 2 as part of an annual tribute to David Carradine and his work. The film was chosen because it helped highlight Carradine's little-known musical work, and the event included performances by the re-incarnation of Carradine's musical band "The Cosmic Rescue Team.
- On September 7, 2012, the Los Angeles County Department of Parks and Recreation screened the film in Pershing Square in Downtown Los Angeles as part of the department's "Under the Sheet Music" outdoor film series.

== See also ==
- Cinema of the United States
