= Phil Hammond =

British General Practitioner, broadcaster, and journalist

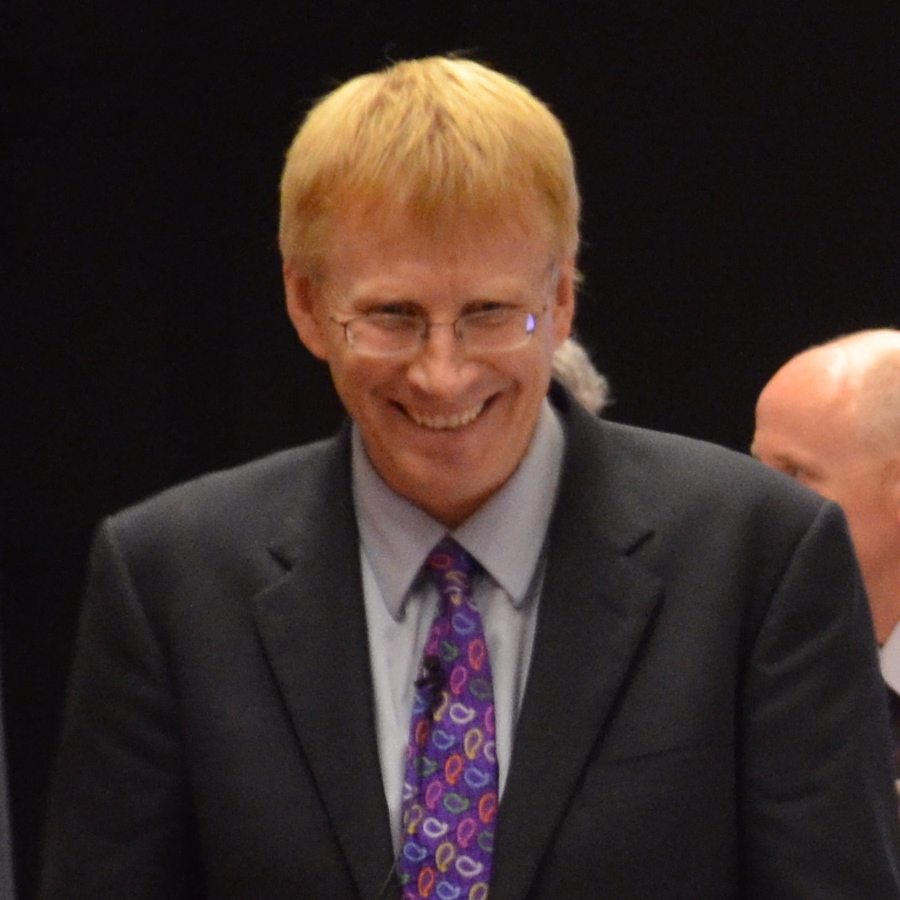
- Hammond in 2011
- Born: 1 January 1962 (age 64); England
- Education: Girton College, Cambridge; St Thomas' Hospital Medical School
- Occupation: Physician
- Known for: Broadcaster and journalist
- Website: www.drphilhammond.com

Philip James Hammond (born 1 January 1962) is a British physician, broadcaster, comedian and commentator on health issues in the United Kingdom. He is best known for his humorous commentary on the National Health Service. He first came into the public spotlight writing a column for The Independent newspaper, where he wrote with a strong pro-patient rights line, and as Private Eye's medical correspondent "MD".

== Early life and education ==
Hammond lived in Australia until the age of seven when his Australian father, Barrie Rees Hammond, Ph.D., a Cambridge-educated physical chemist, killed himself at the age of 38. His English mother moved the family back to England. Hammond was educated at Marlborough Royal Free Grammar School until its closure in 1975, then at its successor St John's Comprehensive, before obtaining a place at Marlborough College as his father had taught there.

Hammond qualified as a doctor in 1987, having studied at Girton College, Cambridge and St Thomas' Hospital Medical School, London.

== Medical career ==
Hammond has worked as a lecturer in Medical Communication at the Universities of Birmingham and Bristol. He previously worked as a GP before retraining as an associate specialist in chronic fatigue syndrome.

== Broadcasting and performances ==
He starred in his own show 59 Minutes to save the NHS at the Edinburgh Fringe and was one of two doctor-cum-comics who captained teams on a Channel Five medical quiz, Tibs and Fibs, hosted by Tony Slattery.

As well as appearing on Channel 4's longest running programme, Countdown, Hammond has starred in the BBC Two TV series Trust Me, I'm a Doctor and in the BBC Radio 4 series Struck Off and Die and 28 Minutes to Save the NHS. He has appeared on the BBC TV news quiz Have I Got News for You, as well as the original and longer-running The News Quiz on BBC Radio 4 and The Now Show on the same station. He also writes the Medicine Balls column in Private Eye, under the pseudonym "M.D." (use of pseudonyms is routine for Private Eye's regular columnists).

He presents the Music Group on BBC Radio 4 and was a regular contributor to Gabby Logan's Sunday morning show on BBC Radio 5 Live. He also has a Saturday mid-morning show on BBC Radio Bristol between 9 am and 12 noon.

Hammond toured the UK between 2011 and 13 with Dr Phil's Rude Health Show, which was released on DVD in two parts: Dr Phil's Rude Health Show and Confessions of a Doctor. They were broadcast of BBC Radio 4 Extra in August 2011. He returned to the Edinburgh Fringe for the eighth time in 2011.

In September 2013 he began touring the UK with a new show, Games to Play with Your Doctor.

Hammond did two shows at the 2016 Edinburgh Fringe: Life and Death (But Mainly Death) and Dr Phil's NHS Revolution. He toured them together as Dr Phil's Health Revolution in 2017.

=== Non-medical broadcasting ===
Hammond co-presented The Heaven and Earth Show on BBC One with Juliet Morris in 2000. He presented two series for BBC Radio 4 of Pillories of the State in 1999/2000 and presents the Music Group, also on Radio 4 (sixth series 2011). Hammond has also frequently appeared as a guest in the Dictionary Corner on Countdown.

Hammond was a presenter for BBC Radio Bristol from 2007, broadcasting on Saturday mornings until, on 21 August 2018, he was sacked from the show, after announcing his intention to stand for election as an MP for the National Health Action Party, in the constituency of Jacob Rees-Mogg.

== Writing ==
Hammond was one of those who broke the story about the Bristol heart scandal in 1992 and was later called to give evidence at the subsequent enquiry.

In 2009, Hammond broke allegations about pathology misdiagnosis in Bristol, the subject of an independent inquiry chaired by Jane Mishcon. He also campaigned for an inquiry into the sacking of Cornwall Council chief executive John Watkinson. His Private Eye columns are available on his website.

In July 2011, Hammond co-authored a Private Eye special investigation with Andrew Bousfield called Shoot the Messenger, exposing the shocking treatment of NHS whistleblowers and how large sums of public money are used to silence them and cover up their concerns. It triggered an early day motion in Parliament by Peter Bottomley, MP. Hammond and Bousfield also launched a website dedicated to NHS staff, patients and relatives who have highlighted concerns about safety in the NHS. They were involved in referring Barbara Hakin to the General Medical Council.

Hammond co-authored Trust Me, I'm a Doctor (Metro Books) with Michael Mosley, the executive producer of the BBC2 series of the same name. There are two editions (1999 and 2002), both out of print. Hammond is the sole author of Medicine Balls – Consultations with the World's Greatest TV Doctor (2007, 2008) and Trust Me, I'm (Still) a Doctor (2008, 2009) and Sex, Sleep or Scrabble? – Seriously Funny Answers to Life's Quirkiest Questions (2009, 2010) and What Doctors Really Think...16 Years of Wit, Wisdom, and Lies (2014). His most recent book is Staying Alive: How to Get the Best From the NHS

With David Spicer, Hammond wrote a four-part BBC Radio 4 satire called Polyoaks, about GPs struggling with the then-government's NHS reforms. First broadcast in June 2011, it starred Nigel Planer, Tony Gardner, Celia Imrie, David Westhead, Carla Mendonça, David Holt, Phil Cornwell and Kate O'Sullivan, with a second series of four transmitted in 2012. Spicer and Hammond's third series of four episodes of Polyoaks ran on BBC Radio 4 from 6 June 2014. The fourth series, consisting of six episodes, was broadcast in 2016. A fifth series was commissioned for broadcast in 2017.

In 1999, he was reported to the General Medical Council by William Hague's press secretary over an article he wrote about Hague's slow recovery from a cold. He writes for the Mendip Times, celebrating life on the Mendips and in surrounding areas.

In 2021, he published Dr Hammond's Covid Casebook, a collection of 30 of his fortnightly columns in Private Eye which formed a detailed analysis of the management of the COVID-19 pandemic in England.

== Politics ==
While a junior doctor, Hammond contested the 1992 general election under the title "Struck Off and Die Doctors Alliance". He ran in the Bristol West constituency against William Waldegrave, the then Secretary of State for Health, capturing 87 votes.

In August 2018 he announced his intention to stand for election as an MP for the National Health Action Party, in the North East Somerset constituency of Jacob Rees-Mogg. As a result, the BBC sacked him from his Bristol radio show.

== Other roles ==
Hammond is vice-president of the Patients Association and a patron of Meningitis UK, the Doctors Support Network, the Herpes Viruses Association, Patients First and Kissing It Better. He is an advisor for the Association of Young People with ME and a champion for the Point of Care Foundation. He is also a patron of My Death, My Decision, an organisation which seeks a more compassionate approach to dying in the UK, including giving people the legal right to a medically assisted death if that is their persistent wish.
