= Mark Tavener =

British writer (1954–2007)

- Born: Mark Adrian Tavener; 8 July 1954; Plymouth, Devon, England
- Died: 18 October 2007 (aged 53); Plymouth, Devon, England
- Education: Peterhouse, Cambridge
- Occupation: Writer
- Writing career
- Genres: comedy, satire

Mark Adrian Tavener (8 July 1954 – 18 October 2007) was an English writer, humorist, and dramatist best known for his BBC radio and television series In the Red (BBC Radio Four, 1995-1999/BBC Two, 1998) and Absolute Power (BBC Radio Four, 2000-2006/BBC Two 2005–2007), both of which came out of his PG Wodehouse Prize nominated novel In the Red (Hutchinson, 1989).

== Biography ==
Tavener was born and brought up in Plymouth and educated at Plymouth College, before attending Peterhouse, Cambridge.

=== In the Red franchise ===
In the Red
- Original work: In the Red (1989)

Films and television
- Television series: In the Red (1998)

Audio
- Radio program(s): In the Red (1995); In the Balance (1997); In the Chair (1998); In the End (1999)

Tavener wrote a satirical novel, In the Red (Hutchinson, 1989), about fictional BBC Crime Reporter George Cragge's investigation into the serial killing of London bank managers, a small political party contesting a by-election, and a plan to overthrow the Director-General of the BBC, drawing on his early experiences working for the BBC and the Liberal Party. Working with comedy-writer Peter Baynham he later adapted this into a seven-part radio series of the same name (BBC Radio 4, 1995), which was produced by Paul Schlesinger. He reunited with Schlesinger for the six-part sequel series In the Balance (BBC Radio 4, 1997), about George Cragge's investigation into a series of murders during a FIFA World Cup at Wembley Stadium, a summit of EU leaders and an upcoming general election, which he wrote alone. The three-part television series In the Red (BBC Two, 1998), was adapted by Malcolm Bradbury without input from Tavener, who was working with Schlesinger on a second six-part sequel series In the Chair (BBC Radio 4, 1998), about George Cragge's investigation into a series of murders of dentists linked to New Labour policy. A third and final six-part sequel series In the End (BBC Radio 4, 1999), about George Cragge's investigation into a series of murders of journalists, was written by Tavener and produced by Schlesinger and Dawn Ellis.

=== Absolute Power franchise ===
Absolute Power

Films and television
- Television series: Absolute Power (2003–2005)

Audio
- Radio program(s): Absolute Power (2000–2006)

Tavener reunited with executive producer Paul Schlesinger and producer Dawn Ellis to create the spin-off series Absolute Power (BBC Radio Four, 2000–2006) featuring the supporting characters of Charles Prentis and Martin McCabe from In the Red and its sequels In the Chair and In the End, who having left their previous positions as BBC executives have set up their own public relations firm. After three series on radio, Schlesinger produced a television adaptation of the same name (BBC Two, 2003–2005), although, as with In the Red, Tavener was not involved in the writing of this. Following a one-year break for production of the first series of the television adaptation, Tavener reunited with Ellis for the fourth and final series of the original radio programme. A second and final series of the television adaptation followed without input from Tavener. The franchise was later brought to a conclusion in a one-off radio special written by Tavener and produced by Ellis.

=== Later works & death ===
Between Absolute Power's final radio series and the one-off special, Tavener and producer Dawn Ellis created two six-part series of High Table, Lower Orders (BBC Radio Four, 2005–2006), featuring a murder mystery at a Cambridge College similar to the one the writer had attended.

His final work was a collaboration with the comedian Steve Punt on the four-part series, His Master's Voice (BBC Radio Four, 2007), set in the offices of a fictional Conservative magazine, which was produced by Dawn Ellis.

Tavener died of cancer on 18 October 2007.

== Works ==
=== Novel ===
- In the Red (Hutchinson, 1989) ISBN 0-0917-4356-7

=== Radio Series ===
- In the Red (BBC Radio 4, 1995) released on audio cassette (BBC Audio, 1998) ISBN 0-5633-8807-2
- In the Balance (BBC Radio 4, 1997)
- In the Chair (BBC Radio 4, 1998)
- In the End (BBC Radio 4, 1999)
- Absolute Power: Series 1 (BBC Radio 4, 2000)
- Absolute Power: Series 2 (BBC Radio 4, 2001)
- Absolute Power: Series 3 (BBC Radio 4, 2002)
- Absolute Power: Series 4 (BBC Radio 4, 2004)
- High Table, Lower Orders: Series 1 (BBC Radio 4, 2005)
- High Table, Lower Orders: Series 2 (BBC Radio 4, 2006)
- Absolute Power: Special (BBC Radio 4, 2006)
- His Master's Voice (BBC Radio 4, 2007)

=== Television series ===
- In the Red (BBC Two, 1998)
- Absolute Power: Series 1 (BBC Two, 2003)
- Absolute Power: Series 2 (BBC Two, 2005)
