= Adab al-Kudya =

Genre of classical Arabic literature

- Stylistic origins: Classical Arabic literature
- Cultural origins: Abbasid Caliphate (9th–13th century)
- Popularity: Medieval Islamic world

Adab al-Kudya is a genre of classical Arabic literature often referred to as the literature of trickery, begging, or the art of persuasive solicitation. The term kudya comes from the Arabic root ajda, meaning “to ask” or "to request".

== Development ==
During the later Abbasid era, begging took on the form of a social phenomenon, eventually evolving into a literary genre in its own right, complete with its own writers, poets, and captivated audiences.

This genre was sometimes known as al-Sāsāniyya, a reference to the ancient Persian Sasanian dynasty. Many of those who engaged in kudya claimed to be descendants of the Sasanian royal line, hoping to evoke sympathy and generosity from others. Given the widespread political turmoil and uncertainty across the Islamic world at the time, people were often willing to believe these elaborate stories.

Adab al-Kudya played a key role in the rise of the celebrated Arabic literary form maqāmāt, a blend of prose and poetry featuring witty, roguish characters navigating various social situations. Many of the most renowned kuddyāʾ (those who practiced kudya) were authors of maqāmāt.

== Literary examples ==
Verses by one of the prominent poets of al-kudya, al-Ahnaf al-ʿAkbarī:

I’ve found that poetry serves no use at all,
When the flour is gone, and hunger starts to call.
When flour runs out, I lose my mind indeed—
As long as there is flour, I have no need.

== Notable poets ==
- Al-Ahnaf al-ʿAkbarī
- Abū Dulaf al-Khazarajī
- Abū Firʿawn al-Sāsānī
- Aḥmad al-Hītī
- Abū al-'Aynā'
- Ibn al-Hajjaj
- Ibn Sukkara
- Al-Aqta' al-Kūfī
- Abu al-Mukhafaf
