= Matt Green (comedian) =

English actor and comedian

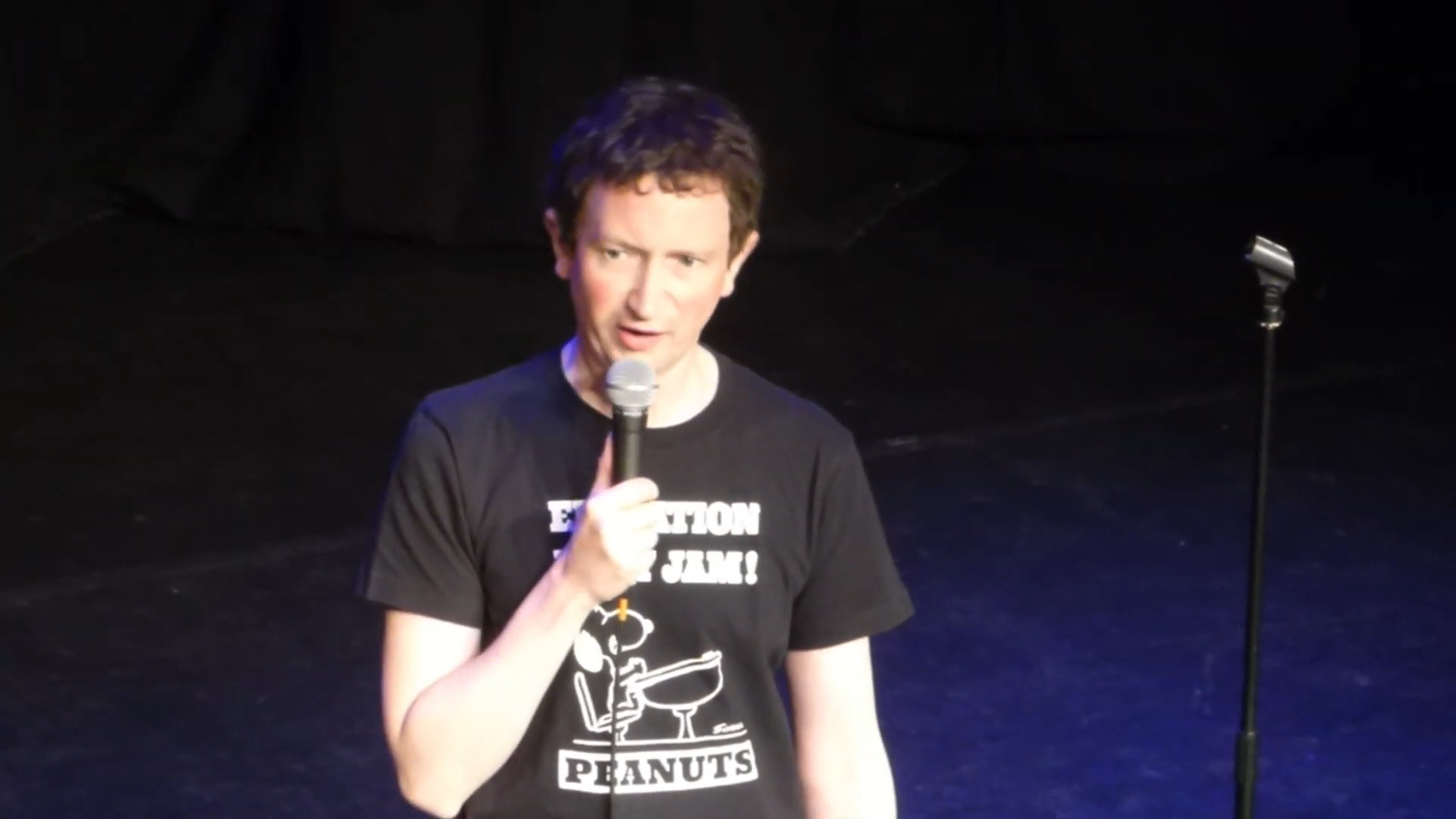
- Born: Matthew James Green; 1978 or 1979 (age 47–48)
- Education: University of Cambridge (BA)

Comedy career
- Years active: 2003-present
- Medium: Stand up, television, radio
- Website: www.mattgreencomedy.com

Matthew James Green (born 1978 or 1979) is an English actor and comedian.

== Early life and education ==
Green was educated at the University of Cambridge where he was a undergraduate at Christ's College, Cambridge and studied English, graduating in 2000. He was a member of the Footlights alongside Richard Ayoade, John Oliver and John Finnemore, and served as president during his final year, with Finnemore as vice president. After graduating, he remained to direct the year-end tour, and did some screenwriting on the side, before embarking on a comedy career.

== Career ==
Green started performing stand up comedy in 2003. He was placed second at the Hackney Empire New Act of the Year in 2005, and later that year went on to perform in The Comedy Zone at the 2005 Edinburgh Festival Fringe alongside Isy Suttie, Russell Kane and Mark Olver.

He has performed six solo stand up shows at the Edinburgh Fringe:

- 2016: Matt Green: Writing to Harvey Keitel at the Pravda Room, Espionage on the Edinburgh Free Fringe
- 2013: Matt Green: Alive at Jack Dome at The Pleasance
- 2011: Matt Green: Too Much Information at the Pleasance| Upstairs
- 2010: Matt Green: Bleeding Funny at the Pleasance Baby Grand
- 2009: Matt Green: Truth & Pleasure at the Pleasance Hut
- 2008: Matt Green: Grow Up Green at the Pleasance 10Dome

Green performed stand up comedy as part of Arthur Smith and Friends at the Glastonbury Festival in 2008, a performance which was recorded and broadcast on BBC Radio 4 as part of the programme Arabella Churchill: The First Lady of Glastonbury.

=== Radio ===
His credits include Constable Twitten in the BBC Radio 4 comedy series Inspector Steine and as Apsley Cherry-Garrard in the BBC Radio 4 classic serial The Worst Journey in the World.

Matt has also appeared in other BBC Radio 4 programmes: Cabin Pressure, Ed Reardon's Week, The Afternoon Play: Man of Steel, The Time Being: Autarky, and High Table, Lower Orders.

=== Television and film ===
In 2011, Green starred in the one off BBC Christmas show Lapland. He has also appeared in Fresh Meat, Cradle To Grave, Casualty, Comedy Showcase (episode: "Other People"), Extras, EastEnders, Comedy Lab (episode: "Speeding"), Footballers' Wives, Garth Marenghi's Darkplace, Two Pints of Lager and a Packet of Crisps and Late Night Mash. He played a BBC Newsreader in the Doctor Who episode "The Star Beast" and a tour guide in the Patience episode "The Timetable".

Green has appeared in the films Finding Neverland and Ali G Indahouse.

=== Writing ===
Green is the co-creator and co-writer (alongside Robin French and Kieron Quirke) of the pilot for the ABC Family sitcom Roommates. He was also a writer on The Now Show on BBC Radio 4 in March 2012, and The News Quiz on BBC Radio 4 in March 2014.

== Personal life ==
As of 2017 Green lived in West Hampstead in London.
