= List of humorists =

A humorist (American English) or humourist (British English) is an intellectual who uses humor in writing or public speaking. Humorists are distinct from comedians, who are show business entertainers whose business is to make an audience laugh, though it is possible for some persons to occupy both roles in the course of their careers.

== List ==
Notable humorists include:

- Kimberley Rees
- Alexander Posey
- André Franquin (1924–1997) French comic book author of Spirou & Fantasio and creator of the Marsupilami.
- Anita Loos
- Anne Roumanoff
- Aziz Nesin
- Benjamin Franklin (1706–1790), as a newspaper editor and printer, became one of America's first humorists, most famously for Poor Richard's Almanack published under the pen name "Richard Saunders".
- Bennett Cerf (1898–1971) one of the founders of the publishing firm Random House, known for his own compilations of jokes and puns, for regular personal appearances lecturing across the United States, and for his television appearances on the panel game show What's My Line?
- Carlos Loiseau
- Carolyn Wells
- Carrie Carlton (1834–1868)
- Dorothy Parker (1893–1967) writer for Vanity Fair, Vogue and other magazines, playwright, and a close friend of Benchley, was known for her biting, satirical wit.
- Eric Omondi
- Erma Bombeck (1927–1996) newspaper columnist and writer of 15 books who specialized in humorously describing midwestern suburban home life.
- Fanny Fern
- Florence Foresti
- Florence King
- Fran Lebowitz (born 1950) writes sardonic social commentary from a New York City point of view.
- Frances Miriam Whitcher
- Gary Owens (1934–2015) was a long-time afternoon radio show host in Los Angeles.
- George Ade (1866–1944) American writer and newspaper columnist.
- George S. Kaufmann (1889–1961) was a playwright, theatre director and producer, and drama critic. He wrote two Broadway musicals for the Marx Brothers: The Cocoanuts and Animal Crackers.
- Gina Barreca
- Grace King
- H. L. Mencken (1880–1956) journalist, satirist, cultural critic and scholar of American English. Known as the "Sage of Baltimore", he is regarded as one of the most influential American writers and prose stylists of the first half of the 20th century. He commented widely on the social scene, literature, music, prominent politicians and contemporary movements. He is known for dubbing the Scopes trial "the Monkey Trial".
- Helen Rowland
- Ibn Sukkara
- Jamel Debbouze
- James Gillray (1756–1815) father of British political cartoon known for his wit.
- James Thurber (1894–1961) cartoonist, author, journalist, playwright, and celebrated wit, best known for his cartoons and short stories published mainly in The New Yorker.
- Jane Goude
- Jean Paul
- Jean Shepherd (1921–1999) was a radio and literature humorist best known for writing the book In God We Trust: All Others Pay Cash which was later adapted to the 1983 movie A Christmas Story.
- Jippensha Ikku (1765–1861) was a prolific Japanese writer and humorist who helped establish the Kokkeibon genre.
- John Henry Faulk
- John Neal (1793–1876) American critic, activist, lecturer, and writer who played a pivotal role in the development of satirical and humorous short stories between the 1820s and 1840s.
- Chief John Smith
- Jyotindra Dave
- Lao She
- Margaret Cameron(1867–1947), novelist, short story writer, playwright, and author of non-fiction works related to mysticism.
- Marietta Holley
- Mario Benedetti
- Mark Twain (pen name of Samuel Langhorn Clemens, 1835–1910) was widely considered the "greatest humorist" the U.S. ever produced, as noted in his New York Times obituary. It's a distinction that garnered wide agreement, as William Faulkner called him "the father of American literature".
- Mary Eleanor Wilkins Freeman
- Mencius
- Michèle Laroque
- Moin Akhter (1950–2011) Pakistani TV and radio comedian.
- Molly Ivins
- Muriel Robin
- Niní Marshall
- Noël Coward (1899–1973) was a playwright, composer, director, actor and singer.
- Omar Sy
- Oscar Wilde (1854–1900) Irish poet and playwright known for his biting wit.
- Nora Ephron
- P. G. Wodehouse (1881–1975) one of the most widely read humorists of the 20th century.
- Peg Bracken
- Phyllis McGinley
- Robert Benchley (1889–1945) best known for his work as a newspaper columnist and film actor, began writing humorously for The Harvard Lampoon while attending Harvard University, and for many years wrote essays and articles for Vanity Fair and The New Yorker.
- Roberto Fontanarrosa
- Ruth McEnery Stuart
- Ruth McKenney
- Sarah Vowell
- Seba Smith (1792–1868) American writer and editor, most famous for his editorial character, Jack Downing.
- Sholom Aleichem(1859–1916) pen name of the leading Yiddish author and playwright Solomon Naumovich Rabinovich, on whose stories the musical Fiddler on the Roof was based.
- Simo Puupponen
- Tabitha Gilman Tenney
- Terry Pratchett (1948–2015) author known for comic fantasy novels, most notably the Discworld series of 41 novels. He was strongly influenced by Wodehouse, Sharpe, Jerome, Coren, and Twain.
- Veronica Geng
- Wahome Mutahi
- Alan Coren (1938–2007) writer, satirist, editor and regular panelist on the BBC radio quiz The News Quiz
- Art Buchwald (1925–2007) wrote a political satire op-ed column for The Washington Post, which was nationally syndicated in many newspapers.
- Douglas Adams (1952–2001) English author.
- Garrison Keilor (born 1942) author, storyteller, voice actor, and radio personality, best known as the creator and host of the Minnesota Public Radio (MPR) show A Prairie Home Companion from 1974 to 2016. He created the fictional Minnesota town Lake Wobegon, the setting of many of his books. He created and voiced the hardboiled detective parody character Guy Noir on his radio show.
- Jerome K. Jerome (1859–1927) English writer and humorist, best known for the comic travelogue Three Men in a Boat.
- Kajetan Abgarowicz (1856–1909) Armenian-Polish journalist, novelist and short story writer.
- René Goscinny (1926–1977) was one of the most important french comic book authors of the Bande dessinée best known for Asterix and Lucky Luke.
- Ring Lardner (1885–1933) was a sports columnist and short story writer best known for his satirical writings about sports, marriage, and the theatre.
- Tom Sharpe (1928–2013) satirical novelist, best known for his Wilt series, as well as Porterhouse Blue and Blott on the Landscape.
- Woody Allen (born 1935) American comedian, writer for The New Yorker.
- Scott Adams (1957–2026) American cartoonist and author.
- Henry Alford (born 1962) American journalist and writer.
- Steve Martin comedian turned playwright.
- Neil Simon humorous playwright.
- Kev Adams
- Michael Attree
- Bugs Baer
- Russell Baker
- Linwood Barclay
- Dave Barry
- Guy Bedos
- Nicolas Bedos
- Stefano Benni
- Ambrose Bierce
- Jean-Marie Bigard
- Josh Billings
- Lewis Black
- Roy Blount, Jr.
- Tom Bodett
- Victor Borge
- Andy Borowitz
- Dylan Brody
- Craig Brown
- Christopher Buckley
- Bo Burnham
- W. Bruce Cameron
- Al Capp
- Lewis Carroll
- Guy Wetmore Carryl
- G. K. Chesterton
- Al Clouston
- Coluche
- William Combe
- Will Cuppy
- Ivor Cutler
- Hugleikur Dagsson
- Bertha Damon
- Dick DeBartolo
- Raymond Devos
- Daniel Dickey
- Drew
- Franck Dubosc
- Gad Elmaleh
- Evan Esar
- John O'Farrell
- Max Ferguson
- Will Ferguson
- Scott Fivelson
- Michael Flanders
- Michael Frayn
- Ian Frazier
- Lewis Burke Frumkes
- James Finn Garner
- Michael Gerber
- Strickland Gillilan
- Jonathan Goldstein
- Lewis Grizzard
- Robert Grossman
- Dick Wick Hall
- Jack Handey
- Chelsea Handler
- Steve Hely
- A.P. Herbert
- Don Herold
- Carl Hiaasen
- Nasrettin Hoca
- John Hodgman
- Andy Offutt Irwin
- Donald Jack
- Douglas William Jerrold
- Frigyes Karinthy, Hungarian author of the early 20th century, mostly known as a humorist
- Walt Kelly
- Doug Kenney
- Ephraim Kishon
- Marvin Kitman
- Ronald Knox
- Harvey Kurtzman
- Jonathan Lambert
- Christian Lander
- Gary Lautens
- Stephen Leacock
- Virginie Lemoine
- Martin Lewis
- Lennie Lower
- Paul B. Lowney
- Merrill Markoe
- Don Marquis
- Demetri Martin
- Bruce McCall
- Stuart McLean
- Patrick F. McManus
- Molière
- Nurul Momen
- Lorna Jean Moorhead
- J. B. Morton
- Ebrahim Nabavi
- Petroleum V. Nasby
- Ogden Nash
- Richard J. Needham
- Eric Nicol
- Chris Onstad
- Flann O'Brien
- S. J. Perelman
- Charles Phoenix
- Roger Price
- Bolesław Prus
- Joe Queenan
- David Rakoff
- Paul Rhymer
- Bill Richardson
- Ryan Max Riley
- Steve Rizzo
- Will Rogers
- Andy Rooney
- P. J. O'Rourke
- Paul Rudnick
- Peter Sagal
- Tim Sample
- George Saunders
- David Sedaris
- Élie Semoun
- Herb Shriner
- Wil Shriner
- Mark Shulman
- Max Shulman
- H. Allen Smith
- Jill Sobule
- Ed Subitzky
- Julia Sweeney
- Jonathan Swift
- Herbert Tarr
- Jeremy Taylor
- William Tenn
- Larry Thompson
- Thomas Bangs Thorpe
- John Kennedy Toole
- Calvin Trillin
- Aisha Tyler
- Brian Unger
- Peter Ustinov
- Kurt Vonnegut
- Artemus Ward
- Sam Watkins
- Bill Watterson
- Ellis Weiner
- E. B. White
- Marshall P. Wilder
- Justin Wilson
- Robert Wringham
