= Heaven Help Us (disambiguation) =

Heaven Help Us is a 1985 comedy-drama film.

Heaven Help Us may also refer to:

- Heaven Help Us! (novel), a 1969 novel by Herbert Tarr
- "Heaven Help Us (TV series)", a 1994 TV series starring John Schneider

== Music ==
- "Heaven Help Us", a song by Stevie Wonder R. Miller 1970
- "Heaven Help Us", a song by Beverly Bremers, Carole Bayer Sager, Melissa Manchester 1972
- "Heaven Help Us", a song by Cirith Ungol from Paradise Lost (Cirith Ungol album)
- "Heaven Help Us", a song by My Chemical Romance, a B-side of the single "Welcome to the Black Parade"
