= Scott Fivelson =

Scott Fivelson is an American writer, playwright, and director, who was the writer and producer of American Reel, starring David Carradine, and Near Myth: The Oskar Knight Story.

== Early career ==
Fivelson was born in Chicago, Illinois and attended Northwestern University. He has written short stories and satirical pieces for Chicago Magazine, the Chicago Tribune, Los Angeles magazine, the Los Angeles Times, the L.A. Weekly, Tales from the Heart of Hollywood, and other publications. He is the author of the one-act plays, Dial L for Latch-Key and Leading the Witness, published by Hen House Press. He is also the author of the 2013 novel Tuxes, which was published by BeachSide Press, and which was also released in a French e-edition from Polymancer Studios, Inc.

== Writing ==
Fivelson is the writer and director of Near Myth: The Oskar Knight Story, a Hollywood biopic starring Lenny Von Dohlen as director "Oskar Knight". His short story in paperback and ebook form, Johnny Passe, also appears in the anthology, Fiction Noir, both published by Hen House Press.

As a screenwriter, Fivelson's film credits include American Reel, starring David Carradine, Michael Maloney, and Mariel Hemingway; and 3 Holes and a Smoking Gun, starring James Wilder, Joaquim de Almeida, Rudolf Martin, and Richard Edson. Near Myth: The Oskar Knight Story features an ensemble cast including Margaret O'Brien, Joaquim de Almeida, Julianna Guill, Kristina Anapau, and many other stars who share their memories and feelings about the legendary director.

His one-act plays, Dial L for Latch-Key and Leading the Witness, have been performed at the Upstairs at The Gatehouse theatre in Highgate Village, London, England, starring James Torme, and at The Phoenix Theatre in San Francisco, presented by Off Broadway West.

Dial L for Latch-Key: The Radio Play has been released as an audiobook by Blackstone Audio. This radio play version, which he directed, has been broadcast on Resonance FM radio in London.

Fivelson's short story, "A Farewell to Legs" —Hemingway-esque prose about a jogger in a marathon across Africa — has also been published as an audiobook by Blackstone Audio. The audiobook is read by actress Mariel Hemingway, the granddaughter of Ernest Hemingway.

Fivelson has done work as a songwriter. His songs include “Secret Entrance to Your Heart” by Breeze BossaNova, “What the Piano Knows” by Dave Corwin and Catherine Ashcroft, and the jazz album Awesome in New York, featuring Mishka Spiro and Zane Musa.
