= John Ramm =

English comedian and actor

John Ramm is an English comedian and actor. He plays Raymond Box in the National Theatre of Brent, and has also appeared on film and television in Robin Hood ("Will You Tolerate This?"), The Palace, Foyle's War ("All Clear") and as Makepeace's neighbour in Shakespeare in Love.

On stage, he has appeared with the Royal Shakespeare Company in their 2004 Lope de Vega season, at the Chicken Festival Theatre, in a 2008 production of Ring Round the Moon at the Playhouse Theatre London, as Dogberry in Much Ado About Nothing in 2011, in the 2013 play The Low Road, and as Thomas More and Henry Norris in Mike Poulton's 2014-2015 stage adaptions of Wolf Hall and Bring Up The Bodies respectively. He performed at the Orange Tree Theatre in Sheppey, and received the 2016 Offie for "Best Male Performance".

Ramm plays Sergeant Brunswick in the BBC Radio 4 comedy drama series Inspector Steine. In March 2022, he appeared in an episode of the BBC soap opera Doctors as Bix Banton.

== Filmography ==
=== Film ===
Year	Title	Role	Notes
1997	Food of Love	Donald	
1998	Shakespeare in Love	Makepeace's Neighbour	
2000	The Nine Lives of Tomas Katz	Ivul Gurk	
2006	Losing It	Dave	Television film
2013	The Love Punch	Ken	
2017	6 Days	Tony Crabb	
2017	On Chesil Beach	Postman Terry	
2017	Sunset Dreams	Clem Bread	
2018	Mary Queen of Scots	Bull	
2021	The Dinner After	David	Short film
2022	Bus Driver	Steve	Short film
2023	Meet You in Scotland	Mr. Miller	Television film

=== Television ===
Year	Title	Role	Notes
1987	ScreenPlay	Reporter	Episode: "The Interrogation of John"
1988	South of the Border	Brent Lowe	Episode: "Series 1, Episode 4"
1991	Ten Short Tales from Electric House	Andelou	Miniseries
1991	The Bill	Ambrose	Episode: "Double or Quits"
1993	The Bill	Paul Lee	Episode: "Tangled Webs"
1997	The Bill	George Hibbard	Episode: "Copier"
1999	People Like Us		Episode: "The Police Officer"
2000	The Queen's Nose	Mr. Nash	Episode: "Series 4, Episode 5"
2006	Robin Hood	Jeffrey	Episode: "Will You Tolerate This?"
2008	Doctors	Adrian Hills	Episode: "Just Deserts"
2008	The Palace	Peter Bayfield	Series regular; 8 episodes
2008	Foyle's War	Dr. Henry Ziegler	Episode: "All Clear"
2009	Kröd Mändoon and the Flaming Sword of Fire	Annoying Villager	Recurring role; 2 episodes
2009	My Family	Adam	Episode: "A Difficult Undertaking"
2009	Midsomer Murders	Vince	Episode: "The Great and the Good"
2011	Come Fly with Me	Business-Class Passenger	Episode: "Episode 4"
2011	Twenty Twelve	Nigel Fox	Episode: "Equestrian Controversy"
2011–2017	Fright Night Theater	Various	Recurring role; 15 episodes
2013	It's Kevin	Various	Episode: "Episode 6"
2013	Count Arthur Strong	Max Baker	Episode: "Memory Man"
2015	Humans	Malcolm	Episode: "Episode 4"
2017	Quacks	Mr. Burton	Episode: "The Madman's Trial"
2020	Housebound	Head Teacher	Recurring role; 2 episodes
2022	Doctors	Bix Banton	Episode: "Winning Is Everything"
2022	Atlanta	Guard	Episode: "Cancer Attack"
2022	Casualty	Martin Croft	Episode: "Never Alone"
2022	Am I Being Unreasonable?	Phil	Episode: "Episode 4"
2022	Whitstable Pearl	Des	Episode: "Hidden Treasures"
