= Mark Archer =

American film director

Mark Archer is an American film and television producer, director and writer. He was born in Fort Wayne, Indiana.

== Career ==
His credits include the 1997 Sundance Film Festival winner, In the Company of Men, for which he was nominated for "Best First Feature" at the 1997 Independent Spirit Awards. In the Company of Men also won the Filmmaker's Trophy at the 1997 Sundance Film Festival. The film was shot in eleven days at a cost of $20,000. Archer's other feature film credits include American Reel, starring David Carradine, Michael Maloney and Mariel Hemingway.

Since then, Archer moved into other fields, such as cinematography, and founded his own production company, New Hollywood Studios, which handles commercials and post-production.

== Filmography ==
- In the Company of Men (1997)
- New Hope (2002)
- Night Shift (TV Movie) (2003)
- American Reel (2003)
- The Life Between (2003)
