= The Conversion of Chaplain Cohen =

1963 novel by Herbert Tarr

- First edition
- Author: Herbert Tarr
- Language: English
- Publisher: Bernard Geis Associates
- Publication date: April 18, 1963
- Publication place: United States
- Media type: Print (hardback & paperback)
- Followed by: Heaven Help Us!

The Conversion of Chaplain Cohen is a 1963 novel by the American writer and rabbi Herbert Tarr about a young rabbi serving as a United States Air Force military chaplain.

== Background ==
The Conversion of Chaplain Cohen was Tarr's first novel, inspired by his experience as a rabbi and military chaplain. Following his ordination as a Reform rabbi in 1955, Tarr served as an Air Force chaplain, a pulpit rabbi in a synagogue in Buffalo, New York, and (beginning in 1960) a rabbi in a synagogue in Westbury, New York. In 1963 he decided to leave the pulpit to pursue a career as a novelist full-time, believing that he could be more effective in terms of reaching others that way, stating that "religion is basically out of touch with people".

== Title ==
The title is based on Cohen's "conversion" from his more narrow and parochial Jewish vision of faith (what reviewer Brendan Behan calls a "Brooklynese" vision) to the more universal vision of a chaplain dedicated to helping men and women of all religions. Behan describes this conversion as part of a "maturing" process for Cohen, both as a human being and as a rabbi: "His compassion and vital interest expand from the group forming his own religion...to all religions and people from all places."

== Synopsis ==
The newly ordained rabbi David Cohen, a Brooklyn, New York native, joins the United States Air Force as a chaplain. He goes through the common induction process for the military; attends Air Force Chaplaincy School with other rabbis, priests, and ministers; and serves at his first duty station. The novel follows Cohen "ministering the good word to soldiers of all faiths, and getting himself into all sorts of wonderful, unclerical-type scrapes."

The reviewer Brendan Behan described Cohen as "a man of ideals, having the idiotic notion that he should speak out against injustice wherever he sees it." Describing an early scene in the book when Cohen comes to the defense of a Puerto Rican man who is suffering at the hands of a prejudiced officer at the Army's induction center, Behan notes that "this episode sets the tone for the whole book, the battle of David Cohen with the forces of darkness, both in and out of the Air Force". Behan adds that Cohen's faith and values set him apart from some of the other clergy in the novel, because he is "not so interested in securing the human soul as he is with human happiness".

== Critical reception ==
The novel received favorable reviews, with the New York Herald Tribune describing it as "amusing, powerful and deeply felt...the initiation of an ingenuous Brooklyn rabbi named David Cohen into the paradoxes, absurdities, horrors, and heroisms of military life." The Chicago American called it "richly rewarding...the best bet to come along in years."

A Kirkus review notes that Tarr

"can retell a dog-eared incident, such as a soldier's first home leave, as if it had never been told before. It is all very real – and so is Rabbi Cohen, as much a lonely, troubled young hothead as the licensed middleman in other people's troubles".

In Behan's review of the book for The New York Times, he notes that Tarr's background as a rabbi enabled him to add serious messages to what was a "funny book": "Maybe that's why Tarr is a good writer, because, while he has us busy laughing, he's throwing sermons at us behind our backs."
