= In the Company of Men =

- Theatrical release poster
- Directed by: Neil LaBute
- Written by: Neil LaBute
- Based on: In the Company of Men by Neil LaBute
- Produced by: Mark Archer; Stephen Pevner
- Starring: Aaron Eckhart; Stacy Edwards; Matt Malloy
- Cinematography: Tony Hettinger
- Edited by: Joel Plotch
- Music by: Karel Roessingh; Ken Williams
- Production companies: Atlantis Entertainment; Company One Productions
- Distributed by: Sony Pictures Classics (United States and Canada); Alliance Independent Films (International)
- Release dates: January 19, 1997 (Sundance); August 1, 1997 (U.S.)
- Running time: 97 minutes
- Country: United States
- Languages: English; American Sign Language
- Budget: $250,000
- Box office: $2.8 million

In the Company of Men is a 1997 American black comedy film, written and directed by Neil LaBute and starring Aaron Eckhart, Matt Malloy, and Stacy Edwards. The film, which was adapted from a play written by LaBute and served as his feature film debut, won him the Independent Spirit Award for Best First Screenplay.

The film revolves around two male co-workers, Chad and Howard, who, angry and frustrated with women in general, plot to toy maliciously with the emotions of a deaf female subordinate. It was first written as a play, which debuted at Brigham Young University in December 1992, and received a 1993 Drama AML Award from the Association for Mormon Letters.

== Plot ==
Chad and Howard are two middle management employees at a corporation, temporarily assigned to a branch office away from home for six weeks. Embittered by bad experiences with women, Chad and Howard form a mean-spirited revenge scheme to find an insecure woman, romance her simultaneously, and then break up with her at the same time. Chad is the originator and driving force behind the scheme, while Howard is the more passive of the two, which leads to a later conflict with the scheme.

Chad decides upon Christine, a deaf co-worker who is so self-conscious that she wears headphones so people, thinking that she is listening to music, are compelled to get her attention visually without immediately learning that she is deaf. Chad and Howard decide to each ask her out, and over the course of several weeks, date her simultaneously.

In the meantime, things with the project go wrong; a fax Chad is supposed to have made to the home office is "lost" and a presentation Chad is supposed to deliver to the home office cannot be carried out successfully after some documents are allegedly printed so lightly that they are illegible. These mishaps culminate in Howard being demoted and Chad taking his place as the head of the project after Chad places the blame for the mishaps unfairly on Howard. Chad eventually sleeps with Christine, and she falls in love with him. When Christine eventually breaks this news to Howard, Howard tells Christine the truth about their scheme, and tells her that he loves her. Christine is shocked by the revelation, and refuses to believe that Chad would do this. When she confronts Chad, he admits the truth. Christine angrily slaps Chad, but Chad is unashamed of his behavior, and cruelly taunts Christine, who collapses into tears after he leaves her.

Weeks later, Howard confronts Chad back home at his apartment. Howard is now apparently in the bad graces of the company, having been moved to a lower floor, while Chad is doing well, and thus offering to say something on Howard's behalf. Nevertheless, Howard is not worried about work; he confesses to Chad that he really loved Christine. At this point, Chad, despite having previously told Howard that his girlfriend, Suzanne, had left him, shows Howard that she is still there, asleep in his bed. Chad says that he carried out the plan "because I could," and cruelly asks Howard how it feels to have truly hurt someone. Howard, who had never done anything like that before, leaves, horrified. He vomits down the stairwell.

Howard later travels back to the city and to a bank where he sees Christine working, and tries to speak to her, but she looks away in anger. He loudly pleads with her to "listen" to him, but his pleas literally fall on deaf ears.

== Cast ==
- Aaron Eckhart as Chad
- Matt Malloy as Howard
- Stacy Edwards as Christine
- Mark Rector as John
- Jason Dixie as Intern

== Release ==
In the Company of Men was screened in the Dramatic competition at the 1997 Sundance Film Festival and in the Un Certain Regard section at the 1997 Cannes Film Festival. Shortly after its premiere at Sundance, Alliance Independent Films acquired worldwide distribution rights outside North America to the film. On March 28, 1997, Sony Pictures Classics acquired North American distribution rights to the film, beating out studios such as Fox Searchlight Pictures and Orion Pictures.

=== Box office ===
In the Company of Men opened in a limited release in eight theaters in the United States on August 1, 1997, and grossed $100,006, with an average of $12,500 per theater. The film's widest release was 108 theaters, earning $2,804,473.

=== Critical reception ===
The film received very positive reviews from critics and has a score of 89% on Rotten Tomatoes based on 56 reviews with an average rating of 7.90/10. The critical consensus states: "Neil LaBute's pitch-black comedy is a masterful exploration of male insecurity, and it's elevated by a breakout performance by Aaron Eckhart as a businessman who likes to play psychological games". The film also has a score of 81 out of 100 on Metacritic based on 25 critics, indicating "universal acclaim". In January 1998, it was included on Siskel and Ebert's "Best Films of 1997" episode.

==== Retrospective lists ====
The character of Chad was also nominated by the American Film Institute for their list of AFI's 100 Years...100 Heroes and Villains, but did not make it into the top 100.

In the Company of Men was listed on Empire's 500 Greatest films of all time at number 493.

=== Accolades ===
Award	Date of ceremony	Category	Recipient	Result
Sundance Film Festival	1997	Filmmaker's Trophy	Neil LaBute	Won
Sundance Film Festival	1997	Grand Jury Prize	Neil LaBute	Nominated
Deauville Film Festival	1997	Fun Radio Trophy	Neil LaBute	Won
Deauville Film Festival	1997	Jury Special Prize	Neil LaBute	Won
Deauville Film Festival	1997	Grand Special Prize	Neil LaBute	Nominated
Edinburgh International Film Festival	1997	Channel 4 Director's Award – Special Mention	Neil LaBute	Won
Taormina International Film Festival	1997	Best Actor	Aaron Eckhart	Won
Taormina International Film Festival	1997	Best Actress	Stacy Edwards	Won
Thessaloniki International Film Festival	1997	Golden Alexander	Neil LaBute	Nominated
National Board of Review Awards	December 9, 1997	Special Recognition for Excellence in Filmmaking		Won
Independent Spirit Awards	March 21, 1998	Best First Feature	Neil LaBute, Mark Archer, Stephen Pevner	Nominated
Independent Spirit Awards	March 21, 1998	Best Female Lead	Stacy Edwards	Nominated
Independent Spirit Awards	March 21, 1998	Best Debut Performance	Aaron Eckhart	Won
Independent Spirit Awards	March 21, 1998	Best First Screenplay	Neil LaBute	Won
New York Film Critics Circle Awards	January 4, 1998	Best First Film	Neil LaBute	Won
Satellite Awards	February 2, 1998	Special Achievement Award for Outstanding New Talent	Aaron Eckhart	Won
Chicago Film Critics Association Awards	March 1, 1998	Most Promising Actor	Aaron Eckhart	Nominated
Chicago Film Critics Association Awards	March 1, 1998	Most Promising Actress	Stacy Edwards	Nominated

== Home media ==
The DVD of the film contains two commentary tracks, one with director Neil LaBute, and the other with stars Aaron Eckhart, Matt Malloy and Stacy Edwards.

== See also ==
- List of films featuring the deaf and hard of hearing
