= Struck Off and Die =

British comedy duo

Struck Off and Die were a British comedy duo active during the 1990s which consisted of doctors Tony Gardner and Phil Hammond. Their material drew heavily on their knowledge and experience of healthcare, and took a particularly cynical view of the problems that beset the UK's National Health Service.

The two men met while junior doctors at Frenchay Hospital, in Bristol, England, during the late 1980s. Later, they had their own radio series on BBC Radio 4.

Series one covered various areas of the health service. It included sketches and vox pop segments.

1. Surgeons - 13 August 1993
2. GPs - 20 August 1993
3. Nurses - 27 August 1993
4. Birth and Death - 3 September 1993

Episodes 1 and 2 were released on a compilation CD by the BBC.

Series two took as its theme Shakespeare's seven ages of man from As You Like It.

1. The Infant and the Whining Schoolboy - 17 August 1994
2. The Lover, Sighing Like a Furnace - 26 August 1994
3. From Marriage to Menopause - 2 September 1994
4. The Lean and Slippered Pantaloon - 9 September 1994

A third series followed in 2000, entitled the Struck Off and Die Family Health Companion. It was broadcast from 29 March 2000 to 6 May 2000.

Both of them have since led divergent careers, with Tony Gardner concentrating on acting, and Phil Hammond in writing, presenting, teaching medical students and general practice.
