= Tony Gardner =

English actor (born 1964)

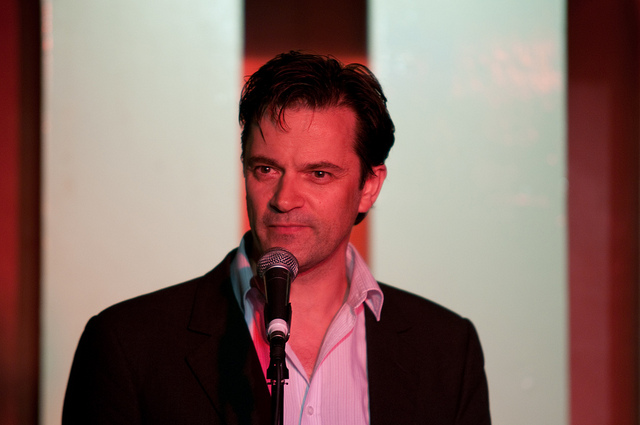
- Gardner onstage at 100 Club, 2010
- Born: Tony Gardner; 10 January 1964 (age 62); Ashton-under-Lyne, Lancashire, England
- Occupations: Actor; doctor; comedian
- Television: My Parents are Aliens
- Children: 2

Tony Gardner (born 10 January 1964) is an English actor, comedian and doctor.

== Early life and education ==
He attended St Augustine's Catholic College in Trowbridge, Wiltshire.

== Career ==
Gardner qualified as a physician at Guy's Hospital in 1987, then as a general practitioner in 1993. He combined medicine and comedy during the 1990s as half of the award-winning comedy duo Struck Off and Die with Phil Hammond.

=== Acting career ===
Gardner eventually left medicine to become an actor, starring in a number of TV commercials, including that for the Renault Mégane. He reached prominence playing Brian Johnson in CITV's My Parents Are Aliens (episodes of which he also wrote) and Michael, the café owner in Jack Dee's BBC sitcom Lead Balloon. In 2009–10 he starred in three plays directed by Sir Peter Hall. In 2011 he played Professor Tony Shales in the Channel 4 series Fresh Meat.

Between 2012 and 2020, he played John in five series of the critically acclaimed romantic drama series Last Tango in Halifax. The programme attracted impressive ratings for BBC One, with the third series posting an average of 7.8 million viewers.

Between 2013 and 2015, he appeared as Lieutenant Colonel Phillip Smith in three series of the wartime comedy Bluestone 42, about a British bomb disposal detachment in Afghanistan during Operation Herrick. He appeared as Dan Miller MP in the BBC political comedy The Thick of It. He was a main character of the music video "Giant Peach" by Wolf Alice. He appeared in a variety of roles in Tracey Ullman's Show from 2016. He also appeared in an episode of the Netflix show, Lovesick, portraying Dylan’s father at surprise wedding anniversary party.

In January 2021, Gardner appeared in S11E1 of Not Going Out as a neighbour to Lee and Lucy. He then appeared again in S12E4 in 2022.

== Filmography ==
Filmography
Year	Title	Role	Notes
1994	Joking Apart		
1995	Now What?		Writer
1995	You Bet!	Sherlock Holmes	Series 8, Episode 6
1997	Sunnyside Farm	Justin	
1997	Grown Ups		
1997	Armstrong and Miller		Writer
1999–2006	My Parents Are Aliens	Brian Johnson	Writer and Cast Member
2000–2006	Absolute Power		
2001	So What Now?	Dan	Episode: Swinger
2001	Lenny Henry in Pieces		
2001	The Armando Iannucci Shows		
2004	The Lenny Henry Show		
2005–2012	The Thick of It	Dan Miller	
2006	Bremner, Bird and Fortune		
2006–2011	Lead Balloon	Michael	Series regular
2007	Jekyll	David	Series 1, Episode 4
2007	Dumped	Narrator	Voice
2007	His Master's Voice		
2008	Love Soup	Matthew	Episode: Ragged Claws
2009	May Contain Nuts	Philip Russell	TV movie
2009	Moving Wallpaper	George	Series 2, Episode 4
2010	M.I. High	Prime Minister	episode: Vote Skul
2011–2016	Fresh Meat	Professor Tony Shales	13 episodes
2012–2020	Last Tango in Halifax	John Elliot	Series regular
2012	Cockneys vs Zombies	Clive	
2012	New Tricks	Lucas Graves	episode: Old School Ties
2012	Gates	Aiden	
2013	The Escape Artist	Trevor Harris	TV-Mini Series
2013	Big Bad World	Dr. Tim	Series 1, Episode 6
2013–2015	Bluestone 42	Lieutenant Colonel Smith	
2014	Plebs	Philo	Series 2, Episode 6
2014	Law & Order: UK	Douglas Stone	Episode: Repeat to Fade
2016	Young Hyacinth	Claude	TV
2016	Stella	Ivan Schloss	
2016–2017	Tracey Ullman's Show	Various	
2017–2018	Tracey Breaks the News	Various	
2017	Doctor Who	Douglas	"The Pyramid at the End of the World" (Series 10, Episode 7)
2017	Death in Paradise	Ian Matlock	1 episode
2017	Unforgotten	James Moray	3 episodes
2017	Back	Nick Molloy	Series 1, Episode 1
2018	Death on the Tyne	Justin	
2018	Lovesick	Julian	
2018	Innocent	Detective Superintendent Hillman	ITV mini-series in four parts
2019	Midsomer Murders	Russell Grundy	"The Ghost of Causton Abbey" (Series 20, Episode 1)
2019	Horrible Histories: The Movie	Antonius	
2021–2022	Not Going Out	Stuart	Lee and Lucy's neighbour
2026	Silent Witness	Ron Hill	"The Disappearance of Alice Hill" (Series 29, Episodes 1 and 2)
