= Herpes Viruses Association =

Support group

The Herpes Viruses Association (formerly the Herpes Association) was started in 1982. It is a support group for people with Herpes simplex virus. It conducts information campaigns and attempts to reduce the stigma associated with sexually transmitted diseases.

It became a registered charity with a Dept of Health grant in 1985. It is now fully independent and relies on subscriptions and donations. The charity started as a string of local group meetings before acquiring an office and a national spread. It is widely referred to as a source of help for patients who are anxious about the conditions, primarily genital herpes.

The Association campaigns against the transmission of herpes being treated as a criminal offence. It supported David Golding who was convicted and imprisoned for infecting a woman with genital herpes in 2011. Their spokesman said the sentence for causing grievous bodily harm was ‘outrageous’ and compared it to prosecuting children for giving their friends chicken pox, or passing on a cold sore.

It supported the campaign to keep the sexual health services of the Countess of Chester Hospital NHS Foundation Trust in 2014.

It carried out a double-blind trial of liquorice lip balm on forty people in 2014 and found that it reduced the severity of symptoms in most subjects. Marian Nicholson, the Director of the Association, is frequently quoted in relation to research into the development of remedies.

Dr Phil Hammond (comedian) is a current patron of the association, along with five respected genitourinary physicians. Between 1993 and 2002 Clare Rayner was one of its patrons.
