= Stephen Pevner =

American film producer

- Born: September 10, 1959 (age 67); Fort Wayne
- Occupations: Film and theater producer, literary agent
- Years active: 1991–present

Stephen Pevner (born September 10, 1959) is an American film and theater producer and literary agent.

A graduate of George Washington University, Pevner began his literary career in 1991, founding Stephen Pevner, Inc. He quickly began representing some of the most culturally relevant writers/filmmakers of his generation including Gregg Araki, Tom DiCillo, Karen Salmansohn, Richard Linklater and Todd Solondz.

In 1995, a then unknown Eve Ensler came to Stephen with a manuscript for what would become known as The Vagina Monologues. Originally created as a book, Pevner helped develop it into a reading. The one-woman play (starring Ensler) opened at Fez Under Time Cafe and then transferred to HERE Arts Center before becoming a global phenomenon.

Pevner's success continued later that year when he met Neil LaBute and produced his writing/directing film debut, In the Company of Men starring Aaron Eckhart. Originally made on a budget of $25,000, it went on to gross over $2.8 million. This film won the Filmmaker's Trophy at the 1996 Sundance Film Festival, Independent Spirit Award and New York Film Critics Award for Best First Feature Film.

Pevner and LaBute then signed a three-picture deal, with LaBute directing Your Friends & Neighbors starring Ben Stiller, Nurse Betty starring Renée Zellweger, and Possession starring Gwyneth Paltrow. Pevner served as executive producer on all three.

Pevner then relocated to New York City in 2003, taking over the reins as impresario behind many large underground dance parties in New York via his company The Saint at Large(c).

In 1999, Pevner introduced theater audiences to LaBute as Lead Producer of Bash: Latter-Day Plays (Off-Broadway, LA London). Starring Calista Flockhart, Paul Rudd, Ron Eldard and directed by Joe Mantello, the play was filmed live as a Showtime Presentation (winner of Jury Award for Best Television Movie at Canadian BANFF Awards) and named in the Top 5 Shows of the Year by Time Magazine.

In 2003, Pevner produced the smash hit Hollywood send-up, Matt & Ben, written by and starring Mindy Kaling and Brenda Withers. With seated productions Off-Broadway, Los Angeles, Chicago and a national tour, the play made Time's Top 10 for 2003.

In 2004, Pevner commissioned an original screenplay from a young Columbia Univ. politico, Beau Willimon, on which the play Farragut North is based. Staged to much acclaim at The Atlantic Theater Company and The Geffen Playhouse with Chris Noth and Chris Pine, the production was included in Time's Top 10 for 2008 and has been adapted as a motion picture: The Ides of March with George Clooney directing and starring alongside Ryan Gosling, Philip Seymour Hoffman, Paul Giamatti. Marissa Tomei and Evan Rachael Wood of which Pevner, along with Leonardo DiCaprio, serves as executive producer. The film was nominated for Best Adapted Screenplay of 2011 at the 84th Academy Awards.

In 2005, Pevner produced the New York City concert debut of Jennifer Hudson at Hammerstein Ballroom. Three years later, he produced the American debut of Euro-pop glamour girl Róisín Murphy.

In 2007, Pevner conceived Schwarzwald – The Movie You Can Dance To, a motion picture incorporating multi-screen projection, live performance and a continuous dance mix. The film installation continues to screen in film and art festivals and nightclubs around the world.

In 2011, Pevner produced Caligula Maximus – featuring Kayvon Zand, a musical disco circus showcasing a host of New York's nightlife talent. Subsequently, Pevner produced Black Rose Tango, a short film about Rose Wood, called the Sally Bowles of New York's underground cabaret scene.

In 2013, Pevner, through his production company The Saint At Large, produced the critically acclaimed Off-Broadway premiere of Nutcracker Rouge, a Baroque, burlesque ballet, at the Minetta Lane Theater which garnered a Drama Desk Nomination for the 2013-2014 Season in the category of Unique Theatrical Experience.
