= Michael Maloney =

English actor

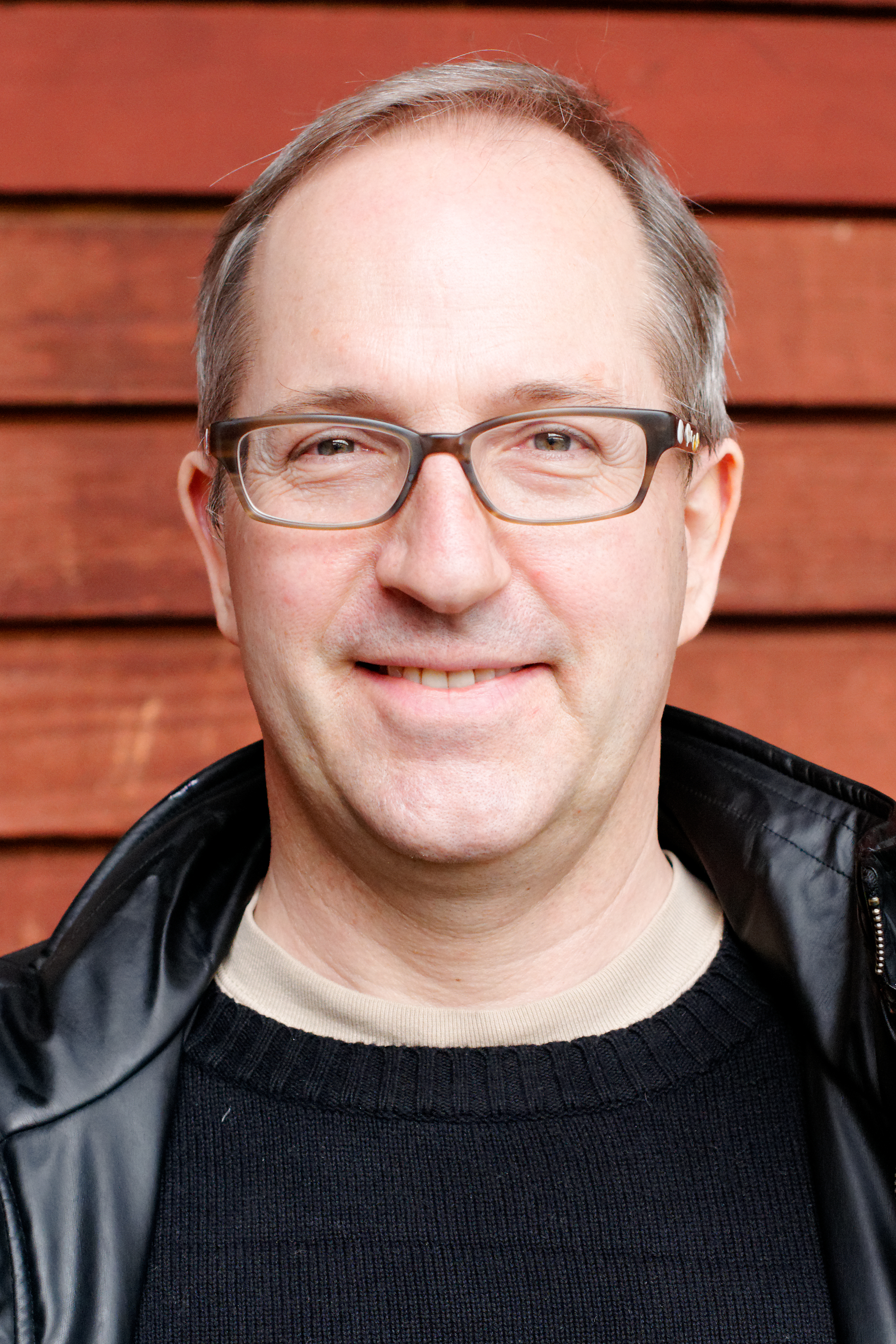
- Maloney at the 2011 Minghella Film Festival
- Born: 19 June 1957 (age 69); Bury St Edmunds, Suffolk, England
- Occupation: Actor
- Years active: 1979–present

Michael Maloney (born 19 June 1957) is a British actor, best known for his many roles in film and television, including several roles in various Shakespeare screen adaptations. He has also appeared as a voice actor on radio, for audio books, and in video games. In 2025, Maloney starred as Hercule Poirot in a touring production of Murder on the Orient Express.

== Early life and education ==
Michael Maloney was born on 19 June 1957 at Bury St Edmunds, Suffolk, England. His father had emigrated from County Cork, Ireland, to Godalming, Surrey.

After finishing school, he attended the London Academy of Music and Dramatic Art.

== Career ==
Maloney's first television appearance was as Peter Barkworth's teenage son in the 1979 drama series Telford's Change.

He made his West End debut in 1979 in Can you Hear Me at The Back?, by Brian Clark, followed immediately by Taking Steps by Alan Ayckbourn. After playing Toby Gashe in The Bell, by Iris Murdoch, Maloney joined the Royal Shakespeare Company in 1982 playing Ferdinand in The Tempest. After the RSC, he went on to play in The Perfectionist at Hampstead, the title role of Peer Gynt for Cambridge Theatre Company, The London Cuckolds at the Lyric Hammersmith, Two Planks and a Passion by Anthony Minghella, directed by Danny Boyle at Greenwich and Built on Sand at the Royal Court. Maloney went on to appear in many films and television series, including What If It's Raining, by Anthony Minghella, for Channel 4. He became a familiar face after playing the Dauphin in Kenneth Branagh's 1989 film adaptation of Henry V. In the early 1990s, he played Prince Hal in Henry IV Parts 1 and 2, Romeo in Romeo and Juliet for the RSC and Hamlet on a national tour starting at Greenwich. He appeared on television in Mr Wakefield's Crusade, on film as Mark in Truly, Madly, Deeply, and in 1994 he took the lead in the BBC adaptation of Love on a Branch Line. He appeared in both the 1990 and 1996 film versions of Hamlet, as Rosencrantz and Laertes respectively, and in several other Shakespeare screen adaptations, including the lead role in In the Bleak Midwinter by Kenneth Branagh. In addition to his TV appearances, he starred as Jason Fields in the film American Reel in 1999. 2002 saw him play Brian Albumen, personal aide to Rik Mayall's Adonis Cnut character in the Gran and Marks penned TV sitcom Believe Nothing. In 2003, he appeared as the Belgian Prosper Profond in The Forsyte Saga. In the theatre he played Hamlet again for Yukio Ninagawa on tour and at the Barbican. He played Cassius in the 2005 miniseries Empire, John Major in 2009's Margaret and Prime Minister Sir Robert Peel in the 2009 film The Young Victoria.

He is active in radio drama on BBC Radio 4, playing the Dean in both series of High Table, Lower Orders and Giles the gossip columnist in His Master's Voice. He has made a guest appearance in the BBC Radio 4 series Baldi. He has also appeared in a Bollywood films Kisna, and I See You, playing the detective inspector.

In 2010, he appeared in long-running drama Casualty as consultant Howard Fairfax, and in series 4 of the political satire series The Thick of It, he played Matthew Hodge, part of the Goolding Inquiry. In 2013, he portrayed Sir Henry Stafford, third husband of Lady Margaret Beaufort, in the BBC TV series The White Queen.

In 2016, he appeared in the ITV/Netflix series Paranoid. He was also in the second series of Utopia for Channel 4 and played Edward Heath in series 3 of The Crown. He most recently has a cameo role in Belfast, directed by Kenneth Branagh, and played the role of Vanya, in Vanya, Sonia, Masha and Spike, by Christopher Durang, directed by Walter Bobbie, at the Charing Cross Theatre.

He has recorded many audio books, including Captain Corelli's Mandolin.

He has also lent his voice to various video game characters, including The Lost Soul in the 2013 video game Castlevania: Lords of Shadow - Mirror of Fate, Avallac'h in the 2015 video game The Witcher 3: Wild Hunt, and Doloran in the 2018 video game Ni no Kuni II: Revenant Kingdom.

In 2025, Maloney starred as Hercule Poirot in a touring production of Murder on the Orient Express. In September 2026, he played the part of Ernest Eccles in a new stage adaptation of Patrick Hamilton's 20,000 Streets Under the Sky, adapted by Simon Reade and directed by Matthew Iliffe, which premiered at London's Southwark Playhouse Borough.

== Personal life ==
In 2002, Maloney married Italian-American model and photographer Kim Andreolli.

He is an advocate for macrobiotic eating.

== Filmography ==
=== Film ===
Year	Title	Role	Notes
1980	Richard's Things	Bill	
1984	Sharma and Beyond	Stephen Archer	Television film
1984	Ordeal by Innocence	Micky Argyle	
1985	Tartuffe, or The Impostor	Damis	Television film
1986	A Dangerous Kind of Love	Whymper	Television film
1987	Scoop	William Boot	Television film
1988	The Mask	Leonardo	
1989	Henry V	Louis the Dauphin	
1989	Relatively Speaking	Gregory Pointer	Television film
1990	Truly, Madly, Deeply	Mark	
1990	Hamlet	Rosencrantz	
1993	Micky Love	Tony Scott	Television film
1993	Screen Play		Short film
1993	The Waiter	Frederico	Short film
1995	In the Bleak Midwinter	Joe Harper (Hamlet)	
1995	Othello	Roderigo	
1995	Trafford Tanzi	Referee	Television film
1996	Hamlet	Laertes	
1997	Hysteria	Dr. Samuel Fry	
1997	Thursday	Nick	Short film
1997	Sex & Chocolate	Billy Gale	Television film
1998	Macbeth	Banquo	Television film
1998	The Changeling	Frank	Short film
1999	American Reel	Jason Fields	
2000	Unleaded	Anton	
2000	A Christmas Carol	Bob Cratchit	Television film
2000	Journey Through the Night	Narrator	Short film
2002	Me & Mrs Jones	Ivan McDermott	Television film
2003	Twelfth Night, or What You Will	Malvolio	Television film
2003	Bed and Breakfast	Peter	
2004	Battle of the Brave	Governor James Murray	
2005	Kisna: The Warrior Poet	Peter Beckett	
2006	Pinochet in Suburbia	Jack Straw	Television film
2006	Babel	James	
2006	Notes on a Scandal	Sandy Pabblem	
2006	I See You	Inspector John Smith	
2007	Sherlock Holmes and the Baker Street Irregulars	Inspector Stirling	Television film
2007	The Soul Rescuer	The Soul Rescuer	Short film
2007	Learners	John	Television film
2007	Saturday's Shadow	Father	Short film
2007	Impact Earth	Adam Bregorsky	Television film
2008	The Applicant	Rejection Letter	Short film
2009	Margaret	John Major	Television film
2009	The Young Victoria	Sir Robert Peel	
2010	Sex & Drugs & Rock & Roll	Graham	
2010	Koda	Ken	Short film
2010	Trouble Brewing	Alan	Short film
2011	The Iron Lady	Doctor	
2012	Rage	William	Short film
2013	Summer in February	Colonel Paynter	
2014	Born of War	Ian	
2014	Luna	Dean	
2014	Two Horrible Little Girls	Clive	Short film
2015	The C Word	Ian McFarlane	Television film
2015	The Other Side of Home	Ian	Short film
2021	A Brixton Tale	Simon	
2021	Three Pints and a Rabbi	Ian	
2021	Where Is Anne Frank	Otto Frank	Voice role
2021	Belfast	Frankie West	
2021	Lawrence: After Arabia	George Brough	
2022	Help! I've Stolen Amy Adams' Nose!	Kat's Dad	Short film
2022	Care	Alan	Short film
2022	Reaching Four	Dr Maloney	Short film
2023	Best of Three	Stewart	Short film

=== Television ===
Year	Title	Role	Notes
1979	Telford's Change	Peter Telford	Series regular; 9 episodes
1981	Kinvig	Simon	Episode: "The Humanoid Factor"
1982	The Bell	Toby Gashe	Miniseries; 4 episodes
1984	Minder	Father Andrew	Episode: "Willesden Suite"
1985	The Last Place on Earth	Lieutenant "Teddy" Evans	Miniseries, 6 episodes
1986	What If It's Raining	Dominic	Miniseries; 3 episodes
1987	Screen Two	Henry Kirk	Episode: "Naming the Names"
1988	Theatre Night	Faulkland	Episode: "The Rivals"
1988	ScreenPlay	Gary	Episode: "Starlings"
1988–95	Jackanory	Storyteller	Recurring role; 6 episodes
1989	4 Play	Powell	Episode: "Nobody Here But Us Chickens"
1989	The Jim Henson Hour	Lee Marshall	Episode: "Living with Dinosaurs"
1990	Screen Two	Tony	Episode: "The Lorelei"
1991	He-Play	Angel	Episode: "The Dogs"
1992	Mr Wakefield's Crusade	Richard	Miniseries; 2 episodes
1993	Comedy Playhouse	Mike	Episode: "The Complete Guide to Relationships"
1993	The Young Indiana Jones Chronicles	Arnold Toynbee	Episode: "Paris, May 1919"
1994	Love on a Branch Line	Jasper Pye	Miniseries; 4 episodes
1994	Shakespeare: The Animated Tales	Clarence / Norfolk	Episode: "Richard III"
1995	Signs and Wonders	Stephen Palmore	Miniseries; 4 episodes
1997	Painted Lady	Oliver Peel	Miniseries; 2 episodes
1998	Children of the New Forest	Charles Stuart, King of England	Miniseries; 6 episodes
1999	Heartbeat	Cecil Palmer	Episode: "David Stockwell's Ghost"
2000	Dalziel and Pascoe	David Ransom	Episode: "Above the Law"
2001	Magic Grandad	Mr. Leyton	Recurring role; 3 episodes
2002	In Deep	Dr. Gabriel Winterbourne	Episode: "Abuse of Trust"
2002	The Swap	Tom Forrester	Miniseries; 2 episodes
2002	The Jury	Peter Segal	Series regular; 6 episodes
2002	Nova	Thomas Orde-Lees / George Marston	Episode: "Shackleton's Voyage of Endurance"
2002	Believe Nothing	Brian Albumen	Series regular; 6 episodes
2003	The Forsyte Saga	Prosper Profond	Recurring role; 4 episodes
2003	Henry VIII	Thomas Cranmer	Miniseries; 2 episodes
2004	The Last Detective	John Swannee	Episode: "Benefit to Mankind"
2004	Let's Write a Story	Adult Charles	Episode: "The Personal History of Charles Dickens"
2004	Messiah III: The Promise	Carl Henderson	Miniseries; 2 episodes
2005	The Murder Room	Neville Dupayne	Miniseries; 2 episodes
2005	Empire	Gaius Cassius Longinus	Miniseries; 3 episodes
2005	Monarch of the Glen	Dr Simon Cotter	Episode: "Series 7, Episode 4"
2005	Timeshift	Narrator	Episode: "A Study in Sherlock"
2006	Rosemary & Thyme	Custos	Episode: "In a Monastery Garden"
2006	Lewis	Ivor Denniston	Episode: "Reputation"
2006	Agatha Christie's Marple	Dr Joshua Waters	Episode: "By the Pricking of My Thumbs"
2006	Hotel Babylon	Mr Johnson	Episode: "Series 1, Episode 6"
2006	New Tricks	John Fletcher	Episode: "Old Dogs"
2006	Ancient Rome: The Rise and Fall of an Empire	Senator Natalis	Episode: "Nero"
2006	Spooks	John Russell	Episode: "The Criminal"
2006	Robin Hood	Pitts	Recurring role; 2 episodes
2007	The Bill	Ryan Jones	Recurring role; 2 episodes
2007	Wire in the Blood	Jonathan Goode	Episode: "Anything You Can Do"
2008	Heroes and Villains	Vigilas	Episode: "Attila the Hun"
2008	Waking the Dead	Dr Damien Hooper	Episode: "Sins"
2008	Bonekickers	Daniel Mastiff	Series regular; 6 episodes
2008	Heartbeat	Dr Thomas	Episode: "Mixed Messages"
2008	Wired	Hugh Borne	Miniseries; 1 episode
2009	Law & Order: UK	Mr John Reberty	Episode: "Sacrifice"
2009	The Queen	Michael Shea	Episode: "The Rivals"
2010	Midsomer Murders	Simon Sharpe	Episode: "Master Class"
2010	Fluffy Gardens	Narrator	
2010	Casualty	Howard Fairfax	Recurring role; 5 episodes
2010	Identity	John Knighton	Episode: "Chelsea Girl"
2011	DCI Banks	Malcolm Austin	Episode: "Friend of the Devil"
2011	Death in Paradise	Father Charles Dean	Episode: "Predicting Murder"
2012	Coronation Street	Robert Millward	Recurring role; 5 episodes
2012	Accused	Judge	Recurring role; 4 episodes
2012	The Thick of It	Matthew Hodge	Episode: "Series 4, Episode 6"
2013	Father Brown	Kalon	Episode: "The Eye of Apollo"
2013	The White Queen	Henry Stafford	Miniseries; 5 episodes
2013	By Any Means	Laurence Walker	Miniseries; 1 episode
2014	Fleming: The Man Who Would Be Bond	Edmund Rushbrooke	Miniseries; 4 episodes
2014	New Worlds	Hardwick	Miniseries; 4 episodes
2014	Utopia	Christian Donaldson	Recurring role; 3 episodes
2015	River	Tom Read	Miniseries; 5 episodes
2016	Mr Selfridge	Mr. Donaghue	Recurring role; 2 episodes
2016	The Five	Alan Wells	Miniseries; 10 episodes
2016	Paranoid	Dr Crowley	Miniseries; 8 episodes
2017	Victoria	Bishop	Episode: "Faith, Hope & Charity"
2018	Midsomer Murders	Neville Gallagher	Episode: "The Lions of Causton"
2019	Shakespeare & Hathaway: Private Investigators	George Gonzalo	Episode: "Outrageous Fortune"
2019	The Crown	Edward Heath	Recurring role; 3 episodes
2019–20	The Trial of Christine Keeler	Bill Astor	Miniseries; 6 episodes
2020	Silent Witness	Judge Christopher Lansing	Episode: "Seven Times"
2022	Father Brown	Gerald Firth	Episode: "The Children of Kalon"
2022	Magpie Murders	Charles Clover	Series regular; 5 episodes
2022	All Creatures Great and Small	Albert Sebright Saunders	Recurring role; 2 episodes
2023	Dalgliesh	Desmond Ulrick	Episode: "A Certain Justice"
2026	Marble Hall Murders (TV series)	Charles Clover	Recurring role; 1 episode

== Radio ==
- Stephen Smith in A Pair of Blue Eyes, adaptation of a novel by Thomas Hardy, broadcast on BBC Radio 4 in 1982, directed by Cherry Cookson.
- Bran in Earthsearch II, James Follett's 1982 "new adventure serial in time and space" on BBC Radio 4.
- Frankenstein, a 1994 BBC Radio 4 adaptation of the original novel by Mary Shelley, dramatized by Nick Stafford and directed by Claire Groves, in which he played Victor Frankenstein.
- Troy, 1998 trilogy of radio plays written by Andrew Rissik and directed by Jeremy Mortimer – Hector
- Lord Arthur Savile's Crime, BBC 7 2003. Produced in Manchester by Katherine Beacon.
- Scenes of Seduction, radio play written by Timberlake Wertenbaker and directed by Ned Chaillet, broadcast on BBC Radio 4 7 Mar 2005 – Henry (King Henry V).
