= Herbert Tarr =

American novelist

- Herbert Tarr
- Born: Herbert Targovik; 1929; Brooklyn, New York
- Died: November 18, 1993 (aged 63–64); Roslyn Heights, Long Island, New York
- Occupations: Novelist, Rabbi
- Writing career
- Genre: Literary fiction
- Notable works: The Conversion of Chaplain Cohen; Heaven Help Us!

Herbert Tarr (1929 – November 18, 1993), born Herbert Targovik, was an American Reform rabbi who left his pulpit to become a novelist and humorist, believing he could reach more people that way because "religion is basically out of touch with people."

== Biography ==
Tarr was born in Brooklyn, New York. He attended Brooklyn College, graduating magna cum laude. Later he earned advanced degrees in a number of academic areas, including philosophy, contemporary literature and drama, from institutions including Herzliah Hebrew Teachers Institute-Jewish Teachers Seminary, Columbia University, and the Hebrew Union College-Jewish Institute of Religion.

He was ordained as a rabbi in 1955 and entered the United States Air Force to serve as a military chaplain. This experience inspired some of his first novel, The Conversion of Chaplain Cohen. In it, he explore how a young civilian rabbi was "converted" to the role of a military chaplain who helps men and women of all faiths.

Following his service as a chaplain, Tarr served as the rabbi of a synagogue in Buffalo, New York. In 1960, he moved to a congregation in Westbury, New York. In 1963 he decided to leave the pulpit to pursue a career as a novelist full-time, believing that he could be more effective in terms of reaching others that way.

He said, "[R]eligion is basically out of touch with people". He wanted to help people "contemplate their lives," to consider "how they fit into the world around them". He wrote with humor, through stories that carried values and ideals. As the playwright Brendan Behan wrote in a review for his first novel, The Conversion of Chaplain Cohen (1963), while Tarr "has us busy laughing, he's throwing sermons at us behind our backs".

A Kirkus Review of his work So Help Me God! affirmed Tarr's mixture of humor and serious messages, noting that

Tarr's easy-going and companionable rambles through American Jews' spiritual and secular preoccupations (Heaven Help Us!, 1968) continue to amuse, but here he explores some deeply serious and disturbing matters such as Vietnam, the plight of Soviet Jewry, and the essence of religion.

Tarr used his experiences as a pulpit rabbi and military chaplain to inform his writings, and also used his rabbinic knowledge. For example, his novel, A Time for Loving, is based on the Biblical book, The Song of Solomon (also known as the Song of Songs).

Tarr wrote one play, "The New Frontier," a comedy that held tryouts in New Haven and Philadelphia, with the hope that it would make it to Broadway.

Tarr died of liver cancer at the age of 64 on November 18, 1993, at the home of his sister, in Roslyn Heights, New York.

== Legacy ==
The North Shore Institute for Adult Jewish Learning, a joint educational program serving 18 synagogues and one Jewish community center in the Long Island area, was renamed the Herbert Tarr North Shore Institute for Adult Jewish Learning in his memory. The 2012 season of the Jewish Studies and Lectures Program opened at Temple Judea in Roslyn, New York in October 2012.

Tarr's 1979 novel, So Help Me God!, published seven years after the 1972 ordination of Sally Priesand includes a rabbinical student Isaca Zion. Zion is an important figure in the novel, but is not portrayed as the protagonist. By the end of the novel, Zion receives ordination. It is thought that Zion is the first fictional woman rabbi in contemporary American fiction.

== Bibliography ==
- The Conversion of Chaplain Cohen. B. Geis Associates. 1963. "The Conversion of Chaplain Cohen."
- Heaven Help Us!. Random House. 1968. ISBN 9780297764687.
- A Time for Loving. Random House. 1973. ISBN 0394461584. "a time for loving."
- So Help Me God!. Times Books. 1979. ISBN 0812908279.
