= In the Red (radio series) =

UK radio program

In the... Series
- BBC Audio cassette cover (1998)
- Genre: Comedy drama, Crime
- Running time: 30 minutes
- Country of origin: United Kingdom
- Language: English
- Home station: BBC Radio 4
- Starring: Michael Williams; Barry Foster
- Created by: Mark Tavener
- No. of series: 4

In the Red is the first in a sequence of four black comedy-crime drama series created for BBC Radio 4 by Mark Tavener featuring Michael Williams as BBC Reporter George Cragge and Barry Foster as Police Superintendent Frank Jefferson.

The first seven-part series (BBC Radio 4, 1995), was adapted by Tavener and comedy-writer Peter Baynham from Tavener's novel of the same name (Hutchinson, 1989), which had been inspired by the writer's early experiences working for the BBC and the Liberal Party.

The subsequent series, In the Balance (BBC Radio 4, 1997), In the Chair (BBC Radio 4, 1998), and In the End (BBC Radio 4, 1999), were all six-parts each and followed the same format, with the two lead characters investigating a series of murders often linked to British politics and media. There was also a three-part television series based on the original novel (BBC Two, 1998), adapted by Malcolm Bradbury, featuring Warren Clarke as Cragge and Alun Armstrong as Jefferson.

Following the conclusion of the final series, the characters of Charles Prentis, played by Stephen Fry, and Martin McCabe, played by John Bird, who appeared in In the Red (BBC Radio 4, 1995), In the Chair (BBC Radio 4, 1998), and In the End (BBC Radio 4, 1999), as well as the TV production of In the Red (BBC Two, 1998), were featured in their own spin-off series Absolute Power (BBC Radio 4, 2000-2006/BBC Two, 2003–2005), which was also created and written by Tavener.

== Series ==
=== In the Red ===
In the Red
- Written by: Mark Tavener; Peter Baynham
- Produced by: Paul Schlesinger
- Edited by: Scott Cherry
- Original release: 5 January – 16 February 1995
- No. of episodes: 7
- Opening theme: Paul Mottram

In the Red is a seven-part BBC Radio 4 black comedy-crime drama series adapted by Mark Tavener and Peter Baynham from Tavener's novel of the same name (Hutchinson, 1989), and produced by Paul Schlesinger.

The story features BBC Reporter George Cragge, played by Michael Williams, and Police Superintendent Frank Jefferson, played by Barry Foster, investigating a series of murders of London bank managers, a small political party contesting a by-election, and a plan to overthrow the Director-General of the BBC.

Notable guest stars include Julian Rhind-Tutt and Peter Serafinowicz, as well as, Stephen Fry and John Bird, who would reprise their roles of Charles Prentis and Martin McCabe in the follow-up series In the Chair (BBC Radio 4, 1998), and In the End (BBC Radio 4, 1999), the TV adaptation In the Red (BBC Two, 1998), and their own spin-off series Absolute Power (BBC Radio 4, 2000-2006/BBC Two, 2003–2005).

This series was released on audio cassette (BBC Audio, 1998, ISBN 0-5633-8807-2) follow the production of the television adaptation of the same name (BBC Two, 1998).

=== In the Balance ===
In the Balance
- Written by: Mark Tavener
- Produced by: Paul Schlesinger
- Edited by: Scott Cherry
- Original release: 6 February – 13 March 1997
- No. of episodes: 6

In the Balance is a six-part BBC Radio 4 black comedy-crime drama series written by Mark Tavener and produced by Paul Schlesinger as a sequel to In the Red.

The story features BBC Reporter George Cragge, played by Michael Williams, and Police Superintendent Frank Jefferson, played by Barry Foster, investigating a series of murders of during a FIFA World Cup at Wembley Stadium, a summit of EU leaders and an upcoming general election

Notable guest stars include Robert Bathurst, Jim Carter and Geoffrey Whitehead.

=== In the Chair ===
In the Chair
- Written by: Mark Tavener
- Produced by: Paul Schlesinger
- Original release: 5 June – 10 July 1998
- No. of episodes: 6

In the Chair is a six-part BBC Radio 4 black comedy-crime drama series written by Mark Tavener and produced by Paul Schlesinger as a second sequel to In the Red.

The story features BBC Reporter George Cragge, played by Michael Williams, and Police Superintendent Frank Jefferson, played by Barry Foster, investigating a series of murders of dentists linked to New Labour policy.

Notable guest stars include Hugh Laurie, Kenneth Cranham, Rebecca Front and Richard Griffiths, as well as the return of Stephen Fry, John Bird and Geoffrey Whitehead from previous series.

=== In the End ===
In the End
- Written by: Mark Tavener
- Produced by: Paul Schlesinger; Dawn Ellis
- Original release: 18 November – 23 December 1999
- No. of episodes: 6

In the End is a six-part BBC Radio 4 black comedy-crime drama series written by Mark Tavener and produced by Paul Schlesinger and Dawn Ellis as a third sequel to In the Red.

The story features BBC Reporter George Cragge, played by Michael Williams, and Police Superintendent Frank Jefferson, played by Barry Foster, investigating a series of murders of journalists.

Notable guest stars include Anton Rodgers and David Holt, as well as the return of Stephen Fry, John Bird and Rebecca Front from previous series.
