= In the Red (TV series) =

- Genre: Crime drama, black comedy
- Created by: Malcolm Bradbury
- Based on: In the Red by Mark Tavener
- Starring: Alun Armstrong; Victoria Carling; Sally Phillips; Warren Clarke; David Ryall; Richard Griffiths; Rebecca Front; Stephen Fry; John Bird; Reece Shearsmith; Patrick O'Kane
- Theme music composer: Slinkyhead
- Composer: Jonathan Whitehead
- Country of origin: United Kingdom
- Original language: English
- No. of series: 1
- No. of episodes: 3

Production
- Executive producer: Jon Plowman
- Producer: Sarah Smith
- Production locations: London, England, UK
- Running time: 57 minutes

Original release
- Network: BBC Two
- Release: 26 May – 9 June 1998

Related
- In the Red (1995); Absolute Power

In the Red is a three-part BBC Two black comedy-crime drama 1998 series featuring Warren Clarke as BBC Reporter George Cragge and Alun Armstrong as Police Superintendent Frank Jefferson, investigating a series of murders of London bank managers, a small political party contesting a by-election, and a plan to overthrow the Director-General of the BBC.

The series was adapted by Malcolm Bradbury from Mark Tavener's novel of the same name (Hutchinson, 1989), which had been inspired by the writer's early experiences working for the BBC and the Liberal Party.

Following the conclusion of the series, the characters of Charles Prentis, played by Stephen Fry, and Martin McCabe, played by John Bird, who also appeared in the radio adaptation of the book (BBC Two, 1995–1999), were featured in their own spin-off series Absolute Power (BBC Radio 4, 2000–2006/BBC Two, 2003–2005), which was also created and written by Tavener.
