= Junior Burke =

American songwriter

- Born: Thomas Burke Bishop, Jr. United States
- Occupations: Writer, songwriter, educator (former)
- Years active: 2005–present
- Notable work: Something Gorgeous, A Thousand Eyes, The Cold Last Swim, Buddha Was a Cowboy
- Awards: Naropa University's President's Award (2008); Sidewise Award Finalist (2020); Chanticleer Mark Twain Book Award Finalist (2022)

Thomas Burke Bishop, Jr., known professionally as Junior Burke, is an American fiction writer, songwriter and (former) educator.

== Fiction ==
Junior Burke's debut novel Something Gorgeous was published in 2005.

In 2005, Burke founded the online literary journal Not Enough Night and served as Executive Editor until he chose to discontinue publication in 2014. Two of the interviews Burke conducted for the journal were reprinted: Edward Sanders in "Beats at Naropa" (2009) and "Conversations With Gary Snyder" (2017).

A Thousand Eyes, an eco-horror novel, was published in 2018 in the UK and US by Cosmic Egg Books, an imprint of John Hunt Ltd.

In 2020, The Cold Last Swim was published by Gibson House Press, one of five finalists for a Sidewise Award, the annual prize for works of Alternate History.

The short story "The Evan Price Signature Model" was included in the May 2021 anthology Collectibles, edited by Lawrence Block and published by Subterranean Press.

Burke's novel Buddha Was a Cowboy was published by Gibson House Press in September 2022. It was a finalist for the Chanticleer International Mark Twain Book Award in the category of Humor and Satire and is on the Mountain and Plains Independent Booksellers Association Reading the West fiction longlist.

== Songwriter ==
Junior Burke's original recordings include "While You Were Gone" (2007) "Spot of Time" (2018) and the EP "Nothin' But" (2021). He also contributed selections to the compilations “Harry’s House” Volumes I (2012) and II (2014)

== Educator ==
In 2002, for Naropa University, Burke designed and implemented a highly successful low residency MFA degree in Creative Writing. After three years of directing that program, he was tapped to be Chair of Naropa's Jack Kerouac School of Disembodied Poetics in Boulder, Colorado, serving from January 2006 to June 2010. In May 2008, Burke was the recipient of Naropa's President's Award for "extraordinary dedication and service" throughout that academic year. He remained at Naropa until 2020, at which time he informed the university he would no longer be serving on its faculty, deciding to focus exclusively on creative writing.
