= Inspector Steine =

BBC radio comedy drama series, 2007–2013

- Genre: Comedy
- Running time: 28 minutes
- Country of origin: United Kingdom
- Language: English
- Home station: BBC Radio 4
- Starring: Michael Fenton Stevens; John Ramm; Matt Green; Jan Ravens; Samantha Spiro
- Written by: Lynne Truss
- Produced by: Karen Rose
- Original release: 26 January 2007 – 23 December 2013
- No. of series: 4
- No. of episodes: 25
- Audio format: Stereophonic sound

Inspector Steine is a radio comedy drama series written by Lynne Truss and produced by Sweet Talk for BBC Radio 4. The producer is Karen Rose and music is by Anthony May.

Set in a police station in Brighton in the 1950s, it tells the story of Inspector Steine (Michael Fenton Stevens) and his colleagues Sergeant Brunswick (John Ramm) and Constable Twitten (Matt Green), plus the station charlady Mrs Groynes (Jan Ravens in Series 1 and Samantha Spiro from Series 2 onwards).

Guest stars have included Janet Ellis, Mark Heap, Allan Corduner and Carla Mendonca.

The programme was inspired by the opening rolling caption about crime in Brighton at the beginning of the film Brighton Rock, which claimed that Brighton was now (in the 1950s) free of crime. Lynne Truss has written that: "This highly unrealistic reassurance prefacing Brighton Rock was the inspiration for the comedy series Inspector Steine...I wanted to write about a celebrity police inspector in the 1950s who innocently (and touchingly) believed precisely what he had been told at the movies"

Four series of six episodes each were broadcast from 2007 to 2011, followed by a one-off Christmas episode "The Christmas of Inspector Steine" which was broadcast as part of the Afternoon Drama strand on BBC Radio 4 on 23 December 2013.

== Episodes ==
=== Series 1 ===
No. overall	No. in series	Title	Original release date
1	1	"Operation Whooooo!"	26 January 2007
When a headless corpse is found on the ghost train on the Palace Pier, Steine puts the death down to natural causes. But can new policeman Twitten help Brunswick prove otherwise?
2	2	"His Last Review"	2 February 2007
A famous foppish London theatre critic is found dead in his seat at the Theatre Royal after a performance of a kitchen-sink drama.
3	3	"Eyes Down"	9 February 2007
Steine decides to go undercover at the Black Cat Casino, much to Brunswick's profound dismay. Meanwhile, a robbery takes place in the bank next door to the police station.
4	4	"That's the Way to Do It"	16 February 2007
When Vince the Ventriloquist moves his booth to a new pitch on the Brighton seafront, he receives threats from an unknown source. But Inspector Steine is more concerned with judging the knickerbocker glory competition.
5	5	"The Woman"	23 February 2007
Steine falls in love for the very first time when he bumps into Adelaide Vine, the beautiful owner of a fish and chip shop in Oriental Place. But is there more to Adelaide than meets the eye? Brunswick thinks so.
6	6	"The Anniversary"	2 March 2007
It's the five-year anniversary of the Middle Street Massacre. While Steine ponders on how to celebrate, Mrs Groyne's deranged nephew, Brian the Brain, breaks out of Broadmoor with revenge on his lips.

=== Series 2, The Casebook of Inspector Steine ===
No. overall	No. in series	Title	Original release date
7	1	"The Entertainer"	4 April 2008
Crime is at a low ebb, but Mrs Groynes, the cockney charlady who is actually a criminal mastermind, is determined to reverse the trend. A matinee performance at the Hippodrome gives her an idea.
8	2	"On the Road"	11 April 2008
A day out in a singular vintage car turns out to be highly eventful, thanks to a certain cockney charlady.
9	3	"The Smallest Show on Earth"	18 April 2008
Brunswick organises a police open day, featuring a range of criminal exhibits. What could possibly go wrong?
10	4	"The Uses of Literacy"	25 April 2008
Acting on a mysterious tip-off, Brunswick goes under cover as a careers master in a prestigious girls' school. An eminent former pupil who has been invited to open a new science block is also a criminal mastermind.
11	5	"Room at the Top"	2 May 2008
Steine is delighted to meet Lord Melamine, who offers to sell him a gold brick at a knockdown price. But is his lordship all he seems to be?
12	6	"Endgame"	9 May 2008
Constable Twitten's idea of acquiring a police dog seems an excellent idea, especially when Bobby solves a notorious murder case. But why does Bobby keep attacking poor old Mrs Groynes, and why is Steine's life suddenly in great danger?

=== Series 3, The Adventures of Inspector Steine ===
No. overall	No. in series	Title	Original release date
13	1	"While the Sun Shines"	25 September 2009
It's six months on and Twitten is back from a secondment at Scotland yard. But all is not well at the station since Brunswick is more depressed than ever. To cheer him up Twitten arranges for Brunswick's favourite crime reporter Harry Jupiter to interview him and Brunswick is jubilant. But then Steine gets involved and disaster follows.
14	2	"Separate Tables"	2 October 2009
Brunswick has been sent undercover indefinitely in the hope that it will make him forget his deadly grudge against Inspector Steine. But Mrs Groynes seems more interested in Twitten's criminal records.
15	3	"Harlequinade"	9 October 2009
Brunswick is in mortal danger, but Inspector Steine is more interested in setting up a road safety demonstration. Can Twitten and Mrs Groynes save Brunswick before it's too late?
16	4	"Variation on a Theme"	16 October 2009
Brunswick is back with his dear friends from the station, just in time for the annual cricket match between the villains and the police. But Steine's life continues to be under threat. So if it's not Brunswick, who is responsible?
17	5	"In Praise of Love"	23 October 2009
Inspector Steine is compering a beauty pageant on Brighton seafront. But when Brunswick's old flame Doris reappears as a contestant, Brunswick is thrown into emotional turmoil - which is probably why he doesn't notice that the south east's big-shot criminals are converging on Brighton.
18	6	"The Deep Blue Sea"	30 October 2009
It is Twitten's birthday but no one's in the mood to celebrate - Mrs Groynes has a problem with contraband and lovesick Brunswick is threatening to resign, so Twitten suggests that a boat trip might solve things all round.

=== Series 4, The Return of Inspector Steine ===
No. overall	No. in series	Title	Original release date
19	1	"Towards the End"	17 October 2011
Second World war Bomb disposal hero Captain 'mad Hoagy' Hoagland, now fallen on hard times, appears at Brighton Police Station to deliver two boxes. One contains a silver truncheon; an award for valour for Sergeant Brunswick. The other contains the head of one of Mrs Groynes' old criminal accomplices Birthmark Potter. It is a warning to them all that Mrs G's criminal nemesis Adelaide Vine is heading back to Brighton, and that the sadistic criminal Terence Chambers is heading for town too; both hell bent on havoc and revenge.
20	2	"Nearer to the End"	24 October 2011
Captain 'mad Hoagy' Hoagland reassures a doubtful Sergeant Brunswick that he does indeed deserve his silver truncheon award for bravery, and saves the day at the bandstand presentation ceremony of this presentation when he defuses a ticking bomb in a box with the aid of his old army bomb disposal team member Terence Chambers, who discovers that criminal Adelaide Vine has arranged for the severed head of his old criminal fraternity friend Birthmark Potter to be placed in the ticking box so it will appear that Mrs Groynes is responsible for his murder. Vine is led off by Chambers to meet her fate at his hands, and the Brighton police station team learn that Inspector Steine can be persuaded into all kinds of useful behaviour by the employment of reverse psychology...
21	3	"The End in Sight"	31 October 2011
There's a talent contest at the Hippodrome, and Mrs G and Sergeant Brunswick take part in it and win with a new song. Inspector Steine has written and delivered a landmark broadcast on the topical legal case known to the newspapers as 'Tatiana and the Five Hats', and Fred Nesbit a Canadian film maker, and his English assistant Leslie, come to Brighton to make a film about the work of the Brighton police force. But Mrs G uncovers Leslie's plan to plot to show the police in a terrible light; revealing that he is in fact that most dreaded and feared of 1950s creatures; a Commie! It's becoming clear Mrs G is deeply smitten by Captain Hoagland, and also that Adelaide Vine is still alive, well and plotting further dastardly events to torment the Brighton police force, and Mrs G herself.
22	4	"The Home Stretch"	7 November 2011
Tons of bread and fish have been dumped all around the police station and the birds are reacting in a strange way. And talking of fishy, why is Inspector Steine behaving so peculiarly?
23	5	"Not Long"	14 November 2011
The Brighton police force is holed up in Inspector Steine's office without tea making equipment or biscuits. As the strain begins to show big secrets are revealed, finally.
24	6	"The End"	21 November 2011
The Brighton boys in blue, together with Mrs G and Hoagy, come out of their hiding place in the police station to face a devastating scene only to discover there's an unexploded mine on the beach. And that's not the least of their worries; evil Adelaide Vine and the sadistic Terence Chambers are back in town. Will anyone survive this final episode?

=== Christmas special, The Christmas of Inspector Steine ===
No. overall	No. in series	Title	Original release date
25	Sp.	"The Christmas of Inspector Steine"	23 December 2013
Mrs Groynes spends her first Christmas married to Captain Hoagland of the Royal Engineers.

== Audiobooks ==
Series 1 was released by BBC Audiobooks on 3 March 2008. Series 2 was released by BBC Audiobooks on 12 February 2009. Series 3 was released by BBC Audiobooks on 8 April 2010. Series 4 was released digitally by AudioGO on 15 July 2013.
