= Peggy Makins =

English agony aunt

- Born: 1916; Hammersmith, London, England
- Died: 2011 (aged 94–95)
- Occupation: Agony aunt

Peggy Makins (1916–2011) was an English agony aunt, who wrote for Woman magazine under the pen name Evelyn Home.

She was born in Hammersmith, London, England, in 1916.

She took over the column in Woman at the age of 21, having previously been its sub-editor, and continued to write it until retirement.

She appeared as a castaway on the BBC Radio programme Desert Island Discs on 8 May 1988. She also contributed regularly to Thought for the Day on the BBC Home Service.

She died on 8 December 2011.

== Bibliography ==
- —— (1975). The Evelyn Home Story. Collins. ISBN 978-0002112239.
- —— (1977). Evelyn Home's New Handbook of Marriage. Hutchinson. ISBN 978-0091286002.
- —— (1979). Thoughts, Prayers, Reflections. BBC Books. ISBN 978-0563176343.
