= High Table, Lower Orders =

2005–06 British radio programme

High Table, Lower Orders is a BBC Radio 4 comedy-drama murder mystery written by Mark Tavener and set in a fictional University of Cambridge college in crisis. The first series was broadcast in six episodes from 18 February to 25 March 2005, and the second from 7 April to 12 May 2006. Its title refers to the custom of the college's fellows eating at High Table, and the murders and skulduggery that occur in the series. The title and incidental music is Bach's Trio Sonata No. 2 in C minor (BWV 526), Largo, performed by the Purcell Quartet.

== Plot outline ==
Both series feature a murder mystery set against a background of satirical references to newspaper and television journalism, politics, government bureaucracy, and academic in-fighting. In particular there is a long-running feud between Gilbert (a history fellow, and later the master) and the dean of the college. The dean is the religious leader of the college, in charge of the chapel, the choir and religious services. The office was the most important in the college when it was founded, by monks. Actual authority has become vested in the master and, in an advisory capacity, the bursar. The current dean would like to regain the power that his predecessors lost.

=== Series 1 ===
Peter Devanti, a notorious TV populariser of history and member of the college, dies after being the college's guest at High Table. The apparent cause is eating nuts despite a known allergy. However, the college's Master suspects foul play. He invites Simon Harrison, a brilliant former biology student at the college who is now working in the Health and Safety Executive, a job he mostly finds tiresome, to investigate the suspicious death. At the same time, Zoe Redmond, a philosophy graduate and Simon's former girlfriend, loses her job as political sketch-writer on a national newspaper and is forced to freelance. Her first job is covering the aftermath of Devanti's death, which brings her back into contact with Simon, whom she left for Devanti on the eve of Simon's final undergraduate exam, and her tutor Patricia, who was also, it emerges, one of Devanti's conquests. Her reappearance opens old wounds for Simon, who drank himself into oblivion when she left him; he was consequently in no condition for his final exam, and failed to get the first-class honours degree that would have enabled him to pursue an academic career.

The Master himself dies, and various fellows, including the Machiavellian history don Gilbert Devlin, compete to replace him. Meanwhile, the list of people who might have wanted Peter Devanti dead keeps growing. Nearly everyone connected with the college had a reason to hate Devanti or want him removed, including anyone with the ambition to be Master, since Devanti himself was the obvious candidate to succeed. Most of the female characters had affairs with and were abandoned by Devanti, including Zoe and Patricia. Even the Bursar has been wounded by Devanti, as his sole academic venture was plagiarised by the television historian before its official publication.

In a subplot, Simon becomes so disenchanted with working at the HSE that he turns a speech at a conference in Europe into a denunciation of the nitpicking culture of the health and safety bureaucracy, much to the annoyance of the interpreter, who cannot translate words like "tosspottery". At the subsequent disciplinary hearing his line manager is shown to be incapable of either managing him or firing him, and he is shunted to a regional office.

=== Series 2 ===
A year after the events of Series 1, Simon and Zoe are living together in Cambridge, intending to marry. Zoe is now working for a "red top" tabloid newspaper. Simon is out of work, but is soon awarded a fellowship in "Forensic Science and Criminology" by Gilbert, the Master of the college. Ian Butterworth, a brilliant (if pedantic and intolerably smug) English student, apparently hangs himself after accusing another student of plagiarism. Both students were supervised by Dr Roisin McDade, a fellow in English. Simon is not convinced. Meanwhile, Bernard, the Bursar, is trying to reorganise the college to be more financially viable and relevant to the modern world. The Dean tries to engineer a revolution and abolish the post of Master, but is masterfully "shafted", as Gilbert puts it.

Central to the plot is a generous bursary that is intended for especially brilliant student candidates, and which was once awarded to the Dean himself. Roisin McDade was in the running for that same bursary.

Simon turns out to be an ineffectual teacher who frequently has his students watch episodes of CSI, especially if he needs to get away to pursue his investigations. However, when he solves the crime, the Master announces that instead of firing him he will use having a "criminologist who solves crimes" as publicity for the college.

Note: in the second series Zoe's last name is changed to "Templeton".

== Cast ==
=== Both series ===
- Gilbert Devlin, fellow in History and later Master — Geoffrey Palmer
- The Dean — Michael Maloney
- Simon Harrison, biology graduate turned Health and Safety Executive bureaucrat — Samuel West
- Zoe Redmond (renamed Zoe Templeton in Series 2), philosophy graduate turned journalist, and Simon's former girlfriend — Sharon Small
- Bernard, the college Bursar — Jonathan Coy
- Written by Mark Tavener
- Producer Dawn Ellis

=== First series ===
- Patricia, fellow in Philosophy — Rebecca Front
- The Master — Hugh Dickson
- Peter Devanti, heard posthumously through excerpts of his television programmes — Nicholas Boulton

=== Second series ===
- Dr Roisin McDade, fellow in English — Michelle Fairley
- Jane — Tracey Wiles
- Jim — Stephen Hogan
