= Patients Association =

Independent patient charity

The Patients Association is an independent charity operating in the UK that aims to improve patients' experience of healthcare. Established in 1963, it became a registered charity in 1991. The Patients Association works with patients directly: they are its members and supporters, and also the people who benefit from the organisation's help and advice services. The Chief Executive is Rachel Power, Julie Thallon is the Acting Chair.

== Activities and funding ==
The organisation runs a national helpline, "providing specialist information, advice and signposting to help people navigate the often complex world of health and social care." The helpline operates a telephone service and also responds to enquiries by email. Helpline advisers do not provide medical or legal advice to callers.

The Association reported in its 2018 Annual Review that 96 per cent of helpline callers would recommend the free service to friends and family members. The helpline receives calls on a range of health and social care issues: in 2020, the single biggest group of calls were from people seeking help to make a complaint about the care they had received, closely followed by people experiencing issues using digital apps to access NHS services. Issues about access to services were also common in 2020.

The Association also provides information on its website for patients and carers on a range of subjects: in 2021, the information on how to see your medical records was the most visited page on the website.

The Association involves patients in its work through focus groups and surveys, which provide the charity the evidence base it needs to speak up for patients with the NHS, Department of Health and Social Care, and the Government. During the pandemic it published three reports based on patients' experience of healthcare. In the reports, it was noted how difficult many patients had found it to access primary healthcare, especially their GPs. It was following the publication of the second report that all English GPs were required to restor face-to-face appointments for patients who needed them. The third report, published in January 2022, found that confidence about recovery from the pandemic is extremely low, with two thirds of respondents indicating they are not very or not at all confident that the health and care system will be able to recover to deliver high quality care and treatment.

In 2021, the Association launched its new five-year strategy, which focuses on embedding true patient partnership in health and social care.

The Patients Association's income for 2020 was £471,631 and it held reserves of £177,958 at the end of the year.

== History ==
The Patients Association was set up in 1963 by Helen Hodgson, "a part-time teacher who was motivated by recent events concerning the drug Thalidomide, and reports of patients receiving the wrong treatment and tests being carried out on patients without their informed consent."

The current Chief Executive, Rachel Power, was appointed in 2017 and has overseen a significant period of change for the charity. This has included increasing the Association's membership from 300 to more than 2000. Power was appointed to the NHS Assembly in 2019.
