= In the Red (novel) =

1989 black comedy-crime novel by Mark Tavener

- BBC Book cover (1998)
- Author: Mark Tavener
- Language: English
- Genre: Comedy, crime novel
- Publisher: Hutchinson
- Publication date: 1989
- Publication place: United Kingdom
- ISBN: 0-0917-4356-7

In the Red is a 1989 black comedy-crime novel by Mark Tavener, featuring fictional BBC Reporter George Cragge and fictional Police Officer Frank Jefferson, investigating a series of murders of London bank managers, a small political party contesting a by-election, and a plan to overthrow the Director-General of the BBC.

The novel's setting in the worlds of finance (from which it draws its title), politics and media, was inspired by the writer's early experiences working for the BBC and the Liberal Party.

The novel was released (BBC Books, 1998) following the production of a television adaptation of the same name (BBC Two, 1998).

== Adaptations ==
The seven-part radio adaptation of the same name (BBC Radio Four, 1995) by Tavener and Peter Baynham, starring Michael Williams and Barry Foster in the lead roles, was followed by three six-part sequels (BBC Radio Four, 1997–1999).

The three-part television adaptation of the same name (BBC Two, 1998) by Malcolm Bradbury stars Warren Clarke and Alun Armstrong in the lead roles.

The characters of Charles Prentis and Martin McCabe introduced in the novel were featured in their own spin-off series Absolute Power (BBC Radio 4, 2000-2006/BBC Two, 2003–2005), which was also created and written by Tavener.
