= Ibn Sukkara =

10th-century poet during Buyid Dynasty

Ibn Sukkara (died 15 May 995) was a poet from Baghdad, who was active during the Buyid era. He is noted for his satirical verses. According to al-Tha'alibi (died 1038), Ibn Sukkara's diwan (collection of short poems) consisted of no less than 50,000 verses. However, it has not survived.

Ibn Sukkara's biggest supporter was the Buyid vizier Abu Muhammad al-Hasan al-Muhallabi (died 963).

== Sources ==
- Papoutsakis, Nefeli (2021). "Ibn Sukkara". In Fleet, Kate; Krämer, Gudrun; Matringe, Denis; Nawas, John; Rowson, Everett (eds.). Encyclopaedia of Islam (3rd ed.). Brill Online. ISSN 1873-9830.
