= Absolute Power (radio and TV series) =

British comedy series

Absolute Power is a British comedy programme, set in the offices of Prentiss McCabe, a fictional public relations company (or 'government-media relations consultancy') in London, run by Charles Prentiss (Stephen Fry) and Martin McCabe (John Bird).

It started in 2000 on BBC Radio 4, lasting until 2004 with the fourth and final radio series. A six-part television series ran on BBC Two towards the end of 2003; the second six-episode television series ran on BBC Two on Thursdays at 10 pm from 21 July to 25 August 2005. A one-off radio episode was broadcast on 3 November 2006.

The title is taken from a quotation by the historian Lord Acton: "power tends to corrupt, and absolute power corrupts absolutely".

== Radio version ==
Absolute Power
- Running time: approx. 30 min. per episode
- Country of origin: United Kingdom
- Language: English
- Home station: BBC Radio 4
- TV adaptations: Absolute Power
- Starring: Stephen Fry; John Bird; Siobhan Hayes; Tony Gardner (series 1–3 and special); Tamsin Greig (series 2); Tom George (series 3–4); Henry Hereford (series 1); Alex Lowe
- Created by: Mark Tavener
- Written by: Mark Tavener
- Executive producer: Paul Schlesinger
- Original release: 5 January 2000 – 3 November 2006
- No. of series: 4 (plus 1 special)
- No. of episodes: 22
- Website: Absolute Power

The programme was devised and written by Mark Tavener, and logically follows the programme In the Red, In the Balance, In the Chair, and In the End which he wrote with Peter Baynham. In some of these, Prentiss and McCabe (again played by Fry and Bird) are elevated members of the BBC, before getting kicked out. Indeed, there is a scene on the last page of the novel In the Red, in which the newly appointed director general of the BBC gives them the sack. The idea is that after this they created Prentiss McCabe, which is the subject of Absolute Power. The tone and style of Absolute Power is so different from the In the... series that it can be regarded as a totally different programme. It was produced, like so much of Tavener's work, by Dawn Ellis.

Prentiss is a man without morals, whose only objectives are money and power. He is portrayed as being the brains, while McCabe, though an excellent speech-writer, lacks his motivation and insight. McCabe's ambitions include retiring and drinking claret, and he spends his life in a state of cynicism, lack of energy and boredom. McCabe (who describes himself as "a first class mind") does sometimes have good ideas, but they usually become Prentiss's ideas by the time they are presented to the client, and he lacks the energy to make more than mild objections. McCabe is also more likely to baulk at a scheme for moral reasons than Prentiss.

Stephen Fry said of Charles Prentiss, "He's a brute of a man, out to win, with no morals; he's completely shameless. There's not much to say that's nice about him, except that there is some pleasure in watching a natural born killer at work and knowing whatever happens he will win".

Prentiss and McCabe often find themselves working on behalf of two rival clients, one of whom is often the shadier side of the Labour government, often called their "Downing Street Retainer". This is usually something of an inconvenience as Prentiss is met by Archie Hilditch (Tony Gardner, Alex Lowe), a faceless member of the government, in a deserted location (such as Frank Dobson's campaign headquarters), and told he needs to ruin the popularity of the organisation that he has spent half the programme building up. For example, in one episode they're employed by the government to increase the popularity of the European Union, while also being employed by the Eurosceptic newspaper The Sun to increase sales. It is probably a good thing in the end, as the firm relies on these payments since neither Prentiss nor McCabe seems to want to do any real work.

The third member of the company is Sandy (Siobhan Hayes), who is there as the office trainee, getting work experience for her NVQ level 2. She usually does all the work that the partners in the firm cannot be bothered to do, such as filling out thousands of public opinion polls in different handwritings, though she will only agree to do something if it can be twisted into one of the 'nine levels of competence' of her NVQ. Another member of the office is the useless Clive (Tom George) or as Martin calls him, 'young, er, thing', who often turns publicity stunts into bloodbaths. He first appears in series three, after Sandy leaves the company to become a nurse (although due to her fiddling with the accounts, she still gets paid).

Another regular character is Maurice, the waiter at McCabe's club. Each time he serves McCabe's claret, he corrects the English pronunciation of Maurice (Morris) to the French (Maur-ees), and each time Prentiss puts him down with a verse like "One man by circumstance is in splendour set; whilst another irons pants in a laundrette. Go and iron my pants, Morris".

In series 1, one of the running jokes is the company trying to avoid working on "The Sir Harold Dixon Account." Although he is never heard, it is known that he is a Conservative politician. As the series goes on, Sandy becomes more frustrated, and in the last episode she changes jobs and starts working for Sir Harold. However, after allegations of sleaze, Sir Harold is made bankrupt and Sandy returns to Prentiss McCabe.

In series 2, another character was created, Gayle Shand, played by Tamsin Greig. Gayle was a former employee of Prentiss McCabe and Charles's former girlfriend, with whom she had a heavily sexual relationship (they often had sex whilst listening to classical music). However, the relationship fell apart after Gayle told Charles that she was already married to an insect specialist from Philadelphia. She now runs a rival firm to Prentiss McCabe, which is a much larger company, and is often trying to win Archie's contract, or is the agent of a rival client to Prentiss McCabe's current one. For example, whilst Charles and Martin work for the PM via Archie, Gayle is the spin doctor for the Chancellor of the Exchequer. Prentiss McCabe always come up with a plan to keep Archie on their side, despite Gayle's attempts to stop them, even trying to make Charles a partner in her firm.

Also introduced was her assistant, Janice, who suspected that Gayle's personal rivalry with Charles did not lead to the best decisions.

In the last episode of series 2, Gayle was leaving for America, and made one last bet with Charles. She bet her company against Charles's testicles that he could not make the Home Secretary say "prison doesn't work". Despite Charles's best attempts, Gayle won because she bribed the Home Secretary, as she was having an affair with someone in the Home Office. Luckily, she called off the bet providing Charles could have sex with her to the tune of the 1812 overture. Charles managed to get his own back, however, by planting some class A drugs in her suitcase as she left for America. Charles may nevertheless still have some feelings for her, and sometimes reminisces about their relationship.

A one-off special episode was broadcast on 3 November 2006, with Tony Gardner playing Archie. In the special, Martin goes to jail for seven years for fraud (having been implicated in the Cash for Peerages scandal). Archie, who has left New Labour, then blackmails Charles into giving him a job to prevent any more embarrassing information getting out about the company.

However, Charles soon learns that in fact Archie has framed both Martin and himself, with the assistance of Martin's girlfriend, and they are planning to take over Prentiss McCabe. After Charles finds proof, Archie goes to jail and Martin gets released, but as he has been moved to an open prison, he does not feel like leaving too soon.

The radio series is sometimes repeated on BBC Radio 4 Extra as part of the "Comedy Club" hour.

=== Hutton Report ===
The first episode of series 4 was controversially edited because of references to the Hutton Report. The words "manipulation and lying" were cut from Prentiss's line: "There's nothing Prentiss McCabe can teach this prime minister about deception, manipulation and lying, except how to do it properly".

== TV programme ==
Absolute Power
- Series title card
- Genre: Comedy satire
- Created by: Mark Tavener
- Directed by: John Morton; Tristram Shapeero
- Starring: Stephen Fry; John Bird; James Lance; Zoe Telford; Sally Bretton; Nick Burns
- Composer: Ben Bartlett
- Country of origin: United Kingdom
- Original language: English
- No. of series: 2
- No. of episodes: 12

Production
- Executive producer: Jon Plowman
- Producer: Paul Schlesinger
- Running time: approx. 29 mins. per episode

Original release
- Network: BBC Two
- Release: 10 November 2003 – 25 August 2005

Related
- In the Red

The television programme was written by Guy Andrews, Mark Lawson and Andrew Rattenbury, and had the tag "spin is dead, long live PR". Unlike most radio to TV sitcom transfers, none of the TV episodes was based on a radio episode. There are many differences to the radio version. Prentiss McCabe is a much more powerful and respected organisation than in the radio series. Martin McCabe is much more worldly wise. The secret meetings with government representatives are gone and replaced with more cups of coffee with newspaper editors and private secretaries.

While the radio programme has one trainee, the TV version has several young professionals working at the agency. Most notable are Jamie Front (James Lance) and Alison Jackman (Zoe Telford). While Jamie is a brilliant liar and naturally devious, Alison is very intelligent but too honest and somewhat literal-minded. Charles Prentiss said of her, "Most of the young people here at Prentiss McCabe don't know their arse from their elbow, but with Alison, at least you know she'll join the Royal Arse Society and get a book about elbows from the library". Also in the firm are Cat Durnford (Sally Bretton), the young party girl, and Nick Mayer (Nick Burns), Charles's personal assistant.

Instead of political schemes, the agency concentrates on working with celebrities: something that is rare in the radio version. In the radio episode where McCabe works with a Big Brother contestant, this is shown as an exceptional event, but would be normal behaviour in the TV series. Contrariwise, in the TV episode "The House of Lords", Charles is mildly surprised to be contacted by a government spin doctor.

Notable cameo and guest-starring roles in the television series have included:

- Fern Britton
- Tim Brooke-Taylor
- Angus Deayton
- Gareth David-Lloyd
- Huw Edwards
- Sharon Horgan
- Gareth Hunt
- Mark Lawson
- Dermot Murnaghan
- Geoffrey Palmer
- Anneka Rice
- Chipo Chung
- Phillip Schofield
- John Sessions
- Ray Stubbs
- Anthea Turner
- Kirsty Wark
- Matthew Wright

=== The London bombings ===
Owing to the terrorist attacks on London on 7 and 21 July 2005, the first episode of the second series (in which a member of the bin Laden family attempted to buy British Airways) was replaced by an episode from later in the series. The bin Laden episode was aired several weeks later.

== Episode list ==
=== The radio series ===
Series 1

- S01 E01 – Conservative Party (5 January 2000)
- S01 E02 – Relaunch of the Sun (12 January 2000)
- S01 E03 – Mayor of London (19 January 2000)
- S01 E04 – The Church of England (26 January 2000)
- S01 E05 – Radio 3 (2 February 2000)
- S01 E06 – English Sporting Success (9 February 2000)

Series 2

- S02 E01 – Martin is Bored (30 January 2001)
- S02 E02 – Promoting Philosophy (6 February 2001)
- S02 E03 – Relaunching a Literary Career (13 February 2001)
- S02 E04 – The Elderly Initiative (20 February 2001)
- S02 E05 – Prison Reform (27 February 2001)
- S02 E06 – Gayle Shand (6 March 2001)

Series 3

- S03 E01 – Poking the PM (1 January 2002)
- S03 E02 – Health Service (8 January 2002)
- S03 E03 – Big Brother (15 January 2002)
- S03 E04 – A Tennis Star (22 January 2002)
- S03 E05 – Men (29 January 2002)

Series 4

- S04 E01 – The BBC (5 February 2004)
- S04 E02 – The Notion of Nation (12 February 2004)
- S04 E03 – Healthy Eating (19 February 2004)
- S04 E04 – US Presidential Campaign (26 February 2004)

Special Episode – (3 November 2006)

=== The television programme ===
Series One

- S01 E01 – History Man (10 November 2003)
- S01 E02 – Pope Idol (17 November 2003)
- S01 E03 – Tory Woman (24 November 2003)
- S01 E04 – Mr Fox (1 December 2003)
- S01 E05 – Country Life (8 December 2003)
- S01 E06 – Crash and Burn (15 December 2003)

Series Two

- S02 E01 – The Nation's Favourite
- S02 E02 – The Trial
- S02 E03 – Blood Bank
- S02 E04 – The House of Lords
- S02 E05 – Spinning America
- S02 E06 – Identity Crisis

== Critical reception – television programme ==
Transferring a radio series to television can be risky [...] Absolute Power, however, succeeds where previous comedies have failed, and looks set to do for PR what Drop The Dead Donkey did for the newsroom. A good cast helps.

— The Independent, 8 November 2003

fitfully amusing comedy

— Stuart Price in the Independent on Sunday, 9 November 2003

The script presses the right buttons relentlessly. The names that are invoked contribute artfully to the atmosphere of heightened unreality. The idea of Mark Thatcher is tossed about in this corner, while the notion of Dennis Waterman is examined in another [...] I suppose it is a credit to all involved in the programme that I didn't like it at all. Although the characters are clearly exaggerations and grotesques, I felt they were probably close enough to the truth to be convincing. Form and content were perfectly matched. Like Trevor's World of Sport, of which this is clearly a superior relation, it is impossible to like any of the characters. [...] It delivers a stringently corrective dose of satire. It is quite appallingly knowing, and deliberately so.

— Pete Clark in the London Evening Standard, 11 November 2003

effortlessly witty comedy

— Terry Ramsay in the London Evening Standard, 11 August 2005

deliciously witty and sharp series, up there with Extras as one of the best comedies of the moment (or, indeed, any moment).

— Terry Ramsay in the London Evening Standard, 21 July 2005
