= At Last the 1948 Show =

1967 British satirical TV show

- Created by: Tim Brooke-Taylor; Graham Chapman; John Cleese; Marty Feldman
- Starring: Tim Brooke-Taylor; John Cleese; Graham Chapman; Marty Feldman; Aimi MacDonald
- Country of origin: United Kingdom
- No. of series: 2
- No. of episodes: 13 (2 missing)

Production
- Running time: 25 minutes
- Production company: Paradine Productions for Rediffusion London

Original release
- Network: ITV
- Release: 15 February – 7 November 1967

Related
- Do Not Adjust Your Set (1967–1969)

At Last the 1948 Show is a satirical television show made by David Frost's company, Paradine Productions (although it was not credited on the programmes), in association with Rediffusion London. Transmitted on Britain's ITV network in 1967, it brought Cambridge Footlights humour to a broader audience.

The show starred and was written by Tim Brooke-Taylor, Graham Chapman, John Cleese, and Marty Feldman. Cleese and Brooke-Taylor were also the programme editors. Aimi MacDonald (usually billed as "the lovely Aimi MacDonald") was the cheerfully ditsy host who introduced the show and also appeared in occasional (and brief) in-show linking segments, but she did not appear in sketches. The director was Ian Fordyce. Chapman and Cleese would later be among the founders of the Monty Python comedy troupe, and several of the sketches first performed in At Last the 1948 Show would later be performed by Monty Python in various formats. Cleese and Chapman's future Python partner Eric Idle appears as a bit part player in a few sketches; similarly, Brooke-Taylor's future Goodies partner Bill Oddie appears in some small roles.

While only two episodes of the show had been thought to survive, efforts to locate missing episodes have been fruitful. By 2013, seven episodes had been accounted for; on 23 October 2014, two episodes were recovered by the British Film Institute from the David Frost collection, and a further two episodes were recovered the following year, making the number of complete episodes eleven out of the original thirteen.

== History ==
Frost approached Cleese, Chapman and Brooke-Taylor to star in a sketch series. They suggested Marty Feldman, until then a comedy writer. The series bridged the radio series I'm Sorry, I'll Read That Again and television's Monty Python's Flying Circus and The Goodies. It also led to Feldman's television series Marty (which also featured Tim Brooke-Taylor). The convention of comedy scenes interspersed by songs was abandoned. It still used punchlines, which would often be dispensed with in Monty Python's Flying Circus.

Several sketches came from the 1963 Cambridge Footlights Revue entitled Cambridge Circus (the revue was previously entitled A Clump of Plinths), including Graham Chapman's solo routine "One-Man Wrestling". Certain sketches from the show would later be reused in the one-off John Cleese special How to Irritate People ("Freedom of Speech"), as well as the second episode of Monty Python's Fliegender Zirkus ("One-Man Wrestling" again – now with play-by-play commentary added by Cleese – and "Hearing Aid Shop"). Further sketches were reprised in the Python stage shows, including the "Four Yorkshiremen" sketch (as featured on Live at Drury Lane, Live at City Center, Monty Python Live at the Hollywood Bowl, and Monty Python Live (Mostly)), "One-Man Wrestling" once again (Drury Lane, City Center, and Hollywood Bowl), "Secret Service" (Drury Lane only), and a few that have never received official release: "Beekeeper," the aforementioned "Hearing Aid Shop," and "Minister Falling to Pieces". The "Beekeeper" sketch was also performed in the Secret Policeman's Ball stage shows, as were "Top of the Form" and "Take Your Clothes Off!". Another, the "Bookshop" sketch, was recorded in modified form for Monty Python's Contractual Obligation Album. New versions of "Door to Door Undertaker" and "Memory Training Course" were also recorded during that album's sessions, but not included on the final version (they would, however, end up appearing on the widely bootlegged Hastily Cobbled Together for a Fast Buck album). "Psychiatrist", "Tea Boy on a Mission", and "Grublian Holidays" were also performed again by The Two Ronnies.

Monty Python's catchphrase, "And now for something completely different," parodying a phrase often used on Blue Peter, originated in At Last the 1948 Show, and was originally spoken by Aimi MacDonald, who played a dumb blonde.

The shows had no relationship to the year 1948; according to Cleese, the title referred to television executives' tendency to dither extensively over commissioning decisions. Feldman claimed in eyE Marty, his posthumously published autobiography, that he came up with the title, which "meant nothing". The series was video-taped at Rediffusion's Wembley Studios.

A total of thirteen 25-minute episodes were made within a year, six in the first series and seven in the second.

=== Survival of episodes ===
Thames Television discarded the material once they had acquired the Rediffusion London archive, and all but two episodes were destroyed. John Cleese became aware of tapes from two surviving episodes after Feldman's wife left them to him in her will. Five compilation episodes for Swedish television also survived. Much missing material has been recovered in video, and surviving video has been restored by the British Film Institute.

The majority of a previously missing episode (season 2, episode 6, broadcast 31 October 1967) was recovered from a private collector in May 2010. On 23 October 2014, the BFI announced film copies of two previously missing episodes – the first and final episodes of the series (broadcast 15 February 1967 and 7 November 1967) – had been recovered from the private collection of the show's executive producer David Frost. A year later, the BFI announced the recovery of another two episodes from a fan's collection, with one of the new recoveries - the third episode of the first series (tx 1 March 1967) – to be screened at the Radio Times Festival at Hampton Court on 25 September 2015.

Out of an original total of 13 episodes, eleven now exist in complete or near-complete form, while two remain incomplete. While most surviving episodes are from original tapes or telerecordings, two of the complete episodes have been reconstructed from footage recovered from five compilation tapes returned from Sweden. The two incomplete episodes' surviving footage also comes from these compilations. The complete audio of all 13 episodes exists, recorded off air by several fans.

A 1967 LP release featured sketches taken from the soundtrack of the show's first series, accompanied by a 7" single featuring newly recorded versions of "The Ferret Song" and "The Rhubarb Tart Song". These have since been reissued on CD.

=== Home media ===
The five Swedish compilation episodes were released on DVD in July 2005 by Tango Entertainment in the US (Region 1) and in January 2007 by Pinnacle Vision in the UK (Region 2). This includes the Four Yorkshiremen sketch, written and performed by Cleese, Chapman, Brooke-Taylor and Marty Feldman. The DVD incorrectly states these as "recently recovered episodes", presents them as episode numbers 1 through 5, in the wrong compilation-series order (the correct order is DVD ep# 4, 3, 1, 5, 2), with no mention on the DVD that the content is in fact a compilation. The episodes on all DVD releases are soft, grainy, and generally low picture quality, even considering the material's age. Eric Idle appears in three of the episodes (2, 4, and 5), but never speaks except for a brief line in the teaser of episode 4.

The DVD was re-released in May 2012 by One Media iP, a digital-only (streaming media format) label (no physical DVD) based in the UK, available for free on their OMP YouTube channel. This release has the compilation episodes in the same (mis-)order, and includes the 2 bonus interview tracks from the original DVD as well. They describe the episodes as compilations, but their description of what original episodes they are taken from is wrong (one episode claims the excerpts are all from series 1 when in fact they are all from series 2).

In October 2015, One Media iP acquired the rights to three original full episodes that had recently been discovered, and released them on their YouTube channel as well. They are the two episodes discovered in David Frost's archives, ep. #1.1 and #2.7, and the episode discovered in a fan collection and screened in 2015, ep. #1.3. The three episodes are presented in the wrong aspect ratio: the picture is squeezed horizontally to a ratio of 1:1 square.

In recent years, some of the other surviving, original full episodes have been uploaded on YouTube and other video-sharing websites. All of these have since been removed, and new uploads continue to be removed, due to claimed copyright restrictions and new YouTube rules, as well as internet policing by One Media iP. The five compilation episodes (in the same mis-order) plus the three original full episodes released by One Media iP are still available for free on YouTube, on the free streaming service Tubi, and on Amazon Prime, the subscription streaming provider. On Tubi and Amazon Prime, the three original episodes are numbered 6 through 8 in order of broadcast: ep. #1.1, 1.3, and 2.7 respectively. On these latter two providers, the squeezed 1:1 aspect ratio of episode #7 (1.3) is corrected.

The British Film Institute released a comprehensive three-DVD set of the surviving material on 16 September 2019, including audio-only portions for all missing segments.

As of July 2020, the BritBox streaming service has the thirteen episodes available for viewing.

== Guest stars ==
- Barry Cryer as director in Chartered Accountants and Gorilla / first person to sit in Thief in Library / Nigerian guide & Eskimo guide in Studio Tour / Feldman in Scottish Opera / deerstalker hat detective in Detective Sketch / Wine waiter in Four Yorkshiremen / miscellaneous voice-over announcements
- Bill Oddie as depressed patient/Kowalski in Detective Sketch
- Christine Rodgers as Mrs. Lotterby / waving co-host / Susan / opera-host / introduces self in "I'm The Loveliest" show intro
- Eric Idle as Librarian in Thief in Library / Beethoven patient / waiter / elevator operator in Detective Sketch / end of row opera patron in Scottish Opera
- Jo Kendall as Mary in John and Mary in Malaya / Sara Mellish in Studio Tour
- Mary Maude as Lady in bath / introduces self in "I'm The Loveliest" show intro
- Dick Vosburgh as director in Studio Tour / bearded front row patron in Scottish Opera
- Antony Jay as stage manager in Studio Tour
- Frank Muir as Jordanian entourage member in Studio Tour
- Denis Norden as Jordanian entourage member in Studio Tour
- Ronnie Corbett as wrestling stage hand in Studio Tour
- Frances Dean as accented opera-host / introduces self in "I'm The Loveliest" show intro
- Karin Feddersen as Long haired brunette patron in Scottish Opera
- Jacqueline Rochelle as magic amulet opera-host
- Penny Brahms introduces self in "I'm The Loveliest" show intro
- Joan Crane as receptionist in Spiv Doctor / introduces self in "I'm The Loveliest" show intro
- Vicki Murden
- Anne Lewington
- Natalie Shaw
- Jenny Walton
- Patricia Franklin
- Dick Holmes

== List of episodes ==
Not all ITV regions screened the series, and those that did screened it on different transmission dates and times, with the series beginning and ending at different times of the year. Unless stated otherwise, the dates below reflect the transmission dates of the series in the London ITV region - Rediffusion's ITV franchise.

Audio recordings exist for all 13 episodes, with only a very few missing segments. These have been used to reconstruct the order of sketches in complete episodes.

=== Series 1 ===
Series 1 was not shown in the Granada region.

Episode	Original air date	Sketches	Archival status
Series 1, Episode 1	15 February 1967 (ITV)	Opening: Leave Tim Alone - Doctor Sketch (Man with Skinny Legs) - Witch (Restaurant Quickie) - Self-Wrestling (One-Man Wrestling) - Secret Service Chief Interview (Hit by Balls) - There's a Man in my Soup (Fly Noises) -Treasure Trove - Public Opinion (Vox Pop)	Complete except missing end credits; recovered in 2014
Series 1, Episode 2	22 February 1967 (ITV)	Opening: John in Bath - Foggy Spain Link - The Four Sydney Lotterbys - Lucky Gypsy Clothes Pegs - Judge Not	Incomplete; only first 5:45 of video footage and about a minute of 'Judge Not' exists from compilations. Full audio is available commercially.
Series 1, Episode 3	1 March 1967 (ITV)	Opening: Flying into New York - Bookshop - Visitors for the Use of... - Job Description (Do You Match This Description?) - Sheepdog Trials - Sleep Starvation - Mice Laugh Softly, Charlotte (Captured Spy)	Complete; recovered in 2015
Series 1, Episode 4	8 March 1967 (ITV)	Someone Has Stolen the News - Grublian Holidays (Grublia Tourist Office) - Jack the Ripper Song - Memory Training Course (Word Association) - One Man Battalion - Ministerial Breakdown (Minister Who Falls to Pieces) - Engine Driver Spriggs - Plain Clothes Police(wo)men (Undercover Policemen)	Complete; kinescope recovered in 1994
Series 1, Episode 5	15 March 1967 (ITV)	Rural Farm (Gentleman Farmer Dialect) - The Wonderful World of the Ant - Judo - John and Mary in Malaya - Top of the Form	Complete; kinescope recovered in 2003
Series 1, Episode 6	22 March 1967 (ITV)	Opening: Six Girls and Exhibit A - Televisione Italiano Presenta: Let's Speak-a English - Headmaster - Raid on a Crinolene Frock (The Siege in the Frock) - Real Life Drama (Choristers Repetition) - Chinese Restaurant - Beekeeping - The Ferret Song	Complete; kinescope

=== Series 2 ===
In the Granada region, each episode was shown three days after the dates specified below at 10.30 in the evening.

Episode	Original air date	Sketches	Archival status
Series 2, Episode 1	26 September 1967 (ITV)	Spiv Doctor (Doctor Trying to Sell Things) - Reptile Keeper Swallowed by Snake - Thief Hiding in Public Library - Joke Shop - Come Dancing	Incomplete; 18:30 of video footage exists from compilations; missing Joke Shop and some of the links
Series 2, Episode 2	3 October 1967 (ITV)	Opening: Bringing New Meaning to the Word Yech - Shirt Shop - The Nosmo Claphanger Show (Game Show) - Insurance for an Accident Prone Man - Take Your Clothes Off! - Rowdy Scottish Ballet Supporters (Thuggish Ballet)	Complete; kinescope from an almost complete compilation episode, except Clothes Off kinescope recovered from ABC Australia.
Series 2, Episode 3	10 October 1967 (ITV)	Opening: The Story So Far - Pessimistic Customer (Only Buying One Shoe) - Meek Bouncer - Men's Club (Old Men Dying in Club) - Look at Science (Insecure Neurotic Scientist) - Sydney Lotterby Craves the Test Score - Shop for the Sight and Sound Impaired (Hearing Aid & Contact Lens Shop)	Complete except missing end credits; kinescope recovered 1994
Series 2, Episode 4	17 October 1967 (ITV)	Discussion on Pornography - Teach Yourself a Foreign Language Record - Door to Door Undertaker - Uncooperative Burglars - Topic: Freedom of Speech - Programme Announcement (Repeats Report) - Studio Tour (Tour Through a Live Programme)	Complete; recovered in 2015
Series 2, Episode 5	24 October 1967 (ITV)	Opening: Reluctant Choir (Choir Won't Sing Hymns) - Psychiatrist - Deadly Architectural Model (Edible Town Square Model) - Secret Service Cleaner - Footballer on Trial (Reprimanded Soccer Player) - The Pretty Way (Western Quickie) - Misunderstood magazine programme	Complete except missing end credits; recovered 2003
Series 2, Episode 6	31 October 1967 (ITV)	Police Banquet - Sydney Lotterbys Renewed Acquaintance (Return of the Sydney Lotterbys) - The Chartered Accountant Dance - MI5 Banquet - Dentistry with a Difference - The Four Yorkshiremen	Complete; recovered in 2010
Series 2, Episode 7	7 November 1967 (ITV)	Current Affairs Programme - Railway Carriage (Train Travelling Pest) - Pet Shop (The Pathos of Pet Shops) - The Rhubarb Tart Song	Incomplete, missing Rhubarb Tart Song; recovered in 2014
