= Bob Oliver Rogers =

Bob Oliver Rogers (1950 – 1979) was a radio producer employed by the British Broadcasting Corporation, between 1973 and 1979, at the BBC's New Broadcasting House, Manchester.

He principally produced light entertainment shows for the BBC's national radio stations, including comedies, quizzes and panel games. He died of natural causes in 1979, aged 29.

== Radio ==
In a prolific career, as one of three staff producers in the radio comedy department of the BBC at New Broadcasting House, Manchester (alongside James Casey and Mike Craig), he produced many radio shows for the BBC: including Late Night Extra (presented on different occasions by Keith Fordyce, comedian Barry Cryer, John Dunn, and Brian Matthew), Frank Muir Goes Into (with Frank Muir and Alfred Marks), the topical satire Week Ending (a topical sketch show with David Jason, Bill Wallis and Chris Emmett), and Beat the Record (a phone-in quiz show presented by Don Davis).

He also produced the final series of the long running sketch comedy I'm Sorry, I'll Read That Again (starring Tim Brooke-Taylor, John Cleese, Graeme Garden, David Hatch, Jo Kendall and Bill Oddie), the 1973-74 Series of the panel game Just a Minute presented by Nicholas Parsons, the phone-in quiz Free Spin presented by Alan 'Fluff' Freeman, and Series 3 & 4 of the comedy sketch show Hello Cheeky (starring Barry Cryer, John Junkin and Tim Brooke-Taylor).

He devised and produced the long running quiz about comedy, Funny You Should Ask, chaired by the comedy actor Peter Jones. He also produced Northern comedies, including Chronicles of the Soppy Family and the sitcoms Malcolm, The Spamfritter Man, and Thank You Mrs Fothergill (this last starring Sheila Hancock, Pat Coombs and Avis Bunnage).

In late 1978 a program produced by Rogers for the BBC, Listen to the Banned, included the Sex Pistols' 'God Save the Queen' which was at that time banned by the broadcaster. The press reported that the BBC 'endorsed' Rogers' 'judgement... and the way he handled it.'

In addition to his other responsibilities, he was a talent spotter, perpetually on the lookout for promising new writers who could be commissioned to write for the shows he produced. One of his successes was in giving Rob Grant and Doug Naylor their first commission to write for radio.

Whilst working on a new radio series in 1979, The American Way of Laughs (a guided tour of comedy in the United States), he died unexpectedly of a heart attack aged 29. Comedy writer Ron McDonnell was appointed to take over as producer, pro tem, on those shows already in production; the new project was eventually produced in 1980 by Peter Everett.
