= The Minister Who Falls to Pieces =

Surreal British comedy sketch

"The Minister Who Falls to Pieces", also known as "The Minister Who Falls Apart" and "The Disintegrating Minister," was a surreal British comedy sketch. Though it was first heard on radio in a 1966 episode of I'm Sorry, I'll Read That Again, with John Cleese as the titular minister and David Hatch as the interviewer, it is probably best known in the version performed on television by Tim Brooke-Taylor and Graham Chapman in 1967 on At Last the 1948 Show. The sketch can be heard on the original soundtrack album of At Last the 1948 Show, which has been transferred to CD. Video of the sketch does exist and has circulated but is not at present commercially available.

== The Scenario ==
As heard on the soundtrack, "The Minister Who Falls to Pieces" takes the form of a TV news interview. Brooke-Taylor, playing the interviewer, welcomes Chapman, as "the Minister of Fuel, Mr. James Pemberton," to the "studio." As Chapman (speaking with a faintly Scottish accent and in a somewhat crotchety tone of voice), begins to answer Brooke-Taylor's first question, a clanging sound, as of a metal object hitting the floor, is heard (to giggles from the show's actual studio audience). "Good heavens," Chapman remarks. "My foot's dropped off." "It's gone to sleep," says Brooke-Taylor. "No, it's dropped off," reiterates Chapman. "It's fallen on the floor -- look. There it is under the table. It fell off!" A startled Brooke-Taylor attempts to continue with his questions but is continually interrupted by Chapman's cries (and more clanging) as he keeps losing body parts ("There goes the other one -- my feet have dropped off, both of them!...Oh, my thigh! My thigh's fallen off!") Brooke-Taylor becomes increasingly rattled and Chapman increasingly distracted by his own singular predicament ("I'm falling to pieces! Help!"); the interview itself falls apart and finally ends with Brooke-Taylor bidding Chapman, or what is left of him, goodnight.

== Humour ==
The sketch's humour can be called typically British because of its understated character (note the deadpan tone in which Chapman first announces he is falling apart) and because the interviewer attempts so valiantly and yet in vain to put a good face on an impossible situation. (The British are often said to be inordinately concerned with decorum and surface appearances.) Brooke-Taylor's role becomes more and more comically hapless, not only as Chapman's Minister continues to disintegrate but also as the "live" in-studio audience is heard to laugh louder and harder as the sketch becomes ever more absurd.

== Sources ==
- At Last the 1948 Show. With Tim Brooke-Taylor, Graham Chapman, John Cleese, Marty Feldman, and Aimi MacDonald. El Records, 2007.

Retrieved from The Four Sydney Lotterbies
