= Tony Buffery =

British Clinical Neuro-Psychologist

- Tony Buffery (2005)
- Born: Anthony Walter Harold Buffery; 9 September 1939; Birmingham, England
- Died: 26 December 2015 (aged 76)
- Occupations: Actor, Comedian, Educator, Psychologist

Anthony Walter Harold Buffery (9 September 1939 – 26 December 2015) was a British actor, comedian, and writer who also had a career in academic psychology.

== Career ==
Buffery studied at the University of Hull before undertaking a PhD at University of Cambridge. He got his start in the Cambridge Footlights, but his place in the London Footlights Revue was taken over by Graham Chapman (later of Monty Python) when Buffery chose an academic career over one in entertainment.

I do remember that in one year – probably 1967 – Clive [James] did a two-man show with Tony Buffery... who had been part of the 1963 Footlights show Cambridge Circus which featured John Cleese, Tim Brooke-Taylor, Bill Oddie, and David Hatch, but who as a committed graduate student had not gone with it on its professional tour to the West End and elsewhere. He was – probably still is – an astonishingly funny man not least physically, and I know that Clive always admired him no end.

— Pete Atkin, 03 Sep 2006

As a member of the Footlights, Buffery contributed to the writing, music, and/or performance of many of the troupe's productions in the 1960s, including:

- "This Way Out" (1965–66)
- "My Girl Herbert" (1964–65)
- "Stuff What Dreams are Made Of" (1963–64)
- "A Clump of Plinths" (1962–63)
- "Double Take" (1961–62)

Buffery also appeared in the 1967 Comedy series Twice a Fortnight along with Terry Jones, Michael Palin, Graeme Garden, Bill Oddie, and Jonathan Lynn.

In the late 1960s, Buffery was a fellow of Corpus Christi College, Cambridge. He was a senior research officer at Oxford University between 1970 and 1974, and then held lectureships at the University of London and the University of Melbourne, and in hospitals and units in the United States, through the 1970s and 1980s. His academic work as a neuropsychologist included developing computer programs to assist people's recoveries from strokes and brain injuries.

Buffery married Maria Kowalska in 2006, and the couple moved to Kowalska's homeland of Poland, where Buffery spent some time teaching English. He died in December 2015 at the age of 76.

== Bibliography ==
- Cambridge Circus. EMI. 1993. ISBN 978-0-901401-36-6. (with John Cleese)
