= One Man Band (disambiguation) =

A one-man band is a musician who plays a number of musical instruments simultaneously using their body and various mechanical contraptions.

One Man Band may also refer to:

== Film ==
- The One-Man Band, a 1900 short film by Georges Méliès
- One Man Band (film), a 2005 Pixar short film
- One Man Band (unfinished film), an unfinished short film made by Orson Welles between 1968 and 1971

== Music ==
=== Albums ===
- One Man Band (Ronnie Dyson album), 1973, and the title track "One Man Band (Plays All Alone)"
- One Man Band (James Taylor album), 2007

=== Songs ===
- "One Man Band" (Three Dog Night song), 1970
- "One Man Band" (Roger Daltrey song), 1973, written by Leo Sayer
- "One Man Band" (Old Dominion song), 2019
- "One Man Band", a song on Jack Savoretti's single "Gypsy Love"
- "One Man Band", a song by Status Quo on the album Rock 'til You Drop

== Other uses ==
- A television reporter who works without a support crew, also known as a video journalist
- A self-proclaimed nickname of Heath Slater

== See also ==
- One Man Band Man, a 2007 Swizz Beatz album
