= Hello Cheeky =

British radio programme (1973–1979)

- Running time: 30 minutes
- Country of origin: United Kingdom
- Language: English
- Home station: BBC Radio 2
- TV adaptations: Hello Cheeky (1976)
- Starring: Barry Cryer; John Junkin; Tim Brooke-Taylor
- Produced by: David Hatch; Richard Willcox; Bob Oliver Rogers
- Original release: 7 April 1973 – 11 November 1979
- No. of episodes: 67

Hello Cheeky is a comedy series starring Barry Cryer, John Junkin and Tim Brooke-Taylor, broadcast on BBC Radio 2 between 1973 and 1979, and also broadcast on television - on the ITV network - in 1976. The format was short comedy sketches, often as short as one line, with occasional longer sketches.

The BBC radio show was broadcast weekly in a half-hour timeslot, usually on Saturday or Sunday lunchtime. Its three stars were normally the only performers who appeared, although the show's musical director, Denis King, was often given a small speaking role in one or two of the shorter items.

The radio series featured music by the Denis King Trio (Denis King - piano, brother Tony King - bass; and Don Lawson - drums), and was produced initially by David Hatch, then by Richard Willcox, and thereafter by Bob Oliver Rogers.

== Radio ==
The series ran on BBC Radio 2 from 1973 to 1979. There were also three Christmas specials: Hello Cheeky Hello Christmas in December 1973, Hello Christmas in December 1974, and the pantomime-style Cheeky Whittington and his Magic Ballpoint in 1976. There was also a Summer Special in 1974.

Initially, the scripts were written by all three of the show's stars. Later in the run, as Tim Brooke-Taylor's time became increasingly absorbed by his television work on The Goodies, the scripts were written solely by Barry Cryer and John Junkin.

During the first two series in 1973-74 it was ordinarily produced by David Hatch, but occasional editions were produced by Richard Willcox (with both men credited on the 1974 summer special, Hello Summer) From series 3, in 1975, it was produced by Bob Oliver Rogers (with David Hatch returning briefly to produce some editions of the final series, aired in 1979, due to Bob's unexpected death).

The initial experiment of broadcasting it at lunchtime on Saturdays lasted for one series only. From series 2 it was transmitted at lunchtime on Sundays, a more natural home for comedy shows, which had traditionally occupied that spot in the station's schedules since the heyday of the old BBC Light Programme in the early 1960s.

To describe it as a sketch show, while technically correct, would also be misleading. It was typically more a succession of quick-fire gags and one-liners, rather than actual sketches. So many of the items were one-line, that co-writer Barry Cryer was moved to comment publicly that "a minute was a long sketch on Hello Cheeky". One consequence of this was that the show lacked anything resembling a regular structure.

Some items did reappear each week, but not in any kind of regular order: these included quickfire "meanwhile"s, "would you believe it?"s, "home hints for the handyman", "the Encyclopedia of the Air", comic songs, spoof phone calls (one cast member would pretend to be a listener or celebrity, phoning to complain about the previous item), spoof news flashes, and "Hello Cheeky's personal column" (a spoof advice forum). A number of the items that were used had previously been recorded by Marty Feldman (who John Junkin and Tim Brooke-Taylor had known since working together on television in 1968).

Many of the jokes were topical, featuring references to well-known personalities of the day: not only showbusiness celebrities (everyone from comedian Ken Dodd to actor Roger Moore), but also BBC presenters (including Michael Aspel, Frank Bough, Nicholas Parsons and Terry Wogan), politicians (especially the Prime Minister, Harold Wilson, and the Leader of the Opposition, Mrs Thatcher), sportsmen (such as England international footballer Martin Peters), and prominent personalities of the day (the inevitable references to clean-up-TV campaigner Mary Whitehouse, and the anti-immigration MP, Enoch Powell).

The show gained a reputation for its puns. Two examples: "I once spent an evening with twelve Benedictines". "What happened?" "I drank them all, and fell over"; and "Enoch Powell sent me a draught board for Christmas. Trouble is, all the squares are white."

The final item each week, which was typically the longest item in the show, often featured a comic amalgam of three ostensibly serious broadcasts (e.g. Z-Cars, Gardeners' Question Time and A Book At Bedtime), with one of the cast changing channels on his TV or radio, such that a line from one programme (the feed line) was followed by one from a very different type of programme (the punchline), to get a laugh.

Occasionally, the final sketch was a film spoof. For instance, secret agent Jim Bellybutton appeared in an espionage sketch spoofing the James Bond films. These sketches tended to lampoon famous celebrities of the day. For example: Agent Bellybutton, not so much Roger Moore with the stamina of Martin Peters; more Patrick Moore, with the stamina of Sylvia Peters. A mad scientist has to rebuild him after an accident (spoofing The Six Million Dollar Man TV series): Six Pounds 37 New P? We couldn't even rebuild Ronnie Corbett for that.

In later series the celebrities who were the butt of the jokes were invited onto the show, to be lampooned to their faces. Famous stars of the day who put themselves through this treatment included chat show host Michael Aspel, BBC TV sports presenter Frank Bough, and radio DJ Terry Wogan.

On 6 April 1975, "The Least Worst of Hello Cheeky" was recorded before a live audience in the BBC's Paris Studio in Regent Street, produced by Bob Oliver Rogers. From the two-hour show, 45 minutes of material was released on a vinyl LP, while two 30-minute radio shows containing material from this recording session were broadcast on 25 January and 1 February 1976 as the final editions of the third series.

The Christmas and Summer specials were somewhat atypical. They did not reflect the standard format, and were in the main a collection of unrelated musical items interspersed with occasional jokes; the Christmas shows did not even have a preference for seasonal pieces. Some of the shorter musical items were performed by the show's three stars, but many items solely featured guests. The Specials were also much longer than the standard half-hour of the regular episodes: the Summer Special was one hour, while the Christmas specials varied - the 1973 Christmas show was also one hour, while in 1974 it was 90 minutes. For the third and final seasonal edition, in 1976, in order to achieve a more comedy-focused show - this time allotted only 45 minutes of airtime - Cryer and Junkin wrote a Hello Cheeky pantomime (Cheeky Whittington and his Magic Ballpoint).

After the completion of four successful series for radio, plus the six Specials, a combination of unfortunate events occurred which curtailed what had been a popular and successful show. Firstly, a dispute arose with BBC Management, concerning the cast's decision to defect to ITV, to make a TV version of the show. And then, unexpectedly, the radio show's 29-year-old producer died. Former producer David Hatch was brought in to put together a final half-dozen episodes, from material already in the can, for a truncated final series: which was only transmitted after more than three years had elapsed since the previous series.

In recent years, some of the half-hour episodes from Hello Cheeky have been re-broadcast on digital station BBC Radio 7 and its successor BBC Radio 4 Extra. These have mostly been editions first heard in 1973, although Cheeky Whittington and his Magic Ballpoint also receives seasonal re-runs as an item in the three hour special, Barry Cryer's Christmas Selection Box - Part 2.

With the exception of the two specials recorded on 6 April 1975, all of the radio broadcasts are known to exist (at least as off-air recordings).

== Television ==
In 1976 an unsuccessful attempt was made to present Hello Cheeky on television, with the same writing and performing team. When BBC-TV turned the proposal down, the show aired instead on the ITV network. It was made by Yorkshire Television, with Len Lurcuck as producer, and ex-BBC comedy producer Duncan Wood as its executive producer.

The first series, comprising eight episodes, was broadcast between 19 January and 22 March 1976. A second series, comprising a further five episodes, was broadcast later that year, between 26 May and 23 June: the timing was a deliberate attempt to benefit from the popularity of the radio show, the latest series of which ran throughout that summer.

The TV show was not a ratings success. The reason for this was considered to be the fact that no attempt was made to make the material more visual for television.

The failure of the attempt to transfer the show to television, plus the impact on BBC Management of the cast defecting to ITV (and, in effect, using BBC Radio to promote a TV series on the rival ITV channel), had a disastrous effect on what had, up until then, been a very successful radio show: only a handful of further radio episodes would be made, and their transmission was postponed for several years (until the television show had ceased to air in re-runs on the ITV network).

The two TV series (except for Episode 10, which no longer exists in the archive) were released on DVD by Network in June 2010. The DVD was deleted from their catalogue on 13 January 2013.

== Radio Episodes ==
=== Series 1 ===
- S01 E01 (7 April 1973)
- S01 E02 (14 April 1973)
- S01 E03 (21 April 1973)
- S01 E04 (28 April 1973)
- S01 E05 (5 May 1973)
- S01 E06 (12 May 1973)
- S01 E07 (19 May 1973)
- S01 E08 (26 May 1973)
- S01 E09 (2 June 1973)
- S01 E10 (9 June 1973) (Guest Michael Aspel)
- S01 E11 (16 June 1973)
- S01 Christmas Special, Hello Christmas (25 December 1973)

=== Series 2 ===
- S02 E01 (10 February 1974)
- S02 E02 (17 February 1974)
- S02 E03 (24 February 1974)
- S02 E04 (3 March 1974)
- S02 E05 (10 March 1974)
- S02 E06 (17 March 1974)
- S02 E07 (24 March 1974)
- S02 E08 (31 March 1974)
- S02 E09 (7 April 1974)
- S02 E10 (14 April 1974)
- S02 E11 (21 April 1974)
- S02 E12 (28 April 1974)
- S02 E13 (5 May 1974)
- S02 E14 (12 May 1974) (Guest Aimi MacDonald)
- S02 E15 (19 May 1974)
- S02 Summer Special, Hello Summer (27 May 1974)
- S02 Christmas Special, Hello Christmas (25 December 1974)

=== Series 3 ===
- S03 E01 (9 March 1975)
- S03 E02 (16 March 1975)
- S03 E03 (23 March 1975)
- S03 E04 (30 March 1975)
- S03 E05 (6 April 1975)
- S03 E06 (13 April 1975)
- S03 E07 (20 April 1975)
- S03 E08 (27 April 1975)
- S03 E09 (4 May 1975)
- S03 E10 (11 May 1975)
- S03 E11 (18 May 1975)
- S03 E12 (25 May 1975)
- S03 E13 (1 June 1975) (Guest Joan Bakewell)
- S03 Special - Least Worst of Hello Cheeky, Part 1 (25 Jan 1976)
- S03 Special - Least Worst of Hello Cheeky, Part 2 (1 Feb 1976)

=== Series 4 ===
- S04 E01 (16 May 1976) (Guest Frank Bough)
- S04 E02 (23 May 1976)
- S04 E03 (30 May 1976)
- S04 E04 (6 June 1976)
- S04 E05 (13 June 1976)
- S04 E06 (20 June 1976)
- S04 E07 (27 June 1976)
- S04 E08 (4 July 1976)
- S04 E09 (11 July 1976)
- S04 E10 (18 July 1976)
- S04 E11 (25 July 1976)
- S04 E12 (1 August 1976)
- S04 E13 (8 August 1976)
- S04 E14 (15 August 1976)
- S04 E15 (22 August 1976)
- S04 E16 (29 August 1976)
- S04 Christmas Special (25 Dec 1976) (Guests: Marti Caine, Peggy Mount and David Jacobs)

=== Series 5 ===
- S05 E01 (7 October 1979)
- S05 E02 (14 October 1979)
- S05 E03 (21 October 1979)
- S05 E04 (28 October 1979)
- S05 E05 (4 November 1979) (Guest Terry Wogan)
- S05 E06 (11 November 1979)
