= In God We Trust (1980 film) =

1980 film by Marty Feldman

- VHS cover
- Directed by: Marty Feldman
- Written by: Chris Allen; Marty Feldman
- Produced by: George Shapiro; Howard West
- Starring: Marty Feldman; Peter Boyle; Andy Kaufman; Louise Lasser; Richard Pryor
- Cinematography: Charles Correll
- Edited by: David Blewitt
- Music by: John Morris
- Distributed by: Universal Pictures
- Release date: September 26, 1980
- Running time: 97 minutes
- Country: United States
- Language: English
- Budget: $6-8 million
- Box office: $5.2 million

In God We Trust (stylized as In God We Tru$t; a.k.a. In God We Trust (or Gimme That Prime Time Religion)) is a 1980 American comedy film starring Marty Feldman, Andy Kaufman, Louise Lasser and Peter Boyle. Intended as a biting religious satire, it was also produced, directed and co-written by Feldman, his second directorial outing following The Last Remake of Beau Geste, and his final before his death in 1982.

== Plot ==
A naive monk, Brother Ambrose, is sent by the abbot on a mission to raise $5000 in order to save their monastery from closing. He goes to Hollywood, where he encounters a number of eccentric characters. He is at first robbed and later befriended by con artist Dr. Sebastian Melmoth, and meets a prostitute named Mary who lets him stay at her apartment. Mary grows to care for Ambrose and seduces him while he is taking a cold shower to try to alleviate his lustful thoughts about her. While he is in Hollywood, he visits several churches including a service at the Church of Divine Profit, performed by the televangelist Armageddon T. Thunderbird in which he sees the focus of the sermon being a request for money in exchange for salvation. Ambrose is angered by this message and tries to meet a number of times with Thunderbird, being ejected each time.

Dr. Melmoth and Ambrose travel the city in a modified school bus, in which they hold church services for donations. During one service, the brakes of the bus release and the bus rolls downhill into a river. The passengers escape safely in the river and are shown on the local news being baptized by the pair, which catches Thunderbird's attention. He prays to G. O. D. for guidance and it tells him to work with Ambrose to make more money because Ambrose is an innocent and has a clean image.

Thunderbird has his minions kidnap Ambrose and bring him to his office where he outlines a plan for his own brand of church on wheels. He says he will pay Ambrose the $5000 the monastery needs if he assists him. While they are talking, Thunderbird mentions that G. O. D. audibly talks to him when he prays to him and Ambrose is surprised because he himself has never heard from God in this way. Ambrose agrees to work with Thunderbird and they go across the country from town to town holding services in their own bus.

One day at Thunderbird's headquarters, Ambrose overhears Thunderbird praying to G. O. D. in his private chamber and when he hears G. O. D. speak back to him, he is intrigued. When Thunderbird leaves, he sneaks into the chamber and discovers that G. O. D. (General Organizational Directivatator) is a sophisticated master computer, linked to all of Thunderbird's finances and operations. He talks with G. O. D. and reads the Bible to it, giving it morality and a conscience. G. O. D. decides to give all of Thunderbird's money away and tells Ambrose what to do to accomplish this, which results in bags of money being poured out of the office's window. Thunderbird discovers someone has been interfering with the computer and rushes back to headquarters where he tries to capture Ambrose and destroys the computer. Ambrose grabs the paid monastery mortgage certificate from Thunderbird's office and escapes in a chase through the city.

While Mary and Dr. Melmoth look for Ambrose during his escape, she learns that Melmoth is her father that left her family when she was a child, due to a distinctive tattoo she sees on his leg. They eventually find Ambrose and rescue him from the people chasing him.

Ambrose goes back to the monastery and gives the abbot the mortgage certificate, then leaves and marries Mary, who is pregnant from their single night together. The end titles show Melmoth's bus traveling down the road, saying they "all lived happily hereafter".

== Cast ==
- Marty Feldman as Brother Ambrose
- Peter Boyle as Dr. Sebastian Melmoth
- Andy Kaufman as Armageddon T. Thunderbird
- Louise Lasser as Mary
- Richard Pryor as G.O.D
- Wilfrid Hyde-White as Abbot Thelonious
- Severn Darden as The Priest
- John Koshel as Twin Bodyguard
- Peter Koshel as Twin Bodyguard

The name 'Sebastian Melmoth' was a pseudonym used by Oscar Wilde, and 'Melmoth' was used as both undertakers' names in Feldman's television show Marty (TV series).

== Production ==
Principal photography occurred in Downtown San Diego. This was the second film of a three film agreement between Universal and Feldman, following the moderate success of The Last Remake of Beau Geste. Following the perceived failure of In God We Tru$t, Feldman and Universal mutually agreed to terminate the contract.

== Reception ==
Roger Ebert gave the film 1.5 stars out of 4. Ebert criticizes the film for apparently believing Feldman himself is inherently funny, and for failing to have the necessary material to build on. Peter Ackroyd of The Spectator described the film as "an agreeable, under-stated little comedy which, like all such affairs, runs out of steam before the close".
