= John Morris (composer) =

American composer (1926–2018)

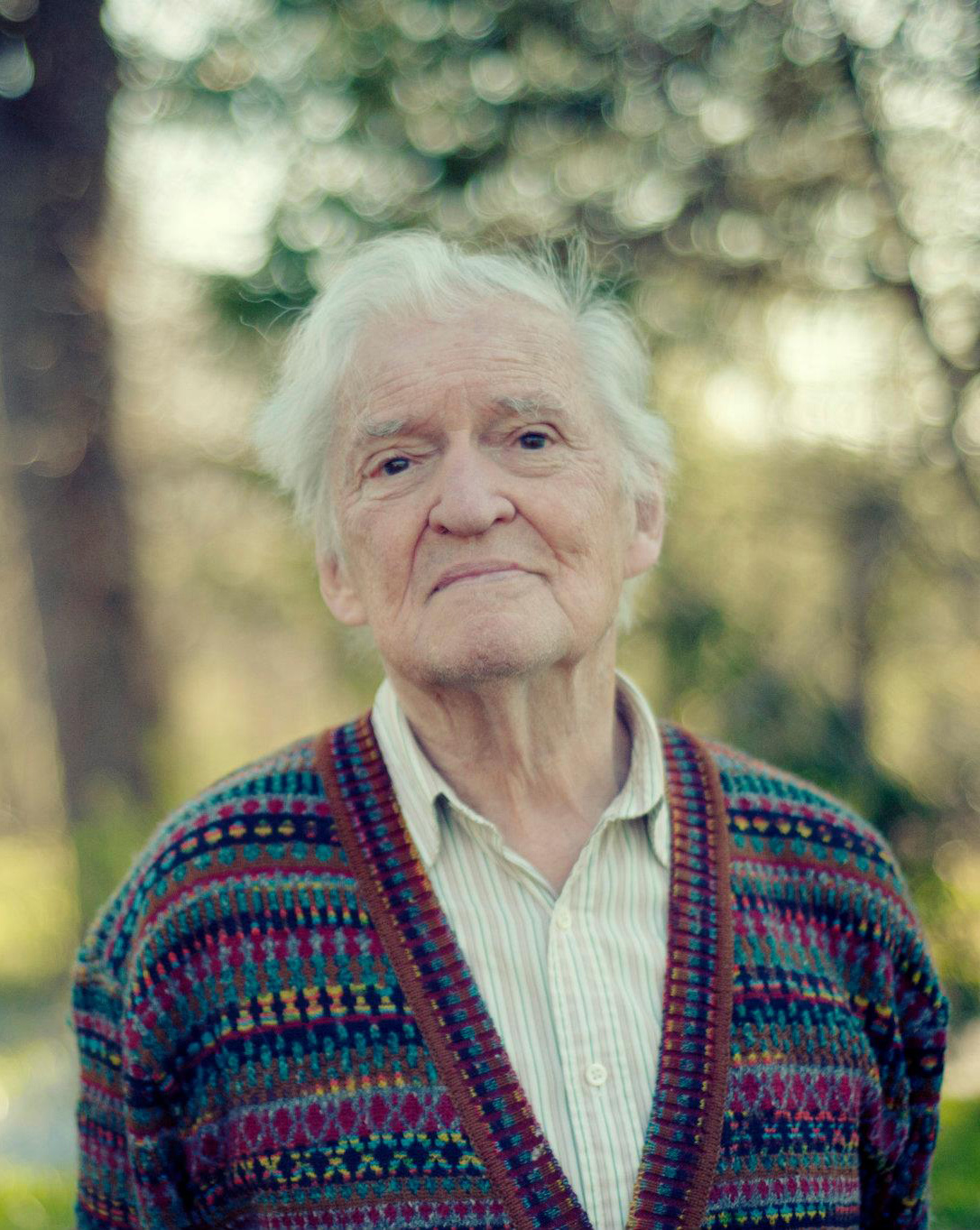
- Morris in 2015
- Born: John Leonard Morris; October 18, 1926; Elizabeth, New Jersey, U.S.
- Died: January 25, 2018 (aged 91); Red Hook, New York, U.S.
- Education: Juilliard School; The New School
- Occupations: Composer; arranger; pianist
- Years active: 1963–2004
- Spouse: Francesca Bosetti (m. 1949)
- Children: 2

John Leonard Morris (October 18, 1926 – January 25, 2018) was an American composer of film, television, and theatrical scores. He often collaborated with filmmakers Mel Brooks and Gene Wilder. He was nominated for an Academy Award for Best Original Score for his work on The Elephant Man (1980), and for Best Original Song for the title song from Blazing Saddles (1974).

== Early life ==
John Morris was born in Elizabeth, New Jersey, to Thomas Morris, an engineer who designed revolving doors for the Tiffany & Co. flagship store in Fifth Avenue, and Helen Sherratt, a homemaker. He became interested in music as early as three years old when he started learning to play the piano and visiting friends in The Bronx with his parents.

His family moved to Independence, Kansas, while he was young, and Morris continued studying piano. By the late 1940s, he moved back to New York City, where he studied at both Juilliard School and at The New School for Social Research.

== Career ==
From the 1950s through the 1970s, Morris helped to compose incidental music and dance numbers for a number of Broadway productions, including Wildcat (1960), Hot Spot (1963), Baker Street (1965), Dear World (1969), Mack & Mabel (1974), and Hamlet (1975). He had written and produced his own musical, A Time for Singing, released in 1966.

=== Mel Brooks ===
Morris had a long working relationship with Mel Brooks, starting with two musicals, Shinbone Alley (1957) and All-American (1962). Their joint film debut was The Producers in 1967. Morris did the original arrangement for Springtime for Hitler and the rest of the film's underscore. Morris would work with Brooks on another eleven of his films, including Blazing Saddles (for which he received a co-writing credit Oscar nomination with Brooks for the film's theme song), Young Frankenstein (for which he scored its famous "Transylvanian Lullaby"), and The Elephant Man (for which he was nominated for a Grammy and an Oscar for its score).

Only two of Brooks' films did not feature Morris' music: Robin Hood: Men in Tights and Dracula: Dead and Loving It were both composed by Hummie Mann. In an interview with Film Score Monthly, Brooks explained that Morris couldn't do the music for Men in Tights or Dead and Loving It due to other commitments.

Morris also helped to score films of actors who had worked with Brooks when they produced their own films. These included Gene Wilder's The Adventure of Sherlock Holmes' Smarter Brother, The World's Greatest Lover, The Woman in Red and Haunted Honeymoon, and Marty Feldman's The Last Remake of Beau Geste and In God We Tru$t.

=== Other work ===
Morris composed the scores for a number of other films and for several television shows, including the themes for The French Chef and Coach. He won a Daytime Emmy for his score for the TV miniseries The Tap Dance Kid.

== Personal life and death ==
He was married to Francesca Bosetti, and had two children: his son Evan, who died in 2014 and daughter Bronwen. Morris died on January 25, 2018, in his Red Hook, New York, home following complications from a respiratory infection at the age of 91. He was survived by his wife, his daughter, five grandchildren, and two great-grandchildren. Brooks said on Morris' death "He was my emotional right arm. Music tells you what to feel and he knew what I wanted you to feel. He composed it and made it happen."

== Filmography ==
- The Blackwater Lightship (2004) (TV)
- The Lady in Question (1999) (TV)
- Murder in a Small Town (1999) (TV)
- Ellen Foster (1997) (TV)
- World War II: When Lions Roared (1994) (TV)
- Scarlett (1994) (TV)
- Life Stinks (1991)
- Stella (1990)
- Coach (composer: main theme) (1989–97)
- Second Sight (1989)
- The Wash (1988)
- Dirty Dancing (1987)
- Ironweed (1987)
- Spaceballs (1987)
- The Little Match Girl (1987)
- Haunted Honeymoon (1986)
- Clue (1985)
- The Doctor and the Devils (1985)
- Johnny Dangerously (1984)
- The Woman in Red (1984)
- To Be or Not to Be (1983)
- Yellowbeard (1983)
- Table for Five (1983)
- History of the World: Part I (1981)
- The Elephant Man (1980, Oscar nomination)
- In God We Tru$t (1980)
- The Scarlet Letter (PBS mini-series 1979/80)
- The In-Laws (1979)
- High Anxiety (1977)
- The World's Greatest Lover (1977)
- The Last Remake of Beau Geste (1977)
- The Adams Chronicles (1976)
- Silent Movie (1976)
- The Adventure of Sherlock Holmes' Smarter Brother (1975)
- Blazing Saddles (1974)
- Young Frankenstein (1974)
- Bank Shot (1974)
- The Twelve Chairs (1970)
- The Gamblers (1970)
- The Producers (1967)
- A Time for Singing (Broadway Musical, 1966)
- The French Chef (second theme) (1963)
