= The Four Sydney Lotterbies =

British comedy sketch

"The Four Sydney Lotterbies" is a British comedy sketch performed on an episode of the 1967-1968 sketch comedy TV series At Last the 1948 Show. The four main actors (the four "Sydney Lotterbies") in the sketch were John Cleese, Marty Feldman, Tim Brooke-Taylor, and Graham Chapman, each of whom had a hand in writing the dialogue. The sketch was named for Cleese's associate, the television producer and director Sydney Lotterby. "The Four Sydney Lotterbies" is one of the relatively few 1948 Show sketches that today survive in video as well as in audio format. The sketch can be seen on the DVD compilation of the series and heard (in a slightly abbreviated form) on its original soundtrack album, which has been released on CD.

== The sketch ==
The action takes place in an outdoor cafe in "sunny Spain." As the sketch begins, Cleese is seen sitting at a table with Brooke-Taylor, who is hidden behind a copy of the London Financial Times. Feldman enters and approaches Cleese, asking if he hasn't seen him somewhere before. Presently, the two men recognize each other as having both been "on the plane on the way over." As neither of them knows the exact time of day, they both try to ask Brooke-Taylor, addressing him in Spanish. He answers in English, "Beg pardon, were you gentlemen addressing me? Oh, goodness me! Weren't you two on the plane on the way over?" By now it is plain that the three men, who are all dressed similarly in shorts and Bermuda shirts, also sound exactly alike. The threesome becomes a foursome when Chapman joins it, speaking too in the same tone of voice.

The humour of the fact that the four men sound alike is increased when Feldman tries to "place" each of the other men "by his accent. Despite the fact that they all have the same accent, Feldman is from Wimbledon, Chapman from Bristol, Cleese from Manchester, and Brooke-Taylor from Edinburgh (though he adds, when Feldman tells him he doesn't "sound like a Scottie," that he has spent most of his life in Cardiff). What is more we find, when the men get around to introducing themselves, that they all have the same name—Sydney Lotterby—and that they all work as "wholesale greengrocers"—all, that is, except for Feldman, who is a barrister but "used to be a wholesale greengrocer." The humor climaxes when Chapman's "little lady" enters, saying "Come, Sydney! We'll be late," and all four men rise at once—then turn to each other and remark, in unison, "Well, there's a coincidence!"
