= The Marty Feldman Comedy Machine =

1971 ITV comedy-variety sketch series

- Genre: Comedy
- Written by: Marty Feldman; Spike Milligan; Barry Levinson; Larry Gelbart; Rudy De Luca; Tim Brooke-Taylor
- Starring: Marty Feldman; Spike Milligan; Hugh Paddick; Bob Todd; Valentine Dyall; Clovissa Newcombe; Frances de la Tour; John Junkin; Rudy De Luca; Barry Levinson
- Composer: Jack Parnell
- Countries of origin: United Kingdom; United States
- Original language: English
- No. of seasons: 1
- No. of episodes: 14

Production
- Producer: Larry Gelbart
- Running time: 60 mins (UK); 30 mins (USA)
- Production companies: ATV; Greg Garrison Productions; Marty Feldman Scripts, Ltd.

Original release
- Network: ITV (ATV Production); ABC TV

The Marty Feldman Comedy Machine is a 1971 comedy-variety sketch series, starring British comedian Marty Feldman.

Co-produced by ATV in the UK and ABC TV in the United States, it was recorded at ATV's Elstree Studios. It features opening and closing credits animated by Terry Gilliam, as well as featuring guest appearances by Spike Milligan, John Junkin and Frances de la Tour. It also featured sketches written by Rudy De Luca, Barry Levinson, and Larry Gelbart.

Long unavailable, the complete series was to be released on DVD in the UK through Network on 6 June 2016. However, the release has been postponed indefinitely when Network went out of business.
