= Derek Scott (music director) =

Background information
- Born: 25 December 1921; Biggleswade, Bedfordshire, England
- Died: 27 May 2006 (aged 84)
- Occupation: Musical director

Derek Thomas Scott (25 December 1921 – 27 May 2006) was a British film, television and stage musical director, film and television composer and musician. He started his career as a double act with both Terry-Thomas and Tony Hancock before becoming a composer for film and television and "one of Britain's best known light entertainment musical directors."

Scott is best known for being the music director for ITV's The Muppet Show (1976–1981), composing many of The Muppet Show songs and being the sound of the piano playing dog Rowlf.

== Early life ==
Scott was born in Biggleswade on 25 December 1921 and educated at Bedford Modern School. He showed precocious musical talent becoming a member of the Royal College of Organists at the age of 15.

During World War II, Scott served in the RAF. As a member of Ralph Reader's Gang Show, he toured Europe and North Africa with a scattering of aspiring comedians including Peter Sellers and Tony Hancock.

== Career ==
After the war, "Scott accompanied the comedian Sid Field in Piccadilly Hayride (Prince of Wales Theatre 1946) and worked as a stooge with Terry-Thomas." Scott was then known "for his poise and deadpan humour", according to his obituary in The Stage.

In July 1948, he formed a short-lived double act with Tony Hancock in a show billed as Hank and Scott which appeared at the Windmill Theatre. Harry Worth and Morecambe and Wise appeared on the same show but the latter were deemed "unfunny" at the time. Hank and Scott made their only TV appearance in New To You (1948). Scott would later compose the music for The Punch and Judy Man, and the music for Hancock, the comedian's series for ATV broadcast in 1963.

Scott directed two Royal Variety Shows and was music director for West End shows such as Kiss Me, Kate, Kismet and Brigadoon. He worked in television for ATV at their Elstree Studios where he was musical associate for light entertainment specials working with such stars as Barbra Streisand, Bob Hope, Rudolph Nureyev, Tom Jones, Benny Hill and Charlie Drake. He composed for television shows including Market in Honey Lane (1967), The Marty Feldman Comedy Machine (1971) and the police drama Hunter's Walk (1973). He also wrote the music for Captain Birdseye commercials.

Scott was a contributor to a television documentary about Tony Hancock, Unknown Hancock in 2005.

== Personal life ==
In 1957, Scott married Gillian Veronica Matheson Bain, known as Sidi, a dancer, the daughter of a Bristol doctor and a dance teacher. They had two daughters, Nikki and Emma. Scott retired in 1982 and lived at Southwold, Suffolk, serving as organist at St Edmund's Church, a continuation of a tradition he had started as a schoolboy. His widow died in November 2018.

== TV and filmography ==
- 1948 New to You (TV; musician & performer with Tony Hancock)
- 1957–1960 Spectacular (TV series; musical associate – 2 episodes)
- 1957 No Road Back (music: "Society Rumba", "Club Society", "Minor Murder" – uncredited)
- 1961 Val Parnell's Sunday Night at the London Palladium (TV series; musical associate – 1 episode)
- 1963 Hancock (ATV series; musical director/composer)
- 1963 The Punch and Judy Man (composer)
- 1966 ITV Play of the Week (TV series; composer – 1 episode)
- 1966 Topo Gigio Comes to Town (TV; composer)
- 1967 ITV Play of the Week (TV series, musical director – 1 episode)
- 1967 Armchair Theatre (TV Series) (TV series, musician – 2 episodes; composer, 1 episode)
- 1967 The Benny Hill Show (TV series; musical associate)
- 1967 Spotlight (TV series, musical associate – 1 episode)
- 1967 Market in Honey Lane
- 1969 ITV Sunday Night Theatre (TV series; music director – 2 episodes, 1969, music supervisor – 1 episode, 1969)
- 1969 The Peapicker in Piccadilly (TV; musical associate)
- 1969-1970 The Worker (TV series; musical director - 5 episodes)
- 1970 Carol Channing's Mad English Tea Party (TV; music associate)
- 1970 The Engelbert Humperdinck Show (TV series; music associate – 16 episodes)
- 1970 It's the Only Way to Go (Short; composer)
- 1970–1973 Crime of Passion (TV series, 32 episodes; composer)
- 1972 The Marty Feldman Comedy Machine (TV, 1 episode; composer)
- 1972 Spyder's Web (TV, 13 episodes; composer)
- 1972–1978 General Hospital (UK TV series; composer – 113 episodes)
- 1973 Hunter's Walk (TV Series; composer)
- 1976–1981 The Muppet Show (TV series; musical associate/composer/conductor)
- 1977 Marti (TV series; music associate – 1 episode)
- 1977 The Tony Hatch Music Show (TV special; music associate)
- 1978 Dawn of the Dead (composer: stock library music – uncredited, writer: "Fugarock", "Zap", Scarey 1", "Scarey 2", (Mall Montage Scene) – uncredited) (from 'Sounds Unusual' by Derek Scott (Music De Wolfe) (1975)
- 1978 Tony Hatch & All Kinds of Music (TV special; music associate)
- 1978 Parables (TV series, 1 episode; composer)
- 1981 Starburst (TV Series)|Starburst (music associate – 1 episode)
- 1990 Songs of Praise (St Edmund's Church, Southwold as Organist and Director of Music)
- 1996 The Muppet CDROM: Muppets Inside (Video Game; musician: Animal's drum solo)
- 2005 Unknown Hancock (TV Movie documentary)
