= The Thirteen Chairs =

1969 film by Nicolas Gessner and Luciano Lucignani

- French theatrical release poster
- Directed by: Nicolas Gessner; Luciano Lucignani
- Screenplay by: Marc Behm; Denis Norden; Nicolas Gessner
- Based on: Dvenadtsat stulyev (The Twelve Chairs) by Ilya Ilf and Yevgeni Petrov
- Produced by: Claude Giroux; Edward J. Pope
- Starring: Sharon Tate; Vittorio Gassman; Orson Welles
- Cinematography: Giuseppe Ruzzolini
- Edited by: Giancarlo Cappelli
- Music by: Stelvio Cipriani; Carlo Rustichelli
- Production companies: CEF; COFCI
- Distributed by: NPF Planfilm
- Release dates: 7 October 1969 (Italy); 8 July 1970 (France)
- Running time: 94 minutes
- Countries: Italy; France
- Languages: English, italian

The Thirteen Chairs (French: 12 + 1; Italian: Una su 13) is a 1969 comedy film directed by Nicolas Gessner and Luciano Lucignani and starring Sharon Tate, Vittorio Gassman and Orson Welles, and featuring Vittorio De Sica, Terry-Thomas, Mylène Demongeot, Grégoire Aslan, Tim Brooke-Taylor and Lionel Jeffries.

The film is based on the 1928 satirical novel The Twelve Chairs by Soviet authors Ilf and Petrov, which has been adapted many times (including a 1970 version directed by Mel Brooks). The plot follows increasingly desperate attempts to obtain valuable gems which were hidden in a set of chairs.

It was Tate's last film before she, her unborn son, and four others were murdered at her home by followers of Charles Manson. The film was released posthumously.

== Plot ==
Mario Beretti is a young Italian-American barber who runs a barber shop in New York City located near a construction site that boasts few customers. His life reaches a turning point when he is notified of the death of his aunt in Lavenham, England, who named him her sole heir.

Mario rushes to England and learns that his inheritance consists of not much; only thirteen antique chairs that have a certain value. He sells them to cover his transportation costs, but soon learns from his Aunt Laura's last message that inside one of the chairs is a fortune in jewels. He tries to buy back the chairs, but is unsuccessful. With the help of lovely American antiques dealer Pat, who works in the antiques shop in front of Aunt Laura's house, where he sold the chairs, he launches a bizarre quest to track down the chairs that takes the duo from London to Paris, then to Rome. Along the way they meet a bunch of equally bizarre characters, including Albert, the driver of a furniture-moving van; a prostitute named Judy; Maurice, the leader of a traveling theater company that stages a poor version of Strange Case of Dr Jekyll and Mr Hyde; and Italian entrepreneur Carlo Di Seta and his vivacious daughter Stefanella.

The bizarre chase ends in Rome, where the chair containing the jewels finds its way into a truck and is collected by nuns who auction it off for charity. With nothing left to do as a result of the failure of his quest, Mario travels back to New York City by ship. Pat sees him off and waves goodbye to him.

The film ends with Mario returning to New York City and his barber shop. His friends at the other (and more lavish) shop join him, as do two construction workers and his last customer, Randomhouse. It is there that Mario makes a strange discovery: shortly before his departure for Europe, he invented a way to make hair regrow miraculously. He laughs ecstatically, even maniacally, over his discovery.

== Cast ==
- Sharon Tate as Pat
- Vittorio Gassman as Mario Beretti
- Orson Welles as Maurice Markau
- Vittorio De Sica as Carlo Di Seta – The Commendatore
- Tim Brooke-Taylor as Jackie
- Terry-Thomas as Albert
- Mylène Demongeot as Judy
- Ottavia Piccolo as Stefanella Di Seta
- Claude Berthy as Francois
- Catana Cayetano as Veronique
- Grégoire Aslan as Psychiatrist
- John Steiner as Stanley Duncan
- William Rushton as Lionel Bennett
- Lionel Jeffries as Randomhouse
- Marzio Margine as Pasqualino
- Alfred Thomas as Mbama
- Antonio Altoviti as Greenwood
- Michele Borelli as Rosy
- Edda Albertini as Lady Teasington
- Cardew Robinson as Car Park Attendant

== Production and release ==
The Thirteen Chairs was filmed from February to May 1969. Orson Welles and Tim Brooke-Taylor had their scenes filmed during a break from shooting Welles' comedic film One Man Band. Brooke-Taylor recalled:

I went to film in Cinecitta and was in the producer's office. Ed Pope was on the phone trying to persuade Orson to do the film. He was running through a list of the cast, big names but Orson was not liking them. Eventually Mr Pope got to my name. Pope had no clue who I was and asked where I might be. I nervously put my hand up and was given the phone with the whisper "Get him to do it." A limo was ordered for me to meet Orson in a café in the Via Veneto. Orson's first words were "This is a load of crap." He was partly right but I kept pointing out the good bits as I desperately wanted him to do it. We agreed to completely re-write his scenes.

"He originally was going to be a magician, but we re-wrote the scene with him as a ham actor doing Dr Jekyll and Mr Hyde. We shot most of it in a cinema in Rome and some in the Players' Theatre in London. They were evening shoots in Rome. Orson would occasionally get annoyed with the director and ask me to take over. He'd usually had a drink or two and I found myself shouting "Get over there you big fat pouf.". He'd stop, glare and then smile and return to doing what I'd asked. He knew he and I were on the same side. It's not a great film, but I thought he was wonderful and terrific to work with."

"When I got back to London we still had some filming to work on his TV project. When I disagreed over something he said, "Just because you've been in a B movie doesn't mean you know everything now." He grinned and said "Sorry, I meant an A movie" remembering he was in it as well. I didn't see him again after that. But I always had the best memories of working with a truly great man.

Because the script called for several semi-nude scenes from Sharon Tate, the director arranged to film those scenes first during the early months of her pregnancy. As filming, and her pregnancy, progressed, the director obscured Tate's stomach with items such as large purses and scarves. This is most apparent in the scene following her ride in the furniture mover's van. Tate's biographer Greg King wrote that Tate was paid a substantial salary at over $100,000, but her performance was in some scenes stiff or stilted, which he attributed to morning sickness and other mild problems related to pregnancy.

The Thirteen Chairs was Tate's final film prior to her August 9, 1969 murder at the hands of Charles Manson's followers; many people said that she had a knack for comedy and they were excited for her next film contract (equal to over $1,000,000 in today's money).

== Home media ==
The film was released through rental only by Force Video in 1986 under the Thirteen Chairs title, and again a year later by Continental Video, under the original 12 + 1 title. On 12 March 2008, the film was released on DVD in Italy by 01 Distribution. This version is in Italian, lacks English subtitles, and does not include an English audio track.
