= David Paradine Productions =

TV company founded by David Frost

David Paradine Productions is a television production company founded by David Frost as 'David Paradine Ltd' in 1966. "Paradine" was Frost's middle name.

== Notable productions ==
- At Last the 1948 Show (1967–68) Rediffusion London
- The Rise and Rise of Michael Rimmer (1970) Warner Bros.-Seven Arts
- Through the Keyhole (1987-2008) Yorkshire Television (although the concept originated during Frost's period with TV-am)

== Productions ==
- Frost on Sketch Shows (2013)
- Frost on Interviews (2012)
- Frost on Satire (2010)
- The Frost Report Is Back (2008)
- Frost Over the World (2006)
- Frost Tonight (2006)
- Inside Elton's World (2005)
- Spitting Image: Down and Out in the White House (1986)
- David Frost Interviews Richard Nixon (1977)
- Crossroads of Civilization: The Story of Iran (1977)
- The Slipper and the Rose (1976)
- Leadbelly (1976)
- David Frost Presents the Guinness Book of World Records (1975)
- Who Killed Lamb? (1974)
- Charley One-Eye (1973)
- Rentadick (1972)
- Futtocks End (1970)
- David Frost Presents: Frankie Howerd (1969)
- David Frost Presents: How to Irritate People (1969)
