= The Last Remake of Beau Geste =

1977 film by Marty Feldman

- Theatrical release poster by Drew Struzan
- Directed by: Marty Feldman
- Screenplay by: Chris Allen; Marty Feldman
- Story by: Sam Bobrick; Marty Feldman
- Based on: Beau Geste by P.C. Wren
- Produced by: William S. Gilmore; George Shapiro; Howard West; Bernie Williams
- Starring: Marty Feldman; Michael York; Ann-Margret; Peter Ustinov; James Earl Jones; Trevor Howard; Henry Gibson; Roy Kinnear; Spike Milligan; Terry-Thomas
- Cinematography: Gerry Fisher
- Edited by: Jim Clark; Arthur Schmidt
- Music by: John Morris
- Distributed by: Universal Pictures
- Release date: July 15, 1977
- Running time: 85 minutes
- Country: United Kingdom
- Language: English
- Budget: $4 million

The Last Remake of Beau Geste is a 1977 British historical comedy film directed by, co-written by and starring Marty Feldman. It is a satire loosely based on the 1924 novel Beau Geste, a frequently filmed story of brothers and their adventures in the French Foreign Legion. The humor is based heavily upon wordplay and absurdity. Feldman plays Digby Geste, the awkward and clumsy "identical twin" brother of Michael York's Beau, the dignified, aristocratic swashbuckler.

It was the feature film directorial debut of Feldman. He subsequently went on to direct In God We Tru$t (1980).

== Plot ==
Spoofing the classic Beau Geste and a number of other desert motion pictures, the film's plotline revolves around the heroic Beau Geste (York) and his "identical twin brother" Digby's (Feldman) misadventures in the French Foreign Legion out in the Sahara, and the disappearance of the family sapphire, sought after by their money-hungry stepmother and the sadistic Sergeant Markov (Ustinov).

== Cast ==
- Marty Feldman as Digby Geste (and uncredited as the Universal Costume Department man during the opening and closing credits)
- Michael York as Beau Geste
- Ann-Margret as Flavia Geste
- Peter Ustinov as the brutal Sergeant Markov
- Sinéad Cusack as sister Isabel Geste
- Trevor Howard as Sir Hector
- Spike Milligan as Crumble the Butler
- Burt Kwouk as Father Shapiro
- James Earl Jones as Arab Chief
- Avery Schreiber as Arab Chieftain / Used Camel Salesman
- Terry-Thomas as Warden
- Henry Gibson as General Pecheur
- Roy Kinnear as Corporal Boldini
- Irene Handl as Miss Wormwood
- Hugh Griffith as Judge
- Stephen Lewis as Henshaw
- Ed McMahon as Arab Horseman
- Michael McConkey as young Digby
- Roland MacLeod as Dr. Crippen
- Martin Snaric as Valentino

== Production ==
=== Development ===
Feldman had appeared in two film spoofs made by actor-writer-directors, Mel Brooks' Young Frankenstein and Gene Wilder's The Adventure of Sherlock Holmes' Smarter Brother. In 1976, Feldman signed with Universal Pictures for a five-picture deal to direct, write, and act in films, beginning with The Last Remake of Beau Geste.

Feldman states in eyE Marty, his posthumously published autobiography, that when he originally suggested a film called The Last Remake of Beau Geste to Universal, he was not only joking but also "thinking of the wrong foreign-legion film. The film I was thinking about was called The Four Feathers."

"We see Marty as a triple threat artist," said a Universal spokesman. "Marty is like a throwback to the old silent comics who could do it all. It doesn't matter that he's British because physical gags travel. That's why he has a major future ahead of him and why we've made a major, major investment in Marty at Universal."

"Everybody has a five picture deal," said Feldman. "Until the first picture bombs. Then they have a no picture deal."

Feldman called it a "broad comic parody". He wrote it during and after the making of Sherlock Holmes.

"There's the whole idea of dying nobly, a bull---- idea. The film will poke fun at the way people think about war, dying for flags instead of people, heroism. There is a serious element in all comedy... the two overlap and merge. I see life as absurd and there's dignity in the absurd. Keaton had it. Chaplin had it. Woody Allen and Lenny Bruce. What we're saying about life is laugh."

"I didn't want to work with clowns but actors who can clown," he said.

=== Shooting ===
Filming began August 30, 1976.

The film was shot on location in Spain, and in Ireland at Ardmore Studios in Bray, and on location at Kilmainham Gaol in Dublin and Adare Manor near Limerick.

Filming was difficult, with the shoot plagued by excessive rain in Madrid. Feldman also fell ill with chicken pox and production was suspended while he went away to recover.

The film went over budget and over schedule.

After completing his cut of the film, Universal sent Feldman on a two-week "working vacation." While he was gone, Universal recut the film and had John Morris compose a new score. Feldman's friend Alan Spencer said the two cuts were markedly different – Feldman's was more surreal and Pythonesque, whereas Universal's told a more conventional story. The Universal version ended with a scene where Feldman's began, because his was told in flashback. Spencer says both versions were tested before audiences, and Feldman's version tested better, but Universal ultimately released their cut of the film.

== Release ==
Feldman was angry with Universal for distributing their recut of the film. Attempts have been made since his death in 1982 to have the director's cut released, but so far have been unsuccessful. According to Michael York, "Marty's version was much funnier." The film was released on DVD in the US on January 11, 2010, as part of the Universal Vault Series of DVD-on-Demand titles, sold by Amazon.com, in the UK, the film was released through Second Sight Films on January 24, 2011.

Kino Lorber released a Blu-ray special edition of The Last Remake of Beau Geste featuring a commentary from Alan Spencer that verbally recreates Feldman's cut.

== Reception ==
On Rotten Tomatoes the film has an approval rating of 50% based on 14 reviews.

=== Domestic reviews ===
Vincent Canby of The New York Times wrote a positive review of the film, describing it as having "a whole range of jokes that are funny primarily because they are in absolutely terrible taste." Gene Siskel of the Chicago Tribune gave the film 2.5 stars out of 4 and called it "only a slightly above-average comedy. It starts out with a number of funny sequences, and Feldman is funny-looking for a few minutes. But I don't find him interesting enough or funny enough or likable enough to carry an entire movie."

In Variety, Arthur D. Murphy wrote that the film "emerges as an often hilarious, if uneven, spoof of Foreign Legion films ... An excellent cast, top to bottom, gets the most out of the stronger scenes, and carries the weaker ones." Penelope Gilliatt of The New Yorker called the film "recklessly funny" and "a hilarious exercise in taste run amok."

Charles Champlin of the Los Angeles Times wrote, "There are too few jokes and rapturous inventions to sustain even the movie's brief 85 minutes, some of those that exist are strained too hard and some should have been dropped after the first draft. It gets to be a long siege at the fort." Gary Arnold of The Washington Post wrote, "Although there's no difference in the games they like to play, Feldman seems a shaky, bush-league terrible joker compared to a prodigal, big-league terrible joker like [Mel] Brooks ... Feldman often seems uncertain about whether a sight gag will pay off, so to reassure himself, he'll run it into the ground."

Rex Reed, in the New York Daily News, called the film "a bogus Foreign Legion farce by alleged comic Marty Feldman, who looks like a boll weevil with glaucoma. Physical repulsiveness is a poor substitute for bankrupted humor." He also said that it "steals, borrows and mostly begs whatever meager laughs it gets from old, discarded Mel Brooks jokes. Rarely have I seen anything labeled "comedy" so desperately on its knees or so hopelessly bereft of humor and originality. Feldman eats paper, falls on his bug-eyed face in the mud, and has the gall to superimpose himself onto film clips of Gary Cooper from William Wellman's original masterpiece Beau Geste. Sometimes the more boring desert battles are interrupted by Ed McMahon doing used-camel commercials. The Last Remake of Beau Geste is vulgar and a disgraceful waste of Universal's money and the talents of Ann-Margret, Peter Ustinov and James Earl Jones. Watching them knock their heads against a blank wall is like watching a parade, in which prancing beauty queens try gracefully to step over whatever the horses have dropped in the streets. It's called The Last Remake of Beau Geste. One hopes it is also the last time Marty Feldman will remake anything. It probably won't be, but I can dream can't I?" Kathleen Carroll, also of the Daily News, said, in a 2½-star review, that "what purports to be a merry sendup of P.S. Wren's desert classic of brave legionnaires is really a third-rate imitation of Brooks' raunchy, reckless film comedies—and done with a very heavy hand, at that. Feldman simply presses too hard and attempts too much."

"Yet the whole movie is good entertainment in the best Feldman, Mel Brooks, Peter Sellers tradition", wrote Michael Ward of The Plain Dealer. "It might bring a smile to face of P.C. Wren himself. It certainly can't seriously offend anyone", he added. R.H. Gardner of The Baltimore Sun said "has the same air of fine madness that pervaded [Feldman's prior successes] with one noticeable difference: it isn't very funny. Exactly why I'm not sure. Certainly, "Beau Geste" and the genre of films it represents cry out for spoofing, and Feldman has contributed some nice touches, including a segment from the one that starred Gary Cooper in the Thirties. Moreover, the cast he has assembled could hardly be improved upon for a farce of this sort. [...] But though they all work hard, Feldman particularly, the results do not justify the effort. I smiled here and there, but I don't think I laughed once." Bruce McCabe of The Boston Globe called it "a surprisingly sturdy little piece of summer wackiness, its slapstick balanced by some wit."

The Oregon Journal's Susan Stanley called the film "a nice place to wallow for an hour and a half. It is, of course, an exercise in patience as you sift through the chaff for the wheat. Here a gem, there a gem. It's foul of mouths, full of sight gags, and rich with references to those old Foreign Legion movies it's affectionately poking fun at. And the silliness is a special and inspired kind." Martin Malina of The Montreal Star wrote that "the trouble with The Last Remake of Beau Geste is that many of these gags are stretched and repeated beyond risibility. The pages blow off the calendar again and again: Ustinov keeps changing peg-legs; Ann-Margret keeps leering at men: and the film keeps cutting to Trevor Howard in bed 'alive and dying' — all subject to the law of diminishing laughs. Still none of this is in more than amiable bad taste. Some of the jokes may be smutty but they're often funny and never offensive." Dave Lanken of the Montreal Gazette called the film "a series of fresh and funny things visual jokes, witty exchanges, zany concepts and silly takeoffs. But somehow they don't coalesce into something whole; the film remains more a comedy catalogue than a comedy feature."

Michele Ross wrote in The Atlanta Constitution that "if you haven't been to a junior high skit in a while, there's no need to wait for school to reopen. You can go see The Last Remake of Beau Geste instead. That's where the level of humor remains in this film. It's reminiscent of a bunch of 12-year-olds who assume anything they think up is funny just because they thought it up. In fact, the 12-year-olds probably would be funnier than Marty Feldman is." Clyde Gilmour of The Toronto Star wrote that "the central notion is still over-extended in this elaborately wacky send-up of ancestral honor, ancient British chivalry, the white man’s burden, brotherly love and a lot of other well-worn cinematic notions. A lot of the jokes misfire damply. Many a promising gag dwindles off too soon instead of building to a climax. At the matinee I attended, there were too many silent gaps between the laughs." Will Jones of The Minneapolis Tribune wrote that "Feldman has put together some sort of 'Beau Geste Meets Hellzapoppin' on the Road to Morocco' whose over-all tone falls closer to juvenile than sophomoric, and dusted with enough scatological crudities to strike an average English vaudeville audience as about par for the evening. For American audiences, it seems to aim for those with a taste for the lowest end of the Mel Brooks spectrum."

Don Morrison of The Minneapolis Star wrote that "there are few things more delightful than British high comedy. And few things more painful than British low humor. The ups and downs between these extremes in 'The Last Remake of Beau Geste' render one rather too dizzy for any sensible critical comment on Marty Feldman's first very own comedy feature. The bug-eyed comic wrote and directed this exhaustive spoof on the romantic English balderdash that has made "Beau Geste" perennial camera fodder. Feldman is nothing if not a low comedian and is hugely popular as such on his native soil. In his American films, as stooge to Gene Wilder and Mel Brooks, his primitive humor has been amusing. It is often very funny in "Last Remake," but a prolonged dose of Marty Feldman as top banana can be more than a little wearing. The anal depths to which his worst jokes can sink affront the imaginative heights of the best -or maybe it is that the low is so low that the rest seems more elevated than it really is. In any case, there is at least as much to laugh at here as there is that which you wish hadn't happened. In the deplorable stretches, one can always relish the crowd of British actors who have good-naturedly joined in the tomfoolery and who walk away with the picture despite a sizable crowd of Americans who can't manage the same aplomb."

=== International reviews ===
David Robinson of The Times wrote that "the somber lesson of the film is that, with Marty Feldman's material, the harder people try the less funny they tend to be. He himself works hardest of all. Peter Ustinov (wooden-legged Legion general), Roy Kinnear (his wooden-headed side-kick) and Spike Milligan (crumbling butler) also try far too much. In the outcome Ann Margret and Michael York, playing it just off straight, come off best, apart from a treasurable scene between Irene Handl as proprietress of a Dotheboys orphanage and Trevor Howard as Sir Hector Geste, seeking to purchase his Beau from her much-soiled stock." A set of paragraphs were written about the film by Patrick Gibbs of The Daily Telegraph, which read as follows:

HAVING ACTED in some of Mel Brooks's "send-ups," Marty Feldman, of the pop eyes and small size, evidently thought he could do it himself. And, by goodness, in The Last Remake of Beau Geste, he shows he can.

But what exactly is this "it?" purists may reasonably ask, After some consideration I pronounce the genre to be a bastard, born of parody and burlesque, and it is much to the credit of Mr Feldman in his roles as director, writer and actor, including leading actor, that the piece never quite falls between them.

This is the result partly of the spanking pace, partly of the sheer self-confidence the film exudes, and certainly much is owed to some very happy comic inventions.

Not the least of these is the basic idea of making Sir Hector Geste (Trevor Howard) childless, and so forced to adopt an heir. This leads him into getting not the one spunky boy he wants (Michael York) but also his twin (Mr. Feldman).

Their adventures in the French Foreign Legion, after that awful business of the missing diamond belonging to Sir Hector's new wife (Ann-Margret), are much as one would expect, given that the sadistic Sgt. Markov is portrayed by Peter Ustinov in Stroheim style, complete with a repertory of artificial legs.

Derek Malcolm of The Guardian quipped: "I'm not at all sure what Buster Keaton would have thought of Marty Feldman's The Last Remake of Beau Geste. But I think Mel Brooks will like it. He ought to, since Feldman's first feature as director is the direct result of his success in America in Young Frankenstein and Silent Movie. And Beau Geste has much the same hit-or-miss tenacity of both those movies. Alexander Walker of the London Evening Standard wrote that "the trouble with The Last Remake of Beau Geste is that while it is packed with hilarious sight gags, they don’t seem connected to the parody that is always promised (but ultimately never delivered) of P.C. Wren’s tale of derring-do among the Foreign Legion of lost men. Marty Feldman's troika role as star producer and director may account for the frenetic tone of a film that often feels as if it to be in three places at once."

Arthur Steele of the Birmingham Evening Mail called it "just the kind of film I’d imagined Marty Feldman would produce if someone let him make one of his own. Unfortunately for this critic, someone has. And here it is. He wrote it, directs it, and stars in it. A wild farrago of mixed parodies, it takes the stuffing out of every corn-bred celluloid cliche from Dickens’s poverty-ridden melodrama and the flickering silent sheikdom of Valentino to the sand-sagas of the Foreign Legion. There are compensations. Some of the ideas are good. But there are not enough of them for 85 minutes."

In the Manchester Evening News, Keith Macdonald wrote that "even the keenest fans of the chameleon-eyed Marty Feldman would admit he's been wide of the mark in some of his screen exploits, but here he has learned to curb his wilder fancies and the result is probably his best screen comedy yet. Could it be the films he has made with Mel Brooks—Young Frankenstein and Silent Movie—that have taught him discipline? Not that the oft-used label 'self Indulgent' isn't called for from time to time; some sequences are achingly unfunny. But as Marty wrote the story, wrote the screenplay, directed it, and starred in it that's hardly surprising. But there's a rich vein of inventiveness and some of the visual gags are hilarious."

Tom Milne of The Monthly Film Bulletin declared it "a ragbag of a film which looks like nothing so much as a Monty Python extravaganza in which inspiration has run dry and the comic timing gone sadly awry." Colin Bennett of The Age said that "for nearly half its duration the skitting makes a beau jest—visually inventive, at its best hilarious—before it runs low on inspiration and lowers its sights to speeded-up Feldman TV slapstick in the Sahara." Romola Costantino of The Sun-Herald called it a "modified goon-show which is filled with lots of visual gags, some of them funny and some labored. The general effect, however, is comic with never a sane moment."

=== Aftermath ===
The film was described as a "surprise hit" and Feldman was able to direct a second film for Universal, In God We Tru$t, released in 1980.
