= Hancock (1963 TV series) =

1963 British TV sitcom

- Genre: Sitcom
- Written by: Godfrey Harrison; Terry Nation; Dennis Spooner; Richard Harris
- Directed by: Alan Tarrant
- Starring: Tony Hancock
- Composer: Derek Scott
- Country of origin: United Kingdom
- Original language: English
- No. of series: 1
- No. of episodes: 13

Production
- Producers: Alan Tarrant; Tony Hancock
- Running time: 24 minutes
- Production companies: MacConkey Productions; ATV

Original release
- Network: ITV
- Release: 3 January – 28 March 1963

Hancock is a British comedy television series that aired on ITV in 1963. It starred Tony Hancock as a pompous, self-regarding figure similar to the character he had played on Hancock's Half Hour for the BBC, but with different scriptwriters.

== Cast ==
As in his final BBC series, Hancock was the only regular performer in the show. Actors who appeared in individual episodes of the series included Dennis Price, Derek Nimmo, Francis Matthews, John Le Mesurier, Brian Wilde, Pauline Yates, James Villiers, Denholm Elliott, Kenneth Griffith, Geoffrey Keen, Billy Milton, Joan Benham, Peter Vaughan, Allan Cuthbertson, Wilfrid Lawson, Patrick Cargill, Patsy Smart, Adrienne Posta, Diane Clare, Michael Aldridge, Anthony Dawes, Olaf Pooley, Reginald Beckwith, Donald Hewlett and John Junkin.

== Episodes and release ==
- "The Assistant" (3 January 1963)
- "The Eye-Witness" (10 January 1963)
- "Shooting Star" (17 January 1963)
- "The Girl" (24 January 1963)
- "The Man on the Corner" (31 January 1963)
- "The Memory Test" (7 February 1963)
- "The Early Call" (14 February 1963)
- "The Craftsmen" (21 February 1963)
- "The Night Out" (28 February 1963)
- "The Politician" (7 March 1963)
- "The Reporter" (14 March 1963)
- "The Writer" (21 March 1963)
- "The Escort" (28 March 1963)

The series was not reviewed favourably at the time and has never been repeated on ITV.

Six of the episodes were eventually leaked onto the internet. These were The Assistant, The Craftsman, The Man on the Corner, Shooting Star, The Night Out and The Writer. However, the remaining seven were unseen until Hancock’s great niece, Lucy Hancock, inherited the archive following the death of Hancock’s brother Roger. Roger Hancock, who acted as his brother’s agent in the last years of Hancock’s life, had been said to be reluctant to allow the episodes to be screened due to the varied quality of the star’s performances.

In 2022, all thirteen episodes were released by the archive television company Kaleidoscope on their Kaleidoscope Home Media DVD label as "Hancock The Complete ATV Series".

In 2024, the first eleven episodes were broadcast on Rewind TV on Freeview channel 95.

== Bibliography ==
- Vahimagi, Tise . British Television: An Illustrated Guide. Oxford University Press, 1996.
