= Penny Dwyer =

British comedy writer and performer

- Born: Penny Rosemary Dwyer; 24 September 1953
- Died: 4 September 2003 (aged 49); Somerset, UK
- Occupations: Actor, metallurgist

Penelope Dwyer (24 September 1953 – 4 September 2003) was a British comedy writer. She was a member of the Cambridge Footlights revue The Cellar Tapes which won the inaugural Perrier Comedy Awards in 1981. The other performers in The Cellar Tapes were Stephen Fry, Hugh Laurie, Emma Thompson, Tony Slattery and Paul Shearer.

== Career ==
Educated at the University of Cambridge, Dwyer worked as a writer and performer in Cambridge throughout the late 1970s and early 1980s. However, unlike her fellow Perrier winners, she chose not to pursue a full-time career in the entertainment business. Instead, after becoming a metallurgist, Dwyer worked on the construction of the Channel Tunnel.

== Death ==
Dwyer died in Somerset in 2003, aged 49, following a long illness.
