= Cleese =

Cleese is a surname from Britain; an English surname, and a Scottish surname originating from MacCleese/McCleese.

== People ==
People with this name include:

- Alyce Cleese (born 1944), U.S. psychotherapist
- Cynthia Cleese (born 1971), UK actress
- John Cleese (born 1939), UK comedian, member of Monty Python's Flying Circus, whose family name originated as "Cheese"

== Other ==
Cleese may also refer to:

- Mount Cleese, the rubbish tip in Palmerston North, North Island, New Zealand

== See also ==
- McCleese
- Leese (disambiguation)
