= Cambridge Footlights Revue =

Annual comedy revue at the University of Cambridge, England

The Cambridge Footlights Revue is an annual revue by the Footlights Club, a group of comedy writer-performers at the University of Cambridge. Three of the more notable revues are detailed below.

== 1963 revue ==
=== "A Clump of Plinths" — "Cambridge Circus" ===
The 1963 revue, entitled "A Clump of Plinths" (later retitled Cambridge Circus), played at the Edinburgh Festival Fringe in 1963 before opening at West End in London on 10 July 1963. Unfortunately, the revised title sometimes confused audiences, as it was not actually playing at Cambridge Circus itself. "Cambridge Circus" then toured New Zealand in July and August 1964, where they recorded a television special and four radio shows. which were eventually broadcast in November and December 1964. The radio shows were rediscovered in the New Zealand national sound and film archives in 2015 and broadcast again in January 2016 under the title "Goodie, Goodie! Python, Python! The Cambridge Circus Tapes" The New Zealand tour was also notable for the one-hour Cambridge Circus special made for New Zealand television, screened in November and December 1964. It was the first on-screen performance by most of the cast.

Following their successful New Zealand tour, "Cambridge Circus" transferred to Broadway in September 1964 and finally Off-Broadway. The revue was broadcast on television in the United States when the cast made an appearance on The Ed Sullivan Show during October 1964, featuring some of the sketches.

The show was written by, and starred, Tim Brooke-Taylor, Graham Chapman, John Cleese, David Hatch, Bill Oddie, Chris Stuart-Clark and Jo Kendall. Also in the original cast was Tony Buffery, who later became an experimental psychologist. As well as writing and acting in the revue, Bill Oddie also wrote the music for the revue, and an album of sketches and songs, produced by George Martin, was released by Parlophone in 1963. Graham Chapman took over from Tony Buffery when he left the revue to pursue an academic career. Likewise, Jonathan Lynn took over from Chris Stuart-Clark when Stuart-Clark left to become a schoolteacher.

This revue is a notable part of British television history because it includes early appearances by John Cleese and Graham Chapman (later members of Monty Python), as well as Tim Brooke-Taylor and Bill Oddie (later members of The Goodies), and Jonathan Lynn (later one of the co-writers of Yes Minister, and Yes, Prime Minister). One of the comedians became the head of ITV Comedy and another became the head of BBC Radio. Jo Kendall spoke the very first line in Emmerdale. A decade or so later, Cambridge Circus's piano player Dee Palmer joined the band Jethro Tull.

==== Sketches ====
Sketches in the revue included;

- Swap a Jest (written by Tim Brooke-Taylor, Bill Oddie, and Chris Stuart-Clark) – with Tim Brooke-Taylor and Chris Stuart-Clark (later with Jonathan Lynn in place of Stuart-Clark) as Elizabethan entertainers.
- Cloak and Dagger sketch – with John Cleese.
- Custard Pie sketch – with Bill Oddie, Tim Brooke-Taylor and Jonathan Lynn demonstrating the throwing of custard pies. David Hatch narrated the sketch.
- Judge Not (written by John Cleese) – with John Cleese (as the prosecuting counsel), David Hatch (as the judge), Tim Brooke-Taylor (as Percy Molar company director of no fixed abode and music-hall comedian), Tony Buffery (as Arnold Fitch the defendant), and Bill Oddie (as Sidney Bottle – the plaintiff). (Tim Brooke-Tayor and Bill Oddie also appeared in the sketch as ushers).

A radio version of the revue was broadcast by the BBC on 30 December 1963. Originally intended as a one-off special, this went on to become a successful and long-running radio series called I'm Sorry, I'll Read That Again, which premiered in April 1964.

The Cambridge Revue recorded four studio radio shows during their New Zealand tour for Radio New Zealand in August 1964 (broadcast November 1964).

== 1981 revue ==
=== "The Cellar Tapes" ===
The 1981 revue, entitled "The Cellar Tapes", was broadcast on television in 1982. The revue won the first-ever Perrier Award at the 1981 Edinburgh Festival Fringe. It is a notable part of British television history because it includes early appearances by Hugh Laurie (President of Footlights), Stephen Fry, and Emma Thompson (Vice President of Footlights), all of whom went on to greater fame in the film and television industry.

It was written by Hugh Laurie and Stephen Fry with Penny Dwyer, Kim Harris, Katie Kelly, Jan Ravens, Paul Shearer, Tony Slattery, and Emma Thompson and performed by Laurie, Fry, Dwyer, Shearer, Slattery, and Thompson. Additional material was provided by Anthony Berendt, Greg Brenman, David Tyler (as Dave Meek), Neil Mullarkey, Greg Snow, Nick Symons and Sandi Toksvig. The music is written by Steven Edis with Hugh Laurie and Tony Slattery (the exception being the music in the Dracula monologue which is Francis Poulenc's Concerto for Organ, Strings and Timpani in G minor). The director was Jan Ravens.

==== Sketches and songs ====
The order of sketches and songs featured in the revue is as follows.

- A melodramatic opening credit sequence featuring all of the cast members running through the woods in slow motion in a manner reminiscent of the film Chariots of Fire.
- Two short blackout-type sketches, the first with a lone radio announcer (Hugh Laurie) cryptically asking, "Is there anybody there?... Is there anybody there?...," then, "This is Radio 3, is there anybody there?" and the second set at a disco where an apparently enthusiastic dancer (Tony Slattery) lures a girl (Penny Dwyer) onto the dance floor in order to steal her chair.
- A sketch about a Shakespeare masterclass ("an actor prepares"), where a teacher (Stephen Fry) with delusions of grandeur gives pretentious, nonsensical acting advice to his eager student (Laurie).
- A sketch about a chess tournament, with an experienced Russian champion (Paul Shearer) beaten by a clueless beginner (Slattery) who chooses moves that constitute a brilliant strategy despite not knowing the names of the pieces or the rules of the game.
- A monologue about Dracula read by Fry, consisting largely of puns and wordplay. ("Tell me, what blood type are you?" "A?" "I said, what blood type are you?" "O!" I said. "B." "Of all the hideously twisted spectacles I have ever beheld, the pair perched on this man's nose ...)
- A sketch with Slattery and Laurie as two privileged would-be revolutionaries, featuring their performance of the song "If You Can't Smoke It, Kick It to Death," which has the refrain, "They hate you/Everybody hates you/You better look out behind you to see them stabbing you between the eyes".
- A sketch with Emma Thompson as Juliana Talent, a West End actress accepting an award in the most obnoxious, falsely modest manner possible. ("At this point I'd like to say a very warm 'hello and good luck' to Glenda, who's taking over for me tonight... brave, brave lady...") Shearer plays the presenter who gives her the award.
- Another blackout depicting "today in Parliament," which consists of an exterior shot of the building, the voice of Fry calling for order over sounds of unrest, and the voice of Laurie demanding to know why there is "only one monopolies commission."
- A sketch with Fry, Laurie, Slattery and Dwyer, set after dinner in the living room of a couple hosting a father and son. Themes include marital tensions, sexism, and the father's displeasure with his son's acting aspirations and implied homosexuality. The characters also play a game of charades that quickly deteriorates into shouting and name-calling due to Fry's character's ineptitude.
- Slattery singing the song "I'm Going to Shoot Somebody Famous", referencing the shocking assassination of the late John Lennon (which took place only a few months before it was written). This song, with its haunting text and its ominous performance, is the only non-comedic segment of the revue.
- A last blackout, with Laurie babbling gibberish sounds in the style of someone emphatically arguing a point, and Fry firmly telling him, "Now that's a lot of nonsense, and you know it."
- A sketch with Thompson as a bedridden Elizabeth Barrett and Fry as Robert Browning coming to visit her. In ridiculous, affected accents, they have a classically romantic conversation that ends with Browning finally enticing Barrett out of bed (in spite of her feeling "so desperately weak") by promising to "whip [her] senseless."
- A choral performance featuring all of the cast members, led by Thompson and Dwyer. The song is a satirical exhortation to join the British Movement, full of racist and militaristic imagery. The final stanza describes the party's goal:

Imagine a society with skinheads roaming wild and free
And not a pair of thick lips in sight!
Fumigate the Underground and sterilize the cricket ground,
White hope and white elephant, white wash and white Christmas,
White horse and white rich and white poor,
White dirt and white licorice, white helmets, white truncheons,
White face and white Willie Whitelaw!

== Home media ==
This film is included as a special feature on the DVD of Series 2 of A Bit of Fry and Laurie.

== 2012 revue ==
=== "Perfect Strangers" ===
In 2012, the Cambridge Footlights celebrated 50 years at the Edinburgh Festival Fringe. The 2012 show "Perfect Strangers" had a cast of five made up of outgoing president Phil Wang (Chortle Student Comedian of the Year 2010 and Comedy Central Funniest Student 2011), Pierre Novellie, Jason Forbes, George Potts and Emma Powell.

== Footlights revues ==
Information about the Footlights Club and its revues can be accessed through the Cambridge Footlights official website The History of Footlights.
