= One Man Band (unfinished film) =

One Man Band a.k.a. London a.k.a. Swinging London a.k.a. Orson's Bag
- Directed by: Orson Welles
- Written by: Orson Welles
- Starring: Orson Welles; Tim Brooke-Taylor; Charles Gray; Jonathan Lynn; Oja Kodar
- Cinematography: Gary Graver; Tomislav Pinter; Ivica Rajkovic; Giorgio Tonti
- Running time: 29 min
- Country: United States

One Man Band, also known as London and Swinging London, is an unfinished short film made by Orson Welles between 1968 and 1971. The film started life as a part of a 90-minute TV special for CBS, entitled Orson's Bag, consisting of Welles' 40-minute condensation of The Merchant of Venice, and assorted sketches around Europe. This was abandoned in 1969 when CBS withdrew its funding over Welles' long-running disputes with US authorities regarding his tax status, and Welles continued to fashion the footage in his own style.

The film features contributions from British comedians Tim Brooke-Taylor, Graeme Garden, and Bill Oddie, before the trio became known as The Goodies.

== Segments ==
The film consists of five segments, all of them comic: Churchill, Swinging London, Four Clubmen, Stately Homes and Tailors.

=== 1. Churchill ===
The first segment is filmed entirely in silhouette. Welles plays Winston Churchill fielding press questions and then exchanging bons mots with Nancy Astor (Oja Kodar). Each line spoken by Churchill is a well-known witticism commonly attributed to him. Graeme Garden provides narration.

=== 2. Swinging London ===
The longest segment of the film (9 mins) has a bowler-hatted reporter (Tim Brooke-Taylor) wandering through "Swinging London", searching for Carnaby Street with limited success. Most of the supporting roles are played by Welles in a variety of disguises: a British policeman, an old lady selling "dirty postcards", a Chinaman luring customers into a strip club, and the omnipresent one-man band. The song "One Man Band" was written by Bill Oddie (who had joined Brooke-Taylor and Garden for the second season of the TV sketch series Broaden Your Mind). Garden appears briefly as a rude workman and as a Morris dancer. This segment is noteworthy for what reviewers have called its "Pythonesque" style - which is significant as it was filmed before Monty Python's Flying Circus first aired in October 1969.

=== 3. Four Clubmen ===
Apart from Welles' introduction, the soundtrack has been lost for this segment, though the script still exists. It is set in a London club in which Welles plays four different members, all under heavy make-up, plus a noisy waiter who drops things.

=== 4. Stately Homes, a.k.a. Lord Plumfield versus Welles ===
This segment features Welles as a journalist wandering around the stately home of Lord Plumfield. Welles also plays the eccentric, penniless Plumfield; Tim Brooke-Taylor has a cameo as Plumfield's moronic son; and Graeme Garden plays Plumfield's feeble butler, Blemish, who does chicken impressions. (Plumfield says, "I'd give him the sack except we need the eggs.") Garden also provides some narration.

=== 5. Tailors ===
Welles plays a shy American tourist being measured by two rude English tailors (Charles Gray and Jonathan Lynn) who are dismissive of his ignorance of tailoring, and keep mocking his weight.

== Production ==
In 1969, Orson Welles was in London and got in touch with writer/performers Tim Brooke-Taylor and Graeme Garden. Brooke-Taylor recalled,

Graeme Garden and I made two series of a sketch show called Broaden Your Mind in 1968 and '69. We were watching the first programme of the second series in Graeme's flat. As it ended Graeme's phone rang. He answered it, said a few words, put the phone down and said: "That was Orson Welles." I remember saying "What a coincidence, I was expecting a call from the Pope." It was Orson. He'd seen some of the first series and got our phone numbers. We saw him the next day and agreed to write and shoot some stuff with him.

The collaboration between Welles and Brooke-Taylor led to both men appearing in the Italian comedy The Thirteen Chairs (a.k.a. 12 + 1).

Of the "Lord Plumfield" sketch, Garden recalled,

Orson did my make up – it was pretty heavy handed! ...To grey up my hair I suggested Meltonian white tennis shoe fluid, which he used. It looked OK but flaked off over my shoulders spectacularly. He was in very jolly form. En route to the location we stopped off at the Dorchester for breakfast. Orson had steak and chips. I went to the loo when we arrived, and came back to the crowded dining room looking for our table. Orson yelled across the room "Graeme Garden, stop cruising!""

The bulk of filming was completed in 1968-9, although assorted linking narrations and inserts were filmed by Welles in 1971. The 1971 sequences are noticeable because Welles had grown a long beard by then, whereas he was clean-shaven in all the parts he played in 1968-9. The film was left unfinished in Welles' lifetime.

After Welles' death in 1985, all of his unfinished films were bequeathed to his long-term companion and mistress Oja Kodar, and she in turn donated many of them (including One Man Band) to the Munich Film Museum for preservation and restoration. In 1999 the Munich Film Museum then edited together the complete footage into a 29-minute cut, which has subsequently been screened at numerous film festivals.

The full restored footage has never been released on video or DVD, although an unrestored print is used in Vassili Slovic's 1995 documentary Orson Welles: the One Man Band, which includes the segments Churchill, Stately Homes and Tailors in their entirety, as well as clips from Four Clubmen and One Man Band. The documentary is included on the 2005 Criterion DVD of Welles' later mockumentary, F for Fake.

The non-London sketch segments of Orson's Bag were edited by the Munich Film Museum into the 9 minute short Vienna.

== Cast ==
- Orson Welles as Presenter / Winston Churchill / One-man band / Policeman / Morris dancer / Old lady / Chinaman / Four clubmen / Journalist / Lord Plumfield / American tourist
- Tim Brooke-Taylor as Reporter / Young aristocrat
- Graeme Garden as "Churchill" narrator / Butler / Morris Dancer
- Charles Gray as Tailor
- Jonathan Lynn as Tailor's Assistant / Waiter
- Oja Kodar as Nancy Astor

== See also ==
- List of American films of 1971
