= John Junkin =

British comedy writer and performer (1930–2006)

- Junkin in 1975
- Born: 29 January 1930; Ealing, Middlesex, England
- Died: 7 March 2006 (aged 76); Aylesbury, Buckinghamshire, England
- Occupations: Actor, scriptwriter
- Years active: 1955–2004
- Spouse: Jenny Claybourn (m. 1977; sep. 1992)
- Children: 1

John Francis Junkin (29 January 1930 – 7 March 2006) was an English actor and scriptwriter who had a long career in radio, television and film, specialising in comedy.

== Early life ==
Born in Ealing, Middlesex, the son of a policeman, Junkin and his parents subsequently moved to Forest Gate so that he could attend St Bonaventure's Catholic School there, before qualifying as a teacher at St Mary's College, Strawberry Hill. He worked as a primary school teacher in the East End for three years.

== Career ==
Before leaving his teaching job he began submitting jokes and comedy sketches for radio. He joined Associated London Scripts as a writer in the mid-1950s, and worked with Terry Nation to write for the television shows The Idiot Weekly, Price 2d and A Show Called Fred, featuring Spike Milligan and Peter Sellers. With Nation, Junkin also wrote for comedians Ted Ray, Jimmy Logan, and others.

In 1960, at the suggestion of Harry H. Corbett, he joined Joan Littlewood's Stratford East Theatre Workshop, where he played the lead in the original theatre production of Sparrers Can't Sing. A few years later, he joined the Royal Court Theatre company, and appeared with Rex Harrison in the play August for the People by Nigel Dennis.

Though best remembered for his comedy roles, Junkin played a diverse range of roles on the small screen. He appeared in television dramas such as Z Cars and Dr. Finlay's Casebook, and played Shake, the assistant to Norman Rossington, in the Beatles' 1964 film A Hard Day's Night. Also in 1964, he recorded a number of radio programmes on land for the fledgling ship-based pirate radio station Radio Caroline. His announcements did not include any topical references, and the music was played in by studio engineers. Junkin also has an entry in the Guinness Book of Records as the voice of Mr Shifter, one of the chimps in the PG Tips tea advertisement, the longest-running series of commercials on television.

In comedy roles, Junkin was rarely short of work, on account of his ability to play the stony-faced symbol of low level, petty-minded and unquestioning authority, whether the army sergeant, police constable or site foreman. Through the 1960s and 1970s, he continued to write for comedy performers including Tony Hancock, Marty Feldman, and Morecambe and Wise, as well as appearing on television and in films with such performers as Benny Hill, Peter Sellers, Tommy Cooper, Eric Sykes, and Frankie Howerd. He was the foil to Tony Hancock in some of Hancock's last work for British television, and regularly featured in Feldman's 1968 sketch show Marty, and in The Goodies. With Barry Cryer, Junkin wrote for Morecambe and Wise from 1978 to 1983, in addition to two Christmas specials in 1972 and 1976.

One of his rare leading roles was in the BBC series The Rough with the Smooth, in which he and Tim Brooke-Taylor played comedy writers (with both actors contributing scripts to the series as well). He also hosted his own afternoon television series in the mid-1970s. Titled simply Junkin, it was produced by Southern Television for the ITV network. On radio, he featured with Tim Brooke-Taylor and Barry Cryer in Hello Cheeky, and later when it was developed for television. He also featured in the sex comedy films Confessions from a Holiday Camp (1977) and Rosie Dixon – Night Nurse (1978).

His work tailed off in the 1980s, though he continued to write scripts and make occasional appearances in supporting roles to comedians including Kenny Everett, Joe Pasquale, and Rowan Atkinson. One of his final appearances was in EastEnders in 2002.

== Personal life and death ==
Junkin lived in Wendover, Buckinghamshire. He married public relations executive Jenny Claybourn in 1977 and they had a daughter. Junkin and his wife separated in 1992. He died from lung cancer on 7 March 2006 in the Florence Nightingale House, Aylesbury, several miles from his home. A heavy smoker, he had also been suffering from emphysema and asthma. His life and work were honoured at the British Academy Television Awards in 2006.

== Acting credits ==
=== Film ===
- Doctor in Love (1960) – Policeman (uncredited)
- The Dock Brief (1962) – Dock brief barrister (uncredited)
- The Primitives (1962) – Arthur
- The Brain (1962) – Frederick (uncredited)
- The Wrong Arm of the Law (1963) – Maurice (uncredited)
- Sparrows Can't Sing (1963) – Bridge Operator (uncredited)
- Heavens Above! (1963) – Reporter at Space Launch Site (uncredited)
- The Break (1963) – Harry
- Hot Enough for June (1964) – Clerk in Opening Scene
- The Pumpkin Eater (1964) – Undertaker
- A Hard Day's Night (1964) – Shake
- Doctor in Clover (1966) – Prison Warder (uncredited)
- The Wrong Box (1966) – First Engine Driver
- Kaleidoscope (1966) – Dominion Porter
- The Sandwich Man (1966) – Chauffeur
- How I Won the War (1967) – Large Child
- The Plank (1967) – One Eyed Truck Driver
- Simon, Simon (1970) – 2nd Workman – Driver
- Confessions of a Driving Instructor (1976) – Luigi
- Confessions from a Holiday Camp (1977) – Whitemonk
- Rosie Dixon – Night Nurse (1978) – Mr. Dixon
- Wombling Free (1978) – County Surveyor
- Brass Target (1978) – Carberry
- That Summer! (1979) – Mr. Swales
- Licensed to Love and Kill (1979) – Helicopter Mechanic
- A Handful of Dust (1988) – Blenkinsop
- Chicago Joe and the Showgirl (1990) – George Heath
- Girl from Rio (2001) – Mr. Bigelow
- The Football Factory (2004) – Albert Moss (final film role)

=== Radio ===
- Floggit's
- Radio Caroline (first voice of the test transmissions in March 1964)
- Hello, Cheeky! with Tim Brooke-Taylor and Barry Cryer
- Just a Minute as an occasional guest
- I'm Sorry I Haven't A Clue
- Junkin's Jokers

Television

- The Benny Hill Show (1961)
- Winning Widows (1962, 1 episode)
- Dr. Finlay's Casebook Series 1 episode 6: "Cough Mixture", 1962 – Dougal Todd
- Hancock (1963, 1 episode) – Jerry Spring
- The Plane Makers, (1963) – Dusty Miller
- Z-Cars: "Caught by the Ears" (1963) – Jim Hill
- The Avengers (1963–1967) – Sergeant / Sheriff
- The Blackpool Show (1966 series with Tony Hancock) – Himself
- Watch the Birdies (1966) – Kendall
- Further Adventures of Lucky Jim (1967) –
- Sam and Janet (1967) ITV, Two series of sitcom with Joan Sims (1) and Vivienne Martin (2)
- Marty, comedy television series with Marty Feldman, Tim Brooke-Taylor and Roland MacLeod (1968–69) – various characters
- Catweazle: "The Flying Broom-sticks" (1969) – Police Sergeant
- The Goodies (1972) – Police Sergeant
- The Shadow of the Tower (1972) – Master John
- Looking for Clancy (1975) – Jim Clancy
- Lord Peter Wimsey: "Five Red Herrings" (1975) – Mr. Alcock
- Out (1978) – Ralph Veneker
- The Sweeney (1978) – Taxi Yard Proprietor
- Only When I Laugh (1979) – Landlord
- The Ravelled Thread (1979) - Dobbs
- Coronation Street (1981) – Bill Fielding (a short-lived boyfriend of Elsie Tanner)
- Odd One Out (1982) – Himself – Voiceover (voice)
- The Professionals (1983) – Hollis
- Blott on the Landscape (1985) – Waiter
- Crosswits (1985, quiz panelist)
- Ask No Questions (1986)
- Mr. Bean (1990) – The Maitre D'
- Inspector Morse (1992) – Chief Inspector Holroyd
- Picking Up the Pieces (1998) – Vinny
- The Thing About Vince (2000) – Frankie
- The Sins (2000) – Archie Rogers
- McCready and Daughter (2001)
- EastEnders (2001–2002) – Ernie Johnson
