= Marty (TV series) =

- Written by: John Cleese; Tim Brooke-Taylor; John Junkin; Marty Feldman; Barry Took; Graham Chapman; Terry Jones; Philip Jenkinson; Donald Webster; Peter Dickinson; Terry Gilliam; Michael Palin; John Law; Frank Muir; Denis Norden
- Starring: Marty Feldman; Tim Brooke-Taylor; John Junkin; Roland MacLeod; Mary Miller; Peter Pocock
- Country of origin: United Kingdom
- No. of series: 2
- No. of specials: 6

Original release
- Release: April 29, 1968 – January 1, 1971

Marty is a British television sketch comedy series, with Marty Feldman, Tim Brooke-Taylor, John Junkin, Roland MacLeod, Mary Miller and Peter Pocock which was made in 1968. There was a second series made in 1969, re-titled It's Marty. In total, 12 episodes were produced.

The writers were John Cleese, Tim Brooke-Taylor, John Junkin, Marty Feldman, Barry Took, Graham Chapman, Terry Jones, Philip Jenkinson, Donald Webster, Peter Dickinson, Terry Gilliam, Michael Palin, John Law, Frank Muir and Denis Norden. Lionel Blair choreographed a routine for an episode of It's Marty. Took and Marty Feldman were given an award for the show by the actor Kenneth Horne.

A compilation of surviving sketches from the series has been released on DVD, with the title The Best of Marty Feldman.

== List of episodes ==
The following episodes, compilations and specials were produced for the BBC between 1968 and 1971.

=== Series 1 ===
Episode	Original air date	Sketches	Archival status
Series 1, Episode 1	29 April 1968	Opening: Ticket Agency - Bishop - The Candidate - Police 6 7/8 - Vet's Waiting Room - A Hard Day's Night	This episode does not survive completely
Series 1, Episode 2	6 May 1968	Irritation - Little Old Couple: Travel Agency - A Day In The Life Of A Stuntman - Parliamentary Report - Lady Chatterly - Eat Your Prunes - Tabletop Battleground - Whiffenpoof Song	Complete (colour) copy exists
Series 1, Episode 3	13 May 1968	Weather Report - No-one's Perfect (song) - Royalty At Soccer Match - Traffic - Salome - Headmaster Visits - The Yechh/Feet (song)	This episode does not survive completely
Series 1, Episode 4	20 May 1968	Dr. Jekyll - Little Old Couple 2: Marriage Councillor - Weighing Machine - The Wedding - Egyptian Statues - Bullfighter Policeman - Ballet - My Father's Shirt (song)	This episode does not survive completely
Series 1, Episode 5	27 May 1968	Eye-O-Fry - The Gnome - The Sentry - House Flies - Children's Playground - Who Are The Black And White Minstrels? - Father And Son - Opera Without Music - Rocking Chair	Complete (colour) copy exists
Series 1, Episode 6	3 June 1968	Is It True What They Say About Dixie? - Hospital Visitor - Driving Instructor - Backchat - Woodworm - Country Tavern - Florist Jungle	This episode does not survive completely

=== Series 2 ===
Episode	Original air date	Sketches	Archival status
Series 2, Episode 1	9 December 1968	B.B.C. Apology - May I Paint You In The Nude? - Lightning Coach Tour - Soccer Commentator - Gotcha - The Loneliness Of The Long Distance Golfer - Newspaper Expose - The Battle Of Britain's Taxis	Complete (colour) copy exists
Series 2, Episode 2	16 December 1968	Dixon Of Dock Green - Little Old Couple 3: Post Office - Fritz von Angst - The Stuntman On Holiday - My Kingdom For A Horse - The Seance	Complete (colour) copy exists
Series 2, Episode 3	23 December 1968	Orchestrated Coughing - Television Censorship - Obituary To David Frost - Telephone Callers - Pas De Deux - Danny Gruntfuttock - Carols	exists as black and white telerecording
Series 2, Episode 4	30 December 1968	Z-Cars - Insurance Policy - Kiss Me Hardy - Super Midwife - Serbian Restaurant - The Shooting Of Flicka - Holiday Movies - Population Explosion - Henry V - Late Night Call From Mother - Is It Wrong To Love An Elephant? (song) - The Curse Of The Mandervilles/Flying Rabbi	Complete (colour) copy exists
Series 2, Episode 5	6 January 1969	Mr. Christian - House Welcomer - Clothists - Football Reunion - Headmaster's Office - French Song For Sauce Lovers - Auction - Newsreader - A Life In The Clergy - Hospital Visitor	Complete (colour) copy exists
Series 2, Episode 6	13 January 1969	Call Marty Feldman - Wine Treaders - The Fly - Short-sighted Driver - Science Lecture - Cost Of Living - Punch And Judy	Complete (colour) copy exists

=== Specials ===
Episode	Original air date	Sketches	Archival status
Montreux entry	17 March 1969	This compilation was the British entry for the Montreux festival.	Complete (colour) copy exists
Compilation 1	9 January 1970	A selection of highlights from the previous series.	This episode does not survive completely
Compilation 2	23 January 1970	A selection of highlights from the previous series.	Complete (colour) copy exists
Compilation 3	6 February 1970	A selection of highlights from the previous series.	Complete (colour) copy exists
Marty Amok	30 March 1970	A 46-minute one-off special. Restaurant Specialty - Bookshop [first performed on At Last the 1948 Show] - Cricket - French Restaurant [with guest star Robert Dhéry] - "11 Mustachioed Daughters" [musical performance by Vivian Stanshall's Big Grunt] - Friendly Neighborhood Door-to-Door Judge - Royal Handicap - Airline Pilots [first performed on How to Irritate People] - Attila the Hun - Buying a Double Bed - Changing Cubicles - Western Film	Complete (colour) copy exists
Marty Abroad	1 January 1971	A holiday-themed special.	Complete (colour) copy exists

== Awards ==
- 1969 BAFTA Television Awards

Best Light Entertainment Performer - won by Marty Feldman
Best Light Entertainment Production - won by Dennis Main-Wilson
Best Writer - won by Marty Feldman and Barry Took

- 1969 Writer's Guild of Great Britain Award

Best British Light Entertainment Script - won by the series writers of Marty and It's Marty
