= Marty Feldman =

British actor and comedian (1934–1982)

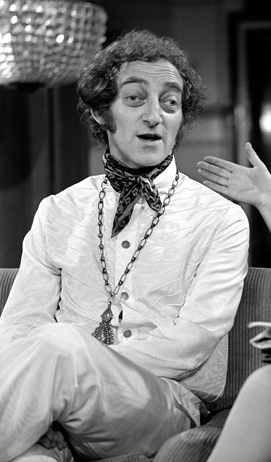
- Feldman in 1969
- Born: Martin Alan Feldman; 8 July 1934; Canning Town, London, England
- Died: 2 December 1982 (aged 48); Mexico City, Mexico
- Resting place: Forest Lawn Memorial Park (Hollywood Hills)
- Occupations: Actor; comedian; writer
- Years active: 1948–1982
- Spouse: Lauretta Sullivan (m. 1959)
- Awards: BAFTAs: Best Light Entertainment Performance; 1968 Marty; Best Writer; 1968 Marty

Martin Alan Feldman (8 July 1934 – 2 December 1982) was a British actor, comedian and writer. He was known for his prominent, misaligned eyes.

He initially gained prominence as a writer with Barry Took on the ITV sitcom Bootsie and Snudge and the BBC Radio comedy programme Round the Horne. He became known as a performer on At Last the 1948 Show (co-writing the Four Yorkshiremen sketch, which Monty Python would later perform) and Marty, the latter winning him two British Academy Television Awards, including Best Entertainment Performance in 1969.

Feldman went on to appear in films such as The Bed Sitting Room and Every Home Should Have One, the latter being one of the most popular comedies at the British box office in 1970. In 1971, he starred in the comedy-variety sketch series for ATV called The Marty Feldman Comedy Machine. In 1974, he appeared as Igor in Mel Brooks' Young Frankenstein, for which he received the first Saturn Award for Best Supporting Actor. He died in 1982 of a heart attack while filming Yellowbeard in Mexico City.

== Early life ==
Feldman was born on 8 July 1934 in Canning Town, east London, the son of Cecilia (née Crook) and Myer Feldman, a gown manufacturer. His parents were Ukrainian Jewish immigrants from Kyiv. He recalled his childhood as "solitary", especially during his years of evacuation to the countryside during the Second World War.

Feldman suffered from thyroid disease and developed Graves' ophthalmopathy, causing his eyes to protrude and become misaligned. A childhood injury, a car crash, a boating accident and reconstructive eye surgery may also have contributed to his appearance. He later described his appearance as a factor in his career success: "If I aspired to be Robert Redford, I'd have my eyes straightened and my nose fixed and end up like every other lousy actor, with two lines on Kojak. But this way, I'm a novelty."

== Career ==
=== Early career ===
Leaving school at the minimum age of 15, Feldman worked at the Dreamland funfair in Margate, but had dreams of a career as a jazz trumpeter, and performed in the first group in which tenor saxophonist Tubby Hayes was a member. Feldman joked that he was "the world's worst trumpet player." By the age of 20, he had decided to pursue a career as a comedian.

Although his early performing career was undistinguished, Feldman became part of a comedy act—Morris, Marty and Mitch—who made their first television appearance on the BBC series Showcase in April 1955. Later in the decade, Feldman worked on the scripts for Educating Archie in both its radio and television incarnations, with Ronald Chesney and later, Ronald Wolfe.

In 1954, Feldman met Barry Took while both were working as performers, and with Took, he eventually formed an enduring writing partnership which lasted until 1974. They wrote a few episodes of The Army Game (1960) and the bulk of Bootsie and Snudge (1960–62), both situation comedies made by Granada Television for the ITV network. For BBC Radio they wrote Round the Horne (1964–67), their best-remembered comedy series, which starred Kenneth Horne and Kenneth Williams. (The last series of Round the Horne, in 1968, was written by others.) This work placed Feldman and Took 'in the front rank of comedy writers', according to Denis Norden.

Feldman then became the chief writer and script editor on The Frost Report (1966–67). With John Law, he co-wrote the much-shown "Class" sketch, in which John Cleese, Ronnie Barker and Ronnie Corbett faced the audience, with their descending order of height, suggesting their relative social status as upper class (Cleese), middle class (Barker) and working class (Corbett).

=== Ascent ===
The television sketch comedy series At Last the 1948 Show raised Feldman's profile as a performer. The other three participants (future Monty Python members Graham Chapman and John Cleese; and future star of The Goodies Tim Brooke-Taylor) needed a fourth cast member, and had Feldman in mind. In a sketch broadcast on 1 March 1967, Feldman's character harassed a patient shop assistant (played by Cleese) regarding a series of fictitious books, achieving success with Ethel the Aardvark Goes Quantity Surveying. His character in At Last the 1948 Show was often called Mr. Pest, according to Cleese. Feldman was co-author—along with Chapman, Cleese and Brooke-Taylor—of the sketch "Four Yorkshiremen", which was written for At Last the 1948 Show, later adapted by Monty Python for their stage performances.

Feldman was given his own series on the BBC, Marty, in 1968; it featured Brooke-Taylor, John Junkin and Roland MacLeod, with Cleese as one of the writers. Feldman won two BAFTA awards. The second series in 1969 was retitled It's Marty (this title being retained for the DVD release of the series).

Marty proved popular enough with an international audience (the first series winning the Golden Rose Award at Montreux) to launch a film career. Feldman's first feature film role was in Every Home Should Have One (1970).

=== After 1970 ===
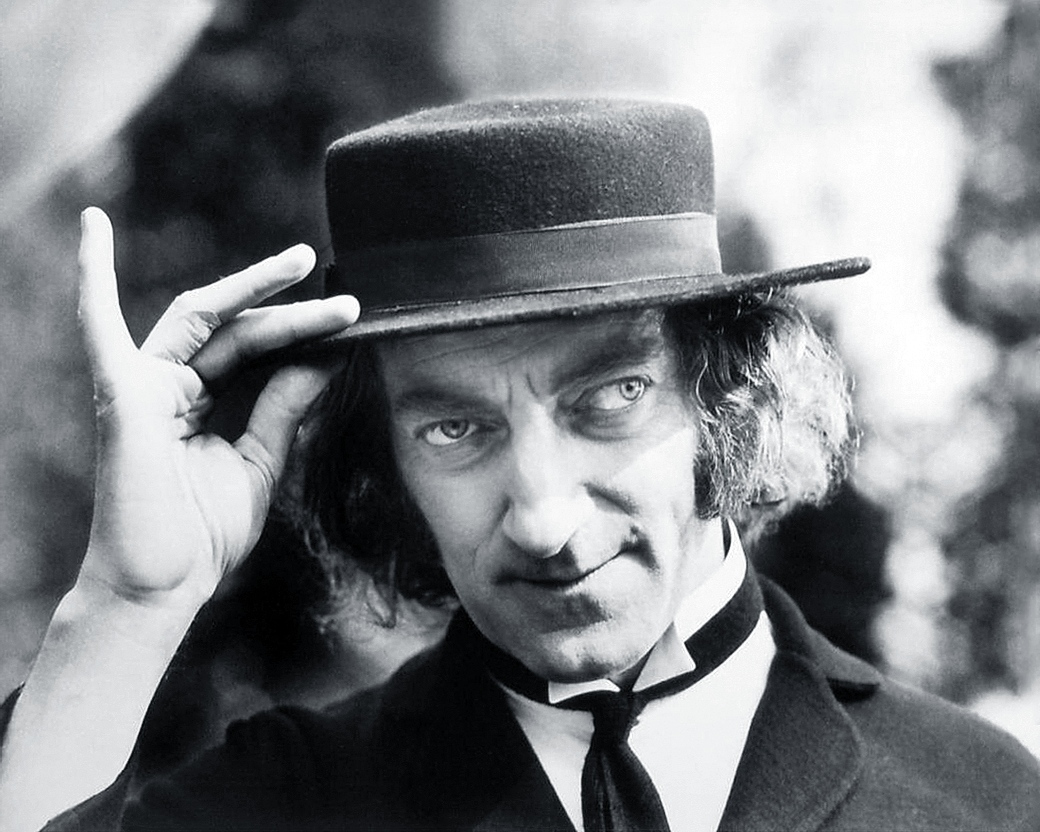
Promotional photo for The Marty Feldman Comedy Machine, 1972

The Marty Feldman Comedy Machine (1971–72) was a television series co-produced by Associated Television (ATV) in the UK and the American Broadcasting Company, produced at ATV's Elstree Studios, near London. This vehicle lasted for just one series.

In 1974, Dennis Main Wilson produced a short BBC sketch series for Feldman titled Marty Back Together Again—a reference to reports about the star's health—but it never captured the impact of the earlier series.

On film, in Mel Brooks' Young Frankenstein (1974), Feldman played Igor (pronounced "EYE-gore", a comic response to Gene Wilder's claim that 'it's pronounced FRONK-en-steen'). Many lines in Young Frankenstein were improvised. Wilder said he had Feldman in mind when he wrote the part.

Feldman's performances on American television included The Dean Martin Show.

In 1976, Feldman ventured into Italian cinema, starring with Dayle Haddon in the sex comedy 40 Gradi All'Ombra del Lenzuolo (Sex with a Smile). He later appeared in The Adventure of Sherlock Holmes' Smarter Brother and Brooks' Silent Movie, as well as directing and starring in The Last Remake of Beau Geste. He also guest-starred in "Arabian Nights", an episode of The Muppet Show in which he was teamed up with several Sesame Street characters, especially Cookie Monster, with whom he shared a playful cameo comparing their eyes side by side.

=== Recording career ===
During the course of his career, Feldman recorded two albums, Marty (1968) and I Feel a Song Going Off (1969), re-released in 1971 as The Crazy World of Marty Feldman. The songs on his second album were written by Denis King, John Junkin and Bill Solly (a writer for Max Bygraves and The Two Ronnies). It was later released as a CD in 2007.

== Personal life ==
From January 1959 until his death in 1982, Feldman was married to Lauretta Sullivan. She died in 2010, at the age of 74, in Studio City, Los Angeles. Feldman's peers have reported, in a number of biographies, that he was highly attractive to women in spite of his unconventional facial appearance. He spent time in jazz clubs, as he found a parallel between 'riffing' in a comedy partnership and the improvisation of jazz.

Politically, Feldman was described as an "avowed socialist", telling one interviewer, "I'm a socialist by conviction, if not by lifestyle", and another, "I'm a socialist from way back, but in order to pay my back taxes I have to live in America to earn enough money to pay the back tax I owe to the socialist government that I voted in." He later joked that when a Labour cabinet minister said to him, "Of course you vote Labour", Feldman replied, "No, I don't, because I'm a socialist!" Nevertheless, he generally did not seriously discuss politics in public, and once stated: "I feel it would be presumptuous for me to make any statements about American politics because I'm a guest here."

An exception was during a promotional tour for The Last Remake of Beau Geste, when he denounced the campaign led by Anita Bryant against homosexuality. Another exception was after the murder of his friend John Lennon. Feldman subsequently became an anti-gun advocate in the US, even wearing an anti-gun t-shirt and hat pin during his appearance on the late night TV show Fridays.

In 1971, Feldman gave evidence in favour of the defendants in the obscenity trial for Oz magazine. He chose not to swear on the Bible, but to affirm. Throughout his testimony, he mocked the judge after it was implied that Feldman had no religion because he was not Christian.

Feldman was a lacto-ovo vegetarian. In a 1979 interview, when asked how long he had practised this, he stated: "I was about five and a half or six when I converted; I'm forty-three now, so it's been approximately thirty-eight years."

Feldman wrote an autobiography, Eye Marty: The Newly Discovered Autobiography of a Comic Genius, which was brought to light following Lauretta's death. It was published in 2012 with a foreword by Eric Idle.

== Death ==
Feldman's gravestone in Forest Lawn Memorial Park

Feldman died of a heart attack in a hotel room in Mexico City on 2 December 1982 at age 48 during the making of the film Yellowbeard; the film was subsequently dedicated to him. According to an editor's note in Feldman's posthumously published autobiography, Graham Chapman was with him at the time of his death.

His funeral was held on 6 December 1982, in the Hollywood Hills, where eulogies were given and the services were "tinged with laughter and jazz music". The 20-minute service was attended by about 100 relatives and friends, including fellow comedians Cheech Marin, Dom DeLuise and Mel Brooks.

Feldman is buried in the Garden of Heritage at Forest Lawn – Hollywood Hills Cemetery, California, near the graves of Stan Laurel and Buster Keaton, two comics he idolised.

== Filmography ==
=== Film ===
| Year | Title | Role | Notes |
|---|---|---|---|
| 1969 | The Bed Sitting Room | Nurse Arthur | |
| 1970 | Every Home Should Have One | Teddy Brown | |
| 1971 | The Magnificent Seven Deadly Sins | Man kicking Tree | cameo segment "Sloth"; writer segment "Lust" |
| 1972 | Today Mexico, Tomorrow the World | Football player Marty | short film |
| 1974 | Young Frankenstein | Igor | |
| 1975 | The Adventure of Sherlock Holmes' Smarter Brother | Sgt. Orville Stanley Sacker | |
| 1975 | Closed Up-Tight | Cat burglar | |
| 1976 | 40 gradi all'ombra del lenzuolo (Sex With a Smile) | Alex | segment "La Guardia del Corpo" |
| 1976 | Silent Movie | Marty Eggs | |
| 1977 | The Last Remake of Beau Geste | Dagobert 'Digby' Geste | Also director & writer |
| 1980 | In God We Tru$t | Brother Ambrose | Also director & writer |
| 1982 | Slapstick of Another Kind | Sylvester | Released posthumously in the U.S. in March 1984 |
| 1983 | Yellowbeard | Gilbert | Released posthumously (final film role) |

=== Television ===
| Year | Title | Role | Notes |
|---|---|---|---|
| 1967 | At Last the 1948 Show | various characters | |
| 1968–69 | Marty / It's Marty | various characters | |
| 1970 | Marty Amok! | various characters | television special |
| 1971 | Marty Abroad | various characters | television special |
| 1971–72 | The Marty Feldman Comedy Machine | himself | |
| 1971–73 | The Flip Wilson Show | himself | 2 episodes |
| 1972 | The Marty Feldman Show | various | television movie |
| 1972 | The Carol Burnett Show | self – various characters | Episode: "Carol Channing and Marty Feldman" |
| 1972 | The Sandy Duncan Show | Burglar | 2 episodes |
| 1972–74 | The Merv Griffin Show | self | 3 episodes |
| 1972–80 | The Tonight Show Starring Johnny Carson | self | 4 episodes |
| 1972–77 | Hollywood Squares | self – panelist | 7 episodes |
| 1974 | Marty Back Together Again | various characters | |
| 1975 | Cher | self | Episode S1.E7 |
| 1975 | The Goodies | Guest Appearance | Episode: "Scatty Safari" |
| 1975 | Karen | John Himmelman | Episode: "Them" |
| 1977–79 | The Mike Douglas Show | self | 2 episodes |
| 1981–82 | Fridays | self – Guest Host | 2 episodes |
| 1981 | Insight | Josh | Episode: "The Sixth Day" |
| 1981 | The Muppet Show | himself | Episode: "Arabian Nights" |

== Radio series ==
- Round the Horne (co-writer with Barry Took)
