= Tim Brooke-Taylor =

English actor and comedian (1940–2020)

Tim Brooke-Taylor OBE
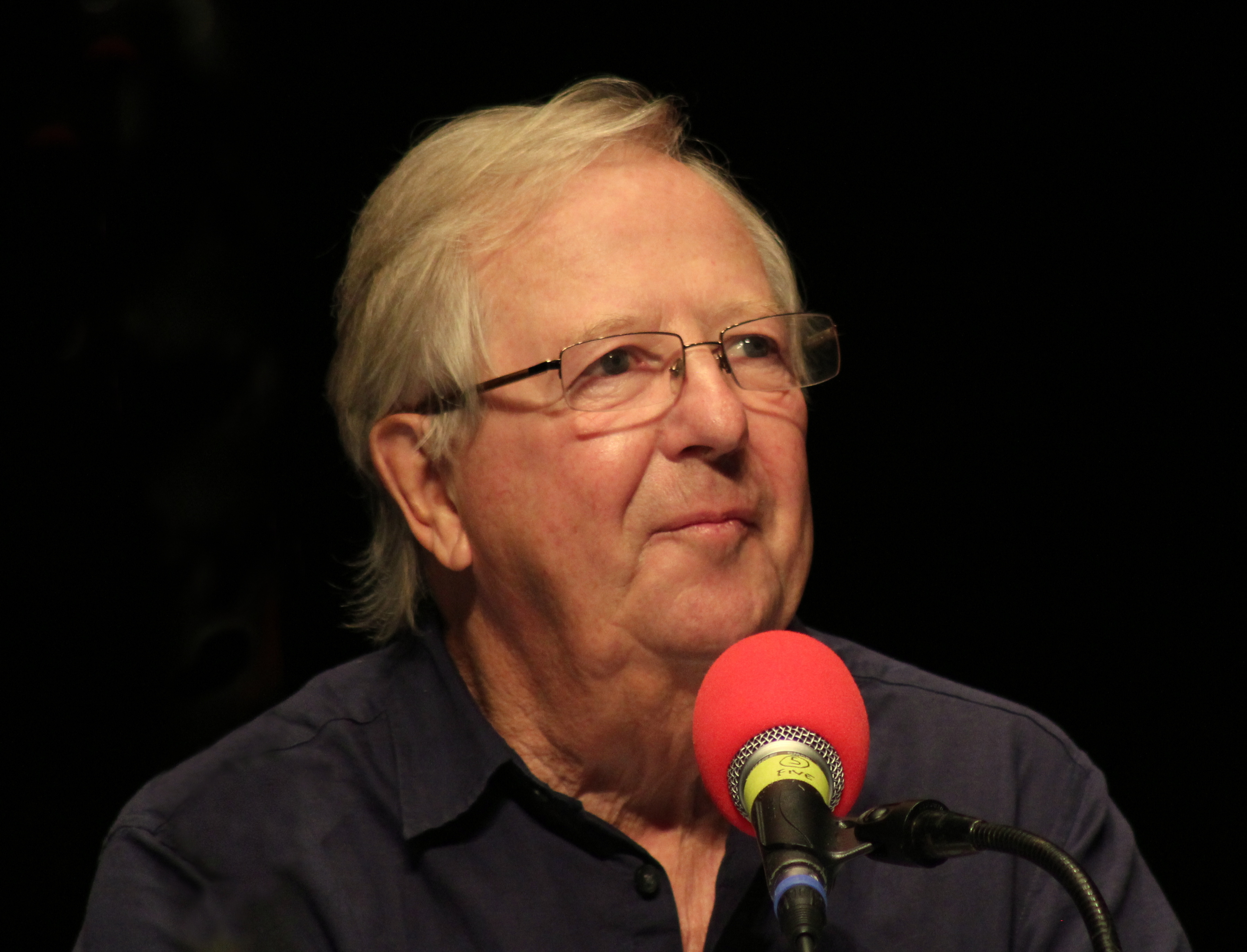
- Brooke-Taylor in 2014
- Born: Timothy Julian Brooke-Taylor; 17 July 1940; Buxton, Derbyshire, England
- Died: 12 April 2020 (aged 79); Cookham, Berkshire, England
- Education: Pembroke College, Cambridge
- Occupations: Actor; comedian
- Notable work: I'm Sorry, I'll Read That Again (1964–1973); At Last the 1948 Show (1967); How to Irritate People (1968); Marty (1968–1969); Broaden Your Mind (1968–1969); The Goodies (1970–1982); I'm Sorry I Haven't a Clue (1972–2020); One Foot in the Grave (1997)
- Spouse: Christine Wheadon (m. 1968)
- Children: 2

Comedy career
- Years active: 1964–2020
- Medium: Film, television, radio, theatre
- Genre: Sketch comedy

Timothy Julian Brooke-Taylor (17 July 1940 – 12 April 2020) was an English actor and comedian. He was best known as a member of The Goodies.

Brooke-Taylor became active in performing in comedy sketches while at the University of Cambridge and became president of the Footlights, touring internationally with its revue in 1964. Becoming more widely known to the public for his work on BBC Radio with I'm Sorry, I'll Read That Again, he moved into television with At Last the 1948 Show, working together with old Cambridge friends John Cleese and Graham Chapman. With Graeme Garden and Bill Oddie, he starred in The Goodies (1970–1982), picking up international recognition in Australia, Canada and New Zealand. He appeared as an actor in various sitcoms and was a panellist on BBC Radio's I'm Sorry I Haven't a Clue for almost 50 years.

== Early life and education ==
Timothy Julian Brooke-Taylor was born on 17 July 1940 in Buxton, Derbyshire, son of Edward Brooke-Taylor, a solicitor, and games teacher and international lacrosse player Rachel, daughter of Francis Pawson, a parson who played centre forward for the English football team in the 1880s. He was expelled from primary school at the early age of five and a half. Brooke-Taylor was then schooled at Thorn Leigh Pre-Preparatory School, Holm Leigh Preparatory School (where he won a cup for his prowess as a bowler in the school cricket team) and Winchester College which he left with seven O-levels and two A-levels in English and history.

After teaching for a year at Lockers Park School, a preparatory school in Hemel Hempstead and a term back at Holm Leigh School as a teacher, he studied at Pembroke College, Cambridge. There he read economics and politics before changing to read law and mixed with other budding comedians, including John Cleese, Graham Chapman, Bill Oddie, Graeme Garden and Jonathan Lynn in the Cambridge University Footlights Club (of which Brooke-Taylor became president in 1963).

The Footlights Club revue, A Clump of Plinths, was so successful during its Edinburgh Festival Fringe run that the show was renamed as Cambridge Circus and transferred to the West End in London before being taken to both New Zealand and Broadway in the United States in September 1964. Brooke-Taylor was also active in the Pembroke College drama society, the Pembroke Players.

== Career ==
Brooke-Taylor moved into BBC Radio with the comedy show I'm Sorry, I'll Read That Again which he performed in and co-wrote. As the eccentric Lady Constance de Coverlet, he could be relied upon to generate an audience response of many programmes in this long-running series merely with her catchphrase "Did somebody call?" uttered after a transparent feed-line, as their adventure story reached its climax or cliffhanger ending. Other members of I'm Sorry, I'll Read That Again were John Cleese, Bill Oddie, Graeme Garden, David Hatch and Jo Kendall.

In the mid-1960s, Brooke-Taylor performed in the television series On the Braden Beat with Canadian Bernard Braden, taking over the slot recently vacated by Peter Cook in his guise as E. L. Wisty. Brooke-Taylor played a reactionary City gent who believed he was the soul of tolerance.

In 1967, Brooke-Taylor became a writer/performer on the television comedy series At Last the 1948 Show, with John Cleese, Graham Chapman and Marty Feldman. The "Four Yorkshiremen" sketch was co-written by the four writers and performers of the series. The sketch appears on the DVD of At Last the 1948 Show. Footage of Brooke-Taylor and Cleese from At Last the 1948 Show was shown on the documentary special Monty Python: Almost the Truth (Lawyers Cut). The sketch has since become known for its satirical depiction of Britain's class system and North-South divide.

Brooke-Taylor took part in David Frost's pilot programme How to Irritate People in 1968, designed to sell what would later be recognised as the Monty Python style of comedy to the American market. Many of the sketches were later revived in the Monty Python TV series, such as the job interview sketch in which Brooke-Taylor played a nervous interviewee tormented by interviewer John Cleese. The programme was the first collaboration between Cleese and Michael Palin. One of the sketches referred to Cleese's character dating a promiscuous woman named "Christine Wheadon", which was the name of Brooke-Taylor's wife.

Also in 1968, Brooke-Taylor made an unexpected and uninvited guest appearance in an episode of Do Not Adjust Your Set, filling in for Michael Palin who was ill that week. The episode he was in still survives and has been included in DVD compilation sets.

In 1968–69, Brooke-Taylor was a cast member and writer on the television comedy series Marty starring Marty Feldman, with John Junkin and Roland MacLeod. A compilation of the two series of Marty has been released on a BBC DVD entitled The Best of Marty Feldman. During this period Brooke-Taylor appeared as two characters in the film One Man Band directed by Orson Welles; however, the project was never completed and remains unreleased.

At around the same time, Brooke-Taylor made two series of Broaden Your Mind with Garden (and Oddie joining for the second series). Describing itself as "An Encyclopedia of the Air", the show was a string of comedy sketches (often lifted from I'm Sorry I'll Read That Again), linked (loosely) by a weekly running theme.

The success of Broaden Your Mind led to the commissioning of The Goodies, with Oddie and Garden. First transmitted on BBC2 in November 1970, The Goodies was a television success, broadcast for over a decade by both the BBC and (in its final year) by ITV contractor London Weekend Television, spawning many spin-off books and successful records.

During the run of The Goodies, Brooke-Taylor took part in the BBC radio series Hello Cheeky, a bawdy stand-up comedy show also starring Barry Cryer and John Junkin. The series transferred to television briefly, produced for ITV by the commercial franchise Yorkshire Television.

He appeared on television in British sitcoms, including You Must Be the Husband with Diane Keen, His and Hers with Madeline Smith and Me and My Girl with Richard O'Sullivan. He starred in the Radio 4 comedy series Tell Me Where It Hurts in 1979. Brooke-Taylor appeared regularly in advertisements, including the Christmas commercials for the Brentford Nylons chain of fabric stores and in a public information film for the now-defunct E111 form, since replaced by the European Health Insurance Card.

In 1971, he played the short, uncredited role of a computer scientist in the film Willy Wonka & the Chocolate Factory; his scene was the final one filmed for the movie. After The Goodies on UK television, Brooke-Taylor worked again with Garden and Oddie on the television animated comedy series Bananaman, in which Brooke-Taylor was the narrator, as well as voicing the characters of King Zorg of the Nurks, Eddie the Gent, Auntie and Appleman. He lent his voice to the children's TV series Gideon.

Brooke-Taylor appeared in Amnesty International shows: in A Poke in the Eye (With a Sharp Stick) he, Oddie and Garden, sang their hit song "Funky Gibbon", whilst in The Secret Policeman's Other Ball he took part in the sketches "Top of the Form" (with Cleese, Chapman, John Bird, John Fortune, Rowan Atkinson and Griff Rhys Jones), and "Cha Cha Cha" (with Cleese and Chapman). Brooke-Taylor, Garden and Oddie appeared on Top of the Pops to perform "Funky Gibbon". Garden joined Brooke-Taylor in the theatre production of The Unvarnished Truth.

Other BBC radio programmes in which Brooke-Taylor played a part include the self-styled "antidote to panel games" I'm Sorry I Haven't a Clue, which started in 1972; he took part regularly for over 40 years. On 18 February 1981, Brooke-Taylor, was the subject of Thames Television's This Is Your Life.

In the early 1980s Brooke-Taylor appeared in a number of skits on The Paul Hogan Show in Australia.

In 1997, he appeared in a special episode of One Foot in the Grave.

In 1998, Brooke-Taylor appeared as a guest in one episode of the political satire game show If I Ruled the World.

In 2004, Brooke-Taylor and Garden were co-presenters of Channel 4's daytime game show, Beat the Nation, in which they indulged in typical game show "banter", but took the quiz itself seriously. He appeared on stage in Australia and England, usually as a middle class Englishman, e.g. starring as Donald in a 1991 revival of Christopher Hampton's play The Philanthropist. The production, starring Edward Fox, played at Wyndham's Theatre in London from 15th May to 5th October 1991, following a regional tour. In the early 1980s, he branched out into pantomime as the Dame in Dick Whittington. He was the author (and co-author) of several humorous books, based mainly on his radio and television work, and the sports of golf and cricket. His interest in golf came to the fore when he took part in the Pro-Celebrity Golf television series (opposite Bruce Forsyth), and appeared in the premiere episode of the BBC's golf-based game show Full Swing.

In 2008, Brooke-Taylor was heard in the Doctor Who audio story The Zygon Who Fell To Earth, made by Big Finish Productions. Paul McGann played the Eighth Doctor and Brooke-Taylor played the part of Mims, a Zygon taking the shape of a human.

Also in 2008, Brooke-Taylor was a team captain on What the Dickens?, hosted by Sandi Toksvig on Sky Arts.

Brooke-Taylor made his final public appearance when he attended the Bristol slapstick festival in January 2020, 3 months before his death.

== Lord Rector of the University of St Andrews ==
Brooke-Taylor was elected Lord Rector by the students of the University of St Andrews and held office between 1979 and 1982. In this role he represented the students, chaired the University Court and presided over the General Council in the absence of the Chancellor. At his installation he arrived by helicopter, rode a motorbike and was hauled in an open carriage as part of The Drag. His installation speech included a mother-in-law joke in Latin and a suggestion his successor should be a woman; he was succeeded by Katherine Whitehorn who was elected unopposed as the university's first female rector in 1982. Brooke-Taylor is remembered as an effective Rector who visited the town frequently, took the role seriously, wore a Saltire waistcoat while there and is said to have remarked that St Andrews was "the happiest university" he had been to.

== Personal life and death ==
Brooke-Taylor married Christine Wheadon in 1968 and they had two sons. He lived in Cookham Dean, Berkshire and was involved in local events. A keen golfer, he was a member of Temple Golf Club. He was appointed Officer of the Order of the British Empire (OBE) in the 2011 Birthday Honours for services to light entertainment.

Brooke-Taylor died of complications from COVID-19 on 12 April 2020, aged 79, in Cookham, Berkshire. In tribute to Brooke-Taylor, the flag of his alma mater, Pembroke College, Cambridge, was lowered to half-mast the following day.

== Filmography ==
=== Film ===
Year	Title	Role	Notes
1968	One Man Band	Reporter / Young Aristocrat	Uncompleted / Unreleased
1969	The Thirteen Chairs	Jackie	
1971	The Statue	Hillcrest	
1971	Willy Wonka & the Chocolate Factory	Computer Scientist	Uncredited
1976	Pleasure at Her Majesty's	Tim (with The Goodies)	
1981	The Secret Policeman's Other Ball	Various	
1988	Under the Bed	Bin Man	
1989	Asterix and the Big Fight	Cacofonix	Voice, English version / Final film role

=== Television ===
Year	Title	Role	Notes
1966	The Wednesday Play	Uncredited Role	Episode: Cathy Come Home
1967–1968	At Last the 1948 Show	Various Characters	Also Writer
1968	How to Irritate People	Various Characters	Also Writer
1968–1969	Marty	Various Characters	Also Writer
1968–1969	Broaden Your Mind	Various Characters	Also Writer
1970–1972	His and Hers	Toby Burgess / Larry Seaton	7 episodes
1970–1982	The Goodies	Tim	Also Writer
1975	The Rough with the Smooth	Richard Woodville	Also Writer
1976–1979	Hello Cheeky	Himself	Also Writer
1983–1986	Bananaman	Eric Twinge	Voice
1984–1988	Me and My Girl	Derek Yates	
1985	Assaulted Nuts	Various Characters	
1987–1988	You Must Be the Husband	Tom Hammond	
1989	Barney	Barney	Voice
1991	Qd - The Master Game	Himself	Presenter
1992	The Upper Hand	Trevor	Episode: Blind Date
1996	Dennis the Menace	Barney	Voice, Episode: Unidentified Funny Object
1997	One Foot in the Grave	Derek McVitie	Episode: "Endgame"
1999	The Nearly Complete and Utter History of Everything		
2002	TLC	Hospital Chaplain	
2004	Beat the Nation	Quiz Co-Host	Co-Host with Graeme Garden
2005	Absolute Power	Peter Harrow	
2005–2009	Heartbeat	Ronnie Smethers	Guest Role
2008	Agatha Christie's Marple	Dr Edward Humbleby	Episode: Murder is Easy
2009	Horne & Corden	Vicar	
2010–2011	Little Howard's Big Question	Various Characters	
2013	Animal Antics	Co-Host	
2015	Doctors	Graham Parsons	Episode: About Time

=== Radio ===
Year	Show or film	Role	Notes
1964–1973	I'm Sorry, I'll Read That Again	Various Characters	Wrote for the series
1973–1979	Hello Cheeky (radio show)	Himself	Wrote for the series
1972–2020	I'm Sorry I Haven't a Clue	Himself	Panel show

== Bibliography ==
As sole author

- Rule Britannia OCLC 730965215
- Tim Brooke-Taylor's Golf Bag OCLC 153808703
- Tim Brooke-Taylor's Cricket Box OCLC 221735762

As co-author

- Brooke-Taylor also co-wrote the following books with the other members of The Goodies:

- The Goodies File OCLC 16377151
- The Goodies Book of Criminal Records OCLC 16367881
- The Making of The Goodies Disaster Movie OCLC 3882046

Academic offices
Preceded by Frank Muir	Rector of the University of St Andrews; 1979–1982	Succeeded by Katharine Whitehorn
