= Roland MacLeod =

English actor (1935–2010)

Roland MacLeod (1935 – 3 April 2010) was an English actor working in film and television. He was born in London.

His television credits include Coronation Street, Softly, Softly, Ripping Yarns, The Fall and Rise of Reginald Perrin, Sykes, Please Sir!, Some Mothers Do 'Ave 'Em, Marty, Broaden Your Mind, The Howerd Confessions,and The Goodies. He also made some appearances in Season Three of Grange Hill as a slightly comical workman sporting a comb over, often seen in confrontation with staff and pupils. However, his character showed a kinder side when he cleaned Duane Orpington's new coat in episode two. He also played the mad Head Teacher in The Boot Street Band, a TV series written by Steve Attridge and Andrew Davies.

He appeared as a vicar in John Cleese's film A Fish Called Wanda as well as in Le Pétomane and The Last Remake of Beau Geste.
