= David Hatch =

English broadcaster

Sir David Hatch CBE JP
- Born: David Edwin Hatch; 7 May 1939; Barnsley, West Riding of Yorkshire, England
- Died: 13 June 2007 (aged 68); Chalfont St Giles, Buckinghamshire, England
- Partners: Ann Martin (m. 1964; died 1997); Mary Clancy (m. 1999)
- Children: 3

Sir David Edwin Hatch, CBE JP (7 May 1939 – 13 June 2007) was an English broadcaster, involved in production and management at BBC Radio where he held many executive positions, including Head of Light Entertainment (Radio), Controller of BBC Radio 2 and BBC Radio 4 and later managing director of BBC Radio.

== Education ==
Born in Barnsley, he attended St John's School, Leatherhead and Queens' College, Cambridge, where he arrived to study theology but switched to history, and joined the Cambridge Footlights Club. He was a member of the cast of the 1963 Footlights revue A Clump of Plinths, which was so successful during its run at the Edinburgh Festival Fringe that the revue transferred to the West End of London under the title of Cambridge Circus and later taken on tour to both New Zealand and Broadway in September 1964. Hatch was later a student teacher at Bloxham School, Oxfordshire.

== BBC work ==
A BBC Radio production of Cambridge Circus, entitled I'm Sorry, I'll Read That Again, launched many of the show's cast, including Hatch, into a radio comedy series of the same name. Meanwhile, he was responsible for the radio versions of Doctor in the House, Doctor at Large, Brothers in Law and All Gas and Gaiters. Hatch co-devised the satirical show Week Ending and produced other comedy radio shows such as Just a Minute, Hello, Cheeky!, The Burkiss Way, From Us To You, Stiff Upper Lip, Jeeves, The Frankie Howerd Show (1974) and I'm Sorry I Haven't A Clue.

Some of these overlapped with his earlier executive positions in the BBC: Radio Network Editor, BBC Manchester 1974–78; Head of Light Entertainment (Radio), BBC 1978–80; Controller, BBC Radio 2 1980–83; Controller, BBC Radio 4 1983–86; Director of Programmes, BBC Radio (later Network Radio, BBC) 1986–87, managing director 1987–93; Vice-Chairman, BBC Enterprises 1987–93; Adviser to the Director-General, BBC 1993–95. In 1990, he created the original Radio 5. He was appointed CBE in the 1994 Birthday Honours for services to radio broadcasting.

Hatch was a regular chairman of the radio panel quiz game Wireless Wise (1999–2003), made for BBC Radio 4 by Testbed Productions, and presented or appeared in other programmes including an edition of Radio Heads (2003), a three-hour omnibus collection of his radio programmes on BBC 7, and a Radio 4 Archive Hour (2006) celebration of the BBC's Broadcasting House building in London.

== Later career ==
Hatch left the Corporation and became Chairman of the National Consumer Council (1996–2000) and later of the Parole Board for England and Wales (2000–2004), for which he was knighted in the 2004 New Year Honours. In the latter role in 2003, he described Tony Martin, the farmer convicted of manslaughter, as a "very dangerous man" in an interview for The Times.

Hatch was also the chairman of SSVC (the Services Sound and Vision Corporation) between 1999 and 2004. After retiring, he retained the position of Life Vice-President on the SSVC Board of Trustees. SSVC operated many facilities on behalf of the MoD including BFBS Radio and TV.

Hatch was a Fellow of The Radio Academy.
