= List of former Footlights members =

This is a list of former Footlights sketch comedy troupe members who have achieved notability after graduating from the University of Cambridge. The careers of many prominent figures in the world of entertainment began in Footlights, while prominent figures in other industries also took part in the troupe. They include:

Name	Birth	Career
Douglas Adams	1952	Comedy writer, known for The Hitchhiker's Guide to the Galaxy
Clive Anderson	1952	Comedian, television presenter, barrister
David Armand	1977	Comedian, actor, member of The Hollow Men
Alexander Armstrong	1970	Comedian, television presenter, singer, half of Armstrong and Miller
Ben Ashenden	1989	Actor, writer, comedian
Anne Atkins	1955	Novelist, broadcaster
Pete Atkin	1945	Singer-songwriter, radio producer, known for This Sceptred Isle
Richard Ayoade	1977	Comedian, actor, director, co-creator of Garth Marenghi
James Bachman	1972	Comedian, actor, writer
David Baddiel	1964	Comedian, novelist, television presenter, half of Newman and Baddiel
Morwenna Banks	1961	Comedian, actress
Humphrey Barclay	1941	Comedy executive, producer of I'm Sorry, I'll Read That Again
Brian Barder	1934	Diplomat, popular blogger
Tom Basden	1981	Comedy writer and performer, singer-songwriter, member of Cowards
Robert Bathurst	1957	Actor
Cecil Beaton	1904	Photographer, interior designer, stage and costume designer
Tom Bell	1981	Actor, comedian, writer
Max Bennett	1984	Actor
Peter Bennett-Jones	1956	Television producer and agent, co-founder of Tiger Aspect and Comic Relief
Martin Bergman	1957	Producer, writer, director
John Bird	1936	Comedian, actor, satirist, member of Bremner, Bird and Fortune
Simon Bird	1984	Comedian, actor, known for The Inbetweeners
Timothy Birdsall	1936	Cartoonist
Jasmine Birtles		Journalist, author, presenter
Mark Bittlestone	1993	Comedian
Christopher Booker	1937	Journalist, author, founding editor of Private Eye
Peter Bradshaw	1962	Writer, film critic
Katie Breathwick	1971	Radio journalist, broadcaster
Leslie Bricusse	1931	Lyricist, composer, playwright, known for Willy Wonka & the Chocolate Factory
Eleanor Bron	1938	Actress, writer
Oscar Browning	1837	Educationalist, historian
Tim Brooke-Taylor	1940	Comedy writer and performer, member of The Goodies
Gus Brown	1974	Comedian, actor, half of Laurence and Gus
Spencer Brown	1978	Comedian
Robert Buckman	1948	Comedian, writer, television presenter, columnist, physician
Tony Buffery	1939	Psychologist, actor, comedian, writer, known for Twice a Fortnight
John Cameron	1944	Composer, arranger, conductor, musician
Jon Canter	1953	Comedy scriptwriter, principal writer for Lenny Henry
Graham Chapman	1941	Comedian, actor, writer, member of Monty Python
Charles III	1948	King of the United Kingdom and 14 other Commonwealth realms
Ken Cheng	1988	Poker player, comedian
John Cleese	1939	Comedian, actor, writer, member of Monty Python
Olivia Colman	1974	Actress, comedian
Peter Cook	1937	Comedy writer and performer, proprietor of Private Eye, member of Beyond the Fringe
Joe Craig	1980	Novelist, musician, known for the Jimmy Coates series
John Crommelin-Brown	1888	Schoolmaster, poet, cricketer
Andrew Davidson	1928	Politician
Christie Davies	1941	Sociologist, author
Russell Davies	1946	Journalist, broadcaster, presenter of Brain of Britain
Hugh Dennis	1962	Comedian, actor, writer, satirist, voice-over artist, half of Punt and Dennis
Kate Duchêne	1959	Actor
Kenneth Duffield	1885	Composer, writer
Sarah Dunant	1950	Novelist, journalist, broadcaster, critic
Penny Dwyer	1953	Comedian, actor, writer, metallurgist
Jimmy Edwards	1920	Comedy actor, writer, star of Take It from Here and Whack-O!
Milo Edwards	1993	Comedian, podcaster, writer
Chris England	1961	Writer, actor
Mark Evans	1970	Comedian, actor, writer
Julian Fellowes	1949	Screenwriter, director, actor, novelist, known for Gosford Park and Downton Abbey
Paul Fincham	1959	Composer
Peter Fincham	1956	Television producer and executive, Director of Television at ITV
John Finnemore	1977	Comedy writer and performer
David Firman		Conductor, composer, arranger
Tim Firth	1964	Dramatist, screenwriter, songwriter
John Fiske	1939	Media scholar, cultural theorist
Jason Forbes	1990	Actor, comedian
John Fortune	1939	Comedian, actor, satirist, member of Bremner, Bird and Fortune
Jade Franks		Comedian, actor, writer.
Michael Frayn	1933	Playwright, novelist, known for Noises Off and Copenhagen
Robin French	1978	Playwright, scriptwriter, songwriter
David Frost	1939	Television presenter, interviewer, satirist, star of The Frost Report
Stephen Fry	1957	Comedian, writer, actor, novelist, half of Fry and Laurie, Jeeves in Jeeves and Wooster and presenter of QI
Graeme Garden	1943	Comedy writer and performer, illustrator, member of The Goodies
Bamber Gascoigne	1935	Television presenter, author, known for hosting University Challenge
Mel Giedroyc	1968	Actress, writer, television presenter, half of Mel and Sue
Stefan Golaszewski	1980	Comedian, writer, director, member of Cowards
Murray Gold	1969	Composer for stage, film and television, known for Doctor Who
Alastair Ross Goobey	1945	Investment and pension fund manager
David Gooderson	1941	Actor, writer
Lizbeth Goodman	1964	Chair of Creative Technology Innovation/Full Professor/Director SMARTlab/author, broadcaster-television & virtual reality
Patrick Gowers	1936	Composer
Sam Grabiner	1994	Writer, playwright
Adrian Gray	1993	Comedian, writer, creator of the Forgotten History series on Youtube
Matt Green	1979	Comedian, writer, actor
Germaine Greer	1939	Writer, broadcaster, academic
John Grillo	1942	Actor, playwright
Lawrence Grossmith	1877	Actor
Hasan Al-Habib	1994	Comedian
Peter Haddon	1898	Actor
Nick Hancock	1962	Comedian, actor, television presenter, known for Room 101
Norman Hartnell	1901	Fashion designer
David Hatch	1939	Broadcasting manager, producer of Just a Minute and I'm Sorry I Haven't a Clue
Natalie Haynes	1974	Comedian, writer
Archie Henderson	1994	Comedian, musician known as Jazz Emu
Tony Hendra	1941	Satirist, writer, creator of Spitting Image
Kit Hesketh-Harvey	1957	Comedy writer and performer, half of Kit and The Widow
Nigel Hess	1953	Composer
Donald Hewlett	1920	Actor
Amy Hoggart	1986	Comedian, actor
Tom Hollander	1967	Actor, co-creator and star of Rev.
Matthew Holness	1975	Comedian, co-creator of Garth Marenghi
Alex Horne	1978	Comedian, creator and co-host of Taskmaster
Kenneth Horne	1907	Comedian, businessman, star of Round the Horne
John Hosier	1928	Music educator
Claude Hulbert	1900	Comic actor
Jack Hulbert	1892	Actor
Neil Hudson	1969	Politician, academic, vet
Bella Hull		Comedian
Tristram Hunt	1974	Politician, historian, broadcaster, newspaper columnist
Nicholas Hytner	1956	Film and theatre producer, Director of the National Theatre
Eric Idle	1943	Comedian, actor, writer, songwriter, member of Monty Python
Robert Jackson	1945	Educator, researcher
Clive James	1939	Writer, poet, critic
Jonathan James-Moore	1946	Comedy producer, theatre manager
Peter Jeffrey	1929	Actor
Rufus Jones	1976	Comedy writer and performer, member of Dutch Elm Conservatoire
Simon Jones	1950	Actor
Stephen Joseph	1921	Stage director
Tom Kempinski	1938	Playwright, actor
Jo Kendall	1938	Actress
Tim Key	1976	Comedian, actor, poet, member of Cowards
Paul King	1978	Comedy director, known for The Mighty Boosh
Matt Kirshen	1980	Comedian
Ian Lang	1940	Politician, business executive
George Langworthy		Film director, producer and writer
Hugh Latimer	1913	Actor, toymaker
Hugh Laurie	1959	Comedian, actor, writer, musician, half of Fry and Laurie, Wooster in Jeeves and Wooster and star of House
John Lloyd	1951	Comedy producer and writer, creator of Have I Got News for You and QI
Nicholas Luard	1937	Satirist, travel writer, owner of Private Eye, co-founder of The Establishment
Jonathan Lynn	1943	Comedy writer, actor, director, creator of Yes Minister
Dar Lyon	1898	First-class cricketer, politician, barrister, judge
Graeme MacDonald	1930	Television producer and executive
Alex Mackeith	1991	Comedian, writer, playwright and musical comedian
Ania Magliano	1998	Comedian, writer
John Maples	1943	Politician
Miriam Margolyes	1941	Actress
William Mars-Jones	1915	Barrister, High Court judge
Christopher Martin-Jenkins	1945	Cricket broadcaster and writer
Daniel Massey	1933	Actor, singer
Dan Mazer	1971	Comedian, producer, screenwriter, known for work with Sacha Baron Cohen
Simon McBurney	1957	Actor, writer, director, founder of Complicité
Kevin McCloud	1958	Writer, designer, television presenter
Rory McEwen	1932	Artist
Geoffrey McGivern	1952	Comedy actor
Rory McGrath	1956	Comedian, co-founder of Hat Trick Productions
Ben Miller	1966	Comedian, director, actor, half of Armstrong and Miller
Jonathan Miller	1934	Theatre and opera director, humorist, sculptor, member of Beyond the Fringe
David Mitchell	1974	Comedian, actor, writer, half of Mitchell and Webb
Harry Michell	1991	Writer, director
Nick Mohammed	1980	Comedian, actor, writer
Lucy Montgomery	1975	Comedian, actress, writer
Julian More	1928	Writer
Neil Mullarkey	1961	Comedian, actor, writer, founding member of The Comedy Store Players
Jimmy Mulville	1955	Comedian, writer, television presenter, co-founder of Hat Trick Productions
Simon Munnery	1967	Comedian
Richard Murdoch	1907	Comic actor
Maeve Murphy		Director, screenwriter
Jon Naismith	1965	Comedy producer, creator of The Unbelievable Truth, producer of I'm Sorry I Haven't a Clue
Henry Naylor	1968	Comedy writer and performer, half of Parsons and Naylor
David Nobbs	1935	Comedy writer, creator of the Reggie Perrin series
James Northcote	1987	Actor, producer
Pierre Novellie	1991	Comedian, actor, writer
Trevor Nunn	1940	Theatre and film producer, Director of the National Theatre
Des O'Connor	1972	Cabaret performer, musician, lyricist
Bill Oddie	1941	Comedian, actor, musician, naturalist, television presenter, member of The Goodies
Michael O'Donnell	1928	Journalist, author, broadcaster, physician
John Oliver	1977	Comedian, host of Last Week Tonight with John Oliver, former correspondent of The Daily Show
William Osborne	1960	Barrister, screenwriter, author
Richard Osman	1970	Producer, Creative Director of Endemol UK, co-presenter of Pointless, writer
John Pardoe	1934	Politician, businessman
Andy Parsons	1967	Comedian, comedy writer, half of Parsons and Naylor
Harold Perkin	1926	Social historian, Emeritus Professor of History, Northwestern University, Illinois
Sue Perkins	1969	Comedian, actress, writer, television presenter, half of Mel and Sue
Simon Phipps	1921	Bishop
Juliette Pochin	1971	Singer, composer, producer
Herbert Charles Pollitt	1871	Patron of the arts, female impersonator
Steve Punt	1962	Comedian, actor, writer, half of Punt and Dennis
Jan Ravens	1958	Actress, impressionist
Leo Reich	1998	Comedian
Griff Rhys Jones	1953	Comedian, actor, writer, co-founder of Talkback, half of Alas Smith and Jones
Blake Ritson	1980	Actor, director, writer
John-Luke Roberts	1985	Comedy writer and performer, known for Spats
Ellen Robertson	1992	Actress, comedian, member of Britney comedy-duo
Rosa Robson	1992	Actress, comedian
Antony Root		Television executive, producer
Josie Rourke	1976	Film and theatre director
Salman Rushdie	1947	Booker Prize-winning novelist
Joanna Scanlan	1961	Actor, writer
Tanya Seghatchian	1968	Film producer, former Head of the Development Fund at the UK Film Council and British Film Institute
Peter Shaffer	1926	Playwright, known for Equus and Amadeus
Ahir Shah	1990	Comedian
Will Sharpe	1986	Actor, director, writer, known for The White Lotus
Charles Shaughnessy	1955	Actor
Paul Shearer		Actor, writer
Martin Short	1943	Author and documentary producer
Emma Sidi	1991	Comedian, actress, writer
Lucie Shorthouse		Actor
John Shrapnel	1942	Actor
Richard Sisson	1957	Pianist, composer, half of Kit and The Widow
Adrian Slade	1936	Politician
Julian Slade	1930	Musical theatre composer, known for Salad Days
Tony Slattery	1959	Comedian, actor
Ali Smith	1962	Novelist, short story writer, journalist, known for Hotel World
Michael Marshall Smith	1965	Novelist, screenwriter, short story writer
Gregory Snegoff	1955	Voice-over artist, writer, director
Sarah Solemani	1982	Writer, actress
Dan Stevens	1982	Actor
Richard Stilgoe	1943	Songwriter, lyricist, musician
Frog Stone		Writer, actor
John Stroud	1955	Television director and producer
Adrian Sturges	1976	Film producer
William Sutcliffe	1971	Novelist
Jonny Sweet	1985	Comedian, writer
Edward Taylor	1931	Comedy writer, radio producer, creator of The Men from the Ministry
Joe Thomas	1983	Comedian, actor, writer, known for The Inbetweeners
Emma Thompson	1959	Comedian, actress, screenwriter
Robert Thorogood	1972	Screenwriter, novelist
Sandi Toksvig	1958	Comedian, writer, former presenter of The News Quiz, presenter of QI
Peter Tranchell	1922	composer, Precentor of Gonville and Caius College, Cambridge and Lecturer in Music, University of Cambridge
David Tyler	1961	TV and radio producer (aka David Meek)
Tom Vernon	1939	Broadcaster, writer
Richard Vranch	1959	Comedian, actor, musician, founding member of The Comedy Store Players
Nicola Walker	1970	Actress, known for Spooks and Unforgotten
Ian Wallace	1919	Opera singer, actor, broadcaster
Phil Wang	1990	Comedian
Hank Wangford	1940	Country music singer
Mark Warman	1961	Conductor, musical director, composer
Alan Warren	1932	Priest, author
Mark Watson	1980	Comedian, novelist, radio presenter
Robert Webb	1972	Comedian, actor, writer, half of Mitchell and Webb
Ed Weeks	1980	Comedian, actor, writer
Bob Wellings	1934	Television presenter
Liam Williams	1988	Comedian, actor, writer, director
Christopher Winchester	1972	Actor, writer, musical comedian
Mark Wing-Davey	1948	Actor, director
Sophie Winkleman	1980	Actress
David Wolstencroft	1969	Scriptwriter, creator of Spooks
Lloyd Woolf	1981	Actor, writer
Richard Wordsworth	1915	Character actor
Maury Yeston	1945	Broadway and Film Composer/lyricist, musicologist, known for Nine, Titanic, Grand Hotel
Martin Young	1947	Television reporter, interviewer, co-creator of Rough Justice
