= James Griffiths (director) =

British TV and film director

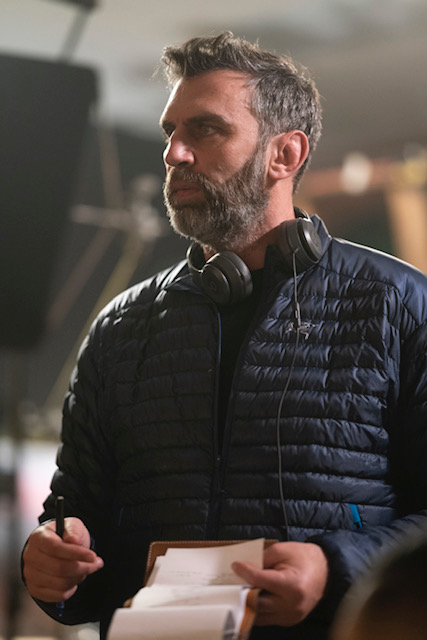
- Born: United Kingdom
- Occupation(s): Television director, film director
- Years active: 2004–present
- Children: 2

James Griffiths is a British television and film director and producer. Griffiths served as a producer on A Million Little Things, Black-ish, and its Freeform spinoff, Grown-ish. He also directed and executive produced the ABC series, Stumptown.

== Career ==
Griffiths began his career directing music videos, and later began directing television in the United Kingdom. Griffiths directed every episode of Free Agents and the first season of Episodes.

Griffiths executive produced The Mayor and directed the pilot episode of Cooper Barrett's Guide to Surviving Life and Up All Night. All this came after Griffiths directed his first feature film Cuban Fury in 2014. Previously, his 2006 short film The One and Only Herb McGwyer Plays Wallis Island premiered at the Toronto Shorts Festival, earning the Best Short Film award at the Edinburgh International Film Festival and a BAFTA nomination.

In 2019, Griffiths renewed his contract with ABC Studios for another two years, which includes a development contract with his own production company, Fee Fi Fo Films.

In 2025, Griffiths released The Ballad of Wallis Island, a feature film adaptation of The One and Only Herb McGwyer Plays Wallis Island. The film stars Tim Key, Tom Basden, and Carey Mulligan.

== Filmography ==
Feature Films
Year	Title
2014	Cuban Fury
2025	The Ballad of Wallis Island

Television Films
Year	Title
2010	Royal Wedding
2016	Charity Case
2020	Delilah
