= Cowards (comedy troupe) =

British comedy act

- Notable work: Cowards (radio series); Cowards (television series)

Comedy career
- Years active: 2004–2009
- Medium: Television, theatre, radio
- Genre: Sketch comedy
- Members: Tom Basden; Stefan Golaszewski; Tim Key; Lloyd Woolf
- Former members: Rick Edwards; Alex Horne; Mark Watson

Cowards are a British four-man comedy act, composed of Tim Key, Stefan Golaszewski, Tom Basden and Lloyd Woolf. The group has created eponymous radio and TV series of their sketch comedy.

== History ==
The Cowards met at Cambridge University's Footlights Dramatic Club where they worked together. Basden, Golaszewski, and Woolf performed in a show directed by Key and Mark Watson. It later emerged that Key was not studying at Cambridge University and that he had misled the society when auditioning. This was discovered when he got into the tour show Far Too Happy but the Footlights agreed to "keep up the charade" until the Edinburgh Festival Fringe. In Far Too Happy, Key performed alongside Mark Watson and Sophie Winkleman and they were nominated for the Perrier Comedy Award for Best Newcomer. Key later described the period as "life-changing".

Basden, Golaszewski, Key, and Woolf moved to London and started working together as Cowards. Cowards initially involved Rick Edwards, Alex Horne, and Mark Watson but they agreed that the group would not work as they had different styles. Cowards began working as a four-piece group in October 2004, writing and performing new material each month. In 2005 and 2006, they had sell-out runs at the Edinburgh Festival Fringe, performing at the Pleasance.

== Radio ==
The group first appeared on radio with a BBC Radio 1 show called The Milk Run which incorporated some Cowards material. As a result of working on The Milk Run, they were asked to do a one-off special, which led to a Cowards series being commissioned. Their first, six episode, radio series was broadcast on BBC Radio 4, beginning on 17 April 2007, and a four episode second series was broadcast in autumn 2008. The show was well received, with the British Comedy Guide describing it as "very funny" - though also stating that it suffered from "some less amusing filler". Both series have since been released as CD Audiobooks by BBC Worldwide.

== Television ==
=== BBC Three ===
Cowards took over the BBC Three website on 25 January 2007 and built their own "comedy world". Presented as living inside the website for a six-week duration, Cowards would walk on to the screen and encourage visitors to click through to their comedy area. In that area users could view a range of pre-filmed sketches and animation, as well as 'overhead' sketches filmed to give the impression the act are 'living' on the site. As part of the BBC 360-degree development strategy the material was used as a pilot for a TV series. However, BBC Three decided not to commission a series.

=== BBC Four ===
In early 2008, BBC Four commissioned a three episode TV series, produced by Angel Eye Media. The series (also called Cowards) was shot with director Steve Bendelack and was broadcast in January 2009. The show was critically acclaimed, and received a nomination for a BAFTA Scotland Award in the "Best Entertainment" category. As a result of the television series, Esquire named the Cowards on its list of "60 Brilliant Brits Shaping 2009".

== Future ==
While the Cowards have not appeared together for several years, all four have continued to write and perform. Basden and Key often perform together as sketch duo Freeze! as well as being resident musician and poet on Mark Watson's radio series Mark Watson Makes the World Substantially Better. Basden has written several plays, including Party which was performed at the Edinburgh Festival Fringe in 2009, winning the Fringe First award and later being adapted into a well-received radio series . Key's solo show The Slutcracker won the Edinburgh Comedy Award for Best Show in 2009.

As a director, Golaszewski has won the Edinburgh Comedy Award for Best Newcomer twice: in 2007 for Basden's solo show Won't Say Anything and in 2009 for Jonny Sweet's show Mostly About Arthur. Golaszewski has also written a BBC Three sitcom called Him & Her, starring Russell Tovey and Sarah Solemani, as well as writing a play Sex with a Stranger that was staged in the West End in early 2012. Woolf has performed in BBC Three series The Wrong Door, the short films Nightwalking and How Much for My Brother?, and various television adverts. More recently, Woolf has co-written Parents, a six-part sitcom which aired on Sky1 in summer 2012.
