= Marriage (TV series) =

British television series

- Genre: Drama
- Created by: Stefan Golaszewski
- Written by: Stefan Golaszewski
- Directed by: Stefan Golaszewski
- Starring: Sean Bean; Nicola Walker
- Country of origin: United Kingdom
- Original language: English
- No. of series: 1
- No. of episodes: 4

Production
- Executive producers: Stefan Golaszewski; Tommy Bulfin; George Faber; Richard Laxton; Beth Willis
- Producer: Lyndsay Robinson
- Cinematography: Ali Asad
- Editor: Simon Reglar
- Production companies: All3Media; The Forge; The Money Men

Original release
- Network: BBC One
- Release: 14 August – 22 August 2022

Marriage is a 2022 British television drama series, starring Nicola Walker and Sean Bean as a married couple in a long-term domestic relationship. It was created, written and directed by Stefan Golaszewski. The four-part series opened on 14 August 2022 on BBC One. It was simultaneously made available in full to stream, on BBC iPlayer.

== Cast ==
- Sean Bean as Ian, Emma's husband who has recently been made redundant
- Nicola Walker as Emma, Ian's wife who is a solicitor
- Chantelle Alle as Jessica, Ian and Emma's adoptive daughter and a singer
- Henry Lloyd-Hughes as Jamie, Emma's boss
- Jack Holden as Adam, Jessica's abusive boyfriend and a record producer
- James Bolam as Gerry, Emma's father
- Makir Ahmed as Mike, Emma's colleague
- Kath Hughes as Claire, Emma's colleague
- Ella Augustin as Maxine, an employee at the local leisure centre
- Hector Hewer as Kieran, an employee at the local leisure centre
- Shona McHugh as Emily, an employee at Jamie's company who is on work experience
- Kemal Sylvester as Paul, Emma's brother
- Miles Barrow as Mark, a restaurant employee who befriends Jessica

== Production ==
In September 2021, it was announced that the BBC had commissioned Golaszewski's new drama, starring Walker and Bean. It was a co-production between The Forge and The Money Men, in association with All3Media International.

The theme tune is "Partita for 8 Voices: No 1, Allemande", an a cappella work by the American composer Caroline Shaw.

== Episode list ==
| No. | Title | Directed by | Written by | Original release date | U.K. viewers (millions) |
|---|---|---|---|---|---|
| 1 | "1.1" | Stefan Golaszewski | Stefan Golaszewski | 14 August 2022 | 5.44 |
| 2 | "1.2" | Stefan Golaszewski | Stefan Golaszewski | 15 August 2022 | 3.32 |
| 3 | "1.3" | Stefan Golaszewski | Stefan Golaszewski | 21 August 2022 | 2.93 |
| 4 | "1.4" | Stefan Golaszewski | Stefan Golaszewski | 22 August 2022 | <(2.32) |

== Reception ==
The series received mostly very good reviews from critics, and mixed reviews from viewers. The Telegraph praised the first episode and gave it five out of five stars. Ben East of Metro, similarly, praised the first episode and gave it four stars. Rebecca Nicholson for The Guardian gave the first episode four out of five stars, remarking, 'There is a pitch-perfect realism to the way these characters talk without really saying anything, then put across what they really mean while saying nothing at all. It’s so cleverly done.'

By contrast, Nick Hilton, writing for The Independent, gave Marriage two out of five stars, adding that the show would "bore you to tears".
