= All Bar Luke =

BBC Radio 4 comedy series

All Bar Luke is a radio series written and performed by comedian and poet Tim Key and produced by Seb Barwell. It was first broadcast on BBC Radio 4 in 2007.

== Description ==
All Bar Luke consists of 15-minute monologues, where the voice heard is that of Luke Walsall. Luke never addresses the audience directly, but the narrative is built from overhearing his side of conversations with other people, including his mum, his friends and his brother.

All Bar Luke has been described by the writer as "...the chronicles of a hapless divboy, condemned to live on the outskirts of a morally bankrupt friendship group."

The theme tune for All Bar Luke is "She's a Rainbow" by The Rolling Stones.

== Reviews ==
All Bar Luke received a review from Zoe Williams in The Guardian in which she commended the writing and delivery, describing the writing as "terribly acute, and of course very funny".
