= The One and Only Herb McGwyer Plays Wallis Island =

- Directed by: James Griffiths
- Written by: Tim Key; Tom Basden
- Produced by: Charlie Henderson
- Starring: Tim Key; Tom Basden
- Edited by: Art Jones
- Music by: Tom Basden
- Release date: 2007
- Running time: 25 minutes
- Country: United Kingdom
- Language: English

The One and Only Herb McGwyer Plays Wallis Island is a 2007 British short comedy film, directed by James Griffiths, and written by and starring Tim Key and Tom Basden. It was nominated for a 2008 BAFTA Award for Best Short Film, and won the UK Film Council Award for Best British Short Film at the Edinburgh International Film Festival.

The short film was adapted into a feature film, The Ballad of Wallis Island, directed by Griffiths and starring Key, Basden and Carey Mulligan, which was released in 2025.

== Plot summary ==
Lottery winner Charles Heath (Tim Key) pays folk singer Herb McGwyer (Tom Basden) to visit his private island and perform for him for a fee of half a million pounds. Isolated from the world, the jaded singer's passion for music is slowly reignited.
