= Plebs (TV series) =

- Genre: Sitcom
- Created by: Sam Leifer; Tom Basden
- Written by: Sam Leifer; Tom Basden; Matt Morgan (one episode)
- Directed by: Sam Leifer
- Starring: Tom Rosenthal; Joel Fry; Ryan Sampson; Jonathan Pointing; Tom Basden; Ellie Taylor; Karl Theobald; Doon Mackichan; Sophie Colquhoun; Lydia Rose Bewley; Adrian Scarborough; Tom Davis; Neil Stuke; Bella Dayne; Laura Elsworthy; Maximilien Seweryn; Maureen Lipman; Kim Wall
- Theme music composer: Oliver Julian
- Country of origin: United Kingdom
- Original language: English
- No. of series: 5 (+1 special)
- No. of episodes: 39

Production
- Executive producers: Caroline Leddy; Sam Leifer
- Producer: Teddy Leifer
- Production locations: Nu Boyana Studios, Bulgaria
- Running time: 25 minutes
- Production company: Rise Films

Original release
- Network: ITV2; ITVX (film only)
- Release: 25 March 2013 – 8 December 2022

Plebs is a British sitcom broadcast on ITV2. It was first broadcast in March 2013, and was produced by Tom Basden, Caroline Leddy, Sam Leifer and Teddy Leifer. It stars Tom Rosenthal, Ryan Sampson, Joel Fry (series 1–3), and Jonathan Pointing (from series 4), who play young residents of ancient Rome (plebs were ordinary non-patrician citizens of Rome). The show ran for five series between 2013 and 2019, with a feature-length special in 2022.

The show makes comical use of anachronistically modern parlance and concepts in a historical setting. It predominantly uses ska/rocksteady music, during all the opening and closing titles, and during each episode as background music.

== Premise ==
The show initially follows new arrivals from the provinces Marcus, Stylax, and their slave Grumio, as they deal with daily life in ancient Rome. Marcus and Stylax work in the scriptorium of a grain company with their manager, Flavia, the water-carrier Aurelius, and communications officer Claudius. They live next door to two attractive young British women: Cynthia, an aspiring actress, and her slave Metella, with their unscrupulous landlord a constant thorn in their sides.

The third series saw the departure of Cynthia and Metella, and the introduction of Delphine, a young woman from Gaul, who begins a relationship with Marcus.

The fourth series replaces Stylax, who is crushed to death, with a new character, Jason, who dropped the block that killed him. Marcus is fired from the scriptorium, and Aurelius moves into a leading role, and the four main characters endeavour to run a bar in a renovated public toilet. Meanwhile, Marcus pursues an ambiguous relationship with Gloria, who owns the laundry next door.

== Production ==
=== Production history ===
A pilot episode was shot in early 2012. At the time, ITV2 was looking to expand its comedy, as its only original comedy series was panel show Celebrity Juice. In August 2012, the first series of six episodes was commissioned. Co-writer Tom Basden joked that the show's name would be more widely understood due to Plebgate, a September 2012 scandal in which politician Andrew Mitchell called police officers "plebs". The first series was broadcast between 25 March and 22 April 2013, and in June, a second series was ordered. It aired between 22 September and 3 November 2014, and ran for eight episodes, which became the length of all subsequent series.

Plebs was renewed for a third series in March 2015, which aired from 4 April and 16 May 2016. Filming of a fourth series began in April 2017, and it was screened between 9 April and 21 May 2018. A fifth series was commissioned in August 2018, and ran from 30 September to 11 November 2019.

On 30 April 2020, it was confirmed the series would end with a feature-length special. Production was delayed due to the COVID-19 pandemic, and the special premiered on ITVX on 8 December 2022.

=== Filming ===
Plebs was filmed on a Roman set at Nu Boyana Film Studios in Bulgaria. Between the first and second series, the set was expanded for the big-budget films Thermae Romae and The Legend of Hercules, and their structures were retained for use in filming Plebs. Filming was sometimes affected by the issue of stray dogs in Sofia. Historian Mary Beard was an advisor, specialising in the lives of ordinary people of Rome. Producers Sam and Teddy Leifer, both holders of Classics degrees, were apprehensive about moving the scene of a trial indoors due to poor weather, as Roman trials were held outside. The Leifers are Jewish, and were disappointed that the series premiered on Passover Seder night. Sam Leifer told The Jewish Chronicle in 2013 that the character Marcus displayed stereotypically Jewish traits of being "neurotic, bookish, lovelorn", and that they had future plans for episodes including ancient Jews.

== Cast ==
Only main and recurring characters are listed.

Character	Appearances					
Character	1	2	3	4	5	Soldiers of Rome
Marcus Phillipus Valerius Gallo	Tom Rosenthal	Tom Rosenthal	Tom Rosenthal	Tom Rosenthal	Tom Rosenthal	Tom Rosenthal
Stylax Rufus Eurysaces	Joel Fry	Joel Fry	Joel Fry			
Grumio	Ryan Sampson	Ryan Sampson	Ryan Sampson	Ryan Sampson	Ryan Sampson	Ryan Sampson
Aurelius Leifer ("Water Man" / "Water Boy")	Tom Basden	Tom Basden	Tom Basden	Tom Basden	Tom Basden	Tom Basden
Landlord	Karl Theobald	Karl Theobald	Karl Theobald	Karl Theobald	Karl Theobald	Karl Theobald
Flavia	Doon Mackichan	Doon Mackichan	Doon Mackichan	Doon Mackichan		
Davus		Tom Davis	Tom Davis	Tom Davis		
Landlady			Maureen Lipman	Maureen Lipman	Maureen Lipman	
Jason Brindisi				Jonathan Pointing	Jonathan Pointing	Jonathan Pointing
Gloria				Ellie Taylor	Ellie Taylor	
Cynthia Cogidubna	Sophie Colquhoun	Sophie Colquhoun				
Metella	Lydia Rose Bewley	Lydia Rose Bewley				
Claudius	Adrian Scarborough	Adrian Scarborough				
Cornelius		Neil Stuke				
Delphine			Bella Dayne			
Maya			Laura Elsworthy			
Gregory			Maximilien Seweryn			
Paeon			Kim Wall			

== Episodes ==
=== Series overview ===
Series	Episodes	Originally released	
Series	Episodes	First released	Last released
1	6	25 March 2013	22 April 2013
2	8	22 September 2014	3 November 2014
3	8	4 April 2016	16 May 2016
4	8	9 April 2018	21 May 2018
5	8	30 September 2019	11 November 2019
Soldiers of Rome		8 December 2022	

=== Series 1 (2013) ===
No. overall	No. in series	Title	Directed by	Written by	Original release date	UK viewers (millions)
1	1	"The Orgy"	Sam Leifer	Sam Leifer & Tom Basden	25 March 2013	1.16
Flatmates Marcus and Stylax are pleased when two attractive young British women, aspiring actress Cynthia and her slave Metella, move into the flat next door. Marcus offers to show Cynthia around the city, but his attempts to form a relationship with her are ruined when he tries to invite her to an orgy. Meanwhile, Stylax arranges to attend the party with their boss, Flavia, but discovers that he is part of the entertainment.
2	2	"The Gladiator"	Sam Leifer	Sam Leifer & Tom Basden	25 March 2013	0.94
Cynthia has a new gladiator boyfriend Cassius (Danny Dyer). However, she wrongly assumes him to be an actor and the fatal fights to be simulated. He impresses everyone except jealous Marcus, who arranges with their sleazy landlord to have him put up against a formidable opponent from Germania in his next bout. In the meantime, Cynthia breaks up with Cassius when she finds out that he kills people, but Marcus is unable to call off the fight. Cassius is unhappy about his relationship ending and is decapitated by his opponent.
3	3	"The Erotic Vase"	Sam Leifer	Sam Leifer & Tom Basden	1 April 2013	0.80
It is Marcus and Stylax's slave Grumio's birthday and he receives an erotic vase featuring a girl that the boys think looks like Cynthia at a certain angle. Marcus, under pressure from the girls to be nicer to his slave, suggests they swap roles for the day. Grumio takes advantage of the situation by blackmailing Marcus, threatening to tell Cynthia about the vase. Meanwhile, Stylax hangs out with his first cousin Lucretia (Naomi Bentley), who is also his sexual partner. Marcus and his landlord strongly disapprove of the relationship, considering it to be incest, so he ends it.
4	4	"The Herpes Cat"	Sam Leifer	Sam Leifer & Tom Basden	8 April 2013	0.69
To endear himself to Cynthia, Marcus befriends a mangy cat she has rescued from the courtyard, but the cat is accidentally killed. Stylax is suffering from a disturbing itch and visits a sexual health clinic, where he falls for an attractive young nurse. Flavia recommends an ointment for his condition. Grumio buys a lottery ticket from the landlord.
5	5	"Bananae"	Sam Leifer	Sam Leifer & Tom Basden	15 April 2013	Under 0.59
Mass immigration from Thrace puts the boys into contact with a Thracian lodger, Irina, and a new exotic fruit, the banana. Meanwhile, Marcus has an unfortunate encounter with an aggressive elderly war veteran (Brian Murphy) who is collecting for charity. Irina, far from being the useful addition to the household that Stylax anticipated, has brought along her husband, and yet more Thracian couples turn up, overcrowding the apartment. The 'bananae' catch on and become a craze with Marcus' fellow workers. When Marcus is approached again by the veteran, he fights back and injures him, and has to avoid the veteran's friends who are looking for revenge. Grumio points the old soldiers in the direction of Irina's husband. The Thracians flee Rome, leaving behind a pineapple.
6	6	"Saturnalia"	Sam Leifer	Sam Leifer & Tom Basden	22 April 2013	Under 0.66
During the festival of Saturnalia, Marcus hopes the midnight celebration is the perfect opportunity to make a move on Cynthia, but she thinks she is cursed and does not feel like coming out. They think they have struck lucky when Flavia invites them to her party along with Aurelius the water carrier, until all three discover that they are expected to wait on the real guests. To escape in time for the public festivities, they rig the water clock so that Flavia thinks it is already midnight. Meanwhile, Grumio goes on a mission to make sure that sacrificial meat does not go to waste. Befriended by a priest, he thinks his luck is in until he discovers he is being taken to Cyprus for castration.

=== Series 2 (2014) ===
Series two began on ITV2 on Monday 22 September 2014 at 10 pm with a series-opener double bill. Rosenthal's father Jim Rosenthal appeared in the first episode as a commentator on a chariot race.

No. overall	No. in series	Title	Directed by	Written by	Original release date	UK viewers (millions)
7	1	"The Chariot"	Sam Leifer	Sam Leifer & Tom Basden	22 September 2014	1.09
Having won 100 denarii each through Stylax's betting on a chariot race, he and Marcus have very different ideas on how to spend the money. Marcus, naturally, wants to spend it on Cynthia, whilst Stylax prefers a more laddish approach. After being rejected for a date with Cynthia, Marcus asks the next-door neighbour out.
8	2	"The Best Men"	Sam Leifer	Sam Leifer & Tom Basden	22 September 2014	0.87
Surprisingly, Aurelius is getting married. Even more surprisingly, he invites his "best mate" Marcus to be his best man. Reluctant to say the least, Marcus plans a night on the cheap, avoiding the hottest club in town.
9	3	"The Baby"	Sam Leifer	Sam Leifer & Tom Basden	29 September 2014	0.78
Grumio finds an abandoned baby at the bins, which he decides to parent and starts to develop affection towards her despite Marcus wanting her out of the house. Stylax uses it to get closer to a young wet nurse. Marcus doesn't want to see Cynthia's one-woman play.
10	4	"The Patron"	Sam Leifer	Sam Leifer & Tom Basden	6 October 2014	0.74
Marcus is unwilling to pay for the medicine that Grumio needs, as he uses his slave's sickness to get closer to Cynthia. A nobleman (James Fleet) shows an interest in Stylax's charioteering career, but seems too good to be true.
11	5	"The New Slave"	Sam Leifer	Sam Leifer & Tom Basden	13 October 2014	0.84
At an auction, Marcus and Stylax purchase a new slave (Tim Key) who might be a psychopath. Guest: David Schneider as Agorix
12	6	"The Candidate"	Sam Leifer	Sam Leifer & Tom Basden	20 October 2014	0.57
Marcus and Stylax get involved in the campaign of Victor of the Gracchi (Simon Callow), a local politician; Grumio takes up with Victor's opponent
13	7	"The Phallus"	Sam Leifer	Sam Leifer & Tom Basden	27 October 2014	0.77
The boys bump into a former schoolmate, Fabianus (Naz Osmanoglu), who is now a lawyer. Stylax fails to connect with an old flame, Cordelia (Poppy Drayton).
14	8	"The Race"	Sam Leifer	Sam Leifer & Tom Basden	3 November 2014	0.94
Marcus and Stylax need to raise 3,000 denarii to keep the girls from being deported. Grumio discovers that the landlord is in prison

=== Series 3 (2016) ===
Series three began on ITV2 on Monday 4 April 2016 at 10 pm, with the broadcast of "The Beasts" and "Justin Junior".

No. overall	No. in series	Title	Directed by	Written by	Original release date	UK viewers (millions)
15	1	"The Beasts"	Sam Leifer	Sam Leifer & Tom Basden	4 April 2016	1.06
The Games are taking place in the city and the boys are desperate for tickets. Marcus meets Delphine (Bella Dayne), a fiery activist from Gaul who is later revealed to have an interesting past, while Grumio clashes with Landlady (Maureen Lipman), the mother of their missing landlord.
16	2	"Justin Junior"	Sam Leifer	Sam Leifer & Tom Basden	4 April 2016	1.04
Grumio's estranged father returns, prompting a father-son reconciliation.
17	3	"The Vestal"	Sam Leifer	Sam Leifer & Tom Basden	11 April 2016	1.07
Marcus' parents are staying with the boys, prompting Marcus to attempt to hide Delphine from them. Stylax becomes obsessed with a Vestal Virgin. Grumio begins a business endeavour.
18	4	"The Cupid"	Sam Leifer	Sam Leifer & Tom Basden	18 April 2016	1.11
After being accused of being uncultured by Delphine, the boys take their first steps into the theatre where Grumio wins the role of Cupid.
19	5	"The Crime Wave"	Sam Leifer	Sam Leifer & Tom Basden	25 April 2016	0.91
Marcus, Stylax and Delphine take a self-defence course; Grumio begins dating a cake maker.
20	6	"Jugball"	Sam Leifer	Sam Leifer & Tom Basden	2 May 2016	1.03
The son "Ramases" (Nathan Clarke) of the owner of the office where Marcus and Stylax work visits on work experience; before long Flavia is fired and Marcus finds himself in charge. Stylax invents a new ball game.
21	7	"The New Master"	Sam Leifer	Matt Morgan	9 May 2016	1.15
Grumio is sent to work for another master after injuring his slave, where he then prompts a rebellion. Marcus wants Stylax and Delphine to get on better and gets more than he bargained for.
22	8	"The Weatherist"	Sam Leifer	Sam Leifer & Tom Basden	16 May 2016	1.10
When a Weatherist "Strabo" (David Bamber) moves in next door and predicts an earthquake, Marcus and Stylax use the opportunity to improve their love lives. Grumio also plans to take advantage of the impending quake when he is denied a dish of curry.

=== Series 4 (2018) ===
Series four began filming in September 2017. The first two episodes aired on 9 April 2018 on ITV2.

No. overall	No. in series	Title	Directed by	Written by	Original release date	UK viewers (millions)
23	1	"The Accident"	Sam Leifer	Sam Leifer & Tom Basden	9 April 2018	1.19
Stylax is crushed by a slab and unemployed Marcus tries to blackmail builder Crassus (Robert Lindsay) for compensation, but ends up serving his evictions. Aurelius moves in as flatmate while Grumio and ladies' man Jason are in the doghouse. They later burgle Crassus' home for valuable art.
24	2	"The Critic"	Sam Leifer	Sam Leifer & Tom Basden	9 April 2018	1.06
Marcus spends his savings to open the Crown and Toga pub, and agrees to Grumio's avant-garde menu to appease food critic Athena (Annette Badland). They later forge an unprecedented review and enjoy brief popularity. Meanwhile, Jason tries to connect with the waitresses he hires.
25	3	"The Marathon"	Sam Leifer	Sam Leifer & Tom Basden	16 April 2018	1.20
Aurelius is running in a charity marathon and Jason sabotages him to win a bet. Grumio is mistaken for being mentally disadvantaged and Marcus tries to scam money through a charitable foundation, but Grumio soon takes advantage.
26	4	"The Satirist"	Sam Leifer	Sam Leifer & Tom Basden	23 April 2018	0.98
Marcus begins a relationship with stand-up comedian Minerva (Aisling Bea) but becomes insecure when she reflects on their relationship at pub shows. Jason, Aurelius and Grumio start a house band.
27	5	"Lupercalia"	Sam Leifer	Sam Leifer & Tom Basden	30 April 2018	0.92
Marcus receives mixed signals when Gloria asks him out for dinner on Lupercalia. Jason tries to break up couples for rebound sex, while Grumio accidentally swallows a customer's engagement ring.
28	6	"The Bath House"	Sam Leifer	Sam Leifer & Tom Basden	7 May 2018	0.90
The lads extend a "free session" at a bath house for access to great food, a yoga instructor, and business investors.
29	7	"The Accountant"	Sam Leifer	Sam Leifer & Tom Basden	14 May 2018	0.74
Threatened with liquidation for the bar's tax debt, Marcus woos a Jewess to do their accounting. Jason takes a barber's tab in hair styling. And Grumio attempts to end their money troubles through snail racing.
30	8	"Beer"	Sam Leifer	Sam Leifer & Tom Basden	21 May 2018	0.82
The Crown and Toga lose business to a Germanian pub, and try to steal their recipe for beer. Meanwhile, Marcus runs afoul of an incompetent fire brigade.

=== Series 5 (2019) ===
No. overall	No. in series	Title	Directed by	Written by	Original release date	UK viewers (millions)
31	1	"The Vineyard"	Sam Leifer	Sam Leifer & Tom Basden	30 September 2019	N/A
The boys set off on a wine-buying trip to Tuscany, but when their cart has a collision on the road they are forced to pull in to a nearby village.
32	2	"The Paedos"	Sam Leifer	Sam Leifer & Tom Basden	30 September 2019	N/A
Marcus offers to tutor Gloria's teenage son Barney, while Grumio is mistaken for a schoolboy and soon finds himself recruited into the under-14s boxing team.
33	3	"The Banquet"	Sam Leifer	Sam Leifer & Tom Basden	7 October 2019	N/A
The boys gatecrash a posh banquet having received an invitation by mistake. Once there, Marcus attempts to win favour with their host Senator Varus (David Calder), while Jason seduces bored aristocrat Rufina (Amanda Holden). Banished to eat with the other slaves, Grumio overhears what he thinks might be a poison plot.
34	4	"The Grumbrella"	Sam Leifer	Sam Leifer & Tom Basden	14 October 2019	N/A
There's a heatwave in Rome and Marcus has invested in an exciting new gimmick for the bar – ice. Grumio develops an innovation of his own in the form of a hat-parasol hybrid, which attracts the attention of wealthy entrepreneur Severus (Phil Davis). Jason and Aurelius both join male escort agency the Knights of Eros.
35	5	"The Hooligans"	Sam Leifer	Sam Leifer & Tom Basden	21 October 2019	N/A
The boys attempt to infiltrate a local firm of chariot hooligans in order to get some big drinkers into the bar.
36	6	"The Dig"	Sam Leifer	Sam Leifer & Tom Basden	28 October 2019	N/A
The boys begin an archaeological dig in their bar after Grumio unearths an old brooch while sitting on the toilet. They try to keep their activity a secret but others cotton on and when a professor of archaeology, Daedalus Greco (Tony Robinson) goes missing, the boys are brought in for questioning as they paid him a recent visit.
37	7	"The New Flat"	Sam Leifer	Sam Leifer & Tom Basden	4 November 2019	N/A
The boys face uncertainty when their landlord evicts them without notice from their flat. Marcus hopes his parents, who are visiting for the weekend, will help him onto the property ladder, but his dad has other plans for their savings. Meanwhile, Jason's smooth-talking lands him a job as an estate agent.
38	8	"The Wedding"	Sam Leifer	Sam Leifer & Tom Basden	11 November 2019	N/A
Jason's brother Darius (Kevin Bishop) is getting married and Marcus desperately wants to hire out the Crown and Toga for the occasion, while Grumio offers his services as wedding planner. But their plans are threatened when they find out that Darius is a serial jilter. Elsewhere, Marcus clashes with their lazy postman.

=== Special ===
No. overall	No. in series	Title	Directed by	Written by	ITVX release date	ITV2 airdate	UK viewers (millions) (Note: Excludes viewership prior to linear broadcast through ITVX and any on non-TV devices.)
39	1	"Plebs: Soldiers of Rome"	Sam Leifer	Sam Leifer & Tom Basden	8 December 2022	22 May 2023	0.294
Hoping to win respect, romance and discounts at participating restaurants, the boys sign up to the army during peace time but when war's declared they're sent to fight on the front line for a cause they don't believe in. Unsurprisingly they won't return as conquering heroes or cover themselves in glory.

== Home releases ==
Name	Region 2	Discs
Series One	29 April 2013	1
Series Two	5 January 2015	1
Series Three	18 July 2016	1
Series Four	4 June 2018	1
Series Five	2 December 2019	1

== International broadcast ==
Plebs premiered in Australia on 8 January 2015 on ABC2 and is available for streaming on ABC iview. It is available to stream in the United States on Freevee.

== Reception ==
James Donaghy of The Guardian praised the series for including relatable characters and compared Marcus and Stylax to best-friend duos in present-set sitcoms such as The Inbetweeners and Peep Show. Oxford historian Anna Clark noted inaccuracies in some depictions of Roman society, but praised the depiction of obscene graffiti, an area that she was researching. The University of Warwick website considered that the humour came from transferring modern behaviour to the ancient world. Time Out compared the relaxed adherence to historical accuracy to the works of Mel Brooks. The series has been likened to Blackadder for its depiction of characters attempting to rise in society, and Grumio has been compared to its character Baldrick for his ineptitude and deadpan delivery.

== Awards ==
The show has been nominated for and won several awards throughout its run, with two notable wins being the Royal Television Society Award for Best Scripted Comedy in 2014, and the award for Best New Comedy Programme at the British Comedy Awards in 2013.

At the Royal Television Society Awards in 2014, nominations also went to Sam Leifer and Tom Basden for Best Comedy Writing, and Ryan Sampson for Best Comedy Performance. In 2013, Oli Julian was nominated for an RTS Craft and Design Award for Best Music and Original Title Music.

In 2014, Doon Mackichan was nominated for Best Female Performance in a Comedy Role at the British Academy Television Awards (BAFTAs), for her role as Flavia in Plebs. Sam Leifer and Teddy Leifer of Rise Films were also nominated for the Breakthrough Talent Award at the British Academy Television Craft Awards that year.

In 2016, the show received nominations for Best Comedy Series at the TV Choice Awards and for Best TV Situation Comedy at the Writers' Guild of Great Britain Awards. Series 4 of Plebs was nominated for Best Sitcom at the 2019 Rose d'Or Awards.

== See also ==
- Chelmsford 123, an earlier British sitcom set in Britain during Roman times
- Kaamelott, a French series based on Arthurian legends
- Cavegirl, an earlier British children's programme of a similar concept set in the Stone Age
