= The Ballad of Wallis Island =

2025 British comedy film

- Promotional poster
- Directed by: James Griffiths
- Screenplay by: Tom Basden; Tim Key
- Based on: The One and Only Herb McGwyer Plays Wallis Island by: Tom Basden; Tim Key
- Produced by: Rupert Majendie
- Starring: Tom Basden; Tim Key; Carey Mulligan
- Cinematography: G. Magni Ágústsson
- Edited by: Quin Williams
- Music by: Adem Ilhan
- Production company: Baby Cow Films
- Distributed by: Focus Features (through Universal Pictures)
- Release dates: 25 January 2025 (Sundance); 30 May 2025 (United Kingdom)
- Running time: 100 minutes
- Country: United Kingdom
- Language: English
- Box office: $6.4 million

The Ballad of Wallis Island is a 2025 British comedy-drama film directed by James Griffiths, produced by Rupert Majendie, and written by Tim Key and Tom Basden. It is based on their 2007 short film The One and Only Herb McGwyer Plays Wallis Island. Basden and Carey Mulligan star as a folk duo who reunite to perform for a wealthy fan (Tim Key) on a remote British island.

The Ballad of Wallis Island premiered at the Sundance Film Festival on 25 January 2025, followed by a limited theatrical release by Focus Features in the United States on 28 March and in the United Kingdom on 30 May 2025.

== Plot ==
Musician Herb McGwyer, formerly half of folk duo McGwyer Mortimer, arrives on the remote Wallis Island off the coast of Wales, where eccentric widowed superfan Charles Heath has contracted him to play a show before a select, private audience. After winning the lottery, Charles travelled the world with his late wife Marie, who loved McGwyer Mortimer, spending all their money. They then won the lottery again and retired to the island, where Marie died five years prior to the events of the film.

Charles brings Herb to stay at his home, presenting his £500,000 fee as a suitcase of cash. Charles also gifts Herb with a few things he has expressed a fondness for in interviews, including Herb’s favorite apples. Having transitioned from folk music to commercial pop, Herb intends to use the money to finance the next album in his struggling solo career. He fends off Charles's questions about his professional and personal breakup with his former musical and romantic partner Nell Mortimer. Charles reveals the makeshift "stage", a pallet on the beach, and eventually admits that he will be the show's sole audience.

Herb is surprised by the arrival of Nell, whom he has not seen in years, and her American husband Michael, whom he meets for the first time. Charles is thrilled to have reunited McGwyer Mortimer, but tensions flare over dinner when Nell, who has retired from music and now sells homemade chutney at farmers' markets in Portland, Oregon, discovers that Charles is paying her £200,000 less than Herb for the gig. After a heated argument, Herb storms off to his room and attempts to leave the island in the morning, but stays only after Michael confides that he and Nell need the money.

Charles shows Herb and Nell his collection of McGwyer Mortimer memorabilia, including Herb's old guitar and what turns out to be a counterfeit lock of Nell's hair. After Michael leaves for a birdwatching tour on the far side of the island, Herb and Nell reconnect as they rehearse their old folk songs for a deeply moved Charles. Playing tennis with Herb, Charles notes that the only strong aspect of his game is his serve, since he always plays alone. Herb urges Charles to ask out Amanda, a single mother who runs the island's only shop, while Charles insists there is still chemistry between Herb and Nell.

Herb and Nell bring Charles to spend a joyful "Seamen's Day" on the beach, writing wishes on sky lanterns and releasing them at sunset. Later, Herb tells Nell that he is still in love with her, but she reveals she is pregnant and accuses him of fixating on their past. Leaving a real lock of her hair for an understanding Charles, who urges her to continue writing music, Nell departs.

Lashing out at Charles, Herb packs his things, including his old guitar, and storms off in the rain. With no boat available to ferry him off the island, he leaves his bags with Amanda, who has learned about his music from her teenage son, and returns to Charles's house. Michael arrives in the morning to collect Nell's money—after Charles lied to him that the gig took place early—and lectures Herb about his pursuit of Nell and the sorry state of his musical career.

When a despondent Herb wades out to retrieve one of the lanterns, Charles assumes he is trying to commit suicide and tries to save him, but Herb rescues Charles instead. Having arranged the show for the fifth anniversary of Marie's death, Charles accepts that forcing a McGwyer Mortimer reunion was a mistake and offers to pay Herb regardless. However, the message on the sky lantern reveals Charles' love for Marie, inspiring Herb to play the show and invite Amanda on Charles's behalf. Herb performs for them late into the night, dedicating a final song to Marie.

The next day, Herb thanks Charles as they part ways, hugging him goodbye. After returning home, Charles discovers that Herb left the money and his guitar, signed with his real name—"Your biggest fan, Chris Pinner". Amanda arrives, dressed for a game of tennis. Motoring away from the island on a boat, Chris opens the suitcase that the money was in to reveal it now only holds his favorite apples that Charles gifted him in the beginning. Chris smiles, tosses one in his hand, and takes a big bite. As the credits play, Chris, no longer using his stage name, records a new folk song, "The Ballad of Wallis Island".

== Cast ==
- Tim Key as Charles Heath, an eccentric widower who became a multimillionaire by winning the lottery twice. His wife, Marie, had died five years earlier.
- Tom Basden as Herb McGwyer/Chris Pinner. Once half of the McGwyer Mortimer folk music duo, he embarked on a solo career after breaking up with his former musical and romantic partner Nell. He now plays pop music, although his recent releases have been unsuccessful.
- Carey Mulligan as Nell Mortimer, the other half of the former McGwyer Mortimer duo and Herb's former romantic partner. She retired from music following their breakup and moved to Portland, Oregon, where she sells homemade chutney at farmers' markets.
- Akemnji Ndifornyen as Michael, Nell's American husband, who is an avid birdwatcher.
- Sian Clifford as Amanda, the island's only shopkeeper, who lives above her shop with her teenage son.

== Production ==
The project began as a short film Key and Basden made with James Griffiths, produced by Moxie Pictures. The One and Only Herb McGwyer Plays Wallis Island won best short film at the Edinburgh International Film Festival and was nominated for the 2008 BAFTA Award for Best Short Film. Many lines from the short appear verbatim in the film.

The feature film, initially entitled One For the Money, had Rupert Majendie as producer with Bankside Films representing sales. Focus Features subsequently acquired worldwide rights to the project, which was later retitled The Ballad of Wallis Island, with Universal Pictures handling the international release on its behalf.

Principal photography was scheduled for Wales in 2023, and was completed in 18 days. Filming locations included Pembrokeshire and Carmarthenshire.

Songs are by Tom Basden, performed by himself and Carey Mulligan.

== Release ==
The Ballad of Wallis Island premiered at the Sundance Film Festival on 25 January 2025, followed by a limited theatrical release in the United States on 28 March 2025. It had its UK premiere on 5 March 2025 at the Glasgow Film Festival as the annual ‘Surprise Film’. It was screened on 25 April 2025 as the opening film of the International Film Festival of St Andrews. The film was released in cinemas across the UK on 30 May 2025.

It was screened in the Icon section of the 2025 Stockholm International Film Festival on 8 November 2025.

== Reception ==
On the review aggregator website Rotten Tomatoes, 97% of 144 critics' reviews are positive, with an average rating of 8.0/10. The website's consensus reads: "The Ballad of Wallis Island hums along a sweet melody without lapsing into outright sentimentality, mining a great deal of warmth from its humble premise." Metacritic, which uses a weighted average, assigned the film a score of 78 out of 100, based on 34 critics, indicating "generally favorable" reviews.

Robert Daniels of RogerEbert.com gave the film three out of four stars and wrote, "The director James Griffith's The Ballad of Wallis Island is a sublime, adorable comedy whose roots can be traced to a short Griffith made eighteen years ago." Critic Bob Mondello reviewed the film favourably, writing for NPR that it is "at once an odd-couple bromance, a quite respectable musical outing, and a nostalgic look at the memories we all lock up in the harmonies in our heads – the ones we carry with us through life."

=== Accolades ===
Award	Date of ceremony	Category	Recipient(s)	Result	Ref.
Astra Midseason Movie Awards	3 July 2025	Best Screenplay	Tom Basden and Tim Key	Nominated	
Hollywood Music in Media Awards	19 November 2025	Original Score – Independent Film	Adem Ilhan	Nominated	
Hollywood Music in Media Awards	19 November 2025	Song – Onscreen Performance (Film)	Tom Basden and Carey Mulligan (for "Our Love")	Nominated	
Hollywood Music in Media Awards	19 November 2025	Music Supervision – Film	Gary Welch	Nominated	
Hollywood Music in Media Awards	19 November 2025	Music Themed Film, Biopic or Musical	The Ballad of Wallis Island	Nominated	
British Independent Film Awards	30 November 2025	Best British Independent Film	James Griffiths, Tom Basden, Tim Key and Rupert Majendie	Nominated	
British Independent Film Awards	30 November 2025	Best Joint Lead Performance	Tom Basden and Tim Key	Won	
British Independent Film Awards	30 November 2025	Best Screenplay	Tom Basden and Tim Key	Won	
British Independent Film Awards	30 November 2025	Best Debut Screenwriter	Tom Basden and Tim Key	Nominated	
British Independent Film Awards	30 November 2025	Best Original Music	Tom Basden and Adem Ilhan	Won	
British Academy Film Awards	22 February 2026	Best Actress in a Supporting Role	Carey Mulligan	Nominated	
British Academy Film Awards	22 February 2026	Best Adapted Screenplay	Tom Basden and Tim Key	Nominated	
British Academy Film Awards	22 February 2026	Outstanding British Film	James Griffiths, Rupert Majendie, Tom Basden, and Tim Key	Nominated	
