= We Need Answers =

Television series

- Created by: Mark Watson; Tim Key; Alex Horne
- Directed by: Steve Smith
- Presented by: Mark Watson; Tim Key; Alex Horne
- Country of origin: United Kingdom
- No. of series: 2
- No. of episodes: 16

Production
- Producer: Simon London
- Production location: Stephen Street Studios
- Editor: Graham Barker
- Running time: 30 minutes
- Production company: BBC

Original release
- Network: BBC Four
- Release: 12 February 2009 – 23 February 2010

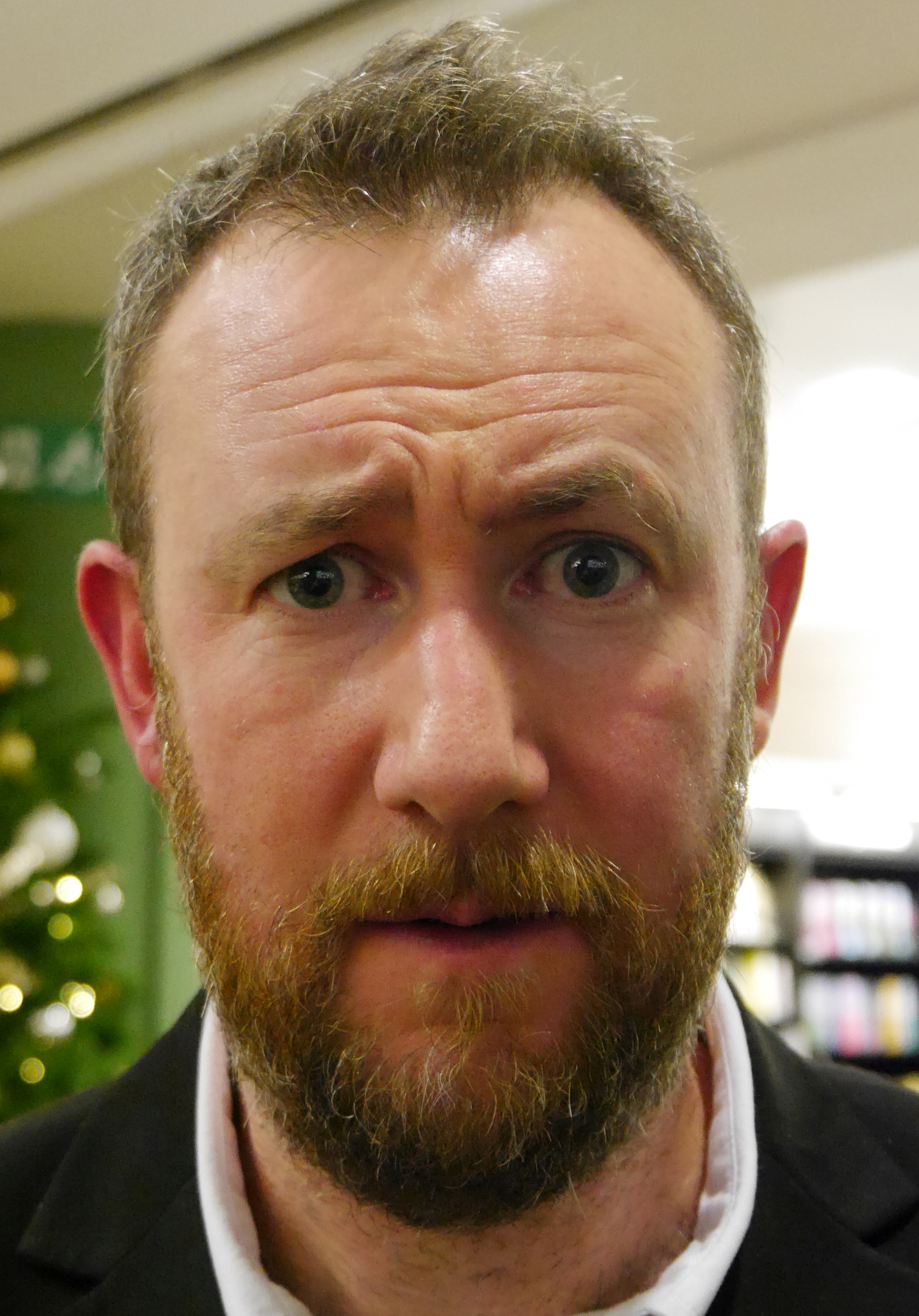
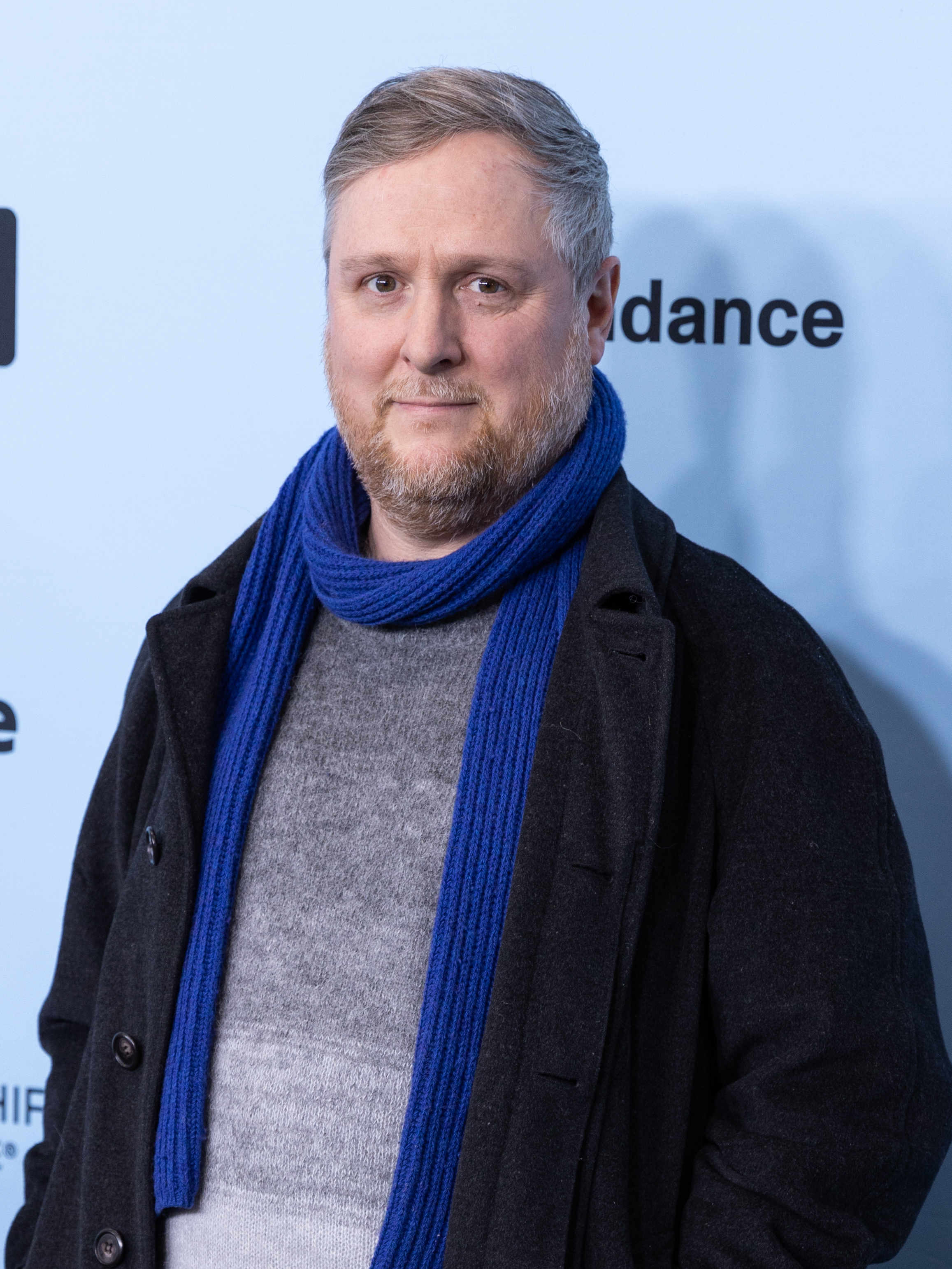
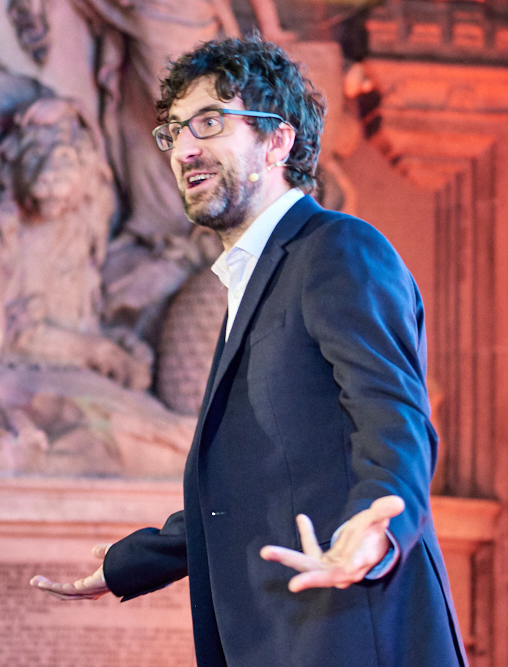
Alex Horne, Tim Key and Mark Watson are the presenters of We Need Answers, and the contestants in No More Women and No More Jockeys

We Need Answers is a British television panel game presented by comedians Mark Watson, Tim Key and Alex Horne. The show features a pair of celebrities answering questions which had previously been texted in by the public, or the audience by text message.

The show ran for two series between February 2009 and February 2010.

== Format ==
In We Need Answers, Watson acted as the main host, Key as the question master, and Horne as the studio expert, as well as the man responsible for the computer graphics and sound effects used in the show.

During the show, correct answers scored two points, wrong answers scored nothing, and one point was given to an answer which was "quite right", or partly correct. Recurring themes in the series included "Sad Questions", relating to morbid topics and accompanied by sad music.

The quiz was split into the following rounds:

- Burning Issues and Fiddly Questions: Key asked questions to each contestant in turn, some of which were based around a general theme covering the episode.
- You or Him/Her: The contestant could each answer a question about themselves, or try and score double points by answering questions about their opponent. In the first series this round always featured Horne explaining the doubling rule.
- The Physical Challenge: The contestants took part in a physical challenge based on a question texted to them.
- Quick fire Meltdown Round: A round of quick fire questions on buzzers, with all the questions scoring double points. It was a timed round with a time on the bottom of the TV screen depicting the faces of the contestants. The round ended when the face hit each other. At the end of this round, the contestant with the lowest score lost and left the studio wearing "The clogs of defeat". The winner received a certificate.
- Big Money/House Prize Showdown: The winner could choose to answer a special question for a small cash prize or, in the second series, an item from one of the hosts' houses.

== History ==
We Need Answers first saw the light as a late night comedy show at the Canal Cafe Theatre in London. After a year's development it was taken to the Edinburgh Fringe for two years running, sponsored by 63336. The contestants in Edinburgh were exclusively standup comedians, who were at the festival with their own shows.

In its inaugural year at the Fringe in 2007, the competition featured the likes of Daniel Kitson, Simon Amstell, Henning Wehn, Brendon Burns & Lucy Porter taking part in the quiz, which took the format of a traditional sporting tournament over the month; heats leading to quarter and semi finals. The grand final was between Josie Long and Paul Sinha, with Sinha proving to be the ultimate winner.

Its second year, 2008, saw a final between Josie Long and Kristen Schaal: Long emerged victorious.

In late 2008 the BBC produced a pilot at Ginglik comedy club, London, before launching the first series on BBC Four in early 2009.

== Transmissions ==
Series	Episodes	Originally released	
Series	Episodes	First released	Last released
1	3	12 February 2009	26 February 2009
2	13	1 December 2009	23 February 2010

== Episodes ==
=== Series 1 (2009) ===
No. overall	No. in series	Theme	Contestants	Original release date
1	1	Reading	Germaine Greer and Michael Rosen	12 February 2009
2	2	Motoring	Julia Bradbury and Robert Llewellyn	19 February 2009
3	3	Wine	Jilly Goolden and Jay Rayner	26 February 2009

=== Series 2 (2009–10) ===
No. overall	No. in series	Theme	Contestants	Original release date
4	1	Women (and Steven Gerrard)	Jenni Murray and Martin Offiah	1 December 2009
5	2	Love (and sleeping around)	Vanessa Feltz and Simon Bird	8 December 2009
6	3	Poetry, God, Politics and Geography	Miranda Hart and Ian McMillan	15 December 2009
7	4	Christmas	Kirsten O'Brien and Neil Innes	22 December 2009
8	5	Language	Tracy-Ann Oberman and Jake Arnott	29 December 2009
9	6	The Sun and Vegetables	Sophie Grigson and Kelvin MacKenzie	5 January 2010
10	7	Celebrities	Camilla Dallerup and Terry Christian	12 January 2010
11	8	Medicine	Sue Perkins and Phil Hammond	19 January 2010
12	9	Youth and Kings and Queens	Jennie Bond and Rick Edwards	26 January 2010
13	10	Media and Eating	Esther Rantzen and John Inverdale	2 February 2010
14	11	Nature [feat. Giraffes]	Aggie MacKenzie and Peter Tatchell	9 February 2010
15	12	Music and Fauna and Smut	Rowan Pelling and DJ Nihal	16 February 2010
16	13	Exploring Ireland	Sharon Horgan and Benedict Allen	23 February 2010

== No More Women / No More Jockeys ==
No More Women is an oral game invented in 2002 by the comedians Mark Watson and Tim Key. During the writing of a show, Key challenged Watson to name as many famous people as he could. After listing many football and cricket players, Watson commented "OK, no more footballers", and this was developed into a game which the two of them played with Alex Horne for years.

The rules of the game are that each player in turn declares the name of a famous person and a category into which that person falls, to which no subsequent answer may belong (e.g., "Marie Curie - no more women"). If a player names a person who belongs to a category and is challenged about it, or is unable to think of a person, they are eliminated from the game. A player may insist their opponent "name another", to prevent the creation of categories which exclude only a single person. The game can also be played with a chess clock.

A web-exclusive show No More Women was broadcast on the BBC Comedy website in 2009 as a spin-off from We Need Answers. Watson, Key and Horne have sometimes played the game live on stage, for instance at London's Canal Cafe Theatre one Sunday afternoon in 2006. The game was also played on the Radio 4 show It's Your Round in March 2011, when Key was one of the panellists and his competitors were Bridget Christie, Micky Flanagan and Nick Hancock.

The game was relaunched in June 2020 as No More Jockeys with its own channel on YouTube and codified rules. A series of games were played as a weekly three-way contest between Horne, Key, and Watson, across a video link, during the COVID-19 pandemic. The games continued over the year, and Esquire magazine called the series a "lockdown phenomenon". The Daily Telegraph praised the "perfect comic chemistry" of the trio, and described No More Jockeys as a parlour game "for the ages". Digital Spy noted the game "in many ways [...] has the thrill of sport" with the comments section for each game "full of mock-serious punditry analysing the players' form". A live, ticketed edition of the game was broadcast for the Leicester Comedy Festival in February 2021, and became the fastest selling show in the festival's history. In March 2021, the Chortle Awards gave "Legends of Lockdown" prizes to Horne, Key and Watson, partly for No More Jockeys as well as their own individual works.
