= Anna Crilly =

English actress and comedian

- Born: Anna Crilly; 28 November 1975 (age 50); Tonbridge, Kent, England
- Education: Kent College, Pembury; Middlesex University
- Occupations: Actress; writer; comedian
- Years active: 1996–present
- Spouse: William Andrews
- Relatives: Robert Crilly (brother)

Anna Crilly is an English actress and comedian.

== Education ==
Crilly was educated at Kent College, Pembury, and attended Middlesex University, where she studied performing arts.

== Career ==
She was a finalist in the So You Think You're Funny? competition at the Gilded Balloon in 2003 and performed two shows at the Edinburgh Festival Fringe in the following year. In 2004, she was placed at the Funny Women Awards. From 2006 to 2011 she played the role of Magda, an Eastern European housekeeper, in the BBC sitcom Lead Balloon. Her deadpan performance has been described as "scene-stealing". In 2013 she and regular comedy partner Katy Wix began starring in their own sketch show, Anna and Katy, on Channel 4, having originated the show as a Comedy Lab episode the previous year.

She stars in the BBC children's comedy series Sorry, I've Got No Head, alongside William Andrews, James Bachman, Marcus Brigstocke, Mel Giedroyc, Marek Larwood and Nick Mohammed. In December 2008 Crilly was nominated for a British Comedy Award as Best Female Newcomer for her portrayal of Magda in Lead Balloon, but lost out to Katy Brand. In 2007 she appeared in episode 78, "Susan of Troy", of My Family as an assistant on The Weakest Link. She also appeared as "woman" in Ricky Gervais' comedy Extras as an extra herself (series 2, episode 5). She has also starred in Pixelface, a comedy for children, as a waitress zombie slayer called Claire Parker.

In 2011, she appeared in an episode of the sitcom Not Going Out, playing the role of a drug misuse counsellor. The same year she had a guest role on the radio series Cabin Pressure as Linda Fairburn.

Crilly plays the lead role as Coma Girl in Channel 4's Comedy Showcase, again alongside Katy Wix. She and Wix also appeared together in the Harvey's Furniture Store sponsorship bumpers for Coronation Street until the sponsorship deal ended in 2012.

She plays Mel Gatwick in Tom Basden's sitcom Party for BBC Radio 4.

In 2012 she appeared as "Nurse" in a sketch called "The Private Detectives" in the TV programme "The One Jasper Carrott" with Jasper Carrott and Robert Powell.

On 22 June 2012, she played Gertrude Wermers in the third episode of BBC series Dead Boss.

In 2016, she appeared in an episode of BBC Three's comedy series Witless.

In 2017, she appeared in Death in Paradise episode "Man Overboard" (season 6 episode 5) as Lucy Chapman.

Crilly portrayed Detective Sergeant Natalie Golding in the 2023 BBC One drama The Sixth Commandment, which portrayed the crimes of Ben Field.

In October 2023 Crilly appeared in Ghosts (2019 British TV series) as an insurance investigator.

== Filmography ==
=== TV ===
Year	Title	Character	Production	Notes
2006-2011	Lead Balloon	Magda	BBC Two	TV series
2008-2011	Sorry, I've Got No Head	Various	CBBC	TV series
2011-2012	Pixelface	Claireparker	CBBC	TV series
2013	Anna & Katy	Herself	Channel 4	TV series
2023	Ghosts	Joy Kielty	BBC One	TV series (season 5 episode 1)
2025	Amandaland	Cherry	BBC One	TV series (series 1 episode 2)
2025	How Are You? It's Alan (Partridge)	Dr Marion Boyle	BBC One	TV series (series 1 episode 2)
2025	Sister Boniface Mysteries	Sandra Hubbard	U&Drama	TV series ("A Murder of Crows" season 4 episode 2)

== Personal life ==
Crilly is married to British comedian William Andrews. Crilly's brother is journalist and author Robert Crilly.
