= Party (radio series) =

British radio sitcom

- Genre: Political comedy
- Running time: 30 minutes
- Country of origin: United Kingdom
- Language: English
- Home station: BBC Radio 4
- Starring: Tom Basden; Tim Key; Jonny Sweet; Anna Crilly; Katy Wix
- Directed by: Tom Basden
- Executive producer: Julia McKenzie
- Original release: 10 March 2010 – 26 December 2018
- No. of series: 3
- No. of episodes: 13
- Audio format: Stereophonic sound

Party is a BBC Radio 4 sitcom. Based on his 2009 Edinburgh fringe play, the show was written by Tom Basden and produced by Julia McKenzie. The show also starred Tom Basden alongside Tim Key, Jonny Sweet, Anna Crilly and Katy Wix. The series surrounds young idealists who want to get into British politics but are naïve and have no idea how to.

Repeats of the series have also been broadcast on BBC Radio 4 Extra.

== Cast ==
- Tom Basden as Simon
- Jonny Sweet as Jared
- Anna Crilly as Mel
- Katy Wix as Phoebe
- Tim Key as Duncan

== Plot ==
The five characters are in their early twenties, fresh from leaving university and wanting to get into politics by forming a new political party. The party was unnamed throughout much of the series as the group cannot decide on one, adopting the placeholder name of 'Team Jared' when contesting a by-election. In attempting to define their position on the political spectrum, they described themselves as "left-centre-right-wing". Simon is direct and finds himself arguing with Mel on many key points, though he also has a quick wit. Jared sees himself as the leader of the group, while also providing the meeting venue of his parents' garden shed (or 'summer house' as he always insists on calling it); however, following his parents' divorce, Jared loses access to the shed, forcing the party to conduct its meetings in a series of improvised locations. Mel also considers herself to be a leader figure and argues with Jared about the direction they should go, with her having a strong will. Phoebe is the optimist of the group, though is often somewhat naïve. Duncan is the new arrival to the group and was initially only invited and appointed 'Communications Tsar' because his stepfather owned a printing shop. He initially believed that his first meeting with the group was a birthday party, and is seen as dim-witted by the others. On occasion, he has taken on serious roles within the party by accident, briefly serving as leader after an impromptu leadership election resulted in everyone else being eliminated through disapproval voting (using his brief tenure in the role to be served cake), and being interviewed on local radio when the party contested a by-election in Corby albeit after being mistaken for Jared, the actual candidate.

Meetings are held to discuss policy, though the group spends much of the time in conflict and getting little done, with any policies that are suggested or adopted being outlandish, based on anecdotes or misconceptions, offensive, or otherwise terrible. These include:

- An actual ban on blankets (cf. blanket ban) to deter rough sleeping and drug use by the homeless.
- A requirement that spare bedrooms be used to accommodate the homeless (objected to by Jared for being a 'tax on people with nice houses').
- Forcing armed forces to fight either in plain clothes or the nude to curtail war.
- Forcing Mark Zuckerberg to publicly take a bath to prove whether or not he is a robot.
- Banning the drug and the word "meow meow", as well as all other recreational drugs (albeit in a rush to settle social policy).
- A 'Four Rs' education policy focusing on 'reading, writing, arithmetic and spelling' (albeit in a "back to basics" approach).
- Using buses as retirement homes to take advantage of free travel for the elderly (nicked "The Grundy Bus" after Mel's pet name for her grandfather).
- Establishing a dwarf-only country in Wales.
- A "Don't You-rope Us In" policy against further European integration and bail-outs (adopted to appeal to older Corby voters and because of minor irritations with European culture and a foreign passenger on the train that the group was on when discussing European policy).
- Being 'for' China (agreed upon only because of confusion during voting on policy motions and time constraints, despite objections to China's human rights record).
- Revitalising the Corby trouser press industry to reduce youth unemployment (adopted primarily to appeal to Corby voters).
- Banning people from calling their children 'junior' (owing to confusion ahead of a protest against Donald Trump).
- Using Premier Inns as cost-effective alternatives to prisons while transferring the then-vacant prisons to the Premier Inn franchise.
- A statement that technology was making people stupid (adopted whilst being distracted by computers and smart phones).
- Celebrating ability diversity by giving all disabled people gold medals (inspired by the 2012 Paralympics).
- A contrarian LGBTQ+ policy of "getting them out of the graveyard and into the church", supporting marriage equality whilst barring gay people from cemeteries to prevent cottaging.
- Reviving Top of the Pops.
- Renaming rapeseed to something less offensive.

== Broadcast history ==
The first series was aired in March 2010, with four episodes being broadcast. A second four-episode series followed in June 2011. The third and final series was broadcast in September 2012. All episodes have a runtime of thirty minutes.

After a six-year break, a thirty-minute Christmas Special was broadcast on 26 December 2018. A repeat also aired as part of the BBC Radio 4 Comedy of the Week on the 31 December 2018.

== Episodes ==
The first series did not make use of episode titles.

=== Series 1 (2010) ===
No. overall	No. in series	Title	Original release date
1	1	"Episode One"	10 March 2010
The gang meet at Jared's parents' shed and try to discuss policy, before arguing about who will be the leader and the party name. New member Duncan has joined the team after attending on the promise of cake at the meeting, however he is initially invited as his stepfather owns a printing shop.
2	2	"Episode Two"	17 March 2010
Discussing their policy on China, the group is being held up by Phoebe talking to her new boyfriend, Eamon, who is older than her and the rest of the members. When he offers to help them with the party, having studied politics himself, they reject the help which causes a strain on Phoebe's relationship with him.
3	3	"Episode Three"	24 March 2010
Jared organises a meeting while his parents are away. An incident involving a bird flying into a window results in Jared having to undertake a humane killing; however his parents' Polish gardener sees the incident and resorts to blackmailing the group out of emergency money Jared's parents had left him.
4	4	"Episode Four"	31 March 2010
Outside the council offices, the five launch a protest to stop the war in Afghanistan as well as to raise the party profile. However, rain confines the protest to Mel's car. Events turn for the worse when Jared knocks a cyclist off his bike with a trombone, and Mel crashes the car resulting in the five being arrested.

=== Series 2 (2011) ===
No. overall	No. in series	Title	Original release date
5	1	"All Publicity Is Good Publicity"	1 June 2011
A journalist is due to arrive to interview the party, however Simon suggests the lack of diversity may result in uncomfortable questions. Mel tasks them with coming up on a policy for diversity, before talking Duncan into pretending to be disabled and sitting him in a wheelchair.
6	2	"It's Technology, Stupid"	8 June 2011
Setting up a policy on technology, with the group arguing about whether technology makes people stupid. Jared reveals he gained a U in GCSE Maths, and also offers a badly edited party video he has made on his laptop. When his mum walks in having lost her voice, Duncan accidentally opens some porn.
7	3	"Prison Ain't All That Bad"	15 June 2011
Simon discusses his father spending time in prison as the group discuss prison policy. His bicycle is subsequently believed to be stolen by a mystery friend of Phoebe's known as Deep Voice. When Simon's father turns up at the meeting having discovered the stolen bike, he gets into an altercation with Deep Voice.
8	4	"Is The Party Over?"	22 June 2011
Jared's parents have their house up for sale, and a homeless man is hanging around nearby. As the group tries to come up with social policies, Simon suggests that the meeting is pointless as Jared will be moving to the Isle of Wight, and Mel becomes upset at the homeless man being ignored. However, attempting to reach out she ends up getting chased around the garden.

=== Series 3 (2012) ===
No. overall	No. in series	Title	Original release date
9	1	"The Curry"	19 September 2012
The five members head to a curry house for a party meeting, before ending up arguing over the order. Mel has to avoid coconut due to an allergy, while everyone comments on Duncan having got fit over the summer. Jared also announces that he is to run as a Member of Parliament for Corby.
10	2	"The Grundy"	26 September 2012
Phoebe is in hospital after having a surgical procedure on her appendix, so the other four take to visiting her at her bedside. Moving on to discussing policies surrounding the elderly, a nurse believes Jared to be taking drugs and then stealing from another patient. They also find Phoebe's procedure was something different.
11	3	"The Splits"	3 October 2012
Whilst on a train to Corby ahead of the by-election, the group ends up taking a stance against Europe due to a man sat in one of the reserved seats and a belief that it would appeal to Corby's older electorate. The guard gets involved in an altercation between them and the man, where they find the tickets they have booked are not valid.
12	4	"Radio"	10 October 2012
Arriving at a radio station for a scheduled interview in Corby that Jared is giving, Duncan has also brought along his baby nephew. However, when the baby is sick all over Jared, Duncan ends up being interviewed on the radio by mistake and announces a range of terrible policies.

=== Special (2018) ===
No. overall	Title	Original release date
13	"Christmas Special"	26 December 2018
The group reunite after six years to head up to Scotland to protest Donald Trump's rumoured arrival to his golf course. Mel is eight months pregnant with Jared's baby, and Simon's car in which they are travelling is particularly cramped.
