= Mark Watson Makes the World Substantially Better =

- Country of origin: United Kingdom
- Language(s): English
- Home station: BBC Radio 4
- Hosted by: Mark Watson
- Starring: Mark Watson, Tim Key, Tom Basden, Tim Minchin
- No. of series: 2
- No. of episodes: 12

Mark Watson Makes the World Substantially Better is a radio comedy programme starring Mark Watson. It started on BBC Radio 4 on 13 February 2007. The show is recorded in front of a live audience and has the format of stand-up comedy from Watson interspersed with songs and poetry.

== Series 1 ==
Each episode of the first series dealt with the problems of the world, characterised by the seven deadly sins. Tim Minchin provided music, and Tim Key provided poetry.

- Episode 1 - Greed and Gluttony (the "similar sins")
- Episode 2 - Lust
- Episode 3 - Pride
- Episode 4 - Envy
- Episode 5 - Sloth
- Episode 6 - Wrath

== Series 2 ==
The second series began on 13 August 2008, this time looking at the world's virtues. Tim Key again provided poems, but Tom Basden replaced Minchin as the musician.

- Episode 1 - Courage
- Episode 2 - Patience
- Episode 3 - Generosity
- Episode 4 - Honesty
- Episode 5 - Diligence
- Episode 6 - Humility
