= Mark Watson =

British comedian and writer (born 1980)

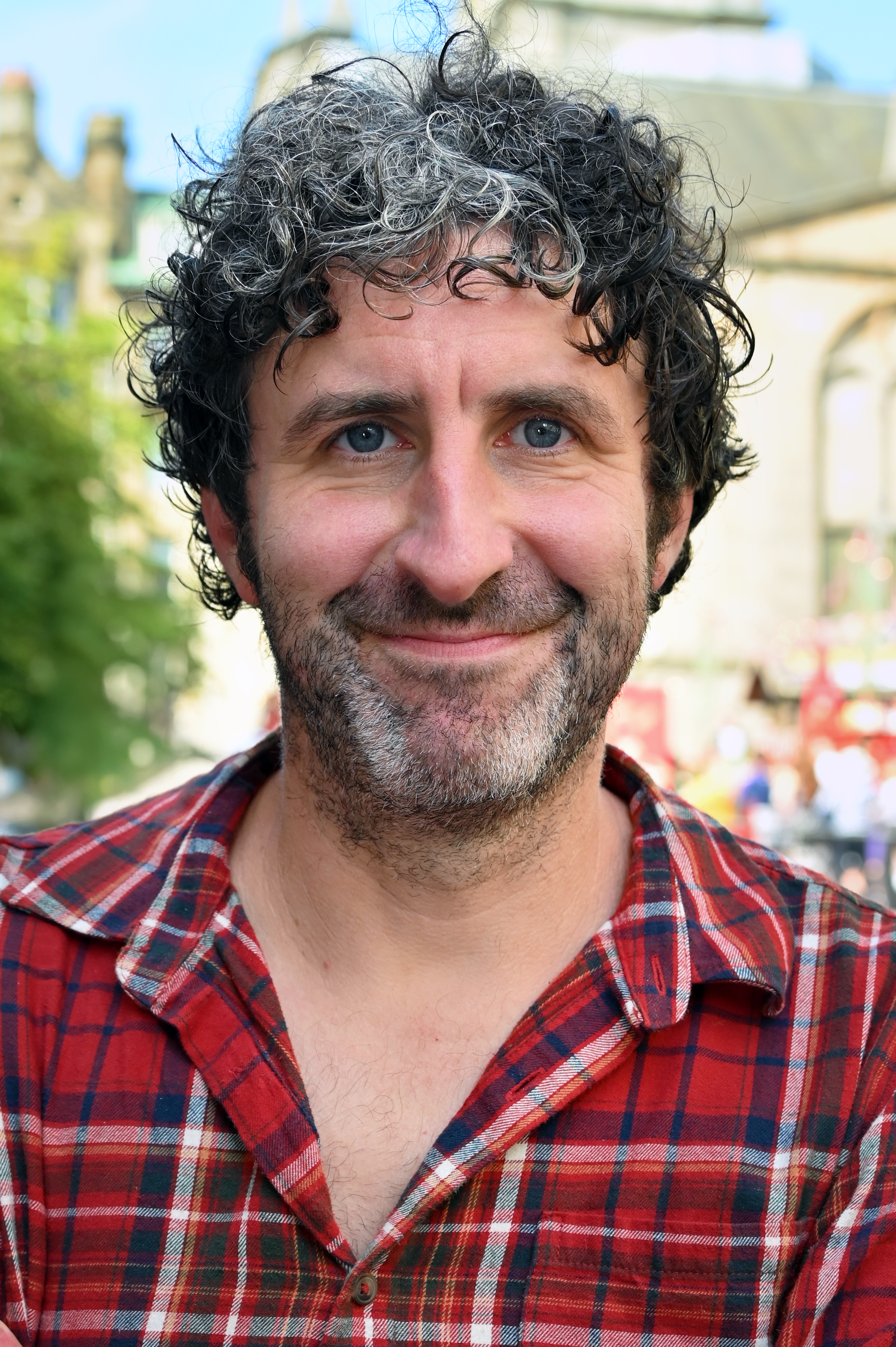
- Watson in 2025
- Born: Mark Andrew Watson; 13 February 1980 (age 46); Bristol, England
- Education: University of Cambridge (BA)
- Notable work: Mark Watson Makes the World Substantially Better; Taskmaster
- Spouse: Emily Howes (m. 2004; div. 2019)
- Children: 2

Comedy career
- Years active: 1999–present
- Medium: Stand-up, television, radio, author
- Genres: Satire, observational comedy
- Subjects: Everyday life, family, politics, stereotypes, current events
- Website: www.markwatsonthecomedian.com

Mark Andrew Watson (born 13 February 1980) is an English comedian, novelist and producer.

== Early life ==
Watson was born in Bristol to a Welsh mother and English father. He has younger twin sisters and a brother, Paul. He attended Bristol Grammar School, where he won a "Gabbler of the Year" award. He went on to study English at Queens' College, Cambridge, graduating with first class honours. At university he was a member of the Footlights and contemporary of Stefan Golaszewski, Tim Key and Dan Stevens. He was part of the revue which was nominated for the Best Newcomer category in the Perrier Comedy Awards at the 2001 Edinburgh Festival Fringe and also co-directed a revue with Key.

== Career ==
=== Comedy ===
Although not brought up in Wales, Watson used to deliver his act with a common Welsh accent which is not quite his own. He adopted it when he started stand-up comedy, saying that it made him "more comfortable to be talking in a voice that I didn't quite recognise as my own". He has since reverted to his own accent.

Watson has appeared regularly at the Edinburgh Festival Fringe, winning the first ever Panel Prize at the if.comeddies in 2006 and being nominated for Best Newcomer at the 2005 Perrier Comedy Awards. His other awards include the Time Out Critics' Choice Award 2006 and a Barry Award nomination for best show at the Melbourne Comedy Festival 2006.

Watson has performed several unusual shows at the Edinburgh Fringe and Melbourne Festivals, including marathon shows lasting 24 hours or more. The first of these was performed at the 2004 Edinburgh Festival Fringe, which lasted 24 hours. At the end of the show he proposed to his girlfriend Emily Howes, who accepted. These shows have featured guest appearances from other performers such as Tim Minchin, Adam Hills, Daniel Kitson, David O'Doherty, Sarah Millican, Gillian Anderson, and John Dorney as the balladeer.

At the 2006 Edinburgh Festival Fringe Watson hosted a literary workshop-cum-interactive comedy show entitled Mark Watson, And His Audience, Write A Novel. The aim was to write, by the end of August, a novel begun from scratch and woven entirely from audience suggestions, with another 2,000 words or so added each day. The novel was not finished within the month.

At the 2007 Fringe, Watson hosted a panel show We Need Answers with Alex Horne and Tim Key. This saw 16 comedians take part in a knock out quiz where all the questions and answers came from text service Any Question Answered. Paul Sinha won the competition, beating Josie Long in the final. We Need Answers returned in 2008 with fewer rounds; Josie Long emerged as winner, beating Sinha in the semi-final and Kristen Schaal in the final.

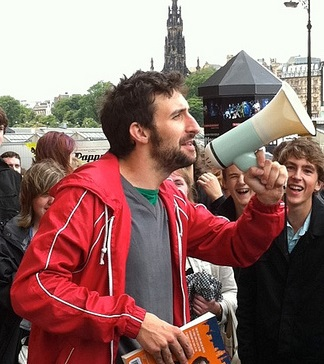
Watson at the Edinburgh book launch for Eleven in 2012

Watson performed his final 24-hour Fringe show at the 2009 festival along with his "Earth Summit" and his "Edit". The Earth Summit was Watson's version of the Al Gore talk about world pollution and global warming and the Edit was a compilation of Watson's fringe shows to date, made particularly for those who had not seen him perform there. Watson's debut DVD, The Mark Watson Edit, was initially due for release on 15 November 2010. However, Watson was forced to shelve the project and a new DVD recording was released on 28 November 2011, entitled Mark Watson Live.

In 2019, Watson staged a 26.2-hour live show to coincide with the London Marathon, and during the COVID-19 pandemic in 2020 he hosted two 24-hour "Watsonathon" events on the Twitch streaming platform.

Watson often performs gigs in unusual locations, including: on a ferry, from a stream, on a train, on the steps outside a theatre, in a vaccination queue, and in drive-in shows during the Covid pandemic.

==== Live shows ====
Year	Show name	Venue	Notes
2001	Far Too Happy	2001 Edinburgh Festival Fringe	Cambridge Footlights revue with Edward Jaspers, Tim Key, Day Macaskill, James Morris and Sophie Winkleman. Perrier Comedy Award nomination.
2004	Stereocomics	2004 Edinburgh Festival Fringe	With Rhod Gilbert
2004	Mark Watson's Overambitious 24-Hour Show	2004 Edinburgh Festival Fringe	
2005	50 Years Before Death and the Awful Prospect of Eternity	2005 Edinburgh Festival Fringe	Perrier Best Newcomer Award nomination
2005	2005 Years in 2005 Minutes	2005 Edinburgh Festival Fringe	
2006	I'm Worried That I'm Starting To Hate Almost Everyone in the World	2006 Edinburgh Festival Fringe	Won if.comeddie award Panel Prize
2006	Mark Watson's Seemingly Impossible 36-Hour Circuit of the World	2006 Edinburgh Festival Fringe	Won if.comeddie award Panel Prize
2006	Mark Watson, And His Audience, Write A Novel	2006 Edinburgh Festival Fringe	Won if.comeddie award Panel Prize
2007	Can I Briefly Talk To You About The Point of Life?	2007 Edinburgh Festival Fringe	Followed by UK tour
2007	Mark Watson's 24 Hour Jamboree To Save The Planet	2007 Edinburgh Festival Fringe	
2007	We Need Answers: The Inaugural Festival Challenge Cup	2007 Edinburgh Festival Fringe	Gameshow. With Tim Key and Alex Horne. Later transferred to BBC Four
2008	Mark Watson (And Friends) Take Control of the World in 24 Hours	Melbourne International Comedy Festival 2008	
2008	All The Thoughts I've Had Since I Was Born	2008 Edinburgh Festival Fringe	Followed by UK tour
2008	We Need Answers	2008 Edinburgh Festival Fringe	With Tim Key and Alex Horne
2009	Mark Watson's Earth Summit	2009 Edinburgh Festival Fringe	
2009	Mark Watson's Last Ever 24-Hour Show	2009 Edinburgh Festival Fringe	
2010	Do I Know You?	2010 Edinburgh Festival Fringe	Followed by UK tour
2010	Mark Watson's Unusually Enjoyable Book Launch	2010 Edinburgh Festival Fringe	Marking the launch of his novel Eleven
2011	The Mark Watson Edit		Released as a DVD
2012	Mark Watson: The Information	2012 Edinburgh Festival Fringe	
2012	Mark Watson's Edinborolympics	2012 Edinburgh Festival Fringe	
2012	The Hotel	2012 Edinburgh Festival Fringe	Comedic theatre show written and directed by Mark Watson.
2014	Flaws	2014 Edinburgh Festival Fringe	Followed by UK/Australia tour
2014	Mark Watson's Comedywealth Games	2014 Edinburgh Festival Fringe	
2016	Mark Watson's Edinborolympics	2016 Edinburgh Festival Fringe	
2016	I'm Not Here	2016 Edinburgh Festival Fringe	Work in progress, followed by tour before returning for 2017 Fringe
2017	Mark Watson's Festival of Bad Ideas	2017 Edinburgh Festival Fringe	
2018	The Infinite Show	2018 Edinburgh Festival Fringe	Followed by UK tour before returning for 2018 Fringe
2019	Mark Watson's Comedy Marathon	The Pleasance	26.2 hour charity show supporting Dementia Revolution
2019	How You Can Almost Win	2019 Edinburgh Festival Fringe	Work in progress show at 2018 Fringe. Based on his experiences on Celebrity Island with Bear Grylls. Followed by UK tour.
2020	Mark Watson's Watsonathon!	Livestreamed via Twitch	Charity livestream during the COVID-19 pandemic with funds going towards FareShare, The Hospice Income Generator Network, and NextUp Comedy
2020	Mark Watson's Watsonathon 2!	Livestreamed via Twitch	
2021	This Can't Be It	2021 Edinburgh Festival Fringe	Followed by UK tour
2023	Search	2023 Edinburgh Festival Fringe	Followed by UK tour
2025	Before It Overtakes Us	2025 Edinburgh Festival Fringe	Followed by UK tour

=== Television ===
A three-episode run of We Need Answers began on BBC Four on 12 February 2009, based on the Edinburgh Fringe show of the same name. As with the live show, Watson co-hosted with Tim Key and Alex Horne. A further 13 episodes were broadcast later in 2009. Guests for the series included Germaine Greer, Michael Rosen and Jilly Goolden.

In 2010 ITV4 commissioned Mark Watson Kicks Off, a sports panel show hosted by Watson, with three celebrities taking part each week in numerous rounds including "Beat the Best" (in which Watson takes on a sporting champion, but with a twist) and "I'm not a successful sports star but I'm related to someone who is" (in which the three celebrities ask questions to a guest who is related to a sports star).

In 2011, Watson hosted a pilot for an improvisational comedy show called Improvisation My Dear Mark Watson. The one-off episode was commissioned and broadcast by Dave, who chose not to create a full series. The pilot aired on 9 July.

In 2012, Watson starred with Micky Flanagan and host Mark Dolan as a captain in the Channel 4 panel programme The Mad Bad Ad Show.

==== Guest appearances ====
Watson has appeared as a panellist on shows including Never Mind the Buzzcocks, QI, Who Said That?, Guessable, 8 Out of 10 Cats, Argumental, Have I Got News For You, Mock The Week, Would I Lie to You?; and in Dictionary Corner on Countdown (2023).

He has been a contestant on Pointless Celebrities, Richard Osman's House of Games, Taskmaster, and Celebrity Mastermind.

He has performed stand-up on shows including Michael McIntyre's Comedy Roadshow (2009), Channel 4's Comedy Gala (2010), Live at the Apollo (2011), and Tonight at the London Palladium (2017).

In Australia, Watson has been seen on Rove, Good News Week, Spicks and Specks and the Melbourne International Comedy Festival, all aired in April 2007.

In 2011, he appeared on New Zealand comedy panel show 7 Days.

Watson has appeared on a number of sports programs, including The Premier League Show (2017–18), BBC Green Sport Awards (2022) and Sport Relief (2020).

Watson appeared as a talking head in Armando Iannucci's spoof documentary series Time Trumpet.

In 2017, he competed in series 5 of Taskmaster against Bob Mortimer, Sally Phillips, Nish Kumar and Aisling Bea, finishing joint second.

Also in 2017, Watson appeared on Celebrity Island with Bear Grylls alongside Iwan Thomas, Jordan Stephens, Lucy Mecklenburgh, Melody Thornton, RJ Mitte, Ryan Thomas, Sharron Davies and Shazia Mirza. Watson left on doctors' orders after suffering from severe chest pains and insomnia in the final episode.

In 2021, he appeared on Richard Osman's House of Games alongside Josie Lawrence, Raj Bisram and Laura Whitmore.

=== Radio ===
Year	Title	Co-hosts
2007-08	Mark Watson Makes the World Substantially Better	(Series 1) Tim Key, Tim Minchin (Series 2) Tom Basden, Tim Key
2011	Mark Watson's Live Address to the Nation	Tom Basden, Tim Key
2014-2023	Mark Watson Talks A Bit About Life	(Series 1) Tom Basden, Tim Key (Series 2) Will Adamsdale, Sam Simmons (Series 3-) Flo & Joan

In August 2009, Watson hosted a three-episode series on BBC Radio 5 Live called 100 Million or Bust, where a panel of guests attempted to spend £100 million on transfers as managers of an English Premier League team.

Watson has made regular appearances on the BBC Radio 5 Live show Fighting Talk.

=== Books ===
Year	Title	Notes
2004	Bullet Points	
2007	A Light-Hearted Look at Murder	
2008	Crap at the Environment	A non-fiction book which followed his efforts to halve his carbon footprint over the course of one year.
2011	Eleven	
2012	The Knot	
2015	Dan and Sam	A graphic novel with illustrations by Oliver Harud
2015	Hotel Alpha	
2016	The Place That Didn't Exist	
2020	Contacts	
2023	Mortification	First released as the audiobook 8 Deaths and Life After Them (2021)
2025	One Minute Away	

=== Other work ===
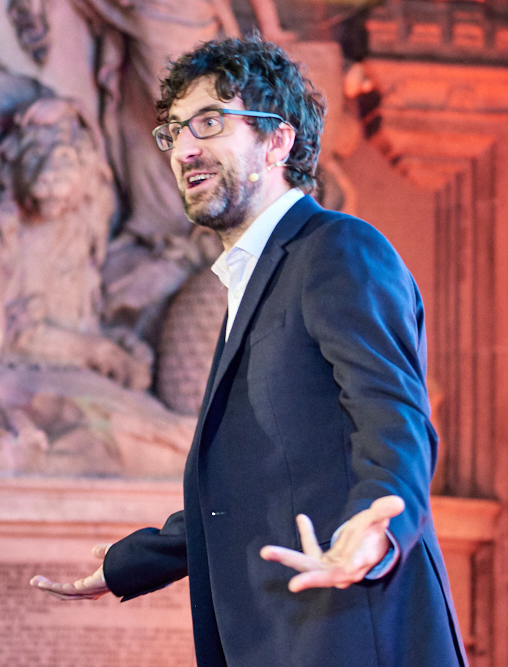
Watson in 2018

Watson co-runs a production company, Impatient Productions, which produces his own radio shows as well as for others such as Angela Barnes, Britain's Got Talent winner Viggo Venn, and Reverend Richard Coles.

Since 2025, Watson has written and starred in fictional podcast series Murder of a Famous Bastard, an interactive series where listeners can influence events through a Discord server.

Since September 2023, Watson and seven-time World Snooker Champion Stephen Hendry co-host the official podcast of the World Snooker Tour, Snooker Club. Each episode features special guests of sports, entertainment, and music personalities.

In December 2021, Watson launched a podcast through his production company with co-host Michael Chakraverty called menkind, discussing masculinity with a weekly guest. There have been 60 episodes to date, and guests have included Tom Daley, Nikesh Shukla, and Jordan Gray.

In 2020 during the COVID-19 pandemic, Watson, Tim Key and Alex Horne started a YouTube channel playing a game known as No More Jockeys. The three were given Chortle Legends of Lockdown awards for No More Jockeys as well as their individual work.

In 2009, Watson appeared in adverts for Magners Pear Cider, which became the subject of an extended routine by fellow comic Stewart Lee as part of his 2009 "If You Prefer A Milder Comedian, Please Ask For One" live show. In 2010 Watson provided the voiceover for a rabbit in an Innocent Smoothies advert. From 2018, Watson appeared in TUI commercials alongside fellow comedian Zoe Lyons on Sky One.

On 25 February, Watson presented the 2009 NME Awards at Brixton Academy.

At the start of the 2009/2010 season, Watson wrote a regular article in the Bristol City official matchday programme Well Red.

In December 2009, Watson's television drama A Child's Christmases in Wales starring Ruth Jones was broadcast as part of the Christmas 2009 season on BBC Four; it was described as peeping into the Christmases of a South Wales family during the 1980s.

== Personal life ==
Watson proposed to Emily Howes, a fellow novelist, writer-performer and theatre director, during a live marathon comedy routine at the Fringe, in front of an audience of 200. They married in 2004, with Tim Key acting as Watson's best man. Watson and Howes have two children. They divorced in 2019.

Watson is a lifelong supporter of Bristol City Football Club. He lives in East London.

== Stand-up specials ==
- Mark Watson Live (28 November 2011, DVD)
- Flaws (2014, DVD)
- The Infinite Show (2020, Vimeo) / (2024, YouTube)
- This Can't Be It (2022, Amazon Prime)
