= Tim Key =

English comedian and poet (born 1976)

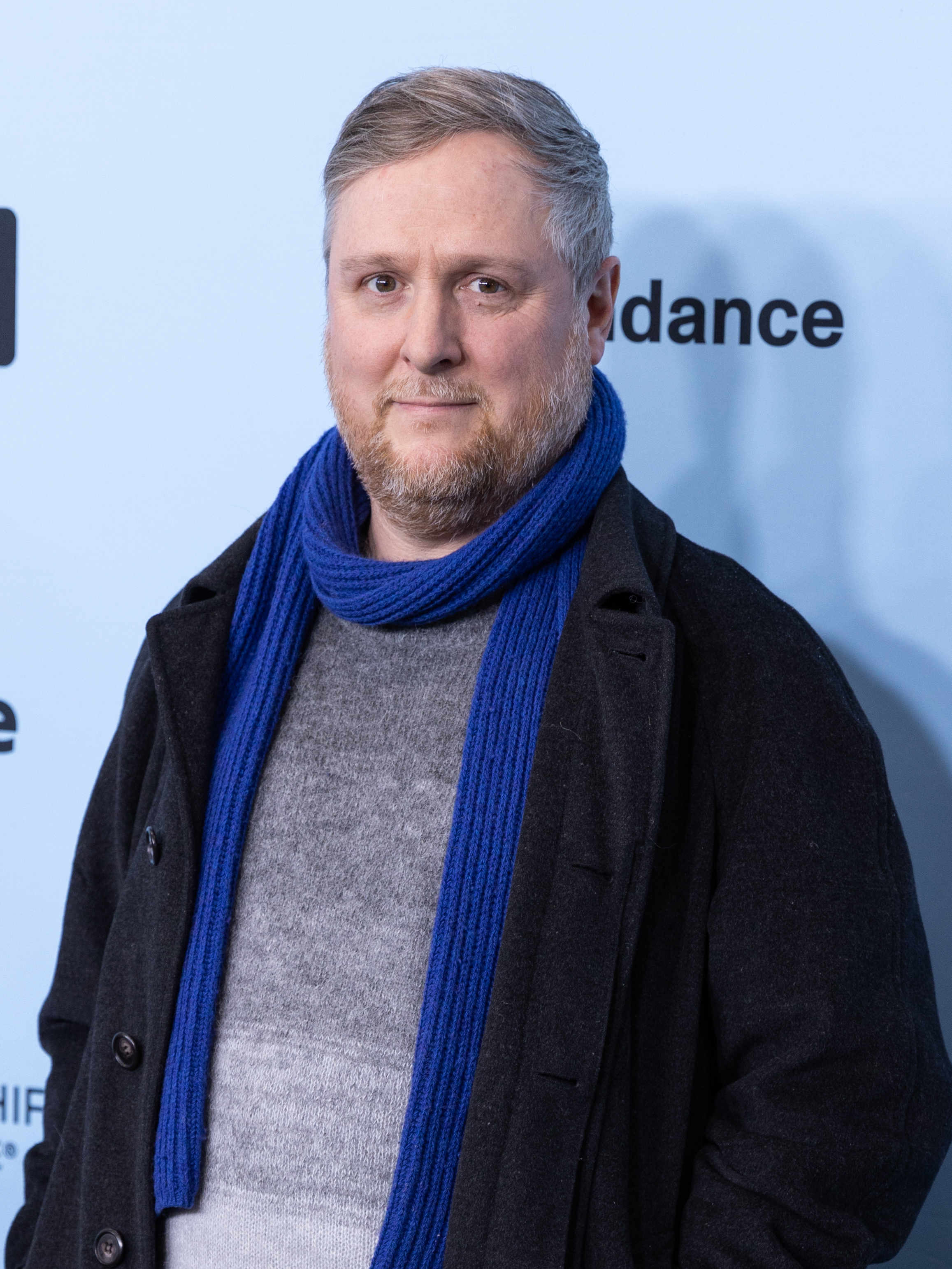
- Key at the Sundance Film Festival in 2025
- Born: Timothy Key; Cambridge, England
- Education: University of Sheffield (BA)
- Occupations: Actor; comedian; poet; radio personality; screenwriter
- Years active: 2001–present
- Website: timkey.co.uk

Timothy Key is an English poet, comedian, actor, and screenwriter. He has performed at the Edinburgh Festival Fringe, both as a solo act and as part of the comedy group Cowards, and plays Sidekick Simon in various Alan Partridge film and television projects. In 2009, he won the Edinburgh Comedy Award, and was nominated for the Malcolm Hardee Award for Comic Originality.

== Early life and education ==
Timothy Key was born in Cambridge and grew up in Impington, Cambridgeshire.

He was educated at Impington Village College before moving on to Hills Road Sixth Form College in Cambridge and then the University of Sheffield, where he studied Russian. After graduation, he returned to Cambridge and joined the Cambridge Footlights, despite not being a student of Cambridge University. There he met Tom Basden, Stefan Golaszewski, and Lloyd Woolf, with whom he formed the sketch group Cowards.

== Career ==
=== Stage ===
Key's first appearance with the Footlights was in the stage production Far Too Happy in 2001. The cast, which included Mark Watson and Sophie Winkleman, took the show to the Edinburgh Festival Fringe and were nominated for the Edinburgh Comedy Award for Best Newcomer. Key has regularly attended Edinburgh ever since, performing in solo shows and collaborations.

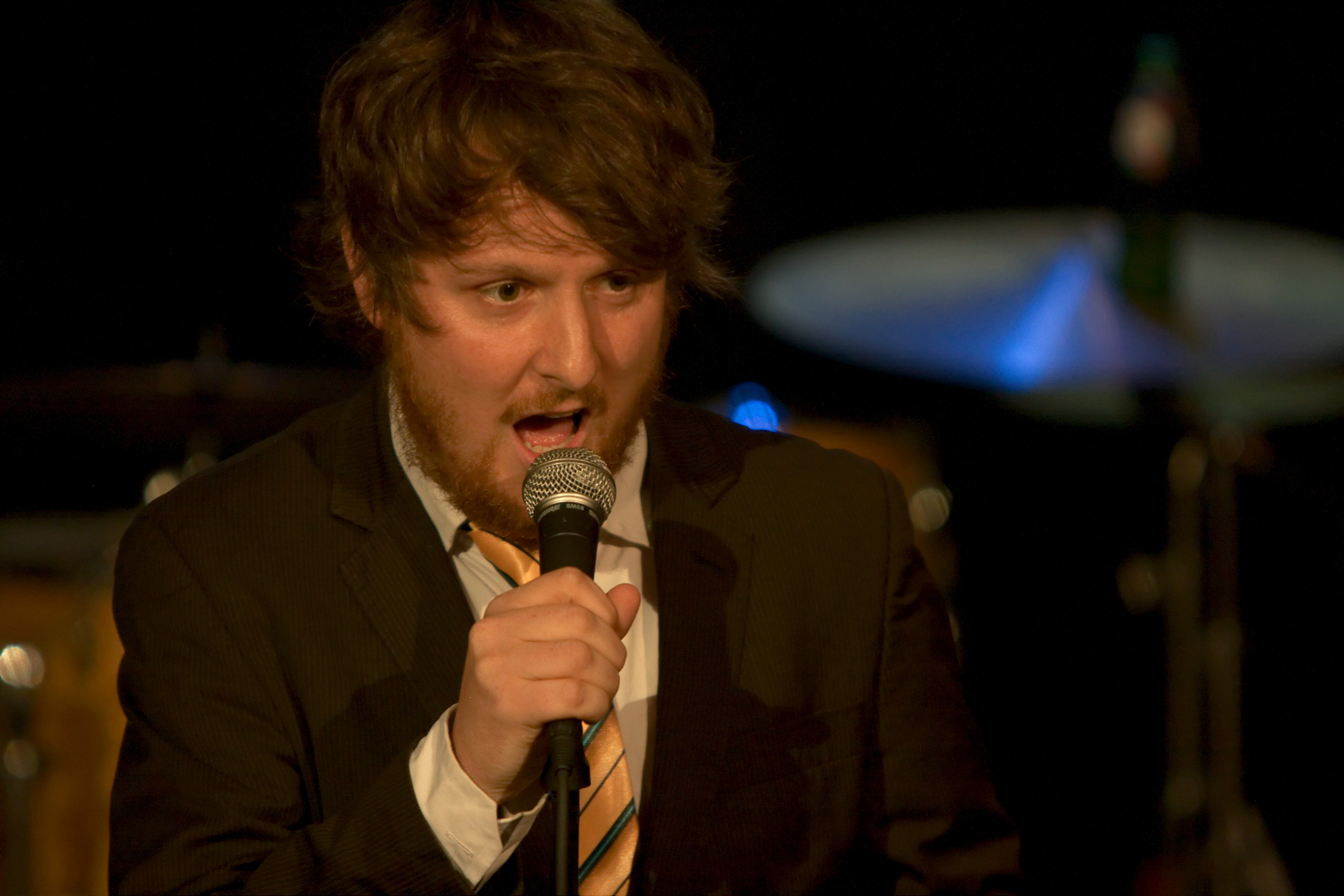
Key performing with The Horne Section in 2010

In 2009, Key's solo poetry show The Slutcracker won the Edinburgh Comedy Award and was nominated for the Malcolm Hardee Award for Comic Originality.He took the show to the Melbourne International Comedy Festival the following year.

Key co-starred in Daniel Kitson's play Tree when it premiered in September 2013 at the Royal Exchange, Manchester. The play then transferred to The Old Vic in 2015. He appeared alongside Paul Ritter and Rufus Sewell in Yasmina Reza's Art at The Old Vic, directed by Matthew Warchus, from December 2016 to February 2017.

Key's comedy show Megadate , in which he reads "deliberately bad" poetry interspersed with black-and-white film, toured from 2017 to 2018.

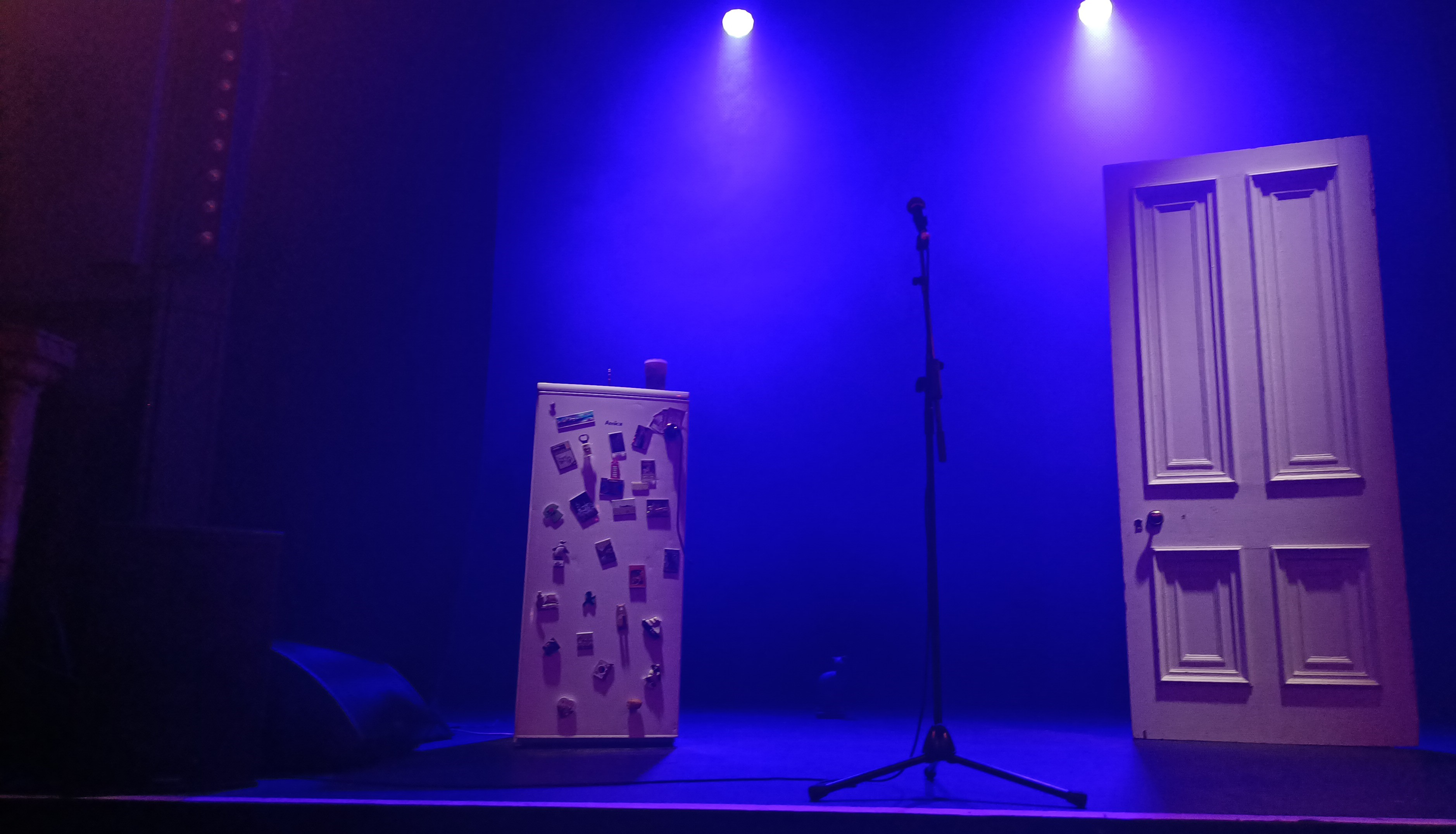
Stage set for Mulberry at the Colchester Arts Centre

In 2023, Key toured his show Mulberry around the UK and Ireland, as well as a run at the SoHo Playhouse in New York City. The show was based on Key's experience of the COVID-19 lockdowns in Britain.

In 2025 and 2026, Key toured a new show entitled Loganberry.

=== Radio ===
Key has regularly been heard on BBC Radio 4 since 2006, when the station commissioned All Bar Luke, a series based on his earlier stage show Luke & Stella. It aired from 2006 to 2008, with a Christmas special in 2009. Key's prior radio projects included Cowards and Mark Watson Makes the World Substantially Better.

In 2010, Key played Duncan in the radio sitcom Party, created by Tom Basden and based on the stage show of the same name. In 2012, he reunited with Basden for Tim Key's Late Night Poetry Programme, a series that features Key reading poetry and Basden providing musical accompaniment, intercut with dialogue between the two. Six series of the show have been broadcast as of 2024.

=== Album ===
Key's first album, Tim Key. With a String Quartet. On a Boat. was released by Invisible Dot / Angular Records in November 2010. It features Key reading poetry backed by a string quartet, with interjections from Basden.

=== Television ===
Key was a contestant on the first series of Britain's Worst Driver and received a car but sold it after a week.

Key first appeared on television in a comic role in 2006's satirical comedy Time Trumpet, as an Eastenders special effects supervisor. The next year, he appeared as himself in Charlie Brooker's Screenwipe, reading poetry. He also appeared in an episode of Saxondale alongside future Mid Morning Matters with Alan Partridge co-star Steve Coogan.

In 2009, Key (along with Mark Watson and Alex Horne) co-created We Need Answers for BBC Four, a comedic quiz show in which celebrities answer questions posed by question-answering text services. It was hosted by Watson, with Horne providing technical support and Key reading questions. As part of the show's bonus online content, the BBC uploaded videos of Key and Watson playing No More Women, a parlour game they had invented several years earlier, with Horne supplying narration. The three reunited in 2020 to play the game as a trio, renaming it No More Jockeys.

In November 2010, Key appeared as "Sidekick Simon" alongside Steve Coogan on Mid Morning Matters with Alan Partridge, an online series based on Coogan's Alan Partridge character. The series was also broadcast on Sky Atlantic in 2012. Key would appear again as Simon in the 2013 film Alan Partridge: Alpha Papa and the BBC series This Time with Alan Partridge and How Are You? It's Alan (Partridge).

In 2013, Key played Greg in the E4 comedy-drama series Gap Year. In 2014, he played Ian in the Inside No. 9 episode "Sardines". His performance was praised, with one journalist calling him "an unsung hero of British comedy". The following year, he was a panellist on the first series of Taskmaster and has been credited as a "Task Consultant" since the show's second series.

Key has also had minor roles in shows such as Skins, Plebs, Life's Too Short, Stag, Peep Show, Brassic and The End of the F***ing World. He has also appeared on panel shows Never Mind the Buzzcocks and Richard Osman's House of Games.

In 2022, Key starred in the BBC Two comedy series The Witchfinder. That year he also appeared as Ray, nemesis and old archery teammate of Paul (Jim Howick) in an episode of friend Tom Basden's BBC1 sitcom, Here We Go.

In 2023, he appeared on the Great Celebrity Bake Off for Stand Up to Cancer, opening up about his experience of being diagnosed with a melanoma.

In 2024, he appeared in the last episode of Inside No. 9 as himself.

In 2025, Key starred as "Ken" in Peacock's The Paper, a follow up and spinoff to The Office.

=== Film ===
Key and Basden collaborated on a short film The One and Only Herb McGwyer Plays Wallis Island in 2007. The film won Best UK Short at the 2007 Edinburgh Film Festival, and was nominated for a 2008 BAFTA under the Best Short Film category. It was later turned into the feature length film The Ballad of Wallis Island (2025). In 2012, Key collaborated with director J. van Tulleken on one of 16 short films to have won production funding through British Film Institute Shorts. The resultant film was a black comedy entitled Anthony, starring Key and Basden, in which Cambridge Footlights Key played Santa Claus. Key was also in Days of the Bagnold Summer (2019) directed by fellow Cambridge Footlights member Simon Bird.

Key reprised his role as Sidekick Simon for Steve Coogan's Alan Partridge film Alpha Papa, released in August 2013. Also in 2013, he appeared in the Richard Ayoade film The Double. In 2019, he again starred alongside Coogan in Greed, playing the character of Sam. In 2022, he played Commissioner Harrold Scott in See How They Run. In 2025, he played Pigeon Man in Bong Joon Ho's Mickey 17.

=== Writing ===
Key has written seven books. The first, Instructions, Guidelines, Tutelage, Suggestions, Other Suggestions and Examples Etc.: An Attempted Book by Tim Key. (And Conversations / Descriptions / A Piece About a Moth), was published in 2009. The second, 25 Poems, 3 Recipes and 32 Other Suggestions (An Inventory) was published in 2011. The third, The Incomplete Tim Key, was published by Canongate Books in 2011.

In 2020, Key collaborated with illustrator Emily Juniper to create He Used Thought As a Wife (An Anthology of Poems and Conversations from Inside). Published by Utter and Press, the book chronicles Key's experiences during the UK's first COVID-19 lockdown. A sequel, Here We Go Round the Mulberry Bush (An Anthology of Poems and Conversations from Outside), was released in 2022.

Key released a new poetry anthology, "Chapters", in February 2024. Poetic Justice noted its humour and "subversive focus on the contemporary world". In 2025 Key released L.A. Baby, a semi-fictionalised collection of poems and conversations charting his trip to Los Angeles; it was critically praised for both its comedic and more serious poems.

== Credits ==
=== Film ===
| Year | Title | Role | Notes |
|---|---|---|---|
| 2007 | The One and Only Herb McGwyer Plays Wallis Island | Charles | Short film |
| 2007 | Christmas at the Riviera | Gary | TV movie |
| 2009 | The Transaction | The Poet | Short film |
| 2010 | The Honeymoon Suite | Samuel | Short film |
| 2011 | One Day | Customer | |
| 2013 | I Give It a Year | Alan | |
| 2013 | Alan Partridge: Alpha Papa | 'Sidekick' Simon Denton | |
| 2013 | The Double | Care Worker | |
| 2013 | The Harry Hill Movie | Toilet Attendant | |
| 2013 | Very Few Fish | Jimbo | TV movie |
| 2014 | Anthony | Santa | Short film |
| 2014 | Two Films About Loneliness | Jonathan Smallman (voice) | Short film |
| 2014 | Not now Keith! | Keith | Short film |
| 2017 | The Overcoat | The Narrator | Short film |
| 2018 | Wonderdate | Man | TV short |
| 2019 | Days of the Bagnold Summer | Dale | |
| 2019 | Greed | Sam | |
| 2020 | Love Wedding Repeat | Sidney | |
| 2020 | Talk Radio | Danny Mallard | Short film |
| 2022 | See How They Run | Commissioner Harold Scott | |
| 2023 | Wicked Little Letters | Father Ambrose | |
| 2025 | Mickey 17 | Pigeon Man | |
| 2025 | The Ballad of Wallis Island | Charles | Also co-writer |

=== Television ===
| Year | Title | Role | Notes |
|---|---|---|---|
| 2002 | Britain's Worst Driver | Himself (series 1); "Timid Tim" | Eliminated second |
| 2006 | Saxondale | Promotions Guy | Episode: "Mice" |
| 2006 | Time Trumpet | Special Effects Crew – Eastenders | Episode: "Witness to a Wedding" |
| 2007 | Annually Retentive | Kim | Episode: "Episode #2.5" |
| 2007 | Angelo's | Steve | Episode: "Episode #1.4" |
| 2009 | Cowards | | Also writer |
| 2010–2016 | Mid Morning Matters with Alan Partridge | Sidekick Simon | Main cast |
| 2011 | Life's Too Short | News Reporter | Episode: "Episode #1.2" |
| 2012 | Skins | Dr. O'Dwyer | Episode: "Mini and Franky" |
| 2012 | Games On | Dan | Episode: "Tent" |
| 2012 | A Young Doctor's Notebook | Pyotr the Patient | Episode: "Episode Three" |
| 2012 | 8 Out of 10 Cats Does Countdown | Guest in the Dictionary Corner | Episode: "Episode #1.1" |
| 2013 | Chickens | Thomas | Episode: "Men on Leave" |
| 2014 | Inside No. 9 | Ian | Episode: "Sardines" |
| 2014 | Playhouse Presents | Jonah | Episode: "The Dog Thrower" |
| 2014 | Plebs | Mushki | Episode: "The New Slave" |
| 2015 | Cradle to Grave | Stutely | 2 episodes |
| 2015 | Together | Joseph the Policeman | 4 episodes |
| 2015 | Peep Show | Jerry | 3 episodes |
| 2015–present | Taskmaster | Himself (series 1); Task consultant (series 2–) | 6 episodes (as Himself) |
| 2016 | Stag | Aitken | Episode: "Episode 1" |
| 2016 | Year Friends | Peter Priest | 3 episodes |
| 2016–2017 | Drunk History: UK | Various Characters | 5 episodes |
| 2017–2021 | Pls Like | James Wirm | |
| 2017 | Gap Year | Greg | |
| 2017 | Comedy Playhouse | The Sheriff of Nottingham | Episode: "Tim Vine Travels in Time" |
| 2017 | Zapped | Sextus | Episode: "Showtime" |
| 2017 | Detectorists | Tim | 3 episodes |
| 2017 | Random Acts | Regular | Episode: "Episode #4.3" |
| 2018 | Trust | Gavin | Episode: "John, Chapter 11" |
| 2019–2021 | This Time with Alan Partridge | 'Sidekick' Simon Denton | Main cast |
| 2019 | Brassic | Vortex | 2 episodes |
| 2019 | The Reluctant Landlord | Tommy | Episode: "Love Is in the Air" |
| 2019 | The End of the F***ing World | Gus | 2 episodes |
| 2021 | The Irregulars | Gregson | 2 episodes |
| 2021 | Stath Lets Flats | Howard | Episode: "Here Comes The Steven" |
| 2021 | Cryptids | | Episode: "Owlman" |
| 2022 | After Life | Rude Date | Episode: "Episode #3.4" |
| 2022 | The Witchfinder | Gideon Bannister | |
| 2022 | Richard Osman's House of Games | Himself | Episode: "Episodes #6.46 to #6.50 |
| 2022 | Here We Go | Ray | Episode: "Dad's Bronze Medal" |
| 2022 | The Train | | |
| 2023 | The Great Stand Up to Cancer Bake Off | Himself / Contestant | Charity special |
| 2024 | Inside No. 9 | Himself | Episode: "Plodding On" |
| 2024 | Funny Woman | Lawyer | Episode: |
| 2025 | The Paper | Ken Davies | Main cast |
| 2025 | How Are You? It's Alan (Partridge) | Sidekick Simon | Main cast |
| 2026 | New Zealand Spy | Hilton | Episode 3: "The Informant" |

== Bibliography ==
- Instructions, Guidelines, Tutelage, Suggestions, Other Suggestions and Examples Etc.: An Attempted Book By Tim Key. (And Conversations/ Descriptions/ A Piece About A Moth). The Invisible Dot Ltd, 2009. ISBN 978-0-9553703-3-5
- The Incomplete Tim Key. Canongate Books Ltd, 2011. ISBN 978-0-85786-118-4
- 25 Poems, 3 Recipes and 32 Other Suggestions (An Inventory). The Invisible Dot Ltd, 2011. ISBN 978-0-9553703-6-6
- He Used Thought As A Wife (An Anthology of Poems and Conversations from Inside.) "Utter" and Press, 2020. ISBN 9781916222649
- Here We Go Round The Mulberry Bush (An Anthology of Poems and Conversations from Outside.) "Utter" and Press, 2022. ISBN 9781916222663
- Chapters "Utter" and Press, 2023. ISBN 9781916222687
- L.A. Baby! "Utter" and Press, 2025. ISBN 1916222692
