= Stefan Golaszewski =

British writer, performer and director

Stefan Golaszewski (born November 1980) is a British writer, performer and director. He is part of the comedy troupe Cowards and is the writer and creator of BAFTA-winning sitcoms Him & Her and Mum.

== Early life and education ==
Golaszewski was born in November 1980. His paternal grandfather, who was Polish, emigrated to the UK at the end of World War II. Golaszewski was president of the Footlights while studying at the University of Cambridge.

== Career ==
In 2009, Golaszewski wrote, performed in and co-directed a pilot for BBC Three called Things Talk. As a director, he won the if.comedy Best Newcomer Award with Tom Basden for Won't Say Anything in 2007 and again in 2009 with Jonny Sweet for Mostly About Arthur. His one-man play Stefan Golaszewski Speaks about a Girl He Once Loved was performed at the Edinburgh Festival in 2008. Directed by Phillip Breen, it picked up a host of five-star reviews. This was later performed with another play Stefan Golaszewski Is a Widower at the Bush Theatre in London's Shepherd's Bush, again to critical acclaim. The two plays have since been published as The Stefan Golaszewski Plays.

Golaszewski is a part of the comedy troupe Cowards, which also includes Tim Key, Tom Basden and Lloyd Woolf. They made a TV series for BBC Four, and their second Radio 4 series came out in late 2008.

Golaszewski's sitcom Him & Her, starring Russell Tovey and Sarah Solemani, aired on BBC Three for four series from 2010 to 2014 and won the 2014 British Academy Television Award for Best Situation Comedy. Golaszewski wrote Sex with a Stranger, staged in early 2012 and starring Tovey and Jaime Winstone.

His second sitcom, Mum, starring Lesley Manville and Peter Mullan, premiered in 2016. Its second series was screened in 2018 and the third and final series was screened in 2019.

His four-part drama Marriage aired in August 2022 starring Nicola Walker and Sean Bean. The series received mostly very good reviews from critics, but mixed reviews from viewers.

His series Babies began filming in England in 2025, and premiered on BBC One on 30 March 2026, alongside the release of all 6 episodes on BBC iPlayer.

== Credits ==
Year	Title	Notes
2009	Cowards	3 episodes; also actor
2009	Things Talk	Television film; also director
2010–2013	Him & Her	25 episodes; also executive producer
2016–2019	Mum	18 episodes; also executive producer
2022	Marriage	4 episodes; also director and executive producer
2026	Babies	6 episodes; also director and executive producer
