= Tom Basden =

English actor and writer

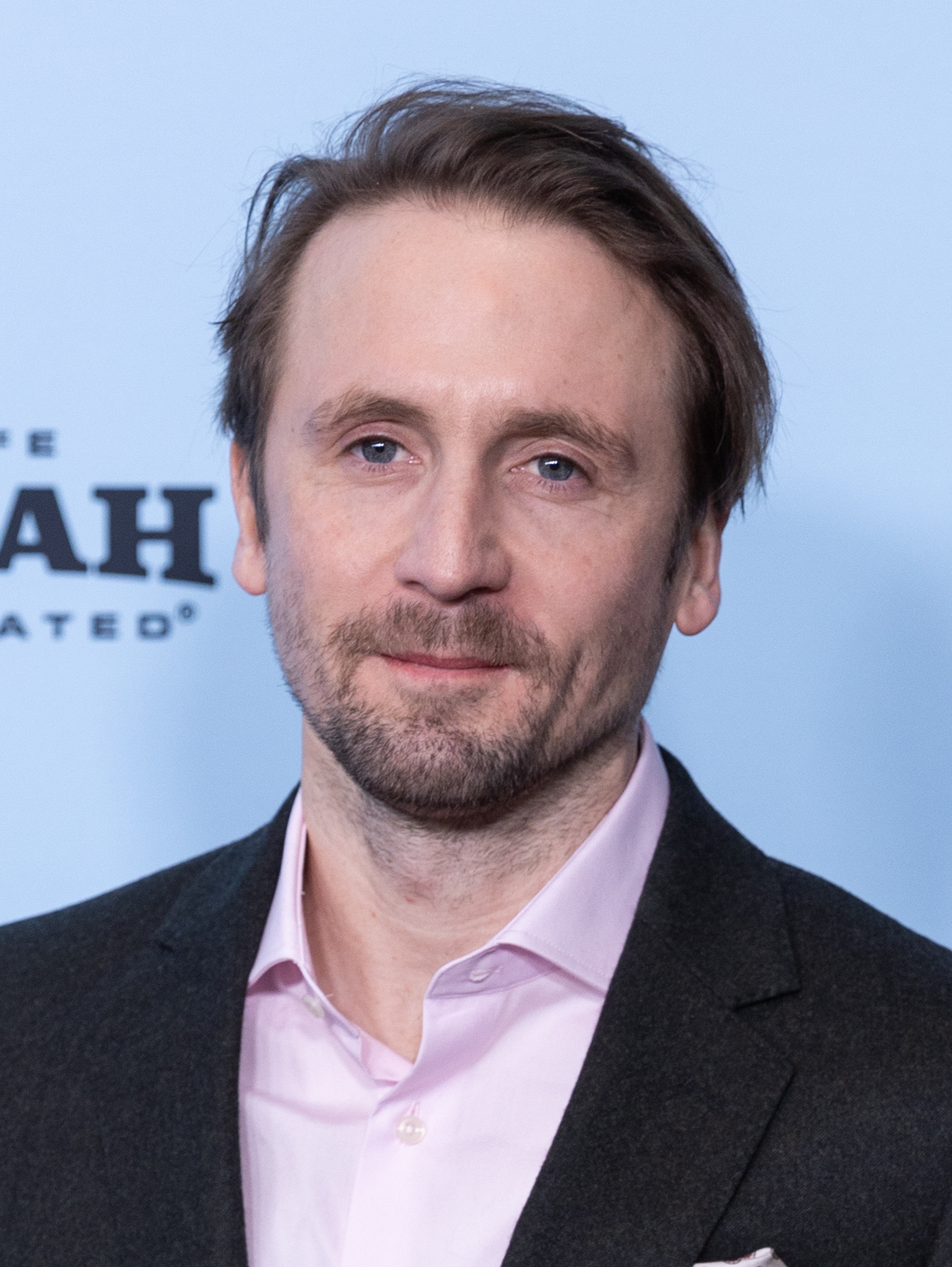
- Basden in 2025
- Born: Thomas William Basden; 30 November 1980 (age 45); Sutton, Greater London, England
- Occupations: Actor, comedian, writer
- Years active: 2006–present

Thomas William Basden (born 30 November 1980) is an English actor, writer, comedian, and musician. He is best known for co-creating and starring in Plebs, which won the Royal Television Society award for Best Scripted Comedy in 2014. He was nominated for Best Newcomer at the 2007 Edinburgh Comedy Awards and is a member of the sketch group Cowards. He co-wrote and starred in the 2025 film The Ballad of Wallis Island.

== Education ==
Thomas William Basden was born in Sutton, Greater London. He was educated at King's College School, in Wimbledon in South-West London, where he was in the same year as fellow actors Khalid Abdalla and Ben Barnes; followed by Pembroke College, Cambridge. He was vice president of Cambridge Footlights and his contemporaries included Stefan Golaszewski, Sarah Solemani, Tim Key (who pretended to be studying for a Ph.D at Cambridge to be part of a Footlights production) and Dan Stevens.

== Career ==
=== Performance ===
Basden's one-man show at the 2007 Edinburgh Festival Fringe, Tom Basden Won't Say Anything, won the if.comedy award for Best Newcomer. He starred with Tim Key in the 2007 short film The One and Only Herb McGwyer Plays Wallis Island, which won the UK Film Council Kodak Award for Best British Short Film. The short was expanded into a feature film, The Ballad of Wallis Island, which Basden and Key also starred in, alongside Carey Mulligan, and which was produced by Baby Cow.

In 2008, Basden appeared as the resident musician for the second series of the BBC Radio 4 comedy show Mark Watson Makes the World Substantially Better, replacing Tim Minchin.

He was a guest panellist on the BBC Two comedy show Never Mind the Buzzcocks in November 2009.

Since 2012, he has appeared as Key's musical sidekick in the Radio 4 comedy Tim Key's Late Night Poetry Programme.

Since 2013, Basden has co-written and appeared in the ITV ancient-Rome sitcom Plebs. He played a lead role the 2013 BBC Two comedy thriller The Wrong Mans. He co-wrote the third and fifth episodes of series one, and wrote both episodes of series two which aired the following year.

He played Dan the sound engineer in the 2016 film David Brent: Life on the Road, and Jeremy Corbyn in the 2018 Royal Wedding special of The Windsors. He had a main role as Matt in the Netflix comedy series After Life. He starred as Mr Short in the 2022 Netflix young adult sci-fi series The Last Bus.

=== Writing ===
Basden's 2010 play Party, about a group of university students holding a meeting to found their own political party, was performed at the Arts Theatre in London. Brian Logan, writing for The Guardian, gave it a four out of a possible five stars and describing it "an idiosyncratic and highly enjoyable piece performed beautifully by a crack cast of upcoming comics", while Dominic Cavendish for The Daily Telegraph called it "astute (and) stingingly amusing". A radio adaptation of the play produced by Julia McKenzie was broadcast on Radio 4 for three series and a Christmas special from 2010 to 2018. In addition to writing the adaptation, Basden appeared, alongside Tim Key, Jonny Sweet, Anna Crilly and Katy Wix.

His play Joseph K, based on Franz Kafka's novel The Trial and starring Tim Key, was longlisted for the 2011 Evening Standard Theatre Awards Most Promising Playwright: it also received positive reviews from The Guardian and The Daily Telegraph.

In 2011 he wrote There Is a War, starring himself and Phoebe Fox, for the National Theatre's Double Feature.

Basden co-wrote the Channel 4 sitcom Fresh Meat, which earned him a nomination for the 2012 BAFTA Craft Awards Break-Through Talent Award.

With Tim Key, Basden co-wrote the 2025 feature film, The Ballad of Wallis Island. Basden wrote and performed the music for the film, and released an album with co-star Carey Mulligan credited to 'McGwyer Mortimer', the fictional band they perform as.

Basden writes and acts in the BBC Sitcom Here We Go as Robin Hankey, which features special guests including Allison Steadman, Katherine Parkinson, Jim Howick and Tim Key.

== Filmography ==
=== Film ===
Year	Title	Role	Notes
2016	David Brent: Life on the Road	Dan Harvey	
2022	Venice at Dawn	Stephen	
2025	The Ballad of Wallis Island	Herb McGwyer/Chris Pinner	Also writer

=== Television ===
Year	Title	Actor	Writer	Creator	Role	Notes
2006	Vital Signs	Yes			Mr Woodley	One episode
2006	Jam & Jerusalem	Yes			Kira's Dad	
2006–2008	Star Stories	Yes			Various roles	Fifteen episodes
2007	Living with Two People You Like Individually... But Not as a Couple	Yes			Martin	TV Movie
2007	Ronni Ancona & Co	Yes			Various roles	One episode
2007	Hyperdrive	Yes			Lallakkiss	One episode
2007	After You've Gone	Yes			Mike	One episode
2008	Comedy Cuts	Yes			Self (stand-up)	One episode ITV2 comedy showcase
2008	No Heroics	Yes			Fusebox	One episode
2009	Cowards	Yes	Yes	Yes	Various roles	Three episodes Co-written and co-created with Cowards
2009	Things Talk	Yes			Coat, Garlic (voice)	TV Movie
2009	Brave Young Men	Yes	Yes		Jamie Husband	Co-written with Sam Leifer
2010	Dark Relic	Yes			Robert	TV Movie
2010	The Armstrong & Miller Show	Yes	Yes	Yes	Various characters	
2010	Me and My Monsters		Yes			Two episodes
2011	Comedy Lab		Yes	Yes		"Rick and Peter" episode
2012	Party	Yes	Yes	Yes	Simon	
2012	Starlings	Yes			Job Advisor	One episode
2012	Games On	Yes			Paul Fairweather	
2012	Peep Show	Yes	Yes		Customer (uncredited)	One episode: "Big Mad Andy"
2013–2019	Plebs	Yes	Yes	Yes	Aurelius	35 episodes
2013	Derek	Yes			Autograph Expert	
2013–2014	The Wrong Mans	Yes	Yes		Noel	Two episodes co-written with Mathew Baynton and James Corden
2013	Very Few Fish		Yes	Yes		Not commissioned
2014	W1A	Yes			Dan Shephard	Three episodes
2011–2016	Fresh Meat		Yes			Four episodes
2017	Gap Year	Yes	Yes	Yes	Trainee Monk, Full Moon Partygoer (uncredited)	
2017	Quacks	Yes			John	Six episodes
2018	Damned	Yes			Aidan	One episode
2018	The Windsors	Yes			Jeremy Corbyn	One episode
2018	Women on the Verge	Yes			Daniel	One episode
2018	The Reluctant Landlord	Yes			Simon	One episode
2019	Island of Dreams	Yes			Daniel Craig	One episode
2019–2022	After Life	Yes			Matt	18 episodes
2020	Pandemonium	Yes	Yes	Yes	Robin	Pilot episode of Here We Go
2020–2024	Mandy	Yes			Benefits Advisor	Six episodes
2021	Dodo	Yes			Mr Turner, Mr Ralph, Additional Voices	Animated series 14 episodes
2022–present	Here We Go	Yes	Yes	Yes	Robin	Also composer
2022	Plebs: Soldiers of Rome	Yes	Yes	Yes	Aurelius	TV Movie Co-written with Sam Leifer
2022	The Last Bus	Yes			Mr Short	Three episodes
2022	Man vs. Bee	Yes			Police Officer	Four episodes
2023	Ghosts	Yes	Plague Person	Six Episodes	Cartwright	One episode
2026	Alley Cats	Yes			Ponce	Animated series; voice role Six episodes

=== Short film ===
Year	Title	Actor	Writer	Creator	Role	Notes
2007	The One and Only Herb McGwyer Plays Wallis Island	Yes	Yes	Yes	Herb McGwyer	Nominated for the BAFTA Award for Best Short Film
2010	The Boot Sale	Yes			The Hunk	
2010	Trouble Brewing	Yes			Matt	
2012	Worm	Yes			Philip	
2013	The Return of Brent	Yes			Dan	
2014	Anthony	Yes			Anthony	

== Discography ==
Year	Title	Artist	Record label
2025	The Ballad of Wallis Island	Tom Basden & Carey Mulligan	Decca Records

== Awards and nominations ==
Year	Award	Category	Work	Result
2007	Edinburgh Comedy Awards	Best Newcomer	"Won't Say Anything"	Won
2008	British Academy Film Awards	Best Short Film	The One and Only Herb McGwyer Plays Wallis Island	Nominated
2008	Chortle Awards	Best Full Show	"Won't Say Anything"	Won
2008	Chortle Awards	Breakthrough Act		Nominated
2011	Evening Standard Award	Charles Wintour Award for Most Promising Playwright	Joseph K	Won
2012	BAFTA Craft Awards	Break-Through Talent Award	Fresh Meat	Nominated
2025	British Independent Film Awards	Best British Independent Film	The Ballad of Wallis Island	Nominated
2025	British Independent Film Awards	Best Joint Lead Performance	The Ballad of Wallis Island	Won
2025	British Independent Film Awards	Best Screenplay	The Ballad of Wallis Island	Won
2025	British Independent Film Awards	Best Debut Screenwriter	The Ballad of Wallis Island	Nominated
2025	British Independent Film Awards	Best Original Music	The Ballad of Wallis Island	Won
