= Ellie White =

English actress (born 1989)

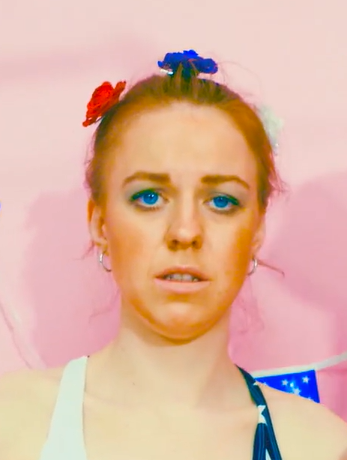
- Ellie White in costume in 2016
- Born: 14 June 1989 (age 37); Oxford, England
- Education: University of Bristol
- Occupations: Actress, comedian
- Years active: 2013–present
- Known for: The Windsors; Stath Lets Flats; Ellie & Natasia

Ellie White (born 14 June 1989) is an English actress and comedian. She is best known for playing Princess Beatrice of York in the British royal family parody The Windsors (2016–2020) and Katia in the sitcom Stath Lets Flats (2018–2021).

In 2022, Ellie co-wrote and starred in the BBC sketch show Ellie & Natasia, alongside her comedy partner Natasia Demetriou. The show won Best TV Sketch Show at the Comedy.co.uk Awards 2022.

== Early life ==
White is from Oxford. Her father is journalist Jim White.

White attended the University of Bristol, and was a member of the Bristol Revunions, graduating in 2010.

== Career ==
=== 2012–2015: Early Career at the Edinburgh Fringe ===
From 2012 to 2014, White performed at the Dot venue for nights including their New Wave night, Halloween night and The Circus. The Circus was named one of The Times "12 must see comedians at the Edinburgh Fringe 2014", one of WhatsOnStage's "Our picks of the Fringe and EIF".

In 2013, White took her comedy stand-up to the Edinburgh Festival Fringe. After the festival, White landed her first TV appearances on the Channel 4 TV series Jamie Demetriou's Comedy Blaps (having met Demetriou through his performances in the Bristol Revunions), on BBC Three's Live at the Electric, and on BBC Radio 4's Fresh From the Fringe.

In 2014, White took her second show to the fringe. The show was a character comedy, where White performed six characters over an hour duration. The Guardian gave it a mixed review describing it as "an eye-catching solo debut, too – if not quite eye-catching enough to distinguish it from many other (mainly female) character-comedy showcases in a similar vein".

In 2015, White and Natasia Demetriou took their show Natasia Demetriou And Ellie White Are Mother And Baby to the Edinburgh Festival.

=== 2015–2016: People Time, 2016: Year of Friends ===
In 2015, White participated in the Comedy Feed sketch show pilot, People Time on BBC Three alongside Natasia Demetriou, Jamie Demetriou, Daran Johnson, Al Roberts, Liam Williams, Claudia O'Doherty. The Guardian said that "someone needs to invest big in People Time because it should be on television and soon". Comedian Adam Buxton said that it was the "best comedy thing I’ve seen in a long while". Despite its good reviews, it did not get commissioned. Continuing with the cast (minus O'Doherty), he co-created the web series 2016: Year Friends. Each episode was written by a different member of the troupe. The premise of the series is that a group of friends get together and make some new year's resolutions. The show is influenced by British mocumentaries including The Office and That Peter Kay Thing, as well as the nascent reality TV genre.

In 2015, White landed a regular role in series 2 of House of Fools.

=== 2016–Present: The Windsors, Stath Lets Flats, Ellie & Natasia, The Other One ===
From 2016 to 2023, White portrayed the character of Princess Beatrice of York for three seasons of the spoof royal comedy The Windsors, alongside actress Celeste Dring, who plays her royal sister Princess Eugenie.

In 2017, White collaborated Vicki Pepperdine on Summer Comedy Shorts: Vicki Pepperdine & Ellie White's Summer for Sky Arts. The film was about a female Morris dancing troupe in the English countryside. Ellie played the character of Anne.

From 2018 to 2021, White starred in Jamie Demetriou's comedy sitcom Stath Lets Flats. She plays Katia, Stath's (Jamie Demetriou) love interest and Sophie's (Natasia Demetriou) best friend.

In 2019, White teamed up with long-time stand-up comedy partner Natasia Demetriou to make a pilot of the comedy sketch show Ellie & Natasia for the BBC. The Guardian described the show as "a fiercely funny sketch show you’ll watch over and over" with "a strong seam of feminist fury running through". The sketches explore, amongst other things, how women feel and behave in modern society. After three years, in 2022, White and Demetriou released a series of the sketch show for BBC Three. Some of the cast members from Stath Lets Flats also appeared in the series, including Katy Wix and Jamie Demetriou. The Guardian gave the show a positive review, describing it as "silly" and "concise" and "makes a strong case that there is plenty of life in the British sketch show yet".

In 2020, White played the main role of Cathy in the BBC comedy series The Other One, and starred alongside Lee Mack in the BBC sitcom Semi-Detached.

In 2021, White played a voice-only role as "Radio" in the Sky One television comedy series Bloods about two paramedics.

== Live performance ==
Year	Title	Role	Venue	Festival	Notes	Ref
	The Miser	Marian				
	Ricky Whittington and His Cat	Alice				
	Dinner	Wynne	Alma Tavern Theatre, Bristol			
	Small Family Business	Harriet	Wynston Theatre			
	And We Drown	Vivienne	Burton Taylor Theatre, Oxford			
	Sanity Clause	Charlie	Pegasus Theatre			
	Bristol Revunions	Writer/ Performer	Just the Tonic, Edinburgh	Edinburgh Festival Fringe		
	Bristol Revunions	Writer/ Performer	Pleasance Courtyard	Edinburgh Festival Fringe		
2013	Ellie and Oscar Share a Time	Writer/ Performer	The Voodoo Rooms	Edinburgh Festival Fringe	With Oscar Jenkyn-Jones	
2014	Ellie White: Humans		Viva Mexico	Edinburgh Festival Fringe		
2014	The Circus		Assembly George Square Gardens	Edinburgh Festival Fringe	Cabaret show	
2015	Natasia Demetriou and Ellie White are Mother and Baby		The Banshee Labyrinth	Edinburgh Festival Fringe	With Natasia Demetriou	
2015	Cardinal Burns Presents		Pleasance Courtyard	Edinburgh Festival Fringe	Cabaret show	

== Filmography ==
=== Film ===
Year	Title	Role	Notes	Ref
2014	Intervention	Sarah	Short films	
2016	Bin	Honey (voice)	Short films	
2018	Plankton	Lois (voice)	Short films	
2018	Christopher Bliss: Handcuffs for Poltergeists	Karen Wimby	Short films	
2019	Luger	Helen	Short films	
2019	Anima	Dancer	Short films	
2022	We Are Not Alone	Sredstev		
2023	Wonka	Gwennie, Mistress of the Keys		
2025	Bridget Jones: Mad About the Boy	Francesca		

=== Television ===
Year	Title	Role	Other Role	Channel	Notes	Ref
2009	Children of Herne	Girl			Mini-series	
2013	Jamie Demetriou: Channel 4 Comedy Blaps	Potential buyer		Channel 4	As Eleanor White	
2013	Live at the Electric	Techie		BBC Three	Series 3, Episode 1	
2015	Mr. Bean: Funeral	Mourner			TV short	
2015	House of Fools	Rachel		BBC Two	Series 2; 6 episodes	
2015	Glitchy	Various		ITV2	Episodes 1–5	
2015	Comedy Feeds: People Time	Various	Writer	BBC Three	Pilot	
2015	Lolly Adefope's Christmas	Actor		Sky Arts		
2016	Comedy Feeds: Limbo	Various / Alice				
2016	Halloween Comedy Shorts: Jamie Demetriou's Horror: Oh God	Rose		Sky Arts		
2016	@elevenish	Various	Writer	ITV2	Episodes 1, 4, 7, Special (writer); Episodes 1, 4, 6, 7, Special (actor)	
2016	Limbo	Alice		BBC Three	BBC Comedy Feeds pilot	
2016–2017	Murder in Successville	Cara Delevingne	Writer (additional material)	BBC Three	Series 2, Episode 3	
2016–2017	Murder in Successville	Björk	Writer (additional material)	BBC Three	Series 3, Episode 1	
2016–2017	Murder in Successville	Cara Delevingne	Writer (additional material)	BBC Three	Series 3, Episodes 1, 6	
2016–2017	Class Dismissed	Various		CBBC	Series 2, Episodes 1, 3; Series 3, 15 episodes	
2016–2018	Damned	Phone caller (voice)		Channel 4	Series 1 & 2; 10 episodes	
2016–2023	The Windsors	Princess Beatrice		Channel 4	21 episodes	
2017	Inside No. 9	Anya		BBC Two	Episode: "The Bill"	
2017	Carters Get Rich	Shauna		Sky One	Episode 4: "Trent vs Tony"	
2017	Summer Comedy Shorts: Ellie White & Vicki Pepperdine's Summer	Anne	Writer, associate producer	Sky Arts	Short	
2017	Crackanory	Greta		U&Dave	Series 4, Episode 5: "Proxy Lady"	
2017	Big Field	Various		BBC Three	Series 3, Episodes 1–10	
2017–2018	Pls Like	Polly Sprong		BBC Three	Series 1, Episode 4; Series 2, Episodes 5, 6	
2017-2019	Horrible Histories	Various		CBBC	Series 7; Episodes 3, 5, 8, 9, 10, 11, 12, Special; Series 8, Episodes 2, 3, 4, 5, 8, and 4 specials	
2017, 2020, 2022	The Other One	Cathy		BBC	Series 1 & 2; 12 episodes including pilot (2017)	
2018	Rose Matafeo: Temp	Diane			Episode 2, Comedy Blaps	
2018–2021	Stath Lets Flats	Katia		Channel 4	Series 1, 2, "Lockdowned", 3, Comic Relief Special (11 episodes)	
2019	This Time with Alan Partridge	Dee Gilhooly		BBC One	Series 1; Episode 5	
2019	Timewasters	Janice		ITV2	Series 2; 6 episodes	
2019	Drifters	Lois (voice)		Channel 4	Episode: "Got to Get Back"	
2019- 2020	8 Out of 10 Cats Does Countdown	"Mum's the Word" (with Natasia Demetriou)		Channel 4	Series 17; Episode 4 (in Dictionary Corner); Series 19, Special	
2019- 2020	Semi-Detached	April		BBC Two	6 episodes (inc. pilot)	
2019, 2022, 2026	Ellie & Natasia	Various	Writer	BBC Two	10 episodes (including 2019 Pilot)	
2020	Reasons to Be Cheerful with Matt Lucas	Lemily		Channel 4	Mini-series; Episode 4	
2021	Beings	(unknown)	Writer		Episode: "Owlman"	
2021	Black Death	Malkyn / Lady Orella			Mini-series; 2 episodes	
2021–2022	Bloods	Radio (voice)		Sky One	Series 1 & 2; 11 episodes	
2022	The Dumping Ground	Jen		CBBC	Series 9; Episode 13: "Face to Face"	
2022	The Witchfinder	Karen		BBC Two	Series 1; Episode 5	
2022	Live at the Moth Club	Cress Truss		U&Dave	Episodes 1, 2, 3, 5	
2022	Live at the Moth Club		Writer	U&Dave	Episodes 1, 3	
2022	We Are Not Alone	Sredstev		U&Dave		
2023	A Whole Lifetime with Jamie Demetriou	Chesha / Ellin		Netflix	Pilot episode	
2023	The Great	Merchant			Episode: "You the People"	
2023	Black Mirror	Kate Cezar		Netflix	Episode: "Loch Henry"	
2023	Smothered	Melissa			Series 1; Episode 2	
2024	The Completely Made-Up Adventures of Dick Turpin	Nell		Apple TV	6 episodes	
2024	Richard Osman's House of Games	Herself - contestant		BBC Two	Series 8; 5 episodes (week 6)	
2026	LOL: Last One Laughing UK	Intimacy coordinator		Amazon Prime	Series 2; Episode 5	
2026	Living the Dream		Writer			

=== Online ===
Year	Title	Role	Other Role	Platform	Notes	Ref
2016	2016: Year Friends	Ellie	Writer (all episodes), Director (episodes 5, 11)	Vimeo	12 episodes	
2016	Mum's the Word	Beverley	Writer		1 episode	
2016	Top Ten	Small Boulla	Writer	BBC Three (online)	Episode	
2017	Sexy American Girls (Money Is the Life)	Small Rebecca		Comic Relief Originals	1 episode	
2017	Revived	Dani B	Writer		TV pilot taster	
2017	Lamp Lady	Sarah			1 episode	
2018	Three Cool Days	Lizzie		YouTube	Episode 3: "Basketball"	
2018	From Russia with Lou & Annie	Self		YouTube	Episode 8: "Matchday 8"	
2018	Walk in My Feet with Dr Giles Podan	Wife (voice)				
2020	Ready, Okay	Virshlam				
2020	Webidate	Tessa			Episode 1: "Tessa"	
2020	Nü Media	Sarah		YouTube	1 episode	
2020	The Paddock - Remote Comedy from the Paddock	Self	Writer	YouTube	Episode 2	
2020	Petrichor	Argentina			Episode 4	
2022	Dreamy Chairs	Presenter				
2022	What's Happening?	Jenny		YouTube	Episode 1: "Activism"	
2023	Sound Boy	Actor				

== Audiography ==
=== Radio ===
Year	Title	Role	Other Role	Station	Notes	Ref
2013	Fresh From The Fringe - 2013	Guest		BBC Radio 4		
2014–2016	Newsjack	Various		BBC Radio 4	Series 10, Episode 4; Series 11, Episodes 3, 4, 5; Series 12, Episode 1; Series 13, Episode 3; Series 14, Episode 2; Series 15, Episode 2	
2015	Tim Key's Poetry Programme	Anne White		BBC Radio 4	Series 3, Episode 2: "Dating"	
2015, 2017	Sisters	Actor		BBC Radio 4	Series 1, 2	
2016	The King's Men	Mary / Vera		BBC Radio 2		
2019	Date Night	Rita		BBC Radio 4	Series 1	
2023	Screenshot: Double Acts	Self (archive material)		BBC Radio 4		
2025	Time of the Week	Ruth Paul		BBC Radio 4	Series 2, Episode 2	
2026	Crossing The Floor	Nellie		BBC Radio 4	Pilot	
	Vanity Fair	Becky Sharp		BBC Radio 4		
	Interrogation Room B			BBC Radio 4		
	Awesome Lives			BBC Radio 4		
