= Revunions =

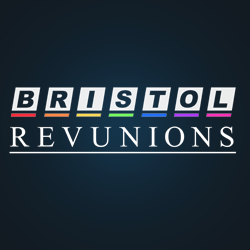
The Revunions logo, used on their Twitter feed and Facebook page.

Bristol Revunions, or more commonly Revunions or Revs, is a sketch comedy student society at the University of Bristol. Founded in the early 1950s, the group has produced many well-known alumni and continues to write and perform sketch material both within Bristol and at the Edinburgh Festival Fringe.

== History ==
The earliest reference to Revunions dates back to 2 July 1953, although it is likely that the society existed before this date, making it the oldest performing arts society within the University of Bristol. Originally a dramatic society that performed a comedy revue on an annual basis, Revunions moved closer to its present-day status as a sketch comedy society within its first thirty years of existence. This progress was abruptly halted in the mid-1980s when the group faced bankruptcy, following the speculative disappearance of its treasurer to Paraguay along with the society's funds. As a result, the society entered a hiatus that was not ended until 2008, when the group was resurrected. Since then, the group has taken a series of shows to the Edinburgh Festival Fringe and performs its material throughout the greater Bristol area, often performing with the sister society Bristol Improv.

=== Alumni ===
- David Bamber
- Robert Carsen
- Allan Corduner
- Sue Jones-Davies
- Jamie Demetriou
- Natasia Demetriou
- Greg Doran
- Mat Ewins
- Nicholas Farrell
- Linda Gillard
- Julia Hills
- Chris Langham
- Norman Lloyd-Edwards
- Charlotte Ritchie
- Alex Norris
- Colin Sell
- Alastair Stewart
- Ellie White
- Kathryn Wolfe

== Structure ==
Revunions is run by an annually-elected committee, led by a president. The president is assisted in their role by a vice-president, secretary and treasurer, fulfilling various roles that assist with the running and promotion of the society.

The group meets weekly to create new material, rehearse and perform sketches, and produce several sketch shows each year.

== See also ==
- Cambridge Footlights
- The Oxford Revue
