= Alistair Green =

British comedian

Alistair Green (27 May 1977) is a British comedian born in Romford, England known for his videos on Twitter, as well as appearances in several television programmes including regular or one off roles in Flowers, The Great, Mandy, Stath Lets Flats, The Witchfinder, Ellie & Natasia, GameFace and How Are You? It's Alan (Partridge).

Green was educated at Royal Liberty School in Romford, after which he worked a range of jobs, including as a trainee money broker and Pizza Hut delivery driver in his late teenage years. He later studied art history at university.

In 2022 he appeared as Owen in series 4 of Ghosts on BBC One. In 2023 he made a guest appearance on the TV show Dreamland.
