= A Whole Lifetime with Jamie Demetriou =

2023 British comedy special

- Genre: Comedy; Sketch show Surreal humour
- Created by: Jamie Demetriou
- Written by: Jamie Demetriou
- Directed by: Andrew Gaynord
- Starring: Jamie Demetriou; Ellie White; Emma Sidi; Katy Wix; Kiell Smith-Bynoe; Sian Clifford; Bella Glanville; Christopher Jeffers; Mark Silcox; Jonny Sweet; Jon Pointing; Phoebe Walsh; Will Hislop; Al Roberts; Raphale Sowole; Seb Cardinal; Lloyd Griffith; Matthew Colthart; Nathan Geal; Freddie Meredith
- Music by: Jamie Demetriou; Joe Pelling
- Country of origin: United Kingdom
- Original language: English

Production
- Executive producers: Simon Bird; Josh Cole; Jamie Demetriou; Andrew Gaynord; Jonny Sweet
- Producer: Olly Cambridge
- Editor: Saam Hodivala
- Production companies: BBC Studios Productions; Guilty Party Pictures

Original release
- Network: Netflix
- Release: 28 February 2023

A Whole Lifetime with Jamie Demetriou is a 2023 British comedy special from Jamie Demetriou that was broadcast on Netflix in the United Kingdom from 28 February 2023. A one-hour special, it shows a series of sketches depicting life from cradle to grave, featuring guest appearances and songs.

== Synopsis ==
The hour-long comedy sketch special shows a series of comedy sketches taking the audience from the womb, through childhood, adulthood and beyond, accompanied by song.

== Production ==
Demetriou said he was approached by Netflix to pitch sketch comedy ideas. Initially, he said he planned "a more sprawling sketch show and then we figured that an hour is a testing amount of time for something that isn't narrative." Demetriou described the show as "birth to death in songs and sketches." The show was commissioned prior to the COVID-19 pandemic and had a delayed production until after the outbreak. The project was produced by BBC Studios Productions and Guilty Party Pictures with Demetriou writing and starring.

== Cast ==
- Jamie Demetriou
- Ellie White
- Emma Sidi
- Katy Wix
- Kiell Smith-Bynoe
- Sian Clifford
- Bella Glanville
- Christopher Jeffers
- Mark Silcox
- Jonny Sweet
- Jon Pointing
- Phoebe Walsh
- Will Hislop
- Al Roberts
- Raphale Sowole
- Seb Cardinal
- Lloyd Griffith
- Matthew Colthart
- Nathan Geal
- Freddie Meredith

== Broadcast ==
The show was available on Netflix from 28 February 2023 in the United Kingdom.

== Reception ==
=== Critical reception ===
Stuart Heritage in The Guardian said he "laughed harder and for longer than I can remember". Isobel Lewis in The Independent said the comedy was "decidedly British but with a Netflix sheen...silly, but lacking the sharpness of Stath or his live sketch characters. It's that attempt to straddle both worlds that leaves Demetriou's comedy feeling surprisingly watered down." Chris Bennion in The Daily Telegraph called it "a wild, ribald sketch comedy special that... shows, in flashes, its creator's sublime genius, offering moments of sheer joy, punctuated by longer, more baffling sections that ultimately disappoint."

=== Accolades ===
The show international Rose d'Or Award for Comedy Entertainment in November 2023. In February 2024, it was nominated in the Best TV Show category at the Chortle Awards. In March 2024, Demitriou was nominated in the Male performance in a comedy programme category at the 2024 British Academy Television Awards.
