= Jamie Demetriou =

English comedian, writer and actor

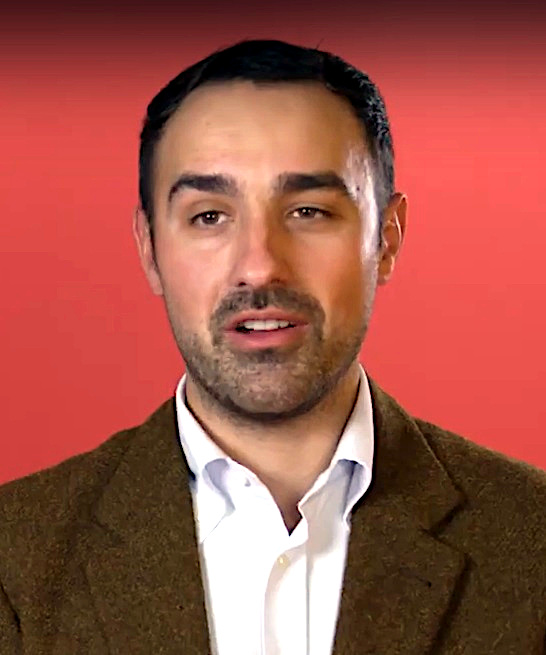
- Demetriou in 2021
- Born: 1 November 1987 (age 39); London, England
- Education: University of Bristol (BA)
- Occupations: Comedian; actor; screenwriter
- Years active: 2008–present
- Notable work: Stath Lets Flats
- Relatives: Natasia Demetriou (sister)

Jamie Demetriou (/dɪˈmiːtriuː/; born 1 November 1987) is an English comedian, actor and screenwriter. He is known for his role as Bus Rodent in Fleabag and for creating, co-writing, and starring in Stath Lets Flats. For the latter, he won Best Male Actor in a Comedy, Best Writer of a Comedy, and Best Scripted Comedy at the 2020 BAFTA Awards.

== Early life and education ==
Demetriou was born in the Friern Barnet area of London the son of an English mother and Greek-Cypriot father. His elder sister, Natasia Demetriou, is a comedian and actress with whom he often collaborates.

Demetriou attended The Compton School in North Finchley and joined the Chickenshed Theatre in Southgate.

After school, Demetriou attended Bristol University. His student revue show Bristol Revunions received critical acclaim at the Edinburgh Fringe Festival from 2009 to 2011.

== Career ==
=== Early career ===
In 2013, Demetriou's one-man multi-character show People Day drew a comparison with Steve Coogan in The Independent.

In 2015, Demetriou participated in the Comedy Feed sketch show pilot, People Time, for BBC Three alongside his sisters Natasia Demetriou, Daran Johnson and Al Roberts, Liam Williams, Claudia O'Doherty and Ellie White. The Guardian said that "someone needs to invest big in People Time because it should be on television and soon". Comedian Adam Buxton said that it was the "best comedy thing I’ve seen in a long while". Despite its good reviews, it did not get commissioned. Continuing with the cast (minus O'Doherty), he co-created the web series 2016: Year Friends. Each episode was written by a different member of the troupe. The premise of the series is that a group of friends get together and make some new year's resolutions. The show is influenced by British mockumentaries including The Office and That Peter Kay Thing, as well as the nascent reality TV genre.

=== 2018–2021: Stath Lets Flats ===
Demetriou wrote (with the first three episodes co-written by Robert Popper) and starred as Stath in the Channel 4 sitcom Stath Lets Flats which ran from 2018 to 2021. It also stars Natasia Demetriou, Al Roberts, Ellie White, Katy Wix and Dustin Demri-Burns.

In 2019, Demetriou was nominated for two BAFTA Awards for the series – Best Male Performance in a Comedy Programme and Best Scripted Comedy (as producer). In 2020, he won three BAFTAs for the show for Best Writer: Comedy, Male Performance in a Comedy Programme, and Best Scripted Comedy (as producer).

=== 2019: This Time with Alan Partridge, Ellie & Natasia ===
In 2019, Demetriou appeared as celebrity chef Ralphy Moore in an episode of This Time with Alan Partridge, causing Alan to have a major allergic reaction by accidentally serving him oysters. He also provided the voice of a phone-in caller in another episode.

Also in 2019, Demetriou appeared in various roles in sister Natasia's comedy sketch show pilot Ellie & Natasia.

Demetriou played Marcus in the American miniseries Four Weddings and a Funeral, an adaptation of the 1994 British film of the same name.

=== 2023: A Whole Lifetime with Jamie Demetriou ===
In 2023 he created the sketch comedy programme A Whole Lifetime with Jamie Demetriou for Netflix.

In February 2024, the show was nominated in the Best TV Show category at the Chortle Awards. In March 2024, Demetriou was nominated in the Male performance in a comedy programme category at the 2024 British Academy Television Awards.

In 2026, Demetriou joined Saturday Night Live UK as a consultant and helped with cast selection. He hosted the show in the second episode of season 2.

== Personal life ==
Demetriou has a daughter (born 2026) with Clare Cole, daughter of British actor Steve Coogan.

Demetriou is a fan of Tottenham Hotspur Football Club, where he holds a season ticket.

== Filmography ==
=== Television ===
Year	Title	Role	Notes	Ref
2013	Anna & Katy	Warren	Also writer (3 episodes)	
2013	Jamie Demetriou: Channel 4 Comedy Blaps	Various	Also writer	
2013–2015	BBC Comedy Feeds	Various		
2014	The Midnight Beast	Terror Moses	Episode: "Going Solo"; also writer	
2014	Uncle	Fresh	Episode: "Nephew"	
2014	Rev.	Interviewer		
2014	Morning Has Broken	Max	TV pilot	
2014	Badults	Squinky / Eskimo	Episode: "Holiday"	
2014	Friday Night Dinner	Bowling Manager	Episode: "Mr Morris Returns"	
2014	The Mimic	Clown		
2014	Siblings	Obnoxious Guy	Episode: "Vet Drugs"	
2014	Toast of London	Troy	Episode: "Fool in Love"	
2014–2016	Lovesick	Samuels	2 episodes	
2015–2016	Drunk History: UK	Queen's Courtier / Conspiring Journalist	2 episodes	
2015	Cockroaches	Randall	4 episodes	
2015	SunTrap	Zorro	Main cast	
2015	Tripped	Paul	Main cast	
2016	The Increasingly Poor Decisions of Todd Margaret	Demolition Expert	Episode: "The Poor Decisions of Todd Margaret Part 2"	
2016	@elevenish	Matt Tansey		
2016	Hoff the Record	Mikey Dawson	Episode: "Divorce"	
2016	Love, Nina	Robber		
2016	Rovers	Tom		
2016	Wasted	Alistair	Episode: "The Other Pub"	
2016	Borderline	DJ Stefano Rocco	Episode: "Profiling"	
2016	Fleabag	Bus Rodent	2 episodes	
2016	Morgana Robinson's The Agency	Carl / Tesco delivery guy	2 episodes	
2016	Halloween Comedy Shorts: Jamie Demetriou's Horror: Oh God	Mark / Phil	Also writer	
2016	2016: Year Friends	Jamie	All 12 episodes; also writer and director	
2016–2017	Tracey Ullman's Show	Various	7 episodes	
2017	Pls Like	Bombzy	Episode: "Music"	
2018	The Big Narstie Show	Himself	Season 1, episode 4	
2018	Sally4Ever	Steven	Season 1, episode 1	
2018–2021	Stath Lets Flats	Stath Charalambos	Also creator, writer, producer	
2019	Four Weddings and a Funeral	Marcus	Recurring role	
2019	Ellie & Natasia	Various		
2019	Harry Hill's Clubnite	Andy		
2020	Miracle Workers	Town Crier	6 episodes	
2020	The Great	Doctor Chekhov	4 episodes	
2022–2023	The Afterparty	Walt	Main cast (season 1); Guest role (season 2)	
2022	Red Flag	Various	Channel 4 Blap	
2022	Dead End: Paranormal Park	Fingers (voice)	9 episodes	
2023	A Whole Lifetime with Jamie Demetriou	Various	Comedy special	
2025	Funboys	David	Episode 4: "Friends Forever"	
2025	The Simpsons	Aeropos Walkov (voice)	Episode "Abe League of Their Moe"	
2025	Bob's Burgers	Gabriel (voice)	Episode: "The Twinnening"	
2026	Saturday Night Live UK	Himself (host)	Episode: "Jamie Demetriou/Royal Blood"	
2026	Pride and Prejudice	Mr. Collins		

=== Film ===
Year	Title	Role	Notes	Ref
2015	Bill	Sergio		
2016	The Darkest Universe	Jack		
2017	Paddington 2	The Professor		
2018	Sherlock Gnomes	Moriarty (voice)		
2018	Game Over, Man!	Mr. Ahmad		
2019	Horrible Histories: The Movie – Rotten Romans	Dimidius		
2020	Eurovision Song Contest: The Story of Fire Saga	Kevin Swain		
2021	Cruella	Gerald		
2021	The Electrical Life of Louis Wain	Richard Caton Woodville Jr.		
2022	Pinocchio	Headmaster		
2022	Catherine Called Birdy	Etienne		
2022	Night at the Museum: Kahmunrah Rises Again	Dr. McPhee (voice)		
2023	Barbie	Mattel employee		
2023	Strays	Chester (voice)		
2025	Back in Action	Nigel		
2025	The Roses	Rory		
2025	Jay Kelly	Clive		
2026	The Moment	Tim		
2027	Not Alone	Sherm (voice)	In production	
2027	Gatto	Plague Doctor (voice)	Post-production	
2027	Naughty		Filming	

=== Music videos ===
Year	Title	Artists	Ref
2018	"nightmares"	hard life	

== Audiography ==
=== Radio ===
Year	Title	Channel	Notes	Ref
2012	Fresh From the Fringe	BBC Radio 4		

=== Podcast appearances ===
Demetriou has appeared on several podcasts including: Scroobius Pip's Distraction Pieces Podcast; the Brian Gittins; Friends podcast; Off Menu with Ed Gamble and James Acaster; and Richard Herring's RHLSTP.
