= Kiell Smith-Bynoe =

British actor (born 1989)

- Smith-Bynoe in 2026
- Born: 5 March 1989 (age 37); London, England
- Occupation: Actor
- Years active: 2010–present

Kiell Troy Smith-Bynoe (/kaɪˌɛl smɪθ ˈbaɪnoʊ/ ky-EL smith BY-noh: born 5 March 1989) is a British actor, comedian and presenter. He is best-known for his acting roles including Ghosts, Stath Lets Flats, Man Like Mobeen, Enterprice and Mitchell And Webb Are Not Helping. He has also appeared on various television panel shows including Taskmaster and Would I Lie to You?.

== Early life ==
Kiell was born in the London Borough of Newham on 5 March 1989 and grew up in East Ham. His mother Jen worked for the NHS in the London Ambulance Service. His father Fitzburn was a semi-professional cricketer and died in 2018. Kiell has 11 confirmed paternal half siblings but his sister speculated he could have up to 16.

Smith-Bynoe attended St Bonaventure's, an all-boys secondary school in Forest Gate. He trained in the Joan Littlewood improvisation style as part of the junior group at Theatre Royal Stratford East and similarly as an adult at the East 15 Acting School. He is still part of improv comedy troupes such as BattleActs with whom he has performed at festivals including the Edinburgh Festival.

== Career ==
One of Smith-Bynoe's early acting roles was in 2012 in the YouTube web series Diary of a Bad Man as a gangster called Klayze, and his first professional role was in the 2012 crime drama series Whitechapel. He was previously known for the novelty grime hit "Junior Spesh" under the name MC Klayze Flaymz.

In 2021, Smith-Bynoe appeared in the first series of the radio comedy series Michael Spicer: Before Next Door, playing various characters, including the titular character’s boss.

From 2019 to 2023, he appeared in BBC's hit sitcom Ghosts as Mike Cooper. In 2026, he returned for the Ghosts feature film, Ghosts: The Possession of Button House.

He appeared on the 2021 BBC Christmas special of The Great British Sewing Bee.

In April 2022, Smith-Bynoe popularised the term "Platty Joobs" as a nickname for the Platinum Jubilee of Elizabeth II, having been the first to use the phrase on Twitter.

On 6 May 2022, his Channel 4 Comedy Blap (short form presentation) Red Flag was released.

He was a contestant in Series 15 of Taskmaster broadcast in 2023, finishing as runner-up. He returned for the "Champion of Champions" special in 2024, filling in for Series 15 winner Mae Martin, who had a scheduling conflict.

In October 2023, it was announced that he would host the 2023 Christmas special edition of The Great British Sewing Bee and that he would also host the programme's tenth series in 2024.

In September and October 2024, Smith-Bynoe was a guest panellist in two episodes of series 93 of the BBC Radio 4 comedy game show Just a Minute.

Throughout 2026 Smith-Bynoe is on tour across the UK with his improv comedy show Kool Story Bro, which he has regularly produced between other projects since its debut at the Edinburgh Fringe in August 2023.

== Personal life ==
Kiell lives in London with his girlfriend.

== Filmography ==
=== Film ===
Key
†	Denotes films that have not yet been released

Year	Title	Role	Notes
2013	Frayed	Simeon	Short films
2014	That Moment	Rochelle	Short films
2016	The Tinder Problem	Tobi	Short films
2016	Gangsters Gamblers Geezers	Extra	Feature film
2017	Get Staffed	Tailor	Short films
2017	Jermaine and Elsie	Giles	Short films
2019	Insecurity Questions	Spencer	Short films
2020	Mondeo	Kevin	Short films
2020	The Wedding Dance	Josh	Short films
2020	Greasy Spoon	Kyle	Short films
2020	Winner	Winner	Short films
2023	Knock Knock (Knock)	The Door (voice)	Short films
2024	Time Travel Is Dangerous	Young Ralph	Feature film
2025	Attack of the Coat	Dr. Mac	Short film
2026	Wicker	Innkeeper	Feature film
2026	Ghosts: The Possession of Button House	Mike Cooper	Feature film
2026	Merry Christmas Aubrey Flint	Kugan	Feature film

=== Television ===
Key
†	Denotes television productions that have not yet been released

Year	Title	Role	Notes
2007	Dubplate Drama	Road Idol Hopeful	Uncredited role
2010	Diary of a Bad Man	Klayze	YouTube miniseries. Season 1 (1 episode)
2012	Whitechapel	Tony Huddart	Series 3; Episode 6
2013	Unfamous	Shaquille	Series 1
2014	Comedy Feeds	Monique / Dennis	Series 3; Episode 3: "Parents Evening"
2015	Venus vs. Mars	Shy	Episode 6: "Social Network"
2016	The T-Boy Show	Lucas	Series 2; Episode 9: "Basketball"
2016	#HoodDocumentary	Benjamin	Episodes 5 & 6: "Launch Party – Parts 1 & 2"
2016	Dropperz	Judas J – Band member	Episode: "Bunny's Bitten It"
2017	Britain Today Tonight	Ceviche Patron	Episodes 2, 4 & 5
2017	Cheap Cheap Cheap	Keith	30 episodes
2018	Enterprice	Guy	Series 1; Episodes 1–4
2018	Friday Night Dinner	Nick	Series 5; Episode 2: "The Tin of Meat"
2018	On the Edge	Yaz	Miniseries; Series 1; Episode 3: "That Girl" (as Kiell Troy Smith-Bynoe)
2018	SO Beano!	Trent	Episode 24: "Invisible Girlfriend". Also writer
2018	Laur and Disorder	Danny	Miniseries
2018	That Girl	Yaz	Television film
2018–2021	Stath Lets Flats	Dean	Series 1–3 (17 episodes)
2019	Degree	Guest Star (voice)	Miniseries; Episode 6: "Don't Care Home"
2019	Ladhood	Phil	Series 1; Episode 1: "The Fight"
2019, 2022	Ellie & Natasia	Carl	Pilot episode (2019) and Series 1; Episode 3 (2022)
2019–2023	Ghosts	Mike Cooper	Main role. Series 1–5 (34 episodes)
2020	Man Like Mobeen	Jovell Maynard	Series 3; Episodes 3–5
2020	Enterprice	Produ	Series 2; Episode 2: "Crazy South"
2020	Comedians in Quarantine	Robin	Episode: "The Lockdown League". Also writer
2020	Hilda	(Additional voices)	Series 2; Episodes 1–13
2021	Death in Paradise	Tarone Vincent	Series 10; Episode 8: "I'll Never Let You Go"
2021	Ant & Dec's Saturday Night Takeaway	Police Officer	Series 17; Episode 2
2021	Bloods	Kevin	Series 1; Episode 1: "Partners"
2021	Murder, They Hope	Detective Marcus	Series 1; Episode 3: "Dales of the Unexpected"
2021	Back Chat	Steve (voice)	Episode 3: "Sex and Transport"
2021	Double Trouble	Police Officer	Television film. Uncredited role
2021	The Great British Sewing Bee	Himself – Contestant	Series 7; Episode 11: "Celebrity Christmas Special"
2021	Hilda and the Mountain King	(Additional voices)	Television film
2021–2022	Horrible Histories	Various	Series 9 (4 episodes)
2022	Lazy Susan	Jon	Episode 1
2022	Mood	Alfred	Miniseries; Episode 3: "Hannibal"
2022	The Witchfinder	Mr. Griffin	Episode 1
2022	Don't Hug Me I'm Scared	Saturdavid (voice)	Episode 4: "Friendship"
2022	The Train	Jason	Miniseries; Episode 1: "Spring"
2022	The Lovebox in Your Living Room	Ford Factory Worker	Television film
2022	Celebrity Catchphrase	Himself – Contestant	Series 7; Episode 5: "Katie Piper, Kiell Smith-Bynoe and Shaun Williamson"
2022	It's What She Would Have Wanted	Dave the Boss	Television film
2022	Would I Lie to You?	Himself – Panellist	Series 15; Episode 5
2022	Live at the Moth Club	Denzel	Episodes 1–5
2022	Red Flag	Various	Channel 4 Blap. Miniseries. Also creator/writer/producer
2022	Sky Comedy Shorts	Marcus	Miniseries; Episode 4: "Silo". Also writer
2023	Richard Osman's House of Games	Himself – Contestant	5 episodes
2023	A Whole Lifetime with Jamie Demetriou	Saul	Television Special on Netflix
2023	The Weakest Link	Himself – Contestant	Series 2; Episode 12
2023	Dreamland	Spence	Episodes 1–6
2023	The Curse	Peter Nelson	Series 2; Episodes 2–4
2023–2024	Taskmaster	Himself – Contestant	Series 15; Episodes 1–10, and Champion of Champions III special
2023–2024	Richard Osman's House of Games	Himself – Contestant	Series 7; Week 1, and Champions Week 1 (10 episodes)
2024	The Traitors: The Movie	Miles Asteri	Television film (Segment in Comic Relief: Funny for Money)
2024	The Great British Sewing Bee	Himself – Host	Series 10
2024	Peacock	Dr. Walcott	Series 2; Episode 5
2025	Mitchell And Webb Are Not Helping	Various	Series 1 regular
2025	Death Valley	Aaron James	Series 1; Episode 3
2025	The Horne Section TV Show	Victor Flamencito	Series 2: Episode 3 "The Cancellation"
2026	House of Games	Himself – Contestant	Series 10: Week 1 (5 episodes)
2026	The Reluctant Vampire †	Kenny the Grocer	Series 1; Episode 2
TBA	Badjelly †	Dad (Leo)	Post-production
