= Natasia Demetriou =

British actress and comedian

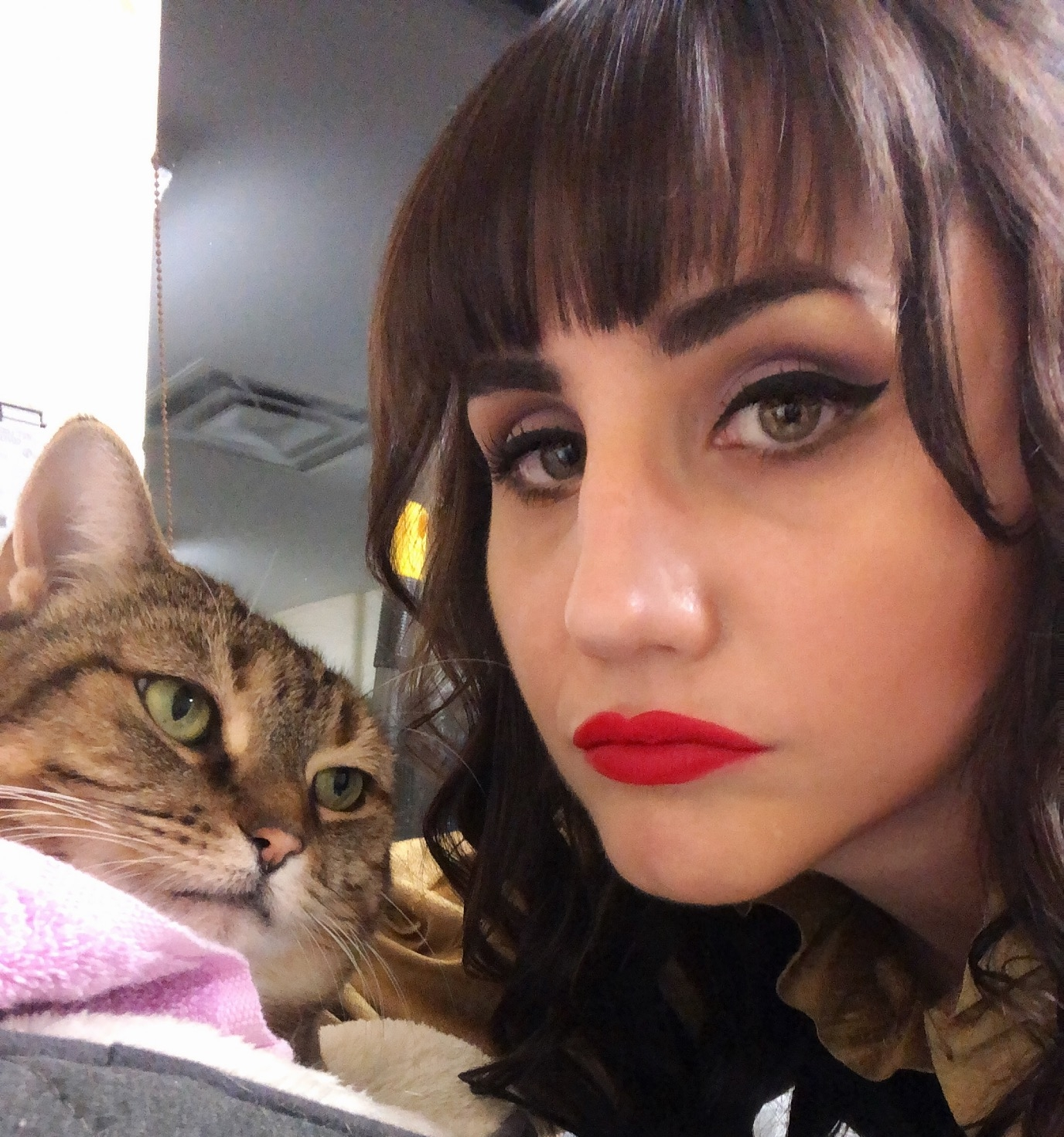
- Demetriou in 2018
- Born: Natasia Charlotte Demetriou; London, England
- Education: University of Leeds
- Occupations: Comedian; actress; screenwriter
- Years active: 2012–present
- Known for: What We Do in the Shadows; Stath Lets Flats; Ellie & Natasia
- Children: 2
- Relatives: Jamie Demetriou (brother)

Natasia Charlotte Demetriou (born 15 January 1984) is a British actress, comedian and screenwriter. She is best known for her roles as Nadja in the FX comedy horror series What We Do in the Shadows (2019–2024) and Sophie in the Channel 4 sitcom Stath Lets Flats (2018–2021).

In 2022, Demetriou co-wrote and starred in the BBC sketch show Ellie & Natasia, alongside her comedy partner Ellie White. The show was renewed for a second series in 2023.

== Early life ==
Demetriou was born in London, the daughter of an English mother and Greek-Cypriot father. She was raised in North London. Her younger brother, Jamie Demetriou, is a comedian and actor with whom she often collaborates.

Demetriou studied acting at the University of Leeds. Prior to becoming a comedian, Demetriou worked as a makeup artist, notably working on music videos for Boy Better Know.

== Career ==
=== Early career ===
In 2014, Demetriou's debut show, You'll Never Have All of Me, won the Skinny Debutant Award at the Edinburgh Festival Fringe. She was also a longtime member of sketch comedy troupe Oyster Eyes and has written for Anna & Katy and The Midnight Beast.

Demetriou made her TV debut in 2013.

In 2015, Demetriou participated in the Comedy Feed sketch show pilot, People Time on BBC Three alongside her brother Jamie Demetriou, Daran Johnson, Al Roberts, Liam Williams, Claudia O'Doherty and Ellie White. The Guardian said that "someone needs to invest big in People Time because it should be on television and soon". Comedian Adam Buxton said that it was the "best comedy thing I've seen in a long while". Despite its good reviews, it did not get commissioned. Continuing with the cast (minus O'Doherty), he co-created the web series 2016: Year Friends. Each episode was written by a different member of the troupe. The premise of the series is that a group of friends get together and make some new year's resolutions. The show is influenced by British mockumentaries including The Office and That Peter Kay Thing, as well as the nascent reality TV genre.

=== 2018–2021: Stath Lets Flats ===
From 2018 to 2021, she played sister to her real life brother Jamie Demetriou's Stath in Channel 4 sitcom, Stath Lets Flats, about a family-run estate agent, which was written and created by her brother. On 11 May 2020, a special "lockdown" mini-episode was released online due to the COVID-19 pandemic. At the 2020 BAFTA awards, Stath Lets Flats won three awards: Best Male Actor in a comedy, Best Writer of a Comedy, and Best Scripted Comedy.

=== 2019–2022: Ellie & Natasia ===
In 2019, Demetriou wrote and starred in the BBC Three comedy sketch pilot Ellie & Natasia, a show inspired by social anxiety and being a woman in today's society, with long-time collaborator Ellie White. The Guardian described the show as "a fiercely funny sketch show you'll watch over and over" with "a strong seam of feminist fury running through".

In March 2020, it was reported that BBC commissioned a six-episode series, but it was delayed due to the COVID-19 pandemic. The series was finally released in 2022 for BBC Three. The Guardian gave the show a positive review, describing it as "silly" and "concise" and "makes a strong case that there is plenty of life in the British sketch show yet".

=== 2019–2024: What We Do in the Shadows ===
From 2019 to 2024, Demetriou played Nadja, a Greek Romani vampire, in the FX horror comedy series What We Do in the Shadows. The series was created by Jemaine Clement and Taika Waititi, based upon their 2014 film of the same name. The mockumentary follows three vampires (Laszlo, Nadja, and Nandor) living in a house in Staten Island and trying to cope with modern-day New York City, along with an energy vampire (Colin) and Nandor's human familiar (Guillermo). The show co-stars Kayvan Novak, Matt Berry, Harvey Guillén and Mark Proksch.

=== 2020–Present: Other projects ===
Starting 18 May 2020, Demetriou and Vic Reeves co-hosted Netflix's unscripted reality competition show The Big Flower Fight. The eight-part series sees 10 pairs of contestants in a knockout competition featuring huge flower installations with the winner going on to design an installation to be displayed in London's Royal Botanic Gardens, Kew.

In 2021, Demetriou was a series regular on the second series of This Time with Alan Partridge, portraying a flirtatious makeup artist named Tiff.

== Personal life ==
Demetriou lives in North London. She has two children, one born in 2024 and one born in 2026.

== Filmography ==
=== Film ===
Year	Title	Role	Notes	Ref.
2014	Swag	Office Worker	Short film	
2014	Intervention	Nicole	Short film	
2018	The Festival	Bride Smurf		
2018	Man of the Hour	Christina	Short film	
2020	Eurovision Song Contest: The Story of Fire Saga	Nina		
2023	The Magician's Elephant	Narrator / The Fortune Teller (voice)		
2023	Teenage Mutant Ninja Turtles: Mutant Mayhem	Wingnut (voice)		
2024	Orion and the Dark	Sleep (voice)		
2027	Gatto	Charon (Voice)	Post-production	
TBA	Close Personal Friends †	TBA	Post-production	

=== Television ===
Year	Title	Role	Notes	Ref.
2012	Dr. Brown	Various	Sketch series	
2014	Live at the Electric	Linda	3 episodes	
2014	Badults	Clock / Eskimo	Episode: "Holiday"	
2014–2015	BBC Comedy Feeds	Various	2 episodes; also writer	
2015	Funeral	Mourner	Television special	
2015	Top Coppers	Gail	2 episodes	
2015	Lolly Adefope's Christmas	Mara	Television film	
2016	@elevenish	Various	11 episodes; also writer	
2016	Harry Hill's Tea Time	Greek Orthodox Priest	Episode: "Paul Hollywood"	
2016	Morgana Robinson's The Agency	Receptionist	2 episodes	
2016	Halloween Comedy Shorts	Lucy	Episode: "Oh God"	
2016	2016: Year Friends	Tash	12 episodes; also writer	
2016–2019	8 Out of 10 Cats Does Countdown	Herself	2 episodes	
2017	Liam Williams' Valentine	Nancy	Television film	
2017	Comedy Playhouse	Jen	Episode: "Static"	
2017–2018	Sick Note	Officer Chadwick	2 episodes	
2018	Pls Like	Tingle Maid	3 episodes	
2018	Comedy Blaps	Brenda	Episode: "Furious Andrew"	
2018	Dara O Briain's Go 8 Bit	Herself	Episode: "#3.8"	
2018–2021	Stath Lets Flats	Sophie	18 episodes	
2019	The Road to Brexit	Jemima Codex-Forrester	Television film	
2019	Urban Myths	Agnieszka	Episode: "Andy & The Donald"	
2019	CelebAbility	Herself	Episode: "#3.3"	
2019–2020	8 Out of 10 Cats	Herself	2 episodes	
2019–2024	What We Do in the Shadows	Nadja / Nadja Doll	Main cast; 61 episodes	
2020	The Big Flower Fight	Herself / Host	8 episodes	
2021	This Time with Alan Partridge	Tiff	5 episodes	
2022	Toast of Tinseltown	Carmen	Episode: “Doctor Grainger”	
2022	The Cuphead Show!	Cala Maria (voice)	Episodes: "#2.3", "#2.6"	
2022–2026	Ellie & Natasia	Multiple characters	9 episodes	
2024	Kite Man: Hell Yeah!	Malice Vundabar (voice)	8 episodes	
2024	Rob Beckett's Smart TV	Herself	4 episodes	
2024–2025	Tales of the Teenage Mutant Ninja Turtles	Wingnut (voice)	7 episodes	
2025	The Completely Made-Up Adventures of Dick Turpin	Helga	Episode: "The Night of the Werebear"	
2026	Last One Laughing UK		Series 2, Episode 5	

=== Video games ===
Year	Title	Role	Notes	Ref.
2027	Fable	Jenny (voice)		

=== Theatre ===
Year	Title	Role	Venue	Notes	Ref.
2018	Natasia Demetriou and Ellie White are Gettin’ Big	Herself	Soho Theatre	Also writer	

== Awards and nominations ==
Year	Association	Category	Title	Result	Ref.
2014	The Skinny	Debutant Award	You'll Never Have All of Me	Won	
2021	Critics' Choice Super Awards	Best Actress in a Science Fiction/Fantasy Series	What We Do in the Shadows	Won	
2021	Critics' Choice Television Awards	Best Actress in a Comedy Series	What We Do in the Shadows	Nominated	
2021	Saturn Awards	Best Supporting Actress on Television	What We Do in the Shadows	Nominated	
2022	British Academy Television Awards	Best Female Comedy Performance	Stath Lets Flats	Nominated	
2023	British Academy Television Awards	Best Female Comedy Performance	Ellie and Natasia	Nominated	
2023	Critics' Choice Super Awards	Best Actress in a Horror Series	What We Do in the Shadows	Nominated	
