= Ellie & Natasia =

2022 British television series

- Genre: Sketch comedy
- Created by: Ellie White; Natasia Demetriou
- Written by: Ellie White; Natasia Demetriou
- Directed by: Simon Bird; Paul Taylor
- Starring: Ellie White; Natasia Demetriou
- Country of origin: United Kingdom
- Original language: English
- No. of series: 2
- No. of episodes: 9

Production
- Executive producers: Mobashir Dar; Harry Hill; Danielle Lux
- Producer: Olly Cambridge
- Running time: 15 minutes (series 1); 30 minutes (series 2)
- Production companies: CPL Productions; Nit Television

Original release
- Network: BBC Three (series 1); BBC Two (series 2)
- Release: 21 June 2022 – present

Ellie & Natasia is a sketch comedy television series created by and starring Ellie White and Natasia Demetriou. The first series began on BBC Three in June 2022. A second series started on BBC Two on 21 October 2026

The first series won Best TV Sketch Show at the Comedy.co.uk Awards 2022. The Guardian described it as "outrageously good" in an in-depth review. The Independent reviewer opined that it "marks the revival of the sketch show" and "the arrival in earnest of a formidable new double act".

The creators drew on French and Saunders and Smack the Pony as inspirations.

== Cast ==
Main

- Ellie White
- Natasia Demetriou

Supporting

- Alexander Owen
- Alistair Green
- Alistair Roberts
- Asim Chaudhry
- Arnab Chanda
- Barney White
- Bec Boey
- Ben Ashenden
- Charles Jimenez
- Daniel Barker
- David Morrissey
- David Mumeni
- Dustin Demri-Burns
- Elena Valdameri
- Hannah Henderson
- Harry Hill
- Harry Trevaldwyn
- Hugh Skinner
- Isabelle Bernardo
- Jamie Demetriou
- Juliette Motamed
- Katy Wix
- Kiell Smith-Bynoe
- Matt Berry
- Nicholas Tredrea
- Nicole Joseph
- Oliver Proudlock-John
- Phill Dunning
- Rory Marshall
- Rosa Robson
- Seb Cardinal
- Shivani Thussu
- Sian Clifford
- Simon Bird
- Steve Coogan
- Vivienne Acheampong
