= Live from the BBC =

British stand-up comedy television series

- Title card
- Genre: Stand-up comedy
- Directed by: Geraldine Dowd
- Composer: Toby Knowles
- Country of origin: United Kingdom
- Original language: English
- No. of series: 3
- No. of episodes: 18

Production
- Executive producers: Jonathan Blyth; Tilusha Ghelani; Lucy Ansbro
- Producer: Lindsay Jex
- Running time: 28 minutes (43 minutes extended version)
- Production company: Phil McIntyre Television

Original release
- Network: BBC Three
- Release: 17 February 2016 – present

Live from the BBC is a British stand-up comedy series that has aired on the online BBC Three service since 17 February 2016. Three series have aired, both with six episodes. Series one has two comedians per episode (three in episode 5) and series two and three have one comedian per episode. The series is filmed at the BBC Radio Theatre at the Broadcasting House in London.

== Episodes ==
=== Series 1 (2016) ===
| Episode | Comedians | Airdate |
|---|---|---|
| 1 | Mae Martin; Nish Kumar | 17 February 2016 |
| 2 | Alex Edelman; Tez Ilyas | 24 February 2016 |
| 3 | Spencer Jones; James Acaster | 2 March 2016 |
| 4 | Larry Dean; Felicity Ward | 9 March 2016 |
| 5 | Kerry & Kurtan; Sofie Hagen | 16 March 2016 |
| 6 | Adam Hess; Dane Baptiste | 23 March 2016 |

=== Series 2 (2017) ===
| Episode | Comedian | Airdate |
|---|---|---|
| 1 | Sara Pascoe; Jonny Pelham (in extended version) | 15 June 2017 |
| 2 | Doc Brown; Lou Sanders (in extended version) | 22 June 2017 |
| 3 | John Robins; Tom Ward (in extended version) | 29 June 2017 |
| 4 | Josie Long; Guz Khan (in extended version) | 29 June 2017 |
| 5 | Ivo Graham; Luisa Omielan (in extended version) | 6 July 2017 |
| 6 | Liam Williams; Sindhu Vee (in extended version) | 13 July 2017 |

=== Series 3 (2018) ===
| Episode | Comedian | Airdate |
|---|---|---|
| 1 | Fern Brady | 27 June 2018 |
| 2 | Rhys Nicholson | 4 July 2018 |
| 3 | Suzi Ruffell | 11 July 2018 |
| 4 | Chris Washington | 18 July 2018 |
| 5 | Desiree Burch | 25 July 2018 |
| 6 | Mat Ewins | 1 August 2018 |
