= Anna & Katy =

British comedy sketch TV show

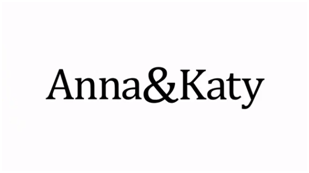
- Title card
- Genre: Sketch comedy Satire
- Created by: Anna Crilly; Katy Wix
- Written by: Anna Crilly; Katy Wix; Paul Doolan; Jamie Demetriou; Joe Wilkinson; Laurence Rickard; Fergus Craig; Chris Grady; David McNeill; Natasia Demetriou; Dale Shaw; William Andrews; Tom Golding; Holly Walsh; Phoebe Walsh; Steve Morrison
- Directed by: Ed Bye
- Starring: Anna Crilly; Katy Wix; With an ensemble of William Andrews; Laurence Rickard; Tom Bell; Fergus Craig; Sophie Black; Alex Lowe; Jamie Demetriou; Jonny Sweet; Joe Wilkinson
- Opening theme: "I Love You Ono" by Stereo Total
- Composer: Robert Wix
- Country of origin: United Kingdom
- Original language: English
- No. of series: 1
- No. of episodes: 7 (pilot + 1 series)

Production
- Executive producer: Ash Atalla
- Producer: Jon Petrie
- Editor: Adam Windmill
- Running time: 23 minutes

Original release
- Network: Channel 4
- Release: 2 September 2011 – 10 April 2013

Anna & Katy is a British comedy sketch show, beginning on Channel 4 on 6 March 2013 following a pilot edition as part of the Comedy Lab series in 2011. It featured regular comedy partners Anna Crilly and Katy Wix, with regular guests including Lee Mack, whose sitcom Not Going Out Wix also starred in at the time. It shows their comic characters and also satire/parody/pastiche/burlesque of well-known TV formats, with celebrity cameos.

== Regular sketches ==
- Congratulation! – A spoof television show in which two cheerful presenters read out congratulatory messages to viewers for mundane events, including buying a new jacket or receiving a new passport. Although the presenters (played by Crilly and Wix) are both white, they, and any guests on the show, speak in broad Jamaican accents. The show ends with one viewer receiving "the biggest congratulation of them all", which involves the presenters flashing their vaginas (censored with a "Congratulation" graphic). Congratulation!
- Hard to explain – Two odd-looking women with broad Birmingham accents explain something from popular culture as if it were unknown (e.g. IKEA, which they describe as "always all yellow", "done up in all these rooms... but you're not allowed to sleep in them" and somewhere couples can go to argue). They always begin with the phrase "it's quite hard to explain if you've never seen it" and end by making an apparently unwitting sexual innuendo ("and then we just go out cock-hunting; you know, hunting for cockerels").
- The Lane – A soap opera sponsored by Ultra Vision Lenses in which, in a satire of product placement, all the characters wear glasses and most of the storylines relate to vision problems.
- Rice Britannia – A spoof of cookery competition shows such as MasterChef and The Great British Bake Off in which contestants compete for the chance to cook rice "atop the home of rice, the Great Wall of China".
- Ignition – A spoof of The Apprentice. A car wash company discuss ways to improve business, which often uses well-known stereotypical quotes from The Apprentice such as: "I'd like to stop you there" and "As project manager...".
- Various spoof German TV shows, in which the dialogue is a pidgin German-English hybrid peppered with innuendo. Examples include a smutty German version of Countdown and an all-sausage version of Antiques Roadshow.
- The World's Most...', which pokes fun at the typical end-of-year review programmes and the Z-list celebrities featured on them.

== Production ==
Anna Crilly and Katy Wix had performed their Edinburgh Fringe Festival shows, first, in 2005 under the name "Penny Spubb" (Penny Spubb's Party 2005, and Penny Spubb's Prawn Free 2006, nominated for the Writers' Guild Award and Best Double Act - Edinburgh Festival), and later as Anna & Katy, in 2009.

In 2007, Katy Wix, and Anna Crilly as Penny Spubb's Ways To Change The World with Marek Larwood presented "the charitable story of 'The Widows of the Red Arrows'" on BBC Radio 7, as a pilot for a sketch show, a "non-audience narrative sketch show by Anna Crilly & Katy Wix".

On 11 December 2008 at The Drill Hall, a sketch show pilot starring Anna Crilly and Katy Wix for BBC Radio 2 was recorded, but never broadcast, based on their 2005 and 2006 Edinburgh shows.

On 2 March 2009 and 3 March 2009 at The Drill Hall, "Anna And Katy Salute You", an unbroadcast BBC TV sketch show pilot by Katy Wix and Anna Crilly was lensed by Avalon Television.

"You lose the nuance, I think, with a studio audience." - Anna Crilly

"We've done stuff on the web and just put it on YouTube, but then Channel 4 offered us loads of money to do it properly!" - Katy Wix

Dice Productions made some fake interstitial adverts.

They were not allowed to do comedy about Peter Kay.

== Reception ==
Emma Gosnell of The Daily Telegraph described the show as "a lot of fun" and described Wix and Crilly as "undoubtedly brilliant mimics", but added "However, some skits were simply absurd". Julie Raeside of The Guardian dismissed comparisons between the duo and French and Saunders, suggesting that "If Anna and Katy have to be "the new" anything... it really should be Reeves and Mortimer".

Metro.co.uk described the show as "little more than a lame college revue"

Time Out wrote: "The pair are strong on detail, skewering the grammar-mangling of ‘The Apprentice’ (‘you should have cleared that with myself’) and crafting a pungently German take on ‘Countdown’, complete with oompah band interludes."

It attracted a number of glowing reviews but performed poorly in the ratings, and Channel 4 decided not to recommission a second series. The series started with an audience of around half a million at 10:35pm Wednesday but steadily shed viewers.
