= Loaded (British TV series) =

- Genre: Comedy-drama
- Based on: Mesudarim by Muli Segev and Assaf Harel
- Developed by: Jon Brown (uncredited)
- Written by: Jon Brown; Georgia Pritchett; D. C. Jackson
- Directed by: Ian Fitzgibbon; Natalie Bailey; Elliot Hegarty
- Starring: Jim Howick; Samuel Anderson; Jonny Sweet; Nick Helm; Lolly Adefope; Aimee-Ffion Edwards; Mary McCormack
- Composer: Jack Arnold
- Country of origin: United Kingdom
- Original language: English
- No. of series: 1
- No. of episodes: 8

Production
- Executive producers: Howard Burch; Avi Nir; Muli Segev; Assaf Harel; Jon Brown; Polly Leys; Kate Norrish
- Producer: Charlie Leech
- Running time: 60 minutes (including adverts)
- Production companies: Hillbilly Television; Keshet UK

Original release
- Network: Channel 4
- Release: 8 May – 26 June 2017

Loaded is a British comedy drama television series produced by Hillbilly Television and Keshet UK for Channel 4. It is based on the Israeli series Mesudarim (Hebrew: מסודרים). The show premiered on 8 May 2017 and stars Jim Howick, Samuel Anderson, Jonny Sweet and Nick Helm as a group of tech entrepreneurs in their mid-20's who are about to shut their game company Idol Hands down but then become multi-millionaires. Eight episodes aired in series 1. The series was picked up in the United States by AMC, and premiered on 17 July 2017. Loaded was cancelled after one series by Channel 4.

== Cast ==
- Jim Howick as Josh
- Samuel Anderson as Leon
- Jonny Sweet as Ewan
- Nick Helm as Watto
- Mary McCormack as Casey
- Aimee-Ffion Edwards as Abi
- Lolly Adefope as Naomi
- Scarlett Alice Johnson as Paula

== Episodes ==
| No. | Title | Directed by | Written by | Original release date |
|---|---|---|---|---|
| 1 | "Lawsuit" | Ian Fitzgibbon | Jon Brown | 8 May 2017 |
Following the sale of their company Idyl Hands and its hit iPhone game Cat Factory, four friends and business partners - Josh, Leon, Watto and Ewan - wake up to the brilliant/terrifying realisation that they're now multi-millionaires. Josh treats his parents to an extravagant around-the-world trip in a backhanded effort to expose them to a bit of culture. But the company is almost immediately hit by a lawsuit; one of Watto's old associates claims to have invented a key element of the game. The gang instantly face losing everything they've worked so hard for. When the lawsuit is leaked online, their new US boss Casey soon reveals herself to be more ruthless than expected when she orders Leon to fire Watto.
| 2 | "Leon's Teacher" | Ian Fitzgibbon | Jon Brown | 15 May 2017 |
New boss Casey arrives from the US for a "flying visit" and immediately fires a rocket up the gang - they need to start developing new content. And fast. But the boys, freshly-minted millionaires, have other things on their mind. Leon returns to his former school as the conquering hero in a desperate and somewhat pathetic bid to impress his old teacher. Josh gets involved in a charity event in a bid to impress ex-girlfriend Abi. Watto struggles to reconcile his new moneyed status with his hardcore punk background and Ewan fights to make a positive impression on their new boss. When the grim spectre of churning out a cynical sequel to Cat Factory 2 rears its ugly head, the gang stand firm. Casey relents: "No sequel." But on one condition - she moves to London permanently.... "Just for a bit of oversight..."
| 3 | "Josh's Mum and Dad" | Ian Fitzgibbon | Jon Brown | 22 May 2017 |
The boys pitch Casey their idea for a new game. Unimpressed, she decides to conduct a full and brutal "personnel audit" to review what exactly each of them does for the company. In the case of Leon, the results are less than clear. Watto's addictions begin to manifest themselves in peculiar ways. And Josh gets distracted when his parents return early from the three-month cultural world trip he gifted them. His mum has had her eyes opened. Maybe just a little too wide. With a tattoo and a new set of teeth, she's looking at a bright new future; one that may or may not involve Josh's dad. Josh sets out on a guilt ridden-quest to save his parents relationship, enlisting 'surrogate son' Leon's help with less than helpful consequences.
| 4 | "Watto's Mum" | Natalie Bailey | Georgia Pritchett | 29 May 2017 |
Watto's ecstatic when his errant mum arrives back on the scene, seemingly oblivious to her son's multimillion pound fortune and claiming to have made one all of her own. The Gang are initially impressed. But Ewan's growing suspicions lead him to stage an intervention that goes horribly awry. Casey announces that her boss ("the Emperor") is flying to London specifically to hear Josh and Leon's pitch for the new game. Casey's rattled when she learns that they have nothing to pitch, but Abi surprisingly saves the day. Watto, desperate to keep his mum at close quarters, does everything he can think of to make her stay.
| 5 | "The Boat" | Natalie Bailey | Georgia Pritchett | 5 June 2017 |
In a bid to get the Gang to focus on the new game, Leon takes them away for a trip on his new luxury yacht. What follow is 24-hours of drugs, murder and sex. Ewan falls for the Chef, but tries to play down his wealth by pretending he's a paid employee of the Gang. Josh discovers that Leon's paid someone to compile a dossier on Abi and finds himself sucked into the deceit. The Gang end up run aground, both literally and metaphorically. They're broken. They have nothing. Until Watto finds inspiration via an encounter with a Chinese fisherman.
| 6 | "The Red List" | Elliot Hegarty | Jon Brown & D.C. Jackson | 12 June 2017 |
Josh accompanies Abi to a business start-up speed-funding event. Watto finds an unlikely soul-mate and Leon's new closeness to Casey brings about an unlikely revelation.
| 7 | "The Expo" | Elliot Hegarty | Jon Brown | 19 June 2017 |
The gang are looking forward to launching their long-awaited new game at the Expo, but Watto has other ideas.
| 8 | "The End of Cat Factory?" | Elliot Hegarty | Jon Brown | 26 June 2017 |
Ewan faces an unusual moral dilemma after he receives an opportunity for wealth beyond his wildest dreams.
