= The Windsors =

Television series

- Genre: Sitcom/Parody
- Written by: George Jeffrie; Bert Tyler-Moore
- Directed by: Adam Miller
- Starring: Harry Enfield; Haydn Gwynne; Hugh Skinner
- Composer: Ian Masterson
- Country of origin: United Kingdom
- Original language: English
- No. of series: 3
- No. of episodes: 21

Production
- Executive producers: Robert Wulff-Cochrane; Camilla Campbell
- Producer: Izzy Mant
- Running time: 23–25 minutes Specials 48 minutes
- Production companies: Noho Film and TV

Original release
- Network: Channel 4 (HD)
- Release: 6 May 2016 – 30 April 2023

The Windsors is a British sitcom and parody of the British royal family, the House of Windsor. It was first broadcast on Channel 4 in April 2016 and stars Harry Enfield, Haydn Gwynne, Hugh Skinner, Louise Ford, Richard Goulding, Tom Durant-Pritchard, Kathryn Drysdale, Morgana Robinson, Ellie White, and Celeste Dring.

Written by the co-creators of Star Stories, Bert Tyler-Moore and George Jeffrie, The Windsors is a satirical portrayal of the British royal family. Following the death of Jeffrie from a heart attack in September 2020, Tyler-Moore became sole writer of the series.

A fourth series was scheduled to film in late 2023, following the broadcast of a Coronation special episode earlier in the year. Following the death of Haydn Gwynne, production was suspended in early 2024.

== Synopsis ==
The Windsors tells the story of the British royal family but re-imagined as a soap opera. Although the stories are completely fictional, they are inspired by real events.

== Cast ==
=== Main ===
- Harry Enfield as Prince (later King) Charles, the oldest son of and heir apparent to Elizabeth II, who spends the first three series impatiently waiting for his mother to die so he can finally be Head of the Commonwealth and King. He is portrayed as self-absorbed, naive, overconfident in his abilities, and prone to believe in comically absurd theories, having little knowledge of the world outside the monarchy. He also enjoys inventing whimsical ideas for which he feels under-appreciated. A running gag is his fondness for wearing kilts without any undergarments. He ascends to the throne in the Coronation special.
  - Enfield also portrays Charles' two-minutes-older identical twin brother Chuck in Series 2, Episode 3.
- Haydn Gwynne as Duchess (later Queen) Camilla, Charles' second wife, depicted as a stereotypical conniving villain determined to become Queen and replace Charles' lineage with her own while also redeeming herself in the eyes of the public as a result of usurping Diana's position. She fixates on various ways in which she might achieve this but never fulfills any of the schemes she imagines.
- Hugh Skinner as Prince William "Wills", Charles' first son and heir apparent, and the most well-meaning of the royals, whose manner of speech exaggerates parts of received pronunciation. He often attempts to leave the monarchy, to get it abolished, or to simply grow out of his family's shadow by pursuing interests and career opportunities outside of royal duties. He also receives advice and counsel from spirits of previous monarchs, as do his wife and brother.
- Louise Ford as Duchess (later Princess) Catherine "Kate" (née Middleton), Wills' wife, depicted as a former "gypsy" who wants to better fit in with the royals.
- Richard Goulding (Series 1–2, and Coronation special) and Tom Durant-Pritchard (Series 3) as Prince Harry, Wills' immature, naive younger brother, who is often taken advantage of by women and is illiterate until the end of Series 1.
- Kathryn Drysdale as Duchess Meghan (née Markle) (Series 2–3), Harry's second girlfriend and later his wife, portrayed as a shallow narcissist who is still obsessed with her time acting on the American legal drama TV series Suits and presenting herself as a "strong independent woman" despite her desire to marry Harry.
- Morgana Robinson as Pippa Middleton, Kate's sister, depicted as a passive-aggressive, greedy, promiscuous, and envious social climber. She pursues a relationship with Harry and continues trying to win him back after he begins dating Meghan.
- Ellie White as Princess Beatrice and Celeste Dring as Princess Eugenie, Wills and Harry's cousins, depicted as two useless, rich Sloanes searching for a purpose in life.

=== Recurring ===
- Matthew Cottle as Prince Edward, Charles' youngest brother, who fails at many things.
- Katy Wix as Sarah "Fergie" Ferguson, Beatrice and Eugenie's mother, who is desperate to be let back into the Royal Family's inner circle.
- Tim Wallers as Prince Andrew, Charles' younger brother and Fergie's former husband, portrayed as a sleazy and manipulative businessman.
- Vicki Pepperdine as Princess Anne, Charles' younger sister, depicted as austere, menacing, and almost ghostlike. Her sudden appearances are preceded by a drop in temperature that freezes people's breath. Her only passion is horses.
- Gordon Kennedy as Alec and Tony Jayawardena as Sandy (Series 1), two Scottish bystanders who comment on events.
- Donovan Blackwood as Baxter (Series 1), a military recruiter and drill instructor with whom Wills trains to become an air ambulance pilot.
- Anna Morris as Duchess Sophie (née Rhys-Jones) (Coronation special), Edward's wife.

=== Guests ===
- Gillian Bevan as Theresa May, the prime minister of the United Kingdom
- Corey Johnson as Donald Trump (Series 2-3), the president of the United States
- Joseph May as Justin Trudeau, the prime minister of Canada
- Phillip Law as Malcolm Turnbull, the prime minister of Australia
- Tom Basden as Jeremy Corbyn, the Leader of the Labour Party
- Jeremy Nicholas as David Dimbleby (Series 1), a celebrated political journalist who covers the public's vote on whether to abolish the monarchy.
- Ben Lambert as Johnny Mathers, a billionaire married to Pippa Middleton.
- Amy Booth-Steel as Nicola Sturgeon (Series 2), the First Minister of Scotland, who doubles as a villager nicknamed "Flame".
- Julia Deakin as Carole Middleton, Kate's mother
- Simon Day as Mike Middleton, Kate's father
- Tom Stourton as Jack Brooksbank, Eugenie's husband
- Mateo Oxley as Edo Mapelli Mozzi, Beatrice's husband
- Suzette Llewellyn as Doria Ragland, Meghan's mother
- Trevor Cooper as Thomas Markle, Meghan's father and Doria's former husband

=== Historical figures ===
- Tim FitzHigham as King Arthur
- Howard Lee as Alfred the Great
- David Newman as Richard the Lionheart
- Jolyon Coy as Henry V
- Al Roberts as Richard III
- James Doherty as Henry VIII
- Lucy Montgomery as Elizabeth I
- Gareth Tunley as Oliver Cromwell
- Dickie Beau as James VI and I
- Paul Whitehouse as George III
- Peter Davison as William IV
- Miriam Margolyes as Queen Victoria
- Michael Rouse as Prince Albert
- Clive Hayward as George VI, described by Wills in-universe as how he appears in the film The King's Speech.

== Episodes ==
=== Series overview ===
Series	Episodes	Originally released	
Series	Episodes	First released	Last released
1	6	6 May 2016	3 June 2016
Special		23 December 2016	
2	6	5 July 2017	16 August 2017
Special		15 May 2018	
3	6	25 February 2020	31 March 2020
Special		30 April 2023	

=== Series 1 (2016) ===
No.	Title	Original release date	Viewers (millions)
1	"Episode One"	6 May 2016	2.37
Charles tries to keep his family in order, but Wills wants to mingle with the people and he works as an air ambulance pilot. Pippa seduces Harry. Beatrice and Eugenie plan to start a business demonstrating make-up on social media. Kate volunteers to help Harry with his fancy dress charity ball.
2	"Episode Two"	6 May 2016	1.56
Kate and Wills visit a centre for asylum seekers but Kate contracts ebola and is hospitalised. Fergie wrongly believes her two daughters have been radicalised. Harry becomes attracted to Pippa, after she flirts with him. Camilla discovers she is pregnant.
3	"Episode Three"	13 May 2016	1.52
Charles finds out that he fathered a son, Richard, by one of The Three Degrees during the 1970s. Richard becomes second in line to the throne. William and Kate move to a semi-detached house in Rickmansworth, Hertfordshire, to live an ordinary, middle-class life. Richard is killed in a motorcycle crash, strongly implied to have been deliberately caused by Camilla sabotaging it. Harry is told to marry Australian Prime Minister Malcolm Turnbull's daughter, but at the last moment he decides not to. William and Kate return to royal life.
4	"Episode Four"	20 May 2016	1.82
Kate meets Justin Welby, the Archbishop of Canterbury. They get on almost too well and share a kiss. Wills wants to modernise the Royal Variety Show, while Harry goes on a bender when he learns that Pippa is getting married. Beatrice tries to solve her money problems by getting a job, and Camilla's plans suffer a setback.
5	"Episode Five"	27 May 2016	1.42
William calls for a referendum on the abolition of the monarchy which takes place.
6	"Episode Six"	3 June 2016	1.56
The Windsors deal with the outcome of the referendum; however, the monarchy being abolished turns out to be a dream in William's head – they in fact lost the referendum and the monarchy continued. Wills and Kate renew their vows and Camilla has a plan to put Charles back to first-in-line to the throne having given the title up to William.

=== Christmas special (2016) ===
No.	Title	Original release date	Viewers (millions)
7	"Christmas Special"	23 December 2016	1.28
The Windsors have Christmas at Sandringham, where Kate makes a mess of Christmas lunch and is almost lobotomised by Princess Anne and Camilla, and Harry becomes infatuated with Ellie Goulding which results in Pippa leaving him at the end of the episode for a recently recovered homeless amnesiac billionaire hedge-fund manager she met while somewhat unwillingly volunteering at a soup kitchen. Princesses Beatrice and Eugenie release a song online called 'Daddy come home for Christmas' which goes to number 1 in Azerbaijan. Elsewhere, Charles declares war on the European Union during a Christmas speech and Fergie realises that Andrew has been using her for tax avoidance.

=== Series 2 (2017) ===
No.	Title	Original release date	Viewers (millions)
1	"Episode One"	5 July 2017	1.28
Camilla thinks she has found a new friend in Prime Minister Theresa May and is determined to persuade Prince Charles to help secure a trade deal with the Chinese – but is she just a pawn in the PM's game.
2	"Episode Two"	12 July 2017	0.96
Harry opens a nightclub and asks Kate to DJ. Meanwhile, Wills learns the art of banter and Camilla decides to donate a kidney to a disabled 12-year-old to make the public finally like her. Charles and Camilla's home becomes rampaged by wild animals after Charles attempts to ban pesticides in the palace gardens.
3	"Episode Three"	19 July 2017	0.97
Kate is reluctant to join a pheasant shoot at Sandringham, Harry seeks revenge on Johnny, and Wills stumbles across his father's identical twin, Chuck.
4	"Episode Four"	26 July 2017	0.88
Kate and Wills visit Charles' traditionalist new town, Poundbury in Dorset. Pippa ponders whether she should leave Johnny after discovering that he has lost his fortune.
5	"Episode Five"	2 August 2017	N/A
The Royals gather at Balmoral. Camilla plots her revenge on Theresa May, Pippa plans to wreck Harry's relationship with Meghan, Charles is a hit with the Scots and Wills is shot by a Highland lassie, "Flame", who turns out to be Nicola Sturgeon off duty.
6	"Episode Six"	16 August 2017	N/A
Donald Trump (Corey Johnson) visits to offer an "endorsement" to Charles, but wants Camilla's favours in return. Wills awakens Theresa May from her coma by kissing her, and the new copy of Magna Carta is found to be a fake, putting an end to the idea of absolute monarchy. Pippa's hen party is attended by Beatrice, Eugenie and their mother. Harry tries to stop the wedding, but turns up too late.

=== Royal Wedding special (2018) ===
No.	Title	Original release date	Viewers (millions)
1	"Royal Wedding Special"	15 May 2018	N/A
In a "Royal Wedding Special", during the week leading up to the wedding of Prince Harry and Meghan Markle, Pippa plots to poison Meghan while fattening Kate up so that she will not be able to wear her wedding outfit. Princess Beatrice embarks on an affair with Jeremy Corbyn (played by Tom Basden). Fergie unexpectedly receives an invitation to the wedding, but it clashes with a lucrative opportunity to commentate on the wedding for a TV station.

=== Series 3 (2020) ===
No.	Title	Original release date	Viewers (millions)
1	"Episode One"	25 February 2020	N/A
With the country divided, the government have asked the royals to cheer up Britain. Wills, Kate, Harry and Meghan are excited to bring the British people together; meanwhile, Prince Charles, Princess Anne, Prince Edward and Prince Andrew, are striking from all royal duties in protest of the minimal rise to the Sovereign Grant. Confident that this will only make The Fab Four even more popular, Camilla plots to cause a rift between them. Meanwhile, Beatrice has set up a new drinks brand called 'GinVoddieRum' and wants Eugenie to be her business partner. The older royals are disheartened when nobody seems to notice that they're striking, so Charles tries to persuade Wills to join forces; Wills is torn and is given advice by a portrait of Queen Victoria.
2	"Episode Two"	3 March 2020	N/A
Charles and Camilla have reluctantly agreed to visit the Middletons' house with Wills and Kate. Longstanding rivalry between Kate and Pippa prevails when the race is on to get their father Mike Middleton the best birthday present. Meanwhile, Fergie has only got two VIP tickets to Glastonbury and has to choose between Beatrice and Eugenie. Harry and Meghan are enjoying married life, but when Meghan catches Harry in a compromising situation with Pippa, Harry is in trouble. Charles overhears Mike on the phone, threatening to chop off Charles and Camilla's heads. He tells Camilla, who has had enough of Carole.
3	"Episode Three"	10 March 2020	N/A
Camilla warns Charles that the nation thinks he's an eccentric crank. In a bid to prove her wrong, Charles befriends a blind man who doesn't recognise him and can judge his ideas on their merits. Wills wants his Duke of Edinburgh Gold Award, and Uncle Edward agrees to help him. Once out in open countryside, though, they're kidnapped by an unscrupulous farmer, who sees them as cheap labour. Meghan thinks Kate is behaving strangely and discovers that she has been replaced by a robot. When confronted by the real Kate and robot Kate, Meghan can't tell them apart. Meanwhile, Beatrice worries that Eugenie only got her art gallery job because she's a princess. After a boozy lunch, Eugenie discovers an original Banksy on a wall. In preparation for becoming King, Charles is given one of the Queen's roles: he's now Defender of the Faith.
4	"Episode Four"	17 March 2020	N/A
Charles is taking his new role as Defender of All Faiths very seriously, so when the Highgrove village branch leader of the Church of Satan invites him to officiate a Black Mass, Charles accepts - much to Camilla's dismay. Wills wants to prove to Kate that he's man enough to handle their home renovations, but he is tricked by their builder into buying a £30 million platinum RSJ. Meanwhile, Kate is worried that Wills might be cheating on her. Beatrice and Eugenie are working as lowly chalet girls at Fergie's Verbier pad. Forced to attend the society event of the season in her mother's 1980s cast-offs, Beatrice catches the eye of Europe's most eligible bachelor, Count Edoardo Mapelli Mozzi. Harry meets his doppelganger on a hospital visit and they agree to swap lives for a day.
5	"Episode Five"	24 March 2020	N/A
Kate complains that royal duties are hard, so Pippa sets out to prove her wrong, while Beatrice and Eugenie are offered millions to be the face of a new Japanese perfume - on the condition they never associate with their mother again. Charles is smitten with the new manager of the Highgrove gift shop, while Anne has a schoolgirl crush on her special friend David Beckham. However, Wills fears that the footballer is only using Anne to get himself a knighthood. Meghan is horrified to discover the shocking secrets in Harry's family history, and announces her intention to return to America.
6	"Episode Six"	31 March 2020	N/A
Donald Trump invites Charles and Camilla to abandon England and become king and queen of America - but Wills suspect there is a sinister agenda behind the offer. Harry offers Pippa a job as his children's nanny, and Meghan makes a speech at the UN - but is persuaded to deliver it in Mandarin. Beatrice is disappointed that recent revelations will stop her father walking her down the aisle - but her mother is more than happy to step in.

=== Coronation special (2023) ===
No.	Title	Original release date	Viewers (millions)
1	"Coronation Special"	30 April 2023	1.71
Charles and Camilla clash with William on how opulent and extravagant the coronation should be, with Anne's frugal touch risking the ceremony being reduced to a motel conference room. Pippa goes to extraordinary lengths in her determination to attend the Coronation, with Prince Edward's wife Sophie as her target. Beatrice and Eugenie find themselves cast out into the cold and try to make a life for themselves outside of the royal family, while Harry and Meghan try to find their way back into the fold, albeit with an ulterior motive.

=== Prospective fourth series ===
A fourth series was unofficially confirmed in spring 2023, prior to the Coronation Special. Plots were revealed to include Charles prolonging his half-hour, weekly meeting with the Prime Minister into "an all-afternoon brainstorming session" and demanding a place in the Cabinet, Wills ending up in a "bromance" with a Welsh nationalist, Harry and Meghan rescuing New Zealand from the brink of leaving the Commonwealth, and Beatrice and Eugenie time-travelling and accidentally altering the order of succession.

Filming for the fourth series was stated as taking place in late 2023 or early 2024. Haydn Gwynne, who portrayed Camilla, died in October 2023.

In April 2024, it was announced that production had been indefinitely postponed on the fourth series, owing to real-life health scares affecting senior members of the Royal Family. It was also reported that plans had been arranged to recast the role of Camilla following Gwynne's death, or to write out the characters of Charles and Camilla completely to concentrate the series "on the younger generations, with Their Majesties 'away on tour'".

== Reception ==
The Guardian was favourable when it said "High-brow humour this is not. But, despite a number of cast and crew comparing the show to Spitting Image, The Windsors doesn't feel like satire: more a comic drama that makes the odd comment about monarchy."

Channel 4 described the show, in a statement: "The series is a wry take on what the soap opera of their lives (and loves) might just be like. Delving behind the headlines and gossip columns, The Windsors lets our imaginations run riot in this ludicrous parody. Imagine, who really controls the sceptre in Charles and Camilla's marriage? What do the Royals really think of Kate? Does Wills really want to be king? Will Harry ever take Pippa up the aisle or will they end on a bum note? And what do Beatrice and Eugenie actually do for a living?" C4's head of comedy Phil Clarke added: "In The Windsors, our much-loved Royal family is re-imagined through the lens of a soap opera, and although the stories are completely fictional, some are inspired by real events. As a result, writers Bert and George have outdone even the funniest, most ludicrous issue of Hello! magazine ever."

The Daily Telegraph wrote: "The Windsors was low-budget, crude and rude. But it was all done with such cacophonous relish that resistance was useless. There's not much of this kind of punk comedy around on television at the moment, where deep, mordant, The Office-style irony has long been the dominant mode. But who doesn't like a little mischief? You can be a fan of Beethoven and the Buzzcocks too."

In his review for The List, Brian Donaldson wrote: "A pitiful 'parody' of life down Buck House way . . . If you were writing a sitcom about the Royal Family, would you have Harry coming over as a bit thick, Fergie being rather attention-seeking and Camilla as a cartoon villain? Of course you wouldn't, as that would be way too obvious; though maybe you could go down that road and put a spin on it somehow? Not Jeffrie and Tyler-Moore as they do the obvious and a whole lot less, such as making Edward out to be a lost soul with an empty diary, having William as a square-jawed helicopter hero and Pippa enjoying people constantly gazing at her 'fantastic arse'. And most incredibly of all, the Duke of Edinburgh is, wait for it, a little bit racist. It's certainly gratifying to see some upcoming Fringe comedy acts landing parts, such as Ellie White and Celeste Dring as the all-too predictably shallow Beatrice and Eugenie while Katy Wix has a blast as their tragically pitiable mum. But, sadly, all the talent on show are let down by a woefully predictable and utterly laugh-free script. Off with their heads!"

Season 2 of The Windsors was described by The Guardian as 'riotous hilarity', while The Telegraph called it a "right royal romp".

Sam Wollaston, writing for The Guardian, said of the Royal Wedding Special, "I worried an hour might be a stretch, but I needn't have", and suggested that the characters of Beatrice and Eugenie should have their own spin-off series.

== Endgame stage play ==
On 9 June 2021, it was announced that a stage play called The Windsors: Endgame would open at the Prince of Wales Theatre in London's West End from 2 August to 9 October 2021. It was written by Jeffrie and Tyler-Moore, directed by Michael Fentiman and featured members of the cast from the TV show including Harry Enfield as Charles, Matthew Cottle as Edward, Tom Durant-Pritchard as Harry and Tim Wallers as Andrew.
