= The Big Flower Fight =

- Genre: Reality
- Presented by: Natasia Demetriou; Vic Reeves
- Judges: Kristen Griffith VanderYacht
- Country of origin: United Kingdom
- Original language: English
- No. of series: 1
- No. of episodes: 8

Production
- Running time: 40 minutes
- Production company: Multistory Media

Original release
- Network: Netflix
- Release: 18 May 2020

The Big Flower Fight is a British television competition programme first broadcast on Netflix on 18 May 2020. It is a contest in the style of The Great British Bake Off and The Great British Sewing Bee but with the craft of floral design instead of baking or sewing.

The show is presented by Natasia Demetriou and Vic Reeves, with Kristen Griffith-VanderYacht serving as a mentor and main judge, as well as a different guest judge in each episode.

The first season was filmed in Maidstone, Kent.

At the beginning of April 2021, Netflix had yet to announce any plans for a potential second season.

== Series 1 (2020) ==
=== Contestants ===
Contestants	Hometown or country
Henck and Yan	Netherlands and Denmark
Ralph and Jim	Eastbourne
Sarah and Jordan	Maryland
Andi and Helen	Somerset
Andrew and Ryan	London
Monet and Stephanie	Surrey and Hampshire
Nick and Taylor	New York City
Raymond and Chanelle	London
Declan and Eoghan	Dublin
Rachel and Delilah	Brooklyn

=== Results summary ===
Elimination chart
Doubles	1	2	3	4	5	6	7	8
Andrew and Ryan	TOP	IN	TOP	WIN	TOP	WIN	WIN	WINNERS
Henck and Yan	WIN	IN	WIN	TOP	IN	TOP	TOP	Runner-up
Ralph and Jim	IN	IN	IN	TOP	IN	IN	BTM	Runner-up
Sarah and Jordan	IN	TOP	BTM	BTM	WIN	BTM	OUT	
Andi and Helen	IN	IN	IN	IN	BTM	OUT		
Declan and Eoghan	IN	IN	IN	IN	OUT			
Raymond and Chanelle	IN	WIN	IN	OUT				
Nick and Taylor	IN	BTM	OUT					
Rachel and Delilah	BTM	OUT						
Monet and Stephanie	OUT							

Colour key:

The contestants won the challenge and were declared Best in Bloom
The contestants were one of the best, but were not the winners of the challenge
The contestants were neither in the top or in the bottom, thus advancing to the next round
The contestants were in the bottom but were not eliminated
The contestants were eliminated
The contestants reached the finals, but did not win the series
The contestants won the series

=== Episode themes and guest judges ===
Number	Episode theme	Guest judge
1st	Enormous Insects	Humaira Ikram
2nd	Fabulous Floral Fashion	Simon Lycett
3rd	Huge Hairy Beasts	James Alexander-Sinclair
4th	Giant Edible Thrones	James Wong
5th	Magnificent Mobiles	Melissa Richardson
6th	Sea Creatures	Sarah Eberle
7th	Green Giants	Sophie Walker
8th	Fairytale Finale	James Alexander-Sinclair
