= Together (2015 TV series) =

- Genre: Comedy
- Created by: Jonny Sweet
- Written by: Jonny Sweet
- Directed by: Annie Griffin
- Starring: Sarah Daykin; Alex Macqueen; Vicki Pepperdine; Jonny Sweet; Cara Theobold; Katy Wix
- Composer: Jim Sutherland
- Country of origin: United Kingdom
- Original language: English
- No. of series: 1
- No. of episodes: 6

Production
- Producer: Lucy Armitage
- Camera setup: Single camera
- Running time: 30 minutes
- Production company: Tiger Aspect Productions

Original release
- Network: BBC Three
- Release: 6 October – 10 November 2015

Together is a six-episode 2015 television sitcom created and written by Jonny Sweet for BBC Three and set in London. It is about two twentysomethings during the early stages of a relationship. The show only has one series.

== Cast ==
- Jonny Sweet as Tom
- Cara Theobold as Ellen
- Alex Macqueen as Ashley
- Vicki Pepperdine as Lesley
- Katy Wix as Maeve
- Sarah Daykin as Hermione

== Episodes ==
No.	Title	Directed by	Written by	Original release date	U.K. viewers (millions)
1	"Signs"	Annie Griffin	Jonny Sweet	6 October 2015	N/A
Tom accidentally runs his bike into Ellen's car door when she opens it, Tom Soon realizes that he's seen her before.
2	"The Real You"	Annie Griffin	Jonny Sweet	13 October 2015	N/A
When Tom and Ellen go on their first date he tells a lie about where he lives, he is determined to tell the truth during a second date. He wrangles a fancy restaurant booking from a friend but has to take his sister too as a double date... Meanwhile Ellen is getting a bit sick of her demanding flatmate and wants to leave. But she has other concerns like an interrogation from the police about her road rage. With the world's most laid back lawyer and a cop who is a little to open she may not make it to their second date
3	"Cupid"	Annie Griffin	Jonny Sweet	20 October 2015	N/A
It Ellen birthday and tom Wants to make it special but is horrified when he does not have enough funds to buy her a gift. He eventually is inspired into transforming Ellen's Birthday by inviting her round for the lasagna she misses so much. Meanwhile it's Ellen's court hearing for her road rage. Forced to obey a curfure and wear an electronic tag Ellen is determined to have a nice date with tom. What could go wrong?
4	"Sharpe"	Annie Griffin	Jonny Sweet	27 October 2015	N/A
Tom invites Ellen to the most romantic place in Britain. Things are complicated when he misreads the signals and suggests a few friends come including to his horror Ellen's perfect ex Luke Ellen is not happy either as spending time with tom becomes increasingly hard and Luke is always around her being a bit reluctant to take no for an answer!!!
5	"The Lovers"	Annie Griffin	Jonny Sweet	3 November 2015	N/A
It's the hottest day of the year and everyone is either on heat or in uniform.
6	"Homing"	Annie Griffin	Jonny Sweet	10 November 2015	N/A
Tom and Ellen are officially a couple and could not be happier She is coming to tom's for tea Then Tom's Dad finds out that Ellen's got a criminal record, just as she is having her tag removed....
