= Bird Island (radio series) =

- Genre: Situation comedy
- Running time: 15 minutes
- Country of origin: United Kingdom
- Language(s): English
- Home station: BBC Radio 4
- Starring: Reece Shearsmith; Julian Rhind-Tutt; Katy Wix
- Written by: Katy Wix
- Produced by: Tilusha Ghelani
- Original release: 13 June 2012 – 27 May 2014
- No. of series: 2
- No. of episodes: 8
- Audio format: Stereophonic sound
- Website: https://www.bbc.co.uk/programmes/b042qmth

Bird Island is a comedy radio series which stars Reece Shearsmith and was written by Katy Wix. The show was broadcast on BBC Radio 4 and ran for two series.

== Plot ==
Ben Jones (Shearsmith), a 34-year-old ornithologist working in the sub-Antarctic on the fictional Bird Island. Working at a research station alongside boss Graham (Julian Rhind-Tutt), he tries to adapt to the cold solitude by keeping an audio diary of events at the research station as interactions with Graham are often awkward due to Ben's nerdy humour.

== Cast ==
- Reece Shearsmith as Ben Jones
- Julian Rhind-Tutt as Graham
- Katy Wix as Jane
- Alison Steadman as Ben's mother

== Episodes ==
=== Series one ===
No. overall	No. in series	Title	Original release date
1	1	"Episode One"	13 June 2012
Ornithologist Ben arrives on Bird Island in sub-Antarctica with supervisor Graham as the only company. He loses his watch, has an encounter with a nesting mother bird and sets up a profile on a dating website.
2	2	"Episode Two"	20 June 2012
Food supplies are running short at the base as the resupply ship is late arriving, with Ben and Graham resorting to taking a stock count. When a delivery finally does arrive, they have to contend with a drunk Italian.
3	3	"Episode Three"	27 June 2012
Ben finds an injured seal pup which out on the ice, and takes it back to base to nurse it to health. He shares the progress via video conference with his parents where he finds his dad Robin is changing his name by deed poll.
4	4	"Episode Four"	4 July 2012
Ben continues his search for a mate on the dating website. Graham reveals that a new member of the team will be arriving soon to join them to complete the Penguin census, leaving Ben unprepared for a third wheel.

=== Series two ===
No. overall	No. in series	Title	Original release date
5	1	"Episode One"	4 May 2014
Ben has received and enjoys a new, hard-to-open cereal bar. Some post has also been delivered to the wrong island, and Ben hears from his mother whose cat has gone missing. Graham ruins the end of Inspector Morse for Ben.
6	2	"Episode Two"	13 May 2014
Ben is becoming addicted to playing solitaire as part of a morning routine. He also has the task of testing out a new coat for a product trial and heads for the cold outdoors. Jane is celebrating her birthday.
7	3	"Episode Three"	20 May 2014
The bathroom lock has broken, which results in an embarrassing situation for Jane while Ben is taking a bath. Graham makes an attempt at teaching Ben how to abseil the ice cliffs as part of a safety course.
8	4	"Episode Four"	27 May 2014
Ben makes the mistake of volunteering to collect seal faeces, and decides to enter a poetry competition. Graham announces that he has decided to leave the island and return home due to issues with his marriage.

== Broadcast history ==
The first series, which ran for four episodes, was aired on 13 June 2012. A second series of four episodes was commissioned and aired from 4 May 2014.

Repeat airings have been made on BBC Radio 4 Extra.
