= Jonny Sweet =

British comedian

- Born: Jonathan Huw Sweet; 1985 (age 40–41); Nottingham, England
- Occupations: Actor, comedian, writer
- Years active: 2008–present

Jonathan Huw Sweet (born 1985) is a British comedian and the recipient of the 2009 Edinburgh Comedy Award for best newcomer.

== Early life ==
Sweet was born in Nottingham and educated at the local independent school Nottingham High School. He read English at Pembroke College, Cambridge and met writing partner Joe Thomas, and both were members of the Footlights. Sweet served as vice-president to Simon Bird while Thomas was secretary. After graduating, the three shared a flat together before their big break into comedy and television. He graduated with a first and was expected to follow his father into the legal profession but joined Endemol UK on an internship instead. He is a supporter of Nottingham Forest Football Club.

== Career ==
In 2009 Sweet won The Edinburgh Comedy Award for best newcomer for his show 'Mostly About Arthur'. He also starred in Tom Basden's debut play Party alongside Basden himself, 2009 Edinburgh Comedy Award winner Tim Key, Anna Crilly, Katy Wix and Nick Mohammed. The play won a Fringe First before travelling to the Sydney Arts Festival and appearing in London's West End and in adaptation as a BBC Radio 4 sitcom.

Sweet became known for playing posh characters after his role as future Prime Minister David Cameron in the 2009 More 4 satirical show When Boris Met Dave, which details how Cameron and Mayor of London Boris Johnson first met. He also appeared alongside Alistair McGowan, Adrian Edmondson and Hugh Dennis in Pete and Dud: The Lost Sketches, a revival of Peter Cook and Dudley Moore's works on BBC Two.

In 2012, he had a small role in BBC's Him & Her as one of Paul's newly found relatives.

He is also writing partner with Inbetweeners stars Simon Bird and Joe Thomas and together they make up the sketch group The House of Windsor. Following their critically acclaimed Edinburgh show The Meeting, they are now developing projects together for TV and film. Their period sitcom Chickens, about 3 conscientious objectors during World War I was broadcast in Autumn on Sky One, also starring Barry Humphries. Thomas and Sweet have also performed as a double-act, garnering many rave reviews and being nominated for a Writer's Guild Award.

He has recorded two series of his Radio 4 sitcom, Hard to Tell, a romance, starring Charlotte Ritchie as his love interest. The structure mainly consists of conversation between Tom (Sweet) and his sister Maeve (Katy Wix) telling his side of the developing romance, and between Ellen (Ritchie) and best friend Hermione (Sarah Solomani). In 2013, he was nominated for the Best Breakthrough Artist at the British Comedy Awards.

In 2014 Sweet starred as Tom Oliver in the Channel 4 police comedy-drama series Babylon. In 2015, Sweet created, wrote and starred in the BBC sitcom Together based loosely on his radio series Hard to Tell. He also wrote an episode of Tom Basden's E4 series Gap Year.

In mid-2017 Sweet starred in the sitcom Loaded (Channel 4), about a group of IT entrepreneurs who become millionaires when their company is bought out.

Sweet's debut novel, The Kellerby Code, was published by Faber in March 2024.

== Filmography ==
=== Film ===
Year	Film	Role	Director	Notes
2011	A Trick of the Light	Jonny	Vanessa Whyte	Short film Also co-writer
2012	Get Lucky	Christopher Hound	Norma Burke	Short film
2012	Asylum Seekers	Begbie Adams	Hollie Ebdon	Short film
2016	The Darkest Universe	Howard	Will Sharpe; Tom Kingsley	
2018	Dead to the World	Ben	Freddie Hall	Short film
2018	Johnny English Strikes Again	Tour Guide	David Kerr	
2019	Greed	Jules	Michael Winterbottom	
2023	Wicked Little Letters	Daily Mail Reporter	Thea Sharrock	Also Writer

=== TV series ===
Year	Title	Role	Notes
2008	Delta Forever	Johnny	1.01 "Pilot"
2009	Not Safe for Work	Andy	Television film
2009	Brave Young Men	Mr. Knowles	Television film
2009	The Inbetweeners	Dean	Episode: "A Night Out in London"
2009	When Boris Met Dave	David Cameron	Television documentary
2009	Off the Hook	Figaro	1.06 "Series 1, Episode 6"
2010	Pete & Dud: The Lost Sketches	Performer	Television film
2010	Popatron	Giles Stone	3 episodes
2011	Comedy Showcase	Bert Walpole	3.01 "Chickens"; Also co-writer
2011–2013	Chickens	Bert Walpole	7 episodes Also co-writer
2012–2013	Him & Her	Ian	5 episodes
2012	Threesome	Billy	2.02 "Vacuum"
2012	Games On		1.01 "Curby"
2012	Twenty Twelve	Justin Carter	2.01 "Boycott: Part 1"
2013	Playhouse Presents	Freddie Fleet	2.06 "Stage Door Johnnies"
2014	Plebs	Julius Priscus	2.06 "The Candidate"
2014	Babylon	Tom Oliver	7 episodes
2015	Together	Tom	6 episodes Also creator and writer
2017	Loaded	Ewan	8 episodes
2022	I Hate You	Bob Oxygen	5 episodes

== Writing credits ==
Production	Notes	Broadcaster/Distributor
Comedy Showcase	"Chickens" (2011)	Channel 4
A Trick of the Light	Short film (co-written with Joe Thomas, 2011)	Cargo Collective
Chickens	5 episodes (2013)	Channel 4
Together	6 episodes (2015)	BBC Three
Gap Year	"Kuala Lumpur: The Expats" (2017)	E4
Wicked Little Letters	Film (2023)	StudioCanal
