= Katy Wix =

Welsh actress, comedian and author (born 1980)

- Born: Katy Victoria J Wix; 28 February 1980 (age 46); Vale of Glamorgan, Wales
- Education: Royal Welsh College of Music & Drama
- Occupations: Actress, comedian, author
- Years active: 2006–present

Katy Victoria J Wix (born 28 February 1980) is a Welsh actress, comedian, writer, author and artist. Her television roles include Daisy in Not Going Out, Carole in Stath Lets Flats, Mary in Ghosts, Barbara in Ted Lasso, and Jules in Big Boys. She has also appeared as a series contestant on Taskmaster and as a recurring character in the science fiction mini-series Torchwood: Children of Earth in 2009. She has written two series of her own: a sitcom for BBC Radio 4, Bird Island and a sketch show for Channel 4, Anna & Katy. In 2017, her painting was chosen for the Royal Academy of Arts Summer Exhibition. She has written two books of monologues and in 2021 she published her first memoir, Delicacy.

== Early life ==
Wix was born in the Vale of Glamorgan and raised in Peterston-super-Ely, near Cardiff. Her mother and father both went to drama school and worked as actors before transitioning into careers in, respectively, arts administration and stage management. Her brother is a musician. She attended the University of Warwick in Coventry before going on to the Royal Welsh College of Music & Drama.

== Career ==
While studying at the Royal Welsh College of Music & Drama, Wix entered the Funny Women competition. She met comedian Anna Crilly in the competition and they later performed as a double act.

In 2007, Wix joined the cast of sitcom Not Going Out as recurring character Daisy and then went on to be a regular from series 3 until her final appearance in the 2015 Christmas special. In Torchwood: Children of Earth she plays Rhiannon Davies, the sister of Ianto Jones. In 2010, she presented the BBC Three series The King Is Dead. She also played Gemma in the first two series of Agatha Raisin (2014–2022).

She played Phoebe in Tom Basden's stage comedy Party and its subsequent three series spin-off on BBC Radio 4 also called Party. Wix wrote and co-starred in the same station's comedy series Bird Island.

In 2017, for the BBC, she portrayed Nurse Cornish in an episode of the TV crime drama Sherlock, and Florence Fagin in the TV dramatisation of Decline and Fall. She also featured in the radio series Ankle Tag (BBC Radio 4) and The Accidental AM (BBC Radio Wales). She also played Mary, one of the main characters, in the 2019 BBC One sitcom Ghosts before being "sucked off" in Series Four.

In 2021, she published Delicacy: a memoir of cake and death, a feminist memoir in which she recounts 21 life-defining moments to do with loss, body image, recovery from eating disorder and love.

== Personal life ==
Aged 26, Wix was involved in a serious car crash and suffered numerous broken bones, which has affected her health ever since.

When filming Taskmaster, Wix was absent from two episodes. She had been unable to attend the scheduled studio-based filming because, after attending A&E in extreme pain, the problem was found to be caused by gallstones. Wix was immediately admitted to hospital, where she had her gall bladder removed.

== Filmography ==
=== Film ===
Year	Title	Role	Notes
2007	Twelve in a Box	Andrea	
2007	Magicians	Waitress	
2007	Where Have I Been All Your Life?	Suzie	Short films
2009	Cut and Paste	Brenda	Short films
2010	Phone Pen	(unknown role)	Short films
2012	ShopGirl Blog	ShopGirl	Short films
2013	The Harry Hill Movie	Sat Nav Sheila / Shell Girl	
2019	Horrible Histories: The Movie – Rotten Romans	Watling Street Presenter	(as Katie Wix)
2019	Hamsbury Book Club	Harriet	Short films
2023	Pobi Bachyn	Gwenno	Short films
2023	Freelancer	Ellie	Short films
2025	Deep Cover	Lotta	
2026	Practical Magic 2	Paula	

=== Television ===
Year	Title	Role	Notes
2006	Time Trumpet	(unknown role)	Series 1; episodes 3, 4 and 6
2006	Extras	Girl in Nightclub	Series 2; episode 2: "David Bowie"
2007	Comedy Cuts	(unknown role)	ITV2 comedy programme
2007	Comedy: Shuffle	Various characters	Series 1; episode 3: "Frankie Boyle"
2007	Rush Hour	Chantaigne	Episodes 1–6
2007	Get a Grip	Various characters	Episode 5
2007	The Omid Djalili Show	(unknown role)	Series 1; episode 4
2007–2015	Not Going Out	Daisy	Series regular. Series 2–7; 42 episodes
2008	Headcases	Various characters (voice)	5 episodes
2009	FM	Izzy	Series 1; episode 5: "Video Killed the Radio Star"
2009	Al Murray's Multiple Personality Disorder	Various characters	Episodes 1–7
2009	Torchwood	Rhiannon Davies	Series 3; episodes 1–5: "Children of Earth: Days One to Five"
2009	Miranda	Fanny	Series 1; episodes 1 and 6: "Date" and "Dog"
2009–2011	Horrible Histories	Various characters	Series 1–3; 10 episodes
2010	Outnumbered	Fiona	Series 3; episode 4: "The Pigeon"
2010	Trinny & Susannah: From Boom to Bust	Gemma	Television film
2010	Trinny & Susannah: What They Did Next	Gemma	8 episodes
2010	The King Is Dead	Herself - Co-presenter	Episodes 1–7
2010	Comedy Lab	Laura MacDougal	Series 11; episode 7: "MovieMash"
2011	Comedy Lab	Various characters	Series 12; episode 1: "Anna & Katy" (pilot for its series). Also co-writer
2011	Dick and Dom's Funny Business	Various characters	Episode 8: "In It to Win It with Jessica Hynes"
2011	Comic Relief: Uptown Downstairs Abbey	Youngest Daughter	2-part sketch as part of Red Nose Day 2011
2011	Horrible Histories with Stephen Fry	Various characters	4 episodes
2011	Absolutely Fabulous	Annabelle	Series 6; episode 1: "Identity"
2011	Comedy Showcase	Sarah / Toni / Fanny	Series 3; episodes 2, 3 and 7: "Coma Girl", "The Fun Police" and "Felix & Murdo"
2012	Tickety Toc	Chikidee (voice)	Series 1; episodes 40 and 52: "Story Time" and "Igloo Time"
2013	Anna & Katy	Various characters	Episodes 1–6. Also co-writer
2014	Comedy Feeds	Mary	Series 3; episode 2: "Fried"
2014	Crackanory	Zara	Series 2; episode 2: "Man's Best Friend & Return to Sender"
2014	Agatha Raisin and the Quiche of Death	Gemma Simpson	Television film (pilot for its series)
2014	Fried	Mary Fawn	Pilot episode (on BBC iPlayer)
2015	Fried	Mary Fawn	Episodes 1–6 (on BBC Three)
2015	Funny Valentines	(unknown role)	Mini-series; episode 1; "Katy Wix: Dear Jean-Pierre"
2015	Together	Maeve	Episodes 1–6
2016	Dave Talks	Summer Girlfriend	Episode 4: "How to Turn Around, All the Way Around in a Circle"
2016	Year Friends	Sammi the Druid	Episode 6: "June"
2016	Lost Sitcoms	Hattie Jacques	Mini-series; episode: "Hancock's Half Hour"
2016–2018	Agatha Raisin	Gemma Simpson	Regular cast. Series 1 and 2; 10 episodes
2016–2020	The Windsors	Fergie	Series 1–3; 17 episodes
2017	Sherlock	Nurse Cornish	Series 4; episode 2: "The Lying Detective"
2017	Decline and Fall	Florence Fagan	Mini-series; episodes 1 and 2
2017	Summer Comedy Shorts	Blodwen	Mini-series; episode 5: "Ellie White & Vicki Pepperdine's Summer"
2017–2018	Doodlebugs	Various characters (voice)	Episodes 1–5
2018	Death in Paradise	Eva Ingram	Series 7; episode 6: "Meditated in Murder"
2018	Oi Leonardo!	(unknown role)	Mini-series; episode 1: "The Last Supper"
2018–2021	Stath Lets Flats	Carole	Main role. Series 1–3; 16 episodes
2019	Taskmaster	Herself - Contestant	Series 9; episodes 1–10
2019	This Time with Alan Partridge	Dr. Susan Lyle	Series 1; episode 6
2019	The Reluctant Landlord	Veronica Webster	Series 2; episode 5: "Dreadlock Jeff"
2019	Ladhood	Miss Monroe	Series 1; episode 3: "Down Days"
2019–2022	Ghosts	Mary	Main role. Series 1–4; 24 episodes
2021	Petrichor	Chloe Strinberg	Mini-series; episode 4
2021	Celebrity Mastermind	Herself - Contender	Series 19; episode 14
2022	The Witchfinder	Martha Pleased	Episode 2
2022	Here We Go	Kim	Series 1; episode 2: "Amy's Job Interview"
2022	Ellie & Natasia	Katy	Series 1; episode 6
2022	Don't Hug Me I'm Scared	Sad Square Tissue Box (voice)	Episode 2: "Death"
2022–2025	Big Boys	Jules Handy	Main role. Series 1–3; 16 episodes
2023	A Whole Lifetime with Jamie Demetriou	Bav Davison	Television special
2023	Men Up	Joanna Wootle	Television film
2023–	Ted Lasso	Barbara	Season 3-4; 10 episodes

=== Radio ===
Year	Title	Role	Notes
2010–2012	Party	Phoebe	All 3 series
2012	Bird Island	Jane	All episodes. Also writer
2017	Ankle Tag	Alice	6 episodes (replaced by Margaret Cabourn-Smith for the final 2 episodes of series 2)
2017	The Accidental AM	Hayley	All episodes
2014–2024	Tim Key's Late Night Poetry Programme	Megan	Series 2–5

== Awards and nominations ==
Year	Association	Category	Project	Result	Ref.
2022	Royal Television Society Programme Awards	Comedy Performance: Female	Stath Lets Flats	Nominated	
2023	BAFTA Cymru	Best Actress	Big Boys	Nominated	
2023	Screen Actors Guild Awards	Outstanding Performance by an Ensemble in a Comedy Series	Ted Lasso	Nominated	
