= Mat Ewins =

English actor, writer and stand-up comedian

- Born: Matthew Ewins; London, England
- Occupations: Actor, writer, comedian
- Years active: 2012–present

Mat Ewins is an English actor, writer and stand-up comedian.

His comedy shows are anarchic audiovisual experiences with multimedia features, including video clips and elements from computer games he programs himself.

== Life and career ==
Ewins studied at Bristol University where he was a member of sketch comedy troupe The Bristol Revunions. He started doing stand-up in 2003 and debuted at the Edinburgh Festival in 2011.

=== Stage ===
Ewins has performed various characters on The Bearpit Podcast (Podcast), a live comedy show set up as a fictional podcast. Co-creators of the show and fellow performers were Lolly Adefope, Richard Gadd, Matt Winning, Fin Taylor and Adam Hess.

He performed his solo show Adventureman 7, dubbed a ‘declaration of independence from seriousness’, at the 2017 Edinburgh Festival and the Vault festival. The show was nominated for Best Show at the 2017 Edinburgh Festival.

He won Best Show at the Comedians' Choice Awards 2017. He had also won the award in 2016 for his previous show Mat Ewins will make you a star. Ewins was a Chortle Student Comedy Award finalist in 2009.

His 2018 Edinburgh show was entitled What Sorry? My Mistake! The Doors Are Not Open; The Show Has Been Cancelled. Do Not Have Your Tickets Ready!, followed in 2019 by Actually, Can I Have Eight Tickets Please?.

In August 2024, he was nominated for Best Show by the ISH Edinburgh Comedy Awards.

=== Edinburgh Festival, solo shows ===
Year	Show
2012	Bruce Hammers' Bananapocalypse
2013	Mat Ewins: Once Upon a Time in the Jest
2014	Mat Ewins: The Six Million Dollar Ewins
2015	Mat Ewins: Day Job
2016	Mat Ewins: Mat Ewins Will Make You a Star
2017	Mat Ewins Presents Adventureman 7: The Return of Adventureman
2018	Mat Ewins: What Sorry? My Mistake! The Doors Are Not Open; The Show Has Been Cancelled. Do Not Have Your Tickets Ready!
2019	Mat Ewins: Actually Can I Have Eight Tickets Please?
2022	Mat Ewins: Danger Money
2023	Mat Ewins: Mr TikTok
2024	Mat Ewins: Ewins Some You Lose Some

=== Television and radio ===
In 2018, Ewins featured in BBC Three's stand-up comedy series Live from the BBC (series 3, episode 6). He has appeared on BBC Radio 4 and on BBC Radio 4 Extra's Sabotage (series 2, episode 1). In 2019, he was a guest on two episodes of the Channel 4 comedy show Harry Hill's Club Nite.

On 26 November 2019, Ewins participated in the comedy night The Paddock which was live-streamed by Channel 4.

On the 28th of January 2021, Ewins appeared in dictionary corner in Channels 4's panel show 8 Out of 10 Cats Does Countdown (Series 21 Episode 3).

== Personal life ==
In 2016, Ewins was living in North London where he shared a house with fellow comedian Richard Gadd.
