= Kathryn Wolfe =

British television director

Kathryn Wolfe is an English television director, author and university lecturer.

Kathryn was born and grew up in North London where she attended Henrietta Barnett Grammar School in Hampstead Garden Suburb. She went on to study BA Hons Drama at Bristol University and after graduating joined the BBC where she trained as a TV director.

Her father was TV situation comedy scriptwriter Ronald Wolfe. Her cousins include actor Warren Mitchell and Clive Wolfe Festival Director of the National Student Drama Festival (NSDF) 1971–2000. Kathryn was married to actor/writer/producer Arif Hussein, CEO of Kaos Films and founder of the British Short Screenplay Competition (BSSC), from 1996 until his death in London in 2021. They had two children.

In 2006 Kathryn was appointed Senior Lecturer Media Performance and Course Leader Television Production at the University of Bedfordshire. Her book So You Want To Be A TV Presenter? was published by Nick Hern Books in May 2010.

== TV Credits - Factual Programmes ==
Programme	Role	Production company
Resource Review	Director	Teachers TV
BETT Show 2005, 2006, 2007	Director	Teachers TV
The Buyer's Guide	Producer/Director	Teachers TV
Hot Management	Producer/Director	Teachers TV
Hot Research	Producer/Director	Teachers TV
21st Century Science	Director	Teachers TV
Road to the Beach	Director	Creative Partnerships
First Edition	Director	ITV
Drivers from Hell	Location Director	ITV
Diana Princess of the People	Location Director	ITV
Stunts & Stars of London's Burning	Producer Director	ITV
The West this Week *	Director	ITV
Weekend World	Location & Studio Director	ITV

(*)Award New York Film & TV Festival

== TV Credits - Children's Programmes ==
Programme	Role	Production company
The Carrot Club	Director	CBeebies
Tweenies Xmas Specials	Director 2x60 minutes	BBC
Tweenies Safety Interstitials	Director 26 programmes	BBC
Tweenies	Director 67 programmes	BBC
Teletubbies	Director- insert	BBC
Fun Song Factory	Studios Director	SKY
Ratkan & Droibee Time	Studio Director	The Children's Channel
Record Breakers	Series Director	BBC
Playschool	Writer/Director	BBC
Jackanory	Writer/Director	BBC
Wild Britain	Studio Director	BBC
Wildtrack	Live Studio Director	BBC
Animal Magic	Studio Director	BBC

== TV Credits - News/Live Programmes ==
Programme	Role	Production company
Breakfast Time	Live Studio Director - 1 year	BBC
London Plus	Live Studio Director - 6 months	BBC
HTV News	Live Studio Director - 1 year	HTV
Points West	Live Studio Director/vision mixer	BBC

== TV Credits - Drama Reconstruction Programmes ==
Programme	Role	Production company
Crimewatch UK	Location Director	BBC
Britain's Most Wanted	Series Director/Producer	ITV
Strange But True	Series Director/Producer	ITV
Crime Weekly	Series Director/Producer	ITV
One in a Million	Series Director/Producer	ITV
True Crimes	Director Pilot & Series 1&2	ITV
Crime Monthly	Series Director/Producer	ITV

== TV Credits - Magazine Programmes ==
Programme	Role	Production company
The Clothes Show	Series Location Director	BBC
Drivers from Hell	Location Director	ITV
Driving me Crazy	Series Location Director	LWT
Hodson Confidential	Series Director	ITV
The Six O’Clock Show	Live OB and Location Director	LWT
UK Today	Director/Producer	World Wide
