= Kaos Films =

British film production company

Kaos Films is a UK based production company founded in 2001 by actor/writer/director and producer Arif Hussein. Until 2011 its principal activity was running and managing the British Short Screenplay Competition (BSSC), described by Kenneth Branagh as "the most prestigious screenplay competition in the world" and the British Feature Screenplay Competition dubbed as "the richest competition in the world". In 2012, Kaos announced via its website that the competition would not be held in future years. "We have had wonderful eleven years and made some fantastic films of the winning scripts and one or two runners up too!"

== History ==
Kaos Films gained a reputation for supporting up and coming film talent, whether it be screenwriters, directors, producers or composers. They have supported a number of schemes which have helped young film makers.

In 2003 Kaos Films formed a partnership with the National Film and Television School NFTS. Kaos offers the top graduates of the NFTS a bridge into the industry.

Kaos Films also set up and sponsored the John Brabourne Big Five Award in partnership with the Cinema and Television Benevolent Fund - CTBF an industry charity. The winning director was offered the opportunity to direct his first film, working with a professional cast and crew - a step into the industry. The Award was presented by The Princess Royal at a star-studded event at BAFTA. The Award was part funded by the UK Film Council.

The company is now concentrating on developing and producing feature films

== Filmography ==
- The Handyman, 2006
- Like Father, 2007
- The Stars Don't Twinkle in Outer Space, 2008
- Crossing, 2009
- The Other Me, 2010
- The Happiness Salesman, 2010
- Waiting for Dawn, 2014
- A Room To Let, 2014
