= The Festival (film) =

2018 British comedy film directed by Iain Morris

- British release poster
- Directed by: Iain Morris
- Written by: Keith Akushie; Joe Parham
- Produced by: Claire Jones
- Starring: Joe Thomas; Hammed Animashaun; Claudia O'Doherty; Emma Rigby; Jemaine Clement
- Cinematography: Simon Tindall
- Edited by: Charlie Fawcett; William Webb
- Music by: Rael Jones
- Production companies: Film4 Productions; Fudge Park Productions
- Distributed by: Entertainment Film Distributors
- Release date: 14 August 2018 (United Kingdom)
- Running time: 98 minutes
- Country: United Kingdom
- Language: English
- Box office: $4.5 million

The Festival is a 2018 British comedy film directed by Iain Morris and co-written by Keith Akushie and Joe Parham. The film stars Joe Thomas, Hannah Tointon, Emma Rigby, Hammed Animashaun and Claudia O'Doherty.

== Plot ==
Nick Taylor's girlfriend, Caitlin, breaks up with him on the day of their graduation from university, and he humiliates himself at the ceremony by begging her to take him back.

Nick's friend Shane Simpson persuades him to attend the Giant Music Festival to get over Caitlin, as they have already bought their tickets and Shane wants to meet DJ Hammerhead (who performs wearing a hammerhead shark mask). On the train they meet Amy, a talkative, exuberant and jocund Australian who has attended the festival for nine consecutive years. Shane is drawn to her while Nick rebuffs her attempts to be friendly. Despite hiding from the conductor by pretending to have an orgy in the toilet, the three are ejected from the train for traveling on child tickets.

After reaching the event on foot, Nick and Shane search for a campsite while Amy goes to her usual location. They run into Caitlin and her wealthy and arrogant friends from university, who are staying together in a luxurious tent and invite Nick and Shane to stay. They also meet a man nicknamed Pirate because of his amputated leg, who has designs on Caitlin and puts Nick down by affecting to mistake his name for "Lick".

The group ventures out to enjoy the festival, with Nick preferring to hang back from the most crowded areas. Caitlin loses her phone; Nick sets out to find it and, after being urinated on by another man, brings it back to the tent. He is surprised by Caitlin and Pirate coming in, and tries to hide when they start having sex. Upon being discovered, Shane and Nick are ousted by the group and set up camp in the first available space they find.

The following morning, Shane and Nick find that they have camped next to Amy. They spend a day with her before encountering Caitlin and her friends again. Nick is humiliated by being knocked into the mud by a man who mistakes him for Harry Potter, and storms off back to his tent. Shane and Amy stumble upon a Druid wedding in the woods. The groom, Brother David, reveals that he is Hammerhead's manager and gives them backstage passes; he is then "bound to" his new bride, which turns out to be a male goat, with which he has prolonged sex in front of the other attendees. Meanwhile, Nick meets a girl dressed as a Smurf. She gives him half a pill of MDMA, and they enjoy a drug-fueled night, culminating in ecstatic sex in a stranger's car.

Nick wakes to find that she has left and he now has a nipple ring. Nick, Shane and Amy try to find Smurf Girl. They search piercing parlours, only to find that Nick had "My Name's Not Lick" tattooed on his buttock the night before and left a prosthetic leg behind. When Nick goes to apologise to Pirate, he finds that he and Smurf Girl trashed Caitlin's friends' luxury tent, and that it is somebody else's prosthetic leg. Amy, Nick and Shane find a Hen Party of women dressed as Smurfs, who promise them Smurf Girl's phone number if the boys perform a strip tease. They are arrested and their wristbands are confiscated so they cannot return to the event. They quarrel over Shane missing Hammerhead's performance due to Nick's negative outlook and self-centered behaviour.

Shane's stepfather Robin collects them to take them home. At a petrol station, Nick apologises to Shane and steals Robin's car, driving them back to the festival. They reunite with Amy and climb over a fence to gain re-entry, during which Nick injures his nipple by catching his piercing on a wire. Pirate, who is working security, tries to stop them from getting backstage but David vouches for them. Shane and Amy meet Hammerhead and Amy gives him one of her homemade Chaffney bars. Nick goes to have his injury tended to and finds Smurf Girl in the VIP bar, but she has little memory of him and no interest in seeing him again.

Hammerhead has an allergic reaction to the shellfish in the bar and, after Amy unsuccessfully tries to inject him with an EpiPen, Shane goes on in his place wearing the Hammerhead mask. Pirate tries to end the show by removing the mask and cutting off the music. Nick intervenes and they fight on stage as Shane starts to play music he has written himself, which the crowd loves. Amy removes Pirate's artificial leg and tosses it to Nick, who throws it into the crowd. Amy forgives Nick for ostracising her throughout the film; Shane and Amy then kiss on live camera. They try to jump into the audience, miscalculate the distance and fall to the ground, but are seen in the end credits crowd-surfing away from the stage.

The three return home by train. Shane and Amy are now a couple, and Nick sits next to a beautiful girl dressed as an elf—only again to hide from the conductor due to purchasing child tickets.

== Cast ==
- Joe Thomas as Nick Taylor
- Hammed Animashaun as Shane Simpson
- Claudia O'Doherty as Amy
- Hannah Tointon as Caitlin
- Kurt Yaeger as Pirate
- Jemaine Clement as Robin
- Noel Fielding as Hammerhead
- Lizzy Connolly as Lucy
- Chris Geere as Brother David
- Nick Frost as Ricky the Tattooist
- Emma Rigby as Smurf Girl
- Theo Barklem-Biggs as Gordy Symonds
- Leigh Williams as Clive The Newsagent
- Hugh Coles as Rex
- Jason Williamson as Police Officer

== Production ==
Parts of the film were filmed at Leeds festival with actual festival goers being used as extras in the large crowd scenes. Filming also took place in fields near to the village of Compton Martin in Somerset.

== Reception ==
On Rotten Tomatoes, the film has an approval rating of 81% based on reviews from 16 critics, with an average score of 5.9/10.
