= Stath Lets Flats =

British TV sitcom

- Title card
- Genre: Sitcom
- Created by: Jamie Demetriou
- Written by: Jamie Demetriou; Robert Popper
- Directed by: Tom Kingsley
- Starring: Jamie Demetriou; Natasia Demetriou; Katy Wix; Christos Stergioglou; Kiell Smith-Bynoe; Ellie White; Al Roberts
- Country of origin: United Kingdom
- Original language: English
- No. of series: 3
- No. of episodes: 18

Production
- Running time: 22–25 minutes
- Production company: Roughcut TV

Original release
- Network: Channel 4; HBO Max
- Release: 27 June 2018 – 30 November 2021

Stath Lets Flats is a British sitcom created by Jamie Demetriou that aired on Channel 4 from 27 June 2018 to 30 November 2021. The series stars Demetriou as Stath, an awkward and bumbling English Cypriot man who is employed at a London letting agent solely because his father owns it.

Demetriou co-wrote the series with Robert Popper. It is directed by Tom Kingsley. The series also stars Demetriou's sister Natasia Demetriou as Stath's sister Sophie, Christos Stergioglou as his father and boss Vasos, Katy Wix and Kiell Smith-Bynoe as his co-workers Carole and Dean, Ellie White as Sophie's friend Katia, and Al Roberts as Stath's co-worker and only friend Al. Alex Beckett had an early role as Marcus, and the show was dedicated to him following his suicide between the show's production and broadcast.

The series received praise for its writing and performances. In 2020, it won the BAFTA for Best Scripted Comedy while Demetriou won the BAFTA for Best Male Comedy Performance. The show also airs on HBO Max in the United States.

In January 2022, Demetriou said there were no plans at the time to make a fourth season, but that there may be one in the future. Several characters from the show returned for a sketch as part of Red Nose Day in March 2023.

== Premise ==
The series is based around a lettings agency in London run by a Greek family: father Vasos (Christos Stergioglou), and his two children Stath (Jamie Demetriou) and Sophie (Natasia Demetriou). Stath is flawed but over-confident, as Jamie says he "is someone who assumed he must be amazing because it would be incredibly inconvenient if he wasn’t".

== Cast and characters ==
=== Main ===
- Jamie Demetriou as Stath Charalambos, a bumbling Greek-Cypriot lettings agent working for his father’s business in London. He is desperate to prove his competence, but frequently ends up embarrassing himself.
- Natasia Demetriou as Sophie Charalambos, Stath’s cheerful, somewhat airheaded sister, who aspires to be a famous dancer or singer despite having no apparent talent.
- Christos Stergioglou as Vasos Charalambos, Stath and Sophie’s father and head of Michael and Eagle Lettings Agency, who wants to pass the family business on but doesn’t see his children as competent heirs. He is an immigrant from Cyprus, gay, and often speaks in strange metaphors and turns of phrase.
- Katy Wix as Carole Collins, an overachieving employee at Michael and Eagle who takes her job seriously. She and Stath are archrivals, though the two also have a child together as the result of a drunken one night stand.
- Al Roberts as Al Clark, another lettings agent at Michael and Eagle. Despite his social awkwardness and generally bland personality, he is idolized by Stath and Sophie, and is a love interest of the latter.
- Kiell Smith-Bynoe as Dean Townsend, a jaded lettings agent at Michael and Eagle who hates his job and frequently makes dry, sardonic comments.
- Alex Beckett as Marcus (season 1), a middle aged lettings agent at Michael and Eagle who loves rock music.
- Ellie White as Katia (main seasons 2-3; recurring season 1), Sophie’s Russian roommate and Stath’s on-and-off love interest, who has a strange and intense vibe.
- Dustin Demri-Burns as Julian (main season 2; recurring season 1), a rival lettings agent who eventually joins Michael and Eagle. His success makes Stath jealous and resentful.

=== Recurring ===
- Tom Stourton as Robbie, a lettings agent who works next door to Michael and Eagle.
- Haruka Abe as Tomoko (season 1), Al’s long-distance Japanese girlfriend.
- Jimmy Roussounis as Stephen (seasons 2-3), Vasos’ boyfriend, who later becomes his husband and stepdad to Stath and Sophie.
- David Mumeni as Cem (seasons 2-3), Sophie’s dimwitted boyfriend
- Kayode Ewumi as Bits (season 2), a client of Stath.
- Nick Mohammed as Anthony Stappan (seasons 2-3), a figure within the London lettings community.
- David Avery as Bambos (season 3), Stath’s cousin who briefly employs him at his barber shop.
- Charlie Cooper as Gregory, a lettings agent who sets up shop across the street from Michael and Eagle.

== Episodes ==
Series	Episodes	Originally released	
Series	Episodes	First released	Last released
1	6	27 June 2018	1 August 2018
2	6	19 August 2019	23 September 2019
3	6	26 October 2021	30 November 2021

=== Series 1 (2018) ===
No. overall	No. in series	Title	Directed by	Written by	Original release date	UK viewers (millions)
1	1	"A Pushy Boy"	Tom Kingsley	Jamie Demetriou	27 June 2018	0.97
Stath needs to impress his dad Vasos, who is also his boss, and let some flats after losing his patience and pushing a customer. Stath unsuccessfully attempts to gain more viewings to impress Vasos after he announces he is retiring. In the process he accidentally breaks his coworker Al's nose and then steals a viewing from another coworker, Carole, in order to try and let a flat, while Sophie and Al try to travel to A&E, despite not knowing the way. Stath then volunteers to get rid of a pigeon from tenant's flat.
2	2	"A Absolutely Garden"	Tom Kingsley	Jamie Demetriou & Robert Popper	4 July 2018	0.81
Stath goes out to help Sophie when his dad calls and ask him to let a house with a garden in a desirable area. Stath thinks this will be an easy win but it all goes wrong even with help from Sophie and Al.
3	3	"A Job Is a Change"	Tom Kingsley	Jamie Demetriou & Robert Popper	11 July 2018	0.78
After Stath accidentally burns down a property, he falls out with his exasperated dad, so he gets a job at the slick agency next door but struggles to fit in.
4	4	"A Completely Football"	Tom Kingsley	Jamie Demetriou	18 July 2018	N/A
Stath takes desperate measures to get on the annual inter-agency football tournament when he finds out he's been dropped from the team while Katia tries to attract his romantic attention.
5	5	"A Romance of Love"	Tom Kingsley	Jamie Demetriou	25 July 2018	N/A
After a night of drunken passion with former rival Carole, Stath is infatuated, Carole is less keen. And it's college results day for Sophie.
6	6	"It's a Manager Day"	Tom Kingsley	Jamie Demetriou	1 August 2018	0.63
It's Vasos' 70th birthday party and he has to decide who he will hand the business over to, Carole and Stath battle it out meanwhile Al is paid a surprise visit by his Japanese girlfriend.

=== Series 2 (2019) ===
No. overall	No. in series	Title	Original release date
7	1	"A Dreadfully New Time"	19 August 2019
New boss Julian is making changes at Michael & Eagle and Stath feels left behind. When Julian unveils a slick new promo with no mention of the family, Stath decides to make his own rival video. Meanwhile Sophie tries to move on from Al and focus on her music.
8	2	"Where Can I Flat?"	26 August 2019
When his dad announces that he needs to move out, Stath is forced to experience flat hunting from the other side. Sophie agrees to look with him but has mixed emotions when Stath invites newly single Al to join them.
9	3	"An Completely New Girl"	2 September 2019
Stath is struggling with the smart new clients brought in by Julian, until he meets Harriet, a well-meaning middle-class millennial, who takes a shine to him. But Stath soon finds himself out of his depth with her intellectual friends. Meanwhile Al uses his singing talents to get close to Sophie.
10	4	"A Battle of Our Lives"	9 September 2019
Michael & Eagle is under threat from a rival agency burning their signs. When their keys are stolen too, Stath is challenged to prove his bravery. Sophie finds herself caught up in the lettings agency war, when she falls for fellow dogsbody, Cem.
11	5	"A Stressfully Date"	16 September 2019
Stath is excited about his annual siblings dinner with Sophie, until she decides to invite new boyfriend Cem. Stath has to face up to the terrible state of his own love life, while Sophie gets second thoughts after a fun day out with Al.
12	6	"Congratulations, Please"	23 September 2019
Michael & Eagle are nominated for a local letting agents award, thanks to Julian's improvements. With their new partners and success for the family business, everything seems to be rosy for Stath, Sophie and their dad. But shocking revelations at the awards dinner threaten their happiness.

=== Series 3 (2021) ===
No. overall	No. in series	Title	Original release date
13	1	"A Children's Child"	26 October 2021
The business finds itself in trouble after losing the office and having to work out of Vasos' house. Stath looks to get his old job as a barber back to make ends meet while Carole is about to give birth.
14	2	"A Incredibly Young Woman"	2 November 2021
A rival lettings agent sets up across the road including Sophie's former boyfriend Cem, meanwhile Carole doesn't trust Stath & Katia to look after baby Dina.
15	3	"A Drink Because of Friendship"	9 November 2021
While Stath enjoys a lads' night with Al and Dean, Sophie and Katia take Carole for night out with the girls. Their blossoming friendships are threatened by Carole's poisonous sister Kris and a raucous open mic night at a popular letting agents' pub.
16	4	"A Actually Good Person"	16 November 2021
Stath is shamed online after being secretly filmed by a flat viewer. He tries to defend himself by appearing on Greek internet TV and performing a humiliating act for charity, which only threatens to bring more shame to Michael and Eagle.
17	5	"A Literally Earlier Year"	23 November 2021
A surprise stag do for Stath's dad Vasos turns nostalgic when the gang discover a home video of the early days of Michael and Eagle.
18	6	"Here Comes the Steven"	30 November 2021
Alone and struggling to start anew, Stath sees his dad's wedding as the perfect opportunity to win back the love of his life.

== Writing ==
Demetriou said that the series is set in a lettings agency because it "is a great base for comedy characters because it’s about people handing themselves the rope to hang themselves with." Some of the stories in the show are from Demetriou's own experiences of using lettings agents in London.

The final script came out of both prepared scripted work and improvisation.

== Reception ==
Critical reception for series 1 was highly positive. Sam Wollaston of The Guardian gave it a positive review saying that there was "plenty to like". Guy Pewsey of the Evening Standard said that it contained "moments of classic, unmistakably British, humour". Elisa Bray of the i said that it "roared along at speed with energy and absurdity".

The second series won multiple BAFTAs.

=== Awards and nominations ===
Award	Category	Nominee(s)	Result	Ref.
2018 I Talk Telly Awards	Best New Comedy Programme	Stath Lets Flats	Nominated	
2019 Broadcast Awards	Best Comedy Programme	Stath Lets Flats	Nominated	
2019 I Talk Telly Awards	Best Returning Comedy Programme	Stath Lets Flats	Nominated	
2019 British Academy Television Awards	Best Scripted Comedy	Stath Lets Flats	Nominated	
2019 British Academy Television Awards	Best Male Comedy Performance	Jamie Demetriou	Nominated	
2020 British Academy Television Awards	Best Scripted Comedy	Stath Lets Flats	Won	
2020 British Academy Television Awards	Best Male Comedy Performance	Jamie Demetriou	Won	
2020 British Academy Television Craft Awards	Best Writer: Comedy	Jamie Demetriou	Won	
2020 Broadcast Awards	Best Comedy Programme	Stath Lets Flats	Nominated	
2020 Edinburgh International Television Festival awards	Best Comedy Series	Stath Lets Flats	Nominated	
2022 British Academy Television Awards	Best Scripted Comedy	Stath Lets Flats	Nominated	
2022 British Academy Television Awards	Best Male Comedy Performance	Jamie Demetriou	Won	
2022 British Academy Television Awards	Best Female Comedy Performance	Natasia Demetriou	Nominated	
2022 Royal Television Society Programme Awards	Comedy Performance: Female	Katy Wix	Nominated	

== International adaptation ==
In December 2020, it was reported that Fox was developing an American adaptation of the series, titled Bren Rents with Joe Mande as writer and executive producer.
