= Claudia O'Doherty =

Australian actress and comedian

- Born: Sydney, Australia
- Occupations: Actress; comedian; writer
- Notable work: Love; Killing It

Claudia O'Doherty is an Australian actress, writer, and comedian. She won the 2009 Melbourne Fringe Best Comedy Award and the Brisbane Comedy Festival Award for her debut show Monsters of the Deep 3D. She has appeared in several films and TV series, including starring roles in Love and Killing It.

== Early life and education ==
Claudia O'Doherty is the daughter of Mental As Anything band member and artist Reg Mombassa (born Chris O'Doherty).

She attended SCEGGS Darlinghurst and the University of Sydney. At university, she participated in the Arts Revue and met Nick Coyle and Charlie Garber, with whom she began writing and performing under the name Pig Island.

== Career ==
O'Doherty's debut comedy show Monsters of the Deep 3D won the Best Comedy Award at the 2009 Melbourne Fringe Festival and the Best Comedy Award and the Brisbane Comedy Festival. The following year, she co-wrote the book 100 Facts About Pandas with David O'Doherty (no relation) and Mike Ahern, and worked together with them to co-write 100 Facts About Sharks in 2012. The same year, she appeared on the Australian television show Problems, and her stand-up show The Telescope was nominated for Best Comedy Show at the Edinburgh Festival Fringe.

O'Doherty moved to the UK and produced and starred in Claudia O'Doherty Comedy Blaps (2013), a web series produced for Channel 4. Bill Hader brought the videos to the attention of Amy Schumer and Judd Apatow, which led to O'Doherty being invited to audition for an upcoming film they were working on, Trainwreck. O'Doherty secured a minor role in the film.

In 2014, O'Doherty appeared in The Inbetweeners 2 as an airline rep. In January 2015, she appeared on the British panel show QI alongside Jimmy Carr, Suggs, regular panelist Alan Davies and host Stephen Fry.

O'Doherty has appeared several times on the Comedy Bang! Bang! podcast, usually playing an exaggerated version of a character also named Claudia O'Doherty. She appeared with "Weird Al" Yankovic, Jimmy Pardo, Nick Kroll, Stars, and Peaches, among others. She also acted on one episode of the Comedy Bang! Bang! TV series in 2015.

O'Doherty moved to the Los Angeles neighbourhood of Silver Lake and again worked with Amy Schumer, appearing in several episodes of Schumer's comedy series Inside Amy Schumer in 2015 and 2016. O'Doherty received co-writing credit on the show, which received a 2016 Emmy Award nomination for Outstanding Writing for a Variety Series.

Following her involvement in the film Trainwreck, Judd Apatow approached O'Doherty about a role in the Netflix series Love. O'Doherty was cast as Bertie, the new roommate of Mickey, played by Gillian Jacobs. O'Doherty starred in all three seasons of the series, from 2016 through 2018. In 2018, O'Doherty also appeared as Amy in The Festival directed by Iain Morris.

In 2021, O'Doherty appeared in the music video for the 2020 mix of "My Sweet Lord" by George Harrison.

In 2022, O'Doherty was cast as Jillian Glopp in the Dan Goor sitcom Killing It, a character she continued for the series' second season in 2023.

== Filmography ==
=== Film ===
Claudia O'Doherty film work
| Year | Title | Role | Notes |
|---|---|---|---|
| 2014 | The Inbetweeners 2 | Airline Rep | |
| 2015 | Trainwreck | Wendy | |
| 2017 | Fun Mom Dinner | Teacher Sherry | |
| 2017 | The Circle | High Powered Circler | Uncredited |
| 2018 | The Festival | Amy | |
| 2019 | Long Shot | Wembley News Anchor #3 | |
| 2019 | Extra Ordinary | Claudia Winter | |
| 2025 | Maddie's Secret | Emily | |

=== Television ===
Claudia O'Doherty television work
| Year | Title | Role | Notes |
|---|---|---|---|
| 2012 | Problems | Claudia | 4 episodes; also writer |
| 2013 | Claudia O'Doherty Comedy Blaps | Herself | 3 episodes; also writer |
| 2015 | QI | Herself | Episode: "Long Lost" |
| 2015 | Kroll Show | Stephanie | Episode: "The Commonwealth Games" |
| 2015 | Comedy Bang! Bang! | Shandy Williams | Episode: "Lil Jon Wears a Baseball Cap and Sunglasses" |
| 2015 | Comedy Feeds | Various | Episode: "People Time" |
| 2015–2016 | Inside Amy Schumer | Various | 4 episodes; also writer |
| 2015–2018 | Drunk History | Herself | 2 episodes |
| 2016 | Animals. | April (voice) | 2 episodes |
| 2016–2017 | @midnight | Herself | Episodes: "362" & "511" |
| 2016–2018 | Love | Bertie Bauer | Main role, seasons 1–3; 29 episodes |
| 2017 | Drive Share | Jenny | Episode: "Backbiting Besties" |
| 2019 | SMILF | Winnie | Episode: "Sex Makes It Less Formal" |
| 2019 | Sarah's Channel | Sarah | 6 episodes |
| 2019 | Squinters | Rachel | 5 episodes |
| 2020 | Wild Life | Marny (voice) | 6 episodes |
| 2020, 2021 | Cake | Mrs. Haywood (voice) | 2 episodes |
| 2020–2024 | Bluey | Aunt Frisky (voice) | 3 episodes |
| 2022 | Our Flag Means Death | Mary Bonnet | 5 episodes |
| 2022 | The Strange Chores | Mia / Finn (voice) | 2 episodes |
| 2022–2023 | Killing It | Jillian Glopp | Main role, seasons 1 & 2; 18 episodes |
| 2023 | Koala Man | Various characters (voices) | Recurring role, 4 episodes |
| 2023 | Never Have I Ever | Baby | 3 episodes |
| 2023–2025 | Digman! | Australia / Symone (voice) | 2 episodes |
| 2025 | Wylde Pak | Toe (voice) | Episode: "Meats of Strength / Dead Ed's" |
| 2025 | Sunny Nights | Sophie | Episode: "Transform with Tansform" |
| 2026 | New Zealand Spy | Misty Atwood | 5 episodes |
