= The Witchfinder (TV series) =

2022 BBC comedy series

- Genre: Sitcom
- Created by: Neil Gibbons; Rob Gibbons
- Written by: Neil Gibbons; Rob Gibbons
- Directed by: Rob Gibbons; Neil Gibbons
- Starring: Tim Key; Daisy May Cooper
- Country of origin: United Kingdom
- Original language: English
- No. of series: 1
- No. of episodes: 6

Production
- Production company: Baby Cow Productions

Original release
- Network: BBC Two
- Release: 8 March – 12 April 2022

The Witchfinder is a British television sitcom created, written, and directed by the Gibbons brothers. The series is executive produced by Steve Coogan, and Christine Langan, and produced by Dave Lambert for Baby Cow Productions. It stars Tim Key and Daisy May Cooper. It was broadcast on BBC Two from 8 March 2022.

== Premise ==
Set in 1645, during the English Civil War, Cooper plays a suspected witch being escorted by Key across East Anglia for a witch trial. Key plays a failing, chauvinistic, pompous witchfinder for whom the seemingly simple journey risks becoming an ordeal.

== Cast and characters ==
- Tim Key as Gideon Bannister
- Daisy May Cooper as Thomasine Gooch
- Jessica Hynes as Old Myers
- Daniel Rigby as Hebble
- Tuwaine Barrett as Cumberlidge
- Reece Shearsmith as Matthew Hopkins
- Michael Culkin as Lord Salisbury
- Rosie Cavaliero as Mrs. Jennings
- Dan Skinner as Beekeeper
- Ricky Tomlinson as Crockett

== Production ==
The series was commissioned for BBC Two in October 2019 by channel controller Patrick Holland and Shane Allen, Controller of Comedy Commissioning. Filming ran from June to July 2021.

In 2023 the BBC cancelled the show.

== Broadcast ==
The Witchfinder was broadcast on BBC Two from 10pm on 8 March 2022.

== Reception ==
=== Accolade ===
On 9 January 2023 the show received a nomination at the Comedy.co.uk Awards 2022.

=== Critical response ===
Writing in The Guardian, Lucy Mangan awarded the show two stars, describing it as "a fertile premise, so resonant with the times", but said the story was thin, and although the actors bring as much as they can to the parts, some such as Hynes were "woefully underused" and it left "a programme whose every aspect is underbaked and doesn’t seem to know how to make best use of most of its gifts".

Sean O'Grady for The Independent awarded the show three stars, and said that the "BBC has chucked some of the very finest talents into their cauldron of comedy – but produced something mediocre".
