= Comedy Feeds =

- Genre: Comedy; Sitcom; Sketch comedy Anthology
- Country of origin: United Kingdom
- Original language: English
- No. of episodes: 38

Original release
- Network: BBC Three
- Release: 24 August 2012 – 30 November 2016

Comedy Feeds is a sitcom / sketch show featured on BBC Three since 2014. Each Comedy Feed showcases emerging new talent by making their pilot shows available exclusively on BBC iPlayer.
