= Ben Ashenden =

British-Irish actor (born 1989/90)

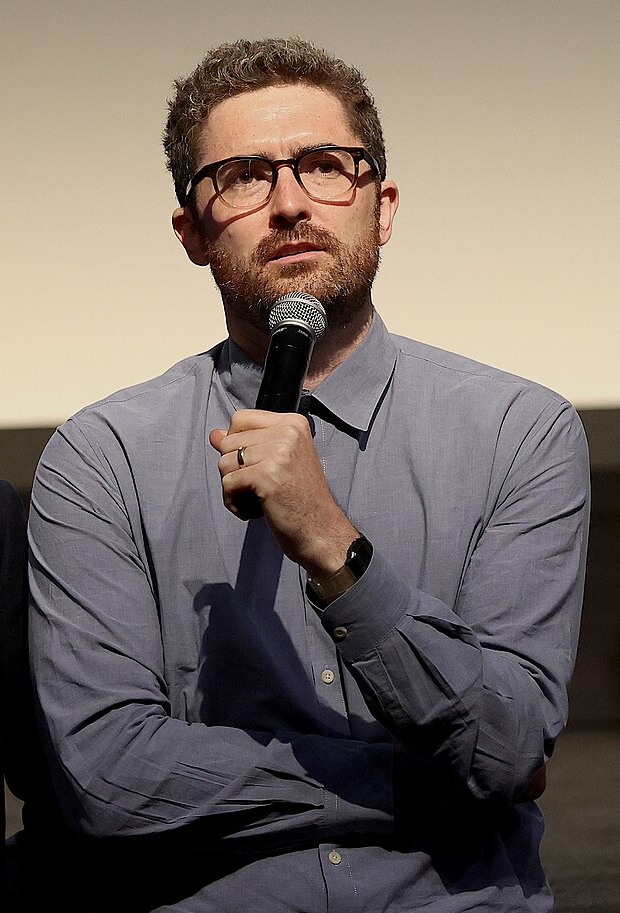
- Ashenden at Tribeca Film Festival 2025
- Born: 1989 or 1990 (age 36–37); Watford, Hertfordshire, England
- Education: University of Cambridge
- Occupations: Actor, comedian, screenwriter
- Years active: 2009–present

Ben Ashenden (born 1989 or 1990) is a British-Irish actor, comedian and screenwriter. He is half of the duo The Pin, with Alexander Owen. Together they co-wrote and starred in Deep Cover to critical acclaim. As an actor, he is best known for his appearances in Black Mirror, Stath Lets Flats and Jurassic World Dominion.

== Early life ==
Ashenden was born in 1989 or 1990 in Watford, Hertfordshire, and grew up in Radlett. His father is a builder and his mother is a bookseller. He has one sister. He went to the Haberdashers' Aske's School for Boys and performed with the Chicken Shed Theatre Company before studying English Literature at Trinity Hall, Cambridge.

== Career ==
Ashenden met his double-act colleague, Alexander Owen, at the University of Cambridge. They co-wrote/performed (with Joey Batey, Joe Bannister, Mark Fiddaman and Simon Haines) the sketch show ‘Good Clean Men’. Ashenden and Owen then performed with the Cambridge Footlights, as part of the first troupe to tour America, in a show directed by Liam Williams and Daran Johnson.

Upon graduation the pair took their sketch act, The Pin, to the Edinburgh Fringe. Their recent show from August 2018, The Pin: Backstage, was described by The Guardian as “one of Edinburgh’s most dazzling comedy shows”, and is now in development with Sonia Friedman Productions.

They made four series for BBC Radio 4, picking up nominations at the 2017 Writers' Guild Awards. and Radio Academy Awards, and winning the BBC Radio Award for Best Comedy.

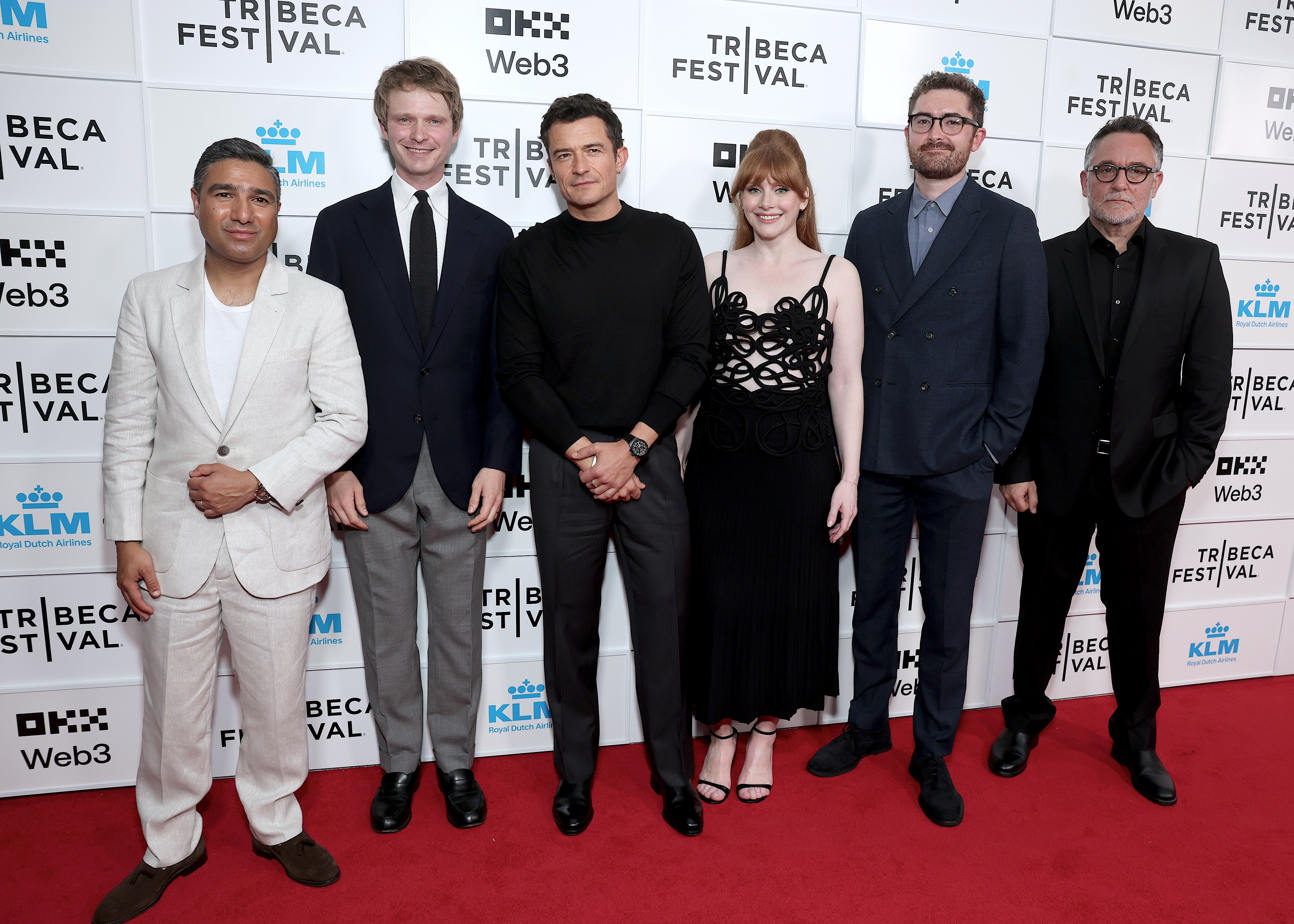
Ben Ashenden with Co-Writers Alexander Owen and Colin Trevorrow, and the cast of DEEP COVER at the International premiere, Tribeca Film Festival 2025.

As an actor, his film credits include Bridget Jones's Baby, Sulphur and White, and Horrible Histories: The Movie. His TV credits include Avenue 5 (HBO), The English Game (Netflix), W1A (BBC One), Stath Lets Flats (C4), Brotherhood (Comedy Central), Plebs (ITV2) and Sky Christmas special, Cinderella: After Ever After. In 2019 he also appeared in a Rina Sawayama music video "STFU!", playing her obnoxious date in the introductory sequence.

As a writer, he co-created the animated series Oi, Leonardo! for BBC Three, and has written for BBC One shows Walliams and Friend and Tracey Ullman's Show, BBC Three's Famalam, and Showtime’s Who is America?

In 2020 The Pin released “The Special Relationship” an 8-part series on Audible, co-starring Fred Armisen, Cecily Strong, Jamie Demetriou, Lolly Adefope and Kate Berlant. It largely repurposes sketches from their Radio 4 show within the context of a fictionalised attempt to break into the New York comedy scene.

In early 2025, he featured in Black Mirror, episode 2, season 7: "Bête Noire".

In 2025 it was announced by the BBC that he and Alexander Owen had been commissioned to write Bill's Included, a BBC One sitcom series starring Rob Brydon, with Babycow productions producing.

In September 2025, it was announced that Ashenden would portray DC Ethan Cole in the second series of BBC detective series Ludwig.

== Filmography ==
=== Film ===
Year	Film	Role	Notes
2014	Morning Has Broken	Waiter	TV film
2016	Bridget Jones's Baby	Pierce	
2019	Horrible Histories: The Movie – Rotten Romans	Messenger	
2019	After Ever After	Pongo	TV film
2020	Sulphur and White	Sean	
2022	The Bubble	Tip, the MoCap Guy	
2022	Jurassic World Dominion	Tyler	
2022	What's Love Got to Do with It?	Sam	
2024	Seize Them!	Penda the rebel	
2025	Deep Cover	DI Dawes	
2026	Wicker	The Baker	
2027	The Entertainment System Is Down	Edward Morrison	Upcoming role

=== Television ===
Year	Title	Role	Notes
2013	BBC Comedy Feeds		Episode: "Kerry"
2014	Siblings	Michael	Episode: "Balcombe's Funeral"
2015	Drunk History	Drunk Storyteller	Episode: "The Krays/Guy Fawkes"
2015	Brotherhood	Dan	Series regular
2016	Halloween Comedy Shorts	Nick	Episode: "Jamie Demetriou's Horror: Oh God"
2016	Crazyhead	Luke	Episode: "Penguin or Cow?"
2016-17	Witless	PC Colin Naysmith	2 episodes
2017	Henry IX	Damian	3 episodes
2017	Coconut	James	4 episodes
2017	W1A	Assistant Floor Manager	1 episode
2017-18	Tracey Breaks the News	Various	3 episodes
2017-18	Tracey Ullman's Show	Various	Series regular
2018	Oi Leonardo	Various	Mini-series
2018	Sick Note	Officer Errol	Episode: "Operation Thunderbolt"
2018-19	Stath Lets Flats	Tristan	2 episodes
2019	Plebs	Posh Man	Episode: "The New Flat"
2020	Avenue 5	Rick	2 episodes
2020	The English Game	Cattermole	1 episode
2021	Breeders	Teaching Assistant	Episode: "No Surrender"
2021	Petrichor	Stuart	1 episode
2021-23	Ghosts	Captain of the Guards	2 episodes
2022	Deep Heat	Mike	Episode: "The 'Tour'"
2022	Ten Percent	Estate Agent	1 episode
2022	Ellie & Natasia	Various	3 episodes
2022	1899	Darrel	3 episodes
2023	A Whole Lifetime with Jamie Demetriou	Fred	TV special
2023	Intelligence	Chris Dibbs	Episode: "A Special Agent Special"
2023	Hijack	Adam	Recurring role; 5 episodes
2025	Black Mirror	Nick	Episode: "Bête Noire"
2025	Here We Go		writer of 1 episode
2026	Ludwig	DC Ethan Cole	Series regular; 6 episodes

=== Stage ===
Year	Title	Role	Venue	Notes
2009	Wind in the Willows	Badger	Gilded Balloon, Edinburgh	as part of Edinburgh Festival Fringe
2009	Good Clean Men	Writer/Performer/Director	Corpus Playroom, Cambridge	
2009	Barry! Pull Your Finger Out!	Hugo	udderBELLY, Edinburgh	as part of Edinburgh Festival Fringe
2009	Ali Baba and the Forty Thieves	Amara	ADC Theatre, Cambridge	
2010	Armageddapocalypse 2: The Explosioning	Performer	ADC Theatre, Cambridge	
2010	The Oxford Revue and Friends	Writer/Performer	Oxford Arts Theatre, Oxford	
2010	Romeo and Juliet	Gregory	Cambridge Arts Theatre, Cambridge	
2010	Cambridge Comedy Fest	Writer/Performer	Cambridge Arts Theatre, Cambridge	
2010	Good for You	Writer/Performer	International Tour	with Cambridge Footlights
2010	The Pin	Writer/Performer/Director	ADC Theatre, Cambridge	
2011	Pretty Little Panic	Writer/Performer	International Tour	with Cambridge Footlights
2015	Ten Seconds with the Pin	Writer/Performer/Director	Pleasance Dome, Edinburgh	as part of Edinburgh Festival Fringe
2020	The Comeback	Writer/Performer	Noël Coward Theatre	

== Awards and nominations ==
Year	Award	Category	Work	Result	Ref.
2009	Footlights Harry Porter Award		Barry! Pull Your Finger Out!	Won	
2013	London Sketchfest Prize	Best New Act	The Pin	Won	
2016	Audio and Radio Industry Awards	Best Entertainment Production	The Pin	Nominated	
2016	BBC Radio Awards	Best Comedy Production or Moment	The Pin	Won	
2017	BBC Audio Drama Awards	Best Comedy With a Live Audience	The Pin	Nominated	
2017	Writers' Guild Awards	Best Radio Comedy	The Pin	Nominated	
