= Al Roberts (comedian) =

English comedian and actor

Alastair Roberts is an English comedian and actor. He is part of the comedy trio Sheeps with Daran Johnson and Liam Williams. He is known for his TV roles including as Al in Stath Lets Flats (2018–23) and Elder Abijah in Everyone Else Burns (2023–24). In 2026, he became part of the writing team for the UK version of Saturday Night Live.

== Early life and education ==
Roberts attended the University of Cambridge from 2006 to 2009. He was part of the Footlights, alongside future collaborator Liam Williams and Daran Johnson. He was Membership Secretary from 2006 to 2007, a General Member of the committee from 2007 to 2008, and President from 2008 to 2009. He played in the Footlights 125th anniversary tour show Devils (alongside Johnson) in 2008 and the 2009 tour show Wishful Thinking (alongside Johnson and Williams). Devils received a three-star review from The Skinny, who described Roberts' performance as "hilariously mannered and beautifully timed".

== Career ==
=== Sheeps ===
Roberts is part of comedy trio Sheeps, with Daran Johnson and Liam Williams. They have played shows at the Edinburgh Fringe Festival in 2011, 2012, 2014, 2015, 2018, 2024, and 2025.

In 2024, Sheeps released a Christmas album: A Very Sheeps Christmas. It was made over ten years, and featured 20 original tracks. They performed the album at their 2025 Edinburgh Fringe show.

=== Television ===
In 2015, Roberts starred in BBC Two comedy sketch show The Javone Prince Show.

In 2015, Roberts participated in the Comedy Feed sketch show pilot, People Time, for BBC Three alongside Daran Johnson, Natasia Demetriou, Claudia O'Doherty, Ellie White and Liam Williams (who had first met at the Edinburgh Fringe in 2010). The Guardian urged the BBC to make a series, saying "The material on display here makes me suddenly and unexpectedly excited for the future of the sketch show...they make each subject new and weird, yet accessible and silly." Chortle described it as "this decade's Big Train" and that "If it can find it's [sic] way onto the telly, People Time would be a near-guaranteed cult hit." Comedian Adam Buxton said that it was the "best comedy thing I’ve seen in a long while". Despite its good reviews, it did not get commissioned. Continuing with the cast (minus O'Doherty), he co-created the web series 2016: Year Friends. Each episode was written by a different member of the troupe. The premise of the series is that a group of friends get together and make some new year's resolutions, and they also find out that Al is dying and Tash is pregnant. The show is influenced by British mockumentaries including The Office and That Peter Kay Thing, as well as the nascent reality TV genre.

From 2018 to 2023, Roberts starred as Al in Stath Lets Flats. Jamie Demetriou, who co-wrote the show with Robert Popper, wrote the part for Al, after seeing him perform with Sheeps.

In 2019, Roberts starred in one of Channel 4's Comedy Blaps, Sam Campbell: Get Real Dude. Produced by Blink Industries, it combined a mix of puppetry, 2D and 3D animation. Roberts starred alongside Sam Campbell, Jamie Demetriou, David O'Doherty, Charlotte Ritchie, Neil Edmond, Tanya Moodie, Rob Carter, Arnab Chanda, Shivani Thussu, Terry Bird, Carole Street, Mark Silcox and Aaron Chen.

In 2026, Roberts became part of the writers of the UK edition of Saturday Night Live.

== Reception ==
Comedian Abi Tedder cites Roberts as an influence and "probably the funniest man I've ever seen on a stage".

== Personal life ==
Sheeps lived together for a period of time. Roberts is married to actress and comedian Emma Sidi, also his on-screen partner in the TV series Starstruck.

== Filmography ==
=== Film ===
Year	Title	Role	Notes	Ref.
2014	Intervention	Will	Short film	
2014	The Bird	Son	Short film	
2016	Three Women Wait for Death	Solicitor	Short film	
2021	Last Night in Soho	Librarian		
2024	And Mrs.	Daniel		

=== Television ===
Year	Title	Channel	Role	Other role	Notes	Ref.
2014	Live at the Electric	BBC Three	Himself		Series 3, Episode 1	
2014	Parents' Evening	BBC Three	Mr Wilson		Pilot	
2015	The Javone Prince Show	BBC Two	Ensemble actor		Episodes 1–4	
2015	Comedy Feeds: People Time	BBC Three	Various	Writer	Pilot	
2016	Siblings	BBC Three	Ralph		Series 2, Episode 2: "Golden Aunt"	
2016	Flowers	Channel 4	Tree Man		Series 1, Episode 6	
2016	Comedy Feeds: Limbo	BBC Three	Francis		Pilot	
2016	Morgana Robinson's The Agency	BBC Two	Journalist		Episode 3	
2016	Drifters	Channel 4	Will Johnson		Series 4, Episode 4: "Homeless"	
2016	2016: Year Friends	Vimeo	Al		12 episodes	
2017	The Windsors	Channel 4	Richard III		Series 2, Episode 3	
2018–2023	Stath Lets Flats	Channel 4	Al		Series 1–3	
2019	Sam Campbell: Get Real Dude	Channel 4	Ensemble actor		Pilot (Comedy Blap)	
2019	Down from London	Vimeo	Martin		1 episode	
2020–2021	Feel Good	Channel 4	Jared		Series 1, Episodes 1, 3, 6; Series 2, Episode 3	
2020–2021	King Gary	BBC One	Robin		Series 1, Episode 3: "The Bunion"; Episode 4 "The Big Schmooze" Series 2, Episode 3: "Conquerors"; Episode 4: "Fully Dark"	
2020	Red Dwarf - The Promised Land	BBC Two	Count Ludo			
2020	Ghosts	BBC One	Francis		Series 2, Episode 4: "The Thomas Thorne Affair"	
2020	Truth Seekers	Amazon Prime	Young Byron, Berkeley		Episode 2: "The Watcher On The Water"	
2021	Dead Pixels	E4	DVT		Series 2, Episode 3: "Mission"; Episode 6: "Flanks/Yams"	
2021	Intelligence	Sky One	Pavarotti		Series 2, Episode 3	
2021–2023	Starstruck	BBC Three	Ian		Series 1, Episode 1: "NYE"; Episode 3: "Summer"; Episode 6: "Christmas". Series 2, Episodes 1–6. Series 3, Episodes 1, 2, 4, 5, 6.	
2022	This Is Going To Hurt	BBC One	James		Episode 7	
2022	What We Do in the Shadows		Freddie		Series 4, Episode 2: "The Lamp", Episode 9: "Freddie"	
2023–2024	Everyone Else Burns	Channel 4	Elder Abijah		Series 1 and 2	
2023	A Whole Lifetime With Jamie Demetriou	Netflix	Sigmund the City Boy		One episode	
2023	Man Like Mobeen	BBC	Memory Stick		4 episodes	
2024	Industry	BBC	Nicholas St John		1 episode	
2025	Mammoth	BBC Two	Matthew		Series 2, Episode 2	
2025	Chess Ham		Spy			
2026	Saturday Night Live UK	Sky One		Writer		
2026	Ann Droid	BBC	Mark		3 episodes	

=== Radio ===
Year	Title	Station	Role	Other role	Notes	Ref.
2013	Sketchorama	BBC Radio 4	As "Sheeps"	Writer	Series 2, Episode 2	
2014	Newsjack	BBC Radio 4		Writer	Series 11, Episodes 2, 4	
2014	Newsjack	BBC Radio 4		Script Editor	Series 11, Episode 3	
2015	Sabotage	BBC Radio 4 Extra	As "Sheeps"		Series 2, Episode 2	
2017	Liam Williams – Ladhood	BBC Radio 4	Ensemble actor		Series 2	
2025	DMs Are Open	BBC Radio 4	Ensemble actor		Series 4, Episodes 1–6	
2025	Kat Sadler's Screen Time	BBC Radio 4	Ensemble actor		Series 2, Episodes 1–4	

=== Live performance ===
Year	Title	Role	Group	Venue	Festival	Ref.
2006	Much Ado About Nothing	Dogberry, a Constable	Footlights	ADC Theatre		
2006	Circus	Various	Footlights	ADC Theatre		
2006	The Alchemist	Subtle	Footlights	ADC Theatre		
2006	Grow Up	Various	Footlights	ADC Theatre		
2006	Faust: ADC/Footlights Panto 2006 – Cornelius	Cornelius	Footlights	ADC Theatre		
2007	I'll Be Back Before Midnight	Arthur	Footlights	ADC Theatre		
2007	The Comedy of Errors	Antipholus of Ephesus	Footlights	Queens College		
2007	Coat	The Man	Footlights	White Belly, Underbelly	Edinburgh Fringe Festival	
2007	Motortown	Paul	Footlights	ADC Theatre		
2007	Once Upon a Time... The 2007 ADC/ Footlights Panto	Enjolras	Footlights	ADC Theatre		
2008	Romeo and Juliet	Romeo	Footlights	ADC Theatre		
2008	Devils: Footlights 125th Anniversary Tour Show	Writer, Performer	Footlights	Pembroke New Cellars		
2008	Devils: Footlights 125th Anniversary Tour Show	Writer, Performer	Footlights	ADC Theatre		
2008	Devils: Footlights 125th Anniversary Tour Show	Writer, Performer	Footlights	Underbelly	Edinburgh Fringe Festival	
2008	Theseus and the Minotaur: ADC/Footlights Panto 2008	King Minos	Footlights	ADC Theatre		
2009	An Oak Tree	Father	Footlights	ADC Theatre		
2009	Footlights Tour Show 2009 - Wishful Thinking	Writer, Performer	Footlights	ADC Theatre		
2009	Footlights Tour Show 2009 - Wishful Thinking	Writer, Performer	Footlights	Etcetera Theatre		
2009	Footlights Tour Show 2009 - Wishful Thinking	Writer, Performer	Footlights	Canal Cafe		
2009	Footlights Tour Show 2009 - Wishful Thinking	Writer, Performer	Footlights	Pleasance	Edinburgh Fringe Festival	
2009	Footlights Tour Show 2009 - Wishful Thinking	Writer, Performer	Footlights	West Walls Theatre		
2009	Footlights Tour Show 2009 - Wishful Thinking	Writer, Performer	Footlights	Royal Northern College of Music		
2009	Footlights Tour Show 2009 - Wishful Thinking	Writer, Performer	Footlights	Nottingham Arts Theatre		
2009	Footlights Tour Show 2009 - Wishful Thinking	Writer, Performer	Footlights	Old Fire Station		
2009	Footlights Tour Show 2009 - Wishful Thinking	Writer, Performer	Footlights	Royal Naval College		
2009	Footlights Tour Show 2009 - Wishful Thinking	Writer, Performer	Footlights	Tivoli Theatre, Dorset		
2009	Footlights Tour Show 2009 - Wishful Thinking	Writer, Performer	Footlights	Torch Theatre		
2009	Footlights Tour Show 2009 - Wishful Thinking	Writer, Performer	Footlights	Gulbenkian Theatre		
2009	Footlights Tour Show 2009 - Wishful Thinking	Writer, Performer	Footlights	New Cut Arts		
2009	Footlights Tour Show 2009 - Wishful Thinking	Writer, Performer	Footlights	Arena Theatre		
2009	Footlights Tour Show 2009 - Wishful Thinking	Writer, Performer	Footlights	Uppingham Theatre		
2010	Sheeps and You Have Sixty Minutes		Sheeps	ADC Theatre		
2011	Sheeps: A Sketch Show		Sheeps	Pleasance Courtyard	Edinburgh Fringe Festival	
2012	Armageddapocalypse: Threat Level Dead		James Moran, Lucien Young, Mark Fiddaman	Udderbelly	Edinburgh Fringe Festival	
2012	Sheeps - Dancing With Lisa		Sheeps	Pleasance Courtyard	Edinburgh Fringe Festival	
2014	Sheeps: Wembley Previews		Sheeps	Bedlam Theatre	Edinburgh Fringe Festival	
2015	Sheeps Skewer the News		Sheeps	The Cellar Monkey	Edinburgh Fringe Festival	
2018	Sheeps: Live and Loud Selfie Sex Harry Potter		Sheeps	Pleasance Dome	Edinburgh Fringe Festival	
2021			Sheeps		Aberystwyth Comedy Festival	
2021	King of the Table		Sheeps	Moth Club		
2024	Sheeps: The Giggle Bunch (That's Our Name For You)		Sheeps	Pleasance Courtyard	Edinburgh Fringe Festival	
2025`	Sheeps: A Very Sheeps Christmas? Live in Concert! In the Summer!		Sheeps	Pleasance Courtyard	Edinburgh Fringe Festival	
