= Sheeps (comedy sketch group) =

British comedy sketch group

Sheeps is a British comedy sketch group made up of Liam Williams, Al Roberts and Daran Johnson.

== Background ==
Williams, Roberts and Johnson met at the University of Cambridge, as they were all part of the Footlights. They performed together several times as part of the group, before devising Sheeps.

== Shows ==
One of their early reviews from The Tab (of their show at ADC Theatre) was very mixed, saying that "It was an alright show...but it didn’t sparkle as each of these boys can on their own", yet "it was funny...the sort of comedy Footlights is best at: hilarious, spontaneous banter between half a dozen genuinely funny people" Varsity gave the show four stars, saying that, whilst sketch shows are always mixed "when it did hit the mark, Sheeps was warm, playful and frankly bloody hysterical."

In 2011, Sheeps took their first show to the Edinburgh Fringe Festival, with the support of the Footlights and The Old Vic. They performed a show of sketches, including performances of show tunes. Three Weeks, giving a four-star review, said that "Some of the scenes are hilarious, all of them are original and each of the three comics are blissfully talented. Although there are some parts that need polishing or abandoning, it is easy to see these three going far." The Independent also gave them four stars, describing the show as "something quite different and very exciting indeed." The Guardian gave them a mixed review, describing them as "a winning combination of personalities and evident comic talent, who have yet to discover what sets them apart from their sketch-troupe peers." British Comedy Guide also gave it a mixed review, giving it three stars, saying that some of the sketches were "really funny and brilliantly performed" and written by "clearly talented writers", whilst others were safe and conventional.

In 2012, Sheeps took their show Dancing With Lisa to the Fringe. The Skinny gave the show three stars, describing it as "impressively structured" with "fairly strong" writing, but could benefit from taking more risks. Three Weeks only gave the show one star, describing it as smug and overrated.

In 2014, Sheeps took their show Wembley Previews to the Edinburgh Fringe, at Bedlam Theatre. The show is intended as previews for a larger show at Wembley Stadium, and the trio re-work and re-perform their supposed opening sketch in multiple ways. The sketch is set in an aquarium, with Roberts playing a jellyfish. The Guardian gave the show four stars, describing it as "clever, arch and multi-layered".

In 2015, Sheeps took their show Sheep Skewer the News to the Edinburgh Fringe.

== Performance history ==
Year	Title	Venue	Festival	Ref.
2010	Sheeps and You Have Sixty Minutes	ADC Theatre		
2011	Sheeps: A Sketch Show	Pleasance Courtyard	Edinburgh Fringe Festival	
2012	Sheeps - Dancing With Lisa	Pleasance Courtyard	Edinburgh Fringe Festival	
2014	Sheeps: Wembley Previews	Bedlam Theatre	Edinburgh Fringe Festival	
2015	Sheeps Skewer the News	The Cellar Monkey	Edinburgh Fringe Festival	
2018	Sheeps: Live and Loud Selfie Sex Harry Potter	Pleasance Dome	Edinburgh Fringe Festival	
2021			Aberystwyth Comedy Festival	
2024	Sheeps: The Giggle Bunch (That's Our Name For You)	Pleasance Courtyard	Edinburgh Fringe Festival	
2025`	Sheeps: A Very Sheeps Christmas? Live in Concert! In the Summer!	Pleasance Courtyard	Edinburgh Fringe Festival	
