= Pembroke Players =

Student drama society at the Cambridge University

Pembroke Players (formerly Pembroke College Players) is an amateur theatrical society in Cambridge, England, founded in 1955 and run by the students of Pembroke College, Cambridge. It is the most active College drama society in the university, staging or producing over 25 drama productions and comedy smokers every year. It is also the only College drama society to run its own international tours. During its lifetime it has been the starting point for many prominent actors and comedians, such as Clive James, Peter Cook and Eric Idle, and more recently Tom Hiddleston, Jonny Sweet and Joe Thomas. The Society celebrated its 60th birthday in 2015.

== History ==
=== The early days ===
Pembroke Players was founded in the autumn of 1955 in Room F3, next to the chapel bike racks. In addition to theatre, the underlying purpose of the society was to enable students at the then all-male college to meet ladies from across the university, and accordingly the first meeting was attended by 5 Pembroke men and 48 assorted New Hallers, Girtonians and Newnhamites. (This first meeting subsequently culminated in several marriages.) The first theatre production, Ring Round the Moon by Christopher Fry after Jean Anouilh, took place in snow-struck Blinco Grove in February 1956. (College guarantee £50, bill for damage to hall £18.) The history of the society has also been documented in Pembroke In Our Time (2007, Third Millennium Press).

Pembroke Players also has many distinguished alumni. Recordings survive from early productions and Smokers in the 1950s and 1960s featuring original material written and performed by, inter alia, Peter Cook, Tim Brooke-Taylor, Bill Oddie, John Cleese, Eric Idle, Germaine Greer, Clive James, and Jonathan Lynn. Pembroke Smokers were also the first meeting place for some of the Monty Python group. Innovation was not limited to the performances either; a poster from a 1970 production features one of the earliest examples of computer generated ASCII art in advertising.

==== Notable alumni ====
- Robert Bathurst
- Tim Brooke-Taylor
- Peter Cook
- Germaine Greer
- Tom Hiddleston
- Eric Idle
- Clive James
- David Hugh Mellor
- Bill Oddie
- Bert Parnaby
- Michael Rowan-Robinson
- John Sulston
- Jonny Sweet
- Joe Thomas
- Yorick Wilks

=== Today ===
Whilst a term's worth of shows constituted one or two productions and involved a dozen or so people back in 1955, 60 years later the story is much different. The society now holds up to 9 theatre and comedy shows per term (in the college's studio theatre), alongside producing up to three shows in other venues across Cambridge. In addition, they produce an annual College Pantomime written and starring freshers, multiple shows at the Edinburgh Festival Fringe, and the Pembroke Players Japan Tour. Pembroke Players also hosts a yearly Black Tie Smoker in the tradition of the '50s and '60s Smoking Concerts, with performances from both college and Footlights regulars, and several less formal smokers throughout the year.

== Pembroke New Cellars ==
Pembroke New Cellars, the home of the Players, is a small studio theatre situated in the basement of Foundress Court in Pembroke College. It was completed in 1997 and now stages up to 9 shows a term, as well as comedy smokers and poetry events. New Cellars is a 'black box' space, and remains one of the most versatile student theatres in Cambridge. It offers an intimate setting with maximum flexibility for staging plays 'conventionally', in traverse, or in the round; with performers on the same level as the audience or raised on staging blocks; with seats in an L-shape or one three sides of the stage. Once New Cellars was even transformed into a restaurant for a week, complete with tables for the audiences to sit at while they watched the drama unfold around them. The New Cellars seats 70-90 people.

== International tours ==
=== Pembroke Players German Tour (1957 - 1970, 2005) ===
The first Tour of West Germany took place in the summer of 1957, after one of the founders of the Society became the unintended recipient of a letter addressed to the Cambridge Mummers, inviting them to record Hamlet for German radio. Following a little moonlighting the Pembroke Players secured the tour for themselves instead, playing at venues in Bielefeld, Essen, Düsseldorf and Cologne. The tour was recorded in its entirety for Nord West Deustche Rundfunk and was conducted under the auspices of 'Die Bruecke', a spin-off of the British Council.

Many other tours have been run since; the most recent being The Importance of Being Earnest by Oscar Wilde in 2005. However, the German Tour was superseded by the Pembroke Players Japan Tour from 2007.

=== Pembroke Players Japan Tour (2007 - 2016) ===
The Pembroke Players Japan Tour was conceived by a small group of Pembroke students in 2006 and spun off from the main committee as a separate body. It was launched with a vision of youth exchange via a modern, accessible Shakespeare production and accompanying workshops. The tours build upon Pembroke's long historical links with Japanese institutions. The society has enjoyed the patronage of the Daiwa Anglo-Japanese Foundation and the GB Sasakawa Foundation since its inception.

==== PPJT 2007 ====
The inaugural tour of Romeo and Juliet staged five performances in Japan, visiting Tokyo, Wakayama and Kochi. It also held UK performances at the Embassy of Japan and the Barrandov Opera in Needham Market. Press and public reaction was highly favourable.

==== PPJT 2008 ====
The Midsummer Night's Dream tour (directed by James Lewis) expanded in September 2008 under the auspices of the British Council's UK-Japan 2008 project, with nine performances at universities across Japan. UK productions were held in King's College Chapel, Cambridge and the Greenwood Theatre, London. The tour was also offered a BBC weblog which it maintained in conjunction with its first Japanese language blog. It was directed by James Lewis.

==== PPJT 2009 ====
The Tempest (directed by Oscar Toeman) was the chosen production of the PPJT tour this year, with the company performing in Tokyo, Nagoya and Yokohama. The production, unlike previous years, was a pre-existing show, directed by Oscar Toeman, and which had previously played at the ADC Theatre, Cambridge, receiving critical acclaim and sellout crowds. The 2009 tour was supported by the Japan-British Society.

==== PPJT 2010 ====
The fourth tour staged seven performances of Much Ado About Nothing (directed by Alice Malin) at venues in Tokyo, Yokohama, Kochi and Tateshina-Kougen. UK performances took place at Ely Cathedral and Pembroke House in Walworth, along with an October home-run in the Howard Theatre, Downing College, Cambridge.

==== PPJT 2011 ====
The fifth anniversary tour took a production of Twelfth Night (directed by Chloe Mashiter) to Japan in summer 2011, with a preview performance at Ely Cathedral followed by shows in Yokohama, Yoyogi, Ochanomizu and Kichijoji. The final show at Seikei University on 1 October formed part of the university's 100th anniversary celebrations and was attended by an audience of over 600. Typhoon Roke caused problems for the group with two actors trapped on a bullet train for 11 hours near Nagoya.

==== PPJT 2012 ====
The sixth tour returned to Japan with a production of Macbeth (directed by Tom Adams), set in Edwardian Britain. The Players spent a week with principle sponsors, Seikei University, along with shows and workshops at Meiji University, Daito Bunka University and two international schools. In addition, the Players performed two sell-out public performances at Nigiwai-za in Yokohama and led workshops at the Kanto Plains Drama Festival. Four pre-tour performances were held at Ely Cathedral and the Round Church in Cambridge, followed by a post-tour home run at the Corpus Playroom.

==== PPJT 2013 ====
The seventh annual Japan Tour was a gender-reversed production of The Two Gentlemen of Verona (directed by Charlie Risius). The play was performed in Ely Cathedral and the Round Church, Cambridge, before playing to seven venues in Japan. The tour finished with a week-long home run in the Corpus Playroom in October.

==== PPJT 2014 ====
The eighth inauguration of the Pembroke Players Japan Tour was The Merchant of Venice (directed by Emma Wilkinson) in 2014.

==== PPJT 2015 ====
The ninth Japan Tour was The Comedy of Errors (directed by Atri Banerjee), and toured to Okinawa and Tokyo in September and October.

==== PPJT 2016 ====
The final Japan Tour was Romeo and Juliet (directed by George Kan), toured to Tokyo and Okinawa in September and October, beginning with a performance at a ten-year reunion event at the Embassy of Japan in London, accompanied by a small exhibition of the tour's history. Cast members included Emma Corrin playing Juliet, and Lola Olufemi playing Lady Montague.

From 2017 to 2019, the Tour was superseded by the Cambridge University Asia Theatre Tour (CUATT), which changed focus from Shakespeare to modern British authors. However, all tours were brought to an end by the coronavirus pandemic in 2020.

=== Pembroke Players China Tour (2012) ===
In July 2012, Pembroke Players performed a short run of Much Ado About Nothing (directed by Holly Maguire) at the Haidian Theatre, Beijing. The cast and crew were composed entirely of students of Pembroke College.

=== Edinburgh Fringe Festival ===
The Society has a history of sending shows to the Edinburgh Fringe Festival each year.

- 2015 - Pelican (Just the Tonic), Bafflesmash (Laughing Horse), war war brand war (Paradise)
- 2014 - Penelopiad (C Venues), Occupied (Greenside), UCAS! The Musical (Greenside)
- 2013 - Snap Out of It!, Chaucer All Strung Up (C Nova)
- 2012 - Bereavement The Musical (C Main, with CUADC and CUMTS)

== See also ==
- ADC Theatre
- CUADC
- Marlowe Society
