= The Pin =

The Pin may refer to:

- The Pin (comedy act), a comedy double-act with their own BBC Radio 4 show
- A song from the Goo Goo Dolls' album Boxes
