= List of BBC Heads of Light Entertainment =

The following is a list of the television and radio Heads of Light Entertainment of the British Broadcasting Corporation.

== Head of Light Entertainment (1948–20??) ==
#	Name	Tenure	Ref.
1	Pat Hilyard	1948–1952	
2	Ronnie Waldman	1952–1958	
3	Eric Maschwitz	1958–1961	
4	Tom Sloan	1961–1970	
5	Bill Cotton	1970–1977	
6	James Gilbert	1977–1982	
7	John Howard Davies	1982–1985	
(?)			
(?)	Jim Moir	1987–1993	
(?)	Michael Leggo	1994–1999	
(?)	David Young	1999–2001	
(?)	Jonathan Glazier	2001 (Note: Temporary role.)	
(?)	Wayne Garvie	2001–2005	

== Head of Radio Light Entertainment (1933–20??) ==
Before the start of Roy Rich's tenure, the members were known as the Heads of Variety.

#	Name	Tenure	Ref.
1	Eric Maschwitz	1933–1937	
2	John Watt	1937–1945	
3	Michael Standing	1945–1952	
4	Pat Hilyard	1952–1964	
5	Roy Rich	1964–1967	
6	Con Mahoney	1967–1978	
7	David Hatch	1978–1980	
8	Bobby Jaye	1981–1985	
9	Martin Fisher	1985–	
(?)	Jonathan James-Moore	1991–1999	
(?)			
(?)	Paul Schlesinger	c. 2006	
