= The Marlowe Society =

Cambridge University theatre club

The Marlowe Society is a Cambridge University theatre club for Cambridge students. It is dedicated to achieving a high standard of student drama at Cambridge. The society celebrated its centenary over three years (2007–2009) and in 2008 there was a production by the society of a version of Comus written by Australian poet and playwright John Kinsella.

== History ==
The Marlowe Society was founded in 1907 by Rupert Brooke and other students, with the intention of performing historical plays that were relatively unknown, as Christopher Marlowe, the Society's namesake, was himself a lesser-known contemporary of Shakespeare's. Brooke and his fellow students were reacting against Victorian theatre and decided to revive the presentation of Shakespeare in Cambridge, not performed there since 1886. The Society came to specialise in Elizabethan and Jacobean revivals in uncut texts performed with their original economy and rapidity, and (in the early years) with the female roles played by men. The first successful modern production of The White Devil, for example, was that of the Marlowe Society (ADC Theatre, Cambridge, March 1920), directed by J. T. Sheppard, with music by C. Armstrong Gibbs and with Eric Maschwitz as Vittoria. “Anybody who enjoys hearing beautiful poetry beautifully spoken,” wrote the editor of the Cambridge Review, “and tragic passion ‘with dignity put on’ should not miss this wonderful opportunity. What a magnificent play!”

In August and September 1948, the Society participated in a Foreign Office tour to the ruins of Berlin, as part of a soft power bid to move hearts and minds during the Berlin Blockade. During this Elizabethan Festival, they performed Measure for Measure and The White Devil. Students participating were also involved in gathering intelligence.

Between 1958 and 1964, to celebrate the Centennial of 1964 as commissioned by the British Council, the Society staged productions of the complete, uncut canon of Shakespeare poems and plays, under the direction of George Rylands.

The Marlowe Society and Footlights used to work closely together: frequently the annual Footlights pantomime was a parody of the Marlowe Society's serious dramatic performance earlier in the year. This performance is the one 'hosted' by the Cambridge Arts Theatre in Cambridge.

In October 2013, the Marlowe Society held a year-long festival to mark the 450th Anniversary of Marlowe's birth. Over the year, the entirety of Marlowe's works was staged in venues across Cambridge, including the annual 'Arts' Show. The Festival was launched by Michael Oakley's production of Dido, Queen of Carthage at Emmanuel College Chapel, followed by a gala performance at the Senate House.

In 2020, the Marlowe Society presented Othello at the Cambridge Arts Theatre, directed by John Haidar.

== Notable figures ==
There are many famous alumni of this society, including:

- Rupert Brooke
- John Barton
- Sir Peter Hall
- Sir Trevor Nunn
- Trevor Bowen
- Tim Supple
- Sir Sam Mendes
- Tony Palmer
- Sir Ian McKellen
- Sir Derek Jacobi
- Tom Hollander
- Griff Rhys Jones
- Clive Swift
- George 'Dadie' Rylands
- Sir Simon Russell Beale
- Dame Emma Thompson
- Sir Stephen Fry
- Hugh Laurie
- Tom Hiddleston
- Rachel Weisz
- James Norton
- Dan Stevens
- Rebecca Hall
- Emma Corrin
- D. Keith Mano
- Bilal Hasna

Alumni have often returned to participate in current Marlowe productions: including Sir Ian McKellen, who supported the 2010 production of Ben Jonson's The Alchemist, and Sir Trevor Nunn, who directed the 2007 production of Shakespeare's Cymbeline.

== See also ==
- Cambridge University Amateur Dramatic Club
- ADC Theatre
- Oxford University Dramatic Society
