= The Comeback (play) =

Play by Ben Ashenden and Alexander Owen

- Written by: Ben Ashenden; Alexander Owen
- Genre: Comedy

Premiere
- Date: 8 December 2020
- Place: Noël Coward Theatre, London

The Comeback is a comedy play by Ben Ashenden and Alexander Owen (also known as the comedy double-act The Pin).

== Production history ==
=== London (2020–21) ===
The play premiered at the Noël Coward Theatre in London's West End on 8 December 2020 (whilst the theatre's resident show Dear Evan Hansen was on hiatus due to the COVID-19 pandemic). The play stars Ashenden and Owen, is directed by Emily Burns and produced by Sonia Friedman Productions.

The play was scheduled to run until 3 January 2021 to a socially distant audience, however due to the Government's announcement of the restrictions the play closed on 15 December. The play reopened on 10 July and ran until 25 July 2021.

The playtext was published by Nick Hern Books on 17 December 2020.

==== Special guest stars ====
Each performance contains an appearance from a special guest star. Guests during the London run included Simon Bird, Rob Brydon, Ian McKellen, Joanna Lumley, Danny Dyer, Graham Norton, Ore Oduba, Katherine Parkinson, Clare Balding, David Walliams and Matt Lucas, Toby Jones, Claudia Winkleman, Jayde Adams, Ruby Wax, David Baddiel, Nicola Roberts, Steve Pemberton, Sandi Toksvig, Sanjeev Bhaskar, Bonnie Langford, Nish Kumar, Sophie Ellis-Bextor, Ant & Dec, Beverley Knight, Patricia Hodge, Monica Dolan, Phil Wang and Martin Freeman.

== Reception ==
The play was met to critical acclaim and a string of four and five star reviews.
