= Brotherhood (British TV series) =

- Genre: Sitcom
- Created by: Patrick Carr; Paul Mckenna
- Written by: Patrick Carr; Paul McKenna; Andrew Dawson; Steve Dawson; Tim Inman
- Directed by: Dominic Brigstocke; Martin Dennis
- Starring: Ben Ashenden; Johnny Flynn; Scott Folan; Gemma Chan; Ellie Taylor; Sarah Hadland
- Composer: Oli Julian
- Country of origin: United Kingdom
- Original language: English

Production
- Executive producers: Kenton Allen; Lourdes Diaz; Matthew Justice; Caroline Leddy; Jill Offman
- Producer: Sam Ward
- Editor: Paul Machliss
- Running time: 30 mins (inc adverts)
- Production company: Big Talk Productions

Original release
- Network: Comedy Central
- Release: 2 June – 21 July 2015

Brotherhood is a British sitcom that was broadcast on Comedy Central since 2 June 2015. It was cancelled after one series.

== Premise ==
The series centres around three brothers: Dan (age 25), Toby (aged 23) and Jamie (aged 14). Since their mother died six months before the events of the series, Dan and Toby have become the guardians of Jamie who hasn't said a word since the death. The two also have to get their aunt Debbie off their backs as she believes that she should be the one caring for Jamie.

== Cast ==
=== Main cast ===
- Ben Ashenden as Dan, the eldest of the three brothers. He is a sarcastic joker and is forever trying to get the upper hand on his live wire colleague Poppy. (8 episodes)
- Johnny Flynn as Toby, the middle brother. He is a naive sweetheart, laid back and hopes to get together with Jamie's teacher Miss Pemberton. (8 episodes)
- Scott Folan as Jamie, the youngest brother (14 yrs old). Since his mother's death, he hasn't said a word and is stuck in the middle when Dan and Toby clash. (8 episodes)
- Gemma Chan as Miss Pemberton, Jamie's teacher. She had a one-night stand with Toby who still wishes to be with her. (3 episodes)
- Ellie Taylor as Poppy, Dan's colleague. She is a magazine journalist and quite a live wire. (8 episodes)
- Sarah Hadland as Aunt Debbie, Christopher's mother and Dan, Toby and Jamie's aunt. She feels that she should have been the rightful guardian of Jamie and seems more concerned about his welfare and upbringing than that of her own son Christopher.(4 episodes)

=== Guest stars ===
- Dillon Cox as Christopher, Debbie's son and Dan, Toby and Jamie's cousin. (1 episode)
- Joseph Alessi as Alfonso (1 episode)
- Ewan Bailey as Uncle Borek (1 episode)
- David Brain as Guy Bolton (1 episode)
- Jack Brazil as Steve (1 episode)
- Simon Brzezicki as Bus Driver (1 episode)
- Georgina Campbell as Katherine (1 episode)
- Nicholas Croucher as Wildman (1 episode)
- Mark Davison as Boat Guy (1 episode)
- Joey Ellis as Jack (1 episode)
- Cameron Farrelly as Cool Kid (1 episode)
- Alhaji Fofana as El Diabolo (1 episode)
- James Gordon as Bearded Gamer (1 episode)
- Francis Johnson as Delivery Man (1 episode)
- Charles Lawson as Aidan Barrett (1 episode)
- Alex Lowe as Commentator (1 episode)
- Stevie Martin as Ruth (1 episode)
- Tracy Ann Oberman as Terri (1 episode)
- Freya Parker as Margot (1 episode)
- Adam Prickett as office Worker (1 episode)
- Julia Rosnowska as Blanka (1 episode)
- Ahir Shah as Tom (1 episode)
- Andre Skeete as Man in office (1 episode)
- Camille Ucan as Sophie (1 episode)
- Tony Way as Barry (1 episode)
- Spike White as Sir Fartalot (1 episode)

== Episodes ==
=== Season 1 (2015) ===
No.	Title	Directed by	Written by	Original release date
1	"School"	Martin Dennis	Patrick Carr & Paul McKenna	2 June 2015
Following the death of their mother sensible receptionist Dan and irresponsible layabout Toby are looking after their thirteen year old brother Jamie, who has not spoken to them in six months. Against the advice of their critical aunt Debbie they attend Jamie's parents' evening and Toby is surprised to find the form teacher Miss Pemberton is the girl he slept with last night. The brothers are hurt that Jamie will speak to Miss Pemberton and not them but Dan feels closer to Jamie after giving up the opportunity to cover a Celine Dion concert to be with him.
2	"Poppy"	Dominic Brigstocke	Patrick Carr & Paul McKenna	9 June 2015
Dan's dizzy colleague Poppy turns up, homeless and wanting to stay. Dan is reluctant but Toby is enthusiastic when she brings her all-girl exercise class to the flat. After a while Poppy gets on Dan's nerves and he tries to get her to leave but is Toby, who actually succeeds - though not in the way Dan had wanted.
3	"Language"	Dominic Brigstocke	Patrick Carr & Paul McKenna	16 June 2015
Dan falls for Polish shop assistant Blanka, who can speak no English, and the phrases Poppy gives him from her Polish ex-boyfriend are hardly appropriate. Dan asks Blanka to dinner and is making headway but the romantic evening is wrecked by the language barrier and Blanka's peanut allergy. Elsewhere Toby makes money out of Jamie's skill at the video arcade.
4	"Birthday"	Martin Dennis	Patrick Carr & Paul McKenna	23 June 2015
Dan throws a birthday party for Jamie but gets his age wrong and gives him a jacket which Auntie Debbie reckons makes him look like a Dutch porn star. Nor does Toby help by revealing that he has had Jamie's eyebrow pierced and frantically summoning Miss Pemberton to ask if he has given her a sexually transmitted disease. And with Poppy getting drunk and throwing herself at Jamie's school-friends only Auntie Debbie's present seems likely to salvage the party.
5	"Mating"	Dominic Brigstocke	Andrew Dawson, Steve Dawson & Tin Inman	30 June 2015
Poppy arranges a blind date for Dan with the garrulous Katherine but it involves his pretending to be a doctor and when he comes clean she dumps him. Toby meanwhile is impressed by the dating profile of macho hunk Guy Bolton and sets out to 'accidentally' meet him and become his best friend but loses out when Guy takes a shine to Poppy. Thus both brothers end up alone and back home being consoled by Auntie Debbie.
6	"Pregnant"	Dominic Brigstocke	Patrick Carr & Paul McKenna	7 July 2015
Toby is initially horrified when Miss Pemberton tells him that he has impregnated her but decides to become more responsible and even proposes to her - though she turns him down. In fact the supposed pregnancy turns out to be a false alarm, allowing him to revert to his old childish ways again. Jamie, meanwhile, becomes traumatized by Poppy's insistence that they watch zombie movies together
7	"Work"	Dominic Brigstocke	Patrick Carr & Paul McKenna	14 July 2015
Dan decides Toby should get a job and recruits him to assist sandwich seller Alfonso. New head of resources Terri takes a saucy interest in Toby and, when Dan falls sick with the flu caught from Jamie, she gives him his brother's old job. Toby is of course hopeless and in order to reinstate Dan and revert to his old idle ways takes drastic action.
8	"Dad"	Dominic Brigstocke	Patrick Carr & Paul McKenna	21 July 2015
The boys' drunken father, travel writer Aidan Bennett, who deserted them years ago, returns and wants to stay whilst he pens his new book. Poppy, Jamie and Toby are delighted but Dan feels aggrieved and is vindicated after a disastrous fishing trip. Aidan moves on but for whatever reason at least Jamie starts speaking again. His first words are "We'll be all right".
