= Deep Cover (2025 film) =

British action comedy film

- Promotional release poster
- Directed by: Tom Kingsley
- Written by: Derek Connolly; Colin Trevorrow; Ben Ashenden; Alexander Owen
- Produced by: Walter Parkes; Laurie MacDonald; Colin Trevorrow
- Starring: Bryce Dallas Howard; Orlando Bloom; Nick Mohammed; Paddy Considine; Ian McShane; Sean Bean
- Cinematography: Will Hanke
- Edited by: Mark Williams
- Music by: Daniel Pemberton
- Production companies: Metro-Goldwyn-Mayer; Metronome Film Company; Parkes+MacDonald ImageNation
- Distributed by: Amazon MGM Studios
- Release date: 12 June 2025
- Running time: 100 minutes
- Countries: United Kingdom; United States
- Language: English

Deep Cover is a 2025 action comedy film directed by Tom Kingsley and written by Derek Connolly, Colin Trevorrow, Ben Ashenden and Alexander Owen. The film stars Bryce Dallas Howard, Orlando Bloom and Nick Mohammed as improv actors recruited by the police for undercover operations in the London criminal underworld, where they must use their skills to infiltrate a gang. Paddy Considine, Ian McShane and Sean Bean appear in supporting roles.

Deep Cover was released worldwide on Amazon Prime Video on 12 June 2025. The film received positive reviews from critics.

== Plot ==
Kat Bryant is teaching improv classes in London, having made no career or relationship progress in a decade while her friends are all established. Among her new students are Marlon and Hugh. Marlon is an unsuccessful actor whose detailed character research and inclination toward dramatic monologues results in failed auditions and abandonment from his agent. Hugh is a lonely and insecure technical support worker at a brokerage, where he has been cautioned for inappropriate attempts at socializing. Detective Sergeant Graham Billings of the Metropolitan Police recruits the three for a low-level undercover sting operation. (Note: Billings initially suggests that improv actors are better suited to staying in character in unexpected scenarios.)

The trio are sent to expose a convenience store's participation in the illicit cigarette trade. Kat, as "Bonnie", leads as point; Marlon, as "Roach", covers as her wingman; and Hugh, as "The Squire", covers their backs and watches the door. They succeed in their task but Marlon's uncompromising character demands more and the clerk drives them to mid-level drug dealer Fly who offers to sell them three bricks of cocaine. They are about to close the deal when an Albanian gang burst in, as Fly's associate Shosh had earlier stolen the cocaine from them. (Note: Shosh steals the cocaine from the Albanians in an action sequence shown in the film's introduction.) Kat calms the situation and claims that she is selling the cocaine to Fly, but instead sells it to the Albanians who leave peacefully.

Billings insists that the undercover operation continue. The trio return to Fly for work, and he sends them to collect a debt from Sagar, a retired hitman. Marlon's theatrics successfully intimidate Sagar who flees and is fatally struck by a van. Detective Inspector Dawes leads the police investigation of Sagar's death, and suspects the trio are professional criminals taking over the local drug trade.

Fly is pleased when the trio return with the money and celebrates his birthday with them. During the night they encounter Kat's friends who are scared away by Fly and Shosh. The trio accompany Fly to a meeting with his boss, Metcalfe, who reveals that he had a business arrangement with the Albanians which has been jeopardized by recent events.

Kat wants to quit, believing Metcalfe is too dangerous, but Billings insists that they continue. They attempt to negotiate with dealer K-Lash for more cocaine, but she doesn't have any. Marlon tries to intimidate her but his bluffs are exposed, forcing them to flee. Billings arrives and is shown to be corrupt, blackmailing the trio. He is the only one who can prove their innocence, but Shosh arrives and kills him. Metcalfe is convinced that Billings had an informant.

While disposing of Billings's body, the trio lose their vehicles during a police chase. Kat goes to a dinner party which is actually an intervention, given her sudden and secretive change in behaviour. Kat dramatically confesses to needing help while Marlon steals car keys, and Hugh defends the body from a neighbourhood dog. They drive away, meet Shosh and bury the body.

Kat and Marlon learn that Metcalfe is having Billings' phone hacked and try to retrieve it, but it is a trap which exposes them as the informants. Fly takes them to a remote area and feigns killing them but lets them go, liking them and believing that Metcalfe went too far. The three consider fleeing the country but they are arrested by the police.

Dawes learns the trio's real identities and is reluctant to file charges, but is under pressure to deliver major drug arrests. Kat suggests sending them in undercover to work Fly as an informant, since he trusts them and is disillusioned with Metcalfe. Fly wears a wire but as part of a drug exchange Metcalfe gives Fly to the Albanians for execution. The trio intervene, pretending to be undercover police officers to extract Fly. They succeed in the bluff and get Metcalfe to incriminate himself. The police rush in and make arrests, while Shosh kills Metcalfe to protect Fly and the trio. Fly, learning that they are improv actors, rewards them each with cash from Metcalfe's briefcase.

Afterwards, Marlon impresses a casting agent with his authenticity, Hugh pursues his passion by opening a wine shop, and Kat's improv group becomes immensely popular amid rumours of their undercover work.

== Cast ==
- Bryce Dallas Howard as Kat
- Orlando Bloom as Marlon
- Nick Mohammed as Hugh
- Paddy Considine as Fly
- Sonoya Mizuno as Shosh
- Ian McShane as Metcalfe
- Sean Bean as DS Billings
- Ben Ashenden as DI Dawes
- Alexander Owen as DS Beverley
- Omid Djalili as Sagar
- Nneka Okoye as K-Lash
- Freya Parker as Harriet
- Sophie Duker as Ellen
- Susannah Fielding as Ruth
- Katy Wix as Lotta

== Production ==
The film was announced in February 2024, with Tom Kingsley set to direct. It was based on an original story by Derek Connolly and Colin Trevorrow, and written by British comedy duo Ben Ashenden and Alexander Owen. The project was produced by Trevorrow through Metronome Film Co., alongside Walter F. Parkes and Laurie MacDonald, with Annys Hamilton serving as co-producer.

The main cast—Bryce Dallas Howard, Orlando Bloom, Sean Bean, Nick Mohammed, Ian McShane, Paddy Considine, and Sonoya Mizuno—was announced on 1 February 2024.

Principal photography began on 5 February 2024 in London.

== Release ==
Deep Cover was released globally on Amazon Prime Video on 12 June 2025.

The film premiered exclusively on the streaming platform as part of Prime Video's 2025 summer slate of original British productions.

== Reception ==
On the review aggregator website Rotten Tomatoes, 90% of 61 critics' reviews are positive, with an average rating of 6.7/10. The website's consensus reads: "Like any good improv comedy skit, Deep Cover treats an amusing setup with a freewheeling sense of fun while giving each of its performers their time to shine." Metacritic, which uses a weighted average, assigned the film a score of 67 out of 100, based on 10 critics, indicating "generally favorable" reviews.
