= Everyone Else Burns =

British television sitcom

- Genre: Sitcom
- Created by: Dillon Mapletoft; Oliver Taylor
- Written by: Dillon Mapletoft; Oliver Taylor
- Directed by: Nick Collett; Jamie Jay Johnson
- Starring: Simon Bird; Kate O'Flynn; Amy James-Kelly; Harry Connor; Morgana Robinson
- Countries of origin: United Kingdom; United States
- Original language: English
- No. of seasons: 2
- No. of episodes: 12

Production
- Executive producers: Tony Hernández; Dillon Mapletoft; Nicki Perkins; Brooke Posch; Laura Roseam; Oliver Taylor; Simon Bird
- Producer: Molly Seymour
- Editor: Mike Holliday
- Production companies: Jax Media; Universal International Studios

Original release
- Network: Channel 4
- Release: 23 January 2023 – 14 November 2024

Everyone Else Burns is a television sitcom made for Channel 4 by JAX Media and Universal International Studios, starring Simon Bird, Kate O'Flynn, Amy James-Kelly, Harry Connor and Morgana Robinson. The first series premiered in January 2023, with a second broadcast in October 2024; all episodes were made available at once on streaming.

== Synopsis ==
A coming-of-age sitcom about a Manchester family who are part of a puritanical Christian sect.

== Cast and characters ==
- Simon Bird as David Lewis, the patriarch of the Lewis family whose passion for keeping his family in line with the scripture of the Order stems from his desperation to gain influence in his chapter, usually in complex, bizarre fashion that distances himself from his wife and children.
- Kate O'Flynn as Fiona Lewis, whose servile existence is starting to grate, and who – after almost two decades dedicated to her family – starts to explore her own interests and ambitions, discovering how they are incompatible with the misogynistic and demanding setup of the Order.
- Amy James-Kelly as Rachel Lewis, the teenage daughter of David and Fiona who is starting to bore of the restrictions imposed on her by the Order – discovering that her attempts to escape the life expected of her are difficult to carry out, and that her yearning for more has pitfalls of its own.
- Harry Connor as Aaron Lewis, the young son of the family whose staunch adherence to the Order's text sees him express disapproval of his family, believing himself to be the most pious among them; this compounds his isolation from others his age and he spends his free time honing his precocious drawing skills.
- Morgana Robinson as Melissa, the new, lesbian neighbour of the Lewises, who aids Fiona's newfound confidence to express herself and discover life outside of the home.
- Ali Khan as Joshua, a teenage boy Rachel meets on her doorstep proselytising, whom she comes to fall in love with despite it being forbidden. He has his own complicated history with the Order.
- Arsher Ali as Elder Samson, the head of the local chapter of the Order who uses his power to the fullest, ruling with an iron fist. He demands strict adherence to the Order's principles and is unaccommodating of those who fall short of his edicts.
- Al Roberts as Elder Abijah, whose desire for a more lackadaisical approach to enforcing the rules of the chapter sees him clash with Elder Samson on fundamental matters.
- Kadiff Kirwan as Andrew, a neighbour of the Lewises whom David envies due to his popularity and position of influence within the Order.
- Liam Williams as Joel, a new convert to the Order looking for renewed purpose in life after an acrimonious split from his girlfriend.
- Lolly Adefope as Miss Simmons, teacher at the Lewis children's school whose turbulent personal life frequently crosses into her professional one.
- Soph Galustian as Julia, a young Order member with excellent skills for duplicity and teaching Rachel the ways of the world outside of the Order.
- Kath Hughes as Sid
- Sian Clifford as Maude (series 2), a demure new arrival to the chapter who instantly becomes attracted to David, sharing his quirks and idiosyncratic principles.

== Episodes ==
=== Series 1 (2023) ===
All episodes were made available on All 4 prior to broadcast on 23 January 2023.

No.	Title	Directed by	Written by	Channel 4 airdate
1	"Episode One"	Nick Collett	Dillon Mapletoft, Oliver Taylor	23 January 2023
At the advent of the apocalypse, the deeply religious Lewis family evacuate to the hills, but it turns out to be just a dress rehearsal initiated by patriarch David. Anticipating a promotion to the role of Elder at his evangelical sect, The Order of the Divine Rod, David is considering quitting his job at a package sorting depot. Academically gifted daughter Rachel is proselyting when she finds the friendly ear of a young man called Joshua. When he asks about the practice of 'shunning' Rachel is shocked to find that he used to be in the order, but has been excommunicated. When fellow ordinand and widowed-neighbour Andrew is given the post of Elder, David is more than a little put out. Wife Fiona reaches out to neighbour Melissa so that she can watch TV.
2	"Episode Two"	Nick Collett	Dillon Mapletoft, Oliver Taylor	23 January 2023
Rachel is persuaded to get a mobile phone by her teacher in order to advance her university application for a course in medicine. She crosses paths with Joshua and starts to develop a rapport despite the fact he is persona non grata. On ministering visits to potential recruit Joel, David and son Aaron make a nuisance of themselves, prompting Elder Andrew to intervene and take over. Melissa convinces Fiona to start a business despite an ancient sect order declaring that women ‘have no place in the agora’.
3	"Episode Three"	Nick Collett	Dillon Mapletoft, Oliver Taylor	30 January 2023
Rachel is paired with outwardly prim and proper Sister Angelie to go out and save the souls of unbelievers, however, she soon discovers that Angelie is actually Julia and a serial rule-breaker. Persuaded to accept Joshua's invite to a party on her birthday, Rachel finds herself as the only guest at what the order considers a pagan ritual. David proposes a date night to Fiona in order to distract her from her increasingly successful business venture. Fiona's insistence on a Japanese noodle bar as the venue leads to a culinary epiphany for her husband.
4	"Episode Four"	Nick Collett	Dillon Mapletoft, Oliver Taylor	6 February 2023
Rachel and Joshua start dating. When Rachel asks her parents if she was excluded by the church, would they shun her, David and Fiona respond in the affirmative under the impression that the fear of shunning alone would act as a deterrent to their daughter ever stepping out of line and therefore never requiring them to act on the threat. David confesses he has a sexual fantasy about the Sun-Maid raisin girl and calls a crisis meeting with the church elders. Unimpressed with their dismissive attitude to his transgression, he undertakes penance at his Uncle's caravan. Elder Andrew under pressure from the sect to remarry, entrusts Fiona with his late wife's wedding band.
5	"Episode Five"	Nick Collett	Dillon Mapletoft, Oliver Taylor	13 February 2023
Rachel panics when she discovers applications for a degree in medicine close at midnight. Unable to find a computer to complete the online form she turns to Angelie/Julia for help and then takes refuge at Joshua's flat. Her discovery of photos on the laptop showing Joshua and Julia together forces her boyfriend to reveal the reason for his banishment from the church. Melissa accidentally gets Fiona drunk whilst they watch a racy movie. An awkward encounter ensues when Andrew calls round for the wedding ring which has become stuck on Fiona's finger. At the caravan, Aaron wants his father to accept the homoerotic nature of his religious drawings, but David cannot get his head around it.
6	"Episode Six"	Nick Collett	Dillon Mapletoft, Oliver Taylor	20 February 2023
Joshua turns up to church to ask forgiveness from chapter leader Elder Samson who is revealed to also be his father. Rachel discovers her university application has been withdrawn without her knowledge. When her mother admits to being the guilty party, the two fall out. At the church's annual gathering, inter-chapter rivalries are high and the prize of Joel's conversion hangs in the balance until David has a heart-to-heart with him, a conversation which is inadvertently broadcast on the PA system. When Elder Samson gives Rachel an ultimatum, either to stay in the order (on penance) or go to university and be excommunicated, she decides to give up her hopes of becoming a doctor.

=== Series 2 (2024) ===
All episodes were made available on 3 October 2024 for subscribers to the paid tier of Channel 4's streaming service; this expanded to all users on 17 October 2024.

No.	Title	Directed by	Written by	Channel 4 airdate	UK viewers (millions)
1	"A Big Sexless Cardigan"	Jamie Jay Johnson	Dillon Mapletoft, Oliver Taylor	17 October 2024	N/A
Rachel is only able to quietly express her relief at the completion of her penance, which is cut short – as is her glee after learning of another potential career (as a paramedic) – and vanishes upon discovering the chapter is reintroducing arranged marriages. The announcement prompts Fiona to begin to question her own, especially after David grows curious about a forthright new arrival into the chapter. His actions at home, and in helping Aaron's attempts to rescue Elder Andrew from his pit of despair – and return him to the Order in the hopes of moderating the increasingly tyrannical Elder Samson – risk the remaining respect both his wife and son have in him.
2	"A Boot Loaded With Mass"	Jamie Jay Johnson	Dillon Mapletoft, Oliver Taylor	17 October 2024	N/A
The discovery she will need a driving license to become a paramedic deflates Rachel, more so when it David who insists on training her up – oblivious to his own track record of reckless road usage – which his unique teaching style worsens considerably. The arranged marriage mechanism has paired her up with the captivatingly bad-boy-esque Jebediah, but she struggles to cope after being also forced into company with Josh. Fiona manages to bring Aaron out of his funk – derived from being unable to help an increasingly errant-of-mind Andrew – by allowing him to publish his curiously homoerotic drawings as part of her business, which leads the pair into the eye-opening world of raving.
3	"An Innocent Exchange of Pie"	Jamie Jay Johnson	Dillon Mapletoft, Oliver Taylor	24 October 2024	N/A
Samson's unflinching, ardent bigotry has catastrophic implications for the chapter: the loss of their place of worship; David launches into action with a solution: the Lewis home as its replacement. This impingement on the family's privacy both worsens throughout the day (Fiona's usual implacably stoic countenance subject to immense strain upon discovering the boundless limits of the insatiable Maude's efforts to lure David) and proves valuable (for Aaron and Andrew's plot to learn the uncommunicated reasoning for the change of venue, which quickly turns into a vow to threaten and upend Samson's leadership). Rachel panics about her burgeoning 'relationship' with Jeb after he fails to impress while meeting her parents, and finds solace in a forlorn Josh in the unlikeliest of places.
4	"A Portal to Hell"	Jamie Jay Johnson	Dillon Mapletoft, Oliver Taylor	31 October 2024	N/A
The chapter – and notably Abijah personally – becomes riven in two by the decision to test the waters of the ordinands' confidence in Samson, as does David and Fiona's relationship as their instructions from Aaron on how to help Elder Andrew's campaign for a change in leadership leads them as close to temptation as possible; for David, the revelation of Maude's true intentions prompting the unearthing of what becomes a plot to ensure a certain candidate's victory. Jebediah's gradual morphing, in some respects, into the characterisation of how a man is expected to treat, and behave towards, his female partner within the Order frustrates and disappoints Rachel, who finds herself resting on Josh and his assistance to pursue her paramedic training.
5	"A New Order"	Jamie Jay Johnson	Dillon Mapletoft, Oliver Taylor	7 November 2024	N/A
Samson and Andrew's rift continues apace, the former on a vindictive streak; this comes to a head at Josh's 'stag do', where bowling turns competitive. Samson's excursion affords David and Aaron the opportunity to explore his secret home – a den of unalloyed opulence and decadence funded by embezzlement of Order funds – and, crucially, the chance for David to prove his self-worth and competence as a father to Aaron... but also to Fiona as a husband, who finds the path to fulfilment is reminiscing on the sort of man he used to be. Also on the path is Rachel; jealous after the announcement of Josh and Heather's wedding, she proposes to Jeb they should follow suit – although he is more keen to 'get to know' her first, prompting her to enlist Julia as her 'sex mentor' to find the whole concept less intimidating.
6	"A Real F***ing Crisis"	Jamie Jay Johnson	Dillon Mapletoft, Oliver Taylor	14 November 2024	N/A
David is devastated to learn the price he must pay for invading Samson's privacy is the loss of his privilege of being a part of the Order. Aaron becomes determined to avenge his father's exclusion, but succumbs to the rest of his family's view: that there isn't a place for them in the Order anymore. Fiona's exasperation with Maude's continued insertion into her marriage finally manifests, refusing to consider her time in the Order was for nothing. Rachel – fresh from being unceremoniously dumped by Jeb – races for Josh after he flees his own wedding, becoming crestfallen after he reminds her of the abject consequences of his previously upending his life for her. Abijah finds his lovelorn-induced depression worsened by having to organise such a ceremony, until he is greeted by an unexpected salve.

== Production ==
In May 2022, Channel 4 announced the project had been commissioned, with the cast in place, and JAX Media and Universal International Studios producing from a script written by Dillon Mapletoft and Oliver Taylor, and Nick Collett as director.

Speaking about his wig for the show, lead actor Simon Bird told The Independent: "My first reaction [upon seeing the wig] was laughter, annoyingly, which was pretty much everyone’s reaction. Which meant that we had to go ahead with it."

In May 2023, Channel 4 renewed the series for a second season. Sian Clifford joined the cast for the second series.

In April 2024, filming for the second series took place in Heaton Moor, Greater Manchester.

The sect to which the family belongs, although superficially inspired by the practices and beliefs of many actual groups, is entirely fictional. The show is fundamentally a comedy, as reflected in the comic name of the sect: "Order of the Divine Rod". The beliefs of the group also do not correlate well with even "puritanical Christian fundamentalism".

== Broadcast ==
Everyone Else Burns premiered in the UK on Channel 4 on 23 January 2023. The first season consisted of six episodes in total, which are also available to on the streaming service All4.

=== International broadcast ===
The series debuted in Canada on W Network on 29 May 2023. In the United States, the series debuted on The CW on 26 October 2023 before being pulled from its schedule in November 2023. Brad Schwartz, President of Entertainment of The CW, blamed the marketing of the show for it being pulled. The series is currently available in Australia on SBS On Demand.

== Reception ==
=== Viewership ===
The series opened to 1.4 million viewers with four weeks of post-broadcast viewership included. The show was "the biggest comedy launch since Derry Girls on Channel 4's streaming service".

=== Critical reception ===
Everyone Else Burns has received critical acclaim, with a 90% rating on Rotten Tomatoes.

Writing in The Daily Telegraph Anita Singh said "there is much to enjoy here. It's not a comedy going for cheap laughs about Christianity. It is a show about family, and it has a lot of heart" and said that the comedy derives from a "subversion of norms". She also praised the writing, performances and characterisation “from the leads down to the supporting players", noting that "there are truths about family and friends that make it seem like more than a throwaway sitcom." Lucy Mangan in The Guardian commented that it is "simply very, very funny" and that the "hyper-religiosity is used to look anew at family dynamics and dysfunction; how blind you can be to abnormalities if they are all you know". Carol Midgely in The Times described it as "a small delight" and praised the performance of Simon Bird and the cast, as well as the "sharply, wittily written" script, adding that "it is a brave comedy that targets religion, but only a clever one could do it with this much heart and jolliness." The i described it as "funny as hell" while, in a four-star review for The Evening Standard, Vicky Jessop wrote "who knew eternal damnation could be this fun?".

Reception in the United States has been similarly positive. Time Magazine described it as "a fantastically warped family sitcom” and “easily the best new broadcast comedy since Abbott Elementary". The New York Times labelled it "a charmer - smart, distinctive, lovely". The Hollywood Reporter called it "very funny" while The LA Times named it "a dysfunctional family comedy you can believe in". Similarly positive reviews came from The New York Post ("hell yeah") and The Daily Beast, which called it "really goddamn funny" and "the sort of laughs-at-any-cost sitcom rarely made in the UK these days".

=== Accolades ===
In February 2024, the series was nominated at the Broadcast Awards in the Best Comedy Programme category. In March 2025, O'Flynn was nominated at the 2025 British Academy Television Awards in the Best Female Performance in a Comedy category.
