= Cambridge University Amateur Dramatic Club =

Amateur Theatre Club of The University of Cambridge

- Cambridge University Amateur Dramatic Club Logo
- Abbreviation: CUADC
- Formation: 1855
- Type: Amateur Theatre Group
- Location: Park Street, Cambridge, UK
- President: Scarlett Clegg
- Senior Treasurer: Dr. Richard Barnes
- Website: cuadc.org

The Cambridge University Amateur Dramatic Club (CUADC) is the oldest university dramatic society in the UK, the largest dramatic society in Cambridge, and the resident society of the ADC Theatre.

The club stages a diverse range of productions every term, many of them at the fully equipped ADC Theatre and The Corpus Playroom in Cambridge, and annually at the Edinburgh Fringe and occasionally on tour abroad.

== History ==
The Cambridge University Amateur Dramatic Club was officially founded during the Easter Vacation of 1855 by F.C. Burnand and a group of his friends, who had acquired back rooms in the Hoop Hotel on Jesus Lane during the course of the previous year. The university's response to the project was reported to have been ‘unfavourable’, but this did nothing to dampen the enthusiasm of those involved. The club's first presentation was a series of short one act plays, of which the club's first minute book reports that ‘the receipts were scanty, but a start was effected’.

Over the course of the next five years, the society grew slowly but steadily. A contribution of £5 from each of the club's members allowed the club to pay for the renovation of their cramped and bare rooms, and in 1860 the new stage at the Hoop Hotel, roughly on the site of the current building, was opened.

Though the university's approval was initially begrudging, attitudes towards the club changed over the course of the next 40 years, and by the beginning of the 20th century the club was a nationally renowned and respected group. The Hoop Hotel stage was destroyed in a fire in 1939. Support flooded in, including messages of goodwill from the King, and 18 months later a new building was opened by the club.

The club continued to run the theatre until it ran into financial difficulties in 1974 when the university took over the running of the theatre, as a department of the university leasing the building from the club for a nominal annual fee.

== Activities ==
The CUADC puts on around 20 shows every year. Many are performed at the 228-seater ADC Theatre, where the club is the resident performing company.

Constitutionally, the club also has an obligation

to spread interest in the theory and practice of theatre, in all its aspects, by every possible means amongst those qualified to be Members of the Club; to encourage the active involvement of the same regardless of previous experience; and to maintain interest in the participation of activities at the ADC Theatre.

To this end, the club puts on a programme of professional and student-run workshops for actors, directors and technicians as well as a series of late-night experimental pieces known as Lateshows and stand-alone performances known as One Night Stands.

== Membership ==
Anybody aged 17 or over, studying for a qualification at the University of Cambridge, or who is engaged in full-time study at any other educational institution within Cambridge is eligible for ordinary membership.

== Committee ==
The club is run on behalf of its members by a committee of students of the university. The committee is in charge of show selection and support, as well as organisation of one-off events such as the annual garden party, annual club dinner, and freshers' fair.

There is also a senior treasurer, who, by university statutes, must be a senior member of the university.

== Past members ==
Alumni include:

- Peter Hall
- Richard Eyre
- Trevor Nunn
- Ian McKellen
- Derek Jacobi
- Michael Redgrave
- David Hare – club hiring manager 1968
- Corin Redgrave
- Emma Thompson
- Nicholas Hytner
- Simon Russell Beale
- Eleanor Bron
- Sam Mendes
- Tom Hollander
- Miriam Margolyes
- Griff Rhys Jones
- Rachel Weisz
- Sacha Baron Cohen
- Clive Swift
- Terrence Hardiman
- Eddie Redmayne
- Tom Hiddleston
- Lucy Moss
- Toby Marlow
- Emma Corrin

== See also ==
- ADC Theatre
- Pembroke Players
- The Marlowe Society
- Footlights
