= Seize Them! =

British Comedy film

- Theatrical release poster
- Directed by: Curtis Vowell
- Screenplay by: Andy Riley
- Produced by: Damian Jones; Matthew James Wilkinson
- Starring: Aimee Lou Wood; Nicola Coughlan; Lolly Adefope; Nick Frost; Jessica Hynes
- Cinematography: Ashley Rowe
- Edited by: Richard Shaw
- Music by: Rael Jones
- Production companies: DJ Films; Stigma Films
- Distributed by: Entertainment Film Distributors
- Release date: 5 April 2024
- Running time: 91 minutes
- Country: United Kingdom
- Language: English
- Box office: $325,210

Seize Them! is a 2024 British comedy film made by Entertainment Film Distributors, DJ Films and Stigma Films, directed by Curtis Vowell, written by Andy Riley, and produced by Damian Jones and Matthew James Wilkinson. It stars Nicola Coughlan and Aimee Lou Wood with a cast that includes Jessica Hynes, Nick Frost, Lolly Adefope, James Acaster and Ben Ashenden.

Seize Them! was released in the UK and Ireland on 5 April 2024.

== Plot ==
Set in Britain in the Dark Ages, the arrogant queen Dagan finds her castle besieged by rebels led by their leader Humble Joan using a special powder that destroys everything when near fire. When some of her guards abandon her, Dagan is forced to fend for herself against Joan, but when outmatched she flees. However, she is soon saved by a servant named Shulmay, as the pair safely escape from the carnage in the castle.

As they hide from the rebels searching for Dagan, Shulmay explains that her cousins plan to aid her, and with it an army to help Dagan take back her throne. The next day, the two come across a shit shoveler named Bobik, whom they convince to help them in their journey. While travelling, Shulmay confides in Bobik that when she was a child, she served as a servant to Dagan's father, who was a cruel king. But one evening when she arrived late and his dinner was cold, the king threatened to feed her to his wolves. The queen, Dagan's mother, pled for her life, and the young Shulmay served the queen instead. When she was dying, she instructed Shulmay to watch out for her daughter, especially in her darkest hour.

Meanwhile, Leofwine, Dagan's treacherous advisor who sided with Joan, is on the hunt for the fugitive queen.

When the fugitive trio arrive at the citadel, they try to get work for some money, but fail at first when Dagan accidentally breaks her shovel during a traumatic memory from her past. They manage to gain money using the broken end of the shovel and Dagan's voice in a puppet show for audiences to throw pebbles at. As the three celebrate their earnings, Shulmay tries to talk to Dagan about her mother, but she refuses to discuss the topic, as she cut all ties with her. However, Leofwine arrives looking for her, along with Humble Joan, who is offering the people a reward to find Dagan. In a panic, the trio flee into the woods, only to be separated. Leofwine catches up with Dagan and corners her, but Shulmay arrived just in time and kills her. The three use Leofwine's corpse as a decoy, by dressing her in Dagan's red dress and crown and throw her off the cliff so that Humble Joan will believe that she's dead. Shulmay explains to Dagan that her mother did love her, but her father separated the two as he believed her mother's love would make her weak. Dagan now finally accepts that her father was truly an evil man.

Meanwhile, Humble Joan, who has grown mad with power, starts to show cracks in her sanity, becoming just as tyrannical as Dagan was.

The trio finally make it to the beach to meet Dagan's cousins. However, Shulmay tells Dagan the whole truth; that her cousins only arrived for the powder and they wagered she would be overthrown. Feeling disheartened and deceived, Dagan lashes out at Shulmay, and accuses her of stealing her mother's love. Upset, Shulmay leaves, along with Bobik, who truly sees Dagan's selfishness.

As Humble Joan has a meeting with the cousins, Shulmay plans to turn Dagan over to her but has a change of heart. The three are eventually captured, and Joan demonstrates the powder's power by blowing off Dagan's toes, causing severe bleeding. When she tries to use a cannon on her, Shulmay and Bobik intervene; setting off a chest full of powder and killing nearly all of Joan's men. Humble Joan, now Mad Joan, attempts to kill Dagan until the latter gets the upper hand and brutally kills her nemesis.

Feeling disillusioned, a dying Dagan makes Shulmay the new queen, believing she would make a better leader than she, her father or Joan were. Shulmay accepts. Disappointed that they're not going to get their powder, the cousins leave. Meanwhile, Bobik, with a radical idea, saves Dagan's life by using a tiny amount of the powder and flame to seal her wound. Grateful, Dagan dubs Bobik Earle Bobik. The trio leave to the citadel for Shulmay's coronation.

The film ends with Shulmay as queen, Bobik as Earle, and Dagan living happily as an entertainer - although she still has some of that royal temperament when a couple of kids steal her earnings.

== Cast ==
- Aimee Lou Wood as Queen Dagan
- Lolly Adefope as Shulmay
- Nicola Coughlan as Humble Joan
- Jessica Hynes as Leofwine
- Nick Frost as Bobik
- James Acaster as Felix the Ironmonger
- Ben Ashenden as Penda the rebel
- Paul Kaye as King Ivarr
- John Macmillan as King Guthrum
- Nitin Ganatra as Witgar the baker
- Matthew Cottle as Alric the painter
- Mark Hillman as Soldier with Mace
- Ben Rufus Green as Osmund the leather maker

== Production ==
Seize Them! was written by Andy Riley and directed by Curtis Vowell. The film was financed by Entertainment Film Distributors and produced by Damian Jones and Mathew James Wilkinson. Nigel Green, Jack Webb, Sophie Meyer, Paul Grindey and Andy Riley acted as executive producers for the film.

=== Casting ===
In March 2022 Aimee Lou Wood, Lolly Adefope, Nicola Coughlan, Nick Frost and Jessica Hynes were confirmed in the cast. Later, James Acaster was confirmed in the role of Felix the iron monger. Wood was quoted as saying “There are so many poo jokes, there is so much silliness. I have never laughed so much on a set.”

=== Filming ===
Principal photography began in London in March 2022. Other filming locations included Kent and Wales, with filming scheduled for six weeks.

== Release ==
The film was released by Entertainment Film Distributors in the United Kingdom and Ireland on 5 April 2024.

== Reception ==
On the review aggregator website Rotten Tomatoes, 58% of 12 critics' reviews are positive, with an average rating of 5.2/10. Metacritic, which uses a weighted average, assigned the film a score of 44 out of 100, based on four critics, indicating "mixed or average" reviews.
