= Torch Theatre, Milford Haven =

Theatre and cinema in Milford Haven, Pembrokeshire, Wales

Coordinates: 51°42′55″N 5°02′24″W

Torch Theatre
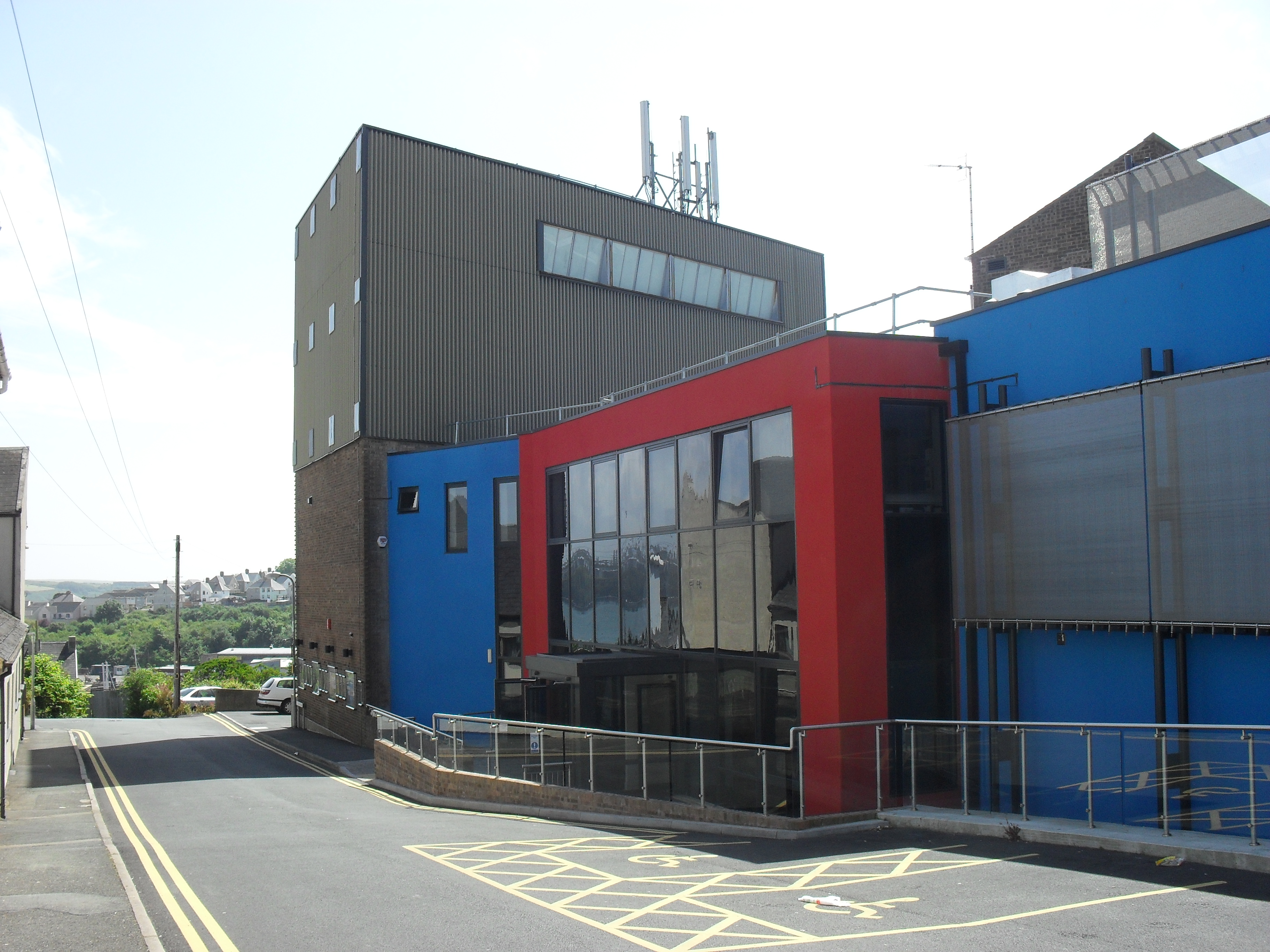
- Address: St. Peter's Road; Milford Haven, Wales
- Owner: Torch Theatre Company
- Capacity: 297 (Main House); 102 (Studio Theatre)
- Opened: 1977

Website
- www.torchtheatre.co.uk

The Torch Theatre is a not-for-profit theatre in Milford Haven, Wales.

Established in 1977, it is one of only three building-based producing theatres in the whole of Wales. The initial concept was a small community enterprise, linked with a Further Education centre in the adjacent building. Expansion however meant that it became a much larger project. The theatre was designed by local architect, Monty Minter. It was built at a cost of £500,000, and opened with a production of Relatively Speaking. As well as hosting touring productions, the Torch possesses its own independent theatre company which produces and tours its own shows. Since the late 1980s, it has been the only cinema in the town.

In 2006, the theatre commenced a £5.4 million redevelopment. In August 2007, Milford Haven Town Council voted to cut the grant it provides to the theatre, which in turn will affect the much more substantial income from the Arts Council of Wales.
