= The Pin (comedy act) =

Comedy double-act composed of Ben Ashenden and Alexander Owen

- Notable work: Deep Cover

Comedy career
- Years active: 2013 – present
- Medium: Film; Theatre; Television; Radio
- Genres: Double-act; sketch comedy; surreal humour

The Pin is the comedy writing and acting partnership of Ben Ashenden and Alexander Owen. They co-wrote and performed in the Amazon MGM Studios film Deep Cover, which played at SXSW London and Tribeca Festival 2025 before being released on Amazon Prime. They also wrote and starred in The Comeback in London's West End, and recorded multi award-winning BBC Radio 4 sketch show The Pin from 2015 to 2019.

== Background ==
The double act met at the University of Cambridge, where they joined the Cambridge Footlights. Whilst members, they co-wrote and performed the sketch show ‘Good Clean Men’ with Joey Batey, Joe Bannister, Mark Fiddaman and Simon Haines, and they co-wrote and performed in two Footlights international tour shows: 2010's 'Good For You,' directed by Liam Williams and Daran Johnson, and 2011's 'Pretty Little Panic' directed by Keith Akushie and James Moran. They were also the satire editors of Varsity newspaper.

'The Pin' was originally the title of a show written and performed by Ashenden, Owen, and original member Mark Fiddaman in their final year at Cambridge in 2011. After graduating, the three moved to London and started developing shows at the Invisible Dot comedy club to take to the Edinburgh Festival Fringe. The Pin became a duo when Fiddaman left to pursue graduate studies at the University of Oxford.

== Works ==
=== Deep Cover ===
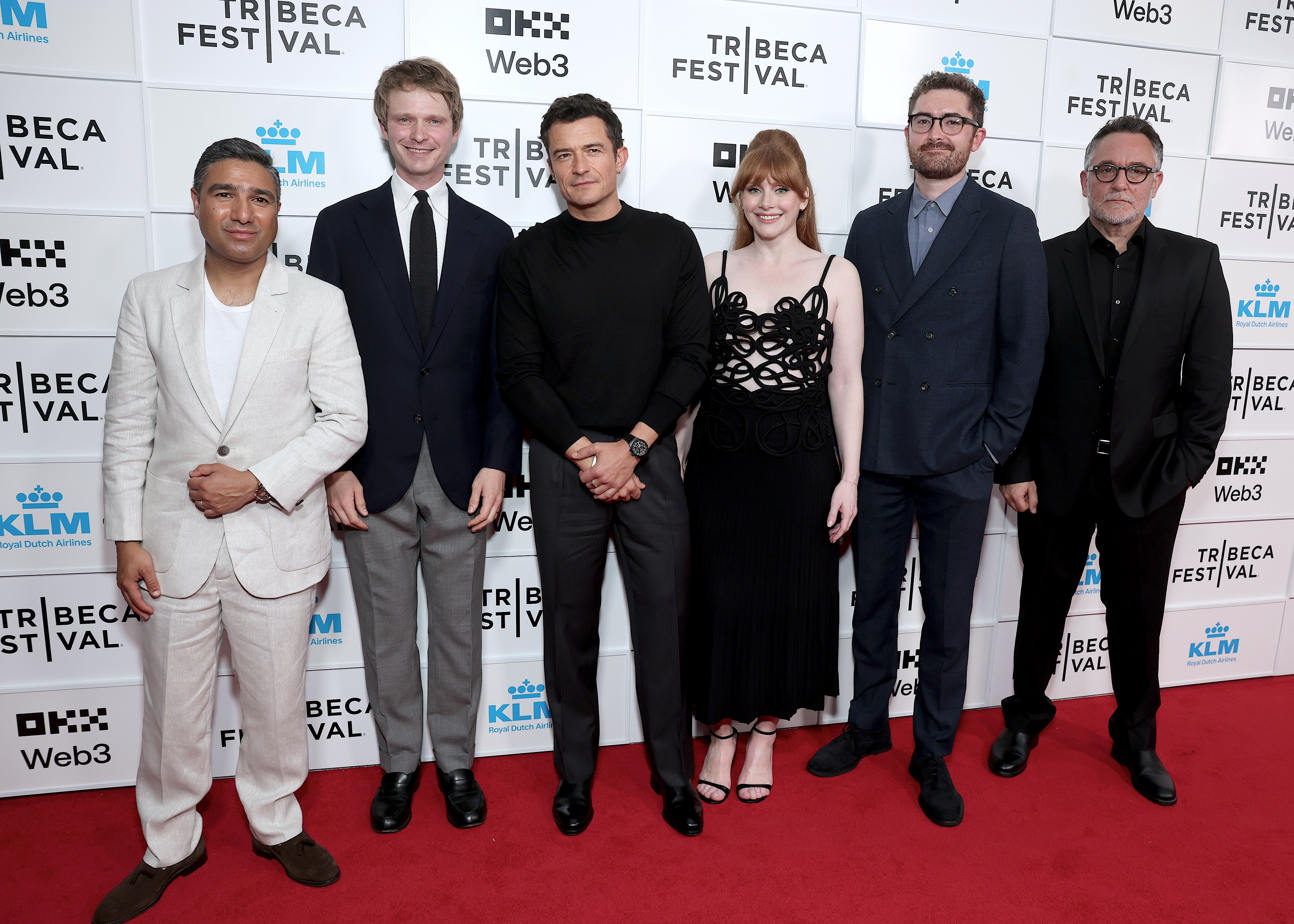
Nick Mohammed, Alexander Owen, Orlando Bloom, Bryce Dallas Howard, Ben Ashenden and Colin Trevorrow at Tribeca 2025 for the International Premiere of 'Deep Cover' (Amazon/MGM)

They co-wrote the feature film Deep Cover with Colin Trevorrow and Derek Connolly. They had supporting roles in the film as detectives.

=== The Comeback ===
The pair wrote and starred in a new play The Comeback at the Noël Coward Theatre in London's West End which opened on 8 December 2020 during the COVID-19 pandemic (with a socially distanced audience). The run was due to end on 3 January 2021, however due to the London Tier 3 restrictions announced by the government, the run was paused after 16 December 2020. It reopened on 7 July 2021 and ran until 25 July 2021.

=== The Pin (Live Act, and Radio Show) ===
Their shows at Edinburgh have garnered great critical acclaim from the likes of The Guardian, The Sunday Times, The Daily Telegraph, and more.

In 2015 the pair's debut BBC Radio 4 series, "The Pin", was aired with four 15-minute episodes. It is characterised by self-referential humour and breaking the fourth wall, with each sketch followed by brief commentary. It was followed by a second series in 2016, and a third in 2017 in the 6.30pm slot with half-hour episodes. A fourth series was broadcast in 2019.

=== Other work ===
Together Ashenden and Owen have acted in BBC comedy Ghosts, Netflix drama 1899, Studio Canal feature What's Love Got to Do with It?, Judd Apatow film The Bubble, Jurassic World Dominion, Stath Lets Flats, and A Whole Lifetime with Jamie Demetriou.

They have created BBC Three animated series Oi, Leonardo!, BBC Digital series What's Happening?, YouTube series Overheard, and Audible Original The Special Relationship, and wrote U&Dave series Live at the Moth Club.

== Awards ==
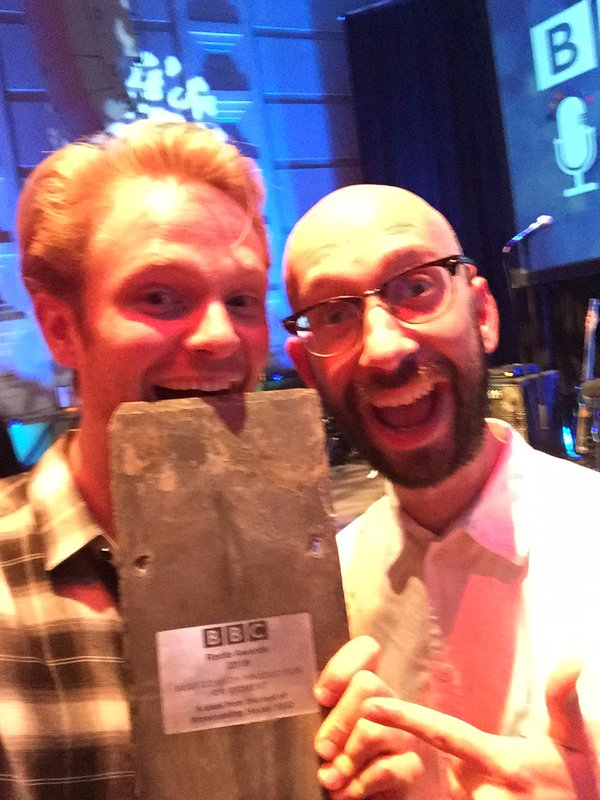
Alexander Owen and producer Sam Bryant at the BBC radio awards

The Pin was the 2013 winner of London Sketchfest's prize for 'Best Act,' and the first series of their Radio 4 show won them the award for 'Best Comedy' at the 2016 BBC radio awards.

They were nominated for the South Bank Sky Arts Award 'Breakthrough Act' 2021.

Their film Deep Cover was nominated at the 2026 Critics Circle Awards, and won the 2026 Writers Guild Award for best streaming motion picture.
