= Jonathan James-Moore =

British radio producer

Jonathan James-Moore (22 March 1946 – 20 November 2005) was an English theatre manager and BBC radio producer and executive.

He was born in Worcestershire and educated at Bromsgrove School and Emmanuel College, Cambridge, where he graduated with a degree in engineering and served as Footlights president. He managed theatres in Cumbria and London before joining the BBC as a radio producer in 1978. He eventually became Head of Light Entertainment, where he oversaw many of the most successful comedy series of the 1990s, including On the Hour, Knowing Me, Knowing You, Lee and Herring, The Harpoon, Harry Hill's Fruit Corner, and The League of Gentlemen.

James-Moore left the BBC in 1999 but continued to work in radio until his death from cancer in 2005.
