= Daran Johnson =

British comedy writer

Daran "Jonno" Johnson
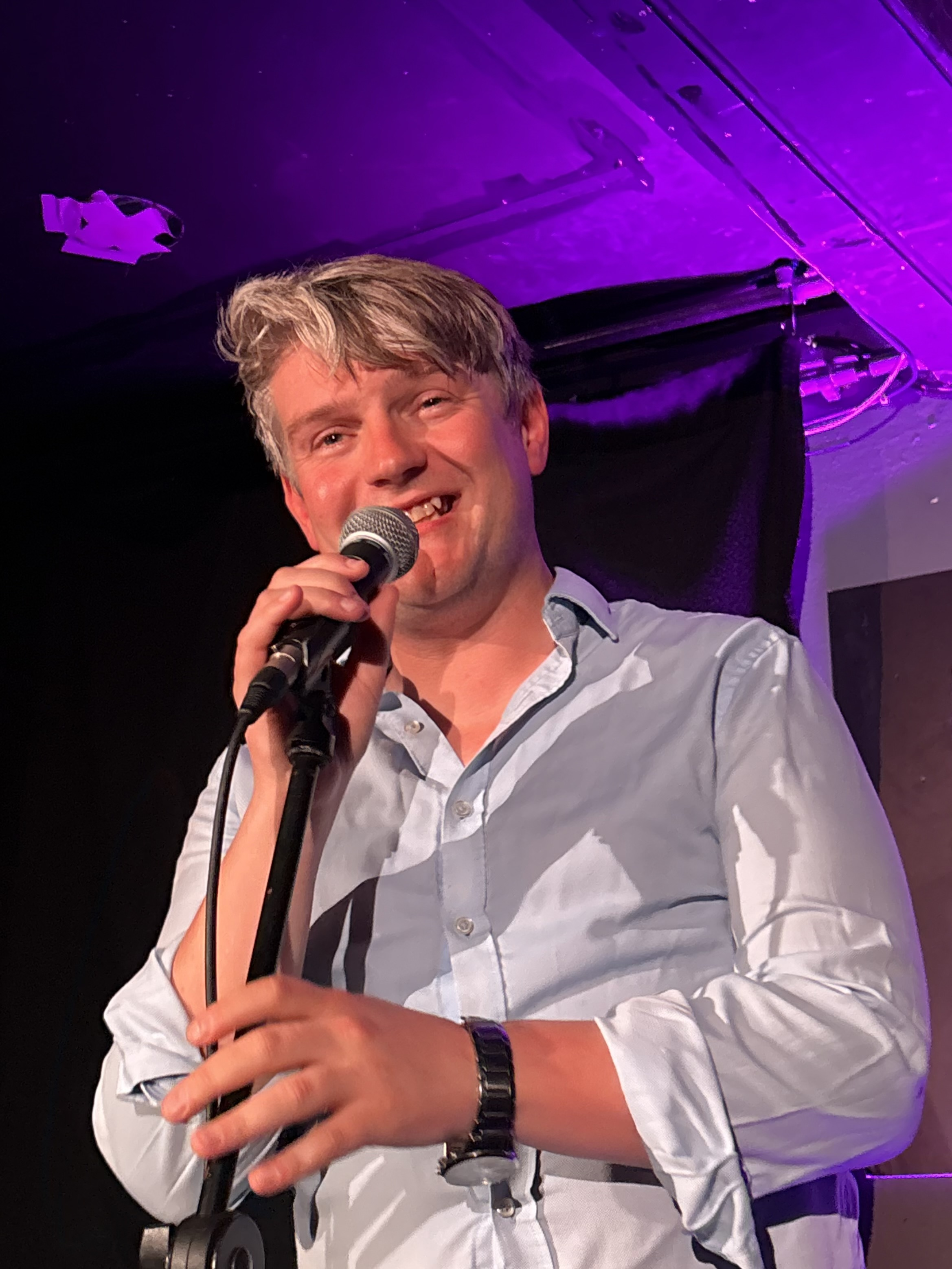
- Daran Johnson performing at Edinburgh Fringe Festival (2026)
- Born: 1987 or 1988 (age 38–39); Barnsley, Yorkshire, England
- Education: Cambridge University
- Notable work: Sheeps, Saturday Night Live UK

Comedy career
- Years active: 2009–present

Daran "Jonno" Johnson (born 1987 or 1988) is a British comedian and writer. He is a member of Sheeps comedy sketch group and head writer of Saturday Night Live UK.

== Early life and education ==
Johnson grew up in Barnsley, South Yorkshire. His parents were both teachers, and he is an only child.

Johnson attended the University of Cambridge, where he performed in Footlights alongside future collaborators Liam Williams and Al Roberts. He was Membership Secretary of Footlights in 2008-2009 and director of the 2010 Tour Show Good For You, the first Footlights show to tour America.

== Career ==
Johnson was awarded the Harry Porter Playwriting Prize in 2009, for his play Barry! Pull Your Finger Out! which was performed at the Edinburgh Festival Fringe in the same year.

In 2010, Johnson was a playwright for 24 Hour Plays at The Old Vic, in which young theatre-makers were challenged to put on a 15-minute play within one day.

Johnson is a member of the Sheeps comedy sketch trio alongside Liam Williams and Al Roberts. Sheeps has brought seven shows to the Edinburgh Festival Fringe since their 2011 debut, and has been described by The Guardian as "arguably the best sketch group of their generation".

In 2016, Johnson co-wrote and acted in 2016: Year Friends, a monthly web series created with his Sheeps collaborators. He also directed three episodes. The series expanded on their BBC Three sketch show pilot People Time, which was not commissioned despite positive reviews.

Johnson was a writer of the Rose D'Or nominated series Parlement, for which he was awarded a Grimme-Preis in 2021. In 2022, Johnson was credited as writer of episode 5 of Wedding Season. Johnson has also written for the television shows Elliott from Earth and Siblings, for which he was nominated for Best Comedy Writing on Television by The British Screenwriters' Awards 2016.

In 2024, Johnson was a composer on the album A Very Sheeps Christmas, a collection of 20 comedy songs. Its release was followed by a series of live concert performances.

Johnson was the head writer for the first series of Saturday Night Live UK. On 12 August 2026, it was announced that Johnson would return as head writer for the second series, joined by Laura Claxton as co-head writer.

Johnson's solo stand-up comedy show, Here Comes Mr Funny, debuted at Edinburgh Fringe Festival 2026.
