= Liam Williams (comedian) =

English comedian (born 1988)

- Born: March 1988 (age 38); Garforth, Yorkshire, England
- Education: Cambridge University
- Notable work: Ladhood

Comedy career
- Years active: 2009–present
- Medium: Stand-up, television, radio, theatre
- Website: liamwilliamscomedy.blogspot.co.uk

Liam Williams (born March 1988) is an English comedian, actor and writer, known for his wry poetic presentation style. He was nominated for Best Newcomer at the 2013 Edinburgh Comedy Awards and for Best Show at the 2014 awards.

== Early life and education ==
Williams grew up in Garforth, Yorkshire. His parents were civil servants.

Williams studied English at Homerton College at the University of Cambridge, where he was a member of Footlights. It was through the group that he met his later collaborators Daran Johnson and Al Roberts. In 2009, he participated in the Cambridge heat of the Chortle Student Comedy Award.

== Career ==
In 2013, Williams appeared as the guest stand-up on Russell Howard's Good News. Later that year he performed a solo show for the first time at the Edinburgh Fringe, where he was nominated for Best Newcomer at the Edinburgh Comedy Awards. It received a mixed 3-star review from the Guardian who said "Sense of fun is in short supply. Williams could sell this bleak world view more effectively, but the clarity of his vision, and his poeticism, overcome resistance." Williams also participated in a show with his fellow members of the comedy sketch group Sheeps, with Daran Johnson and Al Roberts.

In 2014, Williams performed a new show at Edinburgh, Capitalism. It was nominated for Best Show at the Foster's Edinburgh Comedy Awards. The show also received a five-star review from the Guardian. He also recorded a series of short clips for the Channel 4 online series Comedy Blaps, based on a previous routine. After the Edinburgh festival, Williams performed his show at the Soho Theatre and The Invisible Dot in London. He has also performed at the club with Sheeps.

Williams's 2015 Edinburgh show was called Bonfire Night. In 2015, Williams also wrote and presented a semi-autobiographical radio show titled Ladhood. The series was broadcast on BBC Radio 4. The second series of Williams's radio show Ladhood was broadcast on BBC Radio 4 in October 2017.

In 2015, Williams participated in the Comedy Feed sketch show pilot, People Time, for BBC Three alongside Daran Johnson and Al Roberts, Jamie Demetriou, Natasia Demetriou, Claudia O'Doherty and Ellie White. The Guardian said that "someone needs to invest big in People Time because it should be on television and soon". Comedian Adam Buxton said that it was the "best comedy thing I’ve seen in a long while". Despite its good reviews, it did not get commissioned. Continuing with the cast (minus O'Doherty), he co-created the web series 2016: Year Friends. Each episode was written by a different member of the troupe. The premise of the series is that a group of friends get together and make some new year's resolutions. The show is influenced by British mocumentaries including The Office and That Peter Kay Thing, as well as the nascent reality TV genre.

Also in 2016, Williams starred in the BBC Three comedies Uncle and Together and on Comedy Central UK's Drunk History.

In January 2016, Williams co-directed with Matt Bulmer a one-off performance of Shakespeare's The Twelfth Night featuring a cast of comedians including Kieran Hodgson, Tim Key and The Pin, with proceeds going to Refugee Action. The play was staged again, with an altered cast, in July 2016 at the Latitude Festival and during London Wonderground at the South Bank in London.

At the 2016 Edinburgh Fringe festival, Williams presented his debut play, Travesty, following previews in London. December 2016 and January 2017 saw the presentation of the panto Ricky Whittington & His Cat, co-written by Williams and Daran Johnson and starring Charlotte Ritchie alongside previous comedy collaborators.

In 2017, Williams wrote and starred in a web mockumentary series called Pls Like released by BBC Three. Williams played a struggling comedian who wins a contest to become the next superstar megavlogger, but must first undertake a series of challenges to win the attached £10,000 prize. Along the way, several successful YouTubers give him help and advice. The show was renewed for a second series in June 2018 and it was broadcast in September 2018; a third series was shown in January 2021.

Later in 2017, Williams and Josie Long co-wrote and co-starred in the BBC Radio 4 comedy Perimeter, part of the ’Dangerous Visions’ season on the station. Williams also appeared on the final episode of series 2 of Live from the BBC, performing a 30-minute set. The Netflix version of the series features his full one-hour set, made available on the streaming service in July 2018. In 2018, he also guest starred in the comedies Friday Night Dinner and Stath Lets Flats.

In February 2019, Williams appeared as a hacktivist in the first episode of This Time with Alan Partridge. He also played main character Nathan in the BBC series Back to Life starring Daisy Haggard.

Williams wrote and starred in a TV adaptation of his radio series Ladhood, whose first series was released on BBC iPlayer on 24 November 2019. Set in William's hometown of Garforth, the series explores themes of masculinity and class. In February 2020, it was announced that Ladhood had been renewed for a second series of six episodes, which was released in August 2021. The third and final series was released in September 2022.

Williams released his debut novel, Homes and Experiences, in 2020, available on hardback and audiobook.

Williams also appeared in Everyone Else Burns as a tragic convert to the show's 'Order of the Divine Rod' evangelical Christian cult.

== Personal life ==
Williams supports Manchester United.
