= Siblings (TV series) =

British sitcom

- The opening title sequence
- Genre: Sitcom
- Created by: Keith Akushie
- Written by: Keith Akushie
- Directed by: Dan Zeff
- Starring: Charlotte Ritchie; Tom Stourton
- Country of origin: United Kingdom
- Original language: English
- No. of series: 2
- No. of episodes: 12

Production
- Executive producers: Damon Beesley; Simon Wilson
- Producer: Phil Gilbert
- Production locations: West London, U.K.
- Running time: 30 mins
- Production company: Bwark Productions

Original release
- Network: BBC Three
- Release: 7 August 2014 – 8 February 2016

Siblings is a BBC Three sitcom starring Charlotte Ritchie and Tom Stourton in the lead roles. Written by Keith Akushie, the show piloted on 7 August 2014. A second series was commissioned by the BBC on 10 September 2014 before the first series had finished airing. The second series began broadcasting on 4 January 2016.

The last episode of the second series aired on 8 February 2016. Following BBC Three's move into an online based channel, on 18 July 2016, it was announced that no third series would be made.

== Plot ==
A sitcom following the lives of Hannah French and her best friend, younger brother Dan. They are lazy, selfish, carefree twentysomethings who share a flat in London. They look to lead easy, fun lives and frequently cause chaos.

== Production ==
=== Filming ===
The show was filmed in and around West London, England.

== Cast ==
- Charlotte Ritchie as Hannah. She is proud of her job at an insurance company's office, but is too lazy to do it properly. Wherever she can she tries to get herself time off or something else to make it easier. When she is not at work or resolving Dan's mess, she tries to find some way to party.
- Tom Stourton as Dan, Hannah's eccentric, naive, dim-witted brother. He has no qualifications and recently served a short prison sentence for a non-violent crime. He tries to be charming and is easily impressed. He often becomes bored and is often led by Hannah.
- Stella Gonet as Marion

== Episodes ==
Tom Stourton and Charlotte Ritchie

=== Series overview ===
Series	Episodes	Originally released	
Series	Episodes	First released	Last released
1	6	7 August 2014	11 September 2014
2	6	4 January 2016	8 February 2016

=== Series 1 (2014) ===
No.	Title	Directed by	Written by	Original release date	UK viewers (millions)
1	"Wheelchair Conference"	Keith Akushie, Daran Johnson	Dan Zeff	7 August 2014	TBA
Lazy Hannah works in an insurance company's London office. She gets away with doing little work because her alcoholic boss Andy does not notice. When he is sacked, she seeks to impress his successor Annette Walker (Tracy-Ann Oberman) and make her colleague Kevin seem bad by making up stories about him being unreliable, ill and homophobic. She claims that, like Annette's 23-year-old son Charlie, her brother Dan, who is the same age, is also in a wheelchair. In fact he is a selfish, bored, unemployed, immature scrounger. He gladly and immediately agrees to pretend to be unable to walk. He hits it off with Annette and Charlie when they have dinner at a restaurant. He makes up a far-fetched story of how he was rendered permanently unable to walk when his leg was crushed by a jet-ski in Puerto Rico seven years ago. Annette and Hannah get drunk at a conference and have a threesome with Yurki, a young waiter from Madeira. Dan joins Charlie's wheelchair basketball team and scores the winning goal – though he betrays his deception by getting up to do a victory dance. Charlie and Annette are angry with him, but Hannah's threat to Annette to expose the threesome means that she allows her to keep her job.
2	"Vet Drugs"	Keith Akushie	Dan Zeff	14 August 2014	TBA
Hannah's best friend Sadie returns from holiday with her handsome vet boyfriend Rich, announcing their engagement. Dan warms to Rich who gives him a part-time job as his receptionist, sadly unaware of how gormless he is. Hannah takes a disliking to him and is jealous. Dan and Hannah attend the engagement party, where her present – a DVD of Three Men and a Baby and a vibrator – is not well received. Hannah persuades Sadie to have a girls' night out and nearly kills her when she drugs her drink. Dan releases all the animals from the surgery who were due to be euthanised, infuriating Rich who finds out by watching the CCTV footage.
3	"Intern School"	Keith Akushie	Dan Zeff	21 August 2014	TBA
Hannah goes to give a careers talk at her old school. Most of her audience quickly take a disliking to her, but she impresses pupil Ellie, whom she takes on for work experience at her office. Ellie is enthusiastic, hardworking and efficient – and Hannah exploits her. However, when Ellie spends time helping Kevin, Hannah falsely claims to a teacher that injuries she sustained when a chest of drawers collapsed on her were caused by a series of assaults from Ellie. Hannah agrees with Ellie that she will drop the case against Ellie if Ellie refuses an offer of a summer placement at her office. Dan accompanies Hannah to the school, where he befriends three nerdy thirteen-year-old boys, whom he brings home to play video games and board games with. Dan learns that they have been bullied by 15-year-old Tom Flack, the younger brother of Jamie Flack, the boy who beat him up at school "just for being different". Dan organises a fight in the playground between the three and Tom to get his belated revenge. However, he is surprised when a teacher turns up to stop the fight, reveals that he is Jamie and tells Dan the real reason he beat Dan up – because he cut half of Jamie's finger off in DT.
4	"Laser Eye Date"	Keith Akushie, Joe Parham	Dan Zeff	28 August 2014	TBA
The siblings' demanding mother Marion insists that Hannah looks after her for two days at the flat whilst she is temporarily blind after laser eye surgery, but Hannah feels enslaved by her. Dan asks out Izzy, the free-spirited, pretty young doctor who examines him at the STD clinic. The two go on a date at a restaurant, where she gives him a footjob under the table, and he falls in love with her. Hannah and Dan take Marion to Izzy's party at her place, where he meets three young men who have each had a fling with Izzy. Marion is annoyed to have been brought to a party, whilst Izzy is disappointed that Dan brought his mother there. Hannah and Marion bond when they take revenge on Izzy's flatmate Pete for not letting Hannah drink his wine by vandalising his clothes. Dan is heartbroken when he finds Izzy having sex with a young man in a cupboard. The mother-daughter bonding ends when Marion regains her sight and is annoyed when Hannah joins her taekwondo class. Dan attempts to prove to Izzy that he is not "vanilla", so he invites her to the flat. It ends horribly for Dan when he electrocutes himself with two dildos which he had wired to a car battery, suffering electrical burns to both his hands.
5	"Burrito Neighbours"	Keith Akushie, Lucien Young	Dan Zeff	4 September 2014	TBA
Solicitor Gavin from the flat below asks Dan to feed his tropical fish whilst he is away for ten days, attending a business trip in Dubai. Miraculously the fish survive but, having the key to the flat, Dan passes himself off as Gavin, taking over his flat and throwing a party there. Gavin's girlfriend Amanda arrives, and is attracted to Dan. They have sex, then Gavin returns and throws him out. Hannah falls for busker Bryn, who used to be in a rock band. She is disappointed to find out that he became a born-again Christian three-months ago and has eschewed sex. He intends to move to Inverness, where he has been accepted on a two-year course at Bible college. Desperate to keep him in London and have sex with him, Hannah reunites him with his old band. He rejects her, as now he only wants sex with groupies.
6	"Balcombe's Funeral"	Keith Akushie	Dan Zeff	11 September 2014	TBA
Hannah and Dan attend the funeral of their old drama teacher Mr Balcombe, who has died aged 86. Hannah is thrilled to see Adam Piper, the boy who gave her her first kiss 12 years ago, and who moved to New Zealand. She is disappointed that he is going back to NZ tomorrow, and tries to re-ignite his attraction towards her. Dan meets his equally idiotic friends Jack and Sheriff, who encourage him to do stupid things – including ingesting all of Mr Balcombe's medication. Hannah seduces Adam, but is dismayed to learn from him that he did not give her that first kiss and loses interest in him. She is thrown out for trying to find out who did kiss her 12 years ago. She gets back into the house and asks the attendees who kissed her 12 years ago. Jack and Sheriff inform her that it was Dan who did it because they dared him to. She is horrified and Dan vomits.

=== Series 2 (2016) ===
No.	Title	Directed by	Written by	Original release date	UK viewers (millions)
7	"Kevin Rugby"	Keith Akushie	Dan Zeff	4 January 2016	TBA
When her doctor tells her she is dangerously unfit, Hannah begrudgingly heads to the gym, using her father's membership. There she meets Lucy, who introduces her to the world of women's rugby. Finally, Hannah has found a sport that suits her - in one training session she gets out 24 years of aggression. The team captain, Jenny, is hostile and jealous of Hannah, thinking that she is in a relationship with Lucy. Hannah collapses during an initiation rite which she and other new members are obliged to complete in order to be accepted onto the team. Dan goes to Hannah's office to return their coffee machine, which Hannah took home three months earlier. While there, he is hired as their cleaner. There he befriends 38-year-old insurance analyst Kevin, who has been sleeping under his desk every night for six weeks, since separating from his wife Lorraine. Dan takes it upon himself to turn Kevin's life around. Kevin and Dan go to Lorraine's house. Dan tries to persuade Lorraine to take Kevin back, but finds that she has a lover. Kevin collects his possessions from her. At Dan's suggestion, Kevin burns his possessions. The fire burns quickly, due to the flammable liquids from the cleaning cupboard which Dan poured onto the things. The fire burns Kevin's arm and face, after which Kevin will not talk to Dan. Dan buys a scooter and quits his job.
8	"Golden Aunt"	Lucien Young, Keith Akushie	Dan Zeff	11 January 2016	TBA
Jobless Dan has to be Marion's dance partner at her local salsa class, because she has threatened to stop his allowance from her if he does not. At the class, a young man called Ralph is also dancing with his mother. Dan and Marion go to her flat where they hear someone in the bathroom whom they at first think it to be a burglar. They find Marion's younger sister, Leslie, in the bath. Dan does not recognise her because he had not seen her since he was six. Leslie says that she is homeless after splitting up with her partner Spike and needs to stay there for a couple of nights. Marion refuses and dislikes Leslie because she is a scrounger and criminal. Dan gladly allows his only aunt to stay at his and Hannah's flat. Dan decides to refuse to continue to be Marion's dance partner when Leslie teaches him her philosophy that ownership is a mere concept to tie free spirits like her and Dan down. Leslie has an argument with Spike on the phone and he comes to the flat. Leslie and Spike each claim that the other owes them money. Leslie knocks Spike out (apparently with chloroform), and ties him to a chair in the flat, threatening to cut his toes off unless he pays her £500 that she says he owes her. Marion gives Leslie a £500 cheque to leave. Spike then reveals that the confrontation was a scam to again obtain money from Marion. Ralph becomes Marion's new dance partner and she reveals that she has had sex with him. Dan returns to being Marion's dance partner. Hannah wants to avoid heading in to work for the annual audit, because it will mean having to work later than usual. She asks Dan to pretend to be her doctor and tell her boss that she is too ill to come in. Dan's inability to do so due to dancing with Marion means that Hannah has to go in. When Hannah arrives, she finds the staff outside and the building cordoned off by the police because a headless corpse was found in the lift. The company above has been discovered to have been a front for a Chinese drug ring. This means that all staff have the week off while police investigate, which Hannah is delighted by. She becomes convinced she is having an uninterrupted week of lucky breaks, after being man called out "nice arse" to her and whom was then clipped by a van. This belief of hers is bolstered when the man delivering her pizza also gives her five pizzas which a prankster ordered and which otherwise would have been thrown away. She feels her belief is confirmed when she wins a two-night stay at a bed and breakfast in Swanage on a scratchcard. Hannah meets Katie, a girl whom she knew at school. Katie is directing a music video for a R&B star who is Hannah's favourite singer. Hannah replaces a dancer who had to quit due to being injured on-set. Hannah gets food poisoning and has diarrhoea during filming.
9	"Old Man Model"	Joe Parham, Keith Akushie	Dan Zeff	18 January 2016	TBA
Hannah embarks on a dating frenzy after signing up to the latest new mobile app - but the guys she meets are never as hot or cool as their profiles suggest. When she meets underwear model Dylan, she is delighted and thinks her luck has changed. However, she discovers Dylan lives with his ex-girlfriend Amy, who is now his best friend and is also a model. He interrupts sex with her to answer Amy's texts. Hannah makes him choose to only have one of them in his life, and he quickly chooses Amy. After a date with a boring man, Sandy, she tries to get back with Dylan. Her plan fails and he quickly gets back with Amy instead. Dan is surprised to see that Hannah has brought Sandy home. Dan is admitted to accident and emergency after accidentally shooting himself in the leg with a nail gun. At the hospital he meets Frank, a 62-year-old former adventurer who is suffering from kidney failure. Dan finds himself hooked on Frank's incredible travel stories and the two quickly strike up a friendship. When Frank tells Dan that he is terminal, he takes Frank out of hospital and they go to a fair, where Frank dies on a ride.
10	"Gregg and Lily"	Keith Akushie	Dan Zeff	25 January 2016	TBA
Hannah and Dan are surprised when their property developer father, Gregg, has organised himself a birthday party. Hannah is suspicious because it is out of character for him. When Gregg announces that he is to marry human rights lawyer Beverley, Hannah is angry that he has not discussed it with her. Gregg explains that Hannah has ruined all his other relationships, so it is no wonder he decided to keep it quiet. Hannah decides to prove Gregg wrong. Hannah spends time with Beverley's 8-year-old daughter Lily. Hannah accepts Beverley's request for her to supervise Lily's sleepover with her friends. Hannah scares the children by telling them about the Zodiac Killer. Lily's young teacher Axel Foley are attracted to each other and Hannah invites him to the house during the sleepover, falsely claiming it is her house and not mentioning the sleepover. She tricks Lily and her friends into being quiet and staying in Lily's room, then holds the shut from the hall side by jamming a chair under the door handle. Mr Foley hears banging noises from Lily's room, so Hannah tells them to be quiet. Lily tells her that she will tell Beverley if she does not let them go. Hannah and the children are surprised to see Mr Foley, naked with an erection. Dan decides to accept Gregg's suggestion to spend a week working alongside him in a bid to gain a permanent job with him. Dan meets Gregg's business associate Clive Yakamoto, a straight-talking middle-aged White British man who has a Japanese surname because he was adopted by a Japanese couple. Dan and Mr Yakamoto have an expensive dinner at the company's expense, then Dan hires a high-class call girl for Mr Yakamoto. At Mr Yakamoto's suggestion, Dan takes him and the prostitute to a golf course at night. They have sex in a bunker, while Dan waits on a golf cart. A security guard confronts them, and they try to escape on the cart. When it fails to start, Mr Yakamoto runs off and goes missing. Gregg confronts his children about how much trouble they have each caused. He tells them that he does not want to see either of them for at least six months.
11	"Baby Sack"	Daran Johnson, Keith Akushie	Dan Zeff	1 February 2016	TBA
Dan bumps into Holly Freeman, in a coffee shop. She was his crush in circus camp when he was 14. The pair are again attracted to each other and attempt to rekindle their relationship. However, Holly is eight months pregnant and the father is in Australia, where he impregnated her. Dan proposes to her in a restaurant; she turns him down and walks out. Hannah has been tasked with looking after George Harper, an arrogant American consultant from their New York office who is there to dismiss staff. She initially dislikes him because he treats her like his servant, but takes a liking to him when she is delighted to join him for a series of boardroom firings. He gives her a job at his office, and she tells her colleagues to fuck off. On the plane with George, she tries to force a noisy child to swallow one of George's sleeping pills. She is arrested and deported.
12	"Jack's Wedding"	Keith Akushie	Dan Zeff	8 February 2016	TBA
Dan’s best friend, estate agent Jack, is marrying the very wealthy Ophelia, whom he met when she was looking to buy a flat from him. Hannah is Dan's plus one for the big day. Dan is excited about the wedding and delighted to hear about the stag do in Thailand from Jack and best man Sheriff, which Dan was unable to attend due to not having a passport. Hannah opposes marriage as outdated, but enjoys snooping around Ophelia’s country mansion. She goes into a Mercedes car which Ophelia's father Charles has bought her for a wedding present. He angrily tells her to get out of the car. She meets Ophelia's brother Sebastian, who is as snobbish as his father. When Sheriff suddenly becomes ill and has to be taken to hospital, Dan becomes the best man. Hannah tells Dan that she remembers Sebastian being part of a hazing ritual during freshers week at her university in which she was covered in cream. She decides to take revenge against Sebastian. Dan tells the guests that he is now the best man. Hannah confronts Sebastian and demands an apology, which he refuses to give. Ophelia tells Dan that she is intending to call the wedding off, but he talks her into going through with it. Hannah and Dan walk in on Ophelia and Sebastian having sex. Charles talks to his children and Hannah and Dan together to get them to keep the incest secret. They agree, but Hannah demands the Mercedes and an apology from Sebastian for the cream incident. The wedding goes ahead and Dan gives a speech. Dan and Hannah go outside, where they see Sebastian shoot himself in the Mercedes.

== International broadcast ==
- Australia — The programme premiered on ABC2 on 13 January 2015.
