= ADC Theatre =

Theatre in Cambridge, England, and department of the University of Cambridge

Coordinates: 52°12′30.70″N 00°07′12.13″E

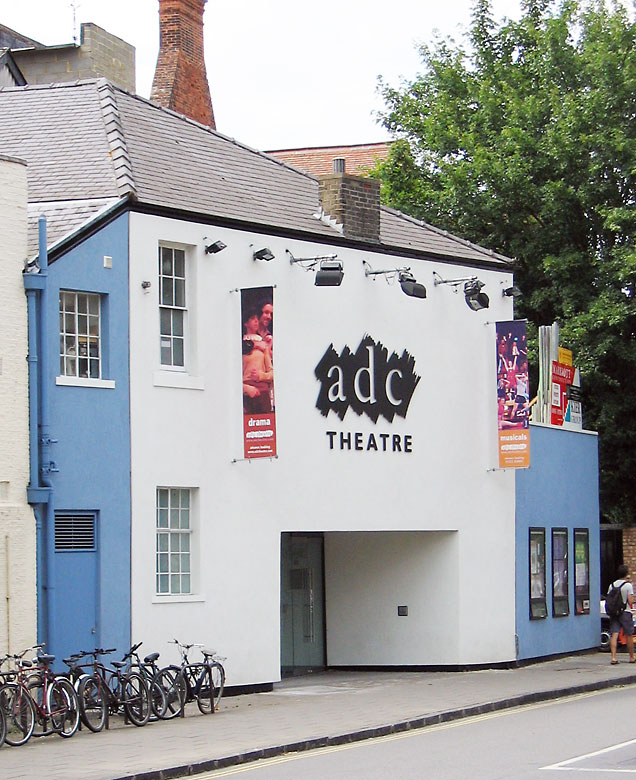
The facade of the theatre

The ADC Theatre (full name: Amateur Dramatic Club Theatre) is a theatre in Cambridge, England, and also a department of the University of Cambridge. Located on Park Street, north off Jesus Lane, it is the oldest university playhouse in Great Britain.

The theatre is owned by a trust on behalf of the Cambridge University Amateur Dramatic Club (CUADC) but leased to the University, operating as one of the smallest departments and run by six full-time staff members. It is a producing theatre with CUADC as its resident company.

The auditorium seats a maximum of 228 audience members in rows of 14, except for the back row which seats 18, though typical configurations generally seat slightly fewer than this. The front row is accessible step-free from the street via a passenger lift. The theatre has a bar, which opens 45 minutes before shows and often stays open into the early hours of the morning. The bar is famous for its cocktails themed around the current week's show.

The ADC Theatre is notable for its very unusual safety curtain which rises up from the floor, rather than falling down from the fly tower as is common in almost all other theatres.

== History ==
When CUADC was formed in 1855, its performances took place in rented rooms in the Hoop Hotel on Jesus Lane. By 1882, the Club's members had raised sufficient funds to buy the freehold. This building was subsequently developed into the ADC Theatre over an extended period of time. There was a disastrous fire in 1933, which gutted the building. The theatre was quickly rebuilt to a design by Harold Tomlinson and W. P. Dyson, reopening in 1935. The building was not changed again substantially until the redevelopment programme that started in 2002.

The theatre was run by CUADC until the club ran into financial difficulties in 1974 when the University of Cambridge began to lease the premises and run the theatre, an arrangement that continues to this day. A trust was set up to legally own the theatre with the members of CUADC being its beneficiaries.

Many famous actors and comedians acted in the theatre at the start of their careers, including Sir Ian McKellen, Tony Church, Emma Thompson, Marius Goring, Sir Derek Jacobi, Dan Stevens, Rebecca Hall, Stephen Fry, Hugh Laurie, Hattie Morahan, Tom Hollander, Tilda Swinton, Jan Ravens, Julie Covington, Tom Hiddleston, Eddie Redmayne, Richard Ayoade, Ellie Nunn, Liam Williams, David Mitchell, Robert Webb, Phil Wang, Simon Bird, Joe Thomas and Emma Corrin. Among famous directors to have gained early experience there are Sir Peter Hall, Sir Trevor Nunn and Sir Sam Mendes. Viral comedian Ken Cheng performed multiple times at the ADC Theatre in his early career.

In 2011, the ADC Theatre took over the management of the Corpus Playroom, the theatre space of Corpus Christi College, Cambridge.

== Redevelopment ==
In 2002, a redevelopment appeal was launched to improve the building. The bar had been refurbished in summer 2000, prior to the appeal being launched.

=== Phase 1 ===
In summer 2003, the first phase of the redevelopment was undertaken. This phase resulted in no visible change to the theatre's facilities as it consisted of necessary groundwork to underpin the building and move services such as water and gas in preparation for the next phase.

In 2004, the major modifications to the public areas of the theatre were undertaken. A new toilet block was constructed on an area that was part of the theatre's yard. A large amount of the ground floor was remodelled, resulting in an enlarged foyer and new box office for the public, and new management offices, clubroom, production office and backstage kitchen. The theatre's facade was also completely changed.

=== Phase 2 ===
In summer 2005, a lift was installed to give disabled access to the bar and auditorium. In addition, a corridor was constructed to give audience access to both sides of the auditorium. A bar extension and bar roof terrace were constructed on top of the toilet block built in the previous phase. The installation of the lift meant that the previous ladder access to the lighting and sound boxes could no longer be used. The lighting and sound boxes were rebuilt to allow access to them from the lift.

Latter work during the summer of 2008 concentrated on the backstage areas: new dressing rooms, a new set workshop, a rehearsal room and a green room. Offices for the Theatre's full-time staff and resources for those producing shows were rearranged and expanded. Additionally, the auditorium floor was rebuilt and new seating installed, increasing audience comfort and providing a better view of the stage from all seats.

The Theatre reopened after the final phase in October 2008 with a Gala Celebration event, at which a number of theatre alumni were present including Peter Hall and Trevor Nunn.

== Subsequent renovation ==
In the summer of 2018, the theatre again closed for renovations, the most substantial of which was the re-roofing of the auditorium and replacement of the auditorium ceiling. Mechanical ventilation and new seating was installed, a small extension was made to office space and additional points above the auditorium for rigging lights were installed. A number of electrical services were also replaced including the fitting of several new mains electricity distribution boards and new dimmers.

== Shows ==
During the term-time of Cambridge University, there are normally two shows per night: a Mainshow starting at 7:45pm, and a Lateshow starting at 11pm. On Tuesdays, the late slot is normally filled by a one-night show that can range from comedy (such as Smokers produced by the Cambridge Footlights) to "fringe" drama such as original writing. This format is subject to change and notably performances often take place in the theatre bar on Sunday evenings.

Outside term-time, the theatre often holds one show per week, and closes for periods during the summer and, to a lesser extent, the Christmas and Easter holidays. These closures allow essential maintenance work to be undertaken in the theatre.

The theatre is also known for "The Freshers Plays", produced by those who have never taken part in a production before as a Cambridge student, usually performed on the 6th week of Michaelmas Term.

== Groups that frequently use the theatre ==
During term-time, Cambridge University drama societies such as CUADC, Footlights and CUMTS use the theatre, as well as college drama societies.

Outside term-time, the theatre is typically used by drama societies based in the city of Cambridge such as BAWDS, the Combined Actors of Cambridge, the Pied Pipers and the Festival Players.
