= Footlights =

Student comedy troupe in Cambridge, UK

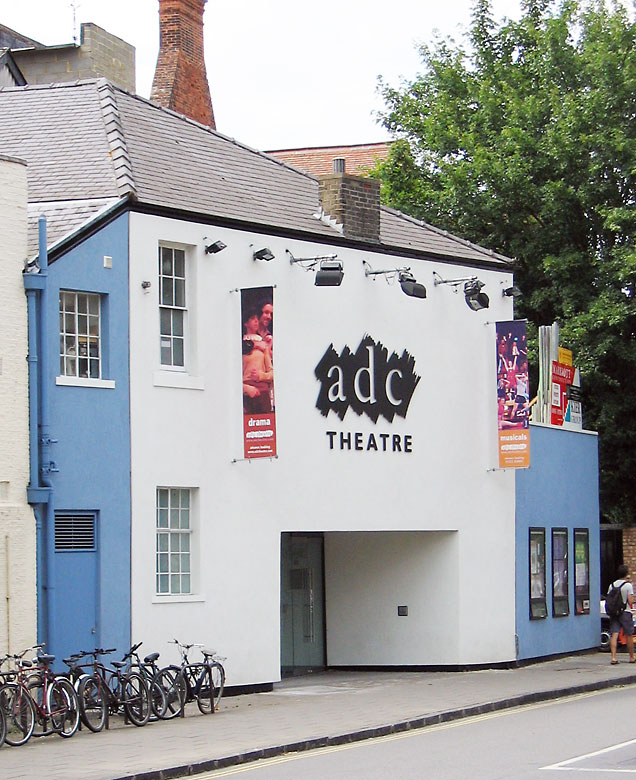
- The ADC Theatre is the home of the Footlights.
- Formation: 1883; 143 years ago
- Type: Theatre group
- Location: University of Cambridge, Cambridge, England
- Website: cambridgefootlights.org

The Cambridge Footlights, commonly referred to simply as Footlights, is a student sketch comedy troupe located in Cambridge, England. Footlights was founded in 1883, and is one of Britain's oldest student sketch comedy troupes. The comedy society is run by the students of the University of Cambridge.

== History ==
Footlights' inaugural performance took place in June 1883. For some months before the name "Footlights" was chosen, the group had performed to local audiences in the Cambridge area (once, with a cricket match included, at the "pauper lunatic asylum"). They wished to go wider than the Cambridge University Amateur Dramatic Club (ADC), founded in 1855, with its membership drawn largely from Trinity College, and its theatre seating only 100. They were to perform every May Week at the Theatre Royal, Barnwell, Cambridge, the shows soon open to the public. A local paper commended the club's appeal to the "general public, the many different classes of which life in Cambridge is made up".

The club grew in prominence in the 1960s as a hotbed of comedy and satire, and established a permanent home in the basement of the Cambridge Union. Having established a tradition of performing at the annual Edinburgh Festival Fringe, the club entered the mainstream when its members formed half of Beyond the Fringe, the hugely popular stage revue which toured Britain and America in 1960. The 1963 revue then followed in the footsteps of Beyond the Fringe, appearing in Edinburgh and London's West End, before travelling to New Zealand and the United States, where it made appearances on Broadway and The Ed Sullivan Show and received a full-page review in Time.

The first woman to be given full membership was Germaine Greer. She joined in October 1964 on the same day as Clive James and Russell Davies. There had been women before that time who had been allowed to join in, including Eleanor Bron in the late 1950s, but Greer was the first to be billed as a full member. Apparently Tim Brooke-Taylor was instrumental in having women admitted. She was part of the Footlights' 1965 revue My Girl Herbert.

Over the next decade, Footlights members came to dominate British comedy in the 1970s, creating and starring in shows such as Not Only... But Also, I'm Sorry, I'll Read That Again, At Last the 1948 Show, That Was the Week That Was and The Hitchhiker's Guide To The Galaxy, forming comedy groups such as Monty Python and The Goodies, and generally fuelling the satire boom. During the 1980s, Footlights reinforced its position at the heart of British comedy. The 1981 revue, featuring Emma Thompson, Hugh Laurie, Stephen Fry, Tony Slattery, Penny Dwyer and Paul Shearer, won the inaugural Perrier Award at the Edinburgh Fringe Festival and spawned Fry and Laurie, the first in a long line of popular and successful double acts formed at the club including Armstrong and Miller and Mitchell and Webb. Their revue, The Cellar Tapes, at St Mary Street Hall was billed as "the annual revue: one of the strongest casts for several years, has already toured in southern England with great success."

Former members have gone on to win Oscars, BAFTAs and other awards and enjoy success in the entertainment industry.

== Activities ==
During term, Footlights produce the regular "Smokers"—an informal mixture of sketches and stand-up—at the ADC Theatre. The club also produces the annual Pantomime (in collaboration with ADC) and the Spring Revue, as well as staging the winning entry of the Footlights Harry Porter Prize; a competition in which any student at the university may enter a one-hour comic play. The Footlights International Tour Show takes place from June until October, and travels to Cambridge, London, Edinburgh and venues across the United States. For information about individual Footlights revues, see Cambridge Footlights Revue.

== Membership ==
Potential members apply to the organization at two times during the year, once at the end of the university's Lent term and the other at the beginning of the university's Michaelmas term. Students who study at the University of Cambridge and Anglia Ruskin University are able to apply for membership. Students must be at least in the third year or above in their undergraduate studies to apply for membership. Postgraduate students are also eligible to apply to be members of the Footlights comedy society.

== Former members ==
This is a list of former members of Footlights who achieved notability after graduating from the University of Cambridge.

== Presidents ==
The elected leader of the University of Cambridge Footlights Dramatic Club is known as the president, who is assisted by a vice-president, treasurer, archivist and several other posts to form the committee.

Notable past presidents have included the following:

- Peter Cook (of Beyond the Fringe, Pete and Dud and Not Only... But Also)
- Tim Brooke-Taylor (of The Goodies, I'm Sorry, I'll Read That Again and I'm Sorry I Haven't a Clue)
- Graeme Garden (of The Goodies, I'm Sorry, I'll Read That Again and I'm Sorry I Haven't a Clue)
- Eric Idle (of Monty Python)
- Clive James (author of Cultural Amnesia and Unreliable Memoirs)
- Clive Anderson (of Whose Line Is It Anyway?)
- Jan Ravens (of Dead Ringers), the first female president
- Hugh Laurie (of Fry and Laurie, Jeeves and Wooster and House)
- Tony Slattery (of Whose Line Is It Anyway?)
- Neil Mullarkey (of Austin Powers)
- Sue Perkins (of The Great British Bake Off and Mel and Sue)
- David Mitchell (of That Mitchell and Webb Look and Peep Show)
- Robert Thorogood (creator of BBC One's Death in Paradise)
- Richard Ayoade (of Garth Marenghi's Darkplace and The IT Crowd)
- Simon Bird (of The Inbetweeners and Friday Night Dinner)
- Phil Wang (of Daphne Sounds Expensive), comedian

=== List of presidents ===
- 1886 – F. W. Mortimer
- 1887 – J. J. Withers
- 1890 – Oscar Browning
- 1891 – C. M. Rae
- 1892 – Oscar Browning
- 1894 – Oscar Browning
- 1895 – Oscar Browning
- 1896 – H. C. Pollitt
- 1897 – H. C. Pollitt
- 1898 – M. V. Leveaux
- 1899 – S. W. Burgess
- 1900 – O. J. Goedecker
- 1901 – R. J. White
- 1902 – E. K. Fordham
- 1904 – G. S. Heathcote
- 1905 – G. S. Heathcote
- 1906 – H. Rottenburg
- 1907 – H. Rottenburg
- 1908 – J. S. Murray
- 1909 – L. B. Tillard
- 1910 – A. R. Inglis
- 1911 – A. R. Inglis
- 1912 – P. D. Ravenscroft
- 1913 – C. A. A. Douglas Hamilton
- 1914 – M. Cutherston
- 1919 – B. D. Nicholson
- 1920 – B. D. Nicholson
- 1921 – M. D. Lyon
- 1922 – M. D. Lyon
- 1923 – F. E. Powell
- 1924 – J. A. C. Barradale
- 1925 – H. J. Warrender
- 1926 – J. D. Houison Craufurd
- 1927 – H. C. Martineau
- 1928 – H. E. R. Mitchell
- 1929 – J. Fell Clark
- 1930 – J. C. Byrom
- 1931 – R. S. Hill
- 1932 – P. E. Lyon
- 1933 – J. A. Coates
- 1934 – Lord Killanin
- 1935 – Harry Lee
- 1936 – Peter Crane
- 1937 – Albert E. P. Robison
- 1938 – P. B. Meyer
- 1939 – Sir Robert Ricketts, Bt.
- 1947 – D. C. Orders
- 1948 – D. C. Orders
- 1949 – Simon Phipps
- 1950 – Adrian Vale
- 1951 – Ian Kellie
- 1952 – Andrew Davidson
- 1953 – Peter Firth
- 1954 – Leslie Bricusse
- 1955 – Brian Marber
- 1956 – Tim Berington
- 1957 – Allan Mitchell
- 1958 – Peter Stroud
- 1959 – Adrian Slade
- 1960 – Peter Cook
- 1961 – Peter Bellwood
- 1962 – Robert Atkins
- 1963 – Tim Brooke-Taylor
- 1964 – Graeme Garden
- 1965 – Eric Idle
- 1966 – Andrew Mayer
- 1967 – Clive James
- 1968 – Jonathan James-Moore
- 1969 – Barry Brown
- 1970 – Adrian Edwards
- 1971 – Richard MacKenna
- 1972 – Steve Thorn
- 1973 – Robert Benton
- 1974 – Jon Canter
- 1975 – Clive Anderson
- 1976 – Chris Keightley
- 1977 – Jimmy Mulville
- 1978 – Martin Bergman
- 1979 – Robert Bathurst
- 1980 – Jan Ravens
- 1981 – Hugh Laurie
- 1982 – Tony Slattery
- 1983 – Neil Mullarkey
- 1984 – Nick Hancock
- 1985 – Kathryn Crew
- 1986 – Nick Golson
- 1987 – Tim Scott
- 1988 – Peter Bradshaw
- 1989 – Roland Kenyon
- 1990 – Henry Naylor
- 1991 – Sue Perkins
- 1992 – Dan Gaster
- 1993 – Mark Evans
- 1994 – Robert Thorogood
- 1995 – Charlie Hartill
- 1996 – David Mitchell
- 1997 – Sarah Moule
- 1998 – Richard Ayoade
- 1999 – Kevin Baker
- 2000 – Matt Green
- 2001 – James Morris
- 2002 – Ed Weeks
- 2003 – Stefan Golaszewski
- 2004 – Ed Riches
- 2005 – Raph Shirley
- 2006 – Simon Bird
- 2007 – Will Sharpe
- 2008 – Sam Sword
- 2009 – Alastair Roberts
- 2010 – Abi Tedder
- 2011 – Mark Fiddaman
- 2012 – Phil Wang
- 2013 – Harry Michell
- 2014 – Ben Pope
- 2015 – Thomas Roper Fraser
- 2016 – Oliver Taylor
- 2017 – Dillon Mapletoft
- 2018 – Ruby Keane
- 2019 – No president; committee-led
- 2020 – Jade Franks
- 2021 – Adedamola Laoye
- 2022 – Ayush Prasad
- 2023 – Niamh Howat
- 2024 – Margaret Saunderson
- 2025 – James Allen
- 2026 – Freya Bielby

== Notable incidents ==
Comedian Tim Key was a member of the Cambridge Footlights, despite not being a student at Cambridge University. He famously bluffed his way into a production of Treasure Island, written by Alex Horne, by posing as a PhD candidate at the university. He performed in two other shows with the Footlights, during which he met Stefan Golaszewski and Tom Basden.

== See also ==
- Cambridge University Amateur Dramatic Club
- Cambridge University Light Entertainment Society
- The Oxford Revue
