= List of Horrible Histories (2009 TV series) episodes =

Horrible Histories is a children's live-action historical and musical sketch-comedy TV series based on the book series of the same name written by Terry Deary. It ran for 70 episodes and 4 specials from 2009-2014 before being rebooted in 2015 with a new cast and format.

The series producer was Caroline Norris. Series 1 was directed by Chloe Thomas and Steve Connelly, with all future series directed by Connelly and Dominic Brigstocke. Writers are listed as per credits of each episode. Original music was—except where noted—written by Richie Webb (music) and Dave Cohen (lyrics), with instrumentals by Webb. The songs were not given formal titles; where possible their creators' names for them have been used.

The starring troop over all five series consisted of Mathew Baynton, Simon Farnaby, Martha Howe-Douglas, Jim Howick, Laurence Rickard, Ben Willbond and Sarah Hadland, some combination of whom appear, with very rare exceptions, in every live-action sketch; their voices can also be heard in the animated sketches. Supporting cast was headed by Alice Lowe, Lawry Lewin and Dominique Moore.

Notable guest stars are indicated in the episode in which they appear, or in the case of recurring roles, on first appearance. Several sketches incorporate parodies of other UK pop-culture media and/or personalities; these parody inspirations are likewise indicated on first appearance.

On 24 October 2024 it was announced that Horrible Histories would be presented with a BAFTA Special Award. The honour was awarded in recognition of Horrible Histories' extraordinary cultural and social impact.

== Series overview ==
Series	Episodes	Originally released	
Series	Episodes	First released	Last released
1	13	16 April 2009	9 July 2009
2	14 (See the last one in "Specials")	31 May 2010	27 July 2010
3	13	30 May 2011	26 July 2011
4	15 (See the last two in "Specials")	9 April 2012	4 June 2012
5	15 (See the last two in "Specials")	27 May 2013	23 July 2013
Specials	4	17 December 2010	4 August 2014

== Episodes ==
=== Series 1 (2009) ===
No.	Title	Written by	Segments	Summary	Original release date
101	"Series 1, Episode 1"	Lucy Clarke, Dave Cohen, Susie Donkin, Jon Holmes, Ben Ward	"Rotten Romans"	The pre-gladiatorial custom of staging fights at funerals. Imagine spot: High school for aspiring gladiators.	16 April 2009
101	"Series 1, Episode 1"	Lucy Clarke, Dave Cohen, Susie Donkin, Jon Holmes, Ben Ward	"Frightful First World War"	Lice wars (partly animated).	16 April 2009
101	"Series 1, Episode 1"	Lucy Clarke, Dave Cohen, Susie Donkin, Jon Holmes, Ben Ward	"Ready Steady Feast"	German wartime food substitutes (parody of Ready Steady Cook).	16 April 2009
101	"Series 1, Episode 1"	Lucy Clarke, Dave Cohen, Susie Donkin, Jon Holmes, Ben Ward	"Putrid Pirates"	The Black Spot. Captain Black Bart lists off his rules to the new recruits.	16 April 2009
101	"Series 1, Episode 1"	Lucy Clarke, Dave Cohen, Susie Donkin, Jon Holmes, Ben Ward	"Savage Stone Age"	Stone Age Tool Set (advertisement). The (not-so-)carefully reconstructed funeral of a tribal chief.	16 April 2009
101	"Series 1, Episode 1"	Lucy Clarke, Dave Cohen, Susie Donkin, Jon Holmes, Ben Ward	"Vicious Vikings"	Video game: Warrior! Viking vs Monk. "Historical hairdressers" Ear spoons.	16 April 2009
101	"Series 1, Episode 1"	Lucy Clarke, Dave Cohen, Susie Donkin, Jon Holmes, Ben Ward	"Gorgeous Georgians"	Special guest Meera Syal is the storyteller of Twisted Fairytales: "The Three Little Pigs" (window tax). How to vote in Georgian elections.	16 April 2009
Song: Gorgeous Georgians - "The 4 Georges: Born 2 Rule" (boyband parody). Lyrics by Dave Cohen with additional lyrics by Laurence Rickard and Caroline Norris. Performed by Ben Willbond, Mathew Baynton, Simon Farnaby and Jim Howick.
102	"Series 1, Episode 2"	Mark Blakewill, Lucy Clarke, James Harris, George Poles, Steve Punt, George Sawyer and Ben Ward	"Measly Middle Ages"	Shouty Man: New! Pee-sil Non-Bio Laundry Detergent (two parts, parody of Persil). City officials discuss how to curb defecating out of windows--while walking below them.	23 April 2009
102	"Series 1, Episode 2"	Mark Blakewill, Lucy Clarke, James Harris, George Poles, Steve Punt, George Sawyer and Ben Ward	"Savage Stone Age"	"Historical Hospital": Tattoo and trepanning treatments. Caveman Art Show: Preserving the head of a dead relative.	23 April 2009
102	"Series 1, Episode 2"	Mark Blakewill, Lucy Clarke, James Harris, George Poles, Steve Punt, George Sawyer and Ben Ward	"Woeful Second World War"	Mary, the heroic carrier pigeon (animated). The commandant of a German POW camp tries to keep a determined British officer from escaping.	23 April 2009
102	"Series 1, Episode 2"	Mark Blakewill, Lucy Clarke, James Harris, George Poles, Steve Punt, George Sawyer and Ben Ward	"Slimy Stuarts"	Stupid Deaths: Francis Bacon. "My Stuart Family" tries to keep up with the neighbors with the help of some exotic new foods.	23 April 2009
102	"Series 1, Episode 2"	Mark Blakewill, Lucy Clarke, James Harris, George Poles, Steve Punt, George Sawyer and Ben Ward	"Awful Egyptians"	King Pepi II's Super Sticky Anti-Fly Honey Slave (advertisement). Imagine spot: An over-entitled pharaoh insists on the invention of the pyramid. Twisted Fairytales: "The Princess and the Pea" (eliminating rivals to the throne).	23 April 2009
102	"Series 1, Episode 2"	Mark Blakewill, Lucy Clarke, James Harris, George Poles, Steve Punt, George Sawyer and Ben Ward	"Terrible Tudors"	"This Is Your Reign": King Henry VIII reunites with his friends, advisors and wives--too bad he's had most of them executed (parody of This Is Your Life).	23 April 2009
Song: Terrible Tudors - "The Wives of Henry VIII: Divorced Beheaded & Died". Lyrics by Terry Deary. Performed by Ben Willbond.
103	"Series 1, Episode 3"	Mark Blakewill, James Harris, Jon Holmes, Steve Punt, Ben Ward and Arnold Widdowson	"Wicked Witches"	Let a random old lady take the blame for your bad luck with Witchfinder's Direct (infomercial). Twisted Fairytales: "The Frog Prince" (witchcraft). The Middle Ages (Witch)Craft Show demonstrates how accusations can also be used to get revenge.	30 April 2009
103	"Series 1, Episode 3"	Mark Blakewill, James Harris, Jon Holmes, Steve Punt, Ben Ward and Arnold Widdowson	"Vicious Vikings"	Top Three Weird Viking Beliefs: the origin of the first man and woman, who holds the sky up and the story of Thor searching for his stolen hammer (partially animated). Asgot the Clumsy attempts to bluff his way into Valhalla--to avoid the Viking equivalent of hell.	30 April 2009
103	"Series 1, Episode 3"	Mark Blakewill, James Harris, Jon Holmes, Steve Punt, Ben Ward and Arnold Widdowson	"Potty Pioneers"	Captain Robert Scott is well-prepared for his disastrous race to the South Pole. Stupid Deaths: Franz Reichelt.	30 April 2009
103	"Series 1, Episode 3"	Mark Blakewill, James Harris, Jon Holmes, Steve Punt, Ben Ward and Arnold Widdowson	"Awful Egyptians"	A picky widow chooses a mummification style for her husband. Shouty Man: New! All-Purpose Ancient Egyptian Mummy.	30 April 2009
103	"Series 1, Episode 3"	Mark Blakewill, James Harris, Jon Holmes, Steve Punt, Ben Ward and Arnold Widdowson	"Rotten Romans"	Nero uses Christians as candles. Imagine spot: HHTV Sport: Lions vs Christians.	30 April 2009
103	"Series 1, Episode 3"	Mark Blakewill, James Harris, Jon Holmes, Steve Punt, Ben Ward and Arnold Widdowson	"Slimy Stuarts"	HHTV News: Charles I's execution. "Historical Wife Swap": The Miserables, a Puritan family, swap with Cavalier family the Merrys post-Restoration (parody of Wife Swap).	30 April 2009
Song: Awful Egyptians - "Making a Mummy". Performed by Jim Howick.
104	"Series 1, Episode 4"	Dave Cohen, Greg Jenner, Jon Holmes, Steve Punt and Ben Ward	"Smashing Saxons"	"Saxon EastEnders" finds a ruler trying to mediate a family feud via the new Weregeld law (parody of EastEnders). A paranormal researcher attempts to locate the source of a haunting in "Anglo-Saxon Ghost Hunt" (parody of Ghost Hunt).	7 May 2009
104	"Series 1, Episode 4"	Dave Cohen, Greg Jenner, Jon Holmes, Steve Punt and Ben Ward	"Vile Victorians"	"Ready Steady Feast": Dr William Buckland, famed eater of weird things--including the preserved heart of a king. Stupid Deaths: Matthew Webb.	7 May 2009
104	"Series 1, Episode 4"	Dave Cohen, Greg Jenner, Jon Holmes, Steve Punt and Ben Ward	"Frightful First World War"	TNT Hair Dye (advertisement). Dodgy War Inventions No. 16: Zeppelin airship (animated).	7 May 2009
104	"Series 1, Episode 4"	Dave Cohen, Greg Jenner, Jon Holmes, Steve Punt and Ben Ward	"Groovy Greeks"	"Historical Hospital": Hippocrates demonstrates his unorthodox diagnostic techniques. Alexander the Great and his adviser Hephaestion debate whether or not to name yet another city Alexandria.	7 May 2009
104	"Series 1, Episode 4"	Dave Cohen, Greg Jenner, Jon Holmes, Steve Punt and Ben Ward	"Rotten Romans"	HHTV News: Bob Hale's Roman Report touches on the Year of the Five Emperors and the Six emperors in 238 CE. Caligula tries improving his image with the help of a speechwriter.	7 May 2009
104	"Series 1, Episode 4"	Dave Cohen, Greg Jenner, Jon Holmes, Steve Punt and Ben Ward	"Terrible Tudors	Elizabeth I's habit of nicknaming her courtiers. Oh Yea! Magazine: Execution Special.	7 May 2009
Song: Terrible Tudors - "Terrible Tudors" (Madness pastiche). Performed by Martha Howe-Douglas and Ben Willbond.
105	"Series 1, Episode 5"	Mark Blakewill, James Harris, Jon Holmes, George Poles, Steve Punt and Arnold Widdowson	"Awful Egyptians"	Pharaoh Phashion magazine offers beauty tips for peasants and aristocrats (advertisement). Mouse Fresh Max toothpaste (advertisement).	14 May 2009
105	"Series 1, Episode 5"	Mark Blakewill, James Harris, Jon Holmes, George Poles, Steve Punt and Arnold Widdowson	"Ruthless Rulers"	Louis XI and the Pig Piano, with special guest Simon Cowell (animated).	14 May 2009
105	"Series 1, Episode 5"	Mark Blakewill, James Harris, Jon Holmes, George Poles, Steve Punt and Arnold Widdowson	"Measly Middle Ages"	HHTV News: taking a census for the Domesday Book. William the Conqueror's increasingly unusual funeral.	14 May 2009
105	"Series 1, Episode 5"	Mark Blakewill, James Harris, Jon Holmes, George Poles, Steve Punt and Arnold Widdowson	"Rotten Romans"	Caligula declares war against Poseidon, god of the sea.	14 May 2009
105	"Series 1, Episode 5"	Mark Blakewill, James Harris, Jon Holmes, George Poles, Steve Punt and Arnold Widdowson	"Savage Stone Age"	HHTV News: Bob Hale's Stone Age Report. Imagine spot: A "Homo sapiens" couple invite the local Neanderthals to dinner.	14 May 2009
105	"Series 1, Episode 5"	Mark Blakewill, James Harris, Jon Holmes, George Poles, Steve Punt and Arnold Widdowson	"Smashing Saxons"	"Court of Historical Law": Ethelred the Unready determines a horse thief's guilt via ordeal by cake. Twisted Fairytales: "Goldilocks and the Three Bears" (Saxon punishments).	14 May 2009
105	"Series 1, Episode 5"	Mark Blakewill, James Harris, Jon Holmes, George Poles, Steve Punt and Arnold Widdowson	"Gorgeous Georgians"	Join the Georgian Navy! (advertisement). "Historical Hospital": 'Master of medicaments' Montague Fuzzlepeck diagnoses a patient.	14 May 2009
Song: No song is included in this episode (for the only time in series history).
106	"Series 1, Episode 6"	Greg Jenner, Simon Littlefield, Laurence Rickard, George Sawyer and Ben Ward	"Measly Middle Ages"	A hapless thief tries to mug a flagellant. Highlights from a typical medieval bestiary are spotlighted on "The Made-Up Planet" (animated).	21 May 2009
106	"Series 1, Episode 6"	Greg Jenner, Simon Littlefield, Laurence Rickard, George Sawyer and Ben Ward	"Vile Victorians"	Be an exploited child labourer and get absolutely no compensation from Victorian Claims Direct (advertisement). A chimney sweep and his young apprentice face unexpected obstacles on the job.	21 May 2009
106	"Series 1, Episode 6"	Greg Jenner, Simon Littlefield, Laurence Rickard, George Sawyer and Ben Ward	"Gorgeous Georgians"	"Historical Wife Swap": Lord and Lady Posh from the Manor swap with the Peasant family of Poorville.	21 May 2009
106	"Series 1, Episode 6"	Greg Jenner, Simon Littlefield, Laurence Rickard, George Sawyer and Ben Ward	"Rotten Romans"	Imagine spot: Things to remember when you're a galley slave (parody of airline passenger announcements. Two parts). Dodgy War Inventions No. 7: the Onager (animated).	21 May 2009
106	"Series 1, Episode 6"	Greg Jenner, Simon Littlefield, Laurence Rickard, George Sawyer and Ben Ward	"Frightful First World War"	Twisted Fairytales: "The Old Woman Who Lived in a Shoe" (urinating on boots to soften the leather). A soldier's frantic hunt for his lucky charms might prove lucky itself.	21 May 2009
106	"Series 1, Episode 6"	Greg Jenner, Simon Littlefield, Laurence Rickard, George Sawyer and Ben Ward	"Groovy Greeks"	"Chat show "Greek Myth Talk" tells the lurid story of Kronos and his attempt at filicide.	21 May 2009
Song: Gorgeous Georgians - "A Gorgeous Georgian Lady". Lyrics by Terry Deary (adapted from his book "Gorgeous Georgians"). Performed by Martha Howe-Douglas.
107	"Series 1, Episode 7"	Toby Davies, Susie Donkin, Jon Holmes, Chris Pell and Ben Ward	"Terrible Tudors"	Oh Yea! Magazine: Royal Special. "Historical Hospital": Treating a blister rapidly turns fatal.	28 May 2009
107	"Series 1, Episode 7"	Toby Davies, Susie Donkin, Jon Holmes, Chris Pell and Ben Ward	"Groovy Greeks"	The story of Helen of Troy retold as inner-city melodrama, complete with chav accents. Imagine spot: Smuggling the Trojan horse past the guards--apparently, much simpler than you'd think.	28 May 2009
107	"Series 1, Episode 7"	Toby Davies, Susie Donkin, Jon Holmes, Chris Pell and Ben Ward	"Measly Middle Ages"	"That Was Entertainment!": Jousting on ice and other peculiar past-time fun.	28 May 2009
107	"Series 1, Episode 7"	Toby Davies, Susie Donkin, Jon Holmes, Chris Pell and Ben Ward	"Woeful Second World War"	Twisted Fairytales: "Cinderella" (rationing clothes). Fake nylon stockings made with gravy and eye-liner (advertisement).	28 May 2009
107	"Series 1, Episode 7"	Toby Davies, Susie Donkin, Jon Holmes, Chris Pell and Ben Ward	"Awful Egyptians"	Imagine spot: Selling pyramid real estate. Meet the Egyptian gods (animated).	28 May 2009
107	"Series 1, Episode 7"	Toby Davies, Susie Donkin, Jon Holmes, Chris Pell and Ben Ward	"Vile Victorians"	Imagine spot: A little girl must wash in dirty water. Parliamentarians try to find a solution to--or at least, a way to ignore--the Great Stink of 1858.	28 May 2009
Song: Measly Middle Ages - "I'm a Knight" (Monty Python pastiche). Performed by Mathew Baynton, Steve Punt and Jim Howick.
108	"Series 1, Episode 8"	Lucy Clarke, Dave Cohen, Susie Donkin, Jon Holmes, Greg Jenner, Simon Littlefield, George Poles, Steve Punt and Ben Ward	"Vicious Vikings"	Stupid Deaths: Edmund II. Valhalla Tours: Come to England for the burning and pillaging, stay for the plunder!	4 June 2009
108	"Series 1, Episode 8"	Lucy Clarke, Dave Cohen, Susie Donkin, Jon Holmes, Greg Jenner, Simon Littlefield, George Poles, Steve Punt and Ben Ward	"Savage Stone Age"	"Ready Steady Feast": Sampling the best in cave foods.	4 June 2009
108	"Series 1, Episode 8"	Lucy Clarke, Dave Cohen, Susie Donkin, Jon Holmes, Greg Jenner, Simon Littlefield, George Poles, Steve Punt and Ben Ward	"Rotten Romans"	Fearsome Gaulish leader Vercingetorix is unexpectedly stymied by bad weather in "The Battle of Avaricum" (movie trailer). The invention of decimation as a military punishment by General Pompey.	4 June 2009
108	"Series 1, Episode 8"	Lucy Clarke, Dave Cohen, Susie Donkin, Jon Holmes, Greg Jenner, Simon Littlefield, George Poles, Steve Punt and Ben Ward	"Smashing Saxons"	"Historical Hairdressers": Hair treatments. Holiday presents demonstrate the many useful uses of dung.	4 June 2009
108	"Series 1, Episode 8"	Lucy Clarke, Dave Cohen, Susie Donkin, Jon Holmes, Greg Jenner, Simon Littlefield, George Poles, Steve Punt and Ben Ward	"Gorgeous Georgians"	This is Georgian Food (parody of Marks & Spencer advertisements). A Georgian dentist prepares to replace a tooth.	4 June 2009
108	"Series 1, Episode 8"	Lucy Clarke, Dave Cohen, Susie Donkin, Jon Holmes, Greg Jenner, Simon Littlefield, George Poles, Steve Punt and Ben Ward	"Frightful First World War"	Outlining the causes of the war as simply as possible - that is, not very. The evolution of the fighter plane (animated).	4 June 2009
108	"Series 1, Episode 8"	Lucy Clarke, Dave Cohen, Susie Donkin, Jon Holmes, Greg Jenner, Simon Littlefield, George Poles, Steve Punt and Ben Ward	"Measly Middle Ages"	The Peasant's Revolt is led by the confusingly named Wat Tyler. The rules of chivalry, and more importantly how to find the loopholes.	4 June 2009
Song: Savage Stone Age - "Caveman Love" (1950's doo-wop parody). Performed by Susie Donkin and Sarah Hadland, with Jim Howick, Ben Willbond and Mathew Baynton.
109	"Series 1, Episode 9"	Dave Cohen, Jon Holmes, Steve Punt and Ben Ward	"Terrible Tudors"	Weather forecast. Twisted Fairytales: "Thumbelina" (dirty streets)	11 June 2009
109	"Series 1, Episode 9"	Dave Cohen, Jon Holmes, Steve Punt and Ben Ward	"Vile Victorians"	Shouty Man: New! Victorian Child Chimney Cleaner. An inspector gets a rundown from strict teachers on school punishments.	11 June 2009
109	"Series 1, Episode 9"	Dave Cohen, Jon Holmes, Steve Punt and Ben Ward	"Rotten Romans"	Make all your wishes come true (sort of) with Roman Gods Direct. A general tries desperately to appease all the right gods prior to battle.	11 June 2009
109	"Series 1, Episode 9"	Dave Cohen, Jon Holmes, Steve Punt and Ben Ward	"Vicious Vikings"	Words We Get From the: Vikings. Debunking the myth of horned helmets (animated).	11 June 2009
109	"Series 1, Episode 9"	Dave Cohen, Jon Holmes, Steve Punt and Ben Ward	"Groovy Greeks"	"Historical Wife Swap": Effete Athenians vs. legendarily tough Spartans.	11 June 2009
109	"Series 1, Episode 9"	Dave Cohen, Jon Holmes, Steve Punt and Ben Ward	"Slimy Stuarts"	HHTV News: Mike Peabody reports on efforts to cope with the Great Plague of London. Ye Sun newspaper: Plague Special. (Parody of The Sun newspaper.) "Ready Steady Feast": How to start the Great Fire of London.	11 June 2009
Song: Terrible Teachers - "It's Not True!". Performed by Mathew Baynton and Martha Howe-Douglas.
110	"Series 1, Episode 10"	Susie Donkin, Steve Punt, Mark Shillabeer, Ben Ward and Arnold Widdowson	"Rotten Romans"	Sponge on a Stick and Viper Deodorant (advertisements).	18 June 2009
110	"Series 1, Episode 10"	Susie Donkin, Steve Punt, Mark Shillabeer, Ben Ward and Arnold Widdowson	"Vile Victorians"	An upper-class couple are conned by a thief using street slang. Great Victorian Inventions: The Car (animated).	18 June 2009
110	"Series 1, Episode 10"	Susie Donkin, Steve Punt, Mark Shillabeer, Ben Ward and Arnold Widdowson	"Terrible Tudors"	"Ready Steady Feast": Comparing the diets of rich and poor. "Historical Hairdressers": The latest skin treatments.	18 June 2009
110	"Series 1, Episode 10"	Susie Donkin, Steve Punt, Mark Shillabeer, Ben Ward and Arnold Widdowson	"Cut-Throat Celts"	Home decorating with severed heads. Video game: Warrior! Romans vs Celts.	18 June 2009
110	"Series 1, Episode 10"	Susie Donkin, Steve Punt, Mark Shillabeer, Ben Ward and Arnold Widdowson	"Measly Middle Ages"	Twisted Fairytales: "The Pied Piper of Hamelin" (plague spreading).	18 June 2009
110	"Series 1, Episode 10"	Susie Donkin, Steve Punt, Mark Shillabeer, Ben Ward and Arnold Widdowson	"Ruthless Rulers"	"This Is Your Reign": Napoleon Bonaparte is reunited with his rather unexpectedly accented family.	18 June 2009
110	"Series 1, Episode 10"	Susie Donkin, Steve Punt, Mark Shillabeer, Ben Ward and Arnold Widdowson	"Groovy Greeks"	Spartan warriors suit up at the weapons store pre-battle. HHTV News: Mike Peabody live from the Battle of Thermopylae.	18 June 2009
Song: Measly Middle Ages - "The Plague Song" (musical theatre parody). Lyrics by Terry Deary. Performed by Ben Willbond and Katy Wix with Mathew Baynton and Sarah Hadland.
111	"Series 1, Episode 11"	Dave Cohen, Jon Holmes, George Poles, Steve Punt & Ben Ward	"Terrible Tudors"	Oh Yea! magazine: Royal Special. Imagine spot: Choosing the next royal executioner on "The Axe Factor" (parody of The X Factor).	25 June 2009
111	"Series 1, Episode 11"	Dave Cohen, Jon Holmes, George Poles, Steve Punt & Ben Ward	"Groovy Greeks"	Stupid Deaths: General Pausanias. "Court of Historical Law": Draco imposes his truly draconian punishments on an apple thief. Twisted Fairytales: "Sleeping Beauty" (disobeying Draco's non-idleness law in particular).	25 June 2009
111	"Series 1, Episode 11"	Dave Cohen, Jon Holmes, George Poles, Steve Punt & Ben Ward	"Vile Victorians"	HHTV News: Bob Hale's British Empire Report.	25 June 2009
111	"Series 1, Episode 11"	Dave Cohen, Jon Holmes, George Poles, Steve Punt & Ben Ward	"Vicious Vikings"	Words We Get From the: Vikings. A returning warrior enthusiastically recites battle poetry to his distinctly sceptical friend.	25 June 2009
111	"Series 1, Episode 11"	Dave Cohen, Jon Holmes, George Poles, Steve Punt & Ben Ward	"Slimy Stuarts"	Bonfire safety tips with Guy Fawkes. HHTV News: The English Civil War breaks out.	25 June 2009
111	"Series 1, Episode 11"	Dave Cohen, Jon Holmes, George Poles, Steve Punt & Ben Ward	"Measly Middle Ages"	Stupid Deaths: The Grim Reaper finally gets fed up while processing the overflow of casualties from the plague, floods, Hundred Years' War etc. "Ready Steady Feast": Live from the Siege of Orléans.	25 June 2009
Song: Vile Victorians - "British Things". Performed by Sarah Hadland and Mathew Baynton.
112	"Series 1, Episode 12"	Dave Cohen, George Sawyer, Jon Holmes and Ben Ward	"Smashing Saxons"	Mealtime charades in a monastery take an unexpected turn. The Monk Art Show: How to write like a monk--if you can survive the ink-making process.	2 July 2009
112	"Series 1, Episode 12"	Dave Cohen, George Sawyer, Jon Holmes and Ben Ward	"Vile Victorians"	Schoolchildren have some very unusual names. Queen Victoria pitches her workout regime.	2 July 2009
112	"Series 1, Episode 12"	Dave Cohen, George Sawyer, Jon Holmes and Ben Ward	"Rotten Romans"	The gladiator games run out of animals at the worst possible moment. Checking in with Execution Animals "Я" Us.	2 July 2009
112	"Series 1, Episode 12"	Dave Cohen, George Sawyer, Jon Holmes and Ben Ward	"Measly Middle Ages"	Twisted Fairytales: "The Ugly Duckling" (swan hunting). The Earl of Warwick checks on preparations for his dinner party.	2 July 2009
112	"Series 1, Episode 12"	Dave Cohen, George Sawyer, Jon Holmes and Ben Ward	"Groovy Greeks"	The first play in history. Stupid Deaths: Aeschylus.	2 July 2009
112	"Series 1, Episode 12"	Dave Cohen, George Sawyer, Jon Holmes and Ben Ward	"Woeful Second World War"	A prim couple must choose from a difficult set of inner-city evacuee children. Joining the Hitler Youth--or else. Top Three Strangest Hitler Survival Rumours (animated).	2 July 2009
Song: Groovy Greeks - "We are Greek" (Flanders & Swann pastiche). Performed by Mathew Baynton and Jim Howick. (Two parts.)
113	"Series 1, Episode 13"	Dave Cohen, Jon Holmes and Ben Ward	"Rotten Romans"	A Roman chef is disgusted with the state of newly conquered Britain's cuisine on "Roman Kitchen Nightmares" (Gordon Ramsay parody). A naive visitor is forced to use Rome's (very) public communal toilets.	9 July 2009
113	"Series 1, Episode 13"	Dave Cohen, Jon Holmes and Ben Ward	"Vile Victorians"	Florence Nightingale arrives at a Crimean hospital clearly in need of her help.	9 July 2009
113	"Series 1, Episode 13"	Dave Cohen, Jon Holmes and Ben Ward	"Awful Egyptians"	"This Is Your Reign": Sorting Cleopatra's tangled family tree. The story of Hatshepsut, first female pharaoh.	9 July 2009
113	"Series 1, Episode 13"	Dave Cohen, Jon Holmes and Ben Ward	"Terrible Tudors"	The tumultuous history of the Globe Theatre (animated). The ghost of Richard III challenges William Shakespeare over the historical accuracy of the play based on the King's life.	9 July 2009
113	"Series 1, Episode 13"	Dave Cohen, Jon Holmes and Ben Ward	"Vicious Vikings"	HHTV News: Bob Hale's Viking Report. King Alfred is a Saxon king who fight the Vikings in the 800s. The city of Swansea is a city of the "sea" named after the Viking (Danish) king "Swayne". Stupid Deaths: Sigurd the Mighty.	9 July 2009
113	"Series 1, Episode 13"	Dave Cohen, Jon Holmes and Ben Ward	"Gorgeous Georgians"	John Montagu, 4th Earl of Sandwich, "invents" the sandwich. HHTV Sport: Lice racing.	9 July 2009
Song: Vile Victorians - "Burke & Hare". Performed by Mathew Baynton with Jim Howick and Simon Farnaby.

=== Series 2 (2010) ===
No.	Title	Written by	Segments	Summary	Original release date
201	"Series 2, Episode 1"	Mathew Baynton, Gerard Foster, Jon Holmes, Greg Jenner, Giles Pilbrow, Steve Punt, Laurence Rickard	"Rotten Romans"	"Roman Come Dine with Me": Emperor Elagabalus plays some very nasty practical jokes on his dinner guests (parody of Come Dine with Me). (Note: All the "Come Dine with Me" sketches have commentary by Dave Lamb, from the Channel 4 series.")	31 May 2010
201	"Series 2, Episode 1"	Mathew Baynton, Gerard Foster, Jon Holmes, Greg Jenner, Giles Pilbrow, Steve Punt, Laurence Rickard	"Terrible Tudors"	Elizabeth I is picky about her portrait. "Historical Mastermind": Shakespeare, category 'Words What I Made Up' (parody of Mastermind).	31 May 2010
201	"Series 2, Episode 1"	Mathew Baynton, Gerard Foster, Jon Holmes, Greg Jenner, Giles Pilbrow, Steve Punt, Laurence Rickard	"Incredible Incas"	Shouty Man: New! Multi-Purpose Incan Hole. Incan Sham-pee (advertisement).	31 May 2010
201	"Series 2, Episode 1"	Mathew Baynton, Gerard Foster, Jon Holmes, Greg Jenner, Giles Pilbrow, Steve Punt, Laurence Rickard	"Vile Victorians"	The invention of badminton. Meet the many eccentric pets of Walter Rothschild, 2nd Baron Rothschild (animated). Stupid Deaths: Bobby Leach.	31 May 2010
201	"Series 2, Episode 1"	Mathew Baynton, Gerard Foster, Jon Holmes, Greg Jenner, Giles Pilbrow, Steve Punt, Laurence Rickard	"Slimy Stuarts"	The story of the Gunpowder Plot as action movie "Fawkes' 13" (movie trailer). Charles I's unusual punishments for government critics.	31 May 2010
201	"Series 2, Episode 1"	Mathew Baynton, Gerard Foster, Jon Holmes, Greg Jenner, Giles Pilbrow, Steve Punt, Laurence Rickard	"Woeful Second World War"	PM Winston Churchill discusses arming the British Home Guard. Video game: Operation Defend Britain. The Durham Home Guard branch do more damage to themselves than to the enemy.	31 May 2010
201	"Series 2, Episode 1"	Mathew Baynton, Gerard Foster, Jon Holmes, Greg Jenner, Giles Pilbrow, Steve Punt, Laurence Rickard	"Vicious Vikings"	Attempting to navigate by following (but not necessarily feeding) a raven.	31 May 2010
Song: Vicious Vikings - "Literally (The Viking Song)" (1980's glam metal power ballad parody). Lyrics by Mathew Baynton and Laurence Rickard. Performed by Mathew Baynton, Jim Howick, Ben Willbond and Laurence Rickard.
202	"Series 2, Episode 2"	Dave Cohen, Gerard Foster, Greggory Jenner, Oriane Messina, Giles Pilbrow, Laurence Rickard, Colin Swash, Joe Tucker and Raphael Warner	"Putrid Pirates"	Captain Basil Hood quickly regrets stealing a herd of seasick cows. "Historical Hospital": The ship's carpenter steps in to perform an amputation.	1 June 2010
202	"Series 2, Episode 2"	Dave Cohen, Gerard Foster, Greggory Jenner, Oriane Messina, Giles Pilbrow, Laurence Rickard, Colin Swash, Joe Tucker and Raphael Warner	"Woeful Second World War"	World War II Art Show: Magician Jasper Maskelyne helps the Allies hide military installations. Wrapping children in brown paper for warmth leads to a postal mix-up.	1 June 2010
202	"Series 2, Episode 2"	Dave Cohen, Gerard Foster, Greggory Jenner, Oriane Messina, Giles Pilbrow, Laurence Rickard, Colin Swash, Joe Tucker and Raphael Warner	"Groovy Greeks"	Stupid Deaths: Heraclitus. Evil-Spirit-Preventing-Door-Frame-Tar (advertisement). The Oracle of Delphi predicts Aeschylus' death.	1 June 2010
202	"Series 2, Episode 2"	Dave Cohen, Gerard Foster, Greggory Jenner, Oriane Messina, Giles Pilbrow, Laurence Rickard, Colin Swash, Joe Tucker and Raphael Warner	"Slimy Stuarts"	Oliver Cromwell bans Christmas celebrations--among many other things.	1 June 2010
202	"Series 2, Episode 2"	Dave Cohen, Gerard Foster, Greggory Jenner, Oriane Messina, Giles Pilbrow, Laurence Rickard, Colin Swash, Joe Tucker and Raphael Warner	"Awful Egyptians"	Historical Desktops: Cleopatra courts Mark Antony via social network.	1 June 2010
202	"Series 2, Episode 2"	Dave Cohen, Gerard Foster, Greggory Jenner, Oriane Messina, Giles Pilbrow, Laurence Rickard, Colin Swash, Joe Tucker and Raphael Warner	"Gorgeous Georgians"	HHTV Sport: Ex-slave Bill Richmond revolutionises boxing. Parents tour a boarding school during a violent pupil rebellion.	1 June 2010
Song: Slimy Stuarts - "Charles II: King of Bling" (rap music parody, feat. "My Name Is" by Eminem). Performed by Mathew Baynton with Martha Howe-Douglas, Jim Howick, Ben Willbond, Laurence Rickard and Lawry Lewin.
203	"Series 2, Episode 3"	Lucy Clarke, Dave Cohen, Greg Jenner, Giles Pilbrow, Laurence Rickard and Fay Rusling	"Rotten Romans"	Christians compete to avoid Roman persecution on "I'm a Christian, Get Me out of Here!" (parody of I'm a Celebrity... Get Me out of Here!). Emperor Nero's marital woes are featured in "Love You to Death" (movie trailer). Ave! Magazine: Profiling celebrity gladiator Spiculus.	2 June 2010
203	"Series 2, Episode 3"	Lucy Clarke, Dave Cohen, Greg Jenner, Giles Pilbrow, Laurence Rickard and Fay Rusling	"Measly Middle Ages"	The "Historical Paramedics" try reviving an unconscious patient with treacle and wee. Vincenzo Larfoff (special guest David Baddiel) is your host for Scary Stories: "The Children of Woolpit".	2 June 2010
203	"Series 2, Episode 3"	Lucy Clarke, Dave Cohen, Greg Jenner, Giles Pilbrow, Laurence Rickard and Fay Rusling	"Groovy Greeks"	Sending a student off to school.	2 June 2010
203	"Series 2, Episode 3"	Lucy Clarke, Dave Cohen, Greg Jenner, Giles Pilbrow, Laurence Rickard and Fay Rusling	"Terrible Tudors"	Jester Will Somers is the only man who can safely break the news of Queen Catherine Howard's infidelities to Henry VIII. Stupid Deaths: Tudor entertainer.	2 June 2010
203	"Series 2, Episode 3"	Lucy Clarke, Dave Cohen, Greg Jenner, Giles Pilbrow, Laurence Rickard and Fay Rusling	"Savage Stone Age"	Preparing for a hunting trip. The Caveman Workout, the low-tech way to get in shape (advertisement).	2 June 2010
203	"Series 2, Episode 3"	Lucy Clarke, Dave Cohen, Greg Jenner, Giles Pilbrow, Laurence Rickard and Fay Rusling	"Awesome USA"	The invention of the telegraph means bad news for Pony Express riders. PR agent Cliff Whiteley gives advice to Wyatt Earp and Billy the Kid.	2 June 2010
Song: Groovy Greeks - "Spartan High School Musical" (parody of Disney's High School Musical). Performed by Mathew Baynton, Jim Howick, Ben Willbond and Laurence Rickard.
204	"Series 2, Episode 4"	Mathew Baynton, Dave Cohen, Gerard Foster, Greg Jenner, Giles Pilbrow, Laurence Rickard, Ben Ward and Ben Willbond	"Gorgeous Georgians"	Legendary Admiral Horatio Nelson turns out to be a trifle less than physically impressive. HHTV News: The public execution of escape artist Jack Sheppard.	3 June 2010
204	"Series 2, Episode 4"	Mathew Baynton, Dave Cohen, Gerard Foster, Greg Jenner, Giles Pilbrow, Laurence Rickard, Ben Ward and Ben Willbond	"Measly Middle Ages"	"Historical Hospital": A European physician and Arabian healer (special guest star Alexei Sayle) clash over treatment philosophies. Stupid Deaths: Humphrey de Bohun, 4th Earl of Hereford.	3 June 2010
204	"Series 2, Episode 4"	Mathew Baynton, Dave Cohen, Gerard Foster, Greg Jenner, Giles Pilbrow, Laurence Rickard, Ben Ward and Ben Willbond	"Incredible Incas"	Historical Shopping Channel: Inca Hour. "Stay Calmer When You Want to Harm a Llama" (advertisement).	3 June 2010
204	"Series 2, Episode 4"	Mathew Baynton, Dave Cohen, Gerard Foster, Greg Jenner, Giles Pilbrow, Laurence Rickard, Ben Ward and Ben Willbond	"Vile Victorians"	Scary Stories: "The Cabinet of Mystery". A con-artist sells tapeworm traps. Pioneering epidemiologist John Snow refuses to endorse the 'health benefits' of New! Victorian Beer (advertisement).	3 June 2010
204	"Series 2, Episode 4"	Mathew Baynton, Dave Cohen, Gerard Foster, Greg Jenner, Giles Pilbrow, Laurence Rickard, Ben Ward and Ben Willbond	"Groovy Greeks"	HHTV Sport: Live from the Siege of Troy--Paris vs Achilles. Dodgy War Machines No. 14: Elephant warfare (animated).	3 June 2010
204	"Series 2, Episode 4"	Mathew Baynton, Dave Cohen, Gerard Foster, Greg Jenner, Giles Pilbrow, Laurence Rickard, Ben Ward and Ben Willbond	"Woeful Second World War"	Winston Churchill plans D-Day late into the night, much to the dismay of his secretary and a general.	3 June 2010
Song: Woeful Second World War - "We're the WWII Girls" (Parody of "The Promise" by Girls Aloud). Performed by Alice Lowe, Katy Wix and Martha Howe-Douglas.
205	"Series 2, Episode 5"	Mark Blakewill, James Harris, Oriane Messina, Giles Pilbrow, Laurence Rickard, Colin Swash	"Putrid Pirates"	A new recruit is baffled by what his Captain considers treasure. Historical Shopping Channel: Pirate Hour.	4 June 2010
205	"Series 2, Episode 5"	Mark Blakewill, James Harris, Oriane Messina, Giles Pilbrow, Laurence Rickard, Colin Swash	"Incredible Incas"	CD set: "Live like an Incan" (advertisement). An Incan child gets some offbeat birthday presents.	4 June 2010
205	"Series 2, Episode 5"	Mark Blakewill, James Harris, Oriane Messina, Giles Pilbrow, Laurence Rickard, Colin Swash	"Awful Egyptians"	Video game: The Real Tomb Raider. Scary Stories: "The Curse of Tutankhamun".	4 June 2010
205	"Series 2, Episode 5"	Mark Blakewill, James Harris, Oriane Messina, Giles Pilbrow, Laurence Rickard, Colin Swash	"Gorgeous Georgians"	Prince Regent George IV has an unexpectedly good reaction to some bad news--not so much to the news that his corset's no longer working.	4 June 2010
205	"Series 2, Episode 5"	Mark Blakewill, James Harris, Oriane Messina, Giles Pilbrow, Laurence Rickard, Colin Swash	"Measly Middle Ages"	HHTV News: Bob Hale's Crusades Report. Old Crone: don't leave for the Crusades without one (advertisement).	4 June 2010
205	"Series 2, Episode 5"	Mark Blakewill, James Harris, Oriane Messina, Giles Pilbrow, Laurence Rickard, Colin Swash	"Awesome USA"	Agent Moses helps smuggle plantation slaves past their master to freedom.	4 June 2010
205	"Series 2, Episode 5"	Mark Blakewill, James Harris, Oriane Messina, Giles Pilbrow, Laurence Rickard, Colin Swash	"Rotten Romans"	Door-to-door dung salesman. How to behave at a Roman dinner party (parody of an educational film).	4 June 2010
Song: Gorgeous Georgians - "George IV: Couldn't Stand My Wife" (pop ballad parody). Lyrics by Laurence Rickard. Performed by Jim Howick with Lawry Lewin.
206	"Series 2, Episode 6"	Lucy Clarke, Dave Cohen, Gerard Foster, Jon Holmes, Greg Jenner, Giles Pilbrow and Laurence Rickard	"Gorgeous Georgians"	Mad King George III's royal physicians torture him in the name of treatment. "Ready Steady Feast": On the run from the cure, the King pauses to plant a beef loin.	8 June 2010
206	"Series 2, Episode 6"	Lucy Clarke, Dave Cohen, Gerard Foster, Jon Holmes, Greg Jenner, Giles Pilbrow and Laurence Rickard	"Rotten Romans"	Emperor Elagabalus' Romo Lottery Millions--with luck, your prize won't be poisonous. Paranoid Emperor Tiberius is suspicious of a Capresi peasant bearing gifts.	8 June 2010
206	"Series 2, Episode 6"	Lucy Clarke, Dave Cohen, Gerard Foster, Jon Holmes, Greg Jenner, Giles Pilbrow and Laurence Rickard	"Smashing Saxons"	Weather forecast. A farmer hasn't quite thought through his latest attempt to ward off ghosts. Suggestions for coping with famine.	8 June 2010
206	"Series 2, Episode 6"	Lucy Clarke, Dave Cohen, Gerard Foster, Jon Holmes, Greg Jenner, Giles Pilbrow and Laurence Rickard	"Awesome USA"	Stupid Deaths: Clement Vallandingham. Dodgy War Tactics No. 23: Battle of the Crater (animated).	8 June 2010
206	"Series 2, Episode 6"	Lucy Clarke, Dave Cohen, Gerard Foster, Jon Holmes, Greg Jenner, Giles Pilbrow and Laurence Rickard	"Savage Stone Age"	Trepanadol, the surefire headache cure. European and Peruvian tribes compete on "Stone Age Family Fortunes" (parody of Family Fortunes).	8 June 2010
206	"Series 2, Episode 6"	Lucy Clarke, Dave Cohen, Gerard Foster, Jon Holmes, Greg Jenner, Giles Pilbrow and Laurence Rickard	"Vile Victorians"	Cliff Whiteley advises Florence Nightingale and Mary Seacole. Schoolchildren forced to learn by rote turn the tables on their teacher.	8 June 2010
Song: Putrid Pirates - "Blackbeard's Song" (Gilbert & Sullivan parody). Performed by Jim Howick with Laurence Rickard, Ben Willbond and Mathew Baynton.
207	"Series 2, Episode 7"	Dave Cohen, Greg Jenner, Giles Pilbrow, Steve Punt, Laurence Rickard, Fay Rusling	"Measly Middle Ages"	A marauding knight can't get into a lord's castle, so attacks the lord's serfs instead. Imagine spot: Peasant Joan of Arc is confused when an angel announces she's destined for great things.	15 June 2010
207	"Series 2, Episode 7"	Dave Cohen, Greg Jenner, Giles Pilbrow, Steve Punt, Laurence Rickard, Fay Rusling	"Putrid Pirates"	(Reluctantly) dressing in women's clothing and other tricks to lure ships close enough for attack. "Ready Steady Feast": Captain Ned Low displays a decided taste for cruelty--if not actual human flesh.	15 June 2010
207	"Series 2, Episode 7"	Dave Cohen, Greg Jenner, Giles Pilbrow, Steve Punt, Laurence Rickard, Fay Rusling	"Vile Victorians"	The proposed inventions have an unusual power source in common on "Victorian Dragon's Den" (parody of Dragon's Den).	15 June 2010
207	"Series 2, Episode 7"	Dave Cohen, Greg Jenner, Giles Pilbrow, Steve Punt, Laurence Rickard, Fay Rusling	"Smashing Saxons"	Words We Get From the: Saxons. New! Saxon Sign of the Cross (advertisement). Two peasants discuss ergotism in-between the wild flailing.	15 June 2010
207	"Series 2, Episode 7"	Dave Cohen, Greg Jenner, Giles Pilbrow, Steve Punt, Laurence Rickard, Fay Rusling	"Slimy Stuarts"	HHTV News: Civil War. Bob Hale gives the Civil War Report, while Mike Peabody reports live from the Battle of Marston Moor.	15 June 2010
207	"Series 2, Episode 7"	Dave Cohen, Greg Jenner, Giles Pilbrow, Steve Punt, Laurence Rickard, Fay Rusling	"Cut-Throat Celts"	Dodgy War Inventions No. 79: Romans try using stilts to cross marshland (animated). "Historical Wife Swap": An upscale Roman couple moves into newly conquered Britain and swaps with a traditional Celtic family.	15 June 2010
Song: Vile Victorians - "Victorian Inventions" (music hall pastiche). Performed by Ben Willbond and Alice Lowe.
208	"Series 2, Episode 8"	Mathew Baynton, Dave Cohen, Toby Davies & Chris Pell, Jon Holmes, Giles Pilbrow, Steve Punt, Laurence Rickard, George Sawyer, Mark Shillabeer and Ben Willbond	"Vicious Vikings"	An attempt at fearsome war paint. The attack on Lindisfarne monastery is interrupted when the warriors can't quite remember why they're attacking.	22 June 2010
208	"Series 2, Episode 8"	Mathew Baynton, Dave Cohen, Toby Davies & Chris Pell, Jon Holmes, Giles Pilbrow, Steve Punt, Laurence Rickard, George Sawyer, Mark Shillabeer and Ben Willbond	"Terrible Tudors"	HHTV Sport: Inter-village football matches are serious business. A mugger tries to adjust his rates to avoid punishment.	22 June 2010
208	"Series 2, Episode 8"	Mathew Baynton, Dave Cohen, Toby Davies & Chris Pell, Jon Holmes, Giles Pilbrow, Steve Punt, Laurence Rickard, George Sawyer, Mark Shillabeer and Ben Willbond	"Woeful Second World War"	Some of the more gruesome German attempts to keep warm at Stalingrad. Dodgy War Inventions No. 28: Russian anti-tank dog bombs (animated).	22 June 2010
208	"Series 2, Episode 8"	Mathew Baynton, Dave Cohen, Toby Davies & Chris Pell, Jon Holmes, Giles Pilbrow, Steve Punt, Laurence Rickard, George Sawyer, Mark Shillabeer and Ben Willbond	"Gorgeous Georgians"	Shouty (Wo)Man: New! Georgian Fan, the communications revolution. A courtship is conducted entirely via fan sign language. "Historical Fashion Fix": A peasant gets a taste of aristocratic Macaroni fashion.	22 June 2010
208	"Series 2, Episode 8"	Mathew Baynton, Dave Cohen, Toby Davies & Chris Pell, Jon Holmes, Giles Pilbrow, Steve Punt, Laurence Rickard, George Sawyer, Mark Shillabeer and Ben Willbond	"Slimy Stuarts"	Stupid Deaths: Arthur Aston. Scary Stories: "The Terror of Tedworth".	22 June 2010
208	"Series 2, Episode 8"	Mathew Baynton, Dave Cohen, Toby Davies & Chris Pell, Jon Holmes, Giles Pilbrow, Steve Punt, Laurence Rickard, George Sawyer, Mark Shillabeer and Ben Willbond	"Rotten Romans"	News of the Empire: Julius Caesar Special. "Crimewatch BC" attempts to help locate Caesar's assassins (parody of Crimewatch UK).	22 June 2010
Song: Awful Egyptians - "Learn Your Hieroglyphics" (parody of "ABC" by the Jackson 5). Performed by Mathew Baynton with children's chorus.
209	"Series 2, Episode 9"	Mathew Baynton, Gerard Foster, Greg Jenner, Giles Pilbrow, Steve Punt, Laurence Rickard, Mark Shillabeer, Colin Swash and Ben Willbond	"Slimy Stuarts"	The introduction of a novel new drink called 'tea'. "Historical Hospital": A physician tries a cure involving pigeons.	29 June 2010
209	"Series 2, Episode 9"	Mathew Baynton, Gerard Foster, Greg Jenner, Giles Pilbrow, Steve Punt, Laurence Rickard, Mark Shillabeer, Colin Swash and Ben Willbond	"Vicious Vikings"	HHTV Sport: The rules of a family feud, including when to bring out the berserker. A chief's funeral celebration dissolves into a massive brawl.	29 June 2010
209	"Series 2, Episode 9"	Mathew Baynton, Gerard Foster, Greg Jenner, Giles Pilbrow, Steve Punt, Laurence Rickard, Mark Shillabeer, Colin Swash and Ben Willbond	"Woeful Second World War"	Anderson Bomb Shelter: one size fits all (advertisement). Stupid Deaths: Cockney businessman. An evacuee child from the city thinks he's landed in a den of monsters in "The Farm" (horror movie trailer parody).	29 June 2010
209	"Series 2, Episode 9"	Mathew Baynton, Gerard Foster, Greg Jenner, Giles Pilbrow, Steve Punt, Laurence Rickard, Mark Shillabeer, Colin Swash and Ben Willbond	"Incredible Incas"	The Chasqui messenger service turns into a game of Chinese Whispers. HHTV News: Bob Hale's Incan Report reviews the reigns of Manco, Sinchi, Lloque, Mayta, Cápac, Roca, Yahua, Viracocha (name of an Incan god), Pachacuti, and Tupac. In 1493, Huayna goes up to conquer Ecuador.	29 June 2010
209	"Series 2, Episode 9"	Mathew Baynton, Gerard Foster, Greg Jenner, Giles Pilbrow, Steve Punt, Laurence Rickard, Mark Shillabeer, Colin Swash and Ben Willbond	"Vile Victorians"	Welsh schoolchildren are forbidden to speak their native language under the Welsh Not punishment system. A little girl debates attending school with her parents in "Victorian EastEnders"	29 June 2010
209	"Series 2, Episode 9"	Mathew Baynton, Gerard Foster, Greg Jenner, Giles Pilbrow, Steve Punt, Laurence Rickard, Mark Shillabeer, Colin Swash and Ben Willbond	"Awesome USA"	New! Multi-purpose bandanna (advertisement).	29 June 2010
Song: Awesome USA - "Real Live Cowboys" (bluegrass parody). Performed by Ben Willbond, Laurence Rickard and Nathaniel Martello-White.
210	"Series 2, Episode 10"	Mathew Baynton, Dave Cohen, Giles Pilbrow, Steve Punt, Laurence Rickard, Ben Ward and Ben Willbond	"Measly Middle Ages"	The News at 1066 provides updates from the Norman Conquest via Bayeux Tapestry. Trubador Bertran de Born releases "Now That's What I Call Miserable!: Vol. 3" to mixed reviews including Simon Cowell's (a call back to the animated pig piano sketch in Series 1).	6 July 2010
210	"Series 2, Episode 10"	Mathew Baynton, Dave Cohen, Giles Pilbrow, Steve Punt, Laurence Rickard, Ben Ward and Ben Willbond	"Vile Victorians"	All a seventh child wants for his birthday is a name in "Victorian EastEnders". Shouty Man: New! Victorian Maid. Scary Stories: "The Freaks".	6 July 2010
210	"Series 2, Episode 10"	Mathew Baynton, Dave Cohen, Giles Pilbrow, Steve Punt, Laurence Rickard, Ben Ward and Ben Willbond	"Cut-Throat Celts"	"Historical Fashion Fix": A warrior gets an unusual pre-battle makeover.	6 July 2010
210	"Series 2, Episode 10"	Mathew Baynton, Dave Cohen, Giles Pilbrow, Steve Punt, Laurence Rickard, Ben Ward and Ben Willbond	"Slimy Stuarts"	King Charles I's French bride is less than pleased to learn he's sent a stand-in groom. A Scots congregation needs some serious persuasion to accept the new English prayer books.	6 July 2010
210	"Series 2, Episode 10"	Mathew Baynton, Dave Cohen, Giles Pilbrow, Steve Punt, Laurence Rickard, Ben Ward and Ben Willbond	"Gorgeous Georgians"	HHTV Sport: Play-by-play of a pinching match. A fresh army recruit gets a rude surprise on reporting for duty.	6 July 2010
210	"Series 2, Episode 10"	Mathew Baynton, Dave Cohen, Giles Pilbrow, Steve Punt, Laurence Rickard, Ben Ward and Ben Willbond	"Awful Egyptians"	Cleopatra's beauty regime. "Historical Hospital": Dr Isis prescribes some surprisingly effective treatments.	6 July 2010
Song: Cut-Throat Celts - "Boudicca" (alternative rock parody, including "Pop Muzik" by M). Performed by Martha Howe-Douglas with Mathew Baynton, Jim Howick, Ben Willbond and Laurence Rickard.
211	"Series 2, Episode 11"	Dave Cohen, Gerard Foster, Jon Holmes, Greg Jenner, Caroline Norris, Giles Pilbrow, Laurence Rickard, Colin Swash, Ben Ward	"Rotten Romans"	Caligula recoups by attacking the sea after forgetting to tell the army about his planned British invasion. Life as a legionary.	13 July 2010
211	"Series 2, Episode 11"	Dave Cohen, Gerard Foster, Jon Holmes, Greg Jenner, Caroline Norris, Giles Pilbrow, Laurence Rickard, Colin Swash, Ben Ward	"Measly Middle Ages"	The plague forecast. Scots warriors don't notice the glaring flaw in their plan to invade plague-weakened England until it's too late. An English groom encounters some awkward marriage traditions in "My Big Fat (Medieval Scottish) Wedding" (parody of My Big Fat Greek Wedding).	13 July 2010
211	"Series 2, Episode 11"	Dave Cohen, Gerard Foster, Jon Holmes, Greg Jenner, Caroline Norris, Giles Pilbrow, Laurence Rickard, Colin Swash, Ben Ward	"Awful Egyptians"	"Ready Steady Feast": Comparing the diets of a peasant and pyramid builder. Pyramid Weekly magazine offers a stone-of-the-month scheme (advertisement).	13 July 2010
211	"Series 2, Episode 11"	Dave Cohen, Gerard Foster, Jon Holmes, Greg Jenner, Caroline Norris, Giles Pilbrow, Laurence Rickard, Colin Swash, Ben Ward	"Awesome USA"	Dodgy War Inventions No. 21: the first ironclad ship (animated). General Stonewall Jackson shows off his narcolepsy and (many) other eccentricities.	13 July 2010
211	"Series 2, Episode 11"	Dave Cohen, Gerard Foster, Jon Holmes, Greg Jenner, Caroline Norris, Giles Pilbrow, Laurence Rickard, Colin Swash, Ben Ward	"Groovy Greeks"	Spartan High's parent/teacher night. Stupid Deaths: Draco.	13 July 2010
211	"Series 2, Episode 11"	Dave Cohen, Gerard Foster, Jon Holmes, Greg Jenner, Caroline Norris, Giles Pilbrow, Laurence Rickard, Colin Swash, Ben Ward	"Terrible Tudors"	HHTV News: Bob Hale's Catholic Report. King Henry VIII plays tennis while his Queen Anne Boleyn is executed.	13 July 2010
Song: Smashing Saxons - "Funky Monks" ("The Monks' Song") (parody of "Play That Funky Music" by Wild Cherry, incorporating Gregorian-style chanting). Performed by Ben Willbond, Mathew Baynton and Jim Howick with Terry Deary and Alice Lowe.
212	"Series 2, Episode 12"	Mathew Baynton, Susie Donkin, Gerard Foster, Giles Pilbrow, Laurence Rickard, George Sawyer, Joe Tucker, Raphael Warner and Ben Willbond	"Savage Stone Age"	"DI Bones: Historical Crime Squad": The case of the caveman's death. Caveman Art Show: Cave wall painting.	20 July 2010
212	"Series 2, Episode 12"	Mathew Baynton, Susie Donkin, Gerard Foster, Giles Pilbrow, Laurence Rickard, George Sawyer, Joe Tucker, Raphael Warner and Ben Willbond	"Woeful Second World War"	Codebreakers are just a little too clever for their own good. Agent Sophie shows off spy gadgets to a French Resistance contact.	20 July 2010
212	"Series 2, Episode 12"	Mathew Baynton, Susie Donkin, Gerard Foster, Giles Pilbrow, Laurence Rickard, George Sawyer, Joe Tucker, Raphael Warner and Ben Willbond	"Rotten Romans"	An Andabatae gladiator needs encouragement before heading into the arena. Stupid Deaths: Diodorus the hunchback.	20 July 2010
212	"Series 2, Episode 12"	Mathew Baynton, Susie Donkin, Gerard Foster, Giles Pilbrow, Laurence Rickard, George Sawyer, Joe Tucker, Raphael Warner and Ben Willbond	"Smashing Saxons"	Bag-O-Swallow-Chick Stomach Stones: works great against headaches, not so much against Vikings (advertisement). The Saxon Helmet Company offers a sympathy refund on a (badly) failed lucky helmet. Words We Get From the: Saxons.	20 July 2010
212	"Series 2, Episode 12"	Mathew Baynton, Susie Donkin, Gerard Foster, Giles Pilbrow, Laurence Rickard, George Sawyer, Joe Tucker, Raphael Warner and Ben Willbond	"Terrible Tudors"	"Horrible Histories World Wrestling": Francis I of France defeats Henry VIII by tripping him up. Historical Desktops: Henry VIII surfs dating services and winds up starting the English Reformation online.	20 July 2010
212	"Series 2, Episode 12"	Mathew Baynton, Susie Donkin, Gerard Foster, Giles Pilbrow, Laurence Rickard, George Sawyer, Joe Tucker, Raphael Warner and Ben Willbond	"Incredible Incas"	Francisco Pizarro's "Very Rough Guide" to Peru.	20 July 2010
Song: Incredible Incas - "Do the Pachacuti" (parody of novelty dance songs). Lyrics by Laurence Rickard. Performed by Mathew Baynton with Martha Howe-Douglas, Alice Lowe and Laurence Rickard.
213	"Savage Songs"	Mathew Baynton, Dave Cohen, Laurence Rickard	"Savage Songs"	A chronological compilation of standout music videos from the second series, as chosen by the producers--including a special encore from the first series. "Spartan School Musical" (from S02E03), "Boudicca" (S02E10), "Literally (The Viking Song)" (S02E01), "Do the Pachacuti" (S02E12), "Charles II: King of Bling" (S02E02), "Blackbeard's Song" (S02E06),"George IV: Couldn't Stand My Wife" (S02E05), "Real Live Cowboys" (S02E09), "Victorian Inventions" (S02E07), "We're the World War II Girls" (S02E04). Encore: "The 4 Georges: Born 2 Rule" (S01E01).	27 July 2010

=== Series 3 (2011) ===
No.	Title	Written by	Segments	Summary	Original release date
301	"Series 3, Episode 1"	Dave Cohen, Rosanna Lowe, Giles Pilbrow, Laurence Rickard, Colin Swash and Ben Ward	"Rotten Romans"	A general will go to any lengths to qualify for the Roman triumph. Introducing the new aBook (parody of Apple advertisements).	30 May 2011
301	"Series 3, Episode 1"	Dave Cohen, Rosanna Lowe, Giles Pilbrow, Laurence Rickard, Colin Swash and Ben Ward	"Fabulous French"	A prankster count sets up his own reality show, "You've Been Artois'd!" (parody of You’ve Been Framed).	30 May 2011
301	"Series 3, Episode 1"	Dave Cohen, Rosanna Lowe, Giles Pilbrow, Laurence Rickard, Colin Swash and Ben Ward	"Terrible Tudors"	A gong farmer tries to convince his son to follow in his footsteps. Elizabeth I unexpectedly arrives at a noble's home to stay.	30 May 2011
301	"Series 3, Episode 1"	Dave Cohen, Rosanna Lowe, Giles Pilbrow, Laurence Rickard, Colin Swash and Ben Ward	"Angry Aztecs"	Dog steak and pond scum biscuits are on the menu of "Historical Masterchef" (parody of MasterChef). Howler monkeys realise why they're a favourite hunting target (animated).	30 May 2011
301	"Series 3, Episode 1"	Dave Cohen, Rosanna Lowe, Giles Pilbrow, Laurence Rickard, Colin Swash and Ben Ward	"Gorgeous Georgians"	Pay your way to luxury in Newgate Prison (parody of Premier Inn advertisements).	30 May 2011
301	"Series 3, Episode 1"	Dave Cohen, Rosanna Lowe, Giles Pilbrow, Laurence Rickard, Colin Swash and Ben Ward	"Vicious Vikings"	Words We Get From the: Vikings. The "Historical Paramedics" try using runic symbols to treat a cycling injury.	30 May 2011
301	"Series 3, Episode 1"	Dave Cohen, Rosanna Lowe, Giles Pilbrow, Laurence Rickard, Colin Swash and Ben Ward	"Vile Victorians"	A picnicking couple have a less-than-polite debate over etiquette. Another couple work out their differences via floral messaging system.	30 May 2011
301	"Series 3, Episode 1"	Dave Cohen, Rosanna Lowe, Giles Pilbrow, Laurence Rickard, Colin Swash and Ben Ward	"Frightful First World War"	The less-than-encouraging results of the Somme campaign. Fabulous Fat King's Fat Factory, for all your (surprisingly extensive) wartime fat needs (parody of Sheilas' Wheels car insurance adverts).	30 May 2011
Song: Gorgeous Georgians - "Dick Turpin, Highwayman" (parody of "Stand and Deliver" by Adam and the Ants). Performed by Mathew Baynton with Jim Howick, Simon Farnaby, Laurence Rickard, Ben Willbond and Martha Howe-Douglas.
302	"Series 3, Episode 2"	Dave Cohen, Susie Donkin, Giles Pilbrow, Laurence Rickard and Ben Ward	"Nasty Knights"	A raiding party can either overcome a series of incredibly dangerous obstacles to get into a castle--or they can do it the hard way. The siege forecast.	31 May 2011
302	"Series 3, Episode 2"	Dave Cohen, Susie Donkin, Giles Pilbrow, Laurence Rickard and Ben Ward	"Slimy Stuarts"	Whale phlegm is on the menu on "Historical Masterchef". A dinner party is made awkward by Walter Raleigh's severed head.	31 May 2011
302	"Series 3, Episode 2"	Dave Cohen, Susie Donkin, Giles Pilbrow, Laurence Rickard and Ben Ward	"Groovy Greeks"	Stupid Deaths: A Greek boxer is killed by the statue of Theagenes of Thasos. Words We Get From the: Greeks.	31 May 2011
302	"Series 3, Episode 2"	Dave Cohen, Susie Donkin, Giles Pilbrow, Laurence Rickard and Ben Ward	"Gorgeous Georgians"	Historical Pet Shop: Smuggling lace in a goose's crop. Inventor John Joseph Merlin belatedly discovers a few key design flaws while filming an advertisement for the first practical roller skates.	31 May 2011
302	"Series 3, Episode 2"	Dave Cohen, Susie Donkin, Giles Pilbrow, Laurence Rickard and Ben Ward	"Smashing Saxons"	HHTV News: Mike Peabody live from the Battle of Maldon. Monk Magazine: All the "modern" monk needs to know.	31 May 2011
302	"Series 3, Episode 2"	Dave Cohen, Susie Donkin, Giles Pilbrow, Laurence Rickard and Ben Ward	"Vile Victorians"	Opening the first public toilet in more ways than one. The strange story behind the establishment of Alfred Nobel's Peace Prize.	31 May 2011
Song: Ruthless Rulers - "The Monarchs' Song (The English Kings and Queens)" (Chas & Dave parody). Performed by Simon Farnaby, Jim Howick, Laurence Rickard, Mathew Baynton, Ben Willbond and Martha Howe-Douglas.
303	"Series 3, Episode 3"	Dave Cohen, Gerard Foster, Giles Pilbrow, Steve Punt, Laurence Rickard, George Sawyer and Ben Ward	"Frightful First World War"	A naive young recruit tries to learn the ropes. Shouty Man: New! WWI Wee-Wee, the multi-purpose liquid revolution.	1 June 2011
303	"Series 3, Episode 3"	Dave Cohen, Gerard Foster, Giles Pilbrow, Steve Punt, Laurence Rickard, George Sawyer and Ben Ward	"Smashing Saxons"	The host of "Invasion, Invasion, Invasion" inadvertently helps Hengist and Horsa steal Kent from Vortigern (parody of Location, Location, Location).	1 June 2011
303	"Series 3, Episode 3"	Dave Cohen, Gerard Foster, Giles Pilbrow, Steve Punt, Laurence Rickard, George Sawyer and Ben Ward	"Slimy Stuarts"	Scary Stories: "Evil Edmund". The "Historical Paramedics" try treating a fainting victim with a live sheep and heavy stones.	1 June 2011
303	"Series 3, Episode 3"	Dave Cohen, Gerard Foster, Giles Pilbrow, Steve Punt, Laurence Rickard, George Sawyer and Ben Ward	"Measly Middle Ages"	Stupid Deaths: James II of Scotland.	1 June 2011
303	"Series 3, Episode 3"	Dave Cohen, Gerard Foster, Giles Pilbrow, Steve Punt, Laurence Rickard, George Sawyer and Ben Ward	"Terrible Tudors"	The story of Lady Jane Grey, queen for nine days. The invention of the English mile.	1 June 2011
303	"Series 3, Episode 3"	Dave Cohen, Gerard Foster, Giles Pilbrow, Steve Punt, Laurence Rickard, George Sawyer and Ben Ward	"Fabulous French"	HHTV News: Bob Hale's French Revolution Report. Mike Peabody reports live from Fishguard where the French army face an unlikely foe.	1 June 2011
Song: Measly Middle Ages - "William Wallace, Scottish Rebel" (heavy metal parody of "Doctor Alibi" by Slash). Performed by Ben Willbond with Simon Farnaby, Jim Howick, Laurence Rickard and Mathew Baynton.
304	"Series 3, Episode 4"	Dave Cohen, Gerard Foster, Giles Pilbrow, Laurence Rickard, Colin Swash and Ben Ward	"Slimy Stuarts"	Eccentric highwayman James Hind refuses to steal from Royalists. Charles II is less than impressed with his coronation gift.	2 June 2011
304	"Series 3, Episode 4"	Dave Cohen, Gerard Foster, Giles Pilbrow, Laurence Rickard, Colin Swash and Ben Ward	"Measly Middle Ages"	"Historical Fashion Fix": A peasant's transformation into a nobleman is so good it's literally illegal. A leech collector inadvertently ends up demonstrating the job to a skeptical pal.	2 June 2011
304	"Series 3, Episode 4"	Dave Cohen, Gerard Foster, Giles Pilbrow, Laurence Rickard, Colin Swash and Ben Ward	"Rotten Romans"	"DI Bones: Historical Crime Squad": The case of Caligula and the mystery assassins. Video game: Arena Fighter. Making sure gladiator casualties were really dead.	2 June 2011
304	"Series 3, Episode 4"	Dave Cohen, Gerard Foster, Giles Pilbrow, Laurence Rickard, Colin Swash and Ben Ward	"Nasty Knights"	"Dominic Duckworth: HHTV Investigates': Cheating in the age of chivalry. Stupid Deaths: Knights Templar.	2 June 2011
304	"Series 3, Episode 4"	Dave Cohen, Gerard Foster, Giles Pilbrow, Laurence Rickard, Colin Swash and Ben Ward	"Groovy Greeks"	Words We Get From the: Greeks. Historical Head Teachers: Spartan Mr. Brasidas is pleased to learn a student's been stealing.	2 June 2011
304	"Series 3, Episode 4"	Dave Cohen, Gerard Foster, Giles Pilbrow, Laurence Rickard, Colin Swash and Ben Ward	"Gorgeous Georgians"	"George IV: Who on Earth Are You?": The newly crowned King takes a genealogist on a most unusual tour of the family tombs (parody of Who Do You Think You Are?).	2 June 2011
Song: Vile Victorians - "Work, Terrible Work!" (parody of "Food, Glorious Food" from the musical "Oliver!"). Performed by Ben Willbond, Laurence Rickard and Mathew Baynton with children's chorus.
305	"Series 3, Episode 5"	Dave Cohen, Gerard Foster, Giles Pilbrow, Laurence Rickard, Colin Swash and Ben Ward	"Measly Middle Ages"	John Balliol is dissatisfied with his luxurious exile. Stupid Deaths: Griffith Ap Llewelyn.	3 June 2011
305	"Series 3, Episode 5"	Dave Cohen, Gerard Foster, Giles Pilbrow, Laurence Rickard, Colin Swash and Ben Ward	"Rotten Romans"	"Historical Hospital": A Roman physician prescribes gladiator's blood as a tonic. Shouty Man: New! Criminal's Head.	3 June 2011
305	"Series 3, Episode 5"	Dave Cohen, Gerard Foster, Giles Pilbrow, Laurence Rickard, Colin Swash and Ben Ward	"Fabulous French"	"Historical Wife Swap": Louis XVI and Marie Antoinette swap with a distinctly unimpressed starving peasant family.	3 June 2011
305	"Series 3, Episode 5"	Dave Cohen, Gerard Foster, Giles Pilbrow, Laurence Rickard, Colin Swash and Ben Ward	"Frightful First World War"	A new British arrival to the trenches struggles to locate a familiar accent amid the Commonwealth forces. Ladies' tights help Scots soldiers keep warm and safe in the trenches (advertisement).	3 June 2011
305	"Series 3, Episode 5"	Dave Cohen, Gerard Foster, Giles Pilbrow, Laurence Rickard, Colin Swash and Ben Ward	"Terrible Tudors"	Elizabeth I's Christmas present turns out to be a timekeeping revolution (from the "Christmas Special"). Special footwear helped women keep dry in muddy streets--but looking where they were going helped even more (animated). "Historical Fashion Fix": The latest peasant to have a makeover is unappreciative of his noble transformation.	3 June 2011
305	"Series 3, Episode 5"	Dave Cohen, Gerard Foster, Giles Pilbrow, Laurence Rickard, Colin Swash and Ben Ward	"Awful Egyptians"	HHTV News: Bob Hale's Tutankhamun Report.	3 June 2011
Song: Awful Egyptians - "Ra Ra Cleopatra" (Lady Gaga parody, particularly "Bad Romance"). Performed by Martha Howe-Douglas with Ben Willbond and Mathew Baynton.
306	"Series 3, Episode 6"	Dave Cohen, Gerard Foster, Giles Pilbrow, Laurence Rickard and Ben Ward	"Terrible Tudors"	Henry VIII unveils his patented all-you-can-meat Tudor diet plan. The "Historical Paramedics" try treating an asthma victim with buttered spiders.	7 June 2011
306	"Series 3, Episode 6"	Dave Cohen, Gerard Foster, Giles Pilbrow, Laurence Rickard and Ben Ward	"Cut-Throat Celts"	"Horrible Points of View": Taking questions and comments--also severed heads--from the era's viewer mailbag. Historical Pet Shop: Odd superstitions surrounding dogs.	7 June 2011
306	"Series 3, Episode 6"	Dave Cohen, Gerard Foster, Giles Pilbrow, Laurence Rickard and Ben Ward	"Measly Middle Ages"	HHTV News: Bob Hale's War of the Roses Report.	7 June 2011
306	"Series 3, Episode 6"	Dave Cohen, Gerard Foster, Giles Pilbrow, Laurence Rickard and Ben Ward	"Angry Aztecs"	"Aztec Come Dine With Me": The annual days of maize and beans have a rather anti-social side effect.	7 June 2011
306	"Series 3, Episode 6"	Dave Cohen, Gerard Foster, Giles Pilbrow, Laurence Rickard and Ben Ward	"Savage Stone Age"	A man tries to convince his skeptical hunter friend that settling down on a farm is the wave of the future. Shouty Man: New! Multi-Purpose String.	7 June 2011
306	"Series 3, Episode 6"	Dave Cohen, Gerard Foster, Giles Pilbrow, Laurence Rickard and Ben Ward	"Gorgeous Georgians"	The controversial final moments of Admiral Nelson, and then the unusual preservation method used on his body. Stupid Deaths: Countess of Coventry.	7 June 2011
Song: Measly Middle Ages - "The Truth About Richard III" (pop ballad parody). Performed by Jim Howick.
307	"Series 3, Episode 7"	Dave Cohen, Gerard Foster, Giles Pilbrow, Laurence Rickard and Colin Swash	"Awful Egyptians"	A tomb builder tries to convince a pharaoh that protecting his treasure is more important than a magnificent monument. Shouty Man: Ushabti Coffin Dolls.	14 June 2011
307	"Series 3, Episode 7"	Dave Cohen, Gerard Foster, Giles Pilbrow, Laurence Rickard and Colin Swash	"Gorgeous Georgians"	George I's English isn't any better than Robert Walpole's German, which poses a serious problem re: running the country--or does it? HHTV Sport: Twisting the hindquarters off a dead cow at the Highland Games.	14 June 2011
307	"Series 3, Episode 7"	Dave Cohen, Gerard Foster, Giles Pilbrow, Laurence Rickard and Colin Swash	"Slimy Stuarts"	"Horrible Points of View": Taking questions and comments on that new theatrical phenomenon, "actresses". Stupid Deaths: Molière.	14 June 2011
307	"Series 3, Episode 7"	Dave Cohen, Gerard Foster, Giles Pilbrow, Laurence Rickard and Colin Swash	"Vicious Vikings"	"Historical Wife Swap": A well-to-do warrior family swaps with their slave thralls.	14 June 2011
307	"Series 3, Episode 7"	Dave Cohen, Gerard Foster, Giles Pilbrow, Laurence Rickard and Colin Swash	"Awesome USA"	HHTV News: Bob Hale's American Report. Paul Revere's All-American Toothpaste (advertisement).	14 June 2011
307	"Series 3, Episode 7"	Dave Cohen, Gerard Foster, Giles Pilbrow, Laurence Rickard and Colin Swash	"Rotten Romans"	A newly recovered Caligula demands that those who offered their lives to the gods in exchange for his must now pay up.	14 June 2011
Song: Rotten Romans - "The Evil Emperors' Song" (parody of "Bad" by Michael Jackson). Performed by Simon Farnaby, Mathew Baynton, Ben Willbond and Jim Howick.
308	"Series 3, Episode 8"	Dave Cohen, Greg Jenner, Giles Pilbrow, Laurence Rickard, Joe Tucker, Ben Ward and Raphael Warner	"Measly Middle Ages"	William II meets his death in a mysterious hunting accident. Stupid Deaths: Henry I.	21 June 2011
308	"Series 3, Episode 8"	Dave Cohen, Greg Jenner, Giles Pilbrow, Laurence Rickard, Joe Tucker, Ben Ward and Raphael Warner	"Fabulous French"	HHTV News: Mike Peabody live from the storming of the Bastille. "Madam Tussaud's Make Show": How to make wax figures using freshly guillotined heads.	21 June 2011
308	"Series 3, Episode 8"	Dave Cohen, Greg Jenner, Giles Pilbrow, Laurence Rickard, Joe Tucker, Ben Ward and Raphael Warner	"Smashing Saxons"	A lone man embarks on a (not-entirely-)desperate quest to find his stolen wife in "Kidnapped!" (historical epic movie trailer parody). Words We Get From the: Saxons.	21 June 2011
308	"Series 3, Episode 8"	Dave Cohen, Greg Jenner, Giles Pilbrow, Laurence Rickard, Joe Tucker, Ben Ward and Raphael Warner	"Terrible Tudors"	Historical Head Teachers: Mr. Bullen demands that a student start his schoolday at 4:30 am. HHTV Sport: Horse racing with King Henry VIII--and child jockeys.	21 June 2011
308	"Series 3, Episode 8"	Dave Cohen, Greg Jenner, Giles Pilbrow, Laurence Rickard, Joe Tucker, Ben Ward and Raphael Warner	"Vicious Vikings"	"Winter Cooking with the Hairy Vikings" always involves a bit of walrus (parody of the Hairy Bikers). Historical Desktops: Ethelred the Unready suffers cyberbullying at the hands of Viking raiders.	21 June 2011
Song: Potty Pioneers - "The Suffragettes' Song" (synthpop parody). Performed by Martha Howe-Douglas and Alice Lowe with Ben Willbond and Laurence Rickard.
309	"Series 3, Episode 9"	Dave Cohen, Gerard Foster, Giles Pilbrow, Steve Punt, Laurence Rickard, Colin Swash and Ben Ward	"Vicious Vikings"	A literate monk convinces marauding raiders to spare him so he can record their badassery for all time. Other monastic captives are on sale at the "new market town of Dublin" in "We Sell Any Monk" (advertisement parody of We Buy Any Car).	28 June 2011
309	"Series 3, Episode 9"	Dave Cohen, Gerard Foster, Giles Pilbrow, Steve Punt, Laurence Rickard, Colin Swash and Ben Ward	"Vile Victorians"	Historical Pet Shop: The animal-loving 2nd Baron Rothschild makes his third appearance in as many series. The traffic report.	28 June 2011
309	"Series 3, Episode 9"	Dave Cohen, Gerard Foster, Giles Pilbrow, Steve Punt, Laurence Rickard, Colin Swash and Ben Ward	"Terrible Tudors"	A foreign traveller has difficulty grasping pre-decimal British coinage. A nobleman inadvertently runs afoul of Elizabeth I's peculiar clothing laws.	28 June 2011
309	"Series 3, Episode 9"	Dave Cohen, Gerard Foster, Giles Pilbrow, Steve Punt, Laurence Rickard, Colin Swash and Ben Ward	"Angry Aztecs"	"Aztec Gardeners' World" discusses fertilizing fields with human blood. Enjoy hours of family fun with Aztec Whodunnit-o (parody of Cluedo).	28 June 2011
309	"Series 3, Episode 9"	Dave Cohen, Gerard Foster, Giles Pilbrow, Steve Punt, Laurence Rickard, Colin Swash and Ben Ward	"Frightful First World War"	A general arrives to inspect the troops and discovers just how hard up both sides are for new recruits. Video Game: Splat That Rat!	28 June 2011
309	"Series 3, Episode 9"	Dave Cohen, Gerard Foster, Giles Pilbrow, Steve Punt, Laurence Rickard, Colin Swash and Ben Ward	"Rotten Romans"	Tabellarii messenger service, the classical equivalent of text messaging. A nervous smuggler runs into an unexpected obstacle in trying to run weapons past the gates of Rome.	28 June 2011
309	"Series 3, Episode 9"	Dave Cohen, Gerard Foster, Giles Pilbrow, Steve Punt, Laurence Rickard, Colin Swash and Ben Ward	"Measly Middle Ages"	"Medieval Come Dine with Me": When dying of the plague was the ultimate social "faux pas".	28 June 2011
Song: Angry Aztecs - "Discaztec (Ain't Staying Alive)" (disco parody, feat. "Stayin' Alive" by the Bee Gees). Performed by Laurence Rickard, Mathew Baynton and Jim Howick.
310	"Series 3, Episode 10"	Dave Cohen, Gerard Foster, Jon Holmes, Giles Pilbrow, Laurence Rickard, Ben Ward and Ben Willbond	"Frightful First World War"	Trying--and failing--to keep warm in the trenches in wintertime. Wartime improvisation is the order of the day on "Historical Masterchef".	12 July 2011
310	"Series 3, Episode 10"	Dave Cohen, Gerard Foster, Jon Holmes, Giles Pilbrow, Laurence Rickard, Ben Ward and Ben Willbond	"Smashing Saxons"	HHTV News: Bob Hale's Anglo-Saxon Report. The tumultuous love story of William the Conqueror and Matilda of Flanders is retold in "Mud and Matilda" (romantic comedy movie trailer parody). Words We Get From the: Normans.	12 July 2011
310	"Series 3, Episode 10"	Dave Cohen, Gerard Foster, Jon Holmes, Giles Pilbrow, Laurence Rickard, Ben Ward and Ben Willbond	"Gorgeous Georgians"	A fashionable day out to view the patients in Bedlam. Mercury is the key ingredient in Solomon's Live (not so very) Long Water (advertisement).	12 July 2011
310	"Series 3, Episode 10"	Dave Cohen, Gerard Foster, Jon Holmes, Giles Pilbrow, Laurence Rickard, Ben Ward and Ben Willbond	"Angry Aztecs"	Scary Stories: "The Mystery of Motecuhzoma". Video game: Warrior! Spanish Conquistador vs. Aztec Warrior.	12 July 2011
310	"Series 3, Episode 10"	Dave Cohen, Gerard Foster, Jon Holmes, Giles Pilbrow, Laurence Rickard, Ben Ward and Ben Willbond	"Rotten Romans"	Danke magazine: Barbarian fashion tips (parody of Hello! Magazine). The conquering barbarian hordes find deciding where exactly to begin sacking Rome isn't as simple as it seems.	12 July 2011
310	"Series 3, Episode 10"	Dave Cohen, Gerard Foster, Jon Holmes, Giles Pilbrow, Laurence Rickard, Ben Ward and Ben Willbond	"Slimy Stuarts"	William Harvey is willing to go to any lengths to further his anatomical research.	12 July 2011
Song: Slimy Stuarts - "The English Civil War Song" (parody of "Cool" from "West Side Story"). Performed by Mathew Baynton, Jim Howick, Lawry Lewin and Ben Willbond with Laurence Rickard and Simon Farnaby.
311	"Series 3, Episode 11"	Dave Cohen, Giles Pilbrow, Laurence Rickard, Ben Ward	"Terrible Tudors"	The not-quite-love story of Phillip and Mary is retold in the style of a graphic novel. Elizabeth I endorses Sugar-Paste Toothpaste (advertisement).	5 July 2011
311	"Series 3, Episode 11"	Dave Cohen, Giles Pilbrow, Laurence Rickard, Ben Ward	"Putrid Pirates"	A hippie buccaneer finds having an extra hook comes in handy on "Historical Masterchef". Pirate weather forecast.	5 July 2011
311	"Series 3, Episode 11"	Dave Cohen, Giles Pilbrow, Laurence Rickard, Ben Ward	"Vile Victorians"	"Victorian EastEnders" tells the story of one family's aspirations to move on up through the sewers. The "Historical Paramedics" try treating a collapsed victim with bacon, potato and the sheer fabulousness of top hats.	5 July 2011
311	"Series 3, Episode 11"	Dave Cohen, Giles Pilbrow, Laurence Rickard, Ben Ward	"Savage Stone Age"	A distinctly "grown-up drink" is among the innovative ideas pitched on "Stone Age Dragons' Den".	5 July 2011
311	"Series 3, Episode 11"	Dave Cohen, Giles Pilbrow, Laurence Rickard, Ben Ward	"Groovy Greeks"	HHTV Sport: On-the-spot coverage of a typical day at the Ancient Olympics (with special guest star Tanni Grey-Thompson). Stupid Deaths: Milo of Croton.	5 July 2011
311	"Series 3, Episode 11"	Dave Cohen, Giles Pilbrow, Laurence Rickard, Ben Ward	"Slimy Stuarts"	Historical Pet Shop: Rupert of the Rhine wants a dog that does a very specific set of tricks. A young man plans a less-than-romantic elopement on "Historical Don't Tell the Bride" (parody of Don't Tell the Bride).	5 July 2011
Song: Savage Stone Age - "The Ages of Stone" (bebop parody). Performed by Mathew Baynton.
312	"Series 3, Episode 12"	Gerard Foster, Rosanna Lowe, Giles Pilbrow, Laurence Rickard, Fay Rusling, Ben Ward	"Measly Middle Ages"	A peasant tries to leverage his rare and desirable plague-free status into a pay rise. The people of Strasbourg catch literal dance fever in 1518.	19 July 2011
312	"Series 3, Episode 12"	Gerard Foster, Rosanna Lowe, Giles Pilbrow, Laurence Rickard, Fay Rusling, Ben Ward	"Groovy Greeks"	Historical Pet Shop: Zeno of Elea requires subjects for some odd thought experiments. HHTV Festival News: Presenter Fearne Polyester participates in the all-female Thesmophoria (parody of Fearne Cotton). HHTV Sport: Crowning the winner at the Isthmian Games.	19 July 2011
312	"Series 3, Episode 12"	Gerard Foster, Rosanna Lowe, Giles Pilbrow, Laurence Rickard, Fay Rusling, Ben Ward	"Cut-Throat Celts"	An Irish king's attempt to ban all rhyme turns out to not be very well-thought-through.	19 July 2011
312	"Series 3, Episode 12"	Gerard Foster, Rosanna Lowe, Giles Pilbrow, Laurence Rickard, Fay Rusling, Ben Ward	"Savage Stone Age"	Comparisons between Stonehenge and the pyramids are eye-opening (animated). Cliff Whiteley discusses the many theories re: Stonehenge with one of its builders.	19 July 2011
312	"Series 3, Episode 12"	Gerard Foster, Rosanna Lowe, Giles Pilbrow, Laurence Rickard, Fay Rusling, Ben Ward	"Angry Aztecs"	Hi-Tec All-in-One Cactus multipurpose tool and Chuckle Resin chewing gum (advertisements).	19 July 2011
312	"Series 3, Episode 12"	Gerard Foster, Rosanna Lowe, Giles Pilbrow, Laurence Rickard, Fay Rusling, Ben Ward	"Slimy Stuarts"	"Horrible Points of View": Another look at Stuart-era entertainment, e.g. executions. Thomas Blood is brought before Charles II, who winds up being unexpectedly impressed - and entertained.	19 July 2011
Song: Cut-Throat Celts - "Celtic Boast Battle" (hip-hop parody, loosely parodying "Jump Around" by House of Pain incorporating beatboxing). Performed by Mathew Baynton and Jim Howick with Ben Willbond and Laurence Rickard.
313	"Savage Songs"	Dave Cohen and Ben Ward	"Savage Songs"	Chronological compilation of the standout music videos from the third series, as chosen by the producers. An encore is omitted this year to make room for the slightly longer "Monarchs' Song". "The Ages of Stone" (from S03E010), "Ra Ra Cleopatra" (S03E05), "Celtic Boast Battle" (S03E12), "William Wallace: Scottish Rebel" (S03E03), Discaztec (Ain't Staying Alive)" (S03E09), "The Truth About Richard III" (S03E06), "Dick Turpin, Highwayman" (S03E01), "Work, Terrible Work!" (S03E04), "The Suffragettes' Song" (S03E08) and "The Monarchs' Song (The English Kings and Queens)" (S03E02).	26 July 2011

=== Series 4 (2012) ===
No.	Title	Written by	Segments	Summary	Original release date
401	"Series 4, Episode 1"	Dave Cohen, Gerard Foster, Giles Pilbrow, Joe Tucker and Ben Ward	"Slimy Stuarts"	A clergyman makes an unusual patriotic request of his female parishioners. Oliver Cromwell requests that Peter Lely paint his portrait 'warts and all'.	9 April 2012
401	"Series 4, Episode 1"	Dave Cohen, Gerard Foster, Giles Pilbrow, Joe Tucker and Ben Ward	"Measly Middle Ages"	HH Movie Pitch: Lord Mayor Dick Whittington, pitching his life story to a panel of Hollywood producers, tries to avoid co-starring with a talking cat (pastiche of Orange mobile reminder advertisements, starring special guests Mark Gatiss, Reece Shearsmith and Steve Pemberton of the League of Gentlemen).	9 April 2012
401	"Series 4, Episode 1"	Dave Cohen, Gerard Foster, Giles Pilbrow, Joe Tucker and Ben Ward	"Terrible Tudors"	Vengeful Philip II of Spain tries - and fails - repeatedly to launch "The Spanish Armada" against Britain (movie trailer) part 1. Stupid Deaths: Archery accidents. The Spanish Armada (movie trailer) part 2.	9 April 2012
401	"Series 4, Episode 1"	Dave Cohen, Gerard Foster, Giles Pilbrow, Joe Tucker and Ben Ward	"Awful Egyptians"	A "hot scientist" extols the "Wonders of the Egyptian Universe" (parody of Brian Cox's Wonders of the Universe). Video game: Duat! Egyptian Book of the Dead.	9 April 2012
401	"Series 4, Episode 1"	Dave Cohen, Gerard Foster, Giles Pilbrow, Joe Tucker and Ben Ward	"Gorgeous Georgians"	The perils of for-profit fire brigades. The toilet queues in Queen Caroline of Ansbach's court are less than dignified.	9 April 2012
401	"Series 4, Episode 1"	Dave Cohen, Gerard Foster, Giles Pilbrow, Joe Tucker and Ben Ward	"Savage Stone Age"	World of Stone: for all your (surprisingly extensive) stone furniture needs (advertisement). HHTV Early News: Eager customers queue up for the opening of the Bronze Age (parody of a modern technology product launch).	9 April 2012
401	"Series 4, Episode 1"	Dave Cohen, Gerard Foster, Giles Pilbrow, Joe Tucker and Ben Ward	"Woeful Second World War"	German fighter pilots use tourist guides to find high-profile targets during the Baedeker Blitz.	9 April 2012
Song: Woeful Second World War - "The Few (RAF Pilots)" (Take That parody). Performed by Mathew Baynton, Jim Howick, Ben Willbond, Simon Farnaby and Laurence Rickard.
402	"Series 4, Episode 2"	Dave Cohen, Ali Crockatt, Gerard Foster, Giles Pilbrow, Laurence Rickard, David Scott, George Sawyer and Ben Ward	"Vile Victorians"	Victoria and Albert's love story.	10 April 2012
402	"Series 4, Episode 2"	Dave Cohen, Ali Crockatt, Gerard Foster, Giles Pilbrow, Laurence Rickard, David Scott, George Sawyer and Ben Ward	"Terrible Tudors"	Martin Luther's obsession with his own effluent makes a visit to his office distinctly awkward. Henry VIII hopes to do very well indeed out of his appearance on "Cash in the Abbey" (parody of Cash in the Attic). Protestants and Catholics alike are up for a rousing game of Hide and Priest (advertisement).	10 April 2012
402	"Series 4, Episode 2"	Dave Cohen, Ali Crockatt, Gerard Foster, Giles Pilbrow, Laurence Rickard, David Scott, George Sawyer and Ben Ward	"Savage Stone Age"	HHTV News: Bob Hale's Human Evolution Report.	10 April 2012
402	"Series 4, Episode 2"	Dave Cohen, Ali Crockatt, Gerard Foster, Giles Pilbrow, Laurence Rickard, David Scott, George Sawyer and Ben Ward	"Putrid Pirates"	"Historical Apprentice": Team Pirate and Team Merchant vie to move cargo overseas (featuring special guest Chris Addison).	10 April 2012
402	"Series 4, Episode 2"	Dave Cohen, Ali Crockatt, Gerard Foster, Giles Pilbrow, Laurence Rickard, David Scott, George Sawyer and Ben Ward	"Woeful Second World War"	An attempt to foil German railway spies creates unexpected problems for the British passengers. Finding unique ways to cope with petrol rationing (animated).	10 April 2012
402	"Series 4, Episode 2"	Dave Cohen, Ali Crockatt, Gerard Foster, Giles Pilbrow, Laurence Rickard, David Scott, George Sawyer and Ben Ward	"Slimy Stuarts"	Oh Yea! Magazine: Nell Gwynn Special - Superstars of the Stuart Stage! An ambassador learns the hard way just how literally Charles II dines in public.	10 April 2012
Song: Vile Victorians - "Charles Darwin: Natural Selection" (parody of "Changes" by David Bowie). Performed by Mathew Baynton with Jim Howick.
403	"Series 4, Episode 3"	Dave Cohen, Ali Crockatt, Charlie Martin, Giles Pilbrow, Laurence Rickard, David Scott, Joe Tucker, Ben Ward and Raphael Warner	"Measly Middle Ages"	Would-be Crusader Emicho of the Rhineland sets off to find the Holy Land with the help of some very unusual guides. Dominic Duckworth: HHTV Investigates: Dodgy religious relics.	11 April 2012
403	"Series 4, Episode 3"	Dave Cohen, Ali Crockatt, Charlie Martin, Giles Pilbrow, Laurence Rickard, David Scott, Joe Tucker, Ben Ward and Raphael Warner	"Smashing Saxons"	The "Historical Dentist" is confused by his modern patient's false tooth. A famine victim trades his son for ingredients on "Historical Masterchef".	11 April 2012
403	"Series 4, Episode 3"	Dave Cohen, Ali Crockatt, Charlie Martin, Giles Pilbrow, Laurence Rickard, David Scott, Joe Tucker, Ben Ward and Raphael Warner	"Groovy Greeks"	A condemned Socrates patiently explains to his followers why rescuing him would be illogical.	11 April 2012
403	"Series 4, Episode 3"	Dave Cohen, Ali Crockatt, Charlie Martin, Giles Pilbrow, Laurence Rickard, David Scott, Joe Tucker, Ben Ward and Raphael Warner	"Terrible Tudors"	Historical Desktops: Elizabeth I takes her search for the perfect consort online.	11 April 2012
403	"Series 4, Episode 3"	Dave Cohen, Ali Crockatt, Charlie Martin, Giles Pilbrow, Laurence Rickard, David Scott, Joe Tucker, Ben Ward and Raphael Warner	"Vile Victorians"	Shouty Man: New! Great Western Railway. Great Victorian Institutions: The postal service, up to twelve deliveries a day - like it or not.	11 April 2012
403	"Series 4, Episode 3"	Dave Cohen, Ali Crockatt, Charlie Martin, Giles Pilbrow, Laurence Rickard, David Scott, Joe Tucker, Ben Ward and Raphael Warner	"Vicious Vikings"	Prospective Icelandic emigrants make the most of the British real estate market - not to mention the current British tenants - in "New Home Abroad". HH Movie Pitch: King Canute tries to avoid a climactic scene by the seashore.	11 April 2012
Song: Groovy Greeks - "The Thinkers" (parody of "(Theme From) The Monkees", incorporating elements of The Beatles and Monty Python). Performed by Mathew Baynton, Jim Howick, Ben Willbond and Laurence Rickard.
404	"Series 4, Episode 4"	Dave Cohen, Gerard Foster, Giles Pilbrow, Steve Punt, Laurence Rickard, Colin Swash and Ben Ward	"Groovy Greeks"	Spartans have the battle phalanx down to an art - until the warrior on the end notices a problem. "Pausanias: A True Story" tells the full story of the General's badly thought-through betrayal (movie trailer).	12 April 2012
404	"Series 4, Episode 4"	Dave Cohen, Gerard Foster, Giles Pilbrow, Steve Punt, Laurence Rickard, Colin Swash and Ben Ward	"Measly Middle Ages"	HHTV News: Mike Peabody live from the Norman siege of Palermo. Stupid Deaths: Gyrth and Leofwine, King Harold II's brothers, at the Battle of Hastings. Words We Get From the: Normans.	12 April 2012
404	"Series 4, Episode 4"	Dave Cohen, Gerard Foster, Giles Pilbrow, Steve Punt, Laurence Rickard, Colin Swash and Ben Ward	"Awesome USA"	The first settlers at Jamestown, Virginia nearly lose the battle with their own naivety in "Colonisation, Colonisation, Colonisation".	12 April 2012
404	"Series 4, Episode 4"	Dave Cohen, Gerard Foster, Giles Pilbrow, Steve Punt, Laurence Rickard, Colin Swash and Ben Ward	"Woeful Second World War"	The Führer's guards refuse to disturb his lie-in for anything - even the news of D-Day. Dodgy War Machines No. 81: Poor toilet planning on the U-Boat (animated).	12 April 2012
404	"Series 4, Episode 4"	Dave Cohen, Gerard Foster, Giles Pilbrow, Steve Punt, Laurence Rickard, Colin Swash and Ben Ward	"Savage Stone Age"	"Historical Apprentice": Team Neanderthal and Team Homo Sapiens vie to demonstrate who's more advanced.	12 April 2012
404	"Series 4, Episode 4"	Dave Cohen, Gerard Foster, Giles Pilbrow, Steve Punt, Laurence Rickard, Colin Swash and Ben Ward	"Vile Victorians"	A less-than-ethical ice cream salesman. "DI Bones: Historical Crime Squad": The case of the dodgy slum diet.	12 April 2012
Song: Awesome USA - "It's a New World (Pilgrim Fathers)" (parody of "Empire State of Mind" by Jay-Z feat. Alicia Keys). Performed by Mathew Baynton, Martha Howe-Douglas, Ben Willbond, Laurence Rickard and Simon Farnaby.
405	"Series 4, Episode 5"	Dave Cohen, Giles Pilbrow, Steve Punt and Laurence Rickard	"Savage Stone Age"	A chef from Skara Brae dispels the myth of primitive Neolithic cuisine on "Historical Masterchef". The first town planners must explain to skeptical would-be residents why a town is needed in the first place.	13 April 2012
405	"Series 4, Episode 5"	Dave Cohen, Giles Pilbrow, Steve Punt and Laurence Rickard	"Wild Warriors"	Hannibal and his Carthaginian ruthless battle tactics star in the blockbusters "Snakes on a Ship" and its sequel, "Elephants on a Plain" (both parodies of "Snakes on a Plane").	13 April 2012
405	"Series 4, Episode 5"	Dave Cohen, Giles Pilbrow, Steve Punt and Laurence Rickard	"Radical Renaissance"	HHTV News: Bob Hale's Renaissance Report. Mona Lisa grows impatient with Leonardo da Vinci's inability to finish anything, including her portrait.	13 April 2012
405	"Series 4, Episode 5"	Dave Cohen, Giles Pilbrow, Steve Punt and Laurence Rickard	"Awful Egyptians"	Egyptian Make Show: The mummification process. Kids can practice embalming their own dead body with Mummification (parody of Operation).	13 April 2012
405	"Series 4, Episode 5"	Dave Cohen, Giles Pilbrow, Steve Punt and Laurence Rickard	"Terrible Tudors"	William Shakespeare is called out by a tavern drunk and ends up in a battle of insults. Oh Yea! Magazine: Elizabeth I's formidable temper.	13 April 2012
405	"Series 4, Episode 5"	Dave Cohen, Giles Pilbrow, Steve Punt and Laurence Rickard	"Vile Victorians"	Lord Raglan explains his plan to ensure the Charge of the Light Brigade is a complete and unmitigated disaster.	13 April 2012
Song: Vile Victorians - "Mary Seacole" (parody of "Single Ladies (Put a Ring on It)" by Beyoncé). Performed by Dominique Moore.
406	"Series 4, Episode 6"	Dave Cohen, Ali Crockatt, Gerard Foster, Giles Pilbrow, Steve Punt, Laurence Rickard, David Scott and Ben Ward	"Potty Pioneers"	Christopher Columbus insists to a skeptical crewman that he's discovered India - also, mermaids. HH Movie Pitch: Leif Ericsson tries to explain that the film he's pitching about discovering America before Columbus isn't a fantasy.	20 April 2012
406	"Series 4, Episode 6"	Dave Cohen, Ali Crockatt, Gerard Foster, Giles Pilbrow, Steve Punt, Laurence Rickard, David Scott and Ben Ward	"Measly Middle Ages"	HHTV's Royalty Today: Henry II's pilgrimage to Canterbury as penance for the death of Thomas Becket. All your misdeeds can now be forgiven for the right price with Cash My Sin (infomercial).	20 April 2012
406	"Series 4, Episode 6"	Dave Cohen, Ali Crockatt, Gerard Foster, Giles Pilbrow, Steve Punt, Laurence Rickard, David Scott and Ben Ward	"Gorgeous Georgians"	"Court of Historical Law": Tsarevich Peter III brings a case against a very odd defendant. Stupid Deaths: Hannah Twynnoy.	20 April 2012
406	"Series 4, Episode 6"	Dave Cohen, Ali Crockatt, Gerard Foster, Giles Pilbrow, Steve Punt, Laurence Rickard, David Scott and Ben Ward	"Rotten Romans"	A legionary on payday is dismayed to discover that he's on the wrong end of the controversy surrounding the origins of the word "salary". A reluctant army conscript comes up with some truly creative - if not very original - excuses to avoid service. God Compare helps Gaulish warriors decide to which of their pantheon to sacrifice a prisoner (parody of Go Compare advertisements).	20 April 2012
406	"Series 4, Episode 6"	Dave Cohen, Ali Crockatt, Gerard Foster, Giles Pilbrow, Steve Punt, Laurence Rickard, David Scott and Ben Ward	"Savage Stone Age"	HHTV Early Show: The first man to domesticate wild dogs tries to explain why. Mammoth hunting (animated).	20 April 2012
406	"Series 4, Episode 6"	Dave Cohen, Ali Crockatt, Gerard Foster, Giles Pilbrow, Steve Punt, Laurence Rickard, David Scott and Ben Ward	"Vile Victorians"	The Queen is exposed to some of the bugs - and birds - still to be worked out on a pre-opening tour of The Great Exhibition.	20 April 2012
Song: Vile Victorians - "Victoria & Albert: A Love Ballad" (parody of 1980's easy-listening romantic duets). Performed by Martha Howe-Douglas and Jim Howick.
407	"Series 4, Episode 7"	Dave Cohen, Gerard Foster, Giles Pilbrow, Laurence Rickard and Ben Ward	"Gorgeous Georgians"	"Le Survival Guide" gives tips on (literally) staying cool in the French army during Napoleon's march on Moscow. HHTV Sport: Napoleon's famed strategic gifts are no match for the mechanical chess-playing Turk. "Waterloo" tells the very personal story of Le Petit Caporal's last stand (movie trailer).	27 April 2012
407	"Series 4, Episode 7"	Dave Cohen, Gerard Foster, Giles Pilbrow, Laurence Rickard and Ben Ward	"Vile Victorians"	Fashion doesn't equal practicality. Dodgy Inventions No. 84: The SS Bessemer (animated)	27 April 2012
407	"Series 4, Episode 7"	Dave Cohen, Gerard Foster, Giles Pilbrow, Laurence Rickard and Ben Ward	"Rotten Romans"	The Praetorian guard is much better at saluting than they are protecting Emperors - and they aren't very good at saluting. Shouty Man: New! Always-Current Emperor Statue.	27 April 2012
407	"Series 4, Episode 7"	Dave Cohen, Gerard Foster, Giles Pilbrow, Laurence Rickard and Ben Ward	"Shocking Scotland"	Historical Dates: James Hamilton, 1st Earl of Arran, seeks a groom for his cousin, the infant Mary, Queen of Scots (played by Mathew Baynton's young son).	27 April 2012
407	"Series 4, Episode 7"	Dave Cohen, Gerard Foster, Giles Pilbrow, Laurence Rickard and Ben Ward	"Woeful Second World War"	MI5 is willing to recruit literally anyone to help the war effort, including a dead tramp. A Berlin housewife demonstrates some truly outlandish wartime substitutes on "Historical Masterchef".	27 April 2012
407	"Series 4, Episode 7"	Dave Cohen, Gerard Foster, Giles Pilbrow, Laurence Rickard and Ben Ward	"Measly Middle Ages"	A snowball fight interrupts the Earl of Lancaster's execution. Stupid Deaths: Richard the Raker.	27 April 2012
Song: Shocking Scotland - "We've got The Blue-Blooded Blues" (parody of blues rock). Performed by Ben Willbond, Mathew Baynton and Martha Howe-Douglas.
408	"Series 4, Episode 8"	Dave Cohen, Gerard Foster, Katherine Jakeways, Giles Pilbrow, Steve Punt, Laurence Rickard and Ben Ward	"Vicious Vikings"	A "gorgeous scientist" extols the "Wonders of the Viking Universe". Historical Dates: A Nordic warrior outlines his courting and marriage requirements.	4 May 2012
408	"Series 4, Episode 8"	Dave Cohen, Gerard Foster, Katherine Jakeways, Giles Pilbrow, Steve Punt, Laurence Rickard and Ben Ward	"Rotten Romans"	Nero provides typically disastrous disaster relief to the victims of the Great Fire of Rome. Video game: Scorpus Chariot Racer.	4 May 2012
408	"Series 4, Episode 8"	Dave Cohen, Gerard Foster, Katherine Jakeways, Giles Pilbrow, Steve Punt, Laurence Rickard and Ben Ward	"Nasty Knights"	Stupid Deaths: Richard the Lionheart. A Crusader prepares new recruits for the exotic monsters they might encounter in the Holy Land. New! Mellified Man: a mummy in honey that's yummy! (advertisement).	4 May 2012
408	"Series 4, Episode 8"	Dave Cohen, Gerard Foster, Katherine Jakeways, Giles Pilbrow, Steve Punt, Laurence Rickard and Ben Ward	"Gorgeous Georgians"	"Historical Apprentice": Viscount "Turnip" Townshend (special guest Chris Addison) and his Team Whig vie with peasant Team Go Wurzel to negotiate the agricultural revolution.	4 May 2012
408	"Series 4, Episode 8"	Dave Cohen, Gerard Foster, Katherine Jakeways, Giles Pilbrow, Steve Punt, Laurence Rickard and Ben Ward	"Groovy Greeks"	Interpreting messages from the gods. Shouty Man: New! Ancient Greek Tattoo Messenger.	4 May 2012
408	"Series 4, Episode 8"	Dave Cohen, Gerard Foster, Katherine Jakeways, Giles Pilbrow, Steve Punt, Laurence Rickard and Ben Ward	"Terrible Tudors"	The "Historical Dentist" suggests some genuinely disgusting painkillers. HHTV Behind the Throne: Interview with Sir Thomas Heneage, Henry VIII's Groom of the Stool.	4 May 2012
Song: Gorgeous Georgians - "The Luddites!" (parody of early punk rock, feat. the Sex Pistols and The Clash). Performed by Jim Howick, Mathew Baynton, Laurence Rickard and Simon Farnaby.
409	"Series 4, Episode 9"	Dave Cohen, Gerard Foster, Giles Pilbrow, Laurence Rickard and Ben Ward	"Measly Middle Ages"	Edward III's wedding at newly built York Minster hits some unexpected snags. Unexpected snags are also the order of the day for the French side in "Agincourt: The Movie" (movie trailer).	11 May 2012
409	"Series 4, Episode 9"	Dave Cohen, Gerard Foster, Giles Pilbrow, Laurence Rickard and Ben Ward	"Vile Victorians"	Planning a robbery gets complicated when the new recruit doesn't understand the slang. Real Victorian Hustle: A Faginesque crime boss and his small associate demonstrate common street cons.	11 May 2012
409	"Series 4, Episode 9"	Dave Cohen, Gerard Foster, Giles Pilbrow, Laurence Rickard and Ben Ward	"Rotten Romans"	Balding but still style-conscious Julius Caesar invents the "Romeover" (advertisement). HHTV News: Bob Hale's Roman Britain Report.	11 May 2012
409	"Series 4, Episode 9"	Dave Cohen, Gerard Foster, Giles Pilbrow, Laurence Rickard and Ben Ward	"Radical Renaissance"	A young church official investigates corruption at the court of Pope Alexander VI (parody of The Godfather).	11 May 2012
409	"Series 4, Episode 9"	Dave Cohen, Gerard Foster, Giles Pilbrow, Laurence Rickard and Ben Ward	"Gorgeous Georgians"	The "Historical Dentist" offers some bizarre options for cleaning teeth. Changing wig fashions lead to spats among the fashionable aristocracy.	11 May 2012
409	"Series 4, Episode 9"	Dave Cohen, Gerard Foster, Giles Pilbrow, Laurence Rickard and Ben Ward	"Groovy Greeks"	Words We Get From the: Greeks (medical). Dominic Duckworth: HHTV Investigates: Asclepeion doctor-priests - dedicated healers or daring frauds?	11 May 2012
Song: Radical Renaissance - "The Borgia Family" (parody of "Addams Family Theme"). Performed by Jim Howick, Mathew Baynton, Martha Howe-Douglas, and Ben Willbond.
410	"Series 4, Episode 10"	Dave Cohen, Ali Crockatt, Gerard Foster, Katherine Jakeways, Giles Pilbrow, Steve Punt, Laurence Rickard, David Scott and Ben Ward	"Measly Middle Ages"	HHTV News: Mike Peabody live from the last Saxon stronghold on the Isle of Ely. Enjoy hours of fun and conscience-free conquest with Normanopoly (parody of Monopoly).	18 May 2012
410	"Series 4, Episode 10"	Dave Cohen, Ali Crockatt, Gerard Foster, Katherine Jakeways, Giles Pilbrow, Steve Punt, Laurence Rickard, David Scott and Ben Ward	"Groovy Greeks"	Diogenes debates life in a barrel with a startled passer-by. Stupid Deaths: Pythagoras.	18 May 2012
410	"Series 4, Episode 10"	Dave Cohen, Ali Crockatt, Gerard Foster, Katherine Jakeways, Giles Pilbrow, Steve Punt, Laurence Rickard, David Scott and Ben Ward	"Vile Victorians"	Historical Wife Swap: The Tombleby-Pumblechooks of Mayfair swap with the Smikes of the London slums.	18 May 2012
410	"Series 4, Episode 10"	Dave Cohen, Ali Crockatt, Gerard Foster, Katherine Jakeways, Giles Pilbrow, Steve Punt, Laurence Rickard, David Scott and Ben Ward	"Smashing Saxons"	Belief in various mythological monsters badly complicates a journey. Historical Dates: A peasant doesn't see why his lack of hygiene should impede his love life.	18 May 2012
410	"Series 4, Episode 10"	Dave Cohen, Ali Crockatt, Gerard Foster, Katherine Jakeways, Giles Pilbrow, Steve Punt, Laurence Rickard, David Scott and Ben Ward	"Putrid Pirates"	Keelhauling as exfoliating beauty treatment (advertisement). HHTV Cribs: Blackbeard shows off his ship.	18 May 2012
410	"Series 4, Episode 10"	Dave Cohen, Ali Crockatt, Gerard Foster, Katherine Jakeways, Giles Pilbrow, Steve Punt, Laurence Rickard, David Scott and Ben Ward	"Terrible Tudors"	Edward VI's whipping boy, Barnaby Fitzpatrick, faces the wrath of the royal tutors.	18 May 2012
Song: Terrible Tudors - "Mary the First" (parody of "Wuthering Heights" by Kate Bush). Performed by Sarah Hadland.
411	"Series 4, Episode 11"	Dave Cohen, Gerard Foster, Charlie Martin, Giles Pilbrow, Laurence Rickard, Joe Tucker and Ben Ward	"Slimy Stuarts"	Charles II tries to mediate between Royal Astronomer John Flamsteed and the ravens of the Tower of London. Tobacco is the signature cure-all at Dr Culpepper's Health Spa (advertisement).	25 May 2012
411	"Series 4, Episode 11"	Dave Cohen, Gerard Foster, Charlie Martin, Giles Pilbrow, Laurence Rickard, Joe Tucker and Ben Ward	"Nasty Knights"	A Crusader has his old crone prepare some disturbing dishes from the latest campaign on "Historical Masterchef". Elsewhere, another returning Crusader's wife is less than impressed by his latest homecoming gifts.	25 May 2012
411	"Series 4, Episode 11"	Dave Cohen, Gerard Foster, Charlie Martin, Giles Pilbrow, Laurence Rickard, Joe Tucker and Ben Ward	"Terrible Tudors"	The News in Tudor Criminal Slang (with signer for hard of hearing). A spelling bee in the age of non-formalised spelling.	25 May 2012
411	"Series 4, Episode 11"	Dave Cohen, Gerard Foster, Charlie Martin, Giles Pilbrow, Laurence Rickard, Joe Tucker and Ben Ward	"Measly Middle Ages"	Historical Desktops: King John's concern for his social media status leads him to accidentally sign Magna Carta. Jocelin had e-mailed him the document.	25 May 2012
411	"Series 4, Episode 11"	Dave Cohen, Gerard Foster, Charlie Martin, Giles Pilbrow, Laurence Rickard, Joe Tucker and Ben Ward	"Awful Egyptians"	The "Historical Dentist" diagnoses "mouth-worms" as the cause of a patient's toothache. The results of New! Egyptian 2000 hair dye are best appreciated from a distance (advertisement).	25 May 2012
411	"Series 4, Episode 11"	Dave Cohen, Gerard Foster, Charlie Martin, Giles Pilbrow, Laurence Rickard, Joe Tucker and Ben Ward	"Vile Victorians"	A suitor's efforts to warn his beloved's father of a fire are hampered by its very impolite location. House-hunting in the slums.	25 May 2012
Song: Terrible Tudors - "William Shakespeare & the Quills" (big band parody). Performed by Mathew Baynton with Ben Willbond, Jim Howick, Martha Howe-Douglas, Laurence Rickard and Simon Farnaby.
412	"Series 4, Episode 12"	Dave Cohen, Rosanna Lowe, Charlie Martin, Giles Pilbrow, Steve Punt, Laurence Rickard and Ben Ward	"Vile Victorians"	It's always a one-way ticket for the coffins transported on the London Necropolis Railway. Stupid Deaths: Robert Cocking.	1 June 2012
412	"Series 4, Episode 12"	Dave Cohen, Rosanna Lowe, Charlie Martin, Giles Pilbrow, Steve Punt, Laurence Rickard and Ben Ward	"Rotten Romans"	The "Historical Dentist" goes to extreme measures to get ingredients for a treatment. What happened if the criminals thrown from the Tarpeian Rock weren't killed by the fall.	1 June 2012
412	"Series 4, Episode 12"	Dave Cohen, Rosanna Lowe, Charlie Martin, Giles Pilbrow, Steve Punt, Laurence Rickard and Ben Ward	"Terrible Tudors"	There's lots of meat on the menu on "Historical Masterchef". Paranoid Henry VIII demands extreme security measures before he can sleep.	1 June 2012
412	"Series 4, Episode 12"	Dave Cohen, Rosanna Lowe, Charlie Martin, Giles Pilbrow, Steve Punt, Laurence Rickard and Ben Ward	"Smashing Saxons"	When a bank was literally a bank - of earth. HH Movie Pitch: Alfred the Great tries to avoid being typecast as "Cake Guy".	1 June 2012
412	"Series 4, Episode 12"	Dave Cohen, Rosanna Lowe, Charlie Martin, Giles Pilbrow, Steve Punt, Laurence Rickard and Ben Ward	"Groovy Greeks"	Words We Get From the: Greeks (scholarly). "Historical Mastermind": Nikos Ancientgreekios, category "Greek Inventions". Alexander the Great takes the most direct route to solving the riddle of the Gordian knot.	1 June 2012
412	"Series 4, Episode 12"	Dave Cohen, Rosanna Lowe, Charlie Martin, Giles Pilbrow, Steve Punt, Laurence Rickard and Ben Ward	"Gorgeous Georgians"	HHTV News: Bob Hale's Napoleon Report.	1 June 2012
Song: Gorgeous Georgians - "(We're the) Georgian Navy" (parody of "Vindaloo" by Fat Les, incorporating John Barnes's rap from "World in Motion"). Written by Greg Jenner and Giles Pilbrow. Performed by Jim Howick, Mathew Baynton, Ben Willbond, Laurence Rickard and Simon Farnaby.
413	"Savage Songs"	Dave Cohen, Caroline Norris, Giles Pillbrow	"Savage Songs"	Chronological compilation of standout music videos from the fourth series as chosen by the producers. One song is omitted in order to include longer inset skits, featuring puppet host Rattus Rattus babysitting his young nephew. "The Thinkers" (from S04E03), "Mary I" (S04E10), "William Shakespeare" (S04E11), "The New World (Pilgrim Fathers)" (S04E04), "Luddites!" (S04E08), "Victoria & Albert: A Love Ballad" (S04E06), "Mary Seacole" (S04E05), "Charles Darwin: Natural Selection" (S04E02) and "The Few (RAF Pilots)" (S04E01).	4 June 2012

=== Series 5 (2013) ===
No.	Title	Written by	Segments	Summary	Original release date
501	"Series 5, Episode 1"	Dave Cohen, Gerard Foster, Giles Pilbrow, Steve Punt, Laurence Rickard and Ben Ward	"Smashing Saxons"	Woden calls on select members of his pantheon to form... part of a unit of time? in "Weekdays Assemble" (parody of "Avengers Assemble"). A farmer shares his surefire - if ridiculously complex - secret for growing crops with his neighbour.	27 May 2013
501	"Series 5, Episode 1"	Dave Cohen, Gerard Foster, Giles Pilbrow, Steve Punt, Laurence Rickard and Ben Ward	"Slimy Stuarts"	The "Historical Grimefighters" from the Great Plague of London in 1665 arrive to clean up after Charles II's courtiers (parody of Grimefighters).	27 May 2013
501	"Series 5, Episode 1"	Dave Cohen, Gerard Foster, Giles Pilbrow, Steve Punt, Laurence Rickard and Ben Ward	"Groovy Greeks"	Video game: Play as elderly Archimedes and outwit the brawny opposition in Ultimate City Defender. Alms-distributing Aesop ends up on the wrong end of the story of the pretentious fable-writer and the angry mob.	27 May 2013
501	"Series 5, Episode 1"	Dave Cohen, Gerard Foster, Giles Pilbrow, Steve Punt, Laurence Rickard and Ben Ward	"Vile Victorians"	"The Only Way is Hertfordshire": Upper-class women share their most outrageous beauty secrets (parody of The Only Way is Essex). The Beach Watch tries to remain modest and do their jobs at the same time.	27 May 2013
501	"Series 5, Episode 1"	Dave Cohen, Gerard Foster, Giles Pilbrow, Steve Punt, Laurence Rickard and Ben Ward	"Troublesome 20th Century"	Neil Armstrong pitches his Apollo 11 Weight Loss Programme (advertisement).	27 May 2013
501	"Series 5, Episode 1"	Dave Cohen, Gerard Foster, Giles Pilbrow, Steve Punt, Laurence Rickard and Ben Ward	"Measly Middle Ages"	A vow of love means a knight must head into battle with a serious handicap. Richard the Lionheart can barely wait for his coronation to be over before heading off to the Crusades.	27 May 2013
501	"Series 5, Episode 1"	Dave Cohen, Gerard Foster, Giles Pilbrow, Steve Punt, Laurence Rickard and Ben Ward	"Gorgeous Georgians"	Hostile Environment Training: Escorting an unpopular nobleman through the streets of London. Jonathan Wild, Thief-Taker General, hits upon a novel method of keeping himself employed (parody of Sherlock).	27 May 2013
Song: Troublesome 20th Century - "Rosa Parks: I Sat on a Bus" (60s soul parody, including "Respect" by Aretha Franklin). Performed by Dominique Moore with Gospel Singers Incognito.
502	"Series 5, Episode 2"	Dave Cohen, Gerard Foster, Giles Pilbrow, Laurence Rickard and Ben Ward	"Slimy Stuarts"	Highwayman Claude Duval unexpectedly charms his victims.	28 May 2013
502	"Series 5, Episode 2"	Dave Cohen, Gerard Foster, Giles Pilbrow, Laurence Rickard and Ben Ward	"Woeful Second World War"	Dodgy War Inventions No. 92: Bat bombs. The Allied cover story to hide their new radar tracking systems translates to an unusual new diet for German pilots.	28 May 2013
502	"Series 5, Episode 2"	Dave Cohen, Gerard Foster, Giles Pilbrow, Laurence Rickard and Ben Ward	"Groovy Greeks"	CD set: "Now That's What I Call Greek Battle Music!" (advertisement). A bride must transform herself into not only her warrior groom's dream but his double in "Don't Tell the Spartan Bride".	28 May 2013
502	"Series 5, Episode 2"	Dave Cohen, Gerard Foster, Giles Pilbrow, Laurence Rickard and Ben Ward	"Troublesome 20th Century"	The officers of the RMS "Titanic" run through a highly dubious safety measures check. Stupid Deaths: Arthur Priest.	28 May 2013
502	"Series 5, Episode 2"	Dave Cohen, Gerard Foster, Giles Pilbrow, Laurence Rickard and Ben Ward	"Vicious Vikings"	The traditional warrior method of settling a dispute: peaceful negotiation.	28 May 2013
502	"Series 5, Episode 2"	Dave Cohen, Gerard Foster, Giles Pilbrow, Laurence Rickard and Ben Ward	"Terrible Tudors"	Time to get ready for the Religious Switchover (parody of the Digital Switchover). Botched executions are caught on the candid cameras of "Thou Hast Been Framed!" (parody of You've Been Framed!).	28 May 2013
502	"Series 5, Episode 2"	Dave Cohen, Gerard Foster, Giles Pilbrow, Laurence Rickard and Ben Ward	"Gorgeous Georgians"	HH Movie Pitch: Mary Shelley tries for a Frankenstein reboot in which the monster is correctly named... Adam? Brooding Lord Byron is forced to disillusion a breathless groupie in "Twit Light" (parody of the Twilight movie series).	28 May 2013
Song: Vicious Vikings - "Vikings and Garfunkel" (Simon & Garfunkel parody). Performed by Jim Howick and Mathew Baynton.
503	"Series 5, Episode 3"	Chris Chantler, Dave Cohen, Gerard Foster, Giles Pilbrow, Howard Read, Laurence Rickard and Ben Ward	"Awful Egyptians"	The Persian army comes up with an inspired - and very cute - variant on a human shield at the Battle of Pelusium. I Love Cats magazine: Everything the ancient cat-lover needs to know.	29 May 2013
503	"Series 5, Episode 3"	Chris Chantler, Dave Cohen, Gerard Foster, Giles Pilbrow, Howard Read, Laurence Rickard and Ben Ward	"Shocking Scotland"	While on the run, Bonnie Prince Charlie gets some gender-bending assistance from a resourceful peasant woman. HH Movie Pitch: Robert the Bruce tries to avoid starring in "Spider-Guy II".	29 May 2013
503	"Series 5, Episode 3"	Chris Chantler, Dave Cohen, Gerard Foster, Giles Pilbrow, Howard Read, Laurence Rickard and Ben Ward	"Savage Stone Age"	Invention no. 28: Wearing clothes. Testing a radical new innovation in horse riding on "Historical Top Gear" (parody of Top Gear).	29 May 2013
503	"Series 5, Episode 3"	Chris Chantler, Dave Cohen, Gerard Foster, Giles Pilbrow, Howard Read, Laurence Rickard and Ben Ward	"Vile Victorians"	Victorian Word Battles: Charles Dickens vs. Lewis Carroll over their quixotic contributions to the English language.	29 May 2013
503	"Series 5, Episode 3"	Chris Chantler, Dave Cohen, Gerard Foster, Giles Pilbrow, Howard Read, Laurence Rickard and Ben Ward	"Groovy Greeks"	"Greek Come Dine With Me": Great classical thinkers approach dinner with varying degrees of philosophy.	29 May 2013
503	"Series 5, Episode 3"	Chris Chantler, Dave Cohen, Gerard Foster, Giles Pilbrow, Howard Read, Laurence Rickard and Ben Ward	"Terrible Tudors"	Francis Walsingham's postal service advert with bloopers. HHTV News: Bob Hale's Mary, Queen of Scots Report; the Ridolfi plot and Babington Plots fail.	29 May 2013
503	"Series 5, Episode 3"	Chris Chantler, Dave Cohen, Gerard Foster, Giles Pilbrow, Howard Read, Laurence Rickard and Ben Ward	"Ruthless Rulers"	"Gross Designs": Vlad the Impaler takes landscaping to deliberately insane extremes (parody of Grand Designs). Stupid Deaths: Ivan the Terrible.	29 May 2013
Song: Vile Victorians - "Charles Dickens" (The Smiths parody, feat. "This Charming Man" and "Heaven Knows I'm Miserable Now"). Performed by Mathew Baynton with Jim Howick, Laurence Rickard and special guest Al Murray.
504	"Series 5, Episode 4"	Gerard Foster, Giles Pilbrow, Laurence Rickard and Ben Ward	"Slimy Stuarts"	Dominic Duckworth: HHTV Investigates: Charles II's supposed ability to cure scrofula with a touch.	30 May 2013
504	"Series 5, Episode 4"	Gerard Foster, Giles Pilbrow, Laurence Rickard and Ben Ward	"Woeful Second World War"	German attempts to train canine spies get a bit over-optimistic. The story of very furry Polish Corporal Wojtek (animated).	30 May 2013
504	"Series 5, Episode 4"	Gerard Foster, Giles Pilbrow, Laurence Rickard and Ben Ward	"Vicious Vikings"	I Can't Believe You Fed Me Seal Blubber! (parody of I Can't Believe It's Not Butter! advertisements). Erik the Red makes a commercial (and gets frostbite) in an attempt to lure settlers to the "sun-drenched paradise" of Greenland (parody of Iceland advertisements).	30 May 2013
504	"Series 5, Episode 4"	Gerard Foster, Giles Pilbrow, Laurence Rickard and Ben Ward	"Rotten Romans"	"Thou Hast Been Framed!" features the best of royal bloopers.	30 May 2013
504	"Series 5, Episode 4"	Gerard Foster, Giles Pilbrow, Laurence Rickard and Ben Ward	"Gorgeous Georgians"	A noble patron is bewildered by a visit to Jeremy Bentham's office. Words We Get From: Jeremy Bentham. Stupid Deaths: Madame Blanchard.	30 May 2013
504	"Series 5, Episode 4"	Gerard Foster, Giles Pilbrow, Laurence Rickard and Ben Ward	"Measly Middle Ages"	Keeping up with tumultuous medieval times just got easier thanks to "Anglo-Saxon Chronicle" magazine (newsmagazine parody). "Historical Apprentice": Team Johannes Gutenberg and Team Monk vie to demonstrate the most efficient printing technology.	30 May 2013
504	"Series 5, Episode 4"	Gerard Foster, Giles Pilbrow, Laurence Rickard and Ben Ward	"Vile Victorians"	Grace Darling discovers a unique peril of pre-Internet celebrity. HHTV Sport: Live - if disbelieving - with Emma Sharp, the woman who walked a thousand miles in as many hours.	30 May 2013
Song: Rotten Romans - "Crassus: Minted" (parody of "Bonkers" by Dizzee Rascal and Armand van Helden). Performed by Simon Farnaby.
505	"Series 5, Episode 5"	Dave Cohen, Gerard Foster, Giles Pilbrow, Steve Punt, Laurence Rickard and Ben Ward	"Smashing Saxons"	A "surprisingly handsome" scientist extols the "Wonders of the Saxon Universe"; people in Magonia cause storms. King Aethelred is suspicious of witchcraft on first meeting Brother Augustine.	31 May 2013
505	"Series 5, Episode 5"	Dave Cohen, Gerard Foster, Giles Pilbrow, Steve Punt, Laurence Rickard and Ben Ward	"Slimy Stuarts"	Aromatherapy takes a deeply dubious turn with the invention of the Whiffy jar. Samuel Pepys makes some equally dubious publishing decisions as treasurer of the Royal Society.	31 May 2013
505	"Series 5, Episode 5"	Dave Cohen, Gerard Foster, Giles Pilbrow, Steve Punt, Laurence Rickard and Ben Ward	"Woeful Second World War"	Sacrifice your health for your country's at the Sorby Research Institute. Wartime mechanic and future monarch Elizabeth II also stars in a sprightly "Queen-Fit-Fitters" jingle (parody of Kwik-fit advertisements).	31 May 2013
505	"Series 5, Episode 5"	Dave Cohen, Gerard Foster, Giles Pilbrow, Steve Punt, Laurence Rickard and Ben Ward	"Groovy Greeks"	For Spartans, identifying cowardice in battle was simple - or was it? Spartan Girl dolls come with some offbeat accessories (advertisement).	31 May 2013
505	"Series 5, Episode 5"	Dave Cohen, Gerard Foster, Giles Pilbrow, Steve Punt, Laurence Rickard and Ben Ward	"Gorgeous Georgians"	"History's Greatest Escapes": The wife of the Earl of Nithsdale has a daring plan to break him out of the Tower of London.	31 May 2013
505	"Series 5, Episode 5"	Dave Cohen, Gerard Foster, Giles Pilbrow, Steve Punt, Laurence Rickard and Ben Ward	"Terrible Tudors"	Tudor Wildlife Magazine: Henry VIII discusses his conservation schemes - specifically, conserving farmland by placing bounties indiscriminately on the wildlife. Stupid Deaths: Hans Staininger.	31 May 2013
505	"Series 5, Episode 5"	Dave Cohen, Gerard Foster, Giles Pilbrow, Steve Punt, Laurence Rickard and Ben Ward	"Fabulous French"	The Dauphin of France introduces Joan of Arc to his openly skeptical army.	31 May 2013
Song: Fabulous French - "Joan of Arc" (parody of "Price Tag" by Jessie J feat. B.o.B). Performed by Martha Howe-Douglas with Mathew Baynton.
506	"Series 5, Episode 6"	Dave Cohen, Ali Crockatt, Gerard Foster, Oriane Messina, Giles Pilbrow, Laurence Rickard, David Scott and Ben Ward	"Vile Victorians"	Queen Victoria's solemn coronation hits some less-than-dignified snags. Prince Albert's moustaches are ridiculous - until they become the fashion (featuring special guest Al Murray).	4 June 2013
506	"Series 5, Episode 6"	Dave Cohen, Ali Crockatt, Gerard Foster, Oriane Messina, Giles Pilbrow, Laurence Rickard, David Scott and Ben Ward	"Rotten Romans"	Shouty Man: New! Roman Dog, the cuddly multi-"furpose" companion. Cato the Elder and his equally universal cabbage cures.	4 June 2013
506	"Series 5, Episode 6"	Dave Cohen, Ali Crockatt, Gerard Foster, Oriane Messina, Giles Pilbrow, Laurence Rickard, David Scott and Ben Ward	"Gorgeous Georgians"	"Georgian Come Dine With Me": A round of dinner parties with George III, George IV, Beau Brummell, and Sake Dean Mahomed includes a trip to the first curry house in London.	4 June 2013
506	"Series 5, Episode 6"	Dave Cohen, Ali Crockatt, Gerard Foster, Oriane Messina, Giles Pilbrow, Laurence Rickard, David Scott and Ben Ward	"Groovy Greeks"	Alexander the Great's Conquest of Greece board game comes with mandatory multiple expansion packs.	4 June 2013
506	"Series 5, Episode 6"	Dave Cohen, Ali Crockatt, Gerard Foster, Oriane Messina, Giles Pilbrow, Laurence Rickard, David Scott and Ben Ward	"Potty Pioneers"	The "Historical Grimefighters" are there to witness - if not be impressed by - medical history in the making at Alexander Fleming's laboratory. HH Movie Pitch: Ernest Shackleton tries to pitch a thrilling adventure story about not actually reaching the South Pole.	4 June 2013
506	"Series 5, Episode 6"	Dave Cohen, Ali Crockatt, Gerard Foster, Oriane Messina, Giles Pilbrow, Laurence Rickard, David Scott and Ben Ward	"Savage Stone Age"	CD set: "Now That's What Me Call Music!" - featuring the first-ever musical notes played on the first-ever instrument (advertisement). "Historical Springwatch": Exploring the hidden lives of Pleistocene wildlife, if they aren't eaten by cavemen first (parody of Springwatch).	4 June 2013
506	"Series 5, Episode 6"	Dave Cohen, Ali Crockatt, Gerard Foster, Oriane Messina, Giles Pilbrow, Laurence Rickard, David Scott and Ben Ward	"Putrid Pirates"	A nobleman needs pirate slang translated. HHTV Sport: Live from the Pirate Races, riding on captured monks.	4 June 2013
Song" - Groovy Greeks - "Alexander the Great" (stadium rock parody). Performed by Ben Willbond with Jim Howick, Laurence Rickard and Mathew Baynton.
507	"Series 5, Episode 7"	Lucy Clarke, Dave Cohen, Giles Pilbrow, Laurence Rickard and Ben Ward	"Rotten Romans"	Army officers might just be underestimating the possibility of a barbarian ambush in the Teutoburg Forest. An Emperor becomes a legend in "Augustus: the Movie" - with some not-so-incidental help from the guy who actually did all the work (movie trailer).	11 June 2013
507	"Series 5, Episode 7"	Lucy Clarke, Dave Cohen, Giles Pilbrow, Laurence Rickard and Ben Ward	"Terrible Tudors"	"Who on Earth Are You?": Attempting to establish a plausible royal pedigree for Lambert Simnel, pretender to the throne of Henry VII. Henry VIII shows off the Tudor King Lift.	11 June 2013
507	"Series 5, Episode 7"	Lucy Clarke, Dave Cohen, Giles Pilbrow, Laurence Rickard and Ben Ward	"Woeful Second World War"	HHTV News: Bob Hale's World War II Report.	11 June 2013
507	"Series 5, Episode 7"	Lucy Clarke, Dave Cohen, Giles Pilbrow, Laurence Rickard and Ben Ward	"Gorgeous Georgians"	The odd antics of absentminded Reverend Harvest. Some equally offbeat celebrities are featured on "Georgian Showbiz News".	11 June 2013
507	"Series 5, Episode 7"	Lucy Clarke, Dave Cohen, Giles Pilbrow, Laurence Rickard and Ben Ward	"Awful Egyptians"	A cure for baldness might be more trouble than it's worth. A lavish makeup kit turns out to be Only For Men (advertisement).	11 June 2013
507	"Series 5, Episode 7"	Lucy Clarke, Dave Cohen, Giles Pilbrow, Laurence Rickard and Ben Ward	"Measly Middle Ages"	"Gross Designs": Edward I plans a massive extension in Wales.	11 June 2013
Song: Measly Middle Ages - "Owain Glyndŵr: First Prince of Wales" ("Delilah" by Tom Jones and "Kiss" by Prince parody). Performed by Jim Howick with Mathew Baynton, Simon Farnaby and Ben Willbond.
508	"Series 5, Episode 8"	Dave Cohen, Gerard Foster, Greg Jenner, Giles Pilbrow, Laurence Rickard and Ben Ward	"Terrible Tudors"	Edward De Vere passes wind in Elizabeth I's court. Stupid Deaths: Diane de Poitiers.	18 June 2013
508	"Series 5, Episode 8"	Dave Cohen, Gerard Foster, Greg Jenner, Giles Pilbrow, Laurence Rickard and Ben Ward	"Vicious Vikings"	Shouty Man: New! Runic Alphabet. A merchant hawking Old Norse religious relics has to do some fast thinking to cope with the introduction of Christianity.	18 June 2013
508	"Series 5, Episode 8"	Dave Cohen, Gerard Foster, Greg Jenner, Giles Pilbrow, Laurence Rickard and Ben Ward	"Troublesome 20th Century"	"HHTV Sport": Profiling Lily Parr, only female inductee into the Football Hall of Fame. French performance-art sensation Le Pétomane releases - in every sense of the word - his first DVD.	18 June 2013
508	"Series 5, Episode 8"	Dave Cohen, Gerard Foster, Greg Jenner, Giles Pilbrow, Laurence Rickard and Ben Ward	"Potty Pioneers"	George Stephenson makes the case for his railway plans to some very skeptical politicians. Isambard Kingdom Brunel joins the song.	18 June 2013
508	"Series 5, Episode 8"	Dave Cohen, Gerard Foster, Greg Jenner, Giles Pilbrow, Laurence Rickard and Ben Ward	"Shocking Scotland"	Black Agnes defends against the Earl of Salisbury's siege of Dunbar Castle.	18 June 2013
508	"Series 5, Episode 8"	Dave Cohen, Gerard Foster, Greg Jenner, Giles Pilbrow, Laurence Rickard and Ben Ward	"Woeful Second World War"	Interbellum hyperinflation complicates an episode of "Who Wants to Be a German Millionaire?" (parody of Wer wird Millionär?). Gals' Magazine: Yankee Crazy! Comparing the (very) average British squaddie with a shiny-new American GI.	18 June 2013
508	"Series 5, Episode 8"	Dave Cohen, Gerard Foster, Greg Jenner, Giles Pilbrow, Laurence Rickard and Ben Ward	"Rotten Romans"	A farmer protests against the building of the Hadrian's Wall. HH Movie Pitch: Can Julius Caesar's unconventional rise to power really earn him the first movie deal?	18 June 2013
Song: Potty Pioneers - "Transportation" (parody of "Greased Lightnin'" from Grease), depicting George Stephenson, Isambard Brunel, Henry Ford, and the Wright Brothers. Performed by Mathew Baynton, Simon Farnaby, Jim Howick, Laurence Rickard and Ben Willbond.
509	"Series 5, Episode 9"	Dave Cohen, Gerard Foster, Greg Jenner, Giles Pilbrow, Laurence Rickard and Ben Ward	"Slimy Stuarts"	Plague victim finder recruitment comes with some built-in occupational hazards. Charles II's attempt to discourage anti-government plotters leads to some difficulty in securing a hot beverage.	25 June 2013
509	"Series 5, Episode 9"	Dave Cohen, Gerard Foster, Greg Jenner, Giles Pilbrow, Laurence Rickard and Ben Ward	"Rotten Romans"	A "handsome scientist" extols the "Wonders of the Roman Universe". The Battle of Drepanum hinges on the fate of a sacred - and not incidentally seasick - chicken.	25 June 2013
509	"Series 5, Episode 9"	Dave Cohen, Gerard Foster, Greg Jenner, Giles Pilbrow, Laurence Rickard and Ben Ward	"Measly Middle Ages"	The experts of "Middle Ages Antiques Roadshow" assess the value of a well-travelled lump of medicinal metal (parody of Antiques Roadshow). Creating your own miracles is easy with the Middle Ages Magic Set (advertisement).	25 June 2013
509	"Series 5, Episode 9"	Dave Cohen, Gerard Foster, Greg Jenner, Giles Pilbrow, Laurence Rickard and Ben Ward	"Terrible Tudors"	Lord Stanley literally waits to the last minute to decide whom to fight for at the Battle of Bosworth Field.	25 June 2013
509	"Series 5, Episode 9"	Dave Cohen, Gerard Foster, Greg Jenner, Giles Pilbrow, Laurence Rickard and Ben Ward	"Awful Egyptians"	"Historical Wife Swap": Pharaoh Rameses II and Queen Nefertari swap with a peasant family.	25 June 2013
509	"Series 5, Episode 9"	Dave Cohen, Gerard Foster, Greg Jenner, Giles Pilbrow, Laurence Rickard and Ben Ward	"Vile Victorians"	Thomas Edison makes an essential - if rather surprising - improvement to the new telephone. Photographic Monthly Chronicle: Pioneering photographer William Henry Fox Talbot shares his tips for a great photo, including neck irons; post-mortem photography, the latest craze in remembering the dead.	25 June 2013
509	"Series 5, Episode 9"	Dave Cohen, Gerard Foster, Greg Jenner, Giles Pilbrow, Laurence Rickard and Ben Ward	"Savage Stone Age"	Words We Get From the: Stone Age. A cave couple are hopeful of a more permanent home in "A Historical Place in the Sun" (parody of A Place in the Sun).	25 June 2013
Song: Terrible Tudors - "Henry VII: The Original Tu-Tu-Tudor" (glam rock parody). Performed by Mathew Baynton with Jim Howick, Laurence Rickard and Simon Farnaby.
510	"Series 5, Episode 10"	Chris Chantler, Dave Cohen, Gerard Foster, Rosanna Lowe, Charlie Martin, Howard Read, Laurence Rickard and Ben Ward	"Rotten Romans"	Shouty Man: New! Roman Baths. Stupid Deaths: Emperor Domitian.	2 July 2013
510	"Series 5, Episode 10"	Chris Chantler, Dave Cohen, Gerard Foster, Rosanna Lowe, Charlie Martin, Howard Read, Laurence Rickard and Ben Ward	"Vile Victorians"	The mill owner Titus Salt investigates the horrific plight of his own workers and comes to some surprising conclusions on "Victorian Undercover Proprietor" (parody of Undercover Boss).	2 July 2013
510	"Series 5, Episode 10"	Chris Chantler, Dave Cohen, Gerard Foster, Rosanna Lowe, Charlie Martin, Howard Read, Laurence Rickard and Ben Ward	"Measly Middle Ages"	Soldiers are less than impressed to learn they're fighting the War of the Bucket.	2 July 2013
510	"Series 5, Episode 10"	Chris Chantler, Dave Cohen, Gerard Foster, Rosanna Lowe, Charlie Martin, Howard Read, Laurence Rickard and Ben Ward	"Gorgeous Georgians"	"Historical Apprentice": James Watt and Team (Spinning) Jenny vie to produce textiles. "Mad Jack" Mytton's wildly unconventional election campaign.	2 July 2013
510	"Series 5, Episode 10"	Chris Chantler, Dave Cohen, Gerard Foster, Rosanna Lowe, Charlie Martin, Howard Read, Laurence Rickard and Ben Ward	"Troublesome 20th Century"	HHTV News: Live from a schoolboy strike in Llanelli. Suffragettes find a surefire way to reach the powerful.	2 July 2013
510	"Series 5, Episode 10"	Chris Chantler, Dave Cohen, Gerard Foster, Rosanna Lowe, Charlie Martin, Howard Read, Laurence Rickard and Ben Ward	"Terrible Tudors"	"Real Tudor Hustle": Market day scams exploit the greedy and gullible. A forehead brand for perjury proves hard to explain during a job interview.	2 July 2013
Song: Measly Middle Ages - "Matilda(s) and Stephen ... and Henry" (parody of "Mamma Mia" by ABBA). Performed by Martha Howe-Douglas, Laurence Rickard, Alice Lowe and Jim Howick.
511	"Series 5, Episode 11"	Dave Cohen, Gerard Foster, Giles Pilbrow, Howard Read, Laurence Rickard, Joe Tucker and Ben Ward	"Vile Victorians"	"DI Bones: Historical Crime Squad": The case of the baffling velocipede accident. My Little Pit Pony dolls fit perfectly in their accompanying Coal Mine playset (advertisement, parody of My Little Pony).	9 July 2013
511	"Series 5, Episode 11"	Dave Cohen, Gerard Foster, Giles Pilbrow, Howard Read, Laurence Rickard, Joe Tucker and Ben Ward	"Awful Egyptians"	Planning a funeral means it's all in the many details for a hapless husband on "Don't Tell the Corpse". It's fun for the whole literate priesthood only with Hieroglabble (Scrabble parody).	9 July 2013
511	"Series 5, Episode 11"	Dave Cohen, Gerard Foster, Giles Pilbrow, Howard Read, Laurence Rickard, Joe Tucker and Ben Ward	"Rotten Romans"	Stupid Deaths: Pliny the Elder. "Historical Apprentice": Team Maximus and Team Minimus vie to create and exploit a celebrity gladiator.	9 July 2013
511	"Series 5, Episode 11"	Dave Cohen, Gerard Foster, Giles Pilbrow, Howard Read, Laurence Rickard, Joe Tucker and Ben Ward	"Gorgeous Georgians"	Arthur Phillip awaits supply replenishments. Salvation is close at hand for the beleaguered settlers of Port Jackson--or is it?	9 July 2013
511	"Series 5, Episode 11"	Dave Cohen, Gerard Foster, Giles Pilbrow, Howard Read, Laurence Rickard, Joe Tucker and Ben Ward	"Woeful Second World War"	Historical Desktops: Neville Chamberlain gauges the reaction to his new European peace settlement. Winston Churchill, Britain's Wittiest Man, releases his first comedy special on DVD.	9 July 2013
511	"Series 5, Episode 11"	Dave Cohen, Gerard Foster, Giles Pilbrow, Howard Read, Laurence Rickard, Joe Tucker and Ben Ward	"Measly Middle Ages"	Great Historical Country Walks: The 'harrowing of the countryside' (Harrying of the North) wasn't as pleasant as it sounds. The fad for French words causes confusion at a dinner party.	9 July 2013
Song: Gorgeous Georgians - "Australia" (parody of "I Should Be So Lucky" and "Can't Get You Out of My Head" by Kylie Minogue). Performed by Martha Howe-Douglas with Simon Farnaby and Ben Willbond.
512	"Series 5, Episode 12"	Dave Cohen, Chris Chantler, Gerard Foster, Giles Pilbrow, Howard Read, Laurence Rickard and Ben Ward	"Vile Victorians"	Good Day Magazine: Profiling eccentric "Little Giant" Isambard Kingdom Brunel and his many massive engineering projects. Meanwhile, Mary Anning finds much more than seashells by the seashore.	16 July 2013
512	"Series 5, Episode 12"	Dave Cohen, Chris Chantler, Gerard Foster, Giles Pilbrow, Howard Read, Laurence Rickard and Ben Ward	"Groovy Greeks"	Words We Get From the: Greeks. A surprisingly modest - but still slightly mad - scientist extols the "Wonders of the Greek Universe".	16 July 2013
512	"Series 5, Episode 12"	Dave Cohen, Chris Chantler, Gerard Foster, Giles Pilbrow, Howard Read, Laurence Rickard and Ben Ward	"Awful Egyptians"	HH Movie Pitch: Rameses II tries to make his case as the "other" iconic Ancient Egyptian ruler. A prospective labourer is dismayed to discover it wasn't all about building majestic monuments.	16 July 2013
512	"Series 5, Episode 12"	Dave Cohen, Chris Chantler, Gerard Foster, Giles Pilbrow, Howard Read, Laurence Rickard and Ben Ward	"Troublesome 20th Century"	HHTV News: Bob Hale's Space Race Report.	16 July 2013
512	"Series 5, Episode 12"	Dave Cohen, Chris Chantler, Gerard Foster, Giles Pilbrow, Howard Read, Laurence Rickard and Ben Ward	"Measly Middle Ages"	"Making It in the Middle Ages" takes a look at the wannabe cool science of alchemy featuring Bernard de Treviso. Stupid Deaths: John of Bohemia.	16 July 2013
512	"Series 5, Episode 12"	Dave Cohen, Chris Chantler, Gerard Foster, Giles Pilbrow, Howard Read, Laurence Rickard and Ben Ward	"Woeful Second World War"	The war effort cuts into pool time at the Carlton Ladies Club (animated). Expert landscaper Alan Smallbog attempts to demonstrate some further wartime sacrifices on "Homefront Gardening" (parody of Alan Titchmarsh).	16 July 2013
Song: Potty Pioneers - "We're History (The Finale)" (charity single parody)". Performed by Mathew Baynton, Simon Farnaby, Martha Howe-Douglas, Jim Howick, Laurence Rickard, Ben Willbond, Sarah Hadland, Lawry Lewin, Dominique Moore, Alice Lowe and Giles Terera.
513	"Savage Songs"	Dave Cohen, Caroline Norris, Ben Ward	"Savage Songs"	Chronological compilation of standout music videos from the fifth series as chosen by the producers. One song is omitted to make room for the longer finale song. "Alexander the Great" (from S05E06), "Crassus: Minted" (S05E04), "Vikings and Garfunkel" (S05E02), "Joan of Arc" (S05E05), "Henry VII: The Original Tu-Tu-Tudor" (S05E09), "Transportation" (S05E08), "Charles Dickens" (S05E03), "Rosa Parks: I Sat on a Bus" (S05E01), "We're History (The Finale)" (S05E12).	23 July 2013

=== Specials ===
Title	Written by	Segments	Summary	Original release date
"Horrible Christmas (Series 2, Episode 14)"	Lucy Clarke, Gerard Foster, Jon Holmes, Giles Pilbrow and Laurence Rickard	"Measly Middle Ages"	Henry II's unique jester, Roland the Farter, and his tradition of breaking wind on Christmas Day. Carol song. Scary Stories: "The Night Before Childermass" (a poem). HHTV News: William the Conqueror's Christmas Crowning Riot.	17 December 2010
"Horrible Christmas (Series 2, Episode 14)"	Lucy Clarke, Gerard Foster, Jon Holmes, Giles Pilbrow and Laurence Rickard	"Smashing Saxons"	A group of peasants are delighted to receive useful gifts of various types of animal dung (from S01E08). Carol song.	17 December 2010
"Horrible Christmas (Series 2, Episode 14)"	Lucy Clarke, Gerard Foster, Jon Holmes, Giles Pilbrow and Laurence Rickard	"Terrible Tudors"	Mr. Tudor advertises his Exceedingly Nice Mince Pies (parody of Mr. Kipling). Meat, meat and more meat are on the menu on "Historical Masterchef". Elizabeth I's Christmas present is an innovation fit for a Queen - a teeny clock on a strap (re-used in S03E05).	17 December 2010
"Horrible Christmas (Series 2, Episode 14)"	Lucy Clarke, Gerard Foster, Jon Holmes, Giles Pilbrow and Laurence Rickard	"Slimy Stuarts"	Oliver Cromwell has his visiting relatives arrested for wishing him a Merry Christmas (from S02E02). Carol song. Charles II delivers a characteristic Royal Christmas Message for 1666.	17 December 2010
"Horrible Christmas (Series 2, Episode 14)"	Lucy Clarke, Gerard Foster, Jon Holmes, Giles Pilbrow and Laurence Rickard	"Vile Victorians"	A prison Christmas. Carol song. Odd Christmas cards.	17 December 2010
"Horrible Christmas (Series 2, Episode 14)"	Lucy Clarke, Gerard Foster, Jon Holmes, Giles Pilbrow and Laurence Rickard	"Frightful First World War"	HHTV Sport: Opposing sides play a friendly game of football during the Christmas truce of 1914.	17 December 2010
Songs: In lieu of the usual single music video, the often less-than-inspiring origins of classic carols from various historical eras are explored with the help of a traditional group of carollers, including Mathew Baynton, Simon Farnaby, Jim Howick, Martha Howe-Douglas, Alice Lowe and Ben Willbond. These are: "(Not-So) Silent Night" ("Silent Night" parody; Measly Middle Ages); "Bad Duke Wenceslas" ("Good King Wenceslas" parody; Smashing Saxons); "We Wish You a Merry Christmas" ("We Wish You a Merry Christmas" parody; Slimy Stuarts) and "O Christmas Tree" ("O Christmas Tree" parody; Vile Victorians)
"The Horrible Histories Big Prom Party"	Dave Cohen, Giles Pilbrow, Laurence Rickard and Ben Ward	"Overture"	Mike Peabody reports from outside the Hall. Arrival of Queen Victoria, Charles II, and Rattus Rattus. Excerpt from Strauss's "Also sprach Zarathustra". "Horrible Histories Theme Tune", performed by the combined choirs. HHTV News: Bob Hale's Orchestra Report. Excerpt from John Cage's "4'33"". "Born 2 Rule": George III and George IV uneasily share a dressing room. Excerpt from Liszt's "Danse Macabre". Queen Victoria takes her seat. "The Truth About Richard III". William Shakespeare comments from backstage. Excerpt from Prokofiev's "Romeo and Juliet". Rattus Rattus checks in from a box seat. Queen Victoria is offered a selection of odd historical snacks. "The Wives of Henry VIII: Divorced Beheaded Died". Charles II interrupts a mock-execution set to Berlioz's "March to the Scaffold". "Charles II: King of Bling". George III and George IV look over the rest of the program in their dressing room. Excerpt from Handel's "Royal Fireworks Music". Rattus Rattus checks in.	30 July 2011 – Radio
"The Horrible Histories Big Prom Party"	Dave Cohen, Giles Pilbrow, Laurence Rickard and Ben Ward	"Interval"	Mike Peabody meets an Early Man who's late arriving for the concert. Shouty Man promotes the "brand-new" Royal Albert Hall. Victoria, Charles II, George III, and George IV queue impatiently for the royal toilets, behind Henry VIII and his Groom of the Stool. Excerpt from "Marche pour la cérémonie des Turcs". Stupid Deaths: Jean-Baptiste Lully. Mozart and Beethoven have a heated onstage debate over the title of Greatest Composer Who Ever Lived. Overture from Mozart's "The Marriage of Figaro". Rattus Rattus checks in. "George IV: Couldn't Stand My Wife". Excerpt from Mendelssohn's "Wedding March". William Shakespeare and the Early Man find themselves together in a box. Mike Peabody with a breaking exclusive: Queen Victoria is unable to perform; another legendary Queen has stepped in at the last minute. "Ra Ra Cleopatra". William Shakespeare and the Early Man discuss language and literature with great pretentiousness and a club, respectively. "The Ages of Stone". The Vikings invade the stage to Wagner's "Ride of the Valkyries". "Literally (The Viking Song)". The entire cast joins the choirs onstage for the "Horrible Histories Theme Tune (Close)".	30 July 2011 – Radio
"Sport Relief 2012"	-	-	-	23 March 2012
Stephen Fry introduces two HHTV Sport sketches starring real-life UK sporting heroes: Amir Khan takes on various historical boxers and Jermain Defoe meets a Tudor football team. Meanwhile, Bob Hale gives the Sport Relief Report.
"The Diamond Jubilee sketches"	-	-	-	3 June 2012
During the BBC live coverage of the Queen's Diamond Jubilee celebrations, Bob Hale presented the Thames Report from Tower Bridge. Two more sketches - involving Charles II, Richard III, Queen Victoria, and a HHTV News correspondent - were scheduled but eventually cancelled due to time constraints, although the first two characters did appear briefly with a BBC reporter in a "what's upcoming" promo. Series producer Caroline Norris later confirmed the unaired material would never be subsequently filmed, since it was especially written for the occasion.
"Blue Peter's Big Olympic Tour"	-	-	-	16 June 2012
Episode 4 of Blue Peter's Big Olympic Tour featured a new "Horrible Histories" music video, "Flame (It's Gonna Burn Forever)", which tells the origin and history of the Olympic Games. Parody of "Theme from Fame". Performed by Laurence Rickard, Mathew Baynton, Jim Howick, Ben Willbond and Giles Terera.
"Sport Special (Series 4, Episode 14)"	Dave Cohen, Giles Pilbrow, Laurence Rickard, Mark Shillabeer, Colin Swash and Ben Ward	"HHTV Sport"	Live from the Battle of Marathon, where dedicated messenger Pheidippides is about to inadvertently invent what's sure to become an iconic long-distance race... if only we could figure out what to call it...	20 July 2012
"Sport Special (Series 4, Episode 14)"	Dave Cohen, Giles Pilbrow, Laurence Rickard, Mark Shillabeer, Colin Swash and Ben Ward	"Mad Marathon Cheats"	Counting down the top three most blatant, including Rosie Ruiz, Fred Lorz, and twins Sergio and Fika Motsoeneng.	20 July 2012
"Sport Special (Series 4, Episode 14)"	Dave Cohen, Giles Pilbrow, Laurence Rickard, Mark Shillabeer, Colin Swash and Ben Ward	"Barmy Boxing"	Stupid Deaths: Unnamed contemporary of famous Greek boxer Theagenes of Thasos beats his rival's statue until it topples over onto him (S03E02). Ex-slave Bill Richmond revolutionises Georgian boxing with one simple innovation (S02E02).	20 July 2012
"Sport Special (Series 4, Episode 14)"	Dave Cohen, Giles Pilbrow, Laurence Rickard, Mark Shillabeer, Colin Swash and Ben Ward	"Shocking Scotland"	HHTV Sport: Live with the winner of the "twist a hindquarter off a dead cow" event at the new Highland Games (S03E07).	20 July 2012
"Sport Special (Series 4, Episode 14)"	Dave Cohen, Giles Pilbrow, Laurence Rickard, Mark Shillabeer, Colin Swash and Ben Ward	"Foul Football"	Two Three Five magazine: Profiling Victorian-era Sheffield United celebrity goalkeeper William "Fatty" Foulke. HHTV Sport: Live during a rare moment of players not trying to kill each other in a Tudor-era inter-village football match (S02E08).	20 July 2012
"Sport Special (Series 4, Episode 14)"	Dave Cohen, Giles Pilbrow, Laurence Rickard, Mark Shillabeer, Colin Swash and Ben Ward	"Rotten Romans"	The origin of the gladiatorial games involved staging fights to the death at funerals (S01E01). Video game: Scorpus Chariot Racer (S04E08).	20 July 2012
"Sport Special (Series 4, Episode 14)"	Dave Cohen, Giles Pilbrow, Laurence Rickard, Mark Shillabeer, Colin Swash and Ben Ward	"Outlandish Olympics"	HH Movie Pitch: The Baron de Coubertin is forced to admit his idea for a modern Games revival wasn't exactly original.	20 July 2012
"Sport Special (Series 4, Episode 14)"	Dave Cohen, Giles Pilbrow, Laurence Rickard, Mark Shillabeer, Colin Swash and Ben Ward	"HHTV Sport"	Live as the (severely disappointed) winner of the Ancient Greek Isthmian Games is crowned with celery (S03E12).	20 July 2012
In honour of the 2012 London Olympic Games, the show presents a compilation of sport-themed sketches both old and new, with linking segments featuring Giles Terera's HHTV Sport presenter and Rattus Rattus. Includes a reprise of the Olympic song, "Flame (It's Gonna Burn Forever)".
"Scary Special (Series 4, Episode 15)"	Mathew Baynton, Dave Cohen, Toby Davies, Gerard Foster, Chris Pell, Giles Pilbrow, Steve Punt, Laurence Rickard and Ben Willbond	No. 12: Witches. "Wicked Witches"	Witchfinder's Direct infomercial (from S01E03).	29 October 2012
"Scary Special (Series 4, Episode 15)"	Mathew Baynton, Dave Cohen, Toby Davies, Gerard Foster, Chris Pell, Giles Pilbrow, Steve Punt, Laurence Rickard and Ben Willbond	No. 11: Aliens. "Measly Middle Ages"	Scary Stories: "The Children of Woolpit" (S02E03).	29 October 2012
"Scary Special (Series 4, Episode 15)"	Mathew Baynton, Dave Cohen, Toby Davies, Gerard Foster, Chris Pell, Giles Pilbrow, Steve Punt, Laurence Rickard and Ben Willbond	No. 10: More Witches. "Terrible Tudors"	Witches as pets (previously unaired sketch).	29 October 2012
"Scary Special (Series 4, Episode 15)"	Mathew Baynton, Dave Cohen, Toby Davies, Gerard Foster, Chris Pell, Giles Pilbrow, Steve Punt, Laurence Rickard and Ben Willbond	No. 9: "Rotten Romans"	Emperor Nero's complicated love life features in "Love You To Death" (spoof of romantic comedy trailers, from S02E03).	29 October 2012
"Scary Special (Series 4, Episode 15)"	Mathew Baynton, Dave Cohen, Toby Davies, Gerard Foster, Chris Pell, Giles Pilbrow, Steve Punt, Laurence Rickard and Ben Willbond	No. 8: Deaths. "Measly Middle Ages"	Stupid Deaths: Henry I is made fatally ill by a meal of eels (S03E08).	29 October 2012
"Scary Special (Series 4, Episode 15)"	Mathew Baynton, Dave Cohen, Toby Davies, Gerard Foster, Chris Pell, Giles Pilbrow, Steve Punt, Laurence Rickard and Ben Willbond	No. 7: "Vicious Vikings"	Exploring ways to intimidate with war paint (S02E08).	29 October 2012
"Scary Special (Series 4, Episode 15)"	Mathew Baynton, Dave Cohen, Toby Davies, Gerard Foster, Chris Pell, Giles Pilbrow, Steve Punt, Laurence Rickard and Ben Willbond	No. 6: Horror. "Woeful Second World War"	A city child is evacuated to what he thinks is a den of monsters in "The Farm" (spoof of horror movie trailers, from S02E09).	29 October 2012
"Scary Special (Series 4, Episode 15)"	Mathew Baynton, Dave Cohen, Toby Davies, Gerard Foster, Chris Pell, Giles Pilbrow, Steve Punt, Laurence Rickard and Ben Willbond	No. 5 "Angry Aztecs"	"Discaztec (Ain't Staying Alive)" (music video from S03E09, here sped up slightly to fit).	29 October 2012
"Scary Special (Series 4, Episode 15)"	Mathew Baynton, Dave Cohen, Toby Davies, Gerard Foster, Chris Pell, Giles Pilbrow, Steve Punt, Laurence Rickard and Ben Willbond	No. 4: Georgian Art. "Fabulous French"	"Madame Tussaud's Make Show", featuring freshly guillotined models (S03E08).	29 October 2012
"Scary Special (Series 4, Episode 15)"	Mathew Baynton, Dave Cohen, Toby Davies, Gerard Foster, Chris Pell, Giles Pilbrow, Steve Punt, Laurence Rickard and Ben Willbond	No. 3: "Putrid Pirates"	"Historical Hospital": The pirate doctor is actually the ship's carpenter, and he's about to perform an amputation (S02E02).	29 October 2012
"Scary Special (Series 4, Episode 15)"	Mathew Baynton, Dave Cohen, Toby Davies, Gerard Foster, Chris Pell, Giles Pilbrow, Steve Punt, Laurence Rickard and Ben Willbond	No. 2: Executions. "Gorgeous Georgians"	HHTV News: Live report from the public hanging of anti-hero Jack Sheppard (S02E04).	29 October 2012
"Scary Special (Series 4, Episode 15)"	Mathew Baynton, Dave Cohen, Toby Davies, Gerard Foster, Chris Pell, Giles Pilbrow, Steve Punt, Laurence Rickard and Ben Willbond	No. 1: Death himself.	"Death's Favourite Things", parody of "My Favorite Things" from The Sound of Music feat. "Thriller"-style zombie chorus (new song, written by Greg Jenner and performed by Simon Farnaby).	29 October 2012
To celebrate Halloween, Death, host of "Stupid Deaths", uses spooky songs and sketches from past Horrible Histories episodes to illustrate a list of his "Top 12 Scary Things", interspersed with new linking segments from his mum's chintz-intensive home in the suburbs.
"Ridiculous Romance (Series 5, Episode 14)"	Dave Cohen, Rosanna Lowe, Giles Pilbrow, Laurence Rickard, Joe Tucker, Ben Ward, Raphael Warner	"Terrible Tudors"	"Dating in Darkness": Henry VIII doesn't realise that he's been deceived by Anne of Cleves's flattering portrait until it's too late (parody of Dating in the Dark). Elizabeth I's temper tantrum over another portrait may help explain why she never married (from S02E01).	14 February 2014
"Ridiculous Romance (Series 5, Episode 14)"	Dave Cohen, Rosanna Lowe, Giles Pilbrow, Laurence Rickard, Joe Tucker, Ben Ward, Raphael Warner	"Measly Middle Ages"	William the Conqueror skips the charm and cuts straight to the shoving in "Mud and Matilda" (spoof of romantic comedy movie trailers, from S03E11). My Middle Ages Wedding Magazine: All the tips you need to make your Dark Ages day special, including how to make sure the thrown cakes are nice and soft.	14 February 2014
"Ridiculous Romance (Series 5, Episode 14)"	Dave Cohen, Rosanna Lowe, Giles Pilbrow, Laurence Rickard, Joe Tucker, Ben Ward, Raphael Warner	"Rotten Romans"	Historical Desktops: Mark Antony inadvertently demonstrates the (extreme) dangers of online dating when he accepts a friend request from Cleopatra (S02E02). Emperor Nero's similarly complicated love life features in "Love You To Death" (spoof of romantic comedy trailers, from S02E03).	14 February 2014
"Ridiculous Romance (Series 5, Episode 14)"	Dave Cohen, Rosanna Lowe, Giles Pilbrow, Laurence Rickard, Joe Tucker, Ben Ward, Raphael Warner	"Gorgeous Georgians"	"History's Greatest Escapes": The Countess of Nithsdale demonstrates her devotion to her husband by breaking him out of the Tower of London (S05E05).	14 February 2014
"Ridiculous Romance (Series 5, Episode 14)"	Dave Cohen, Rosanna Lowe, Giles Pilbrow, Laurence Rickard, Joe Tucker, Ben Ward, Raphael Warner	"Vile Victorians"	A picnicking couple have a lover's spat over the lady's strict insistence on etiquette, while another negotiates a messy break-up via floral messaging system (both S03E01). "Victoria & Albert: A Love Ballad" (music video, from S04E06).	14 February 2014
It's Valentine's Day, Horrible Histories-style... meaning the course of true love is about guaranteed not to run smoothly. Rattus Rattus presents a mix of old and new sketches and songs on the theme, in-between preparations for his own (hopefully) romantic dinner with new love Ratalie (continued in sequel "Ridiculous Romantics", S07E03, 2017). Song: Famous lovers from throughout history assemble to confess their caddishness in "Love Rats" (parody of "The Love Cats" by The Cure). Performed by Ben Willbond, Jim Howick, Simon Farnaby, Martha Howe-Douglas, and Mathew Baynton.
"Frightful First World War Special (Series 5, Episode 15)"	Dave Cohen, Gerard Foster, Caroline Norris, Giles Pilbrow, Steve Punt, Laurence Rickard, Ben Ward	"1914"	Outlining the causes of the war as simply as possible - that is, not very (from S01E08). A naive young recruit to the trenches tries to learn the ropes (from S03E03). The dos and don'ts of keeping the war effort going strong at home, including a ban on feeding ducks (educational film parody). Image consultants tackle the touchy problem of renaming people and things with German antedecents. "Now That's What I Call Trench Music!" (advertisement). HHTV Sport: Opposing sides play a friendly game of football during the Christmas truce of 1914 (from the Christmas Special).	4 August 2014
"Frightful First World War Special (Series 5, Episode 15)"	Dave Cohen, Gerard Foster, Caroline Norris, Giles Pilbrow, Steve Punt, Laurence Rickard, Ben Ward	"1915"	Computer game: "Flying Aces". Shouty Man: New! WWI Wee-Wee, the multi-purpose liquid revolution (S03E03). Sign up for the Girl Guides and learn to be a spy for the secret service.	4 August 2014
"Frightful First World War Special (Series 5, Episode 15)"	Dave Cohen, Gerard Foster, Caroline Norris, Giles Pilbrow, Steve Punt, Laurence Rickard, Ben Ward	"1916"	Summing up the less-than-encouraging results of the Somme campaign (S03E01). Wartime improvisation is the order of the day on "Historical Masterchef" (S03E11). Boosting morale in the trenches via the satirical Wipers Times magazine.	4 August 2014
"Frightful First World War Special (Series 5, Episode 15)"	Dave Cohen, Gerard Foster, Caroline Norris, Giles Pilbrow, Steve Punt, Laurence Rickard, Ben Ward	"1917"	A general arrives to inspect the troops and discovers just how hard up both sides are for new recruits (S03E09). "Cousins": George V, Kaiser Wilhelm II, and Tsar Nicholas II sing of the war's impact on their family ties (new song, incorporates parody of the Charleston).	4 August 2014
"Frightful First World War Special (Series 5, Episode 15)"	Dave Cohen, Gerard Foster, Caroline Norris, Giles Pilbrow, Steve Punt, Laurence Rickard, Ben Ward	"1918"	The Red Baron's demands for a new war trophy are hampered by a shortage of silver. Trapped in occupied France, Patrick Fowler must find creative ways to hide from his German housemates in "Big Bother" (parody of Big Brother). Scenes from the poignantly pointless chaos in the trenches, in the few minutes between learning of the 11 November truce and its actual implementation. "The Suffragettes' Song" (music video, from S03E08).	4 August 2014
On the 100th anniversary of the outbreak of the original Great War, Bob Hale and Rattus Rattus host a chronological look at some of the more strange, sad, and outright Horrible aspects of the conflict.

== See also ==
- List of Horrible Histories (2015 TV series) episodes
