= Horrible Histories Proms =

British classical concerts for children

There has been more than one Horrible Histories Prom in the BBC's annual Proms concert series. The Horrible Histories entertainment franchise is aimed at children, and these concerts have introduced children to classical music.

- 30 July 2011

It was held at the Royal Albert Hall in London, and was that year's children's entry in the Proms series. Televised as "Horrible Histories' Big Prom Party", it took the form of a free family concert showcasing original songs from the Horrible Histories TV series, along with classical music.

- 22 July 2023

In the 30th-anniversary year of the Horrible Histories books by Terry Deary, a Prom looked at the world of opera. It featured the chorus and orchestra of English National Opera conducted by Keri-Lynn Wilson.

== 2011 concert ==
Louise Fryer and Rattus Rattus (the black rat puppet "host" of the TV series) presented the concert for BBC Radio 3. The featured performers were the six-member starring cast of Horrible Histories (Mathew Baynton, Simon Farnaby, Martha Howe-Douglas, Jim Howick, Laurence Rickard and Ben Willbond), supported by the Aurora Orchestra with Nicholas Collon conducting. The Music Centre Children's Choir and Kids Company Choir served as chorus. Orchestral arrangements were made as needed by Iain Farrington.

The 65-minute televised version initially aired the following September. It featured a version of the concert edited to highlight the songs from the TV series, interspersed with snippets of the classical pieces and specially-shot linking sketches set in and around the concert hall, including ones with Rattus Rattus explaining a historical link to certain pieces.

=== Setlist ===
The concert was presented in two parts divided by an interval. As a general theme, songs from the TV series were paired with a classical piece composed in or otherwise relating to that historical era. Various comic interludes spotlighted notable moments in musical history. Several recurring characters and concepts from the series, including reporter Bob Hale, King Henry VIII and Death from "Stupid Deaths", made appearances.

==== Part 1 ====
1. "Sunrise (Fanfare)" from Also sprach Zarathustra - Richard Strauss
2. "Horrible Histories Theme Tune"
3. HHTV News: Bob Hale presents the Orchestra Report
4. "The 4 Georges: Born 2 Rule" (from Horrible Histories, S01E01)
5. Interlude: George II discusses the role of the conductor with Nicholas Collon
6. Danse Macabre (excerpt) - Camille Saint-Saëns
7. Interlude: A peasant couple offer the latest "scientific" cures for the Black Death
8. "The Plague Song" (from S01E10)
9. Interlude: Life under the feudal system
10. "The Truth About Richard III" (S03E06)
11. "The Death of Tybalt" from Romeo and Juliet - Sergei Sergeyevich Prokofiev
12. Fantasia on Greensleeves (excerpt) - Ralph Vaughan Williams
13. Interlude: Henry VIII discusses his marital history
14. "The Wives of Henry VIII: Divorced, Beheaded, Died" (S01E02)
15. "March to the Scaffold" from Symphonie fantastique - Hector Berlioz
16. "Charles II: King of Bling" (S02E02)
17. "La réjouissance" from Music for the Royal Fireworks -George Frederic Handel

=== Part 2 ===
1. Marche pour la cérémonie des Turcs - Jean-Baptiste Lully
2. Stupid Deaths: Jean-Baptiste Lully
3. Interlude: Wolfgang Amadeus Mozart and Ludwig van Beethoven argue over who most deserves the title of Greatest Composer Who Ever Lived
4. Overture from The Marriage of Figaro - Wolfgang Amadeus Mozart
5. Interlude: George IV discusses his tumultuous political and marital history
6. "George IV: Couldn't Stand My Wife" (S02E05)
7. "Wedding March" from A Midsummer Night's Dream (excerpt) - Felix Mendelssohn
8. Interlude: Queen Victoria cannot perform; Cleopatra steps in at the last minute
9. "Ra Ra Cleopatra" (S03E05)
10. "The Ages of Stone" (S03E10)
11. "Sacrificial Dance" from The Rite of Spring - Igor Stravinsky
12. Interlude: A (musical) band of Viking warriors invade the hall and head for the stage
13. "Ride of the Valkyries" from Die Walküre - Richard Wagner
14. "Literally (The Viking Song)" (S02E01)
15. Horrible Histories closing theme

=== Reception ===
The concert was given 4/5 stars from John Lewis in The Guardian. Describing it as "pitched somewhere between a pantomime, a Footlights revue and an old-school variety show", he added that "it is not clear how much Richie Webb's songs (with enjoyably daft lyrics by the likes of Terry Deary and Dave Cohen) benefited from lavish orchestral arrangements: with Cleopatra's Lady Gaga-inspired theme, or Charles II's swaggering Eminem pastiche, the strings were unnecessary, even intrusive."

Writing in The Daily Telegraph, Benedict Brogan also gave the show 4/5 stars, saying that "the clever touch was to bracket each sketch and song with a smartly chosen selection of classical greatest hits, which the Aurora Orchestra under Nicholas Collon ripped out with élan." He further praised the show's accessibility, noting that "Children who came to see their television heroes were cunningly exposed to music that might in future sound familiar, not frightening."
