= Simon Farnaby =

English comedian, writer, actor and singer (born 1973)

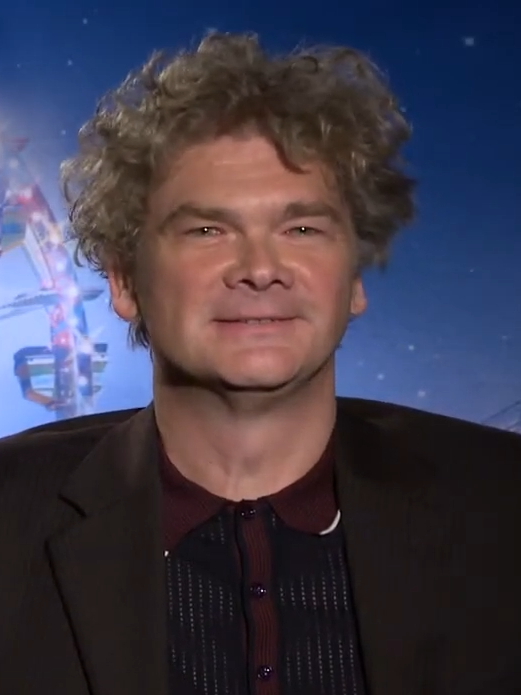
- Farnaby in 2018
- Born: 2 April 1973 (age 53); Darlington, County Durham, England
- Occupations: Actor, comedian, writer
- Years active: 1994–present
- Spouse: Claire Keelan
- Children: 1

Simon Farnaby (born 2 April 1973) is an English actor, comedian, writer and singer. He is best known for his work with the Them There collective where he has written and starred in productions including the sketch show Horrible Histories, Yonderland, and Ghosts, as well as writing for film.

Farnaby earned BAFTA nominations for his writing of Paddington 2, both for Best Adapted Screenplay and Best British Film, and was the winner of the 2023 Television BAFTA for memorable TV moment. In 2023, he co-wrote and appeared in Wonka, a film which serves as a prequel to the Roald Dahl novel Charlie and the Chocolate Factory, exploring Willy Wonka's origins.

== Early life ==
Farnaby was born on 2 April 1973 in Darlington, County Durham and attended Richmond School, North Yorkshire.

== Career ==
=== Television work ===
Farnaby was a long-time member of The Mighty Boosh supporting cast, having had roles both in their series and co-starring in the quasi-spinoff film Bunny and the Bull.

Other notable television work includes recurring roles in the sitcoms Jam & Jerusalem, The Midnight Beast and Detectorists. He previously had a very brief role in one episode of Coronation Street in the 1990s.

Farnaby has presented a number of factual programmes including Richard III: The King in the Car Park in 2013, tracing the discovery and identification of the remains of the last Plantagenet king, the 2014 Channel 4 documentary series entitled Man Vs Weird, in which he travelled the world investigating people who claim superhuman abilities, and as narrator of the Channel 5 docu-series called On the Yorkshire Buses, following East Yorkshire Motor Services.

Farnaby accepted a TV BAFTA in 2023 for memorable TV moment, for a short film broadcast as part of the Platinum Party at the Palace for the Platinum Jubilee of Queen Elizabeth II in June 2022, in which Farnaby played a butler.

==== Them There ====
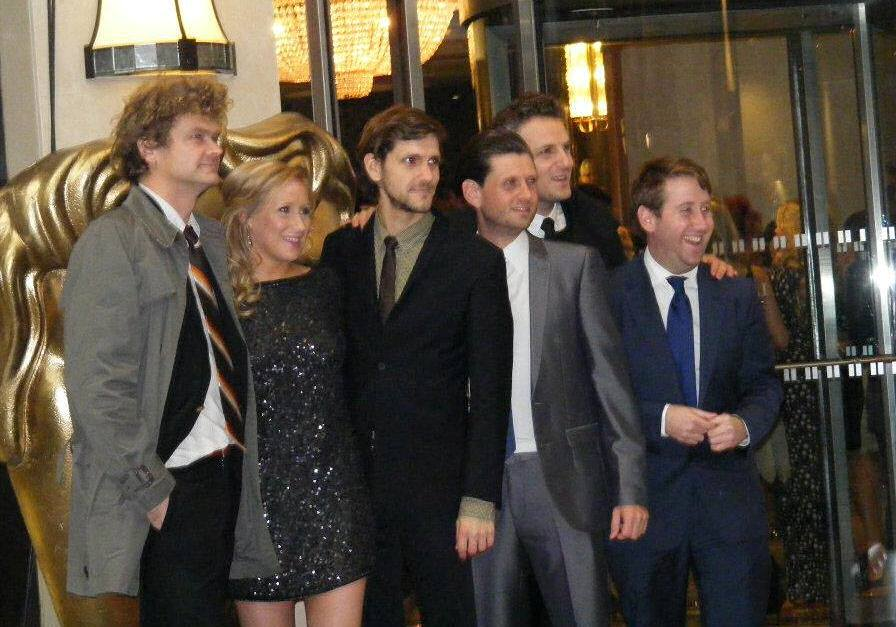
L-R: Simon Farnaby, Martha Howe-Douglas, Mathew Baynton, Laurence Rickard, Ben Willbond and Jim Howick at the 2011 Children's BAFTAs.

Farnaby has worked extensively with the Them There collective of six writers and actors, who started as principal members of the cast of the CBBC live-action series Horrible Histories, where he played offbeat characters including Caligula and Death.

Farnaby, along with the five other collective members, co-created, wrote and starred in Yonderland (2013–2016), which was broadcast on Sky One for three series.

Farnaby had his first major involvement with the creation of a film with the troupe, on the 2015 historical comedy film Bill, based loosely around the early life of William Shakespeare.

The same collective then went on to create the BBC show Ghosts, which ran for five seasons before the team decided to retire it. Farnaby played the fictitious Conservative politician ghost, Julian Fawcett, who always appeared without trousers.

=== Books ===
Along with journalist Scott Murray, in 2011 Farnaby co-wrote The Phantom of the Open, a biography of Maurice Flitcroft, a would-be professional golfer whose unsuccessful attempts to qualify for the Open Championship led to his being described as "the world's worst golfer".

His first children's novel, The Wizard In My Shed, was published in 2020, and this was followed by a sequel titled Warrior in my Wardrobe: More Misadventures with Merdyn the Wild, which was released in 2021.

Farnaby was also a co-author of Ghosts: The Button House Archives, a companion book to the Them There television series for the BBC, Ghosts which he co-wrote and starred in.

=== Films ===
Having previously appeared in The Mighty Boosh, Farnaby was in a starring role for the related film Bunny and the Bull in 2009, where he played the eponymous Bunny.

In 2016, Farnaby co-wrote and had a small acting part in Mindhorn with Julian Barratt, a comedy about Richard Thorncroft (Barratt), a faded television actor drawn into negotiations with a criminal who believes his character Detective Mindhorn is real.

He co-wrote the book The Phantom of the Open about golfer Maurice Flitcroft in 2011, and then started work on a film script of the story in 2017, which led to the release of The Phantom of the Open in 2021, starring Mark Rylance.

Also in 2016, Farnaby had a small on-screen role in Rogue One, as an X-Wing pilot.

The biggest film success of Farnaby's career came with the Paddington film franchise. Following on from appearing as an actor in the first film, he went on to co-write Paddington 2 with Paul King, for which he was nominated for two film BAFTAs for best adapted screenplay and Outstanding British Film. He was also the winner of the International Online Cinema Award for Best Adapted Screenplay, and the Hollywood Critics Association award for Best Adapted Screenplay in 2018. Farnaby subsequently appeared alongside Paddington Bear and Queen Elizabeth II in a short film broadcast as a part of the Platinum Party at the Palace for the Platinum Jubilee of Queen Elizabeth II in June 2022, which won the 2023 BAFTA for memorable TV moment, which Farnaby accepted.

Farnaby is the co-writer of 2023 Christmas release Wonka, along with Paul King, which is a prequel to Charlie and the Chocolate Factory by Roald Dahl. Alongside Ghosts co-star Charlotte Ritchie, Farnaby also has a small on-screen role, with his Them There collaborator Mathew Baynton in one of the leading roles, and starring Timothée Chalamet.

Farnaby wrote the screenplay for The Magic Faraway Tree. An adaptation of Enid Blyton's book series of the same name. The film released theatrically in the UK on 27 March 2026.

== Personal life ==
Farnaby is married to actress Claire Keelan (his second wife) with whom he has a daughter, born in 2014.

== Filmography ==
=== Film ===
Year	Title	Role	Notes
2004	Fat Slags	A ventriloquist	
2004	Blake's Junction 7	Terry	Short film
2009	Bunny and the Bull	Bunny	
2010	Burke & Hare	William Wordsworth |	
2011	Your Highness	Manious the Bold	
2013	All Stars		
2014	Paddington	Barry	
2015	Bill	Juan Domingo	
2016	Mindhorn	Clive Parnevik	Also writer
2016	Rogue One	Member of Blue Squadron	
2017	Paddington 2	Barry	Also writer
2018	Christopher Robin	Taxi Driver	
2021	The Phantom of the Open	Laurent Lambert	Also writer
2023	Wonka	Zoo security guard	Also writer
2024	Paddington in Peru	Barry	Also writer
2026	The Magic Faraway Tree	Farmer	Also writer
2026	Ghosts: The Possession of Button House	Julian Fawcett MP	Also writer

=== Television ===
Year	Title	Role	Notes
1994	The House of Windsor	Sean Sutcliffe	1 episode
1996	Coronation Street	Greg Bamfield	1 episode
2004–2007	The Mighty Boosh	Various characters	3 episodes
2005	The Lenny Henry Show	Twyford	1 episode
2005	Spoons	Various Characters	6 episodes
2006	Blunder	Various Characters	6 episodes
2006–2009	Jam & Jerusalem	Samuel "Spike" Pike	12 episodes
2007	Comedy Cuts	Werewolf	1 episode
2007	The Yellow House	Henri	TV movie
2007	Strutter	Various	2 episodes
2008	M.I. High	James Blond	1 episode
2008	The Golf War	Stuart Ogilvy	Failed pilot
2008	Angelo's	Kris	6 episodes
2008	LifeSpam: My Child is French	Various	Failed pilot
2009–2013	Horrible Histories	Various characters	65 episodes
2010	The Persuasionists	Keaton	6 episodes
2010	Comedy Lab	Old Man	1 episode
2011	Dick and Dom's Funny Business	Various characters	1 episode
2011	Horrible Histories' Big Prom Party	Various characters	One-off special
2012	Dave Shakespeare	Dave Shakespeare	Failed pilot
2012–2014	The Midnight Beast	Sloman	10 episodes
2013	Utopia	Marcus	1 episode
2013	Not Going Out	Scott	1 episode
2013	Richard III: The King in the Car Park	Presenter	Documentary
2013	Richard III: The Unseen Story	Narrator	Documentary
2013	Crackanory	Robert Pickle	1 episode
2013–2016	Yonderland	Various characters	25 episodes
2014	Man Vs Weird	Himself	3 episodes
2014	On the Yorkshire Buses	Narrator	8 episodes
2014	Noel Fielding's Luxury Comedy	George Orwell	1 episode
2014–2022	Detectorists	Phil	12 episodes
2015	House of Fools	Health Inspector	1 episode
2015	Horrible Histories	Various characters	12 episodes
2015	Top Coppers	Dr Schäfer	2 episodes
2017	Quacks	Dr Flowers	1 episode
2019–2021	This Time with Alan Partridge	Sam Chatwin	3 episodes
2019–2023	Ghosts	Julian Fawcett MP	Also co-creator
2021–present	Britbox advert	Narrator	2 adverts
2022	Platinum Party at the Palace	Footman	Paddington Bear sketch. Also writer
2022	Tesco Christmas advert	Narrator	1 advert
2024	Here We Go	Boyd	2 episodes
