= Dan Renton Skinner =

English actor (born 1973)

Daniel Renton Skinner
- Born: Daniel Renton Skinner; 25 January 1973 (age 53); Hammersmith, London

Comedy career
- Years active: 2002–present
- Medium: Stand up, television, film

Daniel Renton Skinner (born 25 January 1973) is an English actor and comedy writer, working in stage, film and television. Skinner often performs as the character Angelos Epithemiou, and is also one half of the Brian and Roger podcast.

== Early life ==
Born in London, Skinner attended the independent Reed's School in Surrey, and graduated with a BA (Hons) degree in Drama from Middlesex University London (1994–97). His credits include the 24-hour play The Warp with Ken Campbell. After this, he started writing and performing comedy regularly with Stephen Evans and Neil Edmond in a sketch troupe called The Benders.

== TV appearances ==
Skinner has appeared in the TV comedies Mike Bassett: Manager (ITV1), The Office Christmas specials (BBC1), My Family (BBC1), Yonderland (Sky1) and Coupling (BBC2). He was also a regular writer and performer on Katy Brand's Big Ass Show for ITV2. He appeared in series 1,2 and 3 of The Armstrong & Miller Show on the BBC in 2007, 2009, and 2010 respectively (initially as "Renton Skinner"). He also played Reggie's chauffeur in the remake of Reggie Perrin.

He has appeared several times in BBC1's sitcom My Family, always as a policeman. He also had a part in the fourth episode of series one of Mongrels as an American reporter, and appeared as Captain Length-Width with his Shooting Stars host Vic Reeves in the CBBC show The Ministry of Curious Stuff. In 2013, he appeared as a police officer in The Wrong Mans with Yonderland co-star Mathew Baynton.

In 2014, he had roles in House of Fools as Bosh and Friday Night Dinner as Jeremy Phillips. The next year, he appeared alongside Katherine Parkinson in BBC sitcom The Kennedys.

Since 2017, he has appeared in comedian Tracey Ullman's BBC One sketch comedy series, Tracey Ullman's Show and Tracey Breaks the News. In 2018, Skinner appeared in the second episode of series 9 of Not Going Out as a madman hellbent on revenge. Beginning in 2019, he had a recurring role in Channel 5 first homegrown drama Cold Call alongside Sally Lindsay. Also in 2019, he appeared in a first series episode of The Cockfields as Ian, an indignant neighbour who has his bordering bush shorn surreptitiously by Ray Cockfield (played by Bobby Ball).

In 2021, he appeared on an episode of This Time with Alan Partridge as an acquaintance of the title character who engaged in chemsex parties.

== Angelos Epithemiou ==
Skinner appeared as Angelos Epithemiou on series 6 of Shooting Stars as a permanent member of Team B, replacing Johnny Vegas. In series 7 and 8, he replaced George Dawes as the score keeper. The character's signature tune is "Drop the Pressure (Jack Beats 'Rinsed Out Rave' Remix)" by Project Bassline. He is (apparently) of Greek origin and resides in Neasden.

Epithemiou is on the dole. He was originally introduced by Bob Mortimer as a competition winner, as well as a burger van owner from 'somewhere in the North East', although this aspect of his character was gradually sidelined. As the character developed, Epithemiou showed an ongoing obsession with Ulrika Jonsson, and revealed that his burger van had been destroyed by his brother Agathius. He also appeared in a series of YouTube clips alongside David Earl whose character Brian Gittins employed him at his cafe, and who was increasingly envious of the fame Epithemiou was gaining on Shooting Stars.

Skinner appeared on BBC Three show World Cup 2010's Most Shocking Moments with other celebrities, reviewing and making jokes about incidents in the 2010 FIFA World Cup. This was one of the first appearances on TV since performing as the character Epithemiou on Shooting Stars.

In 2010, Skinner took the Epithemiou character on a UK tour titled Angelos Epithemiou & Friends Christmas Show; due to popular demand, venues introduced additional dates throughout December 2010.

He appeared four times on Soccer AM during 2011 and 2012, and was a guest panellist on the BBC music quiz show Never Mind the Buzzcocks in December 2011.

In August 2011, Skinner appeared as Epithemiou in BBC Radio 1's Fun & Filth Cabaret, part of the Edinburgh Festival Fringe. He ended each of the shows with a HARDtalk-style interview.

In December 2011, Skinner won the Best Comedy Breakthrough Artist at The British Comedy Awards for his work as Epithemiou over the previous year. In the same month, he appeared as Epithemiou on the Christmas special of The Rob Brydon Show.

In 2012, he starred in his own show, The Angelos Epithemiou Show, on Channel 4. He also appeared as John Meringue in the Reeves and Mortimer quiz show Vic & Bob's Lucky Sexy Winners.

Epithemiou took part in Channel 4's Come Dine with Me on 4 January 2013. He served tinned mushroom soup with white sliced bread for the starter and employed a burger van to cook his main dish. The only dish he cooked was a swiss roll for dessert: however his guests were told to go home halfway through their desserts and had to finish their food in their taxis on the way home.

Epithemiou appeared alongside Debbie McGee on Pointless Celebrities in December 2018, raising money for motor neurone disease.

On 1 December 2019, Epithemiou appeared on Channel 4's Sunday Brunch but only for the start of the show when guests are introduced followed by the first cooking item which he interrupted part-way through by walking into shot to announce that he was leaving.

Angelos Epithemiou’s character and its place in English comedy history is analysed in Guy Mankowski's book Albion's Secret History: Snapshots of England's Pop Rebels and Outsiders.

== Radio ==
Skinner played several roles in the BBC Radio 4 comedy series Deep Trouble, written by Ben Willbond and Jim Field Smith.

In 2014, he appeared weekly on comedy internet radio station Fubar Radio alongside Barry from Watford in The Barry & Angelos Show.

== Film ==
Skinner can be seen in Tim Plester's 2006 short film World of Wrestling as a fictionalised version of wrestler Dave "Fit" Finlay.

In June 2014, it was announced that Skinner would play Simmons in Ben Wheatley's upcoming film High-Rise. Skinner appeared in Swallows and Amazons alongside Andrew Scott and Rafe Spall as a Russian agent.

He also appears in the 2016 documentary Notes on Blindness as the subject, John M. Hull, in recreations.

In 2018, he was cast as "Desk Sergeant Simon" in the Welsh black comedy film, The Toll, that was released in 2021.

In 2024, he voiced the characters Fox and Rat in animated film Fox and Hare Save the Forest. The film had its world premiere at 74th Berlin International Film Festival on 18 February.

== Stand-up DVDs ==
- Angelos Epithemiou & Friends Live (21 November 2011)

== Personal life ==
Skinner is married to comedian Olivia Lee. They met on a celebrity episode of Come Dine with Me, when Skinner was in character.
