= Mathew Baynton =

English actor, musician and writer

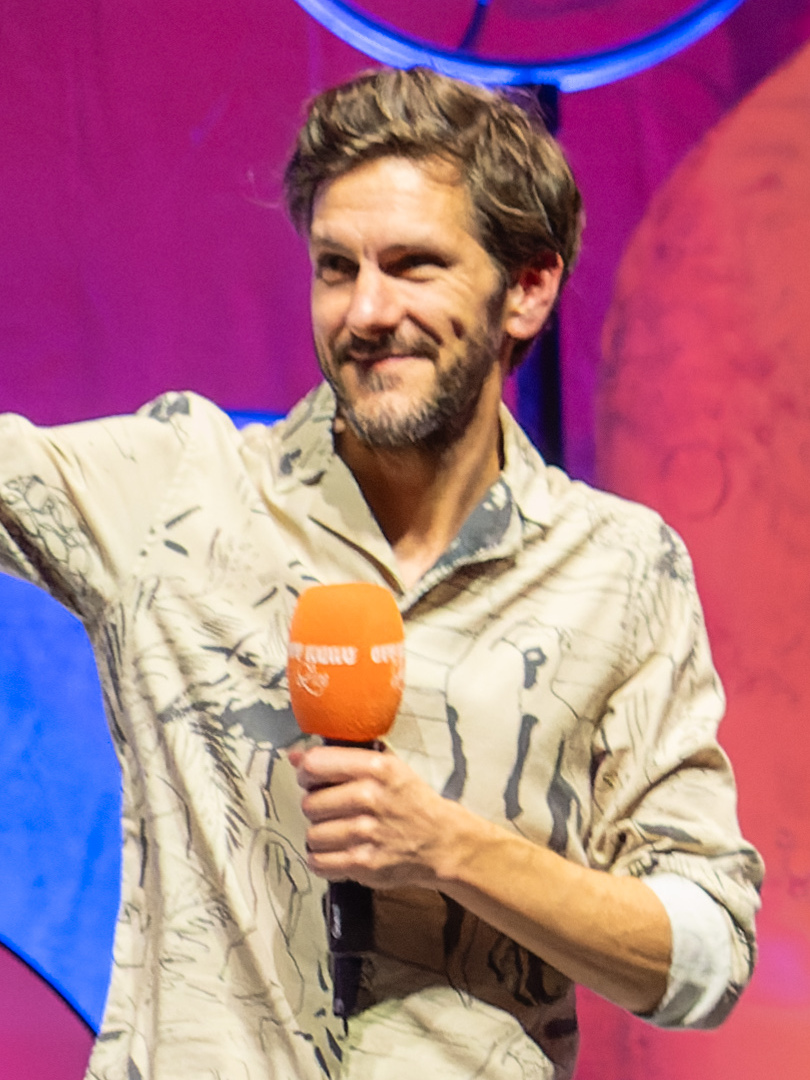
- Baynton in 2023
- Born: 1980 or 1981 (age 45–46); Southend-on-Sea, Essex, England
- Education: Rose Bruford College; École Philippe Gaulier
- Occupations: Actor, comedian, musician, writer
- Years active: 2000–present
- Partner: Kelly Robinson
- Children: 2
- Relatives: Daisy May Cooper (second cousin); Charlie Cooper (second cousin); Trevor Cooper (first cousin once removed)

Mathew Baynton (born 1980 or 1981) is an English actor, comedian, musician and writer. He is a member of the Them There collective, in which he wrote and starred in Horrible Histories, Yonderland and Ghosts. He was also the co-creator, writer and star of the comedy-drama The Wrong Mans. Other television roles include Elliot Ward in A Good Girl's Guide to Murder, Deano in Gavin & Stacey, Chris Pitt-Goddard in Spy, Simon in Peep Show, William Agar in Quacks, and twin brothers Jamie Winton and Ariel Conroy in You, Me and the Apocalypse. He has appeared in several films, including Bill (2015), Wonka (2023), and Ghosts: The Possession of Button House (2026).

== Early life and education ==
Mathew Baynton grew up in Southend-on-Sea, Essex. He is the youngest of three boys, with two older brothers, Daniel and Andrew. His mother worked as a nurse and was a volunteer for Cubs, and his father trained as an engineer.

He was educated at Southend High School for Boys. He graduated with first class honours from the Rose Bruford College of Speech and Drama, and later trained in clowning at École Philippe Gaulier in Paris.

Baynton's second cousins Daisy May Cooper and Charlie Cooper are also in the acting profession. Trevor Cooper is his first cousin once removed.

== Career ==
=== Acting and writing ===
Baynton is one of the performers of the children's television series Horrible Histories, appearing in the first five series as an actor, singer, and occasional writer. Baynton and the other five members of the main Horrible Histories cast form the Them There troupe, which has since created other shows.

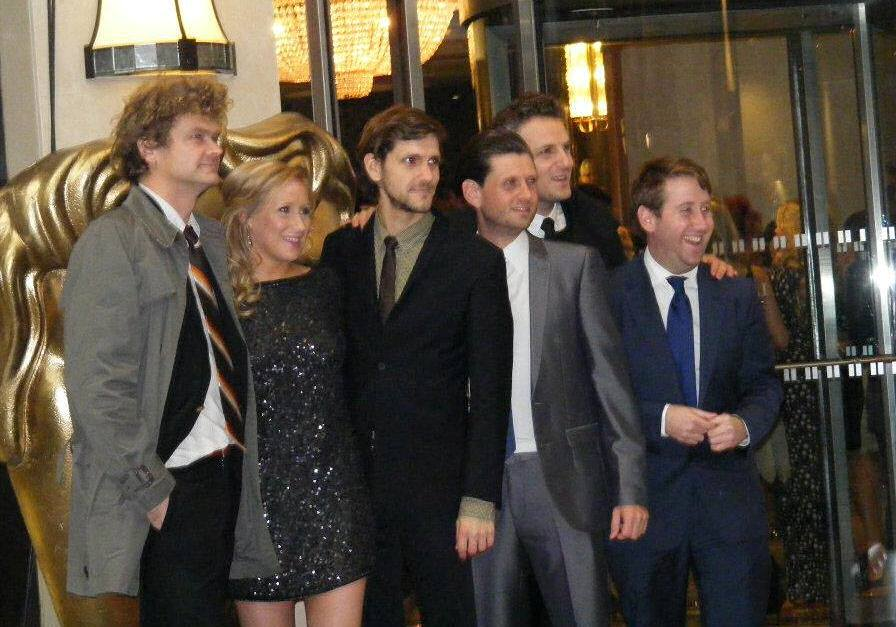
L-R: Simon Farnaby, Martha Howe-Douglas, Mathew Baynton, Laurence Rickard, Ben Willbond and Jim Howick at the 2011 Children's BAFTAs.

Along with the other members of the troupe, Baynton is the creator, writer, and star of Yonderland, a family fantasy comedy series that premiered on Sky One on 10 November 2013. He starred with the same troupe in Bill, a BBC family comedy film based loosely around the early life of William Shakespeare, who ventures to London to pursue his dream of becoming a playwright. The troupe also reunited in 2019 to create the BBC series Ghosts, with Baynton appearing as a Romantic poet named Thomas Thorne.

Baynton teamed with friend and fellow Gavin & Stacey alumnus James Corden to create, write, and star in The Wrong Mans, a comedy thriller for BBC Two that premiered in autumn 2013. The series is co-produced by online television provider Hulu.com in the United States, where it premiered in November 2013. The first six-part series proved a critical and commercial success, and a similarly well-received two-part sequel was broadcast in December 2014.

Other notable TV comedy roles include Deano in Gavin & Stacey; Chris in the Darren Boyd sitcom vehicle Spy; and William in the 2017 black comedy series Quacks.

In 2009, he appeared in a music video for Mercury Prize-nominated band The Bees.

Baynton appeared at the 2013 Edinburgh Fringe Festival, starring in the world premiere of Tom Basden's play Holes. He reprised his role of Gus in a London revival of the same play in summer 2014.

In late 2015, Baynton portrayed Jamie Winton and his brother Ariel Conroy in Sky One's science fiction comedy-drama miniseries You, Me and the Apocalypse.

In January 2024, Baynton made his Royal Shakespeare Company debut in Eleanor Rhode's production of A Midsummer Night's Dream as Nick Bottom at the Royal Shakespeare Theatre, Stratford-upon-Avon, before transferring to the Barbican Centre in December 2024.

In January 2025, it was announced that Baynton would appear as a contestant on the nineteenth series of the Channel 4 show Taskmaster alongside Fatiha El-Ghorri, Jason Mantzoukas, Rosie Ramsey, and Stevie Martin. Baynton would go on to win the series. Bayton also participated in Taskmaster Champion of Champions 4, which aired in December 2025. He won, beating Andy Zaltzman, Maisie Adam, Sam Campbell and John Robins.

=== Music ===
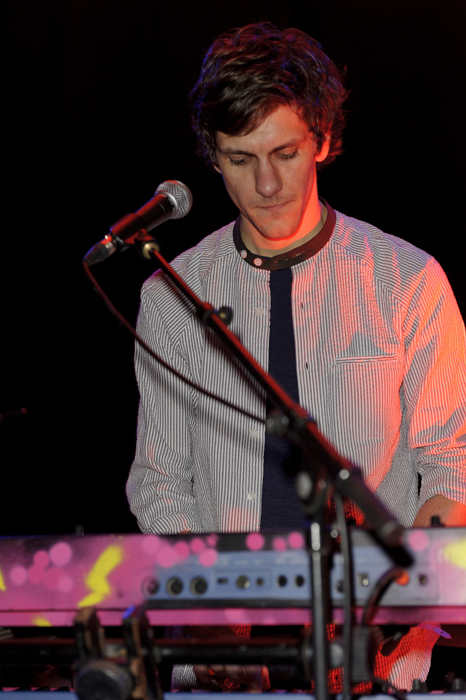
Baynton at the 2011 Glasgow Film Festival

Baynton is a former member of the band Special Benny as a vocalist and guitarist. Their debut album Toys was released in 2010.

He has also performed as a solo act under the name Dog Ears. His debut solo EP, So It Goes, was released in November 2011. It consists of four self-penned songs.

=== Radio ===
He appeared in John Finnemore's Double Acts.

== Personal life ==
Baynton and his partner Kelly Robinson, a film historian, have two children. Baynton and Robinson had a civil partnership ceremony in 2023.

Baynton said in a 2013 interview that he would be happy for his son to become an actor, if he enjoyed acting. He tries to keep his children out of the spotlight; however, he raised awareness about breaking gender stereotypes after his son was mocked for wearing a pink bicycle helmet.

Baynton has described his diet as mainly plant-based. He supports Tottenham Hotspur.

== Acting credits ==
Key
†	Denotes films that have not yet been released

=== Film ===
Year	Film	Role	Notes
2008	1234	Neil	
2008	Telstar	Ritchie Blackmore	
2009	City Rats	Barista	
2010	Hereafter	College Receptionist	
2011	Tooty's Wedding	Aiden	Short film
2011	You Instead	Tyko	
2014	The Falling	Mr. Hopkins	
2015	Bill	William "Bill" Shakespeare / Lord Burghley / English Messenger / Customs Official	
2023	Wonka	Felix Fickelgruber	
2025	A Midsummer Night's Dream	Nick Bottom	Filmed live in the Royal Shakespeare Theatre in 2024
2026	Ghosts: The Possession of Button House	Thomas Thorne	

=== Television ===
Year	Title	Role	Notes
2007	Roman's Empire	Davvy	Episode #1.4
2007	Learners	Howard	Television film
2008	Ashes to Ashes	Tom Robinson	Episode #1.8
2008–2009	Gavin & Stacey	Deano	3 episodes
2009	Horne & Corden	Various roles	6 episodes
2009	Doc Martin	Junior Chef	Episode: "Do Not Disturb"
2009	Purves & Pekkala	Derrin	Television film
2009	Brave Young Men	Dylan	Television film
2009–2010	The Armstrong & Miller Show	Various roles	2 episodes
2009–2013	Horrible Histories	Various roles	46 episodes
2010	The Stephen K. Amos Show	Whale Charity Fundraiser	Episode #1.4
2010–2012	Peep Show	Simon	4 episodes
2011	Horrible Histories with Stephen Fry	Various roles	Episode #1.1
2011	BBC Proms	Various roles	Episode: "Prom 20: Horrible Histories Big Prom Party"
2011–2012	Spy	Chris Pitt-Goddard	16 episodes
2013	A Christmas Panic!	Various	English dub of the Christmas special of "A Town Called Panic"
2013–2014	The Wrong Mans	Sam Pinkett	10 episodes
2013–2014	Psychobitches	Jesus / Witch of Wookey Hole	2 episodes
2013–2016	Yonderland	Various roles	25 episodes
2014	Blandings	Pongo	Episode: "Throwing Eggs"
2015	You, Me and the Apocalypse	Jamie Winton/Ariel Conroy	10 episodes
2015–2017	Bob the Builder	Roland	Voice role; 5 episodes
2016	Year Friends	Reporter	Episode: "December"
2016–2017	Drunk History	Various roles	4 episodes
2017	Inside No. 9	Ted	Episode: "Diddle Diddle Dumpling"
2017	Quacks	William	6 episodes
2017	Thunderbirds Are Go	Jimmy/Crewman Hooper	Episode: "Rigged for Disaster"
2018	Pixies	Tatum	1 episode
2018	Vanity Fair	Bute Crawley	Miniseries; 4 episodes
2018–2020	The Split	Rex Pope	5 episodes
2019	Urban Myths	Kenny Everett	2 episodes
2019–2023	Ghosts	Thomas Thorne	35 episodes
2021	Hitmen	Kieran Roberts	Episode: "Impersonation"
2021	Death in Paradise	Colin Babcock	Episode: "Christmas Special"
2022	Ghosts	Actor Pete	Episode: "Dumb Deaths"
2022–2024	The Heroic Quest of the Valiant Prince Ivandoe	Additional voices	
2023	Murder Is Easy	Dr. Thomas	Miniseries; 2 episodes
2024	A Good Girl's Guide to Murder	Elliot Ward	6 episodes
2025	Taskmaster	Himself	11 episodes
2026	MaeBee	Da-Nono	24 episodes
†2026	Up To No Good	Paul Oyle	6 episodes; Announced 12 May 2026
†2027	The Cadburys	Joseph Rowntree	6 episodes; Announced 7 July 2026

=== Theatre ===
Year	Title	Role	Venue	Notes
2003	Loot	Meadows & Mrs. McLeavy	Derby Playhouse, Derby	
2005	The Bubonic Play	Minstrel	Pleasance Dome, Edinburgh	as part of Edinburgh Festival Fringe
2006	Hello Dalai	Various Roles	Underbelly, Edinburgh	as part of Edinburgh Festival Fringe
2007	Office Party		Barbican Centre, London	
2011	Horrible Histories: BBC Proms 2011	Various Roles	Royal Albert Hall, London	as part of BBC Proms
2013	Holes	Gus	Assembly George Square Studios, Edinburgh	as part of Edinburgh Festival Fringe
2024	A Midsummer Night's Dream	Bottom	Royal Shakespeare Theatre, Stratford-upon-Avon	Royal Shakespeare Company debut
2024	White Rabbit Red Rabbit	Performer	@sohoplace	One-night only performance
2024–2025	A Midsummer Night's Dream	Bottom	Barbican Centre, London	Transfer of Royal Shakespeare Company production
2025	Inside No. 9 Stage/Fright	Guest star	Wyndham's Theatre, London	One-night only performance
2026	An Oak Tree	Performer	The Other Palace, London	One-night only performance

=== Radio ===
Year	Title	Role	Ref.
2012	Before They Were Famous	Hunter S. Thompson/Cormac McCarthy	
2012	Party	Guest	
2013	Hard To Tell	The Vicar	
2015	Double Acts	Mike	
2015–2021	Reluctant Persuaders	Joe Starling	
2016	Maternal Pride	Narrator	
2016	Pepys: After the Fire	John Evelyn	
2016	Forty Weeks	Sam	
2017	Human Resources	Dylan	
2018	My Boy Jack	Reader	
2018	The Importance of Being Earnest	Algernon	
2019	Rosencrantz and Guildenstern Are Dead	Rosencrantz	
2022	The Miser	Valère	
2022	The World of Simon Rich	Various characters	
2023	She Stoops to Conquer	Marlow	
2026	The Circle	Reader	
2026	Transcendental Wild Oats	Charles Lane	

== Awards and nominations ==
Year	Award	Category	Work	Result	Ref.
2006	Fringe Report Awards	Best Farce (with all crew & cast)	The Bubonic Play	Won	
2010	British Academy Children's Awards	Best Writing (with writing team)	Horrible Histories - Series 2	Won	
2011	British Comedy Awards	Best Sketch Show (with writing team)	Horrible Histories - Series 2	Won	
2012	British Academy Children's Awards	Best Performer	Horrible Histories	Nominated	
2014	RTS Programme Awards	Best Writer – Comedy (with James Corden & Tom Basden)	The Wrong Mans	Won	
2014	British Academy Television Craft Awards	Best Writer – Comedy (with James Corden)	The Wrong Mans	Nominated	
2014	British Academy Television Awards	Best Male Comedy Performance	The Wrong Mans	Nominated	
2014	Satellite Awards	Best Television Series – Musical or Comedy	The Wrong Mans	Nominated	
2014	Satellite Awards	Best Actor – Television Series Musical or Comedy	The Wrong Mans	Nominated	
2014	British Comedy Awards	Best New Comedy Programme (with James Corden)	The Wrong Mans	Nominated	
2014	BANFF World Media Rockie Awards	Best Sitcom	The Wrong Mans	Nominated	
2015	British Academy Television Craft Awards	Best Writer – Comedy (with James Corden)	The Wrong Mans (Episode: "X-Mans")	Nominated	
2015	British Academy Television Awards	Best Scripted Comedy (with Jim Field Smith & James Corden)	The Wrong Mans	Nominated	
2022	National Comedy Awards	Outstanding Comedy Actor	Ghosts	Nominated	
