= Jim Howick =

British actor

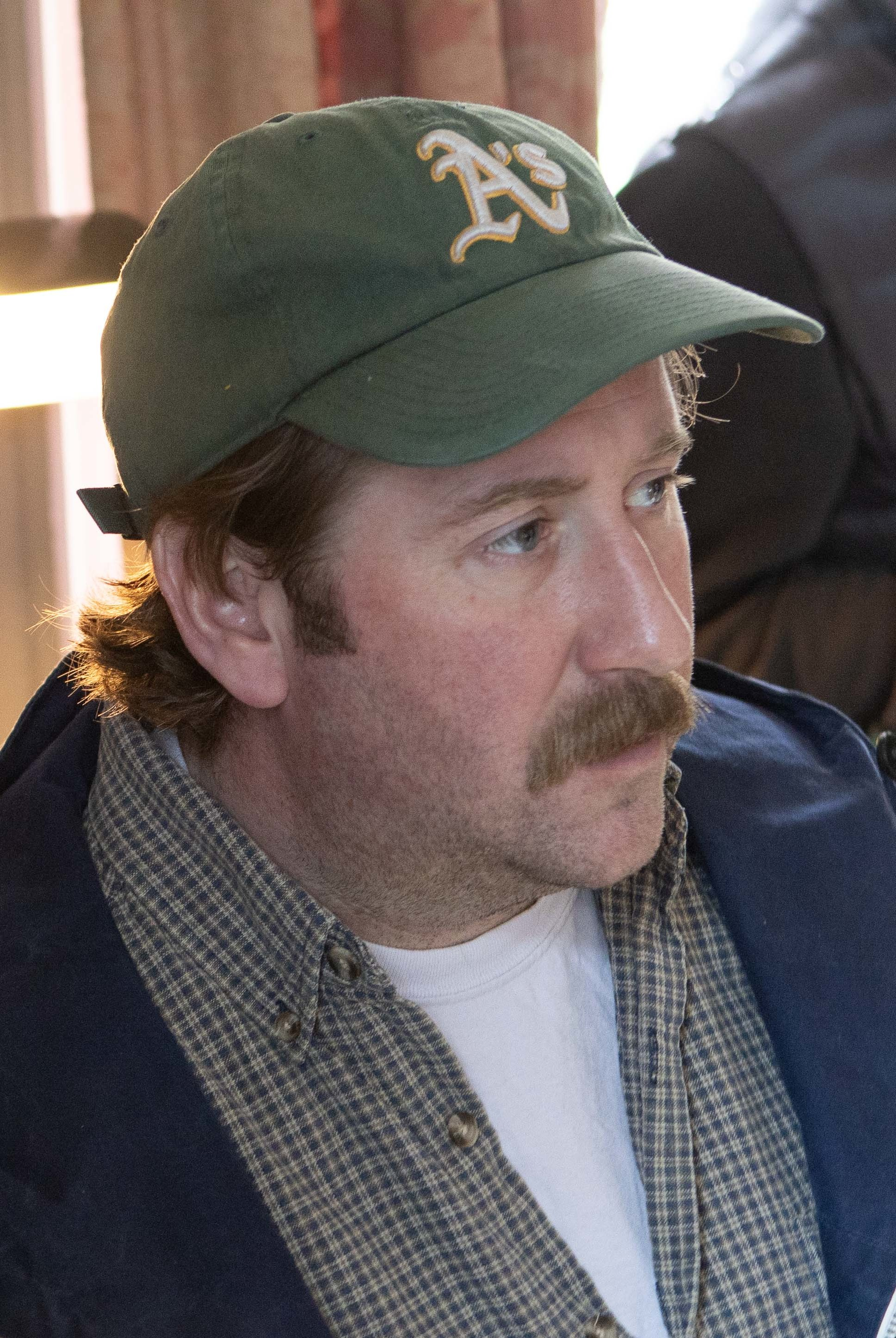
- Howick in 2020
- Born: James Howick; 14 May 1979 (age 47); Chichester, West Sussex, England
- Education: Mountview Academy of Theatre Arts
- Occupations: Actor; writer
- Years active: 1997–present

James Howick (born 14 May 1979) is an English actor and writer, known for his appearances in television series such as Peep Show (2007–2012), Sex Education (2019–2022), and Here We Go (2022–present). Howick is additionally associated with the creative collective Them There, with whom he has written and starred in productions including Horrible Histories (2009–2013), Yonderland (2013–2016), Ghosts (2019–2023), and Ghosts: The Possession of Button House (2026).

== Early life ==
James Howick was born in Chichester, West Sussex on 14 May 1979, but grew up in Bognor Regis. He was educated at The Regis School. He graduated with First Class Honours from Mountview Academy of Theatre Arts in 2000.

== Career ==
Along with the five other members of the Horrible Histories starring cast, which includes Ben Willbond, Martha Howe-Douglas, Mathew Baynton, Simon Farnaby and Laurence Rickard, Howick is also the co-creator, -writer and -star of Yonderland, an eight-part family fantasy comedy series that premiered on Sky One on 10 November 2013. He co-starred with the same troupe in Bill, a BBC-produced comedy film based loosely around the early life of William Shakespeare. Other prominent television roles include Gerard in Peep Show, Gerry in Danny Boyle's Babylon and Anthony in the revival of Reggie Perrin. In addition he has been a regular guest star in various sketch comedies, including The Armstrong and Miller Show and The Kevin Bishop Show. In 2017, he played Aaron Mayford in the ITV thriller Broadchurch. From 2019 to 2023, Howick featured in the Netflix original series Sex Education as Mr Hendricks, a science teacher at Moordale Secondary School who also conducts the Swing Band. Howick is the co-creator, co-writer and co-star of the BBC One sitcom Ghosts, - Howick plays numerous characters, but is mostly known for his role as Patrick Butcher, a 1980s Scout Master who was killed in an archery accident - the show was first broadcast in 2019 and ran for five series. More recently, Howick was cast in the 2022 BBC comedy series Here We Go in which he plays Paul Jessop.

In film, Howick played Cpl. Matlin in the 2004 Guillermo del Toro adaptation of Hellboy.

== Personal life ==
Howick met his wife, Lauren, on the set of Reggie Perrin. They married in 2012 and live in East Finchley, London.

Howick is an avid Star Wars fan. He's also a lifelong fan of Tottenham Hotspur.

== Filmography ==
=== Film ===
Year	Title	Role	Notes
2004	Hellboy	Cpl. Matlin	
2006	Tokyo Jim	Jim	
2015	Bill	Various	
2017	Journey Beyond Sodor	Hurricane	Voice role
2026	Ghosts: The Possession of Button House	Pat Butcher	

=== Television ===
Year	Title	Role	Notes
1997	Armstrong and Miller	Various	Episode: "#2.1"
2007	The History of the World Backwards	Various	
2007	Hyperdrive	Swamp Creature	
2007	Comedy Showcase	Various	
2007–2010	The Armstrong and Miller Show	Various	
2007–2012	Peep Show	Gerard	
2008	Mutual Friends	Estate Agent	Episode: "#1.3"
2008–2009	No Heroics	Thundermonkey	
2008–2009	The Kevin Bishop Show	Various	
2009–2010	Reggie Perrin	Anthony	
2009–2013	Horrible Histories	Various	
2010	Hounded	The British Prime Minister	
2010	The Increasingly Poor Decisions of Todd Margaret	Taxi Driver	
2011	BBC Proms	Various	Prom 20: "Horrible Histories Big Prom Party"
2013	A Christmas Panic!	Various	English dub of the Christmas special of "A Town Called Panic"
2013–2014	The Wrong Mans	Chris	
2013–2016	Yonderland	Various	
2015	Horrible Histories	Various, including Napoleon Bonaparte & Winston Churchill	
2015	Inside No. 9	Thomas Nutter	Episode: "The Trial of Elizabeth Gadge"
2015–2017	Scream Street	Mr. Watson	
2016	Stag	Ian	
2016	The Aliens	Dominic	
2016	Airmageddon	Commentator	Series 2
2017	Broadchurch	Aaron Mayford	Series 3
2017	Loaded	Josh	
2017	Action Team	Graham	6 Episodes
2018	Wannabe	Mikey	4 Episodes
2019–2023	Sex Education	Colin Hendricks	Recurring role; 20 episodes
2019–2023	Ghosts	Pat Butcher	5 series
2020	Pandemonium	Paul Jessop	Pilot episode of Here We Go
2022–present	Here We Go	Paul Jessop	3 series
2023–present	The Change	The Verderer	TV series
2024	3 Body Problem	Harry	
2024	Death in Paradise	Jamie Barton	2024 Christmas Special
2025	The Great Stand Up to Cancer Bake Off	Himself; contestant	
2025	Austin	Gawain, Tour Guide	
2025	Death Valley	Atkins	3 episodes

== Awards ==
In 2010, Howick won a Children's BAFTA for his performance in the second series of the CBBC television series Horrible Histories. In 2026, he was nominated for the British Academy Television Award for Best Male Comedy Performance for Here We Go.
