= Them There =

Group of British comedians, writers, and actors

- Them There logo
- Notable work: Horrible Histories (2009–2015); Yonderland (2013–2016); Bill (2015); Ghosts (2019–2023)

Comedy career
- Years active: 2009–present
- Medium: Television; film
- Genres: Satire; surreal humour; black comedy
- Members: Mathew Baynton; Simon Farnaby; Martha Howe-Douglas; Jim Howick; Laurence Rickard; Ben Willbond

Them There is a theatrical production collective made up of a group of comedy writers and performers, notable for working on a range of projects together including the first five series of Horrible Histories, Yonderland and Ghosts. They are also informally referred to as the Horrible Histories troupe and The Six Idiots.

== Collective ==
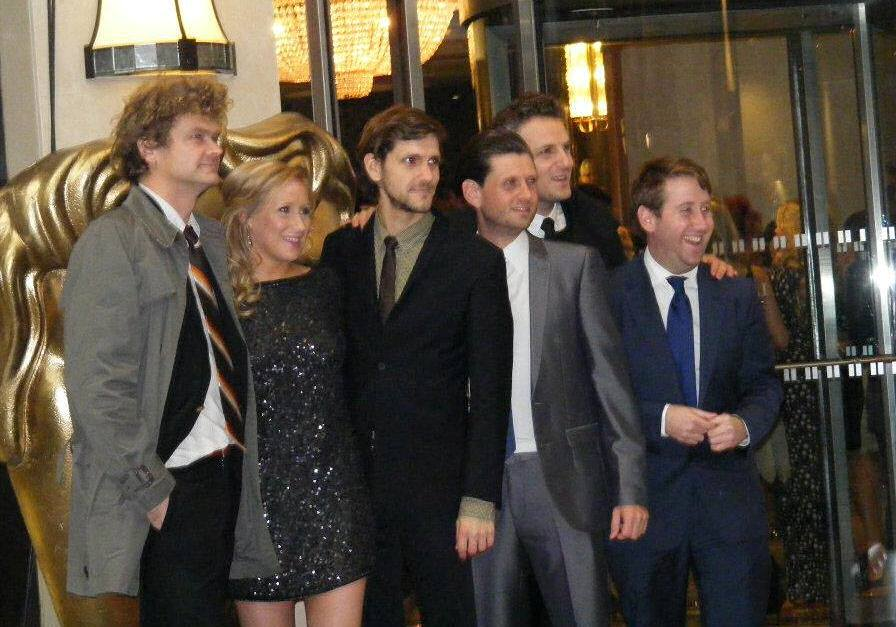
The group at the 2011 Children's BAFTAs

The collective is made up of Mathew Baynton, Simon Farnaby, Martha Howe-Douglas, Jim Howick, Laurence Rickard, and Ben Willbond. All members contribute writing and acting to their productions.

The group initially collaborated for the children's TV show Horrible Histories, but have continued to collaborate since then.

They formed the formal Them There identity for the start of the production of Ghosts, and the collective is credited for the production alongside Monumental Pictures.

== Works ==
=== Horrible Histories (2009–2014) ===
Horrible Histories was a British sketch comedy and musical television series, based on the children's history books of the same name. The show was produced for CBBC by Lion Television with Citrus Television and ran from 2009 to 2014 for five series of thirteen half-hour episodes, with additional one-off seasonal and Olympic specials. The creative team was largely recruited from the UK comedy scene, including the central troupe alongside a large supporting cast headed by Katy Wix, Lawry Lewin, Alice Lowe and Dominique Moore. As well as carrying over the graphic style and much of the content of the Horrible Histories book series, the approach and humour of the show was inspired by past British historical comedies, including Blackadder and the Monty Python films.

Each episode covered multiple eras in history, named for their respective book titles. The show combined live-action sketches, which often parody other UK media or celebrities, with music videos, animations and quizzes. The series was a critical and ratings success, winning numerous domestic and international awards. In 2011 the show was the subject of a Live Prom at the Royal Albert Hall, where sketches and songs from the series were performed live. The cast left the series in 2014, with the series continuing with a new creative team the next year.

=== Yonderland (2013–2016) ===
Following the end of Horrible Histories, the troupe reunited for Yonderland, a sitcom that was broadcast on Sky 1 from November 2013 to December 2016. Howe-Douglas starred as 33-year-old Debbie Maddox, who becomes increasingly bored with her life as a suburban stay-at-home mother until an elf (Baynton) appears from a portal in her cupboard, insisting that she's the "chosen one" destined to save the eponymous fantasy world. Reluctantly, Debbie agrees to meet with the Elders of the realm... only to discover that they've lost the scroll that explains what the chosen one is supposed to do. As it turns out, Yonderland is a silly, magical place, threatened by the evil Negatus (Farnaby). It will take all of Debbie's resources to complete each week's quest in time to pick up her children from school.

=== Bill (2015) ===
The group's first film, Bill, was released on 18 September 2015. Whilst not officially related to the Horrible Histories series, it was produced by the BBC, reunited and starred the original core performers of the series, and shared the comedic approach of its historical content.

=== Ghosts (2019–2023) ===
Ghosts is the troupe's most recent series, which they co-created, write and star in. It is a sitcom which was broadcast on BBC One from 2019 to 2023 over five series. It centres on a group of ghosts from different historical periods haunting a country house they share with its new living occupants (played by Kiell Smith-Bynoe and Charlotte Ritchie).

The six members of the Them There troupe play seven of the nine principal ghost characters (with Laurence Rickard playing both caveman 'Robin' and the head of headless Sir Humphrey Bone), alongside two additional ghosts played by Katy Wix and Lolly Adefope, who, along with Smith-Bynoe, both also appeared alongside the core team on Horrible Histories. They also each play a ghost from the plague pit.

All members of the collective have writing credits for different episodes, with every episode written by one or two of the cast. Baynton wrote the most episodes, having (co-)written 16 of the 34 episodes, mostly with Howick (15 episodes). Rickard has written 14 episodes, Willbond 9, Howe-Douglas 6, and Farnaby 2.

The series was the first post-watershed comedy by the ensemble, although some television critics noted that the series was suitable for adults and children alike, and it was moved to a pre-watershed slot from series 2 onwards. Reviews of the series have been positive, with critics appreciating the high joke rate, the premise and the strength of the acting ensemble. The series was made by the production company Monumental Pictures, part of ITV Studios. It is filmed on location at West Horsley Place in Surrey. The show ran for five series, with four Christmas specials, and one Comic Relief special featuring Kylie Minogue.

The show was remade for an American audience, starring Rose McIver and Utkarsh Ambudkar, and Mathew Baynton from the UK cast has had a guest cameo on the US version.

The group co-authored companion books to the series; Ghosts: The Button House Archives, in 2023 and Ghosts: Brought to Life in 2024.

=== Ghosts: The Possession of Button House (2026) ===
The group announced the film Ghosts: The Possession of Button House through social media (primarily Instagram) on 27 February 2026, with filming in early March 2026. It is based on the original BBC1 television series, and was filmed with Monumental Pictures. It was released by Lionsgate in the UK and Ireland on 23 October 2026.
