= Bill (2015 film) =

- United Kingdom theatrical release poster
- Directed by: Richard Bracewell
- Screenplay by: Laurence Rickard; Ben Willbond
- Story by: Laurence Rickard; Ben Willbond
- Produced by: Richard Bracewell; Tony Bracewell; Alasdair Flind; Charles Steel
- Starring: Mathew Baynton; Simon Farnaby; Martha Howe-Douglas; Jim Howick; Laurence Rickard; Ben Willbond; Helen McCrory; Damian Lewis
- Cinematography: Laurie Rose
- Edited by: Gary Dollner; David Freeman; Billy Sneddon
- Music by: Andrew Hewitt
- Production companies: BBC Films; Punk Cinema; Cowboy Films
- Distributed by: Vertigo Films (UK)
- Release date: 18 September 2015 (United Kingdom)
- Running time: 94 minutes
- Country: United Kingdom
- Language: English
- Budget: $6.4 million
- Box office: $968,534

Bill is a 2015 British family adventure comedy film from the Them There theatrical collective, famed for being behind children's TV series Horrible Histories and Yonderland. It was produced by Punk Cinema, Cowboy Films and BBC Films and was released in the UK on 18 September 2015 by Vertigo Films. The film is a fictional take on the young William Shakespeare's search for fame and fortune, as written by Laurence Rickard and Ben Willbond and directed by Richard Bracewell who co-produced with Tony Bracewell, Alasdair Flind and Charles Steel. It features the six lead performers playing several different roles each including Mathew Baynton, Martha Howe-Douglas, Ben Willbond, Simon Farnaby, Jim Howick and Laurence Rickard. Bill has received mostly positive reviews from critics and grossed $968,534 worldwide. The film also received nominations for the Evening Standard British Film Award for Award for Comedy and the Into Film Award for Family Film of the Year.

== Premise ==
Bill is set during Shakespeare's "lost years"—the crucial period, long a mystery to scholars, covering his rise from obscurity in Stratford-upon-Avon to fame as a playwright in London. According to the official synopsis, the film will tell the "real story" of what happens when "hopeless lute player Bill Shakespeare leaves his family and home to follow his dream. It’s a tale of murderous kings, spies, lost loves, and a plot to blow up Queen Elizabeth I." Writer Rickard further explained that in this "very different" version of his life, the future Bard has already tried "everything from contemporary dance to playing lute in a band. He's never found his calling."

== Cast ==
The six members of the starring troupe were announced as playing 40 total roles, in the manner of the Monty Python films. Their full list of roles is below:

- Mathew Baynton as William Shakespeare, Lord Burghley, English messenger, Customs official
- Martha Howe-Douglas as Anne Hathaway, Molly, Spanish courtier, Body collector
- Ben Willbond as King Philip II of Spain, Earl of Southampton, Grubby Thief, Alexander Dimitrievitch, Head of Guards
- Simon Farnaby as Juan Domingo, Earl of Croydon, Sausage, Dimitri Alexandrovitch, Fur Seller
- Jim Howick as Gabriel Montoya, Christopher Marlowe, Cynical Jester, Palace Doorman, Mysterious Man, Even Grubbier Thief, Party Planner
- Laurence Rickard as Lope Lopez, Sir Francis Walsingham, Stand-up Jester, Chatty Guard, Slightly late courtier, Ian, Hanging Criminal, Chicken Drumstick

It was confirmed at the 2014 Cannes film festival that Homeland star Damian Lewis would be joining the cast as Sir Richard Hawkins. Other supporting actors include:

- Helen McCrory as Queen Elizabeth I
- Rufus Jones as Sir Walter Raleigh
- Justin Edwards as Sir Francis Drake
- David Crow as Ramon
- John Henry Falle as Miguel
- Jamie Demetriou as Sergio
- Richard Atwill as Seve

== Production ==
The starring cast in York Minster. L-R: Laurence Rickard, Simon Farnaby, Mathew Baynton (as "Bill" Shakespeare), Martha Howe-Douglas, Ben Willbond and Jim Howick

BBC Films announced Bill on 13 May 2013, as a co-production with fellow UK production companies Punk Cinema and Cowboy Films. Head of BBC Films Christine Langan said that "we’re thrilled [to be] making the first film starring this team of incredibly talented and popular British comedy writers and performers." In November of the same year ScreenDaily.com reported that the BFI (British Film Institute) Film Fund had invested £1 million in the production, with further undisclosed amounts coming from BBC Films, LipSync and Screen Yorkshire, through its Yorkshire Content Fund.

Principal filming began on 10 February 2014 at locations around Yorkshire, including York Minster, Skipton Castle, Marske-by-the-Sea, Bolton Castle and Selby Abbey. Other filming locations included Stowe School, Caroline Gardens Chapel in Peckham, London, and Weald and Downland Open Air Museum in West Sussex. The closing scenes were filmed at Shakespeare's Globe, a modern recreation of the theatre where many of Shakespeare's plays were first performed.

Former Horrible Histories co-stars Rickard and Willbond are credited with the Bill screenplay, and are also the top-billed performers along with the four other members of the HH starring cast (Baynton, Howe-Douglas, Farnaby and Howick). Despite this connection, and sharing a similar subject matter, the film has no official affiliation with the earlier TV series. It is the second project (after Yonderland) created by the sextet as a means to continue working together as a troupe after Horrible Histories ceased production in 2012, while maintaining the familiar character-and-costume driven comedy style. Making the move to film was "a bit scary," Willbond said, "but we cooked up a really nice plot." Rickard described the overall tone of the new project as "a hundred different brands of idiocy, really... We staunchly defend the idiocy."

In contrast to the conscientious grounding in accuracy that was the trademark of Horrible Histories, Bill is by design a purely imaginary tale. In the initial press release for the film, the co-writers noted that "We're playing with history, just as Shakespeare did, for the entertainment of the audience." Commenting on the choice of subject, Rickard added that in fact "the joy of the "lost years" is we can tell a fun story without trampling on the facts—it gives us licence to take William Shakespeare on a truly ridiculous caper, yet end with him becoming the man the world knows."

The first full-length trailer for the film was released in December 2014, at which point the film's theatrical release date – originally scheduled for late February 2015 – was confirmed to have been delayed until 27 March the same year. This was subsequently revised again – with no official explanation – to 21 August.

Vertigo Films announced on 12 August 2015 that it would be releasing Bill in the UK after previous distributor Koch Media had closed its UK film distribution business. Vertigo Films co-owner Rupert Preston told Screen International that “The film is really good fun and plays well with both adults and kids. It’s clever, bright and great British entertainment.”

== Soundtrack ==
Bill: Original Motion Picture Soundtrack

Soundtrack album by Andrew Hewitt
- Released: 18 September 2015
- Recorded: 2015
- Genre: Soundtrack
- Length: 58:43
- Label: Varèse Sarabande
- Producer: Mark Lo

Andrew Hewitt film scores chronology
The Sea (2013)	Bill: Original Motion Picture Soundtrack (2015)	The Stanford Prison Experiment (2015)

The film's score was composed by Andrew Hewitt. The soundtrack was released on 18 September 2015 by Varèse Sarabande.

Track listing

- 1593 – A Time Of War And Plague
- Sir Richard Hawkins Is Captured
- Bill Shakespeare And His Family
- King Philip II Of Spain – Deuce Or Juice?
- The First Fanfare
- The Court Music Of Queen Elizabeth I
- The Specialists And Walsingham The Spy
- Bill Travels To That London
- More Court Music
- King Phil Sails To England
- King Phil Lands In England
- The Second Fanfare
- Phil's Catholic Lair
- The Earl Of Croydon
- Even More Court Music
- Anne And Bill
- Bill Pursued By Walsingham
- Duelin’ Banjos
- Phil Closes In On Christopher Marlowe
- Marlowe's Death
- Marlowe's Ghost
- A Series Of Funny Misunderstandings – Bernard Hughes and Laurence Rickard
- The Specialists And The Gunpowder Plot
- Prologue To The Play
- The Play Begins
- The Final Sword Fight
- Bill's Final Speech To Anne
- Mortal Coil
- William Shakespeare

== Release ==
Bill was released in the UK on 18 September 2015 by Vertigo Films. It was released on DVD in the UK on 15 February 2016. It was shown on a one-time basis in the United States on 11 April 2016 through Fathom Events.

== Reception ==
The review aggregator website Rotten Tomatoes reported an approval rating of 90%, with an average rating of 6.3/10 based on 21 reviews. Elliott Noble said 'the gags keep coming in a madcap tale that's Bard to the bone.' Alys Keys said 'Those who are unaware of their previous work will find just as much to enjoy in this iconoclastic approach to the bard as the most dedicated fans. No matter what your age or fan-status may be, it is simply a joy to watch.' Mark Kermode said in The Guardian, 'Nicely balancing its historically literate gags with broad knockabout slapstick, Bill is a crowd-pleasing treat that should tickle audiences young and old alike.' The film grossed $968,534 worldwide.

== Accolades ==
Year	Award	Category	Nominee	Result
2016	Evening Standard British Film Awards	Award for Comedy	Richard Bracewell; Laurence Rickard; Ben Willbond	Nominated
2016	Into Film Awards	Family Film of the Year	Bill	Nominated
