= Horrible Histories (2009 TV series) =

British sketch comedy television series

- Title logo (with background used from Series 2–5)
- Genre: Musical; Comedy; Sketch comedy Parody; Educational; Black comedy
- Based on: Horrible Histories by Terry Deary; Peter Hepplewhite; Neil Tonge
- Developed by: Dominic Brigstocke; Caroline Norris
- Written by: Ben Ward; Lucy Clarke; Dave Cohen; Susie Donkin; Steve Punt; George Sawyer; Laurence Rickard; Gerard Foster; Colin Swash; Howard Read; Jack Bernhardt; Jessica Ransom; Gabby Hutchinson Crouch; Danny Peak; Sarah Morgan; Claire Wetton; Ben Partridge
- Directed by: Steve Connelly; Dominic Brigstocke (series 2–4); Chloe Thomas (series 1 and 4)
- Presented by: Rattus Rattus (John Eccleston)
- Starring: Mathew Baynton; Simon Farnaby; Sarah Hadland; Martha Howe-Douglas; Jim Howick; Laurence Rickard; Ben Willbond
- Voices of: Jon Culshaw; Jess Robinson; Dave Lamb
- Theme music composer: Richie Webb; Matt Katz
- Composer: Richie Webb
- Country of origin: United Kingdom
- Original language: English
- No. of series: 5 + specials
- No. of episodes: 65 regular episodes, 5 special episodes, 1 full-length special, 3 shorts (list of episodes)

Production
- Executive producers: Lion Television: Richard Bradley; CBBC: Kim Shillinglaw (series 1); Alison Gregory (series 2–4); Melissa Hardinge (series 4 and 5)
- Producers: Caroline Norris; Giles Pilbrow; Dominic Brigstocke (series 1); Imogen Cooper (series 3–5)
- Cinematography: Peter Edwards
- Running time: 28 minutes
- Production companies: Lion Television; Citrus Television (series 2–4)

Original release
- Network: CBBC
- Release: 16 April 2009 – 4 August 2014

Related
- Horrible Histories (2015 TV series) Horrible Histories: Gory Games Horrible Histories with Stephen Fry

Horrible Histories is a British live-action historical and musical sketch comedy television series, based on the bestselling book series of the same name by Terry Deary. The show was produced for CBBC by Lion Television with Citrus Television and ran from 2009 to 2014 for five series of thirteen half-hour episodes, with additional one-off seasonal and Olympic specials.

The TV show carries over the graphic style and much of the content of the Horrible Histories book series. It maintains the franchise's overall irreverent but accurate focus on the dark, gruesome or scatological aspects of British and other Western world history, spanning predominantly from the Stone Age to the post-World War II era. Individual historical eras or civilisations are defined and named as in the books, with sketches from several different time periods combined within a single episode. Live-action sketches—which often parody other UK media or celebrities—and music videos are intercut with animations and quizzes. The starring troupe are Mathew Baynton, Simon Farnaby, Martha Howe-Douglas, Jim Howick, Laurence Rickard, Ben Willbond and Sarah Hadland, alongside a large supporting cast headed by Katy Wix, Giles Terera, Lawry Lewin, Alice Lowe and Dominique Moore. The black rat puppet "host", Rattus Rattus, appears in short bridging segments, explaining the factual basis for each sketch and helping children understand the facts.

The creative team was largely recruited from the mainstream adult UK comedy scene. They took inspiration from such quintessentially British historical-comedy classics as Blackadder and the Monty Python films. The series was a critical and ratings success, eventually gaining a wide all ages audience through its non-condescending and inclusive approach. It has won numerous domestic and international awards and has been named among the greatest British children's television series of all time.

In 2011, a spin-off game show, Horrible Histories: Gory Games, was launched on CBBC. In the same year, the original show was repackaged for main channel BBC One as Horrible Histories with Stephen Fry, with Fry replacing the puppet, Rattus Rattus, as presenter. A new series of special episodes began airing in 2015, featuring a new format and cast. It continues to be frequently repeated on the CBBC channel daily.

== Background ==
Horrible Histories is based on the British children's historical-comedy book series by Terry Deary, first published by Scholastic UK in 1993 and since expanded into a multimedia franchise. The books and subsequent spin-off materials are intended to pique young children's interest in history via short, factually based but humorously told anecdotes highlighting aspects of the subject not usually covered in more traditional educational sources.

LionTV executive producer Richard Bradley, whose company had previously produced several adult history-themed programmes and whose son was a fan of the Horrible Histories books, was the initial driving force behind a new TV adaptation. Deary was initially skeptical, having had a negative experience with the 2001 animated series, which had only loosely incorporated his concept. He finally agreed to the new project on the condition that it be explicitly "horrible, funny and true". While disclaiming any active role in developing the subsequent series, he would eventually contribute to the writing as well as appearing in several small roles.

The producers were determined that the show be respectful of audience expectations for the Horrible Histories brand, maintaining its familiar visual style and content as far as possible. Early concepts for bringing it to the screen involved framing or interpretive devices, including a ghostly train carrying children into the past, or a wizard storyteller to act as their guide. Eventually Bradley with producer/director Dominic Brigstocke concluded that the material was strong enough to stand on its own, so they developed, in consultation with CBBC executives, a live-action sketch-comedy showcase. Once the writing was underway, the producers further discovered that sticking as closely as possible to the historical truth made it easier for them to find the humour within it. They then introduced a comedy style relying on parodies of familiar modern media conventions as a means of making these historical details more immediately accessible.

To do the material full justice, Brigstocke and series producer Caroline Norris used their industry contacts to put together a creative team consisting mostly of veterans of the adult UK comedy community. The BBC readily agreed to this cross-demographic experiment. They also approved the adoption—insofar as was possible in a programme aimed at young children—of the core franchise precept of "history with the nasty bits left in", which frequently involved "gross-out"-style bodily function humour and comic violence.

The new creative team, while avoiding references aimed specifically at adults, was determined not to adapt the humour to children or otherwise patronise their audience. Instead, they sought to make the best use possible of the material. Norris said that her goal was "to make a show that people would say was too good for children... we started out with really high ambitions." To that end, adult historical satires such as Blackadder and the Monty Python films were shown at the first writers' meeting to demonstrate the proposed tone, and these influences would be visible throughout the show's run. Once the first series had aired and it was realised that the overall approach was working well, the creative team built on and significantly expanded the scope of the comedy elements for the second. This trend continued through each subsequent series. The net result was a show that immediately appealed to young children while also gaining the increasing respect—and viewership—of older audiences.

== Format ==
The divisions by historical era or civilisation in the book series are carried over in the TV show, focusing on events in or directly affecting Great Britain and (to a lesser extent) the larger Western world. The Inca and Aztec empires are also featured in later series. Sketches are grouped under these divisions, named as in the books, beginning with the Savage Stone Age and including among others the Cut-throat Celts, Awful Egyptians, Groovy Greeks, Rotten Romans, Smashing Saxons, Vicious Vikings, Measly Middle Ages, Terrible Tudors, Slimy Stuarts, Gorgeous Georgians, Vile Victorians and Frightful First World War. The timeline for the most part ended at the Woeful Second World War. During the fifth and final series the show featured a handful of significant post-World War II (or "Troublesome Twentieth Century") events, including the civil rights movement and the Space Race between the US and the USSR. The most recent event referenced was the 1969 Apollo 11 Moon landing.

Typical examples of the title cards with animated characters, based on the art style of the books, that introduced sketches

Each named division has its own title card that appears before each sketch (or group of sketches) set in that era or civilisation, along with a short introductory animation featuring a period-appropriate character. Throughout each sketch, small pop-up signs are used to affirm the truth (or otherwise) of any particularly implausible-seeming concepts mentioned onscreen. The live-action material is intercut with short animated sketches, quizzes and interludes with puppet "host" Rattus Rattus (performed by John Eccleston), who addresses the viewer directly as a presenter, commenting on and clarifying the factual basis behind the humour. Rattus also occasionally holds up pop-up signs himself during sketches.

Sketches were filmed en masse and then cut into episodes by the producers based on creative rather than chronological or other educational considerations, in the manner of a more traditional sketch-comedy series. They often fall under a recurring banner—usually with its own short title sequence—but otherwise vary widely in length, visual style and approach. Many are recognisable parodies of other popular media or celebrities, in formats ranging from spoof commercials to mock TV shows, newscasts, magazines, video games and film trailers. Notable parody inspirations included Masterchef, Wife Swap, Come Dine with Me, Gogglebox and The Apprentice. "Horrible Histories Movie Pitch", in which historical figures pitch their life stories to a panel of Hollywood producers played by League of Gentlemen actors Mark Gatiss, Steve Pemberton and Reece Shearsmith, used the format of a former commercial campaign for Orange's cinema reminders to turn mobiles off.

The show also created several popular recurring characters and concepts, notably "Stupid Deaths", in which a skeletal, platinum-blond Grim Reaper amuses himself while processing souls for admittance to the afterlife by forcing candidates from throughout history to relate the embarrassing details of their demise. HHTV News' Bob Hale and his eccentric-but-erudite in-studio reports provide a broader picture on historical events (such as the Wars of the Roses and the French Revolution), in a style reminiscent of presenter Peter Snow. The "Shouty Man", a parody of a typically ebullient infomercial host (like Barry Scott), pitches unusual historical products.

=== Music ===
Original music plays a significant role in the show and its popularity; "Music from Horrible Histories" was chosen as the 2011 theme of the BBC Proms' annual children's concert. Alongside various short intro themes and commercial jingles, each episode (Note: With the exception of Episode 5 of Series 1, produced before the music became a priority as described below.) and each special contains at least one longer comedy song centred around a particular historical figure or theme and performed by the cast in appropriate character.

In the first series, the songs generally had no particular satirical slant, and were often intercut with sketches from the same era. However, after the creative team noted the critical and popular success of the major exception ("Born 2 Rule", which featured King Georges I–IV performing in the style of a boyband) the decision was taken from the second series onwards to continue in that vein. Historical concepts were matched to a diverse range of modern musical references, and the results were showcased as self-contained music video parodies. The thirteenth episode of the second and each subsequent series was retooled as a "Savage Songs" special, featuring a compilation of that series' outstanding videos.

The songs have since become among the most critically and popularly acclaimed elements of the show, especially among its adult audience. Commentators cite the apt cleverness of the various historical/musical parody match-ups, and the complexity and skill with which the musical elements are executed. Principal composer Richie Webb confirms that the songs became more sophisticated as a result of the show's increasing popularity with older viewers, as well as the demands of increased visibility online. Many of the videos have earned standalone popularity on YouTube.

The videos tend to run about three minutes, with two significant exceptions. "The Monarchs' Song", from the third series, lists all of the British monarchs since William the Conqueror, using a Chas & Dave-inspired cumulative format. (Note: Listen to an audio clip (uploaded by the composer) here) The creative team wrote the song to challenge the show's young audience, after noting that the same youngsters had been inspired to memorise lyrics to previous songs. "We're History", styled as a grand finale for the show's final episode, uses stock footage from across the show's run to revisit every major era it ever featured in turn. (Note: See video clip here)

== Content and educational value ==
No formal educational method was applied to the production, and no attempt was made to follow any of the official four National Curriculum’s within the UK for primary school history. The show's creators were acutely aware of educational possibilities, but—in line with Deary's overall mandate for the franchise—saw their basic role as popularising history, inspiring further curiosity about the academic subject rather than attempting to teach it seriously. The show's effectiveness in this respect was endorsed by historical scholars, including presenter Dan Snow. Writing in The Independent, Gerard Gilbert notes that Horrible Histories is part of an extensive British black-comedy tradition not only in adult but also in children's programming. In later series, as usable material from the books began to run out, there was a progression towards more sophisticated, adult sketches in terms of both creativity and educational content, as the show began relying on material that their younger viewers would be less familiar with.

"My aim for this was always that kids would go away and read up more about a subject. They love all the slapstick, but they also love what Terry does really well in the books—telling you something your parents don’t know. When you’re eight years old you get told what to do by everyone, so being able to teach your dad something is amazing."

— Caroline Norris, 2013

Throughout, emphasis was placed on meshing comedy with the demands of historical accuracy, as defined by the mainstream scholarly consensus on the topic. This stance sometimes encompassed traditionally accepted if not actually well-documented anecdotes, such as those involving Caligula. All the material used on the show was vetted by production assistant and self-described "tyrannical pedant" Greg Jenner during both writing and filming; he says that he has counted only eight errors out of more than 4,000 facts presented over the course of the show's run. Costuming and makeup were likewise painstakingly recreated based on primary historical sources where available.

When an error was discovered, the effort was made to correct it whenever possible. This process is perhaps most noticeable in the evolution of a song featuring the four Hanoverian King Georges: lyrics in the original 2009 video incorrectly saying that George I had "died on the loo" were correctly reassigned to George II for the song's reprise at the show's 2011 BBC Prom concert.

Taking cues from what Deary describes as his "seriously subversive" attitude towards the mainstream British history education model meant that the show inevitably incorporated sociopolitical comment. Perhaps most explicitly, Scots-Jamaican nurse Mary Seacole was deliberately championed in both a sketch and later song as a forgotten heroine in the shadow of Florence Nightingale. The activities of African-American activists Harriet Tubman and Rosa Parks were also showcased, as was ex-slave boxer Bill Richmond. According to Norris, a desire to include more women's stories was hampered by the traditionally male-dominated viewpoint of historical records. The show did make an attempt to counteract this by giving showcase songs to the British women's suffrage movement and women's work on the British homefront during World War II, and wherever possible highlighting strong-willed, dynamic female figures, including Queen Victoria, Elizabeth I and Boudicca. Religious controversies, class divisions, the ethics of conquest, and labour conditions were likewise touched on.

The association with a proven and popular children's brand focusing on potentially sensitive subjects enabled the TV series to deflect any serious controversy regarding the same subjects, as they had demonstrably already been presented to children without any ill effects. Senior writer Steve Punt said that there were in fact very few complaints regarding the initial series' content, adding that "everyone was very relieved". The producers did consider some topics intrinsically unsuited for an irreverent comic treatment, as for instance the Holocaust or the harsher details of slavery, and avoided them accordingly. Norris has described her personal criteria for age suitability as whether she would be nervous watching it with a ten-year-old. While BBC executives in large part were willing to concede the requirements of reflecting historical realities, some topics, notably suicide, needed careful handling to avoid potentially negative impact on younger viewers. The show sometimes acknowledged particularly emotive subject matter (the World War I Christmas truce, for example) by following up the sketch not with a joke, but a more sombre elaboration of the less comedic details.

== Production ==
The TV series used the Horrible Histories brand, logo and associated trademarks under licence from publisher Scholastic Books. It was produced for the BBC by LionTV and Citrus Television, (Note: Citrus Television was formed by several of the Horrible Histories producers during the show's first series, and is credited alongside LionTV from the second series onward.) with post-production being handled by Platform Post Production. Under series producer Norris and directors Brigstocke, Steve Connelly and Chloe Thomas, each series of thirteen episodes took approximately one year to produce. The process included several months of research into the historical facts, two to three months of writing, eight weeks of filming both on location and at London's Twickenham Studios, and three to four months of post-production.

At first the sketches were derived almost exclusively from the books, whose multimedia approach, consisting of short anecdotes interspersed with cartoons, diaries, newspaper articles and recipes, proved easily adaptable to the screen either as raw material or creative inspiration. In later series, as usable material from the books and other obvious sources began to run out, concepts were drawn from more standard historical texts under Jenner's supervision. He and fellow researchers read through many different studies and picked out suitably quirky, intriguing snippets, which were then pitched to the writers for development.

Inspiration for the music videos came from many different sources, and input from all members of the show's creative team was encouraged. With the exception of "A Gorgeous Georgian Lady", adapted by Deary from his book Gorgeous Georgians, all songs were original to the series. Once Jenner and Norris had finalised the subject matter and music genre, lyrics were commissioned from the writing team, usually Dave Cohen. These were rewritten as needed under Norris' supervision to ensure as much factual information as possible was included. Webb then composed and recorded each song's instrumental track at Noisegate Studios, hewing as closely as possible to the style of the genre or artist in question. The finished vocal and backing tracks were later returned to Noisegate for post-production by Webb and colleague Matt Katz.

The 2D animated sequences were directed by Tim Searle of Baby Cow Animation, based on Martin Brown's illustrations for the books. They were voiced by Jon Culshaw and Jess Robinson along with various regular cast members. Video game-styled sketches were achieved using a mix of 3D animation and live-action green-screen footage. Properties frequently were modified foodstuffs, with melted chocolate bars standing in for excrement and soup for vomit.

Each series debuted in the UK in April or May from 2009 to 2013, and on international channels including Canada's BBC Kids, the United States' Discovery Kids, Malaysia's NTV7, the Philippines' GMA Network, and Australia's ABC3. Six special episodes, comprising a mix of new and existing material around a single theme, were broadcast in the UK. "Horrible Christmas" (aired in 2010) was followed by a "Sport Special" (July 2012, to coincide with the 2012 London Olympic Games) and a "Scary Special" (autumn 2012, themed around Halloween). "Ridiculous Romance" (themed around Valentine's Day) aired in February 2014; the "Frightful First World War Special" aired later the same year, as part of the BBC's commemoration of the 100th anniversary of the outbreak of World War I.

In autumn 2011, the BBC edited footage from the show's summer Prom concert into an hour-long TV special ("Horrible Histories' Big Prom Party"), featuring specially shot linking sketches. In addition, standalone sketches hosted by Stephen Fry, as well as a special "Bob Hale Report", were produced as part of the 2012 Sport Relief benefit programme. In the same year, several sketches were commissioned as part of the BBC's live television coverage of the Diamond Jubilee of Elizabeth II, to be performed on Tower Bridge, but due to time constraints only one was aired.

The producers decided to cease full-time production after the fifth series, citing concerns around the increasing difficulty in finding suitable historical material. However, the possibility of further specials marking important historical or holiday milestones has been discussed.

=== Cast ===
The cast members were recruited from sketch and character comedy, having previously had roles in Gavin & Stacey, Peep Show, The Thick of It and The Mighty Boosh TV series among others. Several of the writers and researchers also occasionally appeared in front of the camera, including Punt, Jenner, George Sawyer and Susie Donkin, while actors Mathew Baynton and Ben Willbond sometimes contributed to the writing. Laurence Rickard was recruited solely as a writer, but found himself part of both the senior writing staff and starring cast after creating the character of Bob Hale, whose extended, convoluted monologues proved impossible to hand over to anyone else.

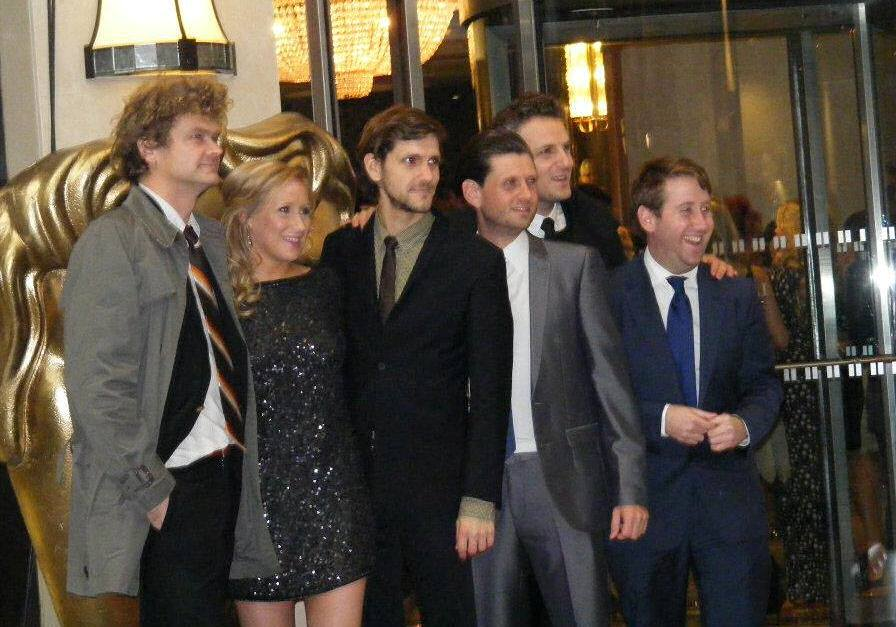
The starring cast at the 2011 Children's BAFTAs. L-R: Simon Farnaby, Martha Howe-Douglas, Mathew Baynton, Laurence Rickard, Ben Willbond and Jim Howick

Individual sketches and songs were cast by the production team, sometimes acting on input from the show's stable of performers themselves. While certain roles naturally lent themselves to a particular actor, Norris said that confidence in the entire cast's ability was such that the producers also experimented with casting against type. The demands of filming thirteen episodes' worth of material in the same timeframe as a standard six-episode sketch show, while coping with the many complex makeup and wardrobe changes required, resulted in casting also being partially dependent on the logistics of moving a performer from one character to another. Recurring characters were if at all possible played by the actor who had originated the part, leading to the development of several signature roles, as for example Baynton's Charles II, Jim Howick's Shouty Man, Rickard's Bob Hale, Willbond's Henry VIII, Martha Howe-Douglas's Elizabeth I, Simon Farnaby's Death and Sarah Hadland's Queen Victoria.

The performers were allowed to improvise provided that they maintained factual accuracy. Howick said that improvisation was actually often necessary due to the rapid-fire pace of filming, which left very little time to prepare for individual roles. On the other hand, both Rickard and Baynton suggest this enforced spontaneity may have ultimately worked to enhance the comedy, not least by preventing the jokes from becoming over-rehearsed.

Six performers (Baynton, Howick, Rickard, Willbond, Howe-Douglas and Farnaby) were credited as main or starring cast throughout the show's run; a seventh, Sarah Hadland, left after the second series but returned with an "also starring" credit for the fourth and fifth. The initial sextet appeared from Series 2 onwards as the standard face of the show at premieres and other press opportunities, and performed as a troupe for such peripheral events as the show's BBC Prom concert. They became a particularly close-knit group both personally and professionally. Eventually this led them to continue working together after Horrible Histories ceased full-time production, creating, writing and starring in the TV series Yonderland, feature film comedy Bill and TV series Ghosts.

Starring Actor	Roles (recurring characters and named historical figures only)
Mathew Baynton	Charles II of England, William Shakespeare, host of "Historical Fashion Fix", Philip II of Spain, Aristotle, historical detective D.I. Bones, Nigel the Historical Paramedic, Emperor Elagabalus, Guy Fawkes, Menelaus, Richard I Lionheart, Mark Antony, Emperor Augustus, Captain Black Bart, Henry I of England, Charles I of England, James VI and I (Series 1 – 4), Nicholas II, George II of Great Britain, Isaac Newton, Peter III of Russia, Francis I of France, Johannes Gutenberg, Orville Wright
Simon Farnaby	Death, Caligula, historical PR agent Cliff Whiteley, William the Conqueror, George III (Series 1 and 5 and BBC Prom concert), Edward I, Robert Dudley Earl of Leicester, Arthur Phillip, Rameses II, Robert Walpole, senior Historical Grimefighter, Edmond Halley, Marcus Crassus, Edward Smith, William Harvey
Martha Howe-Douglas	Elizabeth I, Queen Victoria (Series 2 to 5), HHTV News anchorwoman Sam, Cleopatra, Empress Matilda, Joan of Arc, spoof of Karren Brady in "Historical Apprentice", Boudicca, Sally the "Historical Dating Service" consultant, Suzanne the Historical Hairdressers Owner, Mary Shelley, Mary, Queen of Scots (Series 4)
Jim Howick	George IV, the Shouty Man, Richard III of England, spoof of Alan Sugar in "Historical Apprentice", Nero, Winston Churchill, Prince Albert, spoof of Gregg Wallace in "Historical Masterchef", Geoff the Historical Paramedic, HHTV News investigative reporter Dominic Duckworth, Lord Nelson, Napoleon, Henry II of England, Blackbeard, Isambard Kingdom Brunel, Samuel Pepys, Wilhelm II, Martin Luther
Laurence Rickard	HHTV News special correspondent Bob Hale, James VI and I (Series 5), George V, Draco, Diogenes, William II of England, Arthur Wellesley, 1st Duke of Wellington, Stephen, King of England, Nicholas Culpeper, Henry V of England, Beau Brummell, Erik the Red, Pompey, Paul Revere, Wilbur Wright
Ben Willbond	Henry VIII, Alexander the Great, HHTV News field correspondent Mike Peabody, Julius Caesar, spoof of John Torode in "Historical Masterchef", George I of Great Britain, spoof of John Humphrys in "Historical Mastermind", Pierre de Coubertin, Sir William Cecil, Louis XVI, William Wallace, Lord Byron, Henry Ford, Edward III, Commodus, Robert III of Scotland, Charles VII of France, Giovanni Borgia
Sarah Hadland	Queen Victoria (Series 1), Mary I (Series 4), Nell Gwyn, Anne Hyde, Katharina von Bora, Florence Nightingale, presenter of "Ready Steady Feast" (Series 1), emergency ward nurse in "Historical Hospital" (Series 1), Mandy the dental assistant in "Historical Dentist", Nefertari, narrator of "Dodgy War Inventions", Claire Clairmont, Grace Darling

The supporting cast varied considerably by series. Those performers with additional speaking parts are listed below:

Actor	Appearances	Roles (recurring only)
Lawry Lewin	Series 2 to 5	Oliver Cromwell, spoof of Brian Cox in "Wonders of the Historical Universe", Charles Edward Stuart, George III (Series 2), spoof of Nick Hewer in "Historical Apprentice", Dave the junior Historical Grimefighter, "Who on Earth Are You?" in-house genealogist Sir Francis Guesswork
Dominique Moore	Series 2 to 5	Mary Seacole, presenter of "Ready Steady Feast" (Series 2), HHTV presenter Fearne Polyester (spoof of Fearne Cotton), Rosa Parks, emergency ward nurse in "Historical Hospital" (Series 2 onward), Karen the "Historical Dating Service" consultant
Alice Lowe	Series 2, 3 and 5	Henrietta Maria of France, Marie Antoinette, Matilda of Boulogne, Lady Jane Grey, Joan of Arc, Sue, Cliff Whiteley's secretary, HHTV News field reporter Jessica Harvey-Smythe
Giles Terera	Series 1 to 5	Presenter of "HHTV Sport", Jesse Owens
Javone Prince	Series 1	Host of "This is Your Reign"
Lisa Devlin	Series 1	Shelley the assistant at "Historical Hairdressers"
Rhashan Stone	Series 3	Richard ("HHTV Sport" Reporter)
Susie Donkin	Uncredited in Series 2 and 3, credited for Series 1, 4 and 5	Various characters, including Kitty Fisher
Terry Deary	Uncredited in Series 1 to 3, credited for Series 5	Titus, Baldwin IV the Bearded
Katy Wix	Series 1 to 4	Various characters
Steve Punt	Series 1, 2 and 5	Various characters
Katherine Jakeways	Series 4 and 5	Various characters, such as Caroline of Ansbach
George Sawyer	Series 1	Various characters; Pausanius (Series 1)
Nathaniel Martello-White	Series 2	Various characters
Daniel Taylor	Series 2	Various characters
Jessica Ransom	Series 4 and 5	Various characters; Philippa of Hainault, Eleanor of Aquitaine
Jalaal Hartley	Series 4	Various characters
Greg Jenner	Series 3 to 5	Various characters
Joshua Grant	Series 5	Various characters
Bertie Gilbert	Series 1 to 3	Various characters
Matthew Fenton	Series 1 to 5	Edward VI, Lambert Simnel
Georgia Wake	Series 1 and 2	Various characters

Puppeteer John Eccleston, operates the puppet rat host, Rattus Rattus, whilst also supplying his voice. Scott Brooker performs additional puppetry. Jon Culshaw, Jess Robinson, and Dave Lamb provide various additional voice-overs and narration throughout the series.

The show has attracted several special guest stars. In the fourth series, Gatiss, Shearsmith and Pemberton of The League of Gentlemen joined the show, playing the panel of Hollywood producers for the "Movie Pitch" sketches. Shearsmith said, "Mark and I independently thought it was just a brilliant show that works on a number of levels ... There's not a weak link in the team here and it's an honour to be asked to be part of it". Other featured guests included:

- Meera Syal (Series 1, Storyteller in "Twisted Fairytales")
- Alexei Sayle (Series 2, Arabic healer, "Historical Hospital")
- Tanni Grey-Thompson (Series 3, herself, field reporter for "HHTV Sport")
- David Baddiel (Series 2 & 3, storyteller Vincenzo Larfoff, "Scary Stories")
- Mark Gatiss, Reece Shearsmith and Steve Pemberton as the judges of "HH Movie Pitch"
- Chris Addison (Series 4, two different "Historical Apprentice" candidates)
- Amir Khan and Jermain Defoe (Series 4, as themselves in Sport Relief sketches)
- Al Murray (Series 5, various roles, notably the drummer for the Smiths-inspired Charles Dickens music video)

== Reception ==
Horrible Histories was immediately, and almost universally, greeted with critical enthusiasm. On its debut, Alice-Azania Jarvis of The Independent described the show as "fun, filthy and genuinely engaging, in a peer-to-peer way." Harry Venning in The Stage approved the "seriously funny, beautifully performed and endlessly inventive sketches" along with "plenty of crowd-pleasing fart and poo gags." By the second series, the show's cross-generational appeal was beginning to attract significant attention from adult media. Naomi West of The Daily Telegraph characterised the first series as "boundary-pushing", suggesting that "the bold decision to approach the series in the same way as an adult show has been the key to its success ... [it] delivers more laughs than most post-watershed comedies." James Delingpole in The Spectator likewise recommended the show to viewers of all ages, saying that "Even though there are vast quantities of entirely gratuitous fart, bottom and wee wee jokes, the cumulative effect—bizarrely—is one of dumbing up rather than down." Discussing the first two series in The Guardian, television writer Jesse Armstrong said that "Hit shows are very difficult to achieve. You need to have everything just right—that's what's so terrifying. But Horrible Histories has a great cast and brilliant writers. They're also blessed with great source material. The tone is perfect and it is done in a non-patronising, engaging way".

Clare Heal of the Daily Express, in her review of the third series, praised the show's "spot-on spoofs of modern telly" and agreed that "There's no particular target audience but pretty much anyone of any age will find something in there for them". Kerrie Mills of PopMatters rated the first three series 9/10, opining that the show "does also provide evidence, edgewise between the falling bodily fluids, of a sharp comic intelligence ... in fact, it might just be one of the most successful original comedy shows to appear in years." Stephen Kelly of The Guardian argued that the fourth series had definitively transcended its roots to become not just "the best show on children's television—it's one of the smartest comedies on TV", performed by an "astonishing cast ... so superb that even special guest stars such as Chris Addison can look slightly out of their depth." In an article discussing the League of Gentlemen troupe's appearance in the same series, the Radio Times' Gareth McLean agreed that "despite nominally being a children's programme, Horrible Histories is one of the best sketch comedies on TV", adding that "ultimately, comedy performers relish [the] madcap, sometimes deliciously silly exuberance, which, thanks to the show's razorsharp writing, educates as well as entertains." Graeme Virtue of The Scotsman called the League's reunion a "coup" for the series: "While Gatiss's American accent was pretty duff, the bickering spark between the three Gentlemen remained."

Sarah Dempster of The Guardian said that "Four years into its ingenious 'making history look less crap' operation ... HH remains true to its aim, with meticulously harvested historical data + roaringly well-observed pop culture pastiches = seemingly infinite heritage lolz." Writing in The Independent, Grace Dent commended the cast in particular, saying that the show "has the distinct feel of a group of bright, young, erudite, writery-actory sparks having a tremendously good time." Venning of The Stage reiterated his praise of the show, adding that "it also has the courage to tackle potentially controversial events head on", specifically citing the song featuring the Civil Rights Movement activist Rosa Parks as retelling her story in a "clever, concise and accessible way without trivialising it." In 2016, Margaret Lyons of The New York Times praised the series as "deeply silly", "frequently hilarious", and, "very consistent".

=== Historical accuracy ===
Most criticism of the show revolves around the accuracy and presentation of its factual content. The TV series, like the books, has been used by educators as a classroom aid and was endorsed by UK Education Secretary Michael Gove as useful for spotlighting "neglected periods of history." However, writing after the final episode, Simon Hoggart in The Spectator noted that "There has been some whipped-up controversy about Horrible Histories", adding that "where the books make a rudimentary attempt to teach history as a series of interconnected events, the television show is basically gags, chiefly about defecation, gluttony, murder and torture. It's quite amusing, though whether it will pique an interest in the subject, or—as some say—merely encourage children to learn more about defecation, gluttony, murder and torture, we cannot know."

More specifically, in September 2014, responding to a complaint from the Nightingale Society, the BBC Trust determined that the show had breached editorial guidelines in the sketch highlighting the controversy surrounding Mary Seacole's role in nursing history. In this sketch, Florence Nightingale says that she rejected the Jamaican-born Seacole's application to Nightingale's Crimean nursing corps because it was open to "British girls" only. This was held to be imputing racially discriminatory motives to Nightingale—and thus implying them to be historical fact—without sufficient proof. In response, the BBC pulled the sketch from their website and announced it would be removed from future showings of the episode.

In a 20th-anniversary retrospective of the franchise in The Telegraph, David Horspool, the history editor of the Times Literary Supplement, defended the show's overall viewpoint, saying, "There's no particular reason why grown-up historians shouldn't like Horrible Histories too ... They simplify, and they have a definite point of view, but all historians are guilty of that to some degree." He further said that "Getting children interested in the past isn't necessarily easy, and Horrible Histories does it extremely effectively—and those who come to history because it's fun seem far more likely to stay with it in the long run." Writing for entertainment website DorkAdore, Anna Lowman added that "Terry Deary had the fine idea of getting kids into history by giving the facts a human face and a joke or two ... The producers of the CBBC show have perfectly transferred Deary's ethos to television."

The recut for BBC1 with Fry as host drew particular criticism as to whether its educational methods were suited to an adult demographic. History Today editor Paul Lay called the idea "frightening". Historian and Labour Party MP Tristram Hunt, while admitting that he had not yet actually seen the programme, voiced his concerns that the show's content was not "challenging and stimulating" enough for the BBC, adding that "For children, Horrible Histories is an exciting aid to engage with the guts and gore of the past, but there are more sophisticated, populist ways of getting people involved in history than this. I'm in favour of populism, but there has to be a bit of depth to it."

Other critics have taken a more lenient view. Historian and television presenter Dan Snow described the show's modus operandi as "one step above Blackadder, but that's fine ... it plays to stereotypes, but it's fantastic as entry-level history." Writing in The Independent, Tom Sutcliffe noted that "As a grown-up you might quibble with the fact that they don't always distinguish between things that genuinely are true and the things that people would like to be (sadly, there's no hard evidence that Aeschylus was brained by a tortoise dropped by an overflying eagle)", but added that "children and adults alike should enjoy the gleefully anachronistic way in which the information is presented." Dent in The Guardian, while conceding what she called the show's "frankly slapdash, dumbed-down approach to history", also argued that "in Horrible Histories there are always serious messages lurking amid the silliness."

=== Ratings ===
In its debut week of 15 June 2009, the show topped the UK children's TV viewing figures with 191,000 viewers. The first series reached a viewing peak of 50% of UK children aged 6–12, while the second was watched by 34% of UK children aged 6–12, or 1.6 million total. Throughout its run, the show routinely ranked at or near the top of the CBBC ratings, reaching a peak of 548,000 viewers for Episode 10 of Series 5.

== Awards and nominations ==
Awards and nominations for Horrible Histories include several BAFTA Children's Awards, two British Comedy Awards and a Rose d'Or Award for Best Children's Programme. It is the first children's programme to win a British Comedy Award and four successive children's BAFTAs for Best Comedy. In 2013 the show was also named in a Radio Times poll of all-time greatest British children's TV series, and was ranked at No. 8 in a similar Top 50 list presented later the same year by Channel Five.

Awards and nominations for Horrible Histories
Year	Award	Title	Recipient	Result
2009	BAFTA Children's Award	Best Factual Programme	Caroline Norris, Chloe Thomas, Steve Connelly	Nominated
2009	BAFTA Children's Award	Best Writing	The Writing Team	Nominated
2009	Royal Television Society Award	Best Children's Programme	Horrible Histories	Nominated
2010	AIB Award	Best Children's Factual Programme or Series	Horrible Histories	Won
2010	BAFTA Children's Award	Best Comedy	Horrible Histories	Won
2010	BAFTA Children's Award	Best Performer	Jim Howick	Won
2010	BAFTA Children's Award	Best Writer	The Writing Team	Won
2010	BAFTA Children's Award	Kids' Vote – Television	Horrible Histories	Nominated
2010	British Comedy Award	Best Sketch Show	Horrible Histories	Won
2010	Prix Jeunesse International Award	Best 7–11 Non fiction	Horrible Histories	Won
2010	Royal Television Society Award	Best Children's Programme	Horrible Histories	Won
2011	BAFTA Children's Award	Best Comedy	Horrible Histories	Won
2011	BAFTA Children's Award	Best Performer	Martha Howe-Douglas	Nominated
2011	BAFTA Children's Award	Best Writing	The Writing Team	Nominated
2011	BAFTA Children's Award	Kids Vote – Television	Horrible Histories	Nominated
2011	British Comedy Award	Best Sketch Show	Horrible Histories	Won
2011	Broadcast Award	Best Children's Programme	Horrible Histories	Nominated
2011	Kidscreen Award	Best Acting	Cast of Horrible Histories	Won
2011	Kidscreen Award	Best Kids Non Animation or Mixed Series	Horrible Histories	Won
2011	Kidscreen Award	Best Writing	The Writing Team	Won
2011	Royal Television Society Award	Best Children's Programme	Horrible Histories	Nominated
2012	BAFTA Children's Award	Best Comedy	Horrible Histories	Won
2012	BAFTA Children's Award	Best Performer	Mathew Baynton	Nominated
2012	BAFTA Children's Award	Best Writer	The Writing Team	Nominated
2012	British Comedy Award	Best Sketch Show	Horrible Histories	Nominated
2012	Broadcast Award	Best Children's Programme	Horrible Histories	Nominated
2012	Kidscreen Award	Best Acting	Cast of Horrible Histories	Won
2012	Kidscreen Award	Best Writing	The Writing Team	Won
2012	Rose d'Or Award	Best Children's Programme	Horrible Histories	Won
2012	Royal Television Society Craft & Design Award	Costume Design Entertainment & Non Drama Productions	Horrible Histories	Nominated
2012	Royal Television Society Craft & Design Award	Effects Picture Enhancement	Horrible Histories	Nominated
2012	Royal Television Society Craft & Design Award	Production Design Entertainment & Non Drama Productions	Horrible Histories	Nominated
2012	Writers' Guild Award	Best Children's TV Script	The Writing Team	Nominated
2013	BAFTA Children's Award	Best Comedy	Horrible Histories	Won
2013	British Comedy Award	Best Sketch Show	Horrible Histories	Nominated
2013	Royal Television Society Craft & Design Award	Best Picture Enhancement	Horrible Histories	Nominated
2013	Royal Television Society Craft & Design Award	Best Tape and Film Editing: Entertainment and Situation Comedy	Horrible Histories	Won
2014	Kidscreen Award	Best Acting	Cast of Horrible Histories	Won
2014	Kidscreen Award	Best Kids Non Animation or Mixed Series	Horrible Histories	Won
2014	Kidscreen Award	Best Writing	The Writing Team	Won

== DVD and online releases ==
All five series of the original show, plus the "Scary (Halloween) Special", "Ridiculous Romance" & the "Frightful First World War Special" and "Horrible Christmas" have been released on Region 2 DVD by 2entertain for the BBC, both individually and as boxed sets. "Horrible Histories' Big Prom Party" & the "Sport Special" have yet to receive a home video release.

Each series, as well as the "Scary Special" and "Sport Special", are also available for download from the UK iTunes store. As of February 2014, all episodes from Series 1–3 were available for download to American audiences on Amazon.com "Instant Video" service.

== Spin-offs ==
In 2011, a spinoff game show, Horrible Histories: Gory Games, was launched on CBBC. Likewise coproduced by Lion TV and Citrus, the show was co-hosted by Dave Lamb with puppet Rattus Rattus and includes cameos from many of the parent show's cast. As of 2013, the show had aired three full series. For summer 2011, the show was repackaged for adult Sunday-night audiences as Horrible Histories with Stephen Fry, a six-part "best of" compilation for BBC One. The show featured a selection of sketches and songs from the first two series chosen by the producers of the parent show, with Fry replacing the puppet rat as presenter.

== 2015 revival and specials ==
In 2015, the BBC announced that the Horrible Histories concept would be revived in a new format, focusing on the life and times of a single historical figure per episode. The rebooted series was again developed by LionTV and involved a largely all-new production team and cast, while still retaining Jenner as lead historical consultant and many of the original series's writers. New cast members included Naz Osmanoglu, Tom Stourton and Jessica Ransom. Original stars Farnaby and Howick returned in limited roles.

== Films ==
Bill, a BBC comedy film based loosely around the early life of William Shakespeare, was released on 18 September 2015. Though not officially related to the series, the film reunited and starred the original core performers of Horrible Histories in starring roles. The film was met with positive reviews from critics although was a disappointment at the box office.

Altitude Film Entertainment and Citrus Films produced a film adaptation directed by Dominic Brigstocke set in Roman Britain, titled Horrible Histories: The Movie – Rotten Romans. It was released 26 July 2019. The original cast of the TV series were not involved, although members of the revival cast were. The film received mostly positive reviews, earning a 69% approval score on Rotten Tomatoes.

== See also ==
- The Complete and Utter History of Britain
- Histeria!
- History Bites
- The Who Was? Show
