= Yonderland =

British Sky sitcom (2013–16)

- Genre: Sitcom
- Created by: Mathew Baynton; Simon Farnaby; Martha Howe-Douglas; Jim Howick; Laurence Rickard; Ben Willbond
- Written by: Mathew Baynton; Martha Howe-Douglas; Simon Farnaby; Jim Howick; Laurence Rickard; Ben Willbond; Toby Davies; Jason Hazeley; Joel Morris
- Directed by: Steve Connelly; David Sant
- Starring: Martha Howe-Douglas; Mathew Baynton; Jim Howick; Simon Farnaby; Laurence Rickard; Ben Willbond
- Composer: Philip Pope
- Country of origin: United Kingdom
- Original language: English
- No. of series: 3
- No. of episodes: 25

Production
- Executive producers: Tim Bevan; Eric Fellner; Juliette Howell; Lucy Lumsden; Saskia Schuster
- Producer: Sioned Wiliam
- Editor: Mike Holliday
- Running time: 30 minutes
- Production company: Working Title Television

Original release
- Network: Sky One
- Release: 10 November 2013 – 24 December 2016

Yonderland is a British sitcom television series that was broadcast on Sky One from November 2013 to December 2016. It was produced by Sioned Wiliam, and was created by, written by and starred the main performers from CBBC's series Horrible Histories.

== Plot ==
33-year-old Debbie Maddox from Birmingham becomes increasingly bored with her life as a stay-at-home mother, until Elf appears from a portal in her kitchen cupboard, insisting that she is the "chosen one" destined to save Yonderland - which she can reach through the portal in her cupboard. Reluctantly, Debbie agrees, and meets with the Elders of the realm, only to discover that they have lost the scroll that explains what the chosen one is supposed to do. As it turns out, Yonderland is a silly, magical place, threatened by the evil Negatus. It will take all of Debbie's resources to complete each week's quest in time to pick up her children from school - and to find out the secrets of the realm to save Yonderland.

== Cast ==
Most of the cast play multiple roles, both physical performances and voices of puppet characters. The list below is by no means conclusive, but nevertheless lists many of the characters the cast portray. The main cast are as follows:

- Martha Howe-Douglas as:
  - Debbie Maddox, the main protagonist of the series.
  - the voice of Rita, the smartest of the three demons that work for Negatus.
  - Imperatrix, the main antagonist of Series 1 and 2.
- Mathew Baynton as:
  - Elf, Debbie's sidekick.
  - Chief Elder Choop, the leader of the Elders.
  - Anous, an antagonist who works for Imperatrix.
  - Boo, a clown parodying Pennywise, who steals cakes.
  - Robot, a secondary character in the series 2 finale.
- Jim Howick as:
  - Lord Elder Pressley, an elder with a striking resemblance to the iconic American musician Elvis Presley.
  - The voice of Neil, the leader of the three henchdemons.
  - Crone, who is also a titular character in the episode Game of Crones.
  - Trevor, an elder and a blob.
- Simon Farnaby as:
  - Negatus, the main antagonist of the show.
  - Vice-Elder Flowers, an elder with a penchant for disrobing.
- Laurence Rickard as:
  - Scribe Elder Ho-Tan, the only elder who is shown to be literate.
  - the voice of Geoff, the most incredibly idiotic of the three henchdemons.
  - Wizard Bradley, a wizard from the beginning of Series 1.
- Ben Willbond as:
  - Nick the Stick, a stick.
  - Wise Elder Vex, an elder who mispronounces Debbie's name as "Deh-beh".
  - Igor, a minor villain in series 2.
- Dan Renton Skinner as Peter Maddox, the husband of Debbie Maddox.
- Clare Thomson as various supporting characters.
- Stephen Fry as Cuddly Dick, former elder, and Debbie's main adversary in Series 3.

== Production ==
On 22 March 2013, Sky1's Lucy Lumsden announced Yonderland, saying: "We are delighted to give the incredibly talented Horrible Histories cast the opportunity to write and star in a brand new show for the whole family on Sky1." The show was co-produced by Working Title Films. Principal filming under former HH director Steve Connelly began the following May.

The show initially grew out of the desire of its creators (Baynton, Farnaby, Howe-Douglas, Howick, Rickard and Willbond) to continue working together after Horrible Histories ceased production in 2012. The new standalone troupe wanted to maintain the sketch-based, character-driven comedy style from their previous series. They quickly settled on the fantasy quest genre, with its emphasis on individual short vignettes within the larger plot, as the logical next step.

At the same time, Baynton and Willbond had been developing a film idea about an ordinary person dragged into a parallel universe – specifically, a nostalgic fantasy adventure using puppetry rather than more modern animation techniques, in the vein of Labyrinth and The NeverEnding Story." This concept in turn naturally lent itself to the casting of sole female troupe member Howe-Douglas as the central heroine, with her five male costars in multiple roles as the different characters she meets in each episode. In terms of writing together for the first time as a troupe, Howick noted to The Guardian that "[By now] we're such a tight unit, we know exactly what the humour is, and what the tone is." Baynton agreed: "It just grew very nicely out of what happens when the six of us are together in a room."

In keeping with the nostalgic, "lo-fi" tone – and in the interest of creating a more richly populated, inventive and potentially surprising world – Yonderland features numerous Muppet-style puppet characters designed and built by longtime Jim Henson associates Baker Coogan, Lifecast and Fiona Cazaly. The final series, which also featured an extra long Christmas episode had a plethora of new puppet characters designed and built by a team headed by Fiona Cazaly, including puppet makers at Darryl Worbey Studio, Chris Barlow, Andy Heath, Iestin Evans, Natalie Ellnor and puppet costumes by David Brown. Explaining the decision to keep computer animation to a minimum (save for the portal to Yonderland itself), Rickard said: "Because you can make everything photo-realistic these days, it kind of takes the joy out of it. Even if it's brilliant CGI, you still know it's CGI ... you know it's not there, it's not tangible, and it's the same with comedy."

The first series was considered a critical and popular success, earning solid ratings for its timeslot. On 30 June 2014, Sky announced that the show had been recommissioned for a second series, which was filmed in autumn of the same year and began airing in July 2015.

In January 2016 it was announced that Stephen Fry would be joining the cast of Yonderland, for the third series, as "Cuddly Dick", described in the Radio Times as "a mysterious returning elder". Series 3 began broadcasting in October 2016 on Sky1.

In February 2017 it was announced that the third series would be the last and the show had been cancelled.

== Episodes ==
=== Series 1 (2013) ===
No. overall	No. in series	Title	Directed by	Written by	Original release date	UK viewers (millions)
1	1	"The Chosen Mum"	Steve Connelly	Laurence Rickard and Ben Willbond	10 November 2013	1.00
The more Debbie sees of Yonderland, the less she's impressed--until an unexpectedly-fulfilled prophecy convinces her there might just be something to this Chosen One business.
2	2	"Wizard Bradley"	Steve Connelly	Simon Farnaby	10 November 2013	0.76
In order to locate a copy of the missing scroll, Debbie must seek the help of a once legendary, now has-been wizard who's quite literally lost his Mojo.
3	3	"Reformation"	Steve Connelly	Jim Howick and Laurence Rickard	17 November 2013	0.84
By the time Debbie stumbles across the monks of Old John, their devotion to speaking nothing but the absolute truth has already infuriated Negatus to the point of destroying their monastery. Now, in order to save their lives, the Chosen One must teach them to lie.
4	4	"The Ultimate Prize"	Steve Connelly	Laurence Rickard and Ben Willbond	24 November 2013	0.65
When the incumbent champion of the Yonderland Grand Tournament is killed, Negatus sees an opportunity to send in a ringer and disrupt the proceedings--unless Debbie can convince her own candidate, the incumbent's humble page, to believe in himself.
5	5	"Closing the Portal"	Steve Connelly	Toby Davies	1 December 2013	0.46
Debbie has had it with the havoc being Yonderland's Chosen One is wreaking on her family life and decides to resign. Before he can close the portal permanently, though, Elf must take her on one last quest...
6	6	"The Idiot King"	Steve Connelly	Mathew Baynton	8 December 2013	0.50
Negatus' celebration of the Chosen One's departure is interrupted when he learns that she's not only decided to stay around, but has joined forces with arrogant King Bernard to locate a precious artifact. Soon Debbie and the King find themselves not only treasure-hunting but trying to stay alive.
7	7	"The Heart of the Sun"	Steve Connelly	Laurence Rickard and Ben Willbond	15 December 2013	0.48
On her latest quest to save the inhabitants of Yonderland from themselves, Debbie encounters the Ninnies, a race whose slavish adherence to tradition has actually caused them to begin devolving.
8	8	"Dirty Ernie"	Steve Connelly	Simon Farnaby	22 December 2013	Under 0.40
Ordered by his very impatient boss to lure Debbie into a trap, Negatus adopts a harmless disguise and solicits her help on a rescue mission that brings together several of the characters from previous episodes.

=== Series 2 (2015) ===
No. overall	No. in series	Title	Directed by	Written by	Original release date	UK viewers (millions)
9	1	"Panic in the Streets of Yonderland"	Steve Connelly	Simon Farnaby	13 July 2015	0.49
Imperatrix's presence brings rioting to the streets on Yonderland and sends the Elders into lockdown.
10	2	"The Winging Detective"	Steve Connelly	Mathew Baynton and Jim Howick	13 July 2015	0.36
A murder at the Meadowlands Festival calls for the (not-so-genius) mind of Yonderland's finest (or, rather, only) detective.
11	3	"A Vicious Circle"	Steve Connelly	Laurence Rickard and Ben Willbond	20 July 2015	0.44
Ellis of Woolworth mistakenly believes that Debbie is to blame for his brother's fate.
12	4	"Up The Workers"	Steve Connelly	Laurence Rickard	27 July 2015	0.38
Debbie discovers a sweatshop run by newly-educated Ninnies. Plus, a message from Yonderland reveals alarming information about Debbie's past.
13	5	"Nanny La Roo"	Steve Connelly	Martha Howe-Douglas and Laurence Rickard	3 August 2015	0.29
When she refuses to be banished from Yonderland, Debbie is reunited with her eccentric childhood nanny after she and Elf pay a visit to her former home.
14	6	"Game of Crones"	Steve Connelly	Jim Howick, Laurence Rickard and Ben Willbond	10 August 2015	Under 0.29
Debbie heads into the Imperatrix-controlled Darklands to rescue a top scientist who has been hoodwinked into making a weapon of mass destruction.
15	7	"The Last Fahl"	Steve Connelly	Toby Davies & Laurence Rickard	17 August 2015	Under 0.30
Debbie is called to Yonderland when the Elders hear news that a vicious monster is placing the last survivor of a noble species at risk.
16	8	"Careful What You Wish For"	Steve Connelly	Mathew Baynton and Laurence Rickard	24 August 2015	Under 0.29
The discovery of a wish granting tree causes chaos in Yonderland. At the same time, Imperatrix launches her deadly secret weapon.

=== Series 3 (2016) ===
No. overall	No. in series	Title	Directed by	Written by	Original release date	UK viewers (millions)
17	1	"A Rising Tide"	David Sant	Martha Howe-Douglas and Laurence Rickard	16 October 2016	0.30
Yonderland starts to return to as close to normal as it can manage, and an elder called Cuddly Dick (Stephen Fry) returns from his travels after being imprisoned by Imperatrix. Debbie and Elf have to free a man from a flood, only to find he is less of a man than they expected. Meanwhile, Negatus and the overlords meet to welcome their new leader and start hatching new plans.
18	2	"Elders 11"	David Sant	Laurence Rickard	23 October 2016	0.31
Debbie and the elders launch a daring raid to rescue a friend. Meanwhile, Negatus struggles to impress his brand new boss, Cuddly Dick, who has the population of Yonderland against the elders.
19	3	"The Bird & The Bee"	David Sant	Ben Willbond	30 October 2016	Under 0.33
In a parody of Batman, Yonderland has a new hero, here to save the day... unfortunately. Negatus Reunites with some old friends, but gets himself into hot water when he tries to rebel against Cuddly Dick.
20	4	"Boo"	David Sant	Mathew Baynton	6 November 2016	0.28
Debbie tackles a militarised cake competition, meanwhile Negatus makes a mark in prison. The Elders meet Boo (Mathew Baynton), a circus clown, who freaks the Elders out. Meanwhile, Peter Maddox (Dan Renton Skinner) is hosting a birthday party for the twins, but struggles with the entertainment. Negatus has to fight Tiny in prison.
21	5	"The Negatus Redemption"	David Sant	Simon Farnaby	13 November 2016	0.33
Debbie works with Negatus to break him out of prison so they can team up to overthrow Cuddly Dick. Meanwhile the elders learn survival and relaxation techniques from a mysterious stranger. Peter and his father Nigel (Anthony Head) have been trying to get fit
22	6	"Swapsies"	Steve Connelly	Mathew Baynton and Jim Howick	20 November 2016	N/A
The elders send Negatus on a secret mission to infiltrate Cuddly Dick's inner circle. Meanwhile, Debbie and Elf get to experience how the other half lives...
23	7	"Miss Smashing"	Steve Connelly	Jason Hazeley and Joel Morris	27 November 2016	N/A
Debbie and Elf investigate a suspicious Yonderland game show. Meanwhile Negatus and the demons work to uncover the truth about Cuddly Dick's secrets
24	8	"The Time Being"	Steve Connelly	Laurence Rickard	4 December 2016	N/A
Elf must step up to save the day, but time is running out. Or it already has. Or maybe there's plenty of time. Meanwhile Pete finally sorts out the house sale.
25	9	"It's the Thought that Counts"	Steve Connelly	Simon Farnaby and Laurence Rickard	24 December 2016	N/A
The people on both sides of the portal celebrate the holiday season. Debbie learns about the Yonderland holiday of "Thanktival" and the elders and their children sing to save the realm. Negatus hatches a plan to steal everyone's presents

== Reception ==
Yonderland met with generally positive reviews, most focusing on its uniquely all-ages nature and nostalgic references to fantasy classics. Writing in the Guardian, Sarah Hughes called the series "perfect family viewing", summing it up as "both supremely silly and very clever indeed – the sort of frothy concoction that looks effortless but is actually very hard to get right... the writing is a wonderful mix of knowing and daft", all of which earned it 16th place in the same paper's ranking of the Top 30 TV shows of 2013. Den of Geek's Rob Smedley called the show "joyously amusing... the clichés are magnificently well handled or hidden by some top gags and a cast who know just how to deliver them."

The Radio Times named the show #28 in its own Top 40 year-end list, saying further of the show's writer/creators that "Characters tended to appear once when they could each have had their own series; this gang have so many ideas and such skill in executing them that, in the long term, Python comparisons might not be out of place." Total Film magazine placed it at #25 in their Top 25 year-end list, agreeing that "It's basically Labyrinth meets Monty Python. Yes, it's THAT good. Though it's essentially aimed at the kiddies, like all the best muppet-y stories, there are jokes for the adults, too." Entertainment website Cultbox UK named it their Best Comedy of the same year, "simply by virtue of being a genuinely funny comedy that the whole family can watch together... There's something for everyone in the Horrible Histories team's madcap fantasy-ribbing recipe of puppets, inventive characters, more puppets, and cheeky humour."

== DVD release ==
The first series of Yonderland was released on Region Two DVD on 17 February 2014, by Universal Pictures UK. The second series was released on 14 December 2015. The third series was released on DVD on 5 December 2016. And the final episode, the Christmas special, was released on 20 November 2017.
