= George Sawyer (comedian) =

British comedian

George Sawyer is a British comedian. He is one half of the comedy duo "Larry & George" along with Laurence Rickard. He has written for The Armstrong and Miller Show, The Ministry of Curious Stuff, Me and My Monsters, Horrible Histories, Ed and Oucho's Excellent Inventions, Dick and Dom's Funny Business, Gigglebiz and Comedy Lab. He has also appeared in The Ministry of Curious Stuff, Horrible Histories, Dick and Dom’s Funny Business, School of Silence, Comedy Lab and Relic: Guardians of the Museum.
