= Horrible Histories with Stephen Fry =

British television series

Horrible Histories with Stephen Fry is the name given to the six-part re-version of the hit children's sketch comedy Horrible Histories for an adult audience. Broadcast in a Sunday-night time slot from 19 June 2011 to 31 July 2011 on BBC One, the programme features a compilation of sketches from the first two series of Horrible Histories, as chosen by that show's producers. As a concession to the more mature audience, comedian and QI presenter Stephen Fry replaced puppet Rattus Rattus as host, presenting "added insight and historical nuggets".

Producer Caroline Norris, who also served as Horrible Histories' series producer, described the recut as an experiment in "what we would do if [Horrible Histories] was in primetime". From a production standpoint, all that was needed was to choose the sketches that seemed most suitable for an adult audience and then to write appropriate linking material for Fry.

== Episodes ==
No.	Title	Original release date
1	"Episode 1"	19 June 2011
Sketches featured: Terrible Tudors: Queen Elizabeth is notably picky about her portrait. Shakespeare chooses Words What I Made Up as his category on "Historical Mastermind" (both from S02E01). Measly Middle Ages: The "Historical Paramedics" treat an accident victim in their own inimitable fashion (S02E03) . Stupid Deaths: Humphrey de Bohun (S02E04). Slimy Stuarts: HHTV News: Bob Hale's English Civil War Report (S02E07). "Charles II: King of Bling" (music video, S02E02); Vile Victorians: All the inventions have an unusual power source in common on "Victorian Dragons' Den" (S02E07). Shouty Man: New! Victorian Child (S01E09); Groovy Greeks: The story of Helen of Troy retold as a chav romance epic (S01E07). Vicious Vikings: Attempting to navigate by following a hungry raven hits an obvious-in-hindsight snag. "Literally (The Viking Song)" (both from S02E01).
2	"Episode 2"	26 June 2011
Sketches featured: Woeful Second World War: Agent Sophie shows off the latest British spy gadgets to a French Resistance contact (S02E12). The commandant of a German POW camp tries to keep a determined British officer from escaping (S01E02). Slimy Stuarts: The story of the Gunpowder Plot as action movie "Fawkes' 13" (movie trailer). Charles I's unusual punishments for government critics (both from S02E01). Vicious Vikings: Words We Get From the: Vikings (two parts, S01E09 and S01E11). The attack on Lindisfarne monastery is interrupted when the warriors can't quite remember why they're attacking (S02E08). Vile Victorians: "Victorian Inventions" (music video, S02E07); Measly Middle Ages: The News at 1066 provides updates from the Norman Conquest via Bayeux Tapestry. (S02E10); Gorgeous Georgians: "Historical Wife Swap": Lord and Lady Posh from the Manor swap with the Peasant family of Poorville (S01E06). Parents tour a boarding school during a violent pupil rebellion (S02E02). Rotten Romans: Dodgy War Inventions No. 79: Roman legions try using stilts to cross marshy Celtic strongholds (animated, S02E07). "Boudicca" (music video, S02E10)
3	"Episode 3"	3 July 2011
More offbeat highlights include Prince Regent George IV's unexpectedly good reaction to some bad news--not so much to the news that his corset's no longer working (S02E05). An evacuee child from the city thinks he's landed in a den of monsters in "The Farm" (horror movie trailer parody, S02E09). Peasant Joan of Arc is confused when an angel announces she's destined for great things (S02E07). "Spartan High School Musical" (music video, S02E03).
4	"Episode 4"	10 July 2011
Meet teenage Emperor Elagabalus and his prankish take on fine dining on "Roman Come Dine with Me" (S02E01); a military briefing devolves into an attempt to outline the causes of the First World War as simply as possible — that is, not very (S01E08); and the Miserables, a Puritan family, join the Cavalier Merrys for a special post-Restoration episode of "Historical Wife Swap" (S01E03).
5	"Episode 5"	24 July 2011
The Durham branch of the British Home Guard manages to do more damage to themselves than to the enemy (S02E01); legendary naval hero Admiral Horatio Nelson turns out to be less than physically impressive (S02E04); and the women of World War II sing about their triumphs on the homefront (S02E05).
6	"Episode 6"	31 July 2011
"Crimewatch BC" attempts to help locate Caesar's assassins (S02E08); WWII codebreakers are a little too clever for their own good (S02E12); and mad King George III's royal physicians torture him in the name of treatment (S02E06).

== Critical reception and controversy ==
From a creative standpoint the project was generally warmly received, especially given the original series' cross-demographic profile had recently been heightened by its first British Comedy Award win for Best Sketch Comedy.

However, the choice of a children's series for an adult-oriented channel drew some criticism as to whether the same educational methods were suited to an older demographic. History Today editor Paul Lay called the idea "frightening". Historian and Labour Party MP Tristram Hunt, while admitting that he had not yet actually seen the programme, voiced his concerns that the show's content was not "challenging and stimulating" enough for the BBC, adding that "For children, Horrible Histories is an exciting aid to engage with the guts and gore of the past, but there are more sophisticated, populist ways of getting people involved in history than this. I'm in favour of populism, but there has to be a bit of depth to it."
