= Laurence Rickard =

British actor, writer and comedian

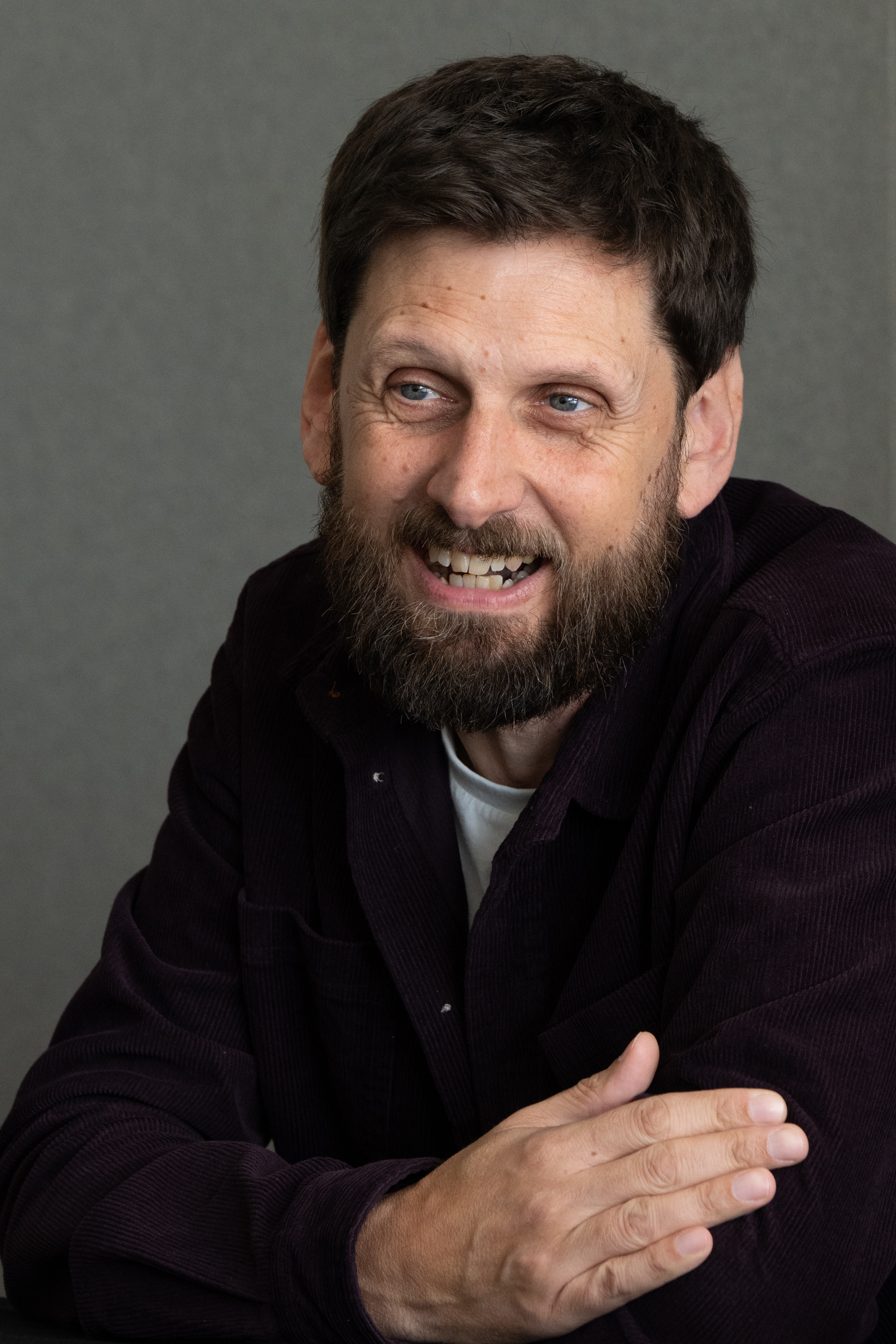
- At MCM Comic Com London, 24 October 2025
- Born: Laurence Rickard; Brighton, East Sussex, England
- Other name: Larry Rickard
- Education: Brunel University London
- Occupations: Actor, writer, comedian
- Years active: 2004–present
- Notable credit(s): Horrible Histories, Bill, Yonderland, Tracey Ullman's Show, Ghosts, We Are Not Alone
- Website: laurencerickard.com

Laurence Rickard is an English actor, writer, and comedian best known as a member of the Them There collective, with whom he both wrote and starred in productions including Horrible Histories, Yonderland, Ghosts, and Ghosts: The Possession of Button House. In 2022, along with fellow Them There member Ben Willbond, he co-wrote the feature length television comedy We Are Not Alone.

He is also one half of the comedy writing/performance duo "Larry and George" with George Sawyer.

== Career ==
Rickard has written for UK comedy shows including The Armstrong and Miller Show, The Charlotte Church Show and The Impressions Show with Culshaw and Stephenson, as well as children's programme Me and My Monsters.

He is a principal cast member, lyricist and writer for the award-winning CBBC programme Horrible Histories, in particular creating and performing the character of 'Special Correspondent' Bob Hale (a parody of presenter Peter Snow). He has also appeared regularly on the spin-off game show Horrible Histories: Gory Games and in the Horrible Histories BBC Proms at the Royal Albert Hall.

Along with the five other members of the Horrible Histories starring cast, Rickard is also the co-creator, writer, and star of Yonderland, a family/fantasy/comedy series that premiered on Sky One on 10 November 2013. Two further series were produced.

In addition he is the co-writer of Bill, a BBC-produced comedy film which is based loosely around the early life of William Shakespeare and involves the same starring troupe. Filming took place in 2014, and the film had a nationwide UK release in September 2015.

As a performer, Rickard has also appeared in the Channel Four Comedy Lab Private Lives as well as the TV series Balls of Steel. He is also a writer and performer on Tracey Ullman's Show and Tracey Breaks the News. Rickard co-created, wrote, and starred in the BBC sitcom Ghosts (2019-2023) and is co-writer of the BBC sitcom Amandaland (2025-2026).

In 2024, Rickard was awarded an honorary doctorate in humanities from Brunel University London for his services to television and education.

== Filmography ==
=== Film ===
Year	Title	Role	Notes
2015	Bill	Sir Francis Walsingham	
2015	Bill	Lope Lopez	
2022	We Are Not Alone	Cirsh	
2025	Chicken Town	Greebo Mechanic	
2026	Ghosts: The Possession of Button House	Robin	Co-writer
2026	Ghosts: The Possession of Button House	Sir Humphrey Bone	Co-writer

=== Television ===
Year	Title	Role	Notes
2009–2013	Horrible Histories	Bob Hale	
2009–2013	Horrible Histories	Various	
2011	Dick and Dom's Funny Business	The Estate Agent	Episode: "The Estate Agent"
2011	Horrible Histories with Stephen Fry	Various	
2013	Anna & Katy	Various	2 episodes
2013–2016	Yonderland	Ho-Tan	24 episodes
2013–2016	Yonderland	Jeff	24 episodes
2013–2016	Yonderland	Wizard Bradley	4 episodes
2013–2016	Yonderland	Various	
2016–2018	Tracey Ullman's Show	Various	14 episodes
2017–2018	Tracey Breaks the News	Various	7 episodes
2019–2023	Ghosts	Robin	35 episodes
2019–2023	Ghosts	Sir Humphrey Bone	35 episodes
2026	Amandaland	Mr Hastings	Series 2

== Awards ==
Year	Project	Award	Event	Notes
2010	Horrible Histories	Best TV Sketch Show	British Comedy Awards	
2010	Horrible Histories	Best Writing	BAFTA (Children's)	
2010	Horrible Histories	Best Comedy	BAFTA (Children's)	
2010	Horrible Histories	Best Children's Show (non-fiction)	Prix Jeunesse	
2011	Horrible Histories	Best Acting	Kidscreen Awards	Entire cast
2011	Horrible Histories	Best British Comedy	British Comedy Guide Awards	
2011	Horrible Histories	Best TV Sketch Show	British Comedy Guide Awards	
2011	Horrible Histories	Best TV Sketch Show	British Comedy Awards	
2011	Horrible Histories	Best Children's Programme	Broadcast Awards	
2011	Horrible Histories	Best Comedy	BAFTA (Children's)	
2011	Horrible Histories	Best Children's Programme	RTS Awards	
2012	Horrible Histories	Best Comedy	BAFTA (Children's)	
2012	Horrible Histories	Best TV Sketch Show	British Comedy Guide Awards	
2012	Horrible Histories	Best Children's Programme	Rose d'Or	
2012	Horrible Histories	Best Acting	Kidscreen Awards	Entire cast
2013	Horrible Histories	Best Comedy	BAFTA (Children's)	
2013	Horrible Histories	Best TV Sketch Show	British Comedy Guide Awards	
2014	Horrible Histories	Special Prize: Best Children's TV of the last 50 Years (Non-Fiction)	Prix Jeunesse International	
2026	Amandaland	Best Scripted Comedy	BAFTA	
