= Martha Howe-Douglas =

English actress and writer (born 1980)

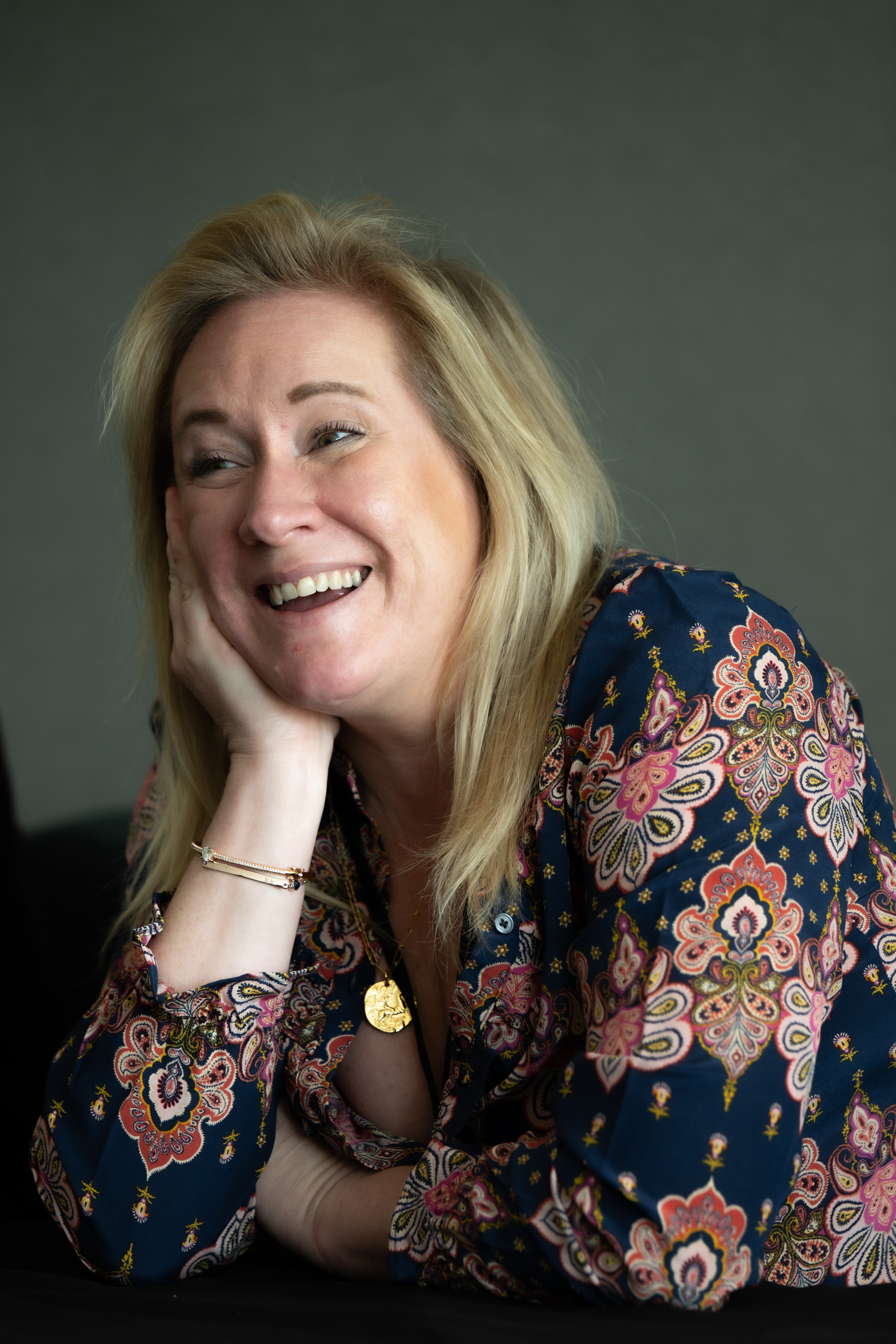
- At MCM Comic Con London, 24 October 2025
- Born: 1981 or 1982 (age 44–45); Moseley, Birmingham, England
- Occupation: Actress
- Years active: 1997–present
- Television: Doctors; Horrible Histories; Ghosts

Martha Howe-Douglas (born 1981 or 1982) is an English actress and writer. She is known as a member of the Them There collective with which she wrote and starred in productions including Horrible Histories, Yonderland, and Ghosts. She also played receptionist Donna Parmar in the BBC One daytime soap Doctors.

== Early life ==
Howe-Douglas was born and raised in Moseley, a suburb of south Birmingham, England, in 1981 or 1982. She attended Edgbaston High School. She graduated from RADA in 2003.

== Career ==
After graduating from RADA, Howe-Douglas appeared in the Christmas special of The Office, as a receptionist at Wernham-Hogg. From 24 April 2006 until 11 May 2007, Howe-Douglas played receptionist Donna Parmar in the BBC daytime soap opera Doctors. For her role as Donna, Howe-Douglas received nominations for Best Comedy Performance and Best Newcomer at the 2007 British Soap Awards.

In 2009, she landed one of the main multi-role parts on a new children's TV history sketch show programme, CBBC's Horrible Histories, where over five years and five series, she played numerous characters including the queens Cleopatra, Elizabeth I, Boudicea and Victoria. In 2011, she appeared in The Proms, in a special live "Horrible Histories Big Prom Party" performance. In 2013, she co-created, co-wrote and co-starred in Sky1's series Yonderland, in which she played lead character Debbie Maddox in all three series.

Howe-Douglas' other acting roles have included appearing in The Armstrong & Miller Show on BBC One and playing Flora Dies-Early in the radio comedy show Bleak Expectations, as well as Lady Anne Woodstock in the radio show The Castle. In 2018, she appeared in the BBC soap opera EastEnders as Annie Pritchard. From 15 April 2019, Howe-Douglas co-wrote, produced and starred in the BBC sitcom Ghosts, which sees her reunited with the Horrible Histories cast.

== Personal life ==
Howe-Douglas is married to a photographer who worked on Ghosts.

== Filmography ==
Year	Title	Role	Notes
1997	Armstrong and Miller	Various	1 episode
2003	The Office	Mel the receptionist	The Office Christmas specials
2005	All About George	Helen	
2005	Doctors	Ms Larson	2 episodes
2006–2007	Doctors	Donna Parmar	Regular role
2007	Freezing	Leon's P.A.	
2009	The Armstrong and Miller Show	Various	
2009	Nativity!	Oakmoor Parent	
2009–2013	Horrible Histories	Various	46 episodes
2011	The Proms	Various	Prom 20: Horrible Histories Big Prom Party
2012	Shakespeare's Wart	Pavlina	Short
2013–2014	WPC 56	Abigail Fenton	5 episodes
2013–2015	Crackanory	Various	4 episodes
2013–2016	Yonderland	Debbie Maddox	25 episodes; also creator
2014	Psychobitches	Pocahontas	1 episode
2015	Bill	Various	
2015	Doctor Foster	Becky	6 episodes
2016–2017	Noddy, Toyland Detective	Pat Pat (voice)	Recurring role
2017	Tracey Breaks the News	Various	1 episode
2018	EastEnders	Annie Pritchard	3 episodes
2019–2023	Ghosts	Lady Fanny Button/Plague Ghost	Main role; also creator and writer
2020	Breeders	Amber	1 episode
2021	Motherland	Ashley	1 episode
2022	Friday Night Live	Rebekah Vardy	1 episode
2026	Ghosts: The Possession of Button House	Lady Fanny Button	Main role; also creator and writer

== Awards and nominations ==
Year	Ceremony	Category	Nominated work	Result	Ref.
2006	RTS Midlands Awards	Best New Talent	Doctors	Won	
2007	British Soap Awards	Best Comedy Performance	Doctors	Nominated	
2007	British Soap Awards	Best Newcomer	Doctors	Nominated	
