= Ben Willbond =

English actor and screenwriter

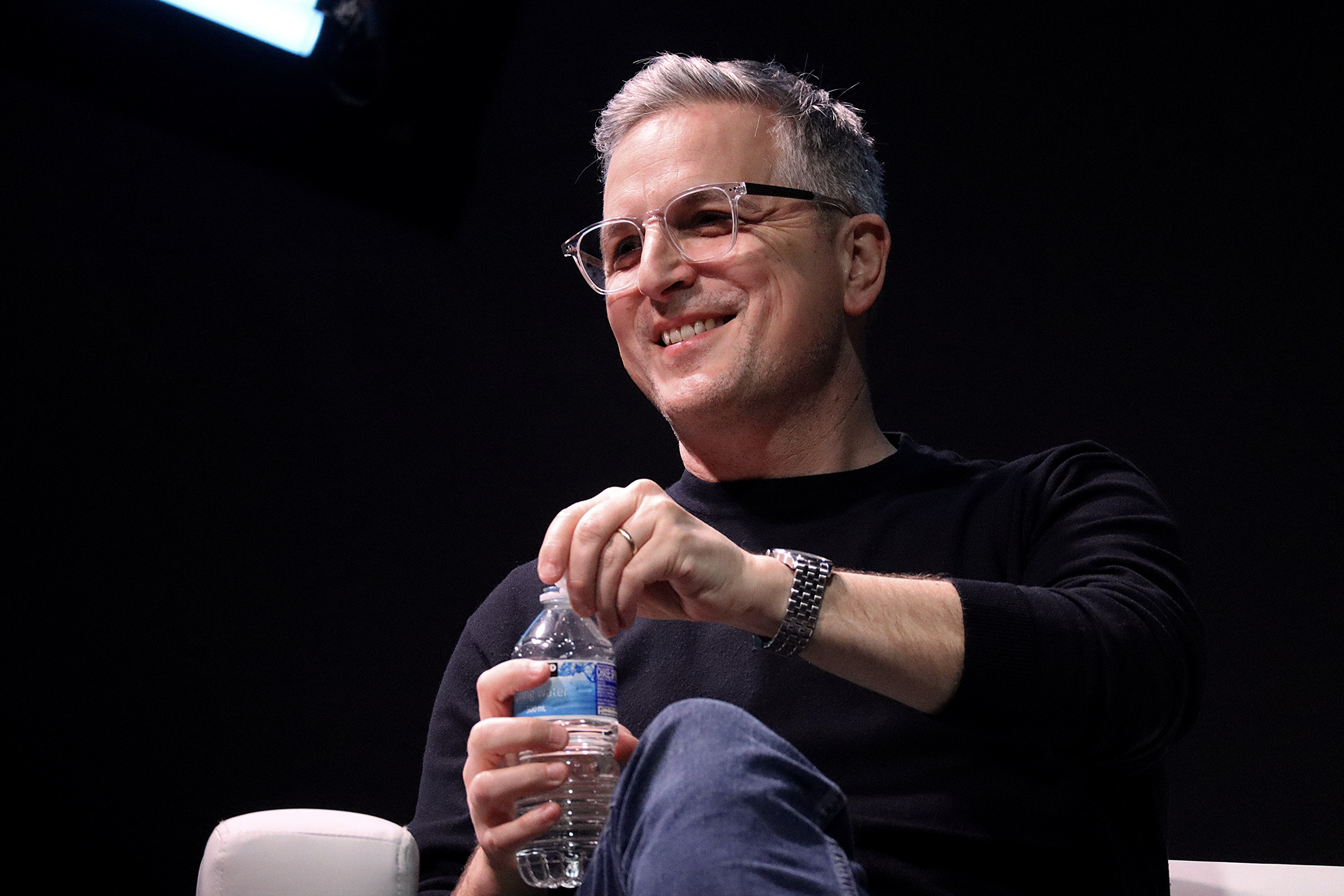
- Willbond at MCM 2024
- Born: Biggleswade, Bedfordshire, England
- Education: St Catherine's College, Oxford
- Notable work: Horrible Histories, The Thick of It, Rev., Ghosts, We Are Not Alone
- Spouse: Charlotte Gordon
- Children: 2

Comedy career
- Years active: 1995–present
- Medium: Television, radio, film
- Genre: Satire
- Website: benwillbond.com

Ben Willbond is an English actor and screenwriter best known as a member of the British Them There collective, for which he has written and starred in productions including Horrible Histories, Yonderland, and Ghosts.

Along with fellow Them There member Laurence Rickard, he co-wrote the 2015 feature film Bill and 2022 feature-length television comedy We Are Not Alone.

== Early life ==
Willbond was a Forces child and consequently his family moved around every two years. He was sent to board at Stamford School in Lincolnshire, when he was nine years old. He was bullied whilst attending the school. Willbond, when talking about his experience at the school, said "I don't actually remember that time because it was so shocking". He studied Russian and French at St Catherine's College, Oxford.

== Career ==
Along with Arnold Widdowson, Willbond was part of the comedy duo "Ben & Arn", who won the Perrier Award for "Best Newcomer" in 1999, and formed the self-proclaimed "thinking man's French pop duo" Priorité à Gauche. He then went on to perform his solo character shows at several Edinburgh Fringe Festivals, the last being in 2005 which also starred Katy Brand and Jim Field Smith.

He is perhaps best known for his regular role in CBBC's Horrible Histories, in which he played a wide variety of historical figures, most memorably recurring roles as Henry VIII and Alexander the Great. Along with the five other members of the Horrible Histories starring cast, Willbond is also the co-creator, -writer and -star of Yonderland, a family fantasy comedy series that premiered on Sky One on 10 November 2013. In addition he is the co-writer of Bill, a BBC-produced comedy film based loosely around the early life of William Shakespeare, which involved the same starring troupe.

Previously, Willbond had starred in a short-lived sketch show for ITV2 called Laura, Ben & Him with Marek Larwood and sometime writing partner Laura Solon. He also appeared in Solon's BBC Radio 4 sketch show, Laura Solon: Talking and Not Talking. Other notable television work includes the recurring roles of Steve Warwick in the BBC comedy Rev, Adam Kenyon in BBC Four's The Thick of It and as a television director in the movie-length final episode of the Ricky Gervais comedy Extras (BBC Two). He has also appeared in Katy Brand's Big Ass Show for ITV2 and Mayo for BBC One.

Willbond's other radio credits include BBC Radio 4 series Deep Trouble, Double Science (co-written with Justin Edwards), Recorded for Training Purposes and the first series of Electric Ink. He also starred in the YouTube romantic comedy Nigel and Victoria.

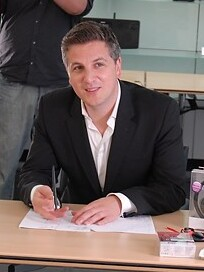
Willbond in 2011

His 2010 short film Tooty's Wedding, which he co-wrote with Solon, won numerous international comedy awards and was screened as part of the 2012 Sundance Film Festival. Other notable film work includes the movie Starter for 10 (2006). In 2007 he had a short appearance in St Trinian's, as a nervous school inspector.

Between 2019 and 2023, Willbond portrayed The Captain in the BBC sitcom Ghosts with the other main Horrible Histories cast.

== Personal life ==
Willbond has two children and is married to Charlotte Gordon. He is a keen cricketer and plays for the Thunderers.

== Awards ==
Year	Project	Award	Event	Notes
2011	Tooty's Wedding	Best Comedy Short	Rhode Island International Film Festival	
2011	Tooty's Wedding	Best Foreign Short & Best Direction (Short)	LA Comedy Festival	
2011	Tooty's Wedding	Jury Prize Best Short Film	Friars Club Comedy Film Festival	
2011	Tooty's Wedding	Best Comedy	Aesthetica Short Film Festival	
2011	Tooty's Wedding	Award of Merit	Accolade Competition	
2011	Horrible Histories	Best Acting	Kidscreen Awards	Entire cast
2012	Horrible Histories	Best Acting	Kidscreen Awards	Entire cast

== Filmography ==
Year	Project	Role	Notes and references
1999	Ben & Arn's Big Top	Ben	Edinburgh Fringe Festival performance
1999	The Now Show		BBC Radio 4
2001	Le Hip Parade	François	Play UK television series
2004–07	Deep Trouble	Writer / performer ('Lieutenant Jack Trainor')	BBC Radio 4
2005	Mayo	Simon Johnston	BBC One
2005	The Gigolos	Ben	Film
2005	Imagine Me & You	David	Film
2005	The Catherine Tate Show	Gym Trainer	BBC Two
2006	Starter for 10	Julian	Film
2006	My Hero	Dexter	BBC One
2006–08	Recorded for Training Purposes	Writer / performer	BBC Radio 4
2007	St Trinian's	Alistair	Film
2007, 2008	Double Science	Doctor Colin Jackson	BBC Radio 4
2007, 2012	The Thick of It	Adam Kenyon	BBC Two
2008	Exit Strategy	Husband	Short film
2008	Lead Balloon	Jamie	BBC Two
2008	Laura, Ben & Him	Writer, performer, co-creator	ITV 2
2009–13	Horrible Histories	Principal sketch performer	CBBC
2010	Cabin Pressure	Mr Alyakhin	BBC Radio 4
2010–11	Rev.	Stephen Warwick	BBC Two
2011	Tooty's Wedding	Peter	Film short
2013–16	Yonderland	Various	
2014	Inside No. 9	Jeremy	Episode: "Sardines"
2015	Bill	Various	Film
2015	Acoustic Kitty	Agent Cooper	Film short
2015	Shush!	Simon	BBC Radio 4
2016	Power Monkeys	Oleg	Channel 4. Utilises Russian degree.
2016	Bridget Jones's Baby	Giles	Film
2017	Playing House	Dr. Clive Ericson	5 episodes
2017	Quacks	Patrice Dupont	1 episode
2017	Danger Mouse	Ham Hands	2 episodes
2017	Tracey Breaks the News	Emmanuel Macron, Various	BBC One
2018	Damned	Marcus Bowles	
2018–2023	There She Goes	Chris	Main role; 2 series and 2023 special
2019	Good Omens	Nigel Tomkins	1 episode
2019	Sequins	Alan Bigsby	Film short
2019–2023	Ghosts	The Captain	Main role; BBC One
2021	Alma's Not Normal	Phil	Series 1, episode 3
2022	We Are Not Alone	Darrenth	Film
2023	A Kind of Spark	Adam Quinn	Main role
2024	The Wives	Frankie Morgan	6 episodes
2024	The Cleaner	Justin	Series 3, episode 1
2026	Death in Paradise	Craig Pinnock	Series 15, episode 3
2026	Ghosts: The Possession of Button House	The Captain	Main role; BBC Film
