= Sandys-Clarke =

Sandys-Clarke is a surname. Notable people with the surname include:

- Peter Sandys-Clarke, English actor
- Willward Alexander Sandys-Clarke (1919–1943), British Army officer
