= Scott Ellis Watson =

Scottish actor

- Born: September 2010
- Occupation: Actor
- Years active: 2025-present
- Known for: I Swear

Scott Ellis Watson (born September 2010) is a Scottish actor. His film credits include I Swear (2025). For that role he was nominated for both breakthrough performance and supporting performance at the British Independent Film Awards.

== Career ==
From Bishopbriggs, Watson appeared in his film debut as the young John Davidson in 2025 film I Swear (2025), portraying him from the age of 12 years-old as he becomes symptomatic of Tourette's syndrome in his teenage years. Watson filmed his scenes in Glasgow in September 2024. In preparation for the portrayal, Watson went on a fishing trip with Davidson and Robert Aramayo, who portrayed the older Davidson in the film. He received wide praise for his performance, which was described as "terrific" by The Observer, "affecting" in Variety and "impressive" by Digital Spy. For that role he was nominated in both the Breakthrough Performance and Supporting Performance categories at the British Independent Film Awards 2025, nominated for Best Actor - Film at the BAFTA Scotland Awards, and was nominated for Young British/Irish Performer of the Year at the London Film Critics' Circle Awards. His performance also received a commendation in the Scottish Parliament.

In 2026, he was named as a Screen Daily Rising Star, and was cast as Jack Marsh in British supernatural comedy film Ghosts: The Possession of Button House; a feature-length version of the BBC comedy series Ghosts, which was released in the United Kingdom in October 2026.

== Filmography ==
Key
†	Denotes works that have not yet been released

Year	Title	Role	Notes
2025	I Swear	Young John Davidson	
2026	Ghosts: The Possession of Button House	Jack Marsh	
