= I Swear (film) =

2025 British film by Kirk Jones

- Theatrical release poster
- Directed by: Kirk Jones
- Written by: Kirk Jones
- Produced by: Georgia Bayliff; Kirk Jones; Piers Tempest
- Starring: Robert Aramayo; Maxine Peake; Shirley Henderson; Scott Ellis Watson; Peter Mullan
- Cinematography: James Blann
- Edited by: Sam Sneade
- Music by: Stephen Rennicks
- Production companies: Tempo Productions; One Story High
- Distributed by: StudioCanal
- Release dates: 7 September 2025 (TIFF); 10 October 2025 (United Kingdom)
- Running time: 120 minutes
- Country: United Kingdom
- Language: English
- Budget: ~£5 million
- Box office: $16 million

I Swear is a 2025 British biographical drama film directed, written, and produced by Kirk Jones. It is based on the true life story of John Davidson, a Scottish man with severe Tourette syndrome who, as a teenager, was the subject of the 1989 television documentary John's Not Mad. The film stars Robert Aramayo as Davidson, alongside Maxine Peake, Shirley Henderson, and Peter Mullan in supporting roles. Scott Ellis Watson makes his acting debut as a young Davidson.

I Swear premiered at the 2025 Toronto International Film Festival on 7 September 2025, and was released in the United Kingdom by StudioCanal on 10 October 2025. It was acclaimed by critics, who praised the performances of Aramayo and Mullan. The film received five nominations at the 79th British Academy Film Awards, winning two, including Best Actor in a Leading Role for Aramayo.

== Plot ==
In 1983, 12-year-old John Davidson lives with his working class family in Galashiels in the Scottish Borders. Aspiring to become a footballer, he begins Secondary School at Galashiels Academy. The next morning, just before a football scout is to come to assess his goalkeeping skills, John begins to inexplicably experience episodes of tics and uncontrollable swearing at school. The head teacher punishes John by whipping his hand with a belt, resulting in a poor performance in front of the scout due to his hand still hurting.

After John's condition keeps causing incidents, the head teacher tells him to find a new school. After spitting at his family during dinner, John is banned from the dining table by his mother Heather and made to eat in front of the fireplace. His condition strains his parents' marriage, until his father abandons the home. Distraught, John attempts suicide by walking into a river, but is rescued and wakes in hospital.

In 1996, John, now 25, is still living with Heather and has been diagnosed with the incurable Tourette syndrome. John runs into his school friend, Murray, who has returned from Australia after his mother, Dottie, was diagnosed with terminal liver cancer and given six months to live. John turns down Murray's invitation to join the family for dinner, but Dottie, a mental health nurse, insists he come in and senses John's discomfort.

Dottie asks about his medication, and the family agrees John should stay with them, much to Heather's despair. Dottie gets John a job interview at the local community centre. The ageing caretaker, Tommy, shows John around and does not react to his tics until John unwittingly smacks Tommy's dog. John assumes that he has ruined his chances of getting the job.

However, Murray's family surprises John at home; not only did he get the caretaker assistant's job but the growth on Dottie's liver is benign. John goes to collect a takeaway to celebrate, but is beaten up badly by two men in the street after calling a woman "slut" during a tic. Dottie stays at his side in hospital and assures him the job will be waiting for him.

John starts work with Tommy, who supports and mentors him. John's tics cause a fight in a bar, and he is charged with assault. At the trial, John is unable to finish the oath without swearing at the judge, who removes him from the stand. Tommy, as character witness, defends John's behaviour as uncontrollable. John is found not guilty. Later, John goes to Tommy's house but finds him dead from a heart attack. After Tommy's funeral, John assumes that he will become unemployed, but instead is offered his job.

A family from a local hospital is referred to John to meet their daughter, who has Tourette's. John starts hosting Tourette's workshops at the community centre, and giving talks at schools and police stations to raise awareness. He is eventually awarded an MBE by the Queen in 2019. After receiving the award at Holyrood Palace, John shows the medal to his mother and explains why he did not invite her. She apologises for being short-tempered with him in his youth, and they tearfully reconcile.

In 2023, John works with researchers at University of Nottingham to test a treatment device: a non-invasive median nerve stimulation (MNS) device worn as a bracelet to calm his tics sufficiently, which allows him to remain quiet during an entire visit to the library. On the train home, he strikes up a conversation with a woman, demonstrating his growing confidence.

The film ends with footage of the real John Davidson, the subject of several BBC documentaries, starting with John's Not Mad, along with a postscript emphasising the importance of societal awareness in the management of Tourette's.

== Cast ==
- Robert Aramayo as John Davidson
  - Scott Ellis Watson as a young John
- Maxine Peake as Dottie Achenbach
- Shirley Henderson as Heather Davidson
- Peter Mullan as Tommy Trotter
- David Carlyle as Chris Achenbach
- Steven Cree as David Davidson
- Francesco Piacentini-Smith as Murray Achenbach
  - Jamie McAllistar as young Murray
- Ethan Stewart as William Davidson
- Paul Donnelly as Billy Dean
- Douglas Rankine as Doctor Colin Hargreaves
- Adam McNamara as PC/Inspector MacCullen
- Chris Dixon as James
- Anthony Capaldi as Andy
- Andrea Bisset as Lucy
- Gordon Peaston as Councillor Spalding
- Christina Modestou as Alison
- Christina Ashford as Queen Elizabeth II
- Ron Donachie as Headmaster Donald Watkins
- Holly Howden Gilchrist as Suzy

== Production ==
Robert Aramayo's casting as Davidson was revealed on 27 August 2024, and Peter Mullan's role was announced on 6 November 2024.

Director Kirk Jones later admitted that he had cast Aramayo without an audition. "I knew Robert was right for the part very early on," Jones said. "[A]nd because the finance was structured in a certain way, I was able to cast him without having to justify that decision or ask for people's permission to do it – which is the purest way to cast the film. That's how it should be done. A lot of people are surprised when I say I never asked him to do a screen test. I never asked him to audition, and that's quite unusual. The reason was, I knew that if he auditioned it would be nothing more than an impersonation of John Davidson."

Aramayo spent three months with Davidson in the latter's hometown of Galashiels, learning everything he could about Davidson's life. He also did various Zoom calls with other people with Tourette's.

Filming began in and around Glasgow between July and September 2024, wrapping in August. Locations included Strathblane Church and the Hippodrome Cinema in Bo'ness, which is Scotland's oldest cinema.

== Release ==
In February 2025, Bankside Films launched pre-sales for I Swear at the EFM; a promo shown to buyers in Berlin revealed the first-look image. The film premiered in the Centrepiece programme at the 2025 Toronto International Film Festival.

I Swear was released in the United Kingdom on 10 October 2025. In October 2025, Sony Pictures Classics acquired distribution rights to the film in the United States, Latin America, Turkey, Portugal, Southeast Asia, South Korea and most of Eastern Europe for a release on 24 April 2026. The film became available on Netflix UK in March 2026 as part of a first window deal with StudioCanal.

== Reception ==
=== Critical response ===
On the review aggregator website Rotten Tomatoes, 96% of 138 critics' reviews are positive, with an average rating of 7.9/10. The website's consensus reads: "A deft balance of prickly and sweet that's bound together by Robert Aramayo's knockout performance, I Swear doesn't sugarcoat the challenges of Tourette syndrome while delivering an uplifting tale of resilience." On Metacritic, the film has a weighted average score of 70 out of 100 based on 28 critics, which the site labels as "generally favorable" reviews.

At its premiere in September 2025, I Swear earned positive reviews for its humane tone and standout performance. Variety praised Aramayo's turn as "flawless" and described the film's balance of earnestness and subtle humour. The Guardian called it "funny, fierce and full of heart," noting how the film avoids sentimentality in portraying Tourette's. In the Financial Times, the review observed that the film "is both serious and larky," commending its tonal restraint.

=== Reaction to the portrayal of Tourette’s syndrome from academic researchers ===
The reaction to the film has been largely positive by researchers, citing how the film accurately portays what it is like to live with the condition.

However, some academics have stated that the portrayal of Tourette’s syndrome as a condition dominated by swearing is inaccurate as this is only experienced by a small percentage of people with the condition, particularly criticising the title of the film as a result.

=== Accolades ===
Award / Festival	Date of ceremony	Category	Recipient(s)	Result	Ref.
British Independent Film Awards	30 November 2025	Best British Independent Film	Kirk Jones, Georgia Bayliff and Piers Tempest	Nominated	
British Independent Film Awards	30 November 2025	Best Director	Kirk Jones	Nominated	
British Independent Film Awards	30 November 2025	Best Lead Performance	Robert Aramayo	Won	
British Independent Film Awards	30 November 2025	Best Supporting Performance	Peter Mullan	Nominated	
British Independent Film Awards	30 November 2025	Best Supporting Performance	Maxine Peake	Nominated	
British Independent Film Awards	30 November 2025	Best Supporting Performance	Scott Ellis Watson	Nominated	
British Independent Film Awards	30 November 2025	Breakthrough Performance	Scott Ellis Watson	Nominated	
British Independent Film Awards	30 November 2025	Best Screenplay	Kirk Jones	Nominated	
British Independent Film Awards	30 November 2025	Best Casting	Lauren Evans	Won	
British Academy of Film Awards	22 February 2026	Outstanding British Film	Kirk Jones, Georgia Bayliff, and Piers Tempest	Nominated	
British Academy of Film Awards	22 February 2026	Best Actor in a Leading Role	Robert Aramayo	Won	
British Academy of Film Awards	22 February 2026	Best Actor in a Supporting Role	Peter Mullan	Nominated	
British Academy of Film Awards	22 February 2026	Best Casting	Lauren Evans	Won	
British Academy of Film Awards	22 February 2026	Best Original Screenplay	Kirk Jones	Nominated	
British Academy of Film Awards	22 February 2026	EE Rising Star Award	Robert Aramayo	Won	
National Film Awards UK	1 July 2026	Best Drama	I Swear	Nominated	
National Film Awards UK	1 July 2026	Best British Film	I Swear	Won	
National Film Awards UK	1 July 2026	Outstanding Performance	Robert Aramayo	Nominated	
Casting Directors' Guild Awards	2026	Best Casting in an Independent Film	Lauren Evans, Melissa Wilkins	Won	
Casting Directors' Guild Awards	2026	Best Child Casting (All Media)	Lauren Evans, Melissa Wilkins	Nominated	
London Film Critics' Circle Awards	1 February 2026	British/Irish Film of the Year	I Swear	Nominated	
London Film Critics' Circle Awards	1 February 2026	Young British/Irish Performer of the Year	Scott Ellis Watson	Nominated	
London Film Critics' Circle Awards	1 February 2026	British/Irish Performer of the Year	Robert Aramayo	Nominated	
London Film Critics' Circle Awards	1 February 2026	Breakthrough Performer of the Year	Robert Aramayo	Won	
Miami Film Festival	20 April 2026	The Audience Feature Film Award	Kirk Jones	Runner-up	
Dublin Film Critics Circle Awards	2025	Best Film	I Swear	Runner-up	
Dublin Film Critics Circle Awards	2025	Best Actor	I Swear	Runner-up	
UK Film Critics' Association Awards	2025	Best Actor	Robert Aramayo	Nominated	
Girls on Film Awards	2 February 2026	Best Performance in a Supporting Role	Maxine Peake	Nominated	
BAFTA Scotland Awards	15 November 2026	Best Feature Film	I Swear	Won	
BAFTA Scotland Awards	15 November 2026	Best Actor — Film	Peter Mullan	Nominated	
BAFTA Scotland Awards	15 November 2026	Best Actor — Film	Robert Aramayo	Won	
BAFTA Scotland Awards	15 November 2026	Best Actor — Film	Scott Ellis Watson	Nominated	
BAFTA Scotland Awards	15 November 2026	Best Actress — Film	Shirley Henderson	Nominated	
BAFTA Scotland Awards	15 November 2026	Best Director — Fiction	Kirk Jones	Won	
BAFTA Scotland Awards	15 November 2026	Best Writer — Film/Television	Kirk Jones	Nominated	
BAFTA Scotland Awards	15 November 2026	Audience Award	Peter Mullan	Nominated	
