= Tourettes: I Swear I Can't Help It =

2009 British documentary film

- Directed by: Phillipa Robinson
- Presented by: Eleanor Bron (narrator)
- Country of origin: United Kingdom

Production
- Producer: Phillipa Robinson
- Running time: 66 minutes

Original release
- Network: BBC1
- Release: 28 May 2009

Tourettes: I Swear I Can't Help It is a QED documentary made by the BBC in 2009.

== Overview ==
The film follows John Davidson, who has Tourette syndrome, and the changes in his life since the 1989 QED documentary John's Not Mad. Another individual with Tourette syndrome, Greg, was filmed by his mother; his tics occasionally make him collapse or appear frozen. In this film, the pair meet and see how each copes with the condition.
