= Ghosts (2019 TV series) =

British sitcom (2019–2023)

- Genre: Sitcom
- Created by: Mathew Baynton; Simon Farnaby; Martha Howe-Douglas; Jim Howick; Laurence Rickard; Ben Willbond
- Written by: Mathew Baynton; Simon Farnaby; Martha Howe-Douglas; Jim Howick; Laurence Rickard; Ben Willbond
- Directed by: Tom Kingsley; Nick Collett; Simon Hynd
- Starring: Charlotte Ritchie; Kiell Smith-Bynoe; Martha Howe-Douglas; Mathew Baynton; Simon Farnaby; Lolly Adefope; Laurence Rickard; Ben Willbond; Katy Wix; Jim Howick
- Country of origin: United Kingdom
- Original language: English
- No. of series: 5
- No. of episodes: 34

Production
- Executive producers: Mathew Baynton; Simon Farnaby; Martha Howe-Douglas; Jim Howick; Laurence Rickard; Ben Willbond; Alison Carpenter; Debra Hayward; Alison Owen; Imogen Cooper; Pat Tookey-Dickinson
- Producers: Matthew Mulot; Pat Tookey-Dickinson
- Editors: Mike Holliday & Will Peverett
- Running time: 30 minutes
- Production companies: Monumental Television; Them There

Original release
- Network: BBC One
- Release: 15 April 2019 – 25 December 2023

Related
- Ghosts (American TV series); Ghosts (Australian TV series); Ghosts: The Possession of Button House

Ghosts is a British sitcom broadcast on BBC One from 15 April 2019 to 25 December 2023 and spanned five series and 34 episodes, including specials. It follows a group of ghosts from different historical periods haunting a country house while sharing the house with its new living occupants, a married couple played by Charlotte Ritchie and Kiell Smith-Bynoe. It was written and performed by the collective group Them There, who had previously worked together on productions including Horrible Histories and Yonderland.

== Premise ==
Alison Cooper unexpectedly inherits the vast but crumbling Button House from a distant relative. The house is haunted by numerous squabbling ghosts from across the ages who died on its grounds and are invisible and intangible to the living. Ignoring their solicitor's advice to sell the property, Alison and her husband Mike decide to move in and renovate it, with the idea of turning the house into a luxury hotel.

At first, the ghosts are not happy with the living couple's plans and conspire to get rid of the newcomers. After various failed attempts to scare them, Julian pushes Alison from an upstairs window, resulting in her being clinically dead for three minutes. When she awakens from an induced coma two weeks later, Alison discovers that her husband has arranged a huge mortgage, and that her near-death experience has given her the ability to see and hear the ghosts.

Initially believing the ghosts to be an after-effect of her accident, Alison eventually accepts the truth and confronts them. Because the Coopers cannot leave for financial reasons, and the ghosts are bound to the mansion's land until they can ascend into the afterlife (which they refer to as being "sucked off", unaware that the phrase is an euphemism in modern times), both sides eventually agree that they have to coexist as best they can. Meanwhile, the house requires a lot of work, and Alison and Mike devise several schemes to assist their perilous finances.

== Cast ==
=== Main ===
==== Living ====
- Charlotte Ritchie as Alison Cooper – a young woman who has inherited a mansion from Heather Button, a distant relative of unspecified relation. After being pushed out of a window by one of the ghosts, she is able to see, hear and interact with them.
- Kiell Smith-Bynoe as Michael 'Mike' Cooper – Alison's husband, who has grand plans for the house but is not adept at putting them into action. Although at first believing the ghosts to be Alison's hallucinations, Mike comes to accept them and often tries to communicate with them despite being unable to see them.

==== Ghosts ====
- Lolly Adefope as Katherine 'Kitty' Higham – an excitable, overly chummy, naïve Georgian noblewoman who wishes to be friends with everyone. She has repressed her unhappy memories of her adoptive family, particularly those of her sister. She died from the bite of a venomous spider concealed on an imported pineapple in 1780. As she is the only main ghost who is not white, some reports have speculated that the character may be inspired by the real-life story of Dido Elizabeth Belle.
- Mathew Baynton as Thomas Thorne – a melodramatic and easily infatuated Regency Period Romantic poet, who was fatally shot in a duel in 1824. He falls in love with Alison at first sight.
- Simon Farnaby as Julian Fawcett MP – a poltergeist, he is the most recently deceased ghost. A disgraced Tory MP who died of a heart attack in a 1993 sex scandal while not wearing trousers, he can physically interact with the corporeal world to a limited degree if he concentrates hard enough, typically with only a forefinger to nudge small objects or press buttons.
- Martha Howe-Douglas as Lady Stephanie 'Fanny' Button – a pompous, overbearing Edwardian lady of the manor and distantly related to Alison. She was pushed out of a window in 1912 by her adulterous husband George, and can be seen in photographs, earning her the nickname "the Grey Lady" (a ghost archetype). She unconsciously re-enacts her death every night at 3:00 am until Julian alters a clock so that she does it a few hours later, making her scream serve as a morning alarm.
- Jim Howick as Patrick 'Pat' Butcher – a friendly, polite leader of a uniformed youth group resembling scouts, who was accidentally shot through the neck with an arrow on the Button House grounds in 1984 by one of the uniformed boys in his care.
- Laurence Rickard as 'Robin'/ Rogh – The oldest ghost: a caveman who lived on the land Button House now occupies and was killed when lightning struck the tree he was using to hide from a bear. He can manipulate electricity (likely due to his lightning-related death) and enjoys playing chess, which he learned from Julian, as well as performing ancient rituals for the moon, which he calls 'Moonah'. He can also be heard by living animals. Despite speaking in broken English, his witnessing thousands of years of human history has made him very wise and level-headed.
  - Rickard also appears as the head of Sir Humphrey Bone – a Tudor nobleman who accidentally decapitated himself in 1575 after being mistakenly accused of his French wife Sophie's plot to assassinate Elizabeth I. He struggles with his body (played by Yani Xander) dropping his head and failing to pick him up.
- Ben Willbond as 'The Captain' – a stern, closeted gay World War II Army officer, who was stationed at Button House during his service, never saw frontline combat, and had secret romantic feelings for his lieutenant. Still obsessed with his time in the war and his rank as an officer, he fancies himself as the de facto leader of the ghosts and likes to orchestrate plans using military strategy. He died of a heart attack when he attempted to reconnect with his lieutenant after the war by sneaking into a combat veterans' gathering at Button House. In the fifth series, his given first name is revealed as James.
- Katy Wix as Mary Guppy (series 1–4) – a Stuart era witch trial victim who was burnt at the stake in 1612 and smoulders when stressed. The living can smell burning if they pass through her. Though Mary is timid and superstitious, she is outspoken in other ways. She has a gentle flirtation with and closeness to Robin, but ascends into the afterlife in the fourth series.

=== Recurring ===
- The plague victim ghosts – an indeterminate number of ghosts who died during the Black Death and whose bodies were buried in a plague pit under the cellar. Although they can go upstairs if they wish, they prefer the cellar and, as a result, are experts on the house's heating system. They also collectively dislike Julian. Eight of them are portrayed by the actors who play the main ghosts.
- Anya McKenna-Bruce as Jemima – a young plague victim ghost who lurks in the pantry and whose ominous singing of the nursery rhyme "Ring a Ring o' Roses" can be heard by the living and scares people and ghosts.
- Geoff McGivern as Barclay Beg-Chetwynde – Alison and Mike's neighbour with whom they have a land dispute over Button House's access road. He always gets Alison's name wrong, calling her 'Annabel'. As a wealthy businessman, Julian had previous encounters with him in life.
- Nathan Bryon as Obi – a friend of the Coopers who often appears at their home for parties.
- Bridget Christie as Annie – the ghost of a Puritan woman who died in 1711 after choking on a piece of bread and haunted Button House prior to the first series. She was close to Mary, teaching her how to speak her mind, before moving on to the afterlife.
- Jessica Knappett as Lucy – a suspicious woman who introduces herself as Alison's lost paternal half-sister, but is really trying to scam Alison into giving her part of the inheritance from their alleged shared father.
- Emma Sidi as Eleanor Higham – Kitty's abusive adoptive sister. She only regretted her unkindness when Kitty died of a venomous spider bite. Her descendants include Isabelle, Heather and Alison. An idealised version of Eleanor as remembered by Kitty is played by Charlotte Ritchie, while other characters from this fantasy are portrayed by the rest of the main cast.
- Richard Durden as Charles Worthing – Mike and Alison's solicitor, who gives Alison the news that she had inherited Button House from her distant relative Heather Button, and provides counsel for the Coopers whenever legal matters arise due to the manor.
- Peter Sandys-Clarke as Anthony Havers – the Captain's lieutenant and close friend during the war, towards whom he was unable to admit his romantic feelings.

=== Guest appearances ===
- Sophie Thompson as Bunny Beg-Chetwynde – Barclay's alcoholic wife.
- Rory Fleck Byrne as Toby Nightingale – an actor who plays Lord Byron, whom Thomas views as his rival, in a period drama filmed at Button House.
- Rosie Cavaliero as Fiona Legge – a hotel developer who attempts to buy Button House as cheaply as possible and con Alison and Mike out of money.
- Ania Marson as Lady Heather Button – the great-granddaughter of Fanny and the last Button of Button House. When she dies in the first episode at the age of 99 and moves on into the afterlife shortly after, Alison Cooper comes to inherit the house. She also appears in a flashback from Julian's first day as a ghost. Alison classes her relation to her as 'step-great-auntie'
- Jackie Clune as Gwen – a tourist who visits Button House to find proof that ghosts are real, after Lady Button appears in a photo which circulates online.
- Holli Dempsey as Isabelle Higham – the owner of Button (previously Higham) House who was in a relationship with Thomas before he died, but then married his cousin Francis, and whose descendants would inherit and live in Button House (including Alison, George Button and Heather Button). She was descended from Kitty's sister, Eleanor.
- Isabella Laughland as Clare – a woman who plans and ultimately has her wedding to partner Sam at Button House.
- Leon Herbert as Errol Cooper – Mike's father.
- Lorna Gayle as Betty Cooper – Mike's mother.
- Sujaya Dasgupta as Zara – a documentary presenter, who visits Button House to produce a show on the Bone Plot, a Catholic plot mistakenly believed to have been led by Humphrey.
- Jennifer Saunders as Lavinia Colebrooke – Fanny's mother, who determinedly planned to marry off her daughter.
- Christopher Villiers as Simeon Colebrooke – Fanny's father and a compulsive gambler.
- Rufus Wright as Lord Bummenbach – a visiting Lord who brought a pineapple to a lunch Kitty and Eleanor's father hosted, unaware it contained a venomous spider that ultimately killed Kitty.
- Anna Crilly as Joy Kielty – a representative of Mike and Alison's insurance company who investigates their claim that their guest house was struck by lightning in the series 4 finale, before they can receive the payout.
- Rich Keeble and Caroline Sheen appear as Toby and Claire, respectively – parents to two girls (Ethel and Biddy) having a birthday party at Button House.
- Michael Fenton Stevens as Tony Vanoli – a singer mistakenly booked by Mike to appear at the children's birthday at Button House.

== Production ==
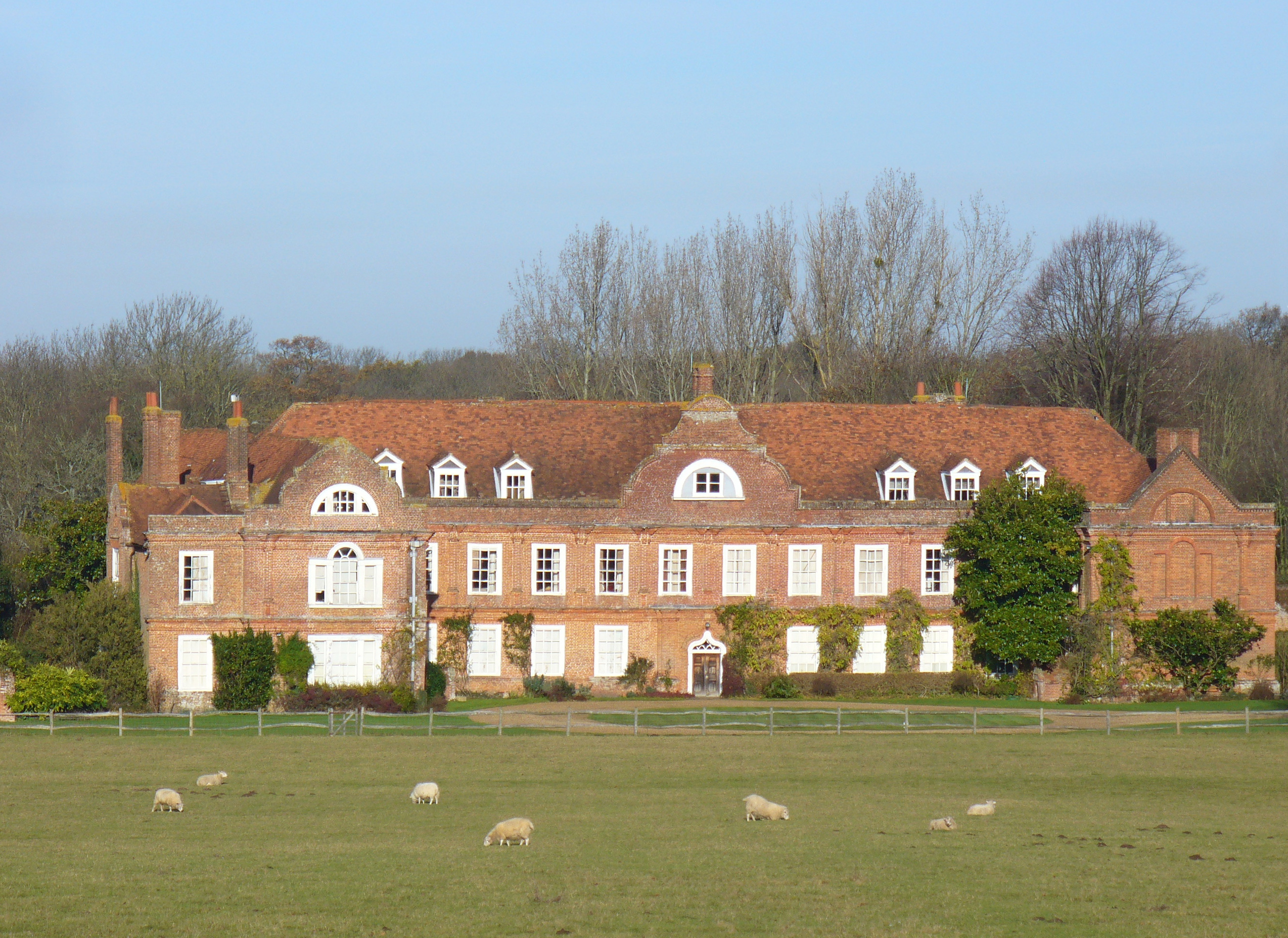
West Horsley Place in Surrey, which appears as Button House in the series.

According to Mathew Baynton, the idea of a haunted house was one of the first ideas the writers developed after the end of Horrible Histories. However, they were initially uncertain because there was "no jeopardy that we could write into it" and they created the sitcom Yonderland for Sky One instead. When that series ended, they "realised the boredom of eternity and the existential aspects of the ghosts idea was unique... We realised it was a house-share sitcom—and as soon as you stop thinking about those kind of major drama stakes, you unlock a story that is really domestic and petty." Mike and Alison, the two living characters, were introduced as a foil for the ghosts, and to introduce "the stakes, the worries about money, life and everything you need for a story".

Writing in Broadcast, Jim Howick noted that the 2016 episode of Who Do You Think You Are?, where EastEnders actor Danny Dyer discovered he was related to Edward III of England, formed the basis of the idea of Alison: "We loved the idea of Danny Dyer's royal lineage... We've mirrored this with our character Alison, who discovers her aristocratic roots, which she embraces immediately and takes on with relish."

Baynton recalled that BBC head of comedy commissioning Shane Allen was looking for a pre-watershed primetime sitcom for BBC One. During the writing process, the intention was to make an adult show, but one that would appeal to older children, along the lines of Blackadder: "We wanted to do something that has a properly creaky atmosphere. I love the idea that some kids might stay up for it. It's great as a kid when you think something isn't quite for you and it's a bit cheekier." In the event, the programme was scheduled at 9.30 on Monday evenings after the sitcom Not Going Out. Baynton noted in the i newspaper that as the original audience of Horrible Histories would now be grown up, "hopefully we're making something so they can continue to watch us!"

Baynton said the Tim Burton film Beetlejuice provided the writers a "useful tonal reference" as did The Rocky Horror Show. Jim Howick, addressing its similarity to the 1970s series Rentaghost, noted that most of the writers were either slightly too young or too old to have watched it, but the series did make knowing use of many of the clichés of horror programmes, such as headless Tudor noblemen.

The programme is filmed at West Horsley Place in Surrey, England, a large country house unexpectedly inherited by the writer and former University Challenge presenter Bamber Gascoigne in 2014 from his great-aunt, the Duchess of Roxburghe, under circumstances not dissimilar to those depicted in the series. Some scenes were also filmed on London Road and Clandon Road in nearby Guildford with outside images of the famous Bettys Tea Rooms in Harrogate, North Yorkshire rebranded as "Sandrine's" in the penultimate scene of the final episode of series three.

Filming of the second series started on 13 January 2020. It started airing, on BBC One, on 12 September that year. The series was moved to a pre-watershed slot of 8.30 pm. Production on the third series began in early 2021 and finished on 7 April 2021. It premiered on 9 August 2021. Filming of the fourth series wrapped on 16 March 2022.

Series 4 of Ghosts was covered in the BBC podcast series Inside..., which is a companion podcast to popular comedy series and offers a deeper, behind the scenes look into each episode via discussions with the writers and cast members. The Ghosts episodes are hosted by Nathan Bryon, who plays Obi, a friend of Mike and Alison in the series.

A fifth and final series, broadcast from 6 October 2023, was confirmed by the BBC in December 2022, with a final Christmas special being confirmed shortly before the broadcast of the final series.

== Episodes ==
Series	Episodes	Originally released	
Series	Episodes	First released	Last released
1	6	15 April 2019	20 May 2019
2	6	21 September 2020	26 October 2020
2	Special	23 December 2020	
3	6	9 August 2021	13 September 2021
3	Special	23 December 2021	
4	6	23 September 2022	28 October 2022
4	Special	25 December 2022	
5	6	6 October 2023	10 November 2023
5	Special	25 December 2023	

=== Series 1 (2019) ===
No. overall	No. in series	Title	Directed by	Written by	Original release date	UK viewers (millions)
1	1	"Who Do You Think You Are?"	Tom Kingsley	Mathew Baynton and Jim Howick	15 April 2019	5.50
Alison and Mike Cooper, a young married couple, are shocked to inherit the formerly great estate of Button House from a distant relative of hers. The house is haunted by a collection of invisible and intangible ghosts who died across Britain's history from prehistoric times to 1993. These ghosts retain their appearances from their deaths, can phase through walls but not floors or ceilings, cannot eat or drink but require sleep, and cannot leave the property until they can move on into the afterlife. Some of the ghosts possess unique powers related to either their lives or manners of death. Horrified by the couple's plan to turn the house into a hotel, as they experience great pain whenever living people pass through them, the ghosts unsuccessfully attempt to haunt the couple into leaving. Finally, disgraced politician Julian pushes Alison out of a first-floor window. She lands on grass and is taken to hospital by ambulance. Two weeks later, she awakes from an induced coma that left her briefly clinically dead. When she returns to the House, she learns to her horror that she can see and hear the ghosts.
2	2	"Gorilla War"	Tom Kingsley	Laurence Rickard	22 April 2019	4.93
Mike tries to convince Alison that her seeing and hearing the ghosts are after-effects of her coma. The ghosts embark on a war of attrition to try to force the couple out. With the ghosts becoming more intense, Alison visits a doctor who proves that she really can both see and hear them, being a ghost himself. Convinced they should sell the house, Mike finds out he cannot get out of the loan they took out to renovate the house without losing all of their savings. Alison attempts to reason with the ghosts, and they tell her that they want her and Mike to move out, but she refuses and tells them that she will do something for each one so that they can all co-exist peacefully. Mike comes to accept the ghosts' existences when he witnesses Julian press a keyboard key on his laptop, which appears to him as a key moving on its own, and follows the basement Plague ghosts' instructions via Alison to repair the broken heating system.
3	3	"Happy Death Day"	Tom Kingsley	Ben Willbond	29 April 2019	4.23
Scoutmaster Pat is in a melancholy mood as he prepares for a visit by members of his living family for his 'death day': his widow Carole, now married to the man with whom she had an affair, Pat's son, the son's girlfriend, and the couple's baby boy. Mike tells Alison that he hates being watched by the ghosts, especially when using the toilet. Builders start work on the house, but the ghosts try to make them leave. Alison's struggle to filter out the ghosts leads the builders to consider her eccentric and rude. Naïve Georgian noblewoman Kitty asks around to learn where babies come from and gets a variety of unhelpful answers. After meeting his grandson, who has been named in his honour, and making peace with that part of his past, Pat appears to begin moving on to the afterlife, only to learn the light shining on him is a lamp used by the builders. Fed up with Alison, the builders quit.
4	4	"Free Pass"	Tom Kingsley	Mathew Baynton and Jim Howick	6 May 2019	4.05
With money running low, Mike and Alison allow the filming of a regency period drama in the house, Life of Byron. The ghosts react in different ways to the action in their home. Romantic poet Thomas is driven to despair by his hatred of Lord Byron and Alison's crush on the lead actor. Julian pesters Alison to place a bet on a horse race for him. Pat teaches witch trial victim Mary about the art of filmmaking and discovers she has a natural talent. Robin the caveman is distracted by the studio lights, and struggles for dominance over the gaffer. Lady Fanny, unlike Kitty, is unhappy about the sex scene enacted in the bedroom. Meanwhile, Mike and Alison fail to inform the production of weight limitations imposed on the structure by the surveyors. Eventually, part of the floor collapses and the film crew promptly leaves.
5	5	"Moonah Ston"	Tom Kingsley	Martha Howe-Douglas and Laurence Rickard	13 May 2019	4.11
Mike and Alison's wealthy neighbours Barclay and Bunny Beg-Chetwynde invite themselves around for a dinner party to discuss access rights to their driveway. Barclay wants Mike and Alison to pay him £20,000 for the access rights. Mike misunderstands and shakes on it. Alison tries to win the access rights for free by cheating in a poker game, but she loses and the price jumps to £40,000. Thanks to Julian, Alison informs Barclay that she knows about his offshore bank account in Fiji, so he allows the young couple to use the land for free. Alison introduces the ghosts to Friends and they quickly become fans. Robin leads the ghosts in an ancient ritual to honour a lunar eclipse. Though this distracts Alison during the dinner party, Robin later explains that he views the moon as significant because he speculates it to be the only part of the world to have existed for as long as he has.
6	6	"Getting Out"	Tom Kingsley	Mathew Baynton and Jim Howick	20 May 2019	4.02
Having run out of capital and enthusiasm for restoring Button House themselves, Alison and Mike are ecstatic to receive an offer from a luxury hotel chain. The ghosts would prefer the couple to stay, and are disappointed when they agree to sell. The couple looks for a house to buy, but Alison rejects the two which an estate agent shows them after seeing other ghosts haunting them. Eventually, she approves of a brand new building. Fanny offers a priceless jewel to Alison to solve Button House's money problems, but Alison discovers that Fanny's husband already sold it. The Captain devises a plan to get Alison and Mike to tell the hotel chain to survey the basement as a potential place for a swimming pool and spa. During the survey, builders uncover a plague pit in the basement, and the hotel chain withdraws its offer.

=== Series 2 (2020) ===
No. overall	No. in series	Title	Directed by	Written by	Original release date	TV broadcast	UK viewers (millions)
7	1	"The Grey Lady"	Tom Kingsley	Martha Howe-Douglas and Laurence Rickard	21 September 2020	21 September 2020	4.67
With the plans to convert Button House into a hotel on hold, Alison and Mike advertise the property as a wedding venue to generate an income. However, ghost hunters are drawn to the manor after a photographer accidentally captures a photo of Fanny and shares it on social media. The couple takes advantage of the situation when offered payment for admission. Pat and Thomas try to host a radio show on EVP equipment. Alison struggles to convince the other ghosts to help out, leading her and Mike to attempt to recreate the ghosts' unique powers. Eventually the scheme is revealed when Alison tries to impersonate Fanny. They are forced to refund the ghost hunters' money, and Button House is labeled a hoax.
8	2	"About Last Night"	Tom Kingsley	Mathew Baynton and Jim Howick	21 September 2020	28 September 2020	N/A (<4.50) (Note: Not reported in the weekly top 15 programmes for four-screen viewer ratings.)
After a heavy night of partying, Alison and Mike awaken with severe hangovers and must race against the clock to prepare the house for a wedding planner to view. Alison has misplaced Fanny's beloved stuffed dog, Dante, and frantically retraces her steps. Thomas has renewed hopes of romance with Alison after something she said last night. Kitty is upset that she felt ignored during the party, despite Alison's efforts to explain the situation. Mike gets stuck on the roof with shoes and Sir Humphrey's head, which were tossed up there during drunken revelry. Because he's lost his voice, Mike can't call out for help. The still hung-over Alison throws up in front of the wedding planner and ruins any future bookings.
9	3	"Redding Weddy"	Tom Kingsley	Ben Willbond and Simon Farnaby	21 September 2020	5 October 2020	N/A (<4.36)
Alison and Mike find a new wedding planner, who tells them to clear their garden so it can be "wedding ready." Mary thinks she's finally ready to talk about her witch trial. The Captain warns Alison not to dig in a specific area of the garden, as something potentially explosive is buried there. Fanny reads Lady Chatterley's Lover and develops sexual feelings for Mike. The Captain recalls being commanding officer of a troop in Button House, and when his lieutenant Havers left for the war front, the Captain was unable to admit his romantic feelings. Back in the present, a bomb is set off in the garden and starts a fire, undoing Mary's progress. No one is physically hurt, but Alison thought "explosive" was metaphorical. The Captain explains he buried a limpet mine with its blueprints. After some scrambling, the client arrives and books the house. As everyone settles in for Film Club, the Captain remembers Havers saluting him before leaving the house, and Fanny overcomes her feelings for Mike after watching him messily eat nachos.
10	4	"The Thomas Thorne Affair"	Tom Kingsley	Mathew Baynton and Jim Howick	21 September 2020	12 October 2020	N/A (<4.78)
Mike is nervous about encountering Alison's ex-boyfriend, Kevin, at her school reunion because she has claimed she left Kevin for Mike. Thomas reveals to Alison that he died in a duel over a woman named Isabelle. Robin, Mary, and Kitty all recall the events differently. Humphrey helps Thomas realise that his cousin, Francis Button (the namesake of the house), engineered the duel and deceived Thomas into losing so Francis could court and marry Isabelle. Thomas did not die unloved, as he believed, yet this only makes him feel worse about the situation (especially as he cannot get rid of a forged letter that put Francis's plan into effect, as it forms a part of his being). Mike discovers on Facebook that Kevin is an ex-convict and boxer. Alison explains to Mike that she lied and Kevin actually broke up with her. His fears assuaged, they leave for the reunion.
11	5	"Bump in the Night"	Tom Kingsley	Martha Howe-Douglas and Laurence Rickard	21 September 2020	19 October 2020	4.09
Alison has a night out, leaving Mike alone in the house for the first time. Two burglars break in, and the ghosts phone 999 to alert the police. When the thieves cut the power and landline, the ghosts wake Mike. He phones Alison, and the ghosts tell her about the situation. Alison struggles to get home quickly. Mike tries to call the police, but his phone's battery dies. The Captain orders Kitty and Mary to keep an inventory of the stolen loot, although they have trouble with mnemonics to remember the items. Unheard by the burglars, Pat implores the younger of the two to not pursue crime, while Lady Fanny berates them for the various errors and oversights they make while stealing. Mike attempts to scare away the burglars by dressing as a ghostly knight, only to fall over due to the suit of armour's weight. Robin howls to alert the neighbouring dogs, catching Beg-Chetwynde's attention, and he uses a shotgun to stop the burglars from driving away as Alison returns home. The police arrive and arrest the criminals, although Pat is outraged to learn they will only receive probation.
12	6	"Perfect Day"	Tom Kingsley	Mathew Baynton and Jim Howick	21 September 2020	26 October 2020	3.93
A blizzard strikes on the day of the house's first wedding. Fanny is disgusted that a lesbian couple is getting married, stemming from her homosexual husband killing her after she discovered his affairs. Humphrey convinces her to accept the marriage, citing his own unhappiness from his arranged marriage. Fanny considers she may not have been murdered if her husband could have been open about his sexuality. One of the brides has doubts, but goes ahead with the wedding after a conversation with Alison, who recalls having doubts of her own. Mike overhears this and is angered. Pat recognises one of the guests as the boy that accidentally killed him and flies into a rage, but finds closure when the now-grown man pays respect to Pat outside the mansion. Mike and Alison reconcile at the reception.
Christmas Special (2020)
13	–	"The Ghost of Christmas"	Tom Kingsley	Ben Willbond and Simon Farnaby	23 December 2020	23 December 2020	5.02
Mike is playing host to his family, and is desperate to impress them. Alison also works to arrange the best Christmas, for both the living and the dead. However, their efforts are undermined when Mike's father Errol takes charge and Mike's sisters disparage the idea of singing traditional Christmas carols, which Alison had been looking forward to. While Mike and Errol reconcile, the ghosts join Alison in singing In The Bleak Midwinter. Julian reflects on how he neglected his wife and daughter and feels guilty that he never saw the latter grow up. He then bonds with Nancy, the baby of Mike's sister Angela, as infants can see ghosts due to their minds being more open to the existence of the supernatural. Julian later looks up his daughter Rachel on the Internet and discovers that she grew up to be a Green Party MP. Though he disapproves of her politics, he is still proud of her.

=== Series 3 (2021) ===
No. overall	No. in series	Title	Directed by	Written by	Original release date	TV broadcast	UK viewers (millions) 7-day
14	1	"The Bone Plot"	Nick Collett	Laurence Rickard	9 August 2021	9 August 2021	4.31
A documentary about the Tudor period is being filmed at Button House, prompting Humphrey to recall his death. When he learnt that his French wife, Sophie, plotted to assassinate Queen Elizabeth I, he was unjustly framed for the conspiracy and fled the Queen's guards. Most people believe the guards beheaded Humphrey on the spot, but he was actually beheaded when he banged his fist against a fireplace where he was hiding, causing two swords to come loose from the wall and swing down onto his neck. When nosy neighbour Barclay Beg-Chetwynde is desperate to take part in the documentary, Julian tries to force him off the estate when he spots what he believes to be signs of a heart attack (but what is really just an uncomfortable shirt label), fearing he will die and the ghosts will be stuck with him for eternity. Meanwhile, Thomas gives Alison elocution lessons when she is pestered to feature in the documentary. The rest of the ghosts attempt to make Fanny and the Captain laugh. Mike struggles to commission a t-shirt to advertise Button House, and he's frustrated when the design turns out to be unflattering when worn.
15	2	"A Lot to Take In"	Nick Collett	Mathew Baynton and Jim Howick	9 August 2021	16 August 2021	3.74
Mike begins his new job as an insurance caller but is suffering from first day nerves. At the same time, Alison is visited by a mysterious young woman named Lucy who unexpectedly shows up at Button House, claiming to be her long lost half-sister. Meanwhile, Julian recalls when he first became a ghost, and how disorienting and frightening it was. Mike finds he's not cut out to be a telemarketer, but after he happily listens to a woman's life story she offers him a new job.
16	3	"The Woodworm Men"	Nick Collett	Mathew Baynton and Jim Howick	9 August 2021	23 August 2021	3.87
Button House is being fumigated for woodworm, causing Alison and Mike to camp outside for the night. A spooked Mary tries to make the fumigators leave the house, believing them to be demons from Hell. Alison puts on the film Grease for Kitty to watch, but Julian changes the channel to watch something more 'grown up' and leaves the TV on a horror channel. Unknowingly watching A Nightmare on Elm Street, Kitty gets frightened when Mike knocks out the electricity while trying to turn on an electric heater. A series of events terrifies the ghosts inside the house, leading them to join Alison outside. Alison and Mike compete to see who is the best camper, but Alison cheats when Pat offers his wilderness knowledge, to the chagrin of the Captain, who struggles to help Mike. Mike tries his hand at glamping. Thomas laments that his Grand Tour didn't spark his creativity. Unable to sleep due to the ghosts incessantly talking, Alison goes to Mike's tent and tells him he wins the competition. Kitty tells Alison about the scary film, and she quickly deduces that Julian changed the channel.
17	4	"I Love Lucy"	Nick Collett	Laurence Rickard and Ben Willbond	9 August 2021	30 August 2021	4.59
Alison is advised by her solicitor to obtain evidence of Lucy's familial relations for the sake of her inheritance. Now doubting Lucy, Alison enlists the Captain's help to detect anything suspicious when Lucy stays over for a night. Mike adapts to his new job as a line manager, but becomes agitated at Julian when he instigates a misunderstanding with Mike's boss. When Alison reluctantly asks Lucy to submit DNA evidence to prove their familial relations, Lucy becomes offended and leaves. Meanwhile, Fanny's odd behaviour leads to the shocking discovery that she is carrying on a secret love affair with Humphrey's body. Humphrey's head struggles with this situation but, with the encouragement of Mary and Pat, accepts the relationship and offers to join his body, but Fanny ends the affair immediately, saying that he ruined it. Whilst Humphrey's head believes it all for the best, his body responds by punching his head off in anger.
18	5	"Something to Share?"	Nick Collett	Mathew Baynton and Jim Howick	9 August 2021	6 September 2021	4.47
On Kitty's 263rd birthday, Alison is eager to know about Kitty's sister, whom the ghosts claim was not as nice as Kitty would like to remember. Alison encourages Kitty to open up, but the ghosts try to stop the therapy session, fearing she may have a breakdown. Alison learns Kitty was mistreated by her adoptive sister out of rivalry over inheritance and their father's affection, but Kitty remains in blissful denial. From the session, Pat realises that his wife had an affair because of his rigidly ordered lifestyle, Julian realises his feeling of regret over abandoning his daughter, the Captain almost comes out about his repressed homosexuality, and Mary relates to the group her terrifying recurring nightmare. Meanwhile, Mike becomes frustrated about not being able to communicate with the ghosts and seeks the aid of black magic from online sources. A case of mistaken identity causes him to falsely believe his efforts were successful. After Alison and the ghosts experience Mary's nightmare, Mike is relieved that he cannot communicate with the latter.
19	6	"Part of the Family"	Nick Collett	Mathew Baynton and Ben Willbond	9 August 2021	13 September 2021	4.49
The couple has successfully saved up enough money through their jobs and event bookings at Button House to continue renovations for their hotel project. Alison reconnects with Lucy and offers to loan her money to help Lucy's failing business. However, the ghosts uncover Lucy's true intentions as a con artist when they discover Lucy faked the photograph of Alison's father, which she used as proof of their blood relation. Meanwhile, Mike receives unexpected help from Julian while trying to film a video to promote Button House. Alison and Mike expose Lucy's scam before she can take their money.
Christmas Special (2021)
20	–	"He Came!"	Nick Collett	Laurence Rickard and Martha Howe-Douglas	23 December 2021	23 December 2021	4.50
With Christmas fast approaching, Alison and Mike discover a man named Nicholas living in a tent on their grounds. They let him temporarily stay, but as days turn to weeks, the couple tires of the man that Kitty is convinced is Santa Claus. Fanny is sympathetic, as she married into the Button family to save her parents from financial ruin, as is the Captain when he learns that Nicholas is ex-military. Robin learns about land ownership rights and tries to negotiate back rent with Alison for squatting, believing himself to be the rightful owner of the land. Alison paints a portrait of Thomas, but he frets over not liking the finished result. After reporting Nicholas to the police, Alison and Mike make amends by hosting a charity Christmas dinner.

=== Series 4 (2022) ===
No. overall	No. in series	Title	Directed by	Written by	Original release date	TV broadcast	UK viewers (millions) 7-day
21	1	"Happy Holiday"	Simon Hynd	Mathew Baynton and Jim Howick	23 September 2022	23 September 2022	4.18
Alison and Mike have put their plans for the main Button House on hold and converted the gatehouse into Gatehouse Bed and Breakfast. When their first guests arrive, they worry desperately about how much they are enjoying the stay, while Pat takes the opportunity to teach Mary about what holidays are. Meanwhile, Thomas deals with the fallout of Alison's portrait of him making him an unexpected local celebrity with the plague victims, and Robin tries to convince the others that he was acquainted with a caveman whose remains' discovery has made the news. A documentary reveals that Hat, the caveman in question, died from hypothermia after giving away the pelts Robin now wears in exchange for a tool.
22	2	"Speak as ye choose"	Simon Hynd	Mathew Baynton and Jim Howick	23 September 2022	30 September 2022	3.58
Mike meets up with a successful former college friend and his partner who have chosen to stay at Button House, but their offer for him and Alison to join them in a business growth meeting turns out to be more than a little suspicious. Mary finally opens up about how her earlier centuries as a ghost, with the help of her friend Annie, taught her to speak her mind, Kitty shows the Captain how to enjoy doing nothing, and Thomas struggles to get over his infatuation with Alison, attempting to go 'cold turkey' to rather peculiar results.
23	3	"The Hardest Word"	Simon Hynd	Laurence Rickard	23 September 2022	7 October 2022	3.67
Alison tells off the ghosts for their recent behaviour, so they try to work out how to apologise to her. After encouraging Alison to take a break from the ghosts and managing the bed and breakfast, Mike attempts to organise a tightly scheduled day off for her. Although the ghosts attempt to sing Alison a Band Aid-inspired apology song, she vents her frustration about how they demand a lot of her without ever thanking her; the ghosts then post a fake five-star review in recognition of what she does for them.
24	4	"Gone Gone"	Simon Hynd	Ben Willbond	23 September 2022	14 October 2022	3.54
A booking mixup for a birthday party at Button House leaves Alison and Mike realising that they are not catering for two 86-year-olds, but 8- and 6-year-olds instead, and Mike is forced to organise the emergency change of plans. When Mary suddenly and unexpectedly ascends into the afterlife, Alison and the ghosts have to find ways to deal with their grief. Robin, who has grown accustomed to ghosts moving on and was watching a family of mice when Mary ascended, ultimately helps them by explaining that he remembers every ghost who previously haunted the land with him by naming a star after them, which he then does for Mary.
25	5	"Poached Guests"	Simon Hynd	Laurence Rickard and Ben Willbond	23 September 2022	21 October 2022	3.42
Barclay Beg-Chetwynde learns of Alison and Mike's new B&B and becomes determined to beat her at her own game by luring customers to his country estate by any unscrupulous means necessary, leaving Alison forced to turn for help from Julian, whom she considers Barclay's moral equal. While Mike is busy regretting buying miniature zorbing balls to liven up the B&B, the other ghosts are too busy to notice because they have discovered another ghost called Maddocks in the neighbouring field, much to his annoyance.
26	6	"Not Again"	Simon Hynd	Martha Howe-Douglas and Laurence Rickard	23 September 2022	29 October 2022	3.41
Having finally achieved a five-star rating for the B&B, Alison sends Mike to an auction to obtain some new chairs but he instead brings home a giant stuffed bear. While they argue about it, Robin is terrified of this new arrival. A flashback reveals that two of his friends were killed by a bear during a hunt; he escaped by climbing a tree, only to be killed when the tree was struck by lightning. Alison and Mike keep moving the bear around the house, scaring Robin further, until Mike takes it outside as a thunderstorm hits and he shelters under the tree where Robin, whose real name turns out to be Rogh, died. Realising the danger, Robin runs out into the storm and draws the lightning to himself, thereby saving Mike. He and Alison then reconcile shortly before the Gatehouse is struck by lightning and catches fire. The Coopers and the ghosts stare at the burning wreckage of the Gatehouse, wondering how they can raise money to save it, and whether it is worth the effort. Meanwhile, Julian attempts to prove to the other ghosts that he is not morally vacuous, and Thomas and Pat become fascinated by the concept of veganism.
Christmas Special (2022)
27	–	"It's Behind You"	Simon Hynd	Mathew Baynton and Jim Howick	25 December 2022	25 December 2022	5.93
At an archery demonstration hosted at Button House, the organiser mentions to Alison that he knew Pat and still has several of his home videos. She agrees to digitise them, wishing to show them to Pat at Christmas. However, after being tempted by Julian into taking a sneak peek at the Christmas presents Alison bought all the ghosts, Pat is disheartened after watching his family apparently mock him. While the Coopers plan to spend Christmas Day with Mike's family, the ghosts take the opportunity to rehearse a pantomime as a present for Alison. With Pat still upset from the home videos, he abandons leading the rehearsals, which descend into anarchy as a result; Robin reassures Pat that even though his family made fun of him, they still loved him, much like the ghosts of Button House do. After the Coopers spend Christmas Day trapped in a traffic jam, Alison and the plague ghosts watch the ghosts' pantomime of Cinderella (while Mike, who cannot see them, plays on his tablet). When Alison shows the ghosts their presents, Pat confesses that he already saw his; Alison cheers Pat up by showing him videos made after his death by his son, which show his family remembering him fondly.

=== Series 5 (2023) ===
No. overall	No. in series	Title	Directed by	Written by	Original release date	TV broadcast	UK viewers (millions) 7-day
28	1	"Fools"	Simon Hynd	Laurence Rickard	6 October 2023	6 October 2023	4.25
On April Fools' Day, most of the ghosts prank Alison as she wakes up by making her think she cannot see or hear them any more. Desiring revenge, she teams up with the equally hard-done-by Humphrey to get their own back, trying to prank each of the other ghosts one by one in order of gullibility before midday, but Pat remains stubbornly hard to fool owing to his years of experience as a scoutmaster. Meanwhile, Mike receives a visit from their insurance company to make a claim on the B&B fire and he realises how implausible the story behind it sounds. With midday passed and their insurance claim secured, Alison surprises Mike with one more piece of unexpected news: she is pregnant.
29	2	"Home"	Simon Hynd	Mathew Baynton and Jim Howick	6 October 2023	13 October 2023	3.85
Mike is anxious about being a good father. After learning that many of Button House's antiques have lost their value due to damage, the Coopers decide to sell off land to raise money for when the baby comes. Only Fanny objects, with the other ghosts not being bothered about it due to the stretch of land in question being out of the way. After discovering that it is part of the green belt, the Coopers decide to sell it to a golf resort, however, Fanny's eulogising over Button House provides inspiration for Thomas' entry in a poetry competition with the theme of "Home". Meanwhile, Kitty becomes convinced that she is sharing Alison's pregnancy side effects while Pat and Julian debate the merits of north versus south.
30	3	"Pineapple Day"	Simon Hynd	Mathew Baynton and Jim Howick	6 October 2023	20 October 2023	4.11
After a surveyor reveals that the land that the Coopers wish to sell can only accommodate a twelve-hole golf course, they try to negotiate with Barclay Beg-Chetwynde for the sale of additional land, although he attempts to drive a hard bargain. After Mike and Barclay are accidentally locked in the house's walk-in safe, Barclay agrees to a fair sale of his land after bonding with Mike (although Mike suggests to Alison that he engineered the situation to achieve said outcome). Meanwhile, after Alison discovers an accounts book from when Kitty died, she casually mentions how she died after drifting to sleep, raising the suspicions of the other ghosts. After investigating Kitty's death, during which both Kitty's jealous sister Eleanor and Lord Bummenbach, a visitor to Higham House who Kitty overheard was embezzling from the King, are suspected of killing her, the ghosts learn from Robin that she was killed by a venomous spider hiding in a pineapple presented as a gift; they also learn that, by Kitty's deathbed, Eleanor apologised for her harsh treatment of her. Also, several of the ghosts complain that Button House has not received a blue plaque dedicated to them; after Alison applies for one, it is dedicated to Henry VIII.
31	4	"En Français"	Simon Hynd	Laurence Rickard and Ben Willbond	6 October 2023	27 October 2023	4.09
During a visit by a representative of the French-owned resort company that wishes to purchase the Coopers' land to sign off on the requisite paperwork, Mike tries to persuade her of his idea of opening up Button House as an unofficial members' bar, against Alison's advice. After hearing Mike's attempts to learn French, Robin reveals that he can speak fluent French, much to the amazement of everyone else. Through flashbacks, it is revealed that Robin learnt French by listening to Lady Sophie Bone. Humphrey is outraged at this, although Robin states that he could only listen and Humphrey admits to his frustration with his marriage. After Mike accidentally triggers the company representative's nut allergy while demonstrating his idea, Robin and Humphrey help guide Alison to her epi-pen. Despite this, and the representative's translator thinking that Alison is mad after witnessing her talk to the ghosts, the sale goes through. Meanwhile, after the ghosts get into a rut with their normal activities, they decide to play quiz-show-style games adapted to their disembodied states and limited knowledge bases, with limited success.
32	5	"Carpe Diem"	Simon Hynd	Laurence Rickard and Ben Willbond	6 October 2023	3 November 2023	4.10
On the 'Annie-versary' (the day Annie moved on to the afterlife), Robin predicts that one of the ghosts will ascend as well before midnight that day. Kitty attempts to help reunite Humphrey's head and body; Fanny attempts to achieve several 'bucket list' activities; Thomas laments his failure to leave a legacy; Julian attempts to pull one of the plague ghosts (having ruled out Kitty and Fanny); Pat attempts to get everyone together to practise line dancing; Robin gets his affairs in order; and the Captain reveals the circumstances of his death, saying that he died of a heart attack after sneaking into an exclusive VE Day party by pretending to be a decorated officer, all to see his former lieutenant, Havers. Meanwhile, the Coopers attempt to have one more spontaneous night of fun before the baby arrives, by meeting with Obi and his new girlfriend Brenda.
33	6	"Last Resort"	Simon Hynd	Martha Howe-Douglas and Laurence Rickard	6 October 2023	10 November 2023	4.40
Inspired by Mike's proposal of opening up an informal members' bar at Button House, the resort company wishes to buy Button House to convert it into a golf resort. Abhorred by the idea, the ghosts attempt to charm or reason with Alison to decline the offer. During this, Pat and Robin argue over who has the best chance of wooing their favourite weather presenter; Kitty struggles to keep secret the gender of the Coopers' baby (which she discovered after accidentally passing through Alison's stomach); and Mike and Thomas attempt to console Obi after Brenda seemingly breaks up with him, although it is later revealed that she was only having difficulties with her phone. After Alison overhears Julian saying that he was responsible for her near-death experience and thus her ability to see ghosts, she decides to accept the offer. The ghosts demand that Julian apologise to Alison so that she does not go through with it. However, instead of apologising, Julian says that while he is ashamed of his actions, he does not regret them since they enriched Alison's life and the ghosts' afterlives; moved, Alison decides to decline the offer. Later, it is revealed that Kitty does not really know the baby's gender, believing that it is a boy after seeing its umbilical cord.
Christmas Special (2023)
34	–	"A Christmas Gift"	Simon Hynd	Mathew Baynton and Jim Howick	25 December 2023	25 December 2023	6.62
In the run up to Christmas, and with newborn Mia to look after, Alison and Mike are struggling to dislodge Mike's mother Betty after having stayed to help for the last seven weeks. Unfortunately for them, the ghosts, enamoured with the child because she can see them, are caught on the video baby monitor by Betty, who thus comes to believe that the house is haunted by ghosts. Despite attempting to convince her otherwise, Betty instead surprises the pair with a priest to perform an exorcism on the house, but this has no effect on the ghosts. Concluding that they have been interfering with Alison and Mike's lives as much as Betty had, the ghosts convince the pair to sell the house to the hotel firm. Several decades later, Button House has become an upscale hotel, with the basement converted into a sauna, to the delight of the Plague ghosts. An elderly Alison and Mike book into their "usual suite" that they have continued to visit annually, where Alison greets the ghosts once again as she enters.

=== Special ===
A special 7-minute-long episode for Comic Relief, broadcast on 17 March 2023, guest starring Kylie Minogue with a cameo appearance from Jason Donovan. Minogue had been due to appear in the sketch in 2022, but that appearance was cancelled due to her contracting COVID-19.

No. overall	No. in series	Title	Directed by	Written by	Original release date	BBC One broadcast	UK viewers (millions) 7-day
–	–	"Ghosts with Kylie Minogue"	Unknown	Unknown	17 March 2023	17 March 2023	N/A
Looking to raise money by hosting a music festival on the grounds of Button House, Alison and Mike welcome a visit from tour promoter Tess Ross but are stunned into silence upon meeting one of their headliners, Kylie Minogue, as is Julian, who was a fan while alive. However, seeing her thirty years later convinces him that she is an impostor. As the ghosts argue, Kylie privately reveals that she can also see ghosts following a roller skating accident while filming the "Spinning Around" music video and she quickly bonds with Alison, as does Mike with Tess. Eventually, a video call from Jason Donovan and an impromptu performance of "I Should Be So Lucky" (previously recited by Thomas for Alison in series 1) convince Julian and the others that Kylie is the real deal, but she still turns down the festival deal upon leaving due to the sheer number of ghosts in the house.

== Broadcast ==
Promotional image

Ghosts was the first post-watershed comedy by the ensemble, although some television critics said that it was suitable for adults and children alike, and it was moved to a pre-watershed slot from series 2 onwards.

Ghosts also airs on Paramount+ in the United States and CBC Gem in Canada. It was initially available in the US on Warner Bros. Discovery's HBO Max until streaming rights expired in September 2023. In November 2023, due to the 2023 Writers Guild of America strike causing a delay in production of the show's American remake, CBS began to broadcast episodes of the British series as Ghosts UK on linear US television.

== Reception ==
Reviews were positive, with critics appreciating its high joke rate, premise, and strong ensemble. On the review aggregation website Rotten Tomatoes, the first series holds approval rating of 87%, based on 15 reviews, with an average rating of 7.8/10. The website's critical consensus said: "The perfect blend of spooky and silly, Ghosts's ghastly giggles are a delight." The second series received an approval rating of 100%, based on five reviews, with an average rating of 6.7/10. The third series also received a 100% approval rating, but with a higher average rating of 8.7/10, based on six reviews.

Stuart Jeffries in The Guardian wrote: "In making us giggle at the supernatural, Ghosts is very British – a mash-up of Noël Coward's Blithe Spirit and Randall and Hopkirk (Deceased), not to mention the manifold sillinesses of Hammer horror films. But it is American in the sense of having a gag-to-airtime ratio much higher than British sitcoms normally manage these days." Michael Hogan in The Daily Telegraph was similarly positive, comparing it to the 1970s' children's sitcom Rentaghost but noting that "This deliriously daft supernatural romp, however, was none the worse for that."

Susannah Butter in the Evening Standard said the first episode reminded her of a property show, watching the couple view a terrible flat, before making their escape to the country. She was critical of the post-watershed scheduling of 9.30 pm, saying "it feels like a show that children would enjoy" and noting: "This is a gentle ensemble comedy. Alison and Mike are wide-eyed, charming and likeable. I would gladly have them as friends, even though they can't sing...Nothing about this show is scary." Carol Midgley in The Times was also confused by the scheduling, noting that "Ghosts is smut[-] and swearword-free" and calling it "a curiously life-affirming comedy about death".

Contrasting it with the bleak "sadcoms" such as Fleabag and After Life, Pat Stacey in the Irish Independent noted "It's joyously, infectiously silly, yet at the same time whip-smart. It's just the ticket to scare those sadcom blues away."

A second series was announced a week after the transmission of episode 6. The BBC Press Office announcement noted it received a consolidated average of 3.7 million viewers across the series, highlighting its popularity with 16–34-year-old viewers. On 8 October 2019, Rickard confirmed that a third series had also been commissioned.

In April 2021, the sitcom was nominated for the Scripted Comedy BAFTA Award and the Comedy Writer BAFTA Craft Award.

Series 5, released all at once on iPlayer on 6 October 2023, received particularly high praise from critics with five star reviews in The Telegraph and The Guardian. The British Film Institute hosted a preview screening of the first two episodes at the BFI Southbank, London.

== Adaptations ==
=== US adaptation ===
An American adaptation of the series was announced on 29 November 2019 by CBS. On 4 February 2020, it was announced that a pilot had been ordered to be produced by BBC Studios, Lionsgate Television and CBS Studios. On 31 March 2021, it was announced that a full series had been ordered, and the series premiered on 7 October 2021. Rose McIver and Utkarsh Ambudkar play the living couple Samantha "Sam" and Jayanth "Jay" Arondekar. The ghosts include Viking warrior Thorfinn (Devan Chandler Long, based on Robin), Lenape storyteller Sasappis (Román Zaragoza), Continental Army officer Isaac Higgintoot (Brandon Scott Jones, based on the Captain), mansion proprietor Hetty Woodstone (Rebecca Wisocky, based on Fanny), lounge singer Alberta Haynes (Danielle Pinnock), hippie Susan "Flower" Montero (Sheila Carrasco), scout leader Pete Martino (Richie Moriarty, based on Pat), and pants-less stockbroker Trevor Lefkowitz (Asher Grodman, based on Julian). A decapitated greaser named Crash (head played by Hudson Thames and Alex Boniello, body played by Matt Keyes), based on Sir Humphrey Bone, appears occasionally; and a group of cholera victims based on the Plague ghosts serve as frequently recurring characters. As of October 2025, there have been five seasons, with a sixth and seventh already commissioned.

=== Australian adaptation ===
An Australian adaptation was announced for Network 10 (whose parent company broadcasts the American adaptation) with BBC Studios Australia producing the series. Eight episodes are to be released and ghost characters include publican and Irish Great Famine survivor Eileen, naval officer Gideon, early 20th century socialite Miranda, 1980s aerobics instructor Lindy, Chinese-born Australian Gold Rush miner Joon, and 1990s motorbike gang-member "Satan". The living characters are played by Tamala Shelton and Rowan Witt. The series premiered on both Network 10 and Paramount+ on 2 November 2025.

=== Other adaptations ===
A few continental European adaptations of Ghosts have been produced, with many of the ghost characters serving as close counterparts to the original UK characters compared to those of the American and Australian adaptations due to the countries' shared histories and similar cultures.

A German adaptation was commissioned by WDR to be produced by BBC Studios Germany. Cristina do Rego and Benito Bause star as living couple Emma and Felix. The ghosts include Neanderthal Urs, Roman legionnaire Claudius, feminist maid Griet, love-hungry poet Friedrich Dorn, 19th-century aristocrat Countess Adelheid von Donnerhall, 1980s-era schoolteacher Svenni, and trouser-less 1990s-era insurance salesman Joachim. Six episodes were released on ARD's streaming platform on 7 March 2025. A second season has been commissioned.

A French adaptation entitled Ghosts: Fantômes en Héritage was produced for TF1 and Disney+. Camille Chamoux and Hafid F. Benamar star as living couple Allison Cardinet and Nabil Ben Marouk. The ghosts include prehistoric Tayac, Gaul chief Albos, naïve 16th-century peasant Berthe, 17th-century poet Augustine Montfleury, Bourbon-era aristocrat Countess Marie Catherine de Merudeaux, repentant former Nazi collaborator Francois Laval, World War II military officer Captain George Peyrache, 1980s-era scout leader Daniel "Dani" Quignon, and drunk 1990s-era pants-less politician Roland Givorant. Six episodes were released on Disney+ streaming platform on 9 April 2025.

A Greek adaptation, Τα Φαντάσματα (The Ghosts), on Star, was written by comedy writer Theodore Petropoulos and produced locally by Tanweer Productions for an autumn 2025 debut (28 September 2025). The ghost characters are a headless knight who got decapitated during the Frankokratia, romantic poet of the early 20th century Gerasimos Zidoros, army major from World War II Athanasios Karkalentzos who died by Germans during the Katochi, a Neanderthal called "Vangelis" (a name chosen for convenience, since his actual name is "The one whose mother got laid by a chimpanzee"), scoutmaster Paraskevas Papazoglou, trouser-less Member of Parliament Apostolos Nikolopoulos, virgin ancient Athenian woman Theofania who died during a raid in Roman occupation of Greece, anti-Ottoman partisan Bilio Karatasos who was burnt alive by the Turks during the Greek War of Independence, "lady of honour" of Queen Amalia of Oldenburg Kalliroi Paparigopoulou (who was pushed out of a window by her adulterous husband) and about 9 men and women who died in the Plague of Athens.

There is also a Czech adaptation in production consisting of 12 episodes and produced by TV Nova.

== Feature film ==
In February 2026 the BBC announced that a feature film, Ghosts: The Possession of Button House, was set to start filming the following month. It was released on 23 October 2026 (in time for Halloween) and is a prequel set after the living couple move out and before the renovations begin, filling the gap between the show's present-day ending and its flash-forward.

== In other media ==
Two tie-in books, The Button House Archives (2023) and Ghosts: Brought to Life (2024), have been published.
