= John Davidson (activist) =

Scottish Tourette's activist (born 1971)

John Davidson MBE
- Born: 1 June 1971 (age 55); Galashiels, Selkirkshire, Scotland
- Education: Galashiels Academy
- Occupation: Campaigner
- Years active: 1989–present

John Craig Davidson (born 1 June 1971) is a Scottish activist and campaigner for Tourette's syndrome awareness. At age 16, Davidson was the subject of the BBC television documentary John's Not Mad (1989) about the manifestations of his Tourette's. He has also appeared in several other BBC documentaries throughout his life, as well as a film biopic titled I Swear (2025) starring Robert Aramayo as Davidson.

Davidson is a "nationally known ambassador" for Tourette's awareness who gives talks and workshops for school pupils and teachers, and has organised an annual two-day residential Tourette's camp for young people. In 2019, he was appointed an MBE in recognition of "his efforts to increase understanding of the condition and helping people deal with it across the country".

== Biography ==
=== Early life and documentary subject ===
Davidson's condition encompasses a range of symptoms, including tics, coprolalia, echolalia, sudden and violent body movements, along with severe obsessive–compulsive disorder (OCD). At age 16, a BBC Television documentary was made about him, John's Not Mad (1989), which "became a major talking point" nationally.

In 2004, The Times reported that Davidson occupied a position in the psyche of 1980s schoolchildren similar to that of Joey Deacon, who had cerebral palsy, for children of the 1970s. Both were the subjects of serious television programmes about their disabilities, and both promptly became the victims of nationwide playground mocking campaigns. A follow-up BBC documentary was made about him at age 30, The Boy Can't Help It (2002), and another at age 37, titled Tourettes: I Swear I Can't Help It (2009).

=== Career and advocacy work ===
After leaving school at age 16 without qualifications, Davidson has worked as a caretaker at Langlee Community Centre in Galashiels. He has also supported several voluntary youth work initiatives. By 2002, he was a part-time youth leader at Langlee Community Centre and education complex in Galashiels.

Following the broadcast of John's Not Mad, Davidson went on to become a "nationally known ambassador for the condition", "a spokesman for this previously hidden neurological disorder, campaigning to educate people about it". In 2003, he founded a Borders support group aimed at helping the families of those with the condition.

Working with support groups such as Tourette Scotland and national organisation Tourettes Action, Davidson has visited schools, given talks, and held workshops on having Tourette's syndrome, and spoken to groups of police and school teachers on supporting people with the condition. He has organised an annual two-day residential Tourette's camp for young people in Galashiels.

"People who feel isolated in their own town can come to Galashiels for a weekend and feel part of a like-minded tribe," said John. "They can shout as loud as they like without worrying about upsetting or offending others. Hopefully, they return to their homes in better fettle and feeling stronger and less isolated."

In 2019, he was a board member of Tourette Scotland. In the 2019 New Year Honours, he was appointed a Member of the Order of the British Empire (MBE) for services to people with Tourette's Syndrome, in recognition of "his efforts to increase understanding of the condition and helping families deal with it across the country". While being presented with the award at Holyrood Palace, Davidson unexpectedly swore at Queen Elizabeth II. He said that the Queen, aware of his condition, responded with patience and understanding.

He has also been a leading member of Borders Action Group, campaigning to save public services.

=== I Swear and the BAFTAs ===
The biographical film I Swear, directed by Kirk Jones, was announced in 2024, with Robert Aramayo playing Davidson. It was released in cinemas in the United Kingdom on 10 October 2025, and later internationally on 24 April 2026.

During the 79th British Academy Film Awards on 22 February 2026, Davidson's tics were audible in the auditorium and in the television broadcast, including shouting the racial slur "nigger" while the Black actors Michael B. Jordan and Delroy Lindo presented the award for Best Special Visual Effects. This later prompted ceremony host Alan Cumming to apologise for any strong language heard throughout the broadcast, though he thanked the audience for their understanding of Tourette's. Davidson removed himself during the second half of the ceremony.

The Black American actors Jamie Foxx and Wendell Pierce condemned the moment on social media. Pierce deemed it "infuriating that the first reaction wasn't complete and full-throated apologies to Delroy Lindo and Michael B. Jordan", and Foxx claimed Davidson "meant that shit" and called the moment "unacceptable". Lindo stated that he and Jordan "did what [they] had to do" while presenting, but that he wished "someone from BAFTA [had] spoke[n] to us afterward". The Black production designer Hannah Beachler alleged that Davidson had directed racial slurs at her, saying that it was an "almost impossible" situation while criticising Cumming's "throwaway apology". The BBC apologised for not editing the incident from their broadcast of the ceremony, which was shown on a two-hour delay.

Following the ceremony, Davidson issued a public statement saying he was "deeply mortified if anyone considers [his] involuntary tics to be intentional or to carry any meaning" and reiterated that his vocal tics are involuntary. In an exclusive interview with Variety, he explained that "[his] brain works so fast and the tics have always been so aggressive that [he has] no idea when they are coming and what they will be". He also said that he intentionally sat 40 rows back from the stage, where he believed that those presenting could not hear him. He only became aware that this was not the case when Jordan and Lindo reacted to the slur. Variety also reported that Davidson had privately apologised to Jordan, Lindo, and Beachler.

Shortly after the incident, at the NAACP Image Awards, Sinners actress Jayme Lawson claimed that Davidson's disability had been "exploited." She praised Jordan and Lindo for their handling of the situation while criticising the BBC, saying that "a real lack of care was exercised for those two black men". Lawson and others, including media critic Eric Deggans, blamed the BAFTAs and BBC for failing to make the event safe and inclusive.

In response to the incident, the US variety show Saturday Night Live performed a sketch titled "Tourette's", in which several celebrities considered controversial, including Mel Gibson, J. K. Rowling, and Bill Cosby, were portrayed attributing their harmful behavior to Tourette's syndrome. Tourettes Action CEO Emma McNally, among others, criticised the sketch for "mocking a disability".

== Films ==
- John's Not Mad (1989) – Q.E.D. series, by Valerie Kaye, broadcast on the BBC One. Features Davidson.
- The Boy Can't Help It (2002) – directed by Min Clough, produced by Todd Austin, broadcast on BBC One. Features Davidson and Greg Storey.
- Tourette de France (2007) – Only Human series, broadcast on Channel 4. Includes Davidson and Keith Allen.
- Tourettes: I Swear I Can't Help It (2009) – Q.E.D. series, directed and produced by Philippa Robinson, executive produced by Todd Austin, broadcast on BBC One. Features Davidson and Storey.
- Tourettes & Me (2014) – Prospect Cymru film for BBC One, sequel to The Boy Can't Help It. Features Davidson and Storey.
- Tourette's: Teenage Tics (2016) – by Min Clough and Todd Austin, broadcast on BBC One. Features Davidson, Storey, Angela Scanlon, Rory Brown and Paul Stevenson.
- I Swear (2025) – directed by Kirk Jones, produced by CrossDay Productions and Tempo Productions. Stars Robert Aramayo as John Davidson.
