= West Horsley Place =

Country house in Surrey, England

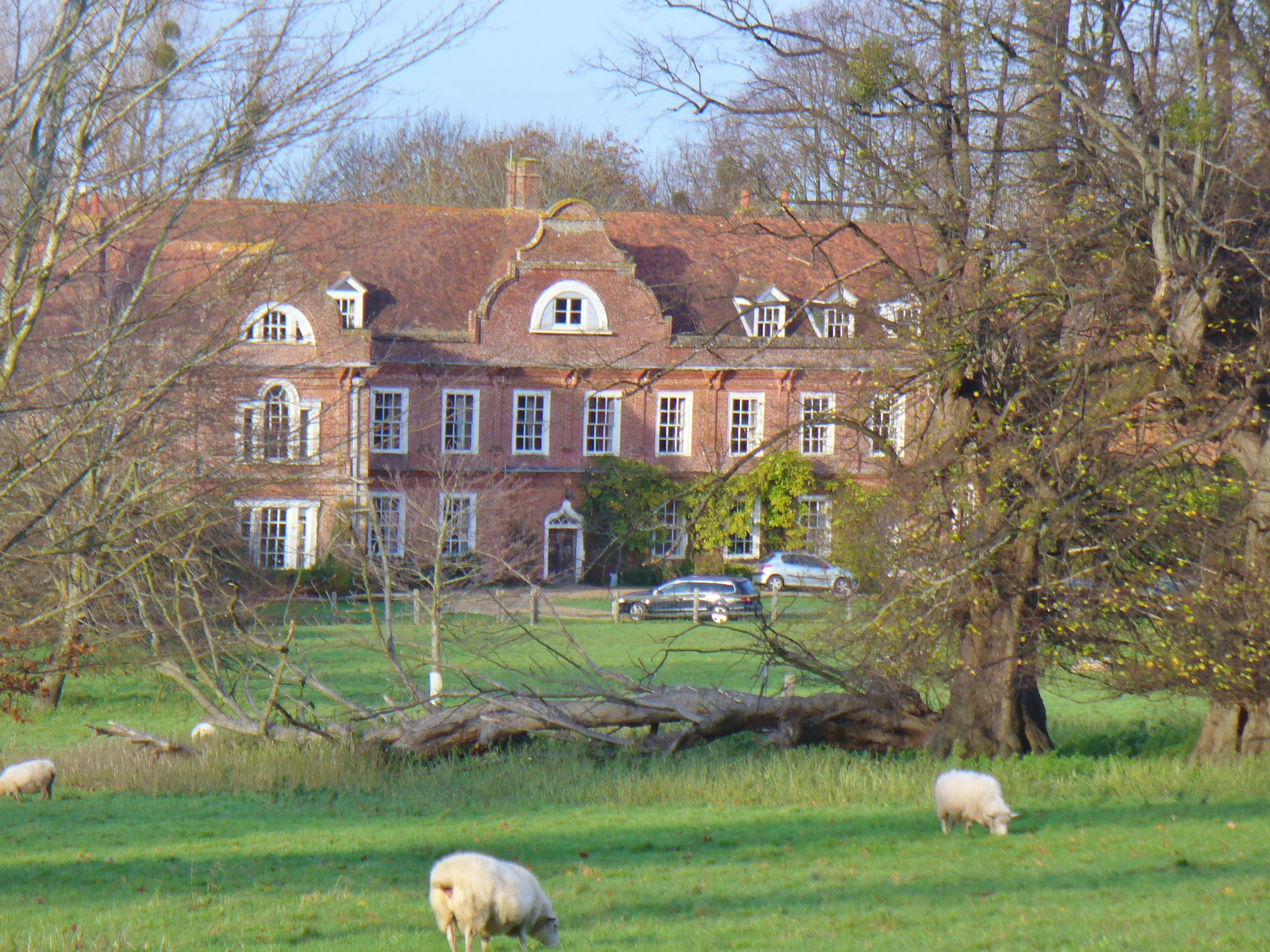
- West Horsley Place has a mid-17th century façade applied to its 15th century structure

- Location within Surrey
- 51°15′57″N 0°26′31″W
- Location: West Horsley, Surrey
- OS grid reference: TQ 08800 53011

Site notes
- Architectural style: Artisan Mannerism
- Governing body: West Horsley Place Trust
- Website: westhorsleyplace.org

Listed Building – Grade I
- Official name: West Horsley Place
- Designated: 14 June 1967
- Reference no.: 1188949

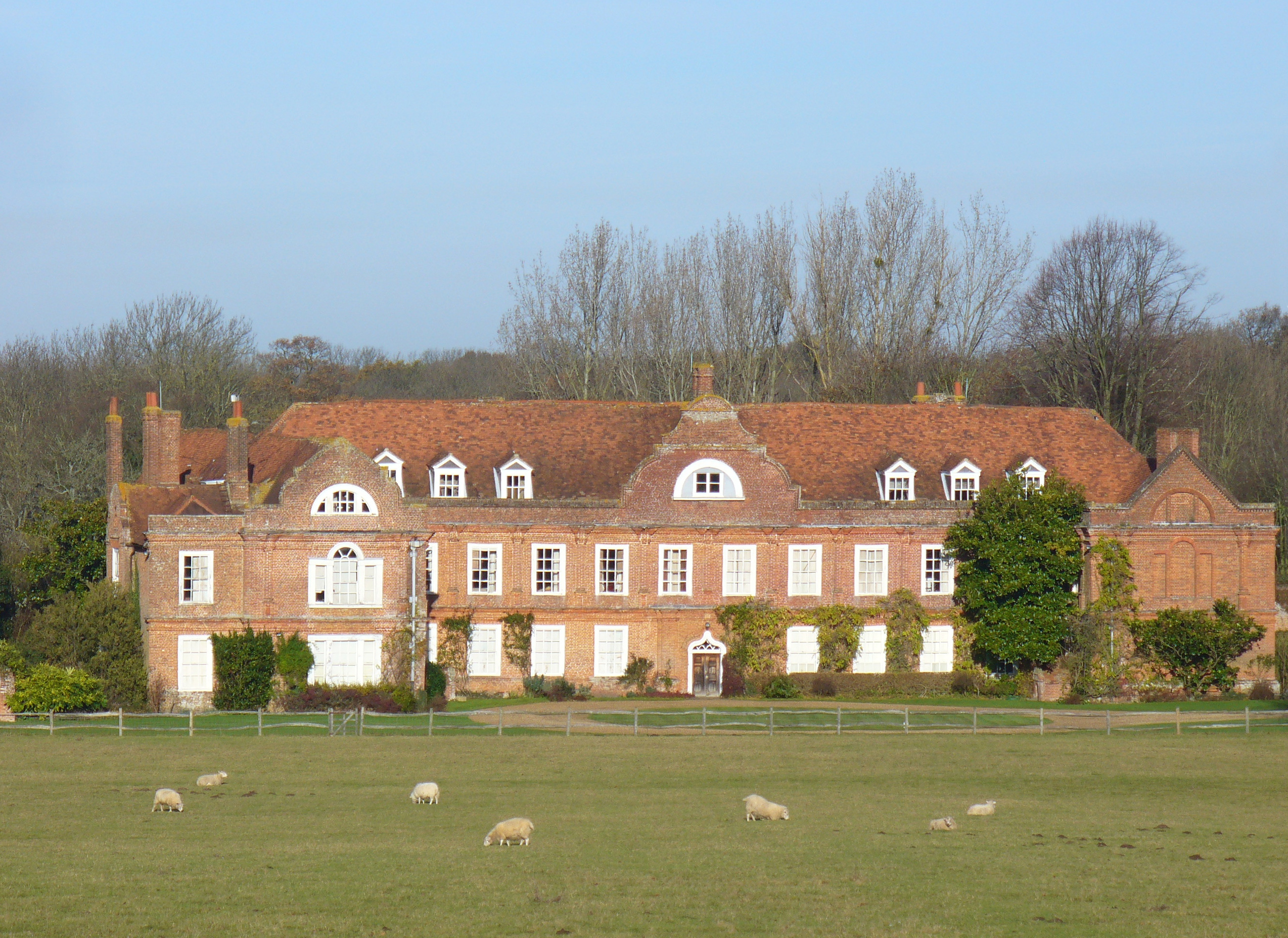
The full façade in December 2011.

West Horsley Place is a Grade I listed building dating back to the 15th century, located in West Horsley to the east of Guildford in Surrey, England. It is best known as the filming location for the BBC series Ghosts. It was inherited in 2014 by the late broadcaster and author Bamber Gascoigne who raised £8.8 million by selling off possessions, to fund restoration of the property and transferring it into the West Horsley Place Trust.

== History ==
Whilst evidence points to a building on the site from the 14th century, the current house dates back to the 15th century, and is timber-framed. It has 50 rooms. In the 16th century, it was owned by John Bourchier, 2nd Baron Berners, who made the first English translation of Froissart's Chronicles, and later by the Earl of Lincoln.

The house came into the possession of Henry VIII by the forfeiture of Henry Courtenay, 1st Marquess of Exeter in 1538. Edward VI granted the house to Anthony Browne, Master of the Horse. His widow, Elizabeth, married the Lord High Admiral, Edward Clinton, 1st Earl of Lincoln. Elizabeth I stayed at West Horsley in August 1559. She watched Robert Dudley, Master of the Horse, and other courtiers "running at the ring" from a window of the old house. The Earl had prepared a summer house in the garden for the Queen's banquet, employing a number of painters and gilders brought from London. The Master of Revels Thomas Cawarden came to Horsley, presumably to oversee some of the work and entertainments, and died at the house. Elizabeth, Countess of Lincoln's 1590 will gives an indication of the rich furnishings at West Horsley in the Elizabeth period.

The house, or the additions in the reign of Charles I, is given as a leading example by Sir John Summerson of what he calls "Artisan Mannerism", a development of Jacobean architecture led by a group of mostly London-based craftsmen still active in their guilds (called livery companies in London). It features prominently the fancy, quasi-classical gable ends that were a mark of the style. Another example, Swakeleys House in west London, shows "what a gulf there was between the taste of the Court and that of the City." Other houses in the style are the Dutch House, the surviving remnant of Kew Palace, and Slyfield Manor, near Guildford.

It was later rented by Henry Currie, the Conservative MP for Guildford, from 1847 to 1852. In 1868, the place was used for fox hunting. When owner Laura Mary Fielder died in 1908, West Horsley Place was valued at £62,536 (equivalent to £6.5 million in 2025).

In 1931, it was acquired by Robert Crewe-Milnes, 1st Marquess of Crewe, and his wife, the Marchioness of Crewe. The Marquess died in 1945 and, on her death in 1967, his widow, Peggy née Primrose, left it to their daughter, Mary Innes-Ker, Duchess of Roxburghe (1915–2014). The Duchess closed much of the house, living in a five-room section.

When the 99-year-old Duchess died in 2014, it was "accidentally" inherited by her (then) 80-year-old grand-nephew, broadcaster and author Bamber Gascoigne. The Duchess was childless, but had numerous grand-nieces and grand-nephews. Gascoigne had no idea she had picked him to solely inherit the property, and learned of it when a solicitor contacted him after his great-aunt's death.

To raise money to restore the somewhat dilapidated 50-room house, Gascoigne arranged for the Duchess's possessions—some found under cobwebs in the closed-up sections of the house—to be auctioned by Sotheby's in London and Geneva. Originally expected to raise £2.2 million, the auction raised £8.8 million, with her Cartier diamond engagement ring selling for £167,000, 14 times its estimate. Gascoigne subsequently transferred ownership of the house and estate to the West Horsley Place Trust.

The Trust holds regular guided tours and open days of the house and gardens. The grounds are regularly used for events, concerts, art workshops and filming, and the main house and converted Place Farm Barn are available for occasional hire. In 2021 the Trust hosted its first wedding ceremony.

== In popular culture ==
The house was the location for much of the filming of the 2015 ITV television film Harry Price: Ghost Hunter, and the BBC sitcom Ghosts, where it was called Button House. Interior scenes of the 2020 film Enola Holmes were also shot there. The house also featured in the 2026 film Ghosts: The Possession of Button House.

Other productions using West Horsley Place as a location include My Cousin Rachel, Mothering Sunday, Cuckoo and The Crown.

== Grange Park Opera ==
Grange Park Opera took up residence in a purpose-built 700-seat theatre in the grounds, with its inaugural production of Puccini's Tosca, led by the Maltese tenor Joseph Calleja, on 8 June 2017. The lease on the theatre is for 99 years. The planning application for the Theatre in the Woods met with some opposition due to its being in the Metropolitan Green Belt, but with the support of conductor Stephen Barlow and others, the project was approved by the Guildford Borough Council in May 2016.
