= Lolly Adefope =

English comedian, actress (born 1990/1991)

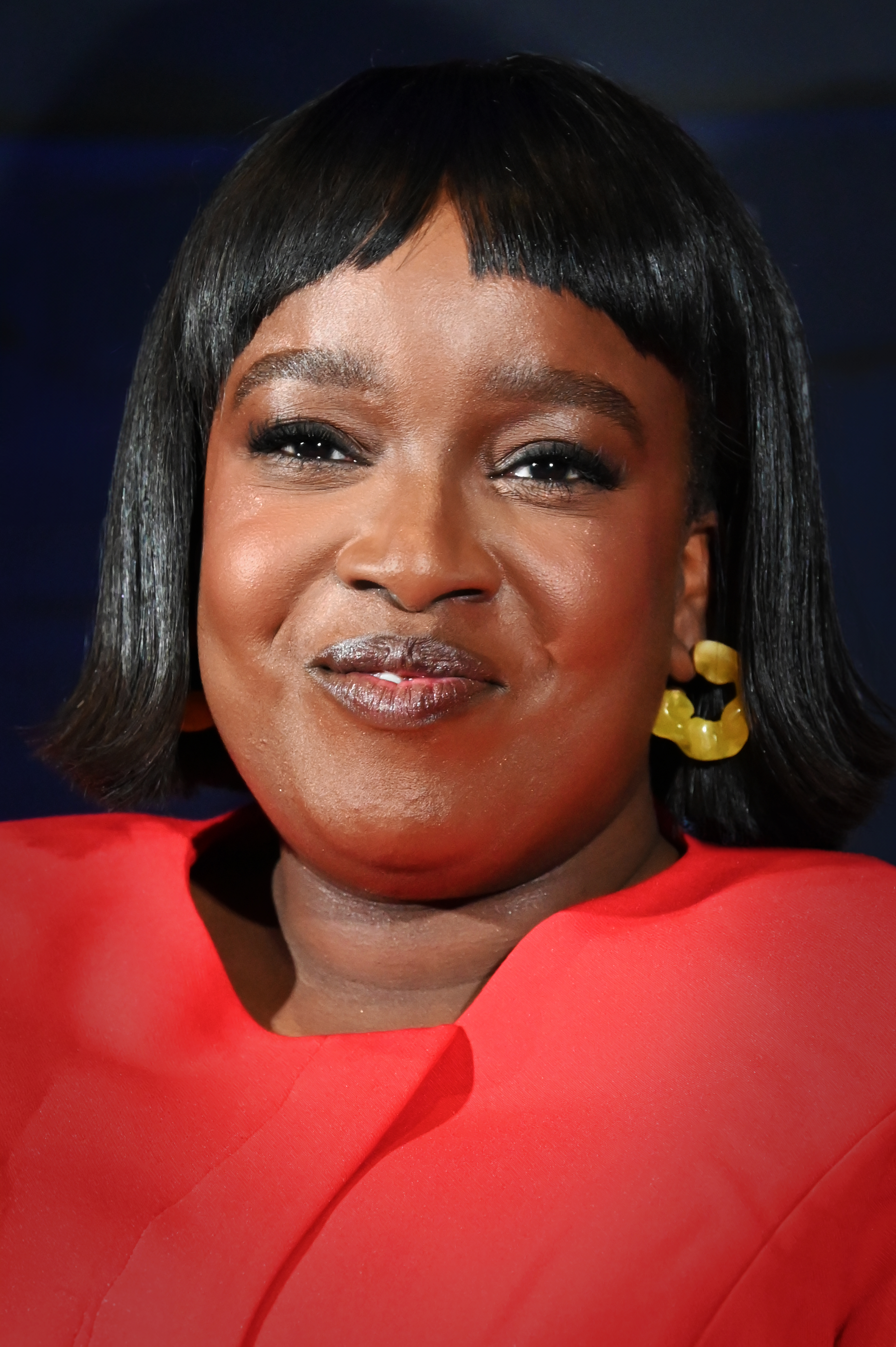
- Adefope in 2024
- Born: Ololade Adefope; 1990/1991 (age 35–36); London, England
- Education: Loughborough University
- Occupations: Comedian, actress
- Years active: 2014–present

Ololade "Lolly" Adefope (born 1990/1991) is an English stand-up comedian and actress, specialising in character comedy. She is known for playing the role of Fran in the Hulu comedy series Shrill, and as Kitty, the ghost of a Georgian noblewoman, in the BBC comedy Ghosts, for which she was nominated for a National Comedy Award in 2021.

== Early life and education ==
Adefope was born in South London to Nigerian parents. She went to Loughborough University to study English literature. While at university, she started performing with a sketch comedy group.

== Career ==
After university, Adefope applied to drama school but was rejected, so she began working in an office. She began her career as a stand-up comic and transitioned into acting after receiving positive attention for solo shows at the Edinburgh Fringe Festival in 2015 and 2016. Also in 2015, she was selected for the BBC Writersroom comedy programme, and in 2016 she was nominated for two Chortle Awards.

As an actress, Adefope has appeared on Together, Josh, Plebs, Rovers, Sick Note, Ghosts – for which she was nominated for a National Comedy Award in 2021, Miracle Workers and Shrill. She has also participated as a guest on Alan Davies: As Yet Untitled, The Last Leg, Don't Ask Me Ask Britain and QI. She appeared on the fourth series of the panel show Taskmaster and the 100th anniversary suffragette special of 8 Out of 10 Cats Does Countdown.

Shrill star and co-creator Aidy Bryant has praised Adefope's acting for "how much she can convey with just the slightest movement of her eyes." Her performance in that show introduced her to wider audiences, and she began to receive a flood of offers for new roles.

In 2025, Adefope was nominated for a BAFTA award for The Franchise. She was named one of Vanity Fair’s Rising Stars of 2025. She is a judge for the Children’s Booker Prize 2027.

== Filmography ==
=== Film ===
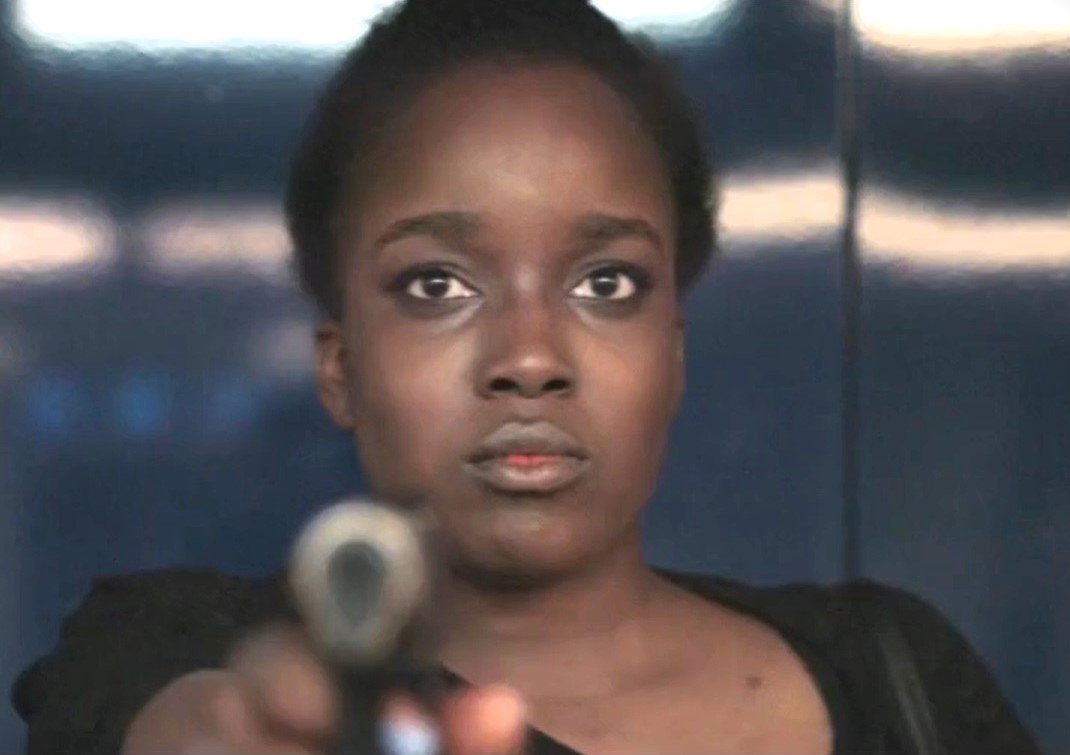
Adefope in Lolly in Marseille end scene, 2015

Year	Title	Role	Note
2015	Lolly in Marseille	Lolly	Short film
2018	The Spy Who Dumped Me	Tess	
2018	Mission: Impossible – Fallout	Woman at desk	
2019	Sorry	Dolly Adesina	Short film
2023	Saltburn	Lady Daphne	
2023	Wicked Little Letters	Kate	
2024	Seize Them!	Shulmay	
2024	That Christmas	Mrs. McNutt (voice)	
2026	Swapped	Lily (voice)	
2026	Ghosts: The Possession of Button House	Kitty Higham	

=== Television ===
Year	Title	Role	Notes
2015	Josh	Cath	Episode: "Suited and Booted"
2015	Troy: Cyber Hijack	Waitress	TV movie
2015	Lolly Adefope's Christmas	Herself	TV movie
2016	Alan Davies: As Yet Untitled	Herself	Episode: "Hitler & Jingle"
2016	Plebs	Atilla	Episode: "The Beasts"
2016	QI	Herself	Panel game / Quiz show, 1 episode
2016	Rovers	Sam	Main cast
2016	The Last Leg	Herself	2 episodes
2016	Sexy Murder	Jessica Arkwright	Miniseries, Episode: "The Flames of Innocence"
2016	Year Friends	Lolly	Episode: "September"
2017	Dara O Briain's Go 8 Bit	Herself	Panel game, 1 episode
2017	Loaded	Naomi	Main cast
2017	Sick Note	Lisa	2 episodes
2017	Taskmaster	Herself	Panel game, 8 episodes
2017	Pls Like	Chloe Sass	Web series, episode: "Fashion & Beauty"
2017	Motherland	Penny	Episode: "The Cavalry"
2017–2018	Horrible Histories	Various characters	Main cast (Series 7)
2018	Damned	Mimi	Main cast (Series 2)
2018	Lovesick	Charlotte	Episode: "Evie (Again)"
2018	Richard Osman's House of Games	Herself	Quiz show, 5 episodes
2018	Hang Ups	Angie Henderson	2 episodes
2018	8 Out of 10 Cats Does Countdown	Herself	Panel game, 1 episode
2019–2021	Shrill	Fran	Main cast
2019–2020, 2023	Miracle Workers	Rosie, Maggie, NeuralNet	Main cast (Seasons 1-2, 4)
2019–2021	This Time with Alan Partridge	Ruth Duggan	Main cast
2019–2023	Ghosts	Kitty	Main cast
2020	Feel Good	Florence (photographer)	1 episode
2021	Summer Camp Island	Snowflake	Episode: "Shave a Little Off the Wheel"
2021	There’s Something About Movies	Herself	Panel game, 1 episode
2022	Chivalry	Ama	2 episodes
2022	Don't Hug Me I'm Scared	Elevator/Mrs. Grelch	Web series, 2 episodes
2023	Everyone Else Burns	Miss Simmons	Main cast
2023	Black Mirror	Joan's Lawyer	Episode: "Joan Is Awful"
2024	The Franchise	Dagmara "Dag" Nwaeze	Main cast
