= Peter Sandys-Clarke =

British actor (born 1981)

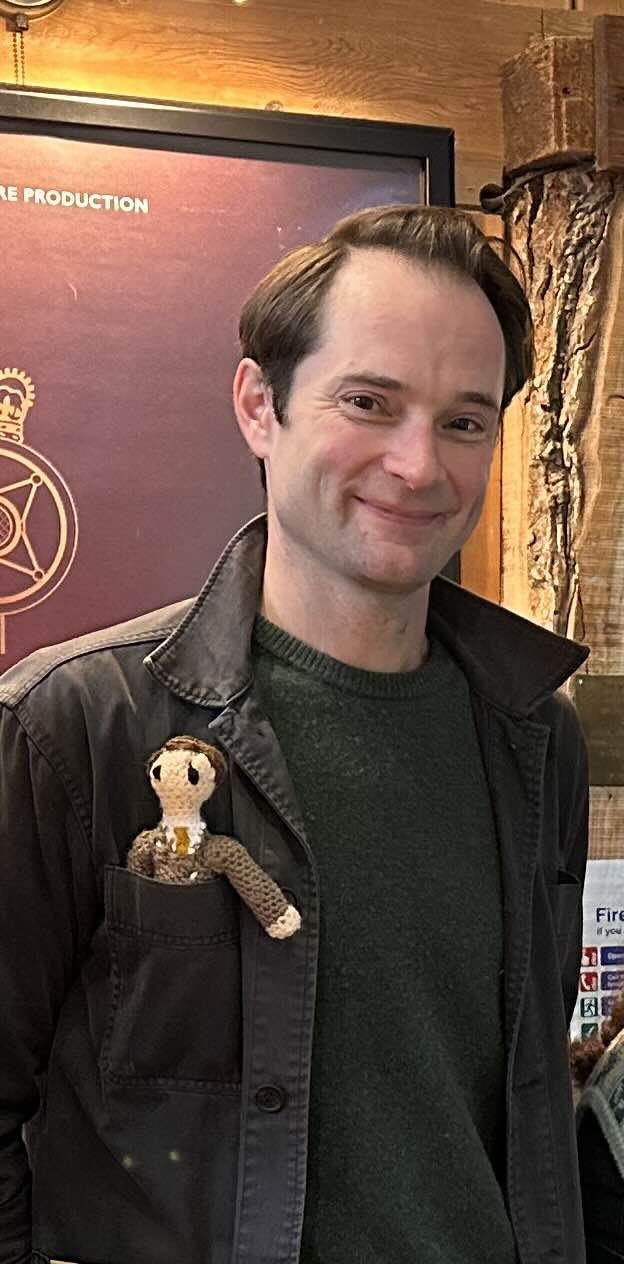
- Born: July 11, 1981 (age 45); Darlington, County Durham
- Occupation: Actor
- Known for: Desperate Romantics; Ghosts

Peter Sandys-Clarke (born 11th July, 1981, in Darlington, County Durham) is an English stage and television actor. He played Edward Burne-Jones in the 2009 BBC2 series Desperate Romantics.

In theatre he has appeared in productions including The Letter, Jingo, and Journey's End (Duke of York's Theatre, as 2Lt Raleigh), in which one reviewer called his performance "faultless". He has also appeared as Freddy in Pygmalion, and in When We Are Married by J. B. Priestley. In 2024 he played Bertie in The Watermill Theatre production of The King's Speech.

He has also appeared in Foyle's War (as Mark Wilcox), The Play's the Thing, Frankie Howerd: Rather You Than Me, Torchwood, and Bonekickers. In 2020 and 2023, he portrayed Lieutenant (later Major) Anthony Havers in the BBC sitcom Ghosts.

His grandfather was Willward Alexander Sandys-Clarke VC.

== Acting credits ==
=== Theatre ===
| Year | Title | Role | Notes |
|---|---|---|---|
| 2004 | Journey's End | 2nd Lieutenant Raleigh | West End - Playhouse Theatre |
| 2004–2005 | Journey's End | 2nd Lieutenant Raleigh | West End - Duke of York's Theatre |
| 2006–2007 | The Letter | John Withers | West End - Wyndham's Theatre / Tour |
| 2008 | Jingo: A Farce of War | George | Off West End - Finborough Theatre |
| 2009 | The Apple Cart | Sempronius | Theatre Royal, Bath |
| 2009 | The Browning Version | Peter Gilbert | Theatre Royal, Bath / Tour |
| 2009 | A Daughter's a Daughter | Jerry Lloyd | West End - Trafalgar Studios |
| 2010 | Pygmalion | Freddy | Chichester Festival Theatre |
| 2010 | When We Are Married | Gerald Forbes | West End - Garrick Theatre |
| 2011 | Pygmalion | Freddy | West End - Garrick Theatre |
| 2011 | Notes For A Young Gentleman - In Response to Proverbs | Country Gent | Off West End - Bush Theatre |
| 2012 | Dandy Dick | Major Tarver | Theatre Royal, Brighton / Tour |
| 2013 | On Approval | George, Duke of Bristol | Off West End - Jermyn Street Theatre |
| 2014 | The Notorious Mrs Ebbsmith | Sir George / Sir Sandford | Off West End - Jermyn Street Theatre |
| 2014 | The Manual Oracle | Mike Lipkin / Ronald Millar | Off West End - The Yard Theatre |
| 2015 | Before the Party | David Marshall | Theatre Royal, Windsor / Tour |
| 2016 | Ross | Ronald Storrs | Chichester Festival Theatre |
| 2018 | The Importance of Being Earnest | Jack Worthing | Original Theatre Company Tour |
| 2022 | A Touch of Danger | Vincent Crane | Theatre Royal, Windsor |
| 2022 | Private Lives | Victor Prynne | Theatre Royal, Windsor |
| 2024 | The King's Speech | Bertie | Watermill Theatre |

=== Television ===
| Year | Title | Role | Episode(s) |
|---|---|---|---|
| 2006 | Foyles War | Mark Wilcox | Episode "Bad Blood" |
| 2007 | Torchwood | Tim Carstairs | Episode: "Captain Jack Harkness" |
| 2008 | Frankie Howerd: Rather You Than Me | Sheridan | TV movie |
| 2008 | Bonekickers | Silverman | Episode: "The Lines of War" |
| 2009 | Desperate Romantics | Edward "Ned" Burne-Jones | 2 episodes |
| 2012 | The Charles Dickens Show | Doctor Barnardo | Episode: "The Workhouse" |
| 2013 | Doctors | Lance Hendry | Episode: "Under Fire" |
| 2016 | Indian Summers | Captain Roberts | Episode: "Hide and Seek" |
| 2017 | The Crown | BBC Producer | Episode: "Marionettes" |
| 2018 | The Royals | Doctor | Episode: "Confess Yourself to Heaven" |
| 2019 | Britannia | Envoy 2 | Episode: "Alliance of Dark Forces" |
| 2020–2023 | Ghosts | Havers | 2 episodes |
| 2023 | Secret Invasion | London Banker | Episode: "Betrayed" |
| 2024 | Masters of the Air | British Officer #1 | Episode: "Part Six" |
| 2026 | Call the Midwife | Mr. Penwarden | Episode: #15.6 |
| 2026 | House of the Dragon | Lord Bywater | Episode: "Rhaenyra Triumphant" |

=== Film ===
| Year | Title | Role | Notes |
|---|---|---|---|
| 2012 | Notes from the Underground | Actor | |
| 2014 | The Red Line | Neal | Short film |
| 2022 | What's Love Got to Do with It? | Harry | |
| 2023 | Napoleon | British Lieutenant | |
| 2024 | Joy | John Webster | |
| 2025 | Downton Abbey: The Grand Finale | Estate Agent | |
| 2026 | Ghosts: The Possession of Button House | Havers | |

=== Writing Credits ===
| Year | Title | Notes |
|---|---|---|
| 2012 | The Charles Dickens Show | He is credited as writing 4 episodes |

=== Podcasts ===
| Year | Title | Platform | Link |
|---|---|---|---|
| 2023 | Inside… Ghosts | BBC Sounds | Inside… Ghosts - A Christmas gift |
| 2025 | Charity Q&A with Peter Sandys -Clarke | Youtube | Charity Q&A |
| 2025 | What do you do for a living? | Spotify | What do you do for a Living? |

=== Other ===
| Year | Title | Notes |
|---|---|---|
| 2006 | Please Please | Music video by McFly |
