= Yani Xander =

Bulgarian actor

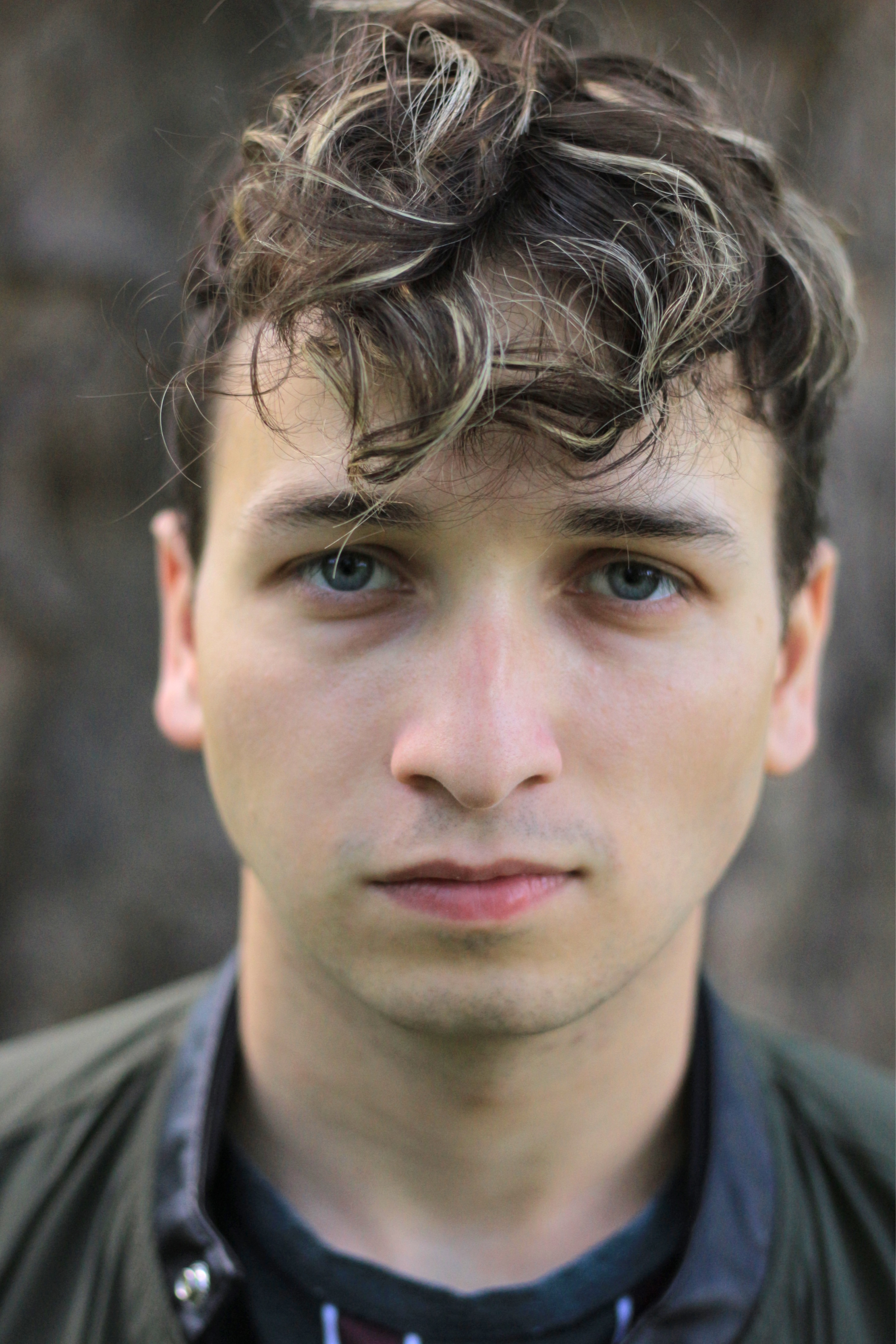
- Born: Yani Aleksandrov; Burgas, Bulgaria
- Occupation: Actor
- Years active: 2017–present

Yani Aleksandrov (born 16 January 1997), also known as Yani Xander, is a Bulgarian actor. He played the role of Humphrey Bone's Body in the BBC sitcom Ghosts.

== Early life ==
Yani Aleksandrov was born in Burgas, Bulgaria. In 2016, Xander moved to London to pursue a career in acting. He had his training at Anthony Meindl's Actors Workshop (AMAW) in London.

== Career ==
In 2017, Xander played a lead role in the short film Different League. He also featured in Amazon Prime's spy thriller series Alex Rider (2020–present) as Stepan Serenkov, son of the Russian oligarch. From 2019–2023, Xander played Humphrey Bone's Body in Ghosts, a BBC sitcom about a young couple who inherit a haunted estate.

== Filmography ==
=== Film ===
Year	Title	Role	Notes
2023	IRaH	Gavin	
2026	Ghosts: The Possession of Button House	Humphrey's Body	

=== Television ===
Year	Title	Role	Notes
2020	Alex Rider	Stepan Serenkov	
2019–2023	Ghosts	Humphrey Bone's Body	

=== Reality television ===
Year	Title	Role	Notes
2020	Love Squad	Self (Main contestant's friend)	Episode "Cosmina"
