= Ghosts: The Possession of Button House =

2026 British film

- Theatrical release poster
- Directed by: Simon Hynd
- Screenplay by: Mathew Baynton; Simon Farnaby; Martha Howe-Douglas; Jim Howick; Laurence Rickard; Ben Willbond
- Based on: Characters by Them There
- Produced by: Alison Owen; Debra Hayward; Alison Carpenter; Andy Brunskill
- Starring: Charlotte Ritchie; Kiell Smith-Bynoe; Lolly Adefope; Mathew Baynton; Simon Farnaby; Martha Howe-Douglas; Jim Howick; Laurence Rickard; Ben Willbond
- Music by: Sunna Wehrmeijer
- Production companies: BBC Film; Monumental Television
- Distributed by: Lionsgate
- Release date: 23 October 2026
- Running time: 97 minutes
- Country: United Kingdom
- Language: English
- Box office: $11.2million

Ghosts: The Possession of Button House is a British fantasy comedy film that serves as a continuation of the 2019–2023 British sitcom Ghosts. The film stars Charlotte Ritchie, Kiell Smith-Bynoe, Lolly Adefope, Mathew Baynton, Simon Farnaby, Martha Howe-Douglas, Jim Howick, Laurence Rickard, and Ben Willbond, reprising their roles from the series.

Ghosts: The Possession of Button House was released in the United Kingdom by Lionsgate on 23 October 2026.

== Plot ==
A few months after Alison and Mike moved away, the ghosts of Button House are adjusting to life without them, having become bored after the construction work on the planned golf course was abandoned due to outside issues. Their only source of excitement are postcards from Alison and Mike. The situation becomes further frustrated when protesters disrupt the construction of the planned hotel, leaving the ghosts wishing to find a way to contact Alison to get aid.

The opportunity arises when a group of teenagers come to Button House at night to perform a seance, as Sammy, one of the teens, has experience with ghosts because her grandmother was a medium. Based on Sammy's tales, Jack, one of the other teens, invites one of the ghosts to communicate through him, which allows Julian to possess Jack's body while forcing Jack's spirit out. The other ghosts and teens can only watch in confusion as Julian-in-Jack runs off, leaving Button House for the first time since his demise.

While Julian makes his way to Alison, Jack's spirit is revealed to have remained at Button House. While Pat and Kitty try to help him adjust to his new state, the Captain, Fanny and Robin spy on the protesters, with Robin becoming interested in one of them, a woman named Janine. Meanwhile, Sammy talks with her grandmother and learns that if the soul of a dead person inhabits a living body for too long, both souls could cease to exist, with Jack's spirit fading while Julian starts to experience headaches after making contact with Alison and Mike.

Alison and Mike set out to return Julian-in-Jack to Button House, but face complications when news reports identify Jack as missing, and an attempt to call Jack's foster parents on his phone leads to the assumption that he has been kidnapped. Back at Button House, the ghosts realise that Janine is a mole planning to burn down the house, working with local MP Richard Move as part of a wider plan. Alison, Mike and Julian are arrested at the gates, but Jack's friends return to the house, allowing the other ghosts (minus Humphrey) to borrow their bodies.

While Robin and the Captain investigate Move's office, Pat leads Thomas, Kitty and Fanny to the police station, Pat causing a distraction by stealing a police car while the others help Alison, Mike and Julian escape. The Captain and Robin discover that Move plans to burn down Button House to stop the planned hotel and then buy the land cheap to build an airfield instead, stealing his computer to expose his plan. The group all rendezvous back at Button House, where they manage to stop Janine burning down the building after Pat gently crashes into water-logged scaffolding, tipping the water on top down a pipe into the burning basement. As the police arrive, Robin is able to manipulate Move's phone to draw their attention to Move and Janine while the ghosts allow the teens to return to their bodies.

With Move's computer as evidence, and Jack's foster parents explaining their plans to permanently adopt him, the police dismiss all charges. Alison assures the ghosts that she still considers them family, and that plans for the hotel appear set to continue with a new focus on a park rather than a pure golf course. As the ghosts begin playing another game a new postcard arrives, this time from Jack and his friends.

== Cast ==
- Charlotte Ritchie as Alison Cooper
- Kiell Smith-Bynoe as Mike Cooper
- Lolly Adefope as Kitty Higham
- Mathew Baynton as Thomas Thorne
- Simon Farnaby as Julian Fawcett
- Martha Howe-Douglas as Lady Fanny Button
- Jim Howick as Pat Butcher
- Laurence Rickard as Robin/Humphrey Bone
  - Yani Xander as Humphrey's Body
- Ben Willbond as The Captain
- Scott Ellis Watson as Jack Marsh
- Sian Clifford as Janine
- Joe Wilkinson as Train Ghost
- Rufus Jones as Richard Move, MP
- John-Luke Roberts as Danno
- Geoffrey McGivern as Barclay
- Cathy Tyson as Sammy's Gran
- Emily Lloyd-Saini as D.I. Quinn
- Gurjeet Singh as P.C. Coulter
- Amy Gledhill as D.C. Weaver
- Ella Kenion as D.S. Franklin

== Production ==
The film is written by Mathew Baynton, Simon Farnaby, Martha Howe-Douglas, Jim Howick, Laurence Rickard and Ben Willbond with all six appearing in the film alongside Charlotte Ritchie, Kiell Smith-Bynoe and Lolly Adefope, with all reprising their roles from the British television series. It is directed by Simon Hynd and produced by Alison Carpenter and Andy Brunskill for Monumental Television and BBC Film. Having initially declined opportunities to continue with the characters, Baynton told The Guardian that they "had stopped the series with genuinely no intention of coming back". The film developed quickly once Carpenter convinced the troupe to reconsider, with Hynd learning of the burgeoning project in late-2025.

The cast also includes Scott Ellis Watson, Sian Clifford and Rufus Jones as well as British comedians Amy Gledhill, John-Luke Roberts and Joe Wilkinson.

Principal photography began in March 2026 with filming taking place at West Horsley Place in Surrey.

== Release ==
The film was released by Lionsgate in the UK and Ireland on 23 October 2026.

== Reception ==
The Guardian said that the feature-length format may have "freed up the writers to unleash new levels of giddiness with added spoonfuls of silliness" while simultaneously being "every bit as warm and comforting as on TV".

In Empire, the film was described as being "neatly plotted" with "non-stop chuckles".

Time Out praised the performance of Watson as a new addition to the cast, and said that the film "faithfully imbibes the original series' alcohol-free cocktail of cosy-comedy charm, cheeky edginess, political/social commentary, winking risqué-ness and light-touch sentimentality" while combining it with an "Ealing-esque kinda-crime caper with added body-swap shenanigans".

On the weekend of its release, the film was the No. 1 at the box office in the UK and Ireland, with receipts of £2.4 million in its first three days.
