= John's Not Mad =

1989 British television documentary

- Directed by: Valerie Kaye
- Presented by: Eleanor Bron (narrator)
- Country of origin: United Kingdom

Production
- Running time: 30 minutes

Original release
- Network: BBC1
- Release: 15 March 1989

John's Not Mad is a British television documentary made as an episode of the BBC's Q.E.D. series in 1989. In 2005, it was ranked, in a British public poll, as one of the 50 Greatest Documentaries.

== Overview ==
The film shadows John Davidson, a 15-year-old from Galashiels in Scotland, who has severe Tourette syndrome. John's life was explored in terms of his family and the close-knit community around him, and how they all coped with a misunderstood condition. Oliver Sacks, a neurologist, offers observations on aspects of John's behaviour. The documentary was narrated by the actress Eleanor Bron.

A follow-up documentary, The Boy Can't Help It, was aired by the BBC in 2002, catching up with Davidson, aged 30, to see how he continued to cope with the condition. It also visits an 8 year old named Greg Storey, from Yorkshire who also has Tourette's, and offers his experience of it at an early age.

== DVD release ==
Both John's Not Mad and an edited version of The Boy Can't Help It omitting the scenes dealing with Greg Storey were released on DVD in 2006 with the proceeds going to the Tourette Scotland foundation.

The documentary achieved a cult status soon after it was first aired. The website DVD Times later commented that despite the "possible good intentions of the film crew, it has been seen as some sort of comedy classic."

John Davidson also featured with Keith Allen in a Channel 4 documentary entitled Tourette De France where he travelled with Allen and a group of Scottish people with Tourette's to Paris to visit the hospital where Georges Gilles de la Tourette practised.

== Twentieth anniversary ==
In May 2009, BBC television broadcast Tourettes: I Swear I Can't Help It, a follow-up to the 1989 and 2002 documentaries, that caught up with both John (at 37) and a 15-year-old Greg, to see how their lives had changed in seven years.
