= The Grey Lady =

(The) Grey Lady or (The) Gray Lady may refer to:

== Films ==
- The Grey Lady (film), 1937 German film also known as Sherlock Holmes: The Grey Lady
- Grey Lady (film), 2017 American film directed by John Shea

== Folklore ==
- Grey Lady, a ghost reputed to haunt Rufford Old Hall, Lancashire, England
- Grey Lady, a ghost reputed to haunt Theatre Royal, Bath, England
- Grey Lady, a ghost reputed to haunt Fort St. Angelo, Birgu, Malta
- The Grey Lady, a spirit reputed to haunt Cumberland College, in Dunedin, New Zealand
- The Gray Lady Ghost, reputed to haunt the old parsonage in Sims, North Dakota, United States
- The Grey Lady, a ghost reputed to haunt the Dark Hedges, County Antrim, Northern Ireland
- The Grey Lady, a ghost reputed to haunt Gainsborough Old Hall, Lincolnshire, England
- The Grey Lady, a ghost reputed to haunt Willard Library, Indiana, United States

== Entertainment ==
- The Gray Lady, a spirit from Ghostbusters
- The Grey Lady, a character in The Good Witch
- The Grey Lady, a character in Harry Potter; see Hogwarts staff

== Other uses ==
- MV Grey Lady, American catamaran ferry
- A member of the Gray Ladies, volunteers working with the American Red Cross in WWII
- The Gray Lady, a nickname for The New York Times

== See also ==
- The Old Grey Lady, a nickname for Legion Field in Birmingham, Alabama, US
- The Little Grey Lady of the Sea, a nickname for Nantucket Island, Massachusetts, US
