= Willward Alexander Sandys-Clarke =

Recipient of the Victoria Cross

- Born: 8 June 1919; Southport, Lancashire, England
- Died: 23 April 1943 (aged 23); Guiriat El Atach, French Tunisia
- Burial place: Massicault War Cemetery
- Relatives: Peter Sandys-Clarke (grandson)
- Military career
- Allegiance: United Kingdom
- Branch: British Army
- Service years: 1941–1943
- Rank: Lieutenant
- Service number: 86517
- Units: Loyal Regiment (North Lancashire)
- Conflicts: World War II †
- Awards: Victoria Cross

Lieutenant Willward Alexander Sandys-Clarke VC (8 June 1919 – 23 April 1943) was a British Army officer and an English recipient of the Victoria Cross, the highest and most prestigious award for gallantry in the face of the enemy that can be awarded to British and Commonwealth forces.

== Background ==
He was born in Southport, and was educated at Uppingham School. He married Dorothy Irene Deakin at the present-day United Reformed Church in Belmont, Lancashire in 1941, and they lived in Egerton, near Bolton.

== Details ==
Sandys-Clarke was a 23-year-old lieutenant in the 1st Battalion, Loyal Regiment (North Lancashire), British Army during the Second World War when he was awarded the VC.

On 23 April 1943 at Guiriat El Atach, Tunisia, Lieutenant Clarke's company was counter-attacked and almost wiped out, he being the sole remaining officer. Although wounded in the head, he gathered a composite platoon together and advancing to attack the position again met heavy fire from a machine-gun post. He manoeuvred his men to give covering fire and then tackled the post single-handed, killing or capturing the crew and knocking out the gun. He dealt similarly with two other posts and then led his platoon to the objective, but was killed when he later went forward to tackle two sniper posts single-handed.

== Further information ==
Sandys-Clarke was related to four other recipients of the award:

- Gen. Walter Congreve (Colenso)
- Frederick Roberts, 1st Earl Roberts (Khudaganj)
- Lt. Frederick Roberts (Colenso)
- Maj. William Congreve (Somme)

The medal was retained by his family and was not on public display. However, on 6 July 2025, the Daily Telegraph reported that the medal had been put up for auction at Spink & Son with an estimate of £300,000 to £500,000. https://spink.com/lot/25002000167

== Bibliography ==
- John, Laffin (1997). British VCs of World War 2: A Study in Heroism. Sutton Publishing. ISBN 0-7509-1026-7.
