= Plague pit =

Mass graves of Black Death victims

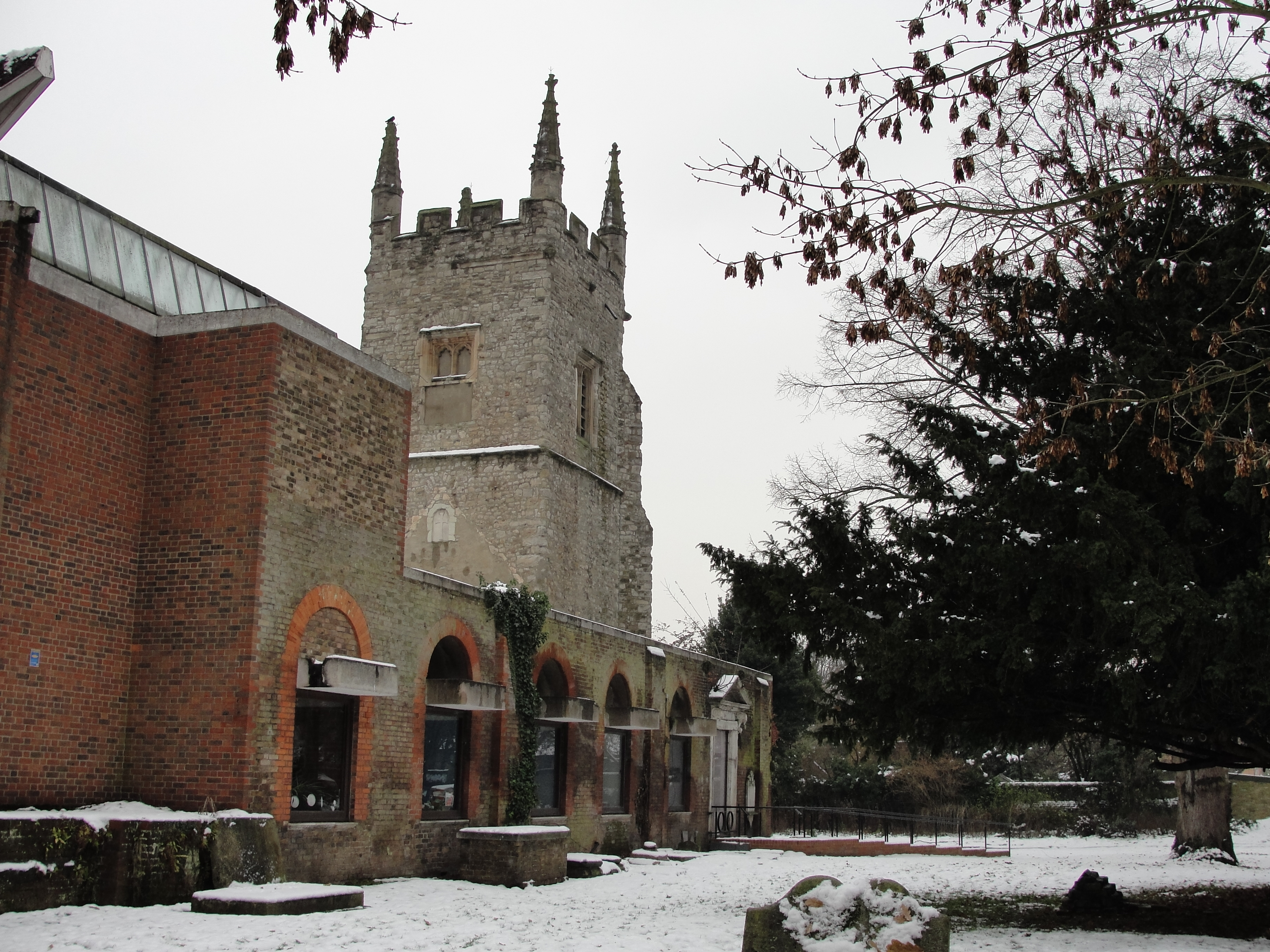
149 victims of the Great Plague were buried at All Saints' Churchyard at Isleworth in 1665

A plague pit is the informal term used to refer to mass graves in which victims of the Black Death were buried. The term is most often used to describe pits located in Great Britain, but can be applied to any place where bubonic plague victims were buried.

== Origin ==
The plague which swept across China, the Middle East, and Europe in the 14th century is estimated to have killed between one-third and two-thirds of Europe's population. Disposal of the bodies of those who died presented huge problems for the authorities, and eventually the normal patterns of burial and funerary observance broke down.

== Major plague outbreaks ==
Plague pits were used especially often during major plague outbreaks, such as the London epidemic of 1665. With between 15% of London's population died between 1665 and 1666. Graveyards rapidly filled and parishes became strained; for example the number of deaths in the parish of St Bride's Church, Fleet Street, in 1665 was almost six times the average.
