= Q.E.D. (British TV series) =

Strand of science documentary films

- Title card
- Country of origin: United Kingdom
- Original language: English

Production
- Executive producers: Mick Rhodes (1982–84); David Filkin (1985–91); Simon Campbell-Jones (1992); Susan Spindler (1993–94); Tim Haines (1994); Lorraine Heggessey (1995–97); Michael Mosley (1998–99)
- Producers: Alec Nisbett; Liz Tucker; Emma Walker; John Hayes-Fisher; Andrew Thompson
- Running time: 30 min
- Production company: BBC Television

Original release
- Network: BBC1
- Release: 1982 – 1999

Q.E.D. (quod erat demonstrandum, Latin for "that which was to be demonstrated") was the name of a series of BBC popular science documentary films which aired in the United Kingdom from 1982 to 1999.

== Format ==
Running in a half-hour peak-time slot on the BBC's primary mass-audience channel BBC1, the series had a more populist and general interest agenda than the long-running Horizon series which aired on the more specialist channel BBC2.

Horizon could often be difficult for a scientific novice, requiring a modicum of background knowledge beyond the reaches of many viewers, so Q.E.D. was a more approachable way of introducing scientific stories.

== Some notable films ==
- A Guide to Armageddon (1982) – the effects of a one megaton nuclear bomb being exploded over London. Director Mick Jackson went on to direct the 1984 docu-drama Threads, an account of a nuclear holocaust and its effect on the city of Sheffield, England, and the eventual long-term effects of nuclear war on civilization.
- Simon's War (1983) – the life of Simon Weston, who suffered serious burns in the Falklands War.
- Big Brother's Little Test (1983) – how reliable is polygraphy, the use of lie-detectors? Can the innocent be unjustly condemned? Can the guilty beat them?
- In at the Deep End (1984) – an experiment in which divers spent nine days at simulated depths of up to 1000 feet, breathing a mixture of hydrogen and oxygen.
- Round Britain Whizz (1986) – a sped-up flight around the coastline of Britain, with guest appearances of Patrick Moore, David Bellamy and Clay Jones.
- The Foolish Wise Ones (1987) – a look at the talents and worlds of Autistic Savants, such as Stephen Wiltshire.
- With a Goal in Mind (1988) – a sport psychologist works with First Division Queen's Park Rangers for a period of six weeks.
- The Magic of Memory (1988) – fronted by the TV magician Paul Daniels, who among other things uses the Linkword system to master enough Spanish to present the second part of the programme in the language.
- Glimpses of Death (1988) – Prof. Peter Fenwick takes a look (at that time still very pioneering) at the phenomenon of near-death experiences.
- John's Not Mad (1989) – follows a 15-year-old boy with severe Tourette syndrome.
- My Best Friend's a Computer (1990) – explores the effects of computers on the emotional development of children.
- How to be Happy (1996) – about the science and psychology of happiness, presented by Robert Holden.
- Nerve Transplant (1997) – explores the work of a unique nerve transplant surgeon, bringing back movement to the limbs of previously paralysed patients.
- Superspecs (1997) – follows the travels of a British inventor around Ghana with a pair of glasses made for just a dollar, that he is convinced could save the sight of millions.
- The Burning Question (1998) – on spontaneous human combustion.
- Breathless (1998) – investigates the Buteyko method for treating asthma.

== See also ==
- Equinox – Channel 4 popular science series, last aired in 2001
- Horizon – comparable BBC2 strand, on air since 1964
- Nova – documentary series on PBS in the United States, which often bought in and re-voiced Equinox and Horizon films
