= List of Horrible Histories (2015 TV series) episodes =

Episodes of the revived British children's sketch comedy television series

The following is a list of Horrible Histories episodes from Series 6 onwards, based on the book series of the same name.

== Series overview ==
Series	Episodes	Originally released	
Series	Episodes	First released	Last released
6	15	7 February 2015	24 August 2015
The Specials II	3	19 April 2016	5 September 2016
7	15	15 June 2017	7 May 2018
8	15	3 June 2019	3 August 2020
9	15	7 May 2021	15 October 2022
10	15	16 June 2023	14 June 2024
Special		8 September 2023	
11	15	7 February 2025	19 December 2025

== Episodes ==
=== Series 6 (2015) ===
This was the first series to dedicate each episode to a special subject or theme. Series 6 took a look at some of history's most Rotten Rulers, a selection played by guest stars. The series began with King John for the day of Magna Carta's 800th anniversary.

No.	Title	Written by	Original release date
601	"Crooked King John and Magna Carta"	Ben Ward, Lucy Clarke, Dave Cohen, Gerard Foster, Benjamin Partridge, Daniel Peak, Steve Punt, George Sawyer, Daniel Maier	7 February 2015
Starring Ben Miller as King John Song: "And I Would Say 800 Years" (parody of "I'm Gonna Be (500 Miles)" by The Proclaimers); Sketches: "King John: The Story So Far" - Quarrelling with his brother and being a joke to his family doesn't leave John with a very good name. HHTV News: Reporting live from the bizarre coronation of topless King John, who struggles to keep his crown on! King John's X-Treme Survival: Trees, moss, leaves, and rivers are not needed when you have servants carrying around a bed! Saladin explains his cunningly cruel plan for the Crusades... eventually! "History's Craziest Fools": Renauld de Châtillon - Mr. H introduces one mean medieval man (parody of World's Craziest Fools). Historical Restrooms: A businessman uses a Medieval toilet, only to be accompanied by desperate peasants with desperate measures. "Battle of the Day": The mean Mongol, Genghis Khan, storms over the world with many gruesome victories, but in the studio Geoff and Jamie try to look at the positive impact he had on the Earth (parody of Match of the Day). "The Real Plantagenet Hustle": John "Lackland" shows off his best cons to get money and land off his people who can't refuse! (parody of The Real Hustle); A rap battle commences at Runnymede when the Barons tell King John to sign Magna Carta (parody of Epic Rap Battles of History). "Chatty Death": Death displeases King John with the progress of Magna Carta his brother's fame today (parody of Alan Carr: Chatty Man and The Graham Norton Show).
602	"Awesome Alfred the Great"	James Bugg, Dave Cohen, Gerrard Foster, Benjamin Partridge, Daniel Peak, Steve Punt, Howard Read, George Sawyer, Ben Ward, Daniel Maier	25 May 2015
Starring Tom Rosenthal as Alfred the Great Song: "I'm Out of Town" (parody of "Lego House" by Ed Sheeran); Sketches: A preview for the series "The Saxons": It is only a matter of time before the weakest, youngest man of the family finds himself heir to the throne (parody of The Hills, The Kardashians and Made In Chelsea). Aethelred and Alfred are up against the Vikings at the Battle of Ashdown, 871 AD, and Aethelred does his best to keep the Vikings away... by praying! One local businesswoman gets herself in trouble after some confusion with the new Viking form of insult: sarcasm. "I'm a Tang Celebrity": Empress Wu Zetian easily passes the Bushtucker trial, with many of her national food favourites on the menu (parody of I'm a Celebrity...Get Me Out of Here!). "Who Do I Wish I Was?": Welsh monk Asser helps King Alfred discover his family tree, or at least what he would like his family tree to look like (parody of Who Do You think You Are?). Historical Shopping Channel: King Alfred advertises some of his not-so-great inventions, which aren't for killing Vikings. Kings we get from the Saxon era: Some of the many Saxon Kings from around the world and their rather odd names. Horrible Histories Health Direct: Some Saxon and Egyptian advice on stomach troubles are given, as well as the popular Aztec cure of chocolate. "History's Craziest Fools": Pope Stephen VI - One crazy Pope takes former-Pope Formosus to court, despite the condition he is in, and claims he can see "right through" his case! England's great schools, army, villages and many other great things are not quite the talk of Europe, as King Alfred discovers it is in fact much more personal! "Chatty Death": Although he is pleased about his great title, Alfred is not impressed that of all his work, he is remembered for the story of him and the cakes!
603	"Wicked William the Conqueror"	Dave Cohen, Howard Davidson, Justin Edwards, Benjamin Partridge, Daniel Peak, Howard Read, George Sawyer, Joe Tucker, Raphael Warner, Ben Ward, Daniel Maier	1 June 2015
Starring Kevin Eldon as William the Conqueror Song: "Norman Style" (parody of "Gangnam Style" by Psy); Sketches: A preview for the series "The Normans": After King Edward promises the throne to both of his sons, Harold and William, things aren't made very easy! Despite being rivals to the throne, William and Harold hang out together as brothers, despite Harold being forced to swear an oath. Historical Desktops: William organizes his invasion via tablet after learning things hadn't gone to plan and Harold is King of England. "History's Craziest Fools": William the Conqueror - Wicked William makes his first mistake when landing in England. "Battle of the Day": The Battle of Hastings - The most famous battle in history kicks off as the Saxons fight the Normans in Hastings, 1066. "Let's Blow Stuff Up!": Some of the many explosive things made by the Ancient Chinese get blown up! Amazing Scientists: The man who is seen as the world's first true scientist, Ibn al-Haytham, explains some of his great ideas and why he must act crazily. "Let's Talk About Art": The Bayeux Tapestry - Brian Gruel goes to see the making of the tapestry - or rather embroidery - and soon learns the truth behind the masterpiece. "The Great Saxon Bake Off": One Saxon peasant serves up the only thing she can when the harvest isn't ready - rye bread, with added madness as a side-effect (parody of The Great British Bake Off). William's servants' attempts to loot him after his death turn into a game of statues. "Chatty Death": Death displeases William with the details of his gory funeral.
604	"Mardy Mary Queen of Scots"	Lucy Clarke, Dave Cohen, Justin Edwards, Gerard Foster, Benjamin Partridge, Daniel Peak, George Sawyer, Ben Ward, Daniel Maier	8 June 2015
Starring Jessica Ransom as Mary, Queen of Scots Song: "Queenian Rhapsody" (parody of "Bohemian Rhapsody" by Queen); Sketches: A preview for "Mary Queen of Scots": The story so far of Mary, crowned as a baby and forced to flee to France, marrying Francis and becoming Queen. The five Marys live happily in France until the news of Francis's death reaches them. Tudor gentlemen soon learn the "rough" side to wearing large ruffs. "The Great Tudor Bake Off": Gilbert and Percy cook up some Tudor bread, which proves to take some time. Historical Desktops: Mary announces on a dating site via computer about her return whilst looking for a husband. Tudor Togs: Dress up as your favourite queen; will you choose young and pretty Mary, or will you choose her rival, old and ugly Elizabeth? Bear in mind it's illegal to dress up as a monarch in the 16th century. Historical Desktops: Mary looks for another husband via smartphone, and explains what happened to her previous husbands. Historical Restrooms: When one businessman looks for a toilet, he meets Mr. John Harington, who introduces him to the world's first flushing toilet, which is still in need of a few minor improvements - and perhaps some toilet paper! Amazing Scientists: Brian meets Tycho Brahe from the Tudor era, who amazes him with Tudor science... and his apparent pet elf! Historical Desktops: Mary again looks for another royal husband via tablet to help in her future conquest of England. "History's Craziest Fools": Mr. H takes a look at the Battle of Lepanto, 1571, where the Ottomans start a dance-off, and fire fruit! "Chatty Death": Mary compares her life with Elizabeth I, and it seems that Mary's enemy was better off than she was!
605	"Naughty Napoleon"	Dave Cohen, Justin Edwards, Gerard Foster, Benjamin Partridge, George Sawyer, Ben Ward, Daniel Maier	15 June 2015
Starring Jim Howick as Napoleon Song: "Napoleon Bonaparte" (parody of Skrillex and David Guetta); Sketches: Napoleon waits patiently to get into the French Army, whilst the French revolution happens, executing the monarchs as well as French soldiers for being disloyal. Napoleon returns to meet his beloved Josephine, who soon gets annoyed at Napoleon's behaviour. Sake Dean Mahomet presents his brand new hair cleaning device, "shampoo". Edward Jenner advertises his new solution to smallpox, which proves effective compared to the old method. "Battle of the Day": Watch Napoleon's slow conquest of Europe, as even his losses are wins as far as France knows! The Duke of Wellington learns that Napoleon was not destroyed as he had thought, and thus it's time for battle! Waterloo Fest 1815: The French decide to wait for the ground to dry up, meanwhile the British decide to have a party before fighting! As for the Prussians, their leader, General Blucher, thinks he is pregnant with an elephant (parody of Glastonbury Festival) "Historical Countryfile": Exiled to Another edition - Napoleon's last exile on St. Helena is where he decides to take a spot of gardening. Peaceful? Not a chance! (parody of Countryfile). Chatty Death: Napoleon talks about his rise and fall, whilst Death winds him up about his temper and height.
606	"Horrid Henry VIII"	Lucy Clarke, Dave Cohen, Chris Chantler, Justin Edwards, Gerard Foster, Greg Jenner, Benjamin Partridge, Steve Punt, George Sawyer, Howard Read, Daniel Maier	22 June 2015
Starring Rowan Atkinson as Henry VIII Song: "A Little More Reformation" (parody of "A Little Less Conversation" by Elvis Presley); Sketches: A preview for "Dull Dad": Henry must learn there's more to being a King than fighting, but his dad tells him otherwise, leaving a very bored Henry. HHTV Sport: Henry VIII shows what he can do in sport, before getting ready for the incredibly (not) thrilling wood-sawing contest. Henry returns from France with a small victory, only to find his wife, Catherine of Aragon, has defeated his no. 1 enemy, the Scots, and his guard doesn't help brighten his outshined mood. "History's Craziest Fools": Zhengde Emperor - The crazy Chinese emperor almost gets killed in an explosion, torn to pieces by a tiger and drowned - all of which are his fault - yet he suffers a far more ironic death. "An Evening with Cardinal Wolsey": Wolsey reveals the two secrets to his success, but is soon disturbed when Henry's lady-in-waiting gets sick of waiting for a divorce - chop-chop, Wolsey! (parody of An Evening with...). Suleiman the Magnificent sets his children an unusual task to succeed him, which doesn't fill them with joy. "My Big Fat Tudor Wedding": Cromwell convinces Henry to marry Anne of Cleves, but the couple soon regrets it after marriage - and so does Cromwell! (parody of My Big Fat Gypsy Wedding). Historical Clinic: A Tudor doctor's idea of treating the lurgy on a modern patient turns out less than comforting. "Chatty Death": Henry talks about his reign, and his young athletic years, only to be disgusted when the talk of his food and wives is made primary conversation!
607	"Crafty Cleopatra"	Lucy Clarke, Dave Cohen, Toby Davies, Benjamin Partridge, Daniel Peak, George Sawyer, Howard Read, Daniel Maier	29 June 2015
Starring Kathryn Drysdale as Cleopatra Song: "I Can't Go On" (parody of "You Lost Me" by Christina Aguilera); Sketches: A preview for "The Egyptians": Cleopatra marries her dad until he dies, and then her annoying little brother. "History's Craziest Fools": Ptolemy XIII - Some brothers hate their sisters, but Ptolemy hates his sister Cleo so much he declares civil war on her! "Historical Mastermind": Clever Cleo takes on the "Everything" category. Caesar seems unable to get a grip on the floors of Cleo's palace as he brings her great news. "Egyptian One Born Every Minute": Cleopatra gives birth, with strange Egyptian and Roman customs (parody of One Born Every Minute). A preview for the DVD "Confucius: Confuciusly Confusing!" - Confucius has some strange sayings which are even more popular with a few funnier changes! "What Cleo Did Next": Cleo's marriage with Caesar continues, until he drops dead - soon to be replaced by Mark Anthony (parody of What Katie Did Next). One man goes collecting wee, and soon finds out why not to collect it in the slums! Two Brits barter with a cow-based money system. Octavian eventually convinces his men they must go to war against Mark Antony by telling them he started wearing makeup. "Chatty Death": Cleo talks about her clever, ravishing legacy - as well as the deaths she experienced.
608	"Gorgeous George III"	Lucy Clarke, Dave Cohen, Justin Edwards, Gerard Foster, Barunka O'Shaughnessy, Benjamin Partridge, Steve Punt, George Sawyer, Daniel Maier	6 July 2015
Starring Simon Farnaby as George III Song: "Courtlife" (parody of "Parklife" by Blur); Sketches: Young George believes he's more popular than ever, but his poor servant gets the brunt of the attempts on the King's life. A promotion for Clara the Rhino on tour has the world thrilled with this new species. George bores his family to insanity with his talk of potatoes, clocks, and buttons, leaving some rather marrying a stranger! Words we get from India: Along with cotton, tea, and spices, we also get many words from India which are taught through the actions of one mugger. "Battle of the Day": Patriots vs Loyalists - The Americans are revolting against the English, wanting their land back to themselves, but with an army of farmers and help from the French, can they take control? Dinner etiquette with George is determined by his guests' role of importance - but they'd better be quick! Historical Clinic: A Georgian doctor's idea of curing acne isn't good as it sounds (and it doesn't sound very good either!). "Historical Countryfile": George tends to the royal farm, explaining about the Prussian ambassador (or rather a tree), and lets loose his identity as Ralph Robinson trying to explain clock rotation to the newspapers. Flea-infested William the Macaroni and the slowly prepared Charles the dandy battle it out on "Historical Catwalk's" Georgian Men Final (parody of Project Catwalk). HHTV News: The Prince Regent's undermining of the throne seems to be not as exciting as watching the King jump around being a kangaroo. "Chatty Death": George III talks to the similar-looking Death about his long reign, disappointed by his remaining image as being mad.
609	"Bolshy Boudica"	Beth Chalmers, Dave Cohen, Justin Edwards, Benjamin Partridge, George Sawyer, Amy Shindler, Ben Ward, Daniel Maier	13 July 2015
Starring Lorna Watson as Boudica; Song: "Wreck 'Em All" (parody of "Wrecking Ball" by Miley Cyrus); Sketches: Ave! Magazine: Fit Brit Celtic Boudica lives the luxurious Roman life. "History's Craziest Fools": Emperor Caligula - Cruel Caligula threatens to kill his guests when they don't clap loudly at a play, or when he's joking - which is difficult to tell when! Boudica's loss of her husband has unexpected consequences when Boudica turns against her loved Roman lifestyle. A Roman family moves next door to a Celtic family, and they don't quite appreciate each other's traditions! "Historical Grand Designs: Grand Destructions Edition" shows Boudica's plan to bash the Romans, starting with knocking down Colchester and setting it alight! (parody of Grand Designs). Historical Desktops: Using his tablet, Emperor Nero doesn't seem bothered at first by Boudica, but when you dislike his Boo-Tube videos, you're history! Historical Clinic: Cough medicine is out of the question for a Celtic druid - eating mice and bathing in an ox's blood is much more realistic. "Battle of the Day": Boudica vs. Romans - The Rotten Romans, outnumbered, fight the Cut-Throat Celts, in-closed! A gory battle, where Chris Staycalmer reports, whilst in the studio the death of the dogs is remiss. "Chatty Death": Boudica talks about her struggle against the Romans whilst Death learns how funny his skeleton friends can be.: Trivia: This episode was partly reworked into the film Horrible Histories: The Movie – Rotten Romans
610	"Wily Winston Churchill"	Beth Chalmers, Chris Chantler, Dave Cohen, Toby Davies, Justin Edwards, Gerard Foster, Barunka O'Shaughnessy, Benjamin Partridge, Howard Read, George Sawyer, Amy Shindler, Ben Ward, Daniel Maier	20 July 2015
Starring Jim Howick as Winston Churchill Song: "Your Finest Hour" (parody of "My Way" by Frank Sinatra); Sketches: Churchill advertises for his "Diary of a Winston Kid" book, telling us about his exciting adventures in India and Africa (parody of Diary of a Wimpy Kid). "Historical Grand Designs": Churchill doesn't count the cost of designing his home, which doesn't please his wife, nor does his gorilla impression! Adrian Carton de Wiart's injuries over many wars make painting a portrait of him difficult. "Historical Voice": Winston convinces the judges he has the voice, with his famous speeches broadcast via radio (parody of The Voice UK). "The Great WWII Bake Off": When supplies are short for British folk, there is always one rabbit-like solution. Historical Restrooms: A businessman is drafted into the war toilets and finds out what Americans did to their toilet paper in the war. "History's Craziest Fools": Churchill and Joseph Stalin have some strange places to go to the toilet, and Mahatma Gandhi has a strange use for two people. Working at 10 Downing Street under Churchill isn't as easy as it sounds. "Historical Gogglebox": Tellybox edition shows that Churchill doesn't quite keep up to date with all the modern rage (parody of Gogglebox). "Chatty Death": Winston Churchill talks about all the hard work he did for the war effort and is pleased with how he is remembered.
611	"Tricky Queen Vicky"	Lucy Clarke, Dave Cohen, Justin Edwards, Greg Jenner, Benjamin Partridge, Howard Read, George Sawyer, Ben Ward, Daniel Maier	27 July 2015
Starring Sarah Hadland as Queen Victoria Song: "Empress of India" (parody of Bollywood films); Sketches: The young Queen Vicky's "inspirational" speech unexpectedly turns into a teenage temper tantrum. Then Magazine: Queen Vicky's marriage to Albert isn't the most romantic love story, what with Vicky's unfinished portrait and Albert fainting. Vicky's Palace Secrets: Vicky shows us her palace and how pleasant it is to live there, with rats, cold draughts, and thieving boys! Queen Vicky's art collection proves more than Albert can handle with naked necks and knees on display! Historical Clinic: A Victorian surgeon's idea of sanitation is not so sanitary. "Historical Grand Designs": Breaking up India with a massive hedge sounds like an interesting plan, but the reality isn't that great. "History's Craziest Fools": Ned Kelly - The Australian outlaw was definitely crazy but also had some nifty ideas! One hopeless doctor attempts to stop the women he often proposes marriage to from riding away on a bicycle with some odd ideas in his book about bicycles and women. "Chatty Death": Queen Vicky talks about her record-breaking reign and her mournful later life.
612	"'Orrible Oliver Cromwell"	Dave Cohen, Greg Jenner, Benjamin Partridge, Daniel Peak, George Sawyer, Ben Ward, Daniel Maier	3 August 2015
Starring Lawry Lewin as Oliver Cromwell Song: "The Cruel Necessities" (parody of "The Bare Necessities" from The Jungle Book); Sketches: Oyez Magazine: Cromwell isn't as impressive in Parliament as he was thought to be. "History's Craziest Fools": Charles I - The foolish King was given the option to make peace with the man who ended up responsible for his own death, and just left him more questions from his question! Chaos! The Civil War board game: Play rounds and rounds of the Civil War, acting out every confusing step of the Roundheads, Cavaliers, Scots, Irish - the list goes on! (parody of Risk). A new general calls out a register of weird names in the Roundhead army (animated). A preview for the film "Full Metal Helmet" is soon ceased with some misunderstanding of the real Civil War hero, Sir Thomas Fairfax (parody of Full Metal Jacket). Water Beware!: The dangers of drinking water and washing in it in the Stuart era... which can lead to other dangers! Cromwell denies the right to be king outright, despite much royal treatment and symbolism. Cromwell's Britain: The things Cromwell banned during his time as leader don't please one young girl, NoMerit Vynall, who just wants to have some fun. "Chatty Death": Death awkwardly tells "Crommus" about the Restoration and the ever-popular monarchy, leaving him pretty speechless...
613	"Rotten Rulers"	Lucy Clarke, Dave Cohen, Justin Edwards, Gerard Foster, Greg Jenner, George Sawyer, Ben Ward, Daniel Maier	10 August 2015
Rattus Rattus hosts a compilation of previous sketches from Series 6 as he attempts to become ruler of his rat's nest. Sketches; The Barons and King John have a rap battle at Runnymede. Caesar seems unable to get a grip on the floors of Cleo's palace. Josephine gets annoyed to no end by Napoleon's behaviour. Alfred tries not to let his problems with his sore bottom be mocked. The five Marys go about their business until they learn of Francis's death. "History's Craziest Fools": William the Conqueror. "My Big Fat Tudor Wedding" shows the start of Henry's short marriage to Anne of Cleves. "Your Finest Hour" (music video, from S06E10).
614	"It's a Wicked World"	Dave Cohen, Gerard Foster, Greg Jenner, Steve Punt, George Sawyer, Ben Ward, Daniel Maier	17 August 2015
Rattus Rattus hosts a compilation of previous sketches from Series 6 as he goes on a historical world tour. Sketches "Napoleon Boneparte". Saladin explains his plan to block the Christians' access to a well during The Crusades. "Battle of the Day": Genghis Khan. "Historical Catwalk": Medieval Women Final (previously unreleased). A preview for the DVD "Confucius: Confuciusly Confusing" - The actual teachings of the Chinese philosopher aren't too well known! (slightly different version) "I'm a Tang Celebrity": Empress Wu. Words we get from India. "History's Craziest Fools": Battle of Lepanto. Historical Restrooms: A businessman uses a Medieval toilet. "Empress of India" (music video, from S06E11).
615	"Savage Songs"	Ben Ward, Dave Cohen, Greg Jenner, George Sawyer	24 August 2015
Savage Songs: Rattus Rattus hosts a compilation of songs from Series 6 as he tries to become a music megastar. "A Little More Reformation" (from S06E06), "I'm Out of Town" (from S06E02), "Wreck 'Em All" (from S06E09), "Norman Style" (from S06E03), "Queenian Rhapsody" (from S06E04), "And I Would Say 800 Years" (from S06E01), "I Can't Go On" (from S06E07).

=== The Specials II (2016) ===
In 2016 three special episodes were produced and shown throughout the year, each marking a historical milestone. This included 400 years since Shakespeare's death and 350 years since the Great Fire of London, as well as a special for the BBC's 'Love to Read' campaign.

Title	Written by	Original air date
"Sensational Shakespeare"	Lucy Clarke, Dave Cohen, Toby Davies, Gerard Foster, Danny Peak, Steve Punt, George Sawyer, Joe Tucker, Raphael Warner, Ben Ward, Daniel Maier	19 April 2016
Starring Tom Stourton as William Shakespeare; A special episode marking the 400th anniversary of Shakespeare's death. Songs: "Writers in the House!" "The Plays What I've Written" (parody of "It's the End of the World as We Know It (And I Feel Fine)" by R.E.M). Sketches: Oh Yea! Magazine: A look at Shakespeare's unknown early life, glove-making father, and loyal wife prove to be quite boring! Considering a change from actor to writer, Shakespeare attempts to get some advice from some of the writers down at the pub, only to be mocked. H! Entertainment: A look at the top three forms of entertainment in the Tudor era leave Shakespeare's plays just beaten by "Jackanapes" (parody of E! News). A young Tudor man seeks a job as an actor in one of Shakespeare's plays, but learns that he has to start at the bottom... literally! A young Tudor man, Francis, sings with glee when his beloved Catherine accepts marriage. Being in a Tudor street, however, he ends up singing (and getting covered) in urine (parody of Singin' in the Rain, with special guest star Miles Jupp)! "Let's Talk About Theatre": A shocked presenter discovers the state of Tudor theatres and finds out the inspiration behind Romeo and Juliet - Romeus and Juliet! A Tudor doctor advertises the importance of not eating your five-a-day. A Tudor man who seeks the job as an actor in Shakespeare's plays is disappointed with the young woman he's playing. Horrible Histories Horticultural Society Garden Show in the time of William Shakespeare (or HHHSGSITTOWS): Taking a look at the best Tudor gardening methods to keep pests away and the finding out why the Ottoman "Head" Gardener is called so (parody of RHS flower shows). Historical Desktops: While using his tablet, the Bard quickly comes up with a play for King James I to earn the title of "The King's Men". A Tudor man who had been seeking for a suitable job as an actor in one of Shakespeare's plays has finally been granted a part, what he fears, however, is the awfully realistic bear noises the other "actor" is making. "Escape to the Historical Country": Shakespeare buys his new country home in Stratford-upon-Avon (parody of Escape to the Country). Shakespeare and his wife go to their local market, but are soon interrupted when people start quoting him. Horrible Publishing: Shakespeare attempts to get his work published in a slightly different format, however, it seems all of his original ideas has been used (featuring special guest star Mel Giedroyc).
"Staggering Storytellers"	Lucy Clarke, Dave Cohen, Gerard Foster, Ben Partridge, Danny Peak, Ben Ward, Daniel Maier	11 July 2016
An episode dedicated to the BBCs 'Love to Read' campaign through 2016. Songs: Comedy (parody of Tragedy by Bee Gees); Book Magic (parody of Little Mix's Black Magic); Sketches: Early man puts on a show, telling a story through cave paintings. Tips for Struggling Writers No. 12: D.H. Lawrence explains what bizarre thing he does when he gets a case of writer’s block. The Great Storytellers Bake Off: Roald Dahl, Lewis Carroll and Enid Blyton compete in a Bake Off, cooking up worm cake, edible teacups and water that can shrink its consumer! Famous Indian storyteller, Vishnu Sharma, struggles to get his stories' morals across to one family. Tips for Struggling Writers No. 17: George Eliot explains her solution to how female writers in Victorian times can be taken seriously. William Caxton struggles to deal with a customer who does not quite understand that there is only one book printed in English in the whole medieval world. Three famous fictional detectives, Hercule Poirot, Sherlock Holmes and Chevalier Auguste Dupin, arrive at the scene of a supposed murder, only to be left arguing over which one of them was the greatest. Tips for Struggling Writers No. 64: Beatrix Potter explains the downside to writing in code. John William Polidori and Mary Shelley come up with The Vampyre and Frankenstein on the same night during a scary storytelling competition at Lord Byron's house. Tips for Struggling Writers No. 80: Alfred, Lord Tennyson reveals his top party trick to keep him amused. HHTV News: Charles Dickens arrives in America, 1867, only to be smothered by a large crowd of fans and lovers. Horrible Publishing: The Bronte Sisters try to get their work published, forgetting all about the Bronte brother.
"The Grisly Great Fire Of London"	Dave Cohen, Sarah Morgan, Danny Peak, Steve Punt, Joe Tucker, Danielle Ward, Raphael Warner, Ben Ward, Daniel Maier	5 September 2016
Starring Robert Webb as Christopher Wren; A special episode marking 350 years since the Great Fire of London. Song: Starting Over Again (parody of One Direction's "Over Again"); Sketches: "Come to Restoration (Plague-Ridden) England": The joys of Restoration Britain with no more Cromwell and thus the return of theatre and sport, but surely not the plague? (parody of VisitEngland); Charles II and his friends and family celebrate a New Year's Eve Party as the end of the dreadful plague-ridden 1665 closes, hoping that 1666 can only be better! HHTV News: The Great Fire of London breaks out in Pudding Lane with some strange accusations about who started it. Historical Desktops: Through his tablet, Samuel Pepys fails to get the King or Lord Mayor Bloodworth to deal with the fire that has broken out, who don't seem very concerned! "Knightmayor": Lord Mayor Bloodworth figures the best solution to the Great Fire is to go to sleep or hide (movie trailer parody)! HHTV News: The Great Fire is on its second day, and the Duke of York grabs hold of some help, literally. Caribbean Pirates Rupert and Henry recognise one another from their Civil War days fighting for the King and stop amid battle for a nice conversation. "The Great Fire Bake Off": Thomas Farriner tries cooking something other than London, infuriated that is all that is known of him, whilst author Hannah Woolley teaches Paul some table manners. HHTV News: The fire is finally extinguished and many are searching for their lost beloved ones, including the devastated Samuel Pepys searching for his buried cheese! "Prime Suspects 1666": The hunt is on for the person who started the fire, and the boss is determined to find out, or at least choose who to blame (parody of Prime Suspect). "Let's Talk About Science": The more eccentric side of the Royal Society is shown as Newton explains his odd ideas, Wren tries to teach a spider to dance, and Boyle succeeds in making a dead dog wee, much to the horror of one posh presenter. "Historical Grand Designs": Wren and Hooke plan to re-build London and design a new cathedral, making the most of the tragedy which Wren sees as brilliant.

=== Series 7 (2017–2018) ===
In 2017 another full-length series of fifteen themed episodes began airing, the premiere a month ahead of the rest of the series. The last five episodes were not aired on TV until the following spring but were available on DVD from November.

Between September 5 and September 23, the BBC ran a competition to write a sketch for Horrible Histories with the winning entry by Abigail Innes (age 8) from Hull being filmed as part of the seventh series. Her sketch was shown in the last episode of the series.

No.	Title	Written by	Original release date
701	"Monstrous Musicians"	Lucy Clarke, Dave Cohen, Paul Davighi, Ben Partridge, Danny Peak, Howard Read, Ben Ward, Daniel Maier, Christine Rose, Martin Trenaman	15 June 2017
An episode dedicated to the BBCs "Music Day" campaign through 2017. Song: "Horrible Hearts Club Band: The History of Music" (parody of Sgt. Pepper's Lonely Hearts Club Band, performed by the entire Series 7 cast, lead singing by Jessica Ransom); Sketches: "Neanderthal Choral Classics": The enchanting sounds of pre-history available on DVD from the golden age of rock(s). A young Celt is taught how to play the Carnyx war horn with some awful results – but not awful enough! A group of Vikings partake in their traditional dancing, only to be interrupted by a Saxon man, amused by their unusual moves. "Now That's What I Call... Whipping Songs 14th Century" hits out some flagellant songs, quite literally, while they try to free themselves from sin. (parody of Justin Bieber's best hits). "Historical Educating": Wolfgang Amadeus Mozart - The great composer Mozart comes to class 7F, but his teachings are a little "off the guff"! (parody of Educating). German pianist Daniel Steibelt challenges the great Ludwig van Beethoven to a duel, and it's not long until they show off their tricks! "The H Factor": Beethoven shows off his stuff, but will he please the judges (parody of The X Factor)? The foreman suspects (correctly) that slaves in Harriet Tubman's time were using songs to pass messages around, but if he's just stupid enough they might get away! Dead Lounge: John Cage performs his most famous piece, 4'33", which silences the room. No, really. "The H Factor": Gioachino Rossini prepares to wow the judges with his unwritten overture, but instead makes quite the fool of himself. The presenters of The Ed Sullivan Show of 1957 get ready to film, but Elvis Presley's dancing causes a bit of a commotion and lots of swooning! Dead Lounge: Sixties sensation Jimi Hendrix rocks on and burns on in the Dead Lounge. "The H Factor": Henry Purcell tries to please the judges, unfortunately for him, he didn't please his wife.
702	"Exceptional Explorers"	Beth Chalmers, Lucy Clarke, Dave Cohen, Gerrard Foster, Danny Peak, Amy Shindler, Ben Ward, Daniel Maier, Christine Rose, Martin Trenaman	24 July 2017
An episode dedicated to the history of exploration. Songs: "I've Got a Brand New Land to Find" (parody of "The Combine Harvester") "Frozen Freuchen" (parody of "Let It Go" and "Love Is an Open Door" from Frozen) "Explore" (parody of Katy Perry's "Roar"), performed by Jessica Ransom with Gemma Whelan; Sketches: A preview for "The Explorers", a retrospective on the discovery of new lands (and their natives). Nero sends his legions on a perilous (and slippery) journey to discover the source of the Nile. A Saxon woman is raided by a big, hairy, blonde man – but in a police line-up, we learn that not all Scandinavian Vikings are the same. The Mayans, wanting to be left alone, give their Spaniard enemies the run-around with directions to El Dorado, the supposed city of gold! "Historical Educating": Christopher Columbus - Columbus comes to class 7F, but his poor navigational skills cause confusion, and the job goes a bit pear-shaped! Stuart fangirls get overexcited over a somewhat dull fruit brought back from overseas. Whilst Ernest Shackleton seeks help over seas and mountains, his team left behind make the most of the South Pole life. Various explorers' culinary approach to dogs doesn't get much approval from the Historical Dogs Appreciation Society whilst trying to shoot an advertisement. Alan Shepard remembers at the last minute before lift-off that he needs to relieve himself.
703	"Ridiculous Romantics"	Jake Bernhardt, Lucy Clarke, Dave Cohen, The Dawson Brothers, Gaby Hutchinson Crouch, Ben Ward, Daniel Maier, Christine Rose, Martin Trenaman	31 July 2017
An episode all about weird romance throughout history. Song: "Casanova" (parody of LMFAO's "Sexy And I Know It"), performed by Tom Stourton with Jessica Ransom and Ellie White; Sketches: Throughout the episode, Henry VIII goes through his six wives on "Historical First Dates", with the help of Maître d' Fred Sirieix (parody of First Dates). The strange fashion habits of the Renaissance Italians mixed with all the modern lingo. Medieval Bavaria has a very strange custom of finding love. HHTV News: The British Royal Wedding of 1736 has plenty of positives, whilst the couple found the event not so idealistic, and in fact, a bit nauseating! The Sacred Band of Thebes get into their own fights as they learn being a Greek army of couples has its downsides. "Now That's What I Call Real Love Letters from History" highlights many of the actual love letters written to loved ones - from Ancient Egypt through to Tsar Nicholas II, these unique letters are put to music. Alfonso VIII's bride has unexpectedly sent a male stand-in as she can't make it, but things soon get confusing for the Spanish King and stressful for the Vicar.. Louis XVI and Marie Antoinette's post-wedding private time is made more difficult by their courtiers, who find themselves giving some fishy tips on how to kiss a woman.
704	"Atrocious Artists"	James Bugg, Dave Cohen, Ben Partridge, The Dawson Brothers, Daniel Peak, Steve Punt, Ben Ward, Daniel Maier, Christine Rose, Martin Trenaman	7 August 2017
An episode all about the history of art, from the very first drawings on walls in caves to pop art. Song: "Hello, It's-a Me" (parody of Adele's "Hello"), performed by Gemma Whelan and Tom Stourton with Richard David-Caine; Sketches: The Teenage Mutant Ninja Renaissance Artists' skills aren't much help when it comes to stopping a mugging (parody of Teenage Mutant Ninja Turtles). A caveman tries to impress his date with some good cave paintings at an old art gallery, but the first paintings seem a bit too realistic for his date. HHTV News: Swill Gumbitz discovers the surprising true colours of ancient Greek statues after a bad start with the Athenian he means to interview. "Historical Gogglebox: Giottobox edition" shows how Giotto's more realistic paintings and perspective are getting people talking. Vigee Le Brun causes a stir when showing teeth in her portrait and one man tries to scare her away from her racy idea. Tips for Artists No. 19: Chris Ofili shows off a rather messy (and smelly) way of painting. A look into Joshua Reynolds's studio, where his celebrity paintings are giving him quite a lot of attention, so much that he is becoming one himself with the girls. Picasso and Dalí show off their way of paying for things with MasterPiece (parody of MasterCard). Filming for an episode of "The Security Guards" is continually interrupted by the repeated thefts of Rembrandt's Jacob de Gheyn III. Some of the most famous 20th-century artists meet together in an art class, but the teacher doesn't approve much of various artists' styles of painting. Jackson Pollock doesn't seem to like a collector's attempts to buy his works, nor the fan's ability to judge a splatter of paint with Pollock's abstract art. "Historical Educating": Salvador Dalí - The class gets quite confused by Salvador Dalí's surreal approach to art and weird ways of life, despite his rather edible CV. Tips for Artists No. 54: Andy Warhol seems to think green pants are the key to success.
705	"Heroic Heroes And Villainous Villains"	Lucy Clarke, Dave Cohen, Gerard Foster, Danny Peak, Howard Read, Ben Ward, Daniel Maier, Christine Rose, Martin Trenaman	14 August 2017
An episode highlighting various heroic and villainous figures throughout history. Songs: "Downtown Threat" (parody of Mark Ronson and Bruno Mars's "Uptown Funk"), performed by Ryan Sampson with Tom Stourton, Richard David-Caine, James McNicolas and Samson Kayo "They Were the Heroes" (parody of David Bowie's "Heroes"), performed by Samson Kayo; Sketches: Armstrong, Collins, and Aldrin are shown their (rather complicated) briefing on their mission, but these unthought-of ideas give off the wrong impression. "Historical Grand Designs": Ramesses II shows off his Ramesseum, which seems a bit too statue-full, much to his wife's displeasure. Chaos ensues when it becomes forbidden to mention Herostratus's name in Ancient Greece. "History's Deadly 60": Steve Biceps observes the wicked Butcher of Cumberland in action (parody of Deadly 60). Matthew Hopkins advertises "Witch Out", his all-new, all-expensive, and all-helpless ideas to prevent witches coming to homes (partial parody of Cillit Bang adverts). Tips for Heroes No. 85: When onboard without toilets, Sir Walter Raleigh shows the alternative. In Occupied France, legless Douglas Bader stalls his captors long enough to make an escape whilst a new leg is sent over. Back on "History's Deadly 60", Steve Biceps observes the foiling of Guy Fawkes's attempt to blow up the King. HHTV News: Whilst Pocahontas gives her speech, there is some confusion with the British as to who discovered whom, and who the real savages are. Back on "History's Deadly 60" again, we observe Roderick Maclean's attempt to assassinate Queen Victoria and how a group of Eton schoolboys help save the day.
706	"Ingenious Inventors"	Lucy Clarke, Dave Cohen, Gerard Foster, Danny Peak, Howard Read, Ben Ward, Gemma Whelan, Daniel Maier, Christine Rose, Martin Trenaman	21 August 2017
An episode dedicated to the history of human invention, from the wheel to television. Song: "And This is What we Do With It..." (parody of Bob Dylan's "Subterranean Homesick Blues" and karaoke videos, features clips from other episodes) performed by Jalaal Hartley, features all Series 7 cast members Sketches: A cavewomen shares an invention we all can benefit from, but another man's idea seems to impress more. The Ancient Chinese and Greece fight it out through rap who the best inventors were, alongside a not-so-hip Roman and his invention. A Roman boy tries to convince his mother that the new codex is far more efficient than scrolls whilst she attempts to read a bedtime story. Johannes Gutenberg advertises his all-new printed Bible, created by his invention, the Printing Press, but it gives one monk a hard time. Ishmael al-Jawhari's wife looks up definitions in his new dictionary whilst he attempts to master manned flight. "Historical Educating": Leonardo da Vinci - Da Vinci has a crack at teaching 7F anatomy and dissection, before encouraging creative arts and the construction of paper planes, much to Mrs. Lawrence's displeasure. The Wright Brothers struggle to decide which of them should make their first attempt at human flight. Hedy Lamarr tries to pitch her frequency-hopping system for guided torpedoes to the US Navy, who continually interrupt the film star. When a customer complains about the size of his fries, George Crum gets rather angry, which soon leads to an invention of a new food we still eat today. Alexander Graham Bell advertises his new myPhone and all it can do, whilst annoying Mr. Watson (parody of iPhone). Historical Gogglebox: The first TV set is getting everyone talking until John Logie Baird blows up the supply.
707	"Preposterous US Presidents"	Lucy Clarke, Gerard Foster, Jess Ransom, Howard Read, George Sawyer, Joe Tucker, Ben Ward, Raphael Warner, Daniel Maier, Christine Rose, Martin Trenaman	28 August 2017
An episode highlighting the life and times of selected US presidents. Song: Mister President (parody of Jimi Hendrix's version of The Star-Spangled Banner) performed by Tom Stourton, Richard David-Caine, Jalaal Hartley, Ryan Sampson and Samson Kayo; Sketches: George Washington advertises his book, which explains all of his "tactical master plans", from the Battle of Long Island through to the Battle of White Plains. "Historical Brand Designers": The Founding Fathers must decide on a seal for the USA, but are resistant to most of the designs (parody of W1A); Historical Desktops: Napoleon is selling off New Orleans and Thomas Jefferson, via tablet, is keen to get his hands on it, and after an interruption from King George III, Jefferson manages to negotiate very well! One cowboy is outraged when he hears that English is not the only language being spoken, but one message gets across clearly. One loud-mouthed guest who took after Andrew Jackson continually interrupts his funeral. Abraham Lincoln, via tablet, appears on an online chat and is given some strange advice from one young girl - Grace Bedell. Northern Statist, Mary Bowser, takes on the dangerous job of going undercover as a slave – but will she fool her Confederate enemies? Three agents don't quite understand their job in the "Secret Service" and have a better time at the Theatre than Lincoln does, after they meet him and actor and assassin, John Wilkes Booth. It doesn't end well. Hunter, soldier, boxer, and President, Theodore Roosevelt, is none too pleased when he discovers what is named in his honour. First Lady, Eleanor Roosevelt, surprises her personal aide with her care for those in the Great Depression and makes clear she is not interested in her appearance. When Fidel Castro gets too "comfy" with the Russians in 1961, John F Kennedy's men explain the many ways they attempted to assassinate "The Beard" whilst Bob tries his best to destroy everything that could harm the President.
708	"Ruthless Rulers"	Lucy Clarke, Dave Cohen, Gerard Foster, Sarah Morgan, Danny Peak, Howard Read, Tom Stourton, Ben Ward, Daniel Maier, Christine Rose, Martin Trenaman	4 September 2017
An episode about rulers of all kinds, good and bad. Song: "Warlords from Hell" (parody of "Highway to Hell" by AC/DC), performed by Ryan Sampson, Tom Stourton, Samson Kayo, and Dan Li; Sketches: Ruthless Russian ruler, Ivan the Terrible, doesn't seem pleased with his title when a narrator tries to create a film trailer about him. Throughout the episode, Elizabeth I takes on a series of possible husbands in "Historical First Dates". Henry VIII just wants to get to sleep, but the checks he demanded keep him up (and down), with not much peace at all! "Bridget Holmes's Diary": Starring the longest-serving servant in history with a job at the bottom, literally (parody of the Bridget Jones trilogy). "Historical Brand Designers": The "design cavalry" pitch their ideas to James VI and I for a flag that will unite the two nations... such as tartan Stonehenge? "Match of the Danes": Cnut the Great reveals his surprise new signing, Thorkell the Tall, which causes some controversy. After all his Viking destruction, Cnut must win back the English public by apologising, but he and his Vikings find sorry seems to be the hardest word to say. Persian King, Xerxes the Great, enforces a rather unusual law, but nobody seems to be cheered up at all... wonder why? Tips for Rulers No. 43: Queen Hatshepsut, the first female leader of Egypt, is forced to wear something quite odd to be taken seriously. The English Ambassador and his wife are shocked to see that Louis XIV's palace has 700 rooms, but one fundamental room is missing and causes a hard time for the English Ambassador.
709	"Revolting Russian Revolutions"	Jack Bernhardt, Dave Cohen, Gerard Foster, Sarah Morgan, Danny Peak, Howard Read, Ben Ward, Daniel Maier, Christine Rose, Martin Trenaman	11 September 2017
An episode celebrating the hundredth anniversary of the Russian Revolution. Songs: "Back in USSR" (parody of "Back In The U.S.S.R." by The Beatles) "The Iron Curtain Falls" (parody of "Viva la Vida" by Coldplay); Sketches: The Romanovs/Tsar Nicholas II - X-Treme Survival: Tsar Nicholas II gives his survival tips to survive through the extremes of Russia; of course, they are only helpful if you happen to be Tsar and if you are, watch how you go about with your people! The Marx Cast: Karl Marx, the man who came up with Communism, shares his predictions for Europe's forecast over the next few centuries. Vladimir Lenin gives yet another Communism lecture in yet another unusual place, but his comrades soon get slightly pre-occupied. In an attempt to boost morale, Nicholas II visits some of his soldiers fighting in the Great War, but his efforts are not particularly impressive. HHTV News: It's 1917 and revolution kicks off in Russia, beginning with Katy Woe's interviews with Lenin and flicking back and forth to Robin Percil with the invasion of the Tsar's home, along with disguises, generals, and a lot of arguments between the reporters! Lenin's Revolutionary Embalming Process: Lenin shares his secret to looking young and alive, even if you're dead! "Uncle Joe Stalin's Nursery Rhymes": A "much improved" edition of classic nursery rhymes, by Stalin, is advertised and you'd better be careful around him! (partial parody of CBeebies). Dave TDS vlogs as he attempts to take over Russia through the years, from Charles XII of Sweden through to Hitler, but the Russians always have one special move (parody of DanTDM videos and computer games)... Stalin decides the answer to defeat the Chinese lies in Chairman Mao Zedong's faeces and comes up with a cunning plan. HHTV News: The Soviet Union declares war on the West; Katy Woe and Robin Percil have the latest updates again, from the Berlin Wall to the red button no-one dares to press and some misunderstanding about the Iron Curtain.
710	"Horrid Health"	Lucy Clarke, Dave Cohen, Howard Davidson, Gerard Foster, Sarah Morgan, Danny Peak, Ben Ward, Daniel Maier, Christine Rose, Martin Trenaman	18 September 2017
A history of the weird and wacky ideas about health. Songs: "The Grime Master St. Jerome" "Good Vaccinations" (parody of "Good Vibrations" by The Beach Boys), performed by Ryan Sampson, Richard David-Caine and Jalaal Hartley; Sketches: Introducing the new 14th-century Chinese hygiene revolution: toilet paper. A caveman goes to see a medicine woman in hopes that she can cure his headache. A group of pregnant ancient Egyptian women discuss how they know if their baby will be a boy or a girl. A Maya doctor has a simple cure-all that he recommends to all his patients. Fitness First: Chat with your friends and stay up-to-date on the latest news in the Roman steam rooms - naked! (parody of Fitness First). "Historical Educating": Hippocrates - The Father of Medicine has some rather disgusting methods of determining someone's health, to his students' dismay. A sailor gives his fellows a safety briefing with the help of a brand new book: The Art of Swimming. "Historical Embarrassing Bodies": Hairdresser and surgeon Charles-François Félix needs to perform a surgery on King Louis XIV in a rather delicate location (parody of Embarrassing Bodies). Horrible Histories Health Direct: The Tudor and medieval doctors provide advice on how to deal with the Black Death while their Mayan colleague has a one-track mind. A Georgian man takes his sweetheart to buy an unusual fashion accessory: a set of false teeth. Dr. John Harvey Kellogg advertises the Battle Creek Sanitarium, a place where you can relax, exercise, and above all else, eat his invention corn flakes. The Queen Victoria Shopping Channel advertises the latest in electric healing products from the Great Exhibition.
711	"Formidable Florence Nightingale"	Unknown	6 November 2017 (DVD); 8 March 2018 (TV)
Starring Jessica Ransom as Florence Nightingale; There is much more to Florence Nightingale than being "The Lady with the Lamp". We follow Florence as she embarks on her journey to help the soldiers in the Crimean War, and in doing so changes the world of nursing forever. Not to mention her obsession with unusually named cats. All with your trusty guide Rattus to lead the way. Songs: "All About This Base" (parody of "All About That Bass" by Meghan Trainor) "I Brought About" (parody of "Chandelier" by Sia), performed by Jessica Ransom Sketches: "Florence Nightingale - The Lady with the Lamp": Florence Nightingale isn't pleased by how obsessed people are with her lamp (movie trailer parody). Florence and the man at the career office have different ideas about the ideal career for her. "Historical Sun, Sea & Suspicious Parents": Florence's family sends her on a tour around the world to discourage her nursing dreams (parody of Sun, Sex and Suspicious Parents). Lord Cardigan's Crimean War X-Treme Survival: The Earl of Cardigan gives advice on how to find food, stay warm, and find shelter in the Crimean War. Come to the Crimea: Watch soldiers drown and have picnics by the battlefield at the site of the Crimean War (advertisement). A soldier is desperate not to be taken to a place that means certain death: the hospital. A couple honeymooning in Crimea have a reservation at Mary Seacole's British Hotel, but find it's not what they expected. The Florence Nightingale School of Nursing: For the first time, women can take up nursing as an actual career, but Florence won't employ just anyone (advertisement). "Embarrassing Victorian Bodies": A Victorian woman goes to extreme measures to look thinner and paler. Cartomania: A new Victorian card collecting game featuring pictures of celebrities. Florence is very annoyed by the merchandise and attention that come with her new-found fame. A visit to the elderly Florence's "office" goes awry thanks to her many cats.
712	"Deadly Dynasties"	Unknown	6 November 2017 (DVD); 7 May 2018 (TV)
Horrible Histories takes a look at some of the most famous families that have shaped the world, including the Romanovs of Russia, the Tudors of England, and Ramesses and his children in Ancient Egypt ... all 162 of them! The First Emperor of China Qin Shi Huang takes the mic, and Rattus invites his nephew, Scrappus, to help explore the Great Rattus dynasty, but as we discover families are never straightforward. Song: "Qin Shi Huang" (parody of "Cheerleader" by Omi) Sketches: "Agrippina Bites": Agrippina teaches the viewer how to make a dish to die for. "162 Kids and Counting": Pharaoh Ramesses II has trouble keeping track of his 162 children (parody of 19 Kids and Counting). Queen Eleanor of Aquitaine gives a Royal Christmas Message. HH TV News: King Henry VI struggles to keep the peace on Love Day. A series of vlogs chronicles the constant heir-changing of the Tudor dynasty. Maria Theresa tries to figure out which of her many daughters named Maria will be Queen of France. Napoleon's generosity towards his family gets taken advantage of by his spendthrift sister Pauline. The future Queen Catherine the Great "plays" a game of Romanov takeover with her husband Peter. "At Home with the Curies": Ève Curie invites her new boyfriend, Henry Richardson Labouisse, over to meet her obsessive Nobel Peace Prize-winning family. George V struggles to come up with a new, less German-sounding surname.
713	"Savage Songs"	Unknown	6 November 2017 (DVD); 7 May 2018 (TV)
Savage Songs: An episode featuring songs from the series. Join the Horrible Hearts Club Band to sing through music, or go Downtown Threat with Al Capone. "Downtown Threat" (from S07E05), "Hello, It's-a Me" (from S07E04), "Warlords from Hell" (from S07E08), "Frozen Freuchen" (from S07E02), "Good Vaccinations" (from S07E10), "All About This Base" (from S07E11), "They Were the Heroes" (from S07E05), "Horrible Hearts Club Band: The History of Music" (from S07E01).
714	"Awesome Ancient Civilisations"	Unknown	6 November 2017 (DVD); 7 May 2018 (TV)
The team takes a look at many ancient cultures. Sketches: "Neanderthal Choral Classics": The enchanting sounds of pre-history available on DVD from the golden age of rock(s) (from S07E01). A cavewoman shares an invention we all can benefit from, but another man's idea seems to impress more (from S07E06). Introducing the new 14th-century Chinese hygiene revolution: toilet paper (from S07E10). "Historical Grand Designs": Ramesses II shows off his Ramesseum, which seems a bit too statue-full, much to his wife's displeasure. Chaos ensues when it becomes forbidden to mention Herostratus's name in Ancient Greece (from S07E05). HHTV News: Swill Gumbitz discovers the surprising true colours of ancient Greek statues after a bad start with the Athenian he means to interview (from S07E04). The Sacred Band of Thebes get into their own fights as they learn being a Greek army of couples has its downsides (from S07E03). An unfortunate Assyrian man finds out the words "no parking" were taken very seriously back then. Alex the Great finds out about kissing. "Agrippina Bites": Agrippina teaches the viewer how to make a dish to die for (from S07E12). Emperor Nero performs a concert on the lyre, and he really likes to take his time. A young Celt is taught how to play the Carnyx war horn with some awful results – but not awful enough! (from S07E01). The Romans, Greeks, and Chinese face off in a rap battle (from S07E06).
715	"Terrible Tudors"	Unknown	6 November 2017 (DVD); 7 May 2018 (TV)
Go through the history of the Tudor dynasty, through from Henry VII to Elizabeth I. Along the way, also find out about Mary I in her vlog. Sketches: Throughout the episode, Henry VIII goes through two of his wives on "Historical First Dates", with the help of Maître d' Fred Sirieix (from S07E03). Henry VIII just wants to get to sleep, but the checks he demanded keep him up (and down), with not much peace at all! (from S07E08). A series of vlogs chronicles the constant heir-changing of the Tudor dynasty (from S07E12). "Historical Educating": Christopher Columbus - Columbus comes to class 7F, but his poor navigational skills cause confusion, and the job goes a bit pear-shaped! (from S07E02). Throughout the episode, Elizabeth I takes on two possible husbands in "Historical First Dates" (from S07E08). The Mayans, wanting to be left alone, give their Spaniard enemies the run-around with directions to El Dorado, the supposed city of gold! "I've Got a Brand New Land to Find" (from S07E02). A Tudor family gets a visit from the bow-and-arrow inspector (written by Abigail Innes (age 8), winner of a competition).

=== Series 8 (2019–2020) ===
In June 2019 an eighth series began airing on CBBC, and for the first time ever, the next episode was exclusively available on BBC iPlayer. This is also the first series where a selection of guest stars have helped present the show with Rattus for several episodes. But the format remains much the same.

No.	Title	Written by	Original release date
801	"Queen Vic's Home Vids"	Unknown	3 June 2019
A special marking 200 years since the birth of film. Song: "The Moving Picture Show" (parody of "The Greatest Show", from The Greatest Showman); Sketches: Queen Victoria herself becomes one of the world's first movie stars when her Royal Photographer films her in various situations. Two high-class Victorian ladies go out to see a movie, but the experience isn't quite as lengthy as today. William Kennedy Dickson wants to film Herbert Beerbohm Tree enacting the death of King John, but the actor proves difficult. A man takes a job as a cameraman for a phantom ride film, but regrets his decision when he learns what exactly the job entails. A group of cameramen all want to film Queen Victoria's Diamond Jubilee, but there are only so many spots to film from. HHTV News reports on the Diamond Jubilee with an exclusive interview with Keir Hardie. Wilhelm II makes a video rant about how annoyed he is about not being invited to the Diamond Jubilee, even if he concedes he may have made a few faux pas. A film about the war in South Africa is filmed in Yorkshire, but one of the actresses has trouble wrapping her head around the concept. SpeedyVictorianTravel.com advertises a not-so-quick trip to Pompeii, Italy. Prince Ranjitsinhji gives an interview about his time on the Cambridge cricket team, but a nearby upper-class couple finds the idea laughable.
802	"Fashion Faux Pas"	Unknown	3 June 2019 (BBC iPlayer); 10 June 2019 (TV)
The horrible history of fashion. Songs: King Tut's Haul (parody of "Thrift Shop" by Macklemore & Ryan Lewis and Wanz) "Coco Chanel" (parody of "Tilted" by Christine and the Queens) Sketches: Emporio Anubis presents Fat-Head, the Egyptian perfumed wax cone that's placed on your head and melts throughout the day (advertisement). The Roman Emperor has made it law to wear the unfortunately rather cumbersome toga. "Viking Eye for a Saxon Guy": Two vikings glam up a Saxon peasant (parody of Queer Eye for the Straight Guy). We get a look at three medieval upper-class women as they trade beauty tips. Henry VIII and Maximilian I have an online feud over who's the best armour maker. There's a new trend at the court of Elizabeth I: looking exactly like the queen. Louis XV meets his future mistress Madame de Pompadour at a fancy dress party, but his costume makes the flirting somewhat confusing. Two Macaronis compare outfits before finding out their third compatriot has changed his style. The fashion of rebellious young women through the ages, from the 1890s to Victorian women gets compared to its counterpart one generation later. Two Victorian women on GloomTube give advice on how to look fashionable while in mourning. The fashion comparisons continue as a young woman from the 1950s scandalises her parents with her t-shirt and jeans.
803	"Chaotic Collabs"	Unknown	10 June 2019 (BBC iPlayer); 17 June 2019 (TV)
History is filled with tales of great minds coming together and collaborating, to achieve incredible things. It's also full of idiots working together to create an unholy mess, and people forming partnerships for decidedly sinister reasons - welcome to Horrible Histories' Chaotic Collabs! Song: "The Romantic Poets" Sketches: "Mission: Incompetent": The bumbling group of assassins known as the Black Hand is tasked with assassinating Archduke Franz Ferdinand of Austria (parody of Mission: Impossible). "Historical Educating": Burke and Hare - Mr. Burke and Mr. Hare tell the students about their unconventional business model: murder. Pharaoh Akhenaten and Queen Nefertiti hire PR specialists Sophie and Sebastian to give their pantheon a makeover. Ahoy! Magazine tells all about Britain's hottest couple, Lord Nelson and Emma Hamilton - both of whom are married to someone else! We join Sir Edmund Hillary and Tenzing Norgay as Norgay saves the ungrateful Hillary's life and the two are chosen to be first to the top of Mount Everest... if the first choice doesn't make it. President Roosevelt needs to have an urgent meeting with Winston Churchill, but finds he's willing to wait a bit when he sees what the British Prime Minister is currently up to. The story of Hillary and Norgay continues as they end up the first people on the summit of Mount Everest, but they can't quite agree on which one was the very first. William Shakespeare has a brainstorming session with fellow playwrights Thomas Middleton and Ben Jonson about how to make Macbeth more to the liking of the King. Charles Dickens invites fellow best-selling author Hans Christian Andersen to his home for a collaboration, but the Danish author's eccentricities drive him and his family to distraction.
804	"Mind Your Manners!"	Unknown	17 June 2019 (BBC iPlayer); 24 June 2019 (TV)
Rattus is panicking, as the Rat Queen is visiting the sewer and he has no idea how to behave nicely around royalty! Not only that, if he can somehow appear attractive to the Queen, maybe he could be the next Rat King?! Luckily, help is at hand in the (very well-mannered) shape of First Dates' Fred Sirieix, a man who knows all about how to behave politely in high society. Fred will guide Rattus through the Horrible History of Manners and Etiquette, in a bid to help him on his quest. Song: "Court Me Maybe" (parody of "Call Me Maybe" by Carly Rae Jepsen) Sketches: When a Greek soldier finds out his grandfather was shown hospitality by his enemy's grandfather, he protects the enemy soldier and gives him gifts according to the Greek custom of xenia. Thomas Coryat brings the first fork to England, to the mockery of his friends in the "Fraternity of Sireniacal Gentlemen". A man desperate not to be rude in front of the Roman Emperor dies in a rather unusual way. "Historical Saturday Kitchen Live": Kate McCook interviews chefs from a variety of time periods and places who all share an ingredient: human body parts (parody of Saturday Kitchen). Queen Victoria is a quick eater, which turns a posh Victorian dinner into a competition. A Victorian lady considers hiring a professional mourner for her husband's funeral. Sir Harry Breaky-Bottom teaches his ThouTube viewers about important points in the code of chivalry, such as poetry and painting. Georgian Fan Messages: To help young Georgian ladies use their fan to communicate with men without speaking to them - as long as they don't use the wrong gesture (advertisement). Pitz! lets Tudor women tell men they're interested in them - by giving them an apple they keep in their armpit (advertisement). Jane Austen competes in "Historical Love Island", but the modern man interested in her isn't quite ready for all the rules of Georgian courting (Love Island parody with special guest Iain Stirling). Indian love guru Vātsyāyana gives a modern man advice on how to salvage his date.
805	"Fearsome Families"	Unknown	24 June 2019 (BBC iPlayer); 1 July 2019 (TV)
Families - sometimes you love them, sometimes you bicker with them, and sometimes you marry them off to consolidate your power in Europe. Welcome to a look at some of history's most fearsome families. Song: "Bronte Sisterhood"; Sketches: Throughout the episode, Queen Victoria makes several trips to the "Historical First Dates" restaurant in a bid to marry off her children for love, and definitely not to consolidate her empire. Leopold Mozart is lovingly retiring his 18-year-old daughter Maria Anna from performing in public, in favour of bringing little Wolfgang into the spotlight. Henry VIII's daughters engage in a regal game of "Your Mum". Paulina Pepys is grateful to her brother Samuel when he offers a roof over her head, at least until she learns about the conditions. "Made in Macedonia": For some reason, people standing in the way of Alexander the Great becoming king keep dying. His mum Olympias has no idea why that could be. (parody of Made in Chelsea); We see what happened back at home for Viking families when the male Vikings went away pillaging for months. A Spartan family who has come to see the Olympic Games learn that married women are not allowed to watch the event. We take a look at what Puritan children did for fun as they head down to the "fun" theme park "Puritown".
806	"Bizarre Beasts"	Unknown	1 July 2019 (BBC iPlayer); 8 July 2019 (TV)
A look at some of the various ways in which, throughout history, humans have lived with, worked with, and interacted with animals. Song: "We're Grateful" (parody of "You're Welcome" from Moana); Sketches: Charles Darwin hosts "Yummy Planet", a look at some of the animals he actually ate whilst on his travels (parody of Our Planet). A stone age couple accidentally domesticates a wolf. Romans release an album in praise of their favourite pet: eels. The keeper of Elizabeth I's menagerie suggests that maybe the various exotic animals in it are starting to outgrow the Tower of London. Sophie and Sebastian advise both Alexander the Great and Porus as to which animals they could use in battle to defeat their enemies: each other. The Australian army faces the unruly might of an emu invasion. Farting fish almost cause a nuclear war. An auction is held of some medieval animal art, with the twist that the artists have never seen the animals they painted. Three cavemen make a video where they take on the Cow Milk Challenge. A Victorian couple goes shopping for some coprolite jewellery.
807	"Moon Mayhem"	Unknown	8 July 2019 (BBC iPlayer); 15 July 2019 (TV)
Comedian and space nerd Dara Ó Briain joins Rattus as guest host for a special show that marks the anniversary of the 1969 Moon landings. Songs: "Round and Round" (parody of "Right Round" by Flo Rida) "Flying to the Moon" (parody of "Fly Me to the Moon" by Bart Howard); Sketches: Neil Armstrong is the first man to walk on the Moon, while Buzz Aldrin gets a less glamorous first. A Babylonian king is told that the heavens have foretold that terrible things will happen to the king, but he has a loophole. "Historical Educating": John Wilkins - The 17th-century philosopher and supply teacher tells his class about their upcoming field trip to the Moon. Lagâri Hasan Çelebi achieves the first manned rocket-powered flight at a celebration for a sultan. The Russian and Americans compete in sending things to space, with the Russians sending a spooky (and annoying) satellite and a dummy reciting recipes for borscht, and the Americans enlisting the help of Sophie and Sebastian. Yuri Gagarin is the first man in space, but his father isn't impressed. We meet America's solution to finally getting ahead in the race and getting a man on the Moon: a "computer" called Katherine Johnson. The Apollo 10 crew is faced with the horror of someone's poo floating around in the cockpit. Michael Collins has a live stream while he waits to pick up Neil Armstrong and Buzz Aldrin, but his chat isn't impressed.
808	"Putrid Politics"	Unknown	15 July 2019 (BBC iPlayer); 22 July 2019 (TV)
Dani Dyer becomes Rattus's political advisor as we look at everything from the birth of democracy to Margaret Thatcher having to change her voice so she would be taken more seriously. Songs: "Mambo No. 10" (parody of "Mambo No. 5" by Pérez Prado) "The History of Democracy" (parody of "Common People" by Pulp); Sketches: The birth of democracy in ancient Greece means equal rights for all citizens in Athens - with a few exceptions of children, foreigners, slaves, women and homeless people. Oliver Cromwell can't make up his mind about what they should do with the captured King Charles I. The Speaker's chair used to have a special feature for especially long-running debates. Spencer Perceval's PR team work hard to come up with some fittingly historic final words for him to utter after he becomes the first (and only) prime minister to be shot. The rulers of Europe divide Africa between themselves in not the most civilised and dignified manner possible. Mahatma Gandhi tells the viewer about his hunger strike in protest of the British occupation of India. A group of women struggle to hear and see the debate in the House of Commons from the Ladies' Gallery. Suffragette Emily Davison hides in the Houses of Parliament to enact a special plan. Margaret Thatcher has to change her voice in a bid to be taken more seriously in her political career.
809	"Heroic Home Front"	Unknown	9 September 2019 (BBC iPlayer); 16 September 2019 (TV)
A look at how World War II played out on the home front, featuring Churchill's secret loo, the heroic "ATA Girls" and German spies being caught out by their delicious sausages. Songs: "GIs Have It" (parody of "Legend Has It" by Run the Jewels) "VE Day" (parody of "September" by Earth, Wind & Fire); Sketches: After the declaration of war, panicked measures are taken at home to prepare for a not-so-imminent Nazi invasion. A group of overly-polite British soldiers delay their own rescue. The Nazis carefully orchestrate Operation Sea Lion to avoid damaging places in the UK that they have previously been to on holiday. We see how the blackout during the Blitz affected everyday life. Advertisement for required-by-law gas masks. King George VI and Queen Elizabeth refuse to leave Buckingham Palace while London is being bombed, despite being advised to head to Canada by their staff. We meet the "ATA Girls", the heroic women of the Air Transport Auxiliary led by Pauline Gower. A group of women relaxing after work trade horror stories about their work conditions (parody of Four Yorkshiremen sketch). Two less-than-inconspicuous German spies try to sneak their way into Britain. A woman reads a heavily censored letter from her soldier sweetheart. Winston Churchill holds conversations with American President Roosevelt in his secret loo.
810	"Fierce Females"	Unknown	8 March 2020 (BBC iPlayer); 8 March 2020 (TV)
Ancient wonder women, a Spartan queen on Historical Love Island and the Tudor Queens sing! Song: "Tudor Queens: Power" (parody of "Power" by Little Mix ft. Stormzy); Sketches: The very first Wonder Woman, Wonder Scythian, is a lot boozier and flightier than her modern-day counterpart. The director of "Joan of Arc - the Movie" isn't impressed with her less-than-bombastic demeanour. Cleopatra goes to "Historical First Dates" in an attempt to find a husband who isn't related to her. Queen Marie Antoinette shows off her outrageous fashion and frivolous spending on social media. The modern man who chooses Gorgo, Queen of Sparta on "Historical Love Island" is shocked when he finds out about Ancient Spartan marriage customs. (with special guest Iain Stirling); The suffragettes and suffragists have a riff off (parody of the Pitch Perfect franchise and has parodies of "Blank Space" by Taylor Swift, "Shout Out To My Ex" by Little Mix and "Ice Ice Baby" by Vanilla Ice). A 1930s American woman applies to be a Hello Girl. A man disguises himself to learn the secrets of midwifery in "Don't Call the Tudor Midwife" (parody of Call the Midwife). With their brother Edward VI on his deathbed, Princess Mary and Princess Elizabeth argue about who will be queen.
811	"Outrageous Olympics"	Unknown	17 July 2020 (BBC iPlayer); 23 July 2021 (TV)
Alex Scott guests as Mary Queen of Scots plays grief-golf & Henry VIII sings Get Sweaty'; Song: "Henry VIII: Get Sweaty" (parody of "Get Lucky" by Daft Punk), performed by Tom Stourton with James McNicholas; Sketches: In 776 BC, the ancient Greeks try and liven up their Zeus festival, thus creating the dawn of the Olympics. Some German monks get caught playing kegels but convince the Abbott they are training to defeat the Devil. "The Puritan Games 1654" Oliver Cromwell has banned sport as it is a frivolous activity. King Henry VIII has forced every man under 40 to practice archery and shenanigans ensue. Mary Queen Of Scots plays golf just three days after her husbands' death "Tekktube" video explaining the differences between modern and medieval football (parody of the F2 Freestylers). Two chariot engineers in ancient Rome talk their driver, Lewis Hamiltanious over the safety checks. Gustav Zander explains his new work-out routine. Baron de Coubertin has reinstated the Olympics in 1896 and is deciding what events will take place. "Historical Educating" Class 7B is in need of two new teachers but Victorian cricketer W. G. Grace is here to save the day. World War I soldiers plan their strategy for going over the top using football metaphors.
812	"Mayflower Malarkey"	Unknown	14 September 2020 (BBC iPlayer); 14 September 2020 (TV)
Washington, Jefferson, Queen Elizabeth I, social media sensation Zack Septic-Tank and a host of plucky Puritans star in a show marking 400 years since the Mayflower's famous voyage. Song: "F-F-F-Founding Fathers" (parody of generic pop/boyband); Sketches: "America: Who Really Discovered the Continent?" (film trailer); John Cabot keeps his social media followers fresh with his voyage to America - and more importantly, massive fish. Elizabeth I is not happy that her own colony, Roanoke, has disappeared! HHTV News: Puritans set sail to the New World on the Mayflower when the first boat sinks. Mayflower Cruises: The one-way journey of a lifetime abroad the Mayflower (advertisement). On board the Mayflower voyage, Puritans set out their plans for the New World - but will things be better? The origins of Thanksgiving, as two Pilgrim Fathers meet their Native Americans neighbours. Puritan mums have a discussion about baby names. GameTube: Zack Septic-Tank plays through the Boston Tea Party and starts a war (parody of Jacksepticeye). George Washington rallies his troops and reminds them which side they're on. Writing his Declaration of Independence, things get awkward between Thomas Jefferson and his slaves. "Historical Design": Sophie and Sebastian drop in to think up a title for America's new leader.
813	"Holly H Song Special"	Unknown	20 July 2020 (BBC iPlayer); 20 July 2020 (TV)
Savage Songs: Social media star Holly H is Rattus' guest on his radio station, BBC Radio Number Two. "Tudor Queens: Power" (from S08E10), "We're Grateful" (from S08E06), "The Romantic Poets" (from S08E03), "Mambo No. 10" (from S08E08), "GIs Have It" (from S08E09), "Court Me Maybe" (from S08E04), "Founding Fathers" (from S08E12), "The Moving Picture Show" (from S08E01)
814	"Fantastic Firsts"	Unknown	27 July 2020 (BBC iPlayer); 27 July 2020 (TV)
A special show featuring some of history's greatest firsts. Songs: "King Tut's Haul" (from S08E02) "The Earth Spins Round the Sun", "Flying to the Moon" (from S08E07) Sketches: Emporio Anubis presents Fat-Head, the Egyptian perfumed wax cone that's placed on your head and melts throughout the day (advertisement) (from S08E02). The world's very first library, the Library of Alexandria, opens to the public for a one-off. But does it have funny cat pictures? Historical PR: Sophie and Sebastian help excite the ancient Festival of Zeus by turning into the Olympics (from S08E11). "America: Who Really Discovered the Continent?" (film trailer) (from S08E12); John Cabot keeps his social media followers fresh with his voyage to America - and more importantly, massive fish (from S08E12). The keeper of Elizabeth I's menagerie suggests that maybe the various exotic animals in it are starting to outgrow the Tower of London (from S08E06). Two Macaronis compare outfits before finding out their third compatriot has changed his style (from S08E02). A Public Service Broadcast For Ladies is taken over by some first female pilots, on account of the sexism not being true.
815	"Beastly Bodily Functions"	Unknown	3 August 2020 (BBC iPlayer); 3 August 2020 (TV)
Doctors Chris and Xand van Tulleken join Rattus for a selection of old and new sketches relating to bodies. Song: "Henry VIII: Get Sweaty" (from S08E11); Sketches: Three cavemen make a video where they take on the Cow Milk Challenge (from S08E06). Yummy Planet: Charles Darwin tries to resist eating the animals on his nature programme (from S08E6). "Viking Eye for a Saxon Guy": Two vikings glam up a Saxon peasant (from S08E02). There's a new trend at the court of Elizabeth I: looking exactly like the queen (from S08E02). Victorian pro-beard activists barge into a barbers shop in an attempt to save another beard. Zander advertises his Amazing Steam-Powered Exercise Machines, the Victorian equivalent of today's gyms, but with even more clothes on. A man desperate not to be rude in front of the Roman Emperor dies in a rather unusual way (from S08E04). Paulina Pepys is grateful to her brother Samuel when he offers a roof over her head, at least until she learns about the conditions (from S08E05). Winston Churchill holds conversations with American president Roosevelt in his secret loo (from S08E09). The Apollo 10 crew is faced with the horror of someone's poo floating around in the cockpit (from S08E07).

=== Series 9 (2021–2022) ===
The ninth series began with 3 episodes presented predominantly through animation, with subsequent episodes in a more regular format following in late 2021.

No.	Title	Written by	Original release date
1	"British Black History"	Unknown	7 May 2021
Song: "Sons of Africa" "Ira Aldridge" "Black People Played Their Part"; Sketches: In a recruitment film, an African soldier guarding Hadrian’s Wall is still getting used to British weather (advert); The new Archbishop of Canterbury learns he wasn't the first choice for the role (animated); Jaques Francis is employed to dive and recover parts of the Mary Rose (animated); John Hawkins practices his pitch on the Slave Trade to one of Elizabeth I's courtiers (animated); A couple of MPs realize they aren't the only ones skipping the 1796 abolition vote, to visit the opera The first black boxing star, Bill Richmond, is the star of Georgian Hello Magazine; Writergram: Phillis Wheatley has a hard time reassuring fans that she wrote her book Mary Seacole (music video, from S04E05); Mary Seacole is left out of the planning for her aid festival, and she has some skepticism (animated) Even The Blitz cannot dampen Lillian Bader's happiness after getting wed during the war
2	"Gruesome Guide to Growing Up"	Unknown	7 July 2021
3	"Protesting with Pankhurst"	Unknown	20 August 2021
Featuring Emmeline Pankhurst
4	"Precious Planet"	Unknown	12 November 2021
Featuring Charles Darwin
5	"Dastardly Dance"	Unknown	26 November 2021
Featuring Shirley Ballas
6	"Cracking Christmas"	Unknown	10 December 2021
7	"Foul Feasting"	Unknown	7 January 2022
8	"Infectious Influencers"	Unknown	14 January 2022
9	"Banging Bling"	Unknown	21 January 2022
10	"Diabolical Daily Life"	Unknown	28 January 2022
11	"Monstrous Myths"	Unknown	4 February 2022
12	"Henry and Liz’s Family Face-Off"	Unknown	11 February 2022
13	"Cursed Careers"	Unknown	18 February 2022
14	"Smash Hit Songs"	Unknown	25 February 2022
15	"BBC’s Big Birthday Bonanza!"	Unknown	15 October 2022

=== Series 10 (2023–2024) ===
The tenth series began with a Father's Day special in 2023.

No.	Title	Written by	Original release date
1	"Daft Dads"	Unknown	16 June 2023
2	"NHS 75th Birthday"	Unknown	5 July 2023
3	"Foul Football"	Unknown	19 July 2023
4	"Gruesome Gunpower Plot"	Unknown	1 November 2023
5	"Hideous Homes"	Unknown	2 February 2024
6	"Ruinous Rivals"	Unknown	9 February 2024
7	"Radical Renaissance"	Unknown	16 February 2024
8	"Gory Greek Myths"	Unknown	23 February 2024
9	"The Chaotic Civil War"	Unknown	1 March 2024
10	"Bewitching Books"	Unknown	7 March 2024
11	"Terrifying Tower of London"	Unknown	16 April 2024
12	"Rotten Romans in Britain"	Unknown	26 April 2024
13	"Loo Man's Gross Guide"	Unknown	3 May 2024
14	"Songtastic Musical Special"	Unknown	10 May 2024
15	"Kings and Queens - A Right Royal Special"	Unknown	14 June 2024

=== Special (2023) ===
No.	Title	Written by	Original release date
1	"'Orrible Opera"	Unknown	8 September 2023
73 min special.

=== Series 11 (2025) ===
The eleventh series began in 2025.

No.	Title	Written by	Original release date
1	"Brilliant Brains"	Unknown	7 February 2025
Song: "Esperanto" (parody of "Despacito" by Luis Fonsi and Daddy Yankee) "Blinded by Insights (Hildegard von Bingen)" (parody of "Blinding Lights" by the Weeknd); Sketches:
2	"Ridiculous Rules"	Unknown	14 February 2025
Song: "Hard Cops Life" (parody of "Hard Knock Life (Ghetto Anthem)" by Jay-Z) "Rosa May Billinghurst: The Musical" (parody of "This Is Me (The Greatest Showman song)" and "Never Enough (The Greatest Showman song)" from The Greatest Showman); Sketches:
3	"Ludicrous Landmarks"	Unknown	21 February 2025
Song: "Seven Wonders of the Ancient World" (parody of "Seven Nation Army" by The White Stripes); Sketches:
4	"Terrible Transport"	Unknown	28 February 2025
Song: "Taking Flight" (parody of "Shake It Off" by Taylor Swift); Sketches:
5	"Twisted Technology"	Unknown	7 March 2025
Song: "Smells Like A Phonograph (Thomas Edison)" (parody of "Smells Like Teen Spirit" by Nirvana); Sketches:
6	"Enormous Empires"	Unknown	14 March 2025
Song: "Empires Rise and Empires Fall"; Sketches:
7	"Monstrous Mothers"	Unknown	28 March 2025
Song: "Eleanor of Aquitaine" (parody of "Crazy In Love" by Beyoncé) "Hey Ma" (parody of "Hey Ya" by Outkast); Sketches:
8	"Rat-O-Vision Song Contest"	Unknown	16 May 2025
Savage Songs: Rattus hosts the first ever Rat-O-Vision Song Contest. America: "Smells Like A Phonograph (Thomas Edison)" (from S11E05), Germany: "Blinded by Insights (Hildegard von Bingen)" (from S11E01), Poland: "Esperanto" (from S11E01), Italy: "Renaissance" (from S10E07), Greece: "Sky Full of Myths" (from S10E08), England: "No Pope" (from S10E04), Spain: "You and Me, a Rivalry" (from S10E06), France: "Eleanor of Aquitaine" (from S11E07), Egypt: "Pharaoh's Paradise"
9	"Putrid Pirates and Salty Seadogs"	Unknown	7 November 2025
10	"The Roaring 1920s!"	Unknown	14 November 2025
11	"Hair-raising Holiday"	Unknown	21 November 2025
12	"Barmy Battles Special"	Unknown	28 November 2025
13	"Phiendish Pharaohs"	Unknown	5 December 2025
14	"Top Ten Naughtiest People"	Unknown	12 December 2025
15	"Pitiful Princes and Princesses"	Unknown	19 December 2025

== See also ==
- List of Horrible Histories (2009 TV series) episodes
