= Joe Elliott (disambiguation) =

Joe Elliott (born 1959) is an English musician, primarily known as the lead singer of Def Leppard.

Joe or Joseph Elliott may also refer to:

- Joe Elliott (footballer), English footballer
- Julian Elliott (born 1955), known as Joe, academic, psychologist, and principal of Collingwood College, Durham
- Joseph Elliott (actor) (born 1986), British children's author, scriptwriter and actor
- Joey Elliott (born 1986), American football player
- Joe Elliot (television producer), British children's television producer and writer.
