= The Curse of King Tut's Tomb =

The Curse of King Tut's Tomb may refer to:

- The Curse of King Tut's Tomb (1980 film), a film directed by Philip Leacock
- The Curse of King Tut's Tomb (2006 film), a film directed by Russell Mulcahy
