= Brendan Patricks =

British actor and magician

- Born: 3 December 1980 (age 45); Reading, Berkshire, England
- Education: Maiden Erlegh School; University of Hull; LAMDA
- Years active: 2006-present
- Website: brendanpatricks.com workingmagic.co.uk

Brendan Patricks (born 3 December 1980) is a British actor and London magician from Reading, England. He is well known for the roles of Evelyn Napier in Downton Abbey and Henry Hampshire in Rivals as well as playing other significant roles in TV series including Gentleman Jack, Blackmere, Doctor Who, Gavin and Stacey, Mr. Sloane, Grace and Devils. He also voiced Orbeck of Vinheim in Dark Souls 3

Patricks was born in Reading to an Irish father and English mother. While in Reading, he was a member of Progress Theatre. He attended the University of Hull before training at the London Academy of Music and Dramatic Art. Besides acting, he was in a magic double act with comedian Nick Mohammed.

After graduating from drama school he made his stage debut as Captain Stanhope in Journey's End (West End 2004) followed by his TV debut in The Curse of King Tut's Tomb.

== Filmography ==
=== Film ===
Year	Title	Role	Notes
2006	The Curse of King Tut's Tomb	Brian Eastcliff	Television film
2006	The Magic Flute	Papageno's Jailor	
2006	Heroes and Villains	Nick	
2007	Sherlock Holmes and the Baker Street Irregulars	Inspector Burrows	Television film
2009	My Last Five Girlfriends	Duncan	
2009	The Capgras Tide	Henry	Short film
2010	Afterspace	Danny	Short film
2010	Three Wise Women	Bobby	Television film
2014	GameFace	Jon	Television film
2016	Grimsby	Reporter	Uncredited
2017	Madame	Toby	
2019	The Professor and the Madman	Winston Churchill	
2021	Resurrection	Marius	
2022	The Ghost Writer	Patrick	

=== Television ===
Year	Title	Role	Notes
2007	Gavin & Stacey	Magician	Episode: "Series 1, Episode 4"
2008	The Bill	Graham Boyd	Episode: "Blood Rush: Part 2"
2008	Casualty	Mr Graham Ireland	Episode: "Paradise Lost"
2009	Horne & Corden		Recurring role; 4 episodes
2010–2015	Downton Abbey	Evelyn Napier	Recurring role; 7 episodes
2011	The Legend of Dick and Dom	Barry Fongo	Episode: "The Magic Oblong"
2011	Pete versus Life	Jed	Episode: "The Tennis Player"
2013	Blandings	Lord Heacham	Episode: "Pig-Hoo-o-o-o-ey"
2013	Doctor Who	Edmund / Mr Thursday	Episode: "The Crimson Horror"
2013	Family Tree	Young Father	Episode: "The Austerity Games"
2013	Skins	Stibbard	Episode: "Fire: Part 1"
2013	The Wrong Mans	Ed	Episode: "Dead Mans"
2014	Mr. Sloane	Reggie	Series regular; 6 episodes
2014	Comedy Feeds	Mr. Whelan	Episode: "Parents Evening"
2014	Bad Education	Orlando	Episode: "After School Clubs"
2014–2016	In the Club	Chris Bellingham	Recurring role; 7 episodes
2015	A.D. The Bible Continues	Marius	Miniseries; 4 episodes
2016	Outlander	Captain Clermont	Episode: "Vengeance Is Mine"
2017	Fearless	DCI Nicholas Staines	Miniseries; 5 episodes
2017	Josh	Chris	Episode: "Friends & Rivals"
2018	Kiri	Paul	Miniseries; 2 episodes
2018	Endeavour	Singleton	Episode: "Quartet"
2019	Traitors	Sullivan MI5	Recurring role; 4 episodes
2019	Gentleman Jack	Reverend Thomas Ainsworth	Episode: "Let's Have Another Look at Your Past Perfect"
2020	Breeders	Justin	Episode: "No Honeymoon"
2022	Devils	Anthony Ellams	Recurring role; 4 episodes
2022	The Flatshare	Host	Episode: "The Beginning"
2023	Entitled	Aston	Series regular; 8 episodes
2024	Grace	Graham True / Cedric Mervielle	Episode: "Want You Dead"
2024	Rivals	Henry Hampshire	
