= Swashbuckle (TV series) =

British television series

- Presented by: Gemma Hunt
- Opening theme: Swashbuckle
- Country of origin: United Kingdom
- Original language: English
- No. of seasons: 8
- No. of episodes: 208

Production
- Executive producers: Tony Reed (series 1); Vanessa Amberleigh (series 2–5); Sid Cole (series 6); Yvonne Jennings (series 7-8)
- Production locations: MediaCityUK, Greater Manchester, England
- Running time: 22 minutes
- Production companies: BBC In-House Children's Production; BBC Children's Productions; BBC Studios Kids & Family

Original release
- Network: CBeebies
- Release: 6 July 2013 – 10 July 2022

Swashbuckle is a television show on CBeebies aimed at young children which started airing on 6 July 2013. The show takes the format of a game show where children control a group of pirates. The show is one of CBeebies's most watched shows. It won the 2015 British Academy Children's Awards for Entertainment and was nominated in 2018.

== Format ==
The show takes place on the site of the shipwreck of the Scarlet Squid, in which three "naughty pirates" – a captain and her hapless shipmates – have stolen and hidden Gem's five jewels. Four children (known as Swashbucklers) compete in a series of games to try to win back the jewels, under the watchful eye of the ship's parrot Squawk. After two games, any remaining jewels are hunted against the clock as the children try to find them hidden within the shipwreck.

If the children successfully retrieve all of the jewels then a wheel is spun to determine which of the three pirates must walk the plank into the gunge-filled Ship's Mess. The children do not win in every episode, however.

Since Series 5, there was a new section added to the wheel with 3 hats on it, known as the “Triple Slop Drop”. If it lands on there, then all 3 pirates must walk the plank.

== Main characters ==
Character	Actor	Seasons							
Character	Actor	1	2	3	4	5	6	7	8
Gem	Gemma Hunt	Main	Main	Main	Main	Main	Main	Main	Main
Squawk	Conor McNamara	Main	Main	Main	Main	Main	Main	Main	Main
Captain Sinker	Ella Kenion	Main	Main	Main	Recurring				
Cook	Joseph Elliot	Main	Main	Main	Main	Main	Main		
Line	Richard David-Caine	Main	Main	Main	Main	Main	Main		
Captain Captain	Jennie Dale				Main	Main		Main	Main
Captain HeyHo	Sophia Nomvete						Main		
Sandy Toes	Ian Kirkby							Main	Main
Seaweed	Tyler Collins							Main	Main

== Cast ==
=== Presenters ===
- Gem – Gemma Hunt (series 1-8)
- Squawk – Conor McNamara (series 1-8)

=== Pirate captains ===
- Captain Sinker − Ella Kenion (series 1-4)
- Captain Captain − Jennie Dale (series 4-5, 7-8)
- Captain HeyHo − Sophia Nomvete (series 6)

=== Pirates ===
- Cook – Joseph Elliott (series 1-6)
- Line – Richard David-Caine (series 1-6)
- Sandy Toes – Ian Kirkby (series 7-8)
- Seaweed – Tyler Collins (series 7-8)

== Awards and nominations ==
Swashbuckle won the 2015 British Academy of Film and Television Arts award for Children's Entertainment and was nominated for that award, but did not win, in 2018.
