= Joseph Elliott (actor) =

British author, scriptwriter, and actor

- Born: Joseph Elliott; November 28, 1986 (age 39); Bristol, England, United Kingdom
- Education: University of Manchester (BA) Central School of Speech and Drama (MA)
- Occupations: Actor author scriptwriter
- Years active: 2013–present
- Website: www.joseph-elliott.net

Joseph Elliott (born 28 November 1986) is a British children's author, scriptwriter and actor. Between 2013 and 2019 he played the pirate Cook in the BAFTA-winning CBeebies television series Swashbuckle. He is also the creator of the critically acclaimed Shadow Skye fantasy trilogy.

== Early life and education ==
Elliott was born in Bristol, England, on 28 November 1986. He attended the University of Manchester, where he studied English literature and Drama. He then completed a Master of Arts degree in performance at the Central School of Speech and Drama.

== Career ==
=== Television and acting ===
From 2013 to 2019 Elliott starred as the pirate Cook alongside Richard David-Caine in 90 episodes of the CBeebies series Swashbuckle.

In 2020 Elliott co-created, wrote and starred in Big Fat Like, a BBC comedy sketch show that satirises YouTube. He has also served as a scriptwriter for several television programmes including Horrible Histories, Class Dismissed, and The Amelia Gething Complex.

=== Literary career ===
In 2020 Walker Books published his debut fantasy novel, The Good Hawk, which was the first installment of the Shadow Skye trilogy. The book features a protagonist with Down syndrome and was shortlisted for the 2021 Carnegie Medal and the Branford Boase Award.

He followed the debut with two sequels, The Broken Raven in 2021 and The Burning Swift in 2022. In 2024 Elliott transitioned into middle-grade comedy fiction with the release of Nora and the Map of Mayhem, followed by Nora and the Compass of Chaos in 2025.

== Personal life ==
Elliott enjoys pottery, snorkelling and playing board games in his spare time.

== Bibliography ==
=== The Shadow Skye Trilogy ===
- The Good Hawk (2020)
- The Broken Raven (2021)
- The Burning Swift (2022)

=== The Nora Series ===
- Nora and the Map of Mayhem (2024)
- Nora and the Compass of Chaos (2025)

== Filmography ==
Year	Title	Role	Notes
2013–2019	Swashbuckle	Cook	Actor & Scriptwriter
2019–2021	The Amelia Gething Complex	—	Scriptwriter
2020	Big Fat Like	—	Co-creator writer, and actor
2020–present	Horrible Histories	—	Scriptwriter
