= Horrible Histories (2015 TV series) =

British sketch comedy children's television series

- Logo used for Series 6 and "The Specials II"
- Genre: Comedy
- Based on: Horrible Histories by Terry Deary
- Written by: Ben Ward; Lucy Clarke; Dave Cohen; Susie Donkin; Steve Punt; George Sawyer; Laurence Rickard; Gerard Foster; Colin Swash; Howard Read; Jack Bernhardt; Danny Peak; Sarah Morgan; Claire Wetton; Ben Partridge
- Directed by: Steve Connelly (S7-8); Simon Gibney (S6); Ian Curtis (S6-7); Gordon Anderson (S9); Paul Taylor (S10-11); Cein McGillicuddy (S10-11)
- Starring: Simon Farnaby (S6); Jim Howick (S6); Dominique Moore; Jessica Ransom (S6-11); Tom Stourton (S6-11); Richard David-Caine (S7-11); James McNicholas (S7-11); Jalaal Hartley (S6-8); Ryan Sampson (S7); Gemma Whelan (S7); Harrie Hayes (S8-11); Emily Lloyd-Saini (S8-11); Ethan Lawrence (S9-11); Paul G Raymond (S9-11); Timmika Ramsay (S9-11); Inel Tomlinson (S10-11); Naz Osmanoglu (S6); Adam Riches (S6); Michael Abubakar (S8); Divian Ladwa (S9); Puppeteers: John Eccleston (S1-8); Scott Brooker (Puppet Wrangler) (S6-11); Davie Chapman (S9-11)
- Voices of: Jon Culshaw (S6-11)
- Theme music composer: Richie Webb & Matt Katz
- Composer: Richie Webb
- Country of origin: United Kingdom
- Original language: English
- No. of series: 6 + Specials
- No. of episodes: 90 regular episodes, 3 special episodes, 1 full-length special (list of episodes)

Production
- Executive producers: For Lion Television: Richard Bradley (S6-11); Bill Hobbins (S6); Simon Welton (S7-11); For CBBC: Melissa Hardinge (S6-11)
- Producers: Lisa Mitchell (S7); Matt Lamont (S8-9); Caroline Fisher (S10-11)
- Editors: Nigel Williams; Mike Holliday; Will Peverett; Peter Oliver; Adam Windmill; Will Porter; Garry Smith; Duncan O'Neill; Scott Edwards
- Running time: 30 minutes
- Production company: Lion Television

Original release
- Network: CBBC
- Release: 7 February 2015 – present

Related
- Horrible Histories

Horrible Histories is a 2015 reboot of the 2009 television series of the same name; based on the bestselling book series by Terry Deary; featuring a new format, cast and production team. The show is produced for CBBC by Lion Television.

Over the years, the show has featured a large ensemble cast. Current cast members include Tom Stourton, Jessica Ransom, Richard David-Caine, James McNicholas, Emily Lloyd-Saini; among many others. It has also attracted an impressive list of celebrity guest stars, including, among others, Rowan Atkinson, Gemma Whelan, Sanjeev Bhaskar and Rob Delaney.

In 2024, Horrible Histories was presented with a BAFTA Special Award. The honour was awarded in recognition of Horrible Histories’ extraordinary cultural and social impact.

A spin off, Horrible Science, started airing in 2025; being the second series of that name after the 2015 CITV series.

== History ==
In 2014, CBBC executives announced that, owing to the critical and popular success of the original, discussions were underway regarding some form of return. Original series star Mathew Baynton subsequently confirmed that he and the other five members of the starring cast would not be reuniting as a team for the new project.

The resulting series, while sharing the same core concept, genre and sensibilities as its predecessor—including an original parody song in each episode—follows a notably different format. In lieu of the previous short, unconnected sketches from randomly-selected time periods, the new series consists of specials focusing on the specific life and times of one prominent historical figure. It will also involve a largely all-new production team and cast, while still retaining Greg Jenner as lead historical consultant and many of the original series's writers. In addition, original stars Sarah Hadland, Simon Farnaby, Lawry Lewin, Dominique Moore, Katherine Jakeways, Giles Terera and Jim Howick returned in limited roles, with Farnaby in particular reprising his role as Death. Javone Prince and Terry Deary returned in Series 8; Prince also appeared in Series 9. Minor Series 4 actors Jessica Ransom and Jalaal Hartley took on more central roles. Several prominent UK comedy veterans, including Lorna Watson, Ben Miller, Kathryn Drysdale, Kevin Eldon, Tom Rosenthal and Rowan Atkinson, guest-starred as the spotlighted figures.

In February 2015, the new series debuted with an episode drawing on the events leading up to the signing of Magna Carta, timed to coincide with the BBC's larger commemoration of the document's 800-year anniversary before being followed by a run of fourteen episodes. 2016 saw the broadcast of three specials to mark certain events throughout that year: 400 years since Shakespeare died, the BBC's "Love to Read" campaign, and 350 years since the Great Fire of London. There was a slight change in cast where the main stars Jalaal Hartley, Tom Stourton and Jessica Ransom continued with some of the supporting cast, while a number of the sixth series cast, including the two original members Jim Howick and Simon Farnaby were absent.

A full-length seventh series was aired every Monday on CBBC from June 2017, and it continued into 2018. Hartley, Ransom and Stourton continue alongside Gemma Whelan and Richard David-Caine who stayed on from the 2016 specials; Ryan Sampson now makes up the sixth main cast member. This time, Series 7 focuses each episode on a theme, e.g. music, explorers, medicine, presidents etc. The format is very much the same with recurring sketches, a song or two each episode (with the main songs now placed at the end of each episode, except for Ruthless Rulers and Series 8's Mind Your Manners), animated characters in-between sketches and quiz questions asked by various historical figures. One notable difference is that of host Rattus Rattus, who has his own storyline based on the theme of the episode and is appearing in many different costumes. Guest-stars include Sanjeev Bhaskar with various roles, as he did in Series 6, and First Dates host Fred Sirieix who appears for 'Historical First Dates' sketches to host.

An eighth series began filming in September 2018, and began airing on 3 June 2019 on CBBC, with a similar concept to Series 7 (each episode focusing on a theme) whilst also occasionally featuring guest co-hosts. The series had two special episodes: the first one being Football with Alex Scott, a special where guest star footballer Alex Scott appeared and hosted her own episode and recounted skits in the show about football from seasons from the original 2009 Horrible Histories show and the sixth season of the 2015 reboot. The second special episode was aired on CBBC on 15 August 2019 – guest star, actress and comedian Emily Atack hosted her own episode called Back to School with Emily Atack. The episode consisted of her recounting skits from the original 2009 Horrible Histories and the 2015 reboot's seventh season relating to school and education.

On 19 December 2019, It was announced that the remaining episodes of series 8 will air during 2020, however a new ninth series will also be set to air sometime in the year.

In October 2022, a special episode about the history of the BBC was shown to celebrate the corporation's 100th anniversary.

== Cast ==
Further information see: List of Horrible Histories cast members

These are the cast who have appeared in all or most of the episodes:

Starring Actor	Roles (recurring only)
Richard Atwill (2016 Specials)	Gabriel Spenser (2016 Specials), Robert Hooke (2016 Specials), John Shakespeare (2016 Specials)
Richard David-Caine (2016 Specials – present)	James I of England (Series 9 - Present), Abraham Lincoln, St. Valentine, Horatio Nelson, Gioachino Rossini, Peter Freuchen, Guy Fawkes, Salvador Dalí, Raphael, Ismail ibn Hammad al-Jauhari, Walter Raleigh, James Cook, Eric XIV of Sweden, Rasputin, Vishnu Sharma, Karl Marx, Thomas Farriner, Robert Boyle, Leon Trotsky, Walter Ulbricht, Charles-François Félix, John Harvey Kellogg, Louis Pasteur, Thorkell the Tall, William Nightingale, Tsar Peter III
Simon Farnaby (Series 6)	Death, George III (Series 6), Gebhard Leberecht von Blücher (Series 6), Benjamin Disraeli (Series 6)
Jalaal Hartley (Series 6 – Series 8)	Charles II of England, James I of England (2016 Specials - Series 7), Daniel Steibelt, William Gladstone (Series 7), Douglas Bader, Matthew Hopkins, Winston Churchill (Series 7 – Series 8), Thomas Cromwell, Charles Dickens, Thomas Jefferson, Philip II of Spain, Ernest Shackleton, Ptolemy XII Auletes, Caligula, Asser, Æthelberht, King of Wessex, Francis Walsingham, Ivan the Terrible, Vladimir Lenin, Christopher Columbus, Jackson Pollock, René Magritte, Orville Wright, Joseph Stalin (Series 6), John Cage, C. Auguste Dupin, Christopher Marlowe, Donatello, John Logie Baird, Alexander Fleming, Isambard Kingdom Brunel, Pierre Curie, Claudius, Henry II (Series 7)
Harrie Hayes (Series 8-present)	Elizabeth I of England, Marie Antoinette, Charlotte Brontë, Catherine Dickens (Series 8 – present)
Jim Howick (Series 6)	George IV of the United Kingdom (Series 6), Napoleon Bonaparte (Series 6), Winston Churchill (Series 6), Mr. H, host of "History's Craziest Fools"
Samson Kayo (Series 7)	Jimi Hendrix, Chris Ofili, Martin Luther King Jr., Barack Obama, George Crum, Shaka Zulu
Naz Osmanoglu (Series 6)	Henry II of England (Series 6), Thomas Wolsey (Series 6), Nero (Series 6), Octavian (Series 6), Ptolemy XIII Theos Philopator (Series 6), Æthelstan of Kent (Series 6), Charles the Fat (Series 6), Saladin (Series 6), Suleiman the Magnificent (Series 6), Prince Albert (Series 6), Francis II of France (Series 6), Chris Staycalmer
Jessica Ransom (Series 6 – present)	Mary, Queen of Scots, Queen Victoria (Series 8 – present), Cleopatra (Series 7 – present), Hedy Lamarr, Bridget Holmes, Florence Nightingale, Empress Renxiaowen (Series 9 – Present), Eleanor Roosevelt, Grace Bedell, Catherine of Aragon, Catherine Parr, Frida Kahlo, Princess Augusta of Saxe-Gotha, Clementine Churchill, NoMerit Vynall, Elizabeth Cromwell, Anne Hathaway (wife of Shakespeare), Beatrix Potter, Mary Shelley, Margaret Nicholson, George Eliot, Barbara Hepworth, Anne Brontë, Joan of Arc, Eve Curie, Catherine the Great, Pauline Bonaparte, Maria Amalia, Madame de Pompadour
Adam Riches (Series 6)	Geoff Reason, Julius Caesar (Series 6), Host of "Historical Grand Designs" (Series 6), Richard I of England (Series 6), Æthelwulf, King of Wessex (Series 6), Henry VII of England (Series 6), Charles I of England (Series 6), Pope Stephen VI (Series 6), Edward the Confessor (Series 6), Edward Jenner (Series 6), Arthur Wellesley, 1st Duke of Wellington (Series 6)
Ryan Sampson (Series 7)	Joseph Stalin (Series 7), Wolfgang Amadeus Mozart (Series 7), Nero (Series 7), Simon Cowell (Series 7), Francis Drake (Series 7), Frederick, Prince of Wales (Series 7), Louis XVI (Series 7), William Clark (Series 7), Phidias (Series 7), Pablo Picasso (Series 7), Andy Warhol (Series 7), Rameses the Great (Series 7), Al Capone (Series 7), Steve Biceps (parody of Steve Backshall), Buzz Aldrin (Series 7), Thomas A. Watson (Series 7), Charles Babbage (Series 7), Benjamin Franklin (Series 7), Napoleon Bonaparte (Series 7), Theodore Roosevelt (Series 7), John F. Kennedy (Series 7), Ronald Reagan (Series 7), Vlad the Impaler (Series 7), Charles I of England (Series 7), Francis, Duke of Anjou (Series 7), Louis XIV (Series 7), Xerxes the Great (Series 7), Michelangelo (Series 7), Vincent van Gogh (Series 7), Nikita Khrushchev (Series 7), Edward Jenner (Series 7), John, King of England (Series 7), Henry Richardson Labouisse Jr. (Season 7), Gonzalo Pizarro (Series 7)
Tom Stourton (Series 6 – present)	Raynald of Châtillon, Edward Coke, Æthelred I, King of Wessex, Harold Godwinson, John Harrington, Tycho Brahe, Mark Antony, George Washington, Catus Decianus, Adrian Carton de Wiart, Sir Thomas Fairfax, William Shakespeare, D. H. Lawrence, Roald Dahl, Sherlock Holmes, Samuel Pepys, Ludwig van Beethoven, Elvis Presley, Meriwether Lewis, Leif Erikson, (Series 7 – Present) Yongle Emperor, Zhang Fu, Oboi (Series 9 — present), John Davis, Henry VIII (Series 7 – present), Nicholas II, Giacomo Casanova, Leonardo da Vinci, Swill Gumbitz, Joshua Reynolds, Rembrandt, Neil Armstrong, Prince William, Duke of Cumberland, Roderick Maclean, Johannes Gutenberg, Wilbur Wright, Alexander Graham Bell, George Washington, George III (Series 7 – present), Jefferson Davis, Franklin D. Roosevelt, Robert Dudley, Attila the Hun, Canute the Great, Lord Cardigan, Maxim Gorky, St. Jerome, Richard the Lionheart, Frédéric Joliot-Curie, George V, Captain Robert Falcon Scott
Thom Tuck (2016 Specials)	Ben Jonson (2016 Specials), Lewis Carroll (2016 Specials), Alfred, Lord Tennyson (2016 Specials), Branwell Brontë (2016 Specials)
Mike Wozniak (Series 8)	Wilhelm II of Germany
Gemma Whelan (2016 Specials – Series 8)	Enid Blyton, Emily Brontë, Gertrude Bell, Lucy Walker, Amy Johnson, Anne Boleyn, Josephine Bonaparte (Series 7), Anne of Cleves, Vigée Le Brun, Mona Lisa, Lisa del Giocondo, Nefertari, Hatshepsut, Agrippina the Younger, Mary I of England, Ada Lovelace, Parthenope Nightingale, Eleanor of Aquitaine (Season 7), Marie Curie, Maria Theresa, Margaret of Anjou
Michael Abubakar (Series 8 – present)	Aurelian Moor Roman General, Neolithic Man, Georgian Man, Tudor Courtier, World War soldier, Windrush Migrant, Ottobah Cugoano, Alexander Hamilton
Ethan Lawrence (Series 9 – present)	Napoleon Bonaparte (Series 10 - present), Robert Curthose, Aneurin Bevan, Arthur Tudor, Gustavus Adolphus
Lolly Adefope (Series 7)	Head Teacher Hannah Lawrence, Harriet Tubman, Mary Bowser, Mary Seacole, Irène Joliot-Curie
Sanjeev Bhaskar (Series 6 - Series 7)	Dean Mahomet (Series 6 – Series 7), Mahatma Gandhi (Series 6 – Series 7), Greek Man (Series 6 – Series 7), Shah Jahan (Series 6 – Series 7), Indian Man (Series 6 — Series 7)
Louise Ford (Series 6 – Series 7)	Eleanor of Aquitaine (Series 6), Elizabeth I (Series 6 – Series 7), Antoinette de Bourbon (Series 6 – Series 7), Catherine Howard (Series 6 – Series 7), Jane Seymour (Series 6 – Series 7), Pocahontas (Series 6 – Series 7), Edith Roosevelt (Series 6 – Series 7), Mary II (Series 6 – Series 7), Frances Nightingale, mother of Florence Nightingale (Series 6 – Series 7), Maria Anna Mozart (Series 6 – Series 7)
Katherine Jakeways (Series 6)	Catherine de' Medici (Series 6), Anne of Cleves (Series 6)
Lawry Lewin (Series 6)	Brian, host of "Amazing Scientists" (Series 6), Oliver Cromwell (Series 6)
Jason Lewis (Series 6)	Jamie Castle
Bhavna Limbachia (Series 6)	Egyptian in Horrible Histories Health Direct (Series 6)
Dan Li (Series 6)	Genghis Khan (Series 6 – Series 7), Emperor Zhengde (Series 6 – Series 7), Qin Shi Huang (Series 6 – Series 7), Confucius (Series 6 – Series 7)
James McNicholas (Series 7 – present)	Charles Darwin (Series 7 – Series 8), Louis VII of France (Series 7 – Series 8), Edward VI (Series 7 – present), Henry VI (Series 7 – Series 8), William III of England (Series 7 – Series 8), Augustus (Series 7), Julius Caesar (Series 8), William the Conqueror (Series 9 - Present), George VI, Oliver Cromwell

- Richard Atwill (2016 Specials)
- Richard David-Caine (2016 Specials – present)
- Simon Farnaby (Series 6)
- Jalaal Hartley (Series 6 – present)
- Harrie Hayes (Series 8 - present)
- Jim Howick (Series 6)
- Samson Kayo (Series 7)
- Naz Osmanoglu (Series 6)
- Jessica Ransom (Series 6 – present)
- Adam Riches (Series 6)
- Ryan Sampson (Series 7)
- Tom Stourton (Series 6 – present)
- Thom Tuck (2016 Specials)
- Mike Wozniak (Series 8)
- Gemma Whelan (2016 Specials – Series 9)
- Ethan Lawrence (Series 9 - present)

Supporting cast:

- Michael Abubakar (Series 8)
- Lolly Adefope (Series 7)
- Sanjeev Bhaskar (Series 6 – Series 7)
- Louise Ford (Series 6 – Series 7)
- Katherine Jakeways (Series 6)
- Lawry Lewin (Series 6)
- Jason Lewis (Series 6)
- Bhavna Limbachia (Series 6)
- Dan Li (Series 6 – Series 7)
- Emily Lloyd-Saini (Series 8)
- James McNicholas (Series 7 – present)
- Dominique Moore (Series 6 – 2016 Specials;Series 9)
- Tom Palmer (Series 7)
- Daniel Lawrence Taylor (2016 Specials)
- Giles Terera (Series 6)
- Danielle Vitalis (Series 8)
- Natalie Walter (Series 6 – 2016 Specials)
- Ellie White (Series 7 – Series 8)
- Sophie Wu (Series 6 – Series 7)

Guest starring:

- Rowan Atkinson
- Terry Deary
- Kathryn Drysdale
- Kevin Eldon
- Mel Giedroyc
- Miles Jupp
- Ben Miller
- Tom Rosenthal
- Fred Sirieix (Series 7–8)
- Lorna Watson
- Robert Webb
- Bradley Simpson
- Dara Ó Briain
- Alex Scott
- Rosie Jones
- Dani Dyer
- Javone Prince
- Rose Ayling-Ellis
- Jo Brand

== Awards ==
Year	Nominee / work	Award	Result
2024	Horrible Histories	BAFTA Special Award	Won
2023	Horrible Histories Series 9	British Comedy Award for Best Sketch Show	Won
2018	Horrible Histories Series 7	BAFTA Children's Award for Best Writing	Nominated
2018	Tom Stourton as Henry VIII	BAFTA Children's Award for Best Performer	Nominated
2018	Horrible Histories Series 7	BAFTA Children's Award for Best Comedy	Nominated
2018	Horrible Histories Series 7	Broadcast Award for Best Children's Programme	Won
2017	Horrible Histories Special: Crooked King John and Magna Carta	International Emmy Award for Best Kids Factual	Won
2017	Horrible Histories Special: Sensational Shakespeare	Broadcast Award for Best Children's Programme	Nominated
2016	Horrible Histories Special: Sensational Shakespeare	BAFTA Children's Award for Best Comedy	Won
2016	Tom Stourton as William Shakespeare	BAFTA Children's Award for Best Performer	Nominated
2016	Horrible Histories Special: Sensational Shakespeare	BAFTA Children's Award for Best Writing	Nominated
2015	Horrible Histories Series 6	British Comedy Guide Award for Best Sketch Show	Won
2016	Horrible Histories Special: Crooked King John and Magna Carta	Kidscreen Award for Best Non-Animated or Mixed Series	Won
2016	Horrible Histories Special: Awesome Alfred the Great	Broadcast Award for Best Children's Programme	Nominated
2015	Horrible Histories Special: Crooked King John and Magna Carta	BAFTA Children's Award for Best Comedy	Nominated
2015	Jessica Ransom as Mary, Queen of Scots	BAFTA Children's Award for Best Performer	Won
2015	Horrible Histories Special: Crooked King John and Magna Carta	BAFTA Children's Award for Best Writing	Nominated

== Home releases ==
The series, treated as the sixth of the original 2009–2013 run, was released on Region 2 DVD on 31 August 2015. Episodes are also available online through UK iTunes as "Series 6: Rotten Rulers". The 2016 specials were released on DVD under "The Specials II" on 12 September 2016. The seventh series, including its then-unaired episodes, was released on DVD on 6 November 2017 for regions 2 and 4.

== Controversies ==
During November 2020, the airing of a segment on the cuisine from China's Tang Dynasty (Episode 2, Season 6) resulted in Australian viewers creating a petition for the broad boycott of the Horrible Histories, and some members of the Chinese-Australian community have asked the ABC to publicly apologise for the content. The "I'm a Tang Celebrity" segment parodied the 'Bushtucker' trials in the reality TV show, I'm a Celebrity ... Get Me Out of Here. It depicted the Chinese Empress Wu Zetian consuming larvae, cockroaches, boiled camel hoof, bamboo rat, jellyfish and steamed bear. An ABC article notes that:

"Many Chinese Australians believe the sketch would not have been intended as offensive to the community. But they are concerned it may result in further misrepresentations of their culture, beliefs, practices and could lead to their kids being questioned or bullied at their schools."
