= Conor McNamara =

Irish sports commentator

- Born: Limerick, Ireland
- Education: BA (hons) TV & Radio, Post-graduate diploma in Business Studies
- Alma mater: University of Salford; University College Dublin (UCD)
- Occupation: Sports commentator

Conor McNamara is an Irish sports commentator. He is the lead commentator for Premier League Productions and also works for BBC Sport on Radio 5 Live and Match of the Day, Amazon Prime Video and Sky Sports.

In April 2026 McNamara was voted Commentator of the Year at the Sports Journalists' Association British Sports Journalism Awards 2025. Away from sport, he voices the character of 'Squawk The Parrot' on CBeebies show Swashbuckle.

== Early life ==
McNamara was born in Limerick, where he attended the Jesuit Crescent College. McNamara studied at the University of Salford, where he earned a Degree in Television and Radio. He also attended the Michael Smurfit Graduate Business School at University College Dublin where he received a Post Graduate Diploma in Business Studies.

== Career ==
While still at university, McNamara did his first football commentary for Irish national radio station Today FM - the 1997 FA Cup Final.

He joined the Irish TV station TV3 in Dublin at its launch in 1998 as a sports presenter and commentator. His first commentary for national television was the Republic of Ireland versus Yugoslavia in 1998. He became TV3's UEFA Champions League commentator in 1999, before joining the BBC in 2002.

=== Football ===
McNamara's first national radio commentary for BBC Radio 5 Live was Bolton v Tottenham in August 2002. His first Match of the Day commentary for BBC television was Everton versus Aston Villa in October 2004.

McNamara regularly commentates on the Premier League, the FA Cup, the UEFA Champions League and internationals. He has worked at every FIFA World Cup since 1998 and every UEFA European Championship since 2004.

Each year from 2014 to 2023, McNamara was nominated as Football Supporters' Federation Commentator of the Year.

=== Rugby union ===
McNamara commentates on rugby union for BBC television, Amazon Prime Video and Sky Sports. He regularly covers Ireland's games for BBC radio. McNamara commentated on all 13 games TV3 Ireland covered for the 2007 Rugby World cup alongside BBC colleague Philip Matthews. McNamara's first live TV commentary game for the BBC was Scotland versus Italy in the Six Nations Championship in 2011 and he has commentated on at least one match at every tournament since. McNamara returned to TV3 for the 2015 Rugby World Cup as a presenter and commentator as TV3 had exclusive rights to the tournament and covered all games on TV3 and 3e alongside Keith Wood, Peter Stringer and Stuart Barnes.

McNamara provided world feed commentary for World Rugby from Japan at the 2019 Rugby World Cup and from France at the 2023 Rugby World Cup.

McNamara has been part of the Amazon Prime Video commentary team for the Autumn Nations Cup since 2020.

=== Golf ===
McNamara is part of the BBC's golf commentary team and has worked at every The Open Championship since 2006. He has also regularly worked at The Ryder Cup, The PGA Championship and The Solheim Cup.

=== Swashbuckle ===
McNamara is known to a younger, pre-school audience, as the voice of "Squawk" the parrot on the Cbeebies show Swashbuckle.

=== Other BBC appearances ===
McNamara appears on Phil Williams' Team Talk on Wednesday nights on BBC Radio Five Live with fellow BBC Sport broadcaster Dan Walker.
