= Mr. Sloane =

- Genre: Comedy
- Written by: Robert B. Weide; Aschlin Ditta; Oliver Lansley
- Directed by: Robert B. Weide
- Starring: Nick Frost; Olivia Colman; Ophelia Lovibond; Peter Serafinowicz; Lawry Lewin; Michael Malarkey; Brendan Patricks
- Country of origin: United Kingdom
- Original language: English
- No. of series: 1
- No. of episodes: 6

Production
- Producer: Clelia Mountford
- Production companies: Big Talk Productions; Whyaduck Productions

Original release
- Network: Sky Atlantic
- Release: 23 May – 27 June 2014

Mr. Sloane is a British comedy television series that was first broadcast on Sky Atlantic on 23 May 2014. The six-part series was written by Robert B. Weide, Aschlin Ditta and Oliver Lansley and directed by Robert B. Weide. It is set in Watford in 1969.

== Overview ==
In 1969 in Watford, Hertfordshire, Jeremy Sloane, a depressed accountant, has lost his job and his wife, Janet. Sloane gets a part-time job, and at a hardware shop he meets a young, free-spirited American manic pixie dream girl named Robin who may just help him get his life back on track.

== Cast ==
- Nick Frost as Jeremy Sloane
- Olivia Colman as Janet
- Ophelia Lovibond as Robin
- Peter Serafinowicz as Ross
- Lawry Lewin as Beans
- Michael Malarkey as Craig
- Brendan Patricks as Reggie

== Production ==
Filming began in April 2013. The series is a Big Talk Productions and Whyaduck Productions production with BBC Worldwide as the distributor.

In October 2014, Sky announced the show would not be returning for a second series.

== International broadcast ==
The series premiered in Australia on 15 June 2015 on BBC First.
