= Richard David-Caine =

English actor

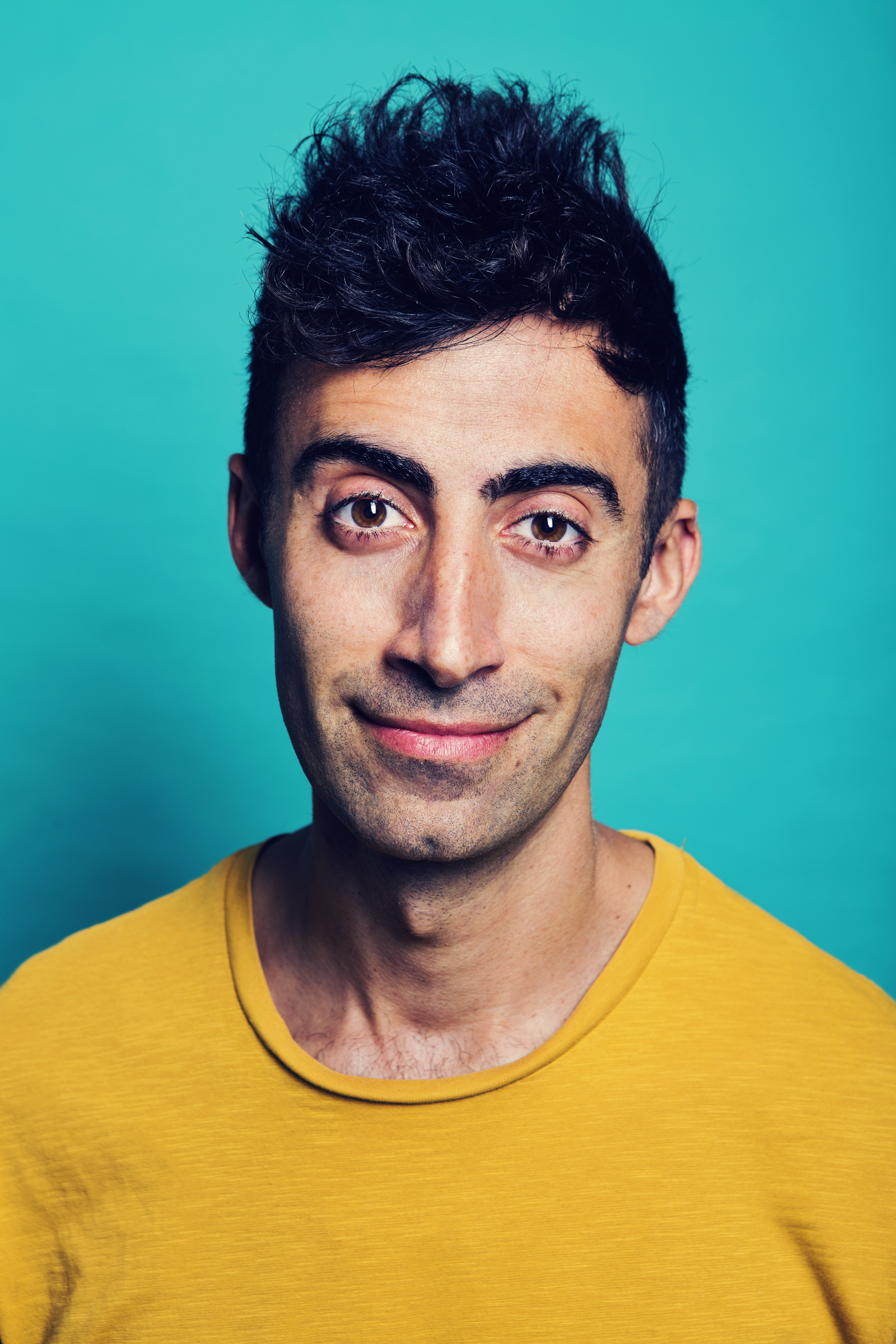
- Born: 5 April 1987 (age 39)
- Occupations: Actor, writer, voiceover artist
- Known for: Swashbuckle, Horrible Histories, Class Dismissed

Richard David-Caine (born 5 April 1987) is an English actor, writer and voiceover artist. Between 2013 and 2019 he played the character of Line in the CBeebies series Swashbuckle. He is also part of the key ensembles in the BBC comedies Horrible Histories and Class Dismissed; for the latter he was nominated in the 2017 and 2019 RTS Awards for Best Performance in a Comedy. In 2020, he co-created, wrote and starred in Big Fat Like, a sketch comedy show pastiching the Internet.

== Personal life ==
David-Caine is from Ruislip, North-west London. He graduated from Mountview Academy of Theatre Arts in 2009.

In 2020, whilst promoting his one-man show 'Tall, Dark and Anxious', Richard opened up about his personal struggles with his mental health and urged anyone else struggling to reach out for help.

== Career ==
In 2009, David-Caine set up his own comedy group, Four Screws Loose, along with Joseph Elliott, Conan House and Thom Ford. The group performed five shows in successive years at the Edinburgh Festival Fringe, as well as performing at Bestival, Latitude Festival, Underbelly Southbank Festival, Brighton Fringe and Adelaide Fringe Festival. They were selected as New Act of the Year (NATYS: New Acts of the Year Show) finalists 2013 and featured on BBC Radio 4's Sketchorama and BBC Radio 1's Fun and Filth Cabaret. The group's style revolved around high energy routines, physical comedy and audience interaction and garnered mostly positive reviews.

David-Caine's first lead TV role came when he and Elliott were cast as the comedy double act Cook and Line on CBeebies' new pirate gameshow, Swashbuckle. The show was a hit and lead to other appearances on the channel including A Midsummer Night's Dream, The Tempest (RSC co-productions) and the annual Christmas shows. David-Caine was also selected as part of the core cast in BAFTA-winning comedy sketch show, Horrible Histories. As well as this, he has starred in five series of BBC mockumentary, Class Dismissed.

In 2020 Richard developed, wrote and starred in his own sketch comedy series, Big Fat Like, alongside comedy partner, Joseph Elliott. The show satirises YouTube and also features Amy Gledhill and Ibinabo Jack. Other notable work includes BBC Three sitcoms Dead Air (as best friend, Hardip) and People Just Do Nothing (as Chabuddy G's boss, Sam). Richard voices a variety of characters in CBBC comedy, The Zoo, Entertainment One's animated series Ricky Zoom and CBeebies' Supertato, based on the popular book series.

In 2022, David-Caine returned to the Edinburgh Fringe with his debut, one-man show, 'Tall, Dark and Anxious'. The show proved popular and earned him the Amused Moose Comedy Award for Most Outstanding Show, and a subsequent Soho Theatre transfer the following year. In 2023, he was featured in the Royal National Theatre production of Dave Malloy's The Witches.

== Filmography ==
=== Television ===
Year	Title	Role	Channel	Notes
2012	Skins: Redux	Rupert	E4	1 episode
2013–2019	Swashbuckle	Line	CBeebies, BBC One	156 episodes
2015	Dead Air	Hardip	BBC Three	
2015–2016	Justin's House	Line, Oogie Boogie Plant	CBeebies	4 episodes
2015–2019	Class Dismissed	Various	CBBC	52 episodes
2016	CBeebies A Midsummer Night's Dream	Line	CBeebies	
2016	Shakespeare Live! From the RSC	Gabriel Spencer	BBC Two	
2016–present	Horrible Histories	Various	CBBC	Ongoing
2017	Big Field	Various	BBC Three	8 episodes
2017	InterNOT	Various	BBC iPlayer	8 episodes
2017–2018	People Just Do Nothing	Sam	BBC Three	4 episodes
2019	Doctors	Tahir Wakim	BBC One	1 episode
2020	Avenue 5	Waiter	HBO	2 episodes
2020	Big Fat Like	Various	CBBC	10 episodes
2021	Finding Alice	Ralph	ITV	1 episode
2021	Midsomer Murders	Simeon Dagley	ITV	1 episode
2021	Murder They Hope	Tariq	Gold	1 episode
2022	Better Things	Very Tall Man	FX	1 episode
2022–present	Supertato	Tomato	CBeebies,	67 episodes
2025	Horrible Science	Various	CBBC	15 Episodes
