= The Curse of King Tut's Tomb (2006 film) =

- DVD cover
- Written by: David Titcher
- Directed by: Russell Mulcahy
- Starring: Casper Van Dien; Leonor Varela; Jonathan Hyde
- Theme music composer: Nathan Furst
- Country of origin: United States
- Original language: English

Production
- Producer: Mitch Engel
- Cinematography: Chris Manley
- Editor: Colleen Halsey
- Running time: 170 minutes
- Production company: Hallmark Entertainment

Original release
- Network: Hallmark Channel; Sci-Fi Channel
- Release: May 27, 2006

The Curse of King Tut's Tomb (also known as The Curse of King Tut) is a 2006 adventure fantasy horror television film directed by Russell Mulcahy and starring Casper Van Dien, Leonor Varela, and Jonathan Hyde.

== Plot ==
In ancient Egypt, Tutankhamun, the boy pharaoh who is said to have died young, was actually sent by the sun god Ra to protect the people from the demon Set, who escaped from the Underworld and caused chaos in Egypt. With Ra's blessing, Tutankhamun manages to overcome Set and keep the demon under control by breaking an emerald tablet into four pieces and sending the pieces to the far corners of the world. However, the tradeoff is that he must remain in the Underworld.

In 1922, Danny Fremont, an archaeologist, is searching for the last piece of the tablet, which is believed to be in Tutankhamun's tomb. He found the first three pieces earlier, but they were seized from him by his rival, Morgan Sinclair. Sinclair is in the service of the Hellfire Council, a secret committee formed by a group of influential men from around the world, and they wish to use the tablet's powers to achieve their goal of world domination. Sinclair uses the Hellfire Council's influence to damage Fremont's reputation and cause him to lose his job.

Fremont is undaunted by the challenges he faces. With help from his buddies, he manages to convince several others, including a sceptical Egyptologist named Azelia Barakat, to join him in his quest to find Tutankhamun's tomb and the last piece of the tablet. Despite their efforts, the last piece still falls into the hands of Sinclair and the Hellfire Council. Sinclair assembles all four pieces in the tomb, absorbs the tablet's powers, and unleashes Set and the demons of the Underworld. He also gets rid of the Hellfire Council's members later.

Fremont and his companions manage to hold off Sinclair and other enemies and make their way back to the tomb, where they open a portal to the Underworld. In the Underworld, Fremont and his friends succeed in finding and freeing Tutankhamun, but the boy pharaoh is too weak to help them. Meanwhile, Sinclair is absorbed by Set, who then attacks Fremont. At the critical moment, Barakat prays to Ra to empower Tutankhamun and her wish is granted. Tutankhamun springs to life, fights and destroys Set, and brings Fremont and Barakat (the only two survivors) safely out of the Underworld. Before leaving, Tutankhamun thanks them and tells them that "all things are as they should have been". Fremont and Barakat do not understand what he means and they leave the tomb just before it closes by itself.

Back in the streets of Cairo, Fremont and Barakat finally understand what Tutankhamun meant when they see that all the negative events which happened earlier have been reversed: their dead companions are alive and well; Barakat's fiancé is happily married to another woman and has a family. Fremont chances upon Howard Carter and gives him the map to Tutankhamun's tomb; Carter becomes world-famous for his "discovery". At the end, in the Museum of Antiquities, Fremont proposes to Barakat and she agrees to marry him.

== Cast ==
- Casper Van Dien as Danny Fremont, an archaeologist searching for Tutankhamen's tomb and the emerald tablet.
- Jonathan Hyde as Morgan Sinclair, Fremont's rival and an Egyptologist working for the Hellfire Council.
- Leonor Varela as Azelia Barakat, an Egyptologist who becomes Fremont's romantic interest.
- Steven Waddington as Jason McGreevy, Fremont's buddy.
- Niko Nicotera as Andrew Walker, Fremont's buddy. He has tuberculosis but is given a cure by Sinclair. In return, he leads Sinclair to the last piece of the tablet. Sinclair kills him later.
- Tat Whalley as Rembrandt, a prisoner who joins Fremont's expedition. He is an explosives specialist.
- Brendan Patricks as Brian Eastcliff, a British aristocrat who joins Fremont in his expedition.
- Patrick Toomey as Jacques Belmond, the leader of a group of French mercenaries who joins Fremont in his expedition.
- Malcolm McDowell as Nathan Cairns, the chairman of the Hellfire Council.
- Simon Callow as George Russell, a member of the Hellfire Council.
- Rajesh Balwani as Prakesh, the museum curator who serves as Sinclair's adviser.
- Robin Das as Mahmoud, an Egyptian medium who helps Fremont and his friends communicate with Tutankhamen's spirit.
- Parvin Dabas as Yunan Heikal, an Egyptian police captain and Barakat's fiancé.
- Suvarchala Narayanan as Margaretha Zelle, a dancer planted as a spy by Sinclair in Fremont's expedition. She turns against Sinclair later and helps Freemont instead.
- David Schofield as Harry Axelrod, a cameraman who records Fremont's discovery.
- Francisco Bosch as Tutankhamen, the boy pharaoh.

== Production ==
It was filmed in Jaipur and Mumbai in India. Van Dien compared his character to Indiana Jones, noting that his character was geekier and that he was "not as cool" as Harrison Ford.

Originally intended to be a four-hour miniseries, The Curse of King Tut's Tomb had about an hour and forty-five minutes edited from the length for the screener copy sent to critics; the version aired on Hallmark was approximately 180 minutes in length.

== Release ==
The film debuted in Spain on April 11, 2006. The film premiered on Hallmark Channel on May 27, 2006. The first DVD release was in Japan on December 23, 2006.

== Reception ==
Critical reception for the film upon its release on Hallmark was negative. TV Guide reviewed the film, stating that "the CG-laden miniseries is a gluttonous bore of a tale that is only interesting for the cheesy effects that pop up on the screen every ten or so odd minutes. Otherwise, it's a spot-that-poor-classy actor game, which almost always leads to Malcolm McDowell, who's seen better days in far more worthwhile projects". A reviewer for the Hartford Courant was similarly critical, as they felt that "the thing doesn't even have an ending, preferring to say 'To Be Continued ...' as if it were an old afternoon serial, or a movie we actually cared about".

== See also ==
- Ancient Egypt in the Western imagination
- Curse of the pharaohs
