= Lawry Lewin =

English actor

- Born: Lawrence Valdemar Lewin; 28 November 1973 (age 52); Guisborough, England
- Occupation: Actor
- Years active: 1988–present

Lawrence Valdemar Lewin (born 28 November 1973) is an English television actor. He appears on the CBBC show Horrible Histories, and featured in the Doctor Who Christmas special "The End of Time".

== Career ==
Lawry played a role in the Doctor Who Christmas special "The End of Time". Lewin is a friend of actor and writer John Finnemore; since 2011, he has acted as part of the regular ensemble in John Finnemore's Souvenir Programme, a sketch show for BBC Radio 4. He played "Beans" in the 2014 comedy miniseries Mr. Sloane.

== Filmography ==
=== Television ===
Year	Title	Role	Notes
1988–89	Grange Hill	Tommy; Tony	3 episodes
2006	Extras	Researcher	Episode: "Jonathan Ross"
2007	Touch Me, I'm Karen Taylor		7 episodes
2007	The Life and Times of Vivienne Vyle	Damien	6 episodes
2009	Grownups	Joe	Episode: "Winks"
2009	Doctor Who	Rossiter	Episode: "The End of Time"
2010–2013	Horrible Histories	Various Characters including Thomas More, King George III and Oliver Cromwell	
2012	Casualty	Des Wilmot	Episode: "My Aim is True"
2014	Some Girls	Uncle Eddie	Series 3 Episodes 1 and 2
2014	Mr. Sloane	Beans	
2015	Horrible Histories	Various	
