= Jason Lewis (comedian) =

British actor and comedian

- Born: London, England
- Occupations: Actor, writer, comedian
- Notable work: Dennis Pennis; Mike Strutter

Jason Lewis (born in London, England) is a British actor, writer, and comedian of Trinidadian descent. He is best known for his self-titled sketch comedy show The Jason Lewis Experience, which saw its first installment aired on BBC Three.

== Career ==
Jason Lewis started his career training at The Anna Scher Theatre as an actor for 6 years.

In 2007 Lewis wrote and filmed the first installment of The Jason Lewis Experience, a series of short comedic sketches for YouTube.

In 2008 MTV agreed to give Lewis his own sketch show on their channel. The Jason Lewis Experience debuted in January 2009 on MTV Base.

During 2009 Jason Lewis was cast as an actor and writer for BBC show Bellamy's People, created by the BAFTA Award winning Paul Whitehouse and Charlie Higson. He also appeared in BBC2 hit sitcom Miranda and the second series of BBC Three sitcom Coming of Age.

In 2010 he was a regular cast member in the third series of the BAFTA Award-winning The Armstrong and Miller Show for BBC1 and featured in the BAFTA Award-winning Harry and Paul, created by Harry Enfield and Paul Whitehouse.

During 2010 Lewis also created and starred in his own BBC online sketch comedy pilot show called SWA (Sniggers With Attitude), which featured appearances from Paul Whitehouse, Noel Clarke, Rufus Hound, and Daniel Kaluuya. In June 2010, BBC announced that Danny Cohen, controller of BBC Three, had commissioned Jason Lewis his own pilot titled The Jason Lewis Experience for the channel. The pilot featured Harry Enfield, Paul Whitehouse, Daniel Kaluuya, Trevor Nelson and David Schneider.

He was crowned a 'Broadcast Hotshot' of the TV Industry by Broadcast Magazine.

Lewis was featured in the 12th series of Holby City where he played Chris Brand. He also starred in a revival of The Fast Show.

In 2012 he played an American reporter Scott in the feature film Red Lights.

Lewis played Warden Wagatungi in series 2 and 3 of the award-winning Harry and Paul.

He featured in series 4 and 6 of popular children's TV program Horrible Histories, which both won BAFTA Awards.

In 2015 Lewis starred as Curtis Broome in the third series of Some Girls for BBC Three. He was also a main cast member in series 1 and 2 of award-winning comedy Murder in Successville on BBC Three.

During 2016 he fronted the ITV2 mockumentary show What's The Facts, featured heavily throughout the first series of David Walliams' BBC One comedy Walliams & Friend and performed his one-person stage play POVs From The Grove, during the Camden Fringe.

He also starred in the BBC Radio 2 show Harry and Paul present: The Gentleman's Club alongside Harry Enfield, Paul Whitehouse, Jim Broadbent and Tom Hollander.

In 2017 Lewis starred in the BBC Three show Climaxed, created by Tom Craine, wrapped filming upcoming Disney comedy feature film Patrick slated for 2018 and has recently begun shooting the second series of Damned created by Jo Brand for Channel 4 after being cast as PC Zeppelin.

== Other work ==
Lewis has released many music spoofs. Artists he has parodied include Tinchy Stryder, N-Dubz, Jay-Z and Alicia Keys. On 14 July 2009, he and his close friend Daniel Kaluuya released a parody of Boy Better Know's "Too Many Man", titled "Too Many Weave". It was based upon the fact they thought that too many women wear fake hair (hair extensions) nowadays. The video was in YouTube's Most Viewed for 14, 15 and 16 July that year.
