= Fergus Craig =

British actor and comedian

- Born: 19 April 1980 (age 46); Sunderland, United Kingdom
- Education: University of Manchester

Comedy career
- Years active: 2004–present

Fergus Craig (born 19 April 1980) is a British stand-up comic and actor in theatre, television and radio. He studied at the University of Manchester. Craig is one half of the double act Colin & Fergus, with actor and writer Colin Hoult.

== Career ==
Between 2004 and 2008 Craig and Hoult performed regularly on the London comedy circuit. They performed three shows at the Edinburgh Festival Fringe, Colin & Fergus '04, Colin & Fergus 2 '05 and Rutherford Lodge '06.

In 2006 Craig played Alan Bennett in Pete and Dud: Come Again, a play by Chris Bartlett and Nick Awde on the life of Peter Cook and Dudley Moore. The play ran at the 2006 Edinburgh Festival Fringe, then transferred to London's West End and toured New Zealand.

In 2007 he joined the cast of Channel 4's Star Stories and was a regular in Series 2 and 3 of the show.

In 2009, he won the Hackney Empire New Act of the Year with his solo stand-up act. He also joined the cast of the Bafta nominated BBC show Sorry, I've Got No Head the same year.

In 2010 he played the role of Devon Mills in BBC2 sitcom Popatron.

In 2011 he played the role of Lionel Putty in CBBC show Hotel Trubble.

In 2012, he joined the cast of The Amazing World of Gumball as the character Sussie.

Craig appeared in Disney+ historical drama series A Thousand Blows, and in 2025 was cast as Mr Hurst in Jane Austen spin-off television series The Other Bennet Sister, an adaptation of the book by Janice Hadlow.

In 2014, Craig published a spoof advice guide, called "Tips For Actors", and in 2021 it was announced that Craig would publish his first novel, entitled Once Upon a Crime. In 2020, Craig had created a series of spoof extracts from a crime novel written by the character of Martin Fishback featuring the character of Detective Roger Le Carre. These have spawned two full-length spoof crime novels, plus a pilot for a sitcom. In 2023, his novel Murder at Crime Manor was nominated for the Bollinger Everyman Wodehouse Prize. In 2026, his comedic cosy crime novel I’m Not The Only Murderer In My Retirement Home was published.

== Filmography ==
- Get a Grip (2007) TV series – Various (2007)
- Comedy: Shuffle (2007) TV series – Various (unknown episodes, 2007)
- Extras – Runner (1 episode, 2007, series finale)
- Star Stories – Nigel Martin-Smith, Declan Donnelly, Russell Brand (11 episodes, 2007–8)
- Mist: Sheepdog Tales (13 episodes, 2007)
- EastEnders – Chip Shop Assistant (1 episode, 22 March 2007)
- After You've Gone – P.C. Walker (1 episode, 2007, Lock Back in Anger)
- Raging (2007) (TV) – Various Characters
- Jonathan Creek – Paramedic (1 episode, 2004, The Chequered Box)
- Hut 33 (radio) – Gordon (18 episodes)
- The Amazing World of Gumball – Sussie (2012–2016, seasons 2–4)
- Hoff the Record (2015–2016, 12 episodes)
- Knuckles (2024, 4 episodes)

== Books ==
Title	Publisher	ISBN	Year
Once Upon a Crime: Martin's Fishback's hilarious Detective Roger LeCarre parody 'thriller'	Sphere	ISBN 0751583820 ISBN 978-0751583823	2021
Murder at Crime Manor: Martin's Fishback's ridiculous second Detective Roger LeCarre parody 'thriller'	Sphere	ISBN 1408727331ISBN 978-1408727331	2022
I'm not the only murderer in my retirement home	Berkley Mystery	ISBN 9798217189052	2026
