= Play Wisty For Me – The Life of Peter Cook =

Play Wisty For Me – The Life of Peter Cook is an original play by Matthew Perret and Jeremy Limb, using the characters portrayed by Peter Cook and Dudley Moore (Pete and Dud, Derek and Clive, E. L. Wisty, Sir Arthur Streeb-Greebling and Sven the Norwegian fisherman) to tell the story of Peter Cook's life and pay tribute to his comic genius. After Moore's death, it was slightly rewritten, to become more of a tribute to Moore too.

It premiered at the Pleasance Theatre at the Edinburgh Festival Fringe 1998, selling out for the entire run. It was well received by the press for its use of entirely new material and was runner-up for the LWT Comedy Writing Award 1998.

It had a run at Riverside Studios, Hammersmith, in June 1999 and another sell-out run at the Pleasance, Edinburgh in August 1999.

It was performed at the Melbourne International Comedy Festival in 2002, its opening night coinciding with the death of Dudley Moore. It continued with a short run at C Venues in Edinburgh 2002, and a UK tour in 2003-4
