= Pete and Dud =

Fictional characters

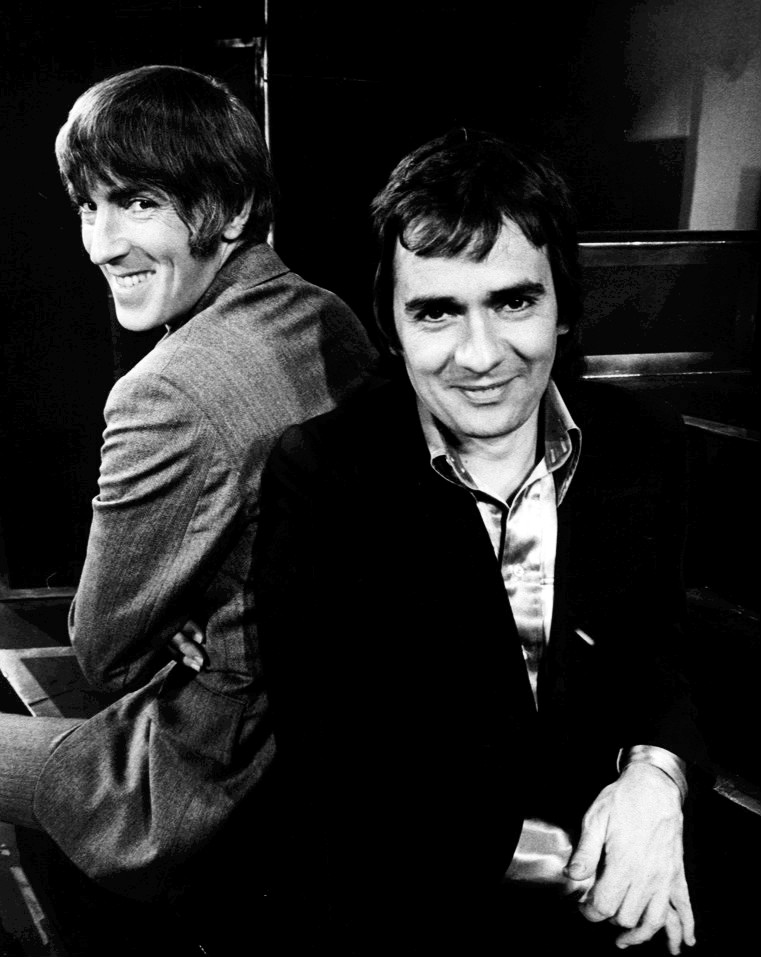
Peter Cook ('Pete') and Dudley Moore ('Dud') in 1974

Pete and Dud were characters played by the comedians and entertainers Peter Cook and Dudley Moore.

The dialogue format originated in 1964 when Dudley Moore invited Peter Cook to appear in a television performance. Cook scripted a conversation between two men from Dagenham wearing flat caps. This proved to be very popular with television audiences and the partnership was continued during the series Not Only... But Also.

Pete is a know-it-all and would-be intellectual, very much in the spirit of E. L. Wisty, and Dud is a put-upon Herbert in a subservient role, who tries to impress Pete with his knowledge. Neither of them has any real sense.

The "Dagenham Dialogues" between the two ranged from paintings (Pete finds the Mona Lisa snooty, and the bottoms of Rubens's nudes seem to follow them around the room), reasons why geckos do not live long and being annoyed by film stars (including "bloody Greta Garbo" and "bloody Anna Magnani") pestering them for romance.

During the 1970s, Cook and Moore used a similar formula for the more adult Derek and Clive recordings.

The comic and personal relationship between Cook and Moore is the subject of the play Pete and Dud: Come Again, by Chris Bartlett and Nick Awde. In 2010, a group of comedians, Hugh Dennis, Angus Deayton and Alistair McGowan among them, recreated some of the Pete and Dud comic routines on BBC Two in Pete and Dud: the Lost Sketches.

Recalling his relationship with David Bowie, English musician Brian Eno has stated "We knew each other for over 40 years, in a friendship that was always tinged by echoes of Pete and Dud.”. Eno has recalled that during the recording sessions for Bowie's "Heroes" album, he and Bowie would communicate in Peter Cook and Dudley Moore voices: "We slipped into Peter Cook and Dudley Moore characters. Bowie was Pete and I was Dud, and for the whole time we stayed in character. “Ooh, I dunno about that synthesizer part, Dud.”” Bowie himself recalled, "Brian and I did have Pete and Dud down pretty pat. Long dialogues about John Cage performing on a ‘prepared layer’ at the Bricklayers Arms on the Old Kent Road and the like. Quite silly.”
