= One Over The Eight =

Original theatrical poster

One Over the Eight was a comedy revue which opened on April 5, 1961. It was written by Peter Cook and starred Kenneth Williams.

The material included a "One Leg Too Few" sketch and "Interesting Facts" sketch with Williams playing an E. L. Wisty character. It also featured Sheila Hancock, Lance Percival and Lance Mulcahy.

The Evening News said it was "Scandalously funny" while the Evening Standard said it was "Snappy and gay." It was performed at the Duke of York's Theatre, London.

It was the sequel to Pieces of Eight.
