= Laurie Johnson =

English composer (1927–2024)

Laurie Johnson MBE
- Born: Laurence Reginald Ward Johnson; 7 February 1927; Hampstead, London, England
- Died: 16 January 2024 (aged 96)
- Genres: Pop, swing, soundtrack
- Occupations: Composer, bandleader, conductor, arranger
- Years active: 1951–2024

Laurence Reginald Ward Johnson (7 February 1927 – 16 January 2024) was an English composer and bandleader who wrote scores for dozens of film and television series, described as "one of the most highly regarded arrangers of big-band swing and pop music" in England. Much of Johnson's music was written for the KPM music library, for which he composed and conducted between 1960 and 1965.

== Early career, theatre and KPM ==
Johnson was born in Hampstead, London, England on 7 February 1927. He studied at the Royal College of Music, where his tutors included Herbert Howells and Ralph Vaughan Williams, and took trumpet lessons with Ernest Hall. He spent four years in the Coldstream Guards (playing French horn) before moving to the entertainment industry in the 1950s, arranging for Ted Heath, Jack Parnell and others. One of his first major projects was as composer and music director in a musical adaptation of Henry Fielding's Rape Upon Rape, entitled Lock Up Your Daughters (1959). The score, with lyrics by Lionel Bart, won an Ivor Novello Award. It opened the new Mermaid Theatre in 1959 and was later revived at the Mermaid in 1962, transferring to the West End in 1963. Johnson's other stage work included music for the Peter Cook revue, Pieces of Eight (1959), and The Four Musketeers (1967), starring Harry Secombe.

Johnson began writing and recording for the KPM Music Library in 1960, holding orchestral sessions at the Friends House on Euston Road and at Denis Preston's Lansdowne Studios, where he was aided by engineer Adrian Kerridge. At the sessions Johnson produced two styles of music: light orchestral and big band jazz. He was also house conductor for KPM in the 1960s. Some of the library music pieces were also issued as commercial recordings – The New Big Sound of the Laurie Johnson Orchestra (1963) and The Big New Sound Strikes Again (1965) on Denis Preston's Record Supervision label, and the Two Cities Suite (1966), which was licensed to Pye Records. The Trend Setters, recorded for KPM in 1960, was used as the theme tune for the BBC's Whicker's World until 1968. His library music has been used more recently in a number of animation series, including SpongeBob SquarePants and Ren And Stimpy.

== Television and film ==
In 1961, Johnson entered the UK Singles Chart with "Sucu Sucu", the theme music from the UK television series Top Secret. It was in this area of television scoring that he was to be most prolific, and in 1965 he left KPM to work directly for various television companies. From the 1960s to the 1980s he composed over fifty themes and scores, including the theme used on This Is Your Life (entitled "Gala Performance"), The Avengers (from 1965), Animal Magic (entitled "Las Vegas"), Jason King, The New Avengers and The Professionals. He was one of the founders, with Albert Fennell and Brian Clemens, of Mark One Productions, the television production company responsible for The New Avengers and The Professionals. Later in his career Johnson provided DVD commentaries on several of the series in which he was involved. For radio he provided the theme music to the BBC Radio 1 series Sounds of Jazz, introduced by Peter Clayton and broadcast on Sunday evenings from October 1973 onwards.

Johnson's film scores included: The Good Companions, The Moonraker (1958), Tiger Bay, Dr. Strangelove, First Men in the Moon, You Must Be Joking!, And Soon the Darkness, Captain Kronos – Vampire Hunter and Diagnosis: Murder (the 1975 Christopher Lee film). The 1970 television film Mister Jerico involved many of the original Avengers team, including Patrick Macnee.

Johnson released albums of his band playing music from The Avengers, The New Avengers and The Professionals, albums of his scores for The First Men in the Moon, Dr Strangelove and Captain Kronos, and two albums of his conducting compositions of others: the film music of Dmitri Tiomkin, and Bernard Herrmann's suite for North by Northwest. Their "Theme From 'The Professionals'" peaked on the UK Singles Chart at number 36 in May 1997.

== Orchestral and band music ==
In the 1990s, several of Johnson's early recordings were re-issued on the Unicorn-Kanchana label. These included his own compositions The Royal Tour, The Wind in the Willows and Symphony: Synthesis for a large ensemble comprising a jazz orchestra and symphony orchestra. Originally released by EMI Records in 1969, Symphony featured several famous jazz names including Tubby Hayes, Don Lusher, Joe Harriott, Kenny Wheeler and Stan Tracey, as well as the London Philharmonic Orchestra. It was followed by Conquistadors (1971), a 25 minute piece for brass, organ and percussion with narrator, based on the Spanish repression of the Aztecs. Its highly unusual scoring includes ten trumpets, ten French horns, ten trombones, two tubas, eight percussionists and organ.

The suite for military band To the Few was composed in 1989 to commemorate the 50th anniversary of the Battle of Britain. In 1997 Johnson began touring his own band, The London Big Band with Jack Parnell as conductor and soloists Don Lusher, Vince Hill, Kenny Baker and Tom Whittle. Three CDs of their performances were issued.

== Personal life and death ==
Johnson married his wife Doris ('Dot') Morley in 1957. In 1962 the family moved into Priory House, Clamp Hill in Stanmore, North London, where they stayed until retiring to the West Country in 2015. The property is a Grade II listed building and was offered for sale at £4.6 million. Johnson retired from composition work in the early 1990s. He published an autobiography, Noises in the Head, in 2000. He was appointed Member of the Order of the British Empire (MBE) in the 2014 Birthday Honours for services to music.

He died on 16 January 2024 after a short illness, at the age of 96. He is survived by his wife Dot and daughter Sarah.

== List of works ==
=== Television themes ===
- No Hiding Place (1959)
- Whicker's World (1960)
- Echo Four Two (1961)
- Top Secret (1961)
- Animal Magic (1962)
- Riviera Police (1965)
- The Avengers (1965)
- This Is Your Life (1969)
- Red Gauntlet (1970)
- Shirley's World (1971)
- Jason King (1971)
- Thriller (1973)
- The New Avengers (1976)
- The Professionals (1977)
- W1A (2014)

=== Film music ===
- The Good Companions (1957)
- The Moonraker (1958)
- Girls at Sea (1958)
- No Trees in the Street (1959)
- Tiger Bay (1959)
- Operation Bullshine (1959)
- I Aim at the Stars (1960)
- Spare The Rod (1961)
- What a Whopper (1961)
- Siege of the Saxons (1963)
- Bitter Harvest (1963)
- Dr. Strangelove (1964)
- First Men in the Moon (1964)
- East of Sudan (1964)
- The Beauty Jungle (1964)
- You Must Be Joking! (1965)
- Hot Millions (1968)
- Mister Jerico (1970)
- And Soon the Darkness (1970)
- The Firechasers (1971)
- Captain Kronos – Vampire Hunter (1972)
- The Belstone Fox (1973)
- The Maids (1974)
- Hedda (1975)
- Diagnosis: Murder (1975)
- It Shouldn't Happen to a Vet (1976)
- A Hazard of Hearts (1987)
- It's Alive III: Island of the Alive (1987)
- The Lady and the Highwayman (1989)
- A Ghost in Monte Carlo (1990)

=== Library music ===
- "Blood in the Gutter" (from Two Cities Suite) KPM
- "Fashion Centre", KPMLPB-0010 (1960)
- "Fisticuffs" (fight music from "The Avengers") KPM
- "Gala Performance" (theme from "This Is Your Life") KPM
- "Happy Go Lively", KPM110 (1962)
- "Lonely Stranger" (from "The Avengers", Episode: "Joker") KPM
- "Paris Honeymoon", KPM086 (1961)
- "Shopping Spree", KPM

=== Concert music ===
- Concerto For Trumpet, Tenor Saxophone and Orchestra (1999)
- Overture to Irma La Goose
- Royal Tour Suite, for military band
- Symphony (Synthesis) (1969)
- Three Paintings by Lautrec, for military band
- To the Few (1989), for military band
- The Wind In Willows (Tone Poem) (1985)

=== Theatre music ===
- Lock Up Your Daughters (1959)
- Pieces of Eight (1959)
- The Four Musketeers (1967)
