= Chris Bartlett (writer) =

English playwright and arts journalist

Chris Bartlett (born in Bridgend, Wales on 25 August 1976) is a Welsh, Cheshire-based playwright and arts journalist.

== Plays ==
Along with Nick Awde, he co-wrote the stage play Pete and Dud: Come Again, a hit at the Assembly Rooms at the 2005 Edinburgh Festival Fringe (under the title of Come Again: The World of Peter Cook and Dudley Moore), where it was shortlisted for a Fringe First Award by The Scotsman, before transferring to London's West End at The Venue (now Leicester Square Theatre), in March 2006, starring Kevin Bishop as Dudley Moore, Tom Goodman-Hill as Peter Cook and Colin Hoult as Jonathan Miller.

Pete and Dud: Come Again also headlined the Best of British theatre festival at the Bruce Morton Centre in Auckland in June 2006 and was published in playtext form by Methuen (2006). It embarked on a three-month tour of the UK in spring 2007.

The play charts the sometimes rocky relationship between Moore and Cook, from their first pairing as part of the pioneering Beyond the Fringe in 1960 to their controversial Derek and Clive albums in the late seventies. It was described as "an absorbing tragicomedy about the price of laughter and the true cost of fame" by William Cook in British newspaper The Guardian when it transferred to the West End.

A follow-up, Unnatural Acts, a comedy drama also written with Awde about two flatmates – one a gay man and the other a heterosexual woman – who decide to have a baby, premiered at the Gilded Balloon as part of the 2007 Edinburgh Festival Fringe, starring Jessica Martin and Jason Wood.

In 2011 he wrote the narration for A Christmas Carol Unplugged, an acoustic musical concert performance inspired by Charles Dickens' A Christmas Carol, produced by Awde and performed at the Union Chapel, Islington by Slade star Noddy Holder and musicians including Knox of The Vibrators.

The Tales of Malik-Mammed, a play written for children by Bartlett inspired by Azerbaijani fairy tales, ran at Chelsea Theatre in March 2015 as part of the Buta Festival, produced by Aloff Theatre.

Since 2017, Bartlett has collaborated with the Alhambra Theatre, Morecambe. A new version of Little Red Riding Hood, written by Bartlett, was performed there as part of the theatre's Morecambe Fringemas Festival in December 2017 and in workshops with local schools. A Christmas Carol Unplugged was also performed at the 2017 Fringemas Festival. An adaptation by Bartlett of Jules Verne's Around the World in Eighty Days was performed at the Alhambra's Story Festival in March 2018 and at the Morecambe Steampunk Festival "A Splendid Day Out" in June 2018.

== Other works ==
In February 2014 a short radio play Fifty-Fifty, written by Bartlett, was broadcast on BBC Radio 3 in The Verb's drama strand.

Bartlett has also written for the BBC Radio 4 comedy series Bearded Ladies (radio show).

As a feature writer, sub-editor and reviewer, Bartlett has contributed to publications including Radio Times, Heat and New Woman, he is currently the Duty Editor for planning on BBC Homepage. He has written articles and theatre reviews for The Stage since 1999.
