= Star Stories =

- Country of origin: United Kingdom
- No. of series: 3
- No. of episodes: 15

Production
- Executive producers: Phil Clarke and Andrew O'Connor
- Running time: 30 minutes
- Production company: Objective Productions

Original release
- Network: Channel 4
- Release: 15 September 2006 – 7 September 2008

Related
- The Kevin Bishop Show

Star Stories is a British television comedy programme that takes a satirical look at celebrities and their lives. It was first shown on Channel 4 on 15 September 2006 and aired its final series in 2008.

Star Stories is made by Objective Productions commissioned for Channel 4 by Shane Allen and Andrew Newman with Lee Hupfield producing, Elliot Hegarty directing and Phil Clarke and Andrew O'Connor as executive producers.

The Sun reported that Channel 4 had axed Star Stories to free up cash to invest in other shows.

The main theme of the show was the theme from the film Gone with the Wind.

== Cast ==
Cast member	Number of role(s)
Harry Peacock	24
Rick Astley; Bono; Dane Bowers; George Clooney; Colin Farrell; Chesney Hawkes; Kevin Federline; Jerome Flynn; Simon Fuller_{(series one)}; Peter Gabriel; Paul Gascoigne; David Jason; Vinnie Jones; Matt LeBlanc; Mark Wahlberg; Brian McFadden; Ewan McGregor; Jason Orange; Mike Read; Graham Taylor; Dave Lee Travis; Sylvester Stallone; Robin Williams; Ray Winstone
Kevin Bishop	20
Peter Andre; Tony Blair; Simon Cowell; Tom Cruise; Pete Doherty; Michael Douglas; Noel Edmonds; Alex Ferguson; God; Elton John; Val Kilmer; Andrew Lloyd Webber; Ewan McGregor; George Michael; Sean Penn; Brad Pitt; Cliff Richard; Colonel Sanders; Justin Timberlake; Robbie Williams
Steve Edge	19
Gary Barlow; Renate Blauel; Boy George; Mark Curry; Walt Disney; David Furnish; Noel Gallagher; Jamie Hince; Rod Hull; Paul McCartney; Freddie Mercury; Tony Mortimer; Ozzy Osbourne; Prince Charles; David Schwimmer; Sting; Patrick Swayze; John Travolta; Pete Waterman
Thaila Zucchi	18
Kirstie Alley; Victoria Beckham_{(in Katie Price episode)}; Cilla Black; Kelly Brook; Courteney Cox; Linda Evangelista; Geri Halliwell; Kerry Katona; Annie Lennox; Lindsay Lohan; Jennifer Lopez; Lulu; Stella McCartney; Yoko Ono; Sharon Osbourne; Queen Elizabeth II; Vivienne Westwood; Paula Yates
Fergus Craig	15
Russell Brand; Declan Donnelly; Jason Donovan; Eminem; Gareth Gates; Stephen Gately; Bob Geldof_{(in Bono episode)}; Calvin Klein; Nigel Martin-Smith; Sam Neill; Ian Paisley; Pope John Paul II; Prince Philip; Prince William; Tim Rice; Charlie Sheen
Tom Basden	14
Michael Barrymore; Tom Cruise; Jefferson Hack; Dustin Hoffman; Ron Howard; John Lennon; John Leslie; Piers Morgan; Gary Neville; Steven Spielberg; Rod Stewart; Bernie Taupin; Midge Ure; Will Young
Daisy Beaumont	14
Paula Abdul; Victoria Beckham; Renate Blauel; Cindy Crawford; Penélope Cruz; Sadie Frost_{(in Kate Moss episode)}; Elizabeth Hurley; Angelina Jolie; Demi Moore; Madonna_{(in Bono episode)}; Mimi Rogers; Vanessa Paradis; Britney Spears; Catherine Zeta-Jones; Katie Price
Alex Woodhall	13
Gerry Adams; Danny DeVito; Robson Green; Brian Harvey; Noddy Holder; Mick Hucknall; Simon Le Bon; John Lydon; Mark Owen; Prince; Ringo Starr; Gianni Versace; Louis Walsh
Rhys Thomas	12
Warren Beatty; Daniel Day-Lewis; Simon Fuller; Gareth Gates; Richard Gere; Gary Glitter; Jude Law; Matthew Perry; Andrew Ridgeley; Kiefer Sutherland; Jonathan Wilkes; Henry Winkler
Dolly Wells	12
Jennie Bond; Melanie C; Kim Cattrall; Nicole Kidman; Cameron Diaz; Lisa Kudrow; Madonna; Heather Mills; Gwyneth Paltrow; Camilla Parker Bowles; Princess Diana; Christy Turlington
Laura Patch	11
Kate Moss; Christina Aguilera; Jennifer Aniston; Sarah Harding; Nicole Appleton; Emma Bunton; Katie Holmes; Paris Hilton; Shirlie Holliman; Rebecca Loos; Trudie Styler
Tom Meeten	11
Antonio Banderas; Johnny Depp; Howard Donald; Kirk Douglas; Robert Downey Jr.; Liam Gallagher; George Harrison_{(in Heather Mills episode)}; Saddam Hussein; Stanley Kubrick; Michael Jackson; Chris Martin
Trevor Lock	8
Guy Chambers; Phil Collins; Emilio Estevez; Glenn Hoddle; Ant McPartlin; Michael Parkinson; Billy Bob Thornton; Ruud van Nistelrooy
Oliver Maltman	6
Anthony Hopkins; David Beckham; George Harrison; Bob Geldof; Sean Pertwee; Telly Savalas
Kobna Holdbrook-Smith	7
Michael Jackson; Nelson Mandela; Kofi Annan; Dr. Dre; Snoop Dogg; Stevie Wonder; Dwight Yorke
Matt King	4
Guy Ritchie; Elton John; Terry Venables; Gary Kemp
Rosalyn Wright	4
Mel B; Naomi Campbell; Pepsi Demacque; Sinitta
Kate Drew	2
Melanie C; Sadie Frost
Alice Lowe	1
Madonna
Jo Bourne Taylor	1
The Nanny_{(in Sadie Frost episode)}

Guest Starring:

- Harry Enfield: Elvis Costello.

Narration was commonly by Simon Greenall. However, the second and fourth episodes of the first series, the first and third episodes in the second series and the first, second and third episodes of the third series were narrated by Steve Edge, Matt King, Dolly Wells and Kevin Bishop in the guise of the lead characters George Michael, Guy Ritchie, Gary Barlow, Simon Cowell, Elton John, Heather Mills and Peter Andre respectively.

== Awards and nominations ==
Year	Award	Category	Nominee	Result
2006	British Comedy Awards	Best New Comedy	Star Stories	Won
2006	British Comedy Awards	Best Newcomer	Kevin Bishop	Nominated
2008	BAFTA TV Award	Best Comedy Programme	Lee Hupfield, Elliot Hegarty, Kevin Bishop, Philip Clarke	Nominated

== Viewing figures ==
- Episode one: 3 million (14%)
- Episode two: 2.6 million (11%)
- Episode three: 2.9 million (13%)
- Episode four: 3.1 million (14%)
  - Average: 2.8 million (13%)

The show's second series attracted over 2 million viewers.

== Episodes ==
=== Series One, 2006 ===
1. David & Victoria - 'Our Story'
2. George Michael - 'Watch Without Prejudice vol.1'
3. Catherine Zeta-Jones - 'Her Quest To Prove Herself... And Also Find Love'
4. Guy Ritchie & Madonna - 'The Wife's Life'
5. Sadie Frost - 'My Side Of The Story'
6. Jennifer Aniston - 'The One Where Jen's Husband Dumps Her For A Total Bitch'

=== Series Two, 2007 ===
1. Take That - 'Barlow Productions Presents: Take That - Why Our Success Was Nothing To Do With Robert Williams'
2. Tom Cruise - The Church of Scientology Presents: 'Being Tom Cruise - How Scientology Isn't In Any Way Mental'
3. Simon Cowell - SyCo Productions Presents: 'Simon Cowell - My Honesty, My Genius'
4. Britney Spears - The State of Louisiana Presents: 'The Ballad of Britney Jean'

=== Series Three, 2008 ===
1. Elton John - David Furnish Presents Elton John 'The Patron Saint of Celebrities'
2. Heather Mills - Heather Mills Presents Mills and McCartney 'Why Paul is a total bastard'
3. Peter Andre and Jordan (Katie Price) - Peter Andre Presents Me and Katie 'How the moneymoon never ends'
4. Kate Moss - Top Shop Presents Kate Moss 'My rise, fall, rise, fall again and then rise'
5. Bono - Bono Presents Christ 2 'My story'

== DVD releases ==
In the UK, a DVD containing all six episodes from Series One, an on-set diary, outtakes, music videos, deleted scenes and rehearsals was released on 30 July 2007. The second series was released on DVD on 17 November 2008. A box set was also released on the same day containing both series. A DVD containing all five episodes from Series Three was released on 27 July 2009.

== Overseas ==
In the United States, Star Stories began airing on BBC America on 15 August 2008.

In Australia it is shown on ABC1 and repeated on ABC2.
