= Wensley Clarkson =

English writer

George Wensley Clarkson (born September 1956) is an English true crime writer, biographer, novelist, and television writer and producer.

== Selected publications ==
- Hit ’Em Hard: Jack Spot, King of the Underworld
- Moody: The Life and Crimes of Britain's Most Notorious Hitman
- Killing Charlie
- One Behind the Ear
- Armed Robbery
- Hash
- The Curse of Brink's-Mat
- Car Trouble: A Childhood On Four Wheels
- Public Enemy No. 1
- The Railroad Killer
- The Mother's Day Murder
- Women Behind Bars
- The Good Doctor
- Gang Wars of London - How the Streets of the Capital Became a Battleground
- Vanessa: A Portrait of Evil
- Kenny Noye: Public Enemy No 1 (Blake's True Crime Library)
- Gang Wars on the Costa
- The Mother From Hell - She Murdered Her Daughters and Turned Her Sons into Murderers
- Costa del Crime
- Billy Hill: Godfather of London - The Unparalleled Saga of Britain's Most Powerful Post-War Crime Boss
- Gangs of Britain: The Gripping True Stories of the Faces Who Run Britain's Organised Crime
- The Boss
- Hitman
- Deadly Seduction
- Bindon
- Armed and Dangerous
- The Devil's Work
- Doctors of Death: Ten True Crime Stories of Doctors Who Kill
- Slave Girls: The Shocking World of Human Bondage
- Tom Cruise: Unauthorized. Hastings House, 1998.
- Cocaine Confidential (2014)
- Legal Highs (2015)
- Sexy Beasts (2016)
- Killing Goldfinger (2017)
