= Lance Mulcahy =

Australian composer

Lance Mulcahy (17 April 1931 – 26 January 1995) was an Australian-born composer of musicals and revue.

== Biography ==
Mulcahy began his career in the 1950s writing for intimate revue, notably for the Phillip Street Theatre in Sydney. In the UK, he contributed to the West End revues Pieces of Eight (1959), On The Brighter Side (1961) and One Over The Eight (1961). He co-wrote (with Emrys Bryson) the song "One Day", recorded by Matt Monro.

He composed the chamber musical Park with book and lyrics by Paul Cherry, which played on Broadway at the John Golden Theatre in April 1970.

His revue Shakespeare's Cabaret, which he conceived of and composed to words of Shakespeare, was performed at the off-Broadway Colonnades Theatre and transferred to the Bijou Theatre on Broadway in early 1981. Mulcahy was nominated for a Tony Award for Best Original Score for the music to Shakespeare's Cabaret.

His partner was the British theatre designer Desmond Heeley, who died in June 2016.
