= Being Tom Cruise =

- Star Stories episode
- Title card
- Episode no.: Series 2 Episode 2
- Directed by: Elliot Hegarty
- Written by: Lee Hupfield, Bert Tyler-Moore, George Jeffrie
- Cinematography by: Pete Rowe
- Editing by: Mark Davies
- Original air date: 2 August 2007

Episode chronology
← Previous "Gary Barlow Productions Presents: Take That - Why Our Success Was Nothing To Do With Robert Williams"	Next → "Simon Cowell - My Honesty, My Genius"

"The Church of Scientology Presents: Being Tom Cruise, Why Scientology Isn't in Any Way Mental" is a satirical spoof documentary from the series Star Stories, parodying the life of Tom Cruise and his relationship with the Church of Scientology. It is episode 2 of the second series of Star Stories, and first aired on Channel 4 on 2 August 2007. The show recounts Cruise's time with a group of some of his early acting friends. After filming Top Gun, Cruise (Kevin Bishop) is introduced to Scientology by John Travolta (Steve Edge), who convinces him to join the organization by smashing Cruise over the head with a shovel. He meets Nicole Kidman (Dolly Wells) and they start a relationship. After dating Penélope Cruz, Cruise is introduced to Katie Holmes (Laura Patch) by Travolta. Holmes agrees to marry Cruise, and the program ends with a voiceover asking the viewer to visit a Scientology website and purchase expensive products.

The program received positive reception, and The Guardian and the Evening Times highlighted it as the "pick of the day". The Daily Mirror described it as a "brilliant spoof", and The Sunday Times characterized the show as "Comedy so broad it barely fits on the screen, it is hard not to be amused". The Herald Sun called it a "ruthless but spot-on parody".

== Plot ==
The parody of Tom Cruise (Kevin Bishop) is framed through the viewpoint of the actor's association with the Church of Scientology. The show recounts the actor's days with a group of actors known as the Brat Pack, and his relationships with brothers Emilio Estevez and Charlie Sheen, Kiefer Sutherland, (Rhys Thomas) as well as with Patrick Swayze (Steve Edge), an actor from this crowd. (Brat Pack is a nickname given to a group of young actors and actresses who frequently appeared together in teen-oriented coming-of-age films in the 1980s; Cruise has been referred to as a member due to his role in the film The Outsiders.) While filming Top Gun, Cruise is afraid he looks "a bit gay" next to his co-stars. His co-stars subsequently turn into the Village People. Cruise has alien spirit guides who appear as "a pair of giant blobs who speak with Welsh accents". They comment on Top Gun, "It's no ET but it's got something." Cruise is introduced to Scientology by John Travolta (Steve Edge), who presents it as a "legitimate alien-race-based religion". After Travolta bashes him over the head with a shovel, Cruise remarks: "Ouch. . . wait a minute. Scientology. It all makes perfect sense now." Ewan McGregor tries to convince Cruise to convert to the Jedi methodology.

Meanwhile, Kidman decides to immigrate to the U.S. and marry Cruise to become “Hollywood king and queen”. When Cruise first meets Nicole Kidman (Dolly Wells), he asks her to sit down so that he will appear taller. She later fixes his teeth and he gets cast in Top Gun. Cruise performs his "dangling-from-the ceiling routine" from Mission: Impossible – while in bed with Kidman. Cruise asks Kidman how he can prove he is not gay, and she recommends that they make the film Eyes Wide Shut. Stanley Kubrick is portrayed as a sleazy film director, and the program shows a newspaper headline giving a critical review of Eyes Wide Shut. Cruise later gets a call from Sam Neill revealing Kidman’s plan and they subsequently divorce. The show portrays Cruise's relationship with Penélope Cruz, who is seen wearing a mantilla. Travolta introduces Cruise to his third wife Katie Holmes (Laura Patch) who is depicted as a robotic Stepford Wife. "Greetings, Earth Man, I am here to serve you," says Holmes to Cruise upon their first meeting. After Cruise asks Holmes to marry him, she states, "Affirmative". The show makes fun of Cruise's couch jumping incident on The Oprah Winfrey Show. (This spoof is in reference to a 2005 appearance by Cruise on the Oprah program, where he "jumped around the set, hopped onto a couch, fell to one knee and repeatedly professed his love for his new girlfriend.") At the wedding of Cruise and Holmes, an alien bride and groom are displayed on the top of the couple's wedding cake, and the show spoofs the couple's wedding vows. A voiceover at the end of the program tells the viewer to visit scientologyisgreat.com and purchase £4,000 worth of books.

== Production ==
Comedian Kevin Bishop as parody of actor Tom Cruise

Production on the second series of Star Stories was announced by Channel 4 in January 2007, and in addition to Tom Cruise, others set for parodying included Simon Cowell, Britney Spears and "the 1990s chart battle between Oasis and Blur". The show was episode two of the second series of Star Stories. The episode was first broadcast on Channel 4 on 2 August 2007. On its website, Channel 4 promoted the episode with the description, "Hollywood's smallest actor (after Danny DeVito) expounds on Aliens from Outer Space and the best career choices ever." In August 2007, the series was set to be remade into a new version in the U.S.

=== Legal issues ===
Multiple publications commented on the potential legal implications of parodying both Tom Cruise and Scientology. "Given the Church of Scientology's full-throttle reaction to any criticism or mickey-taking, the Star Stories boys are sure to find themselves in the firing line," wrote a reviewer for the Evening Times. A review in The Sunday Times commented, "Taking their careers in their hands, the Star Stories team tackle the notoriously litigious Tom Cruise ... The lawyers must still be having a nice lie down after watching."

In an interview with The Northern Echo, Star Stories actor Kevin Bishop discussed the legal issues involved with making the series: "We're not allowed to say anything about anyone that isn't true. It can be quite tricky. Sometimes we've had to change lines even when the filming is all finished. We go back to the recording studio and put one line over another line. ... The only reason I reckon we've not been sued is because actually we've not said anything that technically we can't." He said the series was "well looked after" by attorneys. In a 2009 interview with The Independent, Bishop recounted an experience when he gave a copy of the program to television producers in the United States: "I gave some American producers the Star Stories DVD and those that could be bothered to watch it saw the Tom Cruise one. One guy went 'you can't do that it's Tom Cruise man? [we’ve done it] 'yeah but you can't do that on TV' [it's already gone out] 'what you’re talking about Scientology, are you fucking nuts?? [er, look we’ve done it it's been on telly and everyone loved and we've had no complaints] has Tom Cruise seen this?!"

== Reception ==
The Guardian and the Evening Times highlighted the Star Stories parody as the "pick of the day". Martin Skeggs of The Guardian commented, "There's everything you ever wanted to know about the world's number one film star, including how he was introduced to Scientology (John Travolta whacked him over the head with a shovel), the time he met Nicole Kidman and asked her if she would mind sitting down to make him look taller". He characterized the parody as, "A toned down version of real life, then." Barry McDonald of the Evening Times described the episode as "equally cruel and sidesplittingly hilarious". He commented, "This is as close to must-watch television as you're likely to get and a testament to the quality of comedy writing on display." In a later review of the program for the Evening Times when it was shown again on re-runs, McDonald wrote, "I don't care if it's been shown several times before, this is one of the shows which you just have to see again." Aidan Smith of Scotland on Sunday wrote favorably of the show, and noted, "Fearlessly, in view of how paranoid Scientologists are, the latest target was Tom Cruise. I especially liked the scene where the tiny screen giant winched himself, Mission Impossible-style, on to Nicole Kidman while she slugged from a tinnie like a good Sheila."

The Daily Mirror described the program as "far too funny". A review in The Daily Mirror was positive, commenting, "If you want to see a brilliant spoof about Tom Cruise's faith in Scientology and his relationship with Katie Holmes, look no further than C4's Star Stories." She commented, "It's so absurd, even Tom will laugh." The Advertiser described Star Stories as "a surprisingly funny sendup of movie stars and pop groups", and noted of the episode's title, "This week's episode is titled Being Tom Cruise - How Scientology isn't in Any Way Mental, which should give you some idea of the vein of humour mined." The Sunday Times observed, "Just when you thought you might go a week without seeing a mention of brand Beckham, here is a documentary on their best friends, brand Tom Cruise, as recorded by the least reverential writers and least convincing lookalikes on the planet. Scientologists might prefer something on the Sci-fi channel." Victoria Segal, Sally Kinnes and Sarah Dempster of The Sunday Times highlighted the episode in their "Critics' Choice" column. They commented that the show's producers "[give] their own account of his career, his love life and his religion: It's all about aliens. Comedy so broad it barely fits on the screen, it is hard not to be amused". Cameron Adams of the Herald Sun highlighted the program as his "Top Choice". Adams commented, "This ruthless but spot-on parody re-enacts Cruise's life and career through Hollywood gossip, rumour and exaggeration (his father is a midget, Katie Holmes a robot, Nicole Kidman a beer-swilling bogan), but is an antidote to every interview he's ever done." Writing for The Newcastle Herald, Anita Beaumont commented, "This is really silly stuff, but it is amusing enough to enliven a fairly dull night of TV." The Sunday Mirror wrote that the program "was as subtle as a sledge hammer". Simon Hoggart of The Spectator called the program "a magnificently over-the-top anti-celebrity festival".

== See also ==
- Relationship of Tom Cruise and Katie Holmes
- Scientology in popular culture
- Tom Cruise: Unauthorized (1998)
- Tom Cruise: All the World's a Stage (2006)
- Tom Cruise: An Unauthorized Biography (2008)
- Trapped in the Closet (South Park)
