= Tom Cruise: An Unauthorized Biography =

2008 book by Andrew Morton

- Book cover, hardcover ed.
- Author: Andrew Morton
- Cover artist: Rene Johnston; Ken Lennox
- Subject: Tom Cruise
- Publisher: St. Martin's Press
- Publication date: January 15, 2008
- Publication place: United States
- Media type: Print (Hardcover and Paperback)
- Pages: 352
- ISBN: 0-312-35986-1
- OCLC: 177004834

Tom Cruise: An Unauthorized Biography is an unauthorized biography of actor Tom Cruise, written by Andrew Morton. The book was published in the United States in hardcover format on January 15, 2008, by St. Martin's Press, with a first printing of 400,000 copies, and an audio format on five CDs by Macmillan Audio.

Cruise's lawyers and the Church of Scientology have released several statements which question the truthfulness of assertions made by Morton in the book. In an official 15-page statement released to the press, the Church called the book "a bigoted, defamatory assault replete with lies". The book was not published in the United Kingdom or New Zealand due to strict libel laws in those countries. Although initially not published in Australia, it was later published there and became popular.

The book hit number one on Amazon.com's list of top sellers three days after it was published, and was number one on The New York Times Best Seller list one week after publication. It was the number one bestseller in Australia for publisher AbeBooks in 2008. The book received mixed and critical reviews in The New York Times. The San Jose Mercury opined that it should be taken "with the proper grain of salt".

== Contents ==
Morton's book describes Cruise's relationship with Katie Holmes, his sexuality, and Cruise and Holmes' beliefs. Morton also asserts in the book that Holmes had to "audition" for the status of Cruise's girlfriend, and won the part over other actresses. The book also discusses details about Cruise's marriages to Mimi Rogers and Nicole Kidman, his relationship with Penélope Cruz, his behavior on The Oprah Winfrey Show, and his denunciation of Brooke Shields for using anti-depressants to help her cope with postpartum depression. Morton consulted a former senior Scientologist, who asserted that Kidman's lawyer had advised her not to publicly discuss Scientology or to speak out against it, even though she "hated" Scientology when Cruise left her in 2000. Morton's source stated "I told the lawyer if she wants to stay with the children she will have to be quiet and not speak out about Scientology." Morton writes that Holmes joined Scientology in June 2006, and agreed that "if she or any of her children were ever to suffer mental or terminal illness, they must turn only to Scientology's treatments". Morton asserts that model Sofia Vergara stopped seeing Cruise in 2005 weeks before he met Holmes, and Vergara felt "she had been deliberately targeted not only as a possible bride for Tom, but as a high-profile Scientology recruit who would be an alluring figurehead for a future recruitment drive in Latin America".

Morton asserts in the book that Cruise is the "de facto second-in-charge" in the Church of Scientology. When asked by the Associated Press what evidence he had about this, Morton stated "Scientology would be a shadow of what it is today if it had not been for the involvement of Tom Cruise. He has been the poster boy. More than that, he has been recruiting fellow celebrities - people like Will Smith, Jada Pinkett Smith. ... More than that, he's been the front man for the organization."

Morton writes that Church of Scientology leader David Miscavige consults Cruise on "every aspect of planning and policy," that Miscavige joined Cruise and Holmes on their 2006 honeymoon in the Maldives, and that Church of Scientology officials select many of the employees that staff Cruise's mansion. According to Morton, Miscavige invited Cruise to the Church of Scientology's Gold Base in Hemet, California in 1989.

Kidman and Cruise were invited to Gold Base in 1990 after spending time together on the set of Days of Thunder. Morton writes "When Tom confided to the Scientology leader about the couple's fantasy of running through a meadow of wild flowers together, his friend apparently decided to make his dream come true." Morton writes that around the same time Cruise was beginning his relationship with Rogers, Miscavige made an announcement at a Church of Scientology rally, "The most important recruit ever is in the process of being secured. His arrival will change the face of Scientology forever."

== Research ==
According to Morton, he began researching Tom Cruise after publishing his best-selling book on Princess Diana, Diana: Her True Story. Morton stated that he became interested in writing about the actor after watching Cruise jump on Oprah's couch during a May 23, 2005 appearance on The Oprah Winfrey Show, and lecture Matt Lauer on his beliefs regarding psychiatry during a June 24, 2005 appearance on The Today Show "I wondered: what is a 43-year-old man, who has been married twice before to women he has said were the loves of his life, with his son and daughter watching, doing behaving in this fashion — all because of Katie Holmes, a woman he has known for a matter of days? ... What was going on? I wanted to know more."

In an interview with the Associated Press, Morton stated that he asked Cruise for an interview, but was turned down: "I asked Tom for an interview and he declined. The Church of Scientology has got a very controversial reputation and that is what he is linked with. An unauthorized biography would essentially be a compromise … I want to investigate it without any kind of fetters." Morton consulted with private investigator and former adult film actor Paul Baressi, who investigated Cruise's private life. He also consulted with Los Angeles, California attorney Graham Berry. Baressi stated he had begun investigating Cruise after his marriage to Nicole Kidman ended, but after six years of research on the actor had not been able to find any evidence that Cruise was gay. Baressi gave all of his research to Morton, and later told InTouch magazine: "Everything I have found, and everything I know, points to Tom being heterosexual." Morton also traveled to Toronto, Ontario, Canada to interview people who knew Cruise when he was filming Cocktail. Several Paramount Pictures employees were interviewed about Cruise's termination by Sumner Redstone. The book had initially been planned for a February 2006 publication date.

Prior to the book's publication, legal counsel for Cruise made statements to the press regarding the author's research. When an attorney for Tom Cruise read reports that Morton had obtained letters asserting Cruise had a homosexual affair while filming Eyes Wide Shut, he commented on a November 2005 letter he had written to Morton: "I wrote a letter to Mr. Morton back in November and said he obviously was entitled to write the book but 'make sure you check your facts'. If he tries to use my letter to create the impression that Mr. Cruise did have a gay affair, we will certainly sue … because the story is false. Mr. Cruise is not gay." In an interview with InTouch Weekly, Cruise's attorney Bertram Fields commented on the book: "To the extent that Mr. Morton's book sticks to the truth, it can't 'ruin' or 'harm' Tom … My guess is this book will be dull except for those parts that are lies." Cruise's publicist also stated that the book will consist of fabricated lies.

== Media coverage ==
On November 11, 2007, the Daily Express reported that Andrew Morton had gone into hiding due to threats from Scientologists related to his work on the book. Morton was quoted as stating: "I have received threats from the Scientologists and things have become pretty heavy — to the extent that it's almost more than my lawyers can handle … I’m not telling anyone where I’m moving to. I intend to disappear for a while." This quote was later repeated in other media sources. On November 23, 2007, the Daily Express issued an apology to the Church of Scientology. The paper stated that their original piece about threats from Scientologists to Morton was incorrect, and wrote: "We apologise to the Church of Scientology and its members for the embarrassment and distress caused by the article." A December 2007 article in the New York Post stated: "Mumbles out of London say Morton changed his phone number, moved from his home and lived in a secret place because Certain Persons were hassling him."

When St. Martin's Press heard of a November 2007 InTouch Weekly cover story on the contents of the book, the publisher responded by stating that InTouch had not received an advance copy of Tom Cruise: An Unauthorized Biography and was simply speculating. Brian Smith of St. Martin's Press was interviewed for the InTouch article, and commented on the book: "No one has dared to write a book like this. So it's going to really be dealing with stuff no one has written about before."

== Response from Cruise and Church of Scientology ==
The Daily Telegraph reported that lawyers for Cruise were preparing a lawsuit against publisher St. Martin's Press, seeking US$113 million in damages. Eliot Abelson, general counsel for the Church of Scientology, discussed the possibility of litigation from the Church in statements to the Daily Mail. An article in The Times wrote "The Church of Scientology is reported to be considering filing suit against the US publishers."

The book has been criticized by representatives for both Tom Cruise and the Church of Scientology. In an interview with The Daily Mail, attorney Bertram Fields called the book a "boring, poorly researched book by a man who never talked to anyone involved in Tom Cruise's life or anyone close to him," and criticized what he believed to be Morton's lack of independent research for the work. Fields said that Cruise would not read the book, saying "He has no intention of reading it. He's very, very busy with a lot of things right now." Paula Wagner, Tom Cruise's business partner in their company Cruise/Wagner Productions, released a statement supporting Cruise and criticizing Morton's work. Wagner called the book "a disgraceful piece of gossip-mongering, filled with distortions and outright lies that no sensible person will take seriously".

Eliot Abelson said that the Church had attempted to contact Morton and give him a tour, but "received nothing". Abelson stated "This was a pre-ordained mission to trash Tom Cruise. He didn't ask to speak to David Miscavige and wrote some horrible things about him which are totally untrue. No one has ever made complaints of that kind," and denied that Cruise was second-in-command of the Church of Scientology "He is a parishioner, a well respected parishioner, but that's what he is. The only person who runs the Church and makes policy decisions is David Miscavige." "It's not too late for St. Martin's Press to pull this book," Abelson said.

On January 14, 2008, Church of Scientology public affairs director Karin Pouw released a 15-page statement criticizing the book. In the statement, the Church of Scientology called the book "a bigoted, defamatory assault replete with lies," and said that Cruise "is a Scientology parishioner and holds no official or unofficial position in the Church hierarchy," and that "Accuracy and truth were not on Morton's agenda." Cruise's publicity firm Rogers & Cowan, also issued a statement, which criticized Morton for not interviewing "one person who has known or worked with Tom" in the past 25 years, and also criticized Morton for writing "outlandish and malicious lies to sell books".

In January 2008, Jenna Miscavige Hill (the niece of David Miscavige) released a statement on the internet in favor of Morton's book. Hill stated: "I am absolutely shocked at how vehemently you insist upon not only denying the truths that have been stated about the church in that biography, but then take it a step further and tell outright lies." Hill's statement was part of an open letter to a Church of Scientology official which described how her family had been broken apart by Scientology policies. In response, Karin Pouw told the Agence France-Presse "The church stands by its statement of 14 January. The church does not respond to newsgroup postings." Hill told the Agence France-Presse that she had released the statement in a public forum to draw attention to the Scientology practice of disconnection.

The book's publisher, St. Martin's Press, called the possibility of a lawsuit from Tom Cruise and the Church of Scientology "unfortunate", stating "It is unfortunate that lawyers for both Mr. Cruise and Scientology have felt the need to threaten us with legal action at every step of the way." In a statement to Usmagazine.com the publisher supported Morton's research on the book: "In the two years that we have worked with Andrew Morton on this book, we have been deeply impressed by his commitment to going beyond the rumors to get the facts that would enable him to paint a balanced and accurate portrait of such an enigmatic public figure."

== Reception ==
=== Sales ===
In November 2007, Irish On-Line reported that the book would not be published in the United Kingdom, because it was anticipated not to contain anything "sensational" about Cruise that would make it a blockbuster. An article in the New York Post attributed this to the "scandalous" nature of the book, and what the paper referred to as "UK's celebrity-friendly libel laws". For similar reasons the book was not published by major booksellers in New Zealand and Australia, though an underground market for the book sprung up on auction site eBay there; the book was also available in some Australian independent bookstores, with buyers having to pay a significant premium on the cover price. Copies of the book sold for over A$60 on eBay Australia, and one eBay seller commented "These things don't happen too often. The book has generated so much attention and the more people are hearing about it, the more that they want to buy it. The censorship factor has also had a major impact."

The book hit number nine on Amazon.com's list of top sellers the day it was published in the United States, and was at the number one spot three days after publication. Lycos reported that Internet searches for "Tom Cruise" jumped 333 percent the week the book was published. The book hit number one on The New York Times Best Sellers list one week after it was published, and as of February 3, 2008 it was still at the top of the list for hardback non-fiction. As of January 25, 2008, the book was number 16 on Amazon.com's top sellers. On January 31, 2008 the book was listed at number three in non-fiction on a list of "Publishers Weekly Best-Sellers" by the Associated Press, and reached the fifth-highest new entry on Nielsen BookScan's survey in February 2008. Though certain bookstores in Australia refused to sell the book due to legal concerns, it was the number one bestseller in Australia for on-line bookseller AbeBooks in 2008, and the number one most-borrowed non-fiction book at libraries in Brisbane in September 2008.

=== Reviews ===
The book received a mixed review in The New York Times, with Janet Maslin writing that "Mr. Morton has found a number of former Scientologists who are willing to speak freely, and in some cases vengefully, about the group’s purported inner workings. Mr. Morton’s eagerness to include their voices leads him to push the limits of responsible reporting." She also stated that Morton, while "readily assailable" for some of his remarks in the book, "is in some larger sense an astute observer. His overall impression of Mr. Cruise makes sense." In a separate review, Ada Calhoun of The New York Times wrote that Morton "…champions the indignation of mostly anonymous former Scientologists in this brutal biography of the controversial religion’s most famous advocate, Tom Cruise", noted that "many attributed quotations lack sources", and concluded her review with the observation that at times the book "feels about as reliable as the tabloids and yet, astonishingly, somehow meaner." Writing in Entertainment Weekly, Mark Harris gave the book a grade of "C−", and said "Cruise emerges from Morton's takedown moderately scratched but as uncracked as ever."

Teresa Budasi of the Chicago Tribune described the book as "fascinating" — though Budasi also brought up a "question as to what’s true and what isn’t." Budasi summed up her impression of the work, writing "Morton’s book is as much an indictment on Cruise’s chosen faith as it is the life story of one of the world’s biggest movie stars. And by the end you realize that “Scientologist” is what will end up being the role of his lifetime."

Reviewing the book in The Wall Street Journal, Dave Shiflett said that Morton portrayed Cruise as "a top-gun Scientologist who is up to no good," and that "Mr. Morton, apparently unfazed by the reputation of the group's notoriously hair-triggered legal department, leaves few stones unhurled." Stefanie Roberts of The Independent Florida Alligator wrote "Author Andrew Morton's narrative, though for the most part irritatingly unbiased, does a fair job of reaffirming how far gone Cruise truly is." Roberts wrote that the book would have drawn in more readers if it had "taken a few more obvious jabs at Cruise." Writing in the San Jose Mercury News, Tony Hicks criticized parts of the work, and recommended that it be taken "with the proper grain of salt". Hicks wrote that "Holes and all, it's a hard book to put down, especially with wild tales of Scientology spilling forth page after page. The entertainment value falls off toward book's end, when Morton attempts to wrap up his story with some editorializing and a diagnosis of both Cruise and his religion that, while seeming accurate to a degree, nevertheless comes off preachy."

== See also ==
- Being Tom Cruise
- Relationship of Tom Cruise and Katie Holmes
- Trapped in the Closet (South Park)
- Tom Cruise: Unauthorized (1998)
- Tom Cruise: All the World's A Stage (2006)
