= Tom Cruise: Unauthorized =

1998 non-fiction book by Wensley Clarkson

- Book cover
- Author: Wensley Clarkson
- Language: English
- Subject: Biography
- Genre: Non-fiction
- Publisher: Hastings House
- Publication date: January 25, 1998
- Pages: 483
- ISBN: 978-0-8038-9406-8
- OCLC: 37213499
- Followed by: Cruise Control

Tom Cruise: Unauthorized is an unauthorized non-fiction biographical book about Tom Cruise, written by Wensley Clarkson. The book was published by Hastings House in 1998. The book discusses Tom Cruise's early life, his rise as an actor, involvement with Scientology, and past relationships with Mimi Rogers and Nicole Kidman. The book ended during the filming of Eyes Wide Shut.

In 2003, Wensley Clarkson wrote another biography of Cruise, entitled: Cruise Control. Tom Cruise was interviewed on Larry King Live about that book, and stated: "Well, you can tell this guy doesn't know me."

== Publisher receives legal letter ==
After Tom Cruise's publicists discovered that the author was contacting individuals involved with the Church of Scientology in the course of his research on Cruise, an attorney for Cruise contacted the publisher of Tom Cruise: Unauthorized.

Attorney Bertram Fields' letter stated: "I represent Tom Cruise. I have been advised that you intend to publish a biography of Mr. Cruise. I believe that your book may contain numerous false and defamatory statements about Mr. Cruise. I urge you to check your facts very carefully before publication, since it is certainly Mr. Cruise's intention to institute an appropriate action should your book contain such statements." Though Clarkson's representatives at Hastings House urged Fields to have his client meet with the author so as to ensure the veracity of the statement in the book, Fields and Cruise did not reply to the publisher's offer.

== See also ==
- Being Tom Cruise
- Relationship of Tom Cruise and Katie Holmes
- Trapped in the Closet (South Park)
- Tom Cruise: All the World's A Stage (2006)
- Tom Cruise: An Unauthorized Biography (2008)
