= Tom Cruise: All the World's a Stage =

2006 biography

Tom Cruise: All the World's A Stage
- Author: Iain Johnstone
- Language: English
- Subject: Biography
- Genre: Non-fiction
- Publisher: Hodder & Stoughton
- Publication date: October 1, 2006
- Publication place: United States
- Media type: Paperback
- Pages: 344
- ISBN: 0-340-89921-2

Tom Cruise: All the World's A Stage is an authorized biography of actor Tom Cruise, written by British film critic Iain Johnstone. The book was first published by Hodder & Stoughton in a paperback format and an audiobook in 2006, and then again in a hardcover format on March 1, 2007, and a second paperback release, on May 1, 2007.

== Contents ==
Tom Cruise: All the World's A Stage details some of Cruise's early life, and his role as head of the family after his father left to become "an itinerant hippy in California." The author chronicles Cruise's film career, including his first role in Endless Love in 1981, his breakthrough in Risky Business, and other popular films such as Top Gun, Jerry Maguire and the Mission: Impossible films. He cites Cruise's role as "Frank Mackey" in the film Magnolia as one of his best performances. Johnstone also writes about Cruise's relationships with Mimi Rogers and Nicole Kidman, and the luxurious lifestyle maintained by Cruise and Kidman during their relationship. Johnstone puts Kidman in a sympathetic light regarding their 2001 divorce.

The book discusses Cruise's relationship with Scientology, and controversy in the media, including his public criticism of actress Brooke Shields, and his "TV sofa-bouncing." He also discusses the lengthy production of director Stanley Kubrick's Eyes Wide Shut, noting the fact that Universal Studios and Paramount Pictures allowed representatives from the Church of Scientology to frequent the film sets during production.

== Reception ==
Peter Bradshaw of The Guardian called the book "an unpretentious model of clarity and humility, simply rounding up the known facts." In his review of the 2006 edition of the book, Bradshaw wrote that Johnstone had presented a neutral overview of events in Cruise's life, and did not offer any strong opinions of his own in the book. He criticized the work for being "incurious about what it is like" to be Tom Cruise. In his review in The Independent, William Cook described the tone of the book as "respectful not reverential". Cook also wrote: "Johnstone's businesslike biog feels as if written at arm's length - but this distance allows him to state some awkward facts about Cruise's Scientology. It's hard to believe he could have been quite so frank in an authorised biography."

The book received a critical review in The West Australian, and a review in Australia's The Daily Telegraph thought the book was almost "dull". Christopher Bray of London's The Daily Telegraph also criticized the work, and wrote that the book failed to answer any of the "interesting questions", commenting: "You will read this book in vain for any suggestion that what we think we know of Cruise's real life might be no more than PR smoke and mirrors." In a review in The Spectator, Roger Lewis was critical of the book, and wrote: "The eulogies Johnstone collects are endless." Barbara Chabai of the Winnipeg Free Press also criticized the lack of depth to the work, writing that Johnstone "has simply repackaged facts from Cruise's interviews with other reporters into a neat but unfeeling tome that offers all the depth of an Entertainment Tonight feature." Both The Guardian and the Winnipeg Free Press noted the absence of any discussion or mention of the controversial 2005 episode of South Park which spoofed Cruise, "Trapped in the Closet".

== See also ==
- Being Tom Cruise
- Relationship of Tom Cruise and Katie Holmes
- Trapped in the Closet (South Park)
- Tom Cruise: Unauthorized (1998)
- Tom Cruise: An Unauthorized Biography (2008)
