= Azerbaijani fairy tales =

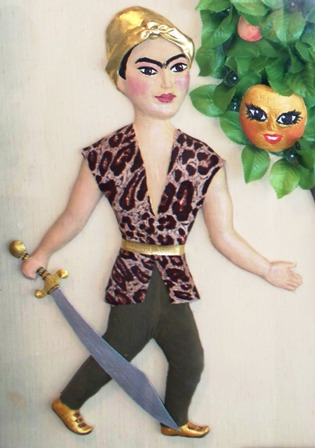
Malikmammad — main hero of an Azerbaijani fairy tale of the same name

Azerbaijani fairy tales are works of folklore by the Azerbaijani people. They vary in context and subject and include tales from the heroic past of the Azerbaijani people and struggles with local and foreign oppressors. Spiritual, moral, social and philosophical views are reflected throughout these tales.

The tales hand down ancient national traditions and customs whilst depicting the natural beauty of Azerbaijan; its green valleys and pastures, magnificent mountains, purling rivers and blossoming gardens.

== History ==
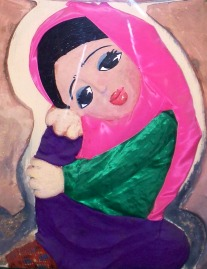
Goychak Fatma – one of the main heroines of Azerbaijani fairy tales

According to Horst Wilfrid Brands in Enzyklopädie des Märchens, there exists some connection between the narrative corpus of Azerbaijan and Turkey (even Turkmenistan).

The first recorded fairy tales are found in the heroic Oghuz Kitabi Dede Korkut ("The book of grandfather Korkut") of the 10th-11th centuries. For instance, there is a narrated tale about a monster-man who eats "two people and five thousand sheep" per day in Tepegoz's (a translation from Turkish – Cyclop) story.

== Characters ==
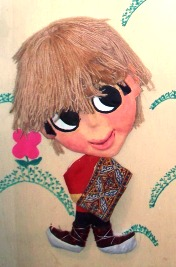
Jirtdan – one of the main heroes of Azerbaijani fairy tales

Jirtdan is the most popular fairy tale character among children's tales in Azerbaijan, meaning "small" when translated from Azerbaijani. Many fairy tales are based on this character, who is distinguished for his keenness of wit, courage and bravery. He can simultaneously be an idler, but also very brave. The Div ('giant') is another popular character. Little Jirtdan acquires courage and bravery when he meets Div.

Another popular character of the Azerbaijani tale corpus is hero Mälik Mähämmäd (or Mälikmämmäd).

== Types ==
Azerbaijani fairy tales are divided into three types in essence and content: fairy tales about animals, fairy tales about common people and magic fairy tales.

== Azerbaijani fairy tales abroad ==
The second edition of National fairy-tales from Azerbaijan was published by Verlag Dr.Koster Publishing House (Berlin) on the initiative of the Azerbaijani embassy in Germany. Liliane Grimm is an Austrian researcher of Azerbaijani studies and author and translator of the book, whose first acquaintance with Azerbaijan was held at an exhibition of Azerbaijani artists in Vienna. Seventeen national fairy tales of Azerbaijan and The Fox’s Pilgrimage (parable by Abdulla Shaig) were included in the book.

The Tales of Malik-Mammed, a play written for children by Chris Bartlett (writer) inspired by Azerbaijani fairy tales, ran at Chelsea Theatre in London in March 2015 as part of the Buta Festival.

== Characters ==
- Jirtdan
- Tig-tig khanim
- Tepegoz
- Malikmammad
- Ovchu Pirim
- Goychak Fatma

== See also ==
- Adventures of a Boy
- The Pomegranate Girl
- The Tale of Aftab

== Bibliography ==
- Brands, Horst Wilfrid. "Aserbaidschan" [Azerbaijan, Narrative Tradition in]. In: Enzyklopädie des Märchens Band 1: Aarne – Bayerischer Hiasl. Edited by Kurt Ranke; Hermann Bausinger; Wolfgang Brückner; Max Lüthi; Lutz Röhrich; Rudolf Schenda. De Gruyter, 2016 [1977]. pp. 861–865. ISBN 978-3-11-006781-1.
- Rüstəmzadə, İlkin (2013). Azərbaycan nağıllarının süjet göstəricisi (in Azerbaijani). Bakı: Elm və təhsil. (Classification of Azerbaijani fairy tales according to the Aarne-Thompson Index)

Folktale collections

- Зейналлы, Ханефи; Багрий, Александр Васильевич. "Азербайджанские тюркские сказки" [Fairy Tales of the Azerbaijani Turks]. Academia, 1935.
- Hermann, Alfred; Schwind, Martin (1951). Die Prinzessin von Samarkand: Märchen aus Aserbeidschan und Armenien (in German). Köln: Greven Verlag Köln. pp. 13-107 (9 Azeri tales).
- Ахундов, Ахлима. "Азербайджанские сказки" [Azerbaijani Fairy Tales]. Baku: Издательство Академии Наук Азербайджанской ССР, 1955.
- KÖKTÜRK, ŞAHİN (1996). Azerbaycan ve Türkiye'den derlenmiş masalların karşılaştırma denemesi [An Essay on the contrastative study of tale compiled from Azerbaijan and Türkiye] (Doctoral) (in Turkish). Ondokuz Mayis Üniversitesi.
- BİRDAL, ALİKADİR (2004). Kuzey Azerbaycan masalları üzerine bir inceleme (Masters) (in Turkish). Kafkas Üniversitesi.
- HAFIZOĞLU, ELİF BERRAK (2005). Masalların Propp metoduyla incelenmesi [A study of Azerian tales: Analyzing the tales with Propp method] (Masters) (in Turkish). Atatürk üniversitesi.
- Gülmez, Gülcan (2008). Güney Azerbaycan Erdebil bölgesindeki Türk halk masalları (metin-inceleme) [Turkish folk tales in south Azerbaijan Erdebil region (text-study)] (Thesis) (in Turkish). Ege Üniversitesi; Sosyal Bilimler Enstitüsü; Türk Dünyası Araştırmaları Ana Bilim Dalı; Türk Dünyası Edebiyatı Bilim Dalı.
- R. Seyfi Yurdakul, ed. (2017). Azerbaycan'dan Masallar: Azerbaycan Folklorundan Masal Örnekleri (in Turkish). Ankara: Millî Eğitim Bakanlığı. ISBN 978-975-11-4178-1.
- SARPKAYA, SEÇKİN (2020). Tebriz Türk masalları üzerinde bir inceleme [A study on Turkish folk tales in Tebriz-Iran] (Doctoral) (in Turkish). Ege Üniversitesi.
