= The Kevin Bishop Show =

- Genre: Comedy
- Directed by: Elliot Hegarty (2008); Dominic Brigstocke (2009)
- Starring: Kevin Bishop; Jim Howick; Katie Males; Oliver Maltman; Karen Gillan; Sam Hazeldine
- Theme music composer: Mark Thomas
- Opening theme: Groove Armada - Song 4 Mutya (Out of Control) (Pilot); Wiley - "Wearing My Rolex" (Series 1 and 2)
- Country of origin: United Kingdom
- Original language: English
- No. of series: 2
- No. of episodes: 12

Production
- Executive producers: Phil Clarke; Andrew O'Connor
- Producers: Lee Hupfield; Michael Livingstone (2008); Samantha Martin (2009)
- Editor: Mark Davies
- Running time: 30mins (inc. adverts)
- Production companies: Objective Productions; All3Media

Original release
- Network: Channel 4
- Release: 25 July 2008 – 4 September 2009

Related
- Star Stories; No Signal

The Kevin Bishop Show is a sketch comedy written by and starring English comedian Kevin Bishop, part of the Star Stories team. The show was commissioned by Channel 4 for a six-part series starting on 25 July 2008 at 10 p.m. A pilot was broadcast on 23 November 2007 as part of Channel 4's Comedy Showcase and the programme soon earned interest for its incredibly fast pace; 42 sketches were shown in 23 minutes. The show was nominated for Best New Comedy at the 2008 British Comedy Awards. The show started its second series on Friday 31 July 2009 at 10 p.m. on Channel 4.

== Overview ==
The sketch show is fast-paced and based on channel flicking through channels on Sky Digital. On screen is a replica of the Sky Search and Scan banner and TV guide. Unlike the pilot, the search and scan banner displays the date which is the same as the date the episode is being broadcast, with roughly the same time as it is being broadcast. There are many other TV presentation references throughout the show, mostly related to the TV channels the "shows" are on.

The show received 194 complaints to Channel 4, making it the second most complained about programme on Channel 4 during August 2008, after Big Brother 9. Several complaints were made regarding a musical parody of the Holocaust drama Sophie's Choice, as well as parodies of children's toys adverts on Channel 5, such as 'The 9/11 Playset' and 'The Terrorist Concentration Camp Playset'. A second series of the show was broadcast in July 2009.

The show was written by Bishop, producer Lee Hupfield (creator of Banzai), Paul Hupfield, Lisa Fishwick, Martin Delaney and writer/performer Les Keen.

The main cast members playing the various characters were Kevin Bishop, Jim Howick, Katie Males, Oliver Maltman, Karen Gillan and Sam Hazeldine.

== Sketches ==
There are many sketches on the show, parodying current TV adverts and shows. These include:

- Video game adverts for the Fony Playbox/slab (Wintendoh Piii in series 2), advertising Wii-style games that are based on useless or unusual activities, like anal sex and attracting a bartender's attention
- American, Welsh, Scottish and Australian remakes of British, American, Welsh, and Australian shows with stereotypical American, Welsh, Scottish and Australian twists. Such shows have included Last of the Summer Wine, SMTV Live, Border Security, Countdown, Friends, 'Allo 'Allo! (set in the Vietnam War and called 'Harrow Harrow' and then in a later episode, in the Afghan War as 'aloo aloo'), 'GMTV' and Grange Hill
- Movie trailers such as Dangerously High School Musical
- Imitating Hugh Laurie's Black Adder-style mannerisms in a parody of the TV Show "House, M. D."
- R'n'B music videos which sees Bishop dress up as a stereotypical rapper (blacked up)
- News 25, a news channel based on BBC News 24, renamed just News in series 2
- Nursery Crime Squad, an apparent ITV drama about police arresting fairytale characters for crimes such as blowing down the houses of three little pigs, and eating Red Riding Hood.
- The Charmer - a spoof of so-called 'sexy' ITV dramas. Bishop plays a ladies man who, while seducing an attractive young woman, finds himself inept at completing a simple task (i.e. putting a condom on), so he shouts 'MUM!' very loudly as a way of calling for the unseen character's help
- Free DVDs with The Daily Mail, such as 'Classic Movie Twists Ruined', 'Classic Times You've Sat On The Remote And Can't Find It' and 'Classic Films Remastered So The Nazis Win'.
- Adverts for perfumes by celebrities, like 'Bully' by Simon Cowell, 'Desperation' by Jodie Marsh, 'Publicity' by Sienna Miller, 'Mutton' by Madonna, 'Cheat' by Ashley Cole 'Recession' by Gordon Brown, 'Bollocks' by Gordon Ramsay, 'Hypocrite' by Cristiano Ronaldo, 'Nepotism' by Peaches Geldof, 'Greedy' by Kerry Katona, 'Botox' by Dannii Minogue, 'Bigot' by Nick Griffin, 'Typecast' by Daniel Radcliffe, 'Scum' by Jeremy Kyle, 'Riddles' by Little Ant & Dec and 'Cuckold' by Peter Andre
- The Mind cop which sees Bishop as a detective investigating crime scenes and acting out the incident. This always leads to him injuring and supposedly raping his colleague, ignoring the insistence that there were no sexual crimes and physical abuse involved. He often comments just before he is about to rape his colleague, "Then what happened? Oh, God no. Then you raped him, didn't you? You dirty fucking bastard".
- The Pun Detective who works out the series of events related to the victim. For example, when an ice cream man is murdered and his body is covered in various toppings, he says "He's topped himself!"
- Gary, a man who constantly imitates a radio announcer, even inviting 'listeners' to text or email in, which greatly annoys his girlfriend. During these sketches, "Eple" by the Norwegian electronic music group Röyksopp plays as background music. In August 2008, his girlfriend left him as a result of his actions, despite already telling him a few seconds ago she'll leave him if he continues with the charade
- On set with Colin Farrell, who always turns up naked, despite starring in children's films or merely providing a voice over
- A parody of Walkers Crisps under the name of Christopher Walken as 'Walkens Crisps', typically parodying one of the films he stars in such as The Deer Hunter
- A show called "Little Hitler" about Hitler as a boy in a Nazi uniform
- "The Trustafarians", a pair of upper middle-class gentlemen in their early twenties, expressing their perpetual and facetious annoyance at the various minor inconveniences in their lives usually related to monetary loss. Their catch-phrase is "...it's a bit annoying..."
- "Jesus Christ The Series" which usually involves something bad happening to somebody and they say Jesus Christ! only to see Jesus Christ next to them and usually says sorry, for example in one episode, a football team scored a goal. Their player shouted Jesus Christ! And Jesus was seen hanging from the goal in a crucifix position
- A "Die Hard" movie starring Bruce Forsyth instead of Bruce Willis, featuring the line "Yippee-ki-yay to see you, to see you, yippee-ki-yay".
- Adverts for Chums appearances by celebrities, like Simon Cowell, Jodie Marsh, Sienna Miller, Madonna, Ashley Cole, Gordon Brown, Gordon Ramsay, Cristiano Ronaldo, Peaches Geldof, Kerry Katona, Dannii Minogue, Nick Griffin, Daniel Radcliffe, Jeremy Kyle, Little Ant & Dec and Peter Andre

== Awards and nominations ==
Year	Award	Category	Nominee	Result
2008	British Comedy Awards	Best New Comedy	The Kevin Bishop Show	Nominated
2009	British Comedy Awards	Best Sketch Show	The Kevin Bishop Show	Nominated

== DVD releases ==
A DVD containing the pilot and all six episodes of the first series was released on 7 September 2009. Series two was released on DVD on 18 July 2010.
