= Oliver Maltman =

English actor

- Born: 19 January 1976 (age 50); South London, England
- Occupation: Actor
- Years active: 1978–present

Oliver Maltman (born 19 January 1976) is an English actor notable for his appearances in the TV series Star Stories, The Kevin Bishop Show, No Heroics and Clone. He has also appeared in Mike Leigh's films Happy-Go-Lucky in 2008, Another Year in 2010, the 2016 BBC Two comedy pilot We the Jury as Lucas, and the 2017 film The Mercy.

Maltman trained at the Central School of Speech and Drama.

== Filmography ==
=== Film ===
Year	Title	Role	Notes
2005	Dominion: Prequel to the Exorcist	Soldier #3	
2006	Loony in the Woods	Buttons (as Oli Maltman)	
2008	Happy-Go-Lucky	Jamie	
2009	Scouting for Rudeboys	Roland Mann	Short film
2010	Another Year	Joe	
2012	Will You Marry Me?	Taylor	Short film
2012	No Comment		Short film
2014	Chandide	Mark	Short film
2014	Mr. Turner	Theatre Actors	
2014	Maleficent	Advisor to King Henry	
2014	The Riot Club	Car Salesman	Uncredited
2014	A Wonderful Christmas Time	Simon	
2016	Circles	Andy	Short film
2016	Mother	Carer	Short film
2016	Brakes	Raymond	
2016	David Brent: Life on the Road	Ents Manager	Uncredited
2017	The Sense of an Ending	Shop Customer	
2017	Beast	Harrison	
2017	The Mercy	Dennis Herbstein	
2018	Holmes & Watson	Telegraph Operator	
2023	Operation Fortune: Ruse de Guerre	Arnold	
2026	Heartstopper Forever	Kenneth	Television film

=== Television ===
Year	Title	Role	Notes
1995	The Bill	Colin Stiles	1 episode
2002	The Estate Agents	Waiter	1 episode
2002	The Quest	Desmond	
2002	The Inspector Lynley Mysteries	Uniformed Officer	1 episode
2006–2007	Star Stories	David Beckham / Terry 'Kojak' Savalas / Sir Anthony Hopkins / Sean Pertwee / George Harrison / Bob Geldof	7 episodes
2007	Comedy Showcase	Various	1 episode
2008	No Heroics	Doomball	2 episodes
2008	Clone	Ian	6 episodes
2008–2009	The Kevin Bishop Show	Various Characters	7 episodes
2011	How Not to Live Your Life	Derek Yeaman	1 episode
2012	World Without End	Bishop Richard	3 episodes
2012	Full English		2 episodes
2012	Little Crackers	Dad	1 episode
2013	Death Comes to Pemberley	George Pratt	3 episodes
2014	Lives of the Infamous Comedy Blaps	Adam Wanger	
2014–2015	Crackanory	Gangster / Dan	2 episodes
2015	Critical	Dr. Dominic Busby	1 episode
2016	Crashing	Quentin the Property Manager	1 episode
2016	Benidorm	Peter Andre Tribute Act	1 episode
2016	Cuckoo	Stephan, University Supervisor	1 episode
2016	We the Jury	Lucas	1 episode
2016	Morgana Robinson's The Agency	Glen	1 episode
2017–2021	Back	Mike	12 episodes
2017	Red Dwarf	Chippy / Other Dispensing Machines	2 episodes
2017–2020	Liar	Nick Piller	6 episodes
2017–2018	Knightfall	Earl of Oxford / English Ambassador	4 episodes
2017	The Crown	Jim Orr	2 episodes
2018	The Guardians		TV movie
2019	Brexit: The Uncivil War	Michael Gove	TV movie
2020	Mister Winner	Steve	3 episodes
2020	The Alienist: Angel of Darkness	Sterling Hessler	1 episode
