= Pieces of Eight (1959 revue) =

Abubakarr Cheernor Kargbo

Original programme, Apollo Theatre, 1959

Pieces of Eight was a British musical comedy revue with sketches written by Peter Cook, music by Laurie Johnson and starring Kenneth Williams and Fenella Fielding.

The revue premiered at the Apollo Theatre, 23 September 1959 directed by Paddy Stone. Sets and costumes were designed by Tony Walton, lighting by Richard Pilbrow. Additional music was supplied by Sandy Wilson. The show also featured sketches written by Harold Pinter (unconnected to Pinter's later one-act play for a compendium of 8 plays by 8 playwrights also called Pieces of Eight which played in the US in 1982-1983), John Law and Lance Mulcahy. The full cast included Myra de Groot, Peter Reeves, Josephine Blake, Terence Theobald, Valerie Walsh, Peter Brett and the Frank Horrox Quintet.

A sequel One Over The Eight appeared in 1961.
