= Brakes (film) =

British comedy film

- Directed by: Mercedes Grower
- Written by: Mercedes Grower
- Produced by: Mercedes Grower
- Starring: Julian Barratt; Julia Davis; Noel Fielding; Kerry Fox; Roland Gift; Paul McGann; Steve Oram; Seb Cardinal; Kelly Campbell; Juliet Cowan; Mercedes Grower; Salena Godden; Kate Hardie; Siobhan Hewlett; Martin Hancock; Oliver Maltman; John Milroy; Daniel Roch; Morgan Thomas; Peter Wight
- Cinematography: Denzil Armour-Brown; Gabi Norland; Shiraz Ksaiba
- Edited by: Yasmine Almosawi; Lizzy Dyson; Andy Hague; Bridgette Williams; Greg Butler; Mike Hopkinson; Tania Reddin
- Release date: 2016
- Running time: 84 minutes
- Country: United Kingdom
- Language: English

Brakes is a 2016 British improvised comedy film. It was the directorial debut of actress Mercedes Grower.

== Plot ==
The film explores the experience of falling in and out of love through the lives of nine couples in London.

The first half of the film involves the parting of two couples. First, Elliot (Julian Barratt) and actor Ray (Oliver Maltman). After a drunken one-night stand in Barcelona, delusional Elliot tracks down regretful Ray at the National Theatre in London. Second, actress Livy (Julia Davis) and director Alan (Peter Wight) break when Livy is caught in a lie.

Layla (Mercedes Grower) is pregnant by Daniel (Noel Fielding). Daniel, who is dependent on narcotics, works in a Soho sex shop and takes a football with him everywhere.

== Cast ==
- Julian Barratt as Elliot
- Oliver Maltman as Ray
- Julia Davis as Livy
- Peter Wight as Alan
- Kerry Fox as Brinie
- Roland Gift as Rhys
- Steve Oram as John
- Kelly Campbell as Maeve
- Siobhan Hewlett as Kate
- John Milroy as Johnny
- Mercedes Grower as Layla
- Noel Fielding as Daniel
- Seb Cardinal as Karl
- Paul McGann
- Kate Hardie

== Production ==
The film was shot on a very small budget. It was shot using a hand-held camera.

The film was shot over a period of four years.

=== Location ===
The scene where Kate and Johnny meet is filmed at the Southampton Arms in North West London.

=== Music ===
The score includes compositions from artists including Quickspace, Sybil, and the Buzzcocks' "What Do I Get?" (1978).

== Release ==
The film was premiered at the Edinburgh Film Festival in 2016.

== Reception ==
Screen International described the film as involving "scattershot – sometimes dramatic, mostly comedic – content, which doesn’t add up to anything terribly profound about the nature of modern love."

Chortle described it as an "unsparing, bleakly funny film".
