= The Four Musketeers (musical) =

The Four Musketeers! is a musical with a score by Laurie Johnson and lyrics by Herbert Kretzmer. It was developed from a book by Michael Pertwee loosely based on The Three Musketeers.

The musical premiered at the Theatre Royal, Drury Lane, London on 5 December 1967. It was directed by Peter Coe. The sets were designed by Sean Kenny.

Harry Secombe played D'Artagnan, with Aubrey Woods as Richelieu. Also in the original London cast were: Elizabeth Larner, Glyn Owen, John Junkin, Stephanie Voss, Jeremy Lloyd, Sheena Marshe and Kenneth Connor.

The show ran for 462 performances.
