= Onyekachi Wambu =

Nigerian-British journalist and writer (born 1960)

- Born: 1960 (age 65–66); Nigeria
- Education: Stationers' Company's School; Essex University; Selwyn College, Cambridge
- Occupations: Journalist and writer
- Employer: African Foundation for Development (AFFORD)

Onyekachi WambuLiaten (born 1960) is a Nigerian–British journalist and writer. He has directed television documentaries for the BBC, Channel 4 and PBS.

== Life ==
Onyekachi Wambu was born in Nigeria in 1960. In 1970, after the Nigerian Civil War, he and his family moved to the UK. He attended the Stationers' Company's School in Hornsey, north London, then studied at the University of Essex, graduating with a degree in Government and Politics, after which he earned a postgraduate degree in International Relations from Selwyn College, Cambridge.

In 1983, he became a journalist, and in the late 1980s, was editor of The Voice newspaper, launching the "Innvervision" column. He is also a regular contributor to New African magazine. He worked as a senior producer and director at BBC Television, where his many credits included Ebony, Ebony People, Ain't No Black in the Union Jack and Will to Win. In the late 1990s, he worked in the US for two years making the PBS documentary Hopes on the Horizon (2001).

In 1998, he compiled the volume Empire Windrush: Fifty Years of Writing About Black Britain, commemorating the 50th anniversary of the arrival at Tilbury Docks of the Empire Windrush, bringing some 472 passengers from Jamaica.

In 2002, Wambu became information officer at the African Foundation for Development (AFFORD), where he is currently Executive Director. Established in 1994, AFFORD is an international organisation that describes its mission as being "to expand and enhance the contributions Africans in the diaspora make to African development", achieving this through a variety of projects, programmes and partnerships.

Wambu is the editor of the anthology Empire Windrush: Reflections on 75 Years & More of the Black British Experience, published in June 2023. Featuring a preface by Margaret Busby and new writing from Bernardine Evaristo, Mike Phillips and others, the collection "conjures a unique journey through the British past, present and future, via the prism of the Black imagination."

== Works ==
=== Books ===
- (ed.) Empire Windrush: Fifty Years of Writing About Black Britain (Preface by E. R. Braithwaite. London: Victor Gollancz, 1998. Published in the United States by Continuum under the title Hurricane hits England: An Anthology of Writing about Black Britain.
- A Fuller Picture. London: BFI, 1999.
- (with Nicholas Awde) Igbo-English, English-Igbo Dictionary and Phrasebook. New York: Hippocrene Books, 1999.
- Lord John Taylor of Warwick. London: Tamarind Books, 2000.
- (ed.) Under the Tree of Talking: Leadership for Change in Africa. London: Counterpoint, 2007.
- (ed.) Empire Windrush: Reflections on 75 Years & More of the Black British Experience (Preface by Margaret Busby). London: Weidenfeld & Nicolson, 2023, ISBN 9781399601917.

=== Selected articles ===
- "Black British Literature since Windrush", History, BBC, 3 March 2011.
- "The Undiscovered Country" (review), Writers Mosaic, 2020.
- "The many faces of Olaudah Equiano", Writers Mosaic, 25 January 2023.
- "Is Africa heading for a new era of proxy wars on its soil?", New African Magazine, 8 March 2023.

=== Documentaries ===
- Hopes on the Horizon, 2001. PBS.
