= Why Bother? (radio show) =

- Running time: 10 minutes
- Country of origin: United Kingdom
- Language(s): English
- Home station: BBC Radio 3
- Hosted by: Chris Morris
- Starring: Peter Cook
- Produced by: Chris Morris; Talkback Productions
- Original release: 10 January – 14 January 1994
- No. of series: 1
- No. of episodes: 5

Why Bother? is a comedy radio series made for BBC Radio 3, consisting of five 10-minute-long spoof interviews between Chris Morris and Peter Cook's character Sir Arthur Streeb-Greebling. Recorded in late 1993, the show was originally broadcast from 10–14 January 1994. Cook received the sole writing credit whilst Morris also produced the series, although the pair ad-libbed the majority of the dialogue, which Morris then edited.

Morris played a variation on the abrasive interviewer character he had created in On the Hour and later used in The Day Today. The short pieces provide further insights into the Streeb-Greebling character that Cook had created for Not Only... But Also in 1965.

== Subjects ==
Topics of conversation include Streeb-Greebling's experiments on eels, his role in the racial violence during the 1992 Los Angeles riots following the Rodney King trial, his military career, including his time in a Japanese prisoner-of-war camp during World War II, and his habit of strangling his business partners. The listener learns that Streeb-Greebling was put in prison by his father at the age of four, once spent a 'year and a quarter' standing on Lake Ontario with only bears for company, and hears of his next project: cloning from the fossilised remains of the infant Christ with the assistance of BMW, Honda and Sony.

== Interview style ==
When questioned on how structured the interviews were, Morris replied that the pair had agreed to "just shoot from the hip" and that "the preparation that existed, existed only in terms of the things we had already done", with each of the characters being familiar roles. Morris described the recording:

It was a very different style of improvisation from what I'd been used to, because those On the Hour and The Day Today things were about trying to establish a character within a situation, and Peter Cook was really doing 'knight's move' and 'double knight's move' thinking to construct jokes or ridiculous scenes flipping back on themselves, and then proceeded to skip about mentally with the agility of a grasshopper. Really quite extraordinary.

== Reception ==
Reviewing the CD release in 1999, The Guardian wrote "this flimsy collection of five short interviews [...] leaves you wondering why you did bother".

On an episode of With Great Pleasure, John Finnemore cited Why Bother? as one of his favorite pieces of comedy, citing a moment in the track "Bears" in which Cook attempts to move on from a subject and Morris prompts him to improvise further.

== CD release ==
Why Bother?

Studio album by Chris Morris and Peter Cook
- Released: 1 March 1999
- Recorded: 1993
- Genre: Comedy
- Length: 49:41
- Label: BBC Radio Collection
- Producer: Chris Morris

The complete series was released on CD and cassette through BBC Radio Collection in 1999, with the show intros and credits removed to create a tight 50-minute comedy album presumably designed to evoke the Derek and Clive records.

== Episode/track listing ==
1. "Eels, Love and Guns"
2. "Bears"
3. "Christ"
4. "Prisoner of War"
5. "Drugs etc"
