= Sir Arthur Streeb-Greebling =

British television character

Sir Arthur Streeb-Greebling is a fictional character played by British comedian Peter Cook throughout his career. Streeb-Greebling (or Greeb-Streebling, depending on Cook's mood) is a stereotype of the upper class English duffer, described as "narrow-minded" and occasionally a "heartless bastard". John Cleese described him as one of Cook's range of "men, particularly English men, so trapped by their culture that they never knew how to live".

He was usually presented in the form of interviews with various comedians or journalists acting as the interviewer, including Chris Morris and Ludovic Kennedy. The most frequent (and famous) interviewer was Cook's comedy partner, Dudley Moore, in Beyond the Fringe and Not Only... But Also.

== Biography ==
Sir Arthur is the son of Lady Beryl Streeb-Greebling—a "wonderful dancer" who was still dancing at 107 years of age, and who "was capable of breaking a swan's wing with a blow of her nose"—who inspired him to take up his life's work of teaching ravens to fly underwater. Sir Arthur claims "She came up to me in the conservatory—I was pruning some walnuts—and she said 'Arthur'—I wasn't Sir Arthur in those days—'if you don't get underwater and start teaching ravens to fly, I'll smash your stupid face off,' and I think it was this that sort of first started my interest in the whole business." However, his work is largely inconsequential. When Moore's interviewer asks "Is it difficult to get ravens to fly underwater?" his honest response is "Well, I think the word difficult is an awfully good one here. Yes, it is. It's nigh impossible ... There they are sitting on my wrist. I say 'Fly! Fly you little devils!!' ... [then] they drown. Little black feathery figure topples off my wrist and spirals to a watery grave. We're knee deep in feathers off that part of the coast ... not a single success in the whole forty years of training." When a perplexed Moore asks if this makes his life a miserable failure, Sir Arthur is forced to reply, "My life has been a miserable failure, yes."

Sir Arthur's thirty-five years as a restaurateur were nothing short of disastrous. His restaurant The Frog and Peach was a catastrophic failure, owing to its location in the middle of a bog in the heart of the Yorkshire Moors, and its very limited menu—the "nauseating" Frog à la Pêche and the "positively revolting" Pêche à la Frog.

It was Sir Arthur's father who inspired his life's other work: the study of worms. Sir Arthur's father claimed to have found the world's longest worm, at approximately three thousand miles. He came across the head in the Andes and spent five years tracing it back to the Azores. However, accusations were made that he had actually discovered the head of one worm in the Andes and the tail of another worm in the Azores. As a result, Streeb-Greebling spent a great deal of his life trying to encourage worms to speak to him, again to no avail.

== Later interviews ==
Towards the end of his life, Cook appeared as Streeb-Greebling, interviewed by Ludovic Kennedy in "A Life In Pieces". The series of twelve five-minute interviews saw Sir Arthur recounting snippets of his life loosely based on "The Twelve Days of Christmas". Another set of more famous and successful interviews involving Cook as Streeb-Greebling with Chris Morris as the interviewer (basing his performance on his abrasive newsreader character from On the Hour and The Day Today) were broadcast on Why Bother? on BBC Radio 3 in 1994, less than a year before Cook's death.

== Reaction ==
William Cook described the character as "one of Peter's greatest comic creations", and felt it was a character that Peter Cook was "born to play", seeing Streeb-Greebling as the closest to his own background. Harry Thompson agrees that the character was clearly autobiographical. Ben Thompson called the interviews with Morris "some of the finest work either man has ever produced".
