= Colin Hoult =

English actor and writer (born 1979)

- Born: 15 May 1979 (age 47); Beeston, Nottinghamshire, England
- Occupations: Actor; writer

Colin Hoult (born 15 May 1979) is an English actor and writer in television, radio, and theatre. He studied at the Manchester School of Theatre.

== Career ==
Hoult has worked in various television productions, including Russell Howard's Good News (BBC Three, 2009), Al Murray's Multiple Personality Disorder (ITV1, 2009), Angelo's (Five, 2007), Edinburgh and Beyond (Paramount Comedy Channel, 2007), Comedy Shuffle (BBC Three, 2007), The Charlotte Church Show (Channel 4, 2006), and Harry Hill's TV Burp (ITV1).

In 2013, Hoult had a recurring role in series 5 of Being Human. In the same year, he appeared as a life coach in the BBC's Life's Too Short, starring Warwick Davis, a show written by Ricky Gervais and Stephen Merchant. Hoult is also known for his collaborations with Gervais, appearing on Derek as Geoff in 2014 and as Ken Otley in After Life (2020). In 2019, Hoult began appearing in the CBBC series Almost Never, in the recurring role of AJ.

Hoult's radio work includes House on Fire (BBC Radio 4, 2010), Out to Lunch (BBC Radio 2, 2008), Rudy's Rare Records (BBC Radio 4), Agatha Christie's Crooked House (BBC Radio 4), Colin and Fergus's Digi Radio (BBC Radio 7), Buy Me Up (BBC Radio 2), Regressed (BBC Radio 4), 28 Acts in 28 Minutes (BBC Radio 4), The Milk Run (BBC Radio 1), Nick Mohammed in Bits, and Colin Hoult's Carnival of Monsters (BBC Radio 4, 2013).

His theatre credits include Pete and Dud: Come Again (Edinburgh Festival Fringe in 2005, London's West End, followed by a tour of New Zealand), and Zimbani (Edinburgh Festival Fringe 2008), with David James McNeil and Claire Warde.

Hoult is a regular performer on the London comedy circuit with actor/stand-up comic Fergus Craig in the double act Colin and Fergus. They performed three shows at the Edinburgh Festival Fringe between 2004 and 2006: Colin & Fergus, Colin & Fergus 2, and Rutherford Lodge. In 2004, they won the Writers Guild Award for Comedy at the festival.

Hoult performed his own show, Carnival of Monsters, at the 2009 Edinburgh Festival. It was directed by Stephen Evans and also featured Evans, Zoe Gardner, and Dan Snelgrove.

Hoult returned to the Edinburgh Fringe Festival in 2010 for his second solo show, Enemy of the World, using the same actors and production team as the previous year. At the 2011 Edinburgh Festival, he performed his third solo outing, Inferno. This show featured Gardner and Snelgrove and was directed by Kat Hoult.

In 2015, Hoult appeared as various characters in ITV2's sketch/prank show Glitchy. He returned to the Edinburgh Fringe as his character Anna Mann in 2016 and 2017. Both shows were critically acclaimed and listed among the best-reviewed comedy shows at the Fringe by British Comedy Guide.

In April 2026, it was announced that Hoult would play George Mole in the upcoming television adaptation of The Secret Diary of Adrian Mole, Aged 13¾.
