= Pete and Dud: Come Again =

Pete and Dud: Come Again is a stage play about British Beyond the Fringe comedians Peter Cook and Dudley Moore, which was written by Chris Bartlett and Nick Awde. The comedy-drama had a sold-out run at the Assembly Rooms as part of the 2005 Edinburgh Festival Fringe, where it was shortlisted for a Fringe First Award by The Scotsman, before moving to London's West End at The Venue (now Leicester Square Theatre) in March 2006; this version starred Kevin Bishop as Moore, Tom Goodman-Hill as Cook, Colin Hoult as Jonathan Miller, and Fergus Craig as Alan Bennett. It was published in playtext form by Methuen.

Pete and Dud: Come Again examines the highly-influential comic relationship which existed between Cook and Moore. Set on a chat show during the early 1980s, it tells their tale from the perspective of Dudley Moore and celebrates the contribution he made to their comedy. In June 2006, it had a short run in Auckland, New Zealand, as part of the Bruce Mason Centre's "Best of British" festival and toured the UK in spring 2007 (beginning at the Yvonne Arnaud Theatre in Guildford).

== See also ==
- Not Only But Always
