= Kevin Bishop =

English actor, comedian, and writer

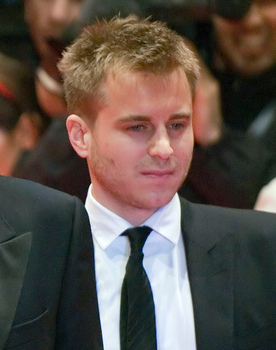
- Bishop at the premiere of Irina Palm in 2007
- Born: Kevin Brian Bishop; 1980 (age 45–46)
- Occupations: Actor; comedian; writer
- Years active: 1994–present
- Spouse: Casta Bishop (m. 2006; div. 2024)
- Children: 2

Comedy career
- Genres: Theatre, film, TV
- Subjects: Celebrities; media

Kevin Brian Bishop (born 1980) is a British actor, comedian and writer. He is best known for his roles as Jim Hawkins in Muppet Treasure Island, Stupid Brian in My Family, and Nigel Norman Fletcher in the 2016 revival of Porridge, and as star of The Kevin Bishop Show, which he co-wrote with Lee Hupfield.

== Career ==
Bishop's first role was in Grange Hill. His second role, at age 16, was as Ben Quayle in Silent Witness. He played Stupid Brian in three episodes of My Family. He starred in Muppet Treasure Island as Jim Hawkins.

In 2002, Bishop had a supporting role alongside Kelly Reilly and Romain Duris as William, the brother of an English Erasmus student, in the French comedy L'Auberge espagnole (The Spanish Apartment). Following its box office success, he appeared in the 2005 sequel, Les Poupées russes (Russian Dolls). In 2005, he portrayed the late comedian Dudley Moore onstage in Pete and Dud: Come Again, a drama charting Moore's turbulent relationship with Peter Cook, which debuted at the Assembly Rooms as part of the Edinburgh Fringe before transferring to The Venue in London's West End in March 2006. In August 2007 he appeared as the title character in Channel 4's satirical spoof documentary "Being Tom Cruise", a spin-off of Star Stories. In September 2014, Bishop appeared in the one-man show Fully Committed at the Menier Chocolate Factory, in which he played forty characters.

In 2013, Bishop appeared in the American comedy series Super Fun Night, written by and starring Australian comedic actress Rebel Wilson. The show ran for one season.

In August 2016, Bishop starred in the revival of classic 1970s BBC sitcom Porridge. He played the role of Fletch, grandson of Ronnie Barker's original main character, locked up for cyber-crime. Originally a one-off, the show was commissioned to full series in October 2016. The first series was broadcast in October 2017 on a 6-week run on BBC One as well as the full series being released at the same time on BBC iPlayer.

In 2016, Bishop played Nigel Farage in a one-off BBC Two comedy series entitled Nigel Farage Gets His Life Back.

In 2017, Bishop became the speaking voice for 2-D, fictional lead singer of British virtual band Gorillaz.

== Selected filmography ==
Year	Film	Role	Notes
1996	Muppet Treasure Island	Jim Hawkins	Also played the role of a boy soprano in musical numbers
1997	Silent Witness	Ben Quayle	Series 2, "Friends Like These"
1997	Pie in the Sky, Series 5, "The Apprentice"	Nicky Banks	
2000	The Big Finish	Kevin	
2001	My Family (TV)	"Stupid" Brian	
2002	L'Auberge espagnole	William	
2002	Food of Love	Paul Porterfield	
2005	Peep Show (TV)	Ollie	
2005	Russian Dolls	William	
2006–2008	Star Stories	Various	
2007	Irina Palm	Tom	
2008–2009	The Kevin Bishop Show (TV)	Himself	
2011	A Few Best Men	Graham	
2012	May I Kill U?	Baz	
2012	Keith Lemon: The Film	Dougie	
2013–2014	Super Fun Night (TV)	Richard Royce	
2015	We’re Doomed! The Dads Army Story	James Beck	(TV film)
2016	Benidorm	Peter Andre tribute act	Series 8 Episode 7
2016	The Rack Pack	Barry Hearn	
2016	Nigel Farage Gets His Life Back	Nigel Farage	
2016–2017	Porridge	Nigel Norman Fletcher	August 2016 one-off special episode: 2017 Series 1, 6 episodes
2017	Tracey Ullman's Show	Various	Series 2, 6 episodes
2017	Detectorists	Kelvin	Series 3, episode 3
2020	Song Machine	2-D	(Web series)
2021	Inside No. 9	Arlo	Episode: "Wuthering Heist"
2022	Strike	Wally Cardew	Series 6, 4 episodes

== Awards and nominations ==
Year	Award	Category	Nominated work	Result
1997	Saturn Awards	Best Performance by a Younger Actor	Muppet Treasure Island	Nominated
1997	Young Artist Awards	Best Performance in a Feature Film: Leading Young Actor	Muppet Treasure Island	Nominated
2006	British Comedy Awards	Best Male Comedy Newcomer	Star Stories	Nominated
2007	British Comedy Awards	Best TV Comedy Actor	Star Stories	Nominated
2008	British Academy Television Awards	Best Comedy Programme (shared with Lee Hupfield, Elliot Hegarty, and Philip Clarke)	Star Stories	Nominated
2009	British Comedy Awards	Best Sketch Show	The Kevin Bishop Show	Nominated
2010	British Academy Television Awards	Best Comedy Programme (shared with Lee Hupfield, Dominic Brigstocke, and Samantha Martin)	The Kevin Bishop Show	Nominated
