= Nick Awde =

British writer, artist, singer-songwriter & critic (b.1961)

Nick Awde Hill (born 29 December 1961) is a British writer, artist, singer-songwriter and critic. He lives in London and Brussels.

== Personal life ==
The son of the international lawyer who formulated laws integral to global shipping of containers, he was raised in Nigeria, Sudan and Kenya before being sent to the Jesuit Catholic boarding school Stonyhurst College in the UK. His parents divorced when he was a teenager. After the divorce, his father moved to Northern Ireland and his mother moved to Germany. Despite the above, most of Awde's teenage home life was spent in Soho and the West End of London. He studied Arabic and the Hausa language at London's School of Oriental and African Studies. After graduation, he worked for several years on building sites and English instruction in Spain. Afterward, he became a journalist.

== Plays and fiction ==
With Chris Bartlett he co-wrote the comedy drama Pete and Dud: Come Again, a hit at the Assembly Rooms at the Edinburgh Festival in August 2005 before transferring to London's West End at The Venue, in March 2006, then doing a 90-date tour of the UK the following year. The play examines the comic relationship that existed between comedians Peter Cook and Dudley Moore of Beyond the Fringe; set in a chat show during the early eighties, the play tells their tale from the perspective of Dudley Moore, by then an international film star.

In 2007 two other plays followed, premiering at the Edinburgh Festival. Written with Chris Bartlett, directed by David Giles and starring Jessica Martin and Jason Wood, Unnatural Acts is a comedy about two flatmates, a gay man and a straight woman, who try to have a baby together. Written by Awde and directed by Jon Bonfiglio, Blood Confession is a violent drama about an interrogation, about a child murder from 25 years ago, that goes horribly wrong.

In 1993, Awde wrote, composed and produced Andrew Lloyd Webber The Musical, described as "a bizarre mix of spoof and satire" by The Virgin Encyclopedia of Stage & Film Musicals. A pastiche of the life of top musical composer Lloyd Webber, in loving homage to Mel Brooks' The Producers, it ran in a variety of fringe venues across London with several casts. Awde's 1994 follow-up Margaret Thatcher: The Musical failed to find backing. Awde's other stage works are Eros and the Skull (Bloomsbury Theatre, London, 1988) – a multi-created one-man show about the French poet Baudelaire – and Semtex & Lipstick (King's Head Theatre, London, 1992) – a drama for actor and actress about love and political torture. He also co-designed costumes for historical drama Tewodros (Arts Theatre, 1987).

In 2003 he published his first novel, The Virgin Killers, as part of The Public School Chronicles series. It is a thriller about murders of priests at a Catholic prep school in the wilds of Lancashire that lead to a trail of Jesuit and Freemason conspiracies deep within the British Establishment.

He has been a theatre critic since the early 1990s, and has been writing for The Stage newspaper for most of that time. Together with Gerald Berkowitz, in 1999 he set up theatreguidelondon.co.uk. He worked on The Voice during a key period of the fight for black empowerment in the UK, frequently with immediate impact, as when he wrote a front-page headline that contributed to a riot in Brixton the following day and attempted siege of the local police station.

As an illustrator and cartoonist, over the years he has worked for newspapers such as The Voice and The Weekly Journal – where he was the regular profile illustrator for several years – City Limits and The Guardian newspaper. His cartoons also illustrate comedian Llewella Gideon's The Little Big Woman Book. He has done illustration work for Spanish educational publishers and has run a wide range of cartoon strips in specialist publications such as Boogie (music press, Spain), London Student, Untitled, The Wharf and The Stage.

== Music ==
=== Desert Hearts ===
Hill's rock group Desert Hearts initially operated as a rock three-piece that also played under the name of Dr Wu in 1990 before becoming a more complex four-piece in 1991 with Awde on vocals, guitar and violin, Andy Matthews on bass and vocals, Leo Katana on guitars, plus a string of drummers. Dropping the Dr Wu tag, Awde went into the studio in 1993 to produce sessions with Andy Ward – Awde provided vocals and played all other instruments – guitars, bass, keyboards and violin. Sub-titled 'Love Songs from the Underground', 1996's I Saw Satan on the Northern Line was released as a 'CD without music'. Designed in the format of a CD lyrics booklet, it contains often comic observations on modern life. The band came out of hibernation in 2010 with the release of Close to the Edge B/W Rocket Man/Meryl Streep, a mini album laced with Mellotron keyboard arrangements.

=== MelloFest ===
November 2008 saw the first MelloFest take place at the Fiddler's Elbow in Kentish Town, London. Organised by Awde, MelloFest One featured two Mellotrons onstage along with discussions and live Mellotron-inspired music from guests, plus the official launch of Awde's book Mellotron. Talking about their music and in some cases also playing it were: David Cross (King Crimson), Nick Magnus (Steve Hackett Band), Martin Orford (IQ), Jakko Jakszyk (21st Century Schizoid Band/Tangent/Level 42), Dave Cousins (Strawbs) & Robert Kirby (Strawbs/Nick Drake/Paul Weller), Robert Webb (England) and Tony Clarke, producer of the Moody Blues.

A more concert-based second MelloFest Two, complete with three Mellotrons onstage and a Stylophone, took place at The Luminaire in London on 2 May 2009 featuring Clarke, Orford, Webb, Maggie Alexander, Mark Rae, Andy Thompson and a virtual appearance from Jordan Rudess of Dream Theater demonstrating the new Ellatron iPod/iPhone Mellotron app.

MelloFest Three is the Nick Awde & Desert Hearts EP Close to the Edge, released in early 2010. MelloFest Four will be the band's follow-up album MelloRetro. MelloFest Six is 2011's A Christmas Carol Unplugged at the Union Chapel, north London, a music biz update of Charles Dickens' classic A Christmas Carol arranged by Awde, written by Chris Bartlett and starring Noddy Holder of Slade. Musicians appearing in the show at the Union Chapel, north London, are Robert Webb, Simon Scardanelli, Andy Thompson, Knox of The Vibrators, Marc Atkinson, Grace Solero and member of parliament and deputy transport minister Norman Baker. The stage director is Saul Reichlin.

== Academic work ==
As Nicholas Awde, Hill has written or edited books on non-European languages and cultures, including a Chechen Phrasebook, a Georgian Phrasebook, Women in Islam: An Anthology from the Qur'an and Hadiths, An Illustrated History of Islam and an Arabic Dictionary. He has written three other dictionaries for Swahili, Serbo-Croatian and Hausa, as well as 15-plus dictionary-phrasebooks. He has commissioned many authors, particularly from the Caucasus, editing and designing their books for other publishers. He is also a long-standing consultant on the Caucasus, and, with Fred James Hill, runs the publishing companies Bennett & Bloom (academic) and Desert Hearts (general arts).

== Dramatic works ==
- Migraaaants!, translation from French of Matei Visniec's play (2016)
- Jason (...and the Fleeced) (2016)
- Khojaly: The Play (2016)
- The Europeans (Antwerp) (2015)
- Translator's Introduction (in Italian) in La Bella Tarantola nel grano e altre storie di Puglia (2015)
- Hecuba, translation from French of Matei Visniec's play (2015)
- The Europeans (Bruges) (2014)
- Jamie and the Mountain Monsters, featuring Matt Panesh aka Monkey Poet (2014)
- Translations from Romanian of Occidental Express, Spider and Decomposed Theatre, in Matei Visniec: How to Explain the History of Communism to Mental Patients and Other Plays (2014)
- HEADS UP! (The Prisoner of Terminal 4, or: Hague’s Miranda Samba) – A Flash Mob Satire (2013)
- Jimmy Savile: The Punch and Judy Show (2013)
- Noddy Holder's A Christmas Carol Unplugged (producer, director & musical arranger, 2011)
- Blood Confession (2007)
- Unnatural Acts (2007), with Chris Bartlett
- Pete and Dud: Come Again (2005), with Chris Bartlett
- Andrew Lloyd Webber: The Musical (1994)
- Semtex & Lipstick (1993)
- Eros & the Skull (1988), with Peter Stevenson & John FitZgeRald
- Design: Tewodros (1987)

== Discography ==
- Belgium-737 – An Opera of Sorts (as Nick Awde, album, 2026 [2016])
- The Northern Line Tapes (as Nick Awde, album, 2026 [1982])
- Mellotronic Belgian Blues (as Nick Awde, album, 2015)
- Paradox of Choice, Mindgames – vocal session (2015)
- Always Tomorrow, The Reform Club with Norman Baker (2013) – sessions, Mellotron
- Comandamenti di Auriti, Heather Beaumont, Venice Biennale (2013) – voices
- Close to the Edge B/W Rocket Man/Meryl Streep (as Nick Awde & Desert Hearts, EP, 2010)

== Select bibliography ==
2010

- Georgia: A Short History, edited with Fred James Hill (forthcoming)
- One-Person Show (forthcoming)
- Singer-Songwriters Vol. 1 (forthcoming)
- Zazaki (Dimli) Phrasebook (forthcoming)
- Kurdish (Kurmanji) Phrasebook (forthcoming)
- The Armenians: People, Culture & History, edited with Fred James Hill (forthcoming)

2009

- The Azerbaijanis: People, Culture & History, edited with Fred James Hill
- Kurdish (Sorani) Phrasebook
- Tatar Phrasebook

2008

- Mellotron: The Machine and the Musicians that Revolutionised Rock

2007

- Modern Aramaic Dictionary & Phrasebook (Assyrian/Syriac: Swadaya and Turoyo), with Nineb Limassu and Nicholas Al-Jeloo

2006

- Pete and Dud: Come Again, with Chris Bartlett
- Western Armenian Dictionary & Phrasebook, with Vazken-Khatchig Davidian
- Farsi Dictionary & Phrasebook, with Camilla Shahribaf

2005

- Women in Islam: An Anthology from the Qur'an & Hadiths [first edition 1985]
- Turkmen Dictionary & Phrasebook, with William Dirks & Amandurdy Amadurdyev

2004

- Serbian Dictionary & Phrasebook, with Duska Radosavljevic

2003

- The Virgin Killers
- History of the Islamic World (Illustrated), with Fred James Hill
- Eastern Armenian Dictionary & Phrasebook, with Peter Maghdashyan
- Pashto Dictionary & Phrasebook, with Asmatullah Sarwan
- Dari Dictionary & Phrasebook
- Urdu Dictionary & Phrasebook

2002

- London: An Illustrated History, with Robert Chester
- Uzbek Dictionary & Phrasebook, with William Dirks & Umida Hikmatullaeva
- Swahili Dictionary & Phrasebook

2001

- Armenian First Names, with Emanuela Losi

2000

- Andrew Lloyd Webber: The Musical
- Swahili Dictionary

1999

- The Little Big Woman Book, by Llewella Gideon, illustrated by Nick Awde
- Somali Dictionary & Phrasebook
- Azerbaijani Dictionary & Phrasebook, with Famil Ismailov
- Igbo Dictionary & Phrasebook, with Onyekachi Wambu
- Treasury of Indian Love: Poems & Proverbs, with Christopher Shackle

1997

- Armenian Perspectives (edited)
- Treasury of African Love: Poems & Proverbs
- Georgian Dictionary & Phrasebook, with Thea Khitarishvili
- The Mandeer Ayurvedic Cookbook, by Ramesh Patel, illustrated by Nick Awde

1996

- I Saw Satan on the Northern Line: Love Songs from the Underground
- Chechen Dictionary and Phrasebook, with Muhammad Galaev
- Serbo-Croatian Dictionary
- Hausa Dictionary
- Qasida Poetry in Islamic Asia and Africa (Studies in Arabic literature): Vols. 1 & 2, edited by Stefan Sperl & Christopher Shackle, consultant editor Nicholas Awde

1992

- Playground: Vols. 1, 2 & 3, with Imad Alassir

1987

- 21st Century Hausa
- Hausa Reader
- The Arabic Alphabet. How to Read & Write It (1987), with Putros Samano

1985

- Women in Islam: An Anthology from the Qur'an & Hadiths [new edition 2005]
- Bibliography of Caucasian Linguistics

1982

- Pickled Priests, illustrated by Nick Awde
