= Peter Cook =

British comedian and actor (1937–1995)

- Cook on Kraft Music Hall, 1969
- Born: Peter Edward Cook; 17 November 1937; Torquay, Devon, England
- Died: 9 January 1995 (aged 57); Hampstead, London, England
- Resting place: St John-at-Hampstead Churchyard, Hampstead, London, England
- Education: Pembroke College, Cambridge
- Occupations: Comedian; actor; satirist; playwright; screenwriter
- Years active: 1958–1995
- Spouses: Wendy Snowden (m. 1963; div. 1971); Judy Huxtable (m. 1973; div. 1989); Chiew Lin Chong (m. 1989)
- Children: Two

Peter Edward Cook (17 November 1937 – 9 January 1995) was an English comedian, actor, satirist, playwright and screenwriter. He was the leading figure of the British satire boom of the 1960s, and he was associated with the anti-establishment comedic movement that emerged in the United Kingdom in the late 1950s.

Born in Torquay, he was educated at the University of Cambridge. There he became involved with the Footlights Club, of which he later became president. After graduating, 1960 saw him create the comedy stage revue Beyond the Fringe, alongside Alan Bennett, Jonathan Miller and Dudley Moore. In 1961, Cook opened the comedy club The Establishment in Soho. After leaving Beyond the Fringe, Cook and Moore began a television career with the sketch comedy show Not Only... But Also in 1965. Cook's deadpan monologues contrasted with Moore's buffoonery. They received the 1966 British Academy Television Award for Best Entertainment Performance.

Following the success of the show, the duo appeared together in the films The Wrong Box (1966) and Bedazzled (1967). The 1970s saw Cook and Moore work on a final series of Not Only... But Also, several stand-up tours, and the Derek and Clive series of comedy albums. After 1978, Cook no longer collaborated with Moore, apart from a few cameo appearances, but continued to be a regular performer in British television and film.

Referred to as "the father of modern satire" by The Guardian in 2005, Cook was ranked number one in the Comedians' Comedian, a poll of more than 300 comics, comedy writers, producers and directors in the English-speaking world.

== Early life ==
Cook was born at his parents' house, "Shearbridge", in Middle Warberry Road, Torquay, Devon. He was the only son, and eldest of the three children, of Alexander Edward "Alec" Cook (1906–1984), a colonial civil servant, and his wife Ethel Catherine Margaret (1908–1994), daughter of solicitor Charles Mayo. His father served as a political officer and later as a district officer in Nigeria, then as financial secretary to the colony of Gibraltar, followed by a return to Nigeria as Permanent Secretary of the Eastern Region, based at Enugu.

Cook's grandfather, Edward Arthur Cook (1869–1914), had also been a colonial civil servant, traffic manager for the Federated Malay States Railway in Kuala Lumpur, Malaya. The stress he suffered in the lead-up to an interview regarding promotion led him to commit suicide. His wife, Minnie Jane (1869–1957), daughter of Thomas Wreford, of Thelbridge and Witheridge, Devon, and of Stratford-upon-Avon, of a prominent Devonshire family traced back to 1440, kept this fact secret. Peter Cook only discovered the truth when later researching his family.

Cook was educated at Radley College and then went up to Pembroke College, Cambridge, where he read French and German. As a student, Cook initially intended to become a career diplomat like his father, but Britain "had run out of colonies", as he put it. Although largely apathetic politically, particularly in later life when he displayed a deep distrust of politicians of all hues, he joined the Cambridge University Liberal Club. At Pembroke, Cook performed and wrote comedy sketches as a member of the Cambridge Footlights Club, of which he became president in 1960. His hero was fellow Footlights writer and Cambridge magazine writer David Nobbs.

While still at university, Cook wrote for Kenneth Williams, providing several sketches for Williams' hit West End comedy revue Pieces of Eight and much of the follow-up, One Over the Eight.

== Career ==
=== 1960s ===
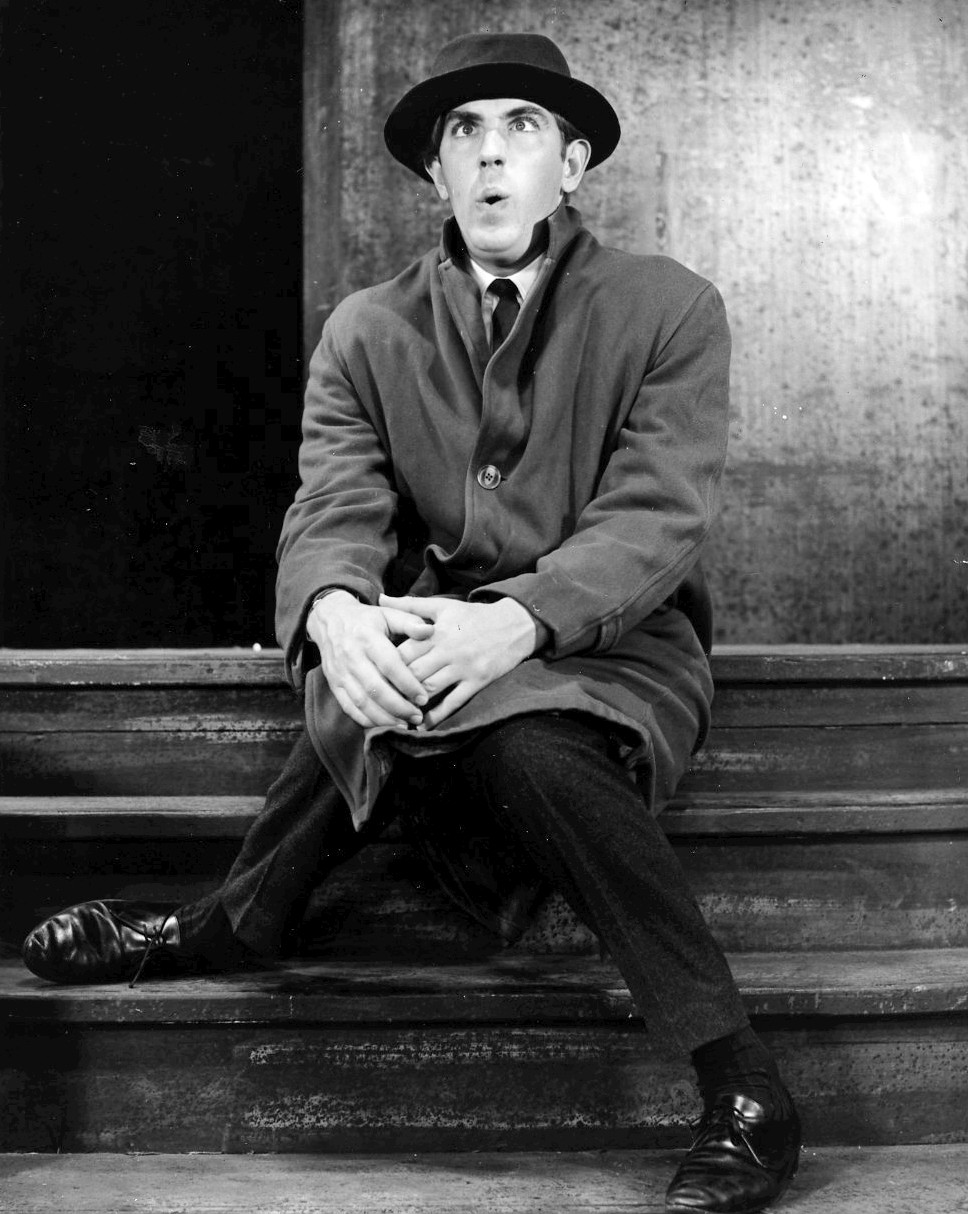
Cook playing the character of E. L. Wisty in the revue Beyond the Fringe, 1962

Cook first came to prominence in his own right in the satirical stage show Beyond the Fringe, alongside Jonathan Miller, Alan Bennett, and Dudley Moore. Beyond the Fringe became a great success in London after being first performed at the Edinburgh Festival in 1960, and included Cook impersonating the prime minister, Harold Macmillan. This was one of the first occasions satirical political mimicry had been attempted in live theatre, and it shocked audiences. During one performance, Macmillan was in the theatre and Cook departed from his script and attacked him verbally.

In 1961, Cook opened The Establishment, a club at 18 Greek Street in Soho in central London, presenting fellow comedians in a nightclub setting, including American Lenny Bruce. Cook later joked that it was a satirical venue modelled on "those wonderful Berlin cabarets ... which did so much to stop the rise of Hitler and prevent the outbreak of the Second World War". As a members-only venue, it was outside the censorship restrictions. The Establishment's regular cabaret performers were Eleanor Bron, John Bird, and John Fortune.

Cook befriended and supported Australian comedian and actor Barry Humphries, who began his British solo career at the club. Humphries said in his autobiography, My Life As Me, that he found Cook's lack of interest in art and literature off-putting. Dudley Moore's jazz trio played in the basement of the club during the early 1960s.

Cook also opened an Establishment club in New York in 1963, with Lenny Bruce being one of the comedians who performed there.

In 1962, the BBC commissioned a pilot for a television series of satirical sketches based on the Establishment Club, but it was not immediately picked up and Cook went to New York City for a year to perform Beyond the Fringe on Broadway. When he returned, the pilot had been refashioned as That Was the Week That Was and had made a television star of David Frost, something Cook made no secret of resenting. He complained that Frost's success was based on directly copying Cook's own stage persona and Cook dubbed him "the bubonic plagiarist", and said that his only regret in life, according to Alan Bennett, had been saving Frost from drowning. This incident occurred in the summer of 1963, when the rivalry between the two men was at its height. Cook had realised that Frost's potential drowning would have looked deliberate if he had not been rescued.

By the mid 1960s the satire boom was coming to an end and Cook said: "England was about to sink giggling into the sea." Around this time, Cook provided substantial financial backing for the satirical magazine Private Eye, supporting it through difficult periods, particularly in libel trials. Cook invested his own money and solicited investment from his friends. For a time, the magazine was produced from the premises of the Establishment Club. In 1963, Cook married Wendy Snowden. The couple had two daughters, Lucy and Daisy, but the marriage ended in 1970.

Cook's first regular television spot was on Granada Television's On the Braden Beat with Bernard Braden, where he featured his most enduring character: the static, dour and monotonal E. L. Wisty, whom Cook had conceived for Radley College's Marionette Society.

Cook and Dudley Moore in London for the US television programme Kraft Music Hall

Cook's comedy partnership with Dudley Moore led to Not Only... But Also. This was originally intended by the BBC as a vehicle for Moore's music, but Moore invited Cook to write sketches and appear with him. Using few props, they created dry, absurd television that proved hugely popular and lasted for three series between 1965 and 1970. Cook played characters such as Sir Arthur Streeb-Greebling and the two men created their Pete and Dud alter egos. Other sketches included "Superthunderstingcar", a parody of the Gerry Anderson marionette TV shows, and Cook's pastiche of 1960s trendy arts documentaries – satirised in a parodic segment on Greta Garbo.

When Cook learned a few years later that the videotapes of the series were to be wiped, a common practice at the time, he offered to buy the recordings from the BBC but was refused because of copyright issues. He suggested he could purchase new tapes so that the BBC would have no need to erase the originals, but this was also turned down. Of the original 22 programmes, only eight still survive complete. A compilation of six half-hour programmes, The Best of... What's Left of... Not Only...But Also was shown on television and has been released on both VHS and DVD.

With The Wrong Box (1966) and Bedazzled (1967), Cook and Moore began to act in films together. Directed by Stanley Donen, the underlying story of Bedazzled is credited to Cook and Moore and its screenplay to Cook. A comic parody of Faust, it stars Cook as George Spigott (the Devil) who tempts Stanley Moon (Moore), a frustrated short-order chef, with the promise of gaining his heart's desire – the unattainable beauty and waitress at his cafe, Margaret Spencer (Eleanor Bron) – in exchange for his soul, but repeatedly tricks him. The film features cameo appearances by Barry Humphries as Envy and Raquel Welch as Lust. Moore composed the soundtrack music and co-wrote (with Cook) the songs performed in the film. His jazz trio backed Cook on the theme, a parodic anti-love song, which Cook delivered in a deadpan monotone and included his familiar put-down, "you fill me with inertia".

In 1968, Cook and Moore briefly switched to ATV for four one-hour programmes titled Goodbye Again, based on the Pete and Dud characters. Cook's increasing alcoholism led him to become reliant on cue cards. The show was not a popular success, owing in part to a strike causing the suspension of the publication of the ITV listings magazine TV Times. John Cleese was also a cast member, who would become lifelong friends with Cook and later collaborated on projects together.

=== 1970s ===
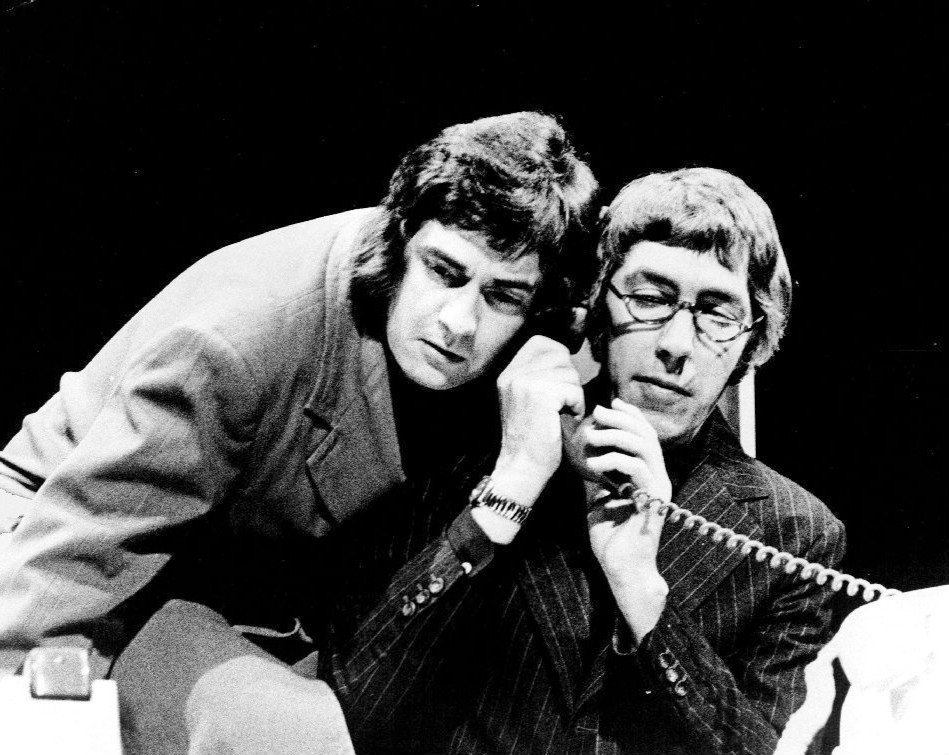
Cook (right) and Moore performing in the revue Good Evening on Broadway

In 1970, Cook took over a project initiated by David Frost for a satirical film about an opinion pollster who rises to become Prime Minister of Great Britain. Under Cook's guidance, the character became modelled on Frost. The film, The Rise and Rise of Michael Rimmer, was not a success, although the cast contained notable names (including Cleese and Graham Chapman, who were co-writers).

Cook became a favourite of the chat show circuit but his effort at hosting such a show for the BBC in 1971, Where Do I Sit?, was said by the critics to have been a disappointment. It was axed after only three episodes and was replaced by Michael Parkinson, the start of Parkinson's career as a chat show host. Parkinson later asked Cook what his ambitions were, Cook replied jocularly "[...] in fact, my ambition is to shut you up altogether you see!"

Cook and Moore fashioned sketches from Not Only....But Also and Goodbye Again with new material into the stage revue called Behind the Fridge. This show toured Australia in 1972, where a TV special was made of it by GTV-9, before transferring to New York City in 1973, retitled as Good Evening. Cook frequently appeared on and off stage the worse for drink. Nonetheless, the show proved very popular and it won Tony and Grammy Awards. When it finished, Moore stayed in the United States to pursue his film acting ambitions in Hollywood. Cook returned to Britain and in 1973, married the actress and model Judy Huxtable.

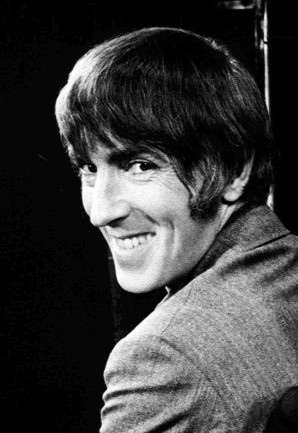
Cook in 1974

Later, the more risqué humour of Pete and Dud went further on such LPs as "Derek and Clive". The first recording was initiated by Cook to alleviate boredom during the Broadway run of Good Evening and used material conceived years before for the two characters but considered too outrageous. One of these audio recordings was also filmed and therein tensions between the duo are seen to rise. Chris Blackwell circulated bootleg copies to friends in the music business. The popularity of the recording convinced Cook to release it commercially, although Moore was initially reluctant, fearing that his rising fame as a Hollywood star would be undermined. Two further Derek and Clive albums were released, the last accompanied by a film.

Cook and Moore hosted Saturday Night Live on 24 January 1976 during the show's first season. They did a number of their classic stage routines, including "One Leg Too Few" and "Frog and Peach" among others, in addition to participating in some skits with the show's ensemble cast. In 1978, Cook appeared on the British music series Revolver as the manager of a ballroom where emerging punk and new wave acts played. For some groups, these were their first appearances on television. Cook's acerbic commentary was a distinctive aspect of the programme. In 1979, Cook recorded comedy-segments as B-sides to the Sparks 12-inch singles "Number One Song in Heaven" and "Tryouts for the Human Race". The main songwriter Ron Mael often began with a banal situation in his lyrics and then went at surreal tangents in the style of Cook and S. J. Perelman.

=== Amnesty International performances ===
Cook appeared at the first three fund-raising galas staged by Cleese and Martin Lewis on behalf of Amnesty International. From the third show in 1979 the benefits were dubbed The Secret Policeman's Balls. He performed on all three nights of the first show in April 1976, A Poke in the Eye (With a Sharp Stick), as an individual performer and as a member of the cast of Beyond the Fringe, which reunited for the first time since the 1960s. He also appeared in a Monty Python sketch, taking the place of Eric Idle. Cook was on the cast album of the show and in the film, Pleasure at Her Majesty's. He was in the second Amnesty gala in May 1977, An Evening Without Sir Bernard Miles. It was retitled The Mermaid Frolics for the cast album and TV special. Cook performed monologues and skits with Terry Jones.

In June 1979, Cook performed all four nights of The Secret Policeman's Ball, teaming with Cleese. Cook performed a couple of solo pieces and a sketch with Eleanor Bron. He also led the ensemble in the finale – the "End of the World" sketch from Beyond the Fringe.

In response to a barb in The Daily Telegraph that the show was recycled material, Cook wrote a satire of the summing-up by Justice Cantley in the trial of former Liberal Party leader Jeremy Thorpe, a summary now widely thought to show bias in favour of Thorpe. Cook performed it that same night (Friday 29 June – the third of the four nights) and the following night. The nine-minute opus, "Entirely a Matter for You", is considered by many fans and critics to be one of the finest works of Cook's career. Along with Cook, producer of the show Martin Lewis brought out an album on Virgin Records entitled Here Comes the Judge: Live, containing the live performance together with three studio tracks that further lampooned the Thorpe trial.

Although unable to take part in the 1981 gala, Cook supplied the narration over the animated opening title sequence of the 1982 film of the show. With Lewis, he wrote and voiced radio commercials to advertise the film in the UK. He also hosted a spoof film awards ceremony that was part of the world première of the film in London in March 1982.

Following Cook's 1987 stage reunion with Moore for the annual American benefit for the homeless, Comic Relief (not related to the UK Comic Relief benefits), Cook repeated the reunion for a British audience by performing with Moore at the 1989 Amnesty benefit The Secret Policeman's Biggest Ball.

=== Consequences album ===
Cook played multiple roles on the 1977 concept album Consequences, written and produced by former 10cc members Kevin Godley and Lol Creme. A mixture of spoken comedy and progressive rock with an environmental subtext, Consequences started as a single that Godley and Creme planned to make to demonstrate their invention, an electric guitar effect called the Gizmo, which they developed in 10cc. The project grew into a three-LP box set. The comedy sections were originally intended to be performed by a cast including Spike Milligan and Peter Ustinov, but Godley and Creme eventually settled on Cook once they realised he could perform most parts himself.

The storyline centres on the impending divorce of ineffectual Englishman Walter Stapleton (Cook) and his French wife Lulu (Judy Huxtable). While meeting their lawyers – the bibulous Mr. Haig and overbearing Mr. Pepperman (both played by Cook) – the encroaching global catastrophe interrupts proceedings with bizarre and mysterious happenings, which seem to centre on Mr. Blint (Cook), a musician and composer living in the flat below Haig's office, to which it is connected by a large hole in the floor.

Although it has since developed a cult following, Consequences was released as punk was sweeping the UK and proved a resounding commercial failure, savaged by critics who found the music self-indulgent. The script and story have evident connections to Cook's own life – his then-wife Judy Huxtable plays Walter's wife. Cook's struggles with alcohol are mirrored in Haig's drinking, and there is a parallel between the fictional divorce of Walter and Lulu and Cook's own divorce from his first wife. The voice and accent Cook used for the character of Stapleton are similar to those of Cook's Beyond the Fringe colleague, Alan Bennett, and a book on Cook's comedy, How Very Interesting: Peter Cook's Universe and All That Surrounds It, speculates that the characters Cook plays in Consequences are his verbal caricatures of the four Beyond the Fringe cast members – the alcoholic Haig represents Cook himself, the tremulous Stapleton is Bennett, the parodically Jewish Pepperman is Miller, and the pianist Blint represents Moore.

=== 1980s ===
Cook starred in the LWT special Peter Cook & Co. in 1980. The show included comedy sketches, including a Tales of the Unexpected parody "Tales of the Much As We Expected". This involved Cook as Roald Dahl, explaining his name had been Ronald before he dropped the "n". The cast included Cleese, Rowan Atkinson, Beryl Reid, Paula Wilcox, and Terry Jones. Partly spurred by Moore's growing film star status, Cook moved to Hollywood in that year, and appeared as an uptight English butler to a wealthy American woman in a short-lived United States television sitcom, The Two of Us, also making cameo appearances in a couple of undistinguished films.

In 1983, Cook played the role of Richard III in the first episode of Blackadder, "The Foretelling", which parodies Laurence Olivier's portrayal. In 1984, he played the role of Nigel, the mathematics teacher, in Jeannot Szwarc's film Supergirl, working alongside the evil Selena played by Faye Dunaway. He then narrated the short film Diplomatix by Norwegian comedy trio Kirkvaag, Lystad, and Mjøen, which won the "Special Prize of the City of Montreux" at the Montreux Comedy Festival in 1985. In 1986, he partnered Joan Rivers on her UK talk show. He appeared as Mr Jolly in 1987 in The Comic Strip Presents... episode "Mr. Jolly Lives Next Door", playing an assassin who covers the sound of his murders by playing Tom Jones records.

That same year, Cook appeared in The Princess Bride as the "Impressive Clergyman" who officiates at the wedding ceremony between Buttercup and Prince Humperdinck. He continued to appear in political-based work, starring as the Prime Minister in the 1986 dark comedy Whoops Apocalypse, and working with humourist Martin Lewis on a political satire about the 1988 US presidential elections for HBO, but the script went unproduced. Lewis suggested that Cook team with Moore for the US Comic Relief telethon for the homeless. The duo reunited and performed their "One Leg Too Few" sketch. Cook again collaborated with Moore for the 1989 Amnesty International benefit show, The Secret Policeman's Biggest Ball.

A 1984 commercial for John Harvey & Sons showed Cook at a poolside party drinking Harvey's Bristol Cream sherry. He then says to "throw away those silly little glasses" whereupon the other party guests toss their sunglasses in the swimming pool.

In 1988, Cook appeared as a contestant on the improvisation comedy show Whose Line Is It Anyway? He was declared the winner, his prize being to read the credits in the style of a New York cab driver – a character he had portrayed in Peter Cook & Co.

Cook occasionally called in to Clive Bull's night-time phone-in radio show on LBC in London. Using the name "Sven from Swiss Cottage", he mused on love, loneliness, and herrings in a mock Norwegian accent. Jokes included Sven's attempts to find his estranged wife, in which he often claimed to be telephoning the show from all over the world, and his dislike of his fellow Norwegians' obsession with fish. While Bull was clearly aware that Sven was fictional and was happy to play along with the joke, he did not learn of the caller's real identity until later.

=== Revival ===
In late 1989, Cook married for the third time, to Malaysian-born property developer Chiew Lin Chong in Torbay, Devon. She provided him with some stability in his personal life, and he reduced his drinking to the extent that for a time he was teetotal. He lived alone in a small 18th-century house in Perrins Walk, Hampstead, while she kept her own property just 100 yards (90 m) away.

Cook returned to the BBC as Sir Arthur Streeb-Greebling for an appearance with Ludovic Kennedy in A Life in Pieces (1990 TV series). The 12 interviews saw Sir Arthur recount his life, based on the song "Twelve Days of Christmas". Unscripted interviews with Cook as Streeb-Greebling and satirist Chris Morris were recorded in late 1993 and broadcast as Why Bother? on BBC Radio 3 in 1994. Morris described them:

It was a very different style of improvisation from what I'd been used to, working with people like Steve Coogan, Doon Mackichan and Rebecca Front, because On the Hour and The Day Today were about trying to establish a character within a situation, and Cook was really doing 'knight's move' and 'double knight's move' thinking to construct jokes or ridiculous scenes flipping back on themselves, and it was amazing. I mean, I held out no great hopes that he wouldn't be a boozy old sack of lard with his hair falling out and scarcely able to get a sentence out, because he hadn't given much evidence that that wouldn't be the case. But, in fact, he stumbled in with a Safeways bag full of Kestrel lager and loads of fags and then proceeded to skip about mentally with the agility of a grasshopper. Really quite extraordinary.

On 17 December 1993, Cook appeared on Clive Anderson Talks Back as four characters – biscuit tester and alien abductee Norman House, football manager and motivational speaker Alan Latchley, judge Sir James Beauchamp, and rock legend Eric Daley. The following day, he appeared on BBC2 performing links for Arena's "Radio Night". He also appeared in the 1993 Christmas special of One Foot in the Grave ("One Foot in the Algarve"), playing a muckraking tabloid photographer. Before the end of the following year, his mother died, and a grief-stricken Cook returned to heavy drinking. He made his last television appearance on the show Pebble Mill at One in November 1994.

== Personal life, health, and death ==
Cook was married three times. He married Wendy Snowden, whom he met at university, in 1963. They had two daughters. The couple divorced in 1971. Cook then married the actress Judy Huxtable, in 1973; the marriage ended in divorce in 1989, after they had been separated for some years. He married Chiew Lin Chong in 1989, to whom he remained married until his death. Cook became stepfather to Lin's daughter, Nina. Following Cook's death, Lin suffered from depression, deriving both from her loss and the difficulties arising from raising Nina, who had learning difficulties. She died aged 71, in November 2016.

Cook was an avid spectator of most popular English sports (except rugby league) and was a supporter of Tottenham Hotspur football club, though he also maintained support for his hometown team Torquay United.

Cook was a heavy smoker. As a regular interviewee on his friend Michael Parkinson's chat show Parkinson, he was usually to be seen with a lit cigarette in his hand or mouth during their broadcast interviews.

Cook died aged 57, whilst in a coma, on 9 January 1995, at the Royal Free Hospital in Hampstead, London, from a gastrointestinal haemorrhage, a complication resulting from years of heavy drinking. His body was cremated at Golders Green Crematorium, and his ashes were buried in an unmarked plot behind St John-at-Hampstead, not far from his home in Perrins Walk.

Dudley Moore attended Cook's memorial service at St John-at-Hampstead on 1 May 1995. He and Martin Lewis presented a two-night memorial for Cook at The Improv in Los Angeles, on 15 and 16 November 1995, to mark what would have been Cook's 58th birthday.

== Legacy ==
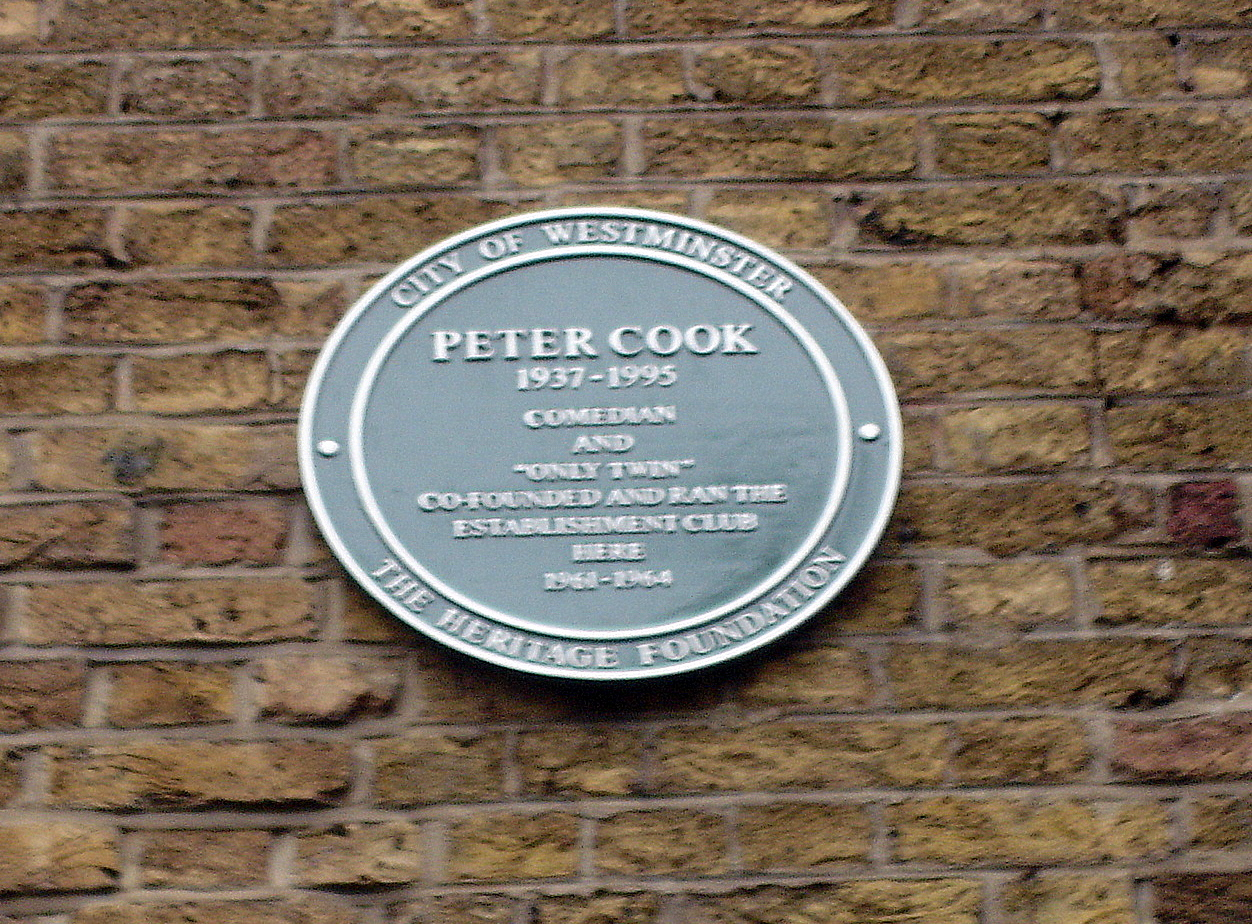
Cook's green plaque marking the site of the Establishment Club in Greek Street, Soho, London

Cook is widely acknowledged as a strong influence on the many British comedians who followed him from the amateur dramatic clubs of British universities to the Edinburgh Festival Fringe, and then to radio and television. On his death, some critics choose to see Cook's life as tragic, insofar as the brilliance of his youth had not been sustained in his later years. However, Cook maintained he was "comfortable with limited ambition" not necessarily for the sustained international success that Dudley Moore achieved. He assessed happiness by his friendships and his enjoyment of life. Eric Idle said Cook had not wasted his talent, but rather that the newspapers had tried to waste him.

In 1995 premiered Play Wisty For Me – The Life of Peter Cook, an original play to pay tribute to Cook.

Several friends honoured him with a dedication in the closing credits of Fierce Creatures (1997), a comedy film written by John Cleese about a zoo in peril of being closed. It starred Cleese alongside Jamie Lee Curtis, Kevin Kline, and Michael Palin. The dedication displays photos and the lifespan dates of Cook and of naturalist and humorist Gerald Durrell.

In 1999, the minor planet 20468 Petercook, in the main asteroid belt, was named after Cook.

Channel 4 broadcast Not Only But Always, a television film dramatising the relationship between Cook and Moore, with Rhys Ifans portraying Cook. At the 2005 Edinburgh Festival Fringe, a play, Pete and Dud: Come Again written by Chris Bartlett and Nick Awde, examined the relationship from Moore's view. The play was transferred to London's West End at The Venue in 2006 and toured the UK the following year. During the West End run, Tom Goodman-Hill starred as Cook, with Kevin Bishop as Moore.

A green plaque to honour Cook was unveiled by the Westminster City Council and the Heritage Foundation at the site of the Establishment Club, at 18 Greek Street, on 15 February 2009.

A blue plaque was unveiled by the Torbay Civic Society on 17 November 2014 at Cook's place of birth, "Shearbridge", Middle Warberry Road, Torquay, with his widow Lin and other members of the family in attendance. A further blue plaque was commissioned and erected at the home of Torquay United, Plainmoor, Torquay, in 2015.

== Filmography ==
=== Film ===
- Bachelor of Hearts (1958) – Pedestrian in Street (uncredited)
- Ten Thousand Talents (short film, 1960) – voice
- What's Going on Here (TV film, 1963)
- The Wrong Box (1966) – Morris Finsbury
- Alice in Wonderland (TV film, 1966) – Mad Hatter
- Bedazzled (1967) – George Spiggott / The Devil
- A Dandy in Aspic (1968) – Prentiss
- Monte Carlo or Bust! (released in the US as Those Daring Young Men in Their Jaunty Jalopies) (1969) – Maj. Digby Dawlish
- The Bed Sitting Room (1969) – Inspector
- The Rise and Rise of Michael Rimmer (1970) – Michael Rimmer
- Behind the Fridge (TV film, 1971) – Various Characters
- An Apple a Day (TV film, 1971) – Mr Elwood Sr.
- The Adventures of Barry McKenzie (1972) – Dominic
- Saturday Night at the Baths (1975) – Himself, in theatre audience (uncredited)
- Find the Lady (1976) – Lewenhak
- Eric Sykes Shows a Few of Our Favourite Things (TV film, 1977) – Stagehand
- The Hound of the Baskervilles (1978) – Sherlock Holmes
- Derek and Clive Get the Horn (1979) – Clive
- Peter Cook & Co. (TV Special, 1980) – Various Characters
- Yellowbeard (1983) – Lord Percy Lambourn
- Supergirl (1984) – Nigel
- Kenny Everett's Christmas Carol (TV movie, 1985) – Ghost of Christmas Yet To Come
- The Myth (1986) – Himself
- The Princess Bride (1987) – The Impressive Clergyman
- Whoops Apocalypse (1988) – Sir Mortimer Chris
- Without a Clue (1988) – Norman Greenhough
- Jake's Journey (TV movie, 1988) – King
- Getting It Right (1989) – Mr Adrian
- Great Balls of Fire! (1989) – First English Reporter
- The Craig Ferguson Story (TV film, 1991) – Fergus Ferguson
- Black Beauty (1994) – Lord Wexmire (final film role)
- Peter Cook Talks Golf Balls (video, 1994) – played four characters: Alec Dunroonie / Dieter Liedbetter / Major Titherly Glibble / Bill Rossi

=== Television ===
- Chronicle (1964) – presenter (one episode)
- A Series of Bird's (1967) – (1 episode)
- Not Only... But Also (1965–70) – Various Characters (22 episodes)
- Not Only But Also. Peter Cook and Dudley Moore in Australia (miniseries, 1971)
- Thirty-Minute Theatre (1972) – Peter Trilby (1 episode)
- NBC's Saturday Night (1976) – Co-host (1 episode)
- Revolver (1978) (8 episodes)
- The Two of Us (1981–1982) – Robert Brentwood (20 episodes)
- The Black Adder (1983) – Richard III (first episode, "The Foretelling")
- Diplomatix (TV Short, 1985) – Narrator (voice)
- Mr. Jolly Lives Next Door (1987, part of The Comic Strip Presents... series) – Mr Jolly
- The Best of... What's Left of... Not Only... But Also (1990) – Pete / Himself / other characters (one episode)
- A Life in Pieces (1990 TV series) – Sir Arthur Streeb-Greebling (12 episodes)
- Roger Mellie: The Man on the Telly (1991) – Roger Mellie (voice)
- Gone to Seed (1992) – Wesley Willis (six episodes)
- Arena (1993) – himself (two episodes)
- One Foot in the Grave (1993 Christmas special) – Martin Trout

=== Amnesty International performances ===
- Pleasure at Her Majesty's (1976)
- The Mermaid Frolics (1977)
- The Secret Policeman's Ball (1979)
- The Secret Policeman's Private Parts (1981) – Intro narrator
- The Secret Policeman's Biggest Ball (1989)
- The Best of Amnesty: Featuring the Stars of Monty Python (1999)

== Discography ==
UK chart singles:

- "The Ballad of Spotty Muldoon" (1965)
- "Goodbye-ee" (1965)

both with Dudley Moore

Albums:

- Bridge on the River Wye (1962)
- The Misty Mr. Wisty (Decca, 1965)
- Not Only Peter Cook... But Also Dudley Moore (Decca, 1965)
- Once Moore with Cook (with Dudley Moore) (Decca, 1966)
- Peter Cook and Dudley Moore Cordially Invite You to Go to Hell! (1967)
- Goodbye Again (with Dudley Moore) (Decca, 1968)
- Not Only But Also (with Dudley Moore) (Decca, 1971)
- Behind the Fridge (with Dudley Moore) (1972) Aus #35
- The World of Pete & Dud (Decca, 1974)
- Derek and Clive (Live) (with Dudley Moore) (1976)
- Derek and Clive Come Again (with Dudley Moore) (1977)
- Derek and Clive Ad Nauseam (with Dudley Moore) (1978)
