= E. L. Wisty =

Fictional character created and portrayed by Peter Cook

E. L. Wisty was a fictional character created and played by the comedian Peter Cook on and off throughout his career. A bland, monotonal know-it-all, Wisty usually appeared in monologues, or in two-handed sketches in which he bores the other person. According to British comedy scholar Roger Wilmut, "The striking thing about E. L. Wisty was that he never smiled—Cook managed to keep a straight face throughout, despite the audience laughter."

== History ==
The character was originally known as Mr Boylett, after the table butler at Radley College, the school Cook attended. Cook started by doing impressions of the real Mr Boylett, telling bizarre tales including that of the Holy Bee of Ephesus, which flew three times round the crucified Jesus, and stories of how Mr Boylett bought various inanimate objects after he thought he saw them move. Cook was encouraged to transfer these tales to stage monologues when he was a student at the University of Cambridge. It was then that he changed the name of the character, first to Mr Arthur Grole, then to E. L. Wisty.

Wisty appears in a sketch in Beyond the Fringe involving his aspirations to become a judge, though his lack of Latin has caused him to fail "the rigorous judging exams". This has led to his becoming a coal miner instead, since on the miners' exam "They only ask you one question. They ask, 'Who are you?' and I got 75 per cent on that."

In later sketches Wisty became known for bothering members of the public on park benches with his monologues on topics including tadpoles, royalty, newts, peace through nudism, inalienable rights and his (equally fictional) friend Spotty Muldoon. His foils were such comic actors as John Cleese and John Bird.

In 1964 Wisty and Spotty formed the World Domination League, with aspirations to dominate the world by 1958 [sic]. Cook enlisted a secretary at Private Eye to send out postcards announcing: "We shall move about in people's rooms and say, 'Excuse me, we are the World Domination League. May we dominate you?' Then, if they say 'Get out,' of course we give up." The postcard also listed the league's demands:

1. Total domination of the world by 1958.
2. Domination of the astral spheres quite soon too.
3. The finding of lovely ladies for Spotty Muldoon within the foreseeable future.
4. Getting a nuclear arm to deter with.
5. The bodily removal from this planet of C. P. Snow and Alan Freeman and their replacement with fine trees.
6. Stopping the government from crawling up our pipes and listening to all we say.
7. Training bees for uses against foreign powers, and so on.
8. Elimination of spindly insects and encouragement of lovely little newts who dance about and are happy.
9. E. L. Wisty for God.
