= The Secret Policeman's Ball (disambiguation) =

The Secret Policeman's Ball may refer to:

- The Secret Policeman's Ball, the series of Amnesty benefit shows and spin-offs from 1976 onwards, including:
  - The Secret Policeman's Ball (1979), the 1979 Amnesty International benefit show (and the spin-off film, TV special and two albums) that gave the series its title
  - The Secret Policeman's Other Ball, the 1981 Amnesty benefit show (and the spin-off two films, two albums and book)
  - The Secret Policeman's Ball 2006, the 2006 Amnesty benefit show (and the spin-off TV special and DVD)
  - The Secret Policeman's Ball 2008, the 2008 Amnesty benefit show (and the spin-off TV special)
  - The Secret Policeman's Ball 2012, the 2012 Amnesty benefit show
  - The Secret Policeman's Balls (DVD box set), a 3-disc compilation featuring performances recorded through the late 1980s, released in 2009
