= The Secret Policeman's Ball mediagraphy =

This is a list of audio, video and film releases of The Secret Policeman's Ball series of charity shows.

== Theatrical films made from the shows ==
=== UK film releases ===
Title	Director	Producer	Executive Producer	Show director	Show producer	Stage year	Release year	Notes
Pleasure At Her Majesty’s	Roger Graef	Roger Graef	Peter Luff	Jonathan Miller	John Cleese, David Simpson, Peter Luff & Martin Lewis	1976	1977	100-minute documentary featuring rehearsals, backstage footage and performance of the 1976 show A Poke In The Eye (With A Sharp Stick)
The Secret Policeman’s Ball	Roger Graef	Roger Graef & Thomas Schwalm	Martin Lewis & Peter Walker	John Cleese	Martin Lewis & Peter Walker	1979	1980	94-minute concert performance film of the 1979 show of the same name
The Secret Policeman’s Other Ball	Julien Temple	Martin Lewis & Peter Walker		John Cleese & Ron Eyre	Martin Lewis & Peter Walker	1981	1982	99-minute concert performance film of the 1981 show of the same name

=== US film releases ===
Title	Director	Producer	Executive Producer	Year	Notes
Monty Python Meets Beyond The Fringe	Roger Graef	Roger Graef & Thomas Schwalm	Peter Luff & Martin Lewis	1978	Documentary featuring rehearsals, backstage footage and performance of the 1976 show A Poke In The Eye (With A Sharp Stick). This was the Pleasure At Her Majesty’s film misleadingly re-titled by the US distributor (without Amnesty’s permission) for the American market. This US theatrical version differed from the UK theatrical release. Approximately 15 minutes of behind-the-scenes documentary footage was cut from the original film.
The Secret Policeman’s Other Ball (USA Version)		Martin Lewis	Harvey Weinstein & Bob Weinstein	1982	110-minute concert film amalgamating footage from the two original UK films of the 1979 show and the 1981 show. With new, specially-created opening sequence. Original footage directed by Julien Temple & Roger Graef. Original footage produced by Martin Lewis & Peter Walker.

=== Australia/NZ film releases ===
Title	Release date	Notes
The Secret Policeman’s Ball	1981	UK theatrical version
The Secret Policeman’s Other Ball	1982	UK theatrical version

== TV specials made from the shows ==
The premiere broadcast of each TV special, listed in chronological sequence (This list excludes TV transmissions of films that had received prior theatrical release)

=== UK TV broadcasts ===
Title	Director	Producer	Executive Producer	Show director	Show producer	Year	Network	Notes
Pleasure At Her Majesty’s	Roger Graef	Roger Graef	David Simpson, Peter Luff & Martin Lewis	Jonathan Miller	John Cleese, David Simpson, Peter Luff & Martin Lewis	1976	BBC 1	100-minute documentary featuring rehearsals, backstage footage and performance of the 1976 show A Poke In The Eye (With A Sharp Stick).
The Mermaid Frolics	Roger Graef	Roger Graef	Peter Luff & Martin Lewis	Terry Jones	Martin Lewis & Peter Luff	1977	ITV Network via Granada TV	60-minute TV special of performances from the 1977 show 'An Evening Without Sir Bernard Miles
The Secret Policeman’s Ball	Roger Graef	Roger Graef & Thomas Schwalm	Martin Lewis & Peter Walker	John Cleese	Martin Lewis & Peter Walker	1979	ITV Network via London Weekend TV	60-minute TV special of highlights from the 1979 stage show of the same name. This was NOT the full-length 94-minute film released theatrically in 1980, though most sequences were also in the theatrical film.
The Secret Policeman’s Third Ball – The Music	Ken O’Neill	Neville Bolt & Tony Hollingsworth				1989	Channel 4	60-minute TV special of music performances from the 1987 shows. Transmitted after its home-video release
The Secret Policeman’s Third Ball	Ken O’Neill	Neville Bolt & Tony Hollingsworth				1991	Channel 4	95-minute TV special of performances from the 1987 shows. Transmitted after its home-video release.
The Secret Policeman’s Biggest Ball	Mike Holgate	Judith Holder				1989	ITV Network	70-minute TV special of performances from the 1989 show of the same name
Barf Bites Back						1991	ITV Network via London Weekend TV	60-minute TV special of show held to celebrate Amnesty's 30th anniversary
Big 30 – Amnesty’s 30th Anniversary Special	David G. Hillier	Dave Morely & Graham K. Smith				1991	ITV Network via Central TV	120-minute TV show specially created as celebration of Amnesty's 30th anniversary
So You Think You’re Irish	Gerard Stembridge		John Sutton			1997	ITV Network via Granada TV	80-minute TV special
So You Think You’re Irish 2	Gerard Stembridge		Producer: John Sutton & Sean Love			1998	ITV Network via Granada TV	3 x 30-minute TV episodes
We Know Where You Live, Live!		Lisa Chapman & Richard Parker	Malcolm Gerrie & Andy Ward	Eddie Izzard	Katherine Allen	2001	Channel 4	100-minute TV special of performances from the 2001 show of the same name.
The Secret Policeman’s Ball 2006						2006	Channel 4	70-minute TV special of highlights from the 2006 show.
The Secret Policeman’s Ball 2008						2008	Channel 4	TV special of highlights from the 2008 show.

=== US TV broadcasts ===
Title	Director	Executive Producer	Music	Original footage by	Year	Network	Notes
The Secret Policeman's Private Parts	Martin Lewis	Harvey Weinstein & Bob Weinstein	Alan Brewer	Julien Temple, Roger Graef, Martin Lewis & Peter Walker	1983	HBO/Cinemax	80-minute compilation from the 1976 and 1977 shows; sequences from the 1979 and 1981 shows that had not been incorporated in the USA theatrical version of The Secret Policeman's Other Ball; unused outtakes from all four shows. With new, specially-created opening and interstitial sequences.

=== Related TV shows (UK & US) ===
- Sky At Westminster Abbey (1981) – 75-minute concert celebrating Amnesty's 20th Anniversary
- Conspiracy of Hope (1986) – All-day concert celebrating Amnesty International
- Human Rights Now! (1988) – Concert celebrating Amnesty International
- The Secret Policeman's Retro Ball! (1992) – 60-minute documentary on history of rock musician support for Amnesty
- The Secret Policeman's Concert (1992) -60-minute compilation of rock performances for Amnesty
- Free to Laugh: A Comedy and Music Special for Amnesty International -TV special video-taped at the Wiltern Theater, Hollywood on Sunday March 8, 1992
- Amnesty International Concert for Human Rights (1998) -Paris concert celebrating 50th Anniversary of Universal Declaration Of Human Rights
- Remember The Secret Policeman's Ball? (2004)- 75-minute documentary about the Amnesty shows

== DVD box set ==
The Secret Policeman's Balls is a three-disc DVD box set released by Shout! Factory in the United States and Canada on 27 January 2009. The discs record comedic and musical performances given at a series of fund-raising events for Amnesty International known collectively as The Secret Policeman's Balls, the performances are from events between 1976 and 1989.

The box set includes five films: Pleasure at Her Majesty's (1976), The Secret Policeman’s Ball (1979), The Secret Policeman's Other Ball (1981), The Secret Policeman’s Third Ball (1987) and The Secret Policeman’s Biggest Ball (1989).

Performers featured include members of Monty Python, namely John Cleese, Graham Chapman, Terry Gilliam, Terry Jones and Michael Palin, performers from the early-1960s Satire Boom, such as Peter Cook, Dudley Moore, Alan Bennett and Jonathan Miller, as well then up-and-coming performers such as Rowan Atkinson, Stephen Fry, Hugh Laurie, and Jennifer Saunders.

The box set also contains performances by musicians, Pete Townshend, Sting, Phil Collins, Bob Geldof, Peter Gabriel, Jackson Browne, Lou Reed, Kate Bush and Joan Armatrading, plus duets from Eric Clapton and Jeff Beck, and Mark Knopfler and Chet Atkins.

Also included is a BBC documentary Remember The Secret Policeman’s Ball, and some performances from The Mermaid Frolics (1977) and introductions and commentaries from executive producer Martin Lewis, who also provided the sleeve notes.

== Audio recordings made from the shows ==
=== UK – Audio releases ===
Title	Producer	Release date	Label	Notes
A Poke In The Eye (With A Sharp Stick)	Martin Lewis	1976	Transatlantic Records	Album of highlights of the 1976 show
The Mermaid Frolics	Martin Lewis	1977	Polydor Records	Album of comedy & music highlights of the 1977 An Evening Without Sir Bernard Miles
Here Comes The Judge	Martin Lewis	1979	Virgin Records	Mini-album featuring Peter Cook's "Entirely A Matter For You" monologue from "The Secret Policeman’s Ball"
The Secret Policeman’s Ball	Martin Lewis	1979	Island Records	Album of comedy highlights of the 1979 show
The Secret Policeman’s Ball – The Music	Martin Lewis	1980	Island Records	12” EP of music highlights of the 1979 show
Neil Innes: Protest Song	Martin Lewis	1980	Warner Bros. Records	Single of Neil Innes' performance of "Protest Song" from "A Poke In The Eye (With A Sharp Stick)"
The Secret Policeman’s Other Ball	Martin Lewis	1981	Springtime!/Island Records	Album of comedy highlights of the 1981 show
The Secret Policeman’s Other Ball – The Music	Martin Lewis	1982	Springtime!/Island Records	Album of music highlights of the 1981 show
The Secret Policeman’s Third Ball		1987	Virgin Records	Album of comedy highlights of the 1987 show
The Secret Policeman’s Third Ball – The Music		1987	Virgin Records	Album of music highlights of the 1987 show
The Secret Policeman’s Ball	Martin Lewis	1991	Laughing Stock	Cassette-only reissue of original 1979 comedy album
The Complete 'A Poke In The Eye (With A Sharp Stick)	Martin Lewis	1992	Springtime!/Castle	First CD release of original 1976 album. Issued with bonus disc of unreleased material
The Complete 'Secret Policeman’s Other Ball	Martin Lewis	1992	Springtime!/Castle	First CD release of original 1981 album. Issued with bonus disc of unreleased material
The Secret Policeman’s Other Ball – The Music	Martin Lewis	1992	Springtime!/Castle Communications	First UK CD release of album of music highlights of the 1981 show

=== US/Canada – Audio releases ===
Title	Producer	Release date	Label	Notes
The Secret Policeman’s Ball – The Music	Martin Lewis	1980	Atco/Atlantic Records	Album of highlights of the 1979 show
The Secret Policeman’s Other Ball – The Music	Martin Lewis	1982	Island/Warner Bros. Records	Album of music highlights of the 1981 show
The Secret Policeman’s Third Ball – The Music		1987	Virgin Records	Album of music highlights of the 1987 show
The Secret Policeman’s Other Ball – The Music	Martin Lewis	1992	Springtime!/Rhino Records	First US CD release of album of music highlights of the 1981 show. Released to celebrate the 10th anniversary of the album's original release in 1982
Dead Parrot Society: The Best Of British Comedy	Martin Lewis	1993	Springtime!/Rhino Records	Compilation CD includes first US release of comedy content from the 1976 & 1981 shows

=== CD Booklet notes ===
- The Complete A Poke In The Eye – CD release Springtime!/Castle 1992
- The Complete Secret Policeman's Other Ball – CD release Springtime!/Castle 1992
- The Secret Policeman's Concert – CD release Springtime!/Castle 1992
- The Secret Policeman's Other Ball – The Music – CD release Springtime!/Rhino 1992
- Dead Parrot Society – CD release Springtime!/Rhino 1993
