= The Iron Lady (album) =

Studio album by Janet Brown & John Wells
- Released: October 1979. Reissued April 2013
- Recorded: Summer 1979
- Genres: Comedy, Satire
- Length: 60 minutes
- Labels: Logo Records; Reissue: Springtime! Records
- Producers: John Lloyd & Martin Lewis

The Iron Lady is a 1979 British comedy album spoofing the life of Margaret Thatcher (1925–2013), the long-serving (1979–1990) Prime Minister of the United Kingdom. The album was written by Private Eye writer and satirist John Wells. It was a precursor to his later work lampooning Thatcher in the Dear Bill series of letters that appeared in Private Eye (and in book form) and the 1981 stage farce, Anyone for Denis? The album was produced by John Lloyd whose credits include the comedy television programmes Not the Nine O'Clock News, Spitting Image, Blackadder, and QI - and Martin Lewis the co-creator and producer of the Secret Policeman's Ball series.

For Lloyd, like Wells, working on the Thatcher album was a preparation for his future work spoofing Thatcher. In 1984 he created and produced the BAFTA Award-winning satirical puppet show Spitting Image that aired on the ITV network from 1984 to 1996 - in which Margaret Thatcher was the most notable protagonist.

The album starred noted Thatcher impressionist Janet Brown, in the role of Margaret Thatcher, with other roles (both male and female) portrayed by John Wells.

The album was released in the UK by Logo Records in October 1979, just five months after Thatcher became Prime Minister. Brown promoted the album appearing as Thatcher singing the album's theme song Iron Lady on the BBC TV programme Top of the Pops on 25 October 1979, Brown also made a surprise appearance dressed up as Thatcher at that year's Labour Party Conference in Brighton as a publicity stunt to launch the album and was photographed with surprised politicians Tony Benn and Barbara Castle who both initially believed that Brown was actually their nemesis Thatcher.

The album was deleted in the early 1980s and was unavailable until it was reissued digitally in 2013 immediately following Thatcher's death. In interviews in major national newspapers published shortly after Thatcher died, the album's co-producer, Martin Lewis disclosed that the album had not sold well on its initial release, which he attributed to the fact that just four months after her election as Prime Minister, Thatcher was "still in her honeymoon period". In the interviews Lewis recounted an encounter he had with Thatcher at a reception in her honour at the home of the British Consul-General in Los Angeles in November 1991 - just one year after her resignation as Prime Minister. On learning that Lewis had produced the infamous album that had satirized her early in her premiership, Thatcher enquired how the album had sold. Lewis informed her that the sales had been poor because of her then high popularity. In response Thatcher quipped "You should reissue it! I think it'll find a much bigger audience now."

In April 2013, the album was reissued by Lewis' Springtime! Records label and made available digitally. Two singles of songs from the album were also issued, "The Iron Lady" (the album's title song) and "I'm There!" (described as "an orgasmic dance track"). A website, Facebook page, and a Twitter feed, were also launched.

Asked about the timing of the reissue, Lewis stated: "After her passing, I thought carefully about all the contributions that Margaret Thatcher had made to Britain and the world during her decades in politics. And I thought that I should honor those contributions by following her advice. So I am reissuing the album. She asked for it, and I certainly think she deserves it."

== See also ==
Cultural depictions of Margaret Thatcher
