= A Conspiracy of Hope =

1986 benefit concert tour

- Benefit tour by Amnesty International
- Location: United States
- Start date: June 4, 1986
- End date: June 15, 1986
- Legs: 1
- No. of shows: 6
- Attendance: 116,116
- Box office: $4.041 million ($11.59 million in 2024 dollars)
Amnesty International benefit events chronology
The Secret Policeman's Other Ball (1981)	A Conspiracy of Hope (1986)	Human Rights Now! (1988)
U2 tour chronology
The Unforgettable Fire Tour (1984–1985)	A Conspiracy of Hope (1986)	The Joshua Tree Tour (1987)
The Police tour chronology
Synchronicity Tour (1983–1984)	A Conspiracy of Hope (1986)	Reunion Tour (2007–2008)

A Conspiracy of Hope was a short tour of six benefit concerts on behalf of Amnesty International that took place in the United States during June 1986. The purpose of the tour was not to raise funds but rather to increase awareness of human rights and of Amnesty's work on its 25th anniversary. The shows were headlined by U2, Sting and Bryan Adams and also featured Peter Gabriel, Lou Reed, Joan Baez, and the Neville Brothers. The last three shows featured a reunion of the Police. At press conferences in each city, at related media events, and through their music at the concerts themselves, the artists engaged with the public on themes of human rights and human dignity. The six concerts were the first of what subsequently became known collectively as the Human Rights Concerts – a series of music events and tours staged by Amnesty International USA between 1986 and 1998.

== Background ==
The tour was conceived by the Executive Director of Amnesty International's U.S. section, Jack Healey. The tour was run by famed concert promoter Bill Graham, who served as executive producer along with Healey and Mary Daly, also of Amnesty. James Radner was "Concerts for Freedom" manager for the tour. In developing the tour, Healey drew on his relationship with Martin Lewis who had first recruited rock musicians such as Pete Townshend, Sting and Peter Gabriel to work with Amnesty several years before for The Secret Policeman's Ball's series of benefit shows in England (1976–1981).

== Performances ==
List of tour dates with date, city, country, venue, attendance, gross, references
Date (1986)	City	Country	Venue	Attendance	Gross	Ref(s)
June 4	Daly City	United States	Cow Palace	15,944 / 15,944	$468,300	
June 6	Inglewood	United States	The Forum	13,380 / 13,380	$558,040	
June 8	Denver	United States	McNichols Sports Arena	8,368 / 11,700	$282,880	
June 11	Atlanta	United States	Omni Coliseum	11,592 / 11,592	$397,515	
June 13	Rosemont	United States	Rosemont Horizon	16,625 / 16,625	$577,955	
June 15	East Rutherford	United States	Giants Stadium	50,207 / 50,207	$1,757,245	
TOTAL				116,116 / 119,448 (97%)	$4,041,935	

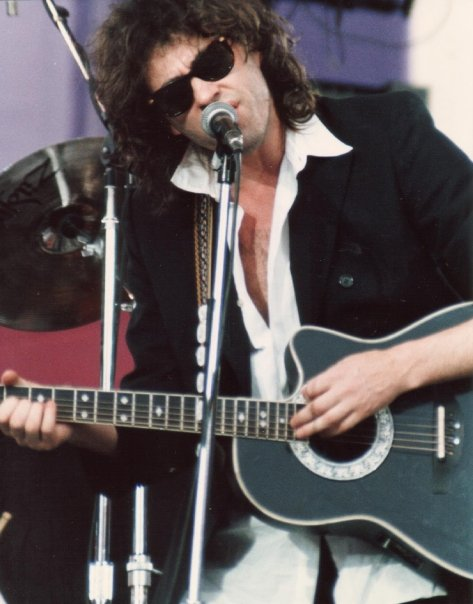
Bob Geldof performing at the Conspiracy of Hope concert on June 15, 1986, in East Rutherford, New Jersey.

The final show at Giants Stadium was an all-day event, running from noon until 11 p.m., at an outdoor stadium rather than the indoor arenas used for the first five concerts. The following additional artists performed at this concert (in order): John Eddie (with guests Max Weinberg and 14 Karat Soul), Third World, the Hooters, Peter Paul & Mary, Little Steven & The Disciples of Soul (with guests Darlene Love and John Waite), Bob Geldof (also with guests Darlene Love, Paul Shaffer, and John Waite), Stanley Jordan, Joan Armatrading, Jackson Browne, Rubén Blades (with Fela and Carlos Santana), Nona Hendryx, Yoko Ono, Howard Jones, and Miles Davis. The show then continued with the regular performers (in order) of the Neville Brothers, Joan Baez (Baez and the Nevilles also performed a number of songs together), Lou Reed, Peter Gabriel, Bryan Adams, Joni Mitchell (special to NJ), U2, the Police (with Bono during the song "Invisible Sun") and finally everyone came out together to perform "I Shall Be Released".

Stage introductions were made by Bill Graham, Senator Bill Bradley, Robert De Niro, Christopher Reeve, Michael J. Fox, Daryl Hannah and Muhammad Ali. The show was televised in its entirety by MTV, with the final three hours syndicated on broadcast television by Viacom. Westwood One aired the concert as a live radio broadcast. Pre-taped public service announcements about human rights by prominent figures in the entertainment world were presented on giant video screens and during the television broadcast.

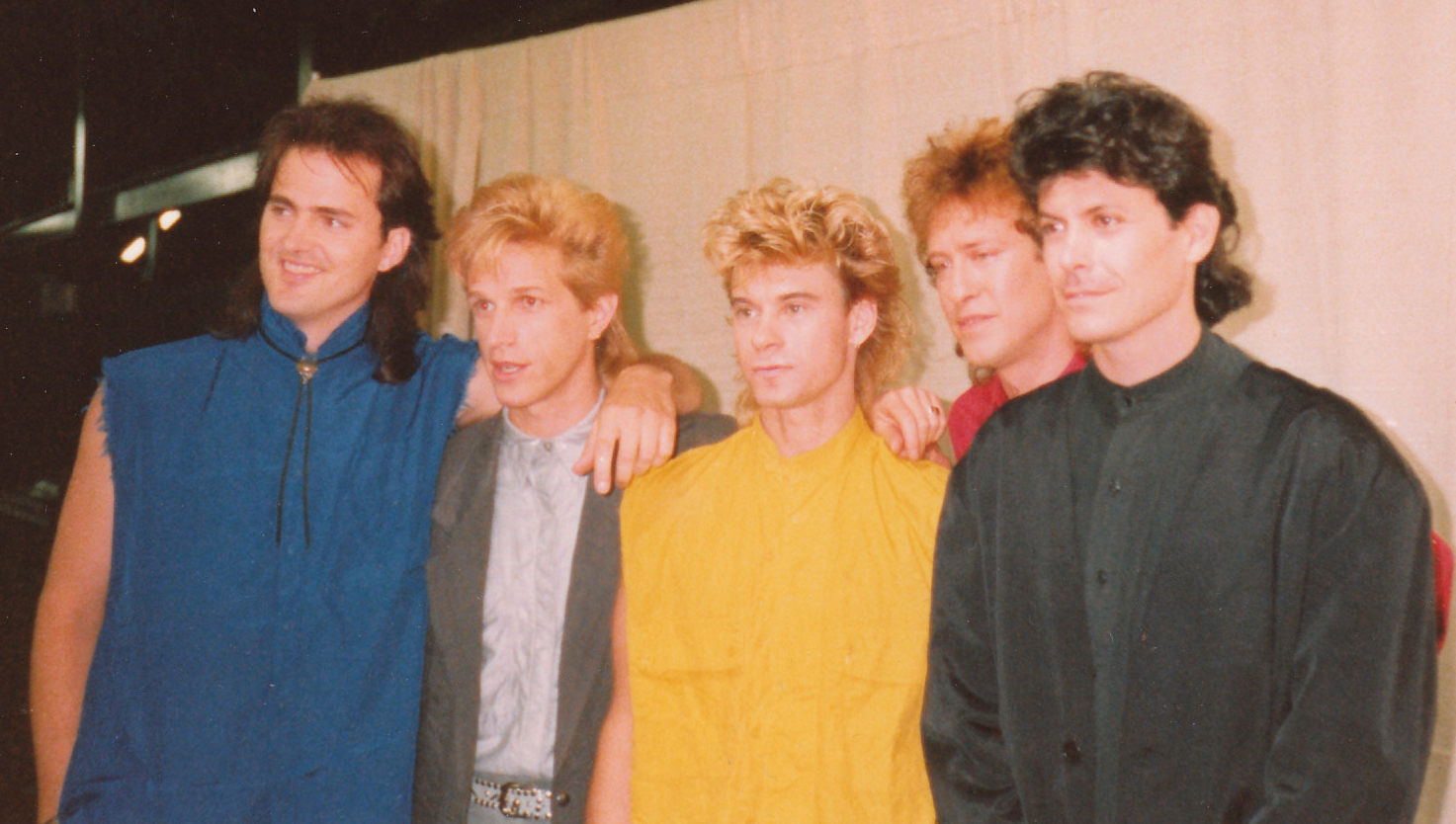
The Hooters backstage at A Conspiracy of Hope

Jackson Browne had also performed at the San Francisco and Los Angeles shows. Robin Williams had performed an impromptu stand-up set at the Chicago show. Madonna and Sean Penn introduced Bryan Adams at the opening night in San Francisco.

The pioneer of rock music for Amnesty, Pete Townshend, was scheduled to perform at the Giants Stadium concert, but had to cancel at the last moment when his father, Cliff Townshend, became gravely ill, necessitating his immediate return to London. This would have been Townshend's first ever US solo appearance.

== Musical themes ==
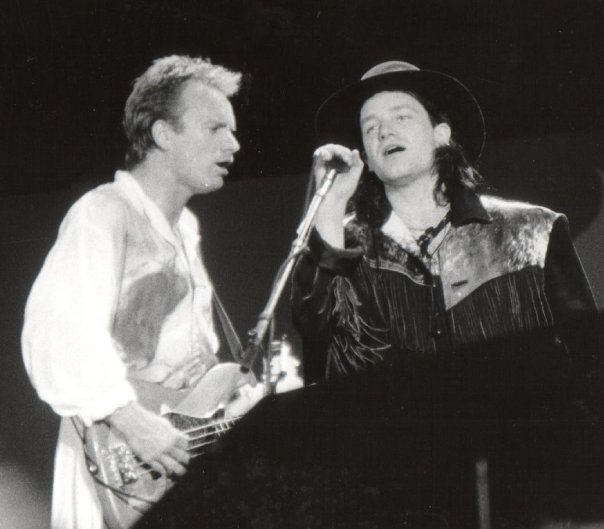
Sting and Bono performing "Invisible Sun" on June 15, 1986, at Giants Stadium.

The tour artists generally arranged their sets around themes of politics, freedom, and courage. Multiple performers joined U2 for Little Steven's "Sun City", while the assembled multitude sang Bob Dylan's "I Shall Be Released" at the end. Bono sometimes joined the Police for the Troubles-flavored "Invisible Sun", while Fela and Santana joined the Neville Brothers as well. Some of the less rock-oriented acts lost crowd attention during the long Giants Stadium event (including Joni Mitchell, who admonished the audience from the stage for their rowdy behavior during her set), although Baez was well received with a diverse set that included a rousing version of "The Times They Are a-Changin'", as well as Fela and the Nevilles assisting her on "Let It Be" and Tears for Fears' "Shout". Curt Smith of Tears for Fears was in the audience at the Cow Palace show, and joined Baez and the Nevilles on that show's performance of this song.

The tour enhanced the growing stature of both Peter Gabriel and U2, who were on upswings of popularity and whose songs "Shock the Monkey" and "Bad" respectively showed percussive, hypnotic power in large settings. Sting was originally slated for the tour as a solo performer with his touring band, but he reconvened the Police for the final three concerts (with their first appearance, in Atlanta, being unannounced) to further assist Amnesty's fund-raising and profile-raising with the enhanced value of a Police reunion. These were the last public Police performances until their Rock and Roll Hall of Fame induction in 2003.

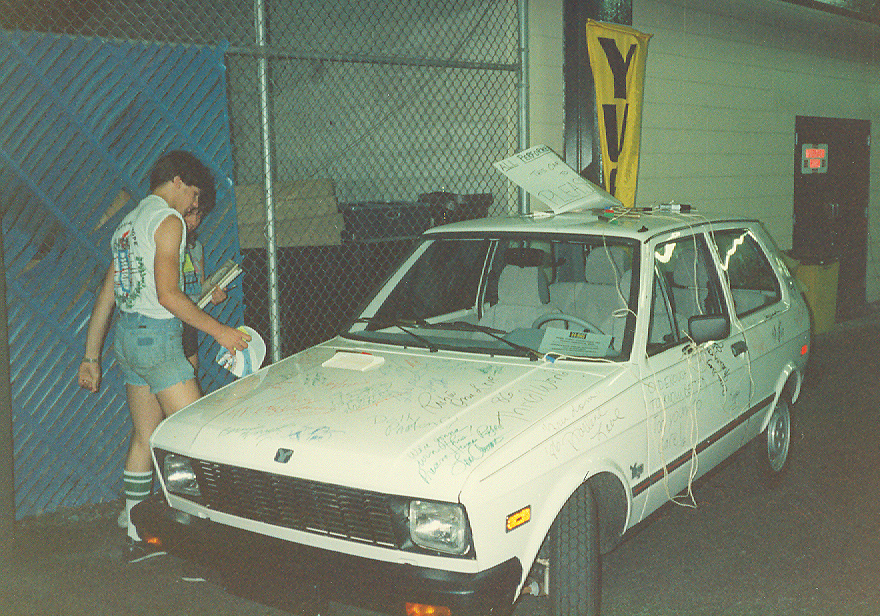
Yugo backstage at Giants Stadium, signed by performers at the Giants Stadium concert.

Yugo, the Yugoslavian auto manufacturer was a sponsor of the final concert at Giants Stadium and supplied a car backstage at the Giants Stadium show. The car was autographed by the performers and celebrities who made on-stage announcements at the show. The vehicle's whereabouts today are unknown.

== Impact ==
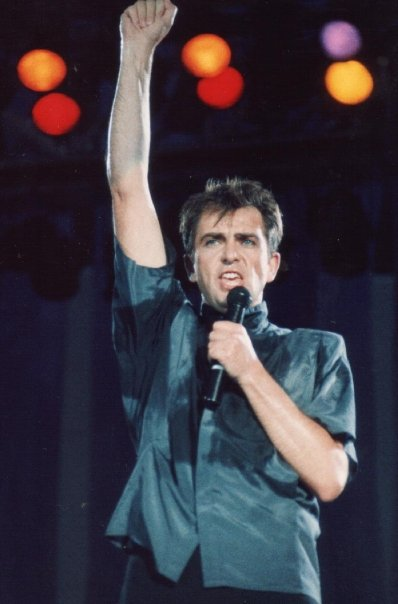
Peter Gabriel performing on June 15, 1986, in East Rutherford, New Jersey.

Inevitably there were some who wondered whether attendees were understanding the message of the event or simply there for the music. A Philadelphia rock radio station sent an interviewer into the Giants Stadium concessions line, who seemed shocked to encounter an audience member who not only knew what Amnesty was but was a member.

Bono addressed the doubters and cynics in an interview in Rolling Stone shortly before the tour began in which he said that he knew first-hand the value of attending such shows: "The audience is going to be great. I know that because I was part of that audience once. I saw 'The Secret Policeman's Ball' and it became a part of me ... It sowed a seed."

On Monday June 16, the morning after the final show at Giants Stadium in New Jersey, Sting, Peter Gabriel, tour promoter Bill Graham and Amnesty director Jack Healey were guests on the Today Show. Host Bryant Gumbel asked, "I don't think any of us would quibble about the worth of the cause but what leads you to believe that anybody left with anything more than a smile?"

Sting responded:

I've been a member of Amnesty for five years and a supporter because of an entertainment show which was called 'The Secret Policeman's Ball' which I was involved in. And before that I didn't know about Amnesty's work and so in a sense I'm a success story. I know that these kind of events work. I'm sure that there were 80,000 people there last night a good proportion of them will want to be supporters and who will want to carry on the work.

One month after the tour, the membership of Amnesty International in the United States had increased by 45,000 members. Concert-goers had been asked to send appeals for freedom on behalf of six prisoners of conscience, two of whom were released within months after the tour.
