= The Secret Policeman's Ball 2012 =

2012 Amnesty benefit show

The Secret Policeman's Ball 2012 was the title of the show staged as a benefit for human rights organization Amnesty International at New York City's Radio City Music Hall on 4 March 2012, it was one of the long-running series of similar Amnesty benefits.

Like its predecessors in 2006 and 2008, the show title was a reprise of the title of the 1979 Amnesty benefit show, The Secret Policeman's Ball, which heralded the organization's breakthrough in public awareness and fund-raising. To celebrate the fiftieth anniversary of Amnesty International, the show took place in the United States for the first time on March 4, 2012 at Radio City Music Hall in New York City, instead of its usual location in London.

== Content ==
The show was produced by James Serafinowicz and featured a mix of prominent comedians from Britain and the United States. After a taped introduction by Archbishop Desmond Tutu, the comedy lineup included:

- Jon Stewart
- Russell Brand
- Eddie Izzard
- Reggie Watts
- Ben Stiller
- Peter Serafinowicz
- Fred Armisen
- Kristen Wiig
- Seth Meyers
- Jason Sudeikis
- Bobby Moynihan
- Jay Pharoah
- Taran Killam
- Rachel Dratch
- Catherine Tate
- David Cross
- Bob Odenkirk
- Hannibal Buress
- Sarah Silverman
- Paul Rudd
- Matt Berry
- John Oliver
- Rashida Jones
- Chris O'Dowd
- David Walliams
- Jimmy Carr
- Noel Fielding
- Micky Flanagan
- Jack Whitehall
- Tim Roth
- Bill Hader (as Julian Assange)
- Rex Lee (as Kim Jong-un)
- John van der Put (as Piff the Magic Dragon)

There was a cameo appearance by Richard Branson, Liam Neeson introduced formerly imprisoned Burmese comedian and political activist Zarganar.

The musical lineup consisted of Mumford & Sons, Reggie Watts with Peter Serafinowicz, and a concluding set by Coldplay.

Additionally, Beavis and Butt-head appeared in an animated sequence and former Monty Python members Michael Palin, Eric Idle, and Terry Jones appeared in pre-recorded video segments explaining comedically why they were not there. At several moments in the show, Statler and Waldorf from the Muppets commented on the event and spoke to performers from a balcony.

Aziz Ansari, The Antics, Maya Rudolph and Stephen Colbert had been rumoured to appear but ultimately did not do so.

The event was streamed live on Epix. Peter Serafinowicz provided the voice of the announcer. It was later shown on Channel 4 in the UK on 9 March 2012, with extra behind the scenes interviews with some of the performers.

In the UK it was shown by Channel 4.
