= Springtime! =

Springtime! is a boutique entertainment company established in the UK in 1977 and based in the United States since 1983. The company's activities encompass film, TV, radio, record and stage show production, entertainment marketing & publicity and talent management. The company has produced and marketed audio recordings, films, TV specials and music videos. It is periodically active as a record company releasing its own audio productions and acquisitions.

== Record company ==
The record division of Springtime! was launched in 1981 as a label distributed in the UK by Island Records and in the US/Canada by Island/Warner Bros. Records.

The label is primarily focused on both newly recorded and historic comedy material. It has distributed recordings by the Portsmouth Sinfonia, alternative comedians such as Alexei Sayle, Rik Mayall, Ade Edmondson, Nigel Planer, Peter Richardson and French and Saunders of The Comic Strip, the historic Private Eye recordings. Springtime recorded and released Alexei Sayle's first album Cak! in 1982. 'The label's most successful humour release has been the comedy album of Amnesty International's, 1981 benefit show The Secret Policeman's Other Ball which featured John Cleese and Graham Chapman of Monty Python, Rowan Atkinson, Barry Humphries, Billy Connolly, Jasper Carrott, John Bird, John Fortune, Tim Brooke-Taylor, Griff Rhys Jones, Alexei Sayle and Neil Innes.

In addition to the release of the comedy album of Amnesty's 1981 show, the label also released the music album of that show which became a major chart success in the UK and the US. The album featured Sting, Eric Clapton, Jeff Beck, Phil Collins, Bob Geldof and Donovan.

The Comic Strip album achieved some attention owing to the strong language used by the performers, which prompted the label to place a parental advisory sticker on the front cover. It also attracted attention because of its long duration – with a total running time of over 69 minutes on a single 12" disc – considerably longer than the customary 40 minutes per album.

The label was dormant for several years and then in the early 1990s released a series of albums distributed in the UK by Castle Communications which included reissues of previous successes such as The Comic Strip Album and the first-ever releases of extended two-volume editions of two of Amnesty's comedy galas 1976's A Poke in the Eye and 1981's The Secret Policeman's Other Ball. In the USA, Springtime produced and distributed with Rhino Records a British comedy compilation titled Dead Parrot Society.

In the late 1990s, Springtime albums were distributed by Music Collection International and releases included three volumes of Private Eye recordings including the first-ever release of Private Eye's notorious album Ho-Ho Very Satirical! recorded in 1971 but refused release at the time by all major record companies because of its controversial content.

== Music videos ==
Springtime produced music videos for comedy records such as Alexei Sayle's Ullo John! Gotta New Motor? (1982), the Comic Strip's Pop-Up Toasters (1981) and the Portsmouth Sinfonia's Classical Muddly (1981). In 1984/1985 the company's Martin Lewis produced four music videos featuring Julian Lennon: Too Late For Goodbyes and Valotte (both directed by Sam Peckinpah); Jesse and Stand By Me. In 1985 Springtime co-produced the music video for Wham!'s Freedom single, co-directed by Lindsay Anderson and culled from footage of George Michael and Andrew Ridgeley shot by Anderson during the pop duo's April 1985 tour of China which was filmed by Springtime for George Michael and CBS Records.

The company has also produced or co-produced music videos related to movies. These included Eric Burdon's version of "Sixteen Tons" from the 1990 Tom Hanks/Meg Ryan film Joe Versus the Volcano, Bryan Ferry's "Kiss and Tell" from the 1988 Michael J. Fox film Bright Lights, Big City, The Pretenders' "If There Was a Man" from the 1987 James Bond film The Living Daylights, The Turtles "Happy Together" from the 1986 John Malkovich/Ann Magnuson comedy Making Mr. Right, a full-length version of Dooley Wilson's version of "As Time Goes By" for a reissue of Casablanca in 1998. In 2010, Springtime's Lewis produced the music video of Aaron Johnson performing one of the first songs recorded by John Lennon, Paul McCartney and George Harrison – "In Spite of All the Danger" – for the 2010 film Nowhere Boy.

== Films, TV and home-video ==
Springtime produced and released Alexei Sayle's first home-video show The Alexei Sayle Pirate Video in 1983.

Springtime produced or co-produced music documentaries such as Stand By Me: A Portrait Of Julian Lennon released in 1985 in the USA by MCA Home Video and in the UK by Virgin Vision and Foreign Skies: Wham! In China directed by Lindsay Anderson released worldwide in 1986 by CBS Records Video.

Springtime co-produced multiple theatrical, TV and home-video compilations for the US market drawn from Amnesty International's The Secret Policeman's Balls series of films. These include the 1982 US theatrical version of The Secret Policeman's Other Ball, the 1983 TV special The Secret Policeman's Private Parts, the 1984 special The Secret Policeman's Rock Concert, the 1985 special The Secret Policeman's Private Party, the 2009 DVD The Secret Policeman Rocks! and the 2010 DVD The Secret Policeman's Private Party (30th Anniversary Edition) – both released by Shout Factory.
