= A Poke in the Eye (With a Sharp Stick) =

UK comedy and charity fund-raising benefit and recording 1976

The cover of the 1992 CD reissue of the live album made from the A Poke in the Eye show. The cover is based on the original artwork created for the show in 1976.

A Poke in the Eye (With a Sharp Stick) is the title of the first show in what later became the Secret Policeman's Ball series of benefit shows for human rights organization Amnesty International, although it pre-dated by three years the first show to bear that name. The film of the show was titled Pleasure at Her Majesty's which is sometimes mistakenly thought to be the title of the actual benefit show.

== Background ==
The landmark 1976 show starring the Monty Python, Beyond the Fringe, and The Goodies teams and other top British comedic performers of the 1960s and 1970s, led directly to the 1979 show The Secret Policeman's Ball - which in turn triggered the involvement of major rock stars such as Sting, Bono, Peter Gabriel, Bruce Springsteen, and Bob Geldof in working for the human rights cause. It set a precedent that would inspire many subsequent Amnesty galas, as well as Comic Relief. The concept was also the inspiration of similar events in aid of Amnesty International in countries around the world.

The show took place on Thursday, April 1, 1976, Friday, April 2, 1976, and Saturday, April 3, 1976 as a series of late-night galas at Her Majesty's Theatre – a theatre in London's West End theatre district. The show was directed by Beyond the Fringe alumnus Jonathan Miller.

The event was audio-recorded and an album featuring highlights of the three nights was released in November 1976 by Transatlantic Records. The album had the same title as the show.

The event was also the subject of a film shot by documentary-maker Roger Graef that documented the rehearsals, backstage moments and show performances. The resulting film was titled Pleasure at Her Majesty's. It premiered in November 1976 at the 20th annual London Film Festival held at the National Film Theatre. The film was then screened on British television by the BBC in December 1976. Subsequently, the film received a modest theatrical release at arthouse cinemas in 1977.

Though the show included sequences featuring the Monty Python, Beyond the Fringe, and Goodies teams who were billed under their group names on the individual track listing of the resulting album — for the show itself, the album cover, and the cast listing on the film credits, the performers were listed under their individual names.

The cast included: John Cleese, Graham Chapman, Michael Palin, Terry Jones, and Terry Gilliam of Monty Python (with "Python girl" Carol Cleveland); Jonathan Miller, Peter Cook, and Alan Bennett of Beyond the Fringe; Bill Oddie, Graeme Garden, and Tim Brooke-Taylor of the Goodies. Solo performers included: John Fortune, John Bird, Eleanor Bron, Barry Humphries in character as Dame Edna Everage, Neil Innes, and mime artist Desmond Jones.

The show consisted primarily of "greatest hits" of the various performers. Peter Cook and Alan Bennett performed iconic solo routines from their early 1960s revue Beyond the Fringe. The Monty Python team performed several of their most famous skits including the Dead Parrot sketch, the Custard Pie (a.k.a. The Japes Lecture), and "The Lumberjack Song". The Goodies performed their hit single "The Funky Gibbon". Bird, Fortune, and Bron performed several of the routines they made famous in their appearances in the early 1960s at the satirical nightclub The Establishment.

The working title for the show was An Evening Without David Frost – a tongue-in-cheek allusion to the fact that David Frost was a common frame of reference for all the performers, most of whom had worked with him — or for him — early in their careers.

== Pleasure at Her Majesty's ==
Pleasure at Her Majesty's was the name given to the film release of A Poke in the Eye (With a Sharp Stick), the first of the Amnesty International comedy benefit galas. The show was performed at Her Majesty's Theatre, London (during the reign of Queen Elizabeth II), and the title is a play on both the location and the phrase "at Her Majesty's pleasure". In America, the film was originally called Monty Python Meets Beyond the Fringe.

The film consists of both on-stage and backstage footage, taken from all three nights of the run (1–3 April 1976). Co-founders of The Secret Policeman's Ball, campaigner Peter Luff, and executive Martin Lewis, collaborated on producing the successor show — videotaped in 1977 as The Mermaid Frolics. Then, Lewis and other co-founder John Cleese teamed up (with Amnesty's new fundraising director Peter Walker) in 1979 to create The Secret Policeman's Ball — the first show to carry what became the iconic Secret Policeman's Ball title.

=== Sequence of skits in the film ===
1. John Cleese, Michael Palin – Pet Shop
2. Alan Bennett – T. E. Lawrence
3. Barry Humphries as Dame Edna Everage – Spunk!
4. John Fortune, Eleanor Bron – Happy Darling
5. Peter Cook – Miner
6. Monty Python (guest appearance, Peter Cook) – Courtroom Sketch
7. John Fortune, John Bird – "You Say Potato"
8. Neil Innes – Protest Song
9. John Cleese, Jonathan Lynn – The Last Supper
10. The Goodies – "The Funky Gibbon"
11. Alan Bennett – Telegram
12. Desmond Jones – Hamlet (mime)
13. Peter Cook, John Fortune – Asp
14. Graham Chapman, Terry Gilliam, Terry Jones, Michael Palin, Carol Cleveland, Bill Oddie, John Cleese – The Japes Lecture
15. Eleanor Bron – Appeal
16. Beyond the Fringe (guest appearance, Terry Jones) – So That's the Way You Like It (Shakespeare sketch)
17. Monty Python and the entire cast – "The Lumberjack Song"

The above item titles do not appear anywhere in the film but are the titles ascribed to the skits and songs on the cast album released by Transatlantic Records in 1976.
