= Human rights concerts =

The Human Rights Concerts
- Benefit tour by Amnesty International
- Location: United States
Amnesty International benefit events chronology
| The Secret Policeman's Other Ball (1981) | A Conspiracy of Hope (1986) | Human Rights Now! (1988) |

The Human Rights Concerts is the collective name informally used to describe the series of 28 rock concerts presented worldwide 1986-1998 to raise funds for and awareness of the human rights organization Amnesty International.

The concert series – organized by the US Section of Amnesty – evolved out of the Secret Policeman’s Ball series of charity galas organized by the UK Section of Amnesty starting in 1976. The British benefit shows had initially been comedy events featuring comedic performers. But from 1979 onwards, the UK shows started to include cameo appearances by some of Britain's most prominent rock musicians - including Pete Townshend, Sting, Eric Clapton, Jeff Beck, Phil Collins, Bob Geldof, Donovan, Peter Gabriel, David Gilmour, Kate Bush and others. The Human Rights Concerts were developed with the intention of building on this new support for Amnesty among musicians and channelling it into a series of rock concerts and tours.

== Background ==
There were four distinctive sets of concerts in the series. The series featured many of the world’s leading contemporary musicians, including:

Bands: U2, The Police, Bruce Springsteen and the E Street Band, Radiohead, Led Zeppelin's Robert Plant and Jimmy Page, The Neville Brothers, The Hooters, New Kids On The Block, Third World

Solo Artists: Sting, Bruce Springsteen, Peter Gabriel, Jackson Browne, Lou Reed, Bryan Adams, Joan Baez, Wynton Marsalis, Sinéad O'Connor, Alanis Morissette, Shania Twain, Little Steven, Bob Geldof, Joan Armatrading, Carlos Santana, Yoko Ono, Miles Davis, Joni Mitchell, Tracy Chapman, Bono, Ruben Blades, Fela, Youssou N'Dour, k.d. lang, Pat Metheny

=== A Conspiracy of Hope ===
The A Conspiracy of Hope US tour spanned six concerts over a ten-day period in June 1986 and culminated in an eleven-hour concert at New Jersey's Giants Stadium that was aired as an all-day Live Aid style broadcast on MTV. Artists who played at all six concerts on the tour were: U2, Sting, Peter Gabriel, Bryan Adams, Lou Reed, Joan Baez and The Neville Brothers. On the first three concerts of the tour, Sting played as a solo artist accompanied by his own band. For the last three concerts of the tour, Sting performed as a member of The Police who reformed after a two-year hiatus especially for those three Amnesty concerts. (They were the last public performances by The Police for 21 years until their reunion in 2007.) At the grand finale of the tour in Giants Stadium, the touring artists were joined by an eclectic range of other musical performers including: Jackson Browne, Little Steven, Bob Geldof, Joan Armatrading, Carlos Santana, Yoko Ono, Miles Davis, Joni Mitchell, Ruben Blades, Fela, The Hooters and Third World. The Giants Stadium concert was aired once live on MTV, with a live presentation of the final three hours simulcast on the Fox Network. Neither the MTV live presentation nor the Fox Network special have ever been repeated on TV. Neither the Giants Stadium tour finale concert nor any of the preceding five concerts have ever been available in any home video or audio format.

=== Human Rights Now ===
The Human Rights Now! tour was a twenty concert World tour held over a six-week period in September–October 1988. The tour commemorated the 40th anniversary of the Universal Declaration of Human Rights that is the virtual manifesto of Amnesty's mission. The tour starred Bruce Springsteen & the E Street Band, Sting and Peter Gabriel with Tracy Chapman and Youssou N'Dour. Guest musicians who made appearances during the tour included Bono, Joan Baez, k.d. lang and Pat Metheny. The twenty concerts took place in fifteen countries on five continents (Europe, Asia, Africa, North America and South America). In each country the core artists were augmented at the concert with performances by popular local musicians. A three-hour film documenting the final concert in Buenos Aires together with highlights of the preceding world tour was aired once by HBO in the USA on December 10, 1988 - International Human Rights Day. A shortened version aired once on Channel Four in the UK. Neither the Buenos Aires tour finale concert nor any of the preceding nineteen concerts have ever been available in any home video or audio format.

=== An Embrace of Hope ===
The An Embrace Of Hope concert was a de facto post-script to the Human Rights Now! tour. It took place in Chile - a country that for political reasons it was not possible for the Human Rights Now! tour to visit during the 1988 world tour. Following the end of the Pinochet dictatorship in March 1990, the concert was staged in Santiago in October 1990 as a celebration of Chile's return to democracy. The concert starred Sting, Peter Gabriel, Inti-Illimani, Jackson Browne, Wynton Marsalis, Sinéad O'Connor, Ruben Blades, New Kids On The Block and several more South American and Spaniard artists. The concert was televised live in Chile and Spain but never shown in the USA.

=== The Struggle Continues... ===
The Struggle Continues... concert took place on December 10, 1998: the exact 50th anniversary of the signing of the Universal Declaration of Human Rights. It was presented in Paris, France - the city where the original Declaration had been signed in 1948. The concert starred Bruce Springsteen, Peter Gabriel, Radiohead, Robert Plant & Jimmy Page (of Led Zeppelin), Tracy Chapman, Alanis Morissette and Shania Twain. A three-hour film of the concert was aired once via pay-per-view in the USA in 1999. A live radio broadcast of the concert was transmitted by BBC Radio. The concert has never been available in any audio format, other than the four-hour broadcast in the U.S., including backstage interviews that was produced by Richard Flanzer of AtlanticPacific Music. Flanzer also distributed the concert footage and his company produced various portions of the event from Paris.

The concerts were all released on CD, iTunes and DVD (as a box set or individually) in 2013 by SHOUT! Factory.
