= Human Rights Now! =

1988 benefit concert tour

- Tour by Amnesty International
- Start date: 2 September 1988
- End date: 15 October 1988
- Legs: 6
- No. of shows: 20
Amnesty International benefit events chronology
A Conspiracy of Hope (1986)	Human Rights Now! (1988)	An Embrace of Hope (1990)
Bruce Springsteen tour chronology
Tunnel of Love Express Tour (1988)	Human Rights Now! (1988)	Bruce Springsteen 1992–1993 World Tour (1992–93)

Human Rights Now! was a worldwide tour of twenty benefit concerts on behalf of Amnesty International that took place over six weeks in 1988. Held not to raise funds but to increase awareness of both the Universal Declaration of Human Rights on its 40th anniversary and the work of Amnesty International, the shows featured Bruce Springsteen and the E Street Band, Sting, Peter Gabriel, Tracy Chapman, and Youssou N'Dour, plus guest artists from each of the countries where concerts were held.

Human rights activists and former prisoners from around the world, led by Sonny Venkatrathnam from South Africa, participated in the tour. At each location, the artists and Amnesty leaders held a press conference to discuss human rights, and concert-goers were provided with copies of the Universal Declaration in their language and opportunities to sign the Declaration themselves and join the worldwide human rights movement. The tour featured concerts at large sports stadiums such as Camp Nou in Barcelona (90,000 people), Népstadion in Budapest (80,000), JFK Stadium in Philadelphia (78,000), Estadio Monumental in Buenos Aires (75,000), and the National Sports Stadium in Harare, Zimbabwe (75,000). Only Paris and Toronto got arena shows. The Paris concert was originally going to be held at a large racing track that could accommodate 72,000 people, but the promoters changed their minds and it was moved indoors. More than one million people attended concerts over a six-week period, volunteers distributed 1.2 million copies of the Declaration, and hundreds of thousands of concertgoers signed a petition urging governments to ratify international human rights treaties and defend advocates for human rights.

The tour was made possible in part by a grant from the Reebok Foundation. The twenty concerts were the second stage of what subsequently became known collectively as the Human Rights Concerts – a series of music events and tours staged by the U.S. section of Amnesty International between 1986 and 1998.

== Background ==
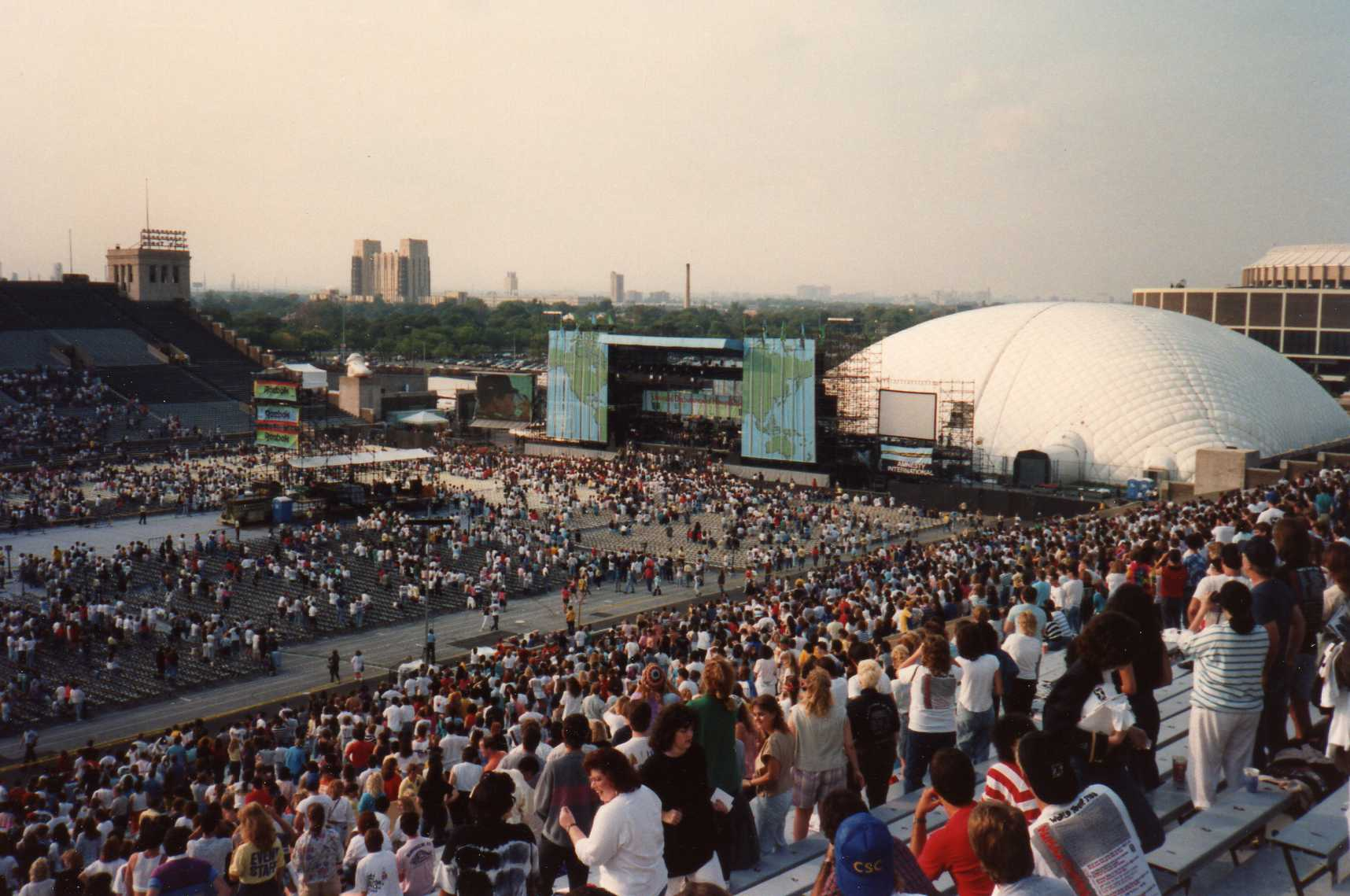
Opening stages of the 19 September show at Philadelphia's JFK Stadium.

Human Rights Now! Tour booklet.

The tour was originally conceived by the Executive Director of Amnesty International's U.S. section, Jack Healey, after a suggestion from former Executive Director David Hawk, with some limited input from producer Martin Lewis, who had first recruited rock musicians to perform for Amnesty years before for the Secret Policeman's Ball series of benefits. Healey developed the concept with famed rock promoter Bill Graham, who had worked with Healey on Amnesty's shorter, United States-only tour in 1986, titled A Conspiracy of Hope, and who acted as tour director. Healey served as executive producer, leading the team of three producers: Mary Daly, Jessica Neuwirth, and James Radner, father of George Radner. The media strategies for the tour, based on concepts originated by Healey and Lewis, were developed by Healey and Daly and executed by tour media director Magdeleno Rose-Avila and Charles Fulwood, Communications Director for Amnesty International USA.

== Tour dates ==
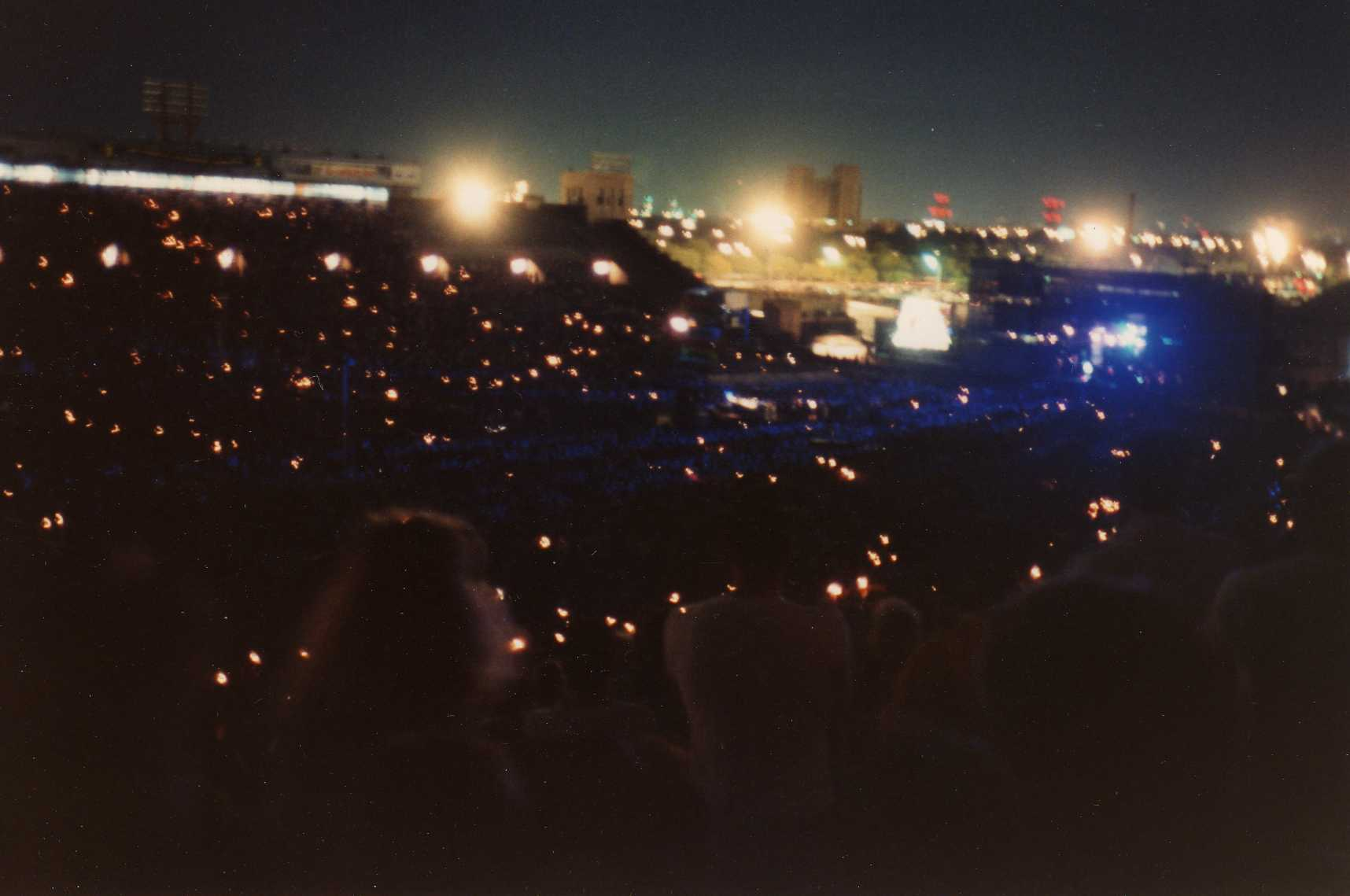
Lighters came out for songs such as Peter Gabriel's "Biko" that underscored the themes of the tour.

List of tour dates, showing date, city, country, venue, guest artists, attendance & revenue
Date	City	Country	Venue	Attendance	Revenue	Opening Act
Europe
2 September, 1988	London	England	Wembley Stadium			—N/a
4 September, 1988	Paris	France	Palais Omnisports de Paris-Bercy			Michel Jonasz
5 September, 1988	Paris	France	Palais Omnisports de Paris-Bercy			Michel Jonasz
6 September, 1988	Budapest	Hungary	Népstadion			Hobo Blues Band; János Bródy
8 September, 1988	Turin	Italy	Stadio Comunale			Claudio Baglioni
10 September, 1988	Barcelona	Spain	Camp Nou			El Último de la Fila
North America
13 September, 1988	San José	Costa Rica	Estadio Nacional			Guadalupe Urbina
15 September, 1988	Toronto	Canada	Maple Leaf Gardens			k.d. lang
17 September, 1988	Montreal	Canada	Olympic Stadium	58,679 / 60,199	$1,807,956	k.d. lang Michel Rivard; Daniel Lavoie
19 September, 1988	Philadelphia	United States	John F. Kennedy Stadium	75,892 / 75,892	$2,621,220	Joan Baez
21 September, 1988	Los Angeles	United States	Los Angeles Memorial Coliseum	56,547 / 64,000	$1,973,790	Joan Baez; Bono; The Edge
23 September, 1988	Oakland	United States	Oakland–Alameda County Coliseum	58.500 / 58,500	$1,462,500	Joan Baez; Roy Orbison
Asia
27 September, 1988	Tokyo	Japan	Tokyo Dome			Kodō
30 September, 1988	New Delhi	India	Jawaharlal Nehru Stadium			L. Shankar; Zakir Hussain
Europe
3 October, 1988	Athens	Greece	Olympic Stadium			George Dalaras
Africa
7 October, 1988	Harare	Zimbabwe	National Sports Stadium			Oliver Mtukudzi; Ilanga; Cde Chinx
9 October, 1988	Abidjan	Ivory Coast	Stade Félix Houphouët-Boigny			Ismaël Isaac; Johnny Clegg
South America
12 October, 1988	São Paulo	Brazil	Parque Antártica			Milton Nascimento; Pat Metheny
14 October, 1988	Mendoza	Argentina	Estadio Malvinas Argentinas			Los Prisioneros; Markama; Inti-Illimani
15 October, 1988	Buenos Aires	Argentina	Estadio Monumental			León Gieco; Charly García
