= The Secret Policeman's Ball 2008 =

The Secret Policeman's Ball 2008 was a show in the Secret Policeman's Ball series of benefit shows for Amnesty International.

In July 2008, Amnesty announced that it would present another show in its long-running series. Like its 2006 predecessor the show was a single-night live event at London's Royal Albert Hall, on Saturday 4 October 2008.

In common with other recent Amnesty benefit shows, the majority of the performers were British (or UK-based) and well-known primarily only in Great Britain, the one Canadian comedian Russell Peters appeared via a pre-recorded video-tape. Performers who were listed to perform were:

- Frank Skinner
- Alan Carr
- Graham Norton
- Sean Lock
- Kristen Schaal
- Fearne Cotton
- Matt Berry
- Katherine Parkinson
- Mitchell and Webb
- Jason Manford
- Shappi Khorsandi
- Russell Howard
- Russell Peters (via video-tape)
- Katy Brand
- Tim Minchin
- Sarah Millican
- Kayvan Novak
- Meera Syal
- Shaun Williamson
- Sharon Horgan
- Nick Mohammed
- Dan Clark
- David Armand
- Eddie Izzard
- Ed Byrne
- Deborah Meaden
- Jon Culshaw
- Gok Wan
- Michael Fenton Stevens
- Keane
- Razorlight

The 3-hour event was video-taped and a 95-minute television special adapted from the show was broadcast the following day, Sunday 5 October 2008, on Britain's Channel Four. There was also a "cinecast" in which the Royal Albert Hall event was shown live in 35 cinemas in major British cities. It was also available live in 4 cinemas in Australia. The "cinecast" was available in cinemas in six of Canada's thirteen provinces and territories. The Cineplex cinema chain made the film available on 50 of its 1,317 screens, however Amnesty and Cineplex did not announce the Canadian "cinecast" until Wednesday October 1, 2008, just three days before the screenings which did not allow time for the event to be effectively promoted in Canada.
