= The Secret Policeman's Ball (2006) =

Show organised by Eddie Izzard

The Secret Policeman's Ball (2006) DVD.

The Secret Policeman's Ball 2006 was a show staged as a benefit for human rights organization Amnesty International at London's Royal Albert Hall in October 2006. Its title was a conscious reprise of the title of the 1979 Amnesty benefit show that heralded the organization's breakthrough in public awareness and fundraising. The 1979 show The Secret Policeman's Ball, organised by John Cleese and producers Martin Lewis and Peter Walker, led to greater participation by comedians and rock musicians in further benefit shows for Amnesty and other social and political causes. It also led to the series of benefit shows that are informally known as The Secret Policeman's Balls.

The 2006 show was coordinated by British comedian Eddie Izzard. Internationally known performers Izzard and actor Richard E. Grant were joined by locally-popular comedic talents including Russell Brand, Jon Culshaw, Al Murray, The Mighty Boosh and Omid Djalili. American comedic actor Chevy Chase made a cameo appearance in one skit. Music was supplied by The Zutons and The Magic Numbers. Singer Natalie Imbruglia appeared in a routine alongside David Armand spoofing her hit song "Torn". The show also featured a series of computer-generated animations highlighting global political issues, including the American detention centre at Guantanamo Bay and the international arms trade.

Certain high-profile performers such as Jennifer Saunders and Ian McKellen previously advertised on Amnesty's website as confirmed participants did not appear in the show, but participated as voice actors in some of the animations shown throughout.

The 4-hour show was videotaped and 70 minutes of highlights were broadcast by Britain's Channel Four station on October 31, 2006. A DVD was released on 4 December with a duration of 199 minutes plus 83 minutes of extra material. Included in the 'extras' section were some of the animations from the show itself. There was also a series of "cinecasts" in which the Royal Albert Hall event was shown live in 17 cinemas in major British cities.

Several reviews in the UK media considered that, with a few exceptions, the performances and material were not of the highest calibre and did not compare to the quality of the original shows from the late 1970s and early 1980s. The critical comments were tempered by references to the fact that the event was held for a good cause; Chortle.co.uk wrote that "a charity gig is much like the infants’ Nativity play, successful in its own terms and not deserving of too much harsh scrutiny."

== List of performers ==
=== Solo comedic performers ===
- Al Murray
- Andrew Maxwell
- Dylan Moran
- Eddie Izzard
- Russell Brand
- Sarah Silverman
- Jon Culshaw

=== Performers in comedy skits ===
- Ronni Ancona
- David Armand
- Jo Brand
- Chevy Chase
- Omid Djalili
- Julia Davis
- Jimmy Fallon
- Nitin Ganatra
- Richard E Grant
- Seth Green
- Shobna Gulati
- Rhys Ifans
- Natalie Imbruglia
- Graham Norton
- Jessica Stevenson
- Shaun Williamson
- Kate Isitt

=== Comedy ensembles ===
- The Mighty Boosh (Julian Barratt and Noel Fielding)
- Cast of Green Wing (Tamsin Greig, Stephen Mangan, Julian Rhind-Tutt and Michelle Gomez)

=== Musical performers ===
- The Magic Numbers and Martha Wainwright
- The Zutons
- Natalie Imbruglia

=== Other participants ===
- Jeremy Irons (speaking about Amnesty)
