= The Secret Policeman's Ball =

Shows to benefit Amnesty International

- Status: Active
- Genre: Comedy fundraiser
- Locations: Jamaica; England (Essex); Brazil; Denmark
- Country: United Kingdom (1976–2019); United States (2012)
- Inaugurated: 1–3 April 1976
- Founder: John Cleese; Peter Luff
- Most recent: 4 March 2012
- Participants: Notable performers: Rowan Atkinson; Russell Brand; Hannibal Buress; Eric Clapton; John Cleese; Billy Connolly; Steve Coogan; Peter Cook; Duran Duran; Noel Fielding; Stephen Fry; Bob Geldof; Bill Hader; Eddie Izzard; Terry Jones; Hugh Laurie; Seth Meyers; David Mitchell; Dudley Moore; Michael Palin; Jennifer Saunders; Sarah Silverman; Ben Stiller; Sting; Pete Townshend; U2; John Williams; Kate Bush; Tom Robinson
- Organiser: Amnesty International
- Website: secretpoliceman.com

The Secret Policeman's Ball is a series of benefit shows staged initially in the United Kingdom to raise funds for the human rights organisation Amnesty International. The shows started in 1976 featuring popular British comedians but later included leading musicians and actors. The Secret Policeman's Ball shows are credited by many prominent entertainers with having galvanised them to become involved with Amnesty and other social and political causes in succeeding years.

Co-founded by Monty Python member John Cleese, campaigner Peter Luff (Assistant Director Amnesty International 1974–1978), and entertainment industry executive Martin Lewis, there have been four distinct eras of the Amnesty benefit shows. The shows of the first era (1976–1981), featuring five members of Monty Python and newcomers such as Rowan Atkinson, yielded films, television specials, home videos, and albums that have since been widely seen and heard internationally. The three subsequent eras (1987–1989, 1991–2001 and 2006 onwards) have primarily featured locally popular British performers – and spin-off products have been released mainly in the UK.

In March 2012, The Secret Policeman's Ball took place in the United States for the first time. The one-night show at New York's Radio City Music Hall on 4 March was part of Amnesty's 50th anniversary commemorations.

In January 2013, the website for The Secret Policeman's Ball was set to redirect to Amnesty International's; its registration has since expired. However, in 2019, the show was adapted as The Secret Policeman's Tour, performing at Hackney Empire in London, the Edinburgh Fringe Festival and Manchester Palace Theatre.

== Overview ==
"Amnesty first started doing these fund-raising shows in 1976. The instigation came from John Cleese who wanted to help out. And he did it in the only way he knew how. Which was to put on a show with what he described as 'a few friends'. Who of course transpired to be his colleagues in Monty Python and other luminaries of British comedy".

— Martin Lewis, co-founder of The Secret Policeman's Ball, on Cleese instigating the benefit show.

The series was created and developed by Monty Python member John Cleese, Peter Luff (Assistant Director Amnesty International 1974–1978) and entertainment industry executive Martin Lewis who subsequently worked with Peter Walker (Amnesty's Fund-Raising Officer from 1978). Cleese, Lewis and Luff worked together on the first two shows (1976 and 1977). After this, Cleese and Lewis worked on the next two shows (1979 and 1981) with Luff's replacement at Amnesty, Peter Walker – using the Secret Policeman's Ball title for the first time in 1979 and developing the series identity. Cleese credits Lewis with coining the Secret Policeman's Ball title. In an interview aired on BBC TV on 22 June 1979, Cleese told interviewer Michael Billington "It's Martin Lewis' title, I can pin that one on him. But I thought it was quite funny."

Although the Secret Policeman's Ball title was not used until the third show in 1979, the two preceding shows in 1976 and 1977 were retrospectively treated as part of the Secret Policeman's canon.

Cleese and Lewis subsequently worked individually on other Amnesty projects. Cleese made brief cameo appearances in the 1987 and 1989 shows and co-directed the latter. Lewis produced two American films drawn from the first four shows (released in the US in 1982 and 1983) and then helped expand the participation of rock musicians for Amnesty (that he first engendered in the 1979 and 1981 shows) with his contributions to the 1986 Conspiracy of Hope US tour and the 1988 Human Rights Now! world tour.

The first wave of shows took place approximately every other year, and three of the first four shows were filmed and released theatrically as movies with corresponding record albums. Because multi-artist benefit shows with contemporary performers were a new phenomenon in Britain in the mid-1970s and early 1980s, they were accorded considerable media coverage and public attention.

After 1981, there was a six-year hiatus. When Amnesty International re-commenced staging benefit shows, it did so without the benefit of the Amnesty staff members and outside producers who had successfully guided the first wave of shows. The new team running Amnesty International re-commenced staging benefit shows in 1987, and the shows were on a noticeably smaller scale and consequently generated less media attention. The shows from 1987 onwards were videotaped to be shown as TV specials and/or released on home video in Britain rather than filmed as movies with prospects for international release. The sole exception to the smaller scale events was an ill-fated attempt in June 1988 to stage a weekend concert event titled "Amnesty International Festival of Youth" at the 65,000 capacity Milton Keynes Bowl. The event was a massive failure and for the first time ever, one of Amnesty's fund-raising benefit events lost money.

Only two more of Amnesty's benefit shows (in 1987 and 1989) carried a Secret Policeman's Ball-related title. Between 1991 and 2001 Amnesty staged four more benefit events and though they were comedy shows in the same vein as their predecessors, none of them carried the Secret Policeman's Ball title. When Amnesty staged a 40th anniversary show in 2001 it was stated that the Secret Policeman's Ball title had run its course and would not be revived.

However, in October 2006, following a 17-year gap, the name was revived, and also used for shows in October 2008 and March 2012.

=== Lasting impact ===
The first four shows (1976–1981) and their spin-offs are credited by many prominent comedians, musicians, actors and producers with having galvanised them to become involved with Amnesty and other social and political causes in succeeding years.

Rock stars Bob Geldof, Bono and Sting have all attributed their involvement in humanitarian issues to their exposure to the Secret Policeman's Ball shows: Geldof, Sting and Clapton as participants with Bono as an audience member.

Bono told Rolling Stone magazine in 1986: "I saw 'The Secret Policeman's Ball' and it became a part of me. It sowed a seed..." In 2001, Bono described The Secret Policeman's Ball to an Amnesty audience as "a mysterious and extraordinary event that certainly changed my life..." In 1986, Sting told NBC's Today "I've been a member of Amnesty and a support member for five years, due to an entertainment event called 'The Secret Policeman's Ball' and before that I did not know about Amnesty, I did not know about its work, I did not know about torture in the world." Bob Geldof and Ultravox singer Midge Ure first met and worked together at 1981's The Secret Policeman's Other Ball which was the first benefit show that either of them had performed at. Geldof credits the Secret Policeman's Ball series with having inspired his own charity show endeavours.

The earliest shows predated the proliferation of comedy and rock benefit shows that took place in the UK and US in the mid-1980s such as Live Aid, Farm Aid, Prince's Trust concerts, The Free Nelson Mandela Concert and Comic Relief. The Amnesty shows are considered to have been the pioneering charity events that helped inspire the later shows.

Amnesty directly attributes the leaps in awareness of the human rights issue, the significant increases in its membership (especially among the young) and its dramatically increased fundraising achievements to the impact of the various shows, their spin-offs and successor Amnesty events such as the Conspiracy of Hope and Human Rights Now! tours.

Some of the films received international cinema release, and the soundtrack albums enjoyed commercial success worldwide, all of which generated considerable international awareness of the original shows, together with a growing grassroots awareness of Amnesty International and the human rights issue. Amnesty states that public awareness of Amnesty increased by 700% between the first and third shows. Membership of the organisation increased sharply.

=== Introduction to an American audience ===
The films and records of the first three Amnesty benefit shows did not initially receive much exposure in the US, but this started to change in 1981–1982.

The original British versions of the two Secret Policeman's Ball movies were presented at the 1981 and 1982 Filmex Los Angeles International Film Festival. Media coverage of the screenings in magazines such as Rolling Stone created awareness of the benefit shows.

The album The Secret Policeman's Other Ball – The Music was released by Island Records/Warner Bros. Records in March 1982 and became a Top Thirty album in the Billboard charts.

The third major element in bringing the Secret Policeman's Balls to the U.S. was the acquisition of the UK films by American distributors Harvey Weinstein and Bob Weinstein, founders of the independent distribution company Miramax Films. They had acquired the US rights to the film of the 1979 show The Secret Policeman's Ball and subsequently its successor The Secret Policeman's Other Ball. They determined that neither film would be successful in the American marketplace because some of the content was too parochial for American tastes. With Amnesty's blessing, they decided to combine the two films for the US.

Original producer Martin Lewis distilled the best performances from both films into one new 110-minute film for the American market, with an opening sequence narrated by Saturday Night Live announcer Don Pardo. The new film premiered in New York in May 1982 as a fund-raiser for the U.S. section of Amnesty; it received enthusiastic reviews and went on to box office success. The film is recognised as Miramax's first hit. The American version of the film was released on home video by MGM-UA later in 1982. The US film (though drawn from the UK films of both the 1979 and 1981 shows) used as its title The Secret Policeman's Other Ball – a title that by May 1982 had some resonance in the US marketplace because of the success of the music soundtrack album and media coverage of the film festival screenings.

In 1983, the Weinsteins and Lewis produced an 80-minute sequel TV special for HBO/Cinemax later released on home video by Media Home Entertainment titled The Secret Policeman's Private Parts. The program compiled material from the first two Amnesty shows (the 1976 and 1977 benefits) and the best of the content from the original 1979 and 1981 films that had not been used in the 1982 US version of The Secret Policeman's Other Ball.

=== American offshoots (1986 and 1988) ===
In the early 1980s, Amnesty had a low profile in the US, and its Executive Director Jack Healey was looking for a way to raise the organisation's profile, especially among young people. In a 1986 profile in Rolling Stone Healey related how he decided to find out if the goodwill towards Amnesty of rock musicians that he had seen in the US version of The Secret Policeman's Other Ball could be put to service to help improve Amnesty's profile in America.

Consulting with Martin Lewis, Healey conceived and produced Conspiracy of Hope, a 10-day/6-concert rock tour of the US that took place in June 1986 in celebration of Amnesty's 25th anniversary. The tour was headlined by a mixture of British and Irish artists – Sting, The Police, Peter Gabriel and U2 – with American and Canadian musicians Jackson Browne, Lou Reed, Joan Baez, The Neville Brothers and Bryan Adams. The tour was promoted by rock impresario Bill Graham. The tour concluded with a major all-day concert at Giants Stadium in New Jersey that was televised live by MTV. The final concert featured additional artists including Bob Geldof, Joan Armatrading, Rubén Blades, Carlos Santana, Howard Jones, Miles Davis and Joni Mitchell. Just one month after the tour, the membership of Amnesty in the USA had increased by 45,000 members.

Subsequent to the A Conspiracy of Hope tour, Lewis and Healey conceived the 1988 Amnesty world tour Human Rights Now!, that featured Bruce Springsteen, Sting, Peter Gabriel, Youssou N'Dour and Tracy Chapman. Lewis and Healey's intention was to commemorate the 40th anniversary of the Universal Declaration of Human Rights by staging a tour that would visit all five continents. The aim was to raise consciousness of human rights issues rather than fund-raising.

The six-week/20-concert tour was produced by Healey and Bill Graham. The tour staged concerts in 19 different nations in all five continents – and was considered successful in raising considerable awareness of the human rights issue throughout the world.

The two tours were the cornerstone of what subsequently became known collectively as the Human Rights Concerts – a series of music events and tours staged by the US Section of Amnesty International between 1986 and 1998.

== First four shows 1976–1981 ==
=== 1976 – A Poke in the Eye ===
In early 1976, the British section of Amnesty International was seeking a way to simultaneously raise funds for itself and elevate the very low profile of human rights issues in British public discourse. It decided to commemorate the 15th anniversary of the Amnesty parent organisation with a simple one-night benefit show with a few entertainers contributing services as was the norm with charity events in that era. There was no anticipation that the event might be filmed or recorded to be shared with an audience beyond the people attending the benefit, and no anticipation that it might be anything other than a one-off event.

Amnesty's Assistant Director Peter Luff approached John Cleese of the Monty Python comedy troupe to seek his participation. Cleese was taken with the idea and volunteered to assist the event by helping to "round up a few friends".

Cleese's "few friends" turned out to be colleagues in Monty Python, pals in the earlier British comedic ensemble Beyond The Fringe, his Footlights and I'm Sorry, I'll Read That Again peers (including The Goodies), and other members of the British comedy community from the 1960s and 1970s (primarily those described as "Oxbridge" comedians).

Luff, working with his Amnesty colleague David Simpson, obtained the use of Her Majesty's Theatre, free of charge. The tickets for the show were advertised solely in the satirical magazine Private Eye and were sold out within four days.

The other member of the production team was Martin Lewis, a young record industry executive who initially undertook to produce a record album of the show and then became closely involved with Cleese, Luff and Simpson on the show production – which evolved into a three-night run. TV documentary maker Roger Graef, approached the team offering to make a "fly-on-the-wall"-style documentary about the production of the show and to film the show itself. The resulting film was titled Pleasure at Her Majesty's. Lewis also undertook responsibility for publicising the show and its film and record spin-offs.

==== Show ====
The show – titled by Cleese A Poke in the Eye (With a Sharp Stick) – took place on 1–3 April 1976 as a series of late-night galas at Her Majesty's Theatre in London's West End theatre district. The show was directed by Beyond The Fringe alumnus Jonathan Miller. The shows started at 11.30 pm, after the performance of the theatre's regularly scheduled play. Being late-night events became a hallmark of subsequent shows.

In addition to Lewis' audio recording team, Roger Graef, used a small 16 mm crew, to film rehearsals and performances. The footage was later assembled into the film Pleasure at Her Majesty's, which premiered in November 1976 at the 20th annual London Film Festival, and was broadcast by the BBC in December 1976. Subsequently, the film received a modest theatrical release at art-house cinemas in 1977. A record album of the show, titled A Poke in the Eye (With a Sharp Stick), was released in November 1976 by Transatlantic Records and was a commercial success.

The original working title for the show had been An Evening Without David Frost – an allusion to the fact that most of the performers had worked with, or for, David Frost early in their careers.

=== 1977 – The Mermaid Frolics ===
In May 1977 a second Amnesty benefit was held to build on the success of the first show and with the intent of developing momentum for a regularly scheduled benefit show. The returning production team included Amnesty Assistant Director Peter Luff and Martin Lewis. The show was directed by Monty Python member Terry Jones. This show was unlike the first show and its primary successors in three key aspects. It was a single-night event rather than consisting of multiple performances, it started at 8:00 pm on a Sunday evening, and the show was videotaped as a TV special rather than filmed for theatrical release.

The show took place at London's Mermaid Theatre and was titled An Evening Without Sir Bernard Miles, an affectionate reference to the actor/manager who had founded the Mermaid Theatre. The title grew out of the discarded working title of the previous year's show.

The comedic performers in the 1977 show included several who had performed in the first show – such as Peter Cook, Terry Jones, John Cleese – joined by his then wife Connie Booth – and some newcomers including Sir Peter Ustinov. There were also a handful of musical performers including classical guitarist John Williams, actress/singer Julie Covington and folk troubadour Pete Atkin.

The album of the show and the TV show were given a fresh title by producer Lewis: The Mermaid Frolics. The album was released on Polydor Records in December 1977 and the TV special was shown on the ITV network that same month through Granada TV. The title of the TV show and record album has since become the name by which the original stage show itself is referred to.

=== 1979 – The Secret Policeman's Ball ===
Amnesty decided not to present a benefit show in 1978, in order to consider how to make better use of the performing talent so favourably disposed to assist it in raising funds. Peter Luff left Amnesty in 1978 and the organisation's new fund-raising officer, Peter Walker, was deputed to work with Lewis on reconfiguring the show to raise more money and greater awareness of Amnesty.

Lewis and Walker determined that the third show needed to be produced in the same vein as the first show (i.e. multiple performances, late-night and filmed for theatrical release) but with a more professional approach to exploiting the film. They approached John Cleese who agreed to be involved again. He also agreed to direct the show, though requesting that his credit read "slightly directed by John Cleese." He also recruited the majority of the comedic performers – including Peter Cook and fellow Pythons Michael Palin and Terry Jones. He also selected a newcomer on the British comedy scene named Rowan Atkinson. Lewis recruited Scottish comedian Billy Connolly with whom he had worked while employed at Transatlantic Records. Connolly was the first non-Oxbridge comedian to perform at an Amnesty benefit – a distinction he made fun of at the show.

Lewis proposed to Cleese that in addition to the comedy performances the show should feature some contemporary rock musicians. Cleese delegated this responsibility to Lewis who recruited Who guitarist Pete Townshend to perform, as well as new wave singer-songwriter Tom Robinson.

Cleese and Palin promoted the forthcoming show in an interview conducted by Michael Billington, transmitted on BBC television on 22 June 1979. Cleese and Palin explained their support for Amnesty and their reasons for doing the shows.

The shows took place over four consecutive nights at Her Majesty's Theatre in London on 27–30 June 1979.

The shows were again filmed by a rudimentary 16 mm documentary crew and the resulting 100-minute film – also titled The Secret Policeman's Ball was released theatrically by ITC in June 1980 heralded by a special preview attended by many of the show's participants. (A one-hour television special drawn from the performances aired on Britain's ITV network by London Weekend Television in December 1979, to coincide with the release of The Secret Policeman's Ball record album on Island Records, produced by Lewis, of the comedy performances.)

A second record was released to coincide with the release of the film, a 12-inch EP containing eight musical performances from the show including three Townshend songs.

Peter Cook's nine-minute parody of the summing up of Mr Justice Cantley in the Thorpe Trial, "Entirely A Matter for You," was so successful that the audio recording of the live performance was released as an album on Virgin Records entitled Here Comes the Judge: Live.

The film and record albums enjoyed critical and commercial success in the UK and sparked international interest. The film was released in several countries with notable success in Australia. For the first time there was also interest in the US with the EP of the musical performances being released as an album by Atco/Atlantic Records and the US movie rights being acquired by fledgling independent distributor Miramax Films.

The iconic Secret Policeman's cartoon character used to promote the show, film and record albums made its first appearance in 1979. It was created by New Statesman cartoonist Colin Wheeler who had been commissioned by Peter Walker.

This film, plus four others, is included on the Secret Policeman's Balls DVD.

=== 1981 – The Secret Policeman's Other Ball ===
Following the success of the 1979 show and the financial benefits accruing to Amnesty from the spin-off movie, TV special and record albums – Cleese, Lewis and Walker planned the next show to be a more spectacular event.

Cleese focused on broadening the comedic talent to be presented at the show. In addition to the Amnesty show stalwarts drawn from the Oxbridge/Monty Python/Beyond The Fringe orbit, he invited newcomers such as Rowan Atkinson's colleagues from the BBC TV show Not the Nine O'Clock News including Pamela Stephenson and Griff Rhys Jones; comedian Victoria Wood and regional comic Jasper Carrott. Lewis secured a return appearance by Billy Connolly and a debut appearance by "alternative" comedian Alexei Sayle whom Lewis had recently discovered and was managing.

Building on the success of Pete Townshend's 1979 appearance Lewis recruited other rock musicians to perform at the 1981 show including Sting, Phil Collins, Eric Clapton, Jeff Beck, Donovan and Bob Geldof.

The show was presented at the Theatre Royal Drury Lane on four consecutive nights on 9–12 September 1981.

Cleese invited theatre director Ron Eyre to co-direct the show with him. Walker secured funds to have the show filmed (at Lewis' suggestion) by new wave filmmaker Julien Temple. For the first time an Amnesty show was filmed with a full 35 mm film crew. The resulting film was released in the UK by UIP in March 1982. It became a commercial success on both its theatrical release and its subsequent home video release. The film was also released in theaters in the United States.

Two record albums were also released by Springtime/Island Records. One featured highlights of the comedy material, while the other featured the musical performances. In addition to the movies and albums, Methuen published a large coffee-table book edited by Lewis and Walker, featuring transcripts of the sketches from the show, photographs and some specially written comedic notes by Michael Palin and Terry Jones.

=== Distinctive elements of early shows ===
The reputation of the original four shows has endured and grown over the years. In September 2006, 30 years after the first show, a profile in the respected British newspaper The Daily Telegraph referred to the "talismanic power of the words The Secret Policeman's Ball" and "the show's folkloric status".

There are many factors that contributed to the reputation of the shows, particularly those of the 'first wave':

- The galas were the first stage shows in the UK to feature a broad cross-section of the baby boomer generation of contemporary comedic performers who came of age in the 1960s and 1970s. Media reviews at the time described the 1976 show as a gathering of the tribes.
- They were the first stage shows in the UK to present comedic performers (such as Monty Python and Rowan Atkinson) in the same setting and shows as their contemporaries in rock music.
- Solo live performances by rock musicians of their hits was not a familiar phenomenon prior to the Secret Policeman's shows. This changed with Townshend's performance of "Pinball Wizard", Sting singing "Message in a Bottle" and "Roxanne", Phil Collins performing "In The Air Tonight".
- The shows presented unusual permutations of performers, in the 1976 show, Peter Cook of Beyond The Fringe became an honorary member of Monty Python for their Courtroom Sketch. Terry Jones of Monty Python took the place of the absent Dudley Moore in Beyond The Fringe's Shakespeare skit. In a later show, Rowan Atkinson was a guest performer with three members of Monty Python for the Four Yorkshiremen sketch. John Cleese had the opportunity to perform in "two-handers" (skits for just two performers) with two of his mentors: Jonathan Miller in 1977 and Peter Cook in 1979. In 1981, it was Cleese's turn to fulfil the role of mentor in a two-hander with Rowan Atkinson.
- The out-of-the-ordinary pairings extended to musical performers. In the 1979 show, producer Martin Lewis arranged for rock guitarist Pete Townshend to duet with classical guitar virtuoso John Williams on The Who's "Won't Get Fooled Again". Lewis also arranged for new-wave rock performers Sting and Bob Geldof to perform in a specially assembled super-group (named "The Secret Police") with 1960s guitar icons Eric Clapton and Jeff Beck on a grand finale performance of Bob Dylan's "I Shall Be Released".
- Much of the material performed in the much heralded first four shows (1976–1981) came from the repertoire of sketches and skits created in the preceding 15 years by Beyond The Fringe alumni, and by Monty Python and its radio and TV antecedents, this radio or TV material was presented on stage. For example: several skits from the cult 1960s TV show At Last the 1948 Show were resuscitated by John Cleese (one of that show's creators) and performed by him with cast members, including fellow Pythons (Michael Palin, Terry Jones, Graham Chapman) and other peers (John Bird, John Fortune and Tim Brooke-Taylor (the last also an At Last the 1948 Show writer and performer), along with younger performers (Rowan Atkinson, Griff Rhys Jones), and Cleese's then wife, actress/writer Connie Booth.
- The shows were also the first to present a new wave of comedians to a wider audience, such as Billy Connolly and Alexei Sayle. By the time of the second and third waves of Secret Policeman's shows (in 1987–1989 and 1991–2001, respectively), "alternative comedians" had become the new mainstream, succeeding the Oxbridge comedy school of the 1960s and 1970s. The later Amnesty shows followed the lead of the earlier shows in presenting the most popular comedy performers of the era, such as Ben Elton, French & Saunders, and Eddie Izzard.

=== Aftermath ===
Following the success of The Secret Policeman's Ball shows, there was a substantial increase in the number of benefit shows and charity projects in the UK in the early to mid-1980s – for a wide variety of causes. Many of the shows were modelled on the format of the Secret Policeman's Ball shows. At a certain point the media started to refer to a phenomenon described as "benefit fatigue" a term coined to describe the attitude towards the glut of benefit shows – many featuring the same group of performers – that were taking place each year.

By 1982, Amnesty had lost the services of two key staff members, Peter Luff and Peter Walker, who had guided the first 4 benefit shows.

The British Section of Amnesty responded to these two factors by taking a break from staging new benefit shows for six years. When it restarted the Secret Policeman's series in 1987 it scaled back from producing theatrical movies of its shows to making them into TV and home video specials.

== 1987–2001 shows ==
=== 1987 – The Secret Policeman's Third Ball ===
When the British Amnesty shows finally resumed in 1987 after a six-year hiatus, the show format was retooled in an effort to take advantage of the growing number of rock musicians supporting Amnesty. Instead of the live show being primarily a comedy show with a few musical cameos, the event made a point of giving equal emphasis to comedy and music. The show's four nights were divided up into two nights of comedy and two nights of music.

The line-up of musicians included several who were already veterans of earlier Amnesty benefits in the UK and/or USA: Bob Geldof, Peter Gabriel, Jackson Browne and Lou Reed. Other performers included Kate Bush, David Gilmour, Mark Knopfler, Joan Armatrading, Chet Atkins, World Party and Duran Duran.

Most of the comedic performers in the 1987 show were talents familiar primarily just to British audiences. This made the film of the show far less appealing to overseas audiences and unlike its predecessors it did not find major international distribution in lucrative markets such as the US and Canada.

Comedic performers included: Stephen Fry & Hugh Laurie, Mel Smith & Griff Rhys Jones, Dawn French & Jennifer Saunders, Ruby Wax, Hale and Pace, Lenny Henry, Rory Bremner, Robbie Coltrane, Ben Elton and the Spitting Image puppets.

The shows took place at The London Palladium over four consecutive nights 26–29 March 1987. The shows were videotaped and a home video special was created integrating performances from the two comedy nights and two music nights. It was released by Virgin Vision. Two TV specials were created and transmitted – one featuring musical performances, the other featuring comedy performances. Following the pattern established by the 1979 and 1981 shows, separate albums of the comedic and musical performances was released by Virgin Records. The shows were produced by Tony Hollingsworth, and the videos were produced by Hollingsworth and Neville Bolt.

The 92-minute TV and video specials were subsequently criticised for the increased musical content. While all the musical performances were presented in full, the comedic performances were often edited heavily. The TV version also prominently featured spoof documentary segments by newcomer Ruby Wax, which took time from the performances of the comedians and musicians. This reflected the fact that, unlike the previous shows (which had been stage events that integrated comedy and music) the performances were edited together from two entirely different types of stage show.

=== 1988 – Amnesty International Festival of Youth ===
In 1986, the US Section of Amnesty International had organised the very successful Conspiracy of Hope tour featuring leading rock musicians on an 11-day/6-concert tour of the US. This tour built upon the participation of rock musicians in the 1979 and 1981 Secret Policeman's shows. In early 1988, the US Section of Amnesty announced plans for a world tour featuring major musicians to take place later that year. Titled Human Rights Now! the tour would commemorate the 40th anniversary of the Universal Declaration of Human Rights. The primary artists who had signed on to perform were Bruce Springsteen, Sting, Peter Gabriel, Youssou N'Dour and Tracy Chapman. It was also announced that the world tour would commence with a gigantic kick-off concert in England – a salute to the fact that Amnesty had been founded in UK. The choice of England for the first concert was also in acknowledgement of the English Secret Policeman's Ball shows that had pioneered the deployment of rock musicians for Amnesty's benefit, and the presence in the line-up of two prominent English musicians, Sting and Peter Gabriel.

Shortly after the announcement of the forthcoming concert in England, the British Section of Amnesty International announced that it too had decided to salute the 40th anniversary of the Universal Declaration of Human Rights with a rock concert in England. The British Section of Amnesty scheduled its own concert to take place less than ten weeks prior to the announced date of the Human Rights Now! English concert already organised by their American sister organisation.

Amnesty's British Section then booked one of Britain's largest concert venues, the 65,000 capacity Milton Keynes Bowl and at very short notice staged a weekend-long extravaganza titled Amnesty International Festival of Youth. Fatally for the event, Amnesty's in-house producer Pat Duffy scheduled the event to follow just one week after the long-announced Nelson Mandela 70th Birthday Tribute at England's 82,000 capacity Wembley Stadium. The Nelson Mandela concert had already lined up appearances by many of Amnesty's most prominent supporters in the music community – including Sting, Peter Gabriel, Eric Clapton, Phil Collins, Bryan Adams, Jackson Browne, Steven van Zandt, Midge Ure, Simple Minds, Youssou N’Dour, Joan Armatrading – all of whom declined to partake in the new Amnesty show taking place just one week later. This made it virtually impossible for the comparatively last-minute Amnesty event, with less celebrated performers, organised by people without much previous experience, to succeed. Amnesty resisted recommendations to postpone or cancel the event and proceeded with the weekend.

Amnesty's Festival of Youth weekend featured: Aswad, Joe Strummer, Big Country, The Stranglers, Aztec Camera, Motörhead, The Bhundu Boys, Go West, The Damned, Spear of Destiny, Martin Stephenson and the Daintees, New Model Army, The Icicle Works, Rhythm Sisters, The Men They Couldn't Hang, Transvision Vamp, So, World Domination Enterprises, Runrig.

It was positioned chronologically between the two previously announced major benefit concerts that summer in the UK – the Nelson Mandela 70th Birthday Concert and Amnesty's own Human Rights Now! concert, both of which featured far more stellar line-ups. Thus the Festival of Youth was a major financial disaster for Amnesty. Uniquely among all the Amnesty benefit shows, Amnesty failed to find a film studio, television network, radio broadcaster, home-video distributor or record company to partner with it on the event and this compounded the substantial financial losses sustained by Amnesty.

=== 1989 – The Secret Policeman's Biggest Ball ===
After the criticisms of the 1987 production's disproportionate focus on music – and the financial disaster of its music-only Festival of Youth weekend concert in 1988 – Amnesty returned to the original formula that had been so successful in the 1976–81 era with a primary focus on comedy. Pat Duffy was dropped from organising any further benefit events for Amnesty and for the 1989 show, Amnesty hired producer Judith Holder.

John Cleese and Michael Palin made brief cameo appearances, establishing a connection to the original shows. Also returning was Peter Cook – on this occasion performing with his longtime comedic partner, Dudley Moore – and satirist John Bird. Several performers from the 1987 show returned including: Adrian Edmondson, Stephen Fry & Hugh Laurie, Dawn French & Jennifer Saunders, Lenny Henry, Rory Bremner, Ben Elton, Robbie Coltrane, Willie Rushton and the Spitting Image puppets.

Performances took place at the Cambridge Theatre between 30 August and 2 September. The show was directed by Jennifer Saunders and John Cleese, and a videotape was televised in October 1989.

=== 1991 – Barf Bites Back and Big 30 ===
In early 1991, Amnesty held a comedy gala at the Duke of York's Theatre in London to commemorate its 30th anniversary. The event was the first Amnesty comedy show since 1979 which did not use the Secret Policeman's title. The performers were primarily alternative comedians including: Tony Slattery, Lee Evans, Simon Fanshawe, Martin Soan, Eddie Izzard and Richard Vranch. The show was videotaped and televised by Granada TV in August 1991.

At the end of 1991, a second event commemorating Amnesty's 30th anniversary was organised as a TV special. The cast included Ben Elton, Lenny Henry, Steve Coogan, Julian Clary, Frank Skinner, Paul Merton, Vic Reeves and comedic music from Spinal Tap. The show's musical directors were David Gilmour of Pink Floyd and Jools Holland. Musical guests included Dave Stewart, Seal, Tom Jones, Morrissey, EMF, Jason Donovan, Kim Wilde, Rick Astley, Daryl Hall and Lisa Stansfield. The show was hosted by Jonathan Ross and Alexei Sayle.

Unlike Amnesty's previous shows, these shows took place in a television studio. The performers were videotaped at Central Independent Television Studios, Nottingham, on 13 and 15 December 1991 and the resulting TV show was televised later that month.

=== 1997 & '98 – So You Think You're Irish and So You Think You're Irish 2 ===
In early 1997, Amnesty held a comedy gala at the Gaiety Theatre in Dublin. The performers were primarily Irish performers including: Barry Murphy, Brendan O'Carroll, Pauline McLynn, Dermot Morgan, Kevin McAleer, Owen O'Neill, and Kevin Gildea. The show was videotaped and televised on ITV in March 1997.

In 1998, Amnesty staged a reprise of "So You Think You're Irish" in Dublin. The performers were again primarily Irish performers including: Milo O'Shea, Barry Murphy, Pauline McLynn, Dylan Moran, Dara Ó Briain, Tommy Tiernan, Ed Byrne, Kevin McAleer, Owen O'Neill, Ian Coppinger, Eddie Bannon, Brendan Dempsey and Kevin Gildea. The show was videotaped and televised on ITV in August 1998.

=== 2001 – We Know Where You Live ===
In June 2001, Amnesty staged a benefit show that was video-taped as a TV special to commemorate its 40th anniversary.

Titled We Know Where You Live the show was a one-night performance at the Wembley Arena. The show was coordinated by comedian Eddie Izzard. The majority of the performers were British comedians popular in their homeland but not well known internationally. Performers included Izzard, Harry Enfield, Paul Whitehouse, Vic Reeves, Sean Lock, Harry Hill, Jeremy Hardy, Phill Jupitus, Richard Blackwood, Dom Joly, Simon Day and Jonathan Ross – with cameo appearances by actors Alan Rickman, Colin Firth, Richard E. Grant, Tim Roth, Emma Thompson, and Julie Walters.

In a salute to the original Secret Policeman's Ball, the finale of the show was a re-creation by Alan Rickman, Vic Reeves, Eddie Izzard and Harry Enfield of the Four Yorkshiremen sketch that had been performed at the 1979 Amnesty show by John Cleese, Michael Palin, Terry Jones and Rowan Atkinson.

Coordinator Eddie Izzard also acknowledged the show's heritage in an interview in London's Evening Standard (31 May 2001) saying: "The musical elements will follow the previous format because it's the son of Secret Policeman's Ball – so they're more acoustic than electric..."

Explaining the show's new title, Izzard told the Evening Standard: "The title is designed to streamline the message of Secret Policeman's Ball, which was a bit more ambiguous. We Know Where You Live is about gangsters or governments who run countries and withhold human rights."

The audience saw a musical performance on a giant video screen by U2 via satellite. Also acknowledging the heritage of the show, Bono introduced U2's performance by saying: "Right, what we'd like to do now is go live from Toronto to London, to The Secret Policeman's Ball – which is a mysterious and extraordinary event that certainly changed my life..." (Notwithstanding the description of the show as "live" the U2 performance had actually been pre-recorded in Toronto two weeks earlier on 21 May 2001.)

Other live musical performances included Stereophonics, Badly Drawn Boy and Tom Jones.

== Shows since 2006 ==
On 18 August 2006, Amnesty International announced that it was reviving the Secret Policeman's Ball title for its forthcoming benefit show – a one-night show to be held at the Royal Albert Hall, London, on 14 October 2006. The name that had by then become the colloquially used umbrella title for all of Amnesty's fund-raisers. The 2006 show was coordinated by British comedian Eddie Izzard – who had coordinated the 2001 Amnesty show.

=== 2006 – The Secret Policeman's Ball 2006 ===
The 13th show in the Amnesty series took place at the Royal Albert Hall, London, on 14 October 2006.

Unlike the first (1976–1981) era of Amnesty shows featuring mainly internationally known stars – the line-up mirrored the later (1987–1989 and 1991–2001) eras of Amnesty shows with the vast majority of performers being little known outside the UK. The one internationally known British performer – Eddie Izzard – headlined a roster of locally popular acts – including Russell Brand, Jon Culshaw, Al Murray, The Mighty Boosh and Meera Syal. Four American performers also made cameo appearances: comedic actor Chevy Chase appeared in a skit along with actor Seth Green – and comedians Jimmy Fallon and Sarah Silverman also performed. There was a cameo from actor Richard E. Grant and animations featuring familiar voices including Jennifer Saunders. Music was supplied by The Zutons and The Magic Numbers.

The 2006 edition of The Secret Policeman's Ball was not filmed for international theatrical release, but was instead videotaped for a UK TV special of highlights that was broadcast by Britain's Channel 4 on 31 October 2006. A DVD with 90 minutes of highlights from the three-hour event was also issued. There was also a "cinecast" in which the event was shown live in 17 cinemas in major British cities.

=== 2008 – The Secret Policeman's Ball 2008 ===
In July 2008, Amnesty announced that it would present another show to be titled The Secret Policeman's Ball 2008. Like its immediate predecessor, the show was a single-night event at London's Royal Albert Hall which took place on Saturday 4 October 2008.

The majority of the performers were again British (or UK-based) and not well known outside Great Britain, (one Canadian comedian Russell Peters and one American comedian Kristen Schaal were involved). There were contradictory announcements about the cast list for the show, with one "finalised line-up" for the event announced on Amnesty's webpage and a different "finalised cast list" announced by the event's broadcaster Channel 4 indicating a lack of coordination between the two wings of the production.

The show included appearances from Frank Skinner, Alan Carr, Graham Norton, Sean Lock, Kristen Schaal, Fearne Cotton, Matt Berry, Katherine Parkinson, Mitchell and Webb, Jason Manford, Shappi Khorsandi, Russell Howard, Katy Brand, Tim Minchin, Sarah Millican, Kayvan Novak, Meera Syal, Shaun Williamson, Sharon Horgan, Nick Mohammed, Dan Clark, David Armand, Eddie Izzard, Ed Byrne, Deborah Meaden, Jon Culshaw, Gok Wan, and Mike Fenton Stevens. Additionally, Keane and Razorlight gave musical performances while Russell Peters appeared via video-tape.

The three-hour event was video-taped and a 95-minute television version was broadcast the following day on Channel 4 (UK). There was also a "cinecast" in which the event was shown live in 35 cinemas in major British cities in addition to four cinemas in Australia and cinemas in six of Canada's thirteen provinces and territories. The Cineplex cinema chain made the film available on 50 of its 1,317 screens.

=== 2012 – The Secret Policeman's Ball 2012 ===
Coinciding with Amnesty's 50th anniversary, the 2012 edition of The Secret Policeman's Ball took place outside of the UK for the first time under that title. It was staged on 4 March 2012 at Radio City Music Hall in New York City. The three-hour show featured a mix of prominent comedians from both Britain and the United States. After a taped introduction by Archbishop Desmond Tutu, the live comedy lineup included US comedic performers: Jon Stewart, Ben Stiller, Fred Armisen, Kristen Wiig, Seth Meyers, Jason Sudeikis, Bobby Moynihan, Jay Pharoah, and Taran Killam (from Saturday Night Live), Rachel Dratch, David Cross & Bob Odenkirk, Hannibal Buress, Sarah Silverman, Paul Rudd, Rashida Jones, Chris O'Dowd, Bill Hader (as Julian Assange), Rex Lee (as Kim Jong-un), comedic music by Reggie Watts.

Participating UK comedians were: Russell Brand, Eddie Izzard, Peter Serafinowicz, David Walliams, Jimmy Carr, Catherine Tate, Noel Fielding, Matt Berry, Micky Flanagan, Jack Whitehall, John Oliver.

Also appearing were actors Tim Roth and Liam Neeson. Neeson introduced a short presentation by formerly imprisoned Burmese comedian and political activist Zarganar. There was a cameo appearance by Richard Branson in one skit. There were music sets, each of three songs, by Mumford & Sons and Coldplay. There were real-time comedic commentaries on the show from Statler and Waldorf of the Muppets and from Beavis and Butt-head in animated sequences. Monty Python alumni Michael Palin, Eric Idle, and Terry Jones appeared in pre-recorded video segments explaining comedically why they were not there. The event was streamed live in the USA on Epix, and televised by Channel 4 in the UK.

== Shows and performers ==
=== List of shows ===
- 1976: A Poke in the Eye (With a Sharp Stick) – the film version was titled Pleasure at Her Majesty's – (Her Majesty's Theatre, London, 1–3 April 1976)
- 1977: An Evening Without Sir Bernard Miles – TV and album versions were titled The Mermaid Frolics – (The Mermaid Theatre, London, 8 May 1977)
- 1979: The Secret Policeman's Ball, (Her Majesty's Theatre, London, 27–30 June 1979)
- 1981: The Secret Policeman's Other Ball, (Theatre Royal, Drury Lane, London, 9–12 September 1981)
- 1987: The Secret Policeman's Third Ball, (The London Palladium, London, 26–29 March 1987)
- 1988: Amnesty International Festival of Youth, (Milton Keynes Bowl, 18–19 June 1988)
- 1989: The Secret Policeman's Biggest Ball, (The Cambridge Theatre, London, 30 August – 2 September 1989)
- 1991: Barf Bites Back, (Duke of York's Theatre, London, 1991)
- 1991: Big 30 (Amnesty's 30th Anniversary), (Central Independent Television Studios, Nottingham, 13 & 15 December 1991)
- 1997: So You Think You're Irish, (Gaiety Theatre, Dublin)
- 1998: So You Think You're Irish 2, (Dublin)
- 2001: We Know Where You Live, (Wembley Arena, London, June 2001)
- 2006: The Secret Policeman's Ball 2006, (Royal Albert Hall, London, 14 October 2006)
- 2008: The Secret Policeman's Ball 2008, (Royal Albert Hall, London, 4 October 2008)
- 2012: The Secret Policeman's Ball 2012, (Radio City Music Hall, New York City, 4 March 2012)

=== List of performers 1976 to 2001 ===
==== Comic performers ====
===== Comedy troupes =====
- The Monty Python team of Graham Chapman, John Cleese, Terry Gilliam, Terry Jones, and Michael Palin. (The sole exception is Eric Idle who did not participate in any Amnesty shows until the 2012 Secret Policeman's Ball)
- The Beyond the Fringe team: Alan Bennett, Peter Cook, Jonathan Miller. (Dudley Moore participated in just one show with Peter Cook – but not as part of Beyond The Fringe)
- The Goodies team of Tim Brooke-Taylor, Graeme Garden and Bill Oddie.

===== Solo performers and "double-acts" =====
Rowan Atkinson, Eleanor Bron, Connie Booth, Jasper Carrott, Billy Connolly, Dawn French, Stephen Fry, Lenny Henry, Chris Langham, Hugh Laurie, Griff Rhys Jones, John Bird, John Fortune, Jimmy Mulville, Sir Peter Ustinov, Robbie Coltrane, Clive James, Jonathan Lynn, John Wells, Ben Elton, Adrian Edmondson, Alexei Sayle, Carol Cleveland, Jennifer Saunders, Victoria Wood, and Ruby Wax.

==== Musical performers ====
Tim Minchin

===== Solo performers =====
Joan Armatrading, Chet Atkins, Kate Bush, Bob Geldof, Phil Collins, David Gilmour, Mark Knopfler, Morrissey, Tom Robinson, Sting, Pete Townshend, John Williams, Neil Innes, Donovan, Eric Clapton, Peter Gabriel and Jeff Beck

===== Bands =====
U2, Duran Duran, World Party, Stereophonics

==== Cameo appearances ====
Public figures who have made cameo appearances in the shows:

- 1979 show: Anna Ford, Mike Brearley, Melvyn Bragg, Clive Jenkins
- 1987 show: Richard Branson
- 2001 show: Kate Moss

== Film, video and audio formats ==
Adaptations of the shows have been released in various film, video and audio formats over the years. Because there have been many different versions released in different configurations in different countries over the years, there has been some public confusion as to which version is which.

The confusion is most notable in respect of the two widely different versions of the film The Secret Policeman's Other Ball. The only home-video/DVD version presently available is based on the UK version of the film. There is currently no home-video version of the very different, original 1982 US version of the film.

The first two Amnesty productions Pleasure at Her Majesty's (1976) and The Mermaid Frolics (1977) have only been released on home video in truncated form. Video reissues of The Secret Policeman's Ball (1979) and The Secret Policeman's Other Ball (1981) have also had original sequences edited out.

The US compilation The Secret Policeman's Private Parts (1983) – that featured special additional content and outtakes not included in the original UK films – has not been available in any format since the early 1980s and was only released in the US.

The most recent home-video release has been a 5-disc box set of DVDs entitled The Secret Policeman's Ball: 25th Anniversary Silver Box Set. Released on region zero international format. The discs feature the edited, truncated versions of the earlier films.

The original audio albums of comedy and music from the shows have not been commercially available since the early 1990s.

Shout! Factory released The Secret Policeman's Balls in January 2009. The 3-DVD set includes Pleasure at Her Majesty's (1976), The Secret Policeman's Ball (1979), The Secret Policeman's Other Ball (1981), The Secret Policeman's Third Ball (1987) and The Secret Policeman's Biggest Ball (1989). In early 2010, Shout! Factory released the DVD The Secret Policeman's Private Party, featuring the best comedic moments from various Secret Policeman's Balls.

To celebrate the 30th anniversary of The Secret Policeman's Ball, Shout! Factory partnered with Amnesty International on a collection of musical highlights entitled "The Secret Policeman Rocks." The 14-track CD was released on 29 September 2009. A DVD of the 2012 US edition was released in North America in 2013.

== Books ==
- The Very Best of... The Secret Policeman's Ball: The Greatest Comedy Line-up Ever (2014)

Tagline: "The very best of British comedy, from Monty Python to Russell Brand in one amazing anthology"
Publisher: Canongate UK (ISBN 978-0-85786-736-0)

- The Secret Policeman's Third Ball (1987)

Book containing transcripts of skits and monologues, lyrics of songs, photographs, of the 1987 show.
Publisher: Sidgwick and Jackson (1987) (ISBN 0-283-99530-0)

- The Secret Policeman's Other Ball (1981)

Book containing transcripts of skits and monologues, lyrics of songs, photographs, of the 1981 show. Also features production notes and comedic observations about the show by Michael Palin and Terry Jones.
Editors: Martin Lewis & Peter Walker
Publisher: Eyre Methuen (1981) (ISBN 0-413-50080-2)

== Print media ==
- Jim Henke, Human Rights Now! (Bloomsbury 1988) ISBN 0-7475-0318-4
- Douglas L. McCall, Monty Python: A Chronological Listing of the Troupe's Creative Output, and Articles and Reviews about Them, 1969–1989
- Peter Biskind, Down and Dirty Pictures: Miramax, Sundance, and the Rise of Independent Film
- Rolling Stone Magazine – 20 July 1982 – British Comedy Has a Ball for Amnesty International
- Los Angeles Times – 4 September 1994 – Now For Something Completely Retro
- UK Daily Telegraph – 30 September 2006 – Historical profile
