= Peter Luff (campaigner) =

British campaigner

Peter John Roussel Luff FRSA FRGS (born 14 September 1946), is a British campaigner and activist. He has been active in a number of non-governmental organisations and is now Vice Chair of the Coalition for the International Court for the Environment. He was Director of Action for a Global Climate Community from 2004 to 2012, Director General of the Royal Commonwealth Society from 1997 to 2001, Director and Vice Chair of The European Movement UK, The International European Movement from 1986 to 1995 and Assistant Director of Amnesty International UK (1974–1978).

== Personal life ==
He was born in Brussels on 14 September 1946, educated at Eltham College and Swansea University where he graduated in politics and international relations. In 2013, he completed a master's degree in The Study of Religions at the School of Oriental and African Studies (SOAS).

== Career ==
His first post was with the Voluntary Committee on Overseas Aid and Development and subsequently as a Counselor with the UK Immigrants Advisory Service. He was appointed Assistant Director of Amnesty International UK in 1974, where he directed several country campaigns and organised the first UK Trades Union Human Rights conference. With John Cleese, he originated and produced ‘A Poke in the Eye’ and ‘The Mermaids Frolics’, the first two shows in The Secret Policeman's Ball (1979) comedy series.

In 2002, he co-produced, with Caroline Warner, another comedy revue – ‘Peter Cook: a Posthumorous Tribute’ for The Peter Cook Foundation with a cast including David Frost, Terry Jones, Dilly Keane, Clive Anderson, Angus Deayton, David Baddiel, Josie Lawrence, Bonnie Langford and Mark Watson.

He was an assistant producer on the series Prisoners of Conscience at the BBC (1979–1981). Until 2001, Peter Luff was Director of the Royal Commonwealth Society, a pan-Commonwealth non-governmental organisation, supported by a worldwide membership, working to inform and educate people in all 54 member states about the work and importance of the Commonwealth.

Action for a Global Climate Community was an NGO seeking to find a mechanism to enable the European Union to tackle the problems of climate change together with democracies in the developing world’. As director and chief executive, Peter Luff organised with Dr Joachim Schellnhuber, founding director of the Potsdam Climate Impact Research, three conferences that brought together EU President, Jose Manuel Barroso’s Climate Advisory Council together with Prime Minister Manmohan Singh’s Climate Advisory Council.The conferences were held in Potsdam, New Delhi and London and a final report entitled Enhancing Cooperation - Report of the High-Level India-EU Dialogue (2009).'

Between 2005 and 2022, Peter Luff was on the Board of the World Federalist Movement-Institute for Global Policy where he served as Vice President and then Acting Chair of the WFM-IGP Congress.’

Peter Luff is presently Vice Chair of the Coalition for an International Court for the Environment. Www.icecoalition.org

He has written three books: The Simple Guide to Maastricht, The Reform of the United Nations with Georges Berthoin and A Brilliant Conspiracy – a study of the European federal agenda and a pamphlet.

Peter Luff is a Fellow of the Royal Society of Arts & Manufacturers and the Royal Geographical Society; a member of the Royal Institute for International Affairs and is a former Trustee of Responding to Conflict and the European Multicultural Foundation.

== European Movement ==
Peter Luff was director of the European Movement between 1986 - 1992, when he moved to become Vice-President and Deputy Secretary-General of the international European Movement in Brussels (1992-1995). He returned as Chair of the European Movement UK between 2004 and 2007 and worked during the referendum campaign as a special adviser to the Chair, Laura Sandys.
