= Jack Healey =

American human rights activist (born 1938)

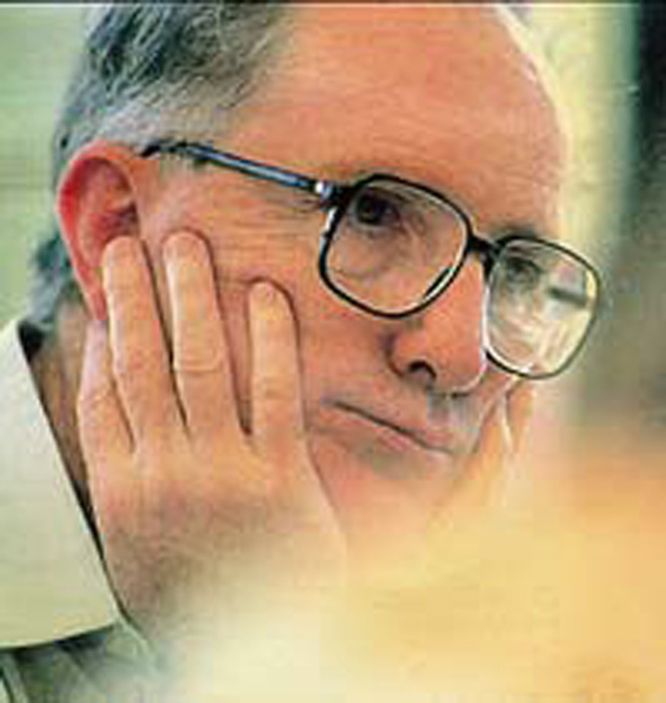
Jack Healey

Jack Healey (born 1938) is an American human rights activist, author and the former director of Amnesty International USA. He is best known as the organizer of Amnesty's benefit concerts in the 1980s featuring bands like U2, the Police, Peter Gabriel, Bruce Springsteen, Sting, Sinead O’Connor, Bob Dylan, Santana, Tracy Chapman and others.

Healey heads the Washington, D.C.–based Human Rights Action Center, (HRAC), a non-profit 501(c)(3) organization. His projects include printing the Universal Declaration of Human Rights into all passports and bringing Nobel Peace Prize winner Aung San Suu Kyi to power in Burma.

== Early life and education ==
Born into an Irish-American Catholic family as the youngest of eleven children, Healey grew up in Pittsburgh, Pennsylvania. His mother was a teacher and his father was a metallurgist at Superior Steel, a steel rolling plant located in Pittsburgh.

He studied at St. Fidelis Seminary for high school and college and received a master's degree from Catholic University. He was a Franciscan friar for ten years and a Catholic priest for four years.

== Career ==
Healey left the priesthood in 1968 and began work as Director of the Young World Development Program at Freedom from Hunger Foundation USA for five years.

At the Young World Development Program, Healey produced over 300 Walks for Development. A total of $12 million was raised from these walks and given to national and international non-profits, including Meals for Millions, The Free Clinic, and Freedom Farm Co-op of Fannie Lu Hamer. They also funded Catholic Relief Service, Church World Service, Heifer, and Oxfam International and other international non-profit organizations.

From 1973 to 1976, Healey worked at the Center for Community Change (CCC) in Washington, D.C. At CCC, Healey helped to build the Binder Schweitzer Hospital in Mexico and co-directed the Dick Gregory World Hunger Run across the United States. Dick Gregory won the Dawson Award from the Black Caucus for this run. Healey, along with George O’Hara, recruited Muhammad Ali to join Dick's Hunger Run.

From 1977 until 1981, Healey directed the Peace Corps in Lesotho. During his time as director of the Peace Corps, he was also a presence on morning, afternoon and evening shows such as Oprah, 60 Minutes and Nightline.

After finishing his tour with the Peace Corps, he worked as the director of Amnesty International USA for 12 years.

Healey has received seven honorary doctorates and spoken in colleges and high schools. He has produced three music albums and Douye, a documentary on Aung San Suu Kyi. Additionally, Healey worked as a consultant to both the Center of Victims of Torture in Haiti, and to comedian Dick Gregory on the topic of world hunger.

Healey helped to start the Reebok Human Rights Foundation, which hands out the Reebok Human Rights Award each year, and two other non-profits, Witness (human rights group) and Equality Now.

Healey gained attention in 1990 when he worked with other human rights activists to block the entrance to a UN Human Rights conference set to take place in Vienna, because the UN refused to seat the Dalai Lama. In 1992, Healey spoke out against the U.S. government when Haitian refugees fleeing harm from a dictatorial government were turned away from the United States border. Healey campaigned to free Aung San Suu Kyi from house arrest.

== Media projects ==
=== Concerts/film/albums ===
1976: Dick Gregory’s World Hunger Run

To highlight world hunger, Jack worked as Advisor to Dick Gregory on his World Hunger Run from Los Angeles to New York, ending on July 4, 1976, in New York. Dick Gregory won the Dawson Award from the Black Causus for this run.

1986: A Conspiracy of Hope Tour

This two week tour for human rights included musicians Peter Gabriel, U2, Lou Reed, Joan Baez, Bryan Adams, Miles Davis, Bob Dylan, The Police, Jackson Browne, Santana, the Hooters, Third World and Bob Geldof.

Traveling to San Francisco, Los Angeles, Denver, Atlanta, Chicago, and Giants Stadium in New Jersey, this tour furthered awareness of Amnesty International in the US, raised $3 million, and brought in 45,000 new US members within a month. MTV and Fox Network both ran the last show internationally for a period of eleven hours, and the show won a national award and brought the show into the colleges and high schools of the United States. Because of the success of the show, Healey was recognized by MTV as humanitarian of the year. The tour was co-produced by Bill Graham, Mary Daly and Jack Healey.

1988: Human Rights Now! Tour

In 1988, for the 40th anniversary of the Declaration of Human Rights, Healey organized the 6-week Human Rights Now! World tour to celebrate achievements of the human rights movement and to introduce the idea of basic human rights protection through the power of the media to millions of people worldwide. Over a million people filled the stadiums, and crowded into fields for concerts in South America, Eastern Europe, Africa and Asia. The concert was broadcast to over one billion people worldwide. The tour covered 18 countries in six weeks, and won the Pollster Reader's Award for number of viewers, beating out Michael Jackson's worldwide tour. HBO covered this show on a 3-hour special. This show tripled the membership of Amnesty International worldwide.

Musicians included Bruce Springsteen, Sting, Peter Gabriel, Tracy Chapman, and Youssou N'Dour

1990: From A Hug to a Hope Concert

As a celebration of the human rights victory in Chile after the fall of dictator Pinochet, Healey organized a two-day concert with Sting, Peter Gabriel, Sinéad O'Connor, Jackson Browne, Ruben Blades, Wynton Marsalis and New Kids on the Block.

The show took place in a stadium previously used as a prison for political dissidents, and a home to some of the many tortures and executions that took place under Pinochet's rule. Families of the victims of the prison attended the concert, and celebrated the great victory for the Chilean people and for human rights activists around the world.

This live show was broadcast 10 hours a day for 2 days to all of Latin America, Mexico and Spain. As a result of the concert, Jackson Browne was able to free two political prisoners still jailed in Chile.

1991:'Free to Laugh'

In 1991, Healey produced this three-hour show on Lifetime as a benefit for Amnesty International. Comedy and music by Woody Harrelson, Jackson Browne, Lily Tomlin, Vanessa L. Williams, Roseanne Barr, Anjelica Huston, Daryl Hannah and Tom Arnold. Produced by Bob Meyerwitz, this program was nominated for a CableACE Award.

1999: Bangkok Concert for ASSK

This show was produced in support of Aung San Suu Kyi.

The 8/8/88 Uprising in Burma was a national revolution demanding democracy. It took place on August 8, 1988. This show took place on September 9, 1999 (9.9.99). The emphasis on the date was a reminder to the military that the world was carefully watching.

Raven-Symoné headlined the show.

2001: Seattle UN F.A.O. Groundwork

Healey and Mel Chikone CHECK produced an International Concert Series to Support the FAO/UN Global Anti-Hunger Campaign. LOOK UP ALL ARTISTS Artists included R.E.M., Joe Strummer, Michael Franti & Spearhead, Pearl Jam, Alanis Morissette, Dave Matthews, Femi Kuti, Emmylou Harris, Maná, The Wallflowers, The Blind Boys of Alabama, Joe Strummer and The Mescaleros, Artis the Spoonman and many more.

2008: Burma: It Can't Wait Healey partnered with the US Campaign for Burma and Fanista.com to create a revolutionary human rights media advocacy campaign in support of Aung San Suu Kyi and her cause. Over the course of 30 days, the world of actors, artists, musicians, soccer, and others responded to the need to tell the public stories about Burma. This campaign, unlike most non-profit campaigns, addressed Burma and Aung San Suu Kyi through story-telling, veering away from the traditional Public Service Announcement.

50,000 people joined the US Campaign for Burma as a result of this campaign. They continue to be up on YouTube and on the US Campaign for Burma ’s website.

Artists involved include: Will Ferrell, Sarah Silverman, Jennifer Aniston, Woody Harrelson, James Cameron, Judd Apatow, William Baldwin, Hank Azaria, Michelle Krusiec, Tila Tequila, Kim Kardashian, Damian Marley, Sheryl Crow, Felicity Huffman, Elliot Page, Joseph Fiennes, Jason Schwartzman, Eddie Izzard, Jorja Fox, Eric Szmanda, Anjelica Huston, Famke Janssen, Sylvester Stallone, Steven Seagal, Norman Lear, Tich Naht Hahn, Brett Dennen, Matisyahu, Giovanni Ribisi, Diego Maradona, Mana, Julie Benz, Eva Longoria, Davood Roostaei, Jackson Browne, Wallace Langham, Jason Biggs, and Jenny Mollen.

Present: Universal Declaration of Human Rights

The Human Rights Action Center put out an animated version of the document written by Eleanor Roosevelt 60 years ago. The animation, in five languages, is being translated into Persian and Icelandic.

The newest addition to the campaign is an image of Aung San Suu Kyi created by world-renowned artist Shepard Fairey, who created the iconic image of Obama that so helped the campaign to take hold among young Americans.

=== Films ===
- 2005:'DOUYE!' (Our Cause) - A 30-minute documentary on Burma and Aung San Suu Kyi.
- 'Keeper of the Flame'
- Jim Carrey for Burma - The Call to Action on YouTube
- Burma: It Can’t Wait
- Aung San Suu Kyi Animation on YouTube

=== Albums ===
1991: Punks for Human Rights with Joe Strummer

Generations One: A Punk Look at Human Rights

This CD compilation is a tribute to Eleanor Roosevelt, who led the United Nations to adopt the Universal Declaration of Human Rights in 1948. Generation one features tracks by Electric Dog House, band by The Clash singer/songwriter/guitarist Joe Strummer, Green Day, Bad Brains, and Lagwagon.

2004 For the Lady

The Human Rights Action Center and Lock Bingham produced the album for the US Campaign for Burma. 27 major musicians united on a two-CD set to support freedom for 1991 Nobel Peace Prize recipient Aung San Suu Kyi and the people of Burma. Artists include Paul McCartney, R.E.M., Avril Lavigne, Ani DiFranco, Damien Rice, Coldplay, Eric Clapton, Peter Gabriel, Sting, U2, Bright Eyes, Talib Kweli, Lili Haydn, Natalie Merchant, Mana, Rebecca Fanya, Ben Harper, The Nightwatchman, Bonnie Raitt, Travis, Guster, Hourcast, Indigo Girls, Better than Ezra, Matchbox Twenty, and Mun Awng. All proceeds from the CD benefit the efforts of the US Campaign for Burma.

Groundwork

Groundwork is an album sold in Starbucks that included artists from the concert in Seattle in 2001. It raised money to end world hunger, and to fund small grassroots organizations around the world. The concert and album led to the formation of the organization Growing Connection, which sponsors schools worldwide to grow their own food.
