= The Secret Policeman's Other Ball =

Show benefitting Amnesty International

The Secret Policeman's Other Ball was the fourth of the benefit shows staged by the British Section of Amnesty International to raise funds for its research and campaign work in the human rights field. It was the second of many shows to bear the celebrated "Secret Policeman's" title that became the iconic series known informally as The Secret Policeman's Balls.

The show took place at the Theatre Royal, Drury Lane in London over four nights between Wednesday 9 September and Saturday 12 September 1981. It was a successor to the 1979 show The Secret Policeman's Ball. Not all artists appeared at all performances: Phil Collins, for example, could not commit to all four shows, and was only present at the last two shows.

The show was directed by Monty Python alumnus John Cleese and produced by Martin Lewis and Peter Walker (Amnesty's fundraising officer). It subsequently yielded two separate movies (one version for the UK, directed by Julien Temple, and a quite different version for the US) and two record albums (one each of comedy and music performances). The film was distributed by Miramax.

The budget of the 1981 film was £125,000 with finance coming from Amnesty.

== Reception ==
In 1982 it was reported the film's commercial performance was "Up to expectations though slower than wished. Nevertheless is doing better business than the first film. Is a good stayer."

It made $1.8 million.

The show was very influential in galvanizing rock musicians to become involved in the human rights issue and in other political and social causes in subsequent decades. Musicians who performed at the show who subsequently became activists in various fields include Sting, Bob Geldof, Eric Clapton, Phil Collins, Donovan and Midge Ure.

== Track listing of the music album ==
Side 1

1. "Roxanne" – Sting (3:06)
2. "Message in a Bottle" – Sting (3:44)
3. "'Cause We've Ended as Lovers" – Jeff Beck and Eric Clapton (3:47)
4. "Farther Up the Road" – Jeff Beck and Eric Clapton (4:46)
5. "Crossroads" – Jeff Beck and Eric Clapton (4:15)
6. "I Don't Like Mondays" – Bob Geldof and Johnny Fingers (4:54)

Side 2

1. "In The Air Tonight" – Phil Collins (5:10)
2. "The Roof Is Leaking" – Phil Collins (3:34)
3. "The Universal Soldier" – Donovan (3:00)
4. "Catch The Wind" – Donovan (2:32)
5. "I Shall Be Released" – The Secret Police (9:20)

=== Charts ===
Chart (1982)	Peak position
Australia (Kent Music Report)	17
Canada Top Albums/CDs (RPM)	3
New Zealand Albums (RMNZ)	31
US Billboard 200	29

== Track listing of the VHS ==
1. "Roxanne" – Sting
2. "Message in a Bottle" – Sting
3. "Farther Up The Road" – Jeff Beck and Eric Clapton
4. "'Cause We've Ended as Lovers" – Jeff Beck and Eric Clapton
5. "The Roof Is Leaking" – Phil Collins
6. "In The Air Tonight" – Phil Collins
7. "Sunshine Superman" – Donovan
8. "Catch The Wind" – Donovan
9. "Colours" – Donovan
10. "I Don't Like Mondays" – Bob Geldof and Johnny Fingers
11. "Glad to Be Gay" – Tom Robinson
12. "Won't Get Fooled Again" – Pete Townshend
13. "Drowned" – Pete Townshend
14. "I Shall Be Released" – The Secret Police

== Track listing of the comedy album ==
Side 1

1. A Word of Thanks (w:Rowan Atkinson/John Cleese/Ronald Eyre) performed by Rowan Atkinson, John Cleese and John Bird.
2. Road Safety – Rowan Atkinson.
3. Australian Motor Insurance Claims – Jasper Carrott.
4. Card Dance (w:Tim Brooke-Taylor, Graham Chapman, John Cleese and Marty Feldman for 'At Last the 1948 Show') performed by John Cleese, Graham Chapman and Tim Brooke-Taylor. They are dressed in evening suits but are pretending to be naked - and each perform with two pieces of cardboard discreetly placed (Tim's pieces of paper get progressively smaller during the routine).
5. Had It Up To Here – Victoria Wood.
6. Men's Talk (w:Alan Bennett) performed by Alan Bennett and John Fortune.
7. What's on in Stoke Newington – Alexei Sayle.

Side 2

1. The Royal Australian Prostate Foundation (w:Chris Langham) performed by Dame Edna Everage.
2. Denis on the Menace – John Wells.
3. Beekeeping (w:Brooke-Taylor/Chapman/Cleese and Feldman for 'At Last the 1948 Show') performed by Rowan Atkinson and John Cleese.
4. Song in a French Accent – Neil Innes.
5. Divorce Service (w:John Cormack) performed by Rowan Atkinson, Griff Rhys Jones, Pamela Stephenson and John Fortune.
6. Reading the Riot Act – Chris Langham.
7. Top of the Form (w:John Cleese) performed by John Cleese, Griff Rhys Jones, John Fortune, Rowan Atkinson, Tim Brooke-Taylor, John Bird and Graham Chapman.
8. Drinking – Billy Connolly.

== Performers ==
The performers in the stage production were:

- Rowan Atkinson, Jeff Beck, Alan Bennett, John Bird, Tim Brooke-Taylor, Jasper Carrott, Graham Chapman, Eric Clapton, John Cleese, Phil Collins, Billy Connolly, Donovan, John Fortune, Bob Geldof, Barry Humphries, Neil Innes, Chris Langham, Griff Rhys Jones, Alexei Sayle, Pamela Stephenson, Sting, Pete Townshend, John Wells and Victoria Wood.
