= Martin Lewis (humorist) =

British humorist (born 1952)

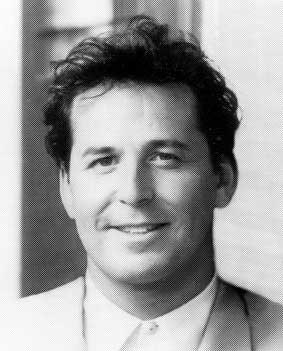
- Born: 24 July 1952 (age 74); Ashtead, Surrey, England
- Occupations: Humorist, writer, producer, radio & television personality, marketing strategist
- Spouse(s): Robin Sloan (?–?, divorced)
- Website: martinlewis.com

Martin Neil Lewis (born 24 July 1952) is a US-based English humorist, writer, radio personality/TV host, producer, and marketing strategist. He is known for his participation in a variety of projects in the arts and entertainment worlds, including his work as the co-creator and co-producer of the Secret Policeman's Balls benefit shows for Amnesty International (a series he created with Monty Python alumnus John Cleese and Amnesty fund-raising officer Peter Walker) and as a comedic performer and writer on American TV. Lewis hosts his own daily radio show, heard in America on Sirius Satellite Radio and worldwide on Sirius Internet Radio. He is an occasional contributor to The Huffington Post website.

Described by L.A. Weekly as "a true Renaissance Man", Lewis' career has encompassed work in music, comedy, TV, radio, film, theatre, books and politics. Lewis' official website credits the diversity in his professional life to his having been inspired by individuals with whom he worked early in his career and who were noted polymaths, including Peter Ustinov, Peter Cook and Monty Python alumni Michael Palin and Terry Jones.

== Producer ==
Lewis has worked since 1974 as a producer of comedy and music recordings, stage shows, films, music videos, TV shows, DVDs and radio programs.

Arguably his most notable work has been co-creating and producing the Secret Policeman's Ball series of benefits for Amnesty International (initially held 1976–1981) that brought together comedic talents (including Monty Python, Beyond The Fringe, Rowan Atkinson and Billy Connolly) and rock musicians (including Paul McCartney, Pete Townshend, Sting, Eric Clapton, Jeff Beck, Phil Collins, Tom Robinson, Donovan and Bob Geldof.) In addition to producing the original stage shows, Lewis produced albums, TV specials and movies that documented the shows. The film of the fourth show of the series, The Secret Policeman's Other Ball, was a box office success in the UK and US in 1982 and also inspired a book co-edited by Lewis. The series continued through the 1980s and 1990s (though the Secret Policeman's Ball name was not used after the 1989 show). In 2006, Amnesty revived the Secret Policeman's Ball title for its fundraising shows and this prompted multiple press articles in Britain reflecting on the impact of the original shows, including the attribution by Bob Geldof that Live Aid had been inspired in part by the shows.

A series of live, acoustic performances by rock musicians Pete Townshend, Sting, Phil Collins, Tom Robinson, Donovan and Bob Geldof that Lewis conceived and produced for the 1979 and 1981 Secret Policeman's shows are widely regarded as being one of the inspirations for the "Unplugged" format that was introduced by MTV in 1989.

His work as a comedy producer includes recordings with Sir Peter Ustinov, Peter Cook and Dudley Moore and the first audio recordings of new-wave British comedians such as Jennifer Saunders (of Absolutely Fabulous), Alexei Sayle, Rik Mayall and other performers in Britain's The Young Ones/Comic Strip comedy troupe. Many of these recordings were released on Lewis' own Springtime! Records label.

As a film producer, Lewis gained a reputation in the 1980s for engaging respected, veteran film directors such as Sam Peckinpah and Lindsay Anderson to work on film projects centered on contemporary music. Lewis produced Peckinpah's last works, a series of music videos featuring Julian Lennon. Anderson was hired by Lewis to direct Wham! in China: Foreign Skies, a film that documented the 1985 tour of China by the George Michael-led pop group Wham! which was the first visit to China by Western pop artists.

In 1995, Lewis produced a reunion of the Rutles, the comedic ensemble created by Monty Python alumni Eric Idle and Neil Innes in 1977 to lampoon the Beatles. Lewis executive-produced the band's Archaeology album, a pastiche of the Beatles' Anthology project.

In 1999, Lewis produced a special American tribute for It's... the Monty Python Story - the BBC's four-hour TV special on Monty Python's 30th anniversary. For this, Lewis conceived an animated sequence featuring the characters from South Park and he produced this tribute with series creators Trey Parker and Matt Stone.

Lewis' work in the DVD field includes producing the DVD edition of the Beatles' first film, A Hard Day's Night. He was Associate Producer of the DVD editions of the 1979 Who documentary The Kids Are Alright and the DVD release of all four full-length shows featuring live appearances by the Beatles on The Ed Sullivan Show.

Lewis has also been a producer of TV specials for NBC, VH1 and E! Entertainment TV.

== Television personality ==
Lewis has appeared on American TV since 1990 as a satirist, commentator, comedic performer and special correspondent. He has been co-host of US TV specials celebrating award shows (The Academy Awards, The Golden Globes, The British Academy Awards, and The BRIT Awards (the British Grammys)). He frequently appears as a commentator discussing politics and pop culture on a broad array of major US TV networks. He has appeared as a satirist or comedic performer on shows such Politically Incorrect HBO's Night Rap, VH1's My Generation, and The Tom Arnold Show. He has also appeared on British TV, serving as US correspondent for BBC shows such as The Terry Wogan Show and Good Morning.

== Radio host and correspondent ==
Lewis has hosted and produced his own daily radio show heard nationally on Steven Van Zandt's Underground Garage channel on Sirius Satellite Radio since 2005. Prior to that, Lewis hosted his own weekly radio show in Los Angeles on KGIL and wrote, hosted and produced a series of radio specials for Los Angeles radio station KLSX.

From 1998 to 2004 Lewis was a regular commentator on the British radio program Up All Night on BBC Radio 5 Live (heard in the UK and worldwide on the internet) offering perspectives on American politics and pop culture. He was a Special Correspondent for the show during the political conventions in the 2000 and 2004 US presidential elections and also reported for the show from Washington DC during the 2001 inauguration of George W. Bush.

== Comedic performer ==
Lewis has written two autobiographical one-man stage-shows - Great Exploitations! and Murder, He Wrote! Great Exploitations! was selected for inclusion in the 9th Annual Toyota Comedy Festival (June 2001) in New York and was the debut production at the Steven Spielberg Theatre in Los Angeles in July 1999.

Lewis has been a Master of Ceremonies for multiple awards shows and benefits, including the Hollywood Reporter Key Art Awards (2000), the Academy of Interactive Arts & Sciences' annual Interactive Achievement Awards (2001) and the American Cinematheque's Moving Picture Ball honoring Michael Douglas (1993).

Lewis also wrote and performed additional comedic material incorporated on the 1994 CD-ROM Monty Python's Complete Waste of Time (7th Level)

== Writer ==
Lewis started his career in 1970 as a freelance journalist writing for British music weeklies such as the New Musical Express, Record Mirror and Disc. He has written speeches, commercials and material for many entertainers including members of Monty Python as well as Peter Cook, Dudley Moore, Jennifer Aniston, Zsa Zsa Gabor, Elliott Gould, Teri Hatcher, Anjelica Huston, Quincy Jones, Patrick Macnee, Roger Moore, Sarah Jessica Parker, Sally Jessy Raphael and Susan Sarandon.

He was the writer of the 1998 VH1 Honors Awards – Divas Live - which launched the VH1's Divas franchise and featured Celine Dion, Shania Twain, Mariah Carey, Gloria Estefan, and Aretha Franklin. He has also written for the annual British Academy Awards, collaborating with Oscar show writer Bruce Vilanch.

Lewis wrote the extensive "companion narrative" for the 1998 re-publication of Beatles manager Brian Epstein's 1964 autobiography A Cellarful of Noise (Pocket Books, 1998).

Lewis re-commenced his journalistic career in 2000 when he was invited to become a Special Correspondent for TIME.com, for which he covered the 2000 United States presidential election and various cultural events in 2001. Lewis writes columns for various online publications including Salon.com, the Huffington Post (for which he is a regular contributor) and his own Agent Provocateur literary website.

== Publicity and marketing strategist ==
Lewis also works as a publicity and marketing consultant through his company Springtime! which he founded in 1977.

Bob and Harvey Weinstein - founders of Miramax Films and the Weinstein Company have credited Lewis with providing the inspiration and prototype for their own expertise in movie marketing. A story about Lewis in The Hollywood Reporter in June 2001 included a joint statement by the Weinstein Brothers: "Back in 1982 when we were starting Miramax Films, Martin Lewis was the producer of what became our first hit movie - The Secret Policeman's Other Ball starring the Monty Pythons. Martin had a background in publicity and marketing and came up with a great campaign for the movie, creating a huge buzz and getting us free publicity, which was crucial to the film's success. We learned a lot about publicity and marketing from our experience with Martin Lewis."

Early in his career, Lewis had been a protégé of former Beatles publicist Derek Taylor - then working for the UK division of Warner/Elektra/Atlantic Records. Lewis subsequently worked at British independent record company Transatlantic Records as Director of Publicity & Marketing - where he worked on campaigns for musicians and comedic artists such as Gerry Rafferty, Billy Connolly, Ralph McTell, Gryphon, the Sadista Sisters, Mike Harding, the Pasadena Roof Orchestra, and the Portsmouth Sinfonia.

In 1994-1996 he reunited with Derek Taylor when he was engaged by Capitol Records as US marketing strategist for the Beatles' Anthology and Live at the BBC projects.

Other notable projects in recent years include the worldwide launch of Sir Paul McCartney's Music & Animation Collection DVD of animated musical films for children (2004), the 50th anniversary of the movie Blackboard Jungle and the 50th anniversary of the song "Rock Around the Clock" (2005).

His work as a marketing and publicity strategist includes two successful Oscar campaigns for movies that won the Academy Award for Best Picture: the 2005 Best Picture winner Crash and the 2011 Best Picture winner The King's Speech.

The promotional website Lewis wrote for the 2000 theatrical reissue of A Hard Day's Night won a Gold Pencil Award for the Best Promotional Website of 2000, awarded annually by The One Club.

== Film festival producer ==
Lewis is a long-term member of the Board of Trustees of The American Cinematheque. He has produced and hosted multiple film festivals in Los Angeles since 1993 including the Mods & Rockers Film Festival celebrating 1960s and rock-related movies (presented annually since 1999)- and Lust For Glory! the official 25th Anniversary celebrations of the Monty Python troupe (1994). Other film festivals produced and hosted by Lewis in Hollywood have saluted Peter Sellers, Richard Pryor, Peter Cook, Graham Chapman, Ken Russell, Nicolas Roeg, and the feature film output of Britain's Channel Four. He also organized the official celebrations marking the 90th birthday of actor Glenn Ford in 2006.

Lewis has served as Chairman of the British Academy of Film and Television Arts (Los Angeles), sitting on its board of directors for six years. He produced and hosted multiple film events for BAFTA/LA including co-presentations with the Academy of Motion Picture Arts and Sciences and The Directors Guild of America.

In 2009, Lewis instigated, produced and hosted The Secret Policeman's Film Festival an in-depth retrospective of 25 films and TV specials produced as fund-raisers for Amnesty International over the preceding three decades. The festival was presented over five weeks in the summer of 2009 in New York at Lincoln Center and the Paley Center For Media, Manhattan and in Los Angeles at the American Cinematheque's Grauman's Egyptian Theatre and the Paley Center For Media, Beverly Hills. The festival was subsequently presented in Washington DC in December 2009 at the American Film Institute coinciding with International Human Rights Day.

== The Beatles ==
Lewis worked as a consultant on several of the Beatles's projects, including: The Beatles Anthology, Live at the BBC, and the DVD releases of A Hard Day's Night and The Beatles on the Ed Sullivan Show. He was a consultant for Michael Lindsay-Hogg's 2000 VH1 television film, Two of Us, a fictionalized account of the last-ever encounter between John Lennon and Paul McCartney (in New York in 1976).

He created the Official Brian Epstein Website and spearheaded the campaign to have Epstein inducted into the Rock and Roll Hall of Fame.

In 2008, Lewis proposed to NASA that the Beatles' song "Across the Universe" be transmitted towards the North Star, Polaris, via the Deep Space Network antenna. The transmission was timed to coincide with celebrations marking the 50th anniversary of NASA, the 50th anniversary of the launch of America's first satellite, Explorer 1, and the 40th anniversary of the Beatles recording John Lennon's composition "Across the Universe".

== Artist management ==
Lewis is credited with discovering British comedian Alexei Sayle at the 1980 Edinburgh Festival and orchestrating Sayle's breakthrough success in 1980–1984. Other artists who have engaged Lewis' services include Eric Burdon, Donovan, and The Comets. Since 1973, he has been the manager of the infamous Portsmouth Sinfonia, the self-described World's Worst Orchestra, whose alumni include ambient pioneer Brian Eno, film composer Michael Nyman, avant-garde composer Gavin Bryars, and rock producer Clive Langer.

== Social activism ==
Lewis' work with Amnesty International has been credited by politically conscious and active artists such as Bono, Sting and Peter Gabriel as having been a factor in the growing social activism of rock musicians since the early 1980s. In a 1986 interview in Rolling Stone magazine, Bono said: "I saw The Secret Policeman's Ball and it became a part of me. It sowed a seed..." Live Aid and Live 8 organizer Bob Geldof's first-ever participation in a benefit show was at 1981's The Secret Policeman's Other Ball, the event where he first worked with Midge Ure who later collaborated on Geldof's worldwide fund-raisers.

Amnesty also credits Lewis with having a consultative role to Jack Healey in his creation of its 1988 Human Rights Now! world tour of all five continents that featured Bruce Springsteen, Sting and Peter Gabriel.

In December 2009, Lewis co-hosted an event saluting Amnesty International in Washington DC. The event was attended by Robert De Niro, Meryl Streep, Martin Short, Mel Brooks, Matthew Broderick, Carol Burnett, Jon Stewart, Jack Black, Edward Norton, Bruce Springsteen, Patti Scialfa, Sting, Trudie Styler, Eddie Vedder, Ben Harper, Laura Dern, Dave Brubeck, Herbie Hancock, Bob Balaban, Joe Mantegna, Bill Irwin, Richard Kind, Florence Henderson, Roger Bart, Gary Beach, Shuler Hensley, Cory English, Jennifer Nettles of Sugarland and opera singer Grace Bumbry. The event was co-hosted by Larry Cox, executive director of Amnesty International, USA.

== Personal life ==
Lewis was born in Ashtead, in the county of Surrey, in southern England. He was born into an Orthodox Jewish family. He was raised in Hampstead, in parts a bohemian enclave in northwest London. He was educated at a private school - University College School in Hampstead - but was expelled at the age of 14. He had no formal education after his expulsion.

He lived and worked in London until he moved to the United States in 1982. Between 1982 and 1988 he lived and worked in New York, where he was married to the former Robin Sloan, who later divorced him. He moved to Los Angeles in 1988 and has lived and worked there since. Lewis is single.
