= The Secret Policeman's Ball (1979) =

Benefit show staged by the British Section of Amnesty International

The Secret Policeman's Ball was the third of the benefit shows staged by Amnesty International to raise funds for its research and campaign work in the human rights field. In later years, other Amnesty benefit shows also bore the Secret Policeman's title. They are informally referred to as The Secret Policeman's Balls.

The Secret Policeman's Ball took place over four consecutive nights in London on 27–30 June 1979. It was a successor to the 1976 show A Poke in the Eye (With a Sharp Stick) (the film of which was titled Pleasure at Her Majesty's) and the 1977 show The Mermaid Frolics.

The show was directed by Monty Python alumnus John Cleese and producers Martin Lewis and Peter Walker. It subsequently yielded a one-hour TV special, a full-length film, and two record albums (one each of comedy and music performances).

One of the sketches in the show was Peter Cook's nine-minute parody of the judge's biased instructions to the jury in the recently concluded Jeremy Thorpe trial, titled "Entirely a Matter for You". Cook was inspired to write the monologue after reviews of the first night described the show as tame; he wrote the sketch that afternoon and performed it for the first time that night. The sketch was, according to authors Simon Freeman and Barrie Penrose, "actually not that different from the original". It is considered to be one of the finest works of Cook's career. Cook and show producer Martin Lewis brought out an album on Virgin Records titled Here Comes the Judge: Live of the live performance together with three studio tracks that further lampooned the Thorpe trial.

Musicians-turned-activists such as Sting, Peter Gabriel, Bob Geldof, and Bono have attributed their participation in human rights issues to their exposure to Amnesty via The Secret Policeman's Ball show. Bono told Rolling Stone magazine in 1986, "I saw The Secret Policeman's Ball and it became a part of me. It sowed a seed..."
