= Film Stars (Pete and Dud sketch) =

Comedy sketch by Peter Cook and Dudley Moore

Film Stars (also known as "A Spot of the Usual Trouble") is a well-known comedy sketch by Peter Cook and Dudley Moore. It originally featured on their BBC sketch show Not Only... But Also (1965) and was subsequently performed many times on stage by the duo.

== Summary ==
The sketch takes the form of a surreal dialogue between Cook and Moore's cloth-capped alter egos Pete and Dud, which sees them exchanging stories about being pursued by glamorous film stars in increasingly ludicrous situations. Pete starts by explaining how he received a telephone call from Betty Grable ("just the other night") asking him to fly out to her luxury yacht and spend the night with her. Dud tells Pete it's "funny [he] should say that" (this becomes a running gag throughout the sketch) and goes on to tell the tale about how he woke up in the middle of the night to discover Anna Magnani in his kitchen, "up to her knees in rice", demanding she make love to him. Dud's story reminds Pete of the time Greta Garbo scaled his drainpipe and tried to get into his bedroom via the window but Pete rejected her advances. Then Dud tells Pete about catching Jane Russell in his bed four nights ago. The sketch ends with Pete and Dud agreeing that film stars have taken too many liberties with them, and decide to go to the cinema.

== Background ==
Following the success of Beyond the Fringe (1960–65), the stars of the production (Jonathan Miller, Alan Bennett, Peter Cook and Dudley Moore) became household names. Moore was offered his own show by the BBC, tentatively titled The Dudley Moore Show. Peter Cook was invited to appear in the pilot episode performing in his persona of E. L. Wisty, made popular through his appearances on ITV's On the Braden Beat (1965). The monologue he presented involved Wisty claiming to have been besieged in his home by a number of Hollywood starlets demanding his romantic attention. Director Joe MacGrath liked the sketch so much he and Dudley spoke to Cook about adapting it into a two-hander.

== Legacy ==
The sketch is widely recognised as one of the duo's finest pieces and became the first of the 'Dagenham Duologues': a series of surreal conversations between the cloth-capped Pete and Dud on subjects as varied as art, politics and religion. It also set in place the style that would characterise Cook and Moore's subsequent work.

== Variants ==
The sketch was later revisited, in a rewritten form, for Cook and Moore's short-lived ITV show Goodbye Again (1967). This revised version involves Pete recounting how Brigitte Bardot telephoned him one evening to invite him to join her on her luxury yacht (an offer he rejected on the grounds that the couple have already "quaffed deep of the cup of love—c'est fini": an answer that led to Bardot beating her breasts against the receiver in mourning for their lost love), and how Sophia Loren unsuccessfully tried to lure him to her mansion in Cannes for a dirty weekend. The Derek and Clive albums (Live) (1976) and Come Again (1978) feature sketches based on Jayne Mansfield and Joan Crawford that employ the same structure as "Film Stars", albeit with a much darker content.
