= Voodoo Ray =

Single by A Guy Called Gerald
- Released: November 1988
- Recorded: June 1988
- Studio: Moonraker Studios (Manchester)
- Genre: Acid house; funk; techno
- Length: 4:27
- Label: Rham! (UK); Warlock (US)
- Songwriter: Gerald Simpson
- Producers: Gerald Simpson; Chapter

A Guy Called Gerald singles chronology
"Voodoo Ray" (1988)	"Hot Lemonade" (1989)

"Voodoo Ray", considered to be the first British-made acid house track, is the debut single by the British electronic musician Gerald Simpson, recording under the name A Guy Called Gerald. The single was released in the UK in 1988 on the 7" and 12" vinyl formats, on the Rham! label. The original single was later released in the United States in 1989 by Warlock Records.

The single spent 18 weeks on the UK Singles Chart, eventually reaching number 12, and was awarded best-selling independent single of 1989 by Music Week and the British Phonographic Industry. The track became a popular acid house anthem associated with Manchester club The Haçienda.

== Recording ==
"Voodoo Ray" began as a home demo recorded by Simpson while he was a member of 808 State. It was then re-recorded along with the surrounding EP over two days in June 1988 at Moonraker Studios in Manchester. The session featured production assistance from the duo of Aniff Akinola and Colin Thorpe (together credited as Chapter), as well as engineer Lee Monteverde. Simpson explained:

I was trying to keep it quiet from the dudes in 808 State, because I was still working with them but wanted to do my own thing. It was fun just slipping out of their basement and taking the drum machine. They'd be like, 'Where are you going?' I'd say, 'Oh, I'm just going home to do some programming,' then nip off to another studio.

The track contains samples of comedians Peter Cook and Dudley Moore (in character as Derek and Clive), from the "Bo Duddley" sketch as heard on their 1976 live album Derek and Clive (Live). Two samples from the sketch are heard: one of Cook saying "voodoo rage" and one of Moore shouting "later!". Simpson explained to Q in 2001: "I was trying to get a tribal sound and found this sample saying 'Voodoo rage'. That was originally the title but the old sampler I was using didn't have that much memory. I just about had enough for 'voodoo ra…', so that's what it became."

The vocal was sung by Nicola Collier, who had worked on other tracks with Simpson, with the vocal melody suggested by Thorpe and later processed by Simpson using an Akai S950 sampler.

== Release ==
Rham! initially pressed up 500 copies of the record, which sold out in a day. "Voodoo Ray" received support from local DJs and became popular at Factory Records' Manchester nightclub The Haçienda.

A version of the track also appeared on the compact disc version of Simpson's 1989 album Hot Lemonade, and a re-recorded version called "Voodoo Ray Americas" appeared on A Guy Called Gerald's 1990 album Automanikk, which was released by Columbia and CBS Records. In 1995, Simpson reworked "Voodoo Ray" as "Voodoo Rage" for his Black Secret Technology album.

== Critical reception ==
Bill Coleman of Billboard magazine commented on the single in March 1989: "Underground smash in the U.K. last summer utilizes the most intriguing elements of acid house and places them in a thoroughly engrossing dance setting. Yearning female chant and irresistible instrumental hook has the potential to make a huge impression with club and alternative programmers. A killer—don't miss."

== Impact and legacy ==
According to dance music historian Matt Anniss and others, "Voodoo Ray" is considered the first British-made acid house track. Anniss says the track is also considered the "most influential British house record of all time".

British electronic music magazine Mixmag ranked "Voodoo Ray" number 46 in its "100 Greatest Dance Singles of All Time" list in 1996, writing, "Voodoo Ray is pretty much the first British acid house record, and sounds like it was recorded by banging on metal pipes. Which is nice."

In the same year, British drum and bass DJ and producer Fabio named it one of his favourites, adding, "'Voodoo Ray' is an early drum & bass track because of the way it was layered: the sounds, the working of it. It's laid back but at the same time so danceable. We were really into imports at the time and he was the first English guy we got interested in. He kick-started the whole British scene so it's a very important track. He's so underrated." Also another English DJ, Tall Paul, named the song one of his Top 10 tracks in 1996, saying, "This was so different at the time. A massive groundbreaker — the girl, the chant and the way she sings."

In 2019, journalist Matt Anniss wrote that "Voodoo Ray" "may now be one of the most recognizable House records ever made, but the track has lost none of its charm or power." Anniss also opined that the four-track EP "has held up remarkably well," calling the additional tracks "similarly weighty, inspired and off kilter." In 2020, NME ranked it among "The 20 Best House Music Songs... Ever!". In 2022, Rolling Stone ranked "Voodoo Ray" number 55 in their "200 Greatest Dance Songs of All Time". In 2024, Classic Pop ranked it number five in their "Top 20 80s House Hits". In 2025, Billboard magazine ranked it number 23 in their list of "The 50 Best House Songs of All Time".

== Track listing ==
- 7" version
1. "Voodoo Ray (Radio Mix)" – 4:18
2. "Arcade Fantasy" – 4:43 (engineered by Adam Lesser)
- 12" and CD version
1. "Voodoo Ray" – 4:28
2. "Escape" – 5:16
3. "Rhapsody in Acid" – 5:23
4. "Blow Your House Down" – 5:03

== Charts ==
Chart (1989)	Peak position
Europe (Eurochart Hot 100)	41
Luxembourg (Radio Luxembourg)	10
UK Singles (OCC)	12

== In popular culture ==
The song is featured on the soundtrack of Michael Winterbottom's 2002 film 24 Hour Party People, which follows the history of Factory Records and the Madchester scene. The song is also featured on the fictional house radio station SF-UR in the 2004 video game Grand Theft Auto: San Andreas.

The song appears in Cheryl Dunye's 1991 film She Don't Fade.

A steelpan cover version was used in artist Jeremy Deller's work English Magic, which was displayed at the Venice Biennale in 2013.

== Personnel ==
- A Guy Called Gerald - writer, producer
- Chapter (Aniff Akinola and Colin Thorpe) - co-producers
- Lee Monteverde - engineer
- JA - mastering
- Nicola Collier - vocals
