= Rude & Rare: The Best of Derek and Clive =

Rude & Rare The Best of Derek and Clive

Greatest hits album by Derek and Clive
- Released: 2011
- Genre: Comedy
- Label: Virgin Records
- Producer: Peter Cook and Dudley Moore

Derek and Clive chronology
Derek and Clive Ad Nauseam (1978)	Rude & Rare The Best of Derek and Clive (2011)

Rude & Rare: The Best of Derek and Clive is a greatest hits album starring Peter Cook and Dudley Moore as their characters Derek and Clive. The collection contains two discs: the first featuring selected tracks from two of the previous three Derek and Clive albums (Derek and Clive Come Again and Derek and Clive Ad Nauseam). The second disc contains previously unreleased material.

== Track listing ==
All tracks by Peter Cook & Dudley Moore

=== Disc 1 ===
1. "Bruce Forsyth" – 0:43
2. "Celebrity Suicide" – 2:58
3. "Endangered Species" – 5:23
4. "Horse Racing" – 2:47
5. "Labels" – 3:10
6. "Mona" – 3:29
7. "Records" – 5:01
8. "The Horn" – 23:17
9. "Alfie Noakes" – 3:00
10. "Back of the Cab" – 6:22
11. "I Saw This Bloke" – 1:41
12. "In the Cubicles" – 5:15
13. "Joan Crawford" - 5:04
14. "Members Only" - 3:31
15. "Non Stop Dancer/My Mum Song (Medley)" - 5:36
16. "Norman the Carpet" - 1:37
17. "Nurse" - 0:48

=== Disc 2 ===
1. "Marriage" - 6:23
2. "Mother in Law" - 1:55
3. "Pete's Impressions" - 6:06
4. "How Sex Was Invented" - 2:00
5. "Bogey Song" - 1:35
6. "Eight Legged Elephant" - 2.16
7. "Dud's Walk" - 1:47
8. "Sex Education" - 3:29
9. "Drumming Session" - 3:21
10. "Punk Song" - 3:59
11. "Stripper" - 5:57
12. "Ballroom" - 1:51
13. "Cough Song" - 7:52
14. "Hamsters" - 2:40
15. "The End" - 1:05
