= Derek and Clive =

Double act of comedic characters created by Dudley Moore (Derek) and Peter Cook (Clive)

Derek and Clive was a character double act created by Dudley Moore (Derek) and Peter Cook (Clive) in the 1970s. The performances were captured on the records Derek and Clive (Live) (1976), Derek and Clive Come Again (1977), and Derek and Clive Ad Nauseam (1978), as well as in a film documentary, Derek and Clive Get the Horn (1979). The characters are foul-mouthed extensions of the earlier characters Pete and Dud. Upon release, more than 100,000 copies of Derek and Clive (Live) were sold in the United Kingdom.

A greatest hits album containing some previously unreleased material, called Rude & Rare: The Best of Derek and Clive, was released in 2011.

Considered highly offensive by many at the time, the sketches primarily took the form of bizarre, sometime drunken streams of consciousness led by Cook, with interjections from Moore. Memorable moments from the records include Clive claiming that the worst job he ever had was retrieving lobsters from Jayne Mansfield's arsehole, Derek claiming his worst job was cleaning up Winston Churchill's bogeys (leading the pair to conclude that the Titanic was one such bogey), Clive claiming that he was sexually aroused by the sight of a deceased Pope lying in state, Derek's account of a stranger accosting him and the ensuing profanity-laden conversation between them, followed by Clive's reminiscence of viciously assaulting a man who had said "Hello" to him at a football match, and a horse-racing 'commentary' featuring horses given the names of sexual organs, often in their vulgar forms.

Though the recordings were far too crude for a mainstream audience, Derek and Clive bootleg recordings circulated. They were mostly unscripted dialogues incorporating copious swearing – including frequent use of the word "cunt".

== Characters ==
The characters, supposedly two lavatory attendants (although in one sketch, 'Back of the Cab', they play the roles of two London taxi drivers) first surfaced in the mid-1970s.

== Development of the show ==
Cook and Moore were performing on Broadway with their revue show Good Evening, a live version of their television series Not Only... But Also. The relationship between the two men had become strained as a result of Cook's worsening alcoholism. To reassure Moore, Cook hired a recording studio in New York, where the two could simply relax, drink and ad-lib. The resulting recording was padded out with live performances of old favourites, such as "Bo Duddley", and began to circulate as Derek and Clive (Live).

Cook became bemused at the idea that they should not be making money from the increasing popularity of Derek and Clive, and suggested to Moore that the recording should be released officially. By this point, Moore had embarked on a successful Hollywood film career and found the tapes embarrassing, until he too realised his contemporaries were fans.

Two more records were made. They were less like dialogues and more like vindictive attacks on the increasingly successful Moore by Cook, whose career had stalled somewhat in comparison. One such merciless assault was in a cancer-themed diatribe when Cook was fully aware that Moore had recently lost his father to the disease. The same love-hate relationship between them is evident in the Derek and Clive Get the Horn movie.

It is often mistakenly assumed that all of their releases were recorded while under the influence of alcohol. While this can be presumed of "Come Again" – where the sounds of bottles can be heard in the background, featuring some tracks where both Cook and Moore are slurring their words – the home video release of Derek and Clive Get the Horn shows a very sober-looking Cook and Moore drinking coffee and water throughout. During the filming, a prank was played upon Cook and Moore by Richard Branson where 'police' arrive and suspiciously sniff the contents of an ash tray to the dismay of the unnerved and wary pair.

Later CD releases of Come Again and Ad Nauseam featured out-takes. Most were recorded during the Ad Nauseam sessions. Surreal at times, these included "Mother" – featured on Derek and Clive Get the Horn – where Cook pretends to visit his over-possessive and deranged mother, ending with Cook telling his mother to "shut your fucking face and die". "Valerie's Hymen," where Moore discussed cutting out his wife's hymen with a carving knife, and "Lady Vera Fart Teller", wherein Moore elaborates on a visit to a fortune teller who could tell his future by examining his farts.

Transcripts of further, unreleased, out-takes are available in a book titled Come Again, edited by William Cook and feature "General Eisenhower", where Cook reflects on the perils of counting the late General's dandruff flakes; "Vietnam", where Moore received a paper cut inflicted by the Viet Cong (in one insightful remark Cook mentions a "friend" of his who fought in Vietnam but he's not sure "on which side"), and "A Million Pounds", where Cook plays an hysterical woman trying to obtain a million pounds from a sympathetic Moore. The remaining unreleased out-takes are variations on actual releases.

The "Bo Duddley" sketch as it appears on Derek and Clive (Live) was sampled on the song "Voodoo Ray" by A Guy Called Gerald.

== Discography ==
=== Albums ===
- Derek and Clive (Live) (1976)
- Derek and Clive Come Again (1977)
- Derek and Clive Ad Nauseam (1978)

=== Compilation ===
- Rude & Rare: The Best of Derek and Clive (2011)

=== Videography ===
- Derek and Clive Get the Horn (1979, documentary)
