= Johnny Bassett =

British minister

John Bassett (born 1934) is the person credited with putting together the talent for the Edinburgh International Festival revue, Beyond the Fringe, in 1960.

== The beginnings ==
As a student at Wadham College, Oxford, John Bassett led a traditional jazz ensemble, called the Bassett Hounds. Fellow student Dudley Moore, attending Magdalen College, Oxford on an organ scholarship, played piano in Bassett's band. The band performed always on Saturday evenings and usually throughout the week in the Union cellars (a part of the Oxford Union buildings and grounds, which had just been opened by Michael Heseltine, at that time the Union President).

After graduating from Oxford, Bassett was hired by the artistic director of the Edinburgh International Festival Robert Ponsonby as his Assistant (on a salary of £11 a week). Ponsonby, himself a one-time Oxford man and organ scholar, was looking for a different type of late evening entertainment for the festival programme. For this time slot, he suggested to Bassett that they should put on their own revue "to beat The Fringe at its own game."

Bassett's had three initial choices for the revue. Firstly his Oxford bandmate, Dudley Moore, who was not only a brilliant musician in all disciplines, but had gained courage through performing with the band, and had become an outstanding cabaret performer. Through booking his band at a number of West End hotels, as well as the May and Commem Balls and various Deb Dances, Bassett had also brought forward Jonathan Miller for the occasional cabaret work (to boost his medical student salary) for what might be called 'a second time', as Jonathan had already made his comic mark while at Cambridge with The Footlights. Bassett knew Miller because Miller's wife had been at the same school (Bedales) as Bassett. Bassett had also organised a large number of gigs for Alan Bennett, who was at Exeter College, just up the road from Wadham, so much so that Alan had asked him to cut the number down, as he wanted to continue his post-graduate studies. Moore had already appeared on the Fringe in the 1958 Oxford revue. in turn, recommended him. Bassett booked Bennett after seeing him in a bit of cabaret. Miller welcomed the opportunity to join the venture, which was only envisaged to run a week at the Festival, as a way to make a bit of extra money, and escape the strains of medical work. But Miller turned out to be the talent scout for the last member to be recruited for the revue. He had seen this magical performer at what was called a "Footlights Smoker" an ad hoc performance where sketches are tried out before being publicly performed. The writer/performer was none other than the about-to-become legendary Peter Cook. In fact, he had already written for producer Michael Codron some sketches for a revue called, 'Pieces of Eight' and had followed that up by writing an entire revue called 'One over the Eight'. Cook would become the principal writer for the Edinburgh revue 'Beyond the Fringe'imbuing it with a sensibility, in Miller's words, "at right-angles" to all known comedy at the time.

== What ensued ==
The first meeting of the major talent selected for Ponsonby's challenge to The Fringe was tense, according to Bassett, with each participant not wanting to break the ice with a joke, in case the others didn't find it funny. The ice was finally broken when Moore did an imitation of Groucho Marx in the restaurant where they met. "He got up in this Italian restaurant and followed one of the waitresses through the swinging doors to the kitchen immediately coming out of the other swinging doors with another waitress." Bassett considered this moment the contributors relaxed and realised the whole idea of Beyond the Fringe would work.

It is possible that the Festival's finances rather than the talent of the four, were the driving force behind the formation of the revue. Louis Armstrong had been booked in the time slot eventually allotted to the revue. Unfortunately, Armstrong's agent could not keep to the commitment having failed to book other gigs in the UK due to Musician's Union pressure, and therefore could not justify the trip to Edinburgh. This cancellation forced Ponsonby's decision to put together the revue at the last minute.

== Beyond Beyond the Fringe ==
By the time Beyond the Fringe opened in London, Bassett had been 'rowed out' by Cook's Agent (Donald Langdon) and was no longer fully involved. However, he went to the States for the Broadway opening, and kept in touch with all four, right up to the deaths of Cook and Moore, writing monthly to him in the States until his death in 2002. Bassett is still in tenuous touch with Alan Bennett and Jonathan Miller.

Bassett was also involved as an Assistant Producer in the television programs, That Was the Week That Was and Late Night Line-Up, and subsequently discovered Eric Chappell (author of Rising Damp, Only when I laugh, Duty Free, and many others) who till that time had been an Internal Audit Clerk for East Midlands Electricity.

== La Belle Aventure – John Bassett's hotel barge in France ==
Following his television career, John went on to run a hotel barge on the canals of Burgundy in France. In the early 1990s John bought the Dutch barge 'La Belle Aventure' which he successfully ran for several years. John is a natural story teller, which coupled with his entertaining character and amusing collection of stories from his days in the theatre and TV, ensured that passengers were always well entertained; John was always popular with his largely American clientele on the barge. A perfect command of French and an effortless charm (particularly with the lady lock-keepers) ensured that John was also always popular on the canals of Burgundy. John was welcomed from one season to the next by the many and varied characters alongside his routes through France on the barge.

La Belle Aventure was an 85 foot long Dutch barge, built in the early years of the 19th century, originally for carrying cargo on the waterways of Holland and Belgium. The barge was converted, before John's ownership of her, to carry up to eight passengers. John's approach was to appeal to all ages, but at the more 'mid-market' end of barging holidays. Rather than compete with the luxurious all-inclusive end of the barge holiday market, John actively appealed to families with children, carrying a sailing dinghy and children bicycles on board. Accommodation on board was very comfortable, with two bathrooms and three separate double cabins and occasional accommodation in the salon, with crew accommodation in the aft cabin and wheelhouse. Breakfast and lunch were served on board, with dinner being taken in a canal side restaurant or auberge. John ran a minibus alongside the barge, in order to take passengers out to sites of interest along the route – John had an excellent knowledge of the chateaux of Burgundy and the history of the region.

The canals that John travelled with the barge were the primarily the Canal de Bourgogne and the Canal du Nivernais, both much loved by him for their bucolic beauty and rural charm. The final season for La Belle Aventure saw her move slowly down the length of France from a freezing Amsterdam in early spring 1996 to the baking heat of the Mediterranean by July and then inland, almost to Bordeaux. Sadly, due to ill health, John didn't complete the final season on the barge down to the Mediterranean, and at the end of 1996 La Belle Aventure was sold. A short, but delightful chapter in John Bassett's rich and varied life.

== Bibliography ==
- Carpenter, Humphrey (2002) A Great, Silly Grin: The British Satire Boom of the 1960s, New York: Public Affairs, ISBN 1-58648-081-2
