= The Dudley Moore Trio =

Studio album by The Dudley Moore Trio
- Released: 1969
- Recorded: 1969
- Genre: Jazz
- Label: Decca

The Dudley Moore Trio is a 1969 jazz album, the fifth LP recorded by the British jazz trio led by musician, composer, actor and comedian Dudley Moore. It was released in 1969 on Decca Records in the UK and Australia, and on London Records in the United States.

The album is the first set Moore recorded containing solely original material. Bassist Jeff Clyne replaced Moore's long-time sidekick Pete McGurk, who had committed suicide in June 1968. According to Richard Morton Jack, "[Moore's] trademark humour comes through, but so does a newfound introspection and emotional intensity, perhaps informed by the tragedy of losing McGurk". Chris Karan remained on drums, improvising on tabla in "Bag of Chris". "Folk Song" is for solo piano.

In the liner notes, Moore made the following comments about specific tracks:

"Amalgam" is a long slow melody with a staccato and brittle accompaniment with me singing quietly behind. "Romantic Notion" is a nostalgic bossa nova, while "Pop and Circumstance" is one of the Trio's first excursions into a vaguely pop idiom. "Love song from an imaginary musical" provides the excuse for an unabashedly sentimental balled.

In 2015 John Lewis, writing in The Guardian, selected the track "Amalgam" as one of Moore's "10 best piano pieces" and wrote:

This sprightly, morning-fresh piece of continental minimalism – reminiscent of 21st century sampladelic acts such as Koop – has been slowed down and sampled by several European hip hop acts. Another cracking track from the same LP is "Pop and Circumstance", a set of tangled, Bach-like chord changes over a rock beat.

== Personnel ==
=== Musicians ===
- Dudley Moore – piano
- Jeff Clyne – bass
- Chris Karan – drums

=== Technical ===
- George Chkiantz – recording engineer

== Track listing ==
1. "Fanfare"
2. "120 - plus optional magic exploding cadence"
3. "Chimes"
4. "Love song from an imaginary musical"
5. "Bag of Chris"
6. "Pop and circumstance"
7. "Romantic notion"
8. "Folk song" (solo piano)
9. "Amalgam"
10. "Nursery tune"
11. "Hymn"

== Release details ==
- Decca Records LK 4976 (UK), 1969 (mono)
- Decca Records SKLA 4976 (Australia), 1969
