= Goodbye Again (TV series) =

1968 British television series

Peter Cook and Dudley Moore on the DVD cover for Goodbye Again

Goodbye Again is a 1968 series of four hour-long television programmes made by ATV for the British TV network ITV to re-unite Peter Cook and Dudley Moore and recreate their very successful BBC comedy series Not Only... But Also.

The head of ATV, Lew Grade, offered Cook and Moore a lucrative contract and the opportunity for network exposure in the USA. Whilst earlier attempts by the BBC to make another show with the duo had been turned down, they accepted Grade's offer with its promise of a larger production budget. Four shows were recorded, three in April/May 1968 and the fourth a year later. They were aired in the USA under the Kraft Music Hall Presents banner in 1969, in colour, as two episodes with different linking material.

An LP was produced of selections from the series.

A two-hour compilation of material from the four shows was released on DVD in 2005 under the title The Very Best of Goodbye Again. Except sketches recorded outside on film, all other original material is presented in black and white. The show was originally produced in colour and a colour clip was used as late as 1981 in an ITV Central documentary called Closed circuit (The Elstree Story).

== Episodes ==
(All four extant, though not in their original colour - with the exception of filmed inserts)

Show 1, TX 18 August 1968 Music: Ike & Tina Turner, Donovan

Show 2, TX 24 August 1968 Music: Traffic, Julie Driscoll & Brian Auger and the Trinity

Show 3, TX 14 September 1968 Music: Georgie Fame, Selena Jones

Show 4, TX 3 August 1969 Music: Mel Torme
