= 28 Gun Bad Boy =

Studio album by A Guy Called Gerald
- Released: 1993
- Studio: Machine Room Studio (Manchester, England)
- Genre: Breakbeat hardcore; oldschool jungle
- Length: 62:56
- Label: Juice Box
- Producer: Gerald Simpson

A Guy Called Gerald chronology
Automannik (1990)	28 Gun Bad Boy (1993)	Black Secret Technology (1995)

Singles from 28 Gun Bad Boy
- 1. "Forever Changing" Released: 1992

Professional ratings
Review scores
Source	Rating
Select	2/5 stars
AllMusic	2.5/5 stars

28 Gun Bad Boy is the third album by house music and drum and bass pioneer A Guy Called Gerald, released in 1993 through his own Juice Box Records imprint. The album is often credited as one of the first full-length drum and bass albums, and its influence has been noted to have "brought the jungle movement out of the rave era." The track "28 Gun Bad Boy" is seen as one of the first examples of drum and bass/oldschool jungle music.

== Production ==
The album was produced at the Machine Room Studio, a recording studio in the city centre of Manchester. Electronic equipment used for the album's production include two Akai S950 samplers, an Akai MPC60 sequencer, Soundtracs Quartz 32-channel in-line mixing desk, Atari tape machine, Lexicon reverb, Lexicon delay, two Yamaha SBX90s, microphones, and an Atari ST running Cubase. "Disneyband" also used the sounds of a Roland JD-800 digital synthesizer. According to Simpson, the album's sound was the result of him attempting to progress from his early style as well as the Rave scene of the early 1990s.

The central concept behind the album was to be produced similar to that of a mixtape, which has been inspired by live DJ sets according to Simpson. The album was released through Juice Box Records, an independent label ran by Simpson as a result of his strained relationship with Sony Music, more specifically, their refusal to release Simpson's High Life, Low Profile album which was recorded in 1991 as the follow-up to Automanikk.

== Track listing ==
No.	Title	Length
1.	"Mix" (Cops/Anything/28 Gun Bad Boy/Sunshine/Like a Drug/Ses Makes You Wise/Free Africa/King of the Jungle)	17:46
2.	"Money Honey"	4:55
3.	"Got a Feeling"	4:48
4.	"Universe 2000"	5:23
5.	"The Track"	5:09
6.	"Forever Changing"	5:40
7.	"28 Gun Bad Boy"	3:38
8.	"The Freak Inside"	5:19
9.	"Disneyband"	5:02
10.	"Wonderful World"	5:16
