= Essence (A Guy Called Gerald album) =

Studio album by A Guy Called Gerald
- Released: August 14, 2000
- Recorded: 1996–1999
- Genre: Drum and bass
- Length: 53:15
- Label: Studio !K7
- Producer: Gerald Simpson

A Guy Called Gerald chronology
Black Secret Technology (1995)	Essence (2000)	To All Things What They Need (2004)

Singles from Essnece
- 1. "Humanity" Released: July 10, 2000; 2. "Fever (or a Flame)" Released: October 30, 2000

Professional ratings
Aggregate scores
Source	Rating
Metacritic	76/100
Review scores
Source	Rating
AllMusic	3/5 stars
Pitchfork	5.6/10
Slant Magazine	3/5 stars
SPIN	8/10 stars

Essence is the fifth studio album by electronic producer A Guy Called Gerald, which was released on August 14, 2000, through Studio !K7. The album, which initially was intended to be released as Aquarius Rising, is noted for its usage of vocals, something rarely utilized in his previous recordings. According to Gerald Simpson, the album is an attempt for him to focus on melody and songwriting compared to his previous album Black Secret Technology.

== Background and production ==
Production for the album began in 1996, and was originally intended to be issued through Simpson's personal Juice Box Records imprint under the title Aquarius Rising. In 1997, Simpson signed onto Island Records and the album was then planned to be issued through them, this however would change as the label's parent company, PolyGram Records, went through a change in chairman and President, which caused artists such as Simpson to be dropped.

Simpson has described the production for the album to be "therapeutic", as it helped him deal with his decision to leave behind Juice Box Records.

By 1998, Simpson moved out to the United States of America, where work recommenced on the album. By this point, Simpson was signed onto Studio !K7, an independent label from Germany which also has an office in New York City, where Simpson was living at the time. During this later stage of production, the album's title would be changed to Essence as Simpson felt it better described how he felt of the tracks being "living entities" that possessed the illusion of obtaining the "essence of life"

== Track listing ==
All tracks are written by Gerald Simpson.

No.	Title	Length
1.	"The Universe" (featuring Jennifer Neal)	0:52
2.	"The First Breath"	4:42
3.	"Humanity" (featuring Louise Rhodes)	5:04
4.	"Multiples" (featuring Wendy Page)	3:15
5.	"Fever (or a Flame)" (featuring Wendy Page)	5:04
6.	"Could You Understand" (featuring David Simpson)	3:27
7.	"Alien Report" (featuring Public Domain)	0:20
8.	"Glow" (featuring Wendy Page)	4:40
9.	"Beaches and Deserts" (featuring Wendy Page)	4:04
10.	"Final Call"	3:32
11.	"I Make It" (featuring David Simpson)	4:22
12.	"Universal Spirit" (featuring Wendy Page)	5:11
13.	"Hurry To Go Easy" (featuring Lady Kier)	3:45
14.	"Scale Circle"	0:45
15.	"Landed" (featuring Wendy Page)	4:31

== Personnel ==
- Gerald Simpson – production, music, writing
- Jennifer Neal – spoken word on "The Universe"
- Louise Rhodes – vocals
- Wendy Page – vocals
- David Simpson – vocals
- Lady Kier – vocals
- Rainer Hosch – photography
- Gary St. Clare – design
- David Calderley – design
- ZG Management – management
