= Not Only... But Also =

British TV sketch comedy show (1965–1970)

- Peter Cook and Dudley Moore
- Genre: Comedy
- Written by: Peter Cook; Dudley Moore
- Starring: Peter Cook; Dudley Moore
- Country of origin: United Kingdom
- Original language: English
- No. of series: 3
- No. of episodes: 24

Production
- Executive producers: Dick Clement; Joe McGrath; Jimmy Gilbert; John Street
- Running time: 45 minutes (series 1 & 3), 30 minutes (series 2 & Australian specials), 47 minutes (1966 Christmas Special)

Original release
- Network: BBC2
- Release: 9 January 1965 – 24 December 1970

Not Only... But Also is a BBC British sketch comedy show starring Peter Cook and Dudley Moore that aired in three series between 1965 and 1970.

== History ==
The show was originally intended as a solo project for Moore, called Not Only Dudley Moore, But Also His Guests. However, unsure about going it alone, Moore invited his partner from Beyond the Fringe, Peter Cook, to guest in the pilot (along with Diahann Carroll and John Lennon, who was to make two more appearances during the course of the series). So well received by the studio audience was their double act, in particular the first "Dagenham Dialogue", "A Spot of the Usual Trouble", that Cook was invited to become a permanent fixture and the show became Not Only Peter Cook and Dudley Moore, But Also Their Guests, though it was only ever really referred to as Not Only... But Also.... This somewhat cumbersome title was later referred to by Cook in an interview as "another of Dudley's plodding ideas".

Three series were made: the first, airing from January to April 1965 (produced and directed by Joe McGrath); the second, from January to February 1966 (produced and directed by Dick Clement); and the third, from February to May 1970 (produced and directed by Jimmy Gilbert). John Street produced the (surviving) 1966 Boxing Day Special.

The opening titles for series one often featured Moore playing the theme tune that he had composed (later released on the B-side of the 1965 "Goodbyee" single) in a variety of unusual locations, such as in a car wash, on a violin at a Gypsy cafe, and as a one-man band.

For the second series, Cook and Moore developed material by improvising conversations which Clement recorded on tape and had transcribed, before the pair edited the transcripts into scripts. The series also featured elaborate filmed opening sequences. For the first episode Cook and Moore performed at a grand piano while being lowered by a crane from a freighter into the Thames near Tower Bridge, the apparent continuation underwater shot was filmed separately in a swimming pool. These opening sequences usually led to revealing the words "NOT ONLY... BUT ALSO..." in huge letters placed in obscure places (for example, the aircraft carrier Ark Royal).

Every edition except (possibly) the pilot concluded with a performance of arguably Moore's best known composition, "Goodbyee", sometimes involving the guest star of that particular episode. Examples include Cilla Black crying "Oh, kiss me, Peter!" during the song's intro in series two episode one, and Peter Sellers accompanying the duo on timpani in series one episode six.

Among the best known features of the show were the "Dagenham Dialogues" between Pete and Dud, which were rambling, surreal conversations running often for over ten minutes and regular appearances by Cook's oblivious upperclass gent, Sir Arthur Streeb-Greebling. Other well-known sketches include the "Facts of Life" sketch ("A Bit of a Chat"), "The Leaping Nuns of the Order of St Beryl", "Superthunderstingcar" (a parody of Thunderbirds and other Sylvia and Gerry Anderson puppet shows), and the "rhythmic voodoo" R&B singer Bo Dudley – though the fame of these almost certainly owes much to the fact they still exist in vision, unlike much of the series.

Contrary to popular myth, the Cook perennial "One Leg Too Few", a classic sketch about a one-legged actor applying for the role of Tarzan, which had been written by Cook when he was 18 years old and used in Beyond the Fringe, never appeared on the BBC Not Only... But Also..., although it did feature in one of the Australian shows in 1971.

The series – in particular the "Pete and Dud" segments – allowed Cook the chance to adlib and both, but most famously Moore, were often reduced to helpless laughter, or "corpsing". Cook made a habit of trying to crack Moore up in the middle of their dialogues, occasionally forcing himself to corpse in the process.

Between the second and third series, the two men made a series for ATV called Goodbye Again (director Shaun Riordan), which was very similar up to the point of using the same music and reusing some sketches like "Alan-a-Dale". Shows lasted an hour and were edited more heavily. Unlike those of Not Only ... But Also..., all the tapes survive, although only in black and white. The show was originally recorded in colour (some sketches prerecorded on film still exist in colour).

The BBC wiped most editions of Not Only... But Also... in the late 1960s and early 1970s, as it did with many other programmes in this era. Cook and Moore even offered to pay for the cost of preservation and buy new videotapes so that the old tapes would not need to be reused, but this offer was rejected. Some telerecordings of the black and white episodes survive, but as the completed videotapes of the colour series were wiped, the only surviving colour sketches are the 16mm film inserts. In 2010 it was announced that off-air audio recordings for at least part of all the episodes had been recovered, and that there were plans to make them available, although this has yet to happen. A 2016 documentary by Victor Lewis-Smith, "The Undiscovered Peter Cook", featured first series extracts from "Sir Arthur at the Tailor", long known to exist, and the final minute and 25 seconds of "Pete and Dud on the Bus", being reconstituted from film footage newly recovered from the Australian Broadcasting Corporation trailer department. Peter Cook and Dudley Moore: The Missing Sketches, transmitted on New Year's Day 2017, included further ABC trailer extracts from 'Pete and Dud - Diseases' and 'Pete and Dud – Sex'. One remaining recovered clip, lasting one minute and 25 seconds, of 'Pete and Dud – Music' remains unscreened to date.

A 1971 visit to Australia for the live show Behind the Fridge (the name was a pun on Beyond the Fringe) saw Cook and Moore record two half-hour Not Only... But Also... specials for Australian television. These two episodes also survive intact, as do specially filmed performances of the Behind the Fridge live show from Australia and London, the latter in colour. The Australian performance has been available on DVD. Although they have since been viewed as "best-of"s (featuring new versions of "One Leg Too Few", "Shirt Shop" and "Pseudolene/Job Offer"), at least half of the material was new.

A number of surviving sequences were compiled into The Best of Not Only...But Also, screened by BBC2 on 24 December 1974. Cook and Moore persuaded the BBC (in part thanks to a pleading letter from Cook's elderly mother) to piece together six half-hour compilation shows, screened on BBC2 from 4 November to 9 December 1990 as The Best of What's Left of Not Only... But Also... and released in 100-minute compilation form under the same title on VHS. In 2003 a 98-minute Region 2 DVD compilation of surviving sketches was released as The Best of Peter Cook & Dudley Moore; this is the same as the previous video tape but missing the third series' opening sequence, "Tower Bridge". At least one sketch substitution appears to have occurred between domestic and international versions of the compilation shows, the latter of which included "The Walrus and the Carpenter" (a filmed recreation of the Lewis Carroll poem which survives from the largely missing sixth episode of series two) instead of "The Ravens". Neither DVD includes this sequence. "Initials", or "Old J.J.", an old piece of Cook's recorded for the NOBA pilot in November 1964 and screened in January 1965 in the first episode of the series proper, was included in a mid-1990s VHS compilation of 1960s BBC comedy extracts.

A Region 1 DVD of The Best of... What's Left of... Not Only... But Also... was released by BBC Worldwide on 9 September 2008, featuring all six compilation episodes. This still leaves over half the extant material unreleased in any form.

== Episodes ==
(italics denotes surviving visual material; audio for all episodes exists, an * marks a sketch's soundtrack survives on officially released record album)

=== First series (1965) black and white ===
(Five episodes extant, two missing)

- Pilot: Rec. 29 November 1964 — (John Lennon, Norman Rossington) — Initials/Painting on Television/The Ravens*/Good Dog Nigel/Pete and Dud – A Spot of the Usual Trouble (AKA Film Stars)/Deaf Ted, Danoota and Me. Music: Diahann Carroll (Humdrum Blues, Brown Baby, Blues in the Night), Dudley Moore Trio (Swingles Theme, Grwmst, Just in Time)
1. TX 9 January 1965 — (John Lennon, Norman Rossington) — Car Wash Opening/Initials/The Ravens*/Good Dog Nigel/Deaf Ted, Danoota and Me. Music: Diahann Carroll (Humdrum Blues, Brown Baby, Blues in the Night), Dudley Moore Trio (Swingles Theme, Grwmst, Just in Time)
2. TX 23 January 1965 — (Barry Humphries, Roddy Maude-Roxby) — One-Man Band Opening/Silent Film extract/Tarquin Mordente – Silent Film Producer/Painting on Television/Roddy Maude-Roxbury monologue/Guide to the North Circular/Pete and Dud – A Spot of the Usual Trouble/Striptease. Music: Goldie & The Gingerbreads ("Can't You Hear My Heartbeat"), Dudley Moore Trio (I Won't Dance), Dudley and Orchestra (Got a Lot of Livin' to Do)
3. TX 6 February 1965 — (Joe Melia, Bill Wallis, John Wells) — Cinema Opening/Sir Arthur at the Tailor/The Great War/Pete and Dud – The Worst Thing in the World/Alan A’Dale/Words to the Opening Theme. Music: June Christy (You Came a Long Way from St Louis, Just in Time, Remind Me, My Shining Hour), Dudley Moore Trio (My Blue Heaven)
4. TX 20 February 1965 — (Barry Humphries, Anna Quayle) — Gypsy Violinist Opening/Tramponuns/Tramponuns Film/Anna Quayle Monologue/Prospective Son-In-Law/Incidents in the Life of My Uncle Arly/Pete and Dud – Art Gallery. Music: Marion Montgomery (The Exciting Mr Fitch, Wasn't the Summer Short?, Close Your Eyes), Dudley Moore Trio (Indiana)
5. TX 6 March 1965 — (Mel Torme) — London Bus Opening (exists as silent film sequence)/Pete and Dud – On the Bus/Canvassing Dracula (exists as silent film sequence)/Job Offer (possibly remade as "Pseudolene" for the second Australian NOBA in 1971)/Privates Cigarettes Advertising (exists as silent film sequence)/Betting Agent. Music: Mel Torme (Limehouse Blues, My One and Only Highland Fling/Dat Dere Daddy)
6. TX 20 March 1965 — (Peter Sellers) — Doomed Pilots Opening/Boxer-Cum-Painter/Pete and Dud – Superstitions/The Gourmets. Music: T-Bone Walker (Hey Baby, Goodbye Baby), Dudley Moore Trio (I Love You Samantha)
7. TX 3 April 1965 — (Eric Sykes, John Bluthal) — The Grand Order of the Bull/Pete and Dud – Religions*/Making of a B-Movie/Ballroom Dancing Competition. Music: Blossom Dearie (I Wish You Love), Dudley Moore Trio (Baubles Bangles & Beads)

=== Second series (1966) black and white ===
(Two episodes extant, five missing)

1. TX 15 January 1966 — (Henry Cooper, Terry Downes) — Underwater Pianist Opening/At the Zoo/Fight of the Century/A Bit of a Chat. Music: Cilla Black (Let There Be Love)
2. TX 22 January 1966 — (Alan Freeman) — Scottish ("Curse of the McLooneys") Opening/Pete And Dud – Diseases/The Most Boring Man in the World Competition/Interview with the Most Boring Man in the World/Six of the Best*. Music: Dakota Staton (High on a Windy Valley, Morning Glory)
3. TX 29 January 1966 — Court Jester Opening/Italian Restaurant/Ol' Man River (originally shot for 1.5, later remade for London run of Behind the Fridge. That version was included in the 1990 repeat series)/Blue Movie/Pete and Dud – Music. Music: Blossom Dearie (You Turn Me on Baby), Dudley Moore Trio (Softly As in the Morning Rise)
4. TX 5 February 1966 — Pete and Dud at the Seaside Opening/The Frog And Peach*/Commercials/Slapstick Comedy. Music: Emil Lancey (If I Were A Bell, Rainy Day), Cook and Moore (Isn't She A Sweetie)
5. TX 12 February 1966 — Monk Opening/The Psychiatrist*/The Epic That Never Was/Father And Son*. Music: Dionne Warwick ("Walk On By", Unchained Melody)
6. TX 19 February 1966 — Student Prince (Drinking Song) Opening/The Music Teacher*/The Walrus and the Carpenter/Pete And Dud – Sex*. Music: Dudley Moore Trio (Summertime), Dusty Springfield (Wives And Lovers)
7. TX 26 February 1966 — Caveman Opening/Bo Dudley/Superthunderstingcar/Pete and Dud – In Heaven. Music: Marion Montgomery

=== Christmas special: TX 26 December 1966 ===
The 1966 Christmas Special survives in a slightly abridged copy: it was transmitted in a 50-minute slot, but the circulating print (and that held by the BBC) is four minutes shorter. Reference to the studio shooting script reveals the excised material to be a section of "The Fairy Cobbler" as well as an entire filmed sketch referred to as "Golf Quickie". (John Lennon) Fox Hunt Opening/Fairy Cobbler/Pete and Dud – The Unexplained/Swinging London (Lionel Bloab – Destructive Artist, Rev. Gavin Thistle, Penny Ryder, Simon Accrington, "The L.S. Bumblebee", The Ad Lav Club) Music: Marion Montgomery ("I'll Be Tired of You", "I’m Old Fashioned"), Dudley Moore Trio

- The 15-minute "Swinging London" segment was partly filmed in Soho in November 1966. Purporting to be an episode of The Pipesucker Report, with Cook playing investigative reporter Hiram J. Pipesucker, the sketch satirises the American media's coverage of the Swinging London phenomenon. Cook and Moore poke fun at London's burgeoning creative scenes, such as performance art, fashion modelling and pop music. As Simon Accrington, Moore plays the manager of a pop group that have become devotees of Chinese banjo player Ravi Oli (a send-up of The Beatles guitarist George Harrison travelling to India to study the sitar with Indian classical musician Ravi Shankar). The band, with Cook and Moore as vocalists, are shown recording a new single, "The L.S. Bumblebee" – the lyrics and exotic musical effects of which parody the Beatles' recent experimental song "Tomorrow Never Knows". At the end of the sketch, Pipesucker attempts to gain entry into the Ad Lav Club, which he describes as "London's most fashionable lavatory spot ... [where] film stars rub shoulders with royalty". In a parody of the exclusive door policy at London's Ad Lib nightclub, the doorman (played by John Lennon) grants Pipesucker access only when the reporter persuades him that he is the Duke and Duchess of Windsor.

=== Series three (1970) colour ===
(All episodes missing; most film sequences survive)

1. TX 18 February 1970 — Tower Bridge Opening/Pete and Dud – The Wardrobe (Dud Dreams)*/Piano Tuner/Bargo/Poets Cornered with Spike Milligan. Music: Nanette Workman, Dudley Moore Trio, Spike Milligan (On the Ning Nang Nong)
2. TX 4 March 1970 — Lavatory Humour Opening/Scriptwriter/The Glidd of Glood/Pete and Dud – 0-0-Dud*/Poets Cornered with Willie Rushton. Music: Nanette, Dudley Moore Trio, Joe Cocker & The Grease Band
3. TX 18 March 1970 — Railway Station Opening/Sir Arthur's World of Worms/Pete and Dud – Racial Prejudice/In the Club*/Poets Cornered with Barry Humphries. Music: Nanette; Dudley Moore Trio; Michael Chapman
4. TX 1 April 1970 — Not Only… But Psycho Opening/Pete and Dud – The Futility of Life/Permission to Marry/Good vs. Evil Cricket Match/Poets Cornered with Frank Muir. Music: Nanette; Dudley Moore Trio; Alan Price
5. TX 15 April 1970 — Flowers Opening/Sir Arthur on Flowers/Geriatric Medicine (Undercover Doctor)/Pete and Dud – Heaving Thighs Across Manhattan/Ludwig! (film sections survive – two lengthy studio-based "chat show" sections missing. There is also a fake ad, still extant, which has not been released or repeated)/Poets Cornered with Ronnie Barker. Music: Nanette; Dudley Moore Trio ("Lillian Lust"); Yes
6. TX 29 April 1970 — Newspaper Opening/Lengths*/The Conman/Pete and Dud – As Nature Intended/Poets Cornered with Denis Norden. Music: Nanette; Dudley Moore Trio; Arrival
7. TX 13 May 1970 — Birmingham-Mandalay Cycle Race/The Lunch Party/Pete and Dud – Self-Improvement/The Making of a Movie/Poets Cornered with Alan Bennett. Music: Nanette; Dudley Moore Trio; John Williams

=== Off-air audio ===
Audio recordings for all of the lost episodes of the series exist, thanks to off-air audio recordings made by viewers at the time of transmission. Some of these audio recordings are more complete than others. Very few of them are completely unedited. This means that although we have an audio recording for every episode, some parts of some of those episodes still remain lost. A complete collection of these recordings is housed in the National Sound Archive at the British Library in London.

Further off-air recordings have since also been recovered, mostly from Australia; though some of the recordings are abridged. A confirmed list of these Australian findings (including some material not held at the British Library) include:

- Series 1, Show 5: TX 6 March 1965: Pete and Dud – On the Bus
- Series 1, Show 7: TX 3 April 1965 (feat Eric Sykes): The Grand Order of the Bull/Pete and Dud – Religions/Making of a B-Movie/Outro and Goodbyee (partial)
- Series 2, Show 2: TX 22 January 1966: Pete and Dud - On Diseases
- Series 2, Show 4: TX 5 February 1966: Pete and Dud at the Seaside Opening/Piers and Dominic Intro (possibly partial)/The Frog And Peach*/Isn't She a Sweetie (Piers and Dominic song)/Commercials/Slapstick Comedy/Goodbyee
- Series 2, Show 5: TX 12 February 1966: Monk Opening/"Brother" Piers and "Brother" Dominic Intro/The Psychiatrist*/The Epic That Never Was/Father And Son*/Goodbyee
- Series 3, Show 1: TX 18 February 1970: Piano Tuner/Spike Milligan (On the Ning Nang Nong)/Poets Cornered with Spike Milligan
- Series 3, Show 2: TX 4 March 1970: The Scriptwriter
- Series 3, Show 3: TX 18 March 1970: Railway Station Opening/Sir Arthur's World of Worms/Pete and Dud – Racial Prejudice/Poets Cornered with Barry Humphries
- Series 3, Show 4: TX 1 April 1970: Pete and Dud – The Futility of Life/Permission to Marry
- Series 3, Show 5: TX 15 April 1970: Flowers Opening/Sir Arthur on Flowers/Geriatric Medicine (Undercover Doctor)/Pete and Dud – Heaving Thighs Across Manhattan/Ludwig!/Poets Cornered with Ronnie Barker
- Series 3, Show 6: TX 29 April 1970: The Conman/Pete and Dud – As Nature Intended
- Series 3, Show 7: TX 13 May 1970: The Lunch Party/Pete and Dud – Self-Improvement/Poets Cornered with Alan Bennett

== The Best Of What's Left Of Not Only... But Also... ==
In 1990 much of the surviving material was compiled into 6 30-minute episodes under the name The Best Of What's Left Of Not Only... But Also.... A VHS release of the same name, though containing somewhat different material, including a new Pete and Dud dialogue, was released at the same time.

== Other media ==
Four compilation albums were released by Decca Records to accompany the series, taken from the original television recordings:

- Not Only Peter Cook... But Also Dudley Moore (1965) - sketches include "The Ravens", "Superstitions", "Tramponuns", "Art Gallery", "Initials", "Religions"
- Once Moore with Cook (1966) - sketches include "Dud and Pete on Sex", "Father and Son", "The Frog and Peach", "Six of the Best", "The Music Teacher", "A Bit of a Chat", "Dud and Pete at the Zoo", "The Psychiatrist"
- Not Only But Also (1971) - sketches include "Dud's Dreams" [sic], "In the Club", "Lengths", "This is Ludwig Van Beethoven", "The Making of a Movie", "0-0 Dud"
- The World of Pete & Dud (1974) - sketches include "Art Gallery", "A Bit of a Chat", "Lengths", "The Psychiatrist", "Dud Dreams", "The Ravens", "Father and Son", "Six of the Best"

The scripts of 12 of the 29 "Dagenham Dialogues" (most, but not all, from Not Only ... But Also...) were published in a book of that title by Methuen in 1971 (reissued 1988).

== See also ==
- Goodbye Again (TV series)
