= Beyond the Fringe =

1960s British comedy revue/play

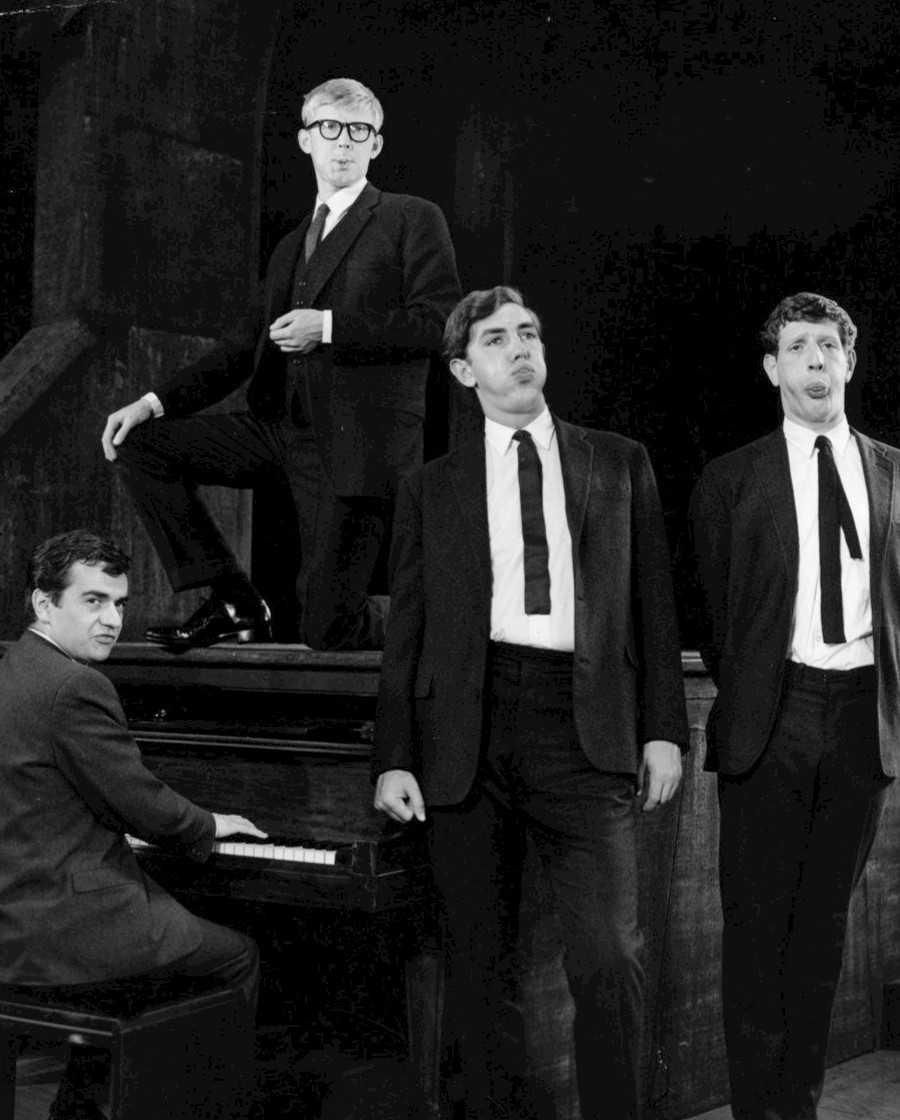
- On Broadway circa 1963 From left, Dudley Moore, Alan Bennett, Peter Cook, Jonathan Miller.
- Original language: English
- Written by: Alan Bennett; Peter Cook; Jonathan Miller; Dudley Moore
- Genre: Revue

Premiere
- Date: 22 August 1960
- Place: Royal Lyceum Theatre, Edinburgh

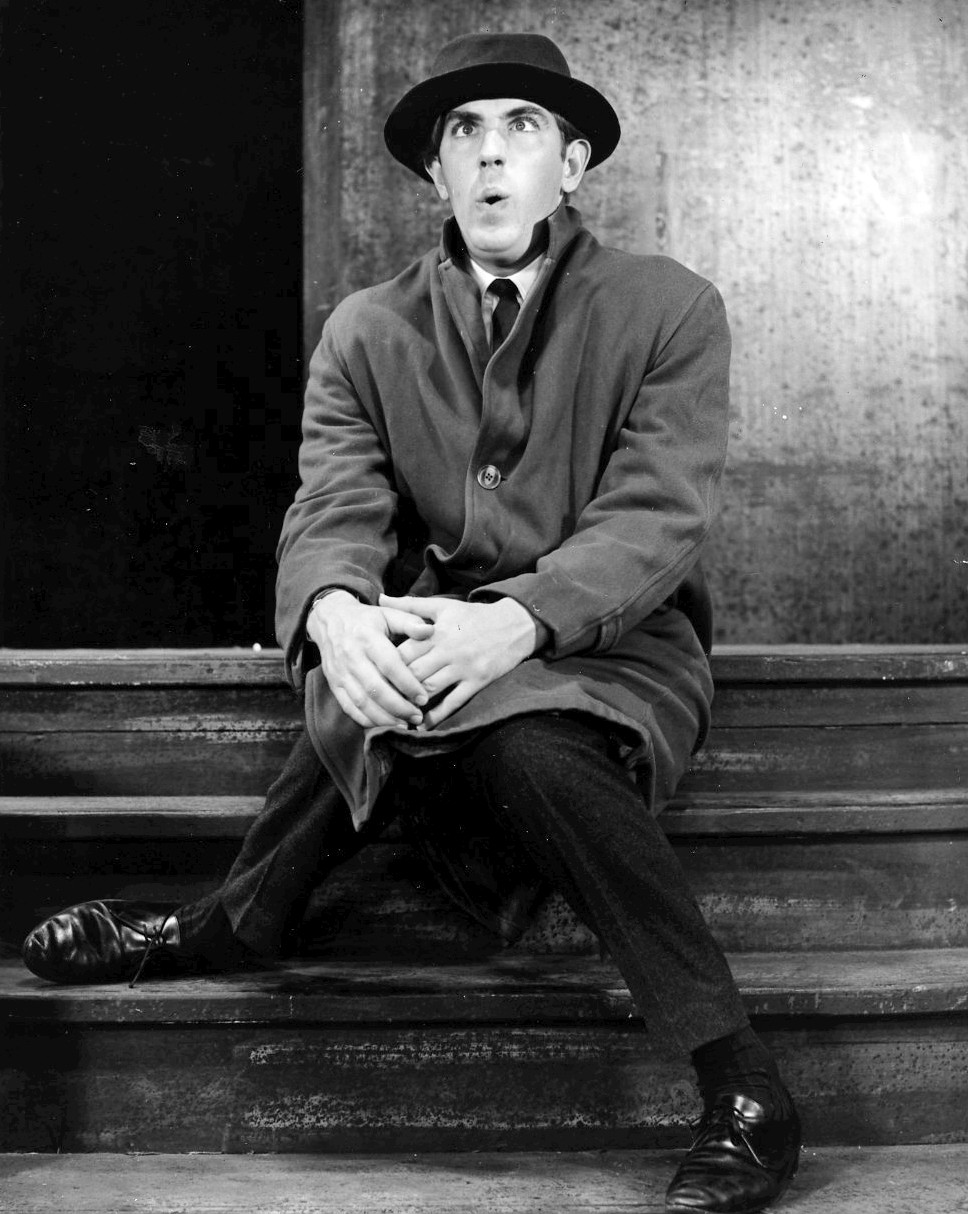
Peter Cook

Beyond the Fringe is a British comedy stage revue written and performed by Alan Bennett, Peter Cook, Jonathan Miller and Dudley Moore. It debuted at the 1960 Edinburgh Festival and went on to play in London's West End and then in America, both on tour and on New York's Broadway in the early 1960s. Hugely successful, it is widely regarded as central to the "satire boom", the rise of satirical comedy in 1960s Britain.

== Show ==
The idea for Beyond the Fringe came from Robert Ponsonby, who was the director of the Edinburgh International Festival from 1956 to 1960. Ponsonby's idea was to bring together the best parts of the revues staged by the Cambridge Footlights and The Oxford Revue at the Edinburgh Fringe in previous years. He said that the festival should put on a late-night revue "to beat The Fringe at its own game". By 1960, the festival was so firmly established that "it required for its health some good-humoured self-mockery".

Ponsonby's assistant, Johnny Bassett, recommended Dudley Moore, who had played with Bassett in a jazz band while at university in Oxford. Moore in turn recommended Alan Bennett, who had had a hit at the Fringe a few years earlier. Bassett also chose Jonathan Miller, who had been a Footlights star in 1957. Miller recommended Cook.

Bennett and Miller were already pursuing careers in academia and medicine respectively, but Cook had an agent, having written a West End revue for Kenneth Williams. Cook's agent negotiated a higher weekly fee for him, but by the time the agent's fee was deducted Cook actually earned less than the others from the initial run.

The majority of the sketches were by Cook and were largely based on material written for other revues. Among the entirely new material were "The End of the World", "TVPM" and "The Great Train Robbery". Cook and Moore revived some of the sketches on their later television and stage shows, most famously the two-hander "One Leg Too Few". Miller told the press in March 1960 that the show would "be anti-establishment, anti-capital punishment, anti-colour bar and anti-1960. But it will be all very serious stuff, sharp, bitter and to the point."

The show's run in Edinburgh was immensely successful. Before beginning its run in the West End, the show had great success at the Cambridge Arts Theatre, but a brief run in Brighton garnered a lukewarm response. When the revue transferred to the Fortune Theatre in London, opening in early May 1961, in a revised production by Donald Albery and William Donaldson and directed by Eleanor Fazan, it became a true sensation. This was helped in large part by a favourable review by Kenneth Tynan.

In 1962, the show transferred to the John Golden Theatre in New York, with its original cast. President John F. Kennedy attended a performance on 10 February 1963. The show continued in New York, with most of the original cast, until 1964, when Paxton Whitehead replaced Miller, while the London version continued with a different cast until 1966.

== Controversy ==
The revue is widely considered to be ahead of its time, both in its unapologetic willingness to debunk figures of authority, and by virtue of its inherently surrealistic comedic vein. Humiliation of authority was something only previously delved into in The Goon Show and, arguably, Hancock's Half Hour, with such parliamentarians as Winston Churchill and Harold Macmillan coming under special scrutiny—although the BBC were predisposed to frown upon it. Macmillan—according to Cook—was not particularly fond of the slurred caricature and charade of senile forgetfulness (marked by a failure to pronounce "Conservative Party" coherently) handed down on him in Cook's impersonation. Since Beyond the Fringe was not owned by the BBC, however, the quartet enjoyed relative carte blanche. The only protocol they were obliged to adhere to was that, by law, their scripts for theatrical performances had to be sent to the Lord Chamberlain for approval prior to performance, a requirement abolished by the Theatres Act in 1968.

Most specifically, its lampooning of the British war effort in a sketch titled "The Aftermyth of War" was scorned by some war veterans for its supposed insensitivity. One British visitor to the Broadway performance was said to have stood up and shouted "rotters!" at a sketch he found distasteful, before apparently sitting down again and enjoying the remainder of the show, while another, at the first performance in Edinburgh, allegedly stood up and declared that the "young bounders don't know the first thing about it!" and promptly left the auditorium. In response to these negative audience reactions, the Beyond the Fringe team said that they were not ridiculing the efforts of those involved in the war, but were challenging the subsequent media portrayal of them.

== Influence ==
Beyond the Fringe was a forerunner to British television programmes That Was the Week That Was, At Last the 1948 Show, and Monty Python's Flying Circus.

As with the established comedy revue, it was a series of satirical sketches and musical pieces using a minimal set, looking at events of the day and, with Shakespeare, the past. It effectively represented the views and disappointments of the first generation of British people to grow up after World War II, and gave voice to a sense of the loss of national purpose with the end of the British Empire. Although all of the cast contributed material, the most often quoted pieces were those by Cook, many of which had appeared before in his Cambridge Footlights revues. The show broke new ground with Peter Cook's impression of then Prime Minister Harold Macmillan; on one occasion, this was performed with Macmillan in the audience, and Cook added an ad lib ridiculing Macmillan for turning up to watch.

The show is credited with giving many other performers the courage to be satirical and more improvisational in their manner, and broke the conventions of not lampooning the Royal Family or the government of the day. Shakespearean drama was another target of their comedy. There were also a number of musical items in the show, using Dudley Moore's music, most famously an arrangement of the "Colonel Bogey March" that resists Moore's repeated attempts to bring it to an end.

The show prefigured the Satire Boom of the 1960s. Without it, there might not have been either That Was the Week That Was or Private Eye, the satirical magazine which originated at the same time, that partially survived due to financial support from Peter Cook, and that served as the model for the later American Spy magazine. Cook and Moore formed a comedy duo and appeared in the popular television show Not Only... But Also, and the 1967 film Bedazzled. Cook also launched his club, The Establishment, around this time. Many of the members of Monty Python recall being inspired by Beyond the Fringe.

The retrospective show Before the Fringe, broadcast during the early years of BBC 2, took its title from this production. It consisted of performances of material that was popular in theatrical revue before the advent of Beyond the Fringe.

All four members appeared in the Amnesty International charity stage show Pleasure at Her Majesty's, reprising most of the material.

== International success ==
The show's success was not limited to the UK. In 1962, it also opened in South Africa. Next it arrived in the US. First the Broadway Company opened on 27 October 1962, then it was performed by the National Company in 1963. Subsequently, opening on 8 October 1964, the National Touring Company took it on a nationwide tour for six months as Beyond the Fringe '65 under the auspices of Alexander H. Cohen, with the cast consisting of Bob Cessna, Donald Cullen, Joel Fabiani, and James Valentine. Slight changes were made to adapt the show for American audiences, for instance the opening number (discussing America) was retitled "Home Thoughts from Abroad".

The show was revived in slightly altered form in Los Angeles in 2000 and 2001 by Joseph Dunn's ReEstablishment Theater to critical acclaim.

== Legacy ==
The four original members of Beyond the Fringe feature prominently as characters in the play Pete and Dud: Come Again, by Chris Bartlett and Nick Awde. Appropriately, that comedy-drama had a sellout run at the 2005 Edinburgh Festival Fringe before transferring to London's West End at The Venue, in 2006, in a version starring Kevin Bishop as Moore, Tom Goodman-Hill as Cook, Fergus Craig as Alan Bennett and Colin Hoult as Jonathan Miller. It subsequently embarked on a nationwide tour.

The creation, performance and aftermath of the show are covered in the 2004 film Not Only But Always.

Good Evening, Roy Smiles' play about the Beyond The Fringe team, was broadcast on BBC Radio 4 in 2008, with Benedict Cumberbatch as Dudley Moore.

In 2017, Beyond the Fringe was recreated for an episode of the Netflix TV series The Crown in which Prime Minister Macmillan is in attendance and singled out for abuse by Peter Cook (performed by Patrick Warner.)

== Discography ==
- Beyond the Fringe, UK, Parlophone, audio lp, mono, 1961, PMC 1145
- Beyond the Fringe (Original Broadway Cast Recording), USA Capitol, audio lp, mono, 1962, W1792 – also stereo SW1792
- Alexander H Cohen Presents Beyond the Fringe '64, USA Capitol, audio lp, mono, 1964, W2072 – also stereo SW2072
- Complete Beyond the Fringe [Box set], EMI Audio CD, 21 October 1996, ASIN: B000006SW2
- Beyond the Fringe, Acorn Media DVD, 5 October 2005, AMP 7990, ISBN 1-56938-799-0. "The complete 1964 gala farewell performance"
- Beyond the Fringe Live at the Cambridge Arts Theatre, UK, EMI audio CD, 2011

== General bibliography ==
- Bennett, Alan (1994) Writing Home ISBN 0-571-17388-8
- Bergan, Ronald, Beyond the Fringe ... and Beyond. London, Virgin Books (1989) ISBN 1-85227-175-2
- Carpenter, Humphrey (2000) That Was Satire That Was ISBN 0-575-06588-5
- Cook, William, ed. (2004) Goodbye Again ISBN 1-84413-400-8
- Paskin, Barbra (1997) Dudley Moore ISBN 0-330-35322-5
- Thompson, Harry (1997) Peter Cook ISBN 0-340-64969-0
- Wilmut, Roger, From Fringe to Flying Circus: Celebrating a Unique Generation of Comedy, 1960–1980, London, Methuen (1980) ISBN 978-0-413-46950-2
