= Automanikk =

Studio album by A Guy Called Gerald
- Released: 1990
- Genre: House, acid house
- Label: CBS
- Producer: Ricky Rouge (Gerald Simpson)

A Guy Called Gerald chronology
The Peel Sessions (1989)	Automanikk (1990)	28 Gun Bad Boy (1992)

Automanikk is an album by the English musician A Guy Called Gerald, released in 1990. It was one of a number of albums to come from the Madchester scene of Manchester, England. The album peaked at No. 68 in the Official Albums Chart. A Guy Called Gerald supported it with a North American tour. Automanikk was A Guy Called Gerald's only album for a major label, as subsequent efforts were turned down.

== Production ==
"FX (Mayday Upgrade)", which was remixed by Derrick May and Carl Craig, sampled the American girl group First Choice. Elsewhere, A Guy Called Gerald made use of samples of Peter Gabriel's "Sledgehammer" and Snap!'s "The Power".

== Critical reception ==
Professional ratings
Review scores
Source	Rating
AllMusic	4/5 stars
Calgary Herald	D
Chicago Tribune	2/4 stars
Coventry Evening Telegraph	2/5
New York Daily News	2/4 stars
South Wales Echo	4/5 stars
The Virgin Encyclopedia of Dance Music	3/5 stars

The Chicago Tribune described the album as "laid-back New Age house", concluding that "the mind-numbing drum beats and endlessly repeated synth riffs and overdubs must be this tame for a reason." The New York Times said that the vocalist Viv "suggests a latter-day Donna Summer... She sings about being powerless—against the beat, against emotions, against undefined forces." The Calgary Herald dismissed the album as "merely disco dressed up in a paisley shirt." The South Wales Echo said, "Cleverly put together as ever, but more wholesome and less tinny than 808 State and the like." Factsheet Five noted the "heavy repetitive beats [and] occasional ethereal vocal".

AllMusic called Automanikk "a journey through sampladelic [sic] acid house with a few haunted melodies gained from Gerald's exposure to Detroit techno". In 2024, the album was included in Gary Graff's 501 Essential Albums of the '90s: The Music Fan's Definitive Guide.

== Track listing ==
No.	Title	Length
1.	"To the Other Side"
2.	"FX (Mayday Upgrade)"
3.	"Automanikk"
4.	"Emotions Electric 2"
5.	"Eyes of Sorrow (Viv Version)"
6.	"I Feel Rhythm"
7.	"Stella"
8.	"Blame the Artist"
9.	"Untitled"
10.	"I Won't Give In"
11.	"Voodoo Ray Americas"
