= Derek and Clive Ad Nauseam =

Studio album by Derek and Clive
- Released: 1978
- Genre: Comedy
- Length: 60:12 (LP); 78:37 (CD)
- Label: Virgin Records
- Producer: Peter Cook and Dudley Moore

Derek and Clive chronology
Derek and Clive Come Again (1977)	Derek and Clive Ad Nauseam (1978)	Rude & Rare: The Best of Derek and Clive (2011)

Derek and Clive Ad Nauseam is the third and final recording made by Peter Cook and Dudley Moore featuring their characters Derek and Clive. It also charts the breakup of Cook and Moore's partnership.

As a marketing ploy the record was initially released with its own aeroplane sickbag. Moore walked out before the end of this recording as he found his relationship with Cook untenable, particularly because of the level of vitriol directed at him throughout the sessions. The two never worked on a major project again.

Cook filmed some of the proceedings and these were released on the documentary Derek and Clive Get the Horn.

== Track listing ==
All tracks by Peter Cook & Dudley Moore

=== Side 1 ===
1. "Endangered Species" – 5:23
2. "Horse Racing" – 2:47
3. "TV" – 1:27
4. "Bruce Forsyth" – 0:43
5. "Records" – 5:01
6. "Soul Time" – 1:44
7. "Russia" – 1:47
8. "Sir" – 3:07
9. "Celebrity Suicide" – 2:58
10. "Politics" – 1:27
11. "Labels" – 3:10
12. "Street Music" – 0:43

=== Side 2 ===
1. "The Horn" – 23:17
2. "Mona" – 3:29
3. "The Critics" – 3:30

=== Extra material added for CD release in November 1989 ===
1. "Intergalactic Sex" - 0:51
2. "Rape, Death And Paralysis" - 3:02
3. "Lady Vera Fart Teller" - 2:21
4. "I Can't Shit" - 1:42
5. "Sex Manual" - 8:27
6. "Stupid" - 0:23

== Personnel ==
- Peter Cook – vocals
- Dudley Moore – vocals & production

== Certifications ==
Certifications for Ad Nauseam
Region	Certification	Certified units/sales
United Kingdom (BPI)	Silver	60,000^{^}
^{^} Shipments figures based on certification alone.
