= Derek and Clive Get the Horn =

1979 British film by Russell Mulcahy

- DVD cover
- Directed by: Russell Mulcahy
- Written by: Peter Cook; Dudley Moore
- Produced by: Dudley Moore
- Starring: Peter Cook; Dudley Moore
- Cinematography: Mike Dodds; Nicholas D. Knowland; Bryan Loftus
- Edited by: Russell Mulcahy
- Distributed by: GTO
- Release date: October 1979 (UK)
- Running time: 89 minutes
- Country: United Kingdom
- Language: English

Derek and Clive Get the Horn is a 1979 British documentary comedy film that chronicles the recording of Peter Cook and Dudley Moore's 1978 comedy album Derek and Clive Ad Nauseam, their third and final outing featuring their controversial alter-egos Derek and Clive, two foul-mouthed lavatory attendants who banter at length about their surreal day-to-day existences. The footage was shot in early September 1978. The film was the feature film directorial debut of Russell Mulcahy, who would go on to direct Highlander.

== Cast ==
- Peter Cook as Clive
- Dudley Moore as Derek
- Judy Huxtable as Judy Cook
- Nicola Austin as lady who came in and took her clothes off
- Richard Branson as man with a beard

== Release ==
The film was intended for a theatrical release, but in October 1980, the British Board of Film Classification rejected it outright on the grounds of its sustained and excessive use of very strong language (the uses of "fuck" and "cunt"), and blasphemy.

Cook instead chose to release the film straight to video, a format that was at the time unregulated, but this plan also ran into trouble when several hundred copies were impounded by James Anderton of the Greater Manchester Police, bankrupting the small company behind the release. Derek and Clive Get the Horn was finally granted an uncut 18 certificate in 1993 and was released as a sell-through video by PolyGram.
