= Black Secret Technology =

Studio album by A Guy Called Gerald
- Released: March 1995
- Studios: Machine Room Studio, England
- Genres: Jungle; drum and bass; ambient jungle
- Length: 77:57
- Label: Juice Box
- Producer: Gerald Simpson

A Guy Called Gerald chronology
28 Gun Bad Boy (1992)	Black Secret Technology (1995)	Essence (2000)

Singles from Black Secret Technology
- 1. "Finley's Rainbow" Released: 1994; 2. "So Many Dreams" Released: 1996

Black Secret Technology is a jungle album by the British electronic music producer A Guy Called Gerald. It was released in March 1995 through Gerald's own label Juice Box. It entered the CIN's Dance Albums Chart at No. 8 in April.

It was met with widespread critical acclaim. It has since been described as the best jungle album of all time by publications such as Fact, Pitchfork and Freaky Trigger.

== Background and release ==
Following Gerald's pioneering work in acid house in the late 1980s, Black Secret Technology showcased his movement into jungle and breakbeat production. The album's liner notes, written by Gerald, reference the music of ancient African tribal cultures as inspiration: "methods of rhythm helped early man to get in touch with the universe and his small part in it [...] I believe that these trance-like rhythms reflect my frustration to know the truth about my ancestors who talked with drums."

The record was released in March 1995. It entered the CIN's Dance Albums Chart at No. 8 on 1 April.

In 1996, the album was repressed on CD and LP formats with new cover artwork and the bonus track "Hekkle and Koch" placed as the album's opener. In 2008, a remastered edition of the album was released, this time with the original 1995 cover art and the removal of both "Hekkle and Koch" and the unlisted hidden track "Touch Me". The album's famously "murky" mastering was improved slightly, according to critics.

== Reception ==
Professional ratings
Review scores
Source	Rating
AllMusic	5/5 stars
Cokemachineglow	94%
The Guardian	4/4 stars
NME	8/10
Pitchfork	8.7/10
Q	3/5 stars
Record Collector	4/5 stars
Select	4/5
Vox	8/10
XLR8R	9.5/10

Since its release, Black Secret Technology has received widespread acclaim and has been described as a "candidate for 'best jungle album ever.'" In a 1995 review, Andrew Smith of The Guardian proclaimed that Gerald was "among the first of his peers to corral [the genre] on to a satisfying album" as he had previously done with acid house, calling it "enthralling". Select placed the album on their list of the top 50 albums of 1995 at number 16. Discussing the 1997 reissue, Ian Harrison of Select stated that "there're few records in this fast-moving genre that could sound as good as this does now," adding that "the album will one day have him listed among Sun Ra/Lee Perry/George Clinton cosmic clubhouse of interstellar visionaries." In 1999, Tom Ewing of Freaky Trigger described it as the "best jungle album ever", stating that Gerald "latched onto a more turbulent tradition, the jazz-funk-electronica of Pangaea-era Miles Davis or Sextant-era Herbie Hancock, and the music he made boiled like theirs." He ranked "Finley's Rainbow" as the sixth best single of the 1990s.

In 2010, Fact magazine ranked Black Secret Technology the fourth best album of the 1990s, calling it "gloriously knotted, soulful and uniquely psychedelic;" Fact critic Mark Fisher wrote that the album "succeeded in simultaneously being of its moment and transcending it," praising in particular "the way that Gerald transforms the jungle sound into a kind of dreamy OtherWorld music [...]: humid, tropical, full of strange bird cries, seething with nonhuman sentience." Tim Finney of Pitchfork wrote that "there is simply no other single-artist jungle album that pushes consciousness-altering beat programming as far, as fearlessly, as it is pushed here." Lee Arizuno of The Quietus called it "one of the best dance albums ever made", adding that "what stands is psychedelic rhythm with a purpose: to reconnect in the midst of a formless and hectic present, to present a human glow in the midst of a harsh environment."

== Track listing ==
Black Secret Technology track listing
No.	Title	Length
1.	"So Many Dreams"	6:45
2.	"Alita's Dream"	5:00
3.	"Finley's Rainbow" (Slow Motion mix)	5:30
4.	"The Nile"	4:14
5.	"Energy" (extended mix)	6:12
6.	"Silent Cry"	5:42
7.	"Dreaming of You"	6:12
8.	"Survival"	5:44
9.	"Cybergen"	4:32
10.	"The Reno"	5:18
11.	"Cyberjazz"	4:52
12.	"Voodoo Rage"	6:02
13.	"Life Unfolds His Mystery"	5:21
14.	"End of the Tunnel" (hidden track on CD only, not included on 2008 reissue)	6:33
Total length:		77:57

== Charts ==
Chart performance for Black Secret Technology
Chart (1995)	Peak position
UK Dance Albums Chart (CIN)	8
