= One Leg Too Few =

Comedy sketch by Peter Cook

"One Leg Too Few" is a comedy sketch written by Peter Cook and most famously performed by Cook and Dudley Moore. It is a classic example of comedy arising from an absurd situation which the participants take entirely seriously (comic irony), and a demonstration of the construction of a sketch in order to draw a laugh from the audience with almost every line. Peter Cook said that this was one of the most perfect sketches he had acted in, and that it amazed him, later in his career, that he could have created it so young, at the age of 17 or 18.

It first appeared in a revue, Something Borrowed, at Pembroke College in 1960 (where it was titled "Leg Too Few", for the show had an alphabetical theme and the sketch appeared under the letter "L"), and later the same year in the Footlights revue Pop Goes Mrs Jessop. It appeared on the West End stage for the first time in 1961 as part of One Over the Eight, a revue that starred Kenneth Williams. Its first public performance with Dudley Moore in the role of Spiggot was as part of Beyond the Fringe at the Cambridge Arts Theatre on 21 April 1961. Although it was initially omitted from the London production of Beyond the Fringe (owing to One Over The Eight running concurrently at a nearby theatre), it was reinstated for the show's transfer to Broadway. Cook and Moore also performed the sketch in their 1973 stage show Behind the Fridge (retitled Good Evening! in the USA), and also gave standalone performances on various occasions, including the 1965 Royal Variety Performance, a 1976 episode of Saturday Night Live, and the 1989 charity show The Secret Policeman's Biggest Ball. A version of the sketch, in which Spiggott is applying for a job as a runner, appeared in Cook and Moore's 1978 film The Hound of the Baskervilles.

== Sketch ==
The sketch takes place in the office of a casting agent. Cook plays the agent and Moore the prospective actor, a Mr Spiggott (this name was a favourite of Cook, and was re-used as the earthly identity of the Devil in the film Bedazzled). Cook begins the sketch by calling for his secretary to show the next auditioner into the office. Moore, a one-legged man, enters, hopping on his right foot. Moore's left leg is tied up behind him and obscured beneath an overcoat during the sketch (Moore did actually have a slightly deformed left leg in real life as the result of a club foot). Eventually, Moore comes to a stop, balanced on one leg. He is required to hold this position for most of the sketch; his difficulty in doing so occasions much amusement from the audience – though in most performances, he has a chair on which to hold to keep his balance. The premise of the sketch is then laid out thus:

Cook: Mr Spiggott – you are, I believe, auditioning for the part of Tarzan.
Moore: Right.
Cook: Now Mr Spiggott, I couldn't help noticing – almost at once – that you are a one-legged person.
Moore: You noticed that?
Cook: I noticed that, Mr Spiggott. When you have been in the business as long as I have, you come to notice these little things almost instinctively.

The agent goes on to point out that Tarzan is "a role which traditionally involves the use of a two-legged actor" and that it would be unusual for the part to be taken by a "unidexter", but Spiggott's enthusiasm is undimmed. Cook keeps a straight face as he explains exactly why Spiggott is unsuitable for the role.

Cook: Need I say with over much emphasis that it is in the leg division that you are deficient.
Moore: The leg division?
Cook: Yes, the leg division, Mr Spiggott. You are deficient in it to the tune of one. Your right leg, I like. I like your right leg. A lovely leg for the role. That's what I said when I saw you come in. I said, "A lovely leg for the role." I've got nothing against your right leg. The trouble is – neither have you.

Cook would often add the line "you fall down on your left" in other versions of the sketch.

The sketch continues in a similar vein with the agent observing that at least Spiggott scores over a man with no legs at all (in the later versions, Spiggot enthusiastically agrees that he has "twice as many" as a man with none) and that there is always a chance that no two-legged actor will apply for the role "in, say, the next eighteen months", in which case Spiggott, as a "unidexter", is "just the sort of person we shall be attempting to contact telephonically". Spiggott, clearly an eternal optimist, leaves the office happy with these reassurances.

In some early versions of the sketch (including the one recorded by Kenneth Williams), a further punchline follows after Moore has left. A two-legged actor walks in normally:

Cook: Ah, good morning Mr. Stanger. Now I believe you are applying for the role of Long John Silver.

Moore went on to play Mr. Spiggot in the 1978 film The Hound of the Baskervilles. In that film, Sherlock Holmes (played by Peter Cook) recruits the single-legged Mr. Spiggot as a runner during his investigations.
