= A Guy Called Gerald =

British musician

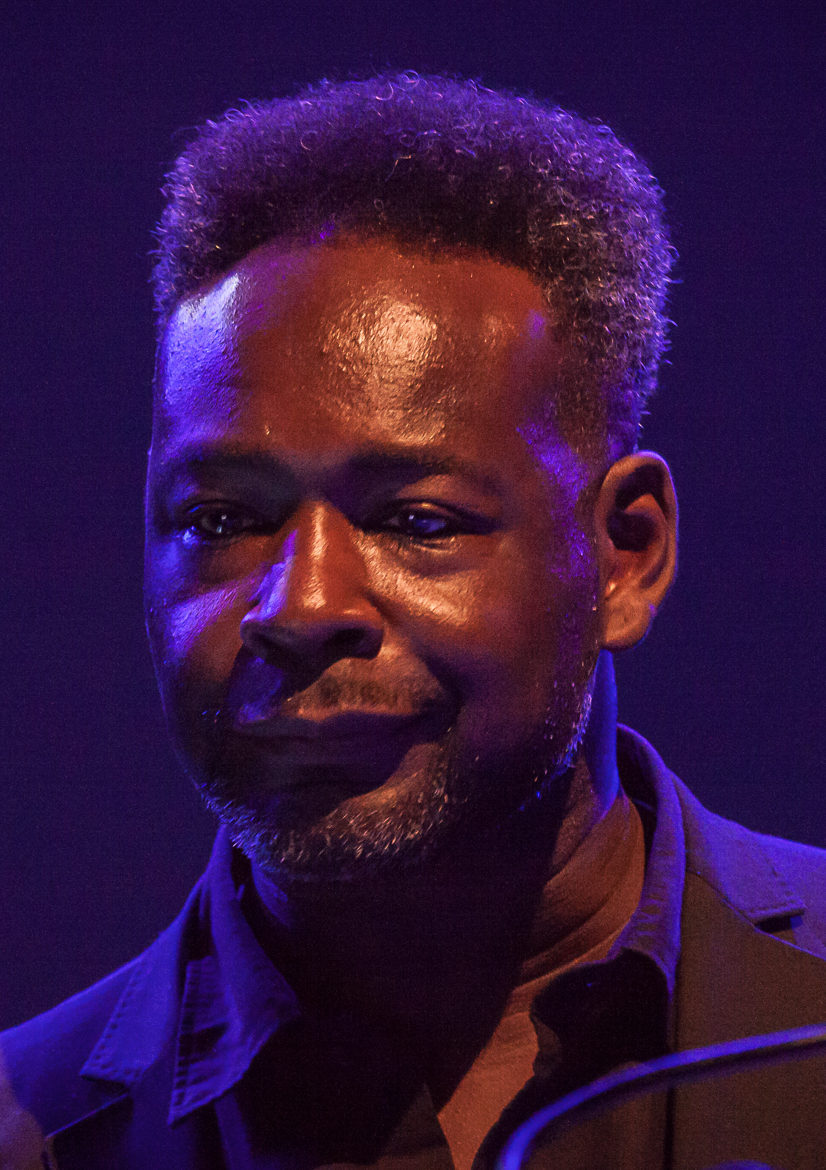
- A Guy Called Gerald in 2014

Background information
- Born: Gerald Simpson; 16 February 1967 (age 59)
- Origin: Moss Side, Manchester, England
- Genres: Acid house; drum and bass; jungle; electronic
- Occupations: DJ; record producer; musician
- Instruments: Keyboards; drum machine; sampler; turntables
- Labels: SUGOI; Protechshon; Columbia; CBS; Juice Box; Retroactive; !K7; Sender; Laboratory Instinct; Perlon; Bosconi; A Guy Called Gerald
- Website: guycalledgerald.com

Gerald Rydel Simpson (born 16 February 1967), better known as A Guy Called Gerald, is a British record producer and musician. He was an early member of the electronic group 808 State, contributing to their debut LP Newbuild (1988) and hit single "Pacific State" (1989). He also achieved solo success with his 1988 hit single "Voodoo Ray", considered the first British-made acid house track, which became a touchstone of Manchester's acid house scene and reached No. 12 in the UK charts.

He embraced breakbeat production in the 1990s, with his 1995 album Black Secret Technology becoming a "much-touted candidate for 'best jungle album ever.'" He also ran the London-based independent record label Juice Box Records from 1991 to 1998.

== Early life and influences ==
Simpson was influenced by his Jamaican roots; his father's blue beat, ska and Trojan reggae record collection, his mother's Pentecostal church sessions and the Jamaican sound system parties in Manchester's Moss Side area where he grew up. In his youth, he also spent time living in the city's notorious Hulme Crescents estate.

He absorbed jazz fusion and electro funk at clubs, youth clubs and shebeens such as Legends, St.Alfonso's, British Legion and the Reno in Manchester, where the dancefloor in the early 1980s inspired him to study contemporary dance. Manchester was a hotbed of dance music with black club nights open every night of the week and Simpson spent his time joining in the vibe. Simpson was principally influenced by dancers such as Foot Patrol and the Jazz Defektors, regulars in the North of England black club scene.

Around 1983 with electro booming and early hip hop, breakdancing and b-boy culture from Detroit and Chicago – from producers such as Juan Atkins, Derrick May, Kevin Saunderson was being played by Stu Allan on Piccadilly Radio and imported directly into Manchester's specialist record shops.

== Career ==
=== 808 State and "Voodoo Ray" ===
Inspired, Simpson began experimenting with tape editing and drum machines and the regular jams in the attic of his house led to forming the Scratchbeat Masters. Using cut up beats, samples and turntables they would challenge other bands and their sound systems. They released a 12" single called "Wax on the Melt", a collaboration between a number of crews and Graham Massey and Martin Price together with whom he would later form 808 State. Their first album, Newbuild, was released in 1988, but he soon left the group to concentrate on his solo work.

The result of heading back into his bedroom studio was "Voodoo Ray", played first at the Hacienda in 1988, and then the underground clubs before entering the UK Singles Chart a year later. It was the first acid house track produced in the UK, and released on a small Merseyside independent label (Rham! Records) based in Wallasey. "Voodoo Ray" entered the UK chart in 1989 rising to number 12.

At the same time a track Simpson started before leaving 808 State, "Pacific State", was released and hit the charts. However, according to Simpson, they had finished and released the track without his permission. Although Simpson was credited on its first release on the album Quadrastate both as a writer and co-producer, the dispute escalated as Simpson claimed to have written the entire track.

Gerald subsequently signed with Sony Music and released the albums Hot Lemonade (1989) and Automanikk (1990) to moderate commercial success. He was subsequently allowed to leave his Sony contract after the label refused to release his intended follow-up album High Life, Low Profile. The album was reportedly rejected for being too song-oriented.

=== Juice Box Records and jungle ===
Juice Box Records
- Founded: 1991
- Founder: Gerald Simpson
- Defunct: 1998
- Genre: Jungle; drum and bass
- Country of origin: United Kingdom
- Location: Manchester, England

In 1991, he started his own label, Juice Box Records, releasing a string of 12" singles – the seeds of what became known as jungle and later drum and bass. The first singles were compiled and released on his third album 28 Gun Bad Boy (1992). In 1995, his next album, Black Secret Technology was released. A remastered version was re-issued in June 2008.

Juice Box Records was an independent record label in the United Kingdom, based at Riverside Studios in West London. It was established by Simpson in 1991, after he left SME Records, and closed in 1998. It took its name from the sound system that Simpson operated with MC Tunes. The label provided an outlet for seven years for Simpson's work, with thirty three titles released under various other pseudonyms such as The K.G.B. and Ricky Rouge, and collaborations between Simpson and artists including Lisa May, DJ Tamsin, Goldie (as 'The 2 G's'), and Finley Quaye.

The label has been identified as being responsible for influential releases that provided the blueprint for what was to become jungle then drum and bass, with early singles on the label described as "genre-defining". The early singles on the label were compiled on the LP 28 Gun Bad Boy, of which Simon Reynolds of Melody Maker stated in a review of the album, "If there was a blueprint for what would transform rave into jungle/techno, then this is it.". It is regarded as the first full-length jungle album ever released.

Reynolds also stated in a Melody Maker article in October 1994, about Simpson's Juice Box-era music, "Gerald's tracks take the jungle mesh of polyrhythms, cross-rhythms and counter-rhythms to new levels of insane detail." Gerald's Black Secret Technology LP was released in 1995 and reached the UK Albums Chart at number 64, including contributions from Goldie and Finley Quaye, In 1998, the label closed, with Simpson relocating to New York.

=== 1997–2013 ===
In 1997, he moved to New York and, in 2000, released Essence on the independent label !K7 Records. Essence was Simpson's first song-based rather than dance/club album, featuring guests such as Lou Rhodes, David Simpson, Lady Miss Kier and Wendy Page. In January 2005, he released a more ambient album To All Things What They Need, also on !K7 Records.

In August 2006, Proto Acid / The Berlin Sessions was released on the German label, Laboratory Instinct. A continuous mix album, it was recorded live in Berlin. The second album in The Berlin Sessions series was released in 2010: Tronic Jazz / The Berlin Sessions.

"How Long Is Now" EP was released on Bosconi Records in 2012.

In 2013, the album Silent Spread Sound Spectrum was released on the Society of Sound – a subscription based music retail project by Bowers & Wilkins audio equipment company. Subscribers receive two albums per month curated by Peter Gabriel and the London Symphony Orchestra. The entire track was performed by Gerald live from two laptops.

== Discography ==
- Albums credited to A Guy Called Gerald unless otherwise noted

=== Albums ===
- Hot Lemonade (1989 – Rham! Records)
- Automanikk (1990 – Columbia/CBS) – UK #68
- High Life, Low Profile (Columbia/CBS, 1990 – unreleased)
- 28 Gun Bad Boy (1992 – Juice Box Records)
- Black Secret Technology (1995 – Juice Box Records) – UK #64
- Cryogenix (1999 – MP3.com)
- Essence (2000 – !K7 Records)
- To All Things What They Need (2005 – !K7 Records)
- Proto Acid – The Berlin Sessions (2006 – Laboratory Instinct)
- Tronic Jazz – The Berlin Sessions (2010 – Laboratory Instinct)
- Silent Sound Spread Spectrum (2013 – Bowers & Wilkins – 60, Real World Records – 60, Society of Sound Music – 60)

=== Live ===
- The John Peel Sessions (Strange Fruit 1989)
- The John Peel Sessions – A Guy Called Gerald (Strange Fruit 1999)

=== Singles / 12" ===
- "Voodoo Ray" single (Rham! Records 1988) – UK #12
- Voodoo Ray EP (Rham! Records 1989)
- "Voodoo Ray Remixes" (Warlock USA 1988)
- "Voodoo Ray Remixes" (Rham! Records 1988)
- "Hot Lemonade" (Rham! Records 1989)
- "Hot Lemonade Youth Remixes" (Rham! Records 1989)
- The Peel Sessions EP (Strange Fruit 1989)
- "Trip City" (1989) – 5 track cassette 'soundtrack' accompanying the novel Trip City
- "FX" / "Eyes of Sorrow" (1989) – UK #52
- "FX Mayday Mix" (CBS / Sony 1989)
- "FX Elevation Mix" (CBS / Sony 1989)
- The Peel Sessions EP (USA 1990)
- "Automanikk (Just 4 U Gordon Mix" EP USA 1990)
- "Automanikk (Bass Overload Mix" EP USA 1990)
- "Automanikk (Bass Overload Mix" EP USA 1990)
- "Emotions Electric" (Juice Box Records 1990)
- "Disneyband / Anything" (Juice Box Records 1991)
- "Nowhere to Run" – Inertia (Black Out Records 1991)
- "Digital Bad Boy" (Juice Box Records 1992)
- "Cops" (Juice Box Records 1992)
- "Ses Makes You Wise" (Juice Box Records 1992)
- "The Musical Magical Midi Machine" (Juice Box Records 1992)
- "Changing" (Juice Box Records 1992)
- "I Feel the Magic" - The K.G.B. (Juice Box Records 1993)
- "Strange Love" – Ricky Rouge (Juice Box Records 1993)
- "Strange Love Remixes" – Ricky Rouge (Juice Box Records 1993)
- "When You Took My Love" – Ricky Rouge (Juice Box Records 1993)
- "De Ja Vu" – Ricky Rouge (Juice Box Records 1993)
- "Song for Every Man" – Ricky Rouge (Juice Box Records 1993)
- "Satisfaction" – Inertia (Juice Box Records 1993)
- "Fragments" – Inertia (Juice Box Records 1993)
- "Too Fucked to Dance" (Juice Box Records 1993)
- "The Glok" (Juice Box Records 1993)
- "Nazinji-zaka" (Juice Box Records 1993)
- "Darker Than I Should Be" (Juice Box Records 1993)
- "Finley's Rainbow" (Juice Box Records 1995)
- "Finley's Rainbow Remixes" (Juice Box Records 1995)
- "So Many Dreams" (Juice Box Records 1996)
- "The Curse of Voodoo Ray" featuring Lisa May (Juice Box Records 1996)
- "Radar Systems" (Juice Box Records 1998)
- "Fever" (!K7 2000)
- "Humanity" (!K7 2000)
- "First Try" (!K7 2005)
- "Flo-ride" (Sugoi 2005)
- "Is Man in Danger" (Protechshon 2005)
- "Sufistifunk" (Sugoi 2006)
- "Time to Jak" (Sender 2006)
- "Proto Acid / The Berlin Sessions 1" (Laboratory Instinct 2006)
- "Proto Acid / The Berlin Sessions 2" (Laboratory Instinct 2006)
- "In Ya Head" (featuring Mia) (Perlon Records PERL71 2008)
- "Tronic Jazz / The Berlin Sessions 1" (Laboratory Instinct 2010)
- "Tronic Jazz / The Berlin Sessions 2" (Laboratory Instinct 2010)
- "Tronic Jazz / The Berlin Sessions 3" (Laboratory Instinct 2010)
- "Tronic Jazz / The Berlin Sessions 4" (Laboratory Instinct 2010)
- "How Long Is Now" (Bosconi Records 2012 BOSCO021)

=== With 808 State ===
- "Pacific State" (1989)
- Let Yourself Go EP (1988)
- Newbuild LP (Creed 1988)
- Prebuild LP (Rephlex 2004)

=== Other collaborations ===
- "Dream 17" – Annette (Deconstruction 1988)
- "Massage-a-Rama" – Lounge Jays (1989)
- "Born in the North" – US (Wooden 1989)
- "Energy" – The Two G'$ (Juice Box 1995)
- "Black Gravity" – with Herbie Hancock / Bill Laswell (2001)
- "Falling" – Tom Clark and Benno Blome featuring A Guy Called Gerald (Highgrade 2011)
- "PositiveNoise" / "I Seem to Be a Verb" – System 7 and A Guy Called Gerald (A-Wave 2011)

== See also ==
- Chicago house
- Detroit techno
- List of jungle and drum and bass artists

== General references ==
- Bidder, Sean; Rough Guides (1999) The Rough Guide to House ISBN 1-85828-432-5
- Carlisle, Colin (1995) Fly | Global Music Culture
- Kabuubi, Maxine (2000) Knowledge Magazine
- Shapiro, Peter; Rough Guides (1999) The Rough Guide to Drum n Bass ISBN 1-85828-433-3
