= Robert Ponsonby =

English arts administrator (1926–2019)

- Born: 19 December 1926; Oxford
- Died: 3 November 2019 (aged 92)
- Occupation: Arts administrator

Robert Noel Ponsonby (19 December 1926 – 3 November 2019) was an English arts administrator and director of the Edinburgh International Festival from 1956 to 1960.

Ponsonby was born in Oxford, educated at Eton College and served in the Scots Guards. After two years at the Independent Television Authority and eight years as head of the Scottish National Orchestra, he became Controller of Music at the BBC from 1972 for 13 years, succeeding William Glock (and during most of that time also in charge of the BBC Proms). He was artistic director of the Canterbury Festival in 1987–88.

He published two books of musical interviews and reminiscences: Musical Heroes (2009) and In and Out of Tune (2016).
