= Derek and Clive Come Again =

Studio album by Derek and Clive
- Released: 1977
- Genre: Comedy
- Label: Virgin Records
- Producers: Peter Cook and Dudley Moore

Derek and Clive chronology
Derek and Clive (Live) (1976)	Derek and Clive Come Again (1977)	Derek and Clive Ad Nauseam (1978)

Derek and Clive Come Again, subtitled on the CD reissue as "Further Ejaculations From......" is the second record released by Derek and Clive, a pair of characters created by comedy duo Peter Cook and Dudley Moore. Although the first album, Derek and Clive (Live), was reasonably good-natured in its blasphemous subversiveness, Come Again was released at the height of the punk rock phenomenon and Cook, in particular, seems keen to elevate the excess to new heights of jaw-dropping offensiveness. To that end, he improvises routines about raping the victims of road traffic accidents and cross-dressing members of the aristocracy masturbating rent boys in taxi cabs, not to mention several extended routines on cancer in all its variations. Moore, on the other hand, improvises a smutty rhyme about his mother sucking his penis, oral sex performed in lavatory cubicles and how he masturbates with the aid of a greased toilet roll connected to his electric train-set.

Throughout much of the album (recorded in just one day for a Christmas release), both Cook and especially Moore are drunk and out of control, with Moore in particular regularly collapsing in hysterics (Cook achieving his primary comic aim of making Moore laugh with regular ease). Shortly after the album's release, controversy unsurprisingly erupted in a variety of forms, most notably a petrol station attendant being fired from his job after it was discovered that he owned a copy of the album (Cook testified at the man's industrial tribunal), and a distributor of talking books accidentally sending out copies of Come Again on cassette in cases intended for the children's classic Black Beauty. The CD reissue adds several previously unreleased routines, including a sketch about Derek (Moore) cutting his wife's hymen out with an electric carving knife, and one of their most popular sketches amongst their fans, 'Mother', in which Moore plays Cooks hysterical, domineering, deranged mother. Like much of the extra material, it was actually recorded during the 'Ad Nauseam' sessions a couple of years later than the original Come Again album.

== Track listing ==
All tracks by Peter Cook & Dudley Moore

=== As listed on LP cover ===
1. Side One: Ay, Bee, See, You, En, Tee
2. Side Two: Ef. You2, See2, Kay, En2, Gee

=== As listed on LP label: Side 1 ===
1. "Coughin' Contest" – 2:37
2. "Cancer" – 0:29
3. "Non-Stop Dancer / My Mum Song" – 5:36
4. "Joan Crawford" – 5:05
5. "Norman The Carpet" – 1:38
6. "How's Your Mother" – 4:40
7. "Back Of The Cab" – 6:23
8. "Alfie Noakes" – 3:01
9. "Nurse" – 0:48

=== As listed on LP label: Side 2 ===
1. "In The Cubicles" – 5:15
2. "Ross McPharter" – 3:42
3. "Hello Colin" – 0:16
4. "Having A Wank" – 11:54
5. "I Saw This Bloke" – 1:42
6. "Parking Offence" – 5:45
7. "Members Only" – 3:31

=== CD release ===
1. "You Stupid Cunt" – 1:29**
2. "Coughin' Contest" – 2:38
3. "Cancer" – 0:30
4. "Non-Stop Dancer / My Mum Song" – 5:36
5. "Joan Crawford" – 5:04
6. "Norman The Carpet" – 1:37
7. "How's Your Mother" – 4:40
8. "Back Of The Cab" – 6:22
9. "Alfie Noakes" – 3:00
10. "Nurse" – 0:48
11. "In The Cubicles" – 5:15
12. "Ross McPharter" – 3:41
13. "Hello Colin" – 0:16
14. "Having A Wank" – 11:54
15. "I Saw This Bloke" – 1:41
16. "Parking Offence" – 5:45
17. "Members Only" – 3:31
18. "Valerie's Hymen" – 2:05*
19. "Mother" – 8:48*
20. "Films" – 3:15*
21. "Young Dudley Moore Performs "Jump" – 1:47*

* Extra material (from the Ad Nauseam/Get the Horn) sessions included on CD release in November 1989. 'Films', however, was later dropped from subsequent reissues - the reasons for this remain unclear. This had the result that the "Warning" on the later CD's insert that "This CD contains another 17 mins, 27 secs of filthy language" is incorrect as they contain 14 mins 12 secs of extra material.
** 'You Stupid Cunt' was initially recorded on the same day as the rest of 'Come Again' but was not included on the original vinyl release.

== Personnel ==
- Peter Cook – vocals
- Dudley Moore – vocals

== Certifications ==
Certifications for Come Again
Region	Certification	Certified units/sales
United Kingdom (BPI)	Silver	60,000^{^}
^{^} Shipments figures based on certification alone.
