= Derek and Clive (Live) =

Live album (comedy) by Derek and Clive
- Released: 1976
- Recorded: Electric Lady Studios, New York City and the Bottom Line (Live) Late 1973
- Genre: Comedy
- Label: Island Records
- Producer: Peter Cook and Dudley Moore

Derek and Clive chronology
Derek and Clive (Live) (1976)	Derek and Clive Come Again (1977)

Derek and Clive (Live) is the debut comedy record recorded by Derek and Clive, drunken alter-egos created by comedy duo Peter Cook and Dudley Moore. The double act began as a private joke between the two of them at the Electric Lady Studios, as a way of easing the tension of their 1973 Broadway show Good Evening. Originally, the record was never intended for release, but when bootleg copies of the recordings proved popular, Cook decided there was money to be made and, padding the record out with live material recorded at the Bottom Line in New York City, the album was released in 1976. The record was very nearly called Derek and Clive (Dead).

The sleeve notes give a flavour of the production of the record:

"Peter Cook and Dudley Moore were appearing on Broadway in the show "Good Evening" when they first happened upon two brilliant new talents. Derek and Clive were working at the time in the toilets of the British Trade Centre. Cook and Moore were quick to see that they had made a major discovery and after much persuasion, including a packet of Craven A and a bottle of Tizer, Derek and Clive agreed to perform at the Electric Lady Studios. With growing assurance they appeared in front of a small, invited audience (Dudley Moore). The record you have bought is a mixture of the two evenings. Once they had mastered which end of the microphone to talk into, Derek and Clive gained enormously in confidence. Their method is basically a stream of unconsciousness, a mixture of Dylan Thomas and Mae West, with overtones of Goethe. At a time when British influence is declining throughout the world, Derek and Clive represent welcome evidence of what this great country could be. They are a ray of hope on a darkening horizon. Their philosophy is both an inspiration to youth and hope for the senile. On this record they discuss fully and frankly the major problems confronting a confused world. Not since Isaac Newton sat in a bath and discovered that apples could stun Archimedes, has such a fully fledged Weltanschauung emerged. Since the recording, Derek and Clive have been besieged by offers, Vegas, The London Palladium, Fiji but they prefer the simple, natural life of the toilets. "There's a certain rhythm there", says Derek. "You know where you stand", states Clive. One cannot but sympathise with them. The seemingly glittering world of 'Show business' with its broken marriages, drugs and enormous rewards leaves them uninterested. We can only admire their straightforward point of view. Poets? satirists? philosophers? comedians? social commentators? Derek and Clive sum it up more succinctly. "Just a couple of cunts" is their frank self-appraisal."

== Track listing ==
1. The Worst Job I Ever Had
2. This Bloke Came Up To Me
3. The Worst Job He Ever Had
4. Squatter And The Ant
5. In The Lav
6. Little Flo
7. Just One Of Those Songs
8. Winkie Wanky Woo
9. Bo Duddley
10. Blind
11. Top Rank
12. Cancer
13. Jump

== Charts ==
Chart (1981)	Peak position
Australian (Kent Music Report)	74

== Certifications ==
Certifications for Derek And Clive Live
Region	Certification	Certified units/sales
United Kingdom (BPI)	Silver	60,000^{^}
United Kingdom (BPI) 1993 release	Silver	60,000^{*}
^{*} Sales figures based on certification alone.^{^} Shipments figures based on certification alone.
