= Dudley Moore =

English actor, comedian and musician (1935–2002)

Dudley Moore CBE
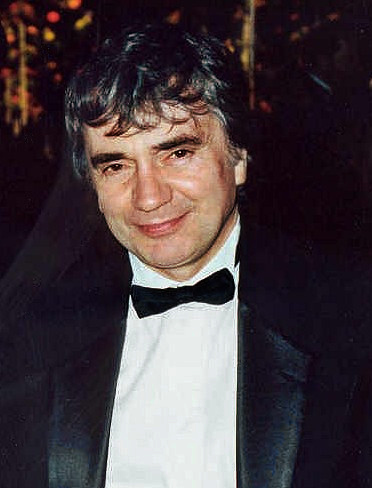
- Moore at the 1991 Emmy Awards
- Born: Dudley Stuart John Moore; 19 April 1935; Charing Cross, London, England
- Died: 27 March 2002 (aged 66); Plainfield, New Jersey, US
- Resting place: Hillside Cemetery, Scotch Plains, New Jersey, US
- Education: University of Oxford
- Occupations: Actor; comedian; musician; composer
- Years active: 1958–1999
- Spouse: Suzy Kendall (m. 1968; div. 1972) Tuesday Weld (m. 1975; div. 1980) Brogan Lane (m. 1988; div. 1991) Nicole Rothschild (m. 1994; div. 1998)
- Children: 2

Dudley Stuart John Moore (19 April 1935 – 27 March 2002) was an English actor, comedian, musician and composer. He first came to prominence in the UK as a leading figure in the British satire boom of the 1960s. He was one of the four writer-performers in the groundbreaking satirical comedy revue Beyond the Fringe from 1960 to 1964. With another member of that team, Peter Cook, Moore collaborated on the BBC television series Not Only... But Also from 1965 to 1970. In their popular double act, Moore's buffoonery contrasted with Cook's deadpan monologues. They jointly received the 1966 British Academy Television Award for Best Entertainment Performance and worked together on other projects, such as the hit film Bedazzled (1967) and the Derek and Clive series of comedy albums. Moore and Cook ceased working together regularly after 1978, by which time Moore had settled in Los Angeles, California, to concentrate on his film career.

Following Bedazzled, Moore's work as a comedy film actor was marked by further hit films, particularly Foul Play (1978), 10 (1979) and Arthur (1981). For Arthur, Moore was nominated for the Academy Award for Best Actor and won a Golden Globe Award. He received a second Golden Globe for his performance in Micki & Maude (1984). Moore was awarded a star on the Hollywood Walk of Fame in 1987 and was made a CBE by Queen Elizabeth II at Buckingham Palace on 16 November 2001 in what was his last public appearance.

== Early life and education ==
Moore was born at the original Charing Cross Hospital in central London, the son of Ada Francis (née Hughes), a secretary, and John Moore, a railway electrician from Glasgow. He had an older sister, Barbara. Moore was brought up on the Becontree estate in Dagenham, Essex. He was short at 5 ft 2 in (1.57 m) and had club feet that required extensive hospital treatment. This made him the butt of jokes from other children. His right foot responded well to corrective treatment by the time he was six, but his left foot was permanently twisted and his left leg below the knee was withered. He remained self-conscious about this throughout his life.

Moore became a chorister at the age of six. When he was 11 years old, he earned a scholarship to the Guildhall School of Music, where he took up harpsichord, organ, violin, musical theory and composition. He rapidly developed into a highly talented pianist and organist and was playing the organ at local church weddings by the age of 14. He attended Dagenham County High School, where he received dedicated musical tuition from Peter Cork (1926–2012), who helped him towards his Oxford music scholarship. (Norma Winstone was another student of Cork's at Dagenham). Cork was also a composer. Moore kept in touch until the mid-1990s and his letters to Cork were published in 2006.

In 1955 Moore won an organ scholarship to Magdalen College, Oxford, where he was tutored by the composer Bernard Rose and from where he graduated in 1958. While studying music and composition there, he also performed with Alan Bennett in The Oxford Revue. During his university years, Moore developed a love of jazz music and became an accomplished jazz pianist and composer. He began working with musicians such as John Dankworth and Cleo Laine. In 1960, Moore left Dankworth's band to work on Beyond the Fringe.

== Career ==
=== Jazz pianist ===
On leaving Oxford University in 1958 he joined John Dankworth's big band on piano. Subsequently he made a number of recordings leading his own trio including Pete McGurk (later replaced by Jeff Clyne) on bass and Chris Karan on drums.

=== Beyond the Fringe ===
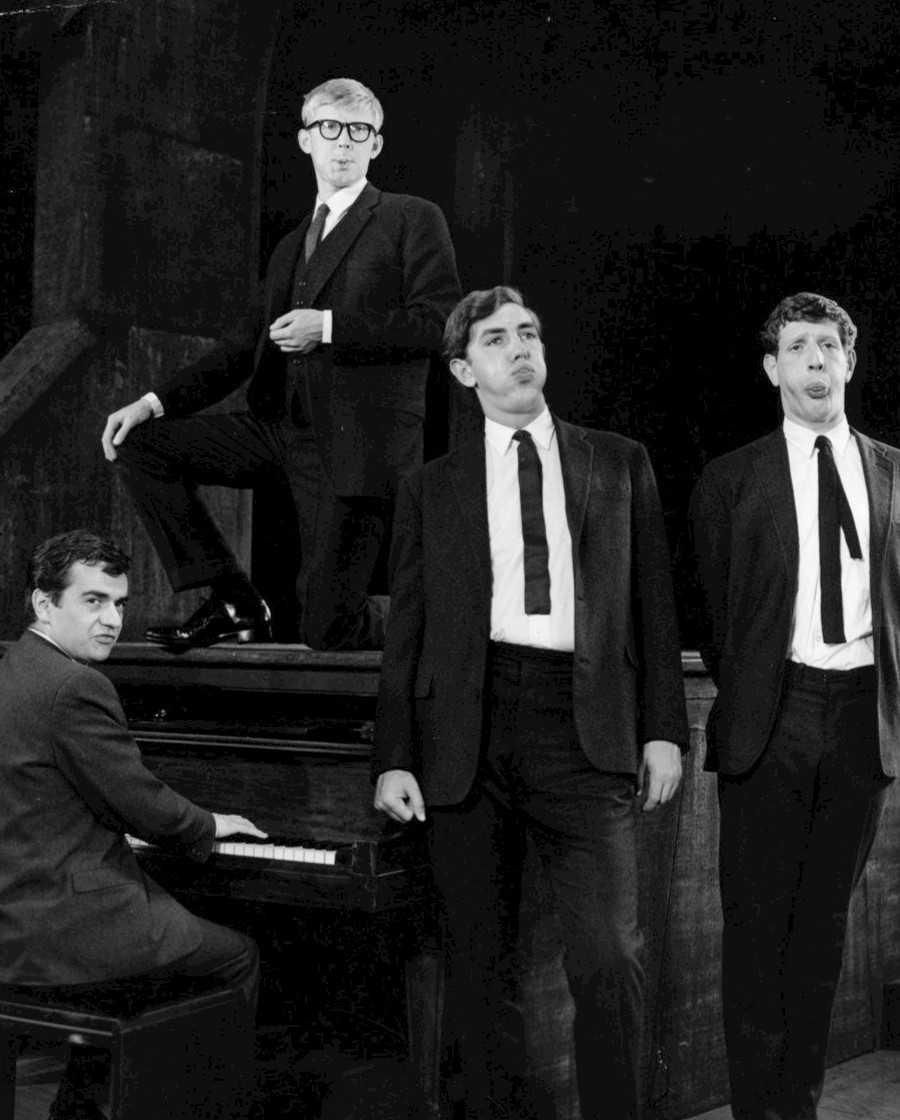
Moore (left) in Beyond the Fringe, c. 1963. Creating a boom in satirical comedy, thousands of shows were played on both sides of the Atlantic.

John Bassett, a graduate of Wadham College, Oxford, recommended Moore, his jazz bandmate and a rising cabaret talent, to producer Robert Ponsonby, who was putting together a comedy revue entitled Beyond the Fringe. Bassett also chose Jonathan Miller. Moore then recommended Alan Bennett, who in turn suggested Peter Cook.

Beyond the Fringe was at the forefront of the 1960s UK satire boom, although the show's original runs in Edinburgh and the provinces in 1960 had had a lukewarm response. When the revue transferred to the Fortune Theatre in London, in a revised production by Donald Albery and William Donaldson, it became a sensation, thanks in some part to a favourable review by Kenneth Tynan. There were also a number of musical items in the show, using Dudley Moore's music, most famously an arrangement of the Colonel Bogey March in the style of Beethoven, which Moore appears unable to bring to an end.

In 1962 the show transferred to the John Golden Theatre in New York, with its original cast. President John F. Kennedy attended a performance on 10 February 1963. The show continued in New York until 1964.

=== Partnership with Peter Cook ===
John Dankworth's trumpeter, Ron Simmonds, remembered the duo playing in the intervals of the band's Saturday night residency at the Marquee Club in 1961.

When Moore returned to the UK he was offered his own series on the BBC, Not Only... But Also (1965, 1966, 1970). It was commissioned specifically as a vehicle for Moore, but when he invited Peter Cook on as a guest, their comedy partnership was so notable that it became a permanent fixture of the series. Cook and Moore are most remembered for their sketches as two working-class men, Pete and Dud, in macs and cloth caps, commenting on politics and the arts, but they also fashioned a series of one-off characters, usually with Moore in the role of interviewer to one of Cook's upper-class eccentrics.

The pair developed an unorthodox method for scripting the material, using a tape recorder to tape an ad-libbed routine that they would then have transcribed and edited. This would not leave enough time to fully rehearse the script, so they often had a set of cue cards. Moore was famous for "corpsing" so, as the programmes often went out live, Cook would deliberately make him laugh to get an even bigger reaction from the studio audience. The BBC wiped much of the series, though some of the soundtracks (which were issued on LP record) have survived. In 1968 Cook and Moore briefly switched to ATV for four one-hour programmes entitled Goodbye Again; however, they were not as critically well-received as the BBC shows.

On film, Moore and Cook appeared in the 1966 British comedy film The Wrong Box, before co-writing and co-starring in Bedazzled (1967) with Eleanor Bron. Set in Swinging London of the 1960s, Bedazzled was directed by Stanley Donen. The pair closed the decade with appearances in the ensemble caper film Monte Carlo or Bust and Richard Lester's The Bed Sitting Room, based on the play by Spike Milligan and John Antrobus. In 1968 and 1969 Moore embarked on two solo comedy ventures, firstly in the film 30 is a Dangerous Age, Cynthia and secondly, on stage, for an Anglicised adaptation of Woody Allen's Play It Again, Sam at the Globe Theatre in London's West End, In 1989, he narrated the US version of the 1989 film The Adventures of Milo & Otis

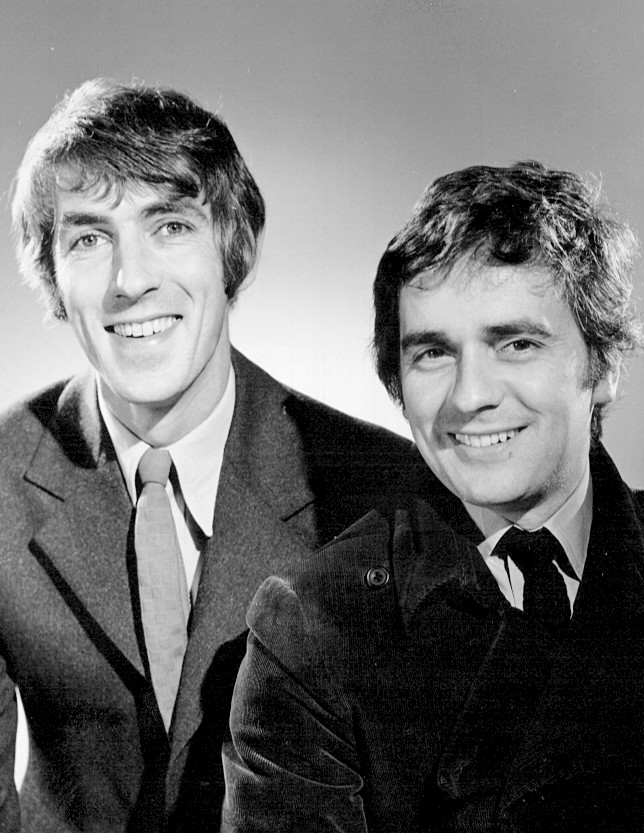
Moore (right) with Peter Cook in 1969. Their success was based on the contrast between Moore's buffoonery and Cook's deadpan monologues.

In the 1970s, the relationship between Moore and Cook became increasingly strained as the latter's alcoholism began affecting his work. In 1971, however, Cook and Moore took sketches from Not Only....But Also and Goodbye Again, together with new material, to create the stage revue Behind the Fridge. This show toured Australia and New Zealand in 1971 and ran in London's west end between 1972 and 1973 before transferring to New York City in 1973, re-titled Good Evening. Cook frequently appeared inebriated, on and off stage. Nonetheless, the show proved very popular and it won Tony and Grammy Awards.

When the Broadway run of Good Evening ended, Moore stayed on in the U.S. to pursue his film acting ambitions in Hollywood, but the pair reunited to host Saturday Night Live on 24 January 1976 during SNL's first season. They performed a number of their classic stage routines, including "One Leg Too Few" and "Frog and Peach", among others, in addition to participating in some skits with the show's ensemble.

It was during the Broadway run of Good Evening that Cook persuaded Moore to take the humour of Pete and Dud further on long-playing records as Derek and Clive. Chris Blackwell circulated bootleg copies to friends in the music business and the popularity of the recording convinced Cook to release it commercially as Derek and Clive (Live) (1976). Two further "Derek and Clive" albums, Derek and Clive Come Again (1977) and Derek and Clive Ad Nauseam (1978), were later released. The latter was also filmed for a documentary, Derek and Clive Get the Horn. In the film it is clear tensions between the two men were at a breaking point, with Moore at one point walking out of the recording room singing, 'Breaking up is so easy to do.' In 2009, it came to light that, at the time, there were attempts to have them prosecuted under obscenity laws for their "Derek and Clive" comedy recordings.

The last significant appearance for the partnership was in 1978's The Hound of the Baskervilles, where Moore played Dr. Watson to Cook's Sherlock Holmes, as well as three other roles: in drag; as a one-legged man; and at the start and end of the film as a flamboyant and mischievous pianist. He also wrote the film's score. Co-star Terry-Thomas described it as "the most outrageous film I ever appeared in ... there was no magic ... it was bad!". The film was not a success, either critically or financially.

Moore and Cook eventually reunited for the annual American benefit for the homeless, Comic Relief, in 1987, and again in 1989 for a British audience at the Amnesty International benefit The Secret Policeman's Biggest Ball.

Moore was deeply affected by the death of Cook in 1995, and for weeks would regularly telephone Cook's home in London, just to hear his friend's voice on the telephone answering machine. Moore attended Cook's memorial service in London and, at the time, many people who knew him noted that Moore was behaving strangely and attributed it to grief or drinking. In November 1995, Moore teamed up with friend and humorist Martin Lewis in organising a two-day salute to Cook in Los Angeles that Moore co-hosted with Lewis.

Shortly after Moore's death, in December 2004, the Channel 4 television station in the United Kingdom broadcast Not Only But Always, a TV film dramatising the relationship between Moore and Cook, although most of the attention of the production was directed towards Cook. Around the same time, the relationship between the two was also the subject of a stage play called Pete and Dud: Come Again by Chris Bartlett and Nick Awde. For this production Moore is the main subject. Set in a chat-show studio in the 1980s, it concerns Moore's comic and personal relationship with Cook and the directions their careers took after the split of the partnership.

=== Music ===
During the 1960s Moore formed the Dudley Moore Trio, with drummer Chris Karan and bassist Pete McGurk. Following McGurk's suicide in June 1968, Peter Morgan joined the group as his replacement.

Moore's admitted principal musical influences were Oscar Peterson and Erroll Garner. In an interview he recalled the day he finally mastered Garner's unique left-hand strum and was so excited that he walked around for several days with his left hand constantly playing that cadence. His early recordings included "My Blue Heaven", "Lysie Does It", "Poova Nova", "Take Your Time", "Indiana", "Sooz Blooz", "Baubles, Bangles & Beads", "Sad One for George" and "Autumn Leaves". The trio performed regularly on British television, made numerous recordings and had a long-running residency at Peter Cook's London nightclub, the Establishment. Among other albums, they recorded The Dudley Moore Trio, Dudley Moore plays The Theme from Beyond the Fringe and All That Jazz, The World of Dudley Moore, The Other Side Of Dudley Moore and Genuine Dud.

Moore was a close friend of record producer Chris Gunning and played piano (uncredited) on the 1969 single "Broken Hearted Pirates" which Gunning produced for Simon Dupree and the Big Sound. In 1976 he played piano on Larry Norman's album In Another Land, in particular on the song The Sun Began to Rain. In 1981 he recorded Smilin' Through with Cleo Laine.

He composed the soundtracks for the films Bedazzled (1967), 30 is a Dangerous Age, Cynthia (1968), Inadmissible Evidence (1968), Staircase (1969), The Hound of the Baskervilles (1978) and Six Weeks (1982), among others.

=== Later career in film, television and music ===
In the late 1970s Moore moved to Hollywood, where he had a supporting role in the hit film Foul Play (1978) with Goldie Hawn and Chevy Chase. The following year saw his break-out role in Blake Edwards's 10, which became one of the biggest box-office hits of 1979 and gave him an unprecedented status as a romantic leading man. Moore followed up with the comedy film Wholly Moses!, which was not a major success.

In 1981 Moore appeared in the title role of the comedy Arthur, an even bigger hit than 10. Co-starring Liza Minnelli and Sir John Gielgud, it was both commercially and critically successful, Moore receiving an Oscar nomination for Best Actor, while Gielgud won the Best Supporting Actor Oscar for his role as Arthur's stern but compassionate manservant. Moore lost to Henry Fonda (for On Golden Pond). He did, however, win a Golden Globe award for Best Actor in a Musical/Comedy. In the same year, on British television, Moore was the featured guest subject on An Audience With....

His subsequent films, Six Weeks (1982), Lovesick (1983), Romantic Comedy (1983) and Unfaithfully Yours (1984) were only moderate successes. He won another Golden Globe for Best Actor in a Musical/Comedy in 1984, starring in the Blake Edwards directed Micki & Maude, co-starring Amy Irving.

Later films, including Best Defense (1984), Santa Claus: The Movie (1985), The Adventures of Milo & Otis (1989), Like Father Like Son (1987), Arthur 2: On the Rocks (1988), a sequel to the original, Crazy People (1990), Blame It on the Bellboy (1992) and an animated adaptation of King Kong, were inconsistent in terms of both critical and commercial reception. Moore eventually disowned the Arthur sequel, but, in later years, Cook would tease him by claiming he preferred Arthur 2: On the Rocks to Arthur.

In 1986 he once again hosted Saturday Night Live, albeit without Peter Cook this time.

Moore was the subject of the British This Is Your Life, for a second time, in March 1987 when he was surprised by Eamonn Andrews at his Venice Beach restaurant; he had previously been honoured by the programme in December 1972.

In addition to acting, Moore continued to work as a composer and pianist, writing scores for a number of films and giving piano concerts, among the highlights of which were his popular parodies of classical favourites. He appeared as Ko-Ko in Jonathan Miller's production of The Mikado in Los Angeles in March 1988. He appeared on Kenny G's music video "Against Doctor's Orders" from the album Silhouette.

In 1991 he released the album Songs Without Words and in 1992 Live From an Aircraft Hangar, recorded at London's Royal Albert Hall.

He collaborated with the conductor Sir Georg Solti in 1991 to create a Channel 4 television series, Orchestra!, which was designed to introduce audiences to the symphony orchestra. He later worked with the American conductor Michael Tilson Thomas on a similar television series, Concerto! (1993), likewise designed to introduce audiences to classical music concertos.

Moore appeared in two series for CBS, Dudley (1993) and Daddy's Girls (1994); however, both were cancelled before the end of their run.

Moore had been interviewed for the New York Times in 1987 by the music critic Rena Fruchter, herself an accomplished pianist, and the two became close friends. By 1995 Moore's film career was on the wane and he was having trouble remembering his lines, a problem he had never previously encountered. It was for this reason he was sacked from Barbra Streisand's film The Mirror Has Two Faces. However, his difficulties were, in fact, due to the onset of the medical condition that eventually led to his death. Opting to concentrate on the piano, he enlisted Fruchter as an artistic partner. They performed as a duo in the US and Australia. However, his disease soon started to make itself apparent there as well, as his fingers would not always do what he wanted them to do. Further symptoms such as slurred speech and loss of balance were misinterpreted by the public and the media as a sign of drunkenness. Moore himself was at a loss to explain this. He moved into Fruchter's family home in New Jersey and stayed there for five years; however, this placed a great strain both on her marriage and her friendship with Moore, and she later set him up in the house next door.

== Restaurant ==
Tony Bill and Dudley Moore founded a restaurant in 1983 (closed in November 2000), 72 Market Street Oyster Bar and Grill, in Venice, California.

== Personal life ==
Moore was married and divorced four times: to actresses Suzy Kendall (15 June 1968 – 15 September 1972); Tuesday Weld (20 September 1975 – 18 July 1980), with whom he had a son, Patrick, on 26 February 1976; Brogan Lane (21 February 1988 – 1991); and Nicole Rothschild (16 April 1994 – 1998), with whom he had a son, Nicholas, on 28 June 1995.

In 1994, Moore was arrested and charged with domestic assault after allegedly assaulting his then-girlfriend and soon-to-be wife, Nicole Rothschild.

He maintained good relationships with Kendall, Weld, and Lane. He expressly forbade Rothschild from attending his funeral because at the time his illness became apparent, he was going through a difficult divorce with her, while still sharing a Los Angeles house with her and her previous husband.

== Illness and death ==
In April 1997, after spending five days in a New York hospital, Moore was informed that he had calcium deposits in the basal ganglia of his brain and irreversible frontal lobe damage. He underwent quadruple coronary artery bypass surgery in London and also suffered four strokes.

On 30 September 1999, Moore announced that he was suffering from the terminal degenerative brain disorder progressive supranuclear palsy (PSP), a Parkinson-plus syndrome. As some of its early symptoms are very similar to intoxication, he had been reported as being drunk. However, the illness had been diagnosed earlier that year. In November 1999, Moore made his first public appearance since disclosing his illness, reading poetry, alongside Julie Andrews, at a benefit concert in Philadelphia for the charity Music for All Seasons. At first Moore struggled, but soon he settled in and began to joke and ad-lib. He then received a standing ovation, for what was to be his last performance. His disease would quickly progress, eventually requiring him to use a wheelchair.

Moore died on the morning of 27 March 2002 as a result of pneumonia, secondary to immobility caused by his PSP, in Plainfield, New Jersey, at the age of 66. Rena Fruchter was holding his hand when he died; she reported his final words were "I can hear the music all around me." Moore was buried at Hillside Cemetery in Scotch Plains, New Jersey. Fruchter later wrote a memoir of their relationship titled Dudley Moore (Ebury Press, 2004).

== Filmography ==
=== Film ===
Film performances
Year	Title	Role	Notes
1961	The Third Alibi	Piano Accompanist	Uncredited
1965	Flatland	A. Square	Voice role
1966	The Wrong Box	John Finsbury	
1967	Bedazzled	Stanley Moon	
1968	30 is a Dangerous Age, Cynthia	Rupert Street	
1969	Monte Carlo or Bust!	Lt. Barrington	(aka Those Daring Young Men in Their Jaunty Jalopies)
1969	The Bed Sitting Room	Police Sergeant	
1972	Alice's Adventures in Wonderland	Dormouse	
1975	Saturday Night at the Baths	Himself – in theatre audience	uncredited role
1978	Foul Play	Stanley Tibbets	
1978	The Hound of the Baskervilles	Doctor Watson / Mrs. Ada Holmes / Mr. Spiggot / Piano Player	
1979	10	George Webber	
1979	Derek and Clive Get the Horn	Derek	
1980	Wholly Moses!	Harvey Orchid / Herschel	
1981	Arthur	Arthur Bach	
1982	Six Weeks	Patrick Dalton	
1983	Lovesick	Saul Benjamin	
1983	Romantic Comedy	Jason Carmichael	
1984	Unfaithfully Yours	Claude Eastman	
1984	Best Defense	Wylie Cooper	
1984	Micki & Maude	Rob Salinger	
1985	Santa Claus: The Movie	Patch	
1987	Like Father Like Son	Dr. Jack Hammond / Chris Hammond	
1988	Arthur 2: On the Rocks	Arthur Bach	
1989	The Adventures of Milo and Otis	Narrator	
1990	Crazy People	Emory Leeson	
1992	Blame It on the Bellboy	Melvyn Orton	
1993	The Pickle	Planet Cleveland Man	(uncredited)
1995	The Disappearance of Kevin Johnson	Himself	
1998	The Mighty Kong	Carl Denham / King Kong (voice)	(final film role)

=== Television ===
Television shows
Year	Title	Role	Notes
1964	Chronicle	Piano Accompanist	Episode: "A Trip to the Moon"
1964	Love Story	Kuba	Episode: "The Girl Opposite"
1965–1970	Not Only... But Also	Various characters	22 episodes
1966	Five More	Maserati Driver	Episode: "Exit 19"
1968	Film Reviews	Rupert Street	Episode: "Backs British Films"
1968	Goodbye Again	various characters	4 episodes
1969	World in Ferment	Guest Store Detective	Episode: "1.1"
1971	Not Only But Also. Peter Cook and Dudley Moore in Australia	Various characters	Mini series
1971	An Apple a Day	Dr. Clive Elwood	TV movie
1971	Behind the Fridge	Various characters	TV movie
1975	When Things Were Rotten	Sheik Achmed	Episode: "Those Wedding Bell Blues"
1976	NBC's Saturday Night	Co-host	1 episode
1976	Pleasure at Her Majesty's	Narrator	TV movie documentary
1992	Noel's House Party	Special Guest	Episode: "1.15"
1992-1994	Shelley Duvall's Bedtime Stories	Narrator	1 episode
1993	Dudley	Dudley Bristol	6 episodes
1993–1996	Really Wild Animals	Spin	13 episodes
1994	Parallel Lives	Imaginary Friend / President Andrews	TV movie
1994	Daddy's Girls	Dudley Walker	3 episodes
1995	Oscar's Orchestra	Oscar (voice)	38 episodes
1996	A Weekend in the Country	Simon Farrell	TV movie

== Honours and accolades ==
Organisations	Year	Category	Nominated work	Result	Ref.
Academy Awards	1981	Best Actor	Arthur	Nominated	
BAFTA Award	1966	Best Light Entertainment Performance	Not Only... But Also (with Peter Cook)	Won	
Golden Globe Awards	1978	Best Supporting Actor – Motion Picture	Foul Play	Nominated	
Golden Globe Awards	1979	Best Actor in a Motion Picture – Musical or Comedy	10	Nominated	
Golden Globe Awards	1981	Best Actor in a Motion Picture - Musical or Comedy	Arthur	Won	
Golden Globe Awards	1982	Best Original Score	Six Weeks	Nominated	
Golden Globe Awards	1984	Best Actor in a Motion Picture - Musical or Comedy	Micki & Maude	Won	
Grammy Awards	1963	Best Original Cast Show Album	Beyond the Fringe	Nominated	
Grammy Awards	1963	Best Comedy Album	Beyond the Fringe	Nominated	
Grammy Awards	1975	Best Spoken Word Album	Good Evening	Nominated	
Grammy Awards	1986	Best Recording for Children	Prokofiev: Peter and the Wolf	Nominated	
Tony Awards	1963	Special Tony Award	Beyond the Fringe	Honored	
Tony Awards	1974	Special Tony Award	Good Evening	Honored	
Hollywood Walk of Fame	1987	Motion Picture Star	Himself	Honored	
Queen Elizabeth II	2001	Commander of the Order of The British Empire (CBE)	Himself (Note: Despite his deteriorating condition, he attended the ceremony at Buckingham Palace on 16 November to collect his honour in a wheelchair. It was his last public appearance.)	Honored	

== Discography ==
=== UK chart singles ===
- "Goodbye-ee" b/w "Not Only But Also", 1965, Peter Cook and Dudley Moore / The Dudley Moore Trio (Decca Records (UK) F.12158)
- "The Ballad of Spotty Muldoon", 1965, Peter Cook and Dudley Moore

=== Jazz discography ===
- "Strictly for the Birds" b/w "Duddly Dell", 1961 (Parlophone R 4772) – The Dudley Moore Trio (Derek Hogg, drums; Hugo Boyd, double bass)
- The Other Side of Dudley Moore, 1965 (Decca LK 4732 Mono) The Dudley Moore Trio (Pete McGurk – double bass, Chris Karan – drums)
- Genuine Dud, 1966 (Decca LK 4788 Mono) The Dudley Moore Trio (Pete McGurk – double bass, Chris Karan – drums) [reissued as The World of Dudley Moore, vol 2, 1973]
- From Beyond The Fringe, 1966 (Atlantic RecordsStandard 2 017)
- The Dudley Moore Trio, 1969 (Decca Records (UK) / London Records (US) PS558)
- Dudley Moore plays the Theme from Beyond the Fringe and All That Jazz, 1962 (Atlantic 1403)
- The World of Dudley Moore, (Decca SPA 106)
- The Music of Dudley Moore, (EMI Australia (Cube Records) TOOFA.14-1/2)
- Dudley Down Under, (Cube ICS 13)
- Dudley Moore at the Wavendon Festival, (Black Lion Records BLP 12151)
- Smilin' Through – Cleo Laine and Dudley Moore, (Finesse Records FW 38091)
- "Strictly for the Birds" – Cleo Laine and Dudley Moore, (CBS A 2947)
- The Theme from Beyond The Fringe and All That Jazz, (Collectibles COL 6625)
- Live from an Aircraft Hangar (Martine Avenue Productions MAPI 8486)
- Songs Without Words, 1991 (GRP/BMG LC 6713)
- The First Orchestrations – Dudley Moore and Richard Rodney Bennett, played by John Bassett and his Band, (Harkit Records HRKCD 8054)
- Jazz Jubilee, (Martine Avenue Productions MAPI 1521)
- The Dudley Moore Trio at Sydney Town Hall, 2 May 1978 (with Peter Morgan on bass and Chris Karan on drums). Produced by Peter Wall.
- Today, The Dudley Moore Trio – again with Morgan and Karan (see above) recorded at United Sound, Sydney, in 1971, with some mono tracks added from a 1961 London session. No details.

=== Comedy discography ===
- Beyond The Fringe (West End recording) (1961)
- Beyond The Fringe (Broadway recording) (1962)
- Not Only Peter Cook But Also Dudley Moore (1965)
- Once Moore with Cook (1966)
- Peter Cook and Dudley Moore Cordially Invite You to Go to Hell! (1967)
- Goodbye Again (1968)
- Not Only But Also (1971)
- Behind the Fridge (1971) AUS No. 35
- The World of Pete & Dud (1974)
- Good Evening (1974)
- Derek and Clive (Live) (1976)
- Derek and Clive Come Again (1977)
- Derek and Clive Ad Nauseam (1978)

== Bibliography ==
- Dudley Moore (1966). Originals. Arranged as Piano Solos Transcribed from the Decca L.P. 'The Other Side of Dudley Moore'. Essex Music.
