= Greedy reductionism =

Kind of erroneous reductionism

Greedy reductionism, identified by Daniel Dennett, in his 1995 book Darwin's Dangerous Idea, is a kind of erroneous reductionism. Whereas "good" reductionism means explaining a thing in terms of what it reduces to (for example, its parts and their interactions), greedy reductionism occurs when "in their eagerness for a bargain, in their zeal to explain too much too fast, scientists and philosophers ... underestimate the complexities, trying to skip whole layers or levels of theory in their rush to fasten everything securely and neatly to the foundation". Using the terminology of "cranes" (legitimate, mechanistic explanations) and "skyhooks" (essentially, fake—e.g. supernaturalistic—explanations) built up earlier in the chapter, Dennett recapitulates his initial definition of the term in the chapter summary on p. 83: "Good reductionists suppose that all Design can be explained without skyhooks; greedy reductionists suppose it can all be explained without cranes."

== Examples ==
A canonical example of greedy reductionism, labelled as such by Dennett himself, is the (radical) behaviorism of B. F. Skinner. It is often said of this school of thought (which dominated the field of psychology, at least in the Anglo-American world, for part of the twentieth century) that it denied the existence of mental states such as beliefs, although at least in Skinner's original version it merely denied the theoretical utility (or necessity) of postulating such states in order to explain behavior. Notably, Skinner himself characterized his views as anti-reductionist: in Beyond Freedom and Dignity and other works (e.g. About Behaviorism and chapter 19 of Verbal Behavior), he wrote that while mental and neurological states did exist, behavior could be explained without recourse to either. As Dennett says, "Skinner proclaimed that one simple iteration of the fundamental Darwinian process—operant conditioning—could account for all mentality, all learning, not just in pigeons but in human beings. ... Skinner was a greedy reductionist, trying to explain all the design (and design power) in a single stroke".

In his earlier book Consciousness Explained, Dennett argued that, without denying that human consciousness exists, we can understand it as coming about from the coordinated activity of many components in the brain that are themselves unconscious. In response, critics accused him of "explaining away" consciousness because he disputes the existence of certain conceptions of consciousness that he considers overblown and incompatible with what is physically possible. This is perhaps what motivated Dennett to make the greedy/good distinction in his follow-up book, to freely admit that reductionism can go overboard while pointing out that not all reductionism goes this far.

A departure from strict reductionism in the opposite direction from greedy reductionism is called nonreductive physicalism. Nonreductive physicalists deny that a reductionistic analysis of a conscious system like the human mind is sufficient to explain all of the phenomena which are characteristic of that system. This idea is expressed in some theories that say consciousness is an emergent epiphenomenon that cannot be reduced to physiological properties of neurons. Those nonreductive physicalists, such as Colin McGinn, who claim the true relationship between the physical and the mental may be beyond scientific understanding—and therefore a "mystery"—have been dubbed mysterians by Owen Flanagan.

== Nothing-buttery ==
An older name for 'greedy reductionism' is "nothing-buttery", an expression based on the repeated phrase "such-and-such is nothing but...". For example, in the article title, "Consciousness is Nothing But a Word".

This 1955 example of the phrase demonstrates its use in its characteristic context:

Yet one occasionally hears it said that the brain is nothing but a machine. The assertion is usually made in a slurring tone which implies that the brain has been overrated in some unspecified way and is supposed to put an end to further discussion. One investigator calls this "nothing buttery" thinking. It is certainly a grave insult to the brain—and to the machines.

The expression began to be used in US English from 1953, and in UK English from the beginning of the 1960s. Its usage peaked in about 1970, but the phrase continues to be used up to the present.

The related expression "nothing-but-ism" appeared earlier, in the 1930s. One of its earliest documented uses was in a 1935 review by W. J. H. Sprott of Carl Jung's book Man in Search of a Soul in the journal Mind. Sprott praised Jung's book because "it does not attempt to explain away spiritual aspiration, the antithesis of 'nothing-but'-ism".

Although in the 1970s the phrase "nothing-buttery" had already been in use for at least twenty years, it is often associated with the scholar Donald Mackay, who popularized its use at that time and debated publicly with B. F. Skinner.

== See also ==
- Contextualism
- Fallacy of division
- Golden hammer
- Holism
- Mereological nihilism
- Monism
