= A Rough History of Disbelief =

- PBS (United States) version: Atheism: A Brief History of Disbelief
- Written by: Jonathan Miller
- Directed by: Richard Denton
- Presented by: Jonathan Miller
- Theme music composer: Evelyn Glennie
- Country of origin: United Kingdom
- Original language: English
- No. of series: 1
- No. of episodes: 3

Production
- Producer: Richard Denton
- Editor: Richard Fretwell
- Running time: 180 mins (3 × 60 mins each)
- Production company: PBS

Original release
- Network: BBC Four
- Release: 11 October 2004 (UK); 4 May 2007 (US)

Related
- The Atheism Tapes

A Rough History of Disbelief — known in the United States as Atheism: A Brief History of Disbelief — is a 2004 television documentary series written and presented by Jonathan Miller for the BBC and tracing the history of atheism. It was first shown on BBC Four and was repeated on BBC Two. It was first shown in the U.S. on PBS in 2007.

The series includes interviews of Arthur Miller, Richard Dawkins, Steven Weinberg, Colin McGinn, Denys Turner, Pascal Boyer and Daniel Dennett giving their views on disbelief. Also presented are historical quotations from a range of atheists, agnostics and deists, read by Bernard Hill.

The series consists of three 60-minute episodes:

- "Shadows of Doubt"
- "Noughts and Crosses"
- "The Final Hour"

A series of six supplementary programmes was made from material that did not make it into the original episodes; this was dubbed The Atheism Tapes.

== Content ==
The bulk of the presentation is a historical review of atheism in the West with asides to the author's personal experience. Miller notes, as is implicit in the title, how only recently atheism was publicly acknowledged in the modern West, with none willing to state flat rejection of religious beliefs until Baron d'Holbach (1723–1789). He examines why d'Holbach is not better known or celebrated.

The first episode, "Shadows of Doubt", starts with Miller in the Reading Room at the British Museum describing the purpose of the series, and gives a brief montage of the interviewees. Miller starts his journey in New York City and states that the attacks of 11 September 2001 were "inconceivable without religion". Miller goes on to describe how he is conducting the series to explore the history of atheism, but he says he is rather "reluctant" to call himself an atheist because "it hardly seems worthwhile having a name for something which scarcely enters my thoughts at all". There follows a brief montage of people explaining their atheism: Sir Geoffrey Lloyd, Polly Toynbee, Gore Vidal, Steven Weinberg and Colin McGinn. Miller then describes his Jewish upbringing sitting in the pews of the New London Synagogue in St John's Wood.

In order to explore the philosophy of what it is people are talking about when they discuss beliefs, Miller talks to Colin McGinn, who notes that the word belief covers things as diverse as "I believe there is a table in front of me" to "I believe in democracy", and also argues that beliefs are dispositional or implicit rather than occurrent. McGinn goes on to explain that the question of beliefs only comes up when one is faced with a question which is debatable, and gives religion and politics as examples. Miller then states that politics differs from religion in being about what ought to be, while religion primarily deals with what is the case.

Miller then asks whether it is possible to bring about belief voluntarily (an issue philosophers refer to as doxastic voluntarism).

== American broadcast ==
Broadcast of the series in the United States was delayed until 2007. PBS's usual corporate sponsors were not enthusiastic about the series. After a title change (including removal of the word "atheism"), the series was finally underwritten by the Center for Inquiry, the American Ethical Union, the American Humanist Association, the Institute for Humanist Studies, and the Harold K. Hochschild Foundation.

== Soundtrack ==
The program features a percussion score by Evelyn Glennie, wherein the main themes are Paul Smadbeck's "Rhythm Song" and Keiko Abe's "Mi-Chi" (from Rhythm Song, 1990). Other tracks are "Shadow Behind the Iron Sun", "The Council", "First Contact", "Warrior's Chant" and "Wind Horse" (from Shadow Behind the Iron Sun, 1999).

== See also ==
- History of atheism
- New Atheism
