= International adoption of Romanian children =

The international adoption of Romanian children began in December 1989, with the ousting of dictator Nicolae Ceaușescu, in reaction to the orphan crisis caused by bans on contraception and abortion. In total, around 31,000 children were adopted to foreign parents, the majority before 2001. A ban on foreign adoption went into place on 1 January, 2005.

The early years of international adoption from Romania were largely unregulated, with unethical practices abounding. Some children were adopted without their family's permission; others were sold by their families to unscrupulous agencies. After adoption, many children struggled due to the substandard care or neglect they received in orphanages.

As international adoptees from Romania came of age, some began undertaking efforts to reconnect to their birth families and to document and publicize the events surrounding their adoptions.

== History ==
Around 30,000 Romanian children were adopted by foreign parents between 1989 and 2001. About 3,000 adoptions were finalized in 1990 alone. By 1991, nearly 7,000 children had already been adopted. Many of these children were adopted by U.S. citizens; according to the Immigration and Naturalization Service, "2,287 Romanian children were adopted by Americans from Oct. 1, 1990 to Sept. 4, 1991". In total, around 31,000 children were adopted to foreign parents, the majority before 2001. The President Hotel in Bucharest served as "the unofficial headquarters" for foreigners coming to Romania to adopt.

=== Children's demographics ===
In 1989 and 1990, the majority of adopted children were healthy infants. By 1991, "the pool of children eligible for adoption [had] shrunk considerably," as access to birth control in Romania improved. Many children remaining in state institutions had physical disabilities or had been exposed to hepatitis B or HIV. The majority of children living in state institutions were also not technically legally abandoned, as some birth parents used orphanages as a form of child care if they were unable to provide for their children; parental rights were terminated after six months without a visit.

Many Romanian orphans were Romani, and stigma against the ethnicity resulted in few Romani children being adopted by Romanians.

=== Unregulated adoption ===
The early days of adoption from Romania were largely unregulated, which worsened as orphanages adopted out the majority of their healthy infants. Prospective adoptive parents reported multiple issues with paperwork and bureaucracy, including being given false documents by private agencies, or being matched with children later found to not be legally abandoned. In some cases, adoptive parents paid money directly to birth parents to convince them to give up their child for adoption. This phenomenon was intensified by cash shortages in the country. In turn, new adoption agencies in North America and Western Europe, in coordination with local Romanians (including lawyers and healthcare workers), formed to profit on the situation. It was not uncommon for potential adopters to provide bribes, sometimes in the form of material goods like nail polish, makeup, razors, or candy, to adoption officials or birth families. Misinformation regarding a child's background, birth family's situation, or Romanian policy was also reported. Some birth mothers reported having their children taken by healthcare workers, with claims they died at birth. Other birth families reported being barred from visiting their children who had been left in orphanages temporarily, so the children could be classified as abandoned and be adopted out.

=== Formation of the National Adoption Committee ===
In early 1991, international media publicized an incident in which three Romani children were sold to undercover journalists; in response, the Romanian government formed the National Adoption Committee. The head of the committee, pediatrician Dr. Alexandra Zugravescu, "ordered an immediate census of all orphanages, and an official list of all children who are clear candidates for adoption," and called on the Romanian Parliament "to establish legal criteria for abandonment". Although Zugravescu recognized that regulation would not necessarily stop unethical practices, such as doctors covering up adoptions, she hoped that prospective adoptive parents would choose to adopt legally if given the option.

In June 1991, foreign adoptions were suspended while the Romanian government drafted new adoption regulations. In July 1991, a new adoption law was passed, although foreign adoptions remained suspended while the National Adoption Committee reviewed adoption agencies. The new law eliminated private adoptions and gave priority to Romanian families. Some adopters, whose adoptions had not been officially recognized before the adoption suspension, smuggled children out of Romania and completed adoptions in neighboring countries; others remained in Romania, waiting for courts to decide the status of their cases.

Even after foreign adoptions were officially re-opened, with a legal avenue through state authorities, illegal adoptions continued to occur as late as 2000.

=== Adoption moratorium and ban ===
In 2001, a moratorium on adoptions by foreigners was put into place. The moratorium was sparked by concerns by the European Union that "the system was corrupt and children were being sold to foreigners". An October 2001 report by "a Romanian government commission set up to combat widespread corruption in the international adoption business," found a "catalogue of horrors," including adoptions funding gangs, children suspected of being trafficked into "prostitution and slave rings," and healthcare workers abducting children at birth, after telling birth mothers their child had died. They also found instances where children's names were changed or swapped, and where Romanian families were unable to adopt because they had less money than foreign adopters. The commission further found that money paid by foreign adopters went illegally to middlemen, rather than into improving child welfare, as was required by law.

Around 1,000 adoptions were finalized between 2001 and 2004, most of which had been initiated before the moratorium went into place. A ban on foreign adoptions was passed in 2004, with an exception made for biological grandparents living outside Romania. The ban went into effect on January 1, 2005.

Studies have suggested that true de-institutionalization of children in Romania did not occur until after the ban on international adoptions.

== Lives of adoptees abroad ==
A 1997 study of Romanian children adopted by Canadians "found that 65 percent of the children studied had serious problems more than three years after coming to Canada and that 33 percent of their parents needed help or counselling because they felt like failures". Problems experienced by the children included "hyperactivity, low intelligence, an inability to make an attachment to anyone, delayed learning, difficult relations with other children (ranging from withdrawal to aggression) and repetitive behavior, such as constant rocking". Another study conducted that year, also on children adopted by Canadians, found that children who had lived in orphanages for longer were more likely to experience more severe problems.

In 2005, the U.S.-based organization Parents' Network for the Post-Institutionalized Child (PNPIC) reported that about 30% of children adopted to the U.S. from Romania had "severe problems".

A 2006 report on Romanian children adopted to the U.K. found that most children were physically healthy, but "nearly one‐third of the children from Romania placed in UK families after the age of six months received mental health services provision ‐ a rate far higher than the 11 to 15% in the groups adopted before the age of six months".

=== English and Romanian Adoptee (ERA) Project ===
British child psychologists Michael Rutter and Edmund Sonuga-Barke established the English and Romanian Adoptee (ERA) Project at King's College London. The project tracked 165 children who had been adopted to the United Kingdom from Romania in the early 1990s. As a control, 52 children adopted domestically within the U.K., who had not lived in institutions, were also studied.

All 165, who were infants when they were adopted, initially showed developmental delays. Although the children showed large gains by age four, many of the studied children had not caught up to normal development by age eleven.

The follow-up 2008 study found that "the majority of the adopted young people had an interest in Romania and expressed a wish to visit their country of origin...there was no association between this interest in Romanian identity and levels of self-esteem". Researchers did find that those who considered themselves Romanian "had both lower self-esteem and a higher level of deprivation-specific problems"; however, "the majority of the adoptees saw themselves as English or Anglo-Romanian".

A follow up report in 2017 on the 165 children found that 80% of the adoptees surveyed reported health impacts from trauma and substandard care, while 20% felt unaffected.

== Reconnection to Romania ==
As Romanian adoptees have come of age, some have sought to find their birth families or reconnect with their birth culture. In Romania, the National Authority for Child Protection and Adoptions (ANPDCA) "routinely receives requests for information about adoptions," with 755 adoptees requesting assistance between 2021 and 2023. Some birth families have also reached out to ANPDCA to attempt to establish contact with children adopted abroad. However, some Romanian adoptees have criticized what they deem overcomplicated bureaucracy that is largely inaccessible for those who do not speak Romanian.

Social media, such as Facebook pages, has served as a tool in these searches.

Some adoptees have proposed launching legal cases against the Romanian government, or against the governments of surrounding countries, for trafficking and/or illegal intercountry adoptions. In Switzerland, one grassroots effort has raised funds for Romanian adoptees unjustly separated from their birth families.
