= Colin McGinn =

British philosopher (born 1950)

- Born: 10 March 1950 (age 76); West Hartlepool, County Durham, England

Education
- Education: University of Manchester (BA, MA); Jesus College, Oxford (BPhil)

Philosophical work
- Era: Contemporary philosophy
- Region: Western philosophy
- School: Analytic philosophy
- Institutions: University College London; University of Oxford; Rutgers University; University of Miami
- Main interests: Philosophy of mind
- Notable ideas: New mysterianism (or transcendental naturalism), cognitive closure

Colin McGinn (born 10 March 1950) is a British philosopher. He has held teaching posts and professorships at University College London, the University of Oxford, Rutgers University, and the University of Miami.

McGinn is best known for his work in philosophy of mind, and in particular for what is known as new mysterianism, the idea that the human mind is not equipped to solve the problem of consciousness. He has written over 20 books on this and other areas of philosophy, including The Character of Mind (1982), The Problem of Consciousness (1991), Consciousness and Its Objects (2004), and The Meaning of Disgust (2011).

In 2013, McGinn resigned from his tenured position at the University of Miami after a graduate student accused him of sexual harassment. His resignation touched off a debate about the prevalence of sexism and sexual harassment within academic philosophy.

== Early life and education ==
McGinn was born in West Hartlepool, a town in County Durham, England. Several of his relatives, including both grandfathers, were miners. His father, Joseph, left school to become a miner but put himself through night school and became a building manager instead. McGinn was the eldest of three children, all boys. When he was three, the family moved to Gillingham, Kent, and eight years later to Blackpool, Lancashire. Having failed his 11-plus, he attended a technical school in Kent, then a secondary modern in Blackpool, but did well enough in his O-levels to transfer to the local grammar school for his A-levels.

In 1968, McGinn began a degree in psychology at the University of Manchester, obtaining a first-class honours degree in 1971 and an MA in 1972, also in psychology. In 1972, he was admitted to Jesus College, Oxford, initially to study for a Bachelor of Letters postgraduate degree. He switched to the Bachelor of Philosophy (BPhil) postgraduate programme on the recommendation of his advisor, Michael R. Ayers. In 1973, McGinn received the university's John Locke Prize in Mental Philosophy; one of the examiners was A. J. Ayer. He received his BPhil in 1974, writing a thesis under the supervision of Ayers and P. F. Strawson on the semantics of Donald Davidson.

== Teaching career ==
=== Posts ===
McGinn taught at University College London for 11 years, first as a lecturer in philosophy (1974–84), then as reader (1984–85). In 1985, he succeeded Gareth Evans as Wilde Reader in Mental Philosophy at the University of Oxford, a position he held until 1990. He held visiting professorships at the University of California, Los Angeles (1979), Bielefeld University (1982), University of Southern California (1983), Rutgers University (1984), University of Helsinki (1986), City University of New York (1988) and Princeton University (1992). In 1990, he joined the philosophy department at Rutgers as a full professor, working alongside Jerry Fodor.

In 2006, he joined the University of Miami as Professor of Philosophy and Cooper Fellow.

=== Sexual harassment complaint ===
McGinn resigned his position at the University of Miami in January 2013, effective at the end of the calendar year, after a graduate student complained that he had been sexually harassing her, including by text and email. These documents have since been released and include explicit references to McGinn's desire to have sex with the student. He denied any wrongdoing.

Represented by Ann Olivarius, the student complained in April 2014 to the Equal Employment Opportunity Commission that the university had mishandled the case. She filed a lawsuit in October 2015 against the university, McGinn, and Edward Erwin, another philosophy professor at the University of Miami. The complaint accused McGinn of sexual harassment, civil assault, and defamation, and Erwin of defamation. It alleged that the university had violated Title IX of the Education Amendments of 1972 (which requires that women have equal access to education) by failing to investigate the student's complaint adequately or protect her from retaliation, including from McGinn on his blog before his resignation came into effect. McGinn's lawyer, Andrew Berman, said that McGinn denied the claim. The lawsuit was settled in October 2016. All parties are prohibited from disclosing the terms of the settlement.

The incident triggered a debate about the extent to which sexism remains prevalent in academia, particularly in academic philosophy, and the effect on students and teachers of harassment and harassment-related complaints.

In 2014, East Carolina University offered McGinn a visiting professorship but university administrators later rescinded the offer. McGinn blamed the sexual-harassment allegations for East Carolina's decision.

In 2024, McGinn wrote: "I have existed in a state of professional cancellation for over ten years now. Before that I had normal access to teaching positions, publishers, conferences, professional contacts, and so on. Not anymore."

In 2025, McGinn wrote that his resignation 12 years earlier was not an admission of guilt, but that he had had no desire to stay at the University of Miami. "I judged it wiser to resign and go elsewhere, which I fully expected to do. What I didn't expect was the complete stupidity and ill-will of my colleagues in the American philosophy profession", he wrote.

== Writing ==
=== Philosophy of mind ===
McGinn has written extensively on philosophical logic, metaphysics, and philosophy of language, but is best known for his work in philosophy of mind. He is known in particular for the development of the idea that human minds are incapable of solving the problem of consciousness, a position known as new mysterianism. In addition to his academic publications on consciousness, including The Character of Mind (1982), The Problem of Consciousness (1991) and Consciousness and Its Objects (2004), he has written a popular introduction, The Mysterious Flame: Conscious Minds in a Material World (1999).

Owen Flanagan introduced the term "new mysterians" in 1991 (named after the band Question Mark & the Mysterians) to describe McGinn's position and that of Thomas Nagel, first described in Nagel's "What Is It Like to Be a Bat?" (1974). McGinn introduced his position in "Can We Solve the Mind-Body Problem?" (Mind, 1989), and in The Problem of Consciousness (1991), arguing that the human mind is incapable of comprehending itself entirely. Mark Rowlands writes that the 1989 article was largely responsible for reviving the debate about phenomenal consciousness, or the nature of experience. McGinn argued in the paper for the idea of cognitive closure:

A type of mind M is cognitively closed with respect to a property P (or theory T), if and only if the concept-forming procedures at M's disposal cannot extend to a grasp of P (or an understanding of T). Conceiving minds come in different kinds, equipped with varying powers and limitations, biases and blindspots, so that properties (or theories) may be accessible to some minds but not to others. What is closed to the mind of a rat may be open to the mind of a monkey, and what is open to us may be closed to the monkey. ... But such closure does not reflect adversely on the reality of the properties that lie outside the representational capacities in question; a property is no less real for not being reachable from a certain kind of perceiving and conceiving mind.

Although human beings might grasp the concept of consciousness, McGinn argues that we cannot understand its causal basis: neither direct examination of consciousness nor of the brain can identify the properties that cause or provide the mechanism for consciousness, or how "technicolour phenomenology [can] arise from soggy grey matter." Thus, his answer to the hard problem of consciousness is that the answer is inaccessible to us.

New, or epistemological, mysterianism is contrasted with the old, or ontological, form, namely that consciousness is inherently mysterious or supernatural. The new mysterians are not Cartesian dualists. The argument holds that human minds cannot understand consciousness, not that there is anything supernatural about it. The mind-body problem is simply "the perimeter of our conceptual anatomy making itself felt." McGinn describes this as existential naturalism.

=== Animal rights ===
McGinn is a supporter of animal rights, calling our treatment of non-humans "deeply and systematically immoral". His position is that we make the mistake of seeing the non-human only in relation to the human, because of "species solipsism": the farmer sees animals as food, the pet owner as companions for humans, the activist as victims of humans, the evolutionary biologist as "gene survival machines". But "their esse is not human percipi" – "The rhino looks at us with the same skewed solipsism we bring to him", McGinn writes, "and surely we do not want to be as limited in our outlook as he is." He argues that "we need to improve our manners" toward animals by recognizing that they have their own lives, and that those lives ought to be respected.

=== Novels and articles ===
McGinn has regularly contributed reviews and short stories to the London Review of Books and The New York Review of Books, and has written occasionally for Nature, The New York Times, The Guardian, The Wall Street Journal, The Times and The Times Literary Supplement. He has also written two novels, The Space Trap (1992) and Bad Patches (2012).

== Radio and television ==
In 1984, McGinn discussed John Searle's Reith lectures on BBC Radio Three with Searle, Richard Gregory and Colin Blakemore. The next year, he and Sir Andrew Huxley debated animal rights with Bernard Williams as the moderator. He was interviewed for Jonathan Miller's 2003 documentary miniseries Atheism: A Rough History of Disbelief, later broadcast as The Atheism Tapes (2004), and published an article titled "Why I am an Atheist". He has also appeared in 11 episodes of Closer to Truth hosted by Robert Lawrence Kuhn, discussing consciousness, personal identity, free will, and materialism.

== Works ==
Books

- (2017). Philosophical Provocations: 55 Short Essays. MIT Press.
- (2015). Inborn Knowledge: The Mystery Within. MIT Press.
- (2015). Prehension: The Hand and the Emergence of Humanity. MIT Press.
- (2015). Philosophy of Language: The Classics Explained. MIT Press.
- (2012). Bad Patches (novel). CreateSpace Independent Publishing Platform.
- (2011). Truth by Analysis: Games, Names, and Philosophy. Oxford University Press.
- (2011). Basic Structures of Reality: Essays in Meta-Physics. Oxford University Press.
- (2011). The Meaning of Disgust. Oxford University Press.
- (2008). Sport: A Philosopher's Manual. Acumen.
- (2008). Mindfucking: A Critique of Mental Manipulation. Acumen.
- (2006). Shakespeare's Philosophy: Discovering the Meaning Behind the Plays. HarperCollins.
- (2005). The Power of Movies: How Screen and Mind Interact. Pantheon.
- (2004). Mindsight: Image, Dream, Meaning. Harvard University Press.
- (2004). Consciousness and Its Objects. Oxford University Press.
- (2002). The Making of a Philosopher: My Journey Through Twentieth-Century Philosophy. HarperCollins.
- (2001). Logical Properties: Identity, Existence, Predication, Necessity, Truth. Oxford University Press.
- (1999). The Mysterious Flame: Conscious Minds in a Material World. Basic Books.
- (1999). Knowledge and Reality: Selected Papers. Oxford University Press.
- (1997). Ethics, Evil, and Fiction. Oxford University Press.
- (1997). Minds and Bodies: Philosophers and Their Ideas. Oxford University Press.
- (1993). Problems in Philosophy: The Limits of Inquiry. Blackwell.
- (1992). The Space Trap (novel). Duckworth (second edition, Amazon Digital Services, 2013).
- (1992). Moral Literacy or How To Do The Right Thing. Duckworth (London), Hackett (Indianapolis).
- (1991). The Problem of Consciousness. Basil Blackwell.
- (1989). Mental Content. Basil Blackwell.
- (1984). Wittgenstein on Meaning. Basil Blackwell.
- (1983). The Subjective View: Secondary Qualities and Indexical Thoughts. Oxford University Press.
- (1982). The Character of Mind. Oxford University Press (second edition, 1996, with subtitle An Introduction to the Philosophy of Mind).

Selected articles

- (2024). McGinn, Colin, "On Cancelling"
- (2013). "Homunculism", The New York Review of Books, 21 March (review of How to Create a Mind by Ray Kurzweil).
- (2012). "All machine and no ghost?", New Statesman, 20 February.
- (2010). McGinn, Colin, "Why I am an Atheist"
- (2004). Principia Metaphysica at the Wayback Machine (archived 11 December 2006).
- (2004). "Inverted First-Person Authority". The Monist.
- (2003). "The bookworm turned", The Guardian, 29 November.
- (2001). "How Not To Solve the Mind-Body Problem". In Carl Gillett and Barry Loewer (eds.). Physicalism and Its Discontents. Cambridge University Press.
- (2001). "What is it Not Like to be a Brain?" In Philip Van Loocke (ed.). The Physical Nature of Consciousness. John Benjamins Pub Co.
- (1999). "Our Duties to Animals and the Poor". In Dale Jamieson (ed.). Singer and His Critics. Basil Blackwell.
- (1996). "Another Look at Colour". Journal of Philosophy.
- (1995). "Consciousness and Space". Journal of Consciousness Studies.
- (1994). "The Problem of Philosophy". Philosophical Studies.
- (1992). "Must I Be Morally Perfect?". Analysis.
- (1991). "Conceptual Causation: Some Elementary Reflections". Mind.
- (1989). "Can We Solve the Mind-Body Problem?" Mind.
- (1984). "What is the Problem of Other Minds?". Proceedings of the Aristotelian Society.
- (1983). "Two Notions of Realism?". Philosophical Topics.
- (1982). "Realist Semantics and Content Ascription". Synthese.
- (1982). "Rigid Designation and Semantic Value". Philosophical Quarterly.
- (1980). "Philosophical Materialism". Synthese
- (1979). "An A Priori Argument for Realism". The Journal of Philosophy.
- (1979). "Single-case Probability and Logical Form". Mind.
- (1977). "Charity, Interpretation and Belief". The Journal of Philosophy.
- (1977). "Semantics for Nonindicative Sentences". Philosophical Studies.
- (1976). "A Priori and A Posteriori Knowledge". Proceedings of the Aristotelian Society.
- (1976). "A Note on the Frege Argument". Mind.
- (1976). "On the Necessity of Origin". The Journal of Philosophy.
- (1975). "A Note on the Essence of Natural Kinds". Analysis.
- (1972). "Mach and Husserl". Journal for the British Society of Phenomenology.

== See also ==
- List of animal rights advocates
