= Sonuga =

Sonuga is a surname. Notable people with the surname include:

- Edmund Sonuga-Barke (born 1962), English psychologist
- Pepi Sonuga (born 1993), Nigerian American actress
- Titilope Sonuga (born 1985), Nigerian poet
