= Cognitive closure =

Cognitive closure may refer to:

- Cognitive closure (psychology), the human desire to eliminate ambiguity and arrive at definite conclusions (sometimes irrationally)
- Cognitive closure (philosophy), the idea that only certain things are understandable by beings like us
