= Association for Child and Adolescent Mental Health =

Charity in the United Kingdom

The Association for Child and Adolescent Mental Health (ACAMH) is a UK based charitable body with stated objects of "the advancement of all matters concerning the mental health and development of children, young people and their families by promoting and disseminating scientific research and scholarship, and their implications for the evidence-base of multi-disciplinary clinical practice." ACAMH's membership comprises a diverse group of clinicians, practitioners, and researchers working across various domains of child and adolescent mental health. It maintains a network of branches across the UK.

ACAMH activities include Organizing conferences, training events, and masterclasses on topical issues; providing online Continuing Professional Development resources; running special interest groups to further various disciplines; and to share information and best practices. It publishes several peer-reviewed journals:

- Journal of Child Psychology and Psychiatry (JCPP)
- Child and Adolescent Mental Health (CAMH)
- JCPP Advances

== History ==
The association was conceived in 1954 at the International Congress of Child Psychiatry and Allied Disciplines, inspired by Emanuel Miller's desire to create a multidisciplinary network in Britain. It was officially established in 1956 as the Association for Child Psychology and Psychiatry. The Journal of Child Psychology and Psychiatry was first published in 1960.

The Emanuel Miller Memorial Lectures, commemorating the British child psychiatrist Emanuel Miller (1892–1970), were started by the Association in 1972.

Austrian British child psychologist Mia Kellmer Pringle served as chair and was named an honorary life member of the organization. Sir Roy Meadow, former Professor of Pediatrics and Child Health, University of Leeds was Chairman from 1983-84.

In 2005, the organization changed its name to the Association for Child and Adolescent Mental Health to better reflect its interdisciplinary nature.

In 2026, ACAMH still supports professionals who work with children's mental health. They organize conferences, training events, and masterclasses on topic in child and adolescent mental health. It also provides (CPD) resources which is Continuing Professional Development.

Notable members have included Jack Tizard who was an adviser on learning disability to the Association.

== ACAMH Learn ==
In September 2024, ACAMH launched "ACAMH Learn", a free online learning platform offering video and podcast content from over 200 mental health experts. This platform aims to support the CPD of mental health practitioners, clinicians, academics, researchers, teachers, and social workers.
