= Sinéad McGilloway =

Irish public health and community psychologist

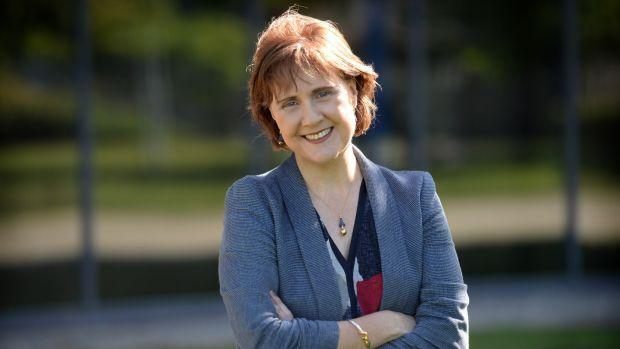
- Born: Derry, Northern Ireland
- Education: Queen’s University Belfast (PhD, 1997)
- Known for: Parenting, family mental health and school interventions
- Awards: Lionel Hersov Memorial Award (2022, Association for Child and Adolescent Mental Health, UK); Irish Research Council Research Ally Prize (2022)
- Scientific career
- Fields: Public health psychology, community psychology, health services research
- Workplaces: Maynooth University, Queen’s University Belfast

Sinéad McGilloway is an Irish public health and community psychologist, and Professor of Family and Community Mental Health at Maynooth University. She is the founder and director of the Centre for Mental Health and Community Research (CMHCR), which is based in Maynooth University's Department of Psychology and affiliated with the Maynooth University Social Sciences Institute. Her research focuses on early intervention and prevention in mental health, including parenting, family mental health and child/adolescent wellbeing in school and community settings.

== Early life and education ==
McGilloway was born in Derry, Northern Ireland. She obtained a PhD in Mental Health from Queen’s University Belfast (Faculty of Medicine) in 1997, for research on negative symptoms and speech parameters in schizophrenia. She is a Chartered Psychologist (CPsychol) and Chartered Scientist (CSci) with the British Psychological Society, and an Associate Fellow of the society.

== Career ==
In her early career, McGilloway worked as a Research Psychologist at Queen’s University Institute of Clinical Science, contributing to, amongst other projects, a multi-year evaluation of desinstitutionalisation, or care in the community, for people discharged from mental health and learning disability hospitals.

She joined Maynooth University in 2000 as a lecturer and co-founding member of staff of the Department of Psychology, and was promoted to Senior Lecturer in 2004 and to Professor in 2016. In 2008, she established what later became known as the Centre for Mental Health and Community Research, which is a member of the global Mental Health Innovation Network.

== Research ==
McGilloway has led research on early intervention and prevention in mental health, particularly the development and evaluation of interventions and services for children, young people and families. She was Principal Investigator of the national evaluation of the Incredible Years Parent, Teacher and Child programmes in Ireland, funded by the Atlantic Philanthropies. The programme has been adopted internationally, including in Australia by the Victorian Government. Findings from this evaluation have been cited by the California Evidence-Based Clearinghouse for Child Welfare, the European Union Drugs Agency, the Health Service Executive, and the National Educational Psychological Service.

McGilloway's work on parental and family mental health, including perinatal wellbeing, has been reported in national media. Her studies on wellbeing in schools have also been covered by media including the BBC and the Irish Examiner.

In 2019, she was appointed to the British Psychological Society Expert Reference Group on Children and Young People’s Mental Health, which advised the UK government on mental health in schools.

She has also contributed to European pooled analyses of parenting interventions, including a pan-European study published in The Lancet Psychiatry. She led the first national review of home visiting services for families with young children in Ireland, commissioned by the Department of Children, Disability and Equality. In 2024, she was a member of the expert group that produced Ireland’s first National Mental Health Research Strategy.

== Honours and awards ==
- Lionel Hersov Memorial Award (team), UK Association for Child and Adolescent Mental Health (2022)
- Research Ally Prize, Irish Research Council (2022)
- Maynooth University Faculty of Social Sciences Research Achievement Award (2021)
- International Award for Excellence, International Journal of Aging and Society (2013)
- International Critical Incident Stress Foundation Co-founders’ Award (team) (2011)

== Selected publications ==
- Phillips, B.; O’Toole, C.; McGilloway, S.; Phillips, S. (2025). Trauma-informed practice in Montessori classrooms: An essential guide for students and teachers. London: Routledge. ISBN 9781032571454.
- Furlong, M.; McGuinness, C.; Mulligan, C.; McGarr, S.; McGilloway, S. (2024). "Family Talk versus usual services in improving child and family psychosocial functioning in families with parental mental illness: a randomised controlled trial and cost analysis". Frontiers in Psychiatry. 15: 1287378. doi:10.3389/fpsyt.2024.1287378.
- Hickey, G.; McGilloway, S. (2023). "The implementation and effectiveness of group-based programmes for mainly vulnerable parent populations". In: Devaney, C.; Crosse, R. (eds). International Perspectives on Parenting Support and Parental Participation in Children and Family Services. London: Routledge. ISBN 9781003334248. doi:10.4324/9781003334248-12.
- Hickey, G.; McGilloway, S.; Leckey, Y.; Stokes, A.; Bywater, T.; Donnelly, M. (2020). "Putting meat on the bones: Understanding the implementation of a community-based early intervention and prevention programme". Prevention Science. 22(1): 113–129. doi:10.1007/s11121-020-01170-y.
- Leckey, Y.; Hickey, G.; Hyland, L.; Kelly, P.; Bywater, T.; Comiskey, C.; Lodge, A.; Donnelly, M.; McGilloway, S. (2016). "A mixed methods evaluation of a classroom-based teacher-training intervention". Irish Educational Studies. 35(1): 35–55. doi:10.1080/03323315.2016.1147974.
- McGilloway, S.; Ni Mhaille, G.; Bywater, T.; Leckey, Y.; Kelly, P.; Furlong, M.; Comiskey, C.; O’Neill, D.; Donnelly, M. (2014). "Reducing child conduct disordered behaviour and improving parent mental health". European Child and Adolescent Psychiatry. 23(9): 783–794. doi:10.1007/s00787-013-0499-2.
- Furlong, M.; McGilloway, S.; Bywater, T.; Hutchings, J.; Donnelly, M.; Smith, S.M. (2012). "Behavioural/cognitive-behavioural group-based parenting interventions for children age 3–12 with early onset conduct problems". Cochrane Database of Systematic Reviews. 2012(2): CD008225. doi:10.1002/14651858.CD008225.pub2.
