= The Body in Question =

- Genre: Medical
- Created by: Jonathan Miller
- Written by: Jonathan Miller
- Presented by: Jonathan Miller
- Starring: Jonathan Miller
- Composer: Peter Howell "The Greenwich Chorus" (BBC Radiophonic Workshop)
- Country of origin: United Kingdom
- Original language: English
- No. of seasons: 1
- No. of episodes: 13

Production
- Executive producer: Karl Sabbagh
- Producer: Patrick Uden
- Running time: 60 minutes
- Production companies: ABC (Aus.), BBC, CBC, OECA, KCET-TV

Original release
- Network: BBC, Australian Broadcasting Corporation, CBC Television, KCET-TV (PBS), OECA
- Release: 6 November 1978 – 26 May 1979

The Body in Question is a British-based, internationally co-produced medical television series first aired on the BBC in November 1978.

== Premise ==
This is a thirty-part series (one hour episodes) on all aspects of medicine and health science, written and presented by Dr. Jonathan Miller.

Miller considers the functioning of the body as a subject of private experience. He explores our attitudes towards our bodies, our ignorance of them, and our inability to read our body's signals. The first episode starts with vox populi asking where various organs in the body are located. By the final episode we are left in no doubt, as the show became the first in television history to depict the dissection of a human cadaver (i.e. post-mortem examination or autopsy).

Taking as his starting point the experience of pain, Dr. Miller analyses the elaborate social process of "falling ill", considers the physical foundations of "disease" and looks at the types of individuals humankind has historically attributed with the power of healing. The series was nominated for two 1979 BAFTAs: Best Factual Television Series and Most Original Programme/Series.

== Production ==
The series was primarily produced by the BBC, with international co-production support from the Australian Broadcasting Corporation, CBC Television, Ontario Educational Communications Authority, and KCET-TV.

== Scheduling ==
This hour-long series was first aired by the BBC on 6 November 1978. It was first broadcast in Canada on CBC Television Mondays at 11:45 p.m. (Eastern time) from 26 February to 28 May 1979. It was rebroadcast on CBC in mid-1981 (3 June to 2 September).

== Episodes ==
1. Naming of Parts
2. Try a Little Tenderness
3. How Do You Feel?
4. Breathless
5. Blood Relations
6. Heart of the Matter
7. Shaping the Future
8. Sleight of Hand
9. Native Medicine
10. Balancing Act
11. Brute Machine
12. Heads and Tails
13. Perishable Goods

== Production team ==
This list is extracted from the ending credits of all the shows:

- Lighting Cameraman: Ken Lowe
- Rostrum Camera: Ivor Richardson
- Camera Operator: Tony Mayne
- Sound Recordists: Martyn Clift, Barrie Tharby
- Dubbing Mixer: Stan Morcom
- Film Editor: Simon Hammond, Pauline Dykes
- Music: Peter Howell (BBC Radiophonic Workshop)
- Research: Jon Palfreman, Jane Callandar
- Graphic Design: Charles McGhie, Barbra Flinder
- Design: Colin Lowrey
- Production Assistant: Fisher Dilke, John Palfreman
- Production Team: Mary Phelps, Pamela Smith, Avril Stewart
- Assistant Producer: Jonathan Crane
- Executive Producer: Karl Sabbagh
- Producer: Patrick Uden

== Music release ==
A three track single of Peter Howell's music from this single was released on 7" vinyl in 1981. These tracks were issued as bonus tracks in the Record Store Day exclusive 6-CD box set Four Albums 1968 - 1978 29 August 2020.
