= Bridge on the River Wye =

Studio album Comedy by The Goons
- Released: 1962
- Genre: Humour
- Label: Parlophone
- Producer: George Martin

Bridge on the River Wye is an album by members of the British comedy group The Goon Show and other humorists. It was produced by George Martin for EMI's Parlophone Records. It is a parody of the 1957 film The Bridge on the River Kwai. For legal reasons, the 'K' at the start of Kwai was edited out. Wye is the name of a river in the UK.

The record stars Spike Milligan, Peter Sellers, Jonathan Miller and Peter Cook, and also features Peter Rawley (a pseudonym for Dudley Moore) and Patricia Ridgway, with incidental music composed and directed by Angela Morley.

The script was written by Spike Milligan, based on an earlier script by Milligan and Larry Stephens for The Goon Show, "African Incident" (Series 8, Episode 14), first broadcast on BBC radio on 30 December 1957.

The record jacket advises, "For best results, play this record in a circular fashion". Artwork was designed by Dennis Gosling (1934–2014).
