= The Atheism Tapes =

2004 film series by Richard Denton

- Genre: Documentary series
- Presented by: Jonathan Miller
- No. of episodes: 6

Original release
- Network: BBC Four
- Release: 18 October – 22 November 2004

Related
- A Rough History of Disbelief

The Atheism Tapes is a 2004 BBC television documentary series presented by Jonathan Miller. The material that makes up the series was originally filmed in 2003 for another, more general series, Atheism: A Rough History of Disbelief, but was too lengthy for inclusion. Instead, the BBC agreed to create The Atheism Tapes as a supplementary series of six programmes, each consisting of an extended interview with one contributor.

== Programmes ==
All six programmes were conducted in the form of interviews; the synopses below are summaries of the interviewees' responses to Miller's questions.

=== Colin McGinn ===
English philosopher McGinn speaks about the various reasons for not believing in God, and some of the reasons for. He gives a thorough treatment of the ontological argument. In addition, McGinn draws an important distinction between atheism (lack of belief in a deity) and antitheism (active opposition to theism); he identifies himself as both an atheist and an antitheist. Finally, he speculates about a post-theistic society.

=== Steven Weinberg ===
American physicist Weinberg talks about the effectiveness of the Design Argument, both in the past and today. He also discusses the reasons that people become religious, including the varying influences of physical and biological arguments against religion. Miller connects this to a higher likelihood of biologists being non-believers than physicists, which Weinberg finds surprising.

Weinberg goes on to distinguish between harm done in the name of religion from that done by religion and states that both of these are very real and very dangerous. He goes on to discuss the difference between religious belief in America and Europe, and about how he doesn't like the "character" of the monotheistic God. He ends by saying that science is very definitely corrosive to religious belief, and that he considers this a good thing.

=== Arthur Miller ===
American playwright Arthur Miller talks about his atheism from a Jewish perspective. He discusses his view that some cases of antisemitism come from Christians who believe Jewish people are disbelievers because they do not believe Christ was the son of God. They also discuss the overlay of religion and patriotism, particularly with American politics, but also on how many of the wars today come from the mixture of nationalism and religious beliefs. Lastly, he explains how he does not believe that there is an afterlife except in the sense that people are remembered by the material possessions that they leave behind or the deeds that they did during their life that still affect the world.

=== Richard Dawkins ===
English biologist Richard Dawkins first talks about how the view that evil exists may come from a personification of some principal belief. Next, he explains the process by which he became an atheist despite being raised as an Anglican. They then discuss at length natural selection and how it acts as the guiding force for evolution. He also points out the fallacy in using a God-of-the-gaps argument for explaining the world. Next, he goes over the importance of holding and defending an atheist world view.

=== Denys Turner ===
British theologian Denys Turner points out that being an atheist or theist depends largely upon what questions you ask yourself. He then shares his view that atheism can also suffer from its own sort of fundamentalism. They spend some time covering the issue of why or how something comes from nothing.

=== Daniel Dennett ===
American philosopher Dennett explains why he called one of his books Darwin's Dangerous Idea, and why many of Darwin's contemporaries, in particular, considered Darwin's theory of evolution to be dangerous. He goes on to deal with the question of consciousness (i.e., is the consciousness/soul distinct from the body), talking about Darwin's rejection of the soul and the possible origins and psychological purposes of a belief in an immaterial soul.

Next, he talks about his Christian upbringing and how he became an atheist. He goes on to ask why it is thought rude to criticise religious belief, and suggests that it is due to the influential status of the religions in question. He finishes by wondering whether we could live effectively in a post-theistic world.
