= Cognitive closure (philosophy) =

Inherent limitations of the human mind

In philosophy of mind and philosophy of science, cognitive closure is the view that human cognitive faculties are fundamentally incapable of solving certain philosophical problems. These problems, which have persisted throughout the history of philosophy, are considered beyond the reach of human understanding, not because of insufficient data or research, but due to inherent limits in the structure or capabilities of the mind.

Philosopher Colin McGinn, a proponent of cognitive closure, argues that certain philosophical problems, such as the mind–body problem, personal identity, the foundations of meaning, knowledge, both a priori and empirical, and free will, may be fundamentally unknowable by humans. He refers to this viewpoint as transcendental naturalism. Philosopher Owen Flanagan has referred to this stance as "anti-constructive naturalism" or "new mysterianism", and like McGinn, he posits that the limitations are intrinsic to the human brain’s design.

== History ==
Immanuel Kant argued in the Critique of Pure Reason that human thinking is unavoidably structured by categories of the understanding:

Quantity – Unity, Plurality, Totality.

Quality – Reality, Negation, Limitation.

Relation – Inherence and Subsistence, Causality and Dependence, Community.

Modality – Possibility or Impossibility, Existence or Non-Existence, Necessity or Contingence.

Kant argued that these are ideas that impose a limit to thinking. What can be known through the categories is called "things for us" and what is outside the categories is unthinkable, called "things in themselves".

John Tyndall, in the 19th century, observed that even if we were able to map the precise molecular activities in the brain, the connection between physical brain states and conscious experiences might remain intellectually impassable. This suggests that, despite advanced scientific understanding, some problems -- especially those relating to consciousness -- would evade explanation.

In the early 20th century, Friedrich Hayek argued that "the whole idea of the mind explaining itself is a logical contradiction", likening it to a generalized case of Gödel's incompleteness theorem. Hayek was not a naturalistic agnostic, that is, the view that science currently cannot offer an explanation of the mind–body relationship, but in principle it could."

== Consciousness ==
The problem of consciousness is often cited as one of the central issues of cognitive closure. Philosopher Thomas Nagel, in his essay "What Is It Like to Be a Bat?" explored the idea that the subjective nature of experience might be inherently beyond the reach of scientific explanation. Nagel’s argument underscores the difficulty in explaining how physical processes in the brain give rise to conscious experience.

Noam Chomsky suggests that a species with a different cognitive structure might find some problems trivial to solve, highlighting that certain philosophical issues may be beyond human comprehension because of the biological constraints of our minds.

Owen Flanagan noted in his 1991 book Science of the Mind that some modern thinkers have suggested that consciousness will never be completely explained. Flanagan called them "the new mysterians" after the rock group Question Mark and the Mysterians.

According to Colin McGinn, the solution to the mind–body problem cannot be grasped, despite the fact that the solution is "written in our genes".

Emergent materialism is a similar but different claim that humans are not yet smart enough to determine the relationship between mind and matter.

== See also ==
- Epistemological nihilism
- Dialetheism
- Inquiry
- Mystical experience
- Münchhausen trilemma
- Pyrrhonism
- Reductionism
- Strong agnosticism is a religious application of a similar position.
- Uncertainty
- Vertiginous question
