= English and Romanian Adoptees study =

The English and Romanian Adoptees (ERA) Study was formulated by Professor Sir Michael Rutter of King's College London, with the help of the English and Romanian Adoptees (ERA) Study Team. This longitudinal study, also referred to as a "natural experiment", was conducted in the U.K. between the 1990s and the early 2000s, that compared the effects of early privation on development overtime by comparing Romanian and English children.

It is important to recognize that when the Romanian adoptee children first came to the United Kingdom, most of the children were facing poor health conditions, ranging from respiratory and intestinal infections, malnutrition, and various kinds of skin disorders.

The first mention of this study within a mainstream news source was in the New York Times in 1998, within an article that discusses attachment theory by Margaret Talbot. Talbot's article discusses the phenomenon of American families adopting children from places within Europe where the children are experiences poor living and rearing experiences within institutional settings and it shares a quote from Michael Rutter, where he states his viewpoint on how the infants coming from Romania and the Soviet Union are "by far the biggest group of deprived babies" available to study for these early privation experiences and developmental outcomes.

== Study Overview ==
=== Developmental Catch-Up, and Deficit, Following Adoption After Severe Global Early Privation ===
The first part of the study was published in 1998 by Michael Rutter and the English and Romanian Adoptees (ERA) Study team, where they examined the physical and cognitive differences in development between Romanian and English adoptees. The sample consisted of 163 children at age 4, with 111 of those children being from Romania that were placed in the U.K. before age 2 and the remaining 52 children were originally from the U.K. that were placed into homes before they hit 6 months old. The reason these within-country early adoptees were a part of the study was to examine the differences of adoption and child-rearing experiences, in comparison to the experiences and early privation the Romanian adoptees had experienced.

The procedure of data collection from researchers consists of home visits where the primary caregiver (usually the mother) was interviewed, questionnaires that focused on behavior and familial relationships, and lastly, a visit to the child that assessed cognitive functioning and developmental abilities.

To examine differences between Romanian and English adoptees, they focused of the children's records of height, weight and head circumference, either from when they first entered the U.K., or if not possible, they used the records from Romania to have clearer growth patterns overtime. At time of entry into the United Kingdom, it was found that the Romanian adoptees were severely developmentally impaired in all areas of measurement (height, weight, head circumference) compared to the English adoptees due to early negative rearing experiences.

Even though the early institutional rearing experiences is the explanation for the severe developmental deficit children were experiencing within the study, the researchers also point out that they do not have the full access to records of the Romanian children to evaluate for genetic influences, reasons children were admitted to institutional care, and no clear developmental level of the children from when they first came to the United Kingdom; the developmental level was reported from the adoptive parents by recalling their memory of events.

By age 4, the Romanian adoptee children, to the researchers' surprise, caught up developmentally to the other adoptee children. This finding highlights how the early institutional rearing experiences children have can impact their early development. These findings led to researchers questioning how the degree of early privation impacts developmental catch-up within adoptee children.

=== The Effects of Global Severe Privation on Cognitive Competence: Extension and Longitudinal Follow-Up ===
The second phase of the study was published in 2000 by Michael Rutter, colleagues, and the English and Romanian Adoptees Study (ERA) team, but within this round of the study the sample size was 217 children in total at age 6, which the previous 163 children studied are still included in this phase; they examined 165 Romanian and 52 English adoptee children in total. The sample size within this part of the study is greater due to the researchers wanting to include another group of 54 Romanian Adoptees that were placed into adoptive institutions in the U.K. between 24 and 42 months of age to further examine the effects of privation on developmental catch-up within cognition and physical development.

Procedures to collecting results was similar to collection at age 4, where researchers had completed in home visits with the families to conduct interviews and questionnaires, as well as a final visit to assess the child's developmental abilities and cognitive function.

The findings within this phase of the study reinforce the previous findings, proving that the adoptee children from Romania at age 6 can catch up and were similar developmentally and cognitively to their comparative peers, the English adoptees. The Romanian children that caught up at age 4 continued to stay developmentally similar to the English children at age 6, while those who had deficits at age 4 continued to struggle. Even though these findings did support the previous phase's findings, it was identified through this phase that it was possible these children could be facing "long-term difficulties".

One big insight that was discovered from this study was that children being moved into their adoptive homes was the main factor that impacted their cognitive functioning and that the duration of time the children experienced early privation indicates individual differences in development. Another insight that was discovered is when a child experienced early privation, once they were placed within their adoptive homes, the longer the child was there, the more the child gained in cognitive functioning.

The end of this phase emphasizes that the data they are finding is based on postadoption findings and environment, the researchers do not have clear insights on other potential influences, such as genetics and/or antenatal care.

=== Do the Effects of Early Severe Deprivation on Cognition Persist Into Early Adolescence? Findings From the English and Romanian Adoptees Study ===
This part of the study, completed by Michael Rutter, colleagues and the English and Romanian Adoptees (ERA) Study Team focuses on a sample size of 128 Romanian adoptees and 50 English adoptees at age 11; this is the first part of the study where Edmund Sonuga-Barke is mentioned by name.

One finding within this study that stuck out was that the Romanian adoptees' level of intellectual impairment at age 6 was more of an indicator on catch-up than the age they originally came to the United Kingdom. It was noticed that adoptees with the lowest cognitive scores had the best catch-up within earlier years (age 4 and age 6) and children that were still impaired at age 6 had the best cognitive catch-up between 6 and 11 years of age; even though the children that were impaired at age 6 had the best catch-up between 6 and 11, the children's schooling experiences did not impact their cognitive function.

While the findings still show the Romanian adoptee children being able to developmentally catch up to their comparative peers, it was found that IQ levels for the children were steady between age 6 and 11, showing how early severe deprivation experiences children experiences can have lasting impacts until 11 years old. The duration of institutional deprivation the Romanian adoptees experienced (6–42 months) does not explain differences in IQ at age 11 because there was "marked heterogeneity", a vast degree of variation within IQ scores. Researchers believe the variations can be linked to genetic influences, individual institution experiences and/or environmental influences.

Another finding was that researchers, with this phase of study, believe the duration a child is within an adoptive home has the most impact on cognitive function, especially within the most severely deprived adoptees.

This phase made it clear to researchers that the measurement of weight, the adoptees' subnutrition at the time of entry to the United Kingdom, did not have any impact on outcomes at age 11, even though malnutrition is one major aspect of severe institutional deprivation experiences.

Lastly, it was discovered that the adoptive family's individual background (e.g., adoptive parents' level of educational obtainment) did not have a clear connection to the adoptee's cognitive outcome at age 11 or changes in cognitive functioning between age 6 and 11. Adoptive parents influence on children's cognition can be linked to child-rearing practices, communication and play between child and parent, and overarching institutional deprivation experiences.

=== Conclusions: Overview of Findings from the ERA Study, Inferences, and Research Implications ===
Overall, it was confirmed that early severe institutional deprivation has long-term effects and can cause deprivation-specific psychological patterns (DSPs). The DSPs researchers identified were quasi-autistic (Q-A) patterns, disinhibited attachment (DA), cognitive impairment (CI) and inattention/overactivity (I/O) because they showed strong and consistent association with institutional deprivation.

== Forms of Data Collection ==
=== Level of Development ===
At age 4 and 6, children's level of development was determined through a questionnaire given to parents using the Denver Developmental Assessment. This covered various developmental domains, such as gross and fine motor skills, language and socioemotional development.

=== Cognitive Function ===
At age 6, children's cognitive functioning was evaluated using the McCarthy Scales of Children's Abilities.

At age 11, The Wechsler Intelligence Scale for Children was used.

== Media ==
In 2022, with the help of ShortCutsTV, Edmund Sonuga-Barke led the production of a film as creative role about the ERA study. While the film is under 12 minutes long, it discusses the history, overview and findings of the English and Romanian Adoptees (ERA) study. The study itself does not give any historical context of the tens of thousands of children ended up in orphanages in Romania, but the film gives a brief overview that the children who ended up in these orphanages was an outcome of the fall of the Communist Government in 1989. They also highlight that this study was the first of its kind to follow children who had early deprivation experiences from childhood into their adulthood; it is highly influential on other studies within the field of child psychiatry and developmental psychology.
