= Betty Miller (author) =

Irish writer (1910–1965)

- Born: Betty Spiro; 1910; Cork, Ireland
- Died: 24 November 1965 (aged 54–55); London, U.K.
- Other name: B. Bergson Spiro (pen name)
- Occupations: Writer, journalist, novelist
- Spouse: Emanuel Miller
- Children: 2, including Jonathan Miller

Betty Bergson Spiro Miller (1910 – 24 November 1965) was an Irish author of literary fiction and non-fiction.

== Early life and education ==
Betty Spiro was born in Cork, Ireland, the daughter of Sara Bergson and Simon Spiro, who were Lithuanian Jews. She earned a degree in journalism at University College, London, in 1930.

== Career ==
She wrote her first novel, The Mere Living (1933), while she was a university student; it was first published under the pen name "B. Bergson Spiro". Several more novels followed. After the Second World Warshe wrote extensively for literary journals including Horizon, The Cornhill Magazine and The Twentieth Century. She also edited a collection of letters from Elizabeth Barrett Browning to fellow writer Mary Russell Mitford, published in 1954.

Miller's literary reputation was established by the publication of her biography of Robert Browning (1952), which earned her election to the Royal Society of Literature. In The New York Times, novelist Francis Steegmuller called Miller's biography of Browning "fascinating and impressive", and wrote that it "supersedes previous lives of the poet". In The Daily Telegraph Guy Ramsey wrote that "It is difficult to know which to admire the most — the industry of research, the delicacy of insight, or the moderation of statement."

== Personal life and legacy ==
In 1933 Betty Spiro married Emanuel Miller, a founding father of British child psychiatry. The couple had two children: Sarah (died 2006), and Sir Jonathan Miller (1934–2019), the theatre and opera director. Betty Miller died in 1965, at the age of 55, in London.

Of Miller's seven novels two have been reprinted: Farewell, Leicester Square (1941), by Persephone Books in 2000, and On the Side of the Angels (1945), by Capuchin Classics in 2012.

== Books by Miller ==
- The Mere Living (1933)
- Sunday (1934)
- Portrait of the Bride (1935)
- Farewell Leicester Square (1941)
- A Room in Regent's Park (1942)
- On the Side of the Angels (1945)
- The Death of a Nightingale (1948)
- Robert Browning: A Portrait (1952)
- Elizabeth Barrett to Miss Mitford (1954, editor)
