= Born Talking: A Personal Inquiry into Language =

T.V. documentary series

Born Talking: A Personal Inquiry into Language is a 1990 BBC television documentary series, written and presented by Jonathan Miller, that attempts to shed light on the complexities of language.

== Episodes ==
The series consists of four episodes, which run 47 minutes each:

- Doing What Comes Naturally: Childhood Language Acquisition
- Broken English: The Effects of Brain Damage on Language
- Lending a Hand: Sign Languages and the Deaf
- In a Manner of Speaking: The Phenomenon of Conversation
