= Journal of Child Psychology and Psychiatry =

- Language: English
- Edited by: Edmund Sonuga-Barke

Publication details
- Former name(s): Journal of Child Psychology and Psychiatry, and Allied Disciplines
- History: 1960–present
- Publisher: Wiley-Blackwell
- Frequency: Monthly
- Impact factor: 6.129 (2018)

Standard abbreviations
- ISO 4: J. Child Psychol. Psychiatry

Indexing
- CODEN: JPPDAI
- ISSN: 0021-9630 (print); 1469-7610 (web)
- OCLC no.: 01307942

Links
- Journal homepage; Online access; Online archive

The Journal of Child Psychology and Psychiatry is a peer-reviewed scientific journal covering both child and adolescent psychology and psychiatry providing an interdisciplinary perspective to the multidisciplinary field of child and adolescent mental health, though publication of high-quality empirical research, clinically-relevant studies and highly cited research reviews and practitioner review articles.

It is one of two journals of the Association for Child and Adolescent Mental Health, the other being Child and Adolescent Mental Health.

== Publication history ==
The Journal of Child Psychology and Psychiatry was first published in 1960 by the then Association for Child Psychology and Psychiatry (now the Association for Child and Adolescent Mental Health) following a name change on 18 March 2005). It dropped the "Allied Disciplines" component from its title in 2004.

The primary founding aim of the journal was to "bring together original papers concerned with the child, from such diverse disciplines as psychiatry, psychology, paediatrics, psychoanalysis, social case-work and sociology". The original intent was also to extend the focus from the individual, then a characteristic feature of psychology and psychiatry practice, to the broader family and social context, recognising that development occurs in interactive social settings and that contributions from the other disciplines, including "cultural anthropology and animal behaviour", would benefit our understanding. Further, it was recognised that the methodologies employed by the different disciplines represented by the Journal varied, ranging from those in which "a considerable degree of systematic exactitude is possible" to others in which "reliance has often to be placed on the more subjective evidence of the clinician or skilled observer". Such diversity was considered and relevant, valuable and should be reflected in the Journal. Finally, as no general theory existed that would account for what was then known about psycho-pathology in children and young people, and as there was no agreement as to what such a theory might look like, the founding Editors asserted that the JCPP "will provide a forum in which serious contributions, inspired by any point of view, will be welcomed".

The first editors were Elizabeth Irvine, a social worker, Colin Hindley, a medical practitioner turned developmental psychologist, and Emanuel Miller, a child psychiatrist whose ideas profoundly shaped the aims for the new Journal. The founding editors also constituted a group representing the main disciplines in what was then called "child guidance", now known as child and adolescent mental health services (CAMHS) or child and family services, in the United Kingdom National Health Service (NHS).Contributions to the four issues of the first volume well reflect the aspirations of the founders, with different disciplines represented. A number of the papers are data-based, some "philosophical" and others descriptive, the range covering clinical, developmental, educational and other topics.

Over the early decades, developmental psychopathology, child development and the allied disciplines became increasingly differentiated, encompassing a widening diversity of topics that reflected the growing breadth and increasing depth of interest in these areas.

Since the 1990s, there has been further diversification of journal content, reflecting the emergence of many new developments that have an increasingly important impact on clinical research and practice.

== Abstracting and indexing information ==
The journal is abstracted and indexed in the following:

- Abstracts in Anthropology (Sage)
- Academic Search (EBSCO Publishing)
- Academic Search Alumni Edition (EBSCO Publishing)
- Academic Search Elite (EBSCO Publishing)
- Academic Search Premier (EBSCO Publishing)
- AgeLine Database (EBSCO Publishing)
- AMED: Allied & Complementary Medicine Database (British Library)
- Biological Abstracts (Clarivate Analytics)
- BIOSIS Previews (Clarivate Analytics)
- Current Contents: Clinical Medicine (Clarivate Analytics)
- Current Contents: Social & Behavioral Sciences (Clarivate Analytics)
- Education Index/Abstracts (EBSCO Publishing)
- ERIC: Educational Resources Information Center (CSC)
- Expanded Academic ASAP (GALE Cengage)
- InfoTrac (GALE Cengage)
- Journal Citation Reports/Science Edition (Clarivate Analytics)
- Journal Citation Reports/Social Science Edition (Clarivate Analytics)
- MEDLINE/PubMed (NLM)
- OmniFile Full Text Mega Edition (HW Wilson)
- Periodical Index Online (ProQuest)
- Psychology & Behavioral Sciences Collection (EBSCO Publishing)
- Psychology Collection (GALE Cengage)
- PsycINFO/Psychological Abstracts (APA)
- PsycSCAN: Developmental Psychology (APA)
- PSYNDEX (ZPID)
- PubMed Dietary Supplement Subset (NLM)
- Research Library (ProQuest)
- Science Citation Index (Clarivate Analytics)
- Science Citation Index Expanded (Clarivate Analytics)
- SCOPUS (Elsevier)
- Social Sciences Citation Index (Clarivate Analytics)
- Sociological Collection (EBSCO Publishing)

In 2018, ISI Journal Citation Reports ranked the journal 2/74 in Psychology Developmental journals, 6/77 in Psychology journals, and 11/142 in the category Psychiatry (Social Science); 16/146 (Psychiatry). The JCPP Impact Factor for 2018 is 6.129.

== See also ==
- Emanuel Miller Memorial Lectures
