= New mysterianism =

Philosophical position on the mind-body problem

New mysterianism, or commonly just mysterianism, is a philosophical position proposing that the hard problem of consciousness cannot be resolved by humans. The unresolvable problem is how to explain the existence of qualia (individual instances of subjective, conscious experience). In terms of the various schools of philosophy of mind, mysterianism is a form of nonreductive physicalism. Some "mysterians" state their case uncompromisingly (Colin McGinn has said that consciousness is "a mystery that human intelligence will never unravel"); others take a "pseudo-mysterian" stance, being of the belief that consciousness is not within the grasp of present human understanding, but may be comprehensible to future advances of science and technology.

== Name ==
Owen Flanagan noted in his 1991 book Science of the Mind that some modern thinkers have suggested that consciousness may never be completely explained. Flanagan called them "the new mysterians" after the rock group Question Mark and the Mysterians. He clarifies this term by stating "But the new mysterianism is a postmodern position designed to drive a railroad spike through the heart of scientism". The term "new mysterianism" has been extended by some writers to encompass the wider philosophical position that humans do not have the intellectual ability to solve (or comprehend the answers to) many hard problems, not just the problem of consciousness, at a scientific level. This position is also known as anti-constructive naturalism.

According to Flanagan, "The 'old mysterians' were dualists who thought that consciousness cannot be understood scientifically because it operates according to nonnatural principles and possesses nonnatural properties." Apparently, some apply the term to thinkers throughout history who suggested some aspect of consciousness may not be knowable or discoverable, including Gottfried Leibniz, Samuel Johnson, and Thomas Huxley. Thomas Huxley wrote, "[H]ow it is that anything so remarkable as a state of consciousness comes about as a result of irritating nervous tissue, is just as unaccountable as the appearance of the Djinn, when Aladdin rubbed his lamp."

The consciousness of brutes would appear to be related to the mechanism of their body simply as collateral product of its working, and to be completely without any power of modifying that working, as the steam-whistle which accompanies the work of a locomotive engine is without influence upon its machinery. Their volition, if they have any, is an emotion indicative of physical changes, not a cause of such changes ... The soul stands to the body as the bell of a clock to the works, and consciousness answers to the sound which the bell gives out when it is struck ... To the best of my judgment, the argumentation which applies to brutes holds good of men ... We are conscious automata.

— Thomas Huxley, On the Hypothesis that Animals are Automata, and its History (1874)

== Philosophy ==
In the view of the new mysterians, their contention that the hard problem of consciousness is unsolvable is not a presupposition, but rather a philosophical conclusion reached by thinking carefully about the issue. The standard argument is as follows:

Subjective experiences by their very nature cannot be shared or compared side-by-side. Therefore, it is impossible to know what subjective experiences another person is having.

Noam Chomsky distinguishes between problems, which seem solvable, at least in principle, through scientific methods, and mysteries, which do not seem solvable, even in principle. He notes that the cognitive capabilities of all organisms are limited by biology; e.g., a mouse will never be able to navigate a prime number maze. In the same way, certain problems may be beyond our understanding.

== Adherents ==
=== Historical ===
- William James, American philosopher, in his essay "Is Life Worth Living?" (1896). James makes the point that much human mental activity (e.g., reading) is forever closed to the mind of a dog, even though we may share the same household and have a deep friendship with each other. So, by analogy, the human mind may be forever closed to certain aspects of the larger universe. This was a concept which James found liberating, and which gave an implicit significance to certain distressing aspects of the human condition. James makes an analogy with the suffering of a dog during a vivisection: the meaning of the vivisection is inaccessible to the dog. But that does not mean that the vivisection is meaningless. So it may be with our suffering in this world.
- Carl Jung, Swiss psychiatrist and psychoanalyst, who, in the first chapter of his last work, Man and His Symbols (1964), wrote: "even when our senses react to real phenomena, sights and sounds, they are somehow translated from the realm of reality into that of the mind. Within the mind they become psychic events whose ultimate nature is unknowable (for the psyche cannot know its own psychical substance)."

=== Contemporary ===
- Colin McGinn is the leading proponent of the new mysterian position among major philosophers.
- Thomas Nagel, American philosopher.
- Jerry Fodor, American philosopher and cognitive scientist.
- Noam Chomsky, American linguist and cognitive scientist, has advanced a mysterian perspective, expressing that: "In brief, if we are biological organisms, not angels, much of what we seek to understand might lie beyond our cognitive limits—maybe a true understanding of anything, as Galileo concluded, and Newton in a certain sense demonstrated. That cognitive reach has limits is not only a truism, but also a fortunate one: if there were no limits to human intelligence, it would lack internal structure, and would therefore have no scope: we could achieve nothing by inquiry."
- Martin Gardner, American mathematics and science writer, considered himself to be a mysterian.
- John Horgan, American science journalist.
- Steven Pinker, American psychologist; favoured mysterianism in How the Mind Works, and later wrote: "The brain is a product of evolution, and just as animal brains have their limitations, we have ours. Our brains can't hold a hundred numbers in memory, can't visualize seven-dimensional space and perhaps can't intuitively grasp why neural information processing observed from the outside should give rise to subjective experience on the inside. This is where I place my bet, though I admit that the theory could be demolished when an unborn genius—a Darwin or Einstein of consciousness—comes up with a flabbergasting new idea that suddenly makes it all clear to us."
- Roger Penrose, English physicist, mathematician and philosopher of science.
- Edward Witten, American string theorist.
- Sam Harris, American neuroscientist, has endorsed mysterianism by stating that "This situation has been characterized as an 'explanatory gap' and the 'hard problem of consciousness', and it is surely both. I am sympathetic with those who, like ... McGinn and ... Pinker, have judged the impasse to be total: perhaps the emergence of consciousness is simply incomprehensible in human terms."

== Opponents ==
- Daniel Dennett, American philosopher, who has explicitly attacked McGinn's notion of mysterianism.

== See also ==
- Mind-body dualism
- Explanatory gap
- Eliminative materialism
