= Karl Sabbagh =

British writer (born 1942)

- Born: Khalil Sabbagh; 1942 (age 83–84); Evesham, Worcestershire, England, UK
- Occupations: Writer, journalist, producer
- Children: 4

Karl Sabbagh is a British writer, television producer, director and publisher. He has produced documentaries for the BBC, Channel 4 and PBS on science, medicine, architecture, engineering, aviation and space. His nonfiction books cover science, history and politics, including Palestinian history, and he has also written fiction. He co-founded Independent Communications Associates (InCA) in 1982, established Skyscraper Productions in 1990, and Skyscraper Publications in 2015.

== Biography ==
Sabbagh graduated from King's College, Cambridge, in 1964.

His father, Isa Khalil Sabbagh, was a Palestinian broadcaster who worked for the BBC Arabic Service from 1939 to 1948. Sabbagh has written about his family's Palestinian background and the displacement of Palestinians in 1948.

== Career ==
After graduating, Sabbagh joined the BBC as a graduate trainee and worked in its science programmes department. He contributed to programmes including Horizon, Inside Medicine and Controversy, as well as documentaries on science and technology. He left the BBC in 1978 after he was head-hunted to become director of the MSD Foundation. Four years later, he resigned after the Governors objected to him writing an article in World Medicine drawing attention to the terrorist background of the then Israeli PM, Menachem Begin.

In 1982, Sabbagh began working as an independent television producer for British and American broadcasters. He co-founded Independent Communications Associates and established Skyscraper Productions in 1990. The company produced documentary, music and drama programmes for broadcasters in the United Kingdom and the United States. Its projects included programmes on architecture, aviation, science and the arts.

From 2010 to 2015, Sabbagh was managing director of Hesperus Press, an independent publisher. He later established Skyscraper Publications, which publishes fiction and nonfiction, including his own novels.He published the English translation of the best-seller The Hundred-Year-Old Man Who Climbed Out the Window and Disappeared which sold over half a million copies in the UK.

=== Television ===
He was executive producer of The Body in Question, a 13-part television series written and presented by Jonathan Miller and co-produced with PBS. The series examined the human body and medical knowledge for a general audience. He also wrote and produced The Living Body, a 26-part series about the human body.

His productions for PBS included Skyscraper, which followed the design and construction of a Manhattan skyscraper, and Twenty-First Century Jet, a series documenting the development of Boeing's 777 aircraft, from computer design through to entry into passenger service. He also produced Voices of Victorian London, for the BBC Timewatch series. The programme was directed by Jonathan Miller and dramatized some of the interviews with poor working people carried out by the Victorian journalist Henry Mayhew. In 1996, Channel 4 invited Sabbagh to follow the conversion of a former power station into Tate Modern in London, in a series called Power Into Art. He also produced and directed 21st Century Jet, a television series following the design and construction of a new Boeing airliner, the 777. His company also produced 21st Century Airport, a series following the construction of Kansai International Airport in Japan. In 1998, Sabbagh produced and directed two documentaries for Channel 4 and PBS about the construction of the International Space Station.

He has also made films about Palestine and Israel. These include Healing the Spirit, about the Gaza Community Health Project, and After Jenin, produced in the aftermath of the Israeli military operation in the Jenin refugee camp in 2002. His later films have examined the history and consequences of the Balfour Declaration, Palestinian displacement and the question of a single state shared by Israelis and Palestinians. Palestine: The Reality explored the historical background of the declaration and its consequences for Palestinians. In 2025, he produced A Plan for Palestine: Return to a Single State, a short film presenting a proposed one-state future.

=== Books ===
His early books included The Living Body (1984), written with surgeon Christiaan Barnard, and Skyscraper: The Making of a Building (1989), which examined the design and construction of a high-rise building. Magic or Medicine? An Investigation of Healing and Healers (1993), co-written with physician Rob Buckman, examined claims made for alternative medicine and healing practices. Twenty-First Century Jet: The Making and Marketing of the 777 (1995) focused on the development of Boeing's 777 aircraft.

In A Rum Affair: A True Story of Botanical Fraud (1999), Sabbagh investigated a scientific controversy involving botanist John Heslop Harrison and disputed claims about plant discoveries on the Isle of Rum. The book examined the evidence and the questions it raised about scientific misconduct. It was shortlisted for the Los Angeles Times Science Book Prize in 2002.

His book Power into Art (2000) documented the conversion of a former power station into Tate Modern. His book Dr Riemann's Zeros (2002), published in the United States as The Riemann Hypothesis, introduced the Riemann hypothesis and its significance in mathematics.

Sabbagh's other books include Palestine: A Personal History (2006), which combined Palestinian history with his family's background; Remembering Our Childhood (2008), about early memory; and The Hair of the Dog and Other Scientific Surprises (2009), a collection of accounts of scientific topics and discoveries. The latter was featured as BBC Radio 4's Book of the Week in December 2009. His political writing includes The Antisemitism Wars (2018), which examined disputes over antisemitism and its treatment in British public debate.

=== Fiction ===
Since 2020, Sabbagh has written novels published by Skyscraper Publications. His mystery novels include a series featuring Alison Fox, a librarian at a Cambridge college who investigates crimes. The series began with Never Foxed and continued with Slightly Foxed. Other titles include A Shard of Guilt, The Late Mr Bradshaw and A Global Warning, published under the pen name Paul Zedane. His later books include Burn After Reading (2024), The Path to October 7th and Fruit of the Graydon Tree (2026).

== Personal life ==
Sabbagh is married and has four children.

In September 2019 Sabbagh was convicted of meeting a 15-year-old girl after grooming and served a prison sentence of 22 months.

== Bibliography ==
- The Living Body (1984; with Christiaan Barnard).
- Skyscraper: The Making of a Building (1989) (the story of the building of One Worldwide Plaza)
- Magic or Medicine?: An Investigation of Healing & Healers (1993; with Rob Buckman) (an investigation of alternative medicine)
- Twenty-First-Century Jet: The Making and Marketing of the Boeing 777 (1996)
- A Rum Affair: A True Story Of Botanical Fraud (1999) (about the botanical fraud perpetrated by John William Heslop-Harrison)
- Power into Art (2000) (the story of the redevelopment of Bankside power station as Tate Modern)
- Dr. Riemann's Zeros: The Search for the $1 Million Solution to the Greatest Problem in Mathematics (2002); The Riemann Hypothesis: The Greatest Unsolved Problem in Mathematics, 1st American edition (2003) (about the Riemann Hypothesis)
- Palestine: A Personal History (2006)
- Your Case is Hopeless: Bracing Advice From the Boy's Own Paper (2007)
- Remembering our Childhood: How Memory Betrays Us (2009)
- The Hair of the Dog and Other Scientific Surprises (2009)
- A Book of King's: Views of a Cambridge College (2010)
- The Trials of Lady Jane Douglas (2014)
- Antisemitism Wars: How the British Media Failed Their Public (2018) ISBN 9781911072362

== See also ==
- Palestinian Christians
