= Emanuel Miller Memorial Lectures =

The Emanuel Miller Memorial Lectures commemorate the British child psychiatrist Emanuel Miller (1892–1970). The Association for Child and Adolescent Mental Health began them in 1972.

== List ==
- 1972 Meyer Fortes, The First-born
- 1973 Jack Tizard, The Upbringing of Other People's Children: Implications of Research and for Research
- 1974 Leon Eisenberg, The Ethics of Intervention: Acting amidst Ambiguity
- 1975 Robert A. Hinde, On Describing Relationships
- 1976 Eric Midwinter, The Professional-Lay Relationship: A Victorian Legacy
- 1981 Michael Rutter, Stress, Coping and Development: Some Issues and Some Questions
- 1982 (9th) Jerome Kagan, The Emergence of Self
- 1987 P. H. Venables, Childhood markers for adult disorders
- 1990 Neville Bennett, Cooperative Learning in Classrooms: Processes and Outcomes
- 1991 Christopher Gillberg, Autism and autistic-like conditions
- 1992 Peter Fonagy, The theory and practice of resilience
- 1993 Robert Plomin, Genetic research and identification of environmental influences
- 1994 M. Kovacs, Depressive disorders in childhood: an impressionistic landscape
- 1995 J. Dunn, Children's relationships: bridging the divide between cognitive and social development
- 1996 M. Main, Current Issues in Attachment
- 1997 M. Sigman, Change and continuity in the development of children with autism.
- 1998 Michael Rutter, Autism: Two-way interplay between research and clinical work
- 2000 William Yule, From Pogroms to "Ethnic Cleansing": Meeting the Needs of War Affected Children
- 2001 Jay Belsky, Developmental Risks (Still) Associated with Early Child Care
- 2004 Uta Frith, Confusions and controversies about Asperger syndrome
- 2006 Femmie Juffer, Adoption as intervention
- 2008 Ian M. Goodyer, Early onset depressions – meanings, mechanisms and processes
- 2009 Michael Rutter, Attachment insecurity, disinhibited attachment, and attachment disorders: where do research findings leave the concepts?
- 2012 D. V. M. Bishop, Neuroscientific studies of intervention for language impairment in children: interpretive and methodological problems
- 2018 announcement, Sir Robin Murray

== See also ==
- Child and Adolescent Mental Health
- Journal of Child Psychology and Psychiatry
