= Emanuel Miller =

British psychiatrist (1892–1970)

Emanuel Miller (26 August 1892 – 29 July 1970) was a British psychiatrist. He is best known for his work on child psychology.

== Life ==
Miller was born on 26 August 1892 into a Lithuanian Jewish family in Spitalfields, London, and was educated at Parmiter's School and the City of London School. He entered St John's College, Cambridge in 1911, and later went to the London Hospital Medical College, gaining a medical diploma in 1918. He then took the Cambridge diploma of psychological medicine, in 1921.

Miller founded a child guidance clinic, the first in the United Kingdom, at the Jews Free School in 1927, which he ran with psychologist Meyer Fortes (later a prominent anthropologist) and Sybil Clement Brown. He later worked at the Tavistock Clinic. During World War II he served in the RAMC, and helped form the Campaign for Mental Health. In later life he suffered from depression and severe rheumatoid arthritis. He died on 29 July 1970.

One of those who has been called "father of British child psychiatry", Miller shares the appellation with Michael Rutter and Donald Winnicott.

== Family ==
Miller married Betty Spiro in 1933. The couple had a daughter, Sarah, and a son, Jonathan.

== See also ==
- Emanuel Miller Memorial Lectures
