= Jonathan Miller =

English theatre director (1934–2019)

Sir Jonathan Miller CBE
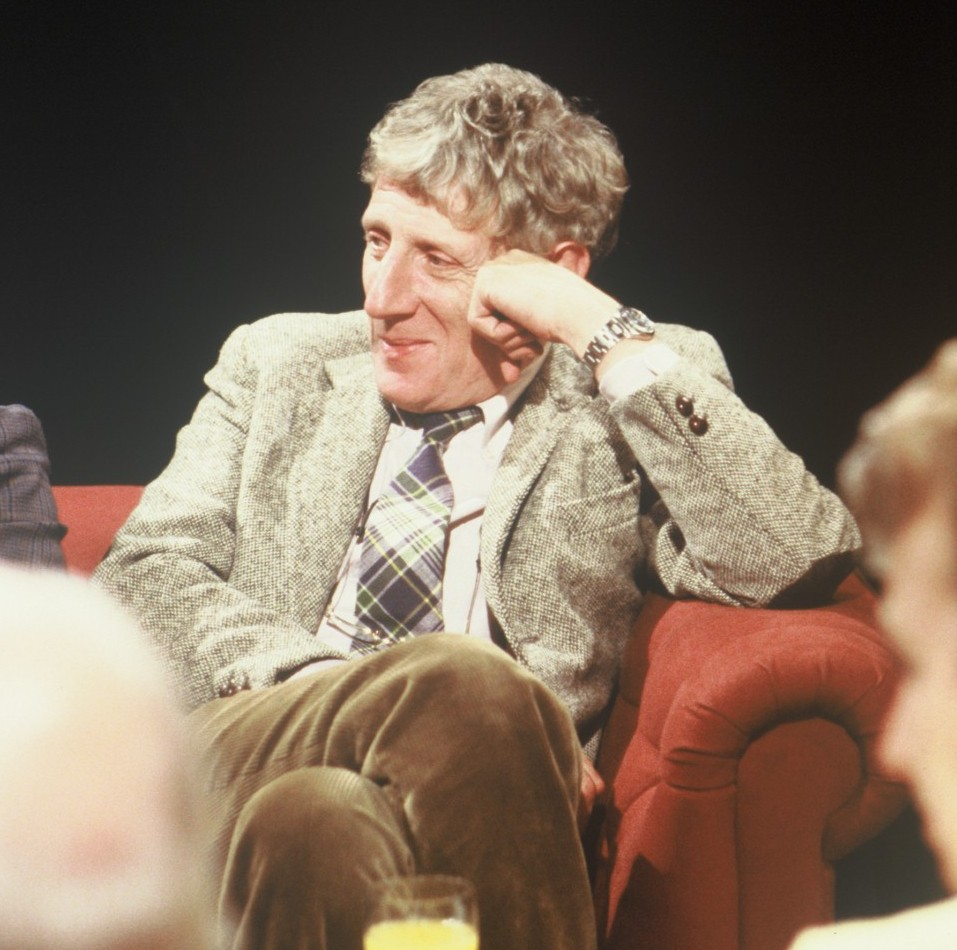
- Appearing on TV discussion After Dark in 1988: "Alternative Medicine"
- Born: Jonathan Wolfe Miller; 21 July 1934; St John's Wood, London, England
- Died: 27 November 2019 (aged 85); London, England
- Resting place: Highgate Cemetery
- Education: St John's College, Cambridge (MB BChir, 1959)
- Occupations: Comedian; physician; theatre and opera director; actor; television presenter; author
- Spouse: Rachel Collet (m. 1956)
- Children: 3
- Parents: Emanuel Miller (father); Betty Miller (née Spiro) (mother)

Sir Jonathan Wolfe Miller CBE (21 July 1934 – 27 November 2019) was an English theatre and opera director, actor, author, television presenter, comedian and physician. After training in medicine and specialising in neurology in the late 1950s, he came to prominence in the early 1960s in the comedy revue Beyond the Fringe with Peter Cook, Dudley Moore and Alan Bennett. He popularised anatomy in The Body in Question.

Appointed by Laurence Olivier, Miller served as an associate director at the 11-year-old National Theatre from 1973 to 1975, right after the company's move to its current home. He would later (1988 to 1990) run its previous home, the Old Vic Theatre. Miller began directing operas in the 1970s; his 1982 English National Opera production of a mafioso Rigoletto was set in 1950s Little Italy, Manhattan. As a writer and presenter of more than a dozen BBC documentaries, Miller grew to become a television personality and public intellectual in Britain and the United States.

== Life and career ==
=== Early life ===
Miller grew up in St John's Wood, London, in a well-connected Jewish family. His father Emanuel (1892–1970), who was of Lithuanian descent and suffered from severe rheumatoid arthritis, was a military psychiatrist and subsequently a paediatric psychiatrist at Harley House. His mother, Betty Miller (née Spiro) (1910–1965), was a novelist and biographer who was originally from County Cork, Ireland. Miller had an elder sister, Sarah (died 2006) who worked in television for many years and retained an involvement with Judaism that Miller, as an atheist, always eschewed. As a child Miller had a stammer and was attention-seeking, compensating for his stammer by speaking in foreign accents. He also developed an astonishing talent for mimicry, including chickens and steamtrains. The young Miller was assessed by several child psychiatrists, including Donald Winnicott. He had many sessions as a teenager with the psychiatrist Leopold Stein. Miller enjoyed the sessions and said that they "simply conversed about philosophy and Hughlings Jackson's early neurological theories".

Miller moved between several different schools prior to attending Taunton School, including for a time at the Rudolf Steiner School Kings Langley (a Waldorf school) where he was taught by two of Ivy Compton-Burnett's sisters. He said of that time that he "never learnt anything at all". Miller concluded his secondary school education at St Paul's School, London where he developed an early (and ultimately lifelong) interest in the biological sciences. While at St Paul's School at the age of 12, Miller met and became close friends with Oliver Sacks and Sacks's best friend Eric Korn, friendships which remained crucial throughout the rest of their lives. In 1953, before leaving secondary school, he performed comedy several times on the BBC radio programme Under Twenty Parade. Miller studied natural sciences and medicine at St John's College, Cambridge (MB BChir, 1959), where he was a member of the Cambridge Apostles, before going on to train at University College Hospital in London.

While studying medicine, Miller was involved in the Cambridge Footlights, appearing in the revues Out of the Blue (1954) and Between the Lines (1955). Good reviews for these shows, and for Miller's performances in particular, led to his performing on a number of radio and television shows while continuing his studies; these included appearances on Saturday Night on the Light, Tonight and Sunday Night at the London Palladium. He qualified as a physician in 1959 and then worked as a hospital house officer for two years, including at the Central Middlesex Hospital as house physician for gastroenterologist Francis Avery Jones.

=== 1960s: Beyond the Fringe ===
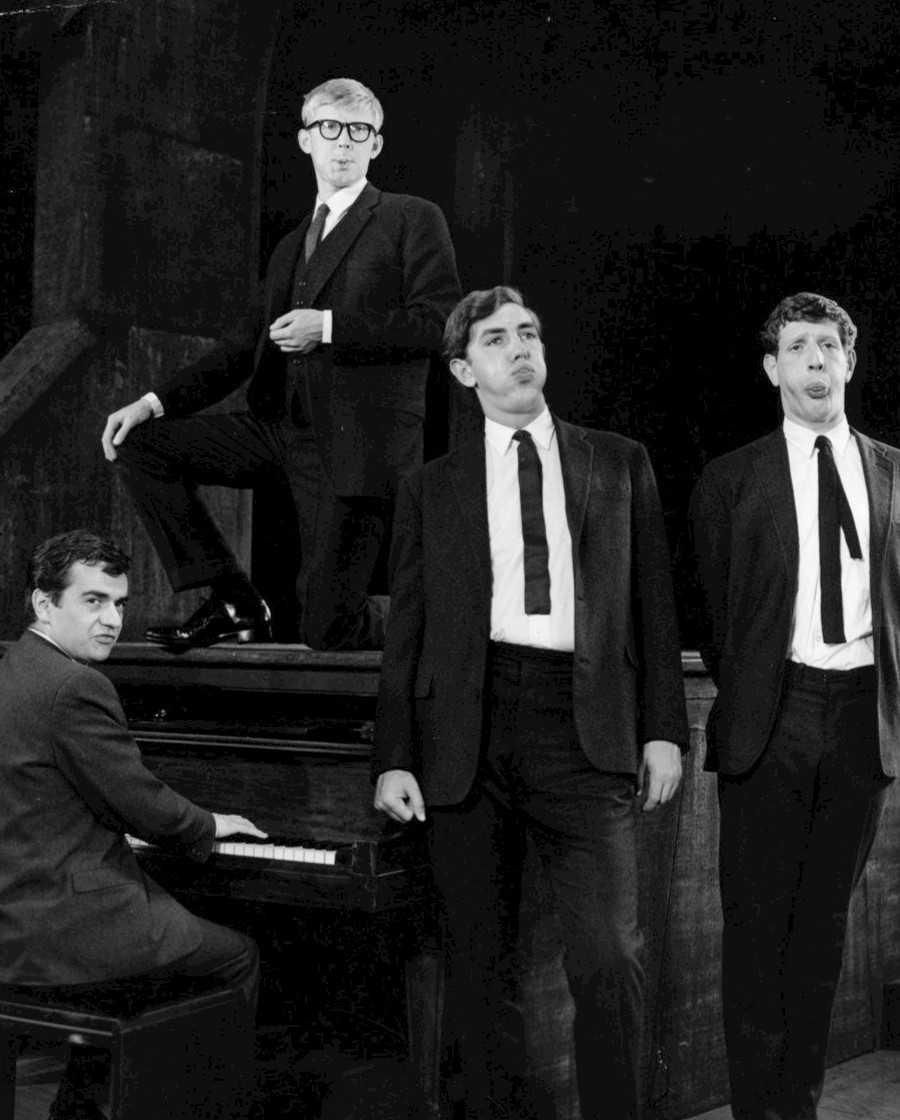
Miller (far right) in Beyond the Fringe on Broadway, with (from left) Dudley Moore, Alan Bennett and Peter Cook

Miller helped to write and produce the satirical revue Beyond the Fringe, which premiered at the Edinburgh Festival in August 1960. This launched, in addition to his own, the careers of Alan Bennett, Peter Cook and Dudley Moore. Miller quit the show shortly after its move from London to Broadway in 1962, and took over as editor and presenter of the BBC's arts programme Monitor in 1965. The Monitor appointment arose because Miller had approached Huw Wheldon about taking up a place on the BBC's director training course. Wheldon assured him that he would "pick it up as he went along".

Miller's first experience of directing a stage play was for John Osborne, whose Under Plain Cover he directed in 1962. In 1964, he directed the play The Old Glory by the American poet Robert Lowell in New York City. It was the first play produced at the American Place Theatre and starred Frank Langella, Roscoe Lee Brown, and Lester Rawlins. The play won five Obie Awards in 1965 including an award for "Best American Play" as well as awards for Langella, Brown and Rawlins.

He wrote, produced, and directed Alice in Wonderland (1966) for the BBC. He followed this with Whistle and I'll Come to You (1968), an adaptation of M. R. James's 1904 ghost story 'Oh, Whistle, and I'll Come to You, My Lad' starring Michael Hordern. He produced a National Theatre Company production of The Merchant of Venice starring Laurence Olivier. He later resigned as associate director.

=== 1970s: Medical history and opera ===
Miller held a research fellowship in the history of medicine at University College London from 1970 to 1973. In 1974, he also started directing and producing operas for Kent Opera and Glyndebourne, followed by a new production of The Marriage of Figaro for English National Opera in 1978. Miller's other turns as an opera director included productions of Rigoletto (in 1975 and 1982) and the operetta The Mikado (in 1987).

Miller drew upon his own experiences as a physician, writer and presenter of the BBC television series The Body in Question (1978). The series was nominated for two 1979 BAFTAs: Best Factual Television Series and Most Original Programme/Series and caused some controversy for showing the dissection of a cadaver. For a time, he was a vice-president of the Campaign for Homosexual Equality. In 1971, he defended multiracial immigration to the UK at length with Enoch Powell on The Dick Cavett Show.

=== 1980s: Shakespeare and neuropsychology ===
In 1980, Miller was persuaded to join the troubled BBC Television Shakespeare project (1978–85). He became a producer (1980–82) and directed six of the plays himself, beginning with a well-received Taming of the Shrew starring John Cleese. In the early 1980s, Miller was a popular and frequent guest on PBS' Dick Cavett Show.

Miller wrote and presented the BBC television series, and accompanying book, States of Mind in 1983 and the same year directed Roger Daltrey as Macheath, the outlaw hero of the BBC's production of John Gay's 1728 ballad opera, The Beggar's Opera. He also became chair of Edinburgh Festival Fringe board of directors. In 1984, he studied neuropsychology with Dr. Sandra Witelson at McMaster University in Hamilton, Ontario, Canada, before becoming a neuropsychology research fellow at the University of Sussex the following year.

=== 1990s ===
In 1990, Miller wrote and presented a joint BBC/Canadian production titled, Born Talking: A Personal Inquiry into Language. The four-part series looked into the acquisition of language, and complexities surrounding language production, with a special focus on sign language used by deaf people. This interest was contemporaneous with his friend Oliver Sacks' immersion in, and writing/publishing a book about Deaf Culture and deaf people entitled Seeing Voices. Miller then wrote and presented the television series Madness (1991) and Jonathan Miller on Reflection (1998). The five-part Madness series ran on PBS in 1991. It featured a brief history of madness and interviews with psychiatric researchers, clinical psychiatrists, and patients in therapy sessions. In 1992, Opera Omaha staged the United States premiere of the Gioachino Rossini's 1819 opera Ermione, directed by Miller.

=== 2000s: Atheism and return to directing ===
In 2002 Miller directed Cosi fan tutte at Rønne Theater (1813) in Rønne, Bornholm in Denmark. In 2004, Miller wrote and presented a television series on atheism entitled Atheism: A Rough History of Disbelief (more commonly referred to as Jonathan Miller's Brief History of Disbelief) for BBC Four, exploring the roots of his own atheism and investigating the history of atheism in the world. Individual conversations, debates and discussions for the series that could not be included due to time constraints were aired in a six-part series entitled The Atheism Tapes. He also appeared on a BBC Two programme in February 2004, called What the World Thinks of God appearing from New York. The original three-part series aired on public television in the United States in 2007.

In 2007, Miller directed The Cherry Orchard at The Crucible, Sheffield, his first work on the British stage for 10 years. He also directed Monteverdi's L'Orfeo in Manchester and Bristol, and Der Rosenkavalier in Tokyo and gave talks throughout Britain during 2007 called An Audience with Jonathan Miller in which he spoke about his life for an hour and then fielded questions from the audience. He also curated an exhibition on camouflage at the Imperial War Museum. He appeared at the Royal Society of the Arts in London discussing humour (4 July 2007) and at the British Library on religion (3 September 2007).

In January 2009, after a break of 12 years, Miller returned to the English National Opera to direct his own production of La bohème, notable for its 1930s setting. This same production ran at the Cincinnati Opera in July 2010, also directed by Miller.

=== 2010s ===
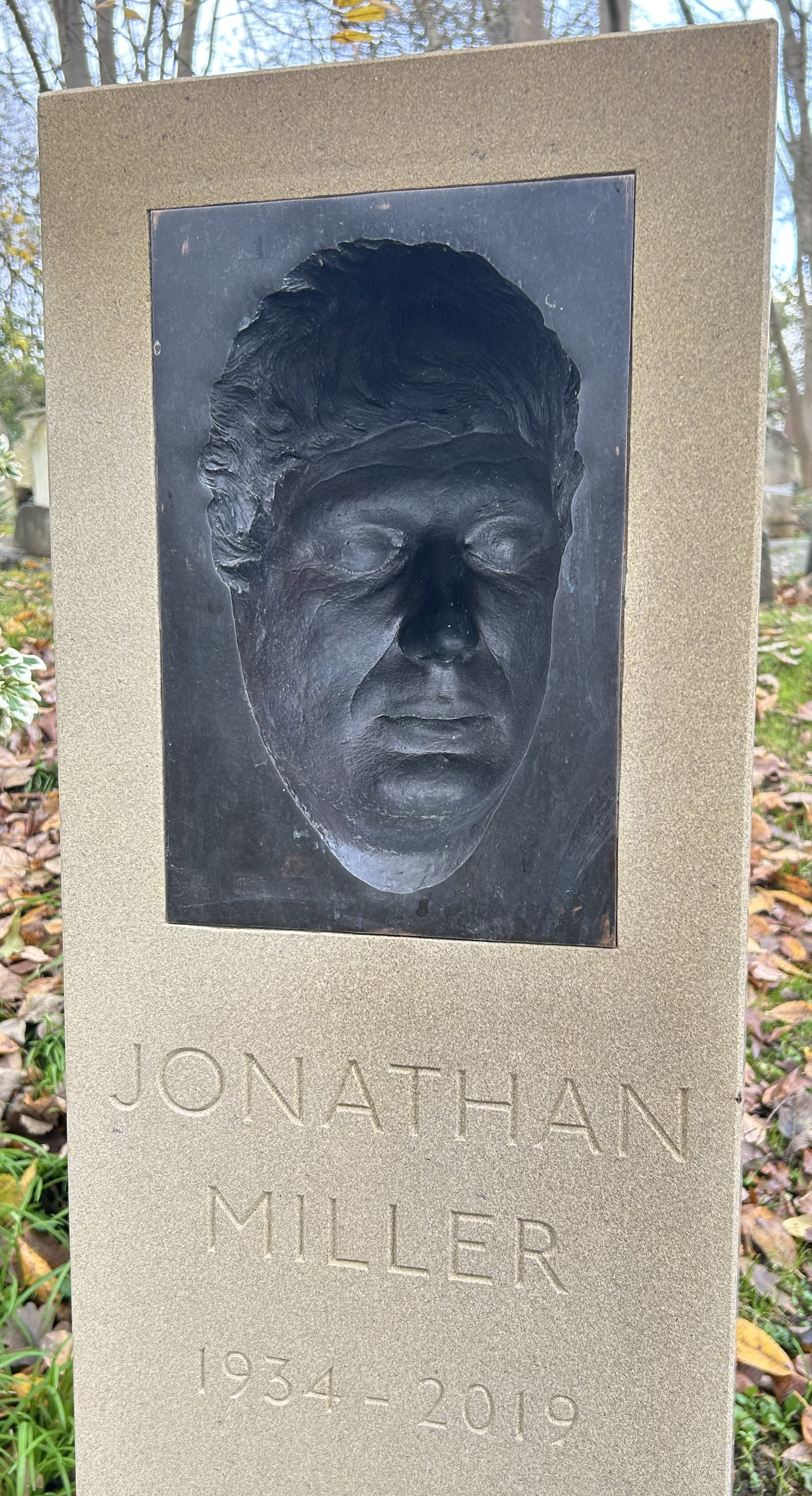
Grave of Jonathan Miller in Highgate Cemetery

On 15 September 2010, Miller, along with 54 other public figures, signed an open letter published in The Guardian, stating their opposition to Pope Benedict XVI's state visit to the UK. In April and May 2011, Miller directed Verdi's La traviata in Vancouver, Canada, and in February and March 2012, Mozart's Così fan tutte in Washington, D.C.

On 25 November 2015, the University of London awarded Miller an honorary degree in literature.

=== Personal life ===
Miller married Rachel Collet in 1956. They had two sons and a daughter. From 1961 to his death he lived on Gloucester Crescent in Camden Town, north London. On 27 November 2019, Miller died at the age of 85, having been diagnosed with Alzheimer's in 2017. His ashes were interred on the eastern side of Highgate Cemetery, opposite the grave of Karl Marx, on 21 October 2022.

== Parodies and representations ==
- Stevie Smith, a friend of his mother Betty Miller, "rather disloyally" included a thinly disguised and uncomplimentary version of the nine-year-old Miller, "precocious and brattish... constantly demanding attention", in her short story 'Beside the Seaside: A Holiday with Children' (1949).
- Private Eye (which had a falling-out with Miller) occasionally lampooned him under the name "Dr Jonathan", depicting him as a Dr Johnson-like self-important man of learning.
- In the film for television Not Only But Always about the careers of Peter Cook and Dudley Moore, Jonathan Aris played Jonathan Miller as a young man; Aris reprised the role in the BBC Radio 4 play Good Evening (2008) by Roy Smiles.
- Along with the other members of Beyond the Fringe, he is portrayed in the play Pete and Dud: Come Again by Chris Bartlett and Nick Awde.
- In the BBC Radio Three series The Burkiss Way edition 35, broadcast on 2 April 1979, he was impersonated by Nigel Rees in a fairly lengthy parody "The Blood Gushing All over the Screen in Question", in which the history of unpleasant diseases was traced and the style of Miller's presentation was sent up. It was written by Andrew Marshall and David Renwick.
- In the 1980s a puppet of Miller appeared frequently in Spitting Image sketches, most notably "Bernard Levin and Jonathan Miller Talk Bollocks".

== Honours and awards ==
- Special Tony Award (1963), with co-stars Alan Bennett, Peter Cook, and Dudley Moore, "for their brilliance which has shattered all the old concepts of comedy" in the musical revue Beyond the Fringe.
- Distinguished Supporter, Humanists UK.
- Honorary Associate, National Secular Society.
- Honorary Fellow, University College London.
- Honorary Fellow, Royal College of Art.
- Associate member, Royal Academy of Dramatic Art.
- Honorary Fellow, St John's College, Cambridge (1982).
- Honorary Fellow, Royal College of Physicians (London and Edinburgh).
- Honorary D.Phil., University of Cambridge.
- Commander of the Order of the British Empire (CBE; 1983).
- Nomination: Best Director Tony Award (1986), for his revival of O'Neill's Long Day's Journey into Night.
- Knight Bachelor (2002), for services to music and the arts.
- Nominated artist of honour at Bornholm thanks to his instruction in Rønne Theater (Opera Island Bornholm; 2003).
- Foreign Member, American Academy of Arts and Sciences.
- President, Rationalist Association (2006–2019)
- Lifetime Achievement Award, Medical Journalists' Association (2012)

== Bibliography ==
=== Books ===
- Miller, Jonathan (1971). McLuhan. Fontana Modern Masters.
- Miller, Jonathan (1971). Censorship and the Limits of Personal Freedom. Oxford University Press.
- Miller, Jonathan (1972). Freud: The Man, His World and His Influence. Weidenfeld and Nicolson.
- Miller, Jonathan (1974). The Uses of Pain (Conway memorial lecture). South Place Ethical Society.
- Miller, Jonathan (1978). The Body in Question. Jonathan Cape.
- Miller, Jonathan (1982). Darwin for Beginners. Writers and Readers Comic Book/2003 Pantheon Books (USA). ISBN 0-375-71458-8.
- Miller, Jonathan (1983). The Human Body. Viking Press. (1994 Jonathan Cape [pop-up book])
- Miller, Jonathan (1983). States of Mind. Conversations with Psychological Investigators. BBC /Random House.
- Miller, Jonathan (1984). "The Facts of Life". Canadian Medical Association Journal. 94 (3). Jonathan Cape: 147. PMC 1935180. PMID 20328473. (pop-up book intended for children)
- Miller, Jonathan (1986). Subsequent Performances. Faber.
- Miller, Jonathan & John Durrant (1989). Laughing Matters: A Serious Look at Humour. Longman.
- Miller, Jonathan (1990). Acting in Opera. Applause Theatre & Cinema Books. (The Applause Acting Series)
- Miller, Jonathan (1992). The Afterlife of Plays. San Diego State Univ Press. (University Research Lecture Series No. 5)
- Miller, Jonathan (1998). Dimensional Man. Jonathan Cape.
- Miller, Jonathan (1998). On Reflection. National Gallery Publications/Yale University Press (USA). ISBN 0-300-07713-0.
- Miller, Jonathan (1999). Nowhere in Particular. Mitchell Beazley. ISBN 978-1840001501. [collection of his photographs]

=== Editor ===
- Miller, Jonathan (1968). Harvey and the Circulation of Blood: A Collection of Contemporary Documents. Jackdaw Publications.
- Miller, Jonathan (1990). The Don Giovanni Book: Myths of Seduction and Betrayal. Faber.

=== Contributor ===
- Miller, Jonathan; Alan Bennett; Peter Cook; Dudley Moore (1963). Beyond the Fringe. A Revue. Souvenir Press/Samuel French.
- Miller, Jonathan; Margaret Drabble; Richard Hoggart; Adrian Mitchell; et al. (1969). The Permissive Society. Panther.
- Miller, Jonathan; Alan Bennett; Peter Cook; Dudley Moore (1987). The Complete Beyond the Fringe. Methuen. ISBN 0-413-14670-7.
- Sokol, B. J., ed. (1993). The Undiscover'd Country: New Essays on Psychoanalysis and Shakespeare. Free Association Books. ISBN 1-85343-197-4. – Jonathan Miller: "King Lear in Rehearsal: A Talk" and seven other essays
- Jonathan Miller; Stephen Jay Gould; Daniel J Kevles; RC Lewontin; Oliver Sacks (1997). Silvers, Robert B. (ed.). Hidden Histories of Science. Granta Books.
- Silvers, Robert B., ed. (2000). Doing It : Five Performing Arts. New York Review of Books (USA). ISBN 0-940322-75-7.. Essays by Jonathan Miller Geoffrey O'Brien, Charles Rosen, Tom Stoppard and Garry Wills

=== Introductions and forewords ===
- Lowell, Robert (1966). Old Glory, The: Endecott and the Red Cross; My Kinsman, Major Molineux; and Benito Cereno. (directors note)
- Rothenstein, Julian (2000). The Paradox Box: Optical Illusions, Puzzling Pictures, Verbal Diversions. Redstons Press / Shambhala Publications (USA).
- Scotson, Linda (2000). Doran: Child of Courage. Macmillan.

== Discography ==
=== Actor ===
- Bridge on the River Wye (1962 Parlophone LP; as American Announcer, American G.I., American Lieutenant, British Sergeant)

== Filmography ==
=== Actor ===
- Beyond the Fringe (1964), TV version.
- One Way Pendulum (1964)
- Sensitive Skin (as "Dr Cass", 2 episodes, 2005)

=== Director ===
- Alice in Wonderland (1966; BBC television drama; Also writer and producer; Provides commentary track on DVD version)
- Whistle and I'll Come to You (1968; BBC television drama).
- Take a Girl Like You (1970, starring Hayley Mills).
- BBC Television Shakespeare (1978–85):
  - The Taming of the Shrew (1980), starring John Cleese.
  - Timon of Athens (1981), starring Jonathan Pryce.
  - Antony and Cleopatra (1981), starring Colin Blakely.
  - Othello (1981), starring Anthony Hopkins and Bob Hoskins.
  - Troilus and Cressida (1981).
  - King Lear (1982), starring Michael Hordern.
- The Beggar's Opera (1983; BBC television opera), starring Roger Daltrey and Bob Hoskins.

=== Presenter-writer ===
- Monitor (1962; also editor).
- The Zoo in Winter (1969), BBC, directed by Patrick Garland.
- The Body in Question (1978–79), 13 episodes.
- Equinox - Prisoner of Consciousness (1986)
- Born Talking: A Personal Inquiry into Language (1990), 4 episodes.
- Madness (1991).
- Equinox - Moving Pictures (1991)
- Jonathan Miller's Opera Works (1997), 6 episodes.
- Jonathan Miller on Reflection (1998).
- Absolute Rubbish with Jonathan Miller (2004)
- Atheism: A Rough History of Disbelief (2004), 3 episodes.
- The Atheism Tapes (2004).

=== Interviewee ===
- In 1988 Miller made an extended appearance on the discussion programme After Dark, described here.
- BBC. Great Composers of the World. Miller appears on the Puccini and Bach DVDs of this BBC series. In the Bach episode, he discusses his affection for the famous "Erbarme Dich" aria of the St Matthew Passion.
- PBS. Vermeer: Master of Light. Miller appears in this one-hour program on the painter.

== Selected stage productions ==
=== Musical revue ===
- Beyond the Fringe (performer, writer, producer; Edinburgh Festival; 1960).
- Beyond the Fringe (performer, writer; Fortune Theatre, London; 1961–62).
- Beyond the Fringe (performer, writer; John Golden Theatre. NYC; 27 October 1962 to 30 May 1964; 667 performances).

=== Oratorio ===
- St Matthew Passion (Director; St. George's Theatre, London, February 1994) with Paul Goodwin. A dramatised production of J. S. Bach's masterpiece, recorded for BBC Television. This production was also revived at London's National Theatre in September/October 2011 with Southbank Sinfonia, conducted by Paul Goodwin.

=== Drama ===
- The Old Glory (Director; American Place Theatre, 1964) starring Frank Langella, Roscoe Lee Brown, and Lester Rawlins.
- The Merchant of Venice (Director; Cambridge Theatre, 1970) starring Laurence Olivier.
- Danton's Death (Director; 1972) starring Christopher Plummer.
- Long Day's Journey into Night (Director; Broadhurst Theatre, 28 April to 29 June 1986; 54 performances), starring Jack Lemmon.
- Camera Obscura (Director; Almeida Theatre, 13 May to 8 June 2002; Theatre Royal, Bath, 11 to 15 June 2002; Theatre Royal, Winchester, 18 to 22 June 2002; The Oxford Playhouse 25 to 29 June 2002, starring Peter Eyre, and Diana Hardcastle.
- King Lear (Director; Vivian Beaumont Theater 4 March to 18 April 2004; 33 performances).
- The Cherry Orchard (Director; Crucible Theatre, 2007).

=== Opera ===
Over four decades, Miller has directed more than 50 operas in cities including London, New York, Florence, Milan, Berlin, Munich, Zurich, Valencia and Tokyo.

- Così fan tutte (Stage director; Kent Opera, 1974). The first of seven operas Miller directed for Kent Opera.
- Rigoletto (Stage director; 1975). Set in the 19th century.
- The Cunning Little Vixen (Producer; Glyndebourne, 1975).
- Le nozze di Figaro (Stage director; English National Opera, 1978). A televised version was made in 1991.
- Rigoletto (Stage and video director; English National Opera, 1982). Set in 1950s Little Italy, Manhattan.
- The Mikado (Stage and video director; English National Opera, 1987) starring Eric Idle.
- La traviata (Stage director; Glimmerglass Opera, 1989).
- Kát'a Kabanová (Stage director and producer; Metropolitan Opera, 1991).
- La fanciulla del West (Stage and video director; 1991).
- Pelléas et Mélisande (Stage director and producer; Metropolitan Opera, 1995).
- Rodelinda (Stage director; Salomons Science Theatre, Tunbridge Wells, 1996).
- The Rake's Progress (Stage director and producer; Metropolitan Opera, 1997).
- Le nozze di Figaro (Stage director and producer; Metropolitan Opera, 1998).
- Die Zauberflöte (Stage and video director; 2000).
- Tamerlano (Stage and video director; 2001).
- Die Entführung aus dem Serail (Stage and video director; 2003).
- Falstaff (Stage director; New National Theatre Tokyo, 2004).
- Jenůfa (Stage director; Glimmerglass Opera with New York City Opera in Cooperstown, New York, 29 July to 29 August 2006).
- L'Elisir d'Amore (Stage director; New York City Opera, October 2007).
- L'Orfeo (Stage director; Manchester and Bristol productions, 2007).
- Der Rosenkavalier (Stage director; New National Theatre Tokyo, 2007).
- La traviata (Stage director; Glimmerglass Opera, 2009).
- La bohème (Stage director; Cincinnati Opera, 2010).
- Pelléas et Mélisande (Stage director; Metropolitan Opera, 2005 and 2010).
- La traviata (Director; Vancouver Opera, 2011)).
- Miller's most recent opera productions in England were Cosi fan tutte and Don Pasquale at the Royal Opera House (both revived in 2012) and La bohème and L'elisir d'amore at the English National Opera. His production of Rigoletto at the ENO is still being revived after 28 years and his production of The Mikado is about to return in its 25th year. His 1987 ENO production of The Barber of Seville has often been revived, most recently in 2017.

== Museum and gallery exhibitions ==
- Miller curated an exhibition on "Reflexion" (1998) at the National Gallery and one on "Motion in Art and Photography" at the Estorick Gallery in Islington.
- Miller had three exhibitions of his own art work at Flowers East, the Boundary Gallery and at the Katz Gallery in Bond Street, London.

== See also ==
- Las Meninas – considered by Miller in his On Reflection
