= Child and Adolescent Mental Health =

- Discipline: Clinical psychology, pediatrics, psychiatry
- Language: English
- Edited by: Dennis Ougrin

Publication details
- History: 1996-present
- Publisher: Wiley-Blackwell on behalf of the Association for Child and Adolescent Mental Health (United Kingdom)
- Frequency: Quarterly
- Impact factor: 1.439 (2018)

Standard abbreviations
- ISO 4: Child Adolesc. Ment. Health

Indexing
- ISSN: 1475-357X (print); 1475-3588 (web)
- LCCN: 2002243301
- OCLC no.: 49884752

Links
- Journal homepage; Online access; Online archive

Child and Adolescent Mental Health (CAMH) is a quarterly peer-reviewed medical journal published by Wiley-Blackwell in Britain on behalf of the Association for Child and Adolescent Mental Health. The journal publishes peer-refereed child and adolescent mental health services research relevant to academics, clinicians and commissioners internationally. CAMH publishes reviews, original articles, and pilot reports of innovative approaches, interventions, clinical methods and service developments. The journal has regular sections on Measurement Issues, Innovations in Practice, Global Child Mental Health and Humanities.

According to the Journal Citation Reports, the journal has a 2018 impact factor of 1.439.

== Publication history ==
The Association's clinical journal started off in 1977 as an informal publication - 'The News' - before becoming metamorphosing into the Newsletter (1984), the Newsletter and Review (1993), the Child Psychology and Psychiatry Review (CPPR) (1996); and finally CAMH (2002). Its evolution saw the development of features and columns such as Journal Monitor and Book Reviews, Personal Profiles, Thoughts from Abroad, Points of Law and Measurement Issues.

== Abstracting and indexing information ==
The journal is abstracted and indexed in the following:

- Academic Search (EBSCO Publishing)
- Academic Search Alumni Edition (EBSCO Publishing)
- Academic Search Premier (EBSCO Publishing)
- Criminal Justice Abstracts (EBSCO Publishing)
- Current Contents: Clinical Medicine (Clarivate Analytics)
- Current Contents: Social & Behavioral Sciences (Clarivate Analytics)
- Embase (Elsevier)
- Health Research Premium Collection (ProQuest)
- Hospital Premium Collection (ProQuest)
- ProQuest Central (ProQuest)
- ProQuest Central K-107
- ProQuest Central K-108
- Psychology & Behavioral Sciences Collection (EBSCO Publishing)
- Psychology Collection (GALE Cengage)
- Psychology Database (ProQuest)
- PsycINFO/Psychological Abstracts (APA)
- Science Citation Index Expanded (Clarivate Analytics)
- SCOPUS (Elsevier)
- Social Sciences Citation Index (Clarivate Analytics)
- Web of Science (Clarivate Analytics)

== See also ==
- Journal of Child Psychology and Psychiatry
- Emanuel Miller Memorial Lectures
