= Doxastic voluntarism =

Philosophical view that people elect their own beliefs

Doxastic voluntarism is a philosophical view that people elect their own beliefs; that is, that subjects have a certain amount of control over what they believe, such that a subject may choose whether or not to believe a certain thing. This philosophical view is derived from a branch of logic known as doxastic logic; however, as opposed to other philosophical views on belief, doxastic voluntarism claims each human agent as the author of their own beliefs. Doxastic voluntarism falls under the branch of philosophy known as ethics of belief.

Philosophers distinguish two types of doxastic voluntarism: direct doxastic voluntarism and indirect doxastic voluntarism. Direct doxastic voluntarism being that the person has control over some of their beliefs (e.g. an individual changes his belief from theism to atheism) and indirect doxastic voluntarism is that the person has unintended control, through voluntary intermediate actions, over some of their beliefs (e.g. researching and unintentionally evaluating the evidence).

== See also ==
- "The Ethics of Belief" at the Stanford Encyclopedia of Philosophy
