= Richard Denton =

British biochemist

Richard (Dick) Michael Denton FRS FMedSci (born 16 October 1941) is a British biochemist, and emeritus professor at University of Bristol.

== Life ==
He earned a PhD in 1967 at the University of Cambridge, where he studied with Sir Philip Randle.

He was elected Fellow of both the Royal Society and the Academy of Medical Sciences in 1998.

== Works ==
- Richard Michael Denton, C. I. Pogson, Metabolic regulation, Chapman and Hall, 1976, ISBN 978-0-470-15126-6
- P. J. Randle, Richard Michael Denton, Hormones and cell metabolism, Oxford University Press, 1974, ISBN 978-0-19-914153-1
