= Edmund Sonuga-Barke =

British psychologist and academic (born 1962)

Edmund James Stephen Sonuga-Barke, FBA, FMedSci, MAE, (born 1962) is a developmental psychologist and academic. He has held professorships at King's College London (since 2017) and the University of Southampton (1997–2017).

== Early life and education ==
Edmund James Stephen Barke was born in Derby in 1962; he later adopted a double-barrelled surname for his academic work, combining his family name with that of his wife, Funke Sonuga, whom he married in 1987. They have two children. He graduated with a Bachelor of Science degree in psychology from the University College of North Wales, Bangor, in 1984, and four years later the University of Exeter awarded him a doctorate for his thesis "Studies in the development of economic behaviour".

== Career ==
After a year as a research psychologist at the University of London, Sonuga-Barke was appointed to a lectureship at the Institute of Psychiatry in 1988. The next year, he moved to the University of Southampton where he was lecturer (1989–95), reader (1995–97) and professor (from 1997) of developmental psychopathology. He was head of Southampton's Department of Psychology from 1997 to 2002. In 2017, Sonuga-Barke joined King's College London as Professor of Developmental Psychology, Psychiatry and Neuroscience. In 2016, he was elected a Fellow of the Academy of Medical Sciences and in 2018 he was elected a Fellow of the British Academy, the United Kingdom's national academy for the humanities and social sciences. In 2023 he was elected to the Academia Europaea. In 2019 he was made an Honorary Skou Professor at Aarhus University, Denmark, and in 2023, a Visiting Research Professor at the University of Hong Kong. He is the editor-in-chief of the Journal of Child Psychology & Psychiatry.

According to the British Academy's profile, his research focuses on "the developmental psychopathology and neuroscience of child and adolescent mental health and disorder". In the field of ADHD he is known for introducing new concepts and theories such as the delay aversion hypothesis, the dual pathway model and the default mode interference hypothesis. Together with Michael Rutter, he led the English and Romanian Adoptee Project, which discovered how exposure to early childhood severe institutional deprivation can lead to variants of neuro-developmental conditions such as ADHD and autism that strongly persist into adulthood. In 2020, Sonuga-Barke chaired a Lancet Group Commission on "institutionalisation and deinstitutionalisation of children", which after a comprehensive review of the literature, concluded with recommendations to "prioritise the role of families in the lives of children to prevent child separation and to strengthen families, to protect children without parental care by providing high-quality family-based alternatives, and to strengthen systems for the protection and care of separated children".
