= Owen Flanagan =

American philosopher

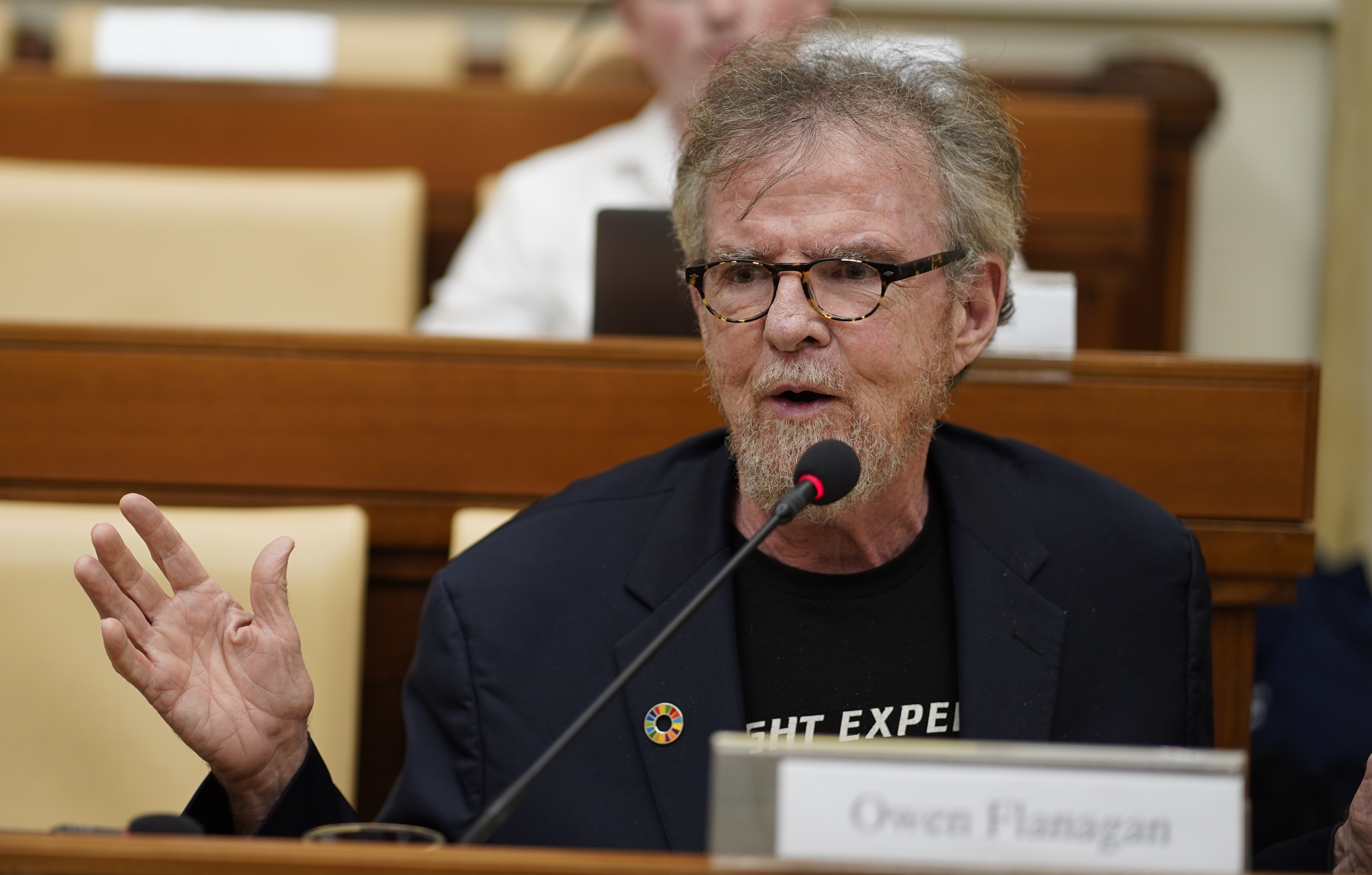
Owen Flanagan, 2019

Owen Flanagan (born 1949) is the James B. Duke University Professor Emeritus of Philosophy and Professor of Neurobiology Emeritus at Duke University. Flanagan has done work in philosophy of mind, philosophy of psychology, philosophy of social science, ethics, contemporary ethical theory, moral psychology, as well as on cross-cultural philosophy.

== Biography ==
Flanagan was born in Bronxville, New York. He grew up in Hartsdale, New York. He earned his PhD from Boston University and his Bachelor of Arts degree from Fordham University. He taught for 16 years at Wellesley College before moving to Duke in 1993.

Flanagan has written extensively on consciousness. He has been realistic about the difficulty of consciousness as a scientific and philosophical problem, but optimistic about the chance of solving the problem. One of the problems in a study of consciousness is the hidden way in which conscious states are dependent on brain states. Flanagan has proposed that there is a "natural method" to go about understanding consciousness. Three key elements of this developing science are: paying attention to subjective reports on conscious experiences, incorporating the results from psychology and cognitive science, and including the results from neuroscience that will reveal how neuronal systems produce consciousness.

Flanagan has also written extensively about ethics. Just as philosophical theorizing about consciousness must pay close attention to psychology and neuroscience, so too should ethics pay attention to the relevant sciences. His book, Varieties of Moral Personality: Ethics and Psychological Realism (1991) helped spawn several modern approaches to moral psychology by insisting on relevance of empirical psychology to the way we think of moral psychology and moral possibility.

In recent work, The Geography of Morals (Oxford University Press, 2016) and How to Do Things with Emotions: Anger and Shame Across Cultures (Princeton University Press 2021) Flanagan has brought anthropological realism to the study of cross-cultural ethics and the philosophy of emotions.

Flanagan was Rockefeller Fellow at the National Humanities Center (NHC), Research Triangle Park, NC in 2015-2016, and Berggruen Fellow at the Center for Advanced Study in the Behavioral Sciences (CASBS) in Stanford CA in 2016-2017.

Two books devoted entirely to Flanagan's work are: The Natural Method: (Eddy Nahmias, Thomas Polger, and Wenqing Zhao eds. MIT Press 2020) and Naturalism, Human Flourishing, and Asian Philosophy: Owen Flanagan and Beyond(ed. Bongrae Seok, Routledge 2020).

Flanagan works closely with Jeff Sachs at the Center for Sustainable Development at Columbia University. He was a principal in the "Ethics in Action" initiative with the Vatican (2017-2020), and he leads an ongoing initiative with Sachs and the Vatican on "Science, Ethics, Happiness, and Well-Being."

== Bibliography ==
- The Science of the Mind (MIT Press, 1984; 2nd edition, 1991)
- Identity, Character, and Morality: Essays in Moral Psychology (MIT Press, 1990)
- Varieties of Moral Personality: Ethics and Psychological Realism (Harvard University Press, 1991)
- Consciousness Reconsidered (MIT Press, 1992)
- Self Expressions: Mind, Morals, and the Meaning of Life (Oxford University Press, 1996)
- The Nature of Consciousness (MIT Press, 1998)
- Dreaming Souls: Sleep, Dreams, and the Evolution of the Conscious Mind (Oxford University, 1999)
- Narrative and Consciousness: Literature, Psychology, and the Brain (Oxford University Press, 2002)
- The Problem of the Soul: Two Visions of Mind and How to Reconcile Them (Basic 2002)
- The Really Hard Problem: Meaning in a Material World (MIT Press 2007)
- The Bodhisattva's Brain: Buddhism Naturalized (MIT Press 2011)
- The Geography of Morals (Oxford University Press, 2016)
- How to Do Things with Emotions: Anger and Shame Across Cultures (Princeton University Press 2021)
- What Is It Like to Be an Addict?: Understanding Substance Abuse (Oxford University Press 2025)
