= The Inbetweeners Movie (soundtrack) =

The Inbetweeners Movie Soundtrack

Soundtrack album by Mike Skinner and various artists
- Released: 22 August 2011
- Genre: Electronic; rock; pop
- Length: 69:35
- Label: Sony Music Entertainment
- Producer: Damon Beesley; Iain Morris

The Inbetweeners Movie Soundtrack is the soundtrack album to the 2011 film The Inbetweeners Movie based on the British television sitcom The Inbetweeners (2008–2010). It was released under the Sony Music Entertainment label on 22 August 2011 featuring 27 songs, including 10 original songs performed by Mike Skinner, other songs by Miles Kane, The Vines, Kesha, Calvin Harris, Yolanda Be Cool and dialogue snippets from the film.

== Background ==
In March 2011, it was reported that Mike Skinner of The Streets would write original music for The Inbetweeners Movie. A source close to NME, reported that "all the material he is writing for the film is new." By August, it was reported that Skinner had written 10 original songs for the film. The track list was revealed during early August, featuring 27 tracks including Skinner's songs and additional songs featured in the film, performed by Miles Kane, The Vines, Kesha, Calvin Harris, Yolanda Be Cool amongst others. The album was produced by Damon Beesley and Iain Morris, who created the television show.

== Reception ==
Jon O'Brien of AllMusic wrote "The four indie pop inclusions slightly interrupt the flow of the album, but overall, The Inbetweeners Movie OST is likely to be enjoyed by most package holiday clubbers, whether they're fans of near-the-knuckle schoolboy humor or not." Rhys Missom of WhatCulture wrote "This soundtrack works well. The structure fits along with the feel of the movie pretty effectively, and you can tell that a lot of time and effort went into thinking what artists, and songs, to include. It hasn't just been thrown together. For those of you who are massive fans of The Inbetweeners, you need to buy this. Even if you're not a fan, then it's a soundtrack that you'll find yourself listening to again and again."

== Track listing ==
No.	Title	Artist(s)	Length
1.	"Quicksand"	Miles Kane	3:20
2.	"No Problemo"	Mike Skinner	4:34
3.	"Mental Holiday" (from The Inbetweeners)	James Buckley	0:17
4.	"Gimme Love"	The Vines	1:50
5.	"Blow" (Cirkut Remix)	Kesha	4:05
6.	"Introduce Yourself" (from The Inbetweeners)	James Buckley; Blake Harrison	0:24
7.	"We No Speak Americano" (Radio Edit)	Yolanda Be Cool	2:28
8.	"Nothing But Love" (Radio Edit)	Axwell	3:30
9.	"Fernando's Theme"	Mike Skinner	3:45
10.	"You're A Virgin" (from The Inbetweeners)	Simon Bird; Laura Haddock	0:11
11.	"Twenty Euros"	Mike Skinner	3:09
12.	"Waving Not Drowning"	Mike Skinner	3:08
13.	"He Shoots He Scores" (from The Inbetweeners)	James Buckley	0:06
14.	"Clunge in a Barrel"	Mike Skinner	2:27
15.	"Twenty Miles"	Deer Tick	3:43
16.	"Feel So Close" (Benny Benassi Remix)	Calvin Harris	5:20
17.	"Smack in the Balls"	Joe Thomas	0:06
18.	"We Are Go"	Mike Skinner featuring Laura Vane	3:04
19.	"My Kz, Ur Bf" (Grum Remix)	Everything Everything	5:48
20.	"Moanatronic 5000"	Mike Skinner	3:27
21.	"Whatever It Takes"	The D.O.T.	3:13
22.	"Two Man Job" (from The Inbetweeners)	Joe Thomas	0:04
23.	"Do It"	Mike Skinner	3:36
24.	"Party All Night (Sleep All Day)" (Album Version)	Sean Kingston	3:42
25.	"Gone Up in Flames"	Morning Runner	2:53
26.	"Pussay Patrol"	Mike Sinner	1:21
27.	"To The Pussay" (from The Inbetweeners)	The Inbetweeners	0:04
Total length:			69:35

== Additional music ==
Songs not on the official soundtrack but featured in the film:

- "Pes to Mou to Nai" – Demetrios Kousathanas
- "All About Tonight" – Pixie Lott
- "Stay Too Long" – Plan B
- "Kafana na Balkanu" – Funky G
- "Stereo Love" – Edward Maya and Mia Martina
- "The Boy Who Murdered Love" – Diana Vickers

== Chart performance ==
Chart (2011)	Peak position
UK Compilation Albums (OCC)	14
UK Album Downloads (OCC)	29
UK Soundtrack Albums (OCC)	1
