= The Inbetweeners 3 =

Upcoming film directed by Damon Beesley and Iain Morris

- Directed by: Damon Beesley; Iain Morris
- Written by: Damon Beesley; Iain Morris
- Produced by: Claire Jones; Patrick Holland; Mark Lesbirel
- Starring: Simon Bird; James Buckley; Blake Harrison; Joe Thomas
- Production companies: Film4; Banijay Entertainment; Fudge Park Productions
- Distributed by: Netflix
- Country: United Kingdom

The Inbetweeners 3 is an upcoming British comedy film and sequel to The Inbetweeners Movie (2011) and The Inbetweeners 2 (2014), which were based on the E4 sitcom The Inbetweeners. The film will see original lead cast members Simon Bird, James Buckley, Blake Harrison and Joe Thomas reprise their roles, with the series' creators Damon Beesley and Iain Morris as the writers and directors. It is scheduled for a 2027 release.

== Cast ==
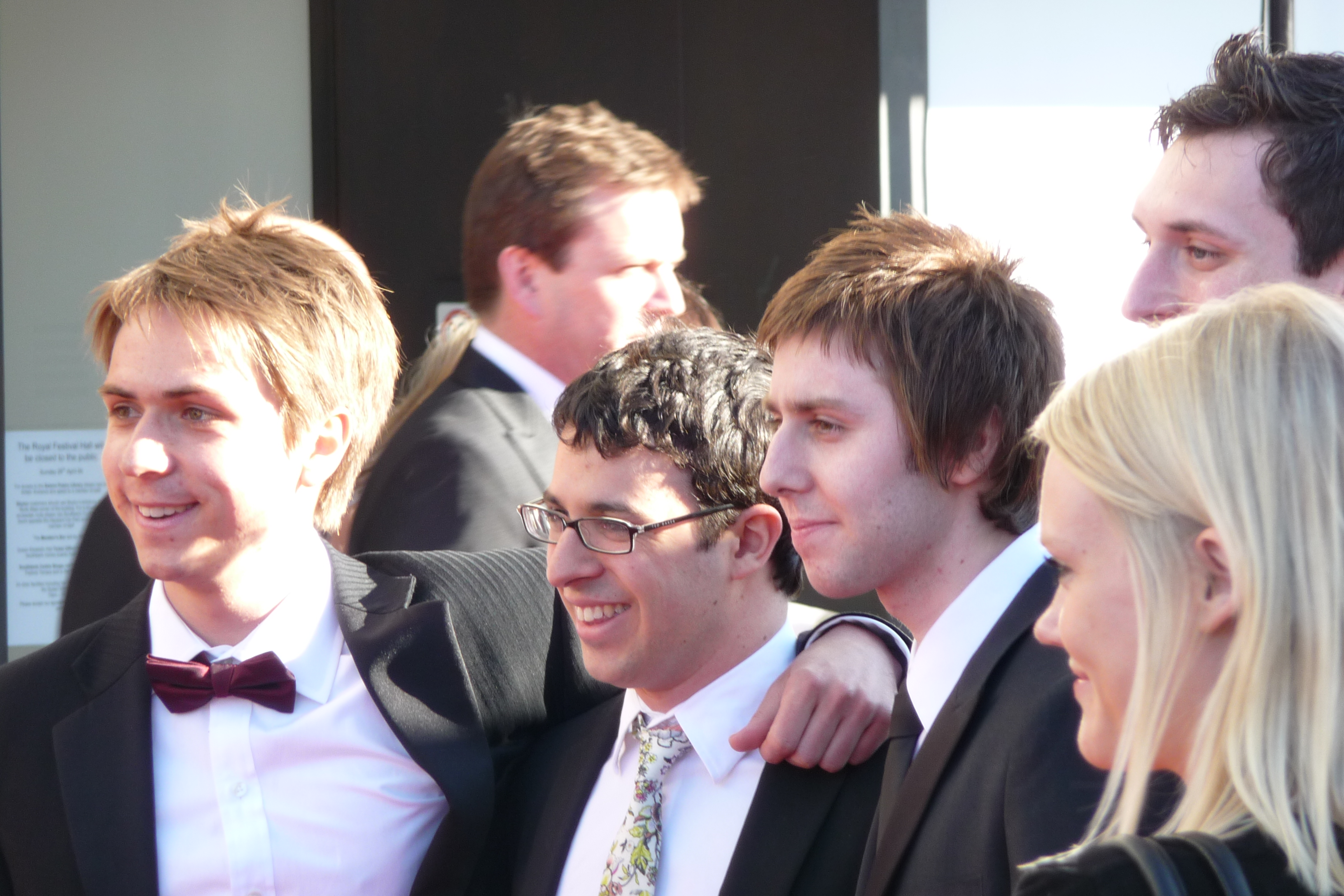
The Inbetweeners cast in 2009

- Simon Bird as Will McKenzie
- James Buckley as Jay Cartwright
- Blake Harrison as Neil Sutherland
- Joe Thomas as Simon Cooper
- Emily Head as Carli D'Amato
- Martin Trenaman as Alan Cooper
- Hannah Tointon as Tara Brown
- Ewan Mitchell as Vicar
- Marina Bye as Bride
- Hannah Cruz
- Marama Corlett
- Tadhg Murphy
- Vanessa Eng
- Laura Haddock as Alison
- Tamla Kari as Lucy

== Production ==
=== Background ===
On 12 October 2025, it was announced that an agreement had been reached between production companies Banijay and Fudge Park Productions that would "pave the way" for the return of The Inbetweeners. Ten months later, in August 2026, it was confirmed that the project would be a reunion movie produced by Netflix with all four members of the lead cast — Simon Bird (Will), James Buckley (Jay), Blake Harrison (Neil) and Joe Thomas (Simon) — returning to the franchise, alongside series creators Damon Beesley and Iain Morris.

On 7 September 2026, Netflix officially released a teaser trailer featuring the four lead actors returning to Simon's yellow Fiat Cinquecento, with the film's name aptly-confirmed to be The Inbetweeners 3. In a press release issued the same day, it was formally confirmed that production had commenced in the United Kingdom. The project will mark the first time the group has reunited since Channel 4's Fwends Reunited special hosted by Jimmy Carr in 2019. In November 2026, Buckley confirmed on his podcast that he had finished principal photography.
