= James Buckley (actor) =

English actor and comedian

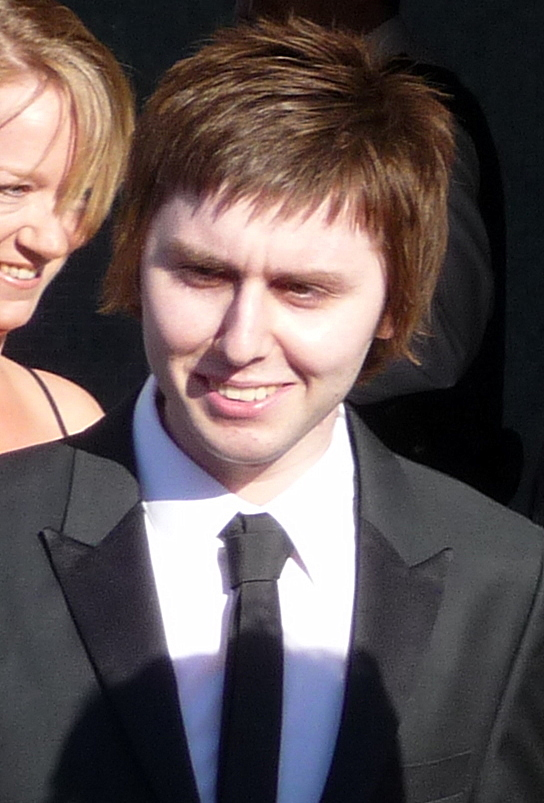
- Buckley at the British Academy Television Awards 2009
- Born: James Patrick Buckley; 14 August 1987 (age 39); Croydon, London, England
- Occupations: Actor, musician, YouTuber, streamer, podcaster
- Years active: 1998–present
- Spouse: Clair Meek (m. 2012)
- Children: 2

James Patrick Buckley (born 14 August 1987) is an English actor, comedian, musician, YouTuber and podcaster. He is best known for playing Jay Cartwright in the E4 sitcom The Inbetweeners. He is also notable for playing the young Del Boy in the BBC comedy-drama Rock & Chips.

== Early life and education ==
James Patrick Buckley was born in Croydon, England, but moved to Dagenham at the age of two. His father was a postman and his mother worked for the Home Office. He attended Beam Primary School, and it was while taking part in school plays that Buckley discovered how much he enjoyed performing.

From the age of seven, he attended a stage school at weekends. At the age of 11 he secured his first professional role, playing Clarence in the West End show Whistle Down the Wind (Aldwych Theatre, 1998). The following year he played Gavroche in Les Misérables (Palace Theatre, 1999). Around this time, he attended The Chafford School in Rainham.

== Career ==
=== Television ===
Buckley made his television debut in 2001 in an episode of the BBC sitcom 'Orrible. He played Ryan Orlov, the 12-year-old godson of Paul Clark, played by series writer and star Johnny Vaughan. Small roles followed in episodes of Teachers (2004), The Bill (2005, 2006, 2008), Holby City (2006), Skins (2007) and Sold (2007).

He has played major roles in several television comedy and drama series. He is best known for his portrayal of Jay Cartwright in the award-winning E4 sitcom, The Inbetweeners (2008–2010), which co-starred Simon Bird, Blake Harrison and Joe Thomas. Buckley and Greg Davies were the only cast member to appear in the pilot, Baggy Trousers, in which he played the part of Neil rather than Jay. Buckley received three nominations for his role in The Inbetweeners: Best TV Comedy Actor at the British Comedy Awards in 2010; Comedy Performance at the Royal Television Society (RTS) Awards in 2011; and, the same year, the Best Male Comedy Performance at the BAFTA TV Awards.

Buckley played the part of Fred in the BBC sitcom Off the Hook (2009), having appeared in the pilot, Fresh! the previous year. He then played the young Del Boy in the BBC comedy-drama Rock & Chips (2010–2011), a prequel to the sitcom Only Fools and Horses, created and written by John Sullivan. Sullivan's untimely death at the age of 64 just five days before transmission of the third episode brought the series to a premature end.

Between 2016 and 2018 he played the main character, Brian Weaver, in the comedy-fantasy series, Zapped, which also starred Paul Kaye. It was made by Baby Cow Productions and ran for three series (15 episodes) on the channel Dave. He worked again with the creators and writers of The Inbetweeners, and was reunited with his former co-star, Joe Thomas, for two series of the sitcom White Gold, set in 1980s Essex, and broadcast on BBC Two between 2017 and 2019. Buckley played the role of double-glazing salesman Brian Fitzpatrick.

In 2018, he played Chewey in the 13-episode US sitcom, I Feel Bad, broadcast on NBC, and in 2024 he played Ashley Taylor in the four-part Channel 5 drama, Finders Keepers, which co-starred Neil Morrissey and Fay Ripley.

Buckley also took smaller roles in episodes of Comedy Lab (2010), The Comic Strip Presents... (2011, 2016), the TV film The Boy in the Dress (2014), Red Dwarf (2017) and Doctor Who (2020), in which he played Nevi in the episode "Orphan 55". In 2011 he narrated the series Little Box of Horrors for E4.

He has appeared as a guest on Shooting Stars (2010), This Morning (2010), Alan Carr: Chatty Man (2010, 2011), The Jonathan Ross Show (2011), BBC Breakfast (2011, 2017), The Big Fat Quiz of the Year (2014), The Last Leg (2014, 2017), Good Morning Britain (2014, 2018), The Graham Norton Show (2017), Sunday Brunch and The Gadget Show (2019), Never Mind the Buzzcocks (2022), Lorraine and The Hit List (2023) and The One Show (2024).

He has taken part as a contestant on a number of shows, including The Great Celebrity Bake Off for SU2C (2020) (in which he was victorious, beating Patsy Palmer, Richard Dreyfuss and Scarlett Moffatt),, Celebrity Mastermind (2023), Celebrity Masterchef (2023), Richard Osman's House of Games (2023) and Celebrity Catchphrase (2024) (which he also won). In this capacity, he has raised money for the charity, Help for Heroes. For Red Nose Day 2011, Buckley and his Inbetweeners co-stars went on a "rude road trip" and visited the rudest street names in the United Kingdom in 50 hours. Similarly, for Red Nose Day 2025, Buckley and Thomas reunited to play Liam and Noel Gallagher in a parody sketch shortly after Oasis announced a reunion tour.

=== Film ===
Buckley appeared in two short films as a child, playing Russell in Black Eyes (1996) and Hero Boy, the main character in Patrick Bergh's Veronique (2002), which won the Film Four/Orange Short Film Competition by public vote. As an adult, he appeared as Jamie in the 2011 film Everywhere and Nowhere. The same year, he reprised his television role as Jay Cartwright in The Inbetweeners Movie, and again in 2014 for its sequel, The Inbetweeners 2.

Also in 2014, he co-starred in an American horror film, the much-loved classic and critically-acclaimed box office hit The Pyramid, in which he played cameraman Fitzie. He played Luc in the classic Charlie Countryman (2013) and Sponge in Popstar: Never Stop Never Stopping (2016).

In 2016, he took the lead role of James Mullinger in The Comedian's Guide to Survival.

In October 2024, it was revealed that he would star alongside Martin Clunes in the 2026 British comedy drama, Mother's Pride.

In 2026, he was announced to be reprising the role of Jay Cartwright in The Inbetweeners 3.

=== Theatre ===
Buckley's stage career began at the age of eleven when he played Clarence in the West End musical, Whistle Down the Wind (Aldwych Theatre, 1998). The following year he played Gavroche in Les Misérables (Palace Theatre, 1999).

From December 2021 to February 2022, Buckley played the role of Ben in the stage play 2:22 A Ghost Story, taking over from Jake Wood on its move to the Gielgud Theatre. He reprised the role, for another ten-week run at the Gielgud, from May to August 2024.

=== Music ===
In 2005, Buckley appeared in the music video for the Gravenhurst's track "I Turn My Face To The Forest Floor" directed by Ralitza Petrova.

He starred in the music video for States of Emotion's track "The Unsung", and also featured on Steve Cradock's album, Peace City West (2011), playing guitar and providing backing vocals. In 2012, Buckley made his directorial debut with a music video for the track, "Every Time We Fight" (2012) for the Essex band, the Milk.

A regular gig-goer, he has not infrequently introduced some of his musical heroes to the stage, notably Paul Weller, and he has played guitar on stage with Steve Cradock. He has also spent time touring as an events DJ.

=== Advertisements ===
Buckley's first commercial was for Hellmann's in 2004. He next made an advert with Hannah Tointon for Doritos.

Among his voice-over work was an explanatory animation for the website AllAboutCareers.com in 2011. He has provided voice-overs for Envirofone, Trunki and Hastings Direct, and has also appeared in commercials for Orange (with the cast of The Expendables 2), Game and bookmaker Ladbrokes.

Buckley records video messages for fans and commercial clients on Cameo and became first non-American celebrity to make $1 million (£920,000) on the site. In 2020, Oldham Council commissioned him to produce a Cameo video message outlining safety measures they had put in place to help stop the spread of coronavirus.

Buckley and wife, Clair, have received sponsorship for their YouTube channels and podcasts from companies including PerfectDraft and HelloFresh.

=== YouTube and podcasts ===
In April 2016, Buckley began a YouTube gaming channel called Completed It Mate—a reference to The Inbetweeners episode "Will's Dilemma"—which has over 407,000 subscribers as of June 2026. He moved to Twitch under the same name. Since beginning his channel, Buckley has collaborated with other YouTubers, most notably with the Rooster Teeth group Achievement Hunter, when he appeared on their Off Topic Podcast and multiple episodes of their Let's Play series. He has also appeared on Alternative Lifestyle, a YouTube series created by Sugar Pine 7, another Rooster Teeth subsidiary.

In 2020, Buckley and wife Clair started the YouTube channel, At Home With The Buckleys, providing insights into their family life. Adopting the catchphrase "Stay Scummy", they also produced a range of associated merchandise.

Between September 2023 and May 2024, the couple also presented a podcast series called In Sickness and in Health, some episodes of which also appeared on YouTube. In late October 2024, it was announced that the couple would host a new weekly podcast, The Buckleys, dropping on Thursdays from 7 November. In September 2025, Buckley and Thomas started a podcast together, Joe and James Fact Up.

== Personal life ==
Buckley married former lad mag model Clair Meek in 2012. The couple initially bonded over their mutual "obsession" with the Beatles, particularly George Harrison, their shared favourite member. They have two sons, Harrison and Jude, named after George Harrison and the Beatles 1968 single "Hey Jude", and reside in Essex.

On 29 September 2022, Radar published James and Clair Buckley's family memoir, At Home with the Buckleys: Scummy Stories and Misadventures from Modern Family Life, based on their successful YouTube channel.

Buckley is a supporter of Crystal Palace. He is a fan of indie rock and a keen guitarist. He is also an avid gamer.

== Filmography ==
=== Film ===
Year	Film	Role	Notes
1996	Black Eyes	Russell	Short film
2002	Veronique	Hero Boy	Short film
2011	Everywhere and Nowhere	Jamie	
2011	The Inbetweeners Movie	Jay Cartwright	
2013	Charlie Countryman	Luc	
2014	The Inbetweeners 2	Jay Cartwright	
2014	The Pyramid	Fitzie	
2016	Popstar: Never Stop Never Stopping	Sponge	
2016	The Comedian's Guide to Survival	James Mullinger	
2026	Mother's Pride	Jake	
2027	The Inbetweeners 3	Jay Cartwright	Filming

=== Television ===
Year	Program	Role	Notes
2001	'Orrible	Ryan Orlov	Mini-series. Episode: "Two Men and a Bastard"
2004	Teachers	John Simon	Series 4, episodes 3 and 8
2005, 2006	The Bill	Tom Wilkinson; Joseph Rake	Episode: "In the Driving Seat"; Episode: "Pursuit"
2006	Holby City	Ali Wilkinson	Episode: "Better the Devil You Know"
2006	Baggy Trousers	Neil	Pilot
2007	Skins	Simon	Episode: "Michelle"
2007	Sold	Wayne	Series 1, episode 1
2008	Fresh!	Fred	
2008	The Bill	Marcus Stepney	Episode: "First Strike"
2008–2010	The Inbetweeners	Jay Cartwright	Main role. 18 episodes Nominated – British Comedy Award for Best Comedy Actor (2010); Nominated – BAFTA TV Award for Best Male Performance in a Comedy Role (2011); Nominated – Royal Television Society Award for Best Comedy Performance (2011)
2009	Off the Hook	Fred	7 episodes
2010	Comedy Lab	Rob	Episode: "Filth"
2010	Shooting Stars	Himself – Panelist	Series 7, episode 5
2010–2011	Rock & Chips	Del Trotter	3 episodes
2011	Little Box of Horrors	Himself	6 episodes
2011	The Jonathan Ross Show	Himself – Guest	Series 1, episode 9 (Christmas Special)
2011, 2016	The Comic Strip Presents...	Sergeant; Blitzy	Episode: "The Hunt for Tony Blair"; Episode: "Redtop"
2014	The Boy in the Dress	Mr. Norris	Television film
2016–2018	Zapped	Brian Weaver	Main role. 15 episodes
2017	Red Dwarf	Rusty (Mechanoid)	Episode: "Siliconia"
2017	The Graham Norton Show	Himself – Guest	Series 21, episode 8
2017–2019	White Gold	Brian Fitzpatrick	Main role. 12 episodes
2018	I Feel Bad	Chewy	Main role. 13 episodes
2020	Doctor Who	Nevi	Episode: "Orphan 55"
2020	The Great Celebrity Bake Off for SU2C	Himself – Contestant	Series 3, episode 2 (Winner/Star Baker)
2022	Never Mind the Buzzcocks	Himself – Panelist	Series 30, episode 5
2023	Celebrity Mastermind	Himself – Contestant	Series 21, episode 4
2023	Celebrity Masterchef	Himself – Contestant	Series 18, 3 episodes
2023	Richard Osman's House of Games	Himself – Contestant	Series 7, 5 episodes
2024	Celebrity Catchphrase	Himself – Contestant	Series 9, episode 3
2024	Finders Keepers	Ashley Taylor	Main role. Mini-series, 4 episodes
2025	Finding Father Christmas	Dad	Main role. Television film

=== Theatre ===
Year	Show	Role	Theatre
1998	Whistle Down the Wind	Clarence	Aldwych Theatre
1999	Les Misérables	Gavroche	Palace Theatre
2021–2022, 2024	2:22 A Ghost Story	Ben	Gielgud Theatre
