= The Inbetweeners 2 =

2014 film directed by Damon Beesley and Iain Morris

- Theatrical release poster
- Directed by: Damon Beesley; Iain Morris
- Written by: Damon Beesley; Iain Morris
- Produced by: Spencer Millman
- Starring: Simon Bird; James Buckley; Blake Harrison; Joe Thomas
- Narrated by: Simon Bird
- Cinematography: Ben Wheeler
- Edited by: William Webb
- Music by: David Arnold; Michael Price
- Production companies: Film4; Zodiak Media; Bwark Productions
- Distributed by: Entertainment Film Distributors (United Kingdom); Roadshow Films (Australia and New Zealand)
- Release date: 6 August 2014
- Running time: 96 minutes
- Countries: United Kingdom; Australia
- Language: English
- Box office: $63.8 million

The Inbetweeners 2 is a 2014 teen coming of age adventure sex comedy film and sequel to The Inbetweeners Movie (2011), which is based on the E4 sitcom The Inbetweeners (2008–2010). It was written and directed by series creators Damon Beesley and Iain Morris. Simon Bird, Joe Thomas, James Buckley and Blake Harrison, all return to reprise their roles. The film sees Will, Simon, Jay, and Neil, all meet up again for a holiday in Australia.

The Inbetweeners 2 was released on 6 August 2014 in the United Kingdom and Ireland, to positive reception from critics. It surpassed the record of its predecessor for the highest gross on the opening day of a comedy in the UK, with £2.75 million, and ended its first weekend with a gross of £12.5 million, the largest opening of any film in 2014, then remained on top for a second week. With an overall gross of £33.3 million, it was the highest-grossing British film in the domestic market in 2014. On 21 August, it was released in Australia, to a mixed reception, and topped the box office in its opening weekend.

The film was originally intended to be the last instalment in the franchise. However, in September 2026, Netflix announced that production on a sequel had commenced, which is set for a 2027 release.

== Plot ==
It is the lead up to the Easter holidays, and Will, Neil and Jay's respective relationships with Alison, Lisa and Jane of the first film have ended.

Will is studying at university in Bristol while Simon is studying in Sheffield. Will is ostracised by his peers at university, while Simon is with his girlfriend Lucy and friend Pete. Neil works in a bank and Jay is taking a gap year in Australia.

Simon is unhappy with his relationship with Lucy, who has become obsessive and abusive. During the film, Lucy sends various videos to Simon of her destroying his treasured belongings, such as cutting up his hoodies, burning his trainers and microwaving his PlayStation.

While Neil and Simon visit Will at the University of Bristol, Jay emails them, claiming that he is a DJ at a popular nightclub in Sydney and lives in a mansion. The trio decide to go to Australia to visit Jay.

Upon arrival in Sydney, they discover that Jay works as a nightclub toilet attendant and lives in a tent at his uncle Bryan's house. At the nightclub, Will is reunited with Katie, a girl he studied with in private school, who is backpacking. At her request, Will agrees to join her at Byron Bay. At Bryan's house, Simon attempts to break up with Lucy over Skype, but Bryan tricks her into thinking Simon is proposing and Lucy agrees to marry him.

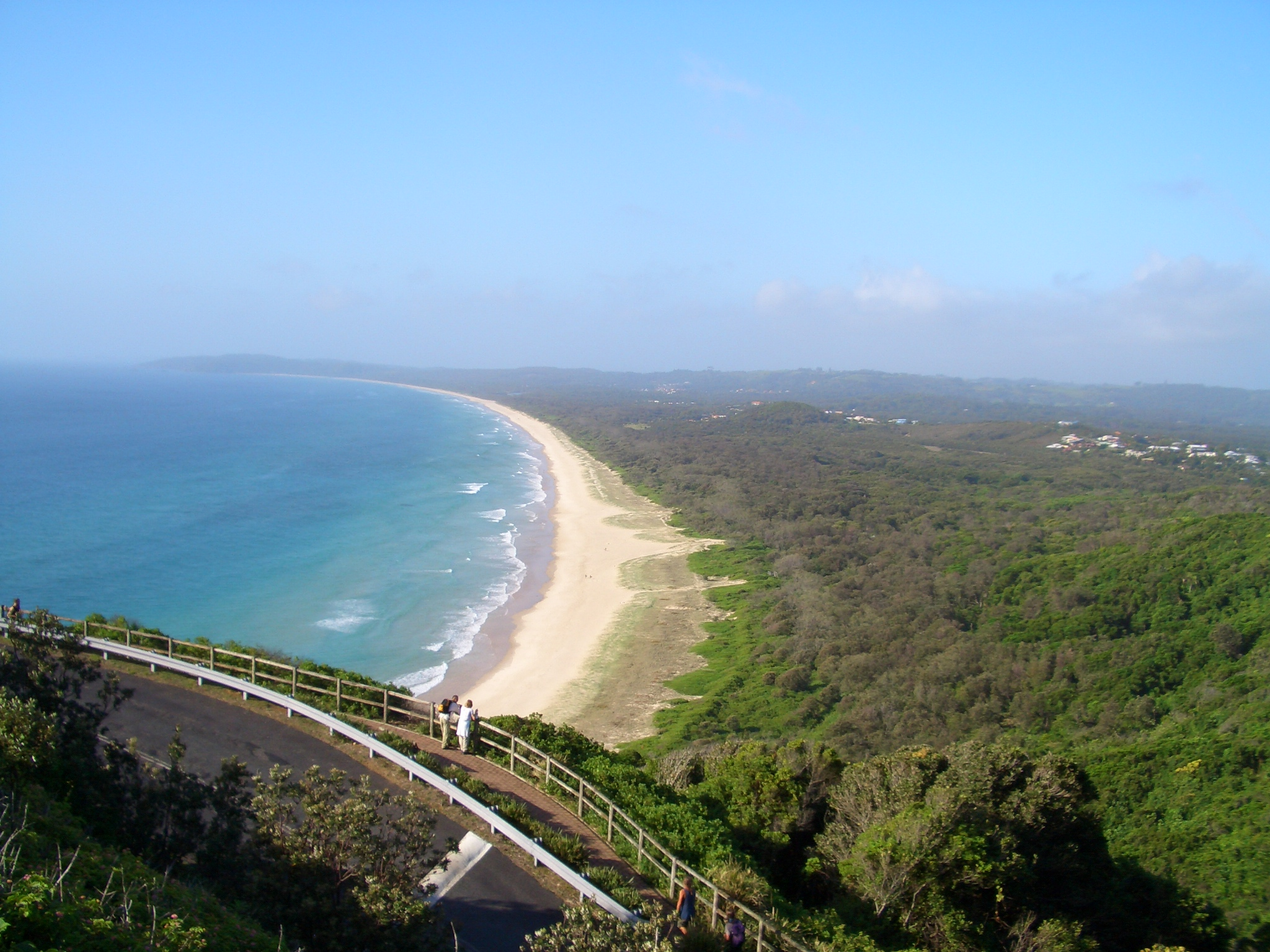
Byron Bay

The boys meet Katie who is with a group of backpackers. While Will tries to fit in with the backpackers, they mock him upon realising that he is a holidaymaker rather than a traveller. They travel to a youth hostel in Byron Bay and Will sings a cover of "The First Time Ever I Saw Your Face" to Katie, who seduces him at the hostel. Before they can have sex, Katie passes out, shortly before a backpacker enters and attacks Will for thinking that he is engaging in rape, setting off Will's own rape alarm in the process.

The next day, the boys join the backpackers at Splash Planet, a water park. Jay believes that his ex-girlfriend Jane works there. Neil accidentally kills a dolphin by feeding it fast food, and Simon is attacked by some fathers after they mistake him for a paedophile. A worker tells Jay that Jane has left Splash Planet and is working in the outback. As Will uses a waterslide, Neil soils himself due to IBS symptoms and his faeces follow Will down the slide. Will is hit in the face by the faeces, causing him to vomit uncontrollably and the pool to be evacuated.

The boys leave Splash Planet, and Jay opens up about having travelled to Australia to reconnect with Jane. Lucy tells Simon over Skype that Jane works at a horse farm in Birdsville. The boys prepare to drive there, but Will, angry and dejected over the Splash Planet incident and towards his friends' treatment of him, stays in Byron Bay in the hopes of starting a relationship with Katie and becoming a traveller. Will struggles to fit in with the "spiritual" activities of the travellers and discovers that Katie is having sex with multiple people at once. He rebukes the group and flies to Birdsville, reconciling with the boys.

In the desert, Jay's car runs out of fuel and the boys try to get help, to no avail. Believing that they will die, they are rescued by Jane and her colleagues. Jane is touched by Jay's efforts to win her over again, but does not take him back.

At Bryan's house in Sydney, the boys discover that Jay's father and Will's mother have flown out to meet them. To Will's dismay, his old head of sixth form, Mr Gilbert, is now in a relationship with Will's mother. Over Skype, Lucy breaks up with Simon after revealing that she has been having sex with Pete to Simon's relief. The boys drive off to continue travelling in Australia.

They later travel from Australia to Vietnam, and then spend time in Thailand and Cambodia. Upon their return to the United Kingdom months later, Neil is in a relationship with an older female traveller from Byron Bay, while Will's mother announces her engagement to Mr Gilbert.

== Cast ==
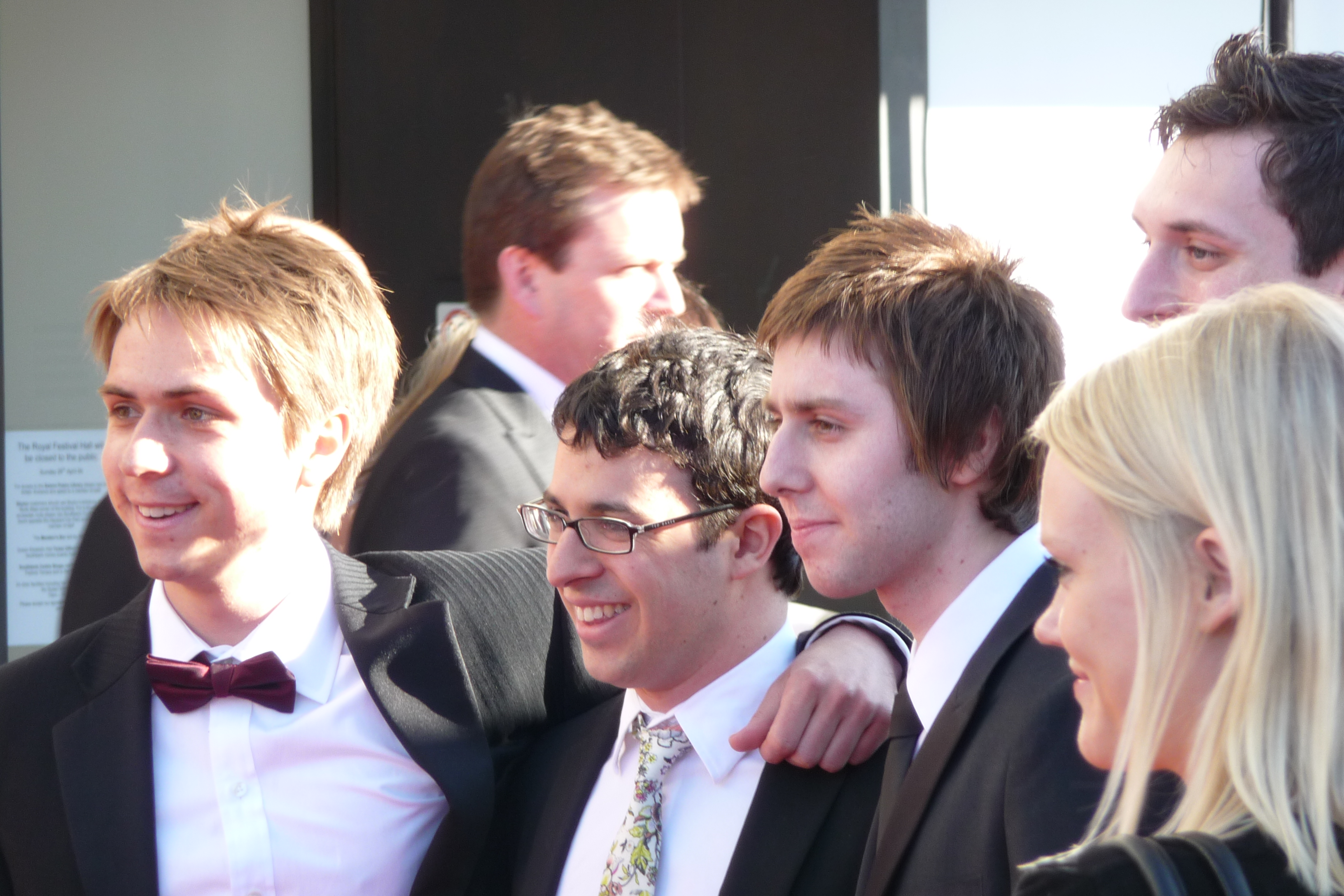
From left to right: Joe Thomas, Simon Bird, James Buckley and Blake Harrison

- Simon Bird as Will McKenzie
- James Buckley as Jay Cartwright
- Blake Harrison as Neil Sutherland
- Joe Thomas as Simon Cooper
- Emily Berrington as Katie Evans
- Belinda Stewart-Wilson as Polly McKenzie
- Tamla Kari as Lucy
- Freddie Stroma as Ben Thornton-Wild
- Lydia Rose Bewley as Jane
- David Schaal as Terry Cartwright
- Alex Macqueen as Kevin Sutherland
- Martin Trenaman as Alan Cooper
- Robin Weaver as Pamela Cooper
- Greg Davies as Mr Gilbert
- Adam Nagaitis as Pete
- Oliver Johnstone as Kristian
- Susan Wokoma as Della
- Steve Brody as Bristol pub landlord
- Brad Kannegiesser as Jasper
- David Field as Uncle Bryan

Daisy Ridley originally featured in the opening scene but was unavailable for reshoots as she was busy filming Star Wars: The Force Awakens so was cut from the final version of the film.

== Production ==
=== Origin ===
Although originally intended as an unambiguous ending to the television series, the unexpected popularity and box office success of The Inbetweeners Movie led to speculation over the possibility of a sequel. These rumours began in early September 2011, while the film was still in cinemas, and were denied by its writers and actors. Around the same time, producer Christopher Young openly recognised the possibility of another film based on the series, claiming that "if there is a sequel it will come from the creative elements ... We've talked about it. In the short term people are dispersing and doing other things but I'm sure in the medium term a sequel is very possible. It won't be immediate but it's definitely not closed." Co-writer Damon Beesley later admitted "we didn't know how successful it would be and that it would have a life on screen. But they did translate to big-screen characters, people did care about them and did go back and see it more than once – and that's very rare in cinema. The idea of not following that up seemed insane to most people". The actors had mixed emotions on making a sequel. Although Buckley and Thomas felt put off by the success of the first film, Harrison and Bird became convinced on reading the script.

Simon Bird, James Buckley, Blake Harrison and Joe Thomas co-produced the film with Spencer Millman but Damon Beesley and Iain Morris awarded a sole producer credit to Millman; Bird, Buckley, Harrison and Thomas are instead listed as uncredited producers in the film final cut.

Iain Morris received inspiration for the film from his own experiences as a high school exchange student on Australia's Gold Coast, describing it as "a place where people go to get drunk, pick some fruit and get drunk again".

=== Development ===
On 21 August 2012, it was announced that a sequel was in early stages of pre-production. On 8 November, it was announced by series creators Morris and Beesley that a script was being written and it was at "version 0.5"

On 2 August 2013, the sequel was officially confirmed for release in August 2014. The series' Facebook page revealed on 15 March 2014 that the sequel would be released on 6 August 2014.

On 9 May 2014, a teaser trailer was released, in which the characters drive through the Outback and call an Australian Aboriginal person a "fire wanker". A second trailer, this time full length, was released on The Inbetweeners official Facebook page on 18 June, showing more of the storyline.

=== Filming ===
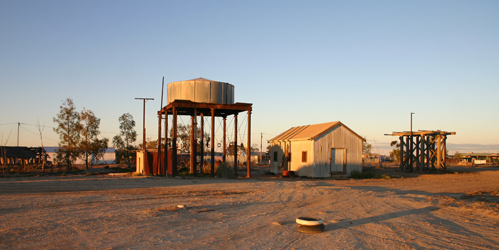
Parts of the film were shot in the isolated Outback settlement of Marree, South Australia

Filming began in Australia on 7 December 2013, before moving to the UK in January 2014. Part of the film was shot in Marree, South Australia, an isolated Outback settlement without mobile reception or Internet.

Ben Palmer, the director of the first Inbetweeners film, was involved with Simon Pegg's film Man Up, so Morris and Beesley directed The Inbetweeners 2. Bird said that the actors were initially disheartened by the absence of Palmer, and nervous about the direction of Morris and Beesley due to their lack of experience in the position.

Morris had considered filming the Australian scenes in South Africa due to the comparatively high costs in Australia, which despite a higher budget caused the sequel to have fewer resources than its predecessor. While all locations for the first film had been within 10 minutes of the hotel, locations in the second were separated by a three-hour flight and nine-hour car journey. During filming in the Outback, the Australian crew provided two doctors and 40 litres of IV fluid, although the only point in which a doctor was called was when Buckley thought that he was having a heart attack, which was in reality indigestion from chips and lager. Beesley considered it "the maniac's choice of a film to be your first film". The water park scenes were filmed at Wet'n'Wild Gold Coast, which Thomas described as "some quite challenging scenes".

When asked whether he ever felt averse to any material in the film due to perceived offence, Morris said that the crew's attitude was "let’s shoot everything, push it, and then if it feels like too much when we’re watching it, we can always pull it back in the editing room".

== Release ==
The film premiered at Leicester Square, London, on 5 August 2014. In Australia it was distributed by Roadshow Entertainment and released on 21 August. The same company took the film to New Zealand a week later.

=== Box office ===
The Inbetweeners 2 grossed £2.75 million on its opening day of 6 August 2014, surpassing its predecessor as the top grossing opening day in the UK for a comedy film. By the end of its first weekend, it topped the UK box office with a gross of £12.5 million, surpassing Transformers: Age of Extinction (£11.7 million) as the largest UK opening in 2014; this, however, was less than the £13.2 million opening of The Inbetweeners Movie in 2011. It topped the box office for a second week, in which it grossed £9.83 million. In its third week, it fell to second spot behind new release Lucy.

In its opening week in Australia, the film grossed $3.155 million in Australian dollars, topping the box office and pushing Guardians of the Galaxy into second place. It fell to second place in its second week, with Guardians of the Galaxy returning to top spot.

As of 12 October 2014, the film had made $55,652,783 in the United Kingdom, $6,598,273 in Australia, and $473,316 in New Zealand.

With an overall gross of £33.3 million, The Inbetweeners 2 was the highest grossing British or Irish film in the domestic market in 2014, ahead of Paddington (£27.9 million). It was the third highest grossing of any film in the UK and Ireland in 2014, after The Lego Movie and The Hobbit: The Battle of the Five Armies.

=== Critical reception ===
On review aggregator Rotten Tomatoes, the film has an approval rating of 69% based on 42 reviews - with an average critic rating of 5.9/10. The site's consensus reads: "The hapless Inbetweeners reunite for another raunchy adventure that will satisfy fans' appetite for laughs, but a downturn in plausibility along with an uptick in mean-spiritedness makes for less fun than their previous exploits." On Metacritic, the film has a 55/100 rating based on 7 critics, indicating "mixed or average reviews".

==== United Kingdom ====
Robbie Collin of The Daily Telegraph gave the film four stars out of five, saying "Perhaps the biggest compliment you could pay the film, apart from that it's by and large hysterically funny, is that it is unmistakably film-like, with a smoothly arcing plot and gross-out moments staged with the verve and ceremony of an action-movie set-piece." In The Guardian, Mike McCahill gave the film three stars. He found fault in its treatment of female characters, saying "Some of the abundant thought channelled into knob gags could have been diverted towards developing the boys' female counterparts beyond harpies and lust objects". Unlike Collin, he found The Inbetweeners 2 to resemble a television show more than a film: "as with the first film, number 2 never quite shakes its resemblance to primetime E4, complete with ad-ready fadeouts and Walkabout interiors...couldn't the vehicles transporting them to the wider world display slightly more ambition?". Chris Hewitt of Empire magazine gave the film four stars out of five, summing it up as "The Fannytastic Four leave us on a poo-flecked, piss-soaked, sun-burned high that more than overcomes its familiar flaws to become a real contender for the year's funniest film. Four star wankers".

A negative review came from Graham Young of the Birmingham Mail, who found the film's humour to be repetitive: "Damon Beesley and Iain Morris have both directed this sequel which lacks an emotional arc to create momentum...Yes, it can be funny, and you’d have to be a prude not to laugh...But the endless, alliterative phrases for sex and countless in-your-face sight gags dilute the characters and turn the mood wearingly lewd. Like Nick Frost's The Cuban Fury [sic] earlier this year, The Inbetweeners 2 takes a funny premise – and then ruins it." Writing in The Observer, Jonathan Romney gave the film two stars out of five, summing it up as "British TV comedy's favourite Four Stooges take another holiday, resulting in fountainous poo, pee and puke, rampant misogyny, 'ironic' rampant misogyny, rampant 'irony', and that old Carry On staple, horror of sex (especially among the over-25s)". He however predicted that on the record of the first film, The Inbetweeners 2 would be a financial success. In Time Out, Tom Huddleston gave the film one star out of five, saying "‘The Inbetweeners 2’ is riddled with contempt: for its characters, for its audience and most notably for the entire female gender. That a film in 2014 can still get away with depicting all women as either dumb, hapless sluts or ball-busting harridans is frankly unbelievable."

==== Australia ====
In Australia, Matthew Toomey, a film critic for 612 ABC Brisbane, gave The Inbetweeners 2 a B+. He said "Don’t expect a deep, underlying narrative. This is just a bunch of horny teenagers doing really dumb things. To each their own... but I was entertained. First and foremost, it shocked me – and that’s not easy given how many movies I watch. It pushes the envelope a lot further than I expected and I'd highly recommend seeing the film in a packed cinema. The audience reactions would be hilarious." Louise Keller of Urban Cinefile wrote a mixed review, stating that the film takes a long time to "get going" due to a "silly establishment skit". However, she concluded that "there is genuine affection with which the filmmakers portray their characters and as a consequence, the level of offence is lessened to some degree".

In the Herald Sun, Leigh Paatsch gave the film one star. He criticised the casting, describing the main characters as "supposed to be aged about 20 [but] played by blokes who all look as if they're 30-plus, and carry on as if they’re not yet 10", and also found the film misogynistic, saying "the derogatory manner in which women are spoken of (and often depicted) is relentlessly, callously crass. Sometimes even hateful". A mixed review from Philippa Hawker of the Sydney Morning Herald concluded "The Australian elements seem hastily inserted and incidental: the movie could have been set in any country that had a water park and a place to get lost. But as a hymn to male bonding, and an exploration of the comic possibilities of what happens when a turd hits a water slide, The Inbetweeners 2 is a precisely crafted, assured piece of work".

=== Home media ===
The Inbetweeners 2 was released on DVD and Blu-ray in the United Kingdom on 1 December 2014. A DVD edition also including the first film was released at the same time.

The DVD featured two audio commentaries, one with Morris and Beesley and the other by the four lead actors, in addition to a behind-the-scenes featurette, deleted scenes, and a blooper reel. The film's release on home media was sponsored by STA Travel, who offered a prize of a holiday to the Australian state of Queensland.

== Legacy and sequel ==
At its premiere on 5 August 2014, Bird said of the film:

Once you see the film you'll see it feels like they've all moved on with their lives, so unfortunately this is it. It's a great way to say goodbye.

In an interview with the BBC, Thomas said that Morris and Beesley had been "very adamant" that the series had finished. On his co-stars, he added "There is a bond there that I think would be a stupid thing to waste. You don't get that bond very often with other performers and we do have it and it's a valuable thing".

In the same interview, when asked whether the series had finished, both co-creators answered with a simultaneous "Yes!". Morris expressed that "I think the time is right. After the first film, I wanted to hear more from Jay, Will, Neil and Simon. But this time I feel there is enough. There is more than enough Jay in this world", and Beesley added "The end of the story has always felt like the time where they go off and start living their adult life. And I think this film takes us up to that point".

Various media outlets blamed The Inbetweeners 2 for an increase in a craze of deliberate defecation in swimming pools to distress other guests. They linked the craze, known as "logging" or "Code Brown", to a scene akin to it in the film.

Despite the cast and crew's previous statements, a second sequel, titled The Inbetweeners 3, was announced by Netflix on 7 September 2026, with production beginning in the UK on the same day. Beesley and Morris returned to write and direct the film, with original cast members Simon Bird, James Buckley, Blake Harrison, and Joe Thomas reprising their roles. The film is scheduled for a 2027 release.

== See also ==
- List of 2014 box office number-one films in the United Kingdom
- List of 2014 box office number-one films in Australia
