= Charlie Countryman =

- Theatrical release poster
- Directed by: Fredrik Bond
- Written by: Matt Drake
- Produced by: Albert Berger; Ron Yerxa; Craig J. Flores; William Horberg
- Starring: Shia LaBeouf; Evan Rachel Wood; Mads Mikkelsen; Rupert Grint; James Buckley; Vincent D'Onofrio; Melissa Leo
- Cinematography: Roman Vasyanov
- Edited by: Hughes Winborne
- Music by: Christophe Beck; Deadmono
- Production companies: Voltage Pictures; Picture Perfect Corporation; Bona Fide Production
- Distributed by: Millennium Entertainment
- Release dates: January 21, 2013 (Sundance); November 15, 2013 (United States)
- Running time: 103 minutes
- Countries: United States; Romania
- Languages: English; Romanian
- Box office: $424,404

Charlie Countryman (originally titled The Necessary Death of Charlie Countryman as well as Kill Charlie Countryman) is a 2013 romantic drama film directed by Fredrik Bond in his directorial debut, written by Matt Drake, and starring Shia LaBeouf, Evan Rachel Wood and Mads Mikkelsen.

The film premiered on January 21, 2013 at the 2013 Sundance Film Festival and was screened in competition at the 63rd Berlin International Film Festival. The film was released November 15, 2013 in the United States was released on October 31, 2014 in the United Kingdom.

== Plot ==
Chicago native Charlie Countryman is greeted in a hospital by his deceased mother after she is taken off life support. She requests him to go to Bucharest, Romania, and he complies despite his initial reservations. During his flight he bonds with Victor, a Romanian man who is returning home after attending a Chicago Cubs game. Hours later, Victor dies in his sleep; his spirit asks Charlie to deliver a gift and final message to his daughter, Gabi.

At the airport, Charlie meets Gabi and is immediately smitten by her. He consoles her before they part ways, only to cross paths again in the city when Charlie is traveling by taxi and sees her in her parked car, distressed. After he offers to help her catch up to the ambulance transporting her father's body, they nearly collide with the van, and it crashes. Gabi then accompanies her father's corpse in a different ambulance, leaving her car with Charlie, who finds a revolver in her purse with an inscription from "Nigel."

He drives to the Romanian Athenaeum, where Gabi performs as a cellist, and she calls him with instructions to deliver her instrument to the conductor, Bela. Following an orchestral performance, Gabi is confronted by her estranged husband, Nigel, who meets Charlie and expresses resentment towards him. After arriving at a hostel, Charlie parties with his British roommates Karl and Luc at night after they dose him with ecstasy and is unexpectedly menaced by Nigel in the bathroom. Spotting Gabi out and about, Charlie insists on accompanying her, and they spend time together, sharing memories of their parents. Before Gabi departs, she promises to kiss him if he can find her the next day.

After Karl takes an overdose of Viagra, Charlie and Luc bring him to a strip club. They receive a bill for 9,900 Romanian leu ($2379.81) and are threatened by the manager, Darko, who catches Charlie eyeing photos of Gabi and Nigel on his wall. Despite initially demanding to know Nigel's whereabouts, Darko lets them go. Charlie then waits for Gabi at the Athenaeum until Bela drives him to her home as a memorial is being held for Victor. Charlie and Gabi share the kiss she promised him, and he tells her he met Darko. Nigel barges in and threatens Charlie, but Gabi forces him to leave at gunpoint. Once they are alone, she explains to Charlie how she met Nigel, realizing he was a violent criminal after they married, and that her father forced Nigel to leave Bucharest with the threat of an incriminating videotape that Darko wants to obtain. Charlie confesses he is in love with her, and they have sex.

Waking up alone, Charlie finds a tape in Victor's VHS collection labeled "Cubs Win World Series - 1995," revealed to be security footage of Nigel and Darko murdering a group of people. A shocked Charlie finds Gabi at a café with Nigel and impulsively reveals he watched the tape. Nigel nearly kills him and escapes before the police arrive, while Charlie is taken into custody. Bela arranges to have Charlie sent to Budapest, bluntly stating that Gabi doesn't want to see him. Charlie is dropped off at the hostel to collect his belongings, but the owner warns him that men are waiting for him. Pursued by Darko's henchmen, Charlie escapes to Gabi's house only to find the tape missing. He is confronted by Darko, who has kidnapped and interrogated Karl and Luc. Gabi calls Darko to arrange a meeting, and he knocks Charlie unconscious.

Gabi finds Charlie outside the Athenaeum and tells him that he will never see her again. With the tape in her possession, she prepares to leave with Nigel to meet Darko. Encouraged by another vision of his mother, Charlie tries to stop Nigel but is knocked out again. He is taken to a wharf and hung by his ankle above the water, while Nigel burns the tape. Nigel forces Gabi to shoot Charlie, but she spares him as the police arrive. Darko and his men flee, dropping Charlie into the water, while Nigel realizes Gabi loves Charlie and commits suicide by cop. Charlie emerges from the water alive and reunites with Gabi.

== Cast ==
- Shia LaBeouf as Charlie Countryman
- Evan Rachel Wood as Gabriella "Gabi" Ibanescu
- Mads Mikkelsen as Nigel
- Til Schweiger as Darko
- Rupert Grint as Karl
- James Buckley as Luc
- Ion Caramitru as Victor Ibanescu
- Vincent D'Onofrio as Bill
- Melissa Leo as Kate Countryman
- Andrei Finti as Bela
- Gabriel Spahiu as Taxi Driver
- Aubrey Plaza as Ashley
- Vanessa Kirby as Felicity
- Lia Sinchevici as Waitress
- Ian Fisher

John Hurt was a brief narrator for the film's original version released at Sundance, but his narration was edited out and is included on its Blu-ray release as an extra.

== Production ==
In early development, LaBeouf dropped out of the project and the title role was briefly given to Zac Efron before LaBeouf returned to the project in August 2010. Dante Ariola was originally attached as director but left before filming began.

Filming took place between May and June 2012 and filmed on location in Romania.

LaBeouf reportedly tripped on acid while filming acid scenes. According to LaBeouf, he had to trip on the acid to really get into the head of his character and to emulate some of his acting heroes. "There's a way to do an acid trip like Harold & Kumar and there's a way to be on acid. What I know of acting, Sean Penn actually strapped up to that electric chair in Dead Man Walking. These are the guys that I look up to."

== Release ==
Wood criticised the American censors for insisting that a scene be cut in which her character receives oral sex from LaBeouf, while taking no issue with the many violent scenes:

The scene where the two main characters make 'love' was altered because someone felt that seeing a man give a woman oral sex made people 'uncomfortable', but the scenes in which people are murdered by having their heads blown off remained intact and unaltered... [Society] wants to shame women and put them down for enjoying sex, especially when (gasp) the man isn't getting off as well... Accept that women are sexual beings, accept that some men like pleasuring women. Accept that women don't just have to be fucked and say thank you. We are allowed and entitled to enjoy ourselves. It's time we put our foot down."

== Music ==
The official soundtrack album was released digitally on Feb 11, 2014, by Psychedelic Records. The soundtrack album featured 14 songs of score music composed by Christophe Beck and Deadmono.

No.	Title	Artist	Length
1.	"Charlie Countryman"	Christophe Beck and Deadmono	2:07
2.	"What Makes a Life"	Christophe Beck and Deadmono	2:09
3.	"Stealing the Funny Hat"	Christophe Beck and Deadmono	2:11
4.	"I Promise"	Christophe Beck and Deadmono	2:18
5.	"Victor Ibanescu"	Christophe Beck and Deadmono	1:23
6.	"Bucharest Taxi Ride"	Christophe Beck and Deadmono	2:22
7.	"Puppy Feet Girl"	Christophe Beck and Deadmono	2:02
8.	"Nigel"	Christophe Beck and Deadmono	1:51
9.	"Walking with Gabi"	Christophe Beck and Deadmono	3:48
10.	"Find Me Tomorrow"	Christophe Beck and Deadmono	3:20
11.	"Gabi's Story"	Christophe Beck and Deadmono	2:18
12.	"Videotape"	Christophe Beck and Deadmono	3:28
13.	"The Pearl and the Oyster"	Christophe Beck and Deadmono	4:38
14.	"The End"	Christophe Beck and Deadmono	6:24

== Reception ==
Charlie Countryman received negative reviews from critics. Review aggregator website Rotten Tomatoes reports a 27% approval rating, based on 66 reviews with an average rating of 3.93/10; the site's consensus reads: "Shia LaBeouf clearly relishes his role in Charlie Countryman, but his efforts can't salvage the movie's shallow script and overstuffed direction." Metacritic, which assigns a normalized score, rated it 31/100 based on 20 reviews.

John Anderson of Variety called it "a profoundly unnecessary film" with "strained attempts at magic realism". Justin Lowe of The Hollywood Reporter describe it as "an atmospheric feature that sets out to tackle big questions of love and destiny." Stephen Holden of The New York Times wrote, "this catastrophe of a movie zigzags drunkenly between action-adventure and surreal comedy with some magical realism slopped over it like ketchup." Robert Abele of the Los Angeles Times wrote, "Pulpy dross of surpassing dumbness, Charlie Countryman takes the blender approach to mixing dark adventure, doofus comedy and pie-eyed romance, but forgets to put the lid on when pulsed." Damon Wise of Empire gave a positive review, stating "Bond's use of music is excellent and his vision of eastern Europe both hellish and magical."
