= Chickens (TV series) =

- Genre: Sitcom
- Created by: Simon Bird; Jonny Sweet; Joe Thomas
- Written by: Simon Bird; Jonny Sweet; Joe Thomas
- Directed by: Ben Palmer
- Starring: Simon Bird; Jonny Sweet; Joe Thomas; Sarah Daykin; Emerald Fennell; Louise Ford; Amy Dawson; Vicki Pepperdine; Eileen Davies; Emma Fryer; Barry Humphries
- Opening theme: "Ain't Nobody Here but Us Chickens"
- Country of origin: United Kingdom
- Original language: English
- No. of series: 1
- No. of episodes: 6

Production
- Executive producers: Kenton Allen; Caroline Leddy
- Producer: John Rushton
- Running time: 30 mins (inc. adverts)
- Production company: Big Talk Productions

Original release
- Network: Sky 1
- Release: 22 August – 26 September 2013

Chickens is a British sitcom that was first broadcast on Channel 4 as a television pilot on 2 September 2011, as part of the channel's Comedy Showcase season of comedy pilots. It was then followed by a six-episode series that was commissioned on Sky 1 and broadcast between 22 August and 26 September 2013. The show is about three men who do not go off to fight in the First World War and consequently become social outcasts in their village. It was nominated for Best Comedy Programme at the 2014 Broadcast Awards.

== Cast and characters ==
- Simon Bird as Cecil: A young man who was rejected from the war due to his flat feet.
- Jonny Sweet as Bert: the dimwitted man of the trio of Chickens. Bert does tend to forget that the war is actually going on.
- Joe Thomas as George: a young man who refuses to participate in the war and in violence altogether.
- Sarah Daykin as Winky: George's fiancée
- Emerald Fennell as Agnes, Cecil's sister
- Louise Ford as Gracie
- Amy Dawson as Dot
- Vicki Pepperdine as Hesta
- Eileen Davies as Gladys
- Emma Fryer as Nellie
- Barry Humphries as Mr. Armstrong, the local headmaster (replaces Rupert Vansittart from the Pilot)
- Ellie Kendrick as Constance (episode 4)

== Pilot ==
The pilot episode was filmed partly on location in the village of Finchingfield in Essex, shooting exterior scenes in the square, the school and the church yard.

== Episodes ==
No.	Title	Directed by	Written by	Original release date	Viewers
1	Episode One	Ben Palmer	Simon Bird, Joe Thomas, Jonny Sweet	22 August 2013	642,000
Three chaps who have stayed behind in a sleepy English village during the First World War earn themselves the reputation of being cowards among the local women. George is keen to avoid the conflict, Cecil is unable to fight for medical reasons - and Bert is simply too stupid to understand what's going on.
2	Episode Two	Ben Palmer	Simon Bird, Joe Thomas, Jonny Sweet	29 August 2013	381,000
News arrives that the first Rittle man has died in battle, so Bert - ever the opportunist - decides to make a move on his widow. Meanwhile, George faces a moral dilemma at work and finds himself engaging in a tense one-on-one with the Headmaster, and Cecil struggles to find a plumber to fix the cottage's brown water problem.
3	Episode Three	Ben Palmer	Simon Bird, Joe Thomas, Jonny Sweet	5 September 2013	Under 397,000
A pretty girl called Penny asks Cecil to be her boyfriend, but the boys suspect she has an ulterior motive. Bert finds himself in need of alternative living arrangements after being thrown out of the cottage by George - but he appears to land on his feet when he settles into an extravagant abode that belongs to a serving soldier.
4	Episode Four	Ben Palmer	Simon Bird, Joe Thomas, Jonny Sweet	12 September 2013	Under 414,000
Cecil confides in Constance about his fallen foot arches, but feels he is being systematically emasculated by a lack of male company, and sets out to assert his manhood. Meanwhile, George goes on strike over the decision to remove German from the school curriculum, so Headmaster decides to replace him with Bert, whose unorthodox style proves a hit with the pupils and Winky.
5	Episode Five	Ben Palmer	Simon Bird, Joe Thomas, Jonny Sweet	19 September 2013	Under 349,000
Cecil is dismayed when George decides to throw a dinner party and invites a local woman rumoured to have leprosy. When she fails to turn up for the occasion he has a change of heart and becomes determined to befriend her.
6	Episode Six	Ben Palmer	Simon Bird, Joe Thomas, Jonny Sweet	26 September 2013	Under 350,000
The trio finally have more men to talk to when the soldiers return to Rittle-on-Sea on leave. Cecil is having trouble reconnecting with his old chums, Bert's sticky-fingered antics come back to bite him and George regrets giving advice to a private who wants to become a conscientious objector
