= Joe Thomas (actor) =

English actor and comedian (born 1983)

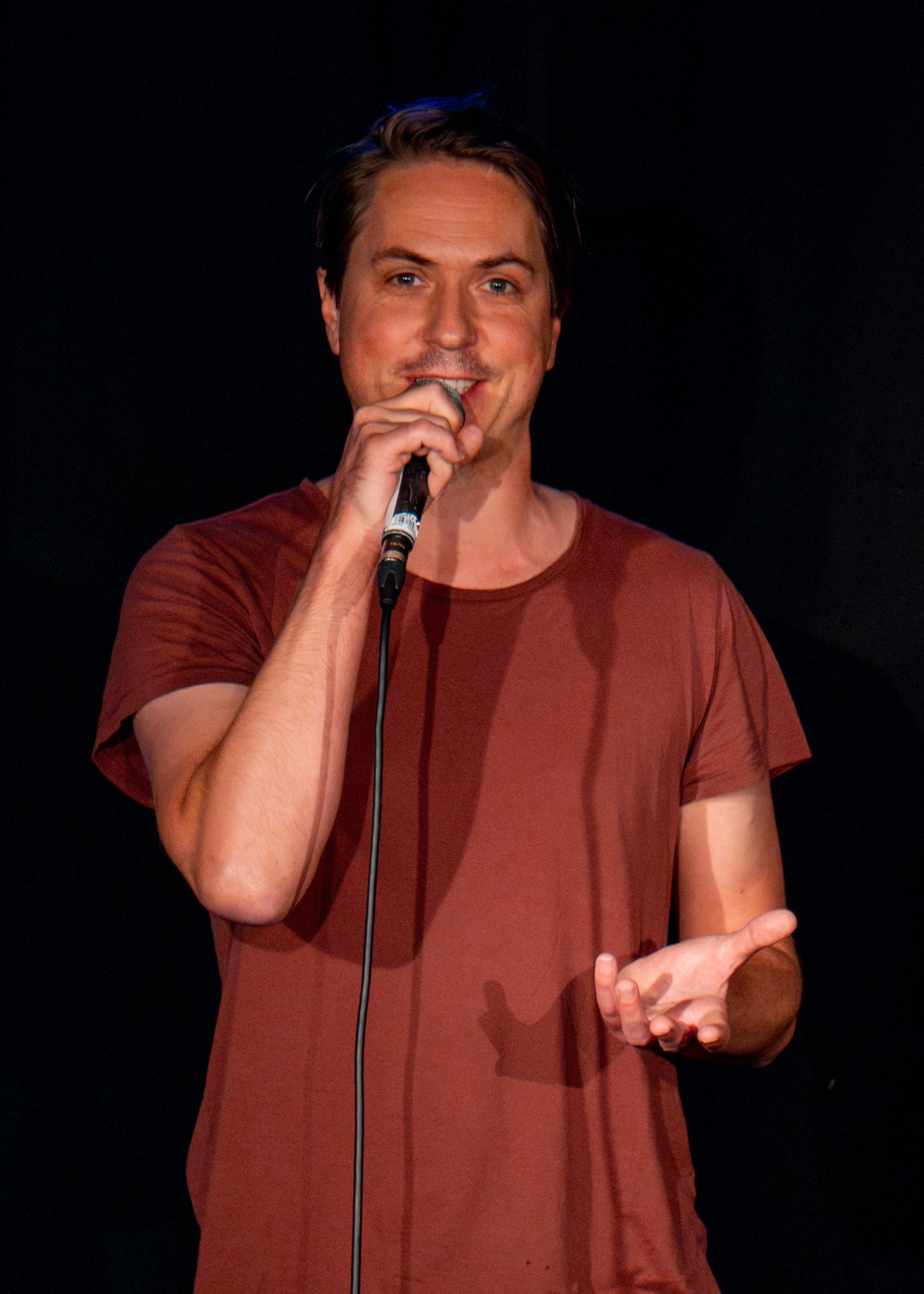
- Thomas at the Edinburgh Festival Fringe in 2024
- Born: Joseph Owen Thomas; 28 October 1983 (age 42); Chelmsford, Essex, England
- Education: Pembroke College, Cambridge
- Occupations: Actor; comedian
- Years active: 1997–present
- Television: The Inbetweeners; Fresh Meat; White Gold
- Partner: Hannah Tointon
- Children: 1

Joseph Owen Thomas (born 28 October 1983) is an English actor and comedian. He is best known for his breakthrough role as Simon Cooper in the E4 teen sitcom The Inbetweeners (2008–2010) and its two film adaptations, The Inbetweeners Movie (2011) and The Inbetweeners 2 (2014).

After The Inbetweeners concluded, Thomas remained connected to Channel 4, joining the cast of comedy-drama series Fresh Meat in 2011, playing Kingsley Owen until 2016. He was reunited with his Inbetweeners colleague James Buckley when they both joined the cast of BBC Two sitcom White Gold, where Thomas played Martin Lavender. In 2018, he starred in the comedy film The Festival, which was directed by Iain Morris, who co-created The Inbetweeners alongside his writing partner Damon Beesley.

== Early life and education ==
Joseph Owen Thomas was born on 28 October 1983 in Chelmsford, Essex, the first of four boys.

He attended King Edward VI Grammar School, Chelmsford before studying history at Pembroke College, Cambridge. At the University of Cambridge, Thomas was a member of the Footlights, alongside his future Inbetweeners co-star Simon Bird. Bird and Thomas served as the president and secretary of Footlights, respectively, from 2005–2006.

After his graduation in 2006, Thomas briefly shared a flat with Bird and fellow Pembroke graduate and Footlights alumnus Jonny Sweet.

== Career ==
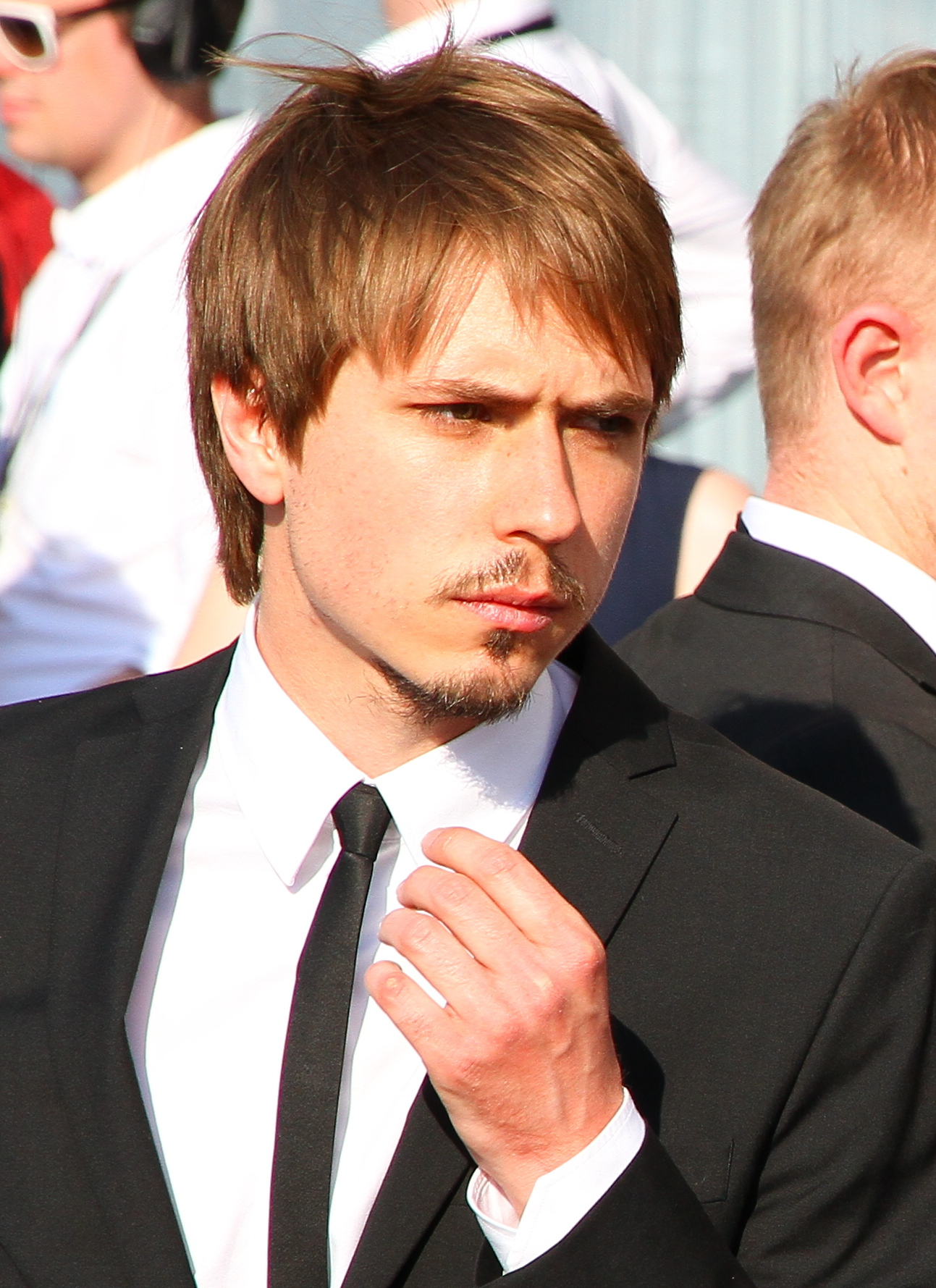
Thomas at the British Academy Television Awards in 2012

After entering the performing arts via the Footlights, Thomas performed with fellow University of Cambridge students at the Edinburgh Festival Fringe in a production of All's Well That Ends Well directed by author Duncan Barrett. Thomas was in a double act along with Sweet, and they have performed their show, The Jonny and Joe Show, at the Edinburgh Festival Fringe.

Thomas' big break in television was his role as Simon Cooper in The Inbetweeners, which was successful enough to spawn the two feature films The Inbetweeners Movie (2011) and The Inbetweeners 2 (2014). Together with Simon Bird and writing partner Jonny Sweet, he wrote Chickens, a satirical sketch about three conscientious objectors during World War I. It was broadcast as part of Channel 4's Comedy Showcase in 2011. In 2012, it was picked up by Sky One, which commissioned a full, six-episode series; filming began in late 2012 and debuted in August 2013.

Following this, Thomas starred in the student sitcom Fresh Meat as Kingsley Owen and played a maths teacher in the first episode of the second series of Threesome. In 2017, he began starring in the sitcom White Gold, along with his other Inbetweeners co-star James Buckley.

In 2018, Thomas starred in the comedy film The Festival, which was directed by Iain Morris, Also in that year, he began work on Proposal, a comedy radio series announced as part of BBC Radio 2's spring "funny fortnight", in which he plays Jamie, a man preparing to propose to his girlfriend Lucy (Pearl Mackie).

In 2021, Thomas performed in his own show at the Edinburgh Festival Fringe.

== Personal life ==
Thomas started dating fellow Inbetweeners star Hannah Tointon in 2010. After getting engaged, they were living on the Barbican Estate, London, in 2017. In October 2022, they announced the birth of their first child, a girl.

== Filmography ==
=== Film ===
Year	Title	Role	Notes
2011	The Inbetweeners Movie	Simon Cooper	
2011	A Trick of the Light	Joe (voice)	Short film
2012	Straw Donkey	Tom	Short film
2014	The Inbetweeners 2	Simon Cooper	
2015	Scottish Mussel	Danny	
2016	The Darkest Universe	Toby	
2018	The Festival	Nick Taylor	
2022	We Are Not Alone	Greggs	
2023	Mummies	Thut (voice)	
2025	Universal	Leo	
TBA	The Inbetweeners 3	Simon Cooper	

=== Television ===
Year	Title	Role	Notes
1997	Robot Wars	Himself (contestant)	Series 1, Episode 6
2008–2010	The Inbetweeners	Simon Cooper	18 episodes
2010	Comedy Showcase	George	Episode: "Chickens"
2011–2016	Fresh Meat	Kingsley Owen	30 episodes
2012	Threesome	Teacher	Episode: "Back to School"
2013	Chickens	George	6 episodes; also creator and writer
2017–2019	White Gold	Martin Lavender	12 episodes; also writer of 2 episodes
2019	Celebrity Mastermind	Himself (contestant)	Series 17, Episode 5
2019	The Inbetweeners: Fwends Reunited	Himself	Special
2019	Taskmaster	Himself (contestant)	Series 8
2021	House of Games	Himself (contestant)	Series 5, Week 3
2022	Would I Lie to You?	Himself (guest)	1 episode
2022	Hobby Man	Himself (guest)	1 episode
2022	Rhod Gilbert's Growing Pains	Himself (guest)	Series 4, Episode 4
2022	The Greatest Snowman	Himself (contestant)	1 episode
2023	Great British Bake Off: Stand up to Cancer	Himself (contestant)	1 episode; Star Baker
2023	Between the Covers	Himself (guest)	1 episode
2023	Maternal	Dr. Matt Malyon	6 episodes
2024	Rob Beckett's Smart TV	Himself (guest)	Series 1, Episode 6
2025	Celebrity Bear Hunt	Himself (contestant)	Series 1
2026	New Zealand Spy	Michael Anderson	Main cast (6 episodes); also writer

== Theatre ==
Year	Title	Role	Venue	Ref.
2023	The Crown Jewels	Tom Blood Jr/Suitor	Garrick Theatre	
