= The King Is Dead (TV series) =

Television series

- Created by: Simon Bird
- Starring: Simon Bird; Nick Mohammed; Katy Wix; Jonny Sweet; Mathew Baynton
- Voices of: Peter Dickson
- Country of origin: United Kingdom
- Original language: English
- No. of series: 1
- No. of episodes: 7 (list of episodes)

Production
- Executive producers: Margot Gavan Duffy; Suzy Lamb
- Running time: 30 minutes
- Production company: Talkback Thames

Original release
- Network: BBC Three
- Release: 2 September – 14 October 2010

The King Is Dead is a 2010 British comedy show created, written by, and starring Simon Bird. Also presenting were Nick Mohammed and Katy Wix. It aired on Thursdays at 10.30pm on BBC Three, with repeats on both Friday and Saturday.

== Overview ==
Each week on The King Is Dead a well-known public figure is hypothetically bumped off. It is down to the comedic interview panel, led by Simon Bird, to find a replacement. Three celebrities compete in an interview process in a bid to prove they are the best applicant for the available job.

== Episode list ==
In total six regular episodes and one clips show have been broadcast, seven in total (bold indicates winner).

No.	Title	Participants	Original release date
1	"The President of the USA"	**Sarah Beeny**; James Corden; Peaches Geldof	2 September 2010
2	"Chief of Police"	Kirsten O'Brien; **Caprice**; Graham Cole	9 September 2010
3	"The King"	**Jennie Bond**; Chloe Madeley; Louis Walsh	16 September 2010
4	"Assistant Regional Head of Sales"	**Eamonn Holmes**; Mollie King; Kate Walsh	23 September 2010
5	"King of the Jungle"	Dappy; **George Lamb**; Terry Nutkins	30 September 2010
6	"Father Christmas"	**Derek Acorah**; Huey Morgan; Nathan Stewart-Jarrett	7 October 2010
7	"Long Live the Best Bits"	Highlights show	14 October 2010

== Reception ==
The show was cancelled in October 2010 after it was panned by critics and received low ratings.
