= Robin Weaver =

British actress (born 1970)

Robin Weaver (born April 1970) is an English actress, best known for playing the roles of Clara in The Muppet Christmas Carol and recurring character Pamela Cooper in the E4 sitcom The Inbetweeners and its feature-length films, The Inbetweeners Movie and The Inbetweeners 2. She has also appeared in several television adverts.

== Selected filmography ==
- Somewhere to Run (1989)
- The Woman in Black (1989)
- The Muppet Christmas Carol (1992)
- The Catherine Tate Show (2005)
- Peter Pan in Scarlet (Radio, 2006)
- The Inbetweeners (TV series, 2008–2010)
- The Inbetweeners Movie (2011)
- The Inbetweeners 2 (2014)
- Black Mirror (2014) Feature-length special "White Christmas"
- Shetland (TV Series, 2026)
