= Somewhere to Run =

- Genre: Drama
- Written by: Matthew Jacobs
- Directed by: Carol Wiseman
- Starring: Robin Weaver; Vicky Murdock; Angela Pleasence; Michael Jayston
- Music by: Carl Davis
- Country of origin: United Kingdom
- Original language: English

Production
- Producer: Alan Horrox
- Cinematography: Jim Howlett
- Editor: Trevor Waite
- Running time: 79 minutes
- Production company: Thames Television

Original release
- Network: ITV
- Release: 11 July 1989

Somewhere to Run is a 1989 British drama television film about teenage runaways. Directed by Carol Wiseman and written by Matthew Jacobs, it stars Robin Weaver and Vicky Murdock as two teenage girls who run away from home and find themselves on the streets of London. The film also stars Angela Pleasence and Michael Jayston. It was produced by Thames Television for the ITV network, and received its ITV debut on 11 July 1989.

== Plot summary ==
Teenagers Sarah (Weaver) and Debbie (Murdock) run away from home, before meeting shortly after arriving in London. Debbie, the older and more streetwise of the two, is running from a generally bad home life, where her family is poor and her father drinks excessively. Sarah is running from a more affluent home, where she has been sexually abused by her father (Jayston). Both girls stay at a hostel for runaways. Debbie manages to get herself into college, while Sarah unsuccessfully tries to get her father prosecuted, but is instead returned home by the authorities. She runs away again and ends up on the streets selling herself. She attempts suicide by stepping out in front of a lorry but is injured and ends up in hospital. The film ends as she lies in hospital, while in the background a radio plays. Debbie calls a request show asking for a dedication for Sarah, with whom she has lost touch.

== Cast ==
- Robin Weaver as Sarah
- Vicky Murdock as Debbie
- Angela Pleasence as Anita Fitzpatrick
- Michael Jayston as Roger Fitzpatrick
- Josette Simon as Christine
- Paul Brooke as Abrahams
- Sara Kestelman as Magistrate
- Michael Grandage as Tim
- Kathryn Pogson as Liz
- Natasha Pyne as Debbie's Mother
- Ray Trickett as Gillette
- Richard Cordery as Lawyer
- James Hayes as Client in Car
- Natalie Abbott as Karen
- Walter Sparrow as Neighbour
