= The Pyramid (film) =

2014 American found footage horror film by Grégory Levasseur

- Theatrical release poster
- Directed by: Grégory Levasseur
- Written by: Daniel Meersand; Nick Simon
- Produced by: Alexandre Aja; Mark Canton; Chady Eli Mattar; Scott C. Silver
- Starring: Ashley Hinshaw; Denis O'Hare; James Buckley
- Cinematography: Laurent Tangy
- Edited by: Scott C. Silver
- Music by: Nima Fakhrara
- Production companies: Silvatar Media; Fox International Productions; Atmosphere Pictures
- Distributed by: 20th Century Fox
- Release date: December 5, 2014
- Running time: 89 minutes
- Country: United States
- Language: English
- Budget: $6.5 million
- Box office: $16.9 million

The Pyramid is a 2014 American found footage supernatural horror film directed by Grégory Levasseur, in his directorial debut, produced by Alexandre Aja, and distributed by 20th Century Fox. The plot follows an archaeological team attempting to unlock the secrets of a lost pyramid only to find themselves hunted by an insidious creature. The film stars Ashley Hinshaw, Denis O'Hare, James Buckley, and Daniel Amerman. Released on December 5, 2014, the film was negatively received by critics.

== Plot ==
In Egypt, a three-sided pyramid is discovered buried beneath the desert surface by an archaeological team led by Dr. Miles Holden. After a remote-controlled rover vehicle sent to map the interior goes offline the team enters the pyramid to recover it. They soon become lost and enter a room with an unstable floor that collapses beneath them, injuring Zahir whose leg is crushed and pinned beneath debris. Sunni attempts to climb back up but is attacked by an emaciated feline creature and forced to retreat. The team leaves Zahir to look for a way out. Moments later, Zahir's screams are heard - the team return to find only his severed leg left pinned under the rock.

Chased through a tunnel by a pack of the creatures, they are rescued by an Egyptian soldier who is then killed by a larger creature. The team comes upon a carved mural that depicts passages from the Book of the Dead and its guide to immortality – Anubis's weighing of the heart for access into the afterlife. Sunni falls into a pit and is impaled on several spikes before she is set upon by the creatures. The team try to rescue her but she succumbs to her injuries and they are forced to retreat.

The team finds a burial chamber which contains the corpse of a 19th Century explorer along with his journal detailing a possible escape route. As Holden examines the map, a clawed hand stabs through his chest, tearing out his heart. His daughter Nora and cameraman Fitzie flee, but after realizing they're trapped, they return to find Holden still alive tied to a large scale. The large creature re-enters the room and Nora identifies it as the Egyptian god Anubis, who weighs Holden's heart to determine his worthiness to enter the afterlife. He dies when Anubis eats his heart.

After Anubis leaves, Nora and Fitzie decipher hieroglyphs in the chamber that indicate the pyramid was constructed to imprison Anubis, who is seeking to reunite with his creator, Osiris. They find an air shaft with a ladder left behind by the soldier, but are pursued by Anubis, who kills Fitzie. Now alone, Nora is captured by Anubis. Tied to an obelisk, she uses a blade hidden in her hand to cut through her bonds. Once free, she wounds Anubis, who is then attacked by a horde of cats. Nora climbs her way to freedom and collapses just before clearing the pyramid's exit. She awakens to find a child playing with her camera. Anubis suddenly appears from the dark and lunges at them as the screen cuts to black.

== Cast ==
- Ashley Hinshaw as Dr. Nora Holden
- Denis O'Hare as Dr. Miles Holden
- James Buckley as Terry 'Fitzie' Fitsimmons
- Christa-Marie Nicola as Sunni Marsh
- Amir K as Michael Zahir
- Faycal Attougui as Corporal Shadid
- Philip Shelley as The Provost
- Ait Hamou Amine as Boy
- Omar Benbrahim as Chubby Intern
- Joseph Beddelem as Taxi driver
- Chakir El Faaiz as Skinny Digger
- Daniel Amerman as Luke
- Garsha Arristos as Egyptian Worker

== Production ==
This film was directed by Grégory Levasseur, making his directorial debut, produced by Alexandre Aja and distributed by 20th Century Fox. Robert O. Kaplan, Alfred S. Newman, Justine Raczkiewicz were credited as executive producers of the film. The plot centers around a team of archaeologists who uncover a lost pyramid in the Egyptian desert and encounter terrifying events as they explore its interior.

== Release ==
On July 7, 2014, 20th Century Fox picked up the distribution rights to the film, and was set for a release date for December 5, 2014. It was then released on DVD and Blu-ray on May 5, 2015, as well on video on demand on April 17, 2015.

=== Box office ===
North America

Released on December 5, 2014, in 589 theatres, the film underperformed, earning only $1.3 million. Although investors originally expected the film to make more than $20 million domestically, it made less than $2.8 million.

Other territories

Outside North America, the film was released on the same day in 18 markets including the U.K., Russia and Vietnam. It earned $14.1 million internationally.

== Reception ==
The Pyramid was panned by critics, with Moviefone and CraveOnline both naming it one of the worst films of 2014. On Rotten Tomatoes, the film has an approval rating of 13%, based on 45 reviews, with an average rating of 3/10. The site's consensus reads "Poorly lit and thinly writ, The Pyramid houses little more than clunky dialogue, amateurish acting, and dusty found-footage scares." Metacritic, which uses a weighted average, assigned a score of 24 out of 100 based on 16 reviews, indicating "generally unfavorable reviews".

Lelsie Felperin of The Hollywood Reporter called it "a stinker in every sense." Drew Taylor of The Playlist wrote, "The Pyramid is cursed. Only, instead of an ancient evil, it's just plagued by inept filmmaking." Alonso Duralde of The Wrap said, "The ultimate moral of The Pyramid, and of almost every other film where an underground mummy or scarab or tomb wreaks havoc, is that some things were never meant to be uncovered. Some movies, too."
