= Marsha Shandur =

British DJ (born 1977)

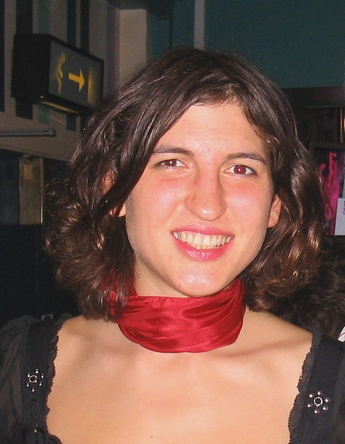
- Shandur in 2006
- Born: 1977 (age 48–49); London, UK
- Occupation: Radio Presenter (former)

Marsha Shandur (born 1977) is a former radio presenter best known for presenting on Xfm London and Xfm Manchester (as Marsha).

== Career ==
Shandur presented numerous shows on Xfm during her 8 years at the station before announcing that she was leaving Xfm to live in Toronto, Ontario, Canada in January 2011.

She was the music supervisor for E4 shows The Inbetweeners and the first two seasons of Made in Chelsea.

She also made a podcast for Xfm called Marsha Meets... in which she has interviewed comedians such as Stewart Lee, Rufus Hound, Greg Davies, Richard Herring and Russell Kane. The Guardian has twice named it one of the world's Top Ten Best Comedy Podcasts.

In 2016, Shandur co-authored the book Off The Mic: The World's Best Stand Up Comedians Get Serious About Comedy with Deborah Frances-White which came out on Bloomsbury Publishing. The book, about the mechanics of stand-up comedy, features new interviews with 42 comedians, including Eddie Izzard, Phill Jupitus, Sarah Millican, Jim Jefferies, Lewis Black and Marc Maron. The Independent called it "Fascinating – part textbook, part therapist’s notebook." In December 2016, it was nominated for a Chortle Award.

== Personal life ==
On 11 November 2012, Shandur ran a solo marathon in London. She made the decision to do this after the New York City Marathon was cancelled due to Hurricane Sandy. Shandur's run was covered by the BBC, ITV, Xfm and Complete Music Update in the UK and CBC Radio One in Canada. This helped her raise over £3,600 for The Royal Marsden's Cancer Charity, a charity she had chosen in honour of Lisa Lynch, author of The C Word.

Openly bisexual, Shandur lives in Toronto, Canada with her partner.
