= Tamla Kari =

British actress

- Born: Tamla Kari Cummins; 27 July 1988 (age 38); Coventry, West Midlands, England
- Education: Drama Centre London
- Occupation: Actress
- Years active: 2008–present

Tamla Kari Cummins (born 27 July 1988), known professionally as Tamla Kari, is an English actress. She is best known for her role as Constance Bonacieux in the BBC television series The Musketeers, Danielle Fisher in the ITV television series The Job Lot, and Lucy in The Inbetweeners Movie and The Inbetweeners 2.

== Early life ==
Kari was born and raised in Coventry, West Midlands. She attended public school and started taking dance lessons when she was four years old. Around five years old, she performed her first show, tap dancing to "The Sun Has Got His Hat On". She was inspired to act through her creative and musical father and by her mother who had been an actress.

== Career ==
During the second term of her final year at the Drama Centre London, Kari won the role of Lucy in The Inbetweeners Movie. Kari would later graduate from Drama Centre London in 2011 as part of Group 47. She has since had various roles in a number of plays. She also appeared in the fourth series of the BBC Three supernatural drama series Being Human and the second series of Silk. She formerly appeared in the BBC Three sitcom Cuckoo, which premiered on 25 September 2012, as well as in The Musketeers, in which she portrayed Constance Bonacieux. In 2013, she played Danielle Fisher in the ITV comedy The Job Lot. In 2014, she reprised the role of Lucy in The Inbetweeners 2. In 2020, Kari began appearing in The First Team as Olivia, a comedy series created by the same team as The Inbetweeners. In 2021, Kari narrated for the 7th series of 999: On the frontline.

== Filmography ==
Key
†	Denotes films that have not yet been released

=== Film ===
Year	Title	Role	Notes
2011	The Inbetweeners Movie	Lucy	
2014	The Inbetweeners 2	Lucy	
2023	Christmas At The Holly Day Inn	Emma	
2026 †	Harkness		Filming completed

=== Television ===
Year	Title	Role	Notes
2012	Being Human	Pearl	
2012	Silk	Izzy Calvin	
2012	Cuckoo	Rachel Thompson	Series 1
2013	The Job Lot	Danielle Fisher	Series 1
2014–2016	The Musketeers	Constance d'Artagnan (formerly Bonacieux)	Main cast
2016	Young Hyacinth	Violet	
2017	Stan Lee's Lucky Man	Rachel Spikes	
2018	Vera	Hayley Fenton	Series 8, part 1
2018	Call the Midwife	Nadine	
2019	Plebs	Calypso	
2019	Britannia	Bridget	
2019	The Cure	Helene	
2020	The First Team	Olivia Talbot	BBC Two sitcom
2021	999: On the frontline	Narrator	Channel 4 Documentary Series 7 onwards
2022	The Ipcress File	Deborah	ITV Drama Series
2022	Shakespeare & Hathaway: Private Investigators	Vanessa-Rose	Series 4, Episode 3 — "Too Much of Water"
2024	DI Ray	Lucy Chapman	Series 2
2024	Beyond Paradise	Fiona Benstead	Christmas Special 2024
2025	Sister Boniface Mysteries	DC Heather Thorne	Series 4, Episode 6 - "There's No 'I' in Slaughter"
2026	Grace	Eden Siddiqui	Series 6, Episode 1 - "Left You Dead"

=== Stage ===
- Saturday Night and Sunday Morning
- Solo Showing
- An Experiment with an Air Pump
- Tartuffe
- Twelfth Night
- Don Carlos
- The Kitchen
- Our Town
- Philistines
- Versailles
- This is Living
- While the Sun Shines
- Diminished
