= The Inbetweeners =

British TV teen sitcom

- Genre: Coming-of-age; Sex comedy; Teen sitcom; Cringe comedy
- Created by: Damon Beesley; Iain Morris
- Written by: Damon Beesley; Iain Morris
- Directed by: Gordon Anderson; Ben Palmer; Damon Beesley; Iain Morris
- Starring: Simon Bird; James Buckley; Blake Harrison; Joe Thomas
- Narrated by: Simon Bird
- Opening theme: "Gone Up in Flames" (instrumental) by Morning Runner
- Composer: Marsha Shandur
- Country of origin: United Kingdom
- Original language: English
- No. of series: 3
- No. of episodes: 18 (list of episodes)

Production
- Executive producers: Damon Beesley; Iain Morris; Caroline Leddy
- Producer: Christopher Young
- Cinematography: Rob Kitzmann; Jamie Cairney; Ben Wheeler
- Editors: William Webb; Charlie Fawcett; Billy Sneddon
- Running time: 22–25 minutes
- Production companies: Bwark Productions; Young Films

Original release
- Network: E4
- Release: 1 May 2008 – 18 October 2010

Related
- The Inbetweeners Movie; The Inbetweeners 2 The Inbetweeners 3

The Inbetweeners is a British coming-of-age television sitcom, which originally aired on E4 from 2008 to 2010, and was created and written by Damon Beesley and Iain Morris. The series follows the misadventures of suburban teenager William (Will) McKenzie (Simon Bird) and his friends Simon Cooper (Joe Thomas), Neil Sutherland (Blake Harrison) and Jay Cartwright (James Buckley) at the fictional Rudge Park Comprehensive. The four find themselves in awkward situations of their own making, whilst dealing with school life, uncaring staff, male bonding, lad culture and adolescent sexuality. Despite receiving an initially lukewarm reception, it has been described as a classic and amongst the most successful British sitcoms of the 21st century.

The programme was nominated for Best Situation Comedy at BAFTA twice, in 2009 and 2010. At the British Academy Television Awards 2010, it won the Audience Award, the only category voted for by the public. At the 2011 British Comedy Awards, the programme also won the award for Outstanding Contribution to British Comedy.

The Inbetweeners Movie was released on 17 August 2011 to box office success, and a sequel followed on 6 August 2014. An American version was broadcast on MTV, but was quickly axed after low ratings and poor critical reception. In October 2025, Morris and Beesley's production company Fudge Park signed an agreement with distributor Banijay UK to "unlock the rights and the potential to bring The Inbetweeners back for new audiences across a range of platforms including film, TV and stage." This lead to the announcement of a third film entering production in September 2026, set for a 2027 release.

== History ==
Damon Beesley and Iain Morris met as producers on Channel 4's The 11 O'Clock Show. Following posts as commissioners at Channel 4, where Morris shepherded Peep Show, the two launched their own company, Bwark Productions, in 2004 and landed their first series with The Inbetweeners. A pilot for the programme was produced in 2006 under the direction of James Bobin titled "Baggy Trousers".

E4 originally aired the first series in May 2008, and Channel 4 also broadcast it in November that year. The second series began screening in the UK on 2 April 2009 and finished on 7 May 2009. A third series was commissioned by E4, commencing on 13 September 2010 and ending on 18 October 2010. The first episode of the third series had the highest-ever audience for an E4 original commission. Following the conclusion of the third series, the cast and crew of the programme indicated that there would be no fourth series as the programme had run its course, but that an Inbetweeners movie would be produced, set some time after the third series and following the cast on a holiday in Malia, Crete, Greece.

For Red Nose Day 2011, the stars of the programme travelled around the UK in the yellow Fiat Cinquecento Hawaii featured in the programme in a special named The Inbetweeners: Rude Road Trip. The aim was to try to find the 50 rudest place names in the country.

In November 2018, it was announced that a special retrospective programme featuring the cast would be aired to mark the 10th anniversary of the programme's first airing in 2008. Titled Fwends Reunited, it was broadcast on 1 January 2019; it was poorly received by critics and fans of the series, leading to James Buckley making a public apology.

In June 2020, the content on its YouTube channel was removed, owing to the licensing rights changing owners.

In October 2025, Morris and Beesley's production company, Fudge Park, signed an agreement with distributor Banijay UK to unlock "the rights and the potential to bring The Inbetweeners back for new audiences across a range of platforms including film, TV and stage."

On 7 September 2026, Netflix announced that The Inbetweeners 3 was officially in production.

== Cast ==
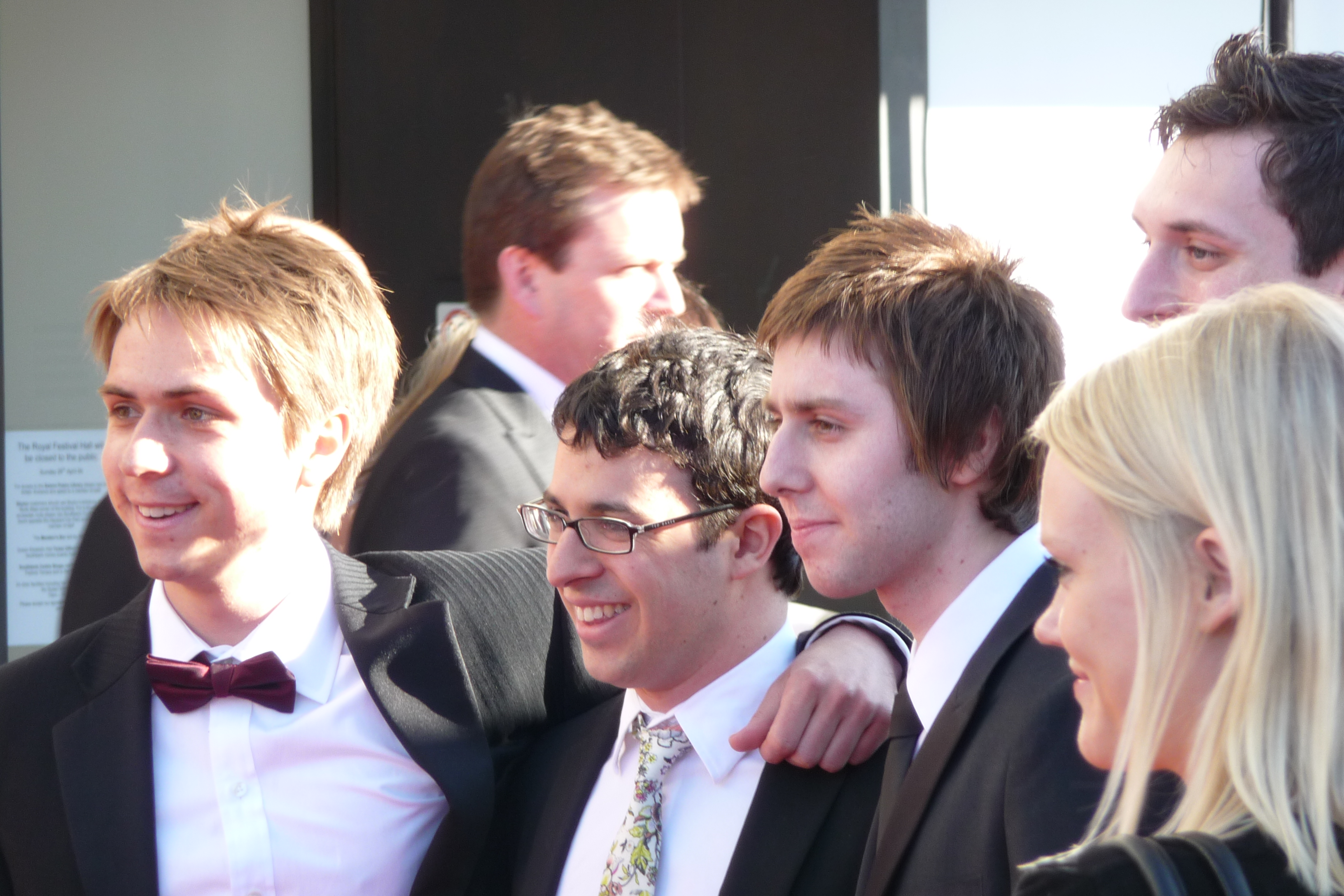
The Inbetweeners cast in 2009. From left to right: Joe Thomas, Simon Bird, James Buckley and Blake Harrison

=== Main cast ===
The four main characters are seen in every episode as well as the 2011 and 2014 films. They consist of:

- Will McKenzie (Simon Bird) is the programme's central character, with his voiceover narrating each episode. In the first episode, he has been transferred from a private school, following his parents' divorce, to Rudge Park Comprehensive, where he eventually befriends the others. Will is the most intelligent and studious of the group but despite his sensible nature, he often gives in to peer pressure to carry out questionable acts and suffers the most humiliation for it.
- Simon Cooper (Joe Thomas) is the most cynical, irritable and hot-headed of the group, being prone to bouts of hysterical swearing at the slightest provocation; his on-off relationship with long-time crush Carli propels many of the plots. However, he is also seen to be the most normal of the group whose frequent failures and humiliations (oftentimes the fault of the other characters) leave fans "feeling sorry for him over and over again".
- Jay Cartwright (James Buckley) is the most immature and arrogant of the boys. He is by far the most vulgar, is obsessed with sex, and lies compulsively, though these traits are revealed to be a result of frequent belittlement by his father. At the end of series 3, it is hinted that Jay may have been sexually abused as a child.
- Neil Sutherland (Blake Harrison) is gentle, gullible (almost always falling for Jay's lies) and of relatively low intelligence. He is the most sexually experienced member of the group, owing to his laid-back and unassuming nature.

=== Recurring characters ===
- Carli D'Amato (Emily Head) is Simon's long-term love interest. She is popular, demonstrating a good deal of influence over her peers, including school bullies. Although Carli expresses interest in Simon romantically on a few occasions, she seems aware that he is far more interested in her than she is in him, stringing him along when she so desires.
- Mr Phil Gilbert (Greg Davies) is head of the sixth form. Cynical, obnoxious and authoritarian, he has minimal interest in his work and treats his pupils with ambivalence or contempt. He displays a particular dislike for Will.
- Charlotte Hinchcliffe (Emily Atack; series 1–2, guest series 3) is the most attractive and popular girl in the school (claiming to have had "eleven lovers already") who briefly dates Will. She is very confident and a year above the four boys, who hold her in high regard. Unlike many popular girls, Charlotte is often kind-hearted and genuine. Although she sometimes treats Will badly, over time she appears to develop genuine affection for him.
- Mark Donovan (Henry Lloyd-Hughes) is the sixth form's bully and Charlotte's ex-boyfriend. He often belittles and picks on the four boys, whom he refers to as "Team Twat". Like many bullies, Donovan acts pleasantly in front of parents or teachers in lieu of his true persona. However, he inadvertently reveals a sensitive side to Will after breaking up with Charlotte, though threatens him with death if he speaks of it.
- Polly McKenzie (Belinda Stewart-Wilson) is Will's mother. She is highly attractive and a principal object of Will's friends' desires, who often crudely mention her sexually. Neil has often asked Will if he can ask her out, with Will always rejecting. Aside from her appearance, Polly is kind and mostly understanding of Will's concerns, although this sometimes ends in her unwittingly embarrassing him.
- Pamela Cooper (Robin Weaver) is Simon's mother. She is caring and supportive towards her son, but her efforts are often met by embarrassment and surliness from him.
- Alan Cooper (Martin Trenaman) is Simon's loving and protective father. A running gag involves him embarrassing Simon around his friends when recalling his sexual adventures with his wife.
- Terry Cartwright (David Schaal; series 2–3, guest series 1) is Jay's father. He regularly insults, embarrasses and belittles Jay in front of his peers, and takes neither him nor his false reports of sexual exploits seriously.
- Kevin Sutherland (Alex Macqueen) is Neil's father. He is divorced and is often believed to be a closeted gay man, which he and his son deny. The boys frequently make fun of Neil because of this.
- Big John (John Seaward) is a fellow student. John is one of the new kids who start school on the same day as Will. He is often referred to as one of the "freaks" and seen as an overweight social outcast whom the boys try to avoid. Despite this treatment, he is kind and always does the right thing, such as coming to the defence of Will and trying to boost Jay's confidence, discussing with him the frustration of wanting to be noticed.
- Tara Brown (Hannah Tointon; series 3) is Simon's short-term girlfriend. She is mostly ambivalent towards the other three, wanting to spend time with Simon alone. She tries, however, to set up Will with her friend Kerry via a double-date, which ends in disaster. Her relationship with Simon meets a similar end, with them breaking up after Simon becomes enraged at his failure to get an erection during sex.

== Episodes ==
Series	Episodes	Originally released	
Series	Episodes	First released	Last released
1	6	1 May 2008	29 May 2008
2	6	2 April 2009	7 May 2009
3	6	13 September 2010	18 October 2010
Film		17 August 2011 (1st Movie); 6 August 2014 (2nd Movie)	

== Music ==
The opening theme tune to The Inbetweeners is an instrumental version of "Gone Up in Flames" by English rock band Morning Runner. The first series also features music by Rachel Stevens, Tellison, Paolo Nutini, The Maccabees, Air Traffic, Calvin Harris, The Ting Tings, Arctic Monkeys, Theaudience, The Fratellis, Vampire Weekend, The Drums, Two Door Cinema Club, Take That, Mystery Jets, Kid British, Phoenix, General Fiasco, Gorillaz, Hot Chip, Belle and Sebastian, Field Music, Jamie T, The Libertines, Rihanna, Oasis, Jack Peñate, Guillemots, The Feeling, Kate Nash, The Wombats, The Jam, The Cure, Lily Allen, Mumm-Ra, Kylie Minogue and Feist. The second series also featured instrumentals of Adele, Supergrass, Biffy Clyro, Passion Pit, Royworld, MGMT, Maxïmo Park and The Cribs and the third series also featured instrumentals of Ludacris and Mr Understanding by Pete and the Pirates. A soundtrack album, The Inbetweeners Soundtrack, was released in 2009.

The music was chosen by the music supervisor and then Xfm DJ Marsha Shandur.

== Reception ==
=== Critical reception ===
The Inbetweeners received generally positive reviews from television critics. At Metacritic, the first series earned a score of 73 out of 100, based on 7 reviews, indicating "Generally favorable reviews".

Joe McNally, writing for The Independent, commends "exquisitely accurate dialogue, capturing the feel of adolescence perfectly", and Will Dean of The Guardian comments that the programme "captures the pathetic sixth-form male experience quite splendidly". The series is often contrasted with E4's successful teen drama Skins; commentators have offered that "The Inbetweeners' portrayal of dull suburbia is closer [than Skins] to the drab teen years most of us spent, rather than the decadent time we wished we spent."

=== Legacy ===
Since its airing, The Inbetweeners has gained a cult following and been described as a phenomenon in British popular culture, particularly noted for its authenticity to growing up in Britain – so much so that viewers have incorporated many of its quotes and in-jokes into daily use.

In 2019, The Guardian ranked the series 74th in its list of the 100 best TV shows of the 21st century.

=== Ratings ===
The first series began on 1 May 2008, with the pilot episode garnering 238,000 viewers. The series averaged 459,000 viewers, with 474,000 viewers watching the series finale. The Inbetweeners received two nominations at the British Comedy Awards; the programme was nominated for "Best New British Television Comedy (Scripted)" and Simon Bird was nominated for "Best Male Comedy Newcomer". Both won their respective categories. The programme was also voted by the British Comedy Guide website as the "Best New British TV Sitcom 2008". It was nominated for "Best Situation Comedy" at the British Academy Television Awards 2009, ultimately losing out to The IT Crowd. It then won the Audience Award at the British Academy Television Awards 2010.

The first episode of series two, which aired on E4 at 10 pm (BST) 2 April 2009, averaged 958,000 viewers, with another 234,000 viewers watching at 11 pm on the time-shift channel E4 +1 meaning it was watched by 1.2 million, the highest audience of 2009 for E4.

Episode one of series three aired on 13 September 2010 on UK digital terrestrial network E4, attracting a record breaking overnight average audience of 2.6m viewers (12.5% audience share) in its 10 pm slot, the highest ever viewing figure for a programme screened on the channel until 2011 when Glee beat the record. For this series, it was moved to Monday instead of Thursday but kept its 10pm slot.

=== Awards ===
- Best New TV Comedy, British Comedy Awards 2008
- Best Male Comedy Newcomer (Simon Bird), British Comedy Awards 2008
- Best New British TV Sitcom, The Comedy.co.uk Awards 2008
- Best Comedy Show, TV Quick & TV Choice Awards 2009
- Nominated for Best Situation Comedy, British Academy Television Awards 2009
- Best TV Show, NME Awards 2010
- Best Television Comedy Actor (Simon Bird), British Comedy Awards 2009
- Nominated for Best Male Comedy Performance (Simon Bird), British Academy Television Awards 2010
- Nominated for Best Situation Comedy, British Academy Television Awards 2010
- YouTube Audience Award, British Academy Television Awards 2010
- Best Situation Comedy, Rose d'Or Awards 2010
- Digital Choice National Television Awards 2011
- British Comedy Academy Outstanding Achievement British Comedy Awards 2011
- Nominated for Best Male Comedy Performance (James Buckley), British Academy Television Awards 2011
- Best Comedy, 2012 Empire Awards

== Worldwide broadcasting ==
BBC America began airing The Inbetweeners from 25 January 2010. The network aired both of the first two series as a single 12-episode series. The same was done by MTV Latin America.

In 2010, The Inbetweeners started airing in Australia on the Nine Network's digital channel GO!, on Super Channel in Canada, on the comedy channel TV4 Komedi in Sweden, on TV2 in New Zealand, on MTV Latin America. In Israel, yes Next aired the first two series, while the third series airdate is unknown. The three seasons came in 2012 to HOT VOD. In 2011, the series was premiered in Brazil on I.Sat and on 13 August 2013 the Brazilian streaming site "Muu" premiered the British production.

On 28 February 2011, The Inbetweeners started airing in France on MCM.

The Australian channel ABC2 aired the programme from 8 January 2015.

Country	Network(s)	Premiere
United Kingdom	E4/Channel 4/E4 Extra	1 May 2008
Argentina	MTV Latin America	23 July 2010
Australia	GO! UKTV; ABC2	2010; 2011; 2015
Belgium	JIM	2010
Brazil	MTV Brasil; I.Sat	2010 (MTV Brasil); 2011 (I.Sat)
Canada	Super Channel	2010
Colombia	MTV Latin America	2010
Finland	Yle TV2	2012
France	MCM; NRJ12	28 February 2011
Iceland	RÚV	2012
India	Comedy Central (India)	2012
Ireland	E4/Channel 4/E4 Extra; RTÉ Two	1 May 2008; 9 January 2012
Israel	yes Next, HOTVOD	2010
Italy	MTV Italy, BonsaiTV	2010
Sweden	TV4 Komedi	2010
Netherlands	Veronica; MTV Netherlands	6 December 2011; 2012
New Zealand	TV2; UKTV	2010
Norway	NRK 3	Summer 2011
Portugal	MTV Portugal	2010
Russia	2x2, Gravi-TV	31 October 2011
Spain	3XL (in Catalan)	2010
United States	BBC America	25 January 2010

== Home media ==
- Series 1 was released on DVD on 2 June 2008.
- Series 2 was released on DVD on 18 May 2009.
- Series 1–2 boxset was released on DVD on 18 May 2009.
- Series 3 was released on DVD on 25 October 2010.
- Series 1–3 boxset was released on 25 October 2010.
- The Inbetweeners Movie was released on DVD and Blu-ray Disc on 12 December 2011 in the UK.
- The Inbetweeners 2 was released on DVD and Blu-ray on 1 December 2014 in the UK.

All of the DVDs received an 18 certificate in the United Kingdom and MA15+ in Australia owing to their high quantity of strong language, crude humour and strong, frequent, sex references. The theatrical version of The Inbetweeners Movie received a 15 certificate in the United Kingdom, with the extended cut release receiving an 18 certificate.

== Subsequent media ==
=== Films ===
In September 2009, Beesley and Morris confirmed that a film had been commissioned by Film4. The plot revolves around the four boys, now eighteen years old, going on holiday to Malia, Greece. It was released in cinemas on 17 August 2011 with a 15 certificate in the UK. The original film was also released in the United States on 7 September 2012, it was very successful. From a budget of £3.5 million, the film made a global box office of over £57 million.

At the beginning of August 2013, creators Iain Morris and Damon Beesley confirmed that a second Inbetweeners film would be made with a planned release date of 6 August 2014 in the UK and Ireland; they released a statement saying "We couldn't be more excited to be making another Inbetweeners movie. A new chapter in the lives of the Inbetweeners feels like the very least we can do to thank the fans for their phenomenal response to the first movie." This sequel is set in Australia.

In September 2026, Netflix confirmed production on a third film had commenced with the main original cast members reprising their roles, and with creators Damon Beesley and Iain Morris returning to write and direct the film.

=== Books ===
There have been two books released:

- The Inbetweeners Yearbook was released by Century Books on 29 September 2011. ISBN 1846059275
- The Inbetweeners Scriptbook was released by Century Books on 25 October 2012. ISBN 1780891059

=== American version ===
In 2008, Iain Morris and Damon Beesley were asked by ABC to produce a pilot for an American version of The Inbetweeners. The pilot was not picked up by the network, but they have given Morris and Beesley a second blind script commitment for a future project which the two will create.

On 31 March 2011, it was announced that MTV had ordered a 12-episode first season for an American version of The Inbetweeners. A pilot episode, written by Brad Copeland, was given the green light in September 2010. Copeland also serves as executive producer on the series along with Beesley and Morris. The series ran for one season from 20 August to 5 November 2012, before being cancelled by MTV owing to low ratings.

The American version began airing in the UK on 5 December 2012 on E4. A UK DVD release of the American version was released on 8 January 2013. The American version was broadcast on Viacom-owned Freeview channel Viva from 4 August 2014.

=== Fwends Reunited ===
On 1 January 2019, Channel 4 broadcast a 10th anniversary special entitled Fwends Reunited, hosted by Jimmy Carr. The four lead actors were present alongside supporting cast members; the title is a reference to a joke within the episode Will Gets a Girlfriend.

The special itself was a chat show with multiple segments including a quiz with four fans of the show, a history of the programme's production hosted by Neil Oliver, and awards based on the programme's best characters and moments. The special was met with a mostly negative reception from critics and fans alike; criticism from general viewers was primarily aimed at it being a simple chat show when a number of fans had mistakenly anticipated it as being a one-off special episode.

The Independent noted the "overwhelmingly negative responses" the special received, which included criticism from viewers towards the host Jimmy Carr, viewers claiming the four actors appeared clearly uninterested in the special, while there was also disappointment that they were not given a chance to speak more. Michael Hogan of The Daily Telegraph dubbed it a "shambolic mess that failed to do the show justice", although a more positive review came from Sean O'Grady of The Independent, who considered it "full of nostalgia". The extensive criticism led to James Buckley issuing an apology through Twitter.
