= The Inbetweeners Movie =

2011 film by Ben Palmer

- Theatrical release poster
- Directed by: Ben Palmer
- Written by: Damon Beesley; Iain Morris
- Based on: Characters by: Damon Beesley; and Iain Morris
- Produced by: Christopher Young
- Starring: Simon Bird; James Buckley; Blake Harrison; Joe Thomas
- Cinematography: Ben Wheeler
- Edited by: William Webb; Charlie Fawcett
- Music by: Mike Skinner
- Production companies: Film4; Bwark Productions; Young Films
- Distributed by: Entertainment Film Distributors
- Release dates: 17 August 2011 (United Kingdom); 7 September 2012 (United States)
- Running time: 97 minutes
- Country: United Kingdom
- Language: English
- Budget: £3.5 million
- Box office: £66.5 million

The Inbetweeners Movie (known simply as The Inbetweeners in North America) is a 2011 British coming-of-age teen adventure comedy film based on the E4 sitcom The Inbetweeners, written by series creators Damon Beesley and Iain Morris and directed by Ben Palmer.

The film follows the misadventures of a group of teenage friends on holiday in Malia after the end of their final year at school together, and was intended as an ending to the TV series. It stars Simon Bird, Joe Thomas, James Buckley and Blake Harrison. The Inbetweeners Movie was released on 17 August 2011 in the UK and Ireland by Entertainment Film Distributors, to favourable reviews, although its later release in the United States received mixed reviews from American critics. It was a considerable commercial success, setting the record for the biggest opening weekend for a comedy film in the UK. A sequel, The Inbetweeners 2, was released on 6 August 2014.

== Plot ==
Teenage friends Will McKenzie, Simon Cooper, Jay Cartwright, and Neil Sutherland finish their A-levels and prepare to leave Rudge Park Comprehensive. Jay's grandfather dies and Simon's girlfriend, Carli, breaks up with him.

To celebrate finishing school and to take Simon and Jay's minds off their grief, the boys take a holiday together to Malia, Crete. Arriving in Greece and being forced to spend the coach ride with chanting Burnley F.C. supporters, the boys find their accommodation to be a rundown hotel, and venture out to experience Malia's nightlife. In the town centre, the boys are tricked into visiting a deserted bar, and meet a group of four girls who are holidaying: Alison, Lucy, Lisa, and Jane. Will and Alison bond over their shared humour, Simon tells Lucy all about Carli to her frustration, and Neil and Lisa sit in awkward silence. To Jay's annoyance, Jane, the most overweight girl of the group, takes an interest in him.

While their initial meeting does not go smoothly, and Alison is already in a relationship with a local Greek waiter called Nicos, the girls arrange to meet the boys again at the girls' hotel the following day. Simon sees Carli, but is introduced to her new love interest, James, a cocky and arrogant club rep. Carli reveals that she is going to an all-day boat party later in the week, and Simon promises to meet her there. Neil reveals he chose Malia after Carli had mentioned she was going. Will and Simon return to the hotel while Jay and Neil stay out.

The next day, Jay wakes up hungover and Neil has slept with an older woman. The boys meet the girls at their hotel, but after several mishaps, they are kicked out. Jay and Simon get into an argument over Simon's obsession with Carli and they fight in the street. Desperate to buy a ticket for the boat party to try to reconcile with Carli, Simon naïvely "sells" all of his clothes to James without receiving payment. Jay reveals he had bought four boat party tickets, but tore up Simon and Will's in anger after the fight. Jay and Neil go to a club where they encounter James and his friends and unsuccessfully try to befriend them.

The four boys meet up and reconcile. The girls appear and grow closer to the boys, with the exception of Lisa when Neil disappears with the older woman. The group decide to go skinny dipping at the local beach. Jay becomes embarrassed when two men laugh at Jane for being overweight, and Jane leaves him. Will stumbles upon Nicos having sex with another woman and Alison leaves, distraught. In the sea, Lucy and Simon prepare to kiss, but Simon sees Carli and leaves Lucy alone. With the girls having left, the boys decide to visit various bars and clubs to get drunk.

On the day of the boat party, the group meet the girls again, where Alison reconciles with Will and gives him Nicos' ticket to join her on the boat. Simon apologises to Lucy and she offers him her ticket so that he can be with Carli. On board, Simon witnesses an argument between Carli and James. Carli kisses Simon, and he realises she is using him to make James jealous; seeing Carli for her true colours, Simon leaves her. Jay apologises to Jane and both start a relationship, with Will and Alison, and Neil and Lisa, doing the same. Jay and Jane encounter James who mocks Jane's weight and demands a banknote from Jay so that he can snort cocaine. Jay gets revenge on him by giving James a note concealed in his anus, leaving James with faeces on his nose. Simon decides to swim back to shore to Lucy but nearly drowns. As he is taken back to the beach via air ambulance, Lucy kisses him and they reconcile.

During the credits, the four boys and the girls spend the rest of their holiday together as couples. Upon their return to England, the group say goodbye at Gatwick Airport and the girls are introduced to the boys' parents.

== Cast ==
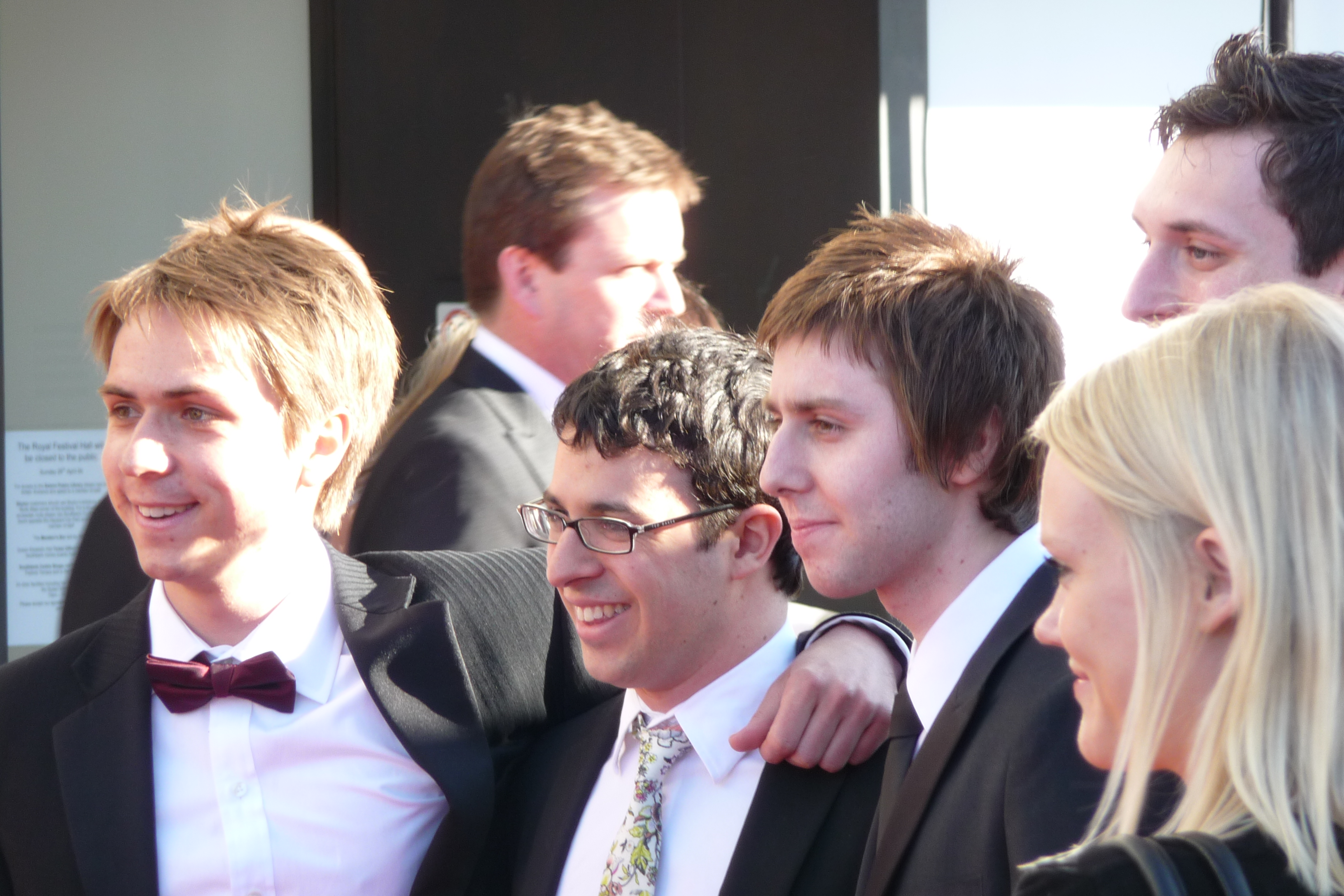
From left to right: Joe Thomas, Simon Bird, James Buckley and Blake Harrison

- Simon Bird as Will McKenzie
- James Buckley as Jay Cartwright
- Blake Harrison as Neil Sutherland
- Joe Thomas as Simon Cooper
- Emily Head as Carli D'Amato
- Laura Haddock as Alison
- Tamla Kari as Lucy
- Jessica Knappett as Lisa
- Lydia Rose Bewley as Jane
- Theo James as James
- Theo Barklem-Biggs as Richard
- Anthony Head as Mr McKenzie
- Belinda Stewart-Wilson as Polly McKenzie
- Martin Trenaman as Alan Cooper
- Robin Weaver as Pamela Cooper
- David Schaal as Terry Cartwright
- Victoria Willing as Mrs Cartwright
- Alex Macqueen as Kevin Sutherland
- Greg Davies as Mr Gilbert
- Henry Lloyd-Hughes as Mark Donovan
- Lauren O'Rourke as Nicole
- David Avery as Nicos
- Cush Jumbo as Jaime
- Storme Toolis as Wheelchair Girl
- Aimee Kelly as Party Girl (uncredited)

== Soundtrack ==
The film's soundtrack consisted of 27 songs with ten of them being written by Mike Skinner, who composed the film score. The rest of the album accompanied songs from Kesha, Calvin Harris, Yolanda Be Cool amongst others, and also included dialogues from the film. It was released through Sony Music on 22 August 2011.

== Production ==
A first draft for The Inbetweeners Movie was completed before the third series was even written. The story remained mostly similar besides small changes such as a scene in which Jay hires a motorbike, pretending he knows how to ride it, but failing by crashing into a wall. This scene was removed during the writing process for the third series as the pair needed a humorous way to open the episode and thought the motorbike scene would be better suited to the episode than the movie.

Principal photography took place in the United Kingdom (London, West Sussex), Magaluf, and Malia, Crete. A YouTube video shows the boys walking down the Malia Strip, past popular clubs 'Corkers', the strip club 'GoGo Lap Dancing Club' and 'Candy Club'. The interiors of the empty club where Neil shows off his dance moves were shot in Infernos night club on Clapham High Street, London.

== Release ==
=== Box office ===
On its first day of release, The Inbetweeners Movie grossed over £2.5 million in 409 cinemas. The film then went on to set a record for the most successful opening weekend ever achieved by a comedy film in the UK, overtaking Bridget Jones: The Edge of Reason and The Hangover Part II after earning £13.22 million, compared to second-place Rise of the Planet of the Apes which took £2.4 million. The Inbetweeners Movie was confirmed as having the biggest opening weekend for an independent British film. It retained its number 1 position in the UK film charts for four weeks before being overtaken by Tinker Tailor Soldier Spy on 20 September 2011, by which time The Inbetweeners Movie had grossed £41.8 million overall. The film saw a limited theatrical release in the United States on 7 September 2012, where it grossed $36,000 making its total box office revenue $88,025,781.

=== Critical reception ===
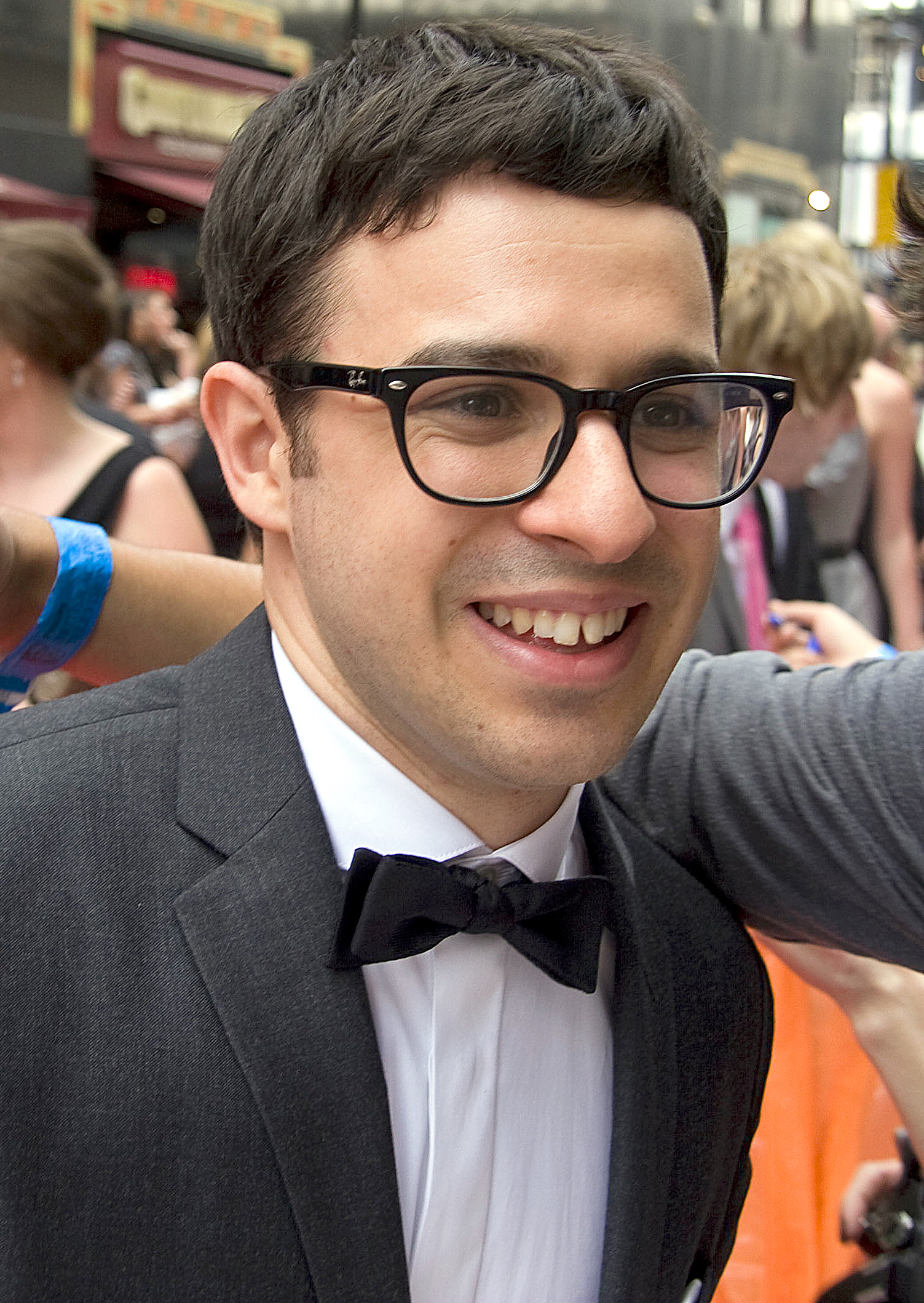
Simon Bird was praised by critics for his performance.

On review aggregator Rotten Tomatoes, the film has an approval rating of 54% based on 52 reviews, with an average rating of 5.3/10. The website's critical consensus reads, "It arguably plays most strongly to fans of the British series, but even viewers who have never seen The Inbetweeners on TV may find themselves won over by the film's surprisingly tender ribaldry." On Metacritic, the film has a weighted average score of 44 out of 100, based on 17 critics, indicating "mixed or average reviews". Ian Freer of Empire gave the film four stars out of five, observing that "Like any holiday, it is episodic and suffers from repetition but this is gag-for-gag the funniest film of the summer and a fitting end to a much-loved series." Steve Rose of The Guardian gave the film three stars out of five, giving particular praise to Simon Bird's performance and arguing that the film "updates the teen summer holiday formula surprisingly entertainingly, considering it doesn't subvert it one iota and the formula was already done previously with Holiday on the Buses and Kevin & Perry Go Large among others." Tim Robey of The Daily Telegraph also gave a positive assessment of the film, praising it as "an enormous hit, a Mamma Mia! for the Hangover demographic." Screen Daily, on the other hand, gave a mixed review, praising the performances of the main cast and proclaiming the film "Britain’s delayed riposte to American Pie", yet simultaneously arguing that it "can't quite shake off its TV roots, and plot-wise, this is nothing the Greek tourist board would want to advertise." Australian critic Margaret Pomeranz from At the Movies called the characters "gormless" and said, "I'm giving this one star really generously." She also said that the style of humour in the film was the reason that the British Empire collapsed.

=== Home media ===
On 12 December 2011, The Inbetweeners Movie was released on DVD and Blu-ray Disc in the UK by 4DVD, with the latter version sold as a triple pack containing both formats along with a digital copy of the film. Both versions include a number of special features, such as a making-of documentary, footage from the film's London premiere, various deleted scenes, cast commentaries and a blooper reel.

Following its appearance in UK stores, the DVD quickly became a major financial success. Within less than a week, the film became the third fastest-selling British home media release of 2011 after Harry Potter and the Deathly Hallows – Part 1 and Harry Potter and the Deathly Hallows – Part 2, with approximately 575,000 copies sold in the first day of its release. By 17 December, estimated sales reached one million, resulting in the film displacing the home media release of Paul as one of the five best-selling DVDs of the year in the UK.

In December 2014, parallel with the release of the film's sequel, a special edition with both films was released on DVD.

==== Extended version ====
The Blu-ray release also features an extended cut of the film that restores approximately four minutes of material omitted from the theatrical release, most notably an additional scene in which Will and Simon encounter a drunken Mr. Gilbert on a Malia stag weekend.

== Sequel ==
A sequel to the film, titled The Inbetweeners 2, was released in British and Irish cinemas on 6 August 2014. It is set in Australia.

== See also ==
- List of films based on British sitcoms
- List of 2011 box office number-one films in the United Kingdom
