= Simon Bird =

English actor and comedian (born 1984)

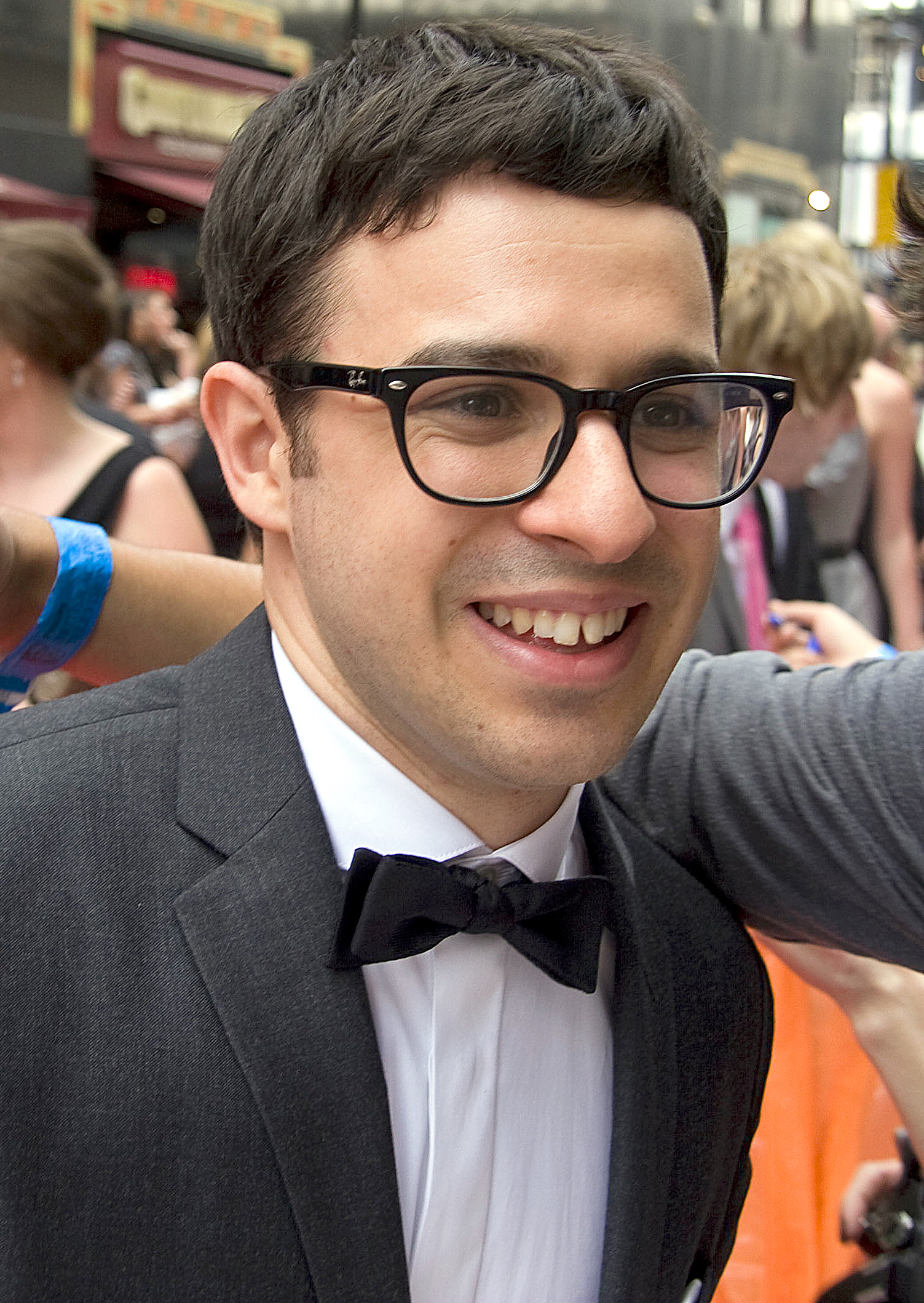
- Bird in 2010
- Born: Simon Antony Bird; 19 August 1984 (age 42); Guildford, Surrey, England
- Education: Queens' College, Cambridge; Birkbeck, University of London
- Occupations: Actor; comedian; director; producer
- Years active: 2008–present
- Spouse: Lisa Owens (m. 2012)
- Children: 2

Simon Antony Bird (born 19 August 1984) is an English comedian, actor, director and producer. He is best known for playing Will McKenzie in the E4 comedy series The Inbetweeners (2008–2010), as well as its two films (2011 and 2014), and Adam Goodman in the Channel 4 comedy series Friday Night Dinner (2011–2020). He is set to appear in Shawn Levy's Star Wars: Starfighter (2027).

== Early life ==
Bird was born in Guildford, Surrey, as the third of four children of University of Surrey professors Graham and Heather Bird.

Bird was educated at Cranmore School, West Horsley, the Royal Grammar School, Guildford, and Queens' College, Cambridge, where he read English. At Cambridge, Bird was the president of the Footlights, the university's sketch and theatrical group.

== Career ==
=== Early comedy career ===
While studying for a Master of Arts degree in cultural and critical studies at Birkbeck College, Bird set up the sketch comedy group "The House of Windsor" with former Footlights contemporaries Joe Thomas (who plays Simon Cooper in The Inbetweeners) and Jonny Sweet. They performed at the Edinburgh Festival in 2007 and in 2008 with a show called The Meeting, described as a site-specific comedy installation set in an actual boardroom. Bird and Thomas were also regulars on series 1 and 2 of The Weekly Show, a podcast for Channel 4 Radio (2006–07).

Bird performs stand-up comedy and took part in Chortle's national student comedy awards in 2005, 2006, 2007 and 2008, coming second in his final attempt. He was a finalist in 2006, and was disqualified for deliberately breaking the rules in 2007.

=== Breakthrough ===
In 2008, Bird was cast in E4's teen comedy The Inbetweeners as Will McKenzie along with Joe Thomas. He won the 2008 British Comedy Award for Best Male Newcomer and the 2009 British Comedy Award for Best Actor. He was also nominated for Best Comedy Performance at the 2008 Royal Television Society Awards, and Best Male Performance in a Comedy Programme at the 2010 BAFTA Television Awards.

=== Subsequent work ===
In 2010, Bird created a BBC Three comedy panel show The King Is Dead, in which a well-known person is hypothetically killed off and a panel of three personalities go head-to-head in a series of satirical quiz rounds and challenges in their bid to replace them. He hosted alongside Nick Mohammed and Katy Wix.

From 2011 to 2020 Bird appeared in 6 series of Friday Night Dinner, a single-camera comedy written by Robert Popper and made by Big Talk Productions. Like The Inbetweeners it was named Best Sitcom at the Rose D'Or Festival. In 2021 Channel 4 released Friday Night Dinner: 10 Years And A Lovely Bit Of Squirrel, an anniversary special celebrating a decade of the hit sitcom.

Bird returned to the character of Will McKenzie in The Inbetweeners Movie which was released on 17 August 2011. In 2014 he reprised the role in the second movie about the Inbetweeners, The Inbetweeners 2, which had the highest-grossing opening weekend of any film in the UK that year.

In 2013 Bird co-created, co-wrote, and co-starred in Chickens, a sitcom about three men who remain in England during World War I. It premiered on Sky1 in summer 2013 and was nominated for Best Comedy at the 2014 Broadcast Awards.

In 2017 he starred on the West End in The Philanthropist, directed by Simon Callow. In his review, The Telegraph's theatre critic Dominic Cavendish wrote "Callow has certainly struck gold with leading man Simon Bird...he delivers the goods by subtle, incremental means, the thespian equivalent of a 3D printer".

Bird's debut stand-up show Debrief, recorded in an empty theatre, was released on All4 in 2022 and described by comedy website Chortle as "more like an experimental art-house movie than a stand-up special".

Bird stars in a Channel 4 sitcom Everyone Else Burns, produced by Jax Media and NBC Universal, which was released in 2023. Time Magazine called it "the funniest network sitcom in ages".

=== Directing ===
In 2016, Bird directed his first short film Ernestine and Kit based on a story by Kevin Barry. It premiered at SXSW where it was nominated for the Grand Jury Award for Best Narrative Short. It was also nominated for Best Short Film at the 2016 Irish Television and Film Awards.

His debut feature film Days of Bagnold Summer, was released in 2020, backed by Creative England and the British Film Institute. It was described by Mark Kermode as "a gem of a movie...laugh-out-loud funny and piercingly poignant". It was nominated for the Variety Piazza Grande Award at the Locarno Film Festival and was named Best Feature at the LUCAS International Festival For Young Film Lovers. It currently has a 92% Fresh rating on Rotten Tomatoes.

For TV, Bird directed Series 3 of BAFTA-nominated mockumentary Pls Like and the first series of Rose D'Or-nominated sketch show Ellie & Natasia, described by The Times as "the funniest and most refreshing take on the format for years".

In 2023, Bird directed A24 series Such Brave Girls for the BBC, described by The Guardian as "hands down the funniest British comedy of the year".

=== Producing ===
In 2015 Bird and Jonny Sweet founded Guilty Party Pictures, an independent TV and film production company backed by StudioCanal. It produced a number of projects including God's Own County, nominated for Best Short-Form Comedy at the 2019 Broadcast Awards, How Europe Stole My Mum, described by The Guardian as "nothing short of a miracle", and How We Forgot To Save The Planet, which won the 2022 RTS Scotland Award for Best Comedy.

In 2022 it was announced that Bird and Sweet were setting up a new company, People Person Pictures, in partnership with BBC Studios. In 2023 they produced Netflix's A Whole Lifetime With Jamie Demetriou which went on to win the Rose D'Or for Best Comedy Entertainment. People Person Pictures was also named as a co-producing partner on Wicked Little Letters, a feature film starring Olivia Colman, Jessie Buckley and Timothy Spall, released in 2024.

== Personal life ==
In 2012, Bird married author Lisa Owens. They have two children.

Bird is a supporter of Crystal Palace Football Club.

== Filmography ==
=== Film ===
Year	Title	Role	Notes
2011	The Inbetweeners Movie	Will McKenzie	
2013	The Look of Love	Jonathan Hodge	
2013	The Harry Hill Movie	Ed	
2014	The Inbetweeners 2	Will McKenzie	
2016	Ernestine & Kit		Short film; director
2018	You, Me and Him	Ben Miller	
2019	Days of the Bagnold Summer		Director
2027	Star Wars: Starfighter †	TBA	Post-Production
TBA	The Inbetweeners 3 †	Will McKenzie	Filming

=== Television ===
Year	Title	Role	Notes
2008–2010	The Inbetweeners	Will McKenzie	18 episodes British Comedy Award Best Male Comedy Newcomer (2008); British Comedy Award Best TV Comedy Actor (2009); Nominated – BAFTA TV Award for Best Male Comedy Performance (2010)
2010	The King is Dead	Himself (Host)	7 episodes; also creator and writer
2011	Comedy Showcase	Cecil	Episode: "Chickens"
2011–2020	Friday Night Dinner	Adam Goodman	37 episodes
2013	Chickens	Cecil	6 episodes; also creator and writer
2015–2016	Drunk History: UK	D.I. Charles Buggy / Winston Churchill	2 episodes
2019	The Inbetweeners: Fwends Reunited	Himself	1 episode (special)
2020–2021	Sandylands	Nathan Wild	6 episodes
2021	Simon Bird: Debrief	Self, Host/Presenter	
2023–2024	Everyone Else Burns	David Lewis	Lead role, also an uncredited executive producer
2023–present	Such Brave Girls		Director, 12 episodes
2026	Steal	Oliver Davies	2 episodes
