= Blake Harrison =

British actor (born 1985)

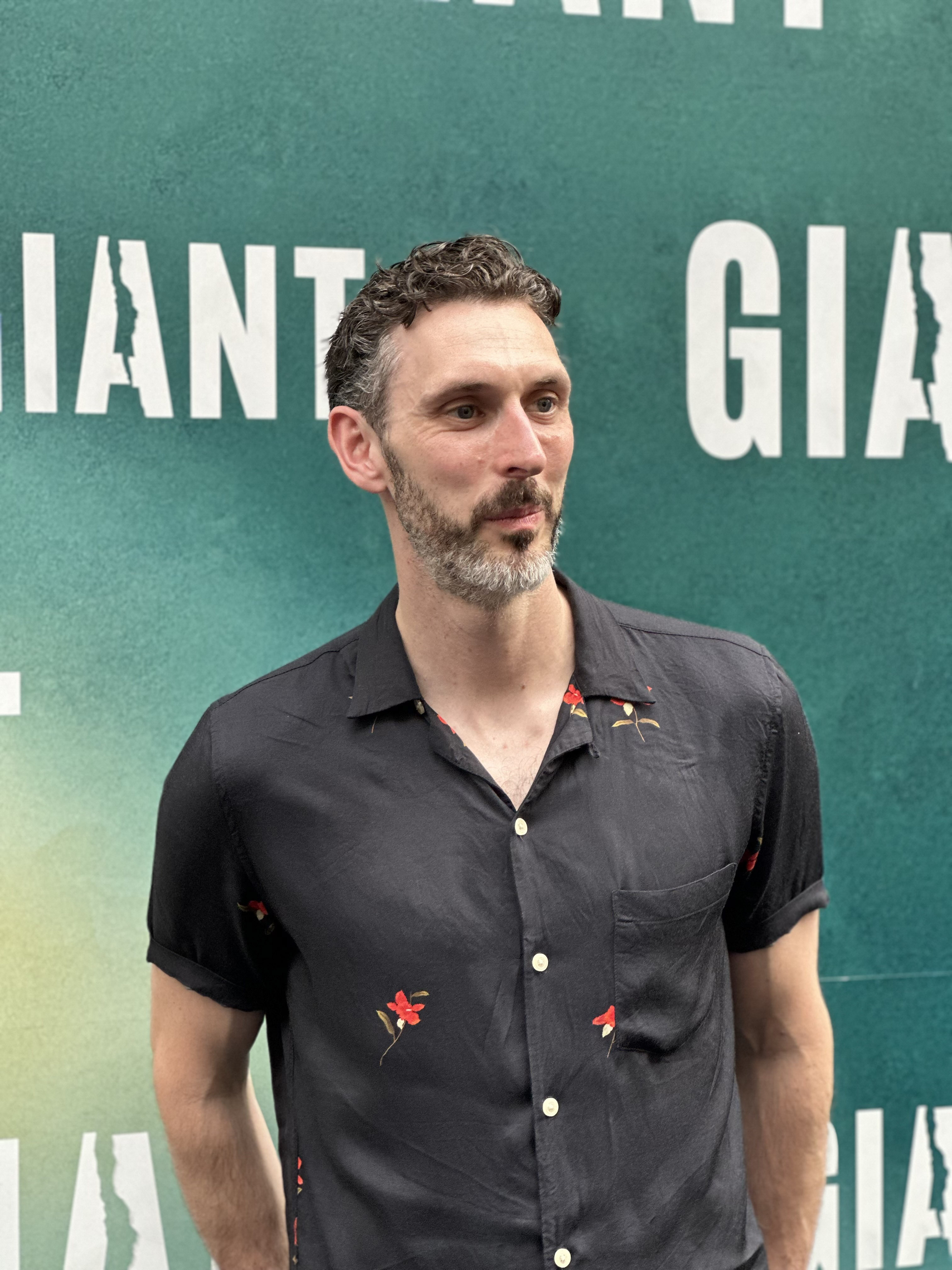
- Harrison in 2025
- Born: Peckham, London, England
- Occupations: Actor, comedian, dancer
- Years active: 2001–present
- Spouse: Kerry Ann Lynch (m. 2016)
- Children: 2

Blake Keenan Harrison is an English actor. He is best known for playing Neil Sutherland in the E4 comedy The Inbetweeners (2008–2010), as well as its two films (2011 and 2014), and more recently as 'Medium' Dan, in the ITV sitcom Kate & Koji (2020–2022).

== Career ==
Harrison starred in three series and two subsequent films of the multi-award-winning comedy The Inbetweeners. Harrison's other television work includes the BBC Three comedies Way to Go and Him & Her, and Comedy Central's Big Bad World, The Bleak Old Shop of Stuff, and The Bill. Harrison also starred in all three seasons of The Increasingly Poor Decisions of Todd Margaret, created by David Cross.

His theatre work includes End of the Pier at the Park Theatre in 2018, Step 9 of 12 at the Trafalgar Studios, London in 2012 and The Accidental Lives of Memories at the White Bear Theatre. His film work includes Keeping Rosy with Maxine Peake, Madness in the Method and Re-Uniting the Rubins with Timothy Spall; he also starred in Her Eyes Met With Mine, a short film by Slightly Ajar Productions.

In 2014, he played Alfie in the ITV sitcom Edge of Heaven. Harrison also provided the voice of Scoop in the British and American versions of the 2015 reboot of the British children's TV series Bob the Builder. He played the part of Private Pike in the 2016 film remake of Dad's Army. In 2018, he directed the award-winning short film Hooves of Clay, in which he also starred alongside Rebecca Humphries. Later he played Andrew Newton in A Very English Scandal.

In 2020, he was cast as 'Medium' Dan in the ITV sitcom Kate & Koji.

== Personal life ==
Harrison is married to Kerry Ann Lynch. They live in Kent and have two children. Harrison is a fan of Millwall F.C. He attended Bacon's College in Rotherhithe, south London.

In 2018, Harrison scored the winning penalty goal in the charitable event Soccer Aid.

== Filmography ==
=== Film ===
Year	Title	Role	Notes
2010	Reuniting the Rubins	Nick	
2011	Mancrush	Will	Short film
2011	The Inbetweeners Movie	Neil Sutherland	
2014	Keeping Rosy	Roger	
2014	Queen of Diamonds	Bench Guy	Short film
2014	The Inbetweeners 2	Neil Sutherland	
2016	Dad's Army	Private Pike	
2017	Bob the Builder: Mega Machines	Scoop (voice) (US & UK)	
2021	The Kindred	Greg Tullet	
2026	Fing!	Mr. Meek	
2026	Ink	Ray	

=== Television ===
Year	Title	Role	Notes
2008	The Bill	Pete Monks	2 episodes
2008–2010	The Inbetweeners	Neil Sutherland	18 episodes
2010–2011	Him & Her	Barney	2 episodes
2010–2012; 2016	The Increasingly Poor Decisions of Todd Margaret	Dave	17 episodes
2011	Day of the Match Aka Halftime	Danny	Pilot
2011–2012	White Van Man	Ricky	3 episodes
2012	Bleak Old Shop of Stuff	Smalcolm	3 episodes
2012	Comedy Showcase	Steve Lawson	Episode: "The Function Room"
2012	Them From That Thing	Various roles	2 episodes
2013	Way to Go	Scott	6 episodes
2013	Big Bad World	Ben Turnbull	8 episodes
2014	Edge of Heaven	Alfie	6 episodes
2014	Homeboys	David	Pilot
2015	Tripped	Danny	4 episodes
2015–2018	Bob the Builder	Scoop (voice)	Main role
2016	Houdini and Doyle	Lyman Biggs	Episode: "Spring-Heel'd Jack"
2017	Prime Suspect 1973	DS Spencer Gibbs	6 episodes
2017	Trust Me	Karl	4 episodes
2018	A Very English Scandal	Andrew Newton	2 episodes
2018	Agatha and the Truth of Murder	Travis Pickford	TV film
2019	Death in Paradise	Theo Roberts	Series 8 Episode 2
2019	The Inbetweeners: Fwends Reunited	Himself	1 episode (special)
2019–2023	World on Fire	Stan Raddings	8 episodes
2020	Jack and the Beanstalk: After Ever After	Dodgy Dave	TV film
2020–2021	The Great	Colonel Svenska	3 episodes
2020–2022	Kate & Koji	'Medium' Dan	
2021	Doctor Who	Namaca	1 episode
2022	The Great Celebrity Bake Off for SU2C	Himself	1 episode
2022	I Hate Suzie	Danny Carno	2 episodes
2023	Still Up	Veggie	
2024	Spread	Nelson	TV film
2025	Bookish	Sergeant Morris	5 episodes
2025	Maigret	Sergeant Joseph Torrence	Main role
2026	It Gets Worse	Roger	4 episodes
