= Damon Beesley =

British screenwriter

Damon Beesley (born 28 November 1971) is an English writer and television producer, best known for his work on British comedy The Inbetweeners and New Zealand comedy Flight of the Conchords. He often works alongside his writing partner Iain Morris.

In 2017, a six-part comedy series, White Gold, aired on BBC Two in the UK which Beesley had directed, created and written.

== Filmography ==
- The Pilot Show (2004) (producer)
- Flight of the Conchords (2007–2009) (writer)
- The Inbetweeners (2008–2010) (producer; writer; creator)
- The Inbetweeners Movie (2011) (writer)
- The Inbetweeners 2 (2014) (director; writer)
- Siblings (2014) (executive producer)
- White Gold (2017–2019) (director; writer; creator)
- The First Team (2020) (director; writer; creator)
- The Inbetweeners 3 (TBA) (director; writer)

== Awards ==
- 2008 – Writers Guild of America Award Nomination, Comedy Series (Flight of the Conchords)
- 2008 – Writers Guild of America Award Nomination, New Series (Flight of the Conchords)
- 2008 – British Comedy Award Win, Best New TV Comedy (The Inbetweeners)
