= Tess Morris =

British screenwriter (born 1977)

Tessa Jo Morris (born April 1977) is a British screenwriter. She was named one of BAFTA's Breakthrough Brits of 2015 after her success writing the romantic comedy Man Up. She co-hosts the romantic-comedy focused podcast You Had Us At Hello, and has been referred to as a "key voice standing up for the romantic comedy genre".

== Early career ==
Morris was born and raised in Wandsworth, London.

She attended university in South London where she completed a TV and Film degree. In 1997, while she was still in university, Morris wrote a short film titled Beer Goggles. The short was directed by David Mackenzie as part of the Lloyds Bank/Channel Four Film Challenge. Her team's film won first place and was broadcast on Channel 4.

After university, Morris became a journalist for teen news publishers where she regularly interviewed the cast of Hollyoaks, a British soap opera. After hearing of scriptwriting job opportunities, Morris became a writer for Hollyoaks at the age of 23. She wrote 18 episodes over the following two years, gaining a reputation on the show for her comedic scripts.

Looking for work outside Hollyoaks, Morris wrote a pilot for a sitcom based on her relationship with her Jewish grandmother titled Granny and Annie, but had no luck in getting it made. However, this pilot did get Morris noticed by the UK production company DLT Entertainment, who then hired her to write for their sitcom, My Family. After writing for one season of My Family, Morris spent a few years writing several spec scripts with different co-writers but never managed to sell any of them.

== Later career and Man Up ==
After struggling to sell her TV spec scripts, Morris got a job as a script reader for the BFI and Film4. During this time, she co-produced a short film called Rise of the Appliances with producer Richard Holmes. Morris claims she began to miss screenwriting and, based on some of the BFI script submissions she deemed were bad, she decided she would be able to write her own feature script. After a break-up, Morris moved back in with her parents and promised them that if her feature script did not get picked up, she would find a "proper job". In 2008, she was chosen for the BFI/Skillset Think Shoot Distribute Scheme for emerging talent in the British film industry.

Morris came up with the premise for her feature, Man Up, when she was approached by a stranger at Waterloo Station who asked her if she was his blind date, which made her wonder what may have happened if she had lied and told him yes.

She began writing Man Up in January 2011. Her inspirations for this film were Nora Ephron, Woody Allen and Nancy Meyers. The films which inspired her the most are When Harry Met Sally, Moonstruck and As Good as it Gets. To help her build the cinematic structure, Morris read Billy Mernit's book, Writing for the Romantic Comedy. Morris finished the spec script in three months then submitted it to Big Talk Productions who optioned it.

Man Up was directed by Ben Palmer, and starred Simon Pegg and Lake Bell. It was released in May 2015.

Since the release of Man Up, Morris has continued to work with Big Talk. She is writing a romantic comedy for Big Talk and BBC Films as well as a TV pilot for Lucky Giant and NBC.

Morris and Mernit host the romantic comedy-focused podcast You Had Us At Hello.

From 2017 to 2018, she was a member of the writing staff for Hulu's comedy-drama series Casual.

== Filmography ==
Year	Title	Role	Notes
1997	Beer Goggles	Writer	Lloyds Bank Channel 4 Film Challenge
2002	Hollyoaks	Writer	
2005-2006	My Family	Script Associate	
2011	Rise of the Appliances	Producer	
2013	The Love Punch	Additional Writer	
2015	Man Up	Writer	
