= Blackborough, Devon =

Hamlet in Devon, England

Coordinates: 50.872°N 3.286°W

Blackborough
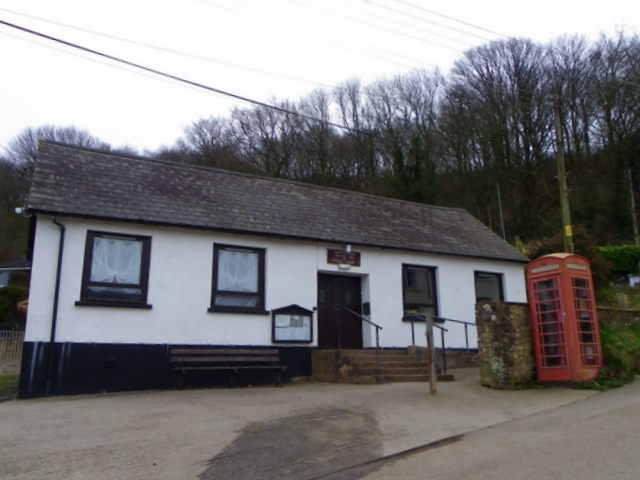
- Village hall, Blackborough

- Location within Devon
- OS grid reference: ST0960008825
- District: Mid Devon
- Shire county: Devon
- Region: South West
- Country: England
- Sovereign state: United Kingdom
- Post town: CULLOMPTON
- Postcode district: EX15
- Dialling code: 01884
- Police: Devon and Cornwall
- Fire: Devon and Somerset
- Ambulance: South Western
- UK Parliament: Honiton and Sidmouth

Blackborough is a hamlet and former manor in the parish of Kentisbeare, Devon, England. It is situated within the Mid Devon district. The nearest substantial town is Cullompton, approximately 4.7 miles (7.6 km) to the south-west. Within Blackborough is situated the large mansion of Blackborough House; also notable are Hayne Farm and the Old Smithy. The former neo-Gothic Early English style parish church of All Saints, built in 1838 by George Wyndham, 4th Earl of Egremont, lord of the manor, who also built Blackborough House was demolished in 1994, having become structurally unsafe. The churchyard however is still maintained and the ecclesiastical parish and parochial church council still exist.

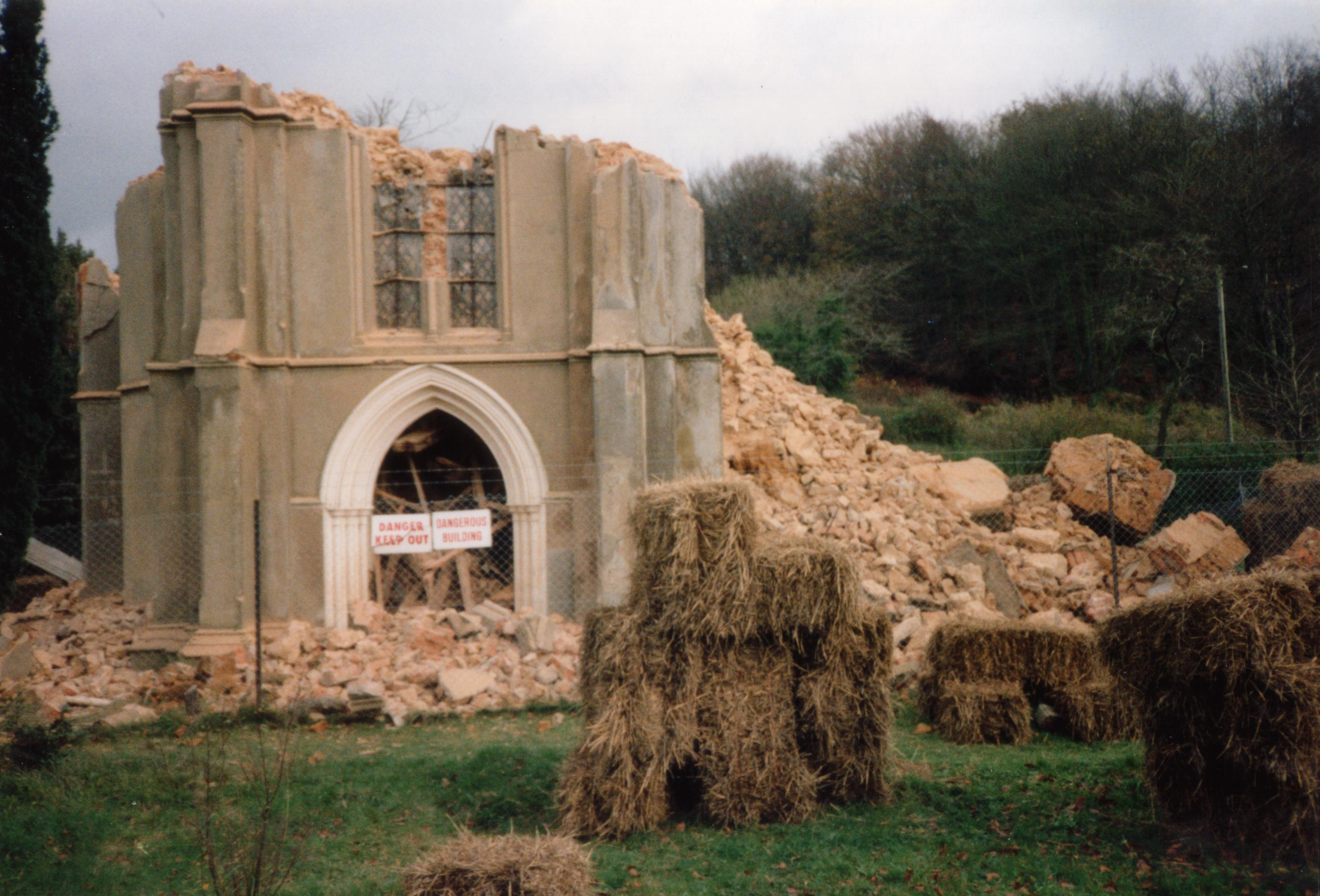
All Saints Church, Blackborough, during demolition (Nov 1994)

== Descent of the manor ==
=== Baldwin the Sheriff ===
The manor of Blacheberie is recorded in the Domesday Book of 1086 as the 101st of the 176 holdings of Baldwin the Sheriff, a Norman magnate, 1st feudal baron of Okehampton, seated at Okehampton Castle in Devon. Out of the 52 Devon Domesday Book tenants-in-chief of King William the Conqueror, his was the largest fiefdom in Devon. Before the Norman Conquest of 1066 it was held by the Anglo-Saxon Godric. Baldwin's tenant at Blacheberie was a certain William, possibly "William of Aller" (in the parish of Cullompton), who held seven manors from him (including Kentisbeare), all within the hundred of Silverton. The feudal barony of Okehampton later passed to the Courtenay family, Earls of Devon. Blackborough was donated by a later feudal baron of Okehampton to Forde Abbey which later transferred it to Dunkeswell Abbey, both in Devon.

=== de Bolegh ===
Arms of Boleche Boloch De Boleigh of Blackburgh Bolley: Argent, on a chevron sable between three torteaux three bezants

The earliest holder of Blackborough recorded by the Devon historian Sir William Pole (d.1635) is the family of de Bolegh (alias Bolley, Bolley, Bolhay, etc), the descent of which was as follows:

=== Cobham ===
Arms of Cobham of Blackborough: Gules, on a chevron or three eagles displayed sable

Sir John de Cobham married Amisia de Bolegh, heiress of Blackborough. He was a younger son of Baron Cobham of Cobham Hall in Kent. The arms of "Cobham of Blackburgh Bolhay" are recorded by Pole as Gules, on a chevron or three eagles displayed sable, which are a difference of the arms of the prominent family of Cobham of Cobham Hall in Kent, created Baron Cobham in 1313: Gules, on a chevron or three lions rampant sable, the heir of which family was Sir Thomas III Brooke (died 1439) of Holdich and Weycroft, Devon, grandson of Sir Thomas II Brooke (died 1418) of Holditch (whose monumental brass, together with that of his wife Joan Hanham, survives in Thorncombe Church), "by far the largest landowner in Somerset" and served 13 times as a Member of Parliament for Somerset. John Cobham had issue by Amisia de Bolegh as follows:

    - James Cobham, son and heir;
    - Isabel Cobham, wife of John Bampfield of Poltimore; the arms of Cobham of Blackborough are amongst the 30 quarterings above the effigy and monument to Sir Amyas Bampfylde (1564–1626) in All Saints Church, North Molton.
    - Elizabeth Cobham, wife of Sir Hugh Peverell, ancestress of Hastings, Earl of Huntington (via Hungerford);
    - Phillipa Cobham, wife of Nicholas Ingpen, ancestress (via Fitchet, Hill and Cheney) of Waldegrave of Suffolk;

James Cobham had descendants:

- John Cobham
- John Cobham
- Sir John Cobham of Blackborough, who left a daughter and heiress Elizabeth Cobham, wife of Walter Charleton, but died without issue. Charleton had conveyed the estate to Sir William Bonville of Shute, who after his death entered onto the estate, giving rise to a dispute with the families of Bampfield, Hungerford and Hill, right heirs of John Cobham and Amisia de Bolegh. The dispute was won by Bonville and thus Blackborough descended by the great heiress Cecily Bonville (1460-1529) to her grandson Henry Grey, 1st Duke of Suffolk, 3rd Marquess of Dorset (1517–1554). On the attainder of the latter in 1554, the estate escheated to the crown, and was sold to Sir John Wyndham, of Orchard Wyndham in Somerset.

== Blackborough House ==
Blackborough is home to the Grade II listed building Blackborough House. This was built in 1838 by George Wyndham, 4th Earl of Egremont. Originally designed as an Italianate palace, there were no funds to complete it on this scale, so it was constructed as two smaller, linked buildings. The house was variously used as a school, a religious institution for wayfarers and for training conscientious objectors for relief work As of 2016, the house is semi-derelict but has been purchased by a developer who plans to restore it and turn it into an events venue.
