= Paul (2011 film) =

2011 film by Greg Mottola

- British theatrical release poster
- Directed by: Greg Mottola
- Written by: Simon Pegg; Nick Frost
- Produced by: Nira Park; Tim Bevan; Eric Fellner
- Starring: Simon Pegg; Nick Frost; Jason Bateman; Kristen Wiig; Bill Hader; Blythe Danner; John Carroll Lynch; Sigourney Weaver; Seth Rogen
- Cinematography: Lawrence Sher
- Edited by: Chris Dickens
- Music by: David Arnold
- Production companies: Relativity Media; Working Title Films; Big Talk Pictures (Note: Relativity Media and Big Talk Pictures served as co-financers and co-production companies for Paul, while Working Title Films is credited as the production company, attributed to multiple sources:)
- Distributed by: Universal Pictures
- Release dates: 7 February 2011 (Empire Leicester Square); 14 February 2011 (United Kingdom); 18 March 2011 (United States)
- Running time: 104 minutes
- Countries: United Kingdom; United States (Note: Paul is considered an international co-production between the United States and the United Kingdom, attributed to multiple sources:)
- Language: English
- Budget: $40 million
- Box office: $98 million

Paul is a 2011 science fiction comedy road film directed by Greg Mottola and written by Simon Pegg and Nick Frost, who star alongside Jason Bateman, Kristen Wiig, Bill Hader, Blythe Danner, John Carroll Lynch, Sigourney Weaver, and Seth Rogen as the voice and motion capture of the title character. The film follows two science fiction geeks who come across an alien who is being pursued by Secret Service agents. Together, they help the alien escape so that he can return to his home planet.

The film is a parody of other science-fiction films, especially those of Steven Spielberg, as well as of science fiction fandom in general. The idea was conceived by Pegg and Frost in 2003, during production on Shaun of the Dead. Principal photography primarily took place in the New Mexico Desert and the Albuquerque Convention Center, and wrapped in September 2009. Double Negative provided the animation for Paul.

Paul had its world premiere at the Empire Leicester Square in London on 7 February 2011, and was theatrically released by Universal Pictures on 14 February in the United Kingdom, and on 18 March in the United States. It received mixed reviews from critics and was a box-office success, grossing $98 million worldwide on a $40 million budget.

== Plot ==
Best friends Graeme Willy and Clive Gollings are British comic book and sci-fi enthusiasts who travel to the United States to attend the annual San Diego Comic-Con. Clive is trying to write his own sci-fi book, and Graeme is illustrating Clive's book. In addition to going to the convention, they embark on a road trip through the Southwestern U.S. to visit UFO sites on a remote desert highway at night.

After an encounter with homophobic rednecks in a diner, they accidentally crash into the redneck's truck. They soon drive away, later watching a car driving erratically and crashing. Stopping to offer assistance to the driver, he is then revealed to be Paul, a grey alien (extraterrestrial being). Graeme agrees to give him a ride, despite Clive fainting and wetting his pants upon seeing him.

Later, Special Agent Zoil of the Secret Service arrives at the car-crash site, informing his unseen female superior, known as "the Big Guy," that he is closing in on Paul. She sends rookies Haggard and O'Reilly to assist. Clive remains paranoid over Paul's intentions, considering his appearance as evidence of a conspiracy. Paul explains the government fed his image to the public to keep them from panicking if anyone encounters his race.

Graeme, Clive, and Paul later camp at an RV park run by Christian fundamentalists, one-eyed Ruth Buggs and her father Moses. Clive and Paul argue, Clive citing Mac and Me. The next day, when Ruth sees Paul, she faints, so they take her with them. During an argument, Paul convinces Ruth to question her beliefs and cures her blind eye by transferring the condition onto himself and healing it immediately.

Stopping at a bar, Ruth calls her father, but Zoil intercepts the call. She is accosted by the rednecks and a bar fight ensues. They escape when Paul terrifies them into fainting. Later, at another RV park, Ruth is questioned by Agent Zoil, but plays dumb and escapes. Meanwhile, Haggard and O'Reilly have figured out about Paul. They confront Zoil, who orders them to return to base, but they go behind his back and try to catch the alien on their own.

The group soon arrives at the home of Tara, who rescued Paul when he crashed on Earth 60 years ago, accidentally killing her dog (hence Paul's name) in the crash (opening scene). As no one believed her story, she has spent her life as a pariah. Although angry at first, she forgives Paul and prepares to make tea for her visitors. Haggard, O'Reilly and Zoil arrive and surround the house. The group flees but O'Reilly shoots at them, igniting gas from Tara's stove and destroying her house with him inside. Haggard pursues and catches up to the RV but loses control and drives off a cliff. Zoil reassures the Big Guy that he will have Paul within the hour, but the Big Guy, who has grown tired of waiting, orders a "military response".

Paul, Graeme, Clive, Ruth and Tara arrive at Devils Tower National Monument, where they set off fireworks to signal Paul's mothership. A helicopter suddenly arrives with agents and the Big Guy. Zoil appears and initiates a stand-off, unexpectedly shooting the agents, before being wounded. He is revealed to be Paul's friend, attempting to aid his escape under the guise of capturing him. During the fight, Tara knocks out the Big Guy. Moses arrives unexpectedly and fires at Paul, but hits Graeme instead. Paul once again uses his healing powers, reviving Graeme in spite of the danger to himself, causing Moses to believe Paul to be a messiah.

Graeme and Ruth admit their feelings for each other and kiss, but the Big Guy regains consciousness and holds the group at gunpoint. Just as she is about to kill them, she is crushed by the landing transport ship. Paul says goodbye to his friends and offers Tara a chance to go with him, promising to give her a new life after ruining her childhood and accidentally killing her dog. The aliens go home as the remaining humans wave. Two years later, Graeme, Clive and Ruth are at another Comic-Con, where Graeme and Clive are promoting their new bestselling novel titled Paul.

== Cast ==
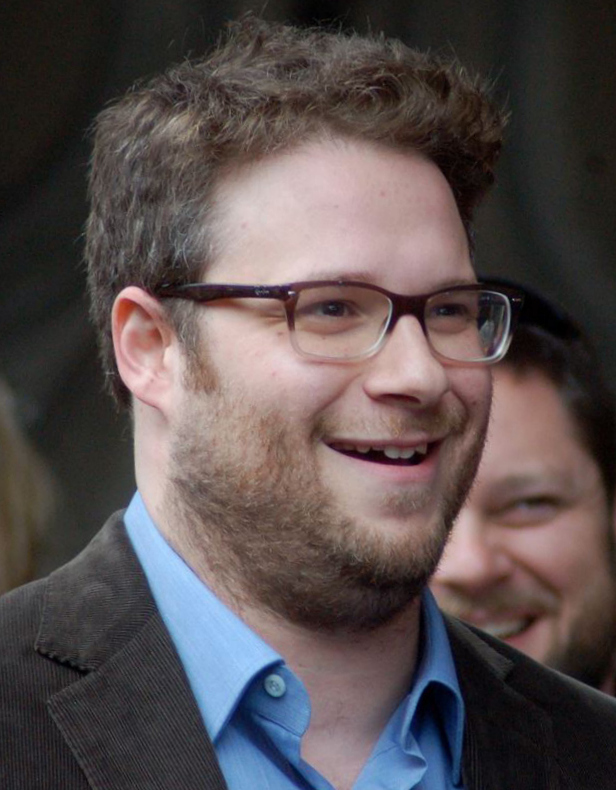
Seth Rogen (pictured in 2013) provided the voice work and motion capture for Paul the alien.

- Simon Pegg as Graeme Willy
- Nick Frost as Clive Gollings
- Seth Rogen as Paul (voice and motion capture)
- Jason Bateman as Special Agent Lorenzo Zoil. Describing his character as an "exaggerated nasty guy", Bateman based his portrayal of Zoil on Yaphet Kotto in Midnight Run and Tommy Lee Jones in The Fugitive. His name is a play-on of the film, Lorenzo's Oil (1992).
- Kristen Wiig as Ruth Buggs
- Bill Hader as Agent Haggard
- Blythe Danner as Tara Walton
  - Mia Stallard as Young Tara Walton
- Joe Lo Truglio as Agent O'Reilly
- John Carroll Lynch as Moses Buggs, Ruth's father
- Jane Lynch as Pat Stevens
- David Koechner as Gus, a redneck whom Graeme and Clive first encounter at the Little A'Le'Inn.
- Jesse Plemons as Jake, Gus's friend.
- Sigourney Weaver as "The Big Guy". In an interview with Graham Norton, Weaver stated: "It's a love letter to sci-fi fans. I jumped at the chance to be in it. To find a comedy that also pays homage to sci-fi is a dream come true."
- Syd Masters as himself, a singing cowboy on stage
- Jeffrey Tambor as Adam Shadowchild, a famous science fiction writer
- Steven Spielberg as himself (voice)

In an interview for the DVD release of Paul, Pegg and Frost said they made the film to demonstrate their love for Steven Spielberg's films Close Encounters of the Third Kind and E.T. the Extra-Terrestrial, as well as their favourite science-fiction films. After they mentioned the project to Spielberg, he suggested he might make a cameo appearance, and a scene was added to include him as a voice on a speakerphone in 1980 discussing ideas with Paul for his soon-to-become box office hit E.T. the Extra-Terrestrial. According to Robert Kirkman, he, along with Invincible co-creator Cory Walker and Invincible artist Ryan Ottley, had a cameo in the film as the Big Guy's henchmen.

== Production ==
The idea for Paul came from Simon Pegg and Nick Frost in 2003, while they were filming Shaun of the Dead. To help with the script, Pegg and Frost went on their own road trip across America and used ideas from it to add to the script. According to Greg Mottola, the film was given the green light shortly before the onset of the Great Recession; if it had been delayed, "they probably wouldn't have made the movie." The budget for the film was around US$40 million. Principal photography, including 50 days in the New Mexico desert, wrapped on 9 September 2009, with additional scenes filmed in July 2010 at the Albuquerque Convention Center, which was designed to look like the 2010 San Diego Comic-Con. During filming, Joe Lo Truglio was a stand-in for the character Paul, who was created with CGI, although Seth Rogen, the voice of Paul, did some motion capture in pre- and post-production. The animation for Paul was handled by Double Negative, who also aided in the production of other visual effects work, including "Paul's invisibility, the mind-meld sequences, the digital bird and a multitude of greenscreen driving shots." The cover art for the fictional comic book Encounter Briefs was drawn by alternative comics artist Daniel Clowes.

== Release ==
A teaser trailer for the film was released on 18 October 2010. The film had its world premiere in London on 7 February 2011, and was released the following week in the United Kingdom, on 14 February, by Universal Pictures. It later was released in the United States on 18 March. In the United Kingdom, Paul received a rating of 15 by the British Board of Film Classification, whereas in the United States, it received a rating of R by the Motion Picture Association of America, for "language including sexual references, and some drug use."

=== Home media ===
Paul was released on DVD and Blu-ray in the United Kingdom on 13 June 2011 and was released in North America on 9 August 2011, by Universal Studios Home Entertainment. Three versions of the film were made. The DVD release features an audio commentary with director Greg Mottola, stars Simon Pegg, Nick Frost, Bill Hader, and producer Nira Park; two featurettes; "Simon's Silly Faces"; photo galleries; storyboards and posters; and a blooper reel. The United States Blu-ray release features all the DVD supplements with nine more featurettes and a digital copy. The film was later released on 4K by Kino Lorber on 18 November 2025.

== Reception ==
=== Box office ===
Paul grossed $37.4 million in the United States and Canada, and $60.6 million in other territories, for a worldwide total of $98 million.

In North America, Paul opened on March 18, 2011, alongside Limitless and The Lincoln Lawyer. It went on to debut to $13 million, finishing fifth at the box office.

=== Critical response ===
On review aggregator Rotten Tomatoes, the film holds an approval rating of 70% based on 205 reviews. The website's critical consensus reads, "It doesn't measure up to Pegg and Frost's best work, but Paul is an amiably entertaining — albeit uneven — road trip comedy with an intergalactic twist." On Metacritic, the film received a score of 57 based on 37 reviews, indicating "mixed or average reviews". Audiences polled by CinemaScore gave the film an average grade of "B+" on an A+ to F scale.

Empire rated the film "excellent" (four stars out of five), stating, "Broader and more accessible than either Shaun of the Dead or Hot Fuzz, Paul is pure Pegg and Frost — clever, cheeky, and very, very funny. You'll never look at E.T. in the same way again." SFX also gives the film four stars out of five, saying, "the film veers dangerously close to alienating (no pun intended) all but its geek core audience, [though] the more obvious concessions to a mainstream crowd [are] never enough to derail the film's laugh-a-minute ride"; SFX also calls it a "triumph of visual effects, convincing characterisation and bad taste humour." Peter Bradshaw gave the film two stars out of five and called it a "goofy, amiable piece of silliness" exhibiting "self-indulgence" and possessing a "distinct shortage of real gags". On the same scale Nigel Andrews gave the film only one star, calling it a "faltering extraterrestrial knockabout". The Independent grades the film two stars out of five, saying, "Pegg is likeable as usual, Frost more doltish than usual, and Kristen Wiig an appealing convert from Bible thumper to ladette", and notes that "from time to time, clever ideas rear their heads – like the idea that 'Paul' has been the brains behind all science-fiction and UFO initiatives for the last 30 years, including Close Encounters and The X-Files – but they soon return to the film's default setting of laddish japes and a conviction that the word 'cocksucker' will always get a laugh."

IGN provided Paul with three reviews. The first gave the film three stars, stating, "Simon Pegg and Nick Frost send up everything from Star Wars to E.T. in this sci-fi comedy ... As with Pegg and Frost's previous films together, it's derivative stuff, the plot similar to countless sci-fi flicks of the past; paying homage to the good and gently ribbing the bad." Less excited was their review for the British Blu-ray version, which said, "But unlike previous Pegg and Frost collaborations – Shaun of the Dead and Hot Fuzz – Paul does not generously reward repeat viewing. That's not to say it's a bad film at all; it has a strong central premise, which carries much of the film, loveable central characters, the odd neat idea (it turns out that Paul inspired all major works of SF post-1950, from Close Encounters to The X-Files, and has a direct line to Steven Spielberg), and a couple of genuine laughs, but it never feels more than a rough sketch of a bigger, much funnier movie." In a second review for the American Blu-ray version, IGN compared the movie with Galaxy Quest and wrote that it is "richly layered with clever homage, a refreshingly original alien hero, delightfully entertaining characters and great performances from our leads and their supporting players."

Upon its release in the United States, Roger Ebert gave Paul a mixed review of two and a half stars out of four, saying it is a "movie that teeters on the edge of being really pretty good and loses its way. I'm not sure quite what goes wrong, but you can see that it might have gone right." Manohla Dargis of The New York Times wrote: "As genial, foolish and demographically engineered as it sounds (hailing all fan boys and girls), Paul is at once a buddy flick and a classic American road movie of self (and other) discovery, interspersed with buckets of expletives and some startling (especially for a big-studio release) pokes at Christian fundamentalism ... The movie has its attractions, notably Mr. Pegg and Mr. Frost (and of course Mr. Bateman), whose ductile, (noncomputer) animated and open faces were made for comedy ... Paul proves the weak link. One problem is that Mr. Rogen, however comically inclined, has become overexposed, and there's just something too familiar and predictable about this voice coming out of that body. Yet while Paul seems great conceptually, he's not particularly interesting or surprising, despite a funny recap of what he's been doing on his time on Earth. With his vibe and vocabulary, shorts and weed, juvenilia and sentimentality, Paul turns out to be not much different from a lot of guys who have wreaked comedy havoc on American screens lately, even if this one only wants to beam up, not knock up."

=== Accolades ===
At the 2011 National Movie Awards, Paul received both nominations for Performance of the Year (Frost and Pegg) and won Best Comedy; this same category was nominated at the St. Louis Gateway Film Critics Association Awards 2011. The film was nominated in two categories at the 2011 Golden Trailer Awards: "Trailer" (Workshop Creative) for Best Comedy and "Dessert" (The Ant Farm) for Best Comedy TV Spot. Character animators David Lowry and Mike Hull were nominated for Outstanding Achievement for Character Animation in a Live Action Production at the 39th Annie Awards. Paul's character design was nominated for Outstanding Animated Character in a Live Action Feature Motion Picture at the 10th Visual Effects Society Awards.

== Soundtrack ==
Paul: Music from the Original Motion Picture was released on 21 February 2011 by Universal Music. It intersperses David Arnold's score with the rock songs appearing in the film.

All tracks are written by David Arnold, except as noted.

No.	Title	Writer(s)	Performer(s)	Length
1.	"Paul Opening Title"		David Arnold	1:56
2.	"Another Girl, Another Planet" (from The Only Ones, 1978)	Peter Perrett	The Only Ones	3:00
3.	"Road Trip Number 1"		David Arnold	0:57
4.	"Just the Two of Us"	Withers, Ralph MacDonald, William Salter	Bill Withers and Grover Washington, Jr.	3:57
5.	"Passport"		David Arnold	1:18
6.	"Road Trip Number 2"		David Arnold	1:34
7.	"Flying Saucers Rock 'N' Roll" (single, 1957)	Harold Ray Scott	Billy Lee Riley	2:02
8.	"Window Shopping"		David Arnold	0:51
9.	"Hello It's Me" (from Something/Anything?, 1972)	Rundgren	Todd Rundgren	4:20
10.	"End of the Road Trip"		David Arnold	1:38
11.	"Dancing in the Moonlight" (from Dancing In The Moonlight, 1973)	Sherman Kelly	King Harvest	2:56
12.	"Campfire Confession"		David Arnold	1:24
13.	"Got to Give It Up" (from Live at the London Palladium, 1977)	Gaye	Marvin Gaye	6:01
14.	"A Little Talk with Paul"		David Arnold	1:21
15.	"I Chase the Devil" (from War Ina Babylon, 1976)	Lee Perry, Romeo	Max Romeo	3:22
16.	"Chase"		David Arnold	1:18
17.	"Cantina Band"	John Williams	Syd Masters & The Swing Riders	3:42
18.	"You Gotta Try"		David Arnold	2:51
19.	"1st Contact"		David Arnold	1:17
20.	"Planet Claire" (from The B-52's, 1979)	Fred Schneider, Keith Strickland, Henry Mancini	The B-52's	4:33
21.	"Goodbye (It's a Little Awkward)"		David Arnold	4:42
22.	"All Over the World" (from Xanadu, 1980)	Jeff Lynne	Electric Light Orchestra	4:05

== Future ==
Pegg has stated that he would like to do a sequel to Paul, titled Pauls, but that the time and expense it would take means it is unlikely to happen unless costs decrease. On August 13, 2021, during a live stream on Instagram, Pegg stated that there was 'no chance' of a sequel.

== See also ==
- List of British films of 2011
- List of American films of 2011
- List of media set in San Diego
