= Kentisbeare =

Village in Devon, England

Coordinates: 50.865°N 3.325°W

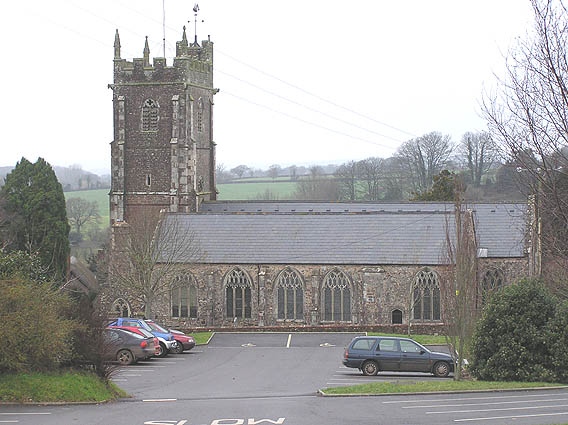
- Kentisbeare parish church

- Location within Devon
- Population: 1,000 (2021 Census)
- OS grid reference: ST 069 082
- District: Mid Devon
- Shire county: Devon
- Region: South West
- Country: England
- Sovereign state: United Kingdom
- Post town: CULLOMPTON
- Postcode district: EX15
- Dialling code: 01884
- Police: Devon and Cornwall
- Fire: Devon and Somerset
- Ambulance: South Western
- UK Parliament: Honiton and Sidmouth

Kentisbeare is a village and civil parish in the Mid Devon district of Devon, England. Its nearest town is Cullompton. It has a population of 1,000.

== Descent of the manor ==
In the 17th century the manor of Kentisbeare was owned by Sir John Wyndham (1558–1645) of Orchard Wyndham, Somerset. In 1810 it was owned by his descendant Hon. Percy Charles Wyndham (1757–1833), MP, 2nd son of Charles Wyndham, 2nd Earl of Egremont, who also owned the manor of Blackborough where in 1838 George Wyndham, 4th Earl of Egremont (d.1845) built a palatial villa, known as Blackborough House. The 4th Earl built Kentisbeare House in 1841, to the designs of J. T. Knowles, for his relative the rector of Kentisbeare.

== Historic estates ==
=== Wood ===
The estate of Wood was held by the Whiting family between the reigns of King Edward III (1327–1377) and King Henry VIII (1509–1547). The last in the male line was John Whitinge (d.1529), a member of the Merchant Venturers, whose elaborately panelled chest tomb survives in Kentisbeare Church, in the chapel at the east end of the south aisle, which he built. The two monumental brasses which were originally affixed to the monument are now lost, but his armorials survive sculpted on the wooden screen. John Whiting left four daughters and co-heiresses:

- Whiting daughter, married to a FitzJames.
- Agnes Whiting, 2nd daughter, who married Henry I Walrond (d.1550), of Bradfield, Uffculme. Wood passed to the Walrond family, and appears to have been used as a secondary residence and dower house as several members of the family were subsequently buried in Kentisbeare Church.
- Whiting daughter married to an Ashford.
- Whiting daughter married to a Keynes.

In 1810 Wood belonged to Samuel Southwood, Esq.

== Betty Limpany ==
In 1799, Betty Limpany was executed in Exeter for burning down the house of her master, William Leech of Kentisbeare.

== Sources ==
- Vivian, Lt.Col. J.L., (Ed.) The Visitations of the County of Devon: Comprising the Heralds' Visitations of 1531, 1564 & 1620, Exeter, 1895, pp. 768–770, pedigree of Walrond
- Risdon, Tristram (d.1640), Survey of Devon, 1810 edition, p. 89, Kentisbeare
