= Nira Park =

British film producer

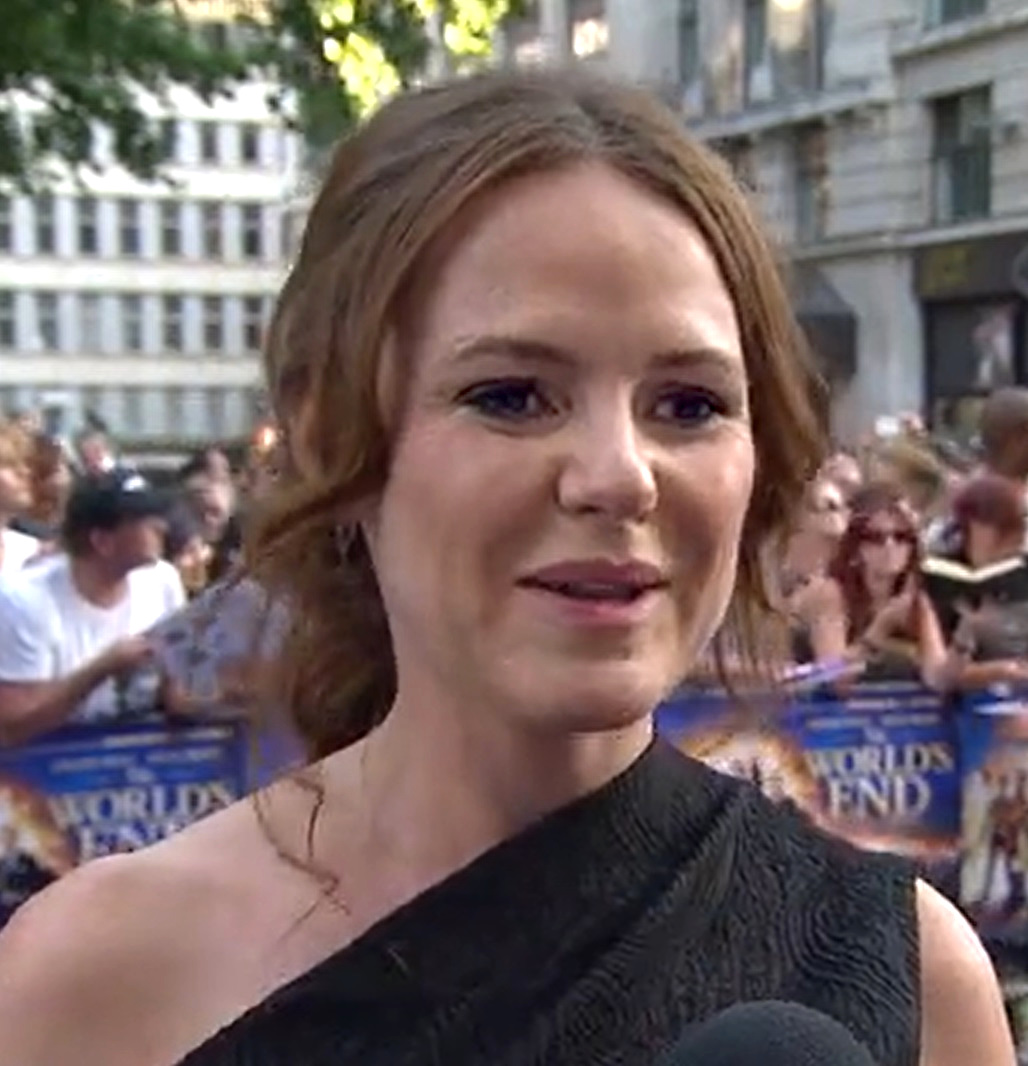
- Park at The World's End Premiere, Leicester Square, 10 July 2013
- Born: Nira Louise Park
- Occupations: Film producer, television producer, founder of Big Talk Productions and Complete Fiction Pictures
- Years active: 1990–present
- Known for: Shaun of the Dead; Hot Fuzz; Scott Pilgrim vs. the World; Paul; Attack the Block; In Fear; The World's End; Man Up; Baby Driver; The Kid Who Would Be King; Rebecca; The Sparks Brothers; Last Night in Soho
- Television: Spaced; Black Books; Him and Her; Friday Night Dinner
- Spouse: Keith Allen (m. 1997, divorced)
- Website: www.completefiction.com

Nira Louise Park is a British television and film producer.

== Career ==
Park founded award-winning UK film and television production company Big Talk in 1995. She left the company in July 2018 to launch a new production company, Complete Fiction Pictures, with Edgar Wright, Joe Cornish and Rachael Prior.

Park is best known for her collaborations with Edgar Wright, having produced all of his work over the past two decades; their partnership began with the award-winning television series Spaced. This also marked the beginning of their long-standing collaborations with Simon Pegg and Nick Frost, which continued with the cult comedy Shaun of the Dead for which Park received a BAFTA Outstanding Debut Award nomination. The film was the first instalment of Wright's iconic Three Flavours Cornetto trilogy, all starring Pegg and Frost. Park went on to produce Wright's Scott Pilgrim vs. the World and Baby Driver.

Park has also worked closely with Joe Cornish over the years, their relationship beginning with the SXSW Audience Award-winning and BAFTA Outstanding Debut-nominated feature Attack the Block and most recently his supernatural detective thriller Lockwood & Co.. In addition to her work with Wright and Cornish, Nira has produced: Greg Mottola’s Paul, written by and starring Pegg and Frost; Ben Wheatley’s Cannes-premiered black-comedy Sightseers; Jeremy Lovering's critically acclaimed psychological horror In Fear, which premiered at Sundance; Cuban Fury, starring Nick Frost, Chris O’Dowd and Rashida Jones; Man Up, starring Simon Pegg alongside Lake Bell; and Sacha Baron Cohen’s action comedy Grimsby.

For television, she has produced three series of the double BAFTA award-winning sitcom Black Books, Free Agents, and was an executive producer on Friday Night Dinner and the BAFTA award-winning Him and Her.

In 2020, Park produced Ben Wheatley's Rebecca, starring Lily James, Armie Hammer and Kristin Scott Thomas for Working Title Films and Netflix. In 2021, she produced Edgar Wright's The Sparks Brothers, a feature documentary about the band Sparks, with Complete Fiction and their Baby Driver partner MRC. She also produced Edgar Wright's 2021 film Last Night in Soho with Complete Fiction and Working Title for Focus Features and Film4.

== Personal life ==
Theo Park is the sister of Nira Park.
