= Douglas Is Cancelled =

British television series

- Genre: Comedy-drama
- Created by: Steven Moffat
- Written by: Steven Moffat
- Directed by: Ben Palmer
- Starring: Hugh Bonneville; Karen Gillan; Alex Kingston; Nick Mohammed; Simon Russell Beale; Ben Miles; Madeleine Power
- Country of origin: United Kingdom
- Original language: English
- No. of series: 1
- No. of episodes: 4

Production
- Executive producers: Steven Moffat; Ben Palmer; Sue Vertue
- Producer: Lawrence Till
- Running time: 40-45 minutes
- Production company: Hartswood Films

Original release
- Network: ITV1
- Release: 27 June – 18 July 2024

Douglas Is Cancelled is a 2024 British television four-part comedy-drama created and written by Steven Moffat, directed by Ben Palmer and starring Hugh Bonneville, Karen Gillan and Alex Kingston. It was first aired weekly from 27 June 2024 on ITV1, with all four episodes made immediately available on ITVX on that date.

== Premise ==
Douglas Bellowes is a widely respected television news anchor, whose life begins to unravel when he is accused on social media of making a sexist joke at a wedding.

== Cast ==
- Hugh Bonneville as Douglas Bellowes, lead presenter for Live at Six news
- Karen Gillan as Madeline Crow, Douglas's co-presenter
- Alex Kingston as Sheila Bellowes, Douglas’s wife and a newspaper editor
- Nick Mohammed as Morgan, a comedy writer working for Live at Six
- Simon Russell Beale as Bently, Douglas's agent
- Ben Miles as Toby, Douglas's producer
- Madeleine Power as Claudia Bellowes, Douglas's daughter and political activist
- Joe Wilkinson as Tom, Toby's driver
- Kirsty Wark as Interviewer

== Episodes ==
No.	Episode	Directed by	Written by	Original release date
1	Episode 1	Ben Palmer	Steven Moffat	27 June 2024
2	Episode 2	Ben Palmer	Steven Moffat	4 July 2024
3	Episode 3	Ben Palmer	Steven Moffat	11 July 2024
4	Episode 4	Ben Palmer	Steven Moffat	18 July 2024

== Production ==
The series was written by Steven Moffat, directed by Ben Palmer, and produced by Hartswood Films in association with SkyShowtime and BBC Studios Distribution. Moffat also serves as executive producer alongside his wife Sue Vertue, with Lawrence Till as producer. Moffat described writing the script "in secret".

=== Filming ===
Production started on the four-part series in London in November 2023.

=== Casting ===
In November 2023, Hugh Bonneville, Karen Gillan, Alex Kingston, Ben Miles, Simon Russell Beale and Nick Mohammed were confirmed in the cast.

== Broadcast ==
The entire series has been available in the UK on ITVX since 27 June 2024, and was aired weekly on ITV1 from 27 June to 18 July 2024. In Australia, it is available to stream on ABC iview.

== Critical reception ==
On Rotten Tomatoes, 77% of 26 reviews are positive for the miniseries. The critics' consensus on the website states: "While this satire's scattershot aim at thorny topics doesn't hit every target, Hugh Bonneville's expertly hapless performance makes it a squirmy pleasure to watch." On Metacritic, it received an average score of 61 based on 13 critics reviews.

Amber Dowling of The Globe and Mail writes that the miniseries "makes the case for character studies, deeply examining characters as they are in the moment, and proves that, sometimes, it's more compelling to present people at their core and allow viewers to draw their own conclusions". In The Times, Carol Midgley describes the "claustrophobic intensity" of the third episode as "excruciating. Mostly in a good way".

Writing for The A.V. Club, Tim Lowery stated that the "tonal shift […] almost lands. But the workplace-comedy trappings and quips that can make this watch enjoyable […] often feel at odds with the serious things Moffat is trying to say and portray. And it’s hard not to walk away thinking that another British miniseries, last year’s A Very Royal Scandal […] not only got there first—but did it better."

Gillan was nominated for Best Actress (film and television) at the 2025 British Academy Scotland Awards.
