= Big Talk Studios =

British film and TV production company

Big Talk Studios Limited
- Formerly: 26 Nassau Street Limited (Apr–Aug 2008); Big Talk Productions Limited (2008–2023)
- Company type: Subsidiary
- Industry: Film; Television
- Genre: Comedy
- Founded: 11 February 1994; 32 years ago
- Founder: Nira Park
- Headquarters: United Kingdom
- Parent: ITV Studios (2013–present)
- Website: bigtalkstudios.com

Big Talk Studios Limited (formerly known as 26 Nassau Street Limited and Big Talk Productions Limited) is a British film and television production company founded by Nira Park in 1994. Big Talk was acquired by ITV Studios in 2013.

== Film ==
=== Filmography ===
==== Released ====
Year	Title	Director	Co-production with	Distributor
2004	Shaun of the Dead	Edgar Wright	Universal Pictures; StudioCanal; Working Title Films; WT² Productions	Rogue Pictures (United States); Universal Pictures (International); Mars Distribution (France)
2007	Hot Fuzz	Edgar Wright	StudioCanal; Working Title Films	Rogue Pictures (United States); Universal Pictures (International); Mars Distribution (France)
2010	Scott Pilgrim vs. the World	Edgar Wright	Universal Pictures; Marc Platt Productions; Closed on Mondays Entertainment; Dentsu	Universal Pictures
2011	Paul	Greg Mottola	Universal Pictures; Relativity Media; Working Title Films	Universal Pictures
2011	Attack the Block	Joe Cornish	StudioCanal; Film4; UK Film Council	Optimum Releasing
2012	Sightseers	Ben Wheatley	Film4; British Film Institute; Rook Films	StudioCanal
2013	The World's End	Edgar Wright	Relativity Media; Working Title Films; Dentsu	Focus Features (United States); Universal Pictures (International)
2013	In Fear	Jeremy Lovering	—N/a	StudioCanal
2014	Cuban Fury	James Griffiths	British Film Institute; Film4	StudioCanal
2015	Man Up	Ben Palmer	StudioCanal; Anton Capital Entertainment; BBC Films	StudioCanal
2016	Grimsby	Louis Leterrier	Columbia Pictures; Village Roadshow Pictures; Four By Two Films; Working Title Films; LStar Capital	Sony Pictures Releasing
2017	Baby Driver	Edgar Wright	TriStar Pictures; MRC; Working Title Films	Sony Pictures Releasing
2019	The Kid Who Would Be King	Joe Cornish	Working Title Films	20th Century Fox
2020	Rebecca	Ben Wheatley	Working Title Films	Netflix

==== Upcoming ====
Year	Title
TBA	Baby Driver 2
TBA	Untitled Attack the Block sequel

=== Critical reception ===
Film	Rotten Tomatoes	Metacritic	References
Shaun of the Dead	92%	76	
Hot Fuzz	91%	81	
Scott Pilgrim vs. the World	82%	69	
Paul	71%	57	
Attack the Block	90%	75	
Sightseers	85%	69	
The World's End	89%	81	
In Fear	83%	66	
Cuban Fury	51%	52	
Man Up	82%	68	
Grimsby	38%	44	
Baby Driver	93%	86	
The Kid Who Would Be King	90%	66	

== Commercial performance ==
Film	Budget	Domestic Gross	Worldwide Gross	Reference
Shaun of the Dead	$6,100,000	$13,542,874	$30,039,392	
Hot Fuzz	$12,000,000	$23,637,265	$80,573,774	
Scott Pilgrim vs. the World	$60,000,000	$31,524,275	$47,664,559	
Paul	$40,000,000	$37,412,945	$97,984,015	
Attack the Block	$13,000,000	$1,024,175	$5,824,175	
Sightseers	N/A	$61,782	$2,122,909	
The World's End	$20,000,000	$26,004,851	$46,089,287	
In Fear	N/A	N/A	N/A	N/A
Cuban Fury	$1,500,000	$92,384	$5,645,773	
Man Up	N/A	N/A	$2,405,002	
Grimsby	$35,000,000	$6,828,166	$19,047,965	
Baby Driver	$34,000,000	$107,825,862	$226,945,087	
The Kid Who Would Be King	$59,000,000	$16,790,790	$32,140,970	

== TV shows ==
=== List of TV shows ===
Year	Title
1999–2001	Spaced
2000–2004	Black Books
2009	Free Agents
2010–2013	Him & Her
2010–2014	Rev.
2011–2020	Friday Night Dinner
2011	King Of...
2011	The Pranker
2011	Show Me the Funny
2011	Comedy Showcase: Chickens
2011–2012	Threesome
2011	Patrick Monahan Live
2012	Friday Night Dinner (US)
2013–2016	Raised By Wolves
2013–2015	The Job Lot
2013	Chickens
2013–2014	Youngers
2013	Ambassadors
2014	Mr. Sloane
2014	Our Zoo
2015	Cockroaches
2016	Crashing
2016	Houdini and Doyle
2016–2019	Mum
2016–2020	Cold Feet
2017–2019	Timewasters
2017	Just a Couple
2017–2021	Back
2017–2019	Living the Dream
2018	Bliss
2018	The Imitation Game
2019–2021	The Goes Wrong Show
2022	I Hate You
2024	The Completely Made-Up Adventures of Dick Turpin
2025-	Mitchell and Webb Are Not Helping
2026	Can You Keep a Secret?

== Awards and nominations ==
Year	Association	Category	Nominee(s)	Result
2017	Diversity in Media Awards	Production Company of the Year	Big Talk Productions	Nominated
