= Betty Limpany =

British criminal (died 1799)

Betty Limpany was executed by hanging in Devon in 1799. She worked as a maid and was accused of arson for burning down her master's house in Kentisbeare. She was 18 years old.

In 1997, Wide Angle Productions produced a film based on the case.
