= In Fear =

- Directed by: Jeremy Lovering
- Written by: Jeremy Lovering.
- Produced by: James Biddle; Nira Park
- Starring: Iain De Caestecker; Alice Englert; Allen Leech
- Cinematography: David Katznelson
- Edited by: Jonathan Amos
- Music by: Roly Porter; Daniel Pemberton
- Production company: Big Talk Productions
- Distributed by: StudioCanal
- Release date: 20 January 2013 (Sundance Film Festival)
- Running time: 85 minutes
- Country: United Kingdom
- Language: English

In Fear is a 2013 British psychological horror film directed and written by Jeremy Lovering. The film premiered on 20 January 2013 at the Sundance Film Festival. It stars Iain De Caestecker and Alice Englert as a young couple terrorised by an unknown assailant.

== Plot ==
After dating for just two weeks, Tom invites Lucy to go with him and some friends to a festival. The night before, Tom plans to take Lucy to the Kilairney House Hotel, which he booked online and is hidden away on a series of remote roads in the Irish countryside. Before making their way to the hotel, the couple stop at a pub and a confrontation occurs between Tom and some of the locals.

On the empty back road to the hotel, Tom and Lucy find themselves going in circles despite following the signs and their satnav stops working. They eventually realise that they keep returning to the same point no matter which route they take and are unable to find their way back to the main road. Strange things begin happening, including Lucy spotting a man in a white mask and someone attempting to grab her from the darkness.

While speeding down the road away from their attacker, Tom clips a man in the road. He and Lucy pick up the man, who says his name is Max. Max claims to be under attack by the same people stalking the couple. However, he is eventually revealed to be the true culprit, as he and his group have been manipulating the signs and roadblocks on the road themselves.

Max mocks Tom and Lucy's fear, explaining that victims always swerve at the last second out of basic human instinct, even when driving directly at the person who has been terrorizing them, rather than intentionally running them over. Tom kicks Max out of the car following a harrowing confrontation and Max breaks Tom's wrist in a subsequent fight.

Lucy and Tom take their torches to hide in the woods from him when their car runs out of petrol. In the darkness Tom is grabbed and disappears. Lucy returns to the car alone and finds a petrol can in the front seat. After refilling the tank and with the satnav now mysteriously working again, Lucy drives on and eventually finds the hotel, but discovers that it is abandoned. The car park is a graveyard of derelict cars, suggesting that she and Tom are not the first victims.

Max returns in a Land Rover and pursues Lucy. When Lucy is able to stop the car, she finds a tube running from the exhaust pipe into the boot. She opens the boot and discovers Tom bound inside, dead from carbon monoxide poisoning from the tube forced into his throat.

As day breaks, Lucy finds the way back to the main road, but as she drives over a lonely moor towards it she sees Max standing in the road in the distance. Max stretches out his arms and smiles at her. Lucy slams her foot on the pedal and accelerates towards Max, leaving it ambiguous as to whether she swerves at the last second like Max predicted.

== Cast ==
- Iain De Caestecker as Tom
- Alice Englert as Lucy
- Allen Leech as Max

== Production ==
Although set in the Irish countryside, In Fear was filmed on and around Bodmin Moor in Cornwall and at Blackborough House in Devon.

Actors Alice Englert and Iain De Caestacker were not told what would happen to their characters during filming, other than the basic setup of the story, with many of their shocked reactions therefore being genuine and not acted. The film was also shot in sequence to better achieve this.

== Soundtrack ==
Alice Englert performs the song Conversation With Death that plays over the end credits.

== Reception ==
Critical reception has been mostly positive. As of June 2020, the film holds an 84% approval rating on Rotten Tomatoes, based on 58 reviews with an average rating of 6.73 out of 10. The website's critics consensus reads: "Compact and effective, In Fear offers discerning horror fans a smart and disturbing plunge into the depths of cinematic anxiety." It has a score of 66 on Metacritic, based on 14 reviews, indicating "generally favorable reviews". Much of the film's praise centered around the camerawork, and The Hollywood Reporter commented that "Lovering's camera setups turn an already tight car into an increasingly claustrophobic setting." Empire gave the film a mixed review, remarking that it had "atmosphere and enough proper scares to deliver on the promise of its title", but that it was also "contrived and nothing new plot-wise." Lou MacGregor of nobutlisten.com called it "up there with some of the best (worst?) examples of profoundly discomforting horror from the European canon".
