= Man Up (film) =

2015 romantic comedy film

- Theatrical release poster
- Directed by: Ben Palmer
- Written by: Tess Morris
- Produced by: Nira Park; James Biddle; Rachel Prior
- Starring: Lake Bell; Simon Pegg; Rory Kinnear; Ken Stott; Harriet Walter; Olivia Williams; Sharon Horgan
- Cinematography: Andrew Dunn
- Edited by: Paul Machliss
- Music by: Dickon Hinchliffe
- Production companies: StudioCanal; Anton Capital Entertainment; BBC Films; Big Talk Productions
- Distributed by: StudioCanal
- Release dates: 19 April 2015 (Tribeca); 29 May 2015 (United Kingdom)
- Running time: 88 minutes
- Countries: United Kingdom; France
- Language: English
- Box office: $2.9 million

Man Up is a 2015 romantic comedy film directed by Ben Palmer and written by Tess Morris. It stars Lake Bell and Simon Pegg.

The film follows a 34-year old single woman who is mistaken for a stranger's blind date and finds the perfect man for her in a 40-year old divorcé.

The film was released in the United Kingdom on 29 May 2015. It received positive reviews from critics.

== Plot ==
Nancy is a 34-year-old journalist who has been dating unsuccessfully for the past four years. Her sister encourages her to keep putting herself out there. Nancy goes to her friend's engagement party and has an awkward blind date. She then travels to London to attend her parents' 40th anniversary celebration where she plans to give a speech.

On the train, Nancy sits across from Jessica, a bubbly younger woman on her way to a blind date, who will identify herself to her date with a self-help book called Six Billion People and You. While talking to Jessica, Nancy expresses her pessimism about life and love. Jessica walks off the train at London Waterloo station, leaving her book behind with a chapter marked that Jessica believes will help Nancy’s outlook. To return the unwanted book, Nancy pursues Jessica, who is delayed for her assignation buying a replacement book in a bookstore near the designated meeting place. Meanwhile, Jessica's blind date, Jack, spots Nancy with the book coincidentally under the designated clock and mistakes her for Jessica. Before she can explain the situation, Jack charms her with his rambling introduction. Nancy impulsively pretends to be Jessica.

Despite Nancy’s awkward impersonation, she and Jack hit it off immediately. They talk and get to know each other, and Nancy learns that Jack is a 40-year-old, divorced, online-marketing manager. They have a good time, drinking and bowling. Then, Nancy runs into her secondary school classmate and stalker, Sean, who works at the bowling alley. Hearing about Nancy's deception, he tries to blackmail her into kissing him in a bathroom stall. The two are caught in a compromising position by Jack, and Nancy admits she is not actually his date. Jack and Nancy argue, criticising each other's opinions and life choices.

Realising they have lost Jack's bag and Nancy's notebook with her speech, they race back to the bar. There, they meet Ed and Hilary, Jack's soon-to-be-ex-wife. Trying to irritate Hilary, Jack pretends Nancy is his girlfriend, and Nancy plays along. She learns that Ed and Hilary had an affair, which led to the divorce. Jack gets upset and goes to a bathroom stall. Nancy joins him, and he tearfully admits he has not recovered from his failed marriage. Nancy says that her own bad relationship history has made her bitter. She consoles Jack and says that he will eventually be all right. They go back to the bar, and Nancy accidentally sets Ed on fire before spraying Ed and Hilary with a fire extinguisher, to Jack's delight.

Nancy decides to go to her parents' anniversary party, which is already underway. She is about to invite Jack, but he learns that Jessica still wants to meet him, so they part ways. Nancy arrives at her parents' party but is sad about leaving Jack.

During his date with Jessica, Jack finds they do not have much in common. He fully realizes that leaving Nancy was a mistake when he discovers that she has inadvertently swapped notebooks with him. With Jessica's blessing, he goes to find Nancy.

Jack enlists the help of Sean, who then misdirects him to the wrong address in Nancy’s neighborhood and goes to try his luck with Nancy himself, to no avail. Jack ends up at a party of teenagers, but one of them knows where Nancy's parents live. At the anniversary party, Nancy gives an impromptu speech to her parents, one that includes the sentiment that her date with Jack changed her for the better.

Simultaneously, Jack arrives with Nancy's speech for her parents. When Nancy informs him that she has already given her speech, Jack asks whether she would like to hear his speech and she agrees. In front of Nancy’s family, Jack gives Nancy a speech that she is very much the right girl for him, and they kiss.

== Cast ==
- Lake Bell as Nancy
- Simon Pegg as Jack
- Rory Kinnear as Sean
- Ken Stott as Bert, Nancy’s father
- Harriet Walter as Fran, Nancy’s mother
- Sharon Horgan as Elaine, Nancy’s sister
- Ophelia Lovibond as Jessica
- Olivia Williams as Hilary
- Stephen Campbell Moore as Ed
- Henry Lloyd-Hughes as Daniel
- Dean-Charles Chapman as Harry
- Robert Wilfort as Ryan
- Phoebe Waller-Bridge as Katie
- Paul Thornley as Adam

== Production ==
In June 2013, it was announced Simon Pegg had joined the Big Talk production, co-starring as the romantic interest. On 19 November 2013, Lake Bell joined the cast as the film's lead, with The Inbetweeners director Ben Palmer set to direct. The film received funding from BBC Films, with Anton Capital Entertainment and Amazon Prime Instant Video joining as minor production partners. StudioCanal distributed the film.

Olivia Williams, Rory Kinnear, Stephen Campbell Moore, Sharon Horgan, Harriet Walter, and Ken Stott joined the cast during filming. Principal photography began on 20 January 2014 in London.

== Release and reception ==
Man Up premiered at the 2015 Tribeca Film Festival on 19 April 2015 and was released theatrically in the United Kingdom on 29 May 2015 by StudioCanal. The film was released in the United States by Saban Films on 13 November 2015. It grossed $2.9 million worldwide.

The film received positive reviews from critics. On review aggregator website Rotten Tomatoes, the film has an 80% rating based on 80 reviews, with an average rating of 6.25/10. The site's consensus states: "Thanks to fine performances from Lake Bell and Simon Pegg, Man Up largely strikes the deceptively difficult balance between romance and comedy." On Metacritic, the film holds a 69 out of 100 rating, based on 18 critics.
