= The Kid Who Would Be King =

2019 science fantasy action-adventure film by Joe Cornish

- Theatrical release poster
- Directed by: Joe Cornish
- Written by: Joe Cornish
- Produced by: Nira Park; Tim Bevan; Eric Fellner
- Starring: Louis Ashbourne Serkis; Tom Taylor; Rebecca Ferguson; Patrick Stewart
- Cinematography: Bill Pope
- Edited by: Jonathan Amos; Paul Machliss
- Music by: Electric Wave Bureau
- Production companies: Working Title Films; Big Talk Pictures
- Distributed by: 20th Century Fox
- Release dates: 25 January 2019 (United States); 15 February 2019 (United Kingdom)
- Running time: 120 minutes
- Countries: United Kingdom; United States
- Language: English
- Budget: $59 million
- Box office: $32.1 million

The Kid Who Would Be King is a 2019 urban fantasy action-adventure film written and directed by Joe Cornish. A British/American venture, the film stars Louis Ashbourne Serkis, Tom Taylor, Dean Chaumoo, Rhianna Doris, Angus Imrie, Rebecca Ferguson, and Patrick Stewart. The plot follows a young boy who finds King Arthur's legendary sword Excalibur and must use it to stop an ancient enchantress from enslaving the world with help from his classmates (and former bullies) from school.

It was distributed and created by 20th Century Fox in association with Working Title Films. The film was released in the United States on 25 January 2019, and in the United Kingdom on 15 February 2019.

Despite receiving positive reviews, the movie was a box-office bomb, with estimated losses for the studio ranging as high as $50 million. It was also the second-to-last film to be released by 20th Century Fox (after Alita: Battle Angel) before The Walt Disney Company took over the studio as part of their acquisition of 21st Century Fox on 20 March 2019.

== Plot ==
Alex is a 12 year old boy who is a Year 7 student in a London suburb. When his best friend Bedders is bullied by older students, Lance and Kaye, Alex comes to his aid. Alex, Lance, and Kaye are given detention by the headmistress.

Lance and Kaye plot to harm Alex. That night, the duo chase Alex as he heads home, but Alex hides in a nearby construction site, where he finds and extracts a mysterious sword embedded in concrete. Later showing it to Bedders, they discover that its markings identify it as Excalibur, the sword of King Arthur. Alex then playfully "knights" Bedders.

The wicked sorceress Morgana awakens underground and sends her Mortes Milles demons after Excalibur. The next day, a teenager appears from inside Stonehenge and presents himself at Alex's school as a new student. The boy reveals himself to Alex as the wizard Merlin, capable of aging backward, but will occasionally shift into his elder Arthurian form. Alex plans to return the sword, wanting nothing to do with ancient myths. That night, Merlin saves Alex from a demon and explains that he has four days to destroy Morgana, or she will enslave all of Britain.

The Mortes Milles only appear at night and can only be seen by Alex and those he has knighted, but an upcoming total solar eclipse will enable Morgana to emerge fully into the world. Alex realizes that these events parallel an inscribed storybook his estranged father once gave him. Alex concludes he descends from Arthur through his father and later recruits and knights Lance and Kaye, who fight beside Alex and Bedders, defeating three demons with a car. Alex declares them a new Round Table. Merlin soon tasks Alex to find the entrance of Morgana's Underworld prison.

Alex leads the group to Tintagel, where he last saw his father. En route, Merlin trains them in swordsmanship. But when Morgana infiltrates the lesson, Lance betrays Alex and takes the sword for himself. Merlin barely saves them, and Excalibur is destroyed when Alex and Lance come to blows in a marsh. As Lance and Kaye start to leave, Alex calls upon the Lady of the Lake, whose arm emerges from the water and restores the sword.

Resolving their differences and rededicating themselves to the quest, the four overcome a horde of demons by luring them over a cliff. Arriving at Tintagel, Alex meets his aunt Sophie who tells him that his father was an alcoholic who abandoned Alex and his mother, Mary. Sophie reveals that it was Mary who inscribed the book, which enrages Alex, feeling his mother is a liar, and he has come a long way for nothing. Merlin stops him, telling Alex that Excalibur is not handed down by birthright, but by individual merit.

Alex and his friends arm themselves, and Alex uses the storybook to locate the entrance to the Underworld. Alex challenges Morgana, who takes on a monstrous form and breathes fire, but Alex strikes her down, and the children escape. Believing Morgana is dead, Alex returns Excalibur to the Lady of the Lake, knowing that the police would likely confiscate it and makes up a story for his mother, who apologizes for her lie: she never told him the truth about his father or the book, because if he had known the truth to begin with, it would've made him more heartbroken.

On the day of the eclipse, Merlin informs Alex that Morgana was merely wounded, and Alex realizes that he violated the Chivalric Code by lying to his mother. In desperation, Alex tells her everything that has happened, then stuns her by summoning the Lady of the Lake into the bathtub, where he regains Excalibur.

At the school, Merlin enchants the staff, and Alex knights the entire student body. During the eclipse, Morgana – in a huge, semi draconic form – appears with the entire Mortes Milles. The children fight back, using strategies combining medieval warfare with modern technology. Merlin casts a magic spell to pull Morgana from the world, and Alex decapitates her as she vanishes, dispelling all the demons. Alex, Bedders, Lance, and Kaye bid farewell to Merlin, who encourages them to become leaders. Alex once again returns the sword to the Lady of the Lake.

== Cast ==
- Louis Ashbourne Serkis as Alex
- Tom Taylor as Lance
- Dean Chaumoo as Bedders
- Rhianna Dorris as Kaye
- Angus Imrie as Young Merlin
- Rebecca Ferguson as Morgana
- Patrick Stewart as Adult Merlin
- Nick Mohammed as Mr. Hyde
- Denise Gough as Mary
- Genevieve O'Reilly as Sophie

== Production ==
Principal photography on the film began on 25 September 2017 in London, and ended in March 2018. The film was shot in Cornwall, Ark Putney Academy and at Warner Bros. Studios, Leavesden. The visual effects were provided by DNEG, Rodeo FX, Peerless and TPO VFX, and were supervised by Joel Green, Antoine Moulineau, Laurent Gillet, Marc Hutchings, Jack Hughes and Frazer Churchill.

== Reception ==
=== Box office ===
The Kid Who Would Be King grossed $16.8 million in the United States and Canada, and $15.4 million in other territories, for a total worldwide gross of $32.1 million, against a production budget of $59 million. In the United States and Canada, the film opened in 3,521 theaters, grossing $7.3 million in its opening weekend, finishing fourth at the box office. The film opened on #7 when it was released in the United Kingdom.

Following its initial performance, it was announced the film was expected to lose the studios around $50 million, taking into account its high marketing costs. The poor debut of the film was attributed to the medieval subject matter mixed with a modern context, which has had several flops in the past three years, including King Arthur: Legend of the Sword and Robin Hood, and the difficulty of promoting a family film based on such material. In its second weekend, the film fell 42% to $4.2 million, finishing seventh.

=== Critical reception ===
On review aggregator Rotten Tomatoes, the film has a 90% rating based on 193 reviews, with an average rating of 6.9/10. The website's critical consensus reads, "The Kid Who Would Be King recalls classic all ages adventures – and repurposes a timeless legend – for a thoroughly enjoyable new addition to the family movie canon." On Metacritic, the film has a weighted average score of 66 out of 100, based on 34 critics.

Audiences polled by CinemaScore gave the film an average grade of "B+" on an A+ to F scale, while those at PostTrak gave it an overall positive score of 71% and a "definite recommend" of 46%.

== See also ==
- The Sword in the Stone (1963), the film adaptation King Arthur.
- No Time for Nuts (2006), the short-film adaptation Scrat's time machines sword Excalibur.
- List of films featuring eclipses
- The Dark Is Rising Sequence (1965–1977), a series novels by Susan Cooper about children in modern England who are supernaturally tasked to continue King Arthur's mission.
  - The Seeker (2007), the film adaptation thereof.
- Camelot 3000 (1982–1985), a comic book about King Arthur and his knights being reborn in the space age.
- King Arthur
