= Grimsby (film) =

2016 film by Louis Leterrier

- British theatrical release poster
- Directed by: Louis Leterrier
- Screenplay by: Sacha Baron Cohen; Phil Johnston; Peter Baynham
- Story by: Sacha Baron Cohen; Phil Johnston
- Produced by: Sacha Baron Cohen; Nira Park; Peter Baynham; Ant Hines; Todd Schulman
- Starring: Sacha Baron Cohen; Mark Strong; Isla Fisher; Rebel Wilson; Gabourey Sidibe; Penélope Cruz
- Cinematography: Oliver Wood
- Edited by: James Thomas; Jonathan Amos; Debra Neil-Fisher; Evan Henke
- Music by: Erran Baron Cohen; David Buckley
- Production companies: Columbia Pictures; Village Roadshow Pictures; Four By Two Films; Working Title Films; Big Talk Productions; LStar Capital
- Distributed by: Sony Pictures Releasing
- Release dates: 24 February 2016 (United Kingdom); 11 March 2016 (United States)
- Running time: 83 minutes
- Countries: United Kingdom; United States
- Language: English
- Budget: $35 million
- Box office: $28 million

Grimsby (released as The Brothers Grimsby in the United States and Canada) is a 2016 spy action black comedy film directed by Louis Leterrier and written by Sacha Baron Cohen, Phil Johnston, and Peter Baynham. The film stars Baron Cohen, Mark Strong, Rebel Wilson, Isla Fisher, Annabelle Wallis, Gabourey Sidibe, Penélope Cruz, and Ian McShane, and follows a football hooligan who reunites with his long-lost brother, an MI6 agent, and must work together to stop the global plot.

Grimsby was released by Sony Pictures Releasing, on 24 February 2016 in the United Kingdom and 11 March 2016 in the United States. It was poorly received by film critics and failed to recoup its $35 million budget, making it a box-office failure.

== Plot ==
Kyle Alan "Nobby" Butcher had been separated from his little brother Sebastian Butcher for 28 years. During their years apart, Nobby became an alcoholic football hooligan who started a life with his partner Dawn and their 11 children in Grimsby, while Sebastian, now known as Sebastian Graves, has become one of MI6's top agents.

After completing an interrogation, Sebastian gets information regarding philanthropist Rhonda George, who is hosting a benefit called WorldCure and is a potential target for assassination, and is assigned to go. Nobby's friends at the pub also find out that Sebastian will be at WorldCure, and convince Nobby to go there and reconnect with him. At the event, Sebastian sees hitman Pavel Lukashenko, who plans to assassinate Rhonda with a gun disguised as a video camera. As Sebastian prepares to shoot the camera, Nobby sees him and gives him a hug, causing him to accidentally shoot an AIDS-infected Jewish-Palestinian boy named Schlomo (Yusuf Hofri). The spray of blood lands in Daniel Radcliffe's mouth, infecting him with AIDS.

The brothers go on the run from the authorities and other criminals. Despite Sebastian's protests, Nobby convinces him that it would be best to hide out at his home in Grimsby. Meanwhile, believing that Sebastian has gone rogue, MI6 orders an assassin named Chilcott to track him down. Sebastian calls his handler Jodie and proclaims his innocence. Chilcott and his men find the two brothers at a pub; they both manage to escape, though Sebastian is hit with two Lonomia poison darts in his shoulder and testicle. Nobby is reluctantly forced to suck the poison out of both places, saving Sebastian's life.

Sebastian learns from Jodie that Lukashenko was going to make a deal with Joris Smit in a South African lodge, so the brothers travel there. Sebastian accidentally injects himself with heroin that Nobby bought, mistaking it for the bone-strengthening treatment for his broken ankle. Nobby then assumes his brother's identity and goes undercover. He mistakenly seduces a cleaner named Banu as she wore similar clothing to Joris' wife Lina and is interrupted by Joris and his two men. Sebastian arrives in the nick of time and saves Nobby. Lina tells them that Lukashenko purchased some sort of virus, but she is fatally shot by Chilcott's men from a distance before she can reveal any further information. To outrun Chilcott's men, the brothers are forced to hide inside an elephant's vagina, but end up covered in elephant semen after several males have sex with the female while they are inside.

After the brothers have cleaned themselves up, Sebastian asks why Nobby abandoned him as a child. Nobby explains that Sebastian's adoptive parents only wanted to adopt one of the brothers but were unable to decide, and he ran away so Sebastian could have a better life. Sebastian apologises to Nobby. The brothers travel to Chile, the venue of the football cup final between England and Germany. They realise that the syndicate plans to unleash their weapon in the arena, but the syndicate captures Sebastian. Rhonda, the real mastermind of the plot, visits Sebastian and tells him her plans to launch the virus (called WorldCure) into the arena via fireworks. Nobby kills Lukashenko and other henchmen on his way before rescuing Sebastian.

The brothers race back to the arena and spot Rhonda. Chilcott attempts to kill Sebastian, but Nobby's kids throw Schlomo's wheelchair at him, knocking him over and impaling him on a helmet while Nobby goes after Rhonda. Nobby then tries to shoot Rhonda but his gun jams and he realises he must stop the fireworks himself. He sits on one of the fireworks containing the virus; Sebastian sits on the other at the last minute, reaffirming his brotherhood with Nobby. The fireworks go off with the two atop them and the brothers are knocked unconscious upon landing. Nobby's gun goes off and shoots Daniel Radcliffe, whose AIDS-infected blood spills into Donald Trump's mouth.

The news reports state that Rhonda has been arrested, the Grimsby brothers have "died" after saving the world, and that Trump has AIDS. Schlomo is in custody after "killing" Chilcott. The brothers are actually recovering in the hospital, and Jodie visits and gives them new identities, informing them that the virus did not affect them because its antidote is elephant semen. Nobby's family visits them. Eight weeks later, Nobby and Sebastian are on a mission in Indonesia. On a boat, Nobby is approached by a team of gunmen, whom he quickly kills. He reaches Sebastian, who asks him if he has met the team, and Nobby realises too late that the gunmen were his team.

In a post-credits scene, the brothers are in a car and stop to ask a man for directions to a football stadium. After receiving directions, Nobby shoots the man in order to "leave no witnesses", disturbing Sebastian.

== Cast ==
- Sacha Baron Cohen as Kyle Alan "Nobby" Butcher, a football hooligan and the older brother of Sebastian.
- Mark Strong as Sebastian Graves, the best MI6 agent to date and the younger brother of Nobby.
- Isla Fisher as Jodie Figgs, Sebastian's handler.
- Rebel Wilson as Dawn, Nobby's partner and mother of his 11 children.
- Penélope Cruz as Rhonda George, an actress who wants to help cure the world of disease.
- Gabourey Sidibe as Banu, a South African hotel maid
- Nick Boraine as Joris Smit, a biochemist
- Annabelle Wallis as Lina Smit
- David Harewood as Black Gareth
- John Thomson as Bob Tolliver
- Ricky Tomlinson as Paedo Pete
- Johnny Vegas as Milky Pimms
- Scott Adkins as Pavel Lukashenko
- Sam Hazeldine as Jeremy Chilcott
- Barkhad Abdi as Tabansi Nyagura
- Tamsin Egerton as Carla Barnes
- Ian McShane as MI6 Spy Boss
- Nathan Noel Jukes as Stabber
- Miles Jupp as Policeman
- Peter Baynham as Parking Warden
- Yusuf Hofri as Shlomo Khalidi, the peace activist that has AIDS

== Production ==
=== Development ===
In October 2013, Sacha Baron Cohen was spotted attending a football match between Grimsby Town and Cambridge United. Baron Cohen, who was dressed in a Grimsby shirt, was also spotted talking with Town fans in a nearby pub after the game. It was later confirmed that he was scouting towns for the film, and had also checked out Scunthorpe, Hull and Newcastle in order to find inspiration for his new role. On 3 December 2013, Louis Leterrier was set to direct.

=== Casting ===
On 24 April 2014, Mark Strong joined the film to play a British black-ops spy and brother of Baron Cohen's character. On 25 April, Annabelle Wallis joined the cast of the film. On 11 June, Ian McShane, Gabourey Sidibe, David Harewood, and Johnny Vegas were confirmed as cast members. On 12 June, Baron Cohen's wife Isla Fisher was announced in a supporting role. The same day, Rebel Wilson's casting was announced, followed by Penélope Cruz on July 9.

=== Filming ===
Principal photography of the film commenced on 4 June 2014, at North Weald railway station, and around the Epping Forest area in Essex, England.

The shooting lasted for six weeks in the UK and then moved to South Africa. On 3 July, comedian Eric Idle tweeted a photo from the set with Baron Cohen.

On 10–11 July, Baron Cohen was filming Grimsby in Tilbury, which was modeled to resemble 1980s Grimsby. On 14 July, Baron Cohen and Strong were spotted filming some scenes for the film in the streets.

A number of residents of Grimsby were upset with Baron Cohen for negative stereotypes portraying their town as a rubbish-strewn, violent ghetto in which drunks urinate from windows and mothers hand children cans of beer in the street.

== Release ==
On 13 February 2014, the film moved from Paramount Pictures to Columbia Pictures, and it was announced that the film would be released in the U.S. on 31 July 2015.

On 21 January 2015, the film's U.S. release date was moved back to 26 February 2016. The film was then scheduled to be released on 4 March 2016, but was again moved back, to 11 March 2016.

== Reception ==
=== Box office ===
Grimsby grossed $6.9 million in North America and $21.1 million in other territories for a worldwide total of $28 million, against a budget of $35 million.

In the United States and Canada, the film opened on March 11, 2016, alongside 10 Cloverfield Lane, The Young Messiah and The Perfect Match. It was originally projected to gross $7–8 million in its opening weekend, however, after grossing just $1.2 million on its opening day, estimates were lowered to $3–4 million. It wound up grossing $3.3 million in its opening weekend, finishing 8th at the box office. Deadline Hollywood attributed the film's poor opening to its British content and marketing tactics alienating American audiences, much like Eddie the Eagle several weeks prior, with Forbes adding some possibly saw the film as Baron Cohen "doing the same shtick."

Sony Pictures' distribution head said, "[We] certainly wanted more... we tried to crack the code on it, but it just didn't happen for us." After its opening weekend, the film was deemed a box office bomb by numerous publications.

=== Critical response ===
On review aggregator Rotten Tomatoes, the film holds an approval rating of 37% based on 136 reviews, with an average rating of 4.80/10. The website's critical consensus reads, "The Brothers Grimsby showers viewers with a steady stream of Sacha Baron Cohen's edgy humor, but too many gags hit the wrong side of the line between audacious and desperate." On Metacritic, the film received a score of 44 based on 34 reviews, indicating "mixed or average" reviews. Audiences polled by CinemaScore gave the film an average grade of "B+" on an A+ to F scale. The Guardian rated the film with 2 out of 5 stars.

== Unofficial sequel ==
On March 11, 2016, Jay Samuelz and Arya Lee, released a short film titled Trouble Agent onto their YouTube channel which starred them alongside Sacha Baron Cohen as Nobby. It followed two agents portrayed by Samuel and Lee after they kidnapped Nobby by accident during their pursuit of Eric Shaw, an internationally wanted criminal who looks like Nobby.
