= Blackborough House =

Country house in Kentisbeare, Devon, UK

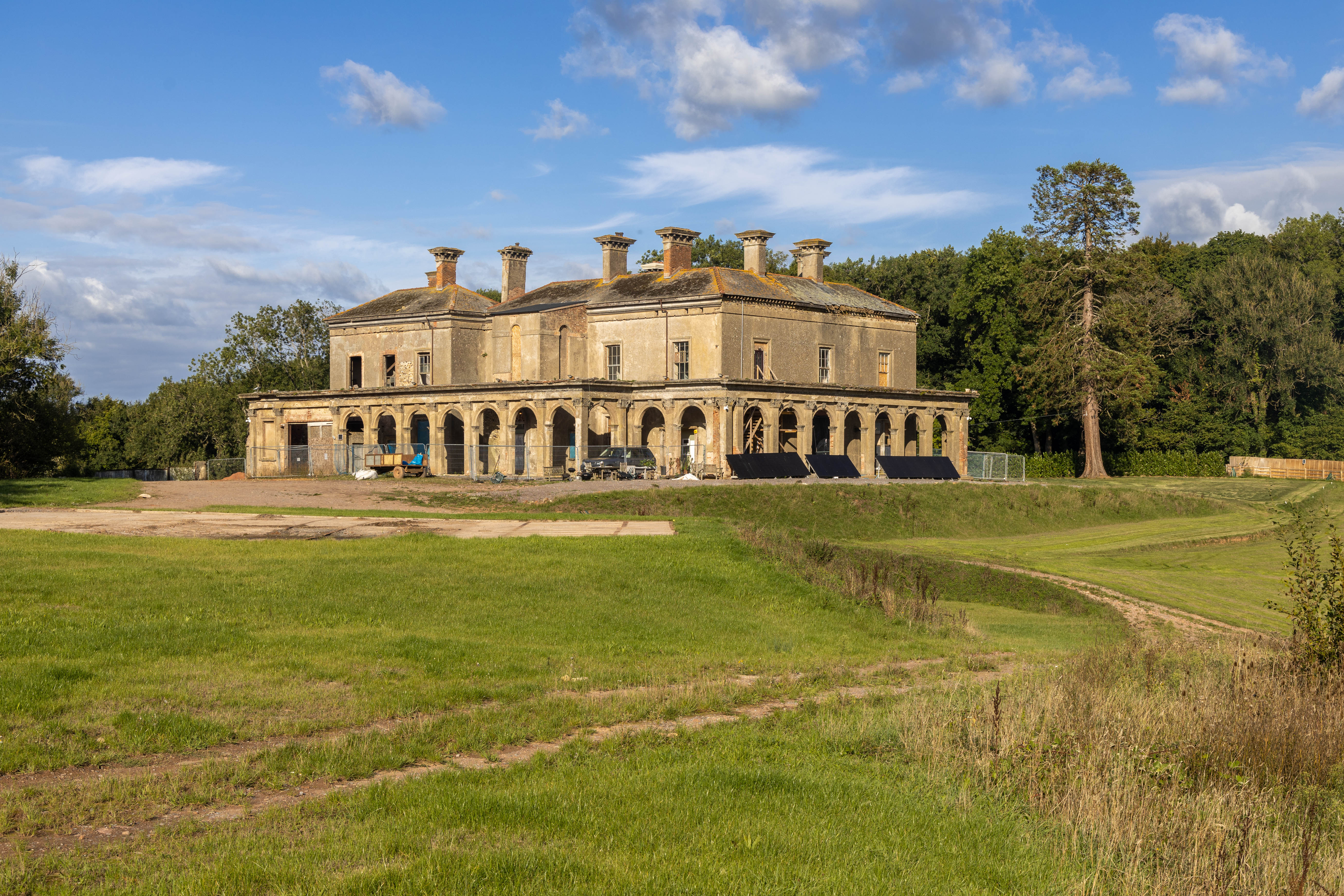
- Blackborough House in 2022

- Location within Devon

General information
- Status: Private House
- Type: Country house
- Architectural style: Italianate
- Location: Blackborough, Devon, England
- Coordinates: 50°52′46.1″N 3°17′42.4″W
- Groundbreaking: 1838
- Completed: 1840

Technical details
- Grounds: 12 acres (5 ha)

Design and construction
- Architect: James Thomas Knowles
- Designations

Listed Building – Grade II

Other information
- Number of rooms: 60

Blackborough House is a grade II listed privately owned country house in Blackborough, Devon, three miles (5 km) east of Cullompton. It was built in 1838 and as of 2023 is undergoing restoration.

== Construction ==
It was built in 1838 by James T. Knowles for George Wyndham, 4th Earl of Egremont, of Orchard Wyndham, Somerset. Originally designed as an Italianate palace, there were no funds to complete it on such a scale, so it was constructed as two smaller, linked buildings for the Earl and his cousin, the local rector. His other nearby palatial Devon residence Silverton Park, (demolished in 1901) was also designed in this style but was never completed.

The house is a 11,818 sq ft (1,097.9 m^{2}) square block constructed from stuccoed brick, with stone dressings and has hipped slate roofs with red ridge tiles. It has an arched colonnade or loggia around it on three sides and has two separate sets of stairs on either side so that each half of the house could be accessed independently. These entrance towers were originally 70 feet (21 m) tall but the top stage of each has been dismantled. There are two service wings around a courtyard and the building is two storeys tall throughout with a total of 60 rooms. There are small square windows on the upper floors designed to resemble the gunports of George Wyndham's ship, HMS Hawke. The central court yard, was covered in a glass dome and acted as a great hall but no longer has any sort of roof. The house has 10 acres (4 ha) of grounds surrounding it.

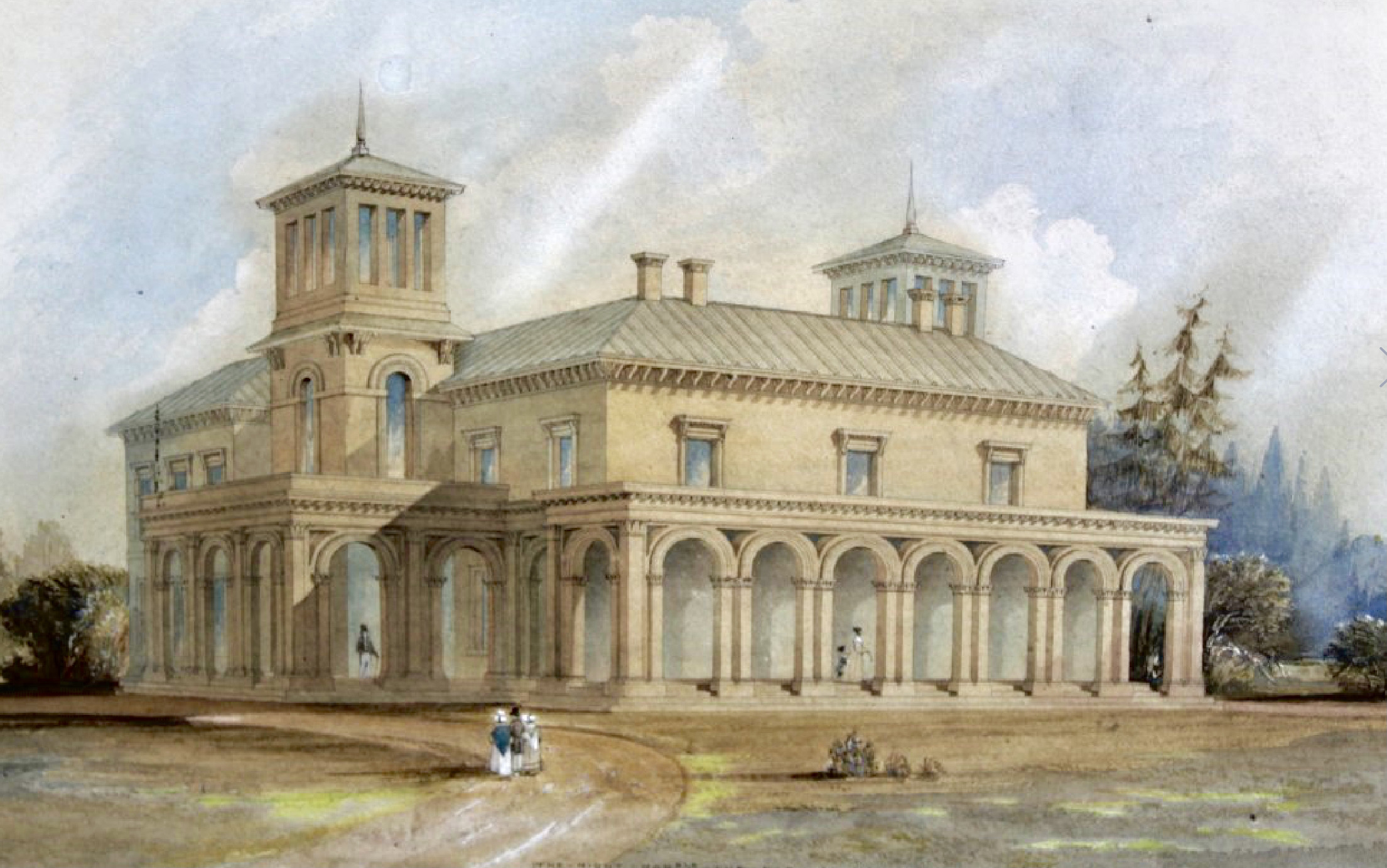
Watercolour of Blackborough House

== History of owners and uses ==
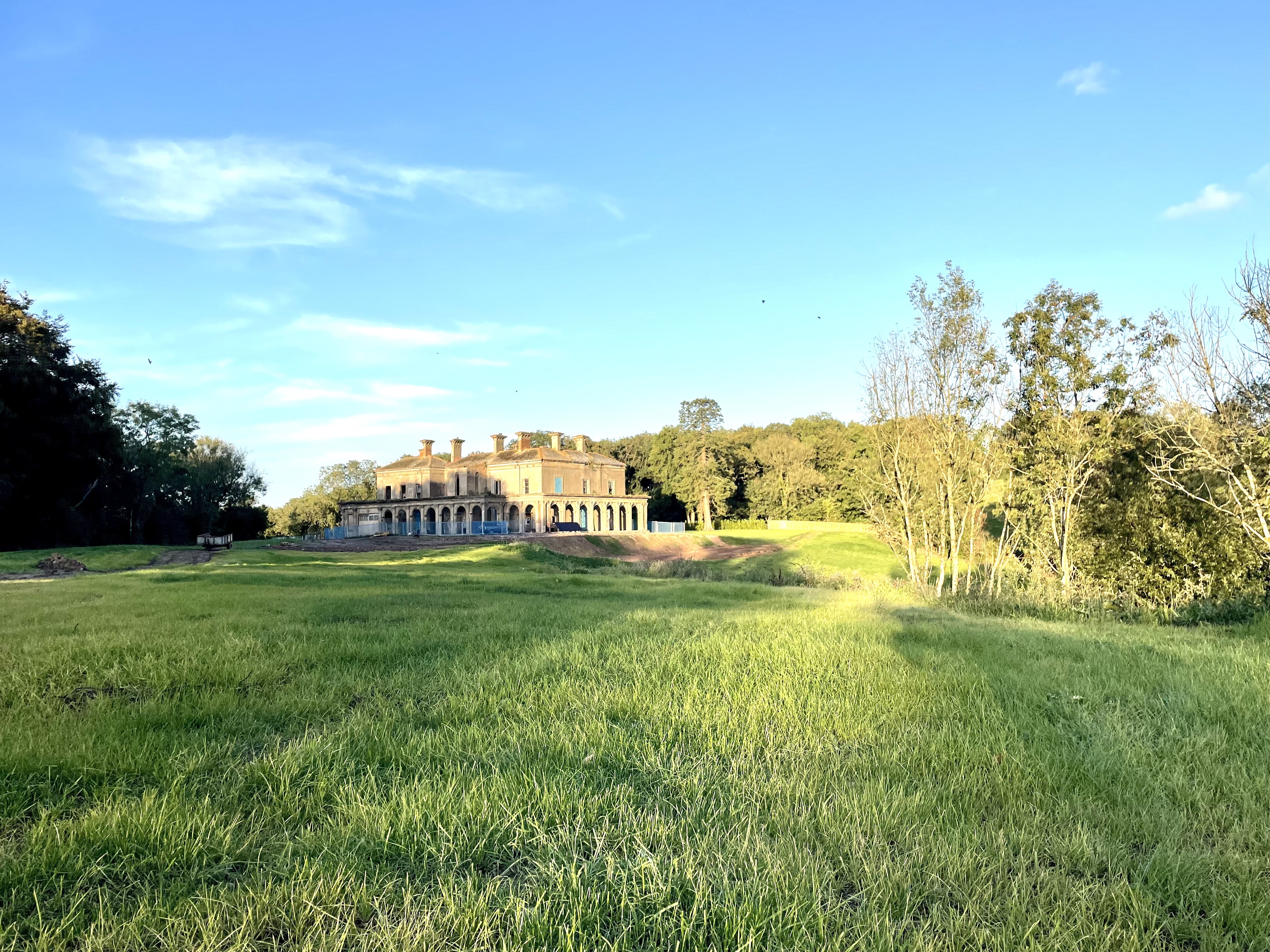
Blackborough House from Parkland.

The Devonshire historian William Pole (d.1635) gives the arms of "Bolegh of Blackburgh Bolley" as: Argent, on a chevron sable three bezants between three torteaux. This is the family of "Bolley (or Bolhay)" mentioned by Chalk (1910). The house was used as the rectory until 1894 and for some of that time was also a school for local children. In the middle of the nineteenth century a group of mostly Irish students studied with the Rev. William Cookesley Thompson at the house. Around the start of the twentieth century it was rented by an old woman and her daughter. From 1930 to 1939 it was a home for vagrants run by the council and the Church of England. It was a Quaker training centre for conscientious objectors doing relief work during World War II. From 1943 to 1946 or 1947, while still owned by the Quakers, it was used a YHA Youth Hostel known as Spiceland (named after the location of a Friends Meeting House, several miles away in the parish of Uffculme). It became a vehicle breakers' yard in 1951. In 2013 the grounds were used as a location in the horror film In Fear.

== Restoration plans ==
By 2011 the house was semi-derelict and had long been surrounded by a car scrap yard owned since about 1995 by Ralph Sanders, an amateur racing driver, who operated a car spare-parts business and was said to have old racing cars parked inside the house. The house featured in Trials and Tribulations an episode of the second series of the TV series Shed and Buried, broadcast on 24 January 2017 on the Travel Channel, where Henry and Sam purchased an old Triumph trials bike (stored within the house) from owner Ralph Sanders.

In 2011 the house and 12 acres (5 ha) were for sale for £1m, but did not sell, and was subsequently withdrawn.

In 2015 a sale was agreed for the house and 10 acres (4 ha) to a developer, to be completed by the end of 2016. On 17 September 2016 an auction was held, in preparation for the house sale, of 1,000-plus lots of motor vehicle remains and spare parts that occupied the house and grounds.

In 2018 planning permission was requested to develop the house and grounds into a 64 bedroom hotel and spa with four linked pavilions and seven detached villas in the grounds. The developers also plan to restore the seventy-foot towers which originally stood on the east and west sides and put a glass roof on the inner courtyard as well as adding a new low level extension. It will then be used as an events venue holding weddings, corporate events and exhibitions.

As of September 2020, the property had not been sold and was again listed for sale. According to Country Life, Blackborough had not yet "lost its roof entirely — something which could have been its death knell, due to the prohibitive costs of replacement". The property sold in 2016 for £850,000 and in 2020 for £650,000. As of 2023 it is for sale again, listed for auction at an estimated price of £1m.

== Gallery ==
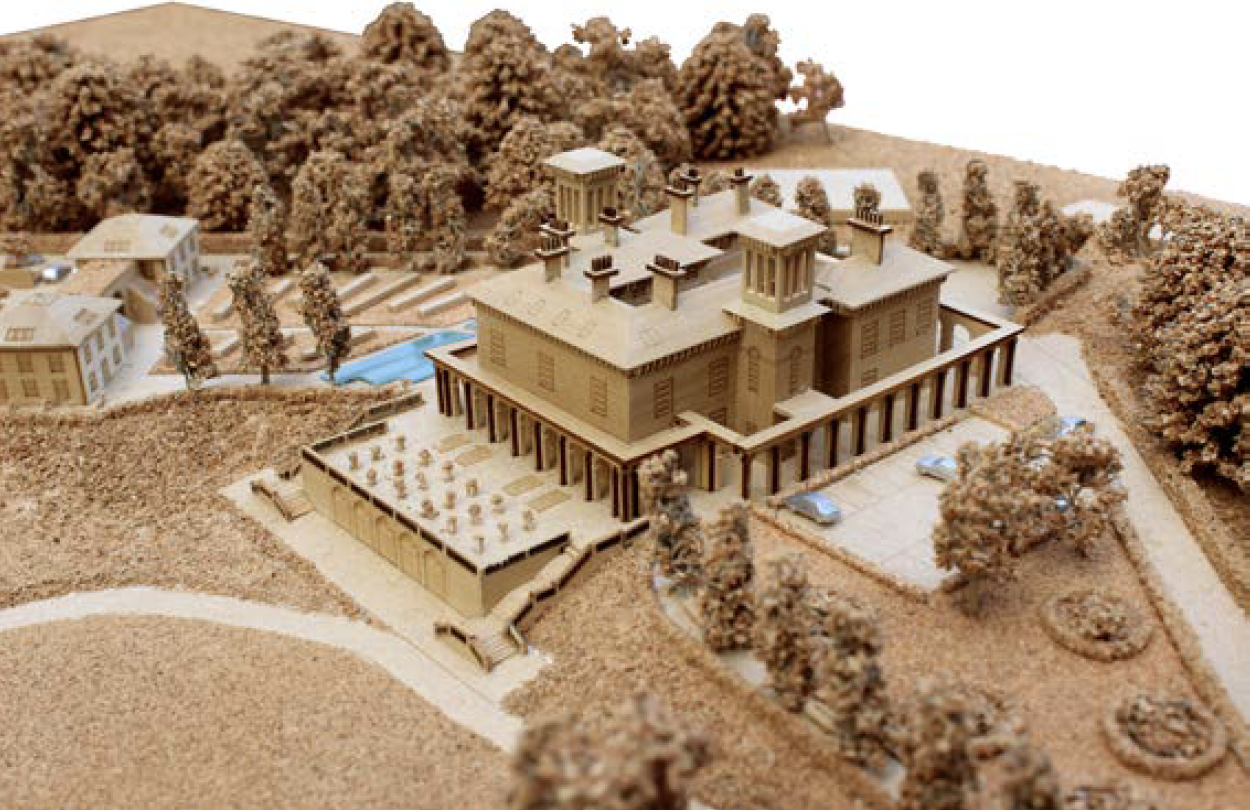
Model of restoration plans for Blackborough House in 2019

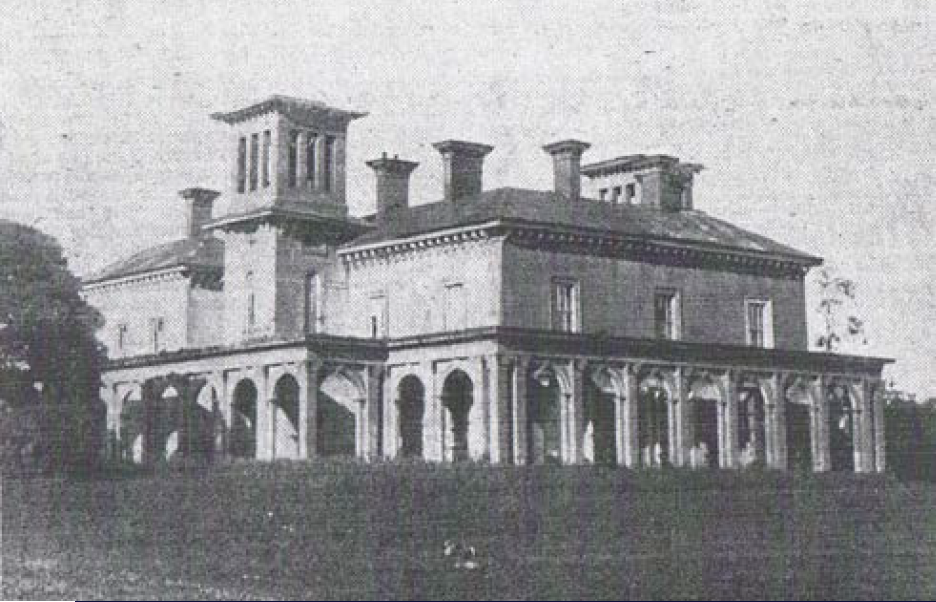

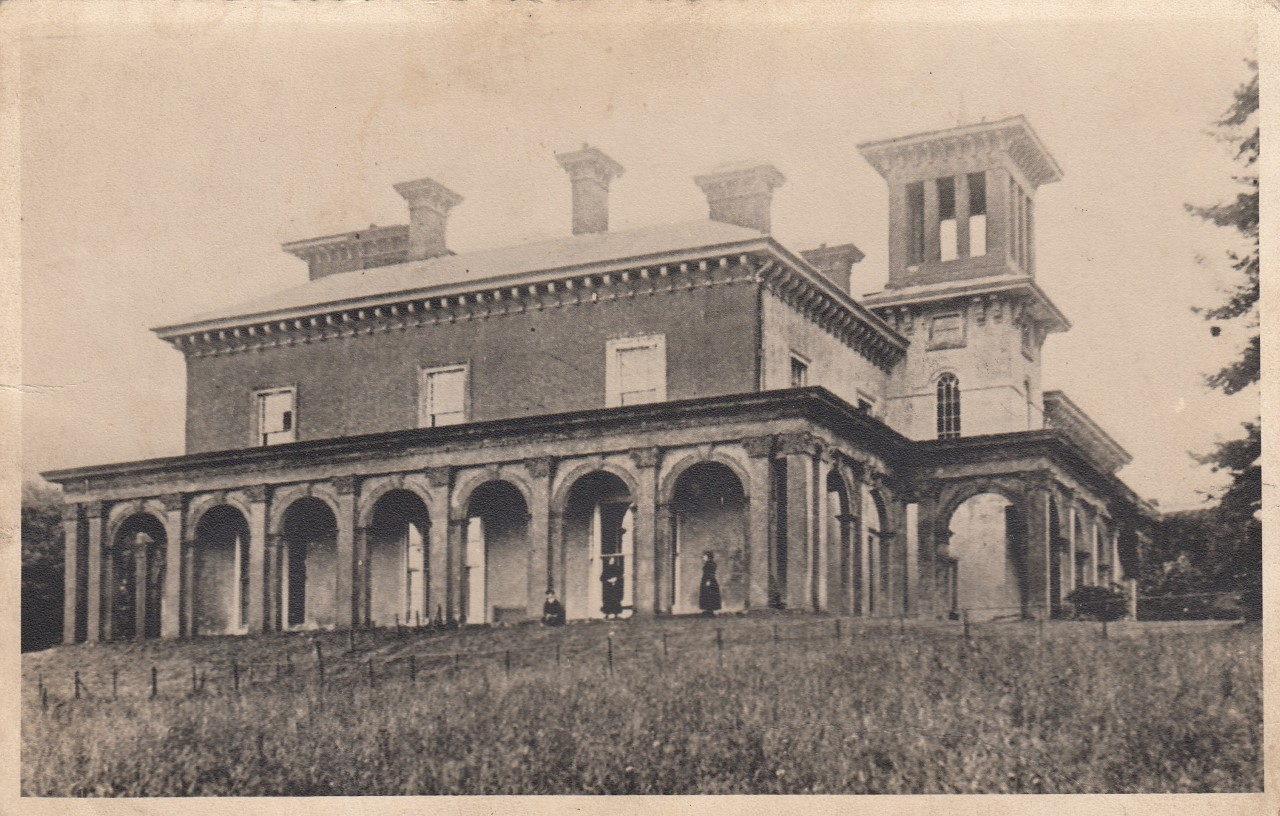

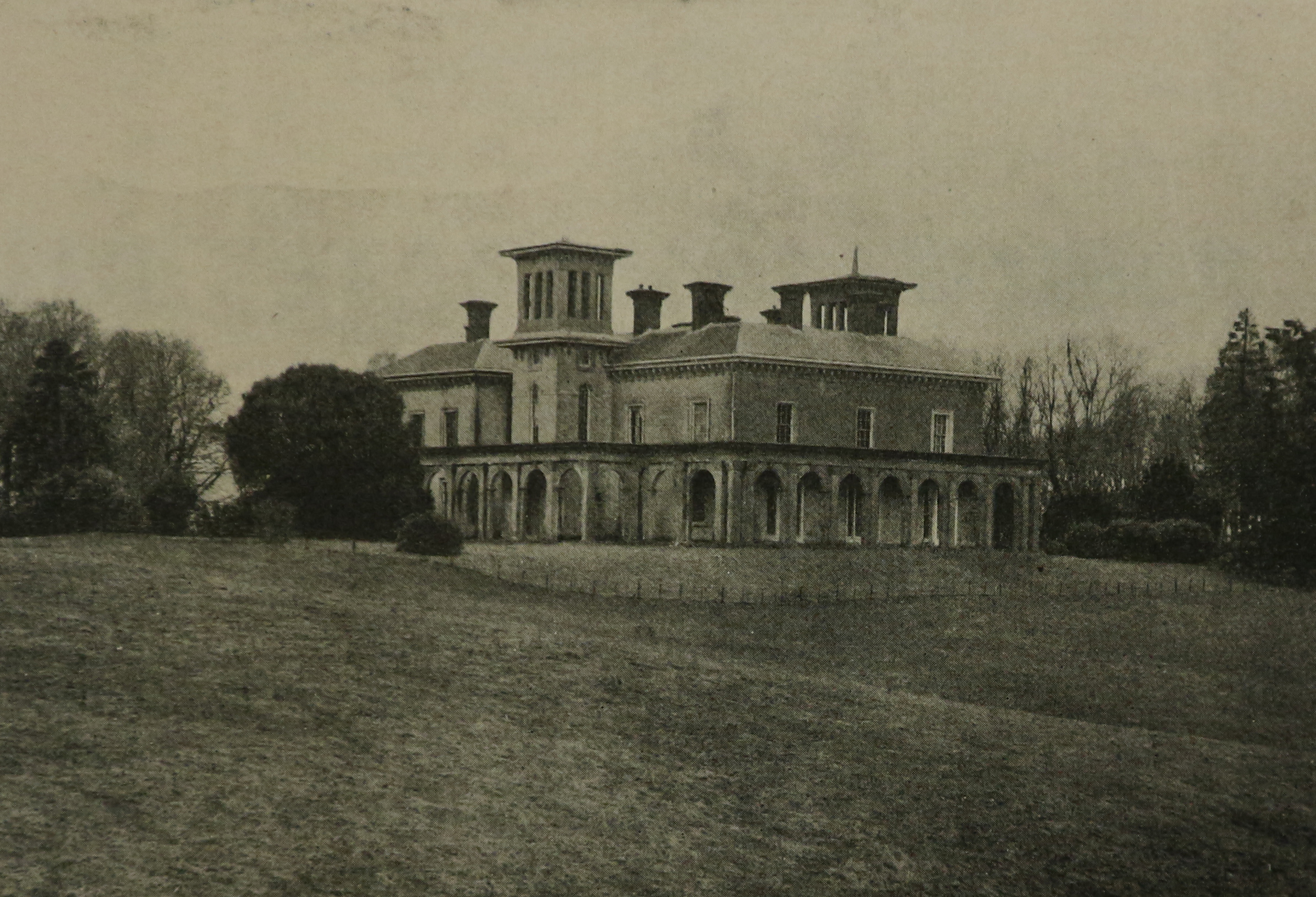

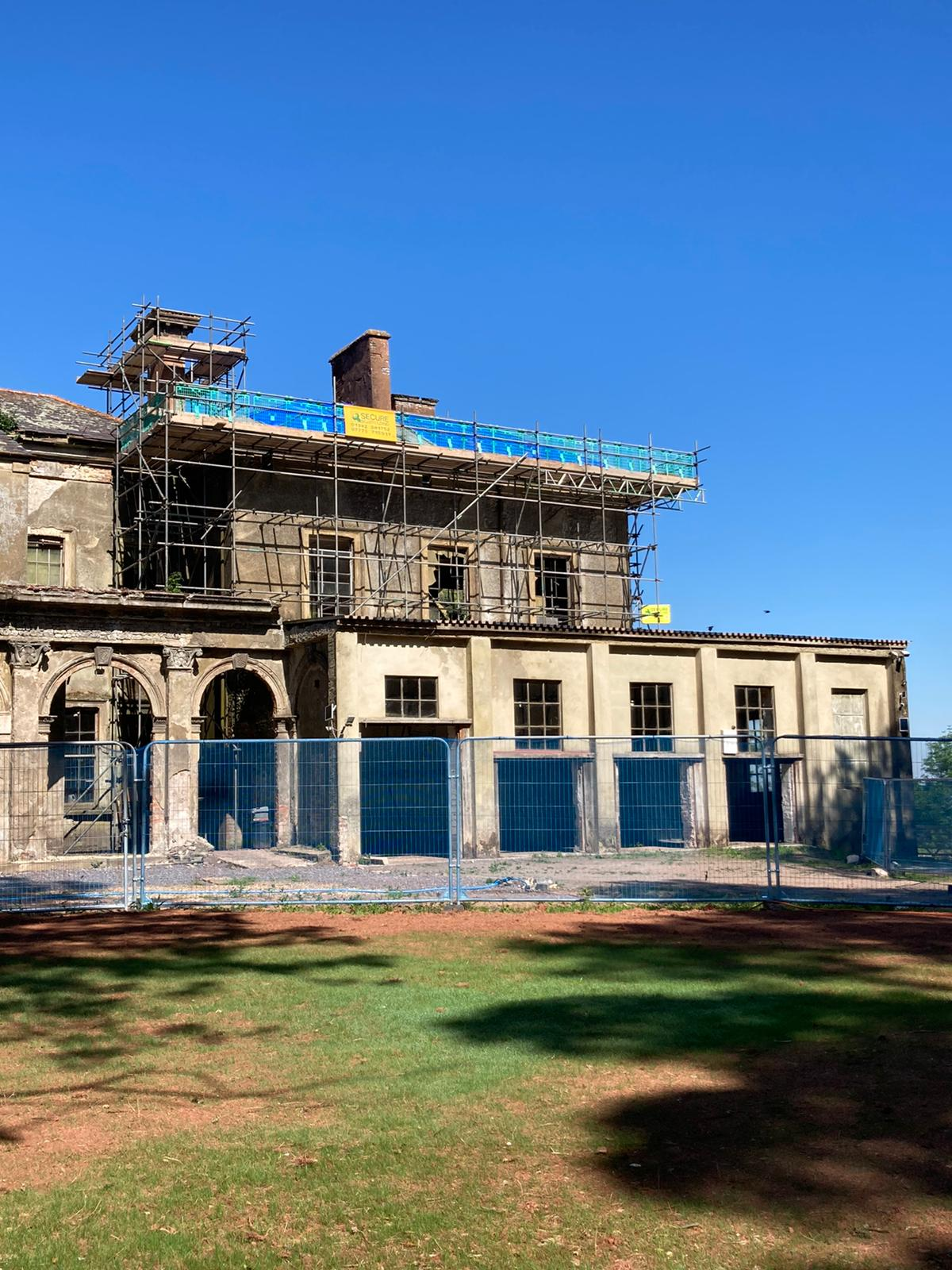
Blackborough House during restoration in 2021

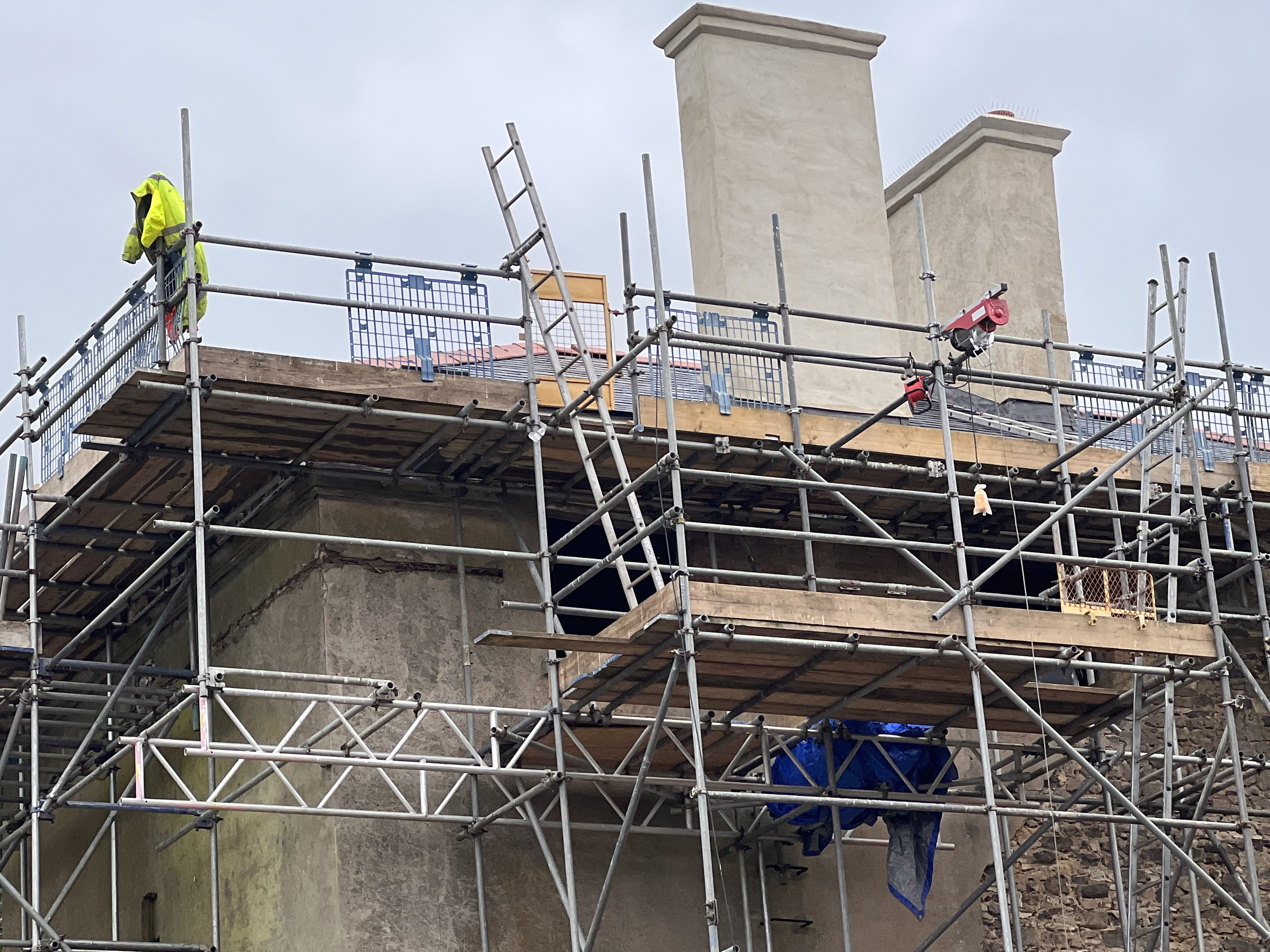
Blackborough House during restoration in 2022

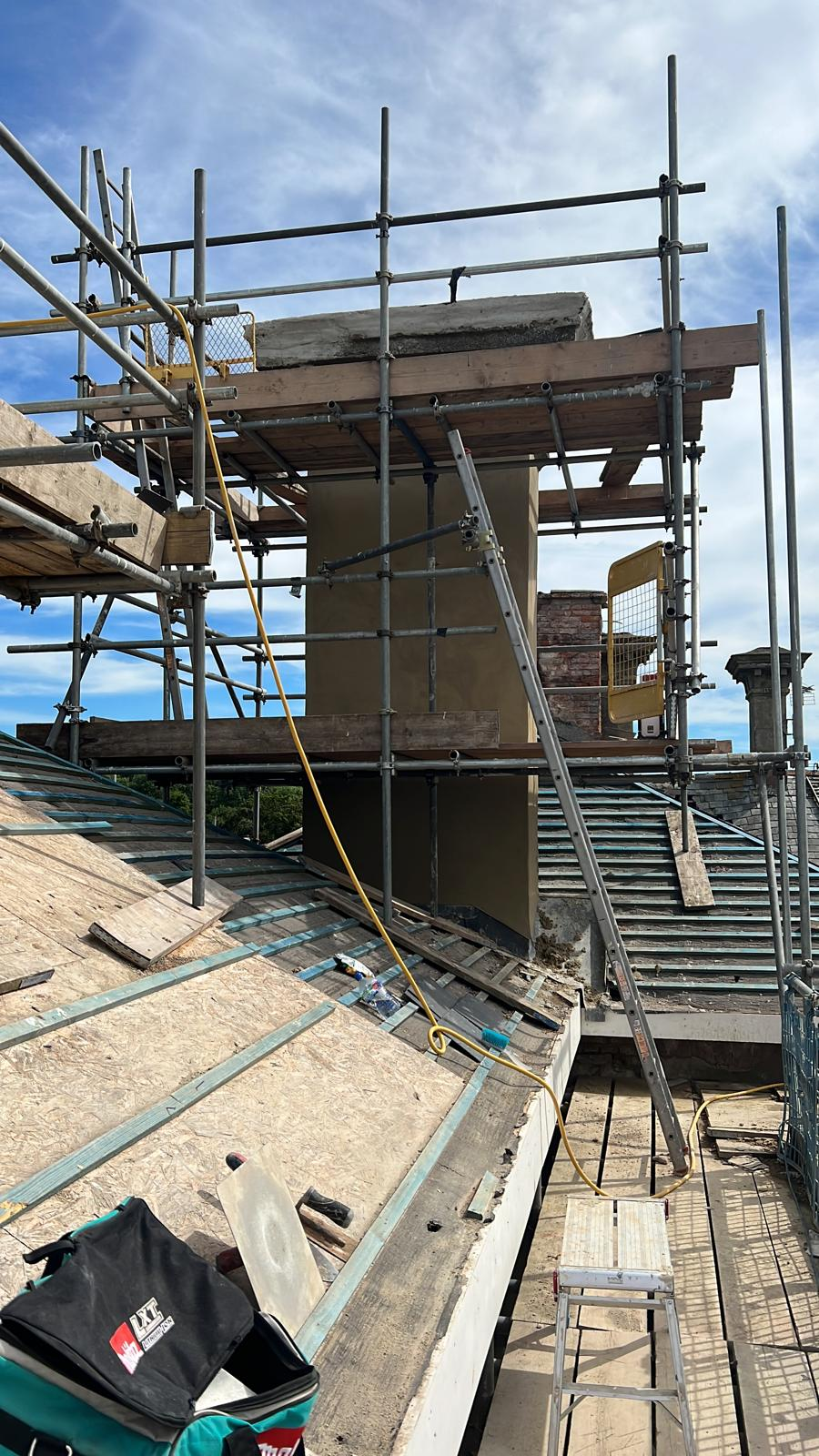
Blackborough House during restoration in 2022

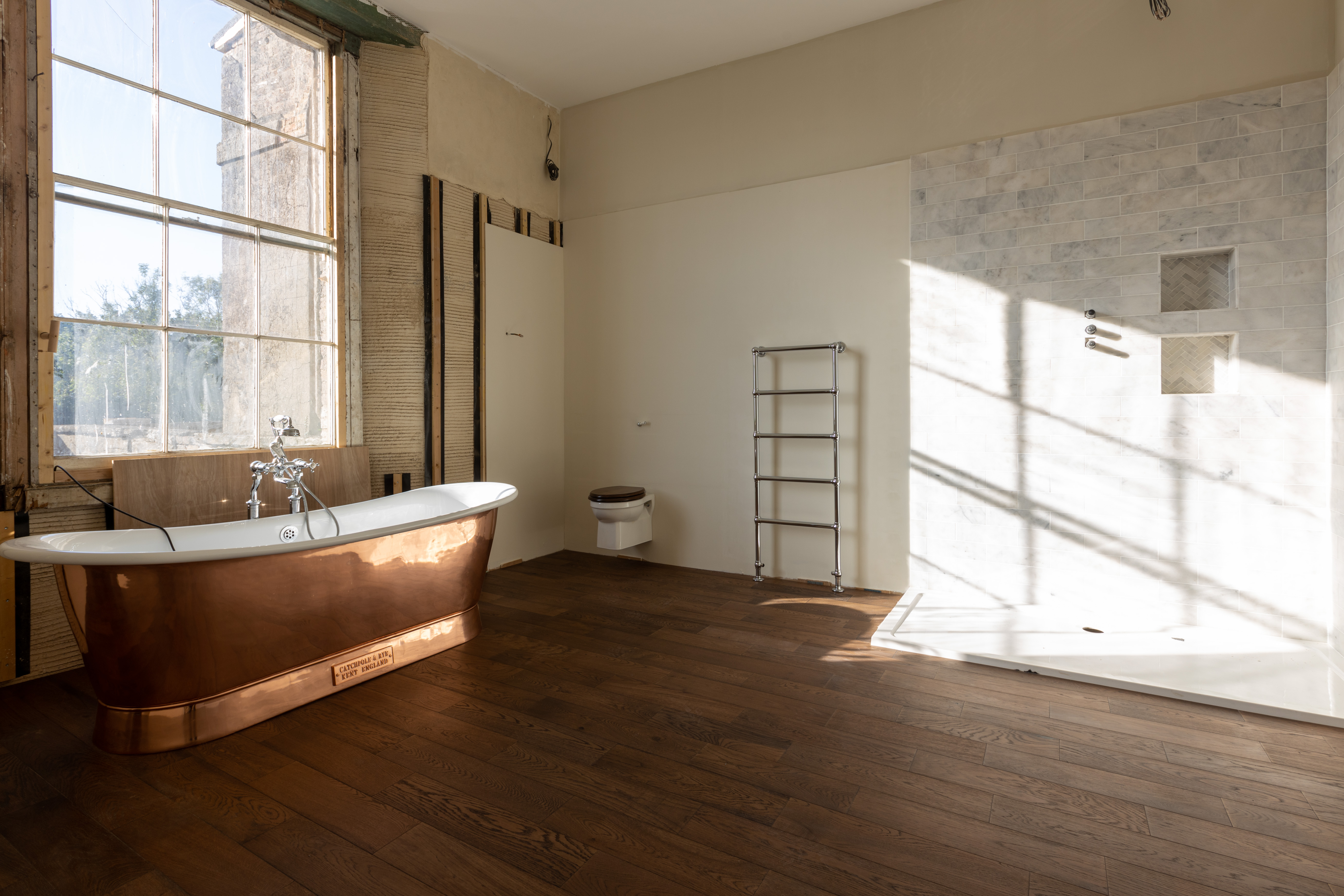
Blackborough House during restoration in 2022. New bathroom.

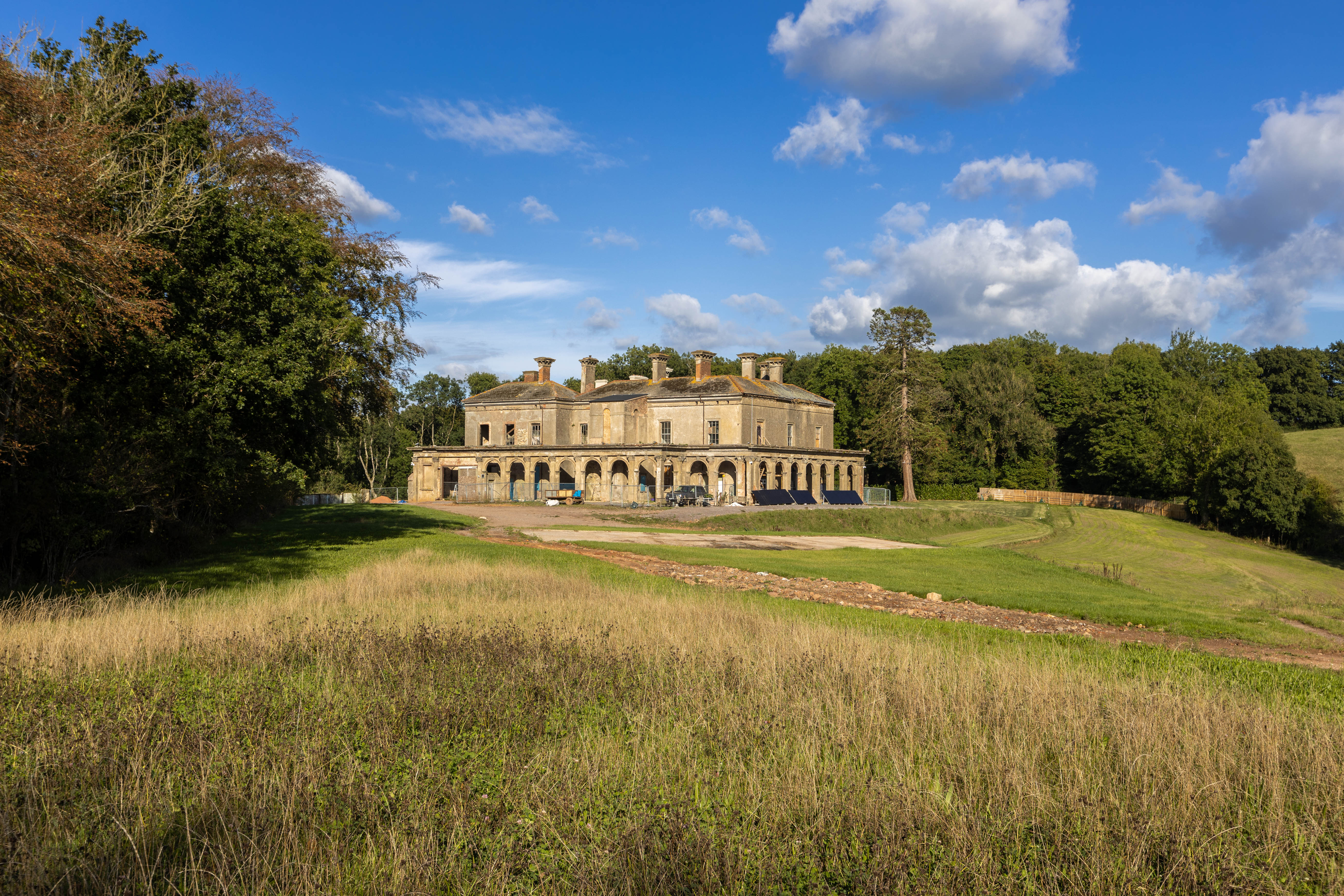
Blackborough House in 2022

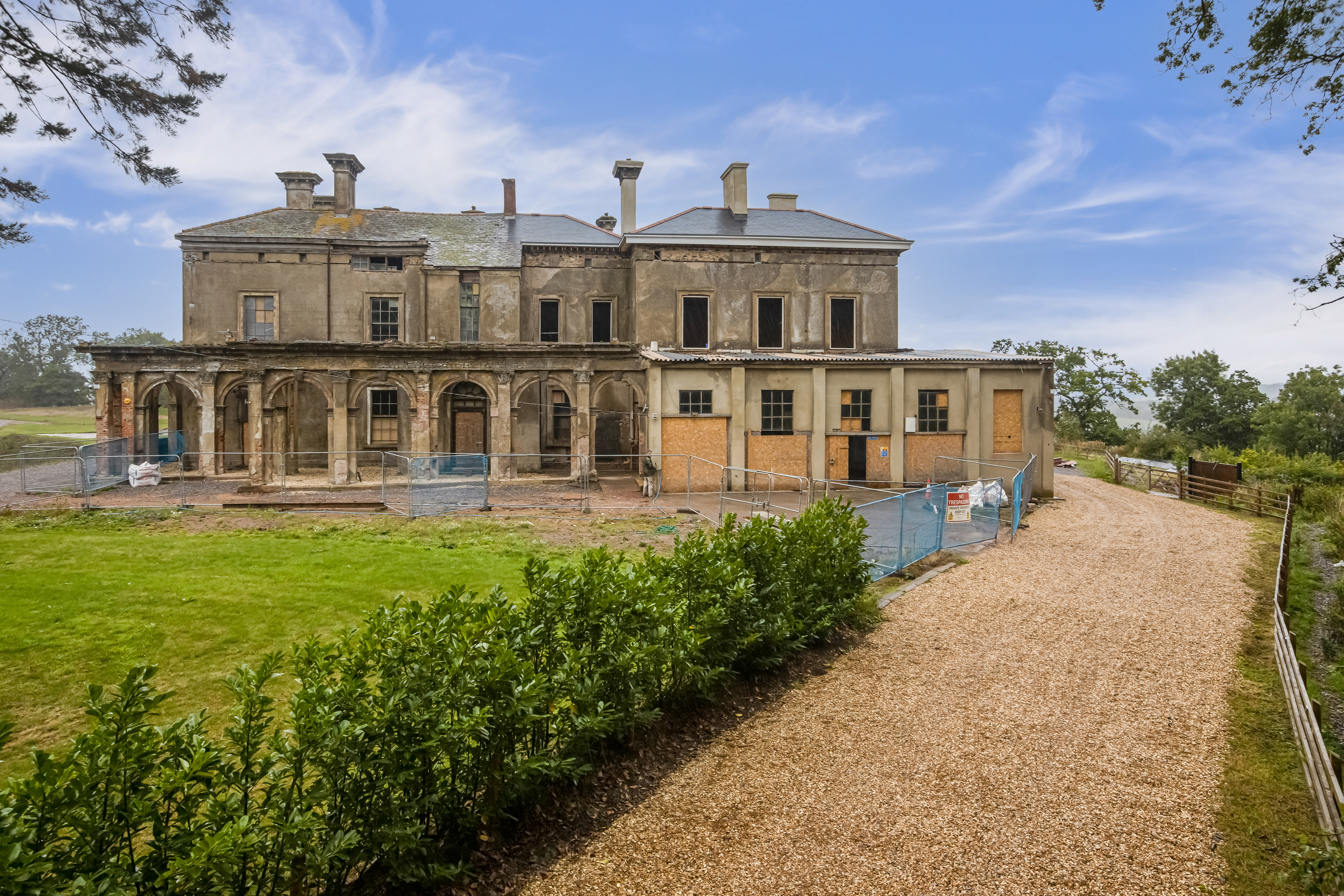

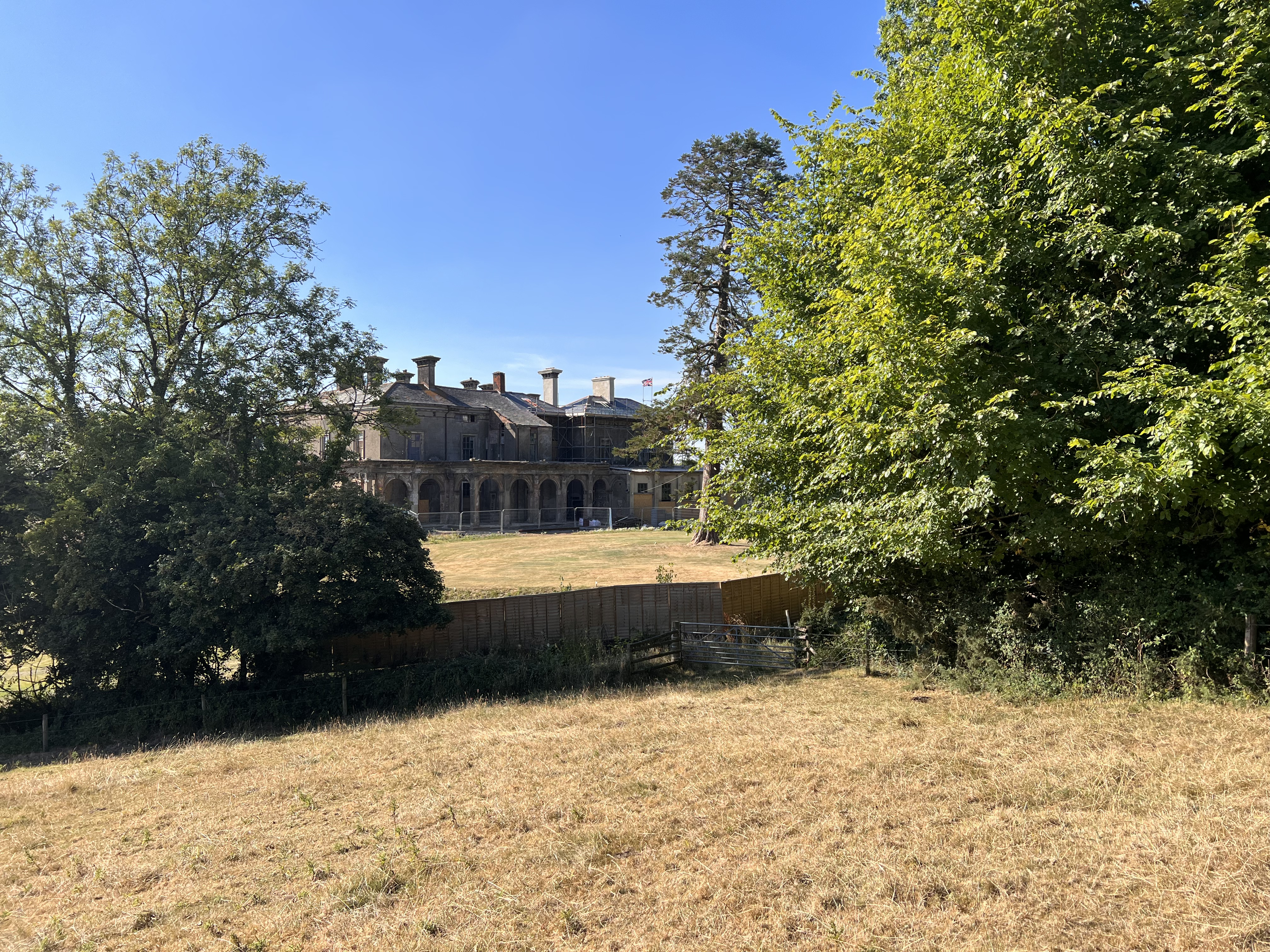
Blackborough House view of East Wing

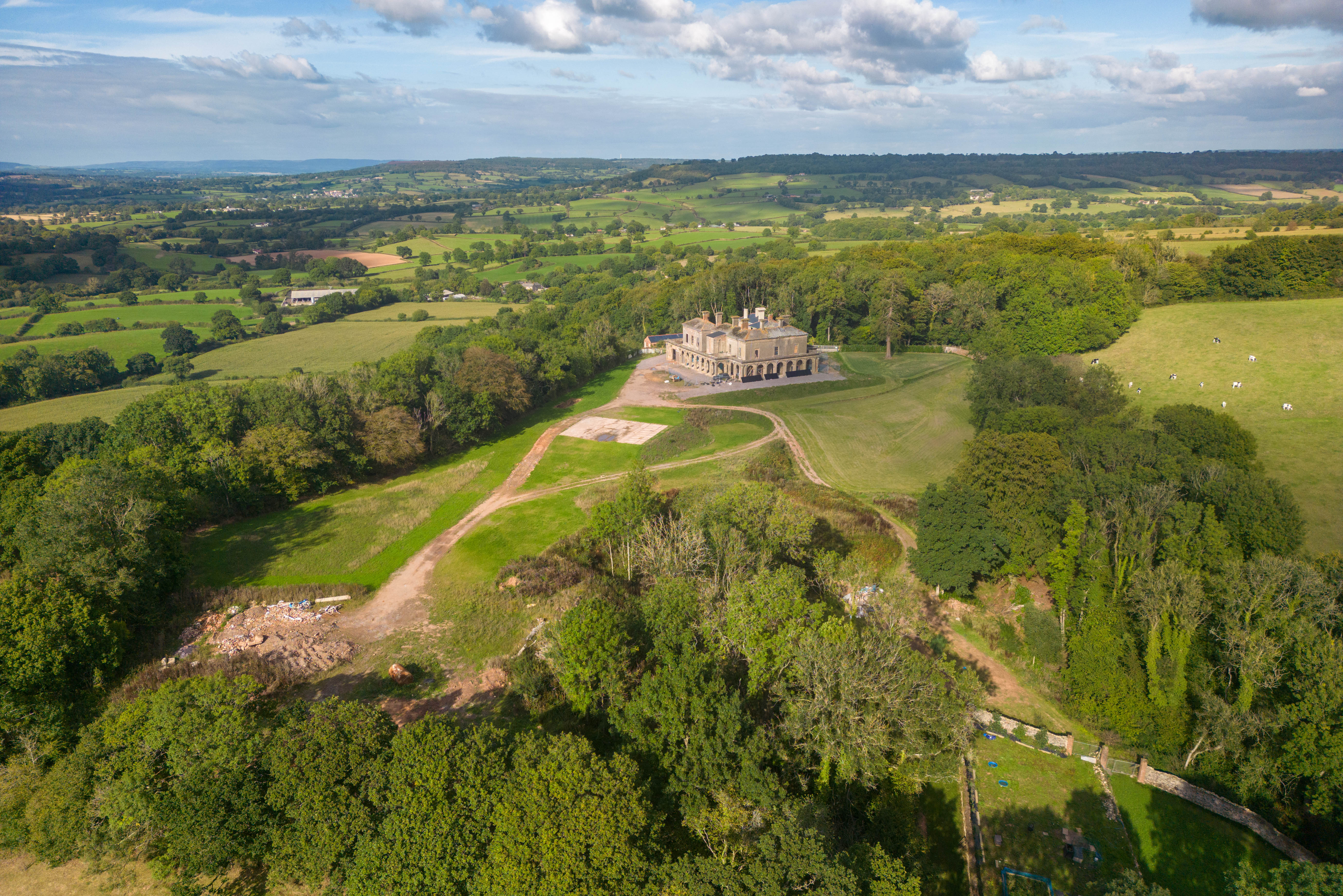
Blackborough House by drone 2022

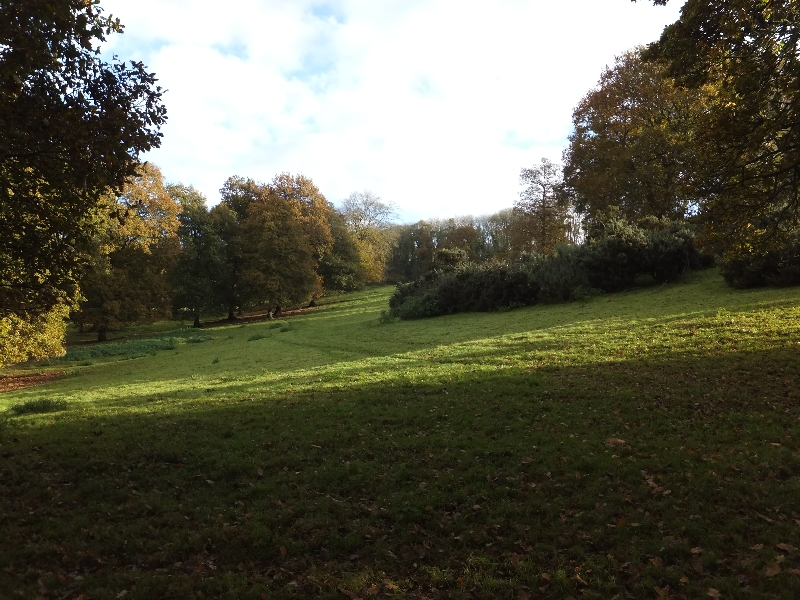
Blackborough House Parkland

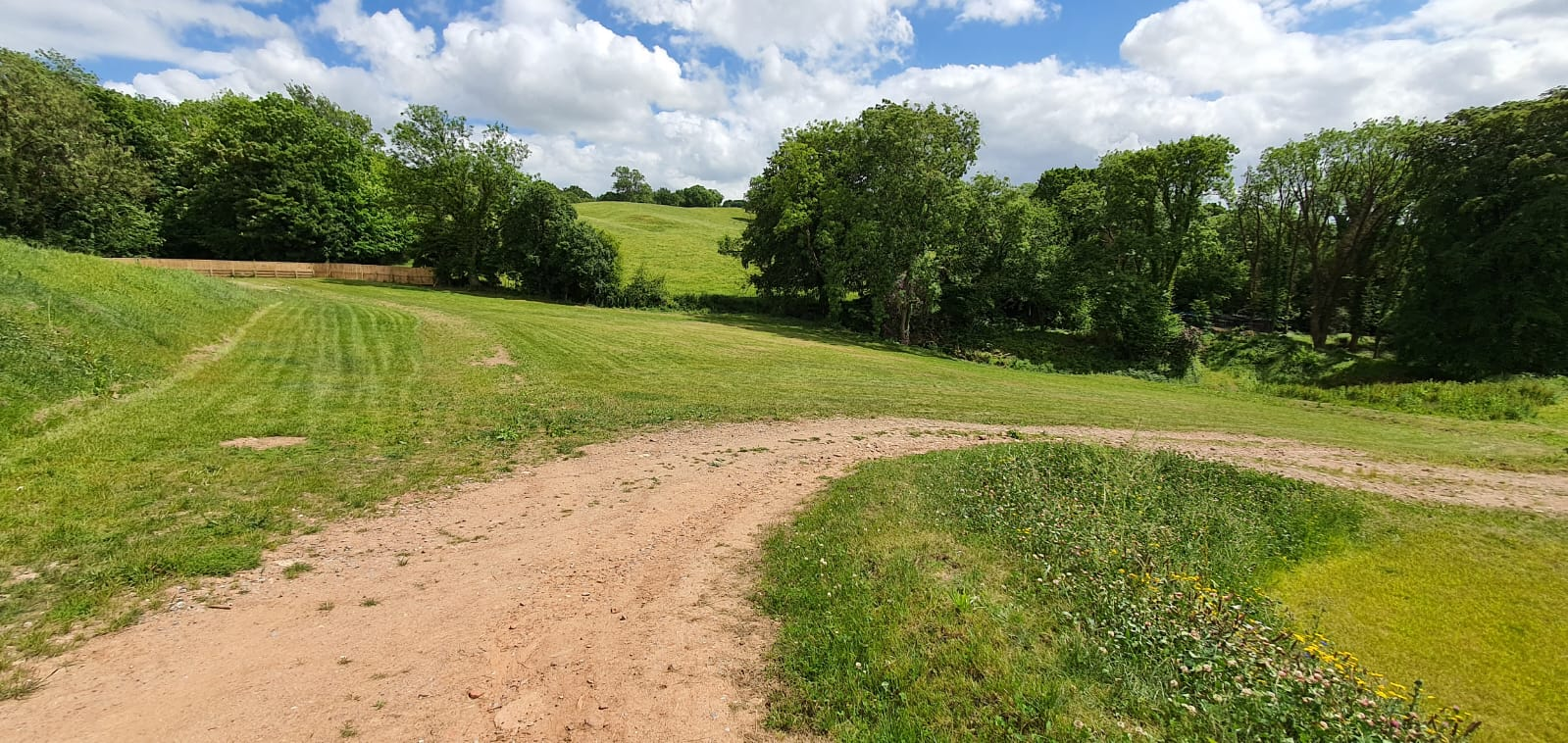
Blackborough House South Lawn
