= Ben Palmer =

British film and television director (born 1976)

- Born: 1976 (age 49–50); Penny Bridge, Barrow-in-Furness, England
- Education: Chetwynde School
- Occupations: Film director, television director
- Years active: 2002–present
- Notable work: Bo' Selecta! The Inbetweeners; The Inbetweeners Movie; Man Up; Breeders

Ben Palmer (born 1976) is a British film and television director. His television credits include the Channel 4 sketch show Bo' Selecta! (2002–2006), the second and third series of the E4 sitcom The Inbetweeners (2009–2010) and the Sky Atlantic comedy-drama Breeders (2020). Palmer has also directed films such as the Inbetweeners spin-off, The Inbetweeners Movie (2011) and the romantic comedy Man Up (2015).

== Early life and education ==
Palmer was born and raised in Penny Bridge, Barrow-in-Furness. He attended Chetwynde School.

== Career ==
Palmer's first directing job was the Channel 4 sketch show Bo' Selecta!, which he co-developed with its main star, Leigh Francis. Palmer directed the second and third series of the E4 sitcom The Inbetweeners in 2009 and 2010, respectively. He then directed its film adaptation.

In 2024, he directed the ITV1 comedy-drama series Douglas Is Cancelled.

== Filmography ==
- Bo' Selecta! (2002–06)
- Comedy Lab (2004–2010)
- Bo! in the USA (2006)
- The Inbetweeners (2009–2010)
- The Inbetweeners Movie (2011)
- Comedy Showcase (2012)
- Milton Jones's House of Rooms (2012)
- Them from That Thing (2012)
- Bad Sugar (2012)
- Chickens (2013)
- London Irish (2013)
- Man Up (2015)
- SunTrap (2015)
- BBC Comedy Feeds (2016)
- Nigel Farage Gets His Life Back (2016)
- Back (2017)
- Comedy Playhouse (2017)
- Urban Myths (2017–19)
- Click & Collect (2018)
- Semi-Detached (2019)
- Breeders (2020)
- Douglas Is Cancelled (2024)
- Number 10 (upcoming)
