= The Inbetweeners (American TV series) =

- Genre: Sitcom
- Based on: The Inbetweeners by Damon Beesley and Iain Morris
- Developed by: Brad Copeland
- Showrunner: Brad Copeland
- Starring: Joey Pollari; Bubba Lewis; Zack Pearlman; Mark L. Young; Alex Frnka
- Narrated by: Joey Pollari
- Theme music composer: OK Go
- Opening theme: "This Too Shall Pass"
- Country of origin: United States
- Original language: English
- No. of seasons: 1
- No. of episodes: 12

Production
- Executive producers: Aaron Kaplan; Brad Copeland; Clay Spencer; Damon Beesley; Iain Morris; Jennifer Russakoff; Justin Levi
- Camera setup: Single-camera
- Running time: 30 minutes
- Production companies: Bwark Productions; Kapital Entertainment; Brad Copeland Productions; MTV Production Development

Original release
- Network: MTV
- Release: August 20 – November 5, 2012

The Inbetweeners is an American television sitcom developed by Brad Copeland for MTV. The show stars Joey Pollari, Bubba Lewis, Mark L. Young, Zack Pearlman, Alex Frnka and Brett Gelman. The show is a remake of the original British series of the same name written and created by Damon Beesley and Iain Morris, who served as executive producers alongside Copeland, Aaron Kaplan and Lauren Corra. It ran on MTV from August 20 to November 5, 2012. On November 28, 2012, the series was canceled after one season, due to poor ratings and reviews.

== Main cast ==
- Joey Pollari as Will McKenzie
- Bubba Lewis as Simon Cooper
- Alex Frnka as Carli D'Amato
- Zack Pearlman as Jay Cartwright
- Mark L. Young as Neil Sutherland

== Production ==
After an unsuccessful attempt by ABC to create an American version of The Inbetweeners in 2008, MTV announced in late-September 2010 that it had hired noted comedy writer Brad Copeland (known for writing on American comedies such as Arrested Development and My Name Is Earl) to write the script for an American Inbetweeners series. Taika Waititi was chosen to direct the pilot.

On 31 March 2011, MTV officially announced that it had picked up The Inbetweeners for an additional eleven episodes, creating a twelve-episode first season. Copeland served as executive producer and showrunner.

In November 2012, MTV had decided not to go ahead with a planned second season of the American remake. MTV said to The Wrap, "While we won't be moving forward with another season of The Inbetweeners, we enjoyed working with the show's creators and such a talented, funny cast."

== Episodes ==
| No. | Title | Directed by | Written by | Original release date | US viewers (millions) |
|---|---|---|---|---|---|
| 1 | "Pilot" | Taika Waititi | Teleplay by : Brad Copeland | August 20, 2012 | 0.91 |
Will McKenzie is a new student at Grove High, a suburban public school. He has transferred from a private school due to his mother not having enough money for his private school fees because his father left his mother for his much younger secretary. Will has three new friends: Simon Cooper, Jay Cartwright and Neil Sutherland - all four are unpopular virgins who want to gain popularity and improve their sex lives. At Jay's suggestion, the group skip school and Will buys vodka from a liquor store which they drink. Simon spray paints I Love Carly D'Amato on the drive in front of the house of Carly, whom he has been attracted to since they were both eight. She invites him to her house that evening when her parents will be out. He brings Will, but the duo leave after a drunken Simon vomits over Carly's eight-year-old brother and Will scares the child by talking to him about terrorism. Simon's parents and Will's mother confront their sons after their wrongdoing; Will claims that he skipped school due to being bullied. This episode is based on First Day and Bunk Off - the first two episodes of the original UK series.
| 2 | "Sunshine Mountain" | Taika Waititi | Teleplay by : Brad Copeland | August 27, 2012 | 0.65 |
| 3 | "Club Code" | Todd Strauss-Schulson | Teleplay by : Daniel Sweren-Becker; Story by : Daniel Sweren-Becker | September 3, 2012 | 0.67 |
| 4 | "The Wrong Box" | Taika Waititi | John Levenstein | September 10, 2012 | 0.57 |
| 5 | "The Masters" | Taika Waititi | Cody Heller & Brett Konner | September 17, 2012 | 0.53 |
| 6 | "Class Clown" | Todd Strauss-Schulson | Ryan Ridley | September 24, 2012 | 0.52 |
| 7 | "Crystal Springs" | Todd Strauss-Schulson | Teleplay by : J. Michael Feldman & Debbie Jhoon | October 1, 2012 | 0.53 |
| 8 | "The Field Trip" | Taika Waititi | Teleplay by : Monica Padrick | October 8, 2012 | 0.53 |
| 9 | "Fire!" | Michael Blieden | John Levenstein | October 15, 2012 | 0.65 |
| 10 | "Reading Gives You Wings" | Michael Blieden | Teleplay by : Marisa Pinson; Story by : Marisa Pinson | October 22, 2012 | 0.55 |
| 11 | "Spa Time" | Michael Blieden | Debbie Jhoon & J. Michael Feldman | October 29, 2012 | 0.62 |
| 12 | "The Dance" | Iain Morris | Teleplay by : Brad Copeland | November 5, 2012 | 0.66 |

== Critical reception ==
The series was panned by critics. However, on Metacritic the series has a score of 62 out of 100 based on 9 reviews, indicating "generally favourable reviews". The American version is extremely unpopular with viewers from the UK, with many newspapers reporting that it had "flopped". It was listed by Metro as one of the "Top 10 British comedies whose US remakes have flopped".

== Cancelled film adaptation ==
On July 3, 2012, it was announced that a American adaptation of The Inbetweeners Movie was in the works. Morris and Beesley were approached by Paramount Pictures to lead the project. However, following the cancellation of the series, the film was never produced.

On August 22, 2013, Jim Field Smith was initially revealed to be directing the American adaptation of the British film, then titled Virgins America, but as of 2026, no further developments have taken place. Whether Morris and Beesley had any involvement with the project is unknown.
