= Failsafe (UK band) =

English rock band

- Origin: Preston, England
- Genres: Alternative rock, post-hardcore
- Years active: 2000–2015
- Labels: Small Town Records (UK); Fond Of Life (Europe)
- Past members: James Norris; Simon Humphries; Rob Catlow; Andy Sprake; Matthew Cogley; Scott Bampton
- Website: Official website

Failsafe were an English melodic rock band formed in 2000. They are based in and around Preston, Lancashire, England. They released three albums independently, with their third produced by Dave Eringa.

== History ==
=== Beginnings ===
Based in the north-west England city of Preston, the various members brought their own individual influences and styles to the band. Forming in spring 2000, the school friends were originally known as Duck Hunt after the NES game.

After a number of line-up changes, the band began to tour, sharing the stage with the likes of Paramore, Cute Is What We Aim For, A Wilhelm Scream, Idlewild, The Bouncing Souls, Flogging Molly, Boysetsfire, Allister, Rx Bandits, Belvedere, Capdown, Failure By Design, The Aquabats, Spunge, A Day To Remember, Armor for Sleep, Anti-Flag and Phinius Gage.

The debut album, What We Are Today, was released late in 2005 and received positive reviews from magazines like Metal Hammer, Kerrang! and Big Cheese.

In 2007 Failsafe recorded a live session at Maida Vale for the BBC which was aired on the Mike Davies Rock Show on 17 October 2007. The three tracks were Fire At Will, Cut To The Chase and Unity In Progress.

Tipped for success in 2008 by the NME, who classed them as a "genuinely killer live band with huge choruses and breakneck riffs.". The band received a full page feature in Kerrang magazine in August 2008 and stated that they were keen to capture the energetic feel familiar to their lives shows. The photoshoot was done by legendary rock photographer Scarlet Page, daughter of Led Zeppelin guitarist Jimmy Page.

Failsafe played as backing band for MC Lars for 2008's Give It A Name festival and on his April 2009 UK tour in support of his album This Gigantic Robot Kills. In August 2010, they played at the Hevy Music Festival near Folkestone.

=== The Truth Is... ===
In January 2008, the band went to Sandhill Studios in Liverpool to record their second album entitled The Truth Is.... The album was produced by Pete Miles (who also produced What We Are Today). Remixing and mastering was done in the Summer of 2008 before the band agreed independent record deals with Small Town Records in the UK and Fond Of Life Records in Europe.

On 20 August 2008, a blog on the band's Myspace page detailed the release of the album. The official release date was mentioned to be 10 November 2008 but the band stated that: "We will have the record to sell at all gigs starting with our european dates in September." The Truth Is... was released on 10 November 2008.

On 7 June 2009, Failsafe released "A Common Goal" as download only single through Small Town Records & Bomber Music. B-Sides include "Only If We Learn" and two live session tracks recorded for Xfm.

The band's second single proper was accompanied by a video which received regular rotation on Kerrang TV. Tim Fox directed the video which was recorded in Camberwell South London and featured imagery similar in style to the album artwork for The Truth Is...

After stamping their mark on SXSW in Texas during 2010 the band also filmed for the third series of the smash hit Channel 4/E4 TV show The Inbetweeners featuring as the band from the episode "The Gig and the Girlfriend".

=== Routines ===
Failsafe released their third album titled Routines in the USA on 3 April 2012. It was released under Cardboard Empire, a record label founded and owned by the band members of an American post-hardcore band, Hawthorne Heights. Failsafe toured for this album with Super Prime, Forever Came Calling, Hawthorne Heights, and a number of unnamed local bands on the Summer of Hope Tour, for Hawthorne Height's new EP titled Hope. In the early hours of 1 January 2015 guitarist and vocalist Matthew Cogley died suddenly while on a vacation in Belfast. His cause of death was not released.

=== WYRES ===
In March 2020, Sprake, Catlow and Humphries formed a new band called WYRES, along with original Failsafe bass guitarist Scott Bampton. WYRES released debut album Nothing Like Your Idols on 6 October 2023.

== Members ==
- James Norris – lead vocals, synthesisers
- Simon Humphries – guitars
- Rob Catlow – drums
- Andy Sprake – bass guitar, vocals, keyboards

Former members

- Matthew Cogley – guitars, lead vocals (died 2015)
- Scott Bampton – bass guitar

== Discography ==
Year	Album	Label
2005	What We Are Today	Deck Cheese
2008	The Truth Is...	Small Town (UK) / Fond Of Life (Europe)
2009	What We Are Today (Remastered)	Bomber Music
2012	Routines	Cardboard Empire
