= List of The Inbetweeners characters =

This is a list of characters from the British sitcom The Inbetweeners, which ran for three series from 2008 to 2010 on E4. A 2011 film was also released, followed by a sequel in 2014.

== Cast ==
Character	TV series			Films		Special
Character	Series 1 (2008)	Series 2 (2009)	Series 3 (2010)	The Inbetweeners Movie (2011)	The Inbetweeners 2 (2014)	The Inbetweeners: Fwends Reunited (2019)
Main
Will McKenzie	Simon Bird	Simon Bird	Simon Bird	Simon Bird	Simon Bird	Simon Bird
Simon Cooper	Joe Thomas	Joe Thomas	Joe Thomas	Joe Thomas	Joe Thomas	Joe Thomas
Jay Cartwright	James Buckley	James Buckley	James Buckley	James Buckley	James Buckley	James Buckley
Neil Sutherland	Blake Harrison	Blake Harrison	Blake Harrison	Blake Harrison	Blake Harrison	Blake Harrison
Family
Polly McKenzie	Belinda Stewart-Wilson	Belinda Stewart-Wilson	Belinda Stewart-Wilson	Belinda Stewart-Wilson	Belinda Stewart-Wilson	Belinda Stewart-Wilson
Mr McKenzie				Anthony Head		
Pamela Cooper	Robin Weaver	Robin Weaver	Robin Weaver	Robin Weaver	Robin Weaver	
Alan Cooper	Martin Trenaman	Martin Trenaman	Martin Trenaman	Martin Trenaman	Martin Trenaman	
Andrew Cooper	Dominic Applewhite	Dominic Applewhite	Dominic Applewhite			
Terry Cartwright	David Schaal	David Schaal	David Schaal	David Schaal	David Schaal	
Mrs Cartwright	Victoria Willing	Victoria Willing	Victoria Willing	Victoria Willing		
Uncle Bryan					David Field	
Kevin Sutherland	Alex Macqueen	Alex Macqueen	Alex Macqueen	Alex Macqueen	Alex Macqueen	
Katie Sutherland		Kacey Barnfield	Kacey Barnfield			
Other
Mr Gilbert	Greg Davies	Greg Davies	Greg Davies	Greg Davies	Greg Davies	Greg Davies
Carli D'Amato	Emily Head	Emily Head	Emily Head	Emily Head		
Mark Donovan	Henry Lloyd-Hughes	Henry Lloyd-Hughes	Henry Lloyd-Hughes	Henry Lloyd-Hughes		
Charlotte Hinchcliffe	Emily Atack	Emily Atack	Emily Atack			
John Webster	John Seaward	John Seaward	John Seaward	John Seaward		
Tara Brown			Hannah Tointon			

== Main characters ==
=== Will McKenzie ===
Will McKenzie
- The Inbetweeners character
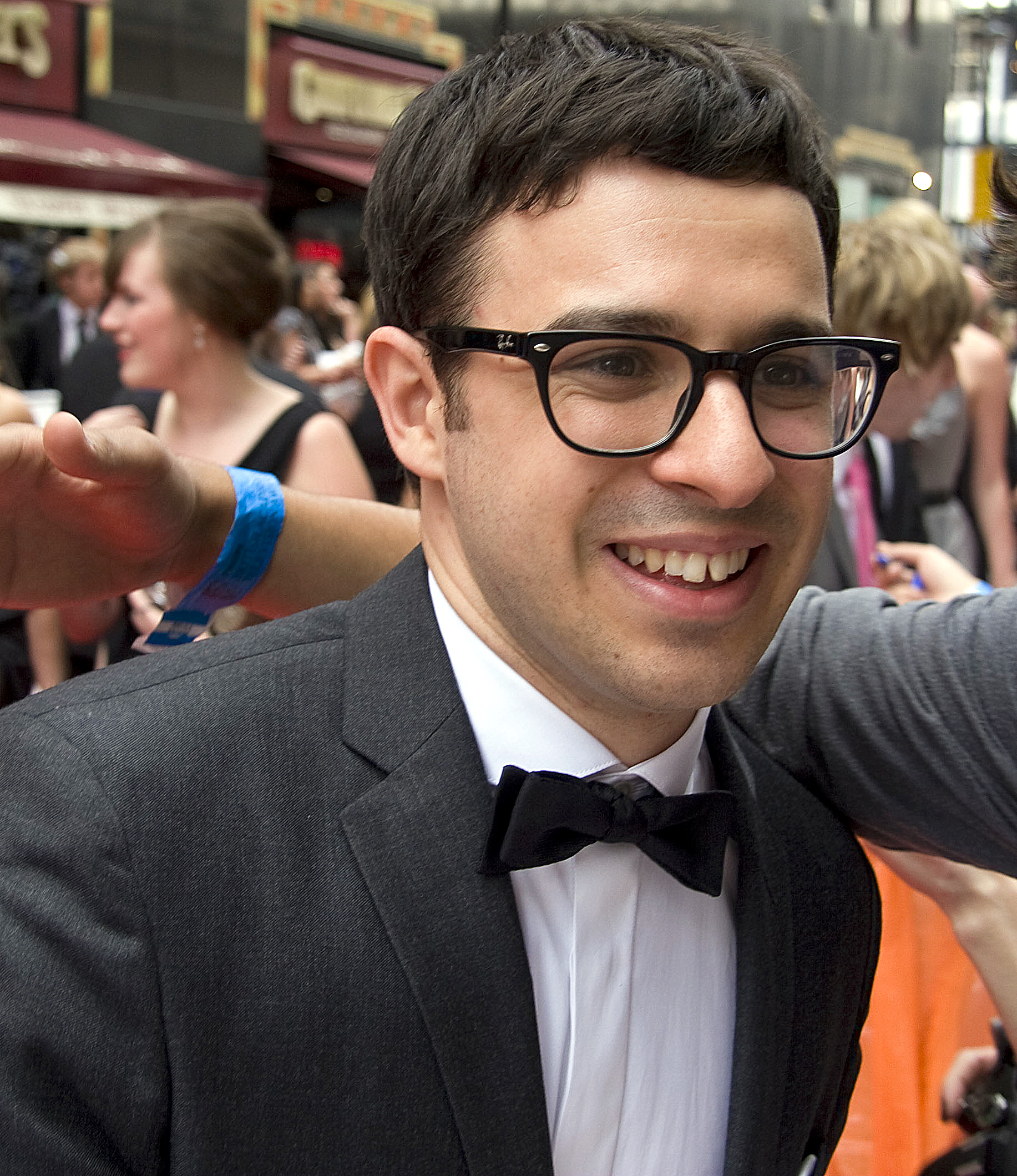
- Simon Bird plays Will
- First appearance: "First Day" (2008)
- Created by: Damon Beesley; Iain Morris
- Portrayed by: Simon Bird

In-universe information
- Occupation: Student
- Family: Polly McKenzie (mother); Mr McKenzie (father)
- Significant others: Alison; Charlotte Hinchcliffe; Daisy

William McKenzie is the central character and narrator of the show. In the pilot episode, Will begins his first day in his new school, Rudge Park Comprehensive, dressed in a suit and carrying a briefcase, leading to him being nicknamed "Briefcase Wanker" amongst other vulgar variations. For his portrayal as Will, Bird has won the 2008 British Comedy Award for Best Male Newcomer and the 2009 British Comedy Award for Best Actor. He was also nominated for Best Comedy Performance at the 2008 Royal Television Society Awards, and Best Male Performance in a Comedy Programme at the 2009 BAFTA Awards.

Will had previously been educated at a private school and is shown to be extremely out of place in the rougher comprehensive school environment. Although he is the most intelligent of the group, he becomes easily jealous and habitually launches into foul-mouthed rants when he becomes annoyed, often getting himself and his friends into trouble or awkward situations. Will often has trouble engaging with girls, generally panicking and overthinking in situations where he could end up having sex; as a running joke, Neil often ends up hooking up with the girl Will desired instead. He is shown to be very emotionally dependent on his mother, Polly, despite her continually being a source of embarrassment for him in front of others. Much to Will's agitation, his friends (particularly Jay and Neil) and others are attracted to her, and do not hesitate to make open remarks about it.

Will often finds himself the target of bullying in school, partly through Mark Donovan (with such acts as taping him to a chair and placing a bin on his head) but mainly through embarrassment and belittlement from his sardonic Head of Sixth Form, Mr Gilbert. Despite Will's conscientious attitude towards him, Gilbert often goes out of his way to make Will's time at school miserable.

After his many mishaps in the series, romantic or otherwise, in the first film Will joins his friends on a lads' holiday to Malia, Crete where he meets and forms a genuine relationship with Alison. However, at the start of the second film, it is revealed that their relationship has ended.

=== Jay Cartwright ===
Jay Cartwright
- The Inbetweeners character
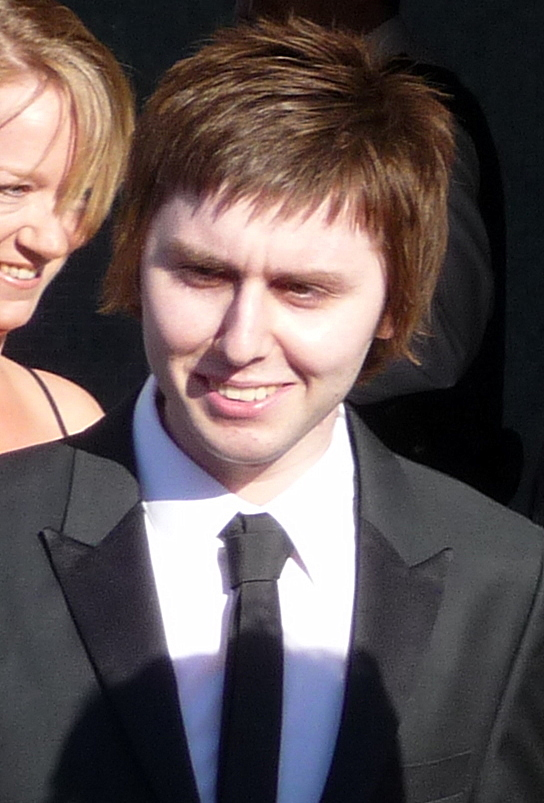
- James Buckley plays Jay
- First appearance: 'First Day' (2008)
- Created by: Damon Beesley; Iain Morris
- Portrayed by: James Buckley

In-universe information
- Family: Terry Cartwright (father); Mrs Cartwright (mother)
- Significant others: Chloe; Jane
- Relatives: Uncle Bryan

Jay Cartwright, the youngest of the four protagonists, is crass, immature, untrustworthy and obsessed with sex, with almost all his comments concerning the subject. He frequently lies and exaggerates (often to an outrageous extent) about his supposed experiences – sexual and otherwise – often making crude comments about women and offering highly incorrect advice to his friends to lift his ego and sabotage their chances; he also frequently uses words such as "clunge" and "snatch" to describe women's genitalia. In reality, he is the least sexually experienced of the group, lacks confidence and frequently relies on pornography to attain gratification, as he finds it difficult to converse with girls. When he does enter a relationship with Chloe in "Exam Time", owing to his insecurities and lack of experience, he follows extremely poor advice from his father by bombarding her with texts and calls, the pressure of which leads her to end the relationship. His father also often openly contradicts Jay's claims and humiliates him in front of his friends (and even their parents) stating that Jay has zero success with women and is in fact a "loser". This treatment drives Jay to appear more experienced and impressive than he actually is.

In "Xmas Party", Jay opens up to John Webster, admitting that many of his stories are exaggerated because he is afraid of being ignored by his peers. However, he quickly throws this side of him away when Samantha, a girl possessing many similar characteristics to Jay, shows interest in him. He seldom performs any acts of kindness and routinely insults even his closest friends, with his comments reaching a more severe level than the insults the rest of the group frequently exchange. In a deleted scene, he even insults Will in German. It is implied in the last episode that Jay may have been sexually abused by his former neighbour; Neil mentions a "game" that Jay and his "weird neighbour" used to play in the garden shed, which Jay denies vehemently.

Jay's only friend who truly likes him is Neil, mostly because he is naïve enough to believe Jay's stories. Another recurring theme of Jay's character is that he often steals things, such as hair removal cream ("Duke of Edinburgh Awards") and a flyer for a house party ("Will's Birthday") from a girl named Sadie Cunningham during registration. He also often gets Simon into trouble for things that he had said or done; for example, Simon is throttled by a man after Jay shouts "bus wankers!" through the car window. By the start of the third series, Jay has supposedly passed his driving test, driving his mum's car. His driving skills are awful, making Will "feel like Princess Diana" and he later reveals that he has in fact not yet passed his test; he is able to drive only on the pretext that Neil is giving him a "lesson".

Jay's idea of a lads' holiday to Malia, Crete, sets up the events of the first film, promising a two-week long "mental holiday full of sun, sea, sex, sand, booze, sex, minge, fanny and tits, and booze, and sex". However, he still experiences little success with women, until he meets Jane (whom he first disregards for being "fat") who can see through his facade. Jay eventually learns to overcome his shallowness and begins a relationship with Jane. He also begins to show a softer side towards his friends in the film, such as buying Simon tickets for the boat party (albeit he rips them up after they fight), displaying sadness that Simon will soon leave for university, and offering a very intoxicated Will his bed for the night in lieu of an ants' nest.

=== Neil Sutherland ===
Neil Sutherland
- The Inbetweeners character
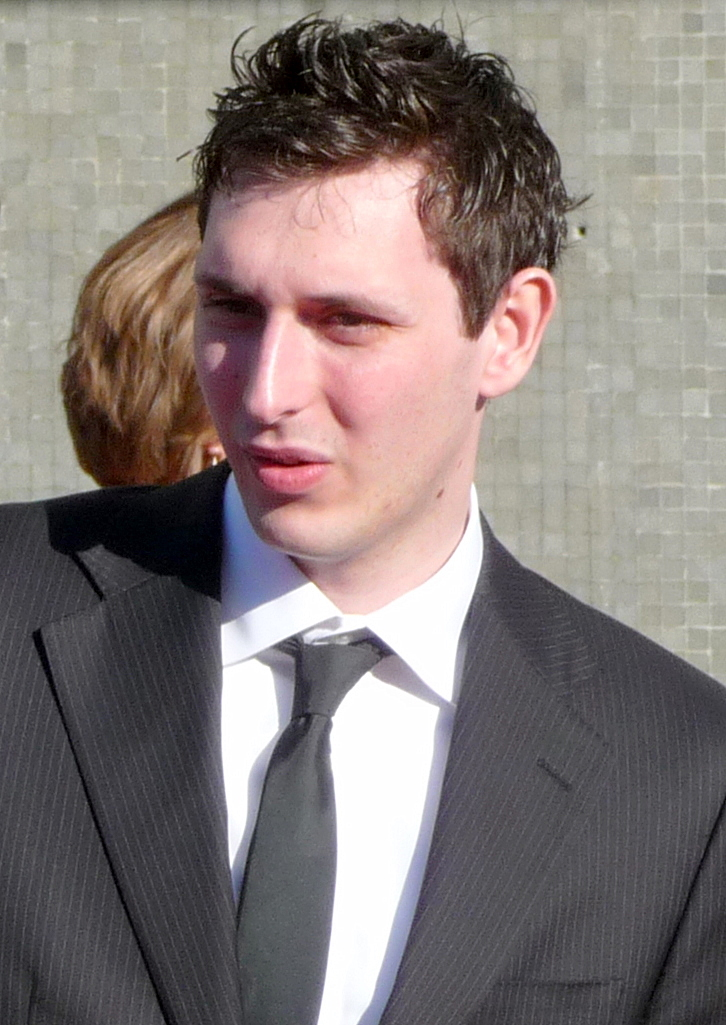
- Blake Harrison plays Neil
- First appearance: 'First Day' (2008)
- Created by: Damon Beesley; Iain Morris
- Portrayed by: Blake Harrison

In-universe information
- Family: Kevin Sutherland (father); Katie Sutherland (sister)
- Significant others: Nicole; Lisa

Neil Lindsay Sutherland is the dull-witted and gentle giant of the group. Owing to his gullibility, he is usually the only person who believes Jay's stories and often fails to understand the sarcasm in Will's one-liners. His friends tease him about his father Kevin allegedly being a closeted homosexual; both Neil and his father strongly deny this. He has, alongside Simon, passed his driving test and owns a modified Vauxhall Nova GSi, but cannot drive it as it does not have an engine. He takes part in the school's version of Blind Date and wins an unwanted date with Susie, one of the school's "freaks". He works at Thorpe Park and also works on-off over the series at Asda. He is a very good dancer, his speciality being "The Robot", and has a crush on his biology teacher, Miss Timms, with his drunken advances toward her in "Xmas Party" ending in humiliation. Despite being naïve, he is well-meaning and laid-back compared to the rest of the group.

Neil is the most sexually experienced of the group owing to his unquestioning and unassuming nature; a recurring theme is that Neil ends up hooking up with women originally fancied by Will. For instance, in "Caravan Club", Will rebuffs the advances of a promiscuous punk girl owing to a lack of romantic sentiment; Neil, however, demonstrates no such concerns, experiencing the same "pushy" approach but accepting it readily, spending a night in Simon's car with her mutually masturbating. He also claims to have snogged and fingered Charlotte Hinchcliffe after Will's brief fling with her, although he informs Will of only the snog to protect his friend's feelings (he tells the other two silently via hand gestures behind Will's back). He also manages to get two blowjobs from Will's dumped date Kerry at his 18th birthday party. Neil also claims to have sexual encounters with unseen female characters on the show, including much older colleague Karen at Asda. In "The Camping Trip", Neil wrongly assumes that he has impregnated her (and dreads having to attend the birth and watch her squeeze the baby "out of her arse"), but receives a text correcting him. He celebrates the fact that he has instead likely contracted chlamydia from her, wrongly believing it to be a good thing. Neil's middle name is revealed to be Lindsay in a deleted scene from series 3, at his 18th birthday party.

Neil has an attractive older sister, Katie, whom the boys stare at when visiting Neil; however, he usually does not get angry or offended by the attention like Will does about his mother, Polly, likely because he is oblivious and laid-back. His father is often shown to be exasperated by Neil's ignorance and on occasion, in an unimpressed tone, remarks "Neil!", or "Oh, Neil!". Other recurring gags include often being correct when it comes to meaningless facts and displaying moments of wisdom despite his dim-wittedness. Neil sometimes hooks up with much older women – he is shown to be surprised when he thinks Karen is pregnant because she told him that she "could not have any more children".

Despite multiple flings throughout the series, Neil is never in a committed relationship until the first film, with a girl named Nicole. However, he cheats on her with older women while on holiday, justifying this through nonsensical "ethics". He then begins a relationship with Lisa, a girl who shares with him these same "ethics" as well as his laid-back nature; he lies to her that he has been dumped by Nicole, only to have to run away when he sees her waiting for him at the airport on his return.

=== Simon Cooper ===
Simon Cooper
- The Inbetweeners character
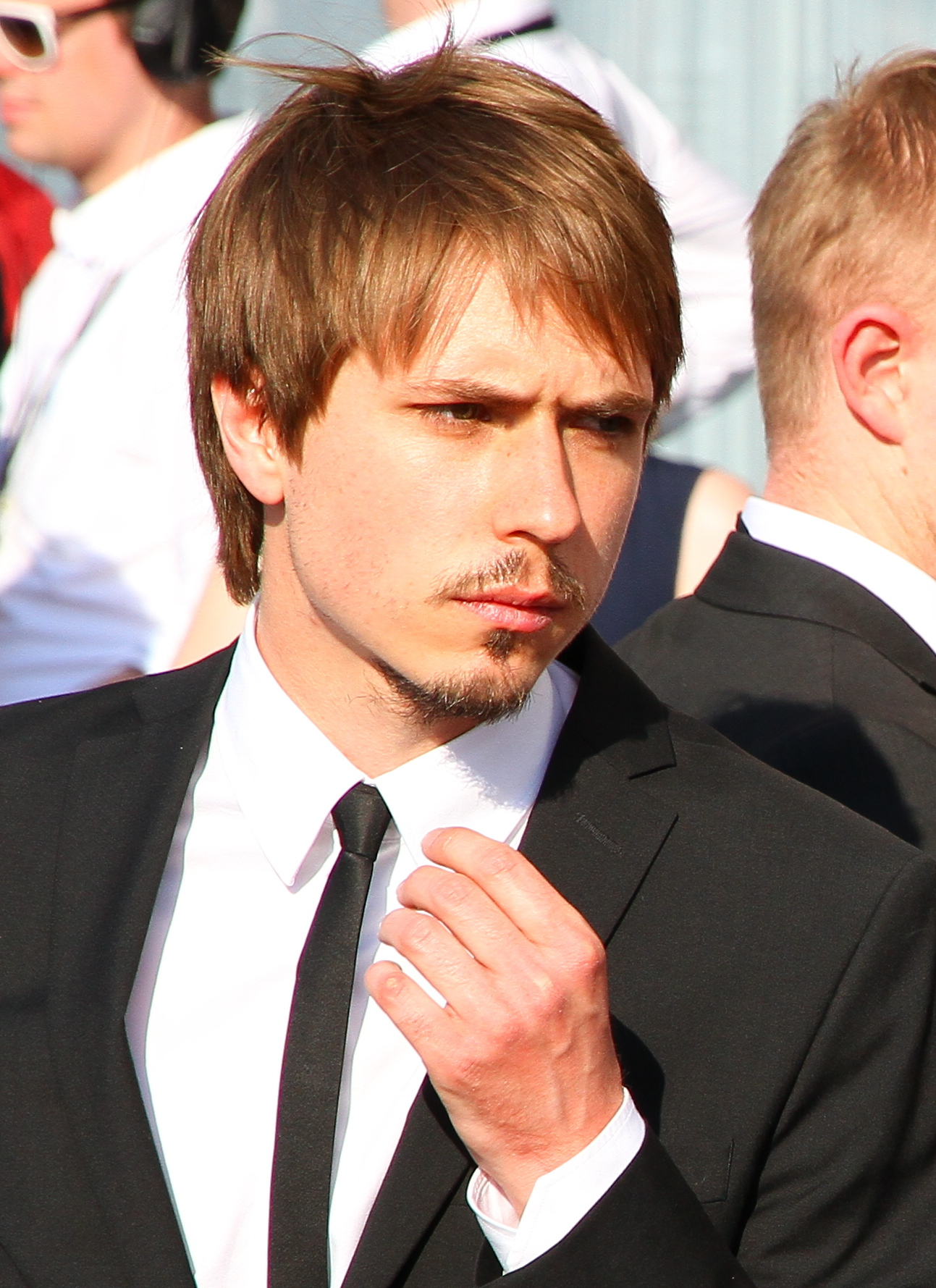
- Joe Thomas plays Simon
- First appearance: 'First Day' (2008)
- Created by: Damon Beesley; Iain Morris
- Portrayed by: Joe Thomas

In-universe information
- Occupation: Student
- Family: Alan Cooper (father); Pamela Cooper (mother); Andrew Cooper (brother)
- Significant others: Carli D'Amato; Tara Brown; Lucy

Simon Cooper is the eldest member of the group. He becomes best friends with Will after initially avoiding him owing to his "actual briefcase", "clumpy shoes" and "gay hair". Simon's first task of the new term is showing Will to his classes – a task assigned by the Head of Sixth Form, Mr Gilbert. Being the eldest, Simon is the first to learn how to drive after passing his driving test in questionable circumstances. His father buys him an old, small and yellow Fiat Cinquecento Hawaii – Simon, Jay, Neil and others think the car is embarrassing and dislike the colour, and mock the fact that it has a tape deck. The car's passenger-side door is ripped off owing to Jay opening it prematurely during an argument while Simon was reversing, and colliding with a signpost at Thorpe Park. However, in "Caravan Club", the door has been replaced with a red one.

Simon has been attracted to his childhood friend Carli D'Amato since they were eight years old. Despite many awkward and humiliating attempts to display his feelings to her – including spray painting "I Love Carli D'Amato" on her driveway – she usually does not reciprocate, partly owing to having a boyfriend, Tom, and partly owing to his occasionally repulsive behaviour, such as drunkenly demanding that she "finger herself in front of [him]" then vomiting over her seven-year-old brother's head in "Bunk Off". However, in "Exam Time", Carli seems interested in Simon after she splits up with her boyfriend Tom, and they kiss while revising for A-levels at Simon's house. Carli agrees to meet Simon at the local pub for a post-exam drink, but when she arrives it is revealed she has reconciled with Tom, much to Simon's disappointment. His parents briefly go on a trial separation in "The Duke of Edinburgh Awards", but reconcile by the end. Arguably, his biggest disaster in front of Carli comes in the series 3 premiere "The Fashion Show"; while taking part in the eponymous show, Simon unwittingly humiliates both himself and Carli when he walks along the catwalk wearing ill-fitting Speedos with a testicle sticking out. His fortunes change in the episode "The Gig and the Girlfriend" in which Simon finally gets a girlfriend, Tara, sharing a passionate kiss at a concert. However, the couple break up at the end of the episode "The Trip to Warwick" after they fail to have sex owing to Simon being unable to get an erection, following unwise advice from Jay.

Simon is the most irritable of the group, especially when in discussions with his family, where he frequently overreacts to gentle goading and even advice. He is sometimes shown to be impulsive and bitter, saying and doing things that cause him great embarrassment. He also gets into a slew of unfortunate situations (often the fault of his friends), such as being physically and verbally attacked, including once by a twelve-year-old; accused of being a "paedophile"; and falling into a freezing harbour. A running gag is that he inadvertently indecently exposes himself while trying to impress girls: waving to Carli (and the rest of the class) naked from the boat in Swanage harbour, exposing his testicle in the fashion show, and rushing naked out of the bedroom at Warwick to show Tara his erection (not realising that her sister and the other three boys are with her). In "The Camping Trip", the boys play a game in which they swap mobile phones and send a text message to a person of their choice on the phone's contact list. Simon later receives a reply from Carli that leaves him with a smile, implying that she feels the same way as Simon and that there is more to come.

Following the events of the series, in the first film Simon and Carli are in a stable relationship by the end of term, Simon claiming this to be "the best year of his life". Abruptly, Carli ends the relationship, leaving him depressed and longing to reconcile the relationship, setting in motion many of the film's events. Despite another girl, Lucy, showing genuine interest in him, he continually rebuffs her and longs for Carli. At the boat party near the film's climax, Simon finally realises that Carli does not reciprocate his feelings (using him to make James, her narcissistic ex-boyfriend, jealous) and instead chooses Lucy.

== Secondary characters ==
=== Mark Donovan ===
- Played by Henry Lloyd-Hughes
- 2008–2011

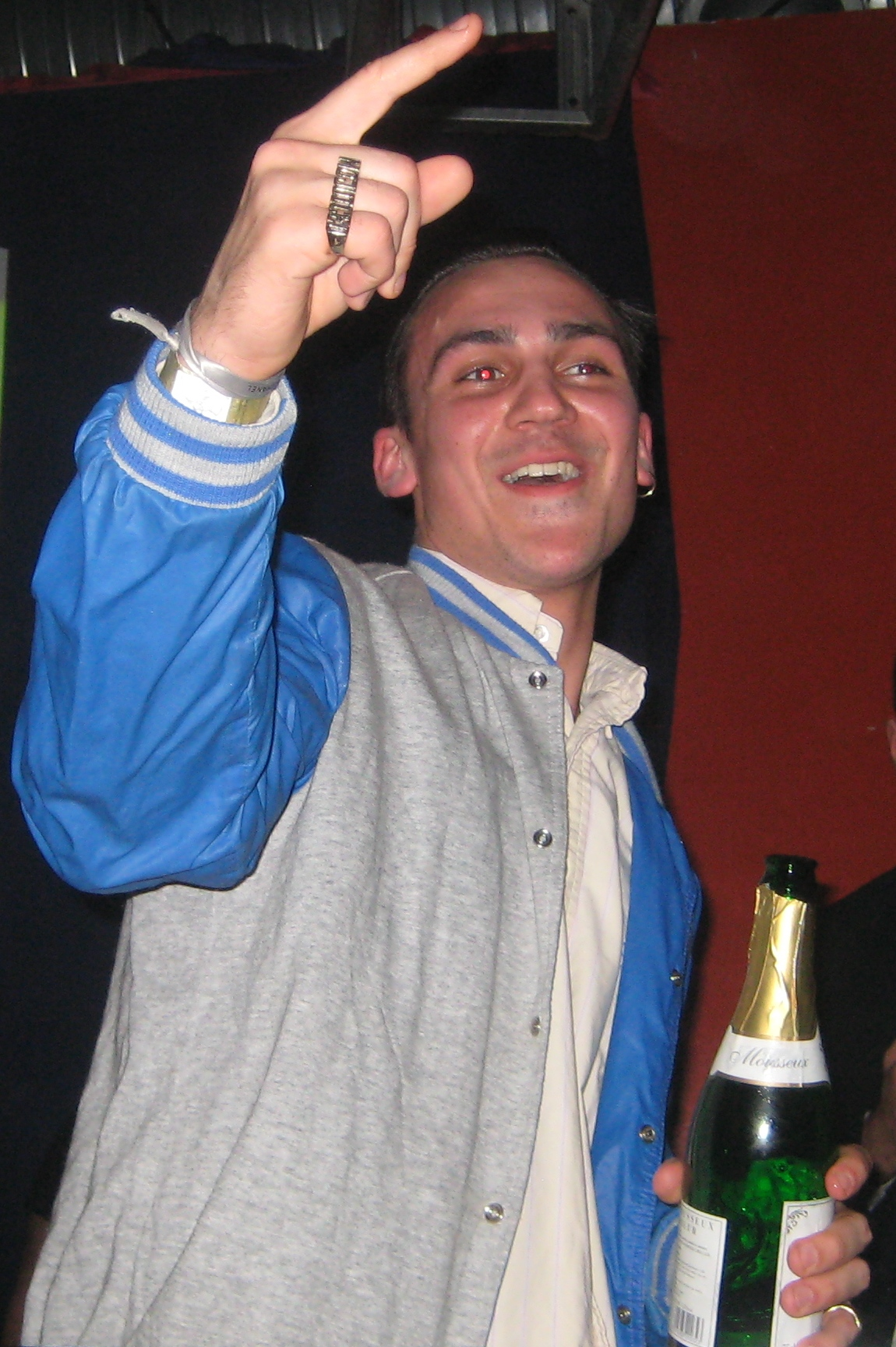
Henry Lloyd-Hughes plays Mark

Mark Donovan is the foul-mouthed school bully, who often targets Will. This is partly because he catches Will kissing his ex-girlfriend Charlotte Hinchcliffe. He is the typical bully, who is friendly and patient in front of parents or teachers but is otherwise a thuggish hoodlum. Donovan is somewhat sensitive, demanding that Will be "gentle" with Charlotte, while threatening him with death if he speaks of it. He appears to be less hostile (yet by no means friendlier) towards Jay, Simon and Neil, and dubs the boys as a collective: "Team Twat". In "The Gig and the Girlfriend", it is revealed that Donovan smokes cannabis. Jay and Neil attempt to buy some off him upon learning of this, only for him to take the money and sarcastically give them tea granules wrapped in cling film. He is mentioned in "Will's Dilemma" as attacking Neil in detention, pinning him down to draw penises on the cast that he was wearing.

Donovan reappears in the film, after Mr Gilbert's speech, where he says "goodbye" to the boys, whom he calls the "bender squad". He then proceeds to give Will an extremely painful wedgie, until Carli tells him to stop. In the deleted scenes, the wedgie is performed so strongly that the underwear used for the wedgie is torn off Will. He was meant to follow the boys to Greece, but the producers could not fit this into the story, so Donovan's role was significantly cut down.

=== Tara Brown ===
- Played by Hannah Tointon
- 2010

Tara Brown is in the year below the four main characters and becomes a love interest for Simon when he accidentally sits on her in the common room, after which they talk about music; Tara then invites Simon to a gig. A bubbly, hyper and impulsive girl, she becomes Simon's girlfriend in the episode "The Gig and the Girlfriend". Simon promises to bring cannabis to the gig, after Jay (falsely) claims that his friend could get them some. They eventually do find some cannabis and all get high. In the same episode, Tara gets injured while moshing and, from a combination of being stoned and concussed, feels queasy and faint, and is violently sick just before kissing Simon. Will goes to Simon for help when he has an adverse reaction to the drugs, but the latter is too busy with Tara, as she is stoned, throwing up, has wet herself and is passionately kissing Simon. Tara has a mostly ambivalent attitude towards Will, Jay and Neil, but does try to set Will up with her close friend Kerry in "Will's Dilemma" via a double date at Waterside shopping centre. Her final appearance is in the episode "The Trip to Warwick", in which Simon and Tara plan to go to her sister's house in Warwick to have sex. Simon, to Tara's annoyance, brings along the other boys. When they do attempt to have sex, Simon scares Tara, as he cannot get an erection (after following some unhelpful advice from Jay to increase his stamina by having a "tactical wank" beforehand) and attempts to induce one by hitting and verbally insulting his penis. He and the other boys are then kicked out of Tara's sister's house in the middle of the night; Simon receives a text from her in the morning, telling him never to contact her again.

When her name is mentioned, Jay often mimics the sound of morse code and exclaims "time for another Tara update!", because Simon talks about her so frequently during their short relationship. He manages to keep this up even when vomiting owing to a hangover on the car journey back from Warwick.

=== John Webster ===
- Played by John Seaward
- 2008–2011

John Webster, frequently referred to as Big John, is a slow-witted student who joins the school at the same time as Will. He is bullied for being obese and often seen eating. His most prominent appearance is in "Xmas Party", where he has a deep conversation with Jay, although the latter throws this away when attracted by Samantha. In "Will's Birthday", despite his general unpopularity, he is invited to a party while the four boys are not, and is seen successfully flirting with a girl at said party, with his hand on her breast. He is later seen sporadically throughout the series. In the first film, while Mr Gilbert is giving his vicious year-end speech, John is briefly seen sniffing his underarms when Mr Gilbert mentions that he "actively dislikes" some students for their "poor personal hygiene".

=== Mr Gilbert ===
- Played by Greg Davies
- 2008–2014

Phil Gilbert is the school's head of sixth form. He is sardonic, sadistic, misanthropic, dry, and possesses minimal enthusiasm for his occupation, once telling Will that teaching is merely a "graveyard for the unlucky and unambitious" and that a "more relaxed view on police checks" is the sole reason anybody is in the profession. At any other given time, he shows indifference towards his students and their welfare. On the occasions he does stop wrongdoing, he defuses the situation without actually resolving it; for example threatening Will if he 'grasses' on Mark Donovan for tying him up and putting a bin over his head. He also enjoys handing out detention for the most trivial of reasons, giving Jay and Neil four weeks of it after they mention Waterside, the shopping centre they spotted him buying soft toys in.

Gilbert shows a particular dislike for Will, who often tries to endear himself to Gilbert, but is always rebuffed. He takes delight at any misfortune to befall Will – perhaps most notably laughing raucously on hearing the news of Will being thrown into a lake by his work experience colleagues. He also blackmails Will into discovering who destroyed a local roundabout's flower arrangement by threatening to sabotage his university application, as he believes Will sticks his "beaky nose" into everybody's business and must know who did it. In the third series, he tells Will that he is single (despite allegedly dating Miss Timms in the episode 'Xmas Party') and that Will's mother Polly is "very much [his] type".

In the first film, Gilbert gives an end-of-year speech, in which he expresses complete contempt for the entire year group, claiming he is "at best ambivalent" towards most of the students, but that he "actively dislikes" others for their "poor personal hygiene" (looking at Big John) and "irritating personalities" (while looking at Will, who assumes he must be talking to somebody behind him). He ends the hate-filled speech by requesting that they not murder anyone, as it "reflects badly" on the school. In the final scene, Gilbert is seen riding shirtless on a quad bike in Malia, the same holiday destination as the boys.

=== Carli D'Amato ===
- Played by Emily Head
- 2008–2011

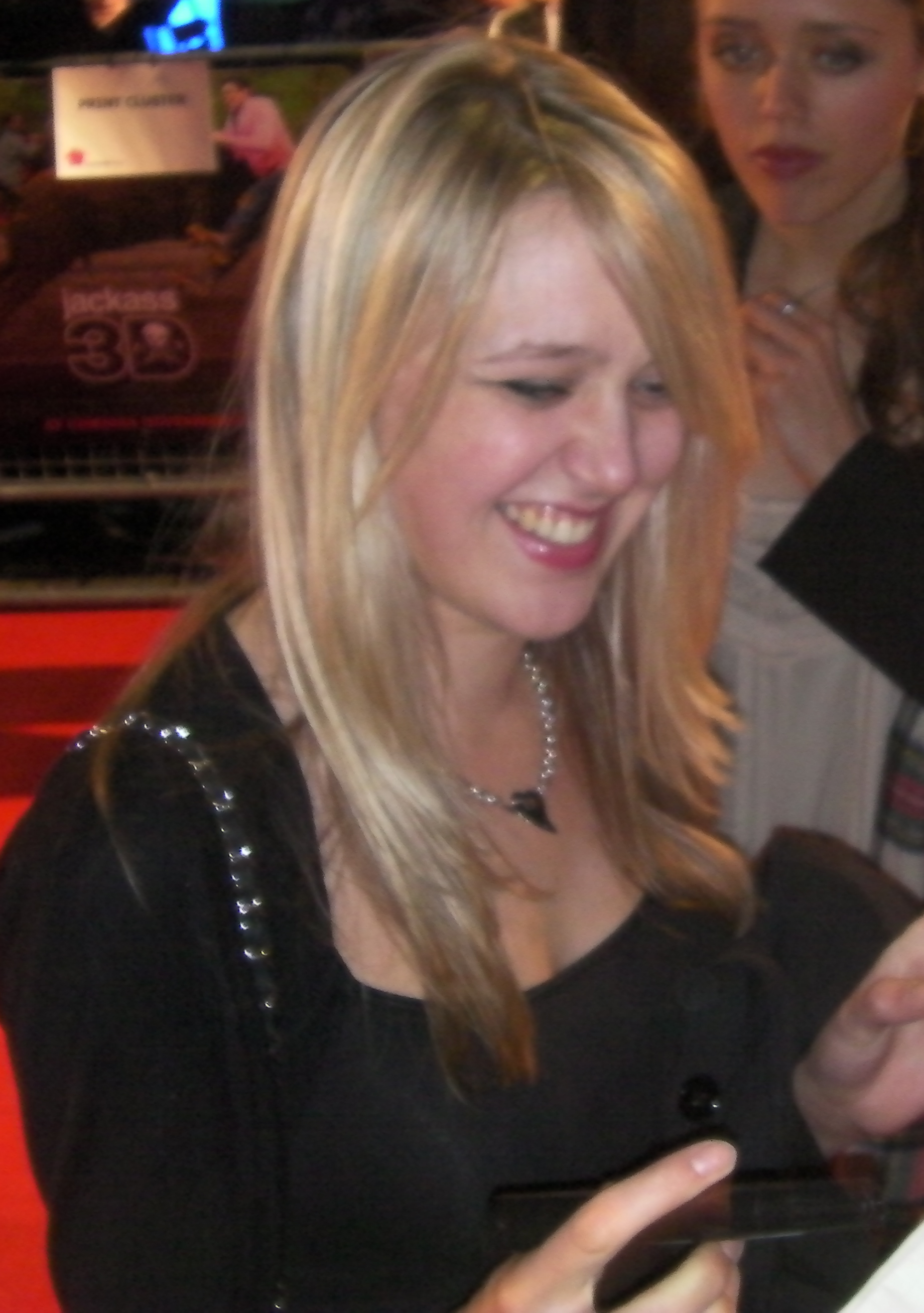
Emily Head plays Carli

Carli D'Amato is Simon's love interest and has been since they were eight years old. She is popular and attractive, and dates an older rugby player named Tom, making her even more unattainable. Although she is well aware of his strong attraction to her, she seems to think of Simon as only a platonic friend and is usually put off by his behaviour, although she is not above stringing him along to gain his favour. Simon is oblivious to Carli's selfish and manipulative personality, though his friends are not as easily fooled. On several occasions, Will and Jay express dislike for her, Will pointing out that she merely strings Simon along, while Jay labels her a "stuck-up cock-tease".In keeping with her manipulative personality, she throws Simon small bits of affection to keep his hopes alive. An example of this occurs in the episode "Exam Time", in which she asks if she can revise for her exams at Simon's house, and when there, mentions that she has broken up with her boyfriend. Noticing Simon trying to impress her, she uses the opportunity to make him tutor her for a subject that he is not even studying himself. He then spends the entire revision period studying for her geography exam, so he can continue to tutor her, instead of his own exams. At the end of Simon's "tutoring", they share a kiss. When he subsequently thinks they have a chance at a solid relationship, she informs him she is back with Tom.

In "The Fashion Show", a wedge is driven between Carli and Simon after he accidentally displays one of his testicles on the runway, believing he did it on purpose to embarrass her. However, in the series finale "The Camping Trip", it is implied that Carli is genuinely affectionate toward Simon after an explicit prank text sent by Jay; Simon refuses to reveal the nature of her response, but is pleased upon reading it.

Between the end of the series and the beginning of the first film, Simon and Carli have been dating, but she abruptly breaks up with him as she wants to be single while going on holiday and at university. The boys' attempts to get him over Carli are the catalyst for going on holiday to Malia, although they find once there that Neil (having asked Carli himself) had booked them onto the same holiday as her, which Simon views as a sign he should win her back. He rebuffs the advances of a nice girl named Lucy in his attempts to do so, but Carli has since formed a relationship with James, her narcissistic holiday rep. At a boat party, she and James fall out and Carli asks Simon to kiss her to make James feel jealous. Simon finally realises that Carli is using him for her own gain and breaks up with her for good.

=== John Kennedy ===
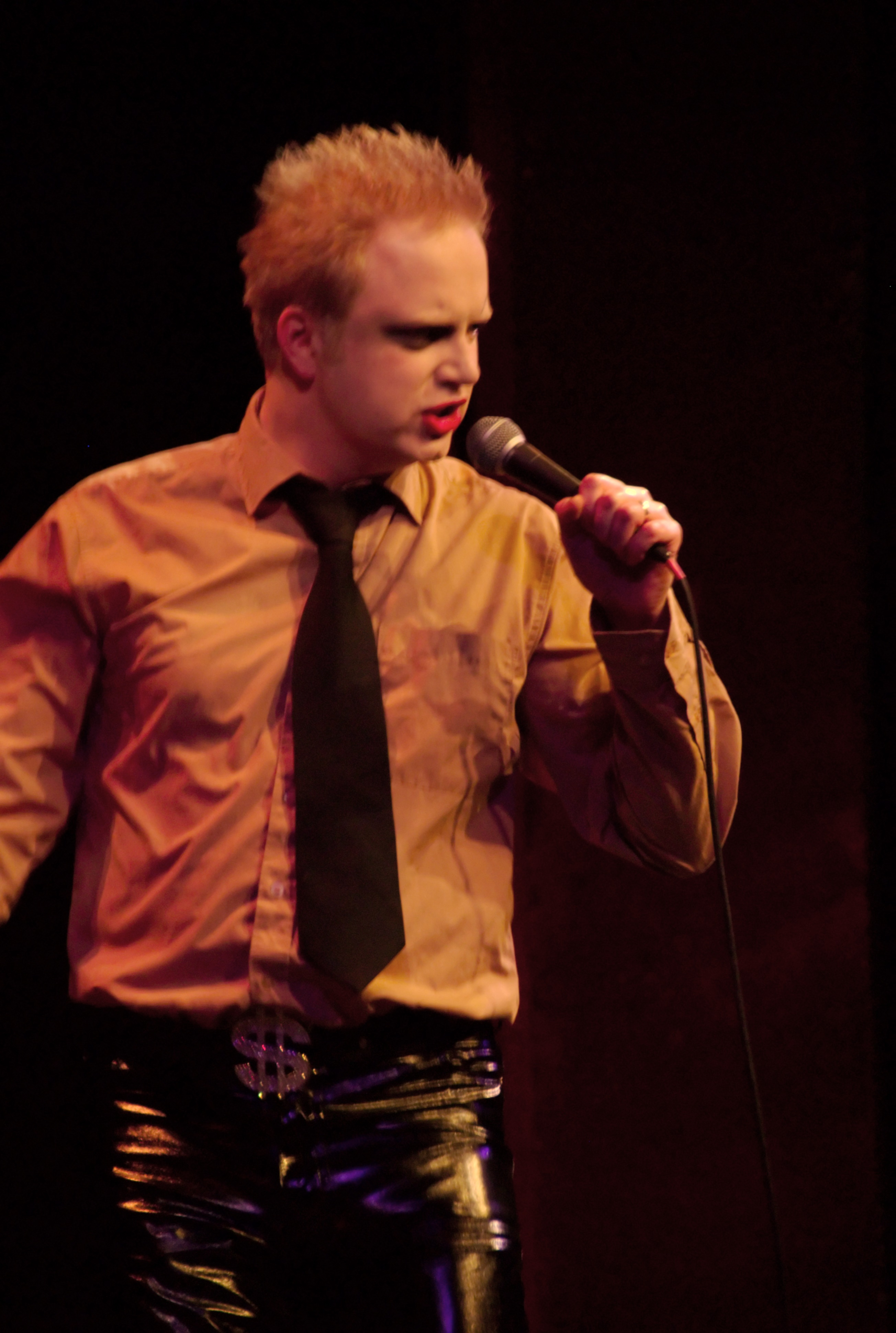
Waen Shepherd plays Mr Kennedy

- Played by Waen Shepherd
- 2009–2010

John Kennedy, referred to by the boys as Paedo Kennedy, is a geography teacher at Rudge Park Comprehensive. A rumour frequently circulates of him being a paedophile (according to Simon, he was once caught masturbating to the school orchestra in the music cupboard), and he shows a particular attraction toward Neil. In "The Field Trip", he goes as far to buy Neil a pair of trunks and take him swimming, and buys him a bottle of vodka as an incentive for him to get drunk, before sneaking into the boys' dormitory in the middle of the night and inappropriately massaging Neil's leg. Neil, however, seems oblivious to the illegality of Kennedy's actions until he reappears in "The Fashion Show" and drunkenly attempts to undress Neil. Mr Gilbert makes it clear that he is aware of Kennedy's tendencies, stating that he has "put [his] fucking neck on the line" for him. He is still, however, employed by the school, much to the incredulity of the boys.

=== Charlotte Hinchcliffe ===
- Played by Emily Atack
- 2008–2010

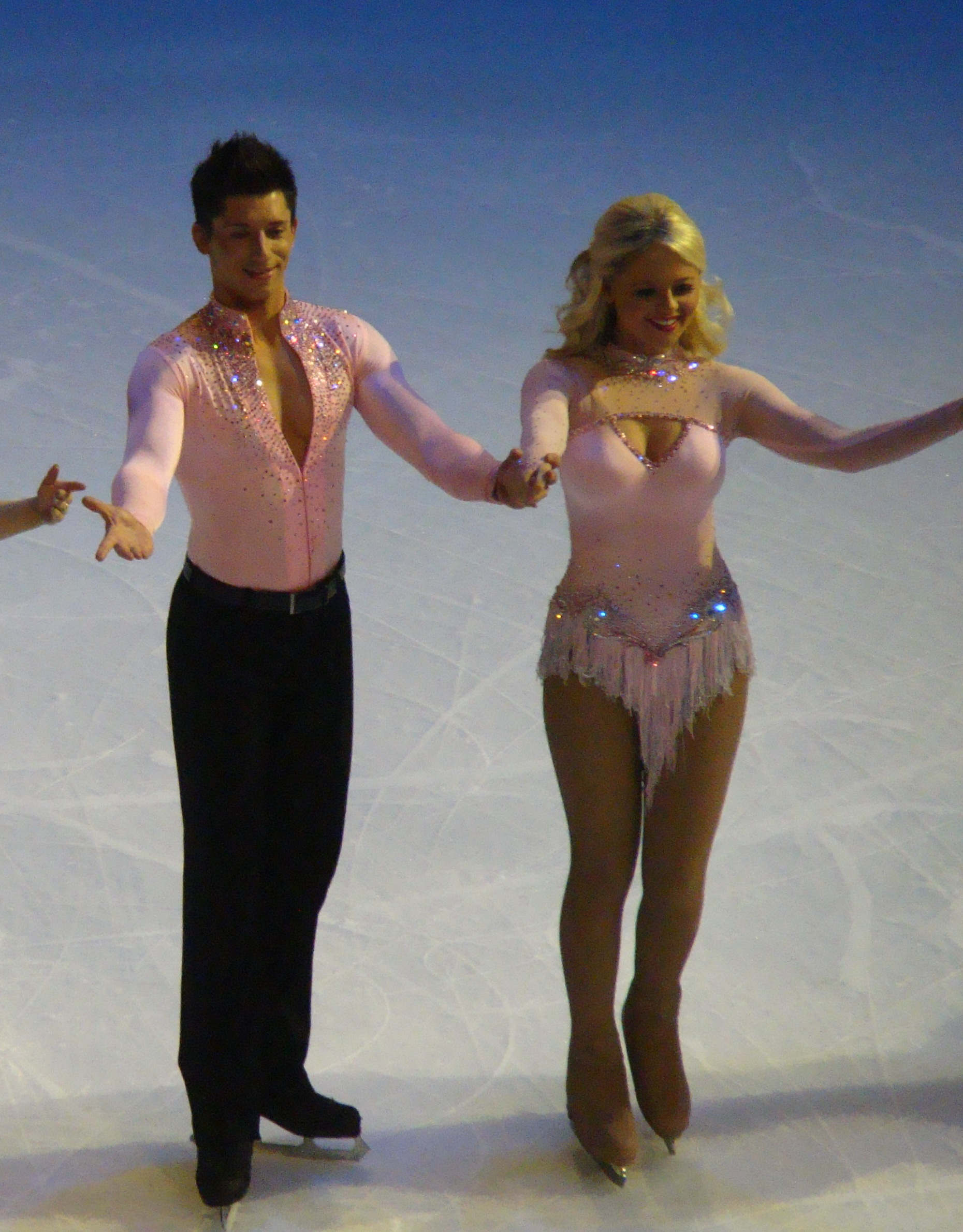
Emily Atack (right) plays Charlotte

Charlotte Hinchcliffe is the most attractive and popular girl in the school and serves as Will's love interest throughout the series. She is very self-assured and has a reputation for being promiscuous, mentioning to Will that she has had "eleven lovers already". Despite her reputation and nickname, and the behaviour of many popular girls in the school (most notably Carli), Charlotte is a sweet, genuine and compassionate girl. She becomes romantically involved with Will in "Will Gets A Girlfriend", bonding with and kissing him at a party. She dates Will for a short while, but the relationship takes a bad turn after they fail to have sex properly, Will having falsely claimed to sleep with numerous girls before her. Unlike many popular students, Charlotte genuinely likes Will, despite his tendency to parade his interactions with her and his attempts to intercept her relationships with other male students; often making a fool of himself in front of her and occasionally offending her in the process. Nevertheless, she maintains a fondness for him, kissing him again in "Xmas Party".

Charlotte and Will's relationship becomes troubled in series 2. In "Work Experience", Will tactlessly exaggerates his relationship with her to the men at the garage where he works, leaving Charlotte furious. Subsequently in "Will's Birthday", she has sex with Patrice (Simon's French exchange student) with Will walking in on the two of them doing so. Charlotte is away at university in series 3 and makes a final appearance in "The Fashion Show" during a reading week; Will again attempts to win her over by abandoning his protest against the show. Despite showing considerable affection toward him, Charlotte ends any chance of a relationship by telling him she desires "someone like him" instead of Will himself.

== Minor and one-off characters ==
=== David Glover ===
- Played by Richie Hart
- 2008–2010

David Glover is a student at the school who appears in several episodes but says very little. He is popular and looks down on the four boys, referring to Will as a "posh little prick" and calling Neil a "twat". He ignores Will on his first day when he attempts to make friends with him. David is often seen in the background playing his Nintendo DS and pool at school in the common room. On the school trip to Swanage, he is seen answering the door at the party and conferring with Mark Donovan as to whether to let the boys in. However, in "Xmas Party", Glover ends up defending Will from Donovan's harm, even while still referring to him as a "specky short-arse". In "Exam Time", Neil mentioned that he thinks that Jay's new girlfriend Chloe "got off" with Glover. In The Inbetweeners Yearbook, he is briefly mentioned by Neil in the map of Rudge Park; Neil says that he and Jay had a fight outside of school and that the video was uploaded to YouTube but taken down shortly afterwards for being too violent. This is highly doubtful, however, and is probably a lie told by Jay to Neil.

=== David Philips ===
- Played by Greg Coker
- 2008–2010

David Philips is a new student who arrives at the school at the same time as Will. He is seen as one of the school "freaks" and becomes friends with John Webster. David appears infrequently throughout the series, helping organise the Christmas prom and attending Neil's 18th birthday party. His only lines are in the deleted scenes of series 1, where he and Susie introduce themselves to each other, and there is another deleted scene where he is forced to seemingly eat his "new kid" badge by Mark Donovan. In "The Field Trip", he is glimpsed on more than one occasion.

=== "Football Friend" ===
- Played by Luke Norris
- 2008

A friend of Jay who he claims to have met during trials for West Ham United ("that never happened", according to Simon). Will, Simon and Neil continuously mock Jay for having a friend outside of their group by saying "Friend!", "Football Friend!" or "Car Friend!" in a high-pitched voice, and giving him a thumbs-up gesture. This irritates Jay to the extent that, upon seeing Football Friend's car at the side of the road one day, jumps up and down on the bonnet violently, yelling "fucking football friend" until he arrives on the scene and chases them off. Jay says later that he had to borrow £300 to have the car repaired and stop the friend calling the police.

=== Becky ===
- Played by Clemency Hallian
- 2008

Becky is, like Jay, a regular visitor to the caravan club in Camber Sands. When the boys head on a weekend to the caravan club, Jay promises the group that they will meet her and that she is largely promiscuous. She texts Simon, after sorting it out with Jay prior to the group's arrival, a picture of herself, which makes Simon think that she likes him and wants to have sex with him. At the caravan club disco, Simon wrongly believes that she does want sex with him after she dances with him and they share a kiss, and he undresses himself in front of her, which scares her off and causes Simon to lose his temper with Jay because he lied to him. Jay then says that he has not had sex with her or her sister despite his previous claim; just with "other, similar" girls at the caravan club.

=== "Punk Girl" ===
- Played by Suzi Battersby
- 2008

The Punk Girl is around the same age as the boys and has red hair and a goth type personality. She is seen on her own at the caravan club disco. Upon meeting Will, she asks him to go outside to have sex with her (this being after they have already kissed), but Will, who wants to delay it, suggests they should get to know each other a bit more first. In a bid to postpone sex with her, he begins to childishly slide along the wooden floor on his socks. Ultimately, this puts her off him completely. Later on at the disco, she is impressed by Neil's dance moves and it is discovered on the drive home that Neil fingered her in the night and she gave him handjobs, having slept in Simon's car.

=== Lauren Harris ===
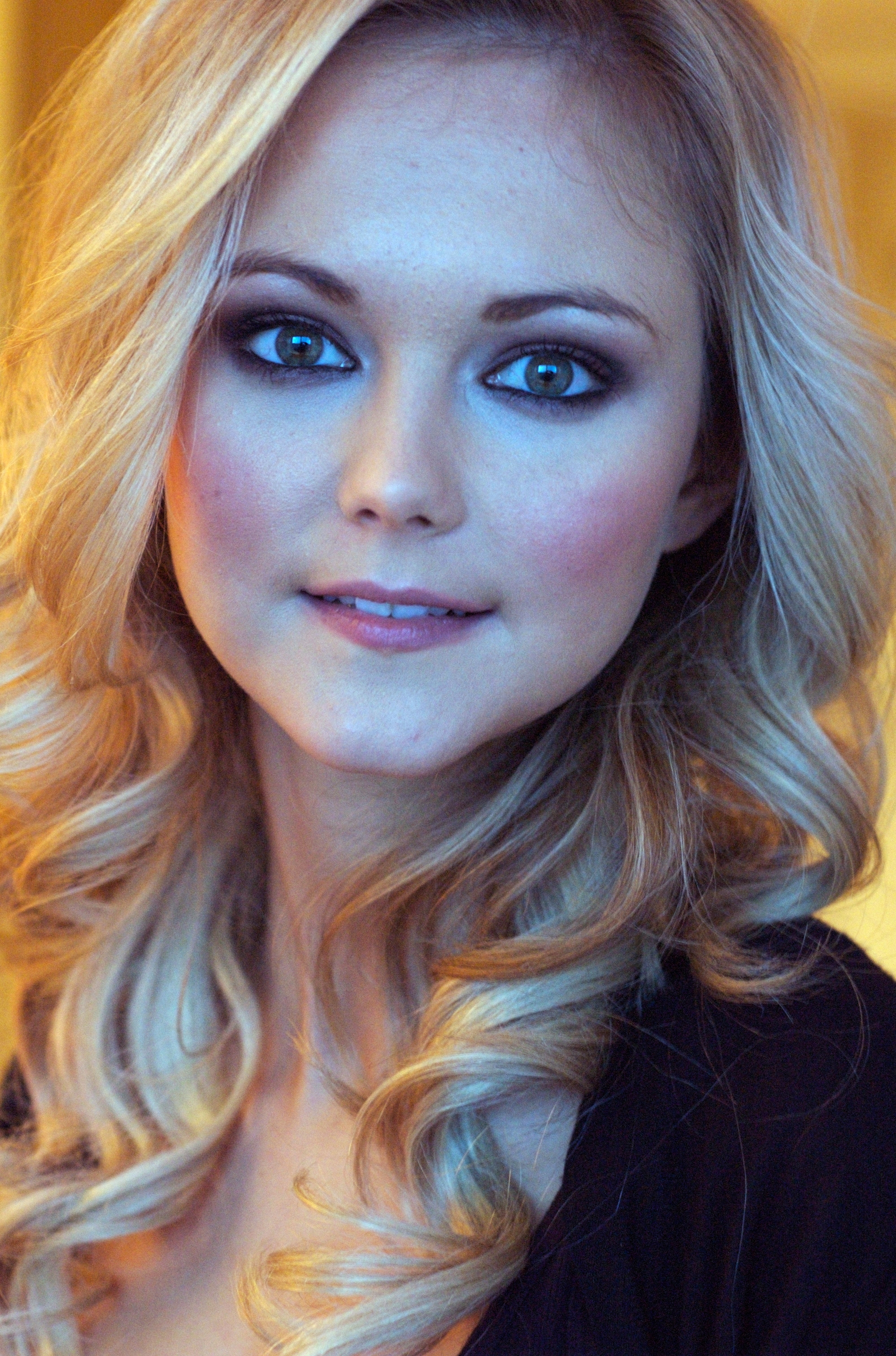
Jayne Wisener plays Lauren

- Played by Jayne Wisener
- 2009

Lauren Harris is a Northern Irish girl who joins the school in "The Field Trip". Will sits next to her on the coach to Swanage, where he confuses her "for about an hour" with his impression of the Star Wars character, Yoda, which she assumes is a social impairment. She hangs out with the group for the duration of the trip, with both Will and Simon attracted to her. To Will's frustration, she quickly becomes attracted to Simon and has no interest in him, leading Will to the extent of sabotaging Simon's date with her. Having become stranded in the harbour and called the coastguard, Will angrily swears at her when she distracts him. After the trip to Swanage, Will states in the closing narration that Lauren has moved again (despite only just joining the school); she is never seen again by the boys.

=== Susie ===
- Played by Anabel Barnston
- 2008

Susie is a geeky girl who joins the school alongside Will. She is taking her A-Levels four years early, implying her to be about twelve or thirteen. She has an interest in Russian literature, and Neil, to her delight and his dismay, picked her in the charity blind date, during which he has been feigning an interest in reading because "girls like clever blokes". Neil reluctantly takes Susie to Milwaukee Fried Chicken; however, owing to the age difference, her mother joins them. Will, Simon and Jay go to watch them under the impression that Neil and his date are sitting around a bargain bucket.

=== Samantha Leah ===
- Played by Jo Maycock
- 2008

Samantha is a female version of Jay from the episode "Xmas Party", stating that Jay's monologue on sensitivity and trust made him seem "bent" (a word-for-word copy of the statement Jay made to Simon earlier in the same episode) and telling an unbelievable lie that she "used to DJ at a top club in Ibiza" (highly unlikely for someone of school age) and that she could "probably" get him a regular spot there. Taken aback by this which seemed more like something that Jay himself would say, he invites her to spend part of the school prom in the DJ booth. He later claims that she gave him a blowjob; another outrageous lie that is quickly dismissed by the other boys and logically broken down to a handjob and then just to that he had ejaculated in his pants with questionable and unsubstantiated stimulus.

=== Daisy ===
- Played by Catherine Steadman
- 2009

Daisy used to be Will's babysitter. She is invited to Will's mother Polly's barbecue, and mentioned that she works at a local care home. Will, Simon and Neil begin working at the care home as volunteers on part of their Duke of Edinburgh award scheme. Will hits it off with Daisy, and after going on a date (which is actually just Daisy saying thank you to Will for covering her at work) they go back to her flat. Unfortunately, Will has no pubic hair because Neil and Jay had, as a prank, put hair removal cream in his underpants while he was asleep in the common room. Will decides to follow Simon's advice and "wear a wig down there", stealing the wig of a care home resident. When Daisy finds the wig, she is shocked. She harboured concern throughout their relationship that Will was too young for her, and seeing him without any pubic hair makes her feel very guilty and wants nothing more to do with him.

=== Miss Timms ===
- Played by Amanda St. John
- 2008

Miss Timms is a Biology teacher at Rudge Park Comprehensive. Neil, Jay and Simon find her very attractive, although Will, as an outsider, thinks that the idea of her extreme attractiveness is just a "subconscious comparison" to the other "older, unattractive" teachers at their school. While drunk at the school disco, Neil attempts to kiss her, but gets an erection and is then escorted outside by Mr Gilbert, to his embarrassment.

=== Chris D'Amato ===
- Played by Deo Simcox
- 2008, 2010

Chris D'Amato is Carli's younger brother. In the series one episode Bunk Off, Will upsets him by telling him about terrorists. Afterwards, Simon accidentally vomits on him. In the series three episode Camping Trip, a drunk Simon sneaks into his bedroom in the middle of the night and feels him up, believing it to be Carli's room. This causes Chris further distress.

=== Chloe ===
- Played by Lizzie Stables
- 2009

Chloe dates Jay in "Exam Time" after meeting him at a bus stop. In contrast to his usual crass sexual comments regarding girls, Jay appears to genuinely care about Chloe, as he becomes more sensitive and disregards Neil's sexual comments about her (which Neil had initially said only to gain Jay's approval, as such comments are more typical of Jay's character). At the end of the episode, Chloe ends the relationship with Jay after he takes his father Terry's poor advice, constantly texting and checking up on her, with her believing Jay to be too sensitive and clingy. Jay breaks down in front of Will, but in a false show of bravado claims he was the one who dumped her because she was "frigid" and "his cock was too big for her". Chloe is later mentioned in "Will's Dilemma" when Will makes a snide joke about how she made Jay cry, but Jay appears on the verge of tears when she is referenced, suggesting he has yet to get over the relationship ending.

=== Rachel ===
- Played by Lily Lovett
- 2009–2010

Rachel is Carli's best friend who is disdainful of Simon for his embarrassing obsession with her. She plays a main role in the episode "Night Out in London" where Will attempts to "pull" her in a London nightclub when he is amazed that she likes him enough to speak to him. However, she goes for another boy. Rachel is seen in numerous other episodes in the other series as well, mostly with Carli and often making disparaging remarks about Simon, although she does not feature prominently in any of them.

=== Tom ===
- Played by Ollie Holme
- 2008–2009

Tom is Carli's on and off boyfriend. A few years older than she is and thus not at the school, he is a rugby player who often neglects her for his teammates. They split up in "Exam Time", only to reconcile at the end of the episode, only to split up again in series three.

=== Patrice ===
- Played by Vladimir Consigny
- 2009

Patrice is a French exchange student, the son of Pamela Cooper's friend. He stays with Simon for a short time, displays little interest in the boys, and has bad habits that include chain-smoking and urinating in gardens. Patrice is a racist who spontaneously tells Will that he dislikes Arabs. He shows little regard for accepted social norms and openly tells Will that his mother Polly "has the sex" (is sexy) and later that he had just masturbated in the bathroom while thinking about her. Patrice is very attractive to women – even Simon and Will's mothers seem to fancy him. He is seen in bed with Charlotte at a party; Mark Donovan shows up and Will tells him that Charlotte is upstairs. The closing narration of the episode alludes to Patrice having been attacked by Donovan, much to Will's delight.

=== Danny Moore ===
- Played by Charlie Wernham
- 2009

Danny Moore appears in "Work Experience". He is a 12-year-old boy whose family are said to be involved in crime in Northwood. He starts a feud with Simon after he bumped into him while walking to class. Jay insults him for his angry reaction while his back is turned, with Danny incorrectly assuming Simon made the remark. When Simon is receiving a handjob from Hannah Fields at a disco, Danny knocks Simon to the floor before kicking him in the groin multiple times and threatening him with death. He then finds several older boys from Northwood who intend to beat the boys up. The boys hide from them in the toilets, until Polly arrives to pick them up, much to their embarrassment.

=== Jim ===
- Played by Cavan Clerkin
- 2009

Jim is the head mechanic at the garage Will is sent to for work experience in the second episode of series 2. An impudent Cockney, he attempts a fool's errand on Will on the first day (only for Will to catch on), and later, alongside the other mechanics, strips Will and throws him into a lake after inviting him out to a pub. He believes Will to be a virgin, and upon learning of Charlotte, expresses a desire to "check her out", because Will claimed that he has sex with her. At the under-18s disco, Jim speaks to Charlotte over Wolfie's mobile phone, telling her all of Will's outrageous allegations about their relationship.

=== Wolfie ===
- Played by David Fynn
- 2009

Wolfie is one of the assistant mechanics at the garage Will is sent to, alongside his boss Jim. He is seventeen years old (or at least claims to be) but appears much older owing to his deep voice and facial hair, with Will describing him as "looking about thirty". He goes to the under 18s' disco to "check out" Charlotte, with whom Will previously bragged about having sex, to see the two after they said he was unsuccessful sexually. There, he puts her on the phone with Jim, who informs her of all of Will's allegations about her "going like a porn star", leaving her furious; this leads her to throw a drink in his face and dismiss him.

=== Hannah Fields ===
- Played by Holly Peplow
- 2009

Hannah Fields appears in the series 2 episode "Work Experience". She is discussed when it is found that Simon has received a Valentine's card from her. She then appears later in the episode at the under 18s' disco where she gives Simon a handjob and passionately snogs him owing to being drunk – until he is attacked by Danny Moore.

=== Kerry ===
- Played by Abbey Mordue
- 2010

"Big" Kerry (also referred to as "Bigfoot", "Canary Wharf" and the "Empire State Building") is a friend of Tara whom Will begrudgingly dates in “Will’s Dilemma”. Although not attracted to her because of her height, he stays with her in the hope that, according to Simon, he may receive oral sex from her. Not wanting to use her, he tries to break up with her at Neil's party, but learns that her father had died recently (unbeknownst to Will), and accidentally offends her in trying to defend himself. Will is thrown out of Neil's house and banned from it by Neil's father Kevin, who reports the incident to Polly; as a result, Will is grounded for three weeks. Believing himself to have ruined Neil’s birthday party, Will's is disappointed and shocked when Neil reveals that Kerry had given him two blowjobs after the guests had left.

=== Alastair Scott ===
- Played by Steven Webb
- 2010

Alastair is a wheelchair-using student who had a kidney transplant after suffering kidney failure. Rudge Park Comprehensive organises a fashion show in support of his charity. Despite being popular on his return, Alastair is arrogant, short-tempered, immature and unpleasant. He throws tantrums when upset by Will, who tries to usurp the fashion show because he believes it is a "vanity fest" instead of a suitable charitable event, at one point becoming hysterical and trying to ram Will's legs with his chair.

=== The Tramp ===
- Played by Robert McCafferty
- 2009

A Scottish tramp who is seen in an alleyway beside the nightclub the boys go to in London. He is first heard shouting "hammerhead shark". When Simon is unable to enter because of his trainers, he reluctantly trades shoes with him to get in, only to find that they are soaked with urine. Carli notices this and leaves Simon, disgusted. Simon happens upon him after leaving the club, only to discover that his new trainers are also now saturated with urine and faecal matter.

=== Angry Neighbour/"The Fat Old Shit" ===
- Played by Mark Roper
- 2010

The man whose front garden is frequently vandalised by Jay and Neil. When Will eventually participates in the vandalism, the boys are caught. Angry at his daffodils being destroyed by the four boys, he arrives angrily at Will's house the next day to try and confront them, but instead he informs Will's mother; who has just arrived home from her weekend break to the Cotswolds.

=== Steve (pub patron) ===
- Played by Tim Faraday
- 2008

A patron of The Black Bull – the pub which the boys mistakenly go to in "First Day". He is asked by Will to buy drinks for the boys to circumvent alcohol sales laws. In return, Will offers to pay for all of his drinks, to which he orders "as many as four" double rum and cokes.

=== Steve/"Mr Chippy" ===
- 2008

A carpenter who accompanies Kevin as he interrupts the boys' party in "Bunk Off". He is referred to by Kevin as Steve and by Will as "Mr Chippy" – a reference to his occupation.

=== The Drug Dealer ===
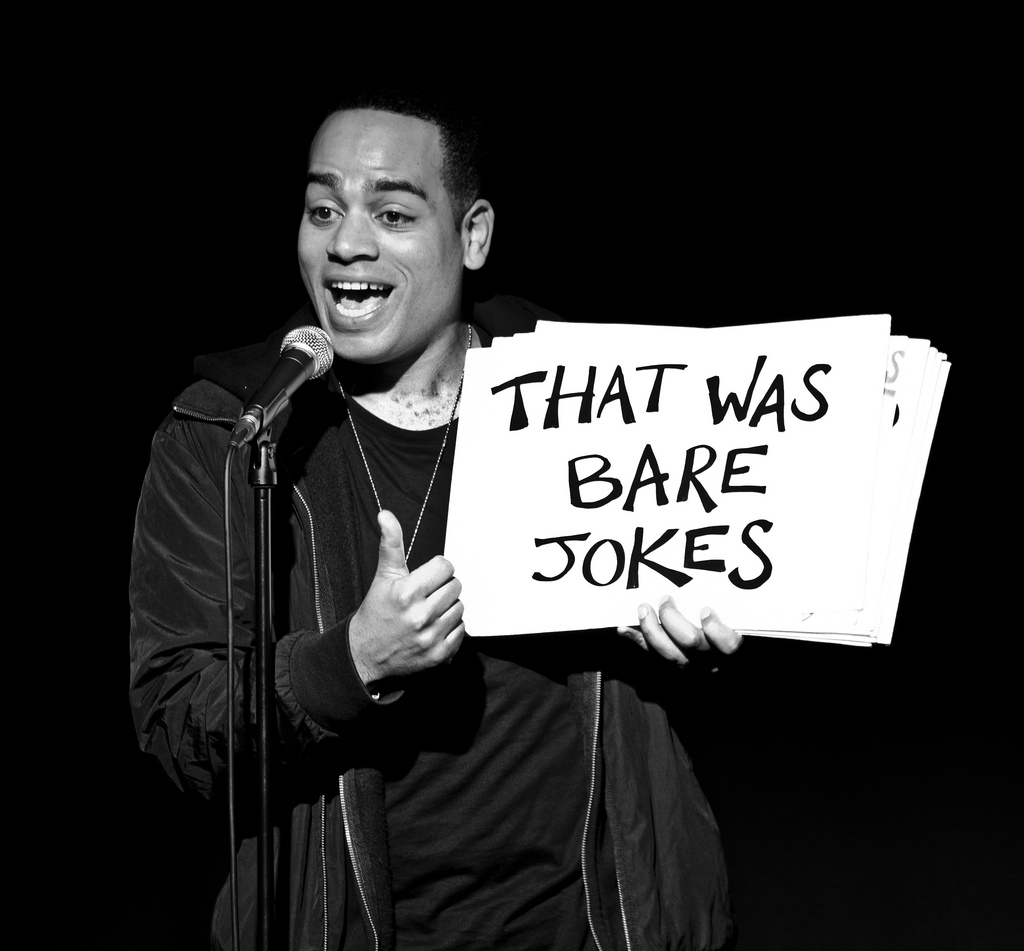
Doc Brown plays Steve

- Played by Doc Brown
- 2010

A drug dealer who appears in the series 3 episode "The Gig and the Girlfriend". When the group are looking for drugs at the gig, Jay and Neil see Steve giving a man something discreetly that they assume is drugs, but when they go over to ask for him for some, he assumes that they think he is a drug dealer because he is black. Regardless, he lets the boys buy drugs from him and even rolls it up, following Jay's plea.

Although he is not referred to by name in the episode itself, he is credited as Steve.

=== Mrs D'Amato ===
- Played by an unnamed extra
- 2008

Mrs D'Amato is Carli's mother. A stylish, attractive and youthful blonde, she appears in only the series one episode "Bunk Off", when the boys are waiting outside the off licence for Will. She happens to be passing by on the other side of the street and Jay embarrasses Simon by shouting at her that Simon "wants to suck on your Carli's tits". Mrs D'Amato does not say anything but gives the boys an annoyed look. The only other times she is mentioned are in "First Day" when Carli asks Simon not to mention the night out at the pub to his folks, as he knows what her mum is like, and in "Exam Time" when Carli tells Simon that her mum was always listening in when Carli split up with Tom (which is the cause of how Simon discovers they have split up).

=== Sophie Brown ===
- Played by Charlie Covell
- 2010

Sophie is Tara's older sister, who is studying at the University of Warwick. She is suspicious of and hostile to the four boys, especially Simon. During the boys' visit to Sophie's student accommodation, Will eats one of her bonsai plants for a dare, Jay walks into her room at night while drunk and attempts to seduce Sophie and her flatmate Heike, Neil urinates while sleeping in his and Will's bed, and Simon emerges naked into the corridor to show Tara that he has at last managed to achieve an erection. She throws the boys out, despite Will's attempts to persuade her to let them stay, after threatening to call the police if they do not leave.

=== Heike ===
- Played by Ambrosine Falck
- 2010

Heike is Sophie's Dutch flatmate. Sophie has to share her bed so that Simon and Tara can have sex in Sophie's bed. In "Trip To Warwick" she is first seen when she walks into the room and meets Jay (who has just told the boys that Dutch women are "always the filthiest", that when he was twelve one "shit down his arm" when he "fingered her" and told Neil that "European birds" are "filthy", "hairy" and "don't mind if you wipe it on the curtains") and Neil and has a very bad cold. She is seen later in bed with Sophie when Jay asks her for sex, but Sophie kicks him out, although not before he offers to have a "three-way" with Sophie as well.

=== The University Boys: The Bombardier, The Commander and The Admiral ===
- Played by Lewis Linford, Jack Brear and Daniel Kirrane
- 2010

Lewis, Joe and Daniel are three obnoxious students who frequently play loud drinking games in Sophie's living room. The three are typical university students and as such their drunken behaviour disturbs Will, who previously assumed that his evenings at university would involve intellectual debate. They immediately nickname Will "Speccy" and later engage him in a game of "Question", demanding that he, Jay and Neil down a can of beer for asking a question.

In a deleted scene, the boys later convince Jay that Sophie's Dutch housemate, Heike, is sexually adventurous and is attracted to younger boys.

=== Fergus ===
- Played by Scott Biggerstaff
- 2010

Fergus is a friend of Will's mother, with whom she goes on holiday to the Cotswolds in “Home Alone”. According to Polly, he is a friend from college who she caught up with on Facebook. Will becomes suspicious that there is a romance between them; this and discovering his mother is on Facebook is the basis for much interest from Jay and Neil, who repeatedly joke about it.

Fergus himself is seen only briefly, waiting in his car to leave with Polly. Will immediately shows a dislike towards him, describing him as a “massive ginger bellend with a stupid car” and is dismayed at his mother for being so naïve to go on a date with someone she hardly knows, asking "where's he taking you? A ditch off the A40?".

He is mentioned again in the episode’s closing narration, Will stating that his mum was dumped immediately because Fergus could not put up with a "problem child".

=== Mrs Springett ===
- Played by an unknown actor
- 2010

Mrs Springett is an elderly woman, presumed to be a close neighbour. Appearing once in "Home Alone", Polly asks her to pop by to check on Will while he is at home alone for the weekend. She makes her extremely brief appearance later on in the episode, the next morning when she "hears banging" (not knowing it was coming from the angry neighbour) and tries the house. Will panics and quickly kicks the door shut on her, knocking her down. When Will's mum returns home, Mrs Springett is shown to have suffered a broken nose after being hit by the door.

=== Tracey ===
- Played by Oriane Messina
- 2008

Tracey is the examiner during Simon's driving test. She makes several blunt attempts at flirting with Simon and places her hand on his upper thigh. It is implied that she ensures Simon passes the test in exchange for him allowing her to feel him up.

=== Mr Sethi ===
- Played by Ash Varrez
- 2008

Mr Sethi is a tailor who owns the shop from which the boys hire their suits in "Xmas Party". He has a habit of asking "too jazzy?" if the customer is unsure about their suit. The recommendation came from Simon's dad, who has rented many suits from Sethi over the years. One particular incident involved Simon's dad leaving "grass stains" on the rental suit when engaging in sexual activity with Simon's mum, leaving Sethi unimpressed, with Simon's dad claiming Sethi "went mental".

== Family ==
=== Polly McKenzie ===
- Played by Belinda Stewart-Wilson
- 2008–2014

Polly is Will's young attractive mother, whom several of his classmates have stated their attraction to. Because of her separation from his father, she cannot afford to continue sending Will to a private school. This sets up the pilot episode, but she attributes their house and school move to him having been bullied. Will is often teased about his mother's attractiveness, although Polly is often oblivious to their desires, such as assuming in the series 3 episode "Home Alone" that the boys are giving genuine gaming advice when they tell her to "bounce around" to improve her performance in a video game.

Polly often overshares details or stories about Will, who is seen to be embarrassed by his mother, like in "Home Alone" she asks Neil to insert a suppository to cure Will's migraines, when she told Simon and Mark Donovan in "Thorpe Park" about the time he cried on the ghost train, when, aged seven and drunk on shandy, he "pulled down his pants" and ran around yelling "I've got a white slug". She also often gives well-intentioned advice or praise to Will, but phrases it horribly and makes him feel self-conscious, like when she tells Will not to pursue Charlotte Hinchcliffe, the most popular girl in school, by telling him that someone like him should "go for one of the plainer girls. Let the good-looking boys go out with the good-looking girls" or when she tells him she can trust that he will not take drugs because he is boring. Because of Will's sarcastic replies, she usually looks pleased with herself afterwards. However, Will seems to have quite a childlike attachment to his mother, whom he cries to when he is upset and gets her to report his bullying to Mr Gilbert.

Polly's job is never specified, although in the "Caravan Club" episode the boys find nude photographs in a pornographic magazine of a woman who is at least the spitting image of her, to Will's utter dismay. Polly attempts to begin a relationship with a former schoolfriend named Fergus, the first since her separation, but it is ruined by Will's dramatic reaction and consequently getting drunk and vandalising a garden; Fergus breaks up with Polly because he cannot deal with a "problem child".

In the second film, Polly begins a relationship with Will's former head of sixth form, Mr Gilbert. Originally, when she is seen on Skype, Will becomes suspicious on seeing that she has laid two bowls for breakfast, although she pretends that Will's grandma is staying. Then, at the end of the film, Polly announces to Will that she and Mr Gilbert have entered into a relationship and are engaged, to Will's horror as Mr Gilbert is to become his new stepfather.

=== Pamela Cooper ===
- Played by Robin Weaver
- 2008–2014

Pamela is Simon's mother. She is caring and supportive of him, but her efforts to help are often met by embarrassment and surliness from Simon, who can find her overbearing. The details of her sex life are often shared with the boys by Mr Cooper, which makes Simon feel awkward. When Simon is being unreasonable, she attempts to reason with him and make the best of things, which usually serves to make him more ill-tempered.

In "Duke of Edinburgh", Mr and Mrs Cooper separate temporarily, which upsets her greatly; when Simon hears about her crying, he describes it as "blubbering" which embarrasses and annoys him. However, Mr and Mrs Cooper reconcile by the end of the episode, and according to Will's narration, have noisy sex upstairs while the boys are in the front room.

=== Alan Cooper ===
- Played by Martin Trenaman
- 2008–2014

Alan is Simon's father. He constantly reminds Simon (and the other boys) of his sex life, often going into unwelcome, inappropriate, intimate detail of his sexual life both with and before his marriage to Pamela. While dropping the boys off at the airport he tells the boys that they are in for a great time stating "girls just seem to let themselves go a bit more abroad ... you're Mum's the same even now". Despite his sexual nature, Alan is an ultimately caring parent and reasonable disciplinarian, but Simon claims he has a tendency to "go mental" when Simon does something irresponsible or lets him down, such as going out to London at night and not attending the father/son golf tournament.

=== Andrew Cooper ===
- Played by Dominic Applewhite
- 2008–2010

Andrew is Simon's younger brother, with whom he often argues. He has been seen to outsmart Simon on more than one occasion, and it seems that he has a bit of disdain for Simon's uncool "sad case" status, suggesting he is more popular and more liked at school than Simon.

In "The Camping Trip", when Mr Cooper announces that, after a hard decision, he is moving the family to Swansea, Simon reacts badly and says he will stay in London and get a flat with Jay, offering Andrew the chance to live there too; Andrew flatly refuses to even consider it, implying that he would rather move to Wales than live with Simon and Jay.

=== Mrs Cartwright ===
- Played by Victoria Willing
- 2008–2011

Mrs Cartwright is Jay's mother. She is amicable and easy-going, providing food for the boys in "Caravan Club" and making conversation. In situations where she and Mr Cartwright are together, she often takes a secondary role owing to his vulgar and forthright manner. Because of Jay's constant masturbation, she has unwittingly interrupted Jay on several occasions, much to his embarrassment.

=== Terry Cartwright ===
- Played by David Schaal
- 2008–2014

Terry is Jay's overweight and verbally abusive father. He has poor lavatory hygiene and frequently ridicules Jay's lack of success with women. Despite this, he seems to get along well with Will, Simon and Neil, for instance encouraging Will to stand up for himself against some children who had stolen his shoes. Such support is not found in his conversations with Jay, which are either humiliating (for instance: "with your brains, you'll be fucking lucky to get a job throwing shit into a skip") or poor advice expressed with little interest (for instance that Jay should message his new girlfriend incessantly and "check where she is the whole time"). He finds amusement in revealing to the other boys that Jay's stories about his alleged numerous sexual experiences are untrue. Despite Mr Cartwright's jokes at Jay's expense, Jay still exaggerates his father's life to impress his friends, claiming he "used to jack Ferraris for the Mafia" and played in a "private poker tournament with Danny Dyer and the Krays". In reality, Terry's life is less glamorous, running a building plant hire yard, spending holidays in caravans and watching horse racing, although (according to Jay at least) they have had a cleaner in the past. It is also surmised that Mr Cartwright's mistreatment of Jay is the reason for Jay's outrageous lies and behaviour, stemming from a deep-rooted need for approval from his father.

=== Kevin Sutherland ===
- Played by Alex Macqueen
- 2008–2014

Kevin is Neil's easy-going and mild-mannered father, who is often the subject of rumours of his alleged closet homosexuality. He vehemently denies this, despite the boys (bar Neil) and their parents assuming he is gay, with Will drunkenly calling him a "bumder" ("a cross between a 'bummer' and a 'bender'") to his face. Despite the frequent accusations, there is no clear evidence (either to the audience or the characters) that Kevin is gay. Aside from this, Kevin is patient and understanding, laughing about Will and Simon's truancy and drunk behaviour with their parents and trying his best to help Neil do well at school.

=== Neil's mum ===
Neil's mother is mentioned several times throughout the show. She is divorced from Neil's father, Kevin. Neil claims that she was in a "difficult place" ("in bed with your dad, who is a bender", as the other boys immediately scoff). She has since dated a man similar to Kevin, leading Neil to believe that she has a type. She bought Neil a motorbike for his eighteenth birthday, which Jay crashed shortly afterwards. She is the only parent among the four boys who does not appear in the series or the films.

=== Katie Sutherland ===
- Played by Kacey Barnfield
- 2009–2010

Katie is Neil's attractive elder sister who currently lives at home and has a boyfriend who works in a BP Garage. Katie is assertive and often loosely hostile towards the boys (bar her brother, Neil) and in "A Night Out In London" she rebukes Will, Jay and Simon for staring at her breasts.

=== Neil's granny ===
- Played by Stephanie Fayerman
- 2010

Neil's granny is seen only once, at Neil's 18th birthday party in "Will's Dilemma", and is dismayed when Neil tells Simon "not to spunk on his bed sheets". She is later disgusted by what she perceives as Will's mistreatment of Kerry.

=== Mr McKenzie ===
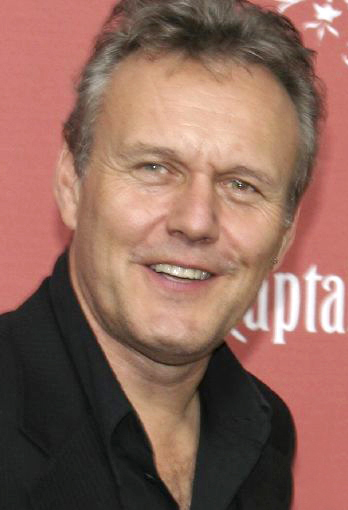
Anthony Head plays Mr McKenzie

- Played by Anthony Head
- 2011

Will's father is mentioned throughout the series but does not appear until the first film, in which he announces he has just married a woman who is, according to Will, only four years older than he is. It is also revealed that his marriage to Polly ended owing to him "shagging the work experience girl" and then leaving. He seems to have no real interest in Will owing to his social awkwardness, deeming him "weird". However, in the closing credits, he receives a picture of Will with Alison in Malia. Upon seeing it, he smiles (even appearing almost tearful), clearly proud of his son.

== Unseen characters ==
=== Katie Sutherland's boyfriend ===
Katie's boyfriend is first mentioned in the episode "Thorpe Park" in which Neil tells the boys that he works as a cashier at a local BP garage (the boys mistakenly assume that he's a mechanic). He is mentioned again later in the show where he is again referred to as a mechanic.

=== The Headmaster – Mr Hopkins ===
The Headmaster has a speaking role in a deleted scene in series 1 in which he is played by Martin Ball. In the first episode he can be seen sitting next to Mr Gilbert but he does not say anything. He does not appear in the assembly in the film.

=== Sadie Cunningham ===
Sadie is a girl in Jay's tutor group, and sits next to Jay. Jay often steals things out of her bag, including hair removal cream and an invite card to Louise Graham's birthday party. There is a real actor who plays Sadie and it turns out that she has a "voice only" part; in series 3 episode 1, when Neil is complaining with Simon that he cannot see the girls because of the curtain, one of the girls overhears and angrily tells Neil from the other side: "We can hear you". This is the voice of the actor who plays Sadie (it is revealed in the commentary from the main characters on the DVD).

=== Jack Stephens ===
Neil mentions that he dropped a ruler next to Miss Timms.

=== Chris Groves ===
In the first episode of series 2, Jay mentions that he has a mate in Year 13 by this name. It is alleged by Jay that he had sex with an older woman during a preceding geography and sociology field trip to the coast. He mentions his name again in the series 3 preview. Owing to the outlandish nature of Jay's claims, and Simon claiming he has never heard of him, it is questionable whether he even exists.

=== Sarah Bell ===
In the first episode of series 3, Neil is very annoyed that a curtain has been put up meaning he cannot see (or help) the girls getting changed for the fashion show. He mentions to Simon that he imagines that "Sarah Bell's got lovely big nipples", much to Sarah's disgust (who overhears from the other side of the curtain).

=== Jo Larken ===
Similarly to Sarah Bell, Neil quickly also tells Simon that he reckons "Jo Larken shaves her pubes" when he realises a curtain has been put up meaning he cannot see the girls.

=== Paul Keenan ===
In the first episode of series 3, "The Fashion Show", Paul is supposed to be modelling with Charlotte Hinchcliffe in the 1970s disco theme section. However, he supposedly drank a bottle of vodka and passed out owing to a mix of alcohol and nerves, leading Will to take his place, despite his previous criticisms of the fashion show, saying it was "exclusive vanity".

=== Chris Yates ===
In "The Fashion Show", Chris is supposed to be modelling with Carli D'Amato in the "Sexy Finale" Theme in which he had to wear Speedos, DMs, a top hat and a leash. But, according to Carli, his back was "disgustingly hairy" so she sacked him. He can actually be seen in the episode, if one looks behind Carli while she is talking to Simon, he can be seen in the background with a hairy back.

=== Chris Wharton ===
A boy Jay claims he used to sit next to in woodwork class, and who now works in a newsagent's. During "The Trip to Warwick", Jay tells Neil and Will the story of how Wharton got his head stuck in a bottle bank and by the time he was found in the morning he had been "arse-raped eighteen times". Neil believes the story, but Will does not, questioning how the first eighteen people who found Wharton "turned out to be opportunistic homosexual rapists" and why Wharton would tell Jay about the ordeal owing to its embarrassing nature.

=== Steve D'Amato ===
Steve is Carli's father. Carli tells Simon that he went ballistic when Simon vandalised their driveway, and Mr Cooper tells Simon that Steve threatened to "fuck him up" when he sneaks into Carli's brother Chris's bedroom in the middle of the night, which he mistook for Carli's.
