= List of The Inbetweeners episodes =

The Inbetweeners is a BAFTA Award-winning British sitcom created by Damon Beesley and Iain Morris, set in a fictional secondary school, and broadcast on E4. The series follows the lives of four suburban sixth form student friends – protagonist Will McKenzie (Simon Bird), his best friend Simon Cooper (Joe Thomas), and their friends Jay Cartwright (James Buckley) and Neil Sutherland (Blake Harrison). The series is narrated by Will, who is the programme's central character.

The first series consists of six episodes, starting with the first episode "First Day", which was shown on E4 on 1 May 2008, and ran until 29 May 2008. The second series began on 2 April 2009 with "The Field Trip" and ran for six episodes just like series 1, also on E4. The third series began on 13 September 2010 with "The Fashion Show" and ended on 18 October 2010 with "The Camping Trip". The third series also consisted of 6 episodes which makes each season 6 episodes and 18 episodes in the series in total.

== Series overview ==
Series	Episodes	Originally released	
Series	Episodes	First released	Last released
1	6	1 May 2008	29 May 2008
2	6	2 April 2009	7 May 2009
3	6	13 September 2010	18 October 2010
Film		17 August 2011; 6 August 2014	

== Episodes ==
=== Series 1 (2008) ===
No. overall	No. in series	Title	Directed by	Written by	Original release date	UK viewers (millions)
1	1	"First Day"	Gordon Anderson	Damon Beesley and Iain Morris	1 May 2008	0.32
Will McKenzie (Simon Bird) is forced to move from a private school to a state school, Rudge Park Comprehensive, as a result of his mother Polly's financial problems following her divorce. His first day at Rudge Park largely consists of mockery from fellow pupils owing to his formal appearance, notably his usage of a briefcase, and well-spoken nature. He also faces oppression from Mr Gilbert (Greg Davies), the arrogant and hostile head of sixth form, who forces Will and the other new enrolments to wear large, colourful badges introducing themselves, which quickly attracts ridicule from many other pupils. Mr Gilbert then orders Simon Cooper (Joe Thomas), a classmate, to accompany Will around the school, much to Simon's annoyance. While tagging along with Simon, Will meets his friends, the sex-obsessed, foul-mouthed and pathological liar Jay Cartwright (James Buckley) and the good natured but dim-witted Neil Sutherland (Blake Harrison), eventually joining them for a student gathering that evening at a local pub called The Black Horse. When they arrive at the pub, they find it strangely quiet, and while Jay succeeds in buying alcohol via the use of a fake ID, the bartender refuses to serve the others unless they also show proof of age. Eager to impress the trio, Will persists in attempting to illegally buy alcohol, finally succeeding in buying them all cider with the help of another punter. However, the boys suddenly notice that the pub they are in is actually The Black Bull, and so quickly make their way to the correct pub. Will is once again asked for proof of age when attempting to buy alcohol, and so finally loses his temper and reveals in an angry outburst that the pub is full of underage students; they are all thrown out and barred as a result. Although Simon is amused by Will's behaviour and stands by him as a new friend, the other students all take a great disliking towards him, particularly psychopathic school bully Mark Donovan.
2	2	"Bunk Off"	Gordon Anderson	Damon Beesley and Iain Morris	1 May 2008	0.36
After a month in state education, Will has made three friends: Simon Cooper, Jay Cartwright and Neil Sutherland. They all soon make arrangements to bunk off school, with Simon phoning the school office on the day and pretending to be his mother. After claiming that he and Will both have food poisoning, his call is passed through to Mr Gilbert, who instantly realises it is Simon putting on a female voice. Simon quickly hangs up, assuming the deception worked, and the boys then attempt to buy alcohol from a local off-licence, with Will using one of Simon's father's suits to disguise himself as an adult. The shopkeeper instantly deduces that Will is underage but offers to serve him providing he leaves immediately thereafter. The boys then head to Neil's house and begin drinking, only for Neil's father Kevin to arrive back earlier than expected with a carpenter. A drunken Will mocks Kevin's shocked reactions toward their behaviour, referencing Kevin's alleged closeted homosexuality, and is subsequently thrown out alongside Simon and Jay, while Neil is grounded. Still drunk, Simon then realises he loves Carli D'Amato, whom he has known for years, and so spray paints this on her driveway as a romantic gesture. Initially shocked, Carli quickly invites Simon to come over that evening when her parents are out after noticing Will and Jay quietly mocking him, suggesting he avoid her parents until the driveway is cleaned. Jay claims that Carli is impressed because Simon is drunk, and so recommends he get drunk even more. He does so, turning up at Carli's house that evening in a disoriented state, and inappropriately suggesting that she finger herself, before he vomits all over the kitchen owing to the drink. Will, who had invited himself over, tells Carli's seven-year-old brother Chris about dirty bombs while they watch a recreation of a terrorist attack on television, causing Chris to scream and cry before Simon vomits over him as well. When the boys return home, they find Polly, Kevin and Simon's parents Alan and Pamela waiting for them; they are scolded for their obnoxious behaviour and underage drinking. Simon attempts to blame Kevin, accusing him of molesting them, followed by Will claiming that they are alcoholics who need love and support; the adults mockingly laugh at them both in response. The next day at school, Mr Gilbert confronts the four boys, insisting that while Jay and Neil are not in trouble and are merely wasting opportunities owing to no legal requirement to attend sixth form, Simon and Will are owing to Simon fraudulently impersonating his mother when phoning the school. Both are forced to see the headmaster over the matter.
3	3	"Thorpe Park"	Gordon Anderson	Damon Beesley and Iain Morris	8 May 2008	0.31
Simon is about to sit his driving test but does not feel confident that he will pass first time. Will, Jay and Neil are over-optimistically discussing the prospects of one of the group owning a car, which leads to arrangements to go to Thorpe Park – where Neil works – providing Simon passes his practical test the next day. He is assessed by a female examiner who flirts with him. He ignores her advances and passes the test. As a present, Alan gives him a second-hand yellow Fiat Cinquecento Hawaii, which Simon responds to negatively but reluctantly accepts. He uses it to pick up Will and Jay and drive them to Thorpe Park, following a car full of girls before accidentally getting trapped within a funeral procession. Upon arrival, an impatient Jay carelessly opens the car door while Simon is trying to park, catching it on a nearby signpost and inadvertently ripping it off. Simon panics and insists he has to leave and get the door fixed, but Jay informs him that Neil's sister Katie's boyfriend works in a garage and so will easily be able to fix it. Simon believes him and stays, but they are forced to carry the door around the park. When inside, they eventually find Neil working as a mascot for one of the children's rides and witness him yelling in pain as a wasp flies into his costume. In the staff locker room, Neil discovers that his colleagues have stolen his clothes and so is forced to wear a tight vest and underpants from lost property. He joins the others as they later head to Nemesis Inferno, waiting an extra half an hour to guarantee them front seats, only for the ride attendant to inform them that only one seat is free at the front. Will angrily insults whoever is using the other seats, believing they have pushed in and denouncing them as "inconsiderate arseholes", only to quickly find out that they are from the Happy Foundation, a charity for people with Down syndrome. After the ride, Neil informs an enraged Simon that Katie's boyfriend is not, as they assumed, a mechanic, but works in a BP petrol garage and will not be able to fix the damaged car. Even worse, when they return to it, they find it has been vandalised by the same people Will had insulted, who drive away slowly while making insulting gestures as Simon is forced to phone his annoyed father for help.
4	4	"Will Gets a Girlfriend"	Gordon Anderson	Damon Beesley and Iain Morris	15 May 2008	0.44
The boys go to a Saturday night house party which is quickly deemed boring, but are left shocked when Charlotte Hinchcliffe, the most attractive and popular girl in the school, shows up with her friends and begins conversing with Will. They soon engage in heavy petting, but the experience is short-lived as Charlotte's psychopathic ex-boyfriend Mark Donovan shows up, forced to leave when Charlotte insists their relationship is over for good. Before he leaves, Donovan demands that Will treat Charlotte with respect, describing her as "kind and gentle and fragile", before threatening to kill him if he tells anyone he said that. The next day, when Charlotte brings up sex in conversation, Will lies about how many girls he has had sex with, leading Charlotte to suggest they meet up again soon to have sex themselves. After Will brags about it to his friends, Simon claims that Charlotte is just using him to get back at Donovan following their relationship issues, and so Will angrily insults him and storms off. That Friday, Will joins Charlotte at her house to have sex, but his lack of experience is made evident, and Charlotte abandons the idea after their failed attempt to have intercourse and requests he leave. The next day at school, Neil wins an unwanted date with a much younger geeky girl named Susie through the school's charity Blind Date event. Following this, Will finds himself dumped in front of the school when Charlotte takes part in the event to find a sexually experienced new lover. Heartbroken, Will rushes back home to his mother in tears, worried that he now has nothing after falling out with his friends over a girl who has now split up with him. However, Simon and Jay soon come to visit him after witnessing what happened at the Blind Date event, inviting him to come and join them in watching Neil on his blind date with Susie, who is revealed to be around twelve years old, meaning he has had to go to a fast food restaurant with her while the two are supervised by her mother. Throughout the episode, Jay is repeatedly teased by the others for having a friend outside of the group whom he says goodbye to with a thumbs up gesture at the opening party, eventually causing him to lose his temper and angrily jump up and down on the bonnet of the man's car, screaming that they are not friends, while Neil and Simon watch in disbelief. It is later revealed that Jay had to borrow £300 in order to pay for the car to be fixed.
5	5	"Caravan Club"	Gordon Anderson	Damon Beesley and Iain Morris	22 May 2008	0.43
After Jay's stories of guaranteed casual sex at the Camber Sands caravan club, of which his family are members, are constantly dubbed lies by the other boys, he reluctantly invites them to come to the club themselves to experience it for real. They agree, but the trip does not get off to a good start, with their first dinner in the van interrupted by Jay's obnoxious father Terry defecating loudly nearby and deterring them from eating. They later head to the main building at the complex for an evening party, which is revealed to be no more than a family disco within a small hall. However, while chatting to some adult guests, Will is approached by a flirtatious punk girl, who kisses him and demands they have sex. He quickly loses his chance when he tries to bond with her on a personal level, insisting they play together by skidding across the floor, causing the girl to leave in disbelief and some nearby children to steal Will's shoes. Meanwhile, after some flirty text exchanges, Simon tries his luck with Becky, a girl whom Jay claims to have repeatedly had sex with. They sneak out of the hall during the party and passionately kiss by the trees, but Becky is left shocked when Simon removes his trousers and pants and attaches a condom to his penis. Becky angrily claims that she was never planning to have sex, before running inside to tell her parents. Simon angrily confronts Jay for his lies and they leave after noticing Becky speaking to her parents; as they do, Will eventually gets one of the children teasing him into a headlock to retrieve his stolen shoes before leaving himself. The following morning, the trio bump into Neil, whom they could not find the previous night. Neil tells them that he slept in Simon's car and, on the dual carriageway during the journey home, reveals that he spent the night in the car with the punk girl performing extensive mutual masturbation, which explains why the seats are wet. Simon angrily pulls over and demands Neil clean up the mess, but Neil refuses as it is Simon's car, while Will and Jay argue over whether or not Jay truly lied about the sex potential of caravan club considering Neil ended up with a girl all night.
6	6	"Xmas Party"	Gordon Anderson	Damon Beesley and Iain Morris	29 May 2008	0.42
It is the end of Will's first term and he has been elected as chairman for the Christmas party committee, though is later revealed to have been the only applicant. He persuades Simon, Jay, and Neil to help him, though Jay only agrees to do so providing he can work as the party's DJ. An argument later ensues between the pair, with Jay insisting Charlotte Hinchcliffe only agreed to have sex with Will earlier in the term as part of a bet with one of her friends, leaving Will anxious to find out the truth. When Will later tries to discuss the prom itinerary with the rest of the students, he is approached by school bully Mark Donovan, who threatens violence against him if he goes near Charlotte during the prom. At the party, Simon attempts to impress Carli, arranging a plan with Jay to stop the music so he can confess his love, but is ultimately too nervous to do so when the moment finally comes. Luckily, everyone is distracted from Simon's embarrassment as a drunken Neil attempts to kiss his Biology teacher Miss Timms, renowned for her attractive appearance amongst many students, and is consequently reprimanded by Mr Gilbert. Will is later approached by Charlotte, who ignores his question over whether or not their relationship was a bet and instead happily kisses him after praising his work on the party. Witnessing the whole thing, Donovan soon appears and angrily threatens Will, but the other students all stand up for Will owing to his work on the party and demand that Donovan leave him alone; Donovan then spots a disgusted Charlotte walking away and sadly pursues her. Will subsequently prepares to a read thank you speech he has written, only to be ignored as everyone resumes partying. Later, with the party over, the boys reflect on their past term while relaxing on a trampoline in the school gym, with Simon and Neil both praising Will's work on the prom itself, and Will overjoyed to know that Charlotte never dated him as part of a bet. Jay then appears and tells the boys he has just received a blowjob in the DJ booth, but then admits it was only a "handjob outside of the trousers". After gentle teasing, he then dives on the rest of the boys, who all happily begin playfighting on the trampoline.

=== Series 2 (2009) ===
No. overall	No. in series	Title	Directed by	Written by	Original release date	UK viewers (millions)
7	1	"The Field Trip"	Ben Palmer	Damon Beesley and Iain Morris	2 April 2009	1.21
As the new term begins in January, the boys are going on the annual Geography and Sociology field trip to Swanage, which Jay claims is home to a renowned MILF who has sex with one male pupil from the trip on each occasion. Although Neil does not study either of the subjects, he is allowed to come along after agreeing to help Mr Kennedy, a teacher whom many believe to be a paedophile. The boys arrive early to secure seats at the back of the coach but are quickly forced to move by Donovan when he arrives. Will finds himself with a stroke of luck when he ends up sitting next to Lauren Harris, a pretty new Northern Irish girl whom he is instantly attracted to. Despite his efforts to win her over, Lauren instead finds herself attracted to Simon, partly owing to Will's social ineptitude and jealousy. Upon arrival at Swanage, Jay and Neil unsuccessfully try to find the alleged MILF by asking questions to random women in the street, passing them off as school surveys, which ultimately results in Jay getting slapped in public. Later that night, Neil brings a bottle of vodka to the room, given to him by Mr Kennedy after the two went swimming during the day, which is soon taken by Donovan when they try to bring it to a party being held in his room nearby. Lauren then arranges to meet up with Simon the following day during some free time, which Simon accepts, only for Carli to do the same thing the next day. Simon selfishly dismisses his arrangement with Lauren and accepts Carli's offer instead, which Will uses as a chance to take an upset Lauren out on a boat that he hired for the afternoon. While preparing the boat and waiting for Lauren, Will is found by Jay, Neil, and Simon, who encourage him to take them all out on the boat before Lauren arrives, which he eventually does despite initial refusal. A number of unfortunate incidents occur, including Simon falling into the water and developing hypothermia, Neil accidentally catching and killing a large fish, and the boat itself abruptly breaking down, leaving the boys stranded within the harbour. Jay panics, carelessly setting off an emergency flare in the process. They are all soon towed back to shore in front of many people, including other pupils on the field trip, and left humiliated as a result. Soon after the field trip, it is revealed Lauren has moved away and left the school.
8	2	"Work Experience"	Ben Palmer	Damon Beesley and Iain Morris	9 April 2009	1.18
It is Valentine's Day and Jay is showing off a number of cards he supposedly received, each with sexually explicit messages inside, which Will and Simon instantly suspect are all fakes written by Jay himself. Simon, however, receives a genuine card from Hannah Fields, a girl in the year below, though he remains keen to ensure Carli does not find out. Will later catches up with Charlotte, to whom he sent a card and a bouquet of flowers, and she invites him along to keep her company at an under-18s' disco that she will be supervising that Friday. Mr Gilbert soon arrives and hands out the confirmation of everyone's work experience placements; Jay has set him and Simon up at his father's plant hire, while Will's request to be placed at a local newspaper is mixed up with Neil's request to work at a local car garage (this was actually his secondary request, as his first was to drive a plane). Mr Gilbert refuses to swap the placements owing to his hostile attitude and active disliking of Will, and Will is forced to attend the garage. Though his colleagues Jim, Wolfie and Steve greet him amicably on his first day, he quickly develops a negative relationship with them after branding the workplace "dirty" and "not academic", and is subsequently thrown into a lake by them as a prank. When they later mock his lack of sexual success, Will pretends that Charlotte is his girlfriend, telling lies about how he had sex with her multiple times, among other things, and reveals he will be meeting her that night at the under-18s' disco. Wolfie claims that he will be able to attend and find out whether Will is telling the truth, as he claims to be just 17 years old despite looking much older. At the disco, Simon meets Hannah Fields, who secretly offers him alcohol before passionately kissing him and giving him a handjob. The others quickly feel uncomfortable when watching it, and it is ultimately cut short when Simon is attacked by Danny Moore, a much younger and aggressive pupil whom Simon accidentally bumped into the previous day. Danny pushes Simon to the floor and repeatedly kicks him in the groin before being escorted away by the bouncers. Hannah, embarrassed to see Simon beaten up by a child, decides to leave. The boys then witness Danny speaking to a group of tough-looking young men and start panicking; Will rushes to find Charlotte for help, only for Wolfie to arrive as soon as he finds her. Wolfie relays all of the things that Will said about Charlotte, which she immediately dismisses as lies, angrily throwing a drink in Will's face and branding him a "nasty little virgin". Will then asks Wolfie for help, but he refuses and leaves, forcing Will to phone his mother to come and pick him and the others up as a last resort. They all hide in the toilets until she arrives; when she does, it is announced across the entire building, causing the disco crowd to burst out laughing. Will remains hopeful that he will finally be able to work at the newspaper the following week, only to find out from Neil that they have decided to keep him as their current intern, considering him the best they have ever had despite his blatant laziness, much to Will's dismay and frustration.
9	3	"Will's Birthday"	Ben Palmer	Damon Beesley and Iain Morris	16 April 2009	1.05
When the boys meet up in the school common room, Jay shows the others a flyer for a house party being held by Louise Graham that weekend. Simon is pleased to see that they have been invited to their first cool party, but Jay reveals that he merely stole it from another pupil's bag, suggesting they try to sneak in. Will then reminds them that the party clashes with his "sophisticated" 17th birthday dinner which he arranged a month ago, eventually persuading them to attend that instead. The boys all attempt to find dates for Will's dinner, only to discover that most of the popular and attractive girls are going to Louise's party, including Will's love interest, Charlotte, who merely signs off mid conversation when Will invites her over instant messaging. A frustrated Simon is also forced to look after his French exchange student Patrice, who Will insists is also invited to the party. Will's birthday arrives and his mother Polly, who incorrectly assumes the legal age to drive is eighteen and so continues to save for Will's driving lessons, gives Will an unflattering black vest that she thinks makes him look cool. Though Will strongly dislikes it, he reluctantly accepts it to avoid upsetting his mother and promises to wear it that night. The night does not get much better as his friends arrive at the dinner party that evening with no girls; Simon was too nervous to invite his love interest Carli and Jay claiming that his supposed date had to fly to Paris for a modelling job, which the others refuse to believe. They consequently try to invite some girls Jay and Neil passed in the street, only to find them binge drinking and revealed to be just 11–13 years old. The girls aggressively brand them paedophiles and the boys quickly leave. Will notices an unpaid stripper that Jay and Neil had booked arguing with Polly when they return home. His party ruined, Will finally gives in and agrees to go to Louise's party instead. Upon arrival, Louise refuses to let them in because the house is full, though is quickly attracted to Patrice and so brings him inside while shutting the others out. Still desperate to get in, they ultimately climb over Louise's fence, except Will who crawls through a small gap, covering his jacket in dog faeces in the process. A bemused Louise then reveals that her not inviting them was simply owing to her not knowing them very well, but finally allows them to stay providing Will removes his dirty jacket, exposing the vest beneath and inviting ridicule from the other partygoers. Will promptly searches the house for Charlotte, soon finding her and Patrice in a bedroom upstairs having sex. He leaves angrily, receiving a brief respite from the bad day when Donovan turns up looking for Charlotte. Will reveals that she is upstairs and is left satisfied by the prospect of Patrice getting beaten up. When they leave the party, they are again spotted by the same group of drunken young girls; one of them promptly sends her older brother chasing after the boys with a cricket bat.
10	4	"A Night Out in London"	Ben Palmer	Damon Beesley and Iain Morris	23 April 2009	1.02
Will decides the boys need to develop a good social reputation, suggesting one option is to regularly go clubbing in central London. Jay and Neil agree, but Simon is reluctant to do so, worried about the dangers of London late at night. He is later persuaded to go after Neil says that he has a car and will happily drive the group there. Simon then invites Carli and her friend Rachel to go with them; they accept, with Will believing that Rachel fancies him after briefly speaking to her. As the boys prepare for the night out, Neil presents his new car, only to inform them that it has no engine and that he thought the plan was for him to drive Simon's car despite not being insured to do so. An enraged Simon berates Neil for his idiocy, but the prospect of going clubbing with Carli eventually persuades him to drive. As they travel to London, Jay shouts "bus wankers!" at a group of people waiting at a bus stop, and Neil, desperate to use the toilet, eventually urinates into an empty beer can before cutting his glans penis on it. When they arrive in London that evening, Jay again screams "bus wankers!" at several people waiting at a bus stop, oblivious to the traffic ahead, which forces Simon to stop the car. Two tough looking men from the bus stop then walk over, briefly throttling Simon through the window as he apologises several times in fear, which Jay and Neil later mock him over. After searching for a parking space for over an hour, Simon reluctantly parks in front of a shutter door where a clamp warning is posted, persuaded to do so after Jay insists that clamping rules are different on weekends and when Will warns him that Carli will lose interest in going clubbing with him if he turns up too late. Upon arrival at the club, Simon is refused entry owing to wearing trainers, and so desperately tries to fix the situation by swapping them for a homeless man's dirty, urine-stained shoes, which allows him entry into the club. Both his and Will's "dates" go badly, with Rachel enjoying the company of another man and demanding Will leaves them alone, and Carli left disgusted by Simon after finding out that his shoes are soaked with urine and taken from a homeless person. Neil spends a lengthy amount of time trying to painfully urinate in the toilets with his cut penis, groaning awkwardly while doing so, and is eventually thrown out of the club after being suspected of masturbating; consequently, the boys all decide to go home. Once they return to Simon's car, they find it has been clamped by the man whose garage door they blocked, with him angrily demanding £200 compensation for the car having prevented him from using his van to make business deliveries. The boys take shelter in the car as the man, quickly losing his temper, angrily screams at them while shaking the car violently.
11	5	"The Duke of Edinburgh Awards"	Ben Palmer	Damon Beesley and Iain Morris	30 April 2009	1.21
Will is selected to run the school's Duke of Edinburgh Award scheme; though pleased, he is told by Mr Gilbert that he was chosen because he is a virgin. Although Jay refuses to sign up, Neil and Simon agree to do so when they hear of some of the potential activities involved. However, much to their frustration, Will merely signs them up for care work at a local retirement home to fulfil one of the course's first modules, organising it alongside his former babysitter Daisy, who works at the home herself. Will promptly develops a crush on Daisy, and eventually persuades her to go on a date with him after he volunteers himself and his friends to cover multiple shifts for her so that she can attend her closest friend's hen do. However, Simon later informs Will that he can longer be part of it, instead needing to spend time with his father after his parents have a trial separation. As a last resort, Will reluctantly pays Jay to cover Simon's shifts. Will then covers Daisy's overnight shift by himself but is left extremely tired the next day and ultimately falls asleep in the school common room. Jay and Neil then take the opportunity to put hair removal cream down Will's trousers as a prank, causing his pubic hair to fall out in the shower later that day. Will worries what Daisy will think if he manages to have sex with her and, following awful advice from Simon, stuffs the wig of a female resident of the home down his underpants almost immediately before his date. After he and Daisy have dinner together, a tipsy Daisy kisses Will and asks him to return home with her. She begins kissing and fondling Will on the bed, much to his delight, but soon finds the wig in Will's pants. Will explains that he has no pubic hair, which leads a guilt-ridden Daisy to believe that he is prepubescent and thus far too young for sex. The next day, Will tries to explain the truth, but Daisy is left too embarrassed to talk to him. Eventually bored watching the elderly residents, Jay sneaks off to a seemingly empty bedroom to masturbate, doing so over a picture of a young woman in a bikini. However, he panics upon ejaculating when an elderly woman in a nearby bed turns the light on and cheerfully greets him. The photo is revealed to be the woman when she was younger; her son soon arrives and shakes Jay's hand, covering his own in Jay's semen. The school is kicked off the course and the boys are reprimanded by Mr Gilbert as a result. Will promptly refuses to pay Jay for covering Simon's shifts owing to his actions getting them removed from the course and ruining Will's chances of having sex with Daisy.
12	6	"Exam Time" "End of Term"	Ben Palmer	Damon Beesley and Iain Morris	7 May 2009	1.21
All the boys face their upcoming exams as the first year of sixth form is coming to an end. Will is overworking himself and relying on energy drinks and caffeine pills to keep him awake when revising, while Simon and Neil dismiss their revision altogether: Simon instead helping Carli revise for her A-Level Geography exams as another effort to win her affections, and Neil repeatedly playing Pro Evolution Soccer, which he considers ideal revision for his PE exam. Meanwhile, Jay finds himself smitten by his first genuine girlfriend, grammar school student Chloe, whom he treats with great respect. During their first revision session, Carli tells Simon that she has split up with her boyfriend Tom and, in their next session, kisses and promises to join him at a local pub for an end-of-term celebratory drink as an act of gratitude. Will's revision efforts continue to go horribly wrong, leaving him confused over anything he reads and later over the meanings of basic words. Simon suggests he get more sleep and stop drinking energy drinks, but Will refuses, insisting that they help. Jay soon becomes increasingly paranoid over Chloe's sex life, fearing that it has been more successful than his own. Following advice from his father, he sends her countless messages via SMS, Facebook, Bebo, and Myspace each day as an attempt to keep track of where she is at all times. When the exams begin, both Simon and Jay are too distracted with their love lives to do any work, while Neil forgets his PE kit and so is forced to carry out physical activities in his underpants. As a result of drinking energy drinks so frequently, Will begins to develop gastrointestinal problems and ultimately soils himself during his final exam. He becomes unexpectedly cheerful about this, reasoning that since the most embarrassing thing possible has now happened, he has nothing further to fear. He meets the others at the pub hours after they arrive, wearing tracksuit bottoms from lost property and resigning himself to having likely failed the exam entirely. After telling the others what happened, he begins getting drunk to forget his awful day. Meanwhile, Simon and Jay end up dumped by their respective girls: Carli arrives at the pub with Tom and announces they have got back together, while Chloe, frustrated by Jay's frequent calls and messages, tells him that he is too sensitive and needy for her. Jay bursts into tears as Will comforts him, and the boys promptly leave the pub and drive home. As they do, Simon, Jay, and Neil issue new insulting nicknames for Will relating to his incident in the exam, which he fears will always be remembered by the other students.

=== Series 3 (2010) ===
No. overall	No. in series	Title	Directed by	Written by	Original release date	UK viewers (millions)
13	1	"The Fashion Show"	Ben Palmer	Damon Beesley and Iain Morris	13 September 2010	3.46
The school is hosting a charity fashion show, organised by Carli and kidney transplant patient Alistair Scott, in order to raise money for a new dialysis machine for the local hospital. Simon is given the chance to model by Carli, while Jay, despite persistent efforts to get himself noticed, is refused. Will perceives the event as nothing more than a popularity contest, but is forced into collecting the funds by Mr Gilbert, who agrees with Will's opinion but still threatens him with detention if he refuses. Will uses it as an opportunity to openly express his opinion to guests of the event, which angers Alistair and triggers a rivalry between the two. Charlotte, now a university student, turns up at the event as a special guest model, soon asking Will to assist her at the last minute after her original show companion passed out while drunk. Will immediately dismisses his initial beliefs and decides to help, further frustrating Alistair and an envious Jay, who is eventually forced to visit the school nurse when his own efforts to pierce his ears leave them infected and pus ridden. Though Charlotte is appreciative towards Will for his help and admits that she would be happy to have a boyfriend like him, she laughs off the thought of them being a couple, and so Will refuses to join her any further. Meanwhile, Carli fires her original partner for the show's finale after seeing his excessive body hair and quickly asks Simon to replace him. Though hesitant to do so after seeing the outfit as just a top hat and a pair of Speedos, Simon eventually agrees in the hopes of Carli finally going out with him. However, putting the outfit on in a rush leaves his left testicle protruding out from the Speedo pants, and so he performs the entire act unaware it is visible to the audience. Once Carli finds out, she assumes it was a deliberate way to mock her, angrily storming off and leaving Simon humiliated. Neil, who had been helping out backstage, is once again the victim of sexual advances by Mr Kennedy, who is stopped by Mr Gilbert when trying to fondle Neil while drunk. Simon and Will meet up with Jay and Neil once the show comes to an end, Simon bitter towards Neil for not helping him with his finale outfit, and Jay forced to wear a sizeable bandage around his head as a result of his infected ears. As they leave the building, Neil abruptly admits to Will that he once snogged Charlotte and gestures to Simon and Jay that he had also fingered her.
14	2	"The Gig and the Girlfriend"	Ben Palmer	Damon Beesley and Iain Morris	20 September 2010	3.34
On their way to school that morning, the boys notice school bully Mark Donovan and several other students smoking cannabis in the street, which leaves Will shocked. Jay then claims that most people smoke it regularly, even himself, and insists he can supply it to them whenever they need it, which Will dismisses as lies. Later, in the school common room, Simon meets Tara, a very pretty girl in the year below whom he quickly falls for. In an attempt to impress her, Simon agrees to go with her that evening to a gig hosted by Failsafe, also promising to bring a supply of cannabis. He later asks Jay to provide him with some, only for Jay to claim that his dealer has travelled to Afghanistan to acquire drugs from source, angering Simon who realises Jay was indeed lying the entire time. In order to regain his friends' trust, Jay tries to buy weed from Donovan who mockingly gives him tea leaves and threatens Jay for challenging him, and so Jay quickly accepts it and leaves. Moments before the boys leave that evening, Simon discovers it is tea and is left further enraged. At the gig, Jay and Neil search the area for a dealer, soon finding a young man who, after a brief argument, supplies them with cannabis. The boys then begin smoking it alongside Tara just outside the building, bar Will who continues to insist it is illegal and harmful. Jay and Neil later tease Will about his negative attitude towards drugs, believing he is simply too scared to take them, and so an annoyed Will eats the rest of the cannabis to prove them otherwise. Meanwhile, Simon inadvertently injures Tara within a mosh pit which, combined with her being stoned, results in her coming over faint and very nauseous. Simon asks her if she feels sick or is actually going to be sick. She replies she doesn't feel very well and is going to puke. Simon tries to kiss her but, overwhelmed by nausea she projectile vomits over herself, Simon, their shoes and the floor. After she's been sick everywhere, the two share a passionate kiss but her stomach has other plans and a retching Tara runs to the toilets to throw up again. Will then begins to feel incredibly dizzy as a result of taking the cannabis, and begs Jay to call an ambulance; Jay refuses out of fear of getting arrested for drug dealing. Will then tries to seek help from Simon and Neil, but Simon is too busy pacifying a stoned, drunk and frightened Tara who has wet herself and been sick twice more. Neil ultimately falls asleep after taking numerous sleeping pills in an attempt to get high himself. Feeling hopeless, Will finally stands on the stage and begs the entire audience to help him, and so is kindly escorted away by the bouncers. An ambulance eventually arrives and takes him to hospital; Jay, believing it is a police van, flees in horror, while Simon and Tara, still stoned, continue kissing and canoodling.
15	3	"Will's Dilemma"	Ben Palmer	Damon Beesley and Iain Morris	27 September 2010	3.57
For Neil's 18th birthday, his mother buys him a motorcycle, which Jay badly damages after crashing it into a wall. owing to his financial difficulties, Neil's father Kevin is unable to get Neil any presents and instead allows him a house party, during which he is allowed to invite ten friends. The next day, Simon and his now-girlfriend Tara arrange a double date with Will and Tara's friend Kerry at the Waterside shopping centre. Though Will dislikes Kerry owing to her boring personality and imposing height, he is keen to stay with her owing to her supposed habit of giving all of her previous boyfriends blowjobs. Jay and Neil also visit Waterside, secretly following Simon and Will around on their double date, but are quickly spotted by a frustrated Will, whom they repeatedly tease over Kerry's height. Later, while on their own, Jay and Neil notice Mr Gilbert looking at soft toys in a gift shop, jokingly shouting out his name and running away before he can spot them. They then purchase a bumper sticker which reads "Honk If You Want a Blowjob" and stick it on the back of Simon's car without him realising. Simon finally meets Tara's parents after driving her home that evening; her father takes a prompt disliking toward him after hearing him swear and seeing the car's bumper sticker, branding it "dirty", despite Simon insisting that he did not put it there. The next day at school, Jay and Neil mention Waterside when Mr Gilbert passes them in the common room and are immediately issued four weeks of after school detention. At Neil's party, which he subsequently arrives late to, Will is continuously deterred by Kerry's strange and clingy behaviour, and insists that he does not want to be her boyfriend. Despite only meeting him the other day, Kerry is left heartbroken, abruptly bursting into tears and spreading lies to the other party members that Will used her for sex before dumping her because of her height. Tara, who was giving Simon a handjob in Neil's bedroom, rushes downstairs after she hears Kerry crying, angered that Will dumped her and revealing that her father died the previous month. Though initially sympathetic, Will quickly insists that it is not relevant to the situation. The other party members are left disgusted, and Kevin promptly demands Will to leave and never return. As he leaves, Will berates Simon for failing to inform him that Kerry's father had died, and is ultimately grounded for three weeks when Kevin informs Will's mother Polly of the incident. The next day at school, Will apologises to Neil for ruining his birthday, but Neil insists he still enjoyed it as when the other guests left, Kerry gave him multiple blowjobs.
16	4	"The Trip to Warwick" "Trip to Warwick"	Ben Palmer	Damon Beesley and Iain Morris	4 October 2010	3.62
While Simon and Tara passionately French kiss and fondle one another in his bedroom, they are promptly interrupted by Simon's parents, who request he leave the door open when having girls in his bedroom, much to Simon's anger and embarrassment. When alone, Tara insists to Simon that they should have sex, believing they are both clearly in love and ready for it. Simon suggests the garden or his car as ideal places for privacy, but a shocked Tara rejects both locations, instead suggesting they visit her sister Sophie in Warwick and have sex in her student house. Simon discusses this with the others, but is quickly left anxious when Jay and Neil insist that he needs a plan to have sex successfully, and so they invite themselves along to offer advice. Will joins them, using it as an opportunity to look around the University of Warwick, one of his university choices, though also to avoid being left out and feeling lonely. Tara is left frustrated as a result, more so when Simon forces her to sit in the back of the overcrowded car because Neil called "shotgun", and when Neil continuously farts during the journey and leaves her feeling sick. Once the group arrive at Sophie's house, Sophie insists that she does not like the idea of Simon and Tara having sex, and remains fairly hostile toward Simon as a result. Joe, Sophie's housemate, invites his two friends over to play drinking games, which Jay and Neil quickly participate in. Will, initially trying to discuss the university with them, is left frustrated by their obnoxious behaviour and nonsensical conversations, and is subsequently branded "boring". Meanwhile, Simon and Tara begin kissing in the kitchen; Sophie requests they stop and go somewhere private, allowing them to use her bedroom to have sex but still left worried that Tara will not enjoy it and will ultimately regret it. After she leaves, Tara tries to take Simon to the bedroom but angrily storms off when Simon claims he needs to have a quick chat with Jay about dinner. With Tara gone, a worried Simon then admits to Jay that he will likely have an orgasm too quickly; though Will insists that Simon should just be honest with Tara, Simon dismisses his advice in favour of Jay's, and so quickly masturbates beforehand. Simon and Tara are both naked and kissing amorously in bed, but – now in a refractory period – Simon begins to suffer impotence and repeatedly struggles to have sex properly. Meanwhile, Neil, who had downed a bottle of orangeade riddled with cigarette butts, begins losing control of his bladder and urinates a green, foul-smelling urine. A drunken Jay then approaches Sophie and her attractive Dutch housemate Heike, insisting they all have sex together. When trying to throw Jay out of the house, Sophie discovers that Neil has urinated everywhere, and is soon approached by a scared Tara, who flees the bedroom after Simon loses his temper and begins slapping his penis manically. Simon quickly follows her when he achieves a semi-erection, only to find himself standing naked in front of everyone. Sophie threatens to call the police if they do not leave, and so they are forced to sleep in Simon's car and endure the long drive home naked the next morning. During the journey home, a hungover Jay vomits profusely, and Simon receives a text from Tara telling him never to contact her again.
17	5	"Home Alone"	Ben Palmer	Damon Beesley and Iain Morris	11 October 2010	3.72
Will's mother Polly goes away for the weekend with an old college friend, Fergus, after they catch up through Facebook, much to Will's annoyance. Afraid to be home alone for the night, Will invites Simon to stay over, but Simon is unable to owing to a father and son golf tournament he is attending. Though Jay offers to stay over instead, Will refuses owing to his sexual obsession with Polly, and instead asks Neil, who agrees providing he can bring his PlayStation 3 to avoid playing Will's Nintendo Wii games. Jay is left frustrated by the decision, craving the opportunity to be away from his dog Benji, who stares at him or howls at the bedroom door whenever he tries to masturbate. He soon attempts to run away from Benji in public, but Benji continues following him. Eventually, Jay easily makes it inside Will's house after Neil leaves the front door open, and they both begin making a mess. Will demands they go outside for a while, and is taken by the others on a "pussy patrol"; revealed to be no more than slowly driving around the estate while playing loud music. During the drive, Jay angrily runs over and kills a squirrel after it continues to slyly avoid his car at the last minute, leaving both Will and Neil shocked and disgusted, and Jay eventually feeling remorseful. When they return to the house, they find Simon waiting for them, having made his way in after Neil left the back door open, leaving Will further frustrated. Will then answers the front door to find a man delivering a large supply of Foster's Lager, which Jay admits he ordered via the credit card details left by Polly for emergencies. While trying to return the lager online, Will finds inappropriate content posted on his Facebook account, also discovering that Jay has changed the password. Jay promises to tell Will the new one on the condition that he allows them all to stay. Will finally agrees but forces them all to go back out when they begin vandalising the back garden. They wander the estate while drinking and begin vandalising a front garden which Jay and Neil had also vandalised earlier that day. Will reluctantly takes part and begins to enjoy it, but the boys quickly run away when the owner of the house sees them and threatens to call the police. Upon returning home, Jay and Neil masturbate in private while Simon and Will take shots while playing Pro Evolution Soccer. The boys find themselves extremely hungover the next morning, Simon shocked to see that he is over an hour late to his golf tournament and quickly notice the man whose front garden they vandalised angrily banging the front door to try and confront them. Polly soon returns home and the man angrily explains to her what the boys have done. Shortly after, Jay enters the room in tears, explaining that his father had Benji put down after Jay, keen to masturbate in private and so trying to get Benji locked out of the house, lied that he had been continuously defecating indoors, with his father believing dogs are near death at that point anyway. It is also revealed Will's mum was eventually dumped by Fergus as he did not want to be dealing with a "problem child". During the episode, Jay and Neil vandalise a layout of flowers beside a roundabout that reads "WELCOME TO OUR VILLAGE", altering it to display "WE CUM TIT VILLAGE". Mr Gilbert approaches Will over the matter, believing he would know who the culprits are, but Will insists he does not and that he would have reported them immediately if he did. Mr Gilbert believes him, but then gives him a few days to find out and threatens to sabotage his UCAS application if he fails to do so. Will later discovers that it was Jay and Neil, but reluctantly refuses to report them to avoid being a "grass"; it is not revealed what happens to his UCAS application as a result.
18	6	"The Camping Trip" "Camping"	Damon Beesley and Iain Morris	Damon Beesley and Iain Morris	18 October 2010	3.70
Simon's parents tell him that the family are moving to Swansea in two weeks owing to Alan's company making many employees redundant. Simon is left shocked at the thought of no longer seeing his friends or Carli ever again, berating his parents for the decision and insisting that he will try and move into a local flat with Jay instead. Meanwhile, Neil is also worried after having sex with Karen, an older work colleague at Asda, who informs Neil that she tested positive, which he assumes refers to a pregnancy test. Will suggests the boys go on a camping trip before going their separate ways, but Simon instead decides to use the time to try and confess his love for Carli. He later phones Will the following night while drunk outside Carli's house, preparing to climb in through her window and have sex with her. Will panics and rushes over to stop him, but arrives just as Simon is climbing in through the bedroom window. Simon begins fondling whom he believes to be Carli in bed, only to discover that it is her younger brother Chris. He tries to leave quietly, but Chris cries for his father, and so Simon flees with Will. When Carli's father bans Simon from going near their house again, Simon finally agrees to go on the camping trip Will had arranged. Though Will organises the trip constructively, the others make a mess of things, quickly building a fire by burning several of Will's possessions with petrol. Jay suggests they play a game. Neil alludes to Jay possibly being sexually abused as a child, asking if they will be playing the same "game" Jay did with his neighbour in his garden shed. Will, initially frustrated, eventually cheers up as they all play a game where they swap phones and send vulgar texts to each other's contacts. Will then finally persuades the others to play Monopoly, which they do for many hours, but eventually insists they should stop and call it a draw when it is too dark to see anything. Jay, on the verge of winning, refuses and ultimately tries to use Simon's car headlights to allow them to see, but forgets to apply the handbrake after turning the car to face them all. The car quickly rolls down the hill toward the lake; Jay misplaces the keys, and so Will and Simon are forced to find something to break the car's window and get inside while Jay and Neil hold it in place. They both give up after feeling tired and allow the car to roll into the lake just as Will and Simon rush back. His car gone for good, Simon goes into a hateful outburst towards them all, but soon calms down when they offer him a drink, admitting that he never liked the car anyway. They later receive replies from the texts they sent earlier: Neil discovers, strangely to his relief, that Karen's text actually referred to a diagnosis of chlamydia as a result of unprotected sex, while Jay's dad replies to him by saying that Jay's mother was right about sending him to a shrink, which Jay awkwardly laughs off and dismisses as lies. Simon then receives a reply from a sexual text Jay sent to Carli on his phone and is visibly pleased with what it says, though he refuses to reveal it to the others. They go to bed in the tent shortly afterward, but Neil, having eaten undercooked sausages earlier in the day, begins vomiting everywhere; the repulsive smell causes Simon and Jay to vomit also, and the boys are left no choice but to walk home in the end.

== See also ==
- The Inbetweeners Movie
- The Inbetweeners 2
