= Iain Morris =

English writer

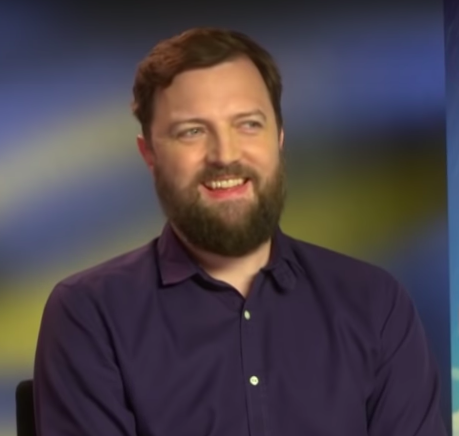
- Iain Morris in 2018
- Born: Iain Kevan Morris; 6 August 1973 (age 53); Woking, Surrey, England
- Occupation: Writer
- Spouse: Marchelle Bradanini (m. 2011)
- Writing career
- Years active: 1999–present

Iain Kevan Morris (born 6 August 1973) is an English writer. He is best known for creating The Inbetweeners with his writing partner Damon Beesley and co-hosting a show on London radio station XFM with stand-up comedian Jimmy Carr.

He featured in the "Iron" and "Music" episodes of cult spoof TV show Look Around You, as well as on Jimmy Carr's second live DVD, as a panellist on a feature named Comedy Idol. Other writing credits include two episodes of HBO's Flight of the Conchords: Season One's "The Actor" and Season Two's "Unnatural Love". Morris also co-wrote the screenplay alongside Taika Waititi for the 2023 sports comedy Next Goal Wins and co-scripted the football comedy series The First Team for the BBC in 2020.

== Personal life ==
Morris was educated at Hampton School and studied theology at the University of Bristol.

Morris married American singer and DJ Marchelle Bradanini on 14 May 2011 in Palm Springs, California, United States.

Morris supports West London football club Queens Park Rangers.
