= Kenton Allen =

British television producer and executive

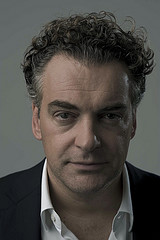
- Born: 16 June 1965 (age 61); Stourbridge, Worcestershire, England
- Occupation: Chief Executive of Big Talk Studios
- Years active: 1990–present
- Television: Tonight with Jonathan Ross; The Royle Family; Six Shooter; Funland; The Visit; The Omid Djalili Show; That Mitchell and Webb Look; Ideal; After You've Gone; Massive; Rev. Him & Her; Friday Night Dinner; King Of... Show Me The Funny; Chickens; Free Agents (US); Threesome
- Website: https://bigtalkstudios.com/

Kenton Allen is a British television producer and executive. He became Chief Executive of Big Talk Studios in September 2008. His credits include the BAFTA Award-winning sitcoms The Royle Family and Rev. and the Oscar-winning film Six Shooter. He was the Advisory Chair of the Media Guardian Edinburgh International Television Festival 2012.

== Early life ==
He was born in Stourbridge, Worcestershire and educated at the Grange Comprehensive School, and King Edward VI College, Stourbridge. He turned down a place to study the clarinet and saxophone at the Royal School of Music. In 1983, aged 18, he joined the BBC at Pebble Mill in Birmingham. His first BBC job was as a trainee studio manager, working on radio, TV and film productions as a sound recordist on productions including Howards' Way, Pebble Mill at One, and The Archers, where he spent three months doing spot Fx and once played Aunt Laura's dead body wrapped in ¼ inch recording tape.

== Radio ==
=== BBC Radio (1986–1990) ===
In 1986 he moved to BBC Radio Nottingham where he briefly worked as a producer/presenter. This led to two simultaneous job offers from BBC Radio 4 and BBC Radio 1. He took both and worked for a year as a producer on Ned Sherrin's Sony award-winning Loose Ends for BBC Radio 4 before moving to BBC Radio 1 in 1988 where he became the station's youngest ever producer. At BBC Radio 1 he produced Simon Bates, Steve Wright in the Afternoon, Walters Weekly presented by John Peel's producer John Walters and created a new series Jonathan Ross Live from Ronnie Scott's, which was broadcast live from Ronnie Scott's Jazz Club on Fridays at 6 pm for 13 weeks. The script for the series was written by Danny Baker and the diverse range of guests included a memorable appearance by Robert Maxwell.

== Television ==
=== Channel X (1990–1994) ===
In 1990 he joined the recently formed independent production company Channel X to produce all of Jonathan Ross's shows. He produced over 200 live editions of Tonight with Jonathan Ross for Channel 4. In 1991 he produced Jonathan Ross Presents Madonna, which became Channel 4's highest rated entertainment programme of the year. Other credits include the innovative live comedy entertainment series Saturday Zoo which featured the live television debuts of the likes of Steve Coogan, John Thompson, Lily Savage, and Mark Thomas, and the factual entertainment hit Fantastic Facts for ITV.

=== Granada (1994–1997) ===
In 1994, he joined Granada Television's Entertainment Department where he developed and produced a wide range of comedy and entertainment programming including Lucky Numbers, The Shane Richie Experience, Stars in Their Eyes and The Mrs Merton Show. He was appointed Head of Development, and ran all of Granada's entertainment development across the full spectrum of the entertainment genre.

=== Lucky Dog Ltd (1998–1999) ===
In February 1998, he became managing director of Lucky Dog Ltd, a member of the Chrysalis Group. He co-devised and produced the adult comedy series A Many Splintered Thing starring Alan Davies for BBC1.

=== Granada (1997–2001) ===
In March 1999, he re-joined Granada Television to continue his creative collaboration with Caroline Aherne. Allen produced two series and two Christmas specials of the multi-award-winning The Royle Family as well as Harry Enfield's Sermon from St Albion's for ITV and an award-winning documentary Back Passage To India for BBC1, which involved dragging Caroline Aherne and Craig Cash unwillingly around remote Indian villages for three weeks.

=== Shine (2001–2003) ===
In January 2001, he was approached by Elisabeth Murdoch to become the founding creative director of the independent production company Shine. Allen was a key member of the launch team that secured the initial start-up financing. He quickly established the core creative divisions and overall creative strategy for the start-up company and recruited the core business affairs, finance, and creative personnel. He also established a talent incubator for comedy film directors in partnership with the UK Film Council and Film4.

=== BBC Television (2003–2008) ===
Allen was BBC's Creative Head of Comedy Talent and Comedy North. He joined the BBC as its comedy editor in February 2003, and was responsible for developing and producing all forms of comedy for the four main BBC broadcast networks and running the in-house production teams. He immediately established a department based in Manchester called Comedy North. He produced and executive-produced a diverse range of comedy programming including the BAFTA-winning sketch show That Mitchell and Webb Look (BBC Two), the BAFTA-nominated drama series Funland (BBC Three), The Omid Djalili Show (BBC One), After You've Gone (BBC One), Freezing (BBC Two), The Visit (BBC One and BBC Three), Massive (BBC Three) and four series of Ideal (BBC Two and BBC Three).

=== Big Talk Studios (2008–present) ===
Allen became CEO of Big Talk Studios in 2008. There he has produced two six-part comedies which were broadcast to record audiences and huge critical acclaim. The BAFTA-winning Rev. created by James Wood and Tom Hollander for BBC2 scooped four titles at the Broadcasting Press Guild Awards and was nominated at the BAFTAs for Best Situation Comedy. Him & Her, the most successful sitcom launch in the history of BBC3, written by Stefan Golaszewski and starring Russell Tovey and Sarah Solemani, picked up Best Comedy Performance for the two stars at the Royal Television Society Awards. Having acknowledged the loyal audience of Him & Her during its first and second series, a third series was commissioned.

Upcoming is a second series for Threesome (Comedy Central), a sitcom by Tom MacRae, starring Amy Huberman, Emun Elliott and Stephen Wight, and Friday Night Dinner (Channel 4), written and produced by Robert Popper and starring Tamsin Greig, Paul Ritter, Simon Bird and Tom Rosenthal. Both are currently in post-production.

Following their successful pilots, Chickens (Sky 1), written by and starring Simon Bird, Joe Thomas and Jonny Sweet, and The Job Lot, a series for ITV written by Claire Downes, Ian Jarvis and Stuart Lane, are both underway for a full series.

Currently shooting is the third series of Him & Her and Big Talk's first three-part contemporary drama The Town (ITV), written by Laurence Olivier award-winning playwright Mike Bartlett. In addition, miniseries A Young Doctor's Notebook, which Big Talk is producing for Sky Arts, and stars Jon Hamm and Daniel Radcliffe, has just finished shooting.

Allen is the Advisory Chair of the 2012 Media Guardian Edinburgh International Television Festival.

== Film ==
In 2005, he was nominated for his third BAFTA for producing the film Six Shooter, written and directed by Olivier award-winning playwright Martin McDonagh. The film won an Oscar at the 2006 Academy Awards.

== Personal life ==
He is married to the writer and author Imogen Edwards-Jones. They have two children, Allegra and Rafe. The difficult conception of Allegra was written about by Edwards-Jones in a recurring Daily Telegraph column that were subsequently collected into a book called The Stork Club.

== Awards and recognition ==
| Year | Award | Work | Category | Result |
|---|---|---|---|---|
| 1998 | British Comedy Awards | The Royle Family | Best New TV Comedy | Won |
| 1999 | BAFTA TV Award | The Royle Family | Best Comedy (Programme or Series) | Nominated |
| 1999 | British Comedy Awards | The Royle Family | Best TV Sitcom | Won |
| 1999 | RTS Television Award | The Royle Family | Best Situation Comedy/Comedy Drama | Nominated |
| 2000 | BAFTA TV Award | The Royle Family | Situation Comedy Award | Won |
| 2000 | National Television Award | The Royle Family | Most Popular Comedy Programme | Won |
| 2000 | RTS Television Award | The Royle Family | Best Situation Comedy/Comedy Drama | Nominated |
| 2000 | BAFTA TV Award | The Royle Family | Situation Comedy Award | Won |
| 2000 | British Comedy Awards | The Royle Family | Best TV Comedy | Won |
| 2000 | TV Quick Award | The Royle Family | Best Comedy Show | Won |
| 2001 | BAFTA TV Award | The Royle Family | Situation Comedy Award | Nominated |
| 2005 | BAFTA Film Award | Six Shooter | Best Short Film | Nominated |
| 2005 | British Independent Film Awards | Six Shooter | Best British Short | Won |
| 2006 | BAFTA TV Award | Funland | Best Drama Serial | Nominated |
| 2006 | Academy Award | Six Shooter | Best Short Film, Live Action | Won |
| 2006 | Leuven International Short Film Festival | Six Shooter | Audience Award | Won |
| 2011 | Banff Rockie Award | Rev. | Best Sitcom | Nominated |
| 2011 | Broadcasting Press Guild Award | Rev. | Best Comedy/Entertainment | Nominated |
| 2011 | BAFTA TV Award | Rev. | Best Situation Comedy | Won |
| 2011 | Southbank Sky Arts Award | Rev. | Comedy Award | Won |
| 2012 | BAFTA TV Award | Friday Night Dinner | Best Situation Comedy | Nominated |
| 2012 | Rose d'Or | Friday Night Dinner | Best Sitcom | Won |
| 2013 | Satellite Awards | A Young Doctor's Notebook | Best Television Series | Nominated |
| 2014 | Broadcast Awards | A Young Doctor's Notebook | Best Multichannel Programme | Won |
| 2014 | BAFTA TV Award | Him & Her: The Wedding | Best Situation Comedy | Won |
| 2016 | Rose d'Or | Mum | Best Sitcom | Nominated |
| 2016 | Rose d'Or | Raised by Wolves | Best Sitcom | Won |
| 2017 | C21 International Drama Awards | Back | Best Comedy Drama | Nominated |
| 2017 | Broadcast Awards | Cold Feet | Best Drama Series or Serial | Nominated |
| 2017 | National Television Award | Cold Feet | Best Drama | Nominated |
| 2017 | Mind Media Award | Cold Feet | Best Drama Series | Won |
| 2017 | Broadcast Awards | Mum | Best Comedy Programme | Won |
| 2017 | Broadcasting Press Guild Awards | Mum | Best Comedy | Won |
| 2018 | British Comedy Guide Awards | Back | Best New TV Sitcom | Won |
| 2018 | BAFTA TV Award | Timewasters | Best Scripted Comedy | Nominated |
| 2018 | RTS North West Award | Cold Feet | Best Drama | Won |
| 2018 | British Comedy Guide Awards | Friday Night Dinner | Best Returning TV Sitcom | Won |
| 2019 | Broadcast Awards | Mum | Best Comedy Programme | Nominated |
| 2019 | BAFTA TV Award | Mum | Best Scripted Comedy | Nominated |
| 2020 | Edinburgh TV Awards | Defending the Guilty | Best Comedy Series | Nominated |
| 2022 | RTS NW Award | Peacock | Best Comedy Programme | Nominated |
| 2022 | RTS West Award | The Outlaws | Best Scripted Programme | Won |
| 2022 | Rose d'Or | The Outlaws | Best Comedy Drama and Sitcom | Nominated |
| 2022 | C21 International Drama Awards | The Outlaws | Best Comedy Drama Series | Nominated |
| 2023 | RTS West Award | The Outlaws | Best Scripted Programme | Won |

== Credits ==
| Year | Production | Role | Notes |
|---|---|---|---|
| 1990 | Tonight with Jonathan Ross | Producer | TV series |
| 1991 | Band Explosion | Executive Producer | TV series |
| 1993 | Saturday Zoo | Producer | TV series |
| 1994 | The Mrs Merton Show | Producer | TV series |
| 1998 | Comedy Lab | Executive Producer | TV series |
| 1998 | A Many Splintered Thing | Producer | TV short |
| 1998 | Babes in the Wood | Producer | TV series |
| 1999 | Sermon from St Albion's | Producer | TV series |
| 2000 | A Many Splintered Thing | Producer | TV series |
| 1999–2000 | The Royle Family | Producer | TV series |
| 2002 | Post | Producer | Short |
| 2003 | Watch with Monkey | Executive Producer | TV series |
| 2003 | Hello, Friend | Producer | Short |
| 2003 | The Crouches | Executive Producer | TV series |
| 2004 | Six Shooter | Producer | Short |
| 2004 | My Life in Film | Executive Producer | TV series |
| 2005 | According to Bex | Executive Producer | TV series |
| 2005 | 10:96:Training Night | Executive Producer | TV |
| 2005 | Funland | Executive Producer | TV series |
| 2005 | Harold the Amazing Contortionist Pig | Producer | Short |
| 2005–2008 | Ideal | Executive Producer | TV series |
| 2006 | The Truth | Associate Producer | Feature |
| 2006 | I'm With Stupid | Executive Producer | TV series |
| 2006–2008 | That Mitchell and Webb Look | Executive Producer | TV series |
| 2007 | I'm With Stupid | Executive Producer | TV |
| 2007 | Scallywagga | Executive Producer | TV series |
| 2007 | Sound | Executive Producer | TV |
| 2007 | The Visit | Executive Producer | TV series |
| 2007 | Where Have I Been All Your Life? | Executive Producer | Short |
| 2007 | The Omid Djalili Show | Executive Producer | TV series |
| 2007–2008 | Freezing | Producer | TV series |
| 2007–2008 | After You've Gone | Executive Producer | TV series |
| 2008 | Placebo | Executive Producer | TV |
| 2008 | Massive | Executive Producer | TV series |
| 2008–2009 | Parents of the Band | Executive Producer | TV series |
| 2010–2011 | Him & Her | Producer | TV series |
| 2010–2011 | Rev. | Producer (2010), EP (2011) | TV series |
| 2011-2020 | Friday Night Dinner | Executive Producer | TV series |
| 2011 | King Of... | Executive Producer | TV series |
| 2011 | Show Me The Funny | Executive Producer | TV series |
| 2011 | Chickens | Executive Producer | TV series |
| 2011 | Free Agents U.S. | Executive Producer | TV series |
| 2011 | Threesome | Executive Producer | TV series |
| 2012-2013 | A Young Doctor's Notebook | Executive Producer | TV series |
| 2013 | Ambassadors | Executive Producer | TV series |
| 2013-2016 | Raised by Wolves | Executive Producer | TV series |
| 2014 | Our Zoo | Executive Producer | TV series |
| 2016 | Crashing | Executive Producer | TV series |
| 2016 | Houdini and Doyle | Executive Producer | TV series |
| 2016-2019 | Mum | Executive Producer | TV series |
| 2017-2021 | Back | Executive Producer | TV series |
| 2017-2019 | Timewasters | Executive Producer | TV series |
| 2018-2019 | Defending the Guilty | Executive Producer | TV series |
| 2019-2020 | The Goes Wrong Show | Executive Producer | TV series |
| 2021- | The Outlaws | Executive Producer | TV series |
| 2022- | Peacock | Executive Producer | TV series |
| 2024- | The Completely Made-Up Adventures of Dick Turpin | Executive Producer | TV series |
| 2024- | Ludwig | Executive Producer | TV series |

== See also ==
- List of Academy Award winners and nominees from Great Britain
