= Coppelia (2021 film) =

2021 film by Jeff Tudor, Steven de Beul, and Ben Tesseur

- Directed by: Jeff Tudor; Steven De Beul; Ben Tesseur
- Written by: Jeff Tudor; Steven De Beul; Ben Tesseur
- Based on: "The Sandman" by E. T. A. Hoffmann
- Produced by: Submarine Amsterdam; 3 Minutes West
- Starring: Michaela DePrince; Daniel Camargo; Vito Mazzeo
- Music by: Maurizio Malagnini
- Distributed by: Urban Distribution International
- Release dates: June 2021 (Annecy); July 2022
- Running time: 82 minutes
- Countries: Germany, Belgium, Netherlands
- Language: film without dialogue

Coppelia is a 2021 film without dialogue that combines live action dance with animation. It stars Michaela DePrince in the leading role.

The film was conceived by director Jeff Tudor. Tudor co-wrote and co-directed with Steven de Beul and Ben Tesseur.

The plot is inspired by a 2008 version of the ballet Coppelia, which in turn was loosely based on The Sandman by E.T.A. Hoffmann. The music is by Maurizio Malagnini with choreography by Ted Brandsen, director of the Dutch National Ballet.

== Plot ==
The plot deals with issues such as the pressures of social media, the lure of superficial beauty and the importance of being yourself.

The story is set in the modern era in a quaint European town with a large, central town square. Swan is a young woman who lives in town with her mother and operates a juice stand in the square. Franz is her boyfriend who operates a nearby bicycle shop. One day, Doctor Coppelius, a cosmetic surgeon and malicious scientist, arrives in town to set up business by erecting a large, modern-looking beauty clinic in the town square. The clinic is staffed by robotic female assistants. Doctor Coppelius presents Coppelia, his muse, who appears to be a glamorous model and an example of his work as a cosmetic surgeon. Coppelia is actually a sophisticated robot, created by the Doctor. Advertising via posters and television, Coppelius entices many of the townspeople - including the Mayor, Baker, Hairdresser and even Swan's Mother - into the laboratory in order to give customers a new look. In the process, he steals their strongest character traits, harvesting the essence of their personalities in containers and using this essence to attempt to bring his muse, Coppelia, to life. After their beauty 'treatments', the doctor's victims enter a trance-like state and become obsessed with admiring their new looks in mirrors. However, their actual appearance has not changed; only their reflection looks better. The robot Coppelia drugs Franz with a perfume spray. After Swan sees Franz being led into the laboratory, she organizes a rescue with her friends. Coppelius has his robot attendants strap Frans into a sinister heart machine, with a helmet placed over his head. The helmet draws out the love from Franz's heart and transfers it to Coppelia, who wears a similar helmet. During the process, the robot Coppelia momentarily becomes human, much to the Doctor's delight. However, Swan had already invaded the laboratory. The power of Swan and Franz's true love overloads the heart machine and Coppelia short circuits. Swan manages to free Franz and triggers the collapse of the laboratory. During the collapse, the 'essence' the Doctor has harvested from the townspeople is released into the atmosphere. Swan opens a hatch in the clinic roof to allow the essence to escape. The essence returns to the townspeople, reversing the trance-like state the townspeople were trapped in. Coppelius flees town, and the town returns to normal. Swan, Franz and their friends celebrate.

== Cast ==
- Michaela DePrince as Swan
- Daniel Camargo as Franz
- Vito Mazzeo as Doctor Coppelius
- Glynis Terborg as Swan's mother
- Erica Horwood as Coppelia
- Igone de Jongh as ballet teacher
- Irek Mukhamedov as baker
- Darcey Bussell as mayor
- Jan Kooijman as hairdresser
- Frans Schraven as art shop owner
- Rachel Beaujean as art shop owner's friend
- Nancy Burer as Swan's Friend
- Sasha Mukhamedov as Swan's Friend

== Production ==
Director Jeff Tudor developed the idea for the film, inspired by a 2008 production by Dutch National Ballet, where dancers DePrince, Camargo, de Jongh and Beaujean all formerly performed. Tudor teamed up with co-directors Steven de Beul and Ben Tesseur to write the screenplay. The choreography is by Ted Brandsen, artistic director of the Dutch National Ballet and creator of the stage production. The music was written by Maurizio Malagnini, and performed by the BBC Concert Orchestra with Geoff Alexander as conductor.

Most of the animation was performed by MotionWorks in Halle (Saale). Live-action dancers were filmed in Amsterdam against green, blue or yellow screen backgrounds which MotionWorks replaced with painted backgrounds or CGI-sets. Animated characters were added to scenes opposite live performers, who interacted with actors dressed in blue or green suits.

Filming started in July 2019. At the time of filming, DePrince was recovering from a ruptured Achilles tendon, and she was using her film performance as a step to recovery. DePrince has vitiligo, a condition that causes patches of skin to lose its pigment. In the film, her vitiligo is noticeable around her neck. In a review for Movie Music UK, Jonathan Broxton wrote that DePrince's vitiligo "fits in with Coppelia's underlying story about dangerously unrealistic and unattainable standards of beauty in modern society."

== Reception ==
The movie premiered at Annecy Festival 2021. It won the Golden Punt for Best Fiction Feature at the 40th Cambridge Film Festival. Awards for the film score include the IFMCA Film Score of the Year 2021, Movie Music International Best Score for a Fantasy Film 2021 and Movie Music UK Score of the Year 2021.

Nikki Baughan of Screen Daily: "Live action and CGI animation seamlessly combine in this modern retelling of the 150-year-old ballet. Young audiences should be particularly smitten with its Disney-esque charms...it's impossible not to be caught up in the beautiful fantasy of it all."

Leslie Felperin of The Guardian gave the film 3 out of 5 stars describing it as a "cleverly conceived modern update of Delibes' classic ballet."

Coppelia has a score of 83% on Rotten Tomatoes.
