= Stephen Wight =

English actor

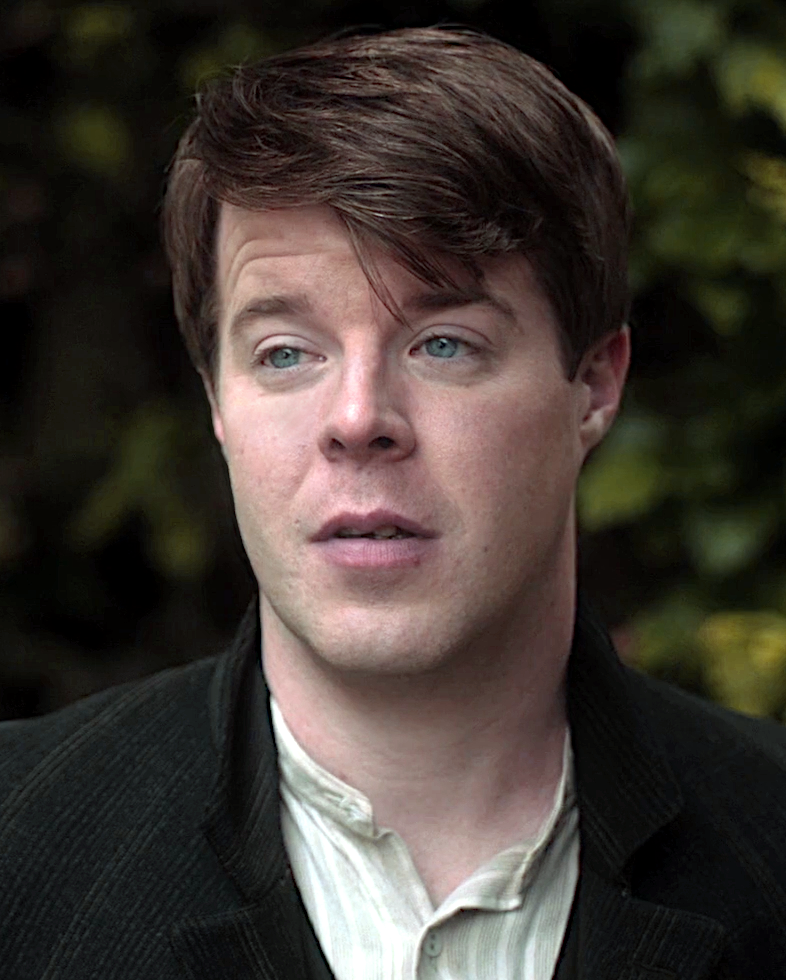
- Wight in The Paradise 2012
- Born: Stephen Gray; February 27, 1980 (age 46); Romford, Essex, England
- Education: Drama Centre London
- Occupation: Actor
- Years active: 2003–present

Stephen Wight (born Stephen Gray) is an English actor. He won the Milton Shulman Award for Outstanding Newcomer at the Evening Standard Theatre Awards for his performances in Don Juan in Soho (2007) at the Donmar Warehouse, He was nominated for a Laurence Olivier Award for his performance in Dealer's Choice (2007).

His TV and film credits include A Touch of Frost (2003), Diamond Geezer (2005), Misfits (2009), The Great Outdoors (2010), Whites (2010), Threesome (2011), The Paradise (2012), Sherlock (2012), Bluestone 42 (2013-2015), Lovesick (2014), Manhunt (2019), Silent Witness (2021), Andor (2022), Rain Dogs (2023) and Bergerac (2025).

== Early life and education ==
Stephen Wight was born Stephen Gray. He was raised and educated on the Isle of Wight, England. His devotion to the island led him to use the name of the island as his actor stage name.

He studied acting at Drama Centre London.

== Career ==
Wight's television career dates back to 2003, working alongside David Jason, in A Touch of Frost (2003), and again in Diamond Geezer (2005).

In 2007, Wight won the Milton Shulman Award for Outstanding Newcomer at the Evening Standard Theatre Awards for his performances in Don Juan in Soho at the Donmar Warehouse and in the revival of Patrick Marber's Dealer's Choice at the Menier Chocolate Factory in Southwark. He was nominated for a Laurence Olivier Award too.

In December 2009, Wight played Danny in Episode Four (Series One) of the E4 television series Misfits. In late 2010 he starred as a series regular in two BBC sitcoms, playing Joe in The Great Outdoors, then Skoose in the Alan Davies sitcom Whites.

From November 2011, Wight played Harry Robinson in the London West End production of The Ladykillers at the Gielgud theatre, alongside Ben Miller and Peter Capaldi. He was also in the 2011 sitcom Threesome as Mitch, one of the three main characters, and opposite Emun Elliott, with whom he also co-starred in the 2012 drama series The Paradise. He appeared in episode two of series two of the BBC TV drama Sherlock, "The Hounds of Baskerville". He played Lance Corporal Simon Lansley in three series of the BBC Three comedy Bluestone 42, between 2013 and 2015. In 2014, he appeared in the Channel 4 sitcom Lovesick.

In 2015, Wight originated the title role in the play McQueen at the St. James Theatre, London.

In 2019, he played the main role of Detective Constable Clive Grace in Manhunt, alongside Martin Clunes. In 2021, he played DS Steve Galloway in four episodes of Silent Witness. In 2022, he appeared as Verlo in Andor. In 2023, he played Brett in Rain Dogs. In 2022 and 2024, he appeared as Gary Campbell in Channel 4's Screw. The show was cancelled after its second series.

In 2026, he is to appear in Helen Edmundson's new play, Some Woman at the National Theatre.

== Filmography ==
Year	Title	Role	Notes
2003	Casualty	Karl Austen	S17 E34
2003	A Touch of Frost	Ritchie Mason	
2003	The Straits	Jock	Paines Plough company, Edinburgh Festival Fringe 2003 and Hampstead Theatre, November 2003
2004	Hex	Felix	
2004	Sing Yer Heart Out for the Lads	Jason	National Theatre Company at the Cottesloe, April 2004
2005	Fingersmith	Charles	4 Episodes
2005, 2007	Diamond Geezer	Phil Perkins	2 Episodes
2006	Wilderness	Steve	
2006	Skyvers		Royal Court Theatre rehearsed reading, 23 January 2006
2006	Don Juan in Soho	Stan	Donmar Warehouse, December 2006
2007	Dealer's Choice	Mugsy	Menier Chocolate Factory, October 2007; then Trafalgar Studios, December 2007
2008	Coming of Age	Horace	Season 2, Episode 3
2009	The Habit of Art	Stuart	National Theatre, 2009
2009	Misfits	Danny	Series 1, Episode 4
2010	The Great Outdoors	Joe	
2010	Whites	Skoose	
2011	The Ladykillers	Harry Robinson	Gielgud Theatre, November 2011
2011	Threesome	Mitch	
2012	Sherlock	Fletcher	Series two, episode two: "The Hounds of Baskerville"
2012	The Paradise		
2013	Thor: The Dark World	Extra	Man on the train wearing headphones
2013	The Escape Artist	Danny Monk	
2013–2015	Bluestone 42	Lance Corporal Simon "Skip" Lansley	
2014, 2016	Lovesick	Jonno	
2015	McQueen	Alexander McQueen	St. James Theatre, London.
2016	The Mysteries of Udolpho	Ludovico (voice)	Adaptation by Hattie Naylor
2019	Manhunt	DC Clive Grace	
2019	Men in Black: International	Guy	
2020	I May Destroy You	Ben	
2021	Silent Witness	DS Steve Galloway	4 episodes, Season 24
2022	Screw	Gary Campbell	12 episodes, Season 1 and 2
2022	Mad House	Nedward	Ambassadors Theatre
2022	Andor	Verlo	Series one, Episode one: "Kassa"
2023	Rain Dogs	Brett	
2024	The Bay	Craig Ashworth	Series 5
2025	Bergerac	John Blakely	Series 1
2026	Waiting for the Out	Lee Gifford	6 episodes
