= Free Agents =

British television series

- Opening credits title
- Genre: Comedy
- Created by: Chris Niel
- Written by: Chris Niel
- Directed by: James Griffiths
- Starring: 1. REDIRECT Template:Plainlist
- Composer: David Arnold
- Country of origin: United Kingdom
- Original language: English
- No. of series: 1
- No. of episodes: 6

Production
- Producer: 1. REDIRECT Template:Plainlist
- Cinematography: Ben Seresin
- Editor: Chris Dickens
- Running time: 22 minutes
- Production company: 1. REDIRECT Template:Plainlist

Original release
- Network: Channel 4
- Release: 13 February – 20 March 2009

Related
- Free Agents (American remake)

Free Agents is a romantic black comedy starring Stephen Mangan, Sharon Horgan and Anthony Head. Originally a pilot for Channel 4 in November 2007, the series began on 13 February 2009. It spawned a short lived American remake, which was cancelled after just 4 episodes aired, although 4 more were later released on Hulu.

== Plot ==
Alex Taylor (Mangan) works for CMA, a successful talent agency. Whilst he is grateful for his job, he is currently going through a messy divorce, causing him to become depressed. His boss however, Stephen Cauldwell (Head), is sex-obsessed, cocksure and roguish. Alex later meets Helen Ryan (Horgan), a co-worker who is more successful and herself recovering from a messy relationship, after her boyfriend died months before her wedding.

== Production ==
The series is produced by Big Talk Productions and Bwark Productions and is written by Chris Niel. It was formed as part of Channel 4's 2007 Comedy Showcase along with Plus One and The Kevin Bishop Show, both of which were given their own series. The show was originally entitled Bitter and Twisted. The series started on 13 February and ended on 20 March. Shortly before the final episode aired, Mangan told a reporter that he and the rest of the cast were hoping to make a second series.

== Episodes ==
No.	Title	Original release date	Viewers (millions)
1	"Episode 1"	13 February 2009	1.300 (+1: 0.118) (Overnights)
It's the morning after the night before, and colleagues Alex and Helen must cope with the aftermath of their drunken one-night stand. This makes for an interesting day at CMA, the PR firm where the staff are hardly fit to look after their own interests, let alone anyone else's. And this is as true of the charismatic yet sleazy boss, Stephen, as it is of any of his employees. Alex doggedly stalks Helen around town, trying to get her to be his girlfriend (and give him a place to stay that isn't the office sofa), but she is just not having it. Not, that is, until she's popped to the off licence and gulped down enough wine to cloud her judgement.
2	"Episode 2"	20 February 2009	1.100 (+1: 0.101) (Overnights)
Although still suffering the emotional fall-out from his divorce, Alex is convinced that Helen is perfect for him. Helen thinks quite the opposite. Yes, she's slept with him once; okay, so it was twice, but there's no way she's going to do it again... As Valentine's day approaches, Helen posts Alex's details on a dating website. One night lodging with Stephen is all it takes for Alex to overcome his aversion to online dating, but when he logs in he finds a drunken video message from his ex-girlfriend, Sarah. Meanwhile, Helen tries to avoid Valentine's Day altogether by arranging a dinner with her elderly accountant, but he sends his very good-looking (and gay) deputy, Raz (Navin Chowdhry), in his place. Also, Stephen has fallen in love, and asks Helen's advice on how he can give up his lecherous ways.
3	"Episode 3"	27 February 2009	Unknown
Alex is still homeless. After Helen finds him sleeping in his car, the day gets even worse when the boss tells them his old friend and rival agent Charlie Renfrew has died. This wouldn't be so bad, but Stephen wants them to attend Renfrew's funeral to show their respect, and - more importantly - steal his clients. Plagued by memories of her fiancé Pete's funeral, Helen heads for the nearest off-licence. That evening, Helen is shocked when Pete's control-freak of a sister Sophie asks her to be godmother to her baby daughter. At Renfrew's funeral, Alex accidentally antagonises a successful young actor, leaving Helen - who is still drunk - to get a little too deep into a debate with the vicar about the ethics of being a godmother when you don't believe in God.
4	"Episode 4"	6 March 2009	Unknown
Helen asks Alex to help babysit her goddaughter with her, and he unexpectedly agrees, suggesting they all go to the park. Alex's children have accidentally revealed that their mum has a new boyfriend, and Alex thinks they'll be at the same park. But when his plan to spy on his kids' new stepfather is rumbled, Alex takes charge of baby Peta, and Helen sees a new side to Alex - the responsible grown-up. The day of parental pretense is interrupted by a summons from Stephen to an emergency board meeting, which turns out to be a party he's arranged because he's feeling lonely. But Alex's life does take a turn for the better when Helen asks him to move into her spare room. And a turn for the worse when he takes his kids to the zoo and they ask him why their friend's mum saw him hiding behind a tree spying on them with his girlfriend and baby...
5	"Episode 5"	13 March 2009	Unknown
Alex arranges a surprise party for Helen's birthday. Or rather, Sophie, Helen's dead fiancé's control-freak sister, arranges it. To keep Helen busy while all is prepared, Alex fixes her up to go for a work drink with Doctor Two-Scenes - a client who consistently gets two scenes in Holby City but is unable to find any other work. However, best laid plans start to fall apart when Sophie punches Alex in the face and a drunk Helen seems willing to help the Doctor add a sex scene to his repertoire.
6	"Episode 6"	20 March 2009	0.700 (+1: 0.067) (Overnights)
Alex is sulking about Helen having sex with Doctor Two-Scenes. Following a drunken argument, Helen storms off to Colchester to have more sex with the Doctor, while Stephen drags Alex to an up-market brothel where he introduces Alex to the glamorous madam, Wendy who Stephen is going to marry on Saturday. Stephen chooses Alex as his best man. Helen doesn't go to Colchester, but instead goes to Ruislip Crematorium to try to visit Pete's headstone at 3 am. With her drinking and life out of control, she decides to sell her flat and leave CMA, and goes for an interview to train as a therapist. Meanwhile, Alex bumps into Sarah Stephens, who he's been avoiding. When Helen realises that she just needs to be in therapy, she decides not to leave CMA, and that she doesn't want Alex to move out of her flat. But Alex interrupts her: he has already arranged to move into Sarah Stephens' spare room. Alex and Helen's relationship issues finally come to a head at Stephen's wedding.

== Reception ==
The pilot attracted positive reviews. David Chater in The Times said, "There is a good deal of snappy banter between the two (Mangan and Horgan), but Anthony Head as their boss steals the show as a pervy old goat out of whose mouth pours an unending stream of uncensored filth. It’s like being confronted by an erection on screen – more amazing than shocking."

Gareth McLean in The Guardian said, "There's little funnier than other people's emotional damage and the consequent mess they make of things, so Chris Niel's tale of two colleagues - he an estranged dad, she lately availed of a dead fiance - who have casual sex and have to deal with the aftermath is very funny indeed."

When the series was first broadcast, the Sunday Express attacked the show because of bad language, claiming that the word "cunt" was used three times and "fuck" 22 times. John Beyer from Mediawatch said, "The obscene language in this programme is appalling by any standard. It shows a disregard of public concern that is completely unacceptable from a public service broadcaster."

== International broadcasts ==
Country	TV Network(s)	Date of Premiere
Germany	ZDFneo	7 January 2010
Netherlands	Comedy Central	25 July 2010
United States	BBC America	8 October 2011
New Zealand	TVNZ Ondemand	29 November 2015
Australia	ABC Comedy	2 April 2018
