= Diamond Geezer =

British television crime drama series (2005–2007)

- Genre: Crime drama
- Created by: Caleb Ranson
- Starring: David Jason; Gary Whelan; Stephen Wight
- Theme music composer: Ray Russell
- Composer: Ray Russell
- Country of origin: United Kingdom
- Original language: English
- No. of series: 1
- No. of episodes: 4 (list of episodes)

Production
- Executive producers: David Jason; David Reynolds
- Producer: Menzies Kennedy
- Running time: 90 mins. (including advertisements)
- Production company: ITV Productions

Original release
- Network: ITV
- Release: 20 March 2005 – 23 April 2007

Diamond Geezer is a British television crime drama, broadcast on ITV between 20 March 2005 and 23 April 2007. Created by Caleb Ranson, the series stars David Jason as jewel thief and professional con man Des. One series of the programme was broadcast. A second series was not commissioned due to falling viewing figures, and Jason filming the first full series of A Touch of Frost since 2002.

== Background ==
Initially broadcast as a one-off special, Diamond Geezer was commissioned for a full series of three episodes following strong viewing figures and critical acclaim. The first episode sees Des (David Jason), a long-serving prison inmate, trying to persuade a first time offender to join forces with him in his new big scam. The pilot episode was broadcast on 20 March 2005 to an audience of nearly 10 million viewers.

The three-part second series began broadcast on 9 April 2007, but did not live up to expectation, with the final episode barely scraping 4 million viewers, down from 6.2 million viewers for the first episode before finally ceasing operations for good on 23 April 2007. All four episodes were later broadcast in the United States under the title Rough Diamond.

== Cast ==
- David Jason as Des
- Gary Whelan as Benny
- Stephen Wight as Phil Perkins

=== Recurring cast ===
- Jenny Agutter as Vanessa
- Paul Bown as Guv'nor
- Don Warrington as Hector
- George Cole as Gerald
- Carli Norris as Betsy
- Ieuan Rhys as Jenx
- Mary Tamm as Maureen
- David Troughton as D.I. Critchley
- Roy Marsden as Garovski
- Rupert Holliday-Evans as Poliarkov
- Christopher Fairbank as Barry
- Paul Freeman as Sergey

== Episodes ==
=== Series overview ===
| Series | Episodes | Originally released | |
| Series | Episodes | First released | Last released |
|---|---|---|---|
| Pilot | | 20 March 2005 | |
| 1 | 3 | 9 April 2007 | 23 April 2007 |

=== Pilot (2005) ===
| No. overall | Title | Directed by | Written by | Original release date | CAN viewers (millions) |
|---|---|---|---|---|---|
| 1 | "Diamond Geezer" | Paul Harrison | Caleb Ransom | 20 March 2005 | 9.94 |
Trusted by inmates and prison guards alike, Des is a simple, stammering soul who wouldn’t hurt a fly. He comes across as a frail old man who is honest and open. This gains the respect of most of the inmates and prison guards alike. Little do they know, Des has a spring in his step and twinkle in his eye that’s worth millions. He’s a master of disguise and being in prison is all part of his ingenious plan - Des needs the perfect alibi for the perfect crime - which is to steal valuable diamonds from fellow inmate and notorious bully Benny. He takes petty theft criminal Phil under his wing to hatch the devious and dangerous plan.

=== Series 1 (2007) ===
| No. overall | Title | Directed by | Written by | Original release date | CAN viewers (millions) |
|---|---|---|---|---|---|
| 1 | "A Royal Affair" | Paul Harrison | Caleb Ranson | 9 April 2007 | 6.23 |
Des is in Nicé overseeing work on his luxurious new villa, under the alias of Major John Robbie, but the smile quickly disappears from Des's face when he and his son Phil are arrested on suspicion of murdering Benny Fellows – a victim from a previous heist. DI Critchley offers the pair a deal, saying charges against them will be dropped if they return to London and pull off the robbery of a lifetime – breaking into Buckingham Palace and stealing the Star of India before it is returned to the Indian Prime Minister, unaware that it is not the real diamond. Des and Phil only have seven days to plan and execute the near impossible raid. Will this be one job too many, even for the master criminal?
| 2 | "Old Gold" | Paul Harrison | Guy Burt | 16 April 2007 | 4.88 |
Kate, an attractive former British intelligence agent, approaches Des with a proposition. The KGB stashed gold bullion in London during the Cold War – but its whereabouts were lost when a coded message vanished. However, Kate has learned that the code is hidden in a painting hanging in the Russian Embassy – and she asks Des to steal it. Des, Kate and her Russian contact Sergei set about devising a plan to recover the painting, but it isn't long before both British and Russian agents are on their tail. And it seems as though Kate and Sergei are not all that they seem. Will Des manage to get away before the heat comes down? And will his wrongdoings finally catch up with him?
| 3 | "Old School Lies" | Simon Langton | Nick Fisher | 23 April 2007 | 4.26 |
Des attends a wake to pay his respects to old pal Bobby and meets up with Barry, Bobby's brother and Violet, his mum. Violet is heartbroken by the death of her son, as Bobby was the only good boy in her family. However, it was a heart attack that eventually killed Bobby, which Violet believes was the result of stressing over some missing money. As Violet sits crying, Barry takes Des for a walk by the river and talks about Bobby. It was stress that killed Bobby, after thirty years of pension contributions his company went into liquidation and Bobby's pension fund disappeared. Barry believes that City Financial firm Leyfield-Clark stole Bobby's pension fund and he asks Des to steal it back. Des offers to do anything to ease the pain, and Barry makes it clear that this is the only money his mum will accept as help. Will Des be able to follow the paper trail and steal Bobby's pension fund for Violet?
