= Maurizio Malagnini =

Italian composer

Maurizio Malagnini is a British, Italian born composer who lives in Los Angeles.

== Career ==
Maurizio Malagnini is a composer based in Los Angeles, who earned a master's degree with honors from the Royal College of Music in 2008, London, after 10 years of academic studies in Italian conservatoire.

Since then, Malagnini has composed the music for many episodes of television for BBC One. In 2015 his score to The Paradise has been recognized with an Emmy nomination, and has been hailed as a "masterpiece of musical storytelling." Broadcast in 132 territories, The Paradise earned Malagnini international recognition, including three Music + Sound Awards. Afterwards, he composed the music from the fourth season of the acclaimed period drama Call the Midwife.

His other projects include the ITV Movie Peter & Wendy and The C Word, a BBC TV-movie based on the book and blog by Lisa Lynch, and Coppelia, an animation and live action film for which he was awarded 2 IFMCA Awards, including the prestigious Film Score of the Year from the International Film Critics Association.

Malagnini is currently composing the music for a new BBC show.

=== Works for film & television ===
Year	Title	Episode(s)	Notes
2010	Muddle Earth	26 episodes	CBBC TV Series
2011	The Body Farm	6 episodes	BBC TV Series
2012–2013	The Paradise	16 episodes	BBC TV Series
2015-2026	Call the Midwife	104 episodes	BBC TV Series
2015	The C Word		TV movie
2015	Peter & Wendy		TV movie
2021	Coppelia		Movie
2026	Lost in Memory		Movie

== Awards ==
Primetime Emmy Awards

- 2015: The Paradise Outstanding Original Music in a Series (nomination)

The Music + Sound Awards, International

- 2015: Call the Midwife Best Original Composition Television Score
- 2014: The Paradise Best Original Composition Television Score
- 2013: The Paradise Best Original Composition Television Score

The Music + Sound Awards, UK

- 2014: The Paradise Best Original Composition Television Program Score

Televisual Bulldog Awards, UK

- 2015: The Paradise Best Music (nomination)

International Film Music Critics Association Awards

- 2021: Coppelia Film Score of the Year
