= Threesome (British TV series) =

British sitcom

- Genre: Sitcom
- Created by: Tom MacRae
- Written by: Tom MacRae; Tom Edge
- Directed by: Ian FitzGibbon
- Starring: Emun Elliott; Amy Huberman; Stephen Wight
- Opening theme: "Work It Out" by Esser
- Country of origin: United Kingdom
- Original language: English
- No. of series: 2
- No. of episodes: 14 (list of episodes)

Production
- Executive producers: Kenton Allen; Simon Curtis
- Producers: John Rushton; Luke Alkin; Sam Ward
- Editor: Paul Machliss
- Running time: 25 minutes approx
- Production company: Big Talk Productions

Original release
- Network: Comedy Central
- Release: 17 October 2011 – 12 November 2012

Threesome (stylised as threesome) is a British television sitcom written by Tom MacRae and starring Stephen Wight, Amy Huberman and Emun Elliott. The series is focused around three friends—Alice, Mitch and Richie—who return home from a night out celebrating Alice's birthday and end up having a threesome, which results in Alice getting pregnant. Instead of getting an abortion, the three friends decide to raise the baby as a trio. The series began airing on 17 October 2011 on Comedy Central and Comedy Central HD. It is the first original scripted comedy commissioned by Comedy Central and is produced by Big Talk Productions.

In February 2012, it was confirmed that Comedy Central had renewed the show for a second series. Although this included the possibility of a 22-episode third series, this did not happen.

The show was remade in Finland in 2017, as Kolmistaan.

== Premise ==
Threesome is a sitcom about three inseparable friends on the verge of turning 30. Alice (Amy Huberman) lives with her boyfriend Mitch (Stephen Wight) and their gay best friend Richie (Emun Elliott). Together they form three points of an unlikely triangle, living, laughing and larging it together. After a big birthday party for Alice, they end up having an unplanned threesome during which Alice becomes pregnant. After discovering that he is infertile, Mitch tells Richie that he is the baby's biological father. They then decide to ditch the party lifestyle, have the baby, and raise her as a coparenting threesome.

== Characters and cast ==
=== Main characters ===
- Alice Heston (Amy Huberman) is the female lead. Alice's long-term friendship with Richie leads to her relationship with boyfriend Mitch.
- Mitch Ennis (Stephen Wight) meets Richie at his brother's funeral, and the two become friends. A blind date leads to Mitch and Alice dating.
- Richie Valentine (Emun Elliott): Best friends with Alice (since university) and Mitch, but unable to commit despite an active love life.
- Lily Owen Valentine-Ennis: is the trio's baby whom Alice gives birth to in the last episode of the first series. She is to be one of the main cast in the second series. Her characteristics are currently unknown.

=== Supporting roles ===
- Lorraine Heston (Pauline McLynn): a self-created glamour-puss and a bit of a nightmare control freak. She loves her daughter Alice dearly, but that love more often than not expresses itself as a domineering cattiness. Lorraine is all about the tan and the chatter and loves a good party, but behind the champagne bubbles the claws are out. Lorraine is wealthy and lives in Tenerife most of the year, where she flirts with boys, tolerates Alice's father Malcolm, and drinks way, way too much.
- Sue Ennis (Paddy Navin): a woman who couldn't be more like her son Mitch, or any closer to him; two peas in a pod who still love each other's company. Sue is down to earth, unpretentious and incredibly caring – as well as charmingly sentimental and a bit of a motor-mouth. Of all the mums, she's the least demanding, and will probably end up being far and away the best babysitter.
- Jenny Rouse (Joanna Roth): Richie's mum couldn't be less like Sue to look at. Jenny models herself on Anna Wintour; immaculate fashions and flawless styling, and is a design icon in her own right. Well spoken and perfectly poised, Jenny is every inch a lady – but she's not above chatting up boys on Richie's behalf. Jenny is desperate for Richie to find someone special and give her a gorgeous son-in-law to coo over.
- Dave (Adam Garcia): Richie's boyfriend.

== Episodes ==
=== Series 1 (2011) ===
No.	Title	Directed by	Written by	Original release date
1	"Pregnant"	Catherine Morshead & Ian FitzGibbon	Tom MacRae	17 October 2011
Alice turns 30. The three have a drug-addled threesome. Alice gets pregnant. She and Mitch decide she should get an abortion. Mitch changes his mind and he and Richie race to stop Alice at the clinic. Guest appearance:Lu Corfield
2	"Flat-Pack"	Ian FitzGibbon	Tom MacRae	17 October 2011
Following the opening episode, the threesome now have to figure out how to explain their unusually triangular relationship to the world. And most crucially – to Alice's domineering and not entirely nice mother Lorraine (who is not fond of Mitch but adores Richie). But how to explain the threeway daddy-mummy-daddy set up? Meanwhile, Mitch and Richie (having all jointly sworn off drink and drugs in solidarity with Alice) stumble across a stash of drink and drugs. Will they be strong enough to resist temptation whilst also assembling all the new nursery flat-pack? Or is it just an immutable fact of life that flat-pack is far more easily assembled on drugs? Guest appearance:Pauline McLynn and Amanda Rawnsley
3	"Builder"	Ian FitzGibbon	Tom MacRae	24 October 2011
Alice, Mitch and Richie attend their first antenatal class. To everyone's surprise Alice and Richie are hopeless and Mitch is an amazing proto-father. Alice and Richie go into panic mode about their suitability as future parents, and so Mitch entrusts them with a robot baby from the antenatal class to practice on. All they have to do is feed it, rock it, change it – and not totally destroy it. Richie also meets – or rather pulls – a genuinely amazing man, Dave The Builder. Richie likes him, but only to a point – he's not grown-up enough to have a grown-up relationship. Can Mitch persuade Richie that maybe it's time to give love a chance? Guest appearance:Adam Garcia
4	"No Funds"	Ian FitzGibbon	Tom MacRae	31 October 2011
Mitch still hasn't got a job, and now his lack of funds is starting to become a problem. Alice needs reliable support more than anything right now – the full reality of what's about to pop out of her in six months time is starting to hit home, and with the impending 12 Week Scan they're actually going to get to see their baby for the first time. It's time for Mitch to step up to the plate. Unfortunately for Mitch, he spectacularly fails to do so. Which is when Ben turns up. Ben is tall, handsome, rich, charming, successful and Alice's ex from four and a half years ago. Back in the day, Alice dumped Ben then started dating Mitch, and when Mitch actually meets the man who he replaced his insecurity starts going into overload. Ben is everything a woman could want in a man – but surely when it comes down to it, Alice will always chose her Mitch? Guest appearance:Travis Oliver, James Puddephatt, Ian FitzGibbon and Santam Bhogal
5	"Boyfriends"	Ian FitzGibbon	Tom MacRae	7 November 2011
To Alice's amazement – Richie and Dave are now dating! Proper boyfriends and everything. With Richie's birthday approaching a day of fun, fun, fun is being planned. But when Dave reveals he has alternative plans for Richie, tensions arise between the friends as Alice and Mitch conspire to keep Richie to themselves. When plans backfire, Richie ends up leaving Alice and Mitch to spend the day with Dave, who unveils his own special birthday surprise. But that means Richie leaving Alice and Mitch on the night they've planned so hard for so long to make special. Who is Richie going to choose? Guest appearance:Adam Garcia and Emma Handy
6	"It's Not Cheating"	Ian FitzGibbon	Tom MacRae	14 November 2011
Alice, just a month from popping, has decided to throw a baby-shower, and so Lorraine (Alice's mum), Sue (Mitch's mum) and Jenny (Richie's mum) converge on the flat to deluge her with presents and attention. Alice in turn has taken to baking, not-swearing and dressing like a proper woman. Mitch and Richie are horrified. Mitch and Richie escape for the evening to a local bar, and run into Wendy; a ballsy, feisty, fabulous girl who reminds them very much of a pre-pregnancy Alice. Spending time with Wendy is wonderful, but it's like cheating on Alice. Mitch and Richie vow to call off the 'affair', but when Princess Lullaby Dreamtime – a nauseating baby shower gift – arrives in the flat, the combination of that, Alice and The Mothers are more than Mitch and Richie can bear. How long can they hold out before they're drawn back into Wendy's arms, and how will Alice react when the two women finally meet? Guest appearance:Pauline McLynn, Joanna Roth, Paddy Navin and Gemma Whelan
7	"Final Push Party"	Ian FitzGibbon	Tom MacRae	21 November 2011
The threesome prepares for Alice's 'Final Push Party' with some questionable costume choices from the boys... Guest appearance:Pauline McLynn, Joanna Roth, Paddy Navin, Linda John Pierre and Adam Levy

=== Series 2 (2012) ===
No.	Title	Directed by	Written by	Original release date
8	"Back to School"	Ian Fitzgibbon	Tom Edge	1 October 2012
Mitch decides it's time to get a career but first must re-sit his school exams. Can his "parents" Alice & Richie and his naively optimistic teacher keep him in-line? Guest appearance:Joe Thomas
9	"Vacuum"	Ian Fitzgibbon	Amy Shindler, Beth Chalmers & Tom MacRae	8 October 2012
It's Richie's first day back at work after paternity leave and his new PA Billy is a little idiotic, but he could be Richie's only hope in a domestic spat.
10	"Alice's Friend"	Ian Fitzgibbon	Tom Edge	15 October 2012
Mitch returns home to discover the living room has been transformed into a fortified castle. Alice may have a little too much time on her hands these days, so she begins looking for another mother to be her friend.
11	"Photograph"	Ian Fitzgibbon	Tom MacRae	22 October 2012
Alice, Mitch, and Richie include baby Lily in a game of charades... but not in the way you'd first imagine.
12	"Future"	Ian Fitzgibbon	Tom MacRae	29 October 2012
In an attempt to dispose of an evil fridge, Alice, Richie, and Mitch get trapped in a storage unit. Guest appearance:Pauline McLynn.
13	"Dad"	Ian Fitzgibbon	Tom MacRae	5 November 2012
Richie's estranged father, who doesn't know that Richie is gay, shows up at the same time as Richie's ex-boyfriend.
14	"I Don't"	Ian Fitzgibbon	Tom MacRae	12 November 2012
Alice and Mitch's wedding plans get complicated when they discover their joke Vegas wedding was real. In order to get married in their planned ceremony, they must first get a divorce. Guest appearance:Pauline McLynn.

== Reception ==
The series has received a mostly positive critical reaction. Actor Russell Tovey praised the series. Catriona Wightman, writing for Digital Spy, also praised the series, coming to the conclusion that "it's really rather good indeed." The British Comedy Guide said "after the double-bill opener, Threesome has made a fantastic start. The potentially quite unlikeable situation and characters have proved to be anything but, and some great set-piece lines and scenes really made us laugh out loud. We found it thoroughly enjoyable from start to finish, and can't wait for the rest of the series." Writing for The Daily Telegraph, Catherine Gee said "Threesome throws up some funny moments and there's plenty of good chemistry between its stars." In a slightly more negative-mixed-positive review, Lucy Mangan, writing for The Guardian, said "the jokes are weak but when it's not trying to be funny, Threesome is very funny." Writing a negative review, again for The Guardian, Martin Skegg said "presumably it's meant to be funny, but you'll be searching high and low for the jokes." David Crawford writing for the Radio Times gave a highly positive review, saying "starting from a preposterous premise, this rambunctious comedy manages to get hearty, and frequently filthy, laughs from its unlikely situation. The humour is suitably broad for the subject matter, but there are neat gags, and wonderful physical comedy." Liam Murphy, writing for On the Box, gave a mixed review, saying "this is a sitcom with potential and as long as it avoids the trappings of most comedy pregnancies (see season 8 of Friends) then I might just watch the rest of the series!"

In January 2013, the British Comedy Guide gave the show the Comedy.co.uk Editors' Award saying: "We congratulate production company Big Talk and Comedy Central for giving this unique series the chance to grow. It seems to have boosted the channel's confidence in ordering more original comedy".

== DVD and Blu-ray release ==
On 17 October 2011, BBC Worldwide, released the series to download on the iTunes Store. Then as of 12 November 2012, series 1 became available to purchase on DVD-Video through 2 Entertain.

On 1 October 2012, series 2 became available to download through iTunes. A release date of series 2 on DVD has yet to be confirmed by 2 Entertain.
