= Dealer's Choice (play) =

Play by Patrick Marber

- Dealer's Choice Play Cover
- Written by: Patrick Marber
- Characters: Carl; Sweeney; Ash; Frankie; Stephen; Mugsy (Tony)
- Original language: English
- Subject: Gambling and the consequences of it
- Setting: A small restaurant in London

Premiere
- Date premiered: February 1995
- Place premiered: Royal National Theatre

Dealer's Choice is a play by Patrick Marber first performed at the Royal National Theatre (Cottesloe) in London in February 1995 where it won both the 1995 Evening Standard Award for Best Comedy and the Writers' Guild Award for Best West End Play.

It is set in a restaurant in London in the mid-1990s. The action takes place over three acts. The third act centres on a game of poker.

The original cast included Nicholas Day, Nigel Lindsay, Phil Daniels, Tom Georgeson, David Bark-Jones and Ray Winstone.

== Acts 1 and 2 ==
Stephen owns a small restaurant which employs Sweeney (the cook), Mugsy and Frankie (waiters). A third waiter, Tony, is mentioned but never appears in the play. Every Sunday after closing, the staff and Stephen's son, Carl, play a poker game in the basement.

At the start of the play, we learn Mugsy is attempting to buy a public toilet in Mile End and convert it into a restaurant. Mugsy does not have the money – he lost £3,000 at poker to Stephen several weeks ago. Mugsy is hoping to convince Carl to get the money from his father, and plans to dump Carl once the restaurant is open.

Carl has his own problems. He has a severe gambling addiction, which he believes he has kept hidden from his father. He currently owes £4,000 to Ash, his poker mentor, who, in turn, owes £10,000 to other gamblers. In the second act, Ash comes to the restaurant to get his money. Carl, having again lost the money he had saved, convinces Ash to join the poker game under cover of being a former schoolteacher. The staff, believing Ash's story, accept his inclusion; the absence of Tony has left a seat available.

Frankie spends much of the first act convincing Sweeney to play in the game that night. Sweeney has permission to see his daughter the following morning and does not want to stay up all night getting drunk and losing his money. Frankie is thought the best poker player in the group, and believes he is going to become a professional in Las Vegas.

== Act 3 ==
The second half of the play is the poker game. As the game goes on, Ash wins every game. At first he puts this down to beginner's luck, but it soon becomes apparent to most of the players that Ash is far more than just a beginner and that it was highly likely he was lying when he claimed to be Carl's former schoolteacher. Each player in turn ends up losing all their money to Ash until finally only Carl, Ash, Mugsy and Stephen are left playing. Carl has some winnings and is able to repay Mugsy for a debt incurred earlier however Mugsy immediately prepares to blow this on another hand of poker. Only Stephen remains in the game and claims to have an inferior hand allowing Mugsy to win and leave the game seven pounds richer. As Mugsy has only a small amount of money left he is convinced by Stephen to walk away with what he has got. Carl threatens to expose Stephen's deception because he believes his own father has treated Mugsby better than himself. He does not carry out this threat and Mugsy leaves happy and none the wiser.

Carl, Ash and Stephen are left alone and Stephen sends Carl out of the room to fetch some coffee. Once he has left, a heated interrogation starts and Stephen finds out who Ash really is. As the tension rises, the two men argue over which of them is truly addicted to gambling – Stephen, who plays poker every Sunday with his son and employees or Ash who owes £10,000 to other gamblers. Stephen has stated that he will return the £4,000 he just won from Ash in the previous round, even though he now knows Ash's circumstances. The men argue again until at the very peak of the argument Ash asks Stephen to toss a coin to decide which of them should get the money. Stephen refuses. Ash asks again and Stephen again refuses. Ash asks again, and again, and again. Each time Stephen refuses until eventually he gives in. Stephen bets heads and Ash bets tails. Ash tosses the coin. He is about to reveal which side the coin has landed on. He looks up at Stephen and states: "Four thousand pounds on the toss of a coin?". Nothing more is said for a while. It slowly dawns on both Stephen (and the audience) that although Ash is a gambler with debts to pay, Stephen is the real gambling addict.

Still without having seen the result of the coin, Stephen offers the four thousand pounds to Ash. Ash goes over to the cash box and removes it. He asks Stephen if he would like to check that he has removed the correct amount. Stephen shakes his head and says, "No, I trust you".

== Production history ==
An American production ran from 16 April to 31 May 1998 at the Mark Taper Forum with Adam Scott as Carl.

=== 2007 production ===
From 28 September 2007 to 17 November 2007, Dealer's Choice was presented at the Menier Chocolate Factory in London. It transferred to the Trafalgar Studios in Whitehall from 6 December 2007. The director was Samuel West, and the cast was as follows:

- Samuel Barnett – Carl
- Ross Boatman – Sweeney
- Roger Lloyd-Pack – Ash
- Jay Simpson – Frankie
- Malcolm Sinclair – Stephen
- Stephen Wight – Mugsy

Stephen Wight won The Milton Shulman Award for Outstanding Newcomer at the 2007 Evening Standard Theatre Awards for his performances as Mugsy and in Patrick Marber's Don Juan in Soho. Dealer's Choice transferred to the Trafalgar Studios in London's West End, with previews from 6–10 December 2007. The opening performance took place on 11 December. The production was subsequently nominated for an Olivier Award for Best Revival.
