= Free Agents (American TV series) =

American television series (2011)

- Genre: Sitcom
- Based on: Free Agents by Chris Niel
- Developed by: John Enbom
- Starring: Hank Azaria; Kathryn Hahn; Mo Mandel; Natasha Leggero; Joe Lo Truglio; Anthony Head; Al Madrigal
- Theme music composer: Eli "Paperboy" Reed
- Composer: Kurt Farquhar
- Country of origin: United States
- Original language: English
- No. of seasons: 1
- No. of episodes: 8 (4 aired online)

Production
- Executive producers: Chris Niel; John Enbom; Karey Burke; Todd Holland; Kenton Allen; Nira Park
- Camera setup: Videotape; Single-camera
- Running time: 30 minutes
- Production companies: Very Small Realm; Dark Toy Entertainment; Big Talk Productions; Universal Media Studios (episode 1); Universal Television (episodes 2–8); Open 4 Business Productions

Original release
- Network: NBC
- Release: September 14 – October 5, 2011
- Network: Hulu
- Release: January 16, 2012

Related
- Free Agents (British original)

Free Agents is an American sitcom television series that premiered on NBC September 14, 2011, in the 10:30 pm Eastern/9:30 pm Central time slot, before assuming its regular time slot on September 21, 2011, where it aired at 8:30 pm Eastern/7:30 pm Central on Wednesday nights. It is based on the British comedy series of the same name that was created by Chris Niel, who also serves as co-creator and producer on this version with John Enbom, Karey Burke, Todd Holland, and Kenton Allen for Big Talk Productions, Dark Toy Entertainment and Universal Television. This show was the last series to be produced by Universal Media Studios during the revival of Universal Television.

On October 6, 2011, NBC cancelled the series after only four episodes were broadcast, due to low ratings. The remaining four episodes produced were later released via Hulu on January 16, 2012.

== Synopsis ==
The series followed the lives of two public relations executives at an advertising firm in Portland, Oregon: Alex Taylor (Hank Azaria), who is recently divorced, and Helen Ryan (Kathryn Hahn), a woman trying to move on after the death of her fiancé. They discover that they seem to have an attraction for each other, and have a drunken one-night stand, but try to stay professional at work, where their friends will do anything to get them to re-enter the dating scene.

== Cast and characters ==
- Hank Azaria as Alex Taylor
- Kathryn Hahn as Helen Ryan
- Mo Mandel as Dan Mackey
- Natasha Leggero as Emma Parker
- Al Madrigal as Gregg
- Joe Lo Truglio as Walter
- Anthony Head as Stephen Yates

== Development and production ==
NBC took interest in this project after executive producer Todd Holland began developing the American adaptation with the British's original writer Chris Niel and producers Nira Park, Kenton Allen, and Matthew Justice in September 2010. They also made changes to the workplace setting from talent agents in the British version to PR executives for American viewers, after NBC greenlit the pilot in February 2011.

Actor Anthony Head was the only cast member who had ties to both shows, in which he played Stephen, the boss in the British and American adaptations.

== Episodes ==
No.	Title	Directed by	Written by	Original release date	Prod. code	U.S. viewers (millions)
1	"Pilot"	Todd Holland	John Enbom	September 14, 2011	101	6.12
2	"What I Did for Work"	Peter Lauer	Ira Ungerleider	September 21, 2011	103	3.86
3	"Dr. Hu"	Todd Holland	Diane Ruggiero	September 28, 2011	102	3.07
4	"Rebranding"	Millicent Shelton	John Enbom	October 5, 2011	104	3.25
5	"Nice Guys Finish...At Some Point"	Michael Engler	Emily Cutler	January 16, 2012 (on Hulu)	105	TBA
6	"Are You There, Helen? It's Me, God"	Bryan Gordon	Alexa Junge	January 16, 2012 (on Hulu)	106	TBA
7	"The Kids Are Probably All Right"	Todd Holland	Jill Cargerman	January 16, 2012 (on Hulu)	107	TBA
8	"Sexin' the Raisin"	Kevin Dowling	Jon Silberman & Josh Silberman	January 16, 2012 (on Hulu)	108	TBA

== Ratings ==
No.	Title	Air date	18-49 rating	Viewers (millions)
1	"Pilot"	September 14, 2011	2.1	6.12
2	"What I Did for Work"	September 21, 2011	1.3	3.86
3	"Dr. Hu"	September 28, 2011	1.0	3.07
4	"Rebranding"	October 5, 2011	1.0	3.25

== International broadcasts ==
The series was simulcast in Canada by CTV2.

Broadcast by TV Séries in Portugal 4 weeks after the American air date.
