= The Paradise (TV series) =

British TV series

- Genre: Drama
- Created by: Bill Gallagher
- Based on: Au Bonheur des Dames by Emile Zola
- Written by: Bill Gallagher; Gaby Chiappe; Katie Baxendale; Ben Harris
- Directed by: David Drury; Marc Jobst; Susan Tully; Bill Gallagher; Kenneth Glenaan
- Starring: Joanna Vanderham; Peter Wight; Emun Elliott; Matthew McNulty; David Hayman; Sarah Lancashire; Sonya Cassidy; Stephen Wight; Finn Burridge; Elaine Cassidy; Patrick Malahide; Ruby Bentall; Katie Moore; Lisa Millett; Ben Daniels; Edie Whitehead
- Composer: Maurizio Malagnini
- Country of origin: United Kingdom
- Original language: English
- No. of series: 2
- No. of episodes: 16

Production
- Executive producers: Susan Hogg; Bill Gallagher; Rebecca Eaton (for Masterpiece)
- Producer: Simon Lewis
- Cinematography: Alan Almond; Simon Richards; Peter Greenhalgh
- Running time: 59 minutes
- Production companies: BBC Productions; Masterpiece

Original release
- Network: BBC One
- Release: 25 September 2012 – 8 December 2013

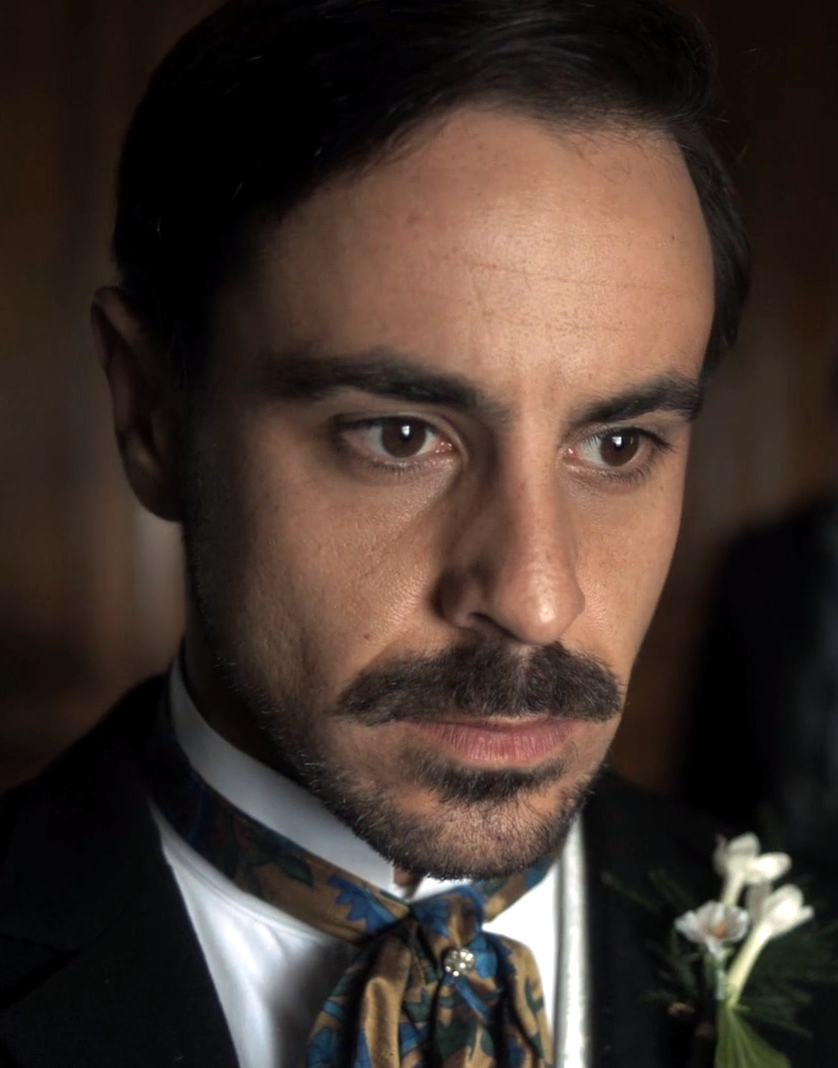
Emun Elliott as John Moray

The Paradise is a British television costume drama series co-produced by BBC Studios and Masterpiece. The Paradise premiered in the United Kingdom on BBC One on 25 September 2012 and premiered in the United States on PBS on 6 October 2013. The series is an adaptation of Émile Zola's 1883 novel Au Bonheur des Dames. It relocates the story to North East England. Zola's novel itself is a retelling of the story of Aristide Boucicaut, the Bellême-born founder of Le Bon Marché.

A second series was commissioned by BBC One in late October 2012 and was broadcast on 20 October 2013 on BBC One.

On 12 February 2014, the BBC confirmed that The Paradise would not return for a third series. It cited the fact that the programme had lower figures than other relatively new dramas such as Death in Paradise, Sherlock and Silk. Furthermore, its ITV rival Mr Selfridge was performing better.

== Plot ==
=== Series 1 ===
Series 1 begins in 1875, and portrays the lives and loves of the people who work, shop, and trade in and around the first English department store. The owner of The Paradise department store is widower John Moray. Moray was once a draper's boy in Emersons, the small shop that grew under his managership into The Paradise, which has come to dominate the high street to the detriment of small shopkeepers nearby.

Into this world comes Denise Lovett, from the small town of Peebles in Scotland, whose uncle, Edmund, is one of the shopkeepers struggling to survive. Denise takes a job at The Paradise and is soon seen by Moray as a rising star, to the annoyance of Miss Audrey, the head of ladies' fashion, and of Clara, a fellow shopgirl. Moray is financially dependent on Lord Glendenning. Katherine, Lord Glendenning's daughter, is determined to marry Moray and sees Denise as a direct threat to her ambitions.

=== Series 2 ===
Lord Glendenning has died and Katherine Glendenning has inherited The Paradise. She now has a husband, Tom Weston, and a young stepdaughter, Flora. Katherine asks Moray, who has been exiled to Paris, to return to revive the fortunes of The Paradise, and save it from being sold. Weston is determined to control his wife and The Paradise, overruling Moray to his own advantage. Moray's position at the Bon Marche is a reference to Octave Mouret's derision and constant competition with the same.

== Production ==
The series was filmed at Lambton Castle, which was converted into an 1870s bustling upmarket department store. Alongside, a Victorian street with shops and a tavern were constructed. Biddick Hall, also on the Lambton estate, was used as Lord Glendenning's house.

== Cast ==
=== Main cast ===
Character	Portrayed by	Based on	Series	
Character	Portrayed by	Based on	1	2
Denise Lovett	Joanna Vanderham	Denise Baudu	Main	Main
Edmund Lovett	Peter Wight	Baudu	Main	Main
John Moray	Emun Elliott	Octave Mouret	Main	Main
Dudley	Matthew McNulty	Bourdoncle	Main	Main
Jonas Franks	David Hayman	Jouve	Main	Main
Miss Audrey	Sarah Lancashire	Madame Aurélie Lhomme	Main	Recurring
Clara	Sonya Cassidy	Clara Prunaire	Main	Main
Sam	Stephen Wight	Hutin and Deloche	Main	Main
Arthur	Finn Burridge	/	Main	Main
The Hon. Katherine Glendenning	Elaine Cassidy	Madame Desforges	Main	Main
Lord Glendenning	Patrick Malahide	Baron Hartmann	Main	
Pauline	Ruby Bentall	Pauline Cugnot	Main	
Susy Bell	Katie Moore	/		Main
Myrtle	Lisa Millett	/		Main
Tom Weston	Ben Daniels	/		Main
Flora Weston	Edie Whitehead	/		Main

=== Recurring and guest cast ===
Guest stars who played a major part in an episode were credited in the opening credits, amongst the main cast, for that specific episode. The following actors' names were included in the opening credits in at least one episode:

- Olivia Hallinan as Jocelin Brookmire, a wealthy but unhappy friend of Katherine's
- Mark Bonnar as Peter Adler, a wealthy philanthropist and suitor to Katherine
- Arthur Darvill as Bradley Burroughs, a barber who is Moray's business partner for a short time
- David Bamber as Charles Chisholm, a milliner with a shop across the street from The Paradise
- Adrian Scarborough as Joseph Fenton, one of the Fenton brothers, wealthy businessmen intent on buying The Paradise
- Kevin Guthrie as Nathaniel, one of the boys working in the loading bays at The Paradise, who is secretly employed by Mr Fenton
- Branka Katic as Clémence Romanis, a free-thinking Parisian supplier and friend of Moray's
- Julia Ford as Ruby Bell, Susy's estranged mother
- John Duttine as Campbell Balentine, the wealthy owner of a successful beer brewery
- Liz White as Lucille Balentine, a former nurse who has recently married Campbell
- Nathan Stewart-Jarrett as Christian Cartwright, a renowned photographer

== Series overview ==
Series	Episodes	Originally released	
Series	Episodes	First released	Last released
1	8	25 September 2012	13 November 2012
2	8	20 October 2013	8 December 2013

== Episodes ==
=== Series 1 (2012) ===
No.	Title	Directed by	Written by	Original release date	UK viewers (millions)
1	"Episode 1"	Marc Jobst	Bill Gallagher	25 September 2012	6.61
Denise Lovett arrives in a northern English town to seek employment with her uncle in his draper's shop. His shop is failing under pressure from The Paradise, the first high-class department store in the town, and cannot afford to take her on. Undeterred, she seeks a position as a salesgirl at The Paradise and comes under the watchful eye of the head of ladies fashion, Miss Audrey, and her strict standards. She soon catches the eye of the widowed owner Moray, much to the chagrin of salesgirl Clara, who has slept with him, and Katherine Glendenning, daughter of Lord Glendenning, who expects to marry him.
2	"Episode 2"	David Drury	Bill Gallagher	2 October 2012	5.79
Katherine Glendenning brings her friend Mrs. Brookmire to the store to cheer her up. Dazzled by the array of goods and the attention given to her by Sam at the draper's counter, Mrs. Brookmire buys so many items that Moray opens the first store account for her to settle the bill at a later date. After becoming ill in the store, Mrs Brookmire is helped by Sam. She invites him to the Glendennings' home, where she breaks down to reveal she has left her husband. She kisses Sam just as Lord Glendenning and Katherine walk in. Sam is accused of ungentlemanly behaviour and Moray is asked to dismiss him. With the reputation of The Paradise is at stake, Moray is intent on discovering the truth.
3	"Episode 3"	David Drury	Gaby Chiappe	9 October 2012	5.70
Denise’s discovery of a baby in the Ladieswear department causes ripples throughout the store. Clara resents Denise's popularity, while Miss Audrey fears Denise's ambitions. Meanwhile, Arthur questions his own foundling status. Moray uses the baby to increase sales, while Katherine pursues Peter Adler, who runs a home for foundlings, in an attempt to make Moray jealous. Denise comes up with an idea for a children's department and uses Katherine as a go-between to tell Moray about her idea, which fails. Clara's secret is threatened when the foundlings take a field trip to the Paradise.
4	"Episode 4"	Sue Tully	Bill Gallagher	16 October 2012	5.14
Miss Audrey develops a mysterious illness, causing her to lose her voice. Her absence creates a vacancy for a temporary Head of Ladieswear, and Moray appoints Denise as head because a potential client is expected to make a large order. A jealous Clara tries to sabotage the order while Katherine enjoys the effect Peter Adler is having on her life, but her behaviour worries her father. Clara tries to seduce Moray once again. Katherine, unable to forget Moray, ends her friendship with Adler. Moray assures Miss Audrey that she is appreciated at The Paradise.
5	"Episode 5"	Marc Jobst	Bill Gallagher	23 October 2012	5.82
Bradley Burroughs' barber shop is in the way of The Paradise's expansion, and Moray is forced to make Burroughs a junior partner to continue expanding. However, Burroughs causes consternation throughout the store so Jonas takes matters into his own hands. Denise's idea for a "Gentlemen's Afternoon" is stolen by Miss Audrey and becomes a disaster when misunderstood by the gentlemen's wives. Miss Glendenning deliberately provokes Moray by shopping with his rival shopkeepers, giving Denise's uncle false hopes for the survival of his failing business.
6	"Episode 6"	Sue Tully	Bill Gallagher	30 October 2012	5.30
Exotic lovebirds arrive as a new attraction to be sold at the Paradise. Pauline is promoted to sell the birds, but accidentally releases one. Lord Glendenning offers Moray a bigger loan to buy the freehold of every shop in the street. Moray commits to an engagement with Katherine. Despite the warnings of Miss Audrey, Denise is unable to keep her true feelings from Moray any longer. On the announcement of the engagement, Denise leaves The Paradise to live with her uncle. Arthur fears that Jonas has done something to Burroughs, having seen them together.
7	"Episode 7"	Marc Jobst	Katie Baxendale	6 November 2012	5.69
Katherine's wedding plans and her future plans for Moray and The Paradise threaten Jonas, whose presence upsets her, as does the picture of Moray's former wife. Denise's plan for a co-operative of the small traders in the neighbouring street has some initial success, causing reduced sales at The Paradise, but ultimately fails when the traders fall out, prompted by hatmaker Charles Chisholm. Lord Glendenning suggests that Moray and Katherine take an extended honeymoon in Europe following the wedding.
8	"Episode 8"	David Drury	Bill Gallagher	13 November 2012	5.77
As the wedding approaches, Denise returns to The Paradise. Moray confesses his love for her, much to her delight. However, Lord Glendenning now owns the freeholds of The Paradise and all the surrounding shops, having changed his mind about loaning Moray the money to buy them, and insists that Moray's marriage to Katherine must take place. Katherine warns Denise that if she and Moray get together, Moray could lose The Paradise. Burroughs' body turns up in the river, and since Jonas is the main suspect, Dudley attempts to dismiss him. Just before his wedding, Moray searches The Paradise for Denise and the series ends with them kissing.

=== Series 2 (2013) ===
No.	Title	Directed by	Written by	Original release date	UK viewers (millions)
9	"Episode 1"	David Drury	Bill Gallagher	20 October 2013	6.04
It is one year later. Lord Glendenning has died. Katherine has a new husband, Tom Weston, and a ten year old step daughter, Flora. Denise is still at the department store while the disgraced Moray is working in Paris. The Paradise, now owned by Katherine and her husband, may be sold unless its sales improve. Katherine recalls Moray to save The Paradise, although her husband and the staff, especially Denise, doubt her motives.
10	"Episode 2"	David Drury	Bill Gallagher	27 October 2013	5.44
Miss Audrey's impending wedding to Edmund Lovett raises questions as to who will replace her. Moray's friend from Paris, the flirtatious Clemence, arrives in town as a fireworks supplier. Clemence causes controversy among the girls when she declares that women should be able to continue to work after marriage, causing Miss Audrey to doubt her wedding plans to Edmund. Tom Weston becomes fixated on Clemence, much to Katherine's jealousy. Denise is also jealous of Clemence, until she learns that Clemence is not interested in men. The banished Jonas arrives back in a cart, half-dead.
11	"Episode 3"	David Drury	Gaby Chiappe	3 November 2013	5.50
Filling the now vacant Head of Ladieswear position proves to be complicated: Tom Weston favours Clara, but Katherine worries that he intends to make Clara his mistress, so she supports Denise. Denise is delighted to be under consideration, but Moray tries to discourage her from applying, afraid of Denise becoming a pawn in Katherine and Tom's games. Tom intends to send Flora away to boarding school, so Dudley takes Flora under his wing to educate her at The Paradise. The annual Paradise staff outing to the music hall is cancelled by Weston, but Jonas encourages Denise to organise an alternate event.
12	"Episode 4"	Kenny Glenaan	Bill Gallagher	10 November 2013	5.50
Tom Weston's plans to expand The Paradise threaten to put Moray's hope of buying the store back beyond his financial reach. Moray reluctantly considers allying himself with Mr. Fenton, who suggests that Moray flirt with Katherine to make Tom jealous enough to sell the shop. A mysterious vagabond breaks into Edmund's shop and is revealed to be a figure from Susy's past. Distraught, Susy loses her temper at Flora and is dismissed. However, Denise tries to think of a way to get Susy's job back.
13	"Episode 5"	David Drury	Bill Gallagher	17 November 2013	5.03
Weston is upset when Moray opens a department selling timepieces, taking the limelight from his new food hall. Moray schemes with Jonas and Fenton to further upset Weston by using Katherine's father's pocket watch as a centrepiece attraction, giving the impression that Katherine is still in love with Moray. Denise's democratic method of running the Ladieswear department attracts Weston's attention and he offers her the chance to show the other departments her ways, which upsets Moray. Meanwhile, Sam becomes obsessed with the watch and accidentally hypnotises Susy into falling in love with him.
14	"Episode 6"	Bill Gallagher	Bill Gallagher	24 November 2013	5.52
Katherine is terrified by her husband's cruel mind games and she confides in Moray about Tom's increasingly spiteful behaviour, unaware that Tom is spying on her. Wealthy newlyweds Lucille and elderly Campbell Ballentine become Paradise customers, and Lucille asks the Ladieswear department to teach her how to be a lady. Denise sees Ballentine as a potential backer for Moray and takes the initiative to convince him to invest in The Paradise. Moray's scheming with Fenton and Jonas causes emotions to run high and his flirtation with Katherine to go too far.
15	"Episode 7"	David Drury	Ben Harris	1 December 2013	5.08
Weston hires photographer Christian Cartwright to take portraits of his family and The Paradise staff. Cartwright becomes interested in making Clara his muse, while Katherine tries to repair her fragile marriage to Tom. Moray and Denise's relationship is still strained even when he reveals he was only flirting with Katherine as part of his plan to regain control of The Paradise. Denise creates 'Paradise Postcards' with Cartwright for their customers, much to the annoyance of Moray. Weston reveals Moray's plotting to Katherine, and suggests she has a holiday abroad alone. The Paradise is chosen to bring a serialised ghost story to life, which brings Moray and Denise back together. Weston makes a proposal to Clara.
16	"Episode 8"	David Drury	Gaby Chiappe	8 December 2013	5.07
A smartly dressed French debt collector dies in the store shortly after the arrival of Clemence, who is supplying Hazard dice and Parisian rouge, a product associated with prostitutes. Denise is challenged to sell the product to ladies, who find rouge too scandalous. Weston confronts Clemence and reveals that he knows the debt collector was looking for her. He has bought her debts and tries to blackmail her, as Katherine discovers she is pregnant and tries to fix her marriage with Tom. Denise, Jonas and Moray attempt to stop Weston. Denise and Moray reconcile, but he is reluctant to marry her since she would be forced to quit The Paradise. Denise decides to start her own business from her uncle's shop so that the two can be free to be together. The series ends with them kissing.

== Soundtrack ==
A soundtrack, featuring music by composer Maurizio Malagnini from the series, was released by Silva Screen Records on 26 August 2013. The music was performed by the BBC Concert Orchestra and recorded at Air Studios, Lyndhurst Hall, London, UK. The score won a Music + Sound Award 2013.

=== Track listing ===
The Paradise - Original Television Soundtrack
No.	Title	Length
1.	"The Paradise Lovebirds"
2.	"The Portrait"
3.	"Children Arrive At The Paradise"
4.	"Impossible Love"
5.	"I Will Ruin You"
6.	"Reception Waltzer"
7.	"Opening The Doors"
8.	"We Will Never Know"
9.	"Denise Is Entering The Paradise"
10.	"Shopgirls"
11.	"Trailer And End Credits"
12.	"I Have Married The Wrong Man"
13.	"Sam Is Innocent"
14.	"Miss Paradise Pink"
15.	"Pauline's Theme"
16.	"Miss Audrey And Ladieswear"
17.	"Perfume From Morocco"
18.	"Sam Could Lose Everything"
19.	"Audrey And The Baby"
20.	"Denise And Moray"
21.	"Lord Glendenning Owns Everything"
22.	"Miss Audrey Is Unwell"
23.	"The Dark Lake And Jonas"
24.	"Katherine And Moray"
25.	"The Wedding Veil"
26.	"You Are Mine"
27.	"The Hope For Love"
28.	"Denise And Moray Are Falling In Love"
29.	"The Final Kiss"

== Releases ==
=== DVD ===
Series 1 was released by BBC Worldwide in a region 2 three-disc set on 3 December 2012.

Series 2 was released by 2Entertain in a region 2 three-disc set on 9 December 2013.

Series 1 and 2 were released by 2Entertain as a six-disc box set on 9 December 2013.

=== Blu-ray ===
Series 1 was released by BBC Home Entertainment in a Zone A two-disc set on 12 November 2013.
