= Strawberry Fields (2011 film) =

- Film poster
- Directed by: Frances Lea
- Written by: Judith Johnson; Frances Lea
- Produced by: Liam Beatty; Lucie Wenigerova
- Starring: Anna Madeley; Emun Elliott; Christine Bottomley
- Cinematography: Dave Miller
- Edited by: Cinzia Baldessari
- Music by: Bryony Afferson; James Stone
- Distributed by: BBC Films
- Release dates: November 2011 (London Film Festival); July 6, 2012
- Running time: 94 minutes
- Country: England
- Language: English

Strawberry Fields is a 2011 psychological drama film directed by Frances Lea and starring Anna Madeley, Emun Elliott, and Christine Bottomley. It is set in the Kent countryside of England during the summer fruit picking season. It was filmed entirely on location in Kent county, and the background reflects the extensive fruit growing economy of Kent (sometimes called the Garden of England).

== Plot ==
Two sisters, Gillian and Emily, have a long history of a strained and troubled relationship, and are recently bereaved by the death of their mother. Both sisters have psychological problems. The cast are all itinerant fruit pickers on the fictional Rymans Farm. Kev, an older Scottish picker (played by Emun Elliott) who has grandiose but unfulfilled plans for his future, and Fabio (played by Jonathan Bonnici), a headstrong and sexually demanding young Italian picker, provide the material for the underlying sexual tension of the film. Gillian's attempts to escape from Emily, frustrated by her own conflicting desire to care for her mentally ill sister.

== Production ==
The film was produced by Spring Pictures, working in association with Film London, BBC Films, Screen South, Screen East, MetFilm, and the Kent County Council Film Office. Additional funding was provided by the National Lottery through the UK Film Council, and the office of the Mayor of London.

The production filmed at Foxbury Farm in Sevenoaks and Shellness, Leysdown in Kent.
