= King Of... =

British television comedy talk show

- Genre: Comedy panel show
- Presented by: Claudia Winkleman
- Opening theme: "The Photos on My Wall" by Good Shoes
- Country of origin: United Kingdom
- Original language: English
- No. of series: 1
- No. of episodes: 4

Production
- Running time: 30 minutes (inc. adverts)
- Production companies: Big Talk Productions and Saltbeef TV

Original release
- Network: Channel 4
- Release: 17 June – 8 July 2011

King Of... is a British comedy panel show that aired on Channel 4 from 17 June to 8 July 2011. The show was hosted by Claudia Winkleman. It featured two celebrity guests per episode and a studio audience. The guests discussed what is the 'king of' various categories.

== Episodes ==
No.	Title	King of...	Original release date
1	Sarah Millican and Chris Evans	Holidays, jobs, cheese	17 June 2011
2	Jessie Wallace and Stephen Mangan	TBA	24 June 2011
3	Lorraine Kelly and Jack Whitehall	Uniforms, condiments, chefs, parties	1 July 2011
4	Miranda Hart and Micky Flanagan	TBA	8 July 2011
