= Emun Elliott =

Scottish actor (born 1983)

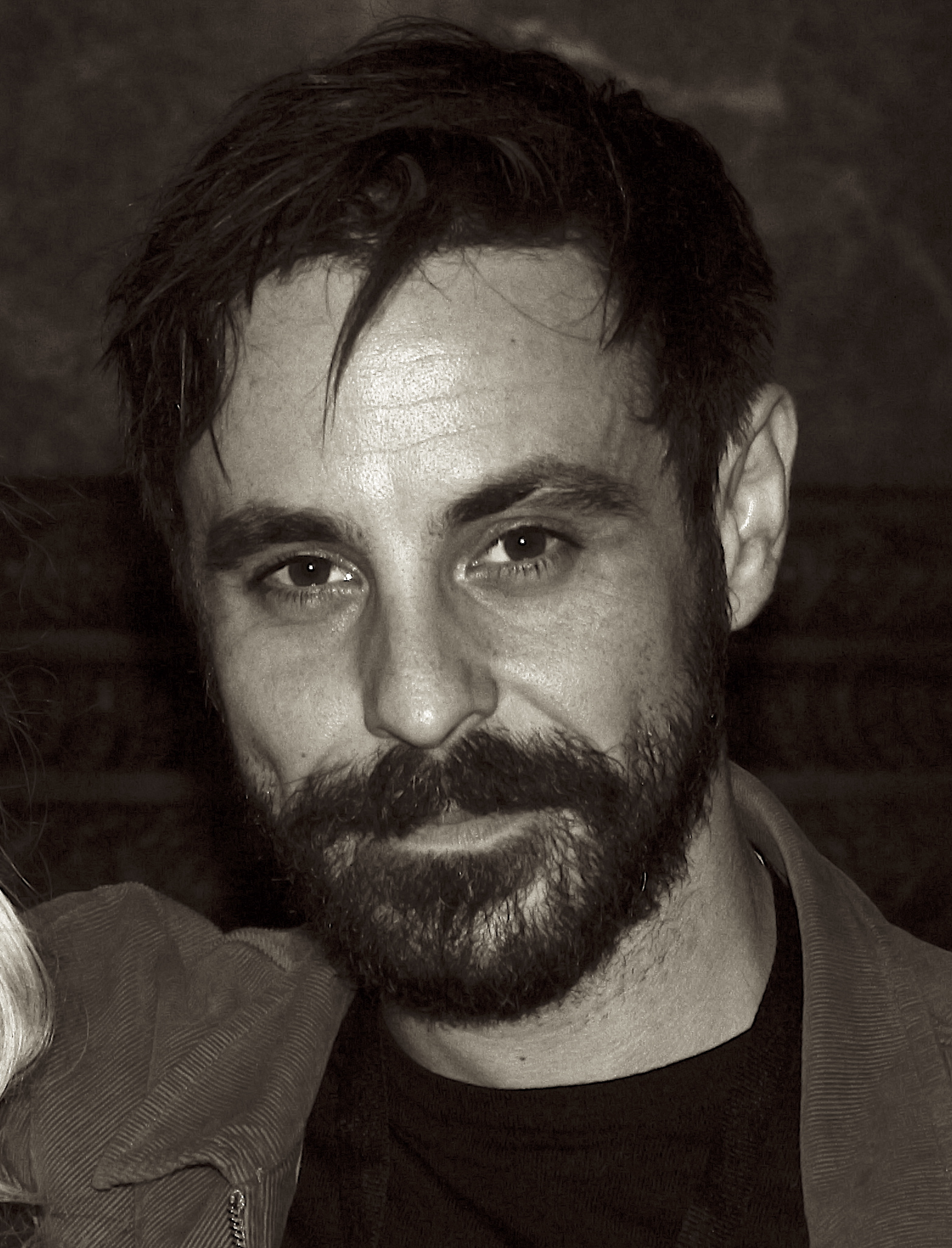
- Elliot in 2017
- Born: Emun John Mohammadi; 28 November 1983 (age 42); Edinburgh, Scotland
- Education: Royal Scottish Academy of Music and Drama
- Occupation: Actor
- Years active: 2005–present

Emun Elliott (born 28 November 1983) is a Scottish actor, known for portraying Dr. Christian King in Paradox, Richie in Threesome, John Moray in The Paradise, Kenny in Guilt, and Tony Brightwell in The Gold.

== Background ==
Elliott was born in 1983 in Edinburgh as Emun John Mohammadi. His father is of Persian descent; his mother is Scottish. He was raised in Duddingston, Portobello, Edinburgh, and attended George Heriot's School before beginning a degree in English literature and French at the University of Aberdeen. Dropping out of university after a year, he went on to train at the Royal Scottish Academy of Music and Drama.

== Career ==
Elliott's television credits include Monarch of the Glen, Feel the Force, Afterlife and Paradox, in which he played the lead role of Dr Christian King. He also played Jay Adams in the BBC Three drama Lip Service, and appeared in an episode of Inspector George Gently, and in the crime drama Vera.

Elliott made his film debut in The Clan (2009). He appeared in Black Death (2010) and Strawberry Fields (2011). He has lent his voice to the radio dramas Places in Between and Black Watch.

On stage, Elliott has appeared in Black Watch as Private Fraser, a role he played for two and a half years with the National Theatre of Scotland. In 2010 he played Claudio in a production of Measure for Measure at the Almeida Theatre.

In 2009, Elliott was named as "one to watch" by Screen International.

Elliott starred as Richie, a gay man who gets his friend pregnant, in the Comedy Central sitcom Threesome. He appeared as charismatic 19th-century department store owner John Moray in the BBC One series The Paradise and played Andrew Brenner in the BBC One drama Trust Me. In 2019, he played Kenny Burns in the BBC Scotland drama Guilt.

== Filmography ==
=== Television ===
Year	Title	Role	Notes
2005	Monarch of the Glen	Danny	Episode 7.5
2006	Feel the Force	PC MacGregor	
2006	Afterlife	Tariq	Roadside Bouquets
2009	Paradox	Dr Christian King	
2010	Lip Service	Jay	
2010	Inspector George Gently	Damien Barratt	Peace And Love
2011	Vera	James Bennett	Telling Tales (S1, Ep2)
2011	Game of Thrones	Marillion	
2011–2012	Threesome	Richie	
2012	Labyrinth	Guilhem Du Mas	
2012	The Paradise	John Moray	
2012	Falcón	Basilio Sánchez	
2013	Rubenesque	Grant	
2016	Jonathan Creek	Stephen Belkin	Christmas special: "Daemon's Roost"
2017	Clique	Alistair McDermid	Series 1
2017	Trust Me	Andy Brenner	Series 1
2019–2023	Guilt	Kenny Burns	Series 1-3
2022	The Rig	Leck Longman	
2023-2025	The Gold	Tony Brightwell	
2024	Sexy Beast	Don Logan	Main cast
2025	The Guest	Richard Abbott	

=== Film ===
Year	Film	Role	Notes
2007	Then a Summer Starts	Luke	
2009	The Clan	Cal McKinley	
2010	Black Death	Swire	
2012	Prometheus	Chance	
2012	Strawberry Fields	Kev	
2013	Filth	Peter Inglis	
2013	The Ring Cycle	Richard	Short film
2014	Exodus: Gods and Kings		
2015	Scottish Mussel	Leon	
2015	Star Wars: The Force Awakens	Brance	
2017	6 Days	Roy	
2018	Tell It to the Bees	Robert Weekes	
2021	Old	Adult Trent Cappa	
2021	The King's Man	Black Watch Sergeant Major	
2026	The Incomer	Calum	

== Theatre ==
Year	Play	Role	Theatre	Notes
2015	Arthur Miller's A View from the Bridge	Marco	Young Vic, London	
2016	Lolita Chakrabarti's Red Velvet	Pierre LaPorte	Garrick Theatre, London	
2017	Fatherland		Royal Exchange, Manchester	
2019	The Rose Tattoo	Alvaro Mangiacavallo	American Airlines Theater, New York City	
